= Maki discography =

Discography of Filipino singer Maki

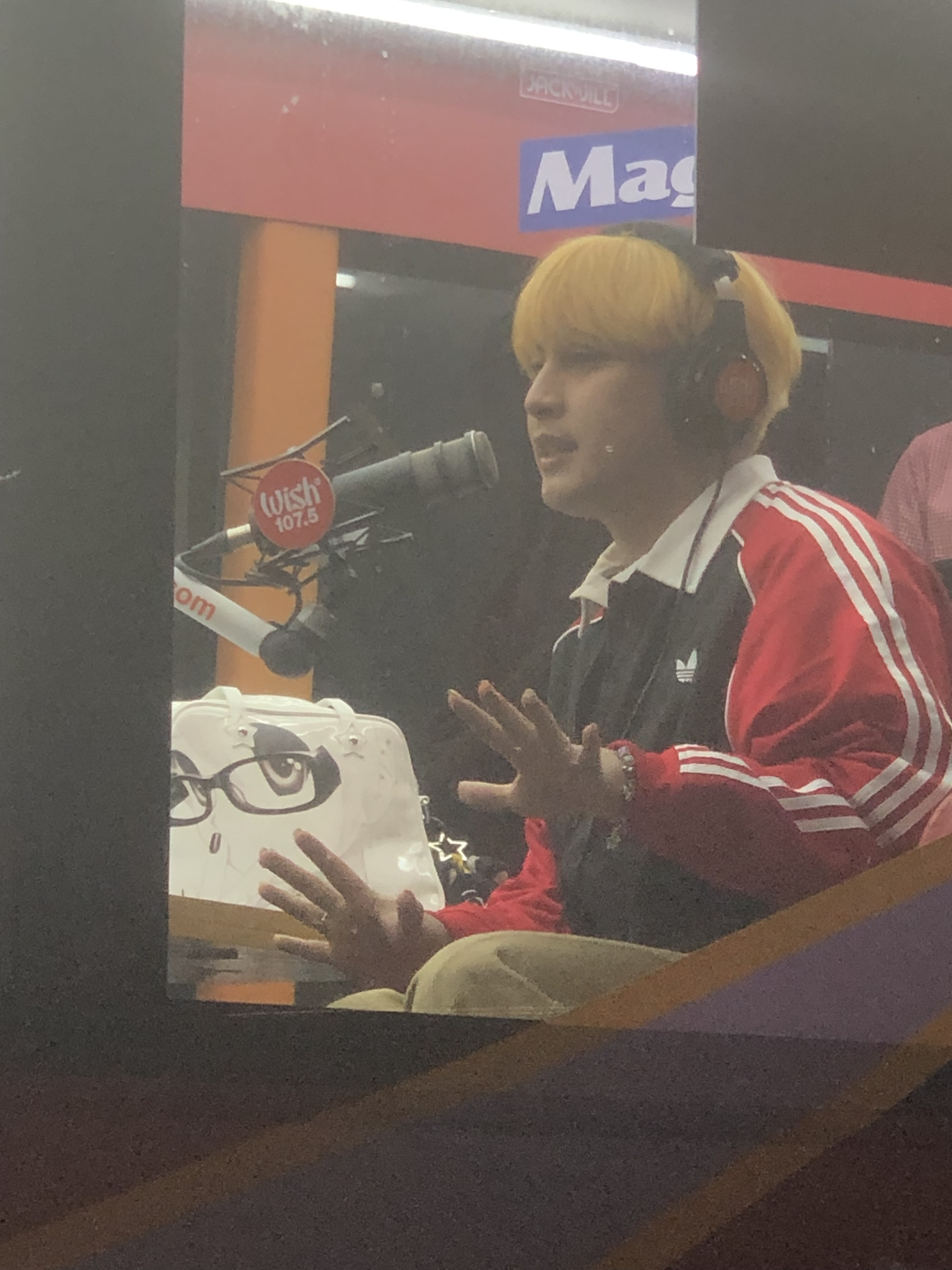
- Maki in 2026
- Studio albums: 1
- EPs: 1
- Singles: 15
- Music videos: 15
- Collaborative singles: 8

The discography of Filipino singer-songwriter Maki consists of one studio album, one extended play, and multiple singles. He first gained attention with the viral tracks "Saan?" and "Bakit?" from his debut EP Tanong (2023), before reaching wider mainstream success with "Dilaw" in 2024. His debut studio album, Kolorcoaster, was released in 2025.

== Studio albums ==
Kolorcoaster
- Released: September 19, 2025 (PHL)
- Label: Tarsier Records
- Formats: Digital download, streaming, CD

No.	Title	Length
1.	"Namumula"	2:45
2.	"Kahel na Langit"	3:36
3.	"Dilaw"	3:12
4.	"Turning Green"	1:38
5.	"Bughaw"	3:53
6.	"Indigo (with u)"	2:46
7.	"Nangungulila"	3:33
8.	"Itim na Ulap"	4:16
9.	"Abelyana"	3:17
10.	"ROYGBIV"	2:26
Total length:		31:35

== Extended plays ==
List of extended plays
Title	Album details	Ref.
Tanong	Released: September 22, 2023; Label: Tarsier Records; Formats: Digital download, streaming; Track listing: 1. "(Sigurado?)"; 2. "Saan?"; 3. "Bakit?"; 4. "Kailan?"; 5. "Siguro...?"	

== Singles ==
=== As lead artist ===
List of singles as lead artist, with year released, selected chart positions, certifications, and album name shown
Title	Year	Peak chart positions		Album	Ref.
Title	Year	PHL	Top PHL Songs	Album	Ref.
"Halaga"	2021	—	—	Non-album singles	
"Para Sa Buwan"	2022	—	—	Non-album singles	
"Saan?"	2023	16	11	Tanong	
"Bakit?"	2023	—	—	Tanong	
"Kailan?"	2023	—	—	Tanong	
"Siguro?"	2023	—	—	Tanong	
"Sigurado?"	2023	—	—	Tanong	
"Saan? (Live at the Cozy Cove)"	2023	—	—	Non-album single	
"HBD"	2024	—	—	Non-album single	
"Dilaw"	2024	1	1	Kolorcoaster	
"Kurba"	2024	—	—	Non-album single	
"Namumula"	2024	15	6	Kolorcoaster	
"Bughaw"	2024	—	—	Kolorcoaster	
"Kahel na Langit"	2025	12	4	Kolorcoaster	
"Habangbuhay Pansamantala"	2026	—	—	Non-album singles	

=== Collaborative singles ===
List of collaborative singles
Title	Year	Other acts	Album	Ref.
"Thinkin' Bout Your Smile"	2022	KaixAaron	Non-album singles	
"Better"	2022	Gessie	Non-album singles	
"Gusto Ko Nang Bumitaw (R&B Version)"	2022	Moophs	Non-album singles	
"Balse ng Gabi"	2023	Cesca	Non-album singles	
"Sikulo"	2024	Angela Ken and Nhiko	Non-album singles	
"Ako Ang Simula"	2025	Various artists	Non-album singles	
"Seasons"	2025	JVKE	The Asia Tour: Blooming Season EP	
"Turning Green"	2025	Joan	Kolorcoaster	
"Luck"	2026	James Reid	Non-album singles	

=== Soundtrack appearances ===
List of soundtrack appearances
Year	Film/series/program	Song(s)	Ref.
2025	My Love Will Make You Disappear	"Dilaw"	
2025	It's Okay to Not Be Okay	"Sa Aking Tabi"	
2025	Love You So Bad	"Sikulo" (with Angela Ken and Nhiko)	

=== Songwriting credits ===
Title	Year	Artist	Album	Composer	Lyricist	Ref.
"Alon"	2025	JL Gaspar	Non-album single	Yes	Yes	

== Music videos ==
Title	Year	Director(s)	Ref.
"Saan?" (with Karina Bautista)	2023	Kashka Gaddi	
"Bakit?" (with Karina Bautista)	2023	Kashka Gaddi	
"Kailan?" (with Karina Bautista)	2023	Kashka Gaddi	
"Siguro...?"	2023		
"Kailan?"	2023		
"HBD"	2024	Ingrid Ignacio	
"Balse ng Gabi" (with Cesca)	2024	Daniel Roxas	
"Sikulo" (with Angela Ken and Nhiko)	2024	Ingrid Ignacio	
"Dilaw" (with Maloi of Bini)	2024	Jaydee Alberto Maki	
"Namumula" (with Jannah Chua)	2024	Kerbs Balagtas	
"Kurba" (with Kei Kurosawa)	2024	Raf Evangelista	
"Bughaw" (with Kyler Chua, Alexei Abella and Zeke Abella)	2025	Raliug and Maki	
"Ako Ang Simula" (with various artists)	2025	Richmond Cadsawan	
"Kahel na Langit" (with Zushibois)	2025	Ingrid Ignacio and Maki	
"Habangbuhay Pansamantala" (with Justin of SB19)	2026	Ingrid Ignacio-Termulo	
"Luck" (with James Reid)	2026	Ingrid Ignacio-Termulo	
