= Idol Kids Philippines =

- Official poster
- Genre: Reality competition
- Created by: Simon Fuller
- Based on: Pop Idol
- Written by: Aol Rivera
- Directed by: Joane Laygo
- Presented by: Robi Domingo; Jolina Magdangal
- Judges: Regine Velasquez; Gary Valenciano; Angeline Quinto; Juan Karlos
- Theme music composer: Julian Gingell; Barry Stone; Cathy Dennis
- Country of origin: Philippines
- Original language: Filipino
- No. of seasons: 1
- No. of episodes: 28

Production
- Executive producers: Carlo L. Katigbak; Cory V. Vidanes; Laurenti M. Dyogi; Lui L. Andrada
- Producer: Olivia M. Zarate
- Camera setup: Multiple-camera setup
- Running time: 45–60 minutes
- Production companies: ABS-CBN Studios; Fremantle Asia; 19 Entertainment

Original release
- Network: Kapamilya Channel (Note: The show also aired on its primary network Kapamilya Channel as well as other affiliate blocktime channels and online platforms via Kapamilya Online Live on Facebook and YouTube. It is also available on-demand via iWant and internationally via The Filipino Channel.)
- Release: June 28 – September 28, 2025

Idol Kids Philippines is a Philippine television interactive reality competition show broadcast by Kapamilya Channel. Created and developed by FremantleMedia and 19 Entertainment, the program is a franchise of Pop Idol created by British entertainment executive Simon Fuller, the show is the spin-off of Idol Philippines. Hosted by Robi Domingo and Jolina Magdangal and Judges by Regine Velasquez, Gary Valenciano, Angeline Quinto and Juan Karlos, it aired from June 28 to September 28, 2025, replacing the seventh season of Pilipinas Got Talent and was replaced by the fourth season of Your Face Sounds Familiar.

== Overview ==
=== Development ===
On March 13, 2025, it was announced that ABS-CBN will broadcast the spin-off of Idol franchise in the Philippines 3 years after the second season of the main franchise.

=== Broadcast ===
The show airs on Kapamilya Channel and A2Z at 7:15pm with a delayed telecast on TV5 at 8:00 pm on Saturdays and 8:30pm on Sundays. It also airs on Kapamilya Online Live and streams on the show's official channels and pages on Facebook and YouTube.

=== Prizes ===
The grand winner received a combined cash prize of ₱1,350,000; ₱1,000,000 from the show and an additional ₱350,000 from the shows' sponsor CDO Idol Cheesedog and Hotdog. They also received a recording contract from StarPop.

== Judges and host ==
Judges and host of Idol Kids Philippines

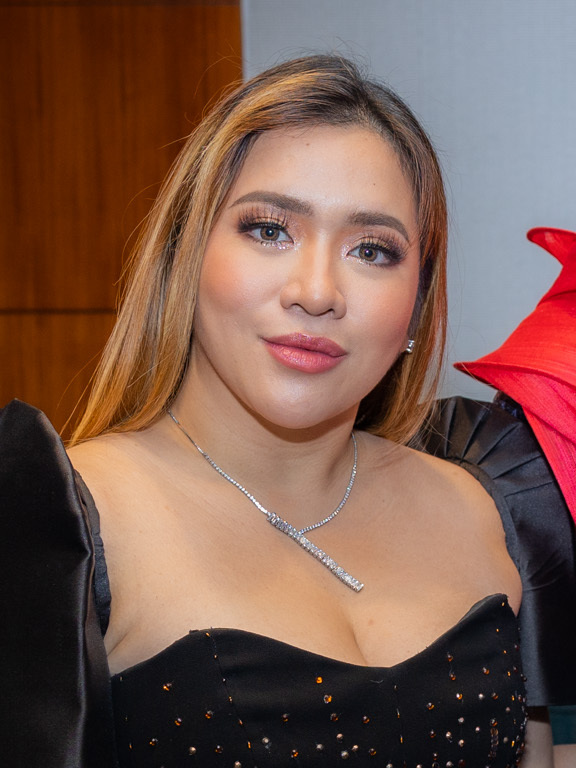
Angeline Quinto

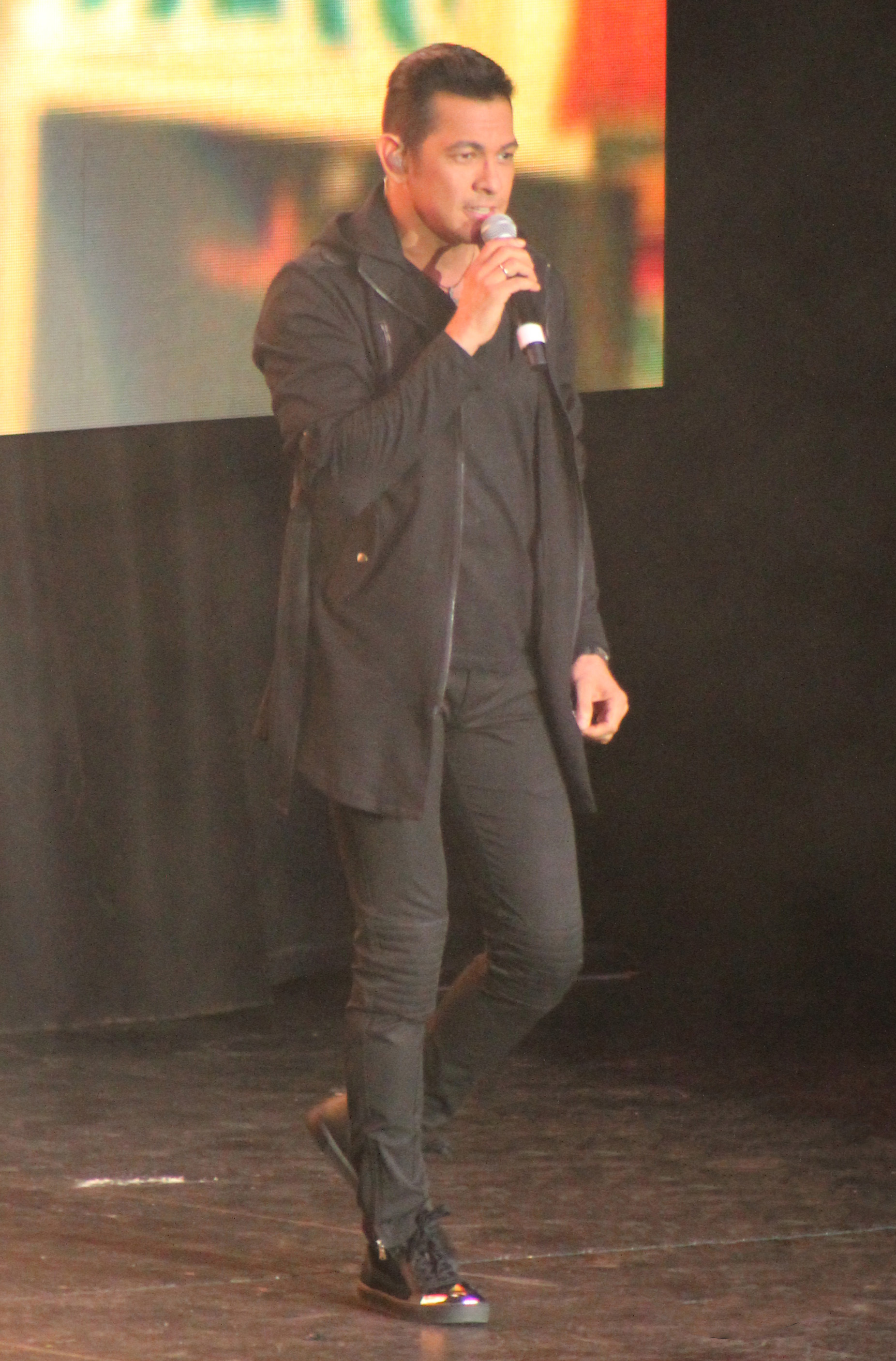
Gary Valenciano

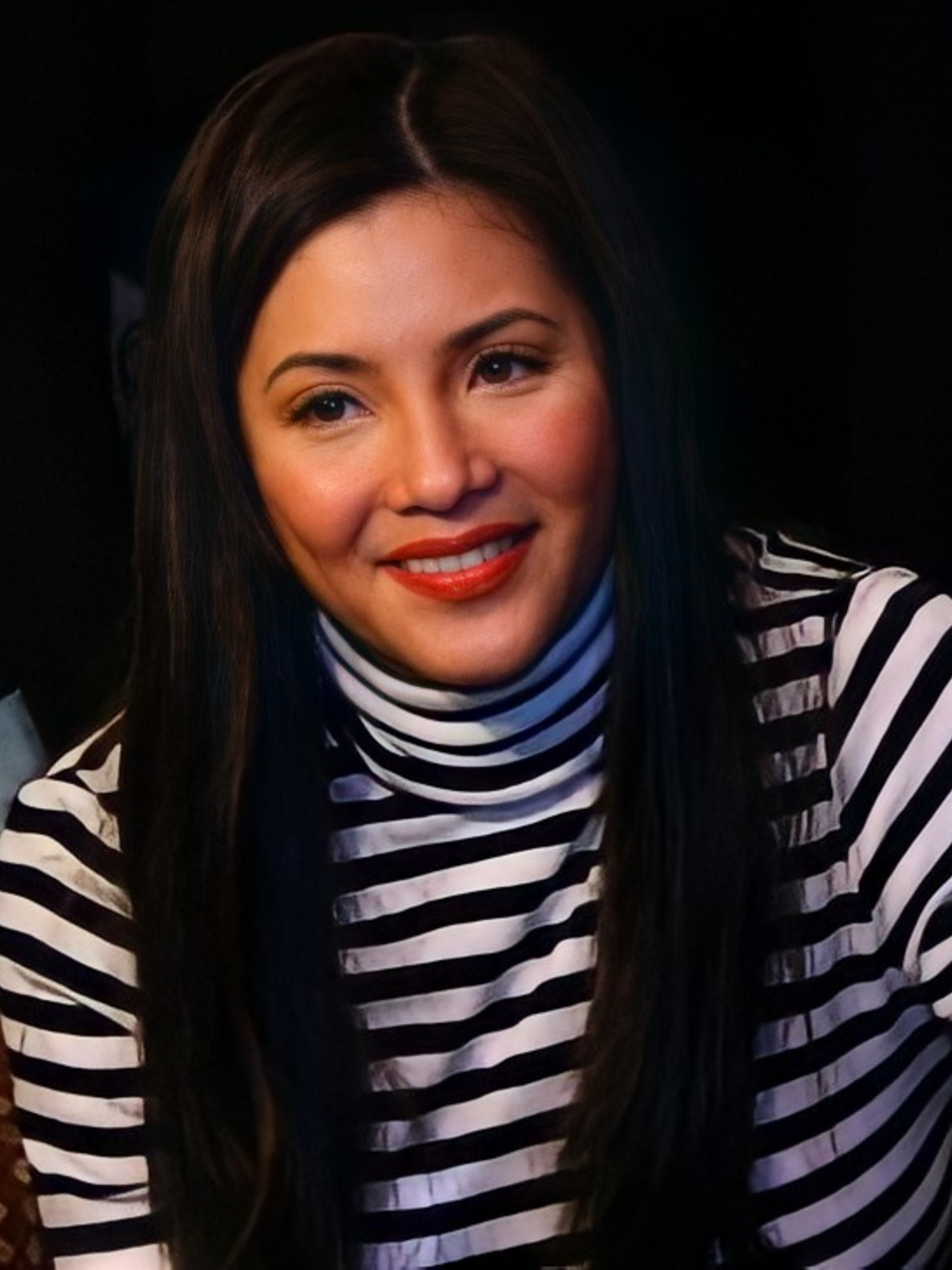
Regine Velasquez

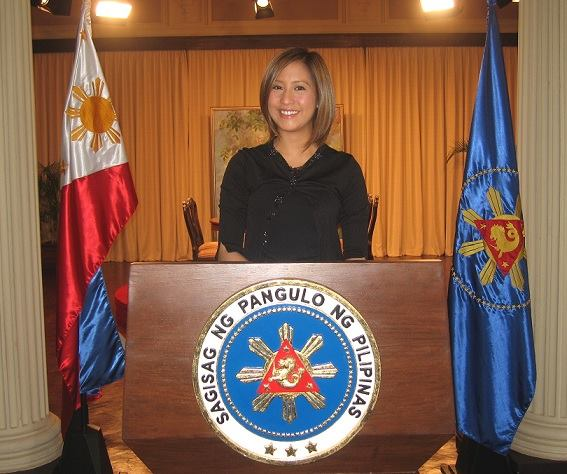
Jolina Magdangal

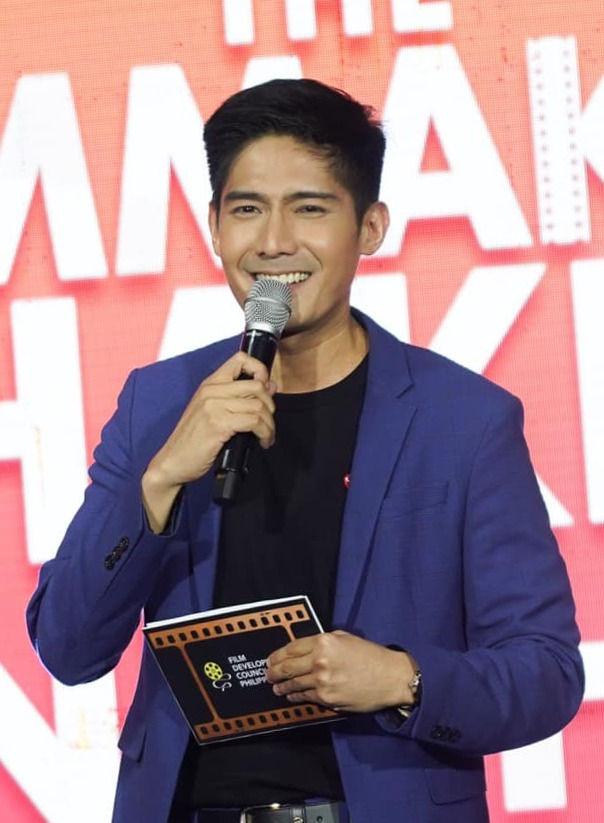
Robi Domingo

Robi Domingo, who hosted the season season of the main show, reprised his role for the spin-off series, and was joined by former Pinoy Idol judge Jolina Magdangal. Both had previously worked in the finale of the fifth season of The Voice Kids.

Regine Velasquez and Gary Valenciano, who judged the second season of the main season, reprised their roles as judges of the kids version, and they were joined by Angeline Quinto and Juan Karlos. With Velasquez returning from the franchise, she becomes the only judge to have served for both main seasons and the kids season.

=== Companion online show ===
An online show named Idol Kids Philippines Spotlight aired together with the main program on Idol Philippines' Facebook and YouTube accounts; it is hosted by former contestant Shanaia Gomez and Emilio Daez during the auditions and midrounds. Jeremy Glinoga replaced Daez during the live shows.

== Competition summary ==
Color key

Winner
Runner-up
Third place
Eliminated in the Live Finale
Eliminated in the Semifinals
Eliminated in the Midrounds

Top 67 contestants
Alexa Mendoza	Klied Cuangco	Quinn Holmes	MJ Alcano	Sean Lorenz Bernardez
Yassi Abaya Estrera	Abatar Dakdak	Andrea Flores	Francheska Paula Cape	Gab Balasabas
Jirah Giganto	Kara Gabrielle Lopez	Kean Vicente	Keisha Auron	Khasy Moreno
Leisah Baconga	Miggy Agulay	Samantha Braga	Aleina Magbuhat	Alex Patricio
Alexis Dela Cruz	Arwen Delfin	Ayen Manzano	Bella Alodia	Belle Almasin
Billy Xander Lontayao	Cataleya Cruz	Chloe Simborio	Dani Espina	Dexter Salvacion
Divine Damos	Ethan Gaspe	Fatima Sala	Franchesca Aleia Payunan	Gianna Salva
Jay-R Cayago	Jenard Cuestas	Jewel Arintoc	Jinwen Sumanda	John Paul Miguel Ramusu Nabong
Johnny Morris	Julia Rinoah Francisco	Kai Capiral	Katherine Rillones	Kiel Colonel
Kiko Valenzuela	Marchelle Mercado	Marcio Cano	Marvian Malabanan	Matteo Liam delos Ama
Meerah Respicio	Monique Naga	Natalie Javier	Prince Luna	Rain Sally Enero
Rain Vinegas	Rifa Amatonding	Safhia Legaspi	Samantha Romano	Sayen Silva
Sofia Andrea Pacencia	Sofie Marco	Theon Noyales	Uzzia Benedicto	Yanyan Atienza
Zian Visitacion	Zoe Aguilar			

== Auditions ==
The initial auditions for the season opened on March 27, 2025, for Idol hopefuls aged 6 to 13 years old. To advance and receive a golden ticket to the next round, an auditionee needed to receive at least three "yes" votes from the judges. The first audition episode was aired on June 28, 2025, with the final audition episode being aired on August 17, 2025. 67 Hopefuls advanced to the next round.

Ogie Alcasid, one of the judges of Pinoy Idol alongside Jolina Magdangal, made a cameo appearance during the auditions.

Summary of the auditions for Idol Kids Philippines
Episode(s)	Air Date	Golden tickets	Ref
1	June 28, 2025	4	
2	June 29, 2025	4	
3	July 5, 2025	4	
4	July 6, 2025	4	
5	July 12, 2025	3	
6	July 13, 2025	3	
7	July 19, 2025	5	
8	July 20, 2025	5	
9	July 26, 2025	4	
10	July 27, 2025	3	
11	August 2, 2025	3	
12	August 3, 2025	5	
13	August 9, 2025	4	
14	August 10, 2025	4	
15	August 16, 2025	4	
16	August 17, 2025	8	
Total no. of contestants		67	

Audition details of Idol Kids Philippines
Episode(s)	Order	Name	Age	Hometown	Song	Judges' Votes				Results
Episode(s)	Order	Name	Age	Hometown	Song	Quinto	Valenciano	Velasquez	Labajo	Results
Episode 1 (June 28, 2025)	1	Matteo Liam delos Ama	7	Sta. Cruz, Laguna	"Buwan" – Juan Karlos	✔	✔	✔	✔	Advanced
Episode 1 (June 28, 2025)	2	Ascher Belen	10	Makati City	"Chinito" – – Constantino	✔	✘	✔	✘	Eliminated
Episode 1 (June 28, 2025)	3	Cian Kate "Yanyan" Atienza	12	Bacoor, Cavite	"'Till My Heartaches End" – Ella Mae Saison	✘	✔	✔	✔	Advanced
Episode 1 (June 28, 2025)	4	John Gabriel Balasabas	7	Parañaque City	"Kumusta Ka Aking Mahal" – Freddie Aguilar	✔	✔	✔	✔	Advanced
Episode 1 (June 28, 2025)	5	Klied Cuangco	12	Las Piñas City	"Ako Naman Muna" – Angela Ken	✔	✔	✔	✔	Advanced
Episode 2 (June 29, 2025)	1	Natalie Javier	6	Dasmariñas, Cavite	"Babalik Sa'yo" – Moira dela Torre	✔	✔	✔	✔	Advanced
Episode 2 (June 29, 2025)	2	Prince Luna	12	San Nicolas, Pangasinan	"Ikaw Lang" – Nobita	✔	✘	✔	✔	Advanced
Episode 2 (June 29, 2025)	3	Nashrifa "Rifa" Amatonding	8	Dasmariñas, Cavite	"Salamat Salamat Musika" – Nanette Inventor	✔	✔	✔	✔	Advanced
Episode 2 (June 29, 2025)	4	Kiefer Viray	7	Binmaley, Pangasinan	"May Bukas Pa" – Rico J. Puno	✔	✔	✘	✘	Eliminated
Episode 2 (June 29, 2025)	5	Alexa Mendoza	9	Calamba City, Laguna	"Nosi Ba Lasi" – Sampaguita	✔	✔	✔	✔	Advanced
Episode 3 (July 5, 2025)	1	Marvian Aera Malabanan	11	Bulacan	"Sa Susunod na Habang Buhay" – Ben&Ben	✘	✔	✔	✔	Advanced
Episode 3 (July 5, 2025)	2	John Paul Miguel Ramusu Nabong	11	Claveria, Misamis Oriental	"Problemang Puso" – Jude Michael	✔	✘	✔	✔	Advanced
Episode 3 (July 5, 2025)	3	Deion Luis Ang	11	Tondo, Manila	"Iingatan Ka" – Carol Banawa	✘	✔	✘	✔	Eliminated
Episode 3 (July 5, 2025)	4	Kara Gabrielle Lopez	9	Quezon City	"Torete" – Moonstar88	✔	✔	✔	✔	Advanced
Episode 3 (July 5, 2025)	5	Yassi Abaya Estrera	11	Lupon, Davao Oriental	"Himig ng Pag-ibig" – Asin	✔	✔	✔	✔	Advanced
Episode 4 (July 6, 2025)	1	Kai Capiral	7	Pasay City	"Liwanag sa Dilim" –- Rivermaya	✔	✔	✔	✔	Advanced
Episode 4 (July 6, 2025)	2	Monique Naga	10	Camalig, Albay	"Kisapmata" – Rivermaya	✔	✔	✔	✔	Advanced
Episode 4 (July 6, 2025)	3	Kurt Nathaniel B. Lizardo	6	Tanauan City, Batangas	"Nosi Ba Lasi" – Sampaguita	✔	✔	✘	✘	Eliminated
Episode 4 (July 6, 2025)	4	Uzzia Benedicto	12	Batangas	"Di Na Muli" – Janine Teñoso	✔	✘	✔	✔	Advanced
Episode 4 (July 6, 2025)	5	Sean Lorenz Bernardez	12	Navotas City	" Rise Up" – Andra Day	✔	✔	✔	✔	Advanced
Episode 5 (July 12, 2025)	1	Aleina Gabrielli Magbuhat	7	Batangas City	"Salamat, Salamat Musika" – Nanette Inventor	✔	✔	✔	✔	Advanced
Episode 5 (July 12, 2025)	2	Allana Halferty	10	Calamba, Laguna	"Can't Help Falling In Love" – Elvis Presley	✔	✘	✔	✘	Eliminated
Episode 5 (July 12, 2025)	3	MJ	6	Laguna	"You Are Not Alone" – Michael Jackson	✘	✘	✘	✔	Eliminated
Episode 5 (July 12, 2025)	4	Alexis Dela Cruz	10	Pasay City	"At Ang Hirap" – Angeline Quinto	✔	✔	✔	✔	Advanced
Episode 5 (July 12, 2025)	5	Francheska Paula Cape	12	Negros Occidental	"Follow Your Dream" – Sheryn Regis	✔	✔	✔	✔	Advanced
Episode 6 (July 13, 2025)	1	Ethan Caspe	9	Antipolo City	"Dilaw" – Maki	✔	✔	✔	✔	Advanced
Episode 6 (July 13, 2025)	2	Julia Rinoah Francisco	8	Bacoor, Cavite	"Next in Line" – After Image	✔	✔	✔	✔	Advanced
Episode 6 (July 13, 2025)	3	Jared Denz Gabriel Limboy	8	Sta. Maria, Bulacan	"Sana" – Jolina Magdangal	✘	✘	✔	✘	Eliminated
Episode 6 (July 13, 2025)	4	Yarrah Isabel S. Ledesma	12	Bacolod City	"Akin Ka Na Lang" – Morisette	✔	✘	✘	✔	Eliminated
Episode 6 (July 13, 2025)	5	Sofie Marco	10	Cainta, Rizal	"Banal na Aso, Santong Kabayo" – Yano	✔	✔	✔	✔	Advanced
Episode 7 (July 19, 2025)	1	Jenard Cuestas	12	Caloocan City	"Simpleng Tulad Mo" – Daniel Padilla	✔	✔	✔	✔	Advanced
Episode 7 (July 19, 2025)	2	Safhia Legaspi	10	Tagbilaran City, Bohol	"My Love Will See You Through" – Marco Sison	✔	✔	✔	✔	Advanced
Episode 7 (July 19, 2025)	3	Danires Jilian "Dani" Espina	11	Lipa City, Batangas	"Sundo" – Imago	✔	✔	✔	✘	Advanced
Episode 7 (July 19, 2025)	4	Marcio Ezekiel Cano	11	General Trias, Cavite	"Himala" – Rivermaya	✔	✔	✘	✔	Advanced
Episode 7 (July 19, 2025)	5	Juz Pacat	8	Malabon	"Totoy Bibo" – Vhong Navarro	✔	✘	✔	✘	Eliminated
Episode 7 (July 19, 2025)	6	Princess Khasy Moreno	9	San Jose del Monte, Bulacan	"Iingatan Ka" – Carol Banawa	✔	✔	✔	✔	Advanced
Episode 8 (July 20, 2025)	1	Divine Grace Damos	12	Cebu City	"Hawak Kamay" – Yeng Constantino	✘	✔	✔	✔	Advanced
Episode 8 (July 20, 2025)	2	Corine Isabelle "Belle" Almasin	7	Valenzuela City	"Sa Ugoy ng Duyan" – Lucio San Pedro & Levi Celerio	✔	✘	✔	✔	Advanced
Episode 8 (July 20, 2025)	3	Johnny Junior Morris	12	Subic, Zambales	"Sa Aking Puso" – Ariel Rivera	✔	✘	✔	✔	Advanced
Episode 8 (July 20, 2025)	4	Quinn Chelsea Holmes	6	Cainta, Rizal	"Kumpas" – Moira dela Torre	✔	✔	✔	✔	Advanced
Episode 8 (July 20, 2025)	5	Ellie Jimenez	8	—	"Miss Kita Pag Tuesday" – RJ Jimenez	✔	✔	✘	✘	Eliminated
Episode 8 (July 20, 2025)	6	John Ezekiel "Kiel" Colonel	8	Cainta, Rizal	"Mama" – Smokey Mountain	✔	✔	✔	✔	Advanced
Episode 9 (July 26, 2025)	1	Abatar Junior Dakdak	6	Las Piñas City	"Sabihin" - Zelle	✔	✔	✔	✔	Advanced
Episode 9 (July 26, 2025)	2	Zoe Zimbe	12	Montalban, Rizal	"Sa Ugoy ng Duyan" – Lucio San Pedro & Levi Celerio	✔	✘	✘	✔	Eliminated
Episode 9 (July 26, 2025)	3	Franz Joseph "Kiko" Valenzuela	9	Balete, Batangas	"Lipad" – Lea Salonga	✔	✔	✔	✔	Advanced
Episode 9 (July 26, 2025)	4	Jun-jun "Jun" Arag	9	Silang, Cavite	"Say You'll Never Go" – Neocolours	✔	✘	✔	✘	Eliminated
Episode 9 (July 26, 2025)	5	Andrea Flores	10	Pandi, Bulacan	"Wala Na Bang Pag-ibig?" – Jaya	✔	✔	✔	✔	Advanced
Episode 9 (July 26, 2025)	6	Kean Vicente	11	Olongapo City	"Di Na Muli" - Janine Teñoso	✔	✔	✔	✔	Advanced
Episode 10 (July 27, 2025)	1	Sofia Andrea Pacencia	9	Cebu	"This is the Moment" – Colm Wilkinson (Erik Santos cover)	✔	✔	✔	✔	Advanced
Episode 10 (July 27, 2025)	2	Lucho Emmanuel Rara	10	Cabanatuan City, Nueva Ecjia	"Kahit Maputi Na Ang Buhok Ko" – Rey Valera	✘	✔	✘	✔	Eliminated
Episode 10 (July 27, 2025)	3	Miguel "Miggy" Agulay	11	Tondo, Manila	"Pasilyo" – SunKissed Lola	✔	✔	✔	✘	Advanced
Episode 10 (July 27, 2025)	4	Amirah Misha Cayetano	10	Cabanatuan City, Nueva Ecjia	"I Wanna Dance with Somebody (Who Loves Me)" – Whitney Houston	✔	✔	✘	✘	Eliminated
Episode 10 (July 27, 2025)	5	Keisha Joy Auron	10	Cebu City	"Maybe This Time" – Michael Martin Murphey (Sarah Geronimo cover)	✔	✔	✔	✔	Advanced
Episode 11 (August 2, 2025)	1	Alexandra "Alex" Patricio	11	Nueva Ecija	"Nasa Puso" – Janine Berdin	✔	✔	✔	✔	Advanced
Episode 11 (August 2, 2025)	2	Migz Sto. Domingo	6	Bulacan	"Ang Buhay Ko" – Asin	✔	✘	✘	✔	Eliminated
Episode 11 (August 2, 2025)	3	Ayen Manzano	11	Bacoor, Cavite	"Tao" – Sampaguita	✔	✔	✔	✔	Advanced
Episode 11 (August 2, 2025)	4	Adriel Garcia	12	Tondo, Manila	"Fallen" – Lola Amour	✘	✔	✘	✔	Eliminated
Episode 11 (August 2, 2025)	5	Brent Matthew Gonzales	10	Lipa City, Batangas	"Raining in Manila" – Lola Amour	✘	✘	✔	✘	Eliminated
Episode 11 (August 2, 2025)	6	Franchesca Aleia Payunan	10	Calamba City, Laguna	"Duyan" – Sarah Geronimo	✔	✔	✘	✔	Advanced
Episode 12 (August 3, 2025)	1	Mary Jean Grace "MJ" Alcano	10	Tanauan City, Batangas	"Balut" – The New Minstrels	✔	✔	✔	✔	Advanced
Episode 12 (August 3, 2025)	2	Kiera Rumi Nakamura	7	Japan / Taguig City	"Isa Pang Araw" – Sarah Geronimo	✔	✘	✘	✘	Eliminated
Episode 12 (August 3, 2025)	3	Arwen Delfin	13	Pasay City	"Till I Met You" – Angeline Quinto	✔	✔	✔	✔	Advanced
Episode 12 (August 3, 2025)	4	Gianna Salva	7	San Pedro, Laguna	"Patuloy ang Pangarap" – Angeline Quinto	✔	✔	✔	✘	Advanced
Episode 12 (August 3, 2025)	5	John Theon Noyales	10	Malabon City	"Iduyan Mo" – Basil Valdez	✔	✔	✘	✔	Advanced
Episode 12 (August 3, 2025)	6	Samantha Braga	8	Taguig City	"Ngayon At Kailanman" – Basil Valdez	✔	✔	✔	✔	Advanced
Episode 13 (August 9, 2025)	1	Fatima Sala	12	Pilar, Bohol	"Bakit Nga Ba Mahal Kita" – Roselle Nava	✔	✘	✔	✔	Advanced
Episode 13 (August 9, 2025)	2	Jay-R Cayago	12	Calasiao, Pangasinan	"Tagumpay Nating Lahat" – Lea Salonga	✔	✔	✔	✔	Advanced
Episode 13 (August 9, 2025)	3	Kelsy Serrano	6	Taguig City	"Batang-Bata Ka Pa" – Apo Hiking Society	✔	✘	✘	✔	Eliminated
Episode 13 (August 9, 2025)	4	Scarlet Marco	7	Biñan City, Laguna	"Isa Pang Araw" – Sarah Geronimo	✔	✘	✘	✔	Eliminated
Episode 13 (August 9, 2025)	5	Rain Vinegas	7	Bacoor, Cavite	"Home (The Wiz song)" – Diana Ross	✔	✔	✔	✔	Advanced
Episode 13 (August 9, 2025)	6	Katherine Rillones	11	San Jose del Monte, Bulacan	“Pangarap Na Bituin" – Sharon Cuneta	✔	✔	✔	✔	Advanced
Episode 14 (August 10, 2025)	1	Zian Visitacion	12	Dipolog City, Zamboanga del Norte	"Anak" – Freddie Aguilar	✔	✔	✘	✔	Advanced
Episode 14 (August 10, 2025)	2	Reign Israel Amar	9	Mandaluyong City	"Ikaw ay Ako" – Morisette and Klarisse de Guzman	✔	✘	✔	✘	Eliminated
Episode 14 (August 10, 2025)	3	Dexter Salvacion	12	Sta. Ana, Manila	"Tatsulok" – Buklod (Bamboo cover)	✔	✔	✔	✔	Advanced
Episode 14 (August 10, 2025)	4	Silva Sayen Silva	9	Lipa City, Batangas	"Maybe This Time" – Michael Martin Murphey (Sarah Geronimo cover)	✔	✔	✔	✔	Advanced
Episode 14 (August 10, 2025)	5	Zane Agustin Raga	8	Kawit, Cavite	"Natutulog Ba Ang Diyos?" – Gary Valenciano	✘	✔	✔	✘	Eliminated
Episode 14 (August 10, 2025)	6	Nicaella Jane Palado	10	Taguig City	"Pusong Ligaw" – Jericho Rosales (Jona cover)	✔	✘	✔	✘	Eliminated
Episode 14 (August 10, 2025)	7	Lyndon Mclean Amalapad	8	Quezon City	"Kulang Ako Kung Wala Ka" – Erik Santos	✔	✘	✔	✘	Eliminated
Episode 14 (August 10, 2025)	8	Rain Sally Enero	11	Negros Oriental	"Maging Sino Ka Man" – Rey Valera	✔	✔	✔	✘	Advanced
Episode 15 (August 16, 2025)	1	Billy Lontayao	12	Taguig City	"Sumayaw Ka" – Gloc-9	✔	✔	✔	✔	Advanced
Episode 15 (August 16, 2025)	2	Rhiyanah Marie Duropan	9	Las Piñas City	"Lipad Ng Pangarap" – Dessa	✔	✘	✘	✔	Eliminated
Episode 15 (August 16, 2025)	3	Jessica Mingels	12	Miagao, Iloilo	"Pasilyo" – SunKissed Lola	✔	✘	✘	✔	Eliminated
Episode 15 (August 16, 2025)	4	Aaleyah Jade Nembresa	10	Nueva Ecija	"Akin Ka Na Lang" – Morisette	✘	✘	✔	✘	Eliminated
Episode 15 (August 16, 2025)	5	Zoe Aguilar	11	Las Piñas City	"Babalik Sa'yo" – Moira dela Torre	✘	✔	✔	✔	Advanced
Episode 15 (August 16, 2025)	6	Meerah Respicio	7	Quezon City	"Salamat" – Yeng Constantino	✔	✘	✔	✔	Advanced
Episode 15 (August 16, 2025)	7	Marchelle Mercado	9	Cavite	"Till I Met You" – Angeline Quinto	✔	✔	✔	✘	Advanced
Episode 16 (August 17, 2025)	1	Leisah Baconga	12	Pasig City / Cagayan de Oro City	"Karera" – Bini	✔	✔	✔	✔	Advanced
Episode 16 (August 17, 2025)	2	Jirah Giganto	12	Cadiz City, Negros Occidental	"Kahit Ayaw Mo Na" – This Band	✔	✔	✘	✔	Advanced
Episode 16 (August 17, 2025)	3	Maine Biazon	6	General Mariano Alvarez, Cavite	"Muling Buksan Ang Puso" – Basil Valdez	✔	✘	✘	✔	Eliminated
Episode 16 (August 17, 2025)	4	Jewel Arintoc	13	Calauag, Quezon	"Ikaw Ang Aking Mahal" – Regine Velasquez	✔	✘	✔	✔	Advanced
Episode 16 (August 17, 2025)	5	Chloe Nathalie Simborio	12	Bulacan	"Proud Mary" – Creedence Clearwater Revival (Tina Turner cover)	?	?	✔	?	Advanced
Episode 16 (August 17, 2025)	6	Bella Alodia	13	Caloocan City	"Amakabogera" – Maymay Entrata	?	?	?	✔	Advanced
Episode 16 (August 17, 2025)	7	Jinwen Sumanda	10	Rodriguez, Rizal	Unknown (Audition montaged)	?	✔	?	?	Advanced
Episode 16 (August 17, 2025)	8	Cataleya Cruz	12	Tanza, Cavite	Unknown (Audition montaged)	✔	?	?	?	Advanced
Episode 16 (August 17, 2025)	9	Samantha Romando	10	San Pedro, Laguna	"Rain" – Donna Cruz (Sarah Geronimo cover)	✔	✔	✘	✔	Advanced

== Midrounds ==
The midrounds were recorded at Studio 10 in ABS-CBN Broadcasting Center at Dilliman, Quezon City and first aired on August 23, 2025. All 67 hopefuls were grouped to six, with each group consisting of eleven (5 groups) or twelve (1 group) members. Each group only has three hopefuls advancing to the semifinals–two selected by the judges and one selected by audience score. The audience score has the audience grade each of the remaining hopefuls from 1 to 100. In total, 18 hopefuls advanced to the live semifinals.

Composer Raul Mitra and Ana Graham served as the guest mentors for this round, with Mitra mentoring the first, second, and fifth groups and Graham for the third, fourth, and sixth groups.

Color Key:

Contestant was saved by the audience votes and advanced to the semifinals
Contestant was selected by the judges to advance to the semifinals
Contestant was eliminated

Midrounds Details
Episode	Order	Contestant	Song	Result (Score)
Episode 17 (August 23, 2025)	1	Aleina Magbuhat	"Time In" – Yeng Constantino	Eliminated
Episode 17 (August 23, 2025)	2	Marcio Cano	"Nakapagtataka" – Apo Hiking Society	Eliminated
Episode 17 (August 23, 2025)	3	Leisah Baconga	"Tsada Mahigugma" – Maymay Entrata	Advanced
Episode 17 (August 23, 2025)	4	Miggy Agulay	"Raining in Manila" – Lola Amour	Advanced
Episode 17 (August 23, 2025)	5	Yassi Estrera	"Tao" – Sampaguita	Advanced (98.53%)
Episode 17 (August 23, 2025)	6	Kiel Colonel	Unknown (Performance montaged)	Eliminated
Episode 17 (August 23, 2025)	7	Dani Espina	Unknown (Performance montaged)	Eliminated
Episode 17 (August 23, 2025)	8	Marchelle Mercado	"Hawak Mo" – Lyka Estrella	Eliminated
Episode 17 (August 23, 2025)	9	Belle Almasin	Unknown (Performance montaged)	Eliminated
Episode 17 (August 23, 2025)	10	Divine Damos	Unknown (Performance montaged)	Eliminated
Episode 17 (August 23, 2025)	11	Safhia Legaspi	"Bakit Nga Ba Mahal Kita" – Roselle Nava	Eliminated
Episode 18 (August 24, 2025)	1	Gab Balasabas	"Minamahal Kita" – Freddie Aguilar	Advanced
Episode 18 (August 24, 2025)	2	Rifa Amatonding	"Patuloy ang Pangarap" – Angeline Quinto	Eliminated
Episode 18 (August 24, 2025)	3	Francheska Cape	"Upuan" – Gloc-9 ft. Jeazell Grutas	Advanced
Episode 18 (August 24, 2025)	4	Zoe Aguilar	"Sana" – Ice Seguerra	Eliminated
Episode 18 (August 24, 2025)	5	Ayen Manzano	"Anak Ng Pasig" – Geneva Cruz	Eliminated
Episode 18 (August 24, 2025)	6	Samantha Romano	"Diamante" – Morisette	Eliminated
Episode 18 (August 24, 2025)	7	Chloe Simborio	"Bulag, Pipi, at Bingi" – Freddie Aguilar	Eliminated
Episode 18 (August 24, 2025)	8	Marvian Malabanan	"Isang Lahi" – Regine Velasquez	Eliminated
Episode 18 (August 24, 2025)	9	Kiko Valenzuela	"Ngayon" – Basil Valdez	Eliminated
Episode 18 (August 24, 2025)	10	Yanyan Atienza	"Sino Ang Baliw" – Mon del Rosario	Eliminated
Episode 18 (August 24, 2025)	11	Klied Cuangco	"I Can" – Donna Cruz, Regine Velasquez, and Mikee Cojuangco	Advanced (98.11%)
Episode 19 (August 30, 2025)	1	Katherine Rillones	"Mundo" – IV of Spades	Eliminated
Episode 19 (August 30, 2025)	2	Jay-R Cayago	"Kunin Mo Na Ang Lahat Sa Akin" – Formula (Angeline Quinto cover)	Eliminated
Episode 19 (August 30, 2025)	3	Andrea Flores	"Home" – Diana Ross	Advanced
Episode 19 (August 30, 2025)	4	Prince Luna	Unknown (Performance montaged)	Eliminated
Episode 19 (August 30, 2025)	5	Bella Alodia	Unknown (Performance montaged)	Eliminated
Episode 19 (August 30, 2025)	6	Monique Naga	Unknown (Performance montaged)	Eliminated
Episode 19 (August 30, 2025)	7	Rain Vinegas	Unknown (Performance montaged)	Eliminated
Episode 19 (August 30, 2025)	8	Dexter Salvacion	Unknown (Performance montaged)	Eliminated
Episode 19 (August 30, 2025)	9	Alexa Mendoza	"Banal Na Aso, Santong Kabayo" – Yano (Janine Berdin cover)	Advanced (99.47%)
Episode 19 (August 30, 2025)	10	Kai Capiral	"Mangarap Ka" – AfterImage	Eliminated
Episode 19 (August 30, 2025)	11	Kara Gabrielle Lopez	"Palagi" – TJ Monterde	Advanced
Episode 20 (August 31, 2025)	1	Ethan Gaspe	"Namumula" – Maki	Eliminated
Episode 20 (August 31, 2025)	2	Sofie Marco	"Isa Pang Araw" – Sarah Geronimo	Eliminated
Episode 20 (August 31, 2025)	3	Uzzia Benedicto	Unknown (Performance montaged)	Eliminated
Episode 20 (August 31, 2025)	4	Sayen Silva	Unknown (Performance montaged)	Eliminated
Episode 20 (August 31, 2025)	5	Theon Noyales	Unknown (Performance montaged)	Eliminated
Episode 20 (August 31, 2025)	6	Cataleya Cruz	Unknown (Performance montaged)	Eliminated
Episode 20 (August 31, 2025)	7	Gianna Salva	Unknown (Performance montaged)	Eliminated
Episode 20 (August 31, 2025)	8	Sean Lorenz Bernardez	"Lipad Ng Pangarap" – Dessa	Advanced (99.32%)
Episode 20 (August 31, 2025)	9	Julia Rinoah Francisco	"Awit Ng Kabataan" – Rivermaya	Eliminated
Episode 20 (August 31, 2025)	10	Samantha Braga	"Di Na Muli" – Janine Teñoso	Advanced
Episode 20 (August 31, 2025)	11	Kean Vicente	"Ikaw ay Ako" – Morisette and Klarisse de Guzman	Advanced
Episode 21 (September 6, 2025)	1	Natalie Javier	"Mamang Sorbetero" – Celeste Legaspi	Eliminated
Episode 21 (September 6, 2025)	2	Matteo Liam delos Ama	Unknown (Performance montaged)	Eliminated
Episode 21 (September 6, 2025)	3	Franchesca Aleia Payunan	Unknown (Performance montaged)	Eliminated
Episode 21 (September 6, 2025)	4	Alex Patricio	Unknown (Performance montaged)	Eliminated
Episode 21 (September 6, 2025)	5	Jewel Arintoc	Unknown (Performance montaged)	Eliminated
Episode 21 (September 6, 2025)	6	Billy Xander Lontayao	"Uhaw" (R&B version) - Dilaw	Eliminated
Episode 21 (September 6, 2025)	7	MJ Alcano	"Kailan Kaya" – Sheryn Regis	Advanced (97.75%)
Episode 21 (September 6, 2025)	8	Jinwen Sumanda	"Last Dance" – Donna Summer	Eliminated
Episode 21 (September 6, 2025)	9	Quinn Holmes	"Pasilyo" – SunKissed Lola	Advanced
Episode 21 (September 6, 2025)	10	Alexis Dela Cruz	"Pagsubok" – Orient Pearl	Eliminated
Episode 21 (September 6, 2025)	11	Khasy Moreno	"Follow Your Dreams" – Sheryn Regis	Advanced
Episode 22 (September 7, 2025)	1	John Paul Miguel Ramusu Nabong	Unknown (Performance montaged)	Eliminated
Episode 22 (September 7, 2025)	2	Sofia Andrea Pacencia	Unknown (Performance montaged)	Eliminated
Episode 22 (September 7, 2025)	3	Meerah Respicio	Unknown (Performance montaged)	Eliminated
Episode 22 (September 7, 2025)	4	Johnny Morris	Unknown (Performance montaged)	Eliminated
Episode 22 (September 7, 2025)	5	Zian Visitacion	Unknown (Performance montaged)	Eliminated
Episode 22 (September 7, 2025)	6	Arwen Delfin	Unknown (Performance montaged)	Eliminated
Episode 22 (September 7, 2025)	7	Abatar Dakdak	"Dahil Sa'yo" – Iñigo Pascual	Advanced
Episode 22 (September 7, 2025)	8	Keisha Auron	"Forever Is Not Enough" – Sarah Geronimo	Advanced (98.12%)
Episode 22 (September 7, 2025)	9	Rain Sally Enero	"Saan Darating Ang Umaga" – Raymond Lauchengco	Eliminated
Episode 22 (September 7, 2025)	10	Jirah Giganto	"Habang Ako'y Nabubuhay" – Sanshai	Advanced
Episode 22 (September 7, 2025)	11	Jenard Cuestas	"Saan?" – Maki	Eliminated
Episode 22 (September 7, 2025)	12	Fatima Sala	"Your Love" – Alamid	Eliminated

== Live shows ==
The live shows aired for three weeks from September 13 to 28, 2025 at ABS-CBN Studio 10, with the first two weeks being the semi-finals and the third and last week being the grand finals.

During the semi-finals, nine hopefuls performed each week, with three advancing to the grand finals. The first slot was awarded to the contestant who received the highest percentage of votes from the public, while the other two were chosen based on the judges’ top two scores. Voting opened after all hopefuls had performed, conducted through online voting via joinnow.ph. Raul Mitra reprised his role as the overall mentor for this round.

In a unique mechanic of Idol Kids Philippines, the usual weekly themes used in the regular editions were not applied during the live shows, allowing each hopeful to freely choose any song they wished to perform.

Starting from this round, Jeremy Glinoga replaced Emilio Daez as online host.

Contestant was saved by the public vote
Contestant was saved by the judges' scores
Contestant was saved after receiving the highest combined public and judges' scores
Contestant was eliminated

=== Week 1: Semifinals – part 1 (September 13 and 14) ===
Colet Vergara and Maloi Ricalde of Bini served as guest mentors for this week.

Episode	Order	Contestant	Song	Public Vote	Judges' Scores	Result
Episode 23 (September 13, 2025)	1	Alexa Mendoza	"Sirena" – Gloc-9	28.01%	Unrevealed	Advanced
Episode 23 (September 13, 2025)	2	Keisha Auron	"Porque" – Maldita	Unrevealed	Unrevealed	Eliminated
Episode 23 (September 13, 2025)	3	Gab Balibalos	"Mangarap Ka" – AfterImage	Unrevealed	Unrevealed	Eliminated
Episode 23 (September 13, 2025)	4	Khasy Moreno	"And I Am Telling You I'm Not Going" – Jennifer Holliday	Unrevealed	Unrevealed	Eliminated
Episode 23 (September 13, 2025)	5	Kean Vicente	"Istorya" – The Juans	Unrevealed	Unrevealed	Eliminated
Episode 23 (September 13, 2025)	6	Kara Gabrielle Lopez	"Tadhana" – UDD	Unrevealed	Unrevealed	Eliminated
Episode 24 (September 14, 2025)	7	Abatar Dacdac	"Nang Dumating Ka" – Bandang Lapis	Unrevealed	Unrevealed	Eliminated
Episode 24 (September 14, 2025)	8	Quinn Holmes	"Leaves" – Ben&Ben	Unrevealed	92.75%	Advanced
Episode 24 (September 14, 2025)	9	MJ Alcano	"River" – Bishop Briggs	Unrevealed	97.00%	Advanced

Non-competition Performances
Order	Performer	Song
24.1	Maki	"Namumula" / "Dilaw"

=== Week 2: Semifinals – part 2 (September 20 and 21) ===
Jonathan Manalo and Yeng Constantino served as guest mentors for this week.

Episode	Order	Contestant	Song	Public Vote	Judges' Scores	Result
Episode 25 (September 20, 2025)	1	Yassi Abaya Estrera	"Anak" – Freddie Aguilar	Unrevealed	91.25%	Advanced
Episode 25 (September 20, 2025)	2	Miggy Agulay	"Uhaw" – Dilaw	Unrevealed	Unrevealed	Eliminated
Episode 25 (September 20, 2025)	3	Andrea Flores	"Sometimes You Just Know" – Jaya	Unrevealed	Unrevealed	Eliminated
Episode 25 (September 20, 2025)	4	Samantha Braga	"Malay Ko" – Daniel Padilla	Unrevealed	Unrevealed	Eliminated
Episode 25 (September 20, 2025)	5	Klied Cuangco	"Liwanag sa Dilim" – Rivermaya	24.83%	Unrevealed	Advanced
Episode 26 (September 21, 2025)
Episode 26 (September 21, 2025)	6	Francheska Paula Cape	"Kilometro" – Sarah Geronimo	Unrevealed	Unrevealed	Eliminated
Episode 26 (September 21, 2025)	7	Leisah Baconga	"Someday" – Nina	Unrevealed	Unrevealed	Eliminated
Episode 26 (September 21, 2025)	8	Jirah Giganto	"With a Smile" – Eraserheads	Unrevealed	Unrevealed	Eliminated
Episode 26 (September 21, 2025)	9	Sean Lorenz Bernardez	"Himala" – Rivermaya	Unrevealed	95.25%	Advanced

Non-competition Performances
Order	Performer	Song
25.1	Khimo Gumatay	"Isayaw Mo Lang"
26.1	BGYO	"Headlines"

=== Week 3: The Final Showdown (September 27 and 28) ===
==== Part 1: Top 6 (September 27) ====
As with the previous round, scores are based on the average scores of both judges' scores and public votes. The top three hopefuls with the highest vote percentages advance to the second and final round the next day.

Episode	Order	Contestant	Song	Combined Score	Result
Episode 27 (September 27, 2025)	1	MJ Alcano	"Orange Colored Sky" – Nat King Cole	72.19%	Eliminated
Episode 27 (September 27, 2025)	2	Yassi Abaya Estrera	"Scared to Death" – KZ Tandingan	71.13%	Eliminated
Episode 27 (September 27, 2025)	3	Klied Cuangco	"3019" – Dilaw	84.00%	Advanced
Episode 27 (September 27, 2025)	4	Quinn Holmes	"You'll Be Safe Here" – Rico Blanco	80.63%	Advanced
Episode 27 (September 27, 2025)	5	Sean Lorenz Bernardez	"Salbabida" – Kyla	72.75%	Eliminated
Episode 27 (September 27, 2025)	6	Alexa Mendoza	"Kisapmata" – Rivermaya	98.69%	Advanced

Non-competition Performances
Order	Performer	Song
27.1	TJ Monterde	"Palagi" / "Unang Halik"

==== Part 2: Top 3 (September 28) ====
Each contestant performed two songs: a song of their choosing that reflected their journey throughout the competition, and an original song written for them. Voting for the winner opened after all six performances and closed shortly thereafter.

Episode	Contestant	Round 1 (Journey Song)		Round 2 (Original Song)			Score	Result
Episode	Contestant	Order	Song	Order	Song	Composer	Score	Result
Episode 28 (September 28, 2025)	Quinn Holmes	1	"Araw-Araw" – Ben&Ben	5	"Dalangin"	Ainna Antiporda	80.99%	Third place
Episode 28 (September 28, 2025)	Klied Cuangco	2	"Tupad Na Ang Pangarap" – Camille Santos & Trina Belamide	6	"Pakinggan Mo"	Dana Balagtas	85.38%	Runner-up
Episode 28 (September 28, 2025)	Alexa Mendoza	3	"Ang Huling El Bimbo" – Eraserheads	4	"Maaabot Ko"	Dennis Campañer	98.88%	Winner

Non-competition Performances
Order	Performer
28.1	Vhong Navarro and Jhong Hilario

== Elimination Chart ==
Color key

Female contestant
Male contestant
Winner
Runner-up
Third place
Did not perform
Saved by the public
Saved by Judges
Safe
Highest Score
Eliminated

Rank	Contestant	Midrounds						Semifinals		Finals	
Rank	Contestant	Group 1	Group 2	Group 3	Group 4	Group 5	Group 6	Week 1	Week 2	Top 6	Top 3
1	Alexa Mendoza			Advanced; 99.47%				Advanced; 28.01%		1st 98.69%	Winner; 98.88%
2	Klied Cuangco		Advanced; 98.11%						Advanced; 24.83%	2nd 84.00%	Runner-Up; 85.38%
3	Quinn Holmes					Advanced		Advanced; 92.75%		3rd 80.63%	3rd 80.99%
4	Sean Lorenz Bernardez				Advanced; 99.32%				Advanced; 95.25%	4th 72.75%	
5	MJ Alcano					Advanced; 97.75%		Advanced; 97.00%		5th 72.19%	
6	Yassi Estrera	Advanced; 98.53%							Advanced; 91.25%	6th 71.13%	
7–12	Andrea Flores			Advanced					Eliminated		
7–12	Francheska Cape		Advanced						Eliminated		
7–12	Jirah Giganto						Advanced		Eliminated		
7–12	Leisah Baconga	Advanced							Eliminated		
7–12	Miggy Agulay	Advanced							Eliminated		
7–12	Samantha Braga				Advanced				Eliminated		
13–18	Abatar Dakdak						Advanced	Eliminated			
13–18	Gab Balasabas		Advanced					Eliminated			
13–18	Kara Gabrielle Lopez			Advanced				Eliminated			
13–18	Kean Vicente				Advanced			Eliminated			
13–18	Keisha Auron						Advanced; 98.12%	Eliminated			
13–18	Khasy Moreno					Advanced		Eliminated			
