= Habangbuhay Pansamantala =

Single by Maki
- Language: Tagalog
- English title: Temporary Forever
- Released: May 24, 2026
- Genre: Pop
- Length: 4:09
- Label: Tarsier
- Songwriter: Ralph William Datoon
- Producers: Jacob Clemente; Jovel Rivera; Maki; Tati de Mesa

Maki singles chronology
"Turning Green" (2025)	"Habangbuhay Pansamantala" (2026)

"Habangbuhay Pansamantala" (stylized in small caps; transl. Temporary Forever; also known as "pink song") is a song by the Filipino singer-songwriter Maki. It was released as a digital single by Tarsier Records on May 24, 2026. It was written by Ralph William Datoon, along with the producers Jacob Clemente, Joven Rivera, Maki, and Tati de Mesa.

== Background and release ==
On November 7, 2025, Maki and the American pop duo Joan released "Turning Green" as a digital single from Maki's debut album Kolorcoaster (2026). Maki held the concert Kolorcoaster: The Concert One More Ride on February 21, 2026 at Araneta Coliseum.

On May 24, 2026, Tarsier Records released "Habangbuhay Pansamantala" as a digital single. Maki had previously referred to the song as "pink song".

== Composition ==
"Habangbuhay Pansamantala" has been described as pop song and as a soft emotional anthem that portrays love through pink colored lenses. Lyrically, the song is about unrequited feelings.

== Music video ==
The music video for "Habangbuhay Pansamantala" features Justin of the Filipino boy band SB19. In the visualizer, Justin bumps into Maki while riding a bicycle and accidentally smudge pink paint onto his uniform, paralleling the music video for "Dilaw" which featured Maloi of the Filipino girl group Bini, where yellow paint served as a recurring symbol.

== Credits ==
Credits are adapted by Apple Music and Tidal.

- Maki (Note: also credited as his real name Ralph William Datoon.) — background vocals, lead vocals, songwriter, arranger, producer
- Emil Dela Rosa — mixing engineer, assistant mastering engineer
- Ian Moscare — arranger, bass guitar
- Jacob Clemente — arranger, synthesizer
- Jet Francisco — recording engineer
- Jon Lopez — arranger, drums
- Keith Geronimo — recording engineer
- Leon Zervos — mastering engineer
- Marey Garcia — A&R Administrator
- Sammy Icaranom — arranger, electric guitar
- Star Songs, Inc. — music publisher
- Tati de Mesa — acoustic guitar, arranger, electric guitar

== Accolades ==
Award	Year	Category	Result	Ref.
Filipino Music Awards	2026	People's Choice Awards: Song	Nominated	
Filipino Music Awards	2026	Pop Song of the Year	Nominated	
