= Sharmaine, Vanessa, and Melanie =

Internet meme

Sharmaine, Vanessa, and Melanie are a series of fictional characters from an internet meme that went viral in 2026. The characters originated from a series of comedic TikTok skits by Filipino content creator Baet (Note: According to Manila Bulletin and ABS-CBN News, the original username is "Baett", while Philippine Entertainment Portal and The Philippine Star use "Baet", without the additional letter 't' at the end of the name.) (@eko06004) which featured talking fruits and insects consist of Sharmaine, an orange fruit; Vanessa, a fly; and Melanie, an avocado, who were dissatisfied with their names. The trend became gained popularity on social media exclusively in the Philippines, inspiring memes, parody, brand participation, and references in entertainment, and politics.

== Origin and spread ==
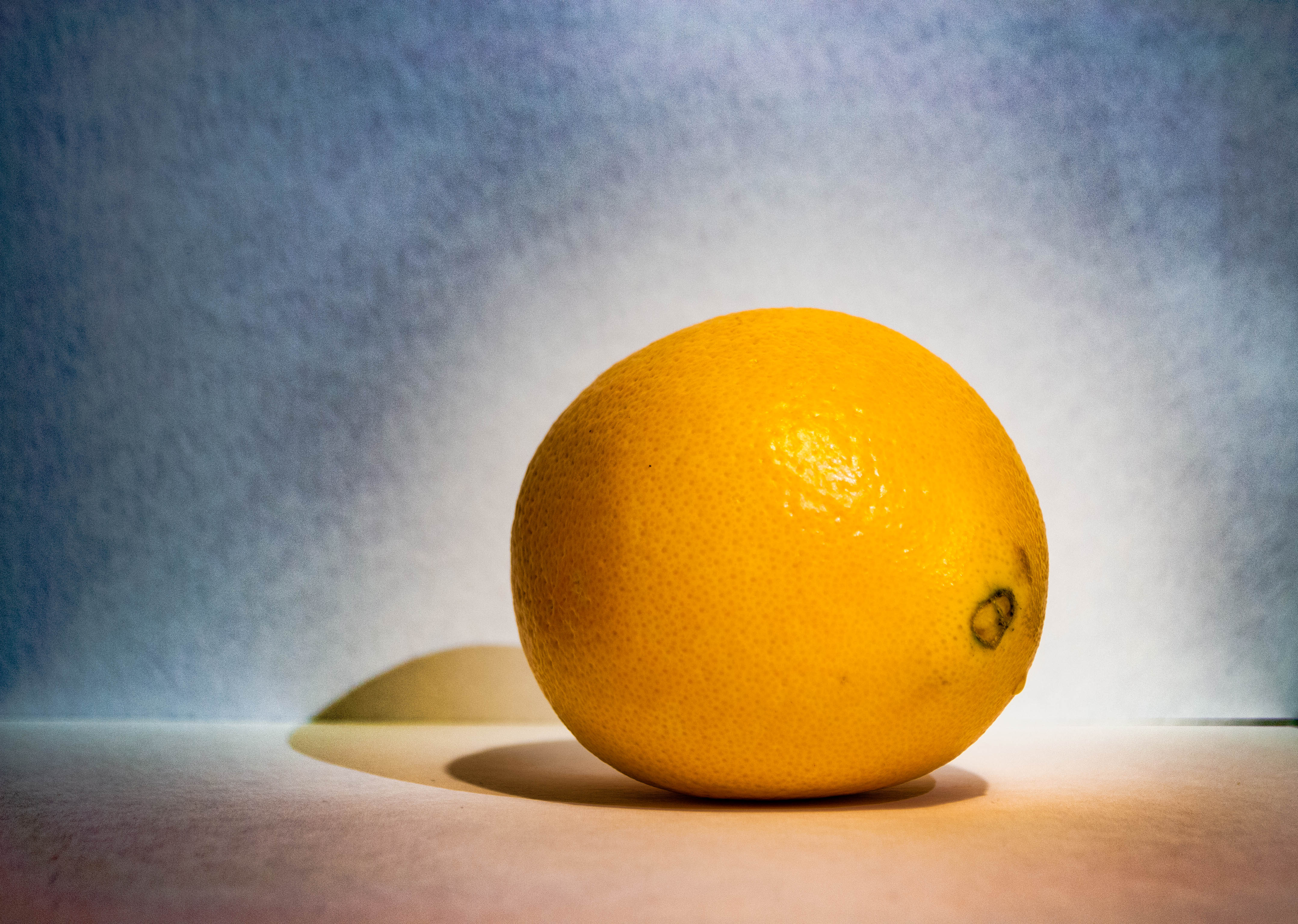
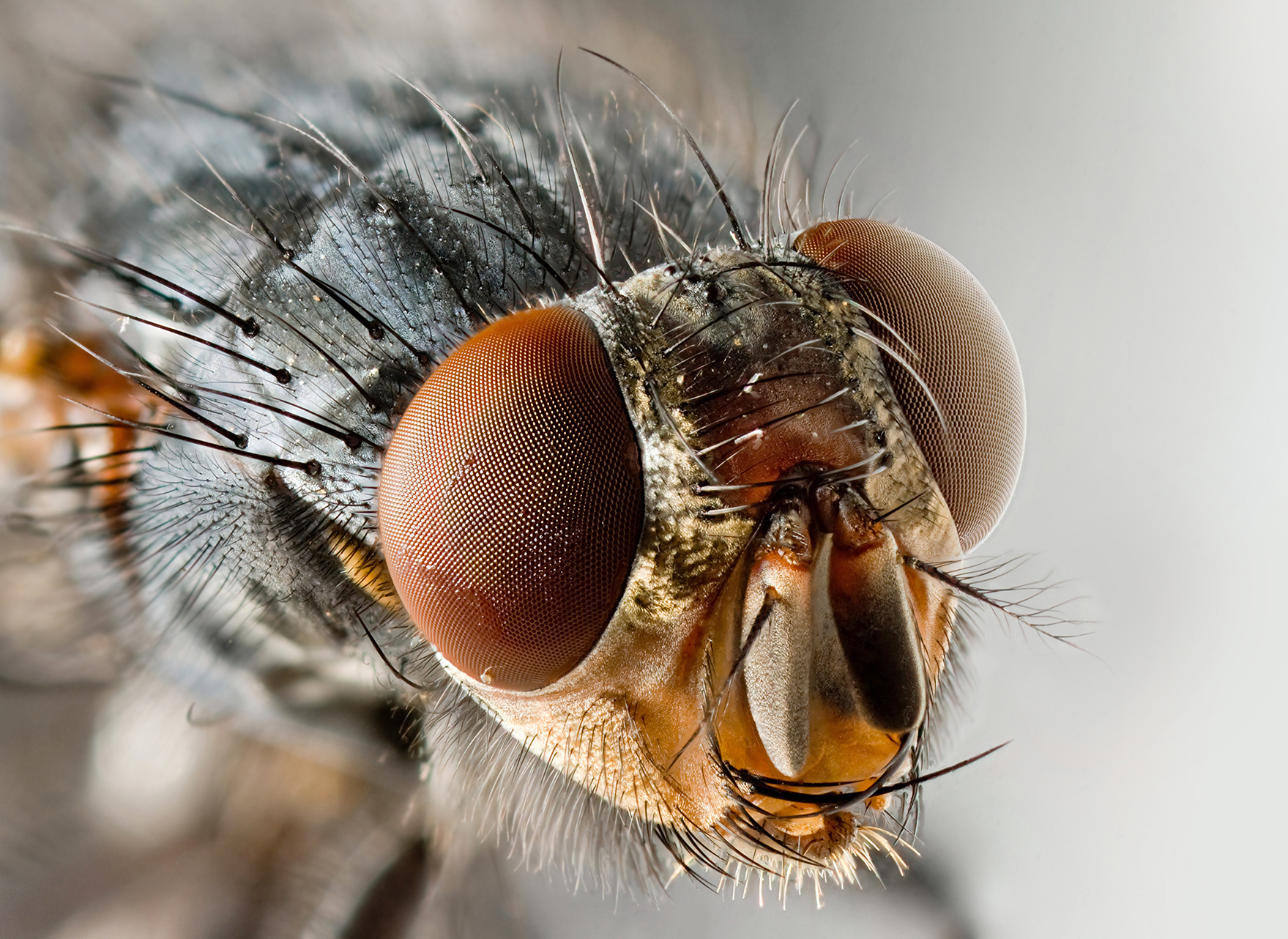
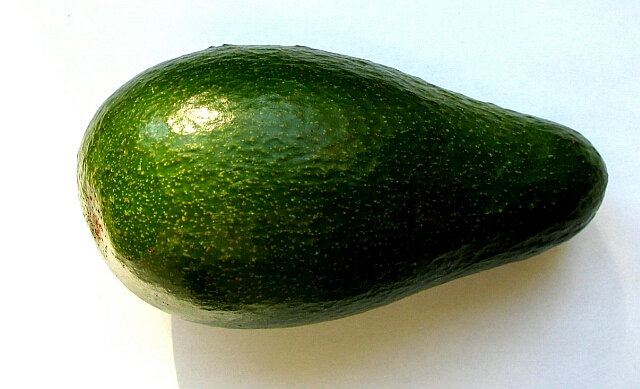
Real-life images of an orange (top), a fly (middle), and an avocado (bottom), which are commonly associated with the internet meme characters Sharmaine, Vanessa, and Melanie

The characters originated from a TikTok skit posted by Baet in which an anthropomorphic orange fruit complains that its name lacks originality because it is named after its color. The orange argues that other fruits have names unrelated to their appearance and says that it would rather be called "Sharmaine". Baet expanded the series by introducing additional characters. A fly becomes dissatisfied with being identified only as a fly and adopts the name "Vanessa", while an avocado chooses the name "Melanie" after a joke involving the similarity between avocado and abogado (lawyer). The skits also introduced recurring jokes about changing names and having them notarized.

The videos became popular on TikTok before spreading to Facebook, Instagram. People started using the names Sharmaine, Vanessa, and Melanie for oranges, flies, and avocados for memes, edited images, and parody posts began circulating online. GMA News Online reported that Baet's original Sharmaine video reached millions of views after it was posted, and later was moved beyond the original clips, with users using the characters in everyday jokes, renaming products, and making references to films, television shows, and other media.

=== Content ===
The skits started with a humorous clips that involved a fruit whose only desire was to have a more glamorous name than the one that it already had. As more skits were released, there was an introduction of more characters who got different identities and eventually created a connected group that grew popular on various social platforms. The videos were well recognized due to their humor, jokes, common scenarios were made to look like a drama through the use of misconceptions and ridiculous phrases.

== Cultural impact ==
Due to the popularity of the characters, even business and entertainment got involved. In their social media postings, Netflix made references to the trend by changing the title When Life Gives You Tangerines and Orange is the New Black. The restaurant franchise TGI Fridays and the dessert franchise Avocadoria were also not left behind by including the characters in their promotional material. Supermarkets and fruit vendors relabeled oranges as Sharmaine and avocados as Melanie, including a supermarket in SM City Legazpi that participated in the trend through promotional displays. Baet sarcastically mentioned one store where "Sharmaine" oranges could be bought since it was undergoing notarization.

The characters were referenced by musicians, comedians, and online personalities. The band Orange and Lemons jokingly proposed naming its fan club "Sharmaineans", while comedian Marlon Tapalord suggested renaming Orange and Lemons and Mojofly to fit the trend. Singer-songwriter Maki also referenced the meme through a performance associated with his song "Kahel na Langit".

In a report by JP Soriano on 24 Oras, legal experts explaining that a person's first name may be changed only under specific circumstances and that a notarized affidavit alone is insufficient to legally change a name. Senator Risa Hontiveros jokingly suggested that Sharmaine obtain a late registration of birth, while actress Sharmaine Arnaiz commented on the viral orange character after receiving messages from people who associated the meme with her name.

Public awareness campaigns by government offices have also made use of the fad. The Bureau of Plant Industry, the Philippine Rice Research Institute, and the Department of Agrarian Reform used the names Sharmaine, Vanessa, and Melanie when promoting indigenous agriculture via different posts on social media sites.
