= Dilaw =

Dilaw may refer to:

- Dilaw (band), a Filipino rock band
- "Dilaw" (song), by Maki, 2024

== See also ==
- Dilao
