= Tarsier (disambiguation) =

Tarsier is a group of small primates native to Southeast Asia.

Tarsier may also refer to:

- Tarsier Records, a record label in the Philippines
- Tarsier Studios, a Swedish video game developer
