= Bughaw =

Single by Maki

from the album Kolorcoaster
- Language: Filipino
- English title: Blue
- Released: December 1, 2024
- Genre: Indie alternative
- Length: 3:53
- Label: Tarsier Records
- Songwriters: Ralph William Datoon; Viktor Nhiko Sabiniano
- Producer: Viktor Nhiko Sabiniano

Maki singles chronology
"Namumula" (2024)	"Bughaw" (2024)	"Kahel na Langit" (2025)

Music video
- "Bughaw" on YouTube

"Bughaw" (transl. Blue), is a song by Filipino singer Maki. It was released as a digital pre-single for his debut album, Kolorcoaster, on December 1, 2024, through Tarsier Records, and was written by Ralph William Datoon and produced by Nhiko Sabiniano. "Bughaw" is an indie alternative track that captures the vibrant emotions evoked by nostalgic memories. It was a surprise release after his first solo concert, titled Maki-Concert.

== Background and release ==
Following the release of the successful singles, "Dilaw" and "Namumula," Maki performed his debut live performance of the track during his concert at the New Frontier Theatre over the weekend. Maki released the snippet of the track in a TikTok video, followed by its official release on all digital and streaming platforms.

The following day, Maki released his next single, "Bughaw".

In March 2025, Maki said that "Bughaw" was part of his upcoming first full-length album, titled Kolorcoaster and scheduled for release on September 19, 2025.

== Composition ==
"Bughaw" is three minutes and fifty-three seconds long, set in the key of C, with a tempo of 104 beats per minute. The song was composed by Ralph William Datoon and Viktor Nhiko Sabiniano, and produced by Viktor Nhiko Sabiniano. It has been described as an indie alternative track captures the vibrant emotions evoked by nostalgic memories.

During the "Maki Bughaw Hour" media conference, Maki praised the complexity of his song "Bughaw," which he believes is mature and speaks to a specific audience. The song explores the concept of longevity, highlighting the love that lasts forever, whether it's platonic or shared with friends. Maki believes that the love shared with others is a person's "blue" because they are still present. In an interview with The Philippine Star, he discussed the reasons behind his blue mood and how he manages it, stating that despite happiness, there will always be days where sadness strikes. He often feels surprised when he is crying before sleeping.

== Music video ==
Co-directed by Maki and Raliug, the music video for "Bughaw" showcases the story of four close friends—played by Hori7on’s Kyler, YGIG’s Alexei, singer Zeke Abella, and Maki himself—sharing carefree moments at the beach, painting indoors, and spending time in a quiet field. The video depicts Kyler's transformation from a quiet environment to vibrant moments with friends, highlighting the transformative power of meaningful relationships. The evolving scenes, unlike the fixed framing that symbolizes memory's permanence, symbolize emotional growth and the healing found in connection.

The video showcases Kyler's emotional support and friendship, despite moments of sadness, as he finds joy with his friends. Maki, who described the project as challenging but proud, praised it on Instagram as “one of the most challenging but also the one I’m most proud of.”

== Credits and personnel ==
Credits are adapted from Apple Music.

- Maki – vocals
- Ralph William Datoon – songwriter
- Viktor Nhiko Sabiniano – songwriter, producer

== Accolades ==
Award	Year	Category	Result	Ref.
Wish Music Awards	2026	Wishclusive Pop Song of the Year	Nominated	
