= Namumula =

2024 single by Maki

Single by Maki

from the album Kolorcoaster
- Language: Filipino
- English title: Blush
- Released: August 30, 2024
- Length: 2:54
- Label: Tarsier Records
- Songwriters: Ralph William Datoon; Viktor Nhiko Sabiniano
- Producer: Viktor Nhiko Sabiniano

Maki singles chronology
"Kurba" (2024)	"Namumula" (2024)	"Bughaw" (2024)

Audio sample
- "Namumula": file; help

Music video
- "Namumula" on YouTube

"Namumula" (transl. Blush, lit. 'Reddening') is a song by Filipino singer Maki. It was released as a digital pre-single for his debut album, Kolorcoaster, on August 30, 2024, through Tarsier Records, and was produced by Nhiko Sabiniano. The track explores the internal conflict of deciding whether to pursue someone who isn't good for you, despite potentially hurting yourself along the way.

== Background ==
Following the successful release of his chart-topping single "Dilaw" (Yellow). Maki announced the upcoming release of his digital single "Namumula", generating great anticipation among fans. Maki said that "Namumula" was dedicated to individuals who are drawn to relationships despite recognizing potential "red flags"—behaviors or signs that indicate possible future problems, addressing the emotional struggles of hopeless romantics who are drawn to these kind of relationships. Maki contrasted this with "Dilaw", highlighting the different forms of love.

== Composition ==
"Namumula" is two minutes and fifty-four seconds long, set in the key of C, with a tempo of 76 beats per minute. The song was produced by Nhiko Sabiniano and composed by him along with Maki. The track explores the internal conflict of deciding whether to pursue someone who isn't good for you, despite potentially hurting yourself along the way.

== Promotion and release ==
Maki first teased the single "Namumula" in mid-August 2024 through his social media platforms. The promotion included a preview clip of the song along with a pre-save link posted on Instagram. "Namumula", along with its music video, was released on August 30, 2024. On September 1, Maki performed "Namumula" live on ASAP Natin 'To.

In March 2025, Maki announced that "Namumula" will be part of his upcoming first full-length album, titled Kolorcoaster and scheduled for release on September 19, 2025.

On November 30, 2025, Maki joined the second edition of the Trillion Peso March against corruption at the People Power Monument in Quezon City, in which he performed a modified version of "Namumula".

== Commercial performance ==
Following its release on August 30, 2024, "Namumula" debuted at number forty-five on Billboard Philippines' Hot 100 chart.

In December 2025, "Kahel na Langit" was recognized by Apple Music Philippines among its Top OPM Songs of the year, placing ninth.

== Credits and personnel ==
Credits are adapted from Apple Music and music video.

- Maki — vocal, songwriter
- Nhiko Sabiniano — songwriter, producer

=== Music video ===
- Maki — cast
- Nhiko Sabiniano — cast
- Jannah Chua — cast
- Kerbs Balagtas — director

== Charts ==
Weekly peak chart positions for "Namumula"
Chart (2024)	Peak position
Philippines Hot 100 (Billboard Philippines)	15
Philippines Top Songs (Billboard Philippines)	6

== Accolades ==
Award	Year	Category	Result	Ref.
Awit Awards	2025	Music Video of the Year	Nominated	
P-pop Music Awards	2024	Production Design in a Music Video	Nominated	
Filipino Music Awards	2025	People’s Choice Awards: Song	Nominated	
Filipino Music Awards	2025	Pop Song of the Year	Nominated	
