= Cescau =

Cescau may refer to:

- Cescau, Ariège, a commune in the Ariège department, France
- Cescau, Pyrénées-Atlantiques, a commune in the Pyrénées-Atlantiques department, France
- Patrick Cescau (born 1948), London-based French businessman

== See also ==
- Cesca, a surname
