= Angela Ken =

Filipino singer-songwriter (born 2002)

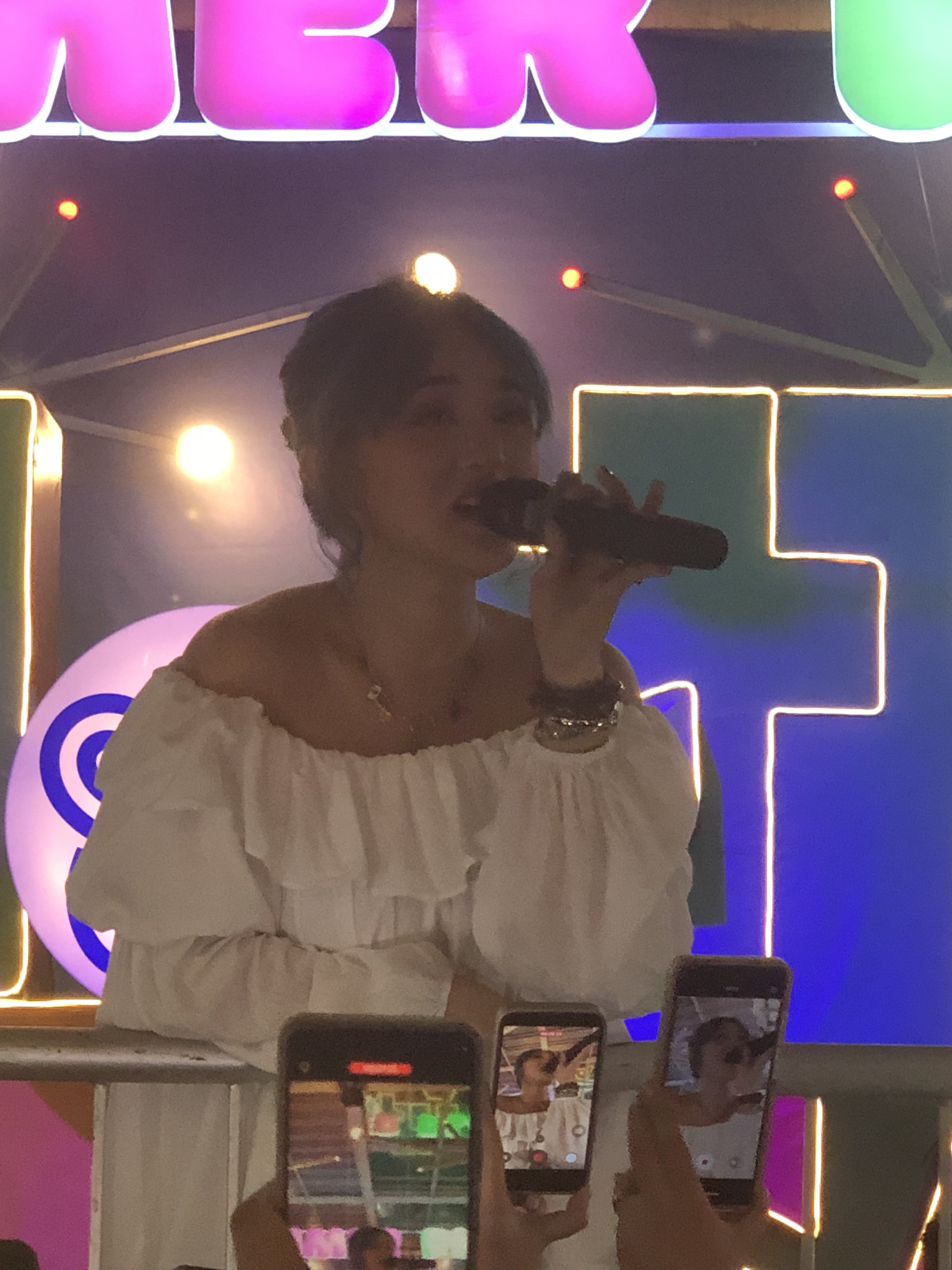
- Angela Ken in 2026
- Born: Angela Ken Tavares Rojas; May 16, 2002 (age 24); Imus, Cavite, Philippines
- Occupations: Actress; singer; songwriter; dancer; influencer
- Years active: 2021–present
- Agent: Star Magic (2021–present)

Angela Ken Tavares Rojas (born May 16, 2002) is a Filipino singer-songwriter, dancer, actress and influencer. She gained acclaim on social networking service TikTok. After releasing her single "Ako Naman Muna", she signed with Star Magic, a talent agency under ABS-CBN Corporation. Angela is also a member of the Squad Plus. In 2022, Angela made her acting debut in the iWantTFC musical series Lyric and Beat as Verlyn.

== Personal life ==
Angela Ken Rojas was born on May 16, 2002. She is from Imus, Cavite and also resides in Las Piñas. She attended Josiah Christian Values High School. She co-owns and operates a cafe in Imus. She was raised by her mother and grandmother and is an engineering student. She is known to keep pet dogs.

She previously studied at Mapúa University where she took up an engineering course. She is currently studying Bachelor of Arts in Communication at Thames International College. (Note: This refers to a school in Quezon City, Philippines, not the Thames International College found in Nepal.)

Since 2019, she has been in a relationship with an individual named Patrick.

== Career ==
=== Beginnings ===
Angela began writing songs at the age of 12, with her first composition being a worship song. She began her professional musical career after being discovered by ABS-CBN Music creative director Jonathan Manalo on TikTok, where she made a draft of what later became her first single "Ako Naman Muna" (Let me first this time) in 2020. The draft gained more than 1.3 million likes on TikTok and led to an invitation by Dreamscape Entertainment to join its music group, The Squad Plus, and another offer by Star Music to produce a full version of the song.

=== 2021 ===
Angela signed a contract with Star Music on March 4. She debuted with "Ako Naman Muna", which reached 2.5 million YouTube views and more than five million Spotify streams. The single was also included in the soundtrack of the television series Huwag Kang Mangamba. An English version of the said song was released on July 23.

She also interpreted "Sila Pa Rin" (Sill Them) for the soundtrack of the television series Marry Me, Marry You.

In December, Angela co-created the soundtrack for the film Saying Goodbye, where she interpreted the single "If We Fall in Love".

=== 2022 ===
Angela released her next single titled "It's Okay Not To Be Okay" on January 14, 2022. It was made in collaboration with Jonathan Manalo and Boy Abunda, and was inspired by a question asked by Abunda during the Binibining Pilipinas 2021 pageant.

In August, Angela was one of the artists who were part of the Beyond The Stars tour as part of Star Magic's 30th anniversary. The artists performed in a US Tour at the Kings Theatre in Brooklyn, New York, The Warfield in San Francisco, and in the Saban Theatre, Beverly Hills in Los Angeles. Prior to the tour, the artists (except SAB) first performed at the Newport Performing Arts Theater in Newport World Resorts. That same month, she was cast in the iWantTFC musical series Lyric and Beat, which marked her acting debut.

In November, Ken released her first album, Angela Ken, which included six previously released songs and two new singles, "Buti Pa Noon" (It's Better Before) and "Payapa Lang" (Just Peaceful). By the end of the year, she had gained 36 million streams.

=== 2023 ===
In 2023, a copy of "Ako Naman Muna" was sent to the Moon as part of the Lunar Codex archive by NASA. In December, she released the single "Alas-Diyes" (Ten o'clock).

=== 2024 ===
At a songwriting camp by ABS-CBN in Davao City, Angela became one of the creators of the Bini single "Shagidi", which was released in 2025.

In February, Angela made her first theater performance as Olive Ostrovsky in the Broadway musical The 25th Annual Putnam County Spelling Bee produced by The Sandbox Collective. In September, she portrayed Ti Moune in the Broadway musical Once On This Island produced by 9 Works Theatrical, alternating with Thea Astley.

In March, Angela collaborated with Maki and Nhiko Sabiniano from the group Nameless Kids to produce the single "Sikulo" (Cycle). In June, she collaborated with Benj Pangilinan for the single "Nandito Na Ako" (I'm Here Now) under Sony Music Entertainment. That same month, she competed in the women's volleyball competition of the Star Magic All Star Games at the Araneta Coliseum.

In October, Angela released two new singles under different labels. The first, "Pansinin Mo Naman Ako" (Pay Attention to Me), was her first single under Inspire Music, while "Kulimlim" (Gloom) was released under Tarsier Records. In November, she was included as a guest performer in Maki's debut concert, titled "Maki-Concert", (Note: lit. 'Join a Concert. Maki being a Tagalog prefix to join an activity') in which she performed "Kulimlim" and "Sikulo".

=== 2025 ===
For the 2025 Philippine general election in May, Angela was cast with other musicians in a rendition of "Ako Ang Simula" (I Am The Beginning), ABS-CBN's election theme song. Later that month, she released her single "Pwede Bang Mamaya" (Can It be Later). In June, she became a guest performer at the official launch of the music video of Maki's single, Kahel na Langit. She competed in the women's volleyball competition of the Star Magic All Star Games held at the Araneta Coliseum on July 20.

On August 29, she was included as a performer for the 11th anniversary concert of Wish 107.5 radio at Eton Centris in Quezon City. On November 7, she was among several guest performers at Maki's Kolorcoaster concert at the Araneta Coliseum.

=== 2026 ===
In February, Angela and Over October released a collaboration single titled "Moved On Last". In March, her single "Baka Bukas" (Maybe Tomorrow) was released, with an accompanying music video featuring her and Aljon Mendoza. Angela released her extended play Panahon (Time) on May 8. It contained six tracks including the previously released singles "Kulimlim", "Pwede Bang Mamaya", and "Baka Bukas".

In July, it was announced that Angela would hold her first headlining concert, subtitled Panahon Na Natin (It's Our Time) at the New Frontier Theater in Quezon City on October 18. Tickets were subsequently sold out. In September, she released a new single, "Tayo Lang", derived from the first song she wrote, in 2019. On October 18, the Panahon Na Natin proceeded under the direction of John Prats, with guest performances by Maki, Adie, and former Imago vocalist Aia de Leon.

== Influences ==
Angela cites Ben&Ben, Moira dela Torre, The Carpenters, Yeng Constantino, Hannah Montana, Niki, Sabrina Carpenter and Imago as musical influences.

== Concerts ==
=== Headlining tours ===
List of headlining concert tours, showing dates, associated albums, locations, and number of shows
Title	Date	Countries	Shows	Ref.
Panahon EP Busking Tour	May 8–20, 2026	Philippines	6	

=== Headlining concerts ===
List of headlining concerts, showing dates, locations, and venues
Title	Date(s)	City	Country	Venue	Ref.
Panahon Na Natin	October 18, 2026	Quezon City	Philippines	New Frontier Theater	

=== Joint concerts and tours ===
List of special performances and appearances, showing dates, locations, and venues
Title	Date(s)	City	Country	Venue	Ref.
Star Magic 30: Beyond The Stars with various Star Magic artists	July 23 – August 14, 2022	Pasay; New York City; San Francisco; Beverly Hills (Note: Promoted as Los Angeles)	Philippines; United States	Newport Performing Arts Theater; Kings Theatre; Warfield Theatrel; Saban Theatre	

=== Music festivals ===
List of music festival performances, showing dates, locations, and venues
Title	Date(s)	City	Country	Venue	Ref.
South by Southwest Sydney	October 15–17, 2025	Sydney	Australia		
One Zone Fest	October 24–25, 2026	Quezon City	Philippines	Araneta Coliseum	

=== Guest appearances ===
List of special performances and appearances, showing dates, locations, and venues
Title	Date(s)	City	Country	Venue	Ref.
Maki-Concert	November 30, 2025	Quezon City	Philippines	New Frontier Theater	
"Kahel na Langit" music video launch (with Maki)	June 14, 2025	Pasay	Philippines	SM Mall of Asia Sky Amphiteater	
Wish Anniversary	August 29, 2025	Quezon City	Philippines	Eton Centris	
Pawchella	October 18, 2025	Taguig	Philippines	Venice Grand Canal Mall	
Kolorcoaster (with Maki)	November 7, 2025	Quezon City	Philippines	Araneta Coliseum	
Beyond Beats	November 15, 2025	Quezon City	Philippines	Eton Centris	
Biyaheng Bente (with Yeng Constantino)	August 29-30, 2026	Quezon City	Philippines	Araneta Coliseum	

== Discography ==
Albums
Title	Album details	Sales	Certifications	Ref.
Angela Ken	Released: November 4, 2022; Label: Star Music; Formats: streaming	—	—	

EPsList of extended plays with selected details
Title	Album details	Ref.
Panahon	Released: May 8, 2026; Label: Tarsier Records; Format: Digital download, streaming	

Singles
Year	Title	Label	Refs.
2021	"Ako Naman Muna"	Star Music	
2021	"Ako Naman Muna (English Version)"	Star Music	
2021	"Sila Pa Rin" (soundtrack from Marry Me, Marry You)	Star Music	
2021	"Kontrol" (soundtrack from Click, Like, Share)	Star Music	
2021	"If We Fall In Love" (soundtrack from Saying Goodbye)	Star Music	
2022	"Akala Maling Akala" (soundtrack from 2 Good 2 Be True)	Star Music	
2023	"Alas Diyes"	Star Music	
2024	"Ikaw Sana Siya" (soundtrack from What's Wrong with Secretary Kim)	Star Music	
2024	"Pansinin Mo Naman Ako"	Star Music	
2024	"Kulimlim"	Tarsier Records	
2025	"Pwede Bang Mamaya"	Tarsier Records	
2025	"Kathang Isip" (with Ben&Ben) (soundtrack from It's Okay to Not Be Okay)	Star Music	
2026	"Moved on Last" (with Over October)	Tarsier Records	
2026	"Paano Kung Tayo Na Lang? (soundtrack from The Secrets of Hotel 88)	Star Music	
2026	"Baka Bukas"	Tarsier Records	
2026	"Tayo Lang"	Tarsier Records	

=== Collaborations ===
List of collaboration singles, showing associated albums
Title	Year	Album/EP	Ref.
"Sabay Natin" (with Jeremy Glinoga)	2022	Love in 40 Days (Official Soundtrack)	
"Your Everything" (with Jeremy Glinoga)	2022	How To Move On in 30 Days (Official Soundtrack)	
"Sikulo" (with Maki and Nhiko)	2024	Non-album singles	
"Nandito Na Ako" (with Benj Pangilinan)	2024	Non-album singles	
"Ako Ang Simula" (with various artists)	2025	Non-album singles	
"Moved on Last" (with Over October)	2026	Non-album singles	
"Panahon" (with Jan Roberts)	2026	Panahon	

=== Songwriting credits ===
List of singles, showing year released and associated albums
Title	Year	Artist	Album	Composer	Lyricist
"Don't Be Afraid"	2021	Anji Salvacion and KD Estrada	My Sunset Girl (Original Soundtrack)	Yes	Yes
"Shagidi"	2025	Bini	Flames	Yes	Yes
"Talon"	2025	Angia	None	Yes	Yes

=== Soundtrack appearances ===
List of soundtrack appearances
Year	Film/series/program	Song(s)	Ref.
2025	Love You So Bad	"Sikulo" (with Maki and Nhiko)	
2026	Someone, Someday	"Kulimlim"	

== Filmography ==
=== Music videos ===
Title	Year	Director(s)	Ref.
"Ako Naman Muna"	2021	Amiel Kirby Balagtas	
"It's Okay Not To Be Okay"	2022	Miko Pelino	
"Dagdag Na Alaala"	2022	Jasper Salimbangon	
"Payapa Lang"	2022	Raymark King Bingcang	
"Buti Pa Noon"	2022	Raymark King Bingcang	
"Dambana"	2023	Raymark King Bingcang	
"Alas Diyes"	2023	Kashka Gaddi	
"Sikulo"	2024	Ingrid Ignacio	
"Ikaw Sana Siya"	2024	Riel Mandapat	
"Nandito Na Ako"	2024	Julia Arenas	
"Kulimlim"	2024	Ingrid Ignacio	
"Kulimlim" (Lyric Video)	2024		
"Bawat Daan" (Cover) - Studio Version	2025		
"Pwede Bang Mamaya" (Lyric Video)	2025		
"Pwede Bang Mamaya"	2025	Ingrid Ignacio	
"Ako Ang Simula" (with various artists)	2025	Richmond Cadsawan	
"Baka Bukas"	2026	Ingrid Ignacio-Termulo	
"Baka Bukas" (Lyric Video)	2026		
"Moved On Last" (with Over October)	2026	Kashka Gaddi	
"Tayo Lang"	2026	Ingrid Ignacio-Termulo; Bryan Emanuel Termulo	

=== Television/Digital ===
Year	Title	Role	Ref.
2021–present	ASAP	Herself (performer)	
2022	Lyric and Beat	Verlyn	
2024–present	It's Showtime	Herself (performer)	
2025	Rainbow Rumble	Herself (contestant)	

=== Theater ===
Year	Title	Role	Producer	Ref.
2024	The 25th Annual Putnam County Spelling Bee	Olive Ostrovsky	The Sandbox Collective	
2024	Once On This Island	Ti Moune	9 Works Theatrical	
2026	The Notebook			

== Accolades ==
Award	Year	Category	Recipient(s)	Result	Ref.
Awit Awards	2022	Best Inspirational Recording	"Ako Naman Muna"	Won	
Awit Awards	2026	Best Inspirational Recording	"Pwede Bang Mamaya?"	Nominated	
Awit Awards	2026	Best Traditional/Contemporary Folk Recording	"Pwede Bang Mamaya?"	Nominated	
Catholic Mass Media Awards	2022	Best Secular Song	"It's Okay Not To Be Okay"	Won	
Filipino Music Awards	2026	Folk Song of the Year	"Baka Bukas"	Nominated	
Jupiter Music Awards	2025	Collaboration of the Year	"Sikulo" (with Maki and Nhiko)	Nominated	
PMPC Star Awards for Music	2024	Female Acoustic Artist of the Year	"Ako Naman Muna"	Won	
PMPC Star Awards for Music	2026	Female Acoustic Artist of the Year	"Kulimlim"	Won	
PMPC Star Awards for Music	2026	Collaboration of the Year	"Sikulo" (with Maki and Nhiko)	Nominated	
TikTok Awards	2021	Rising Star Award	Angela Ken	Nominated	
Wish Music Awards	2025	Wishclusive Collaboration of the Year	"Sikulo" (with Maki and Nhiko)	Nominated	
Wish Music Awards	2026	Wishclusive Contemporary Folk Performance of the Year	"Kulimlim"	Nominated	
Wish Music Awards	2026	Wishclusive Contemporary Folk Song of the Year	"Pwede Bang Mamaya"	Nominated	
