= Cesca =

Cesca is an Italian surname. Notable people with the surname include:

- Alessandro Cesca (born 1980), Italian footballer
- Bob Cesca (born 1971), American director, producer, writer, actor, blogger, and political commentator

== See also ==
- Cescau (disambiguation)
- Cesca chair
