= Joan (band) =

Musical group from Little Rock, Arkansas

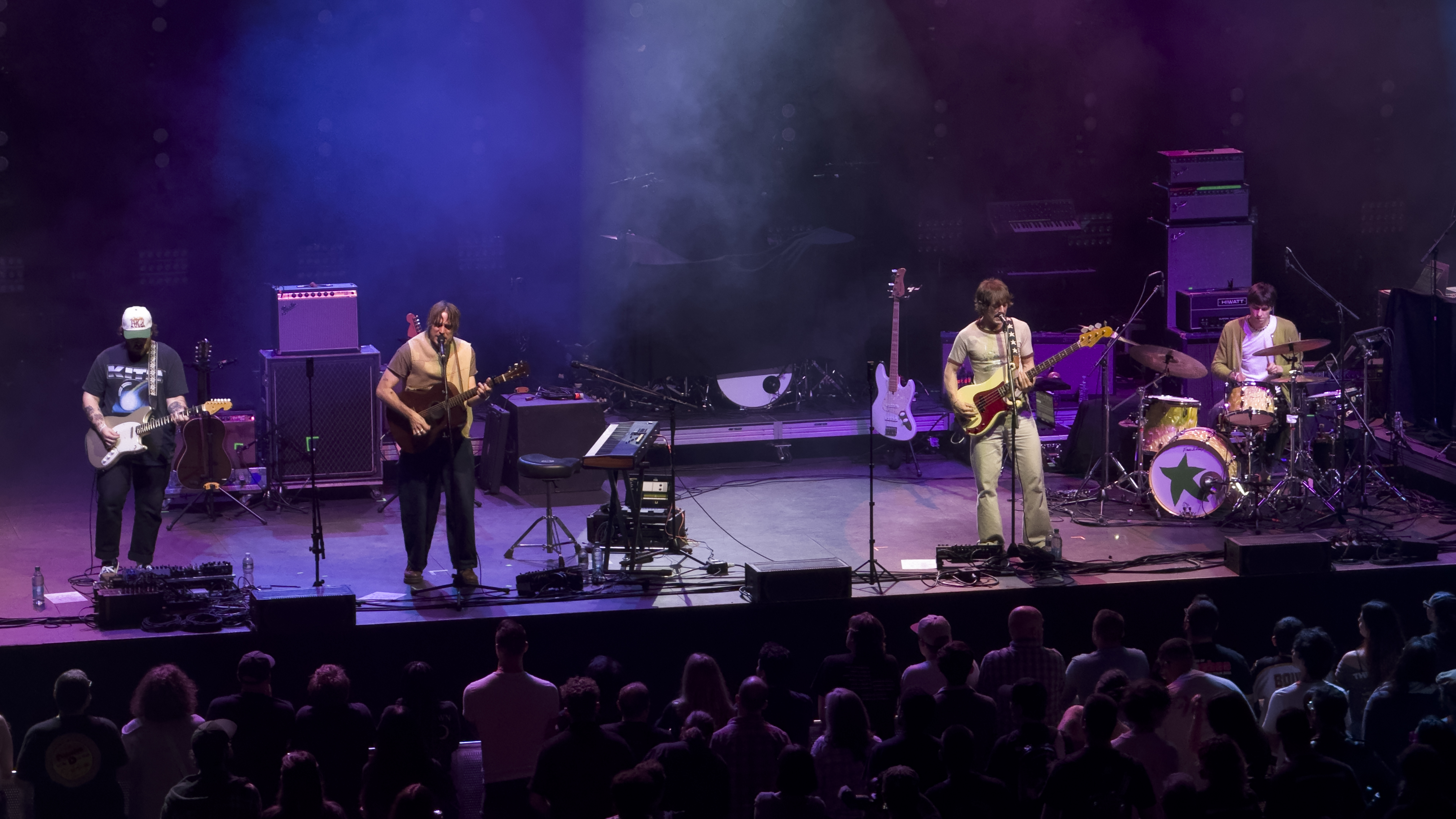
- Joan performing in 2025

Background information
- Origin: Little Rock, Arkansas, U.S.
- Genres: Indie pop
- Years active: 2017–present
- Label: Photo Finish Records
- Members: Alan Benjamin Thomas; Steven Rutherford
- Website: songsbyjoan.com

Joan (stylized as joan) is an American duo from Little Rock, Arkansas, consisting of Alan Benjamin Thomas and Steven Rutherford.

== History ==
The duo formed in 2017. The band name was inspired by the fact that both band members had a grandmother whose name was Joan. The duo released their first EP in 2019, titled portra. The duo released their second EP in 2020 titled cloudy. In May 2021, the duo released a new song titled "so good" as well as plans to release two EPs the same year. The two EPs, hi and bye, were released in late 2021. In April 2023, they released their debut album, superglue.

The duo toured with Bloc Party during 2025, performing as the opener during the band's tour while in the US.

== Discography ==
=== Studio albums ===
Title	Details
superglue	Release date: April 19, 2023; Label: Photo Finish Records
this won't last forever	Release date: September 25, 2025; Label: Photo Finish Records

=== Extended plays ===
Title	Details
portra	Release date: July 11, 2018; Label: self-published
cloudy	Release date: August 6, 2020; Label: Photo Finish Records
hi	Release date: November 11, 2021; Label: Photo Finish Records
bye	Release date: December 2, 2021; Label: Photo Finish Records

=== Collaborations ===
List of collaboration singles, showing associated albums
Title	Year	Album	Ref.
"Turning Green" (with Maki)	2025	Kolorcoaster	
