= Kolorcoaster =

Studio album by Maki
- Released: September 19, 2025
- Recorded: 2024
- Genres: Indie alternative; EDM; hip hop; R&B; disco
- Length: 31:35
- Languages: Filipino; English
- Label: Tarsier

Singles from Kolorcoaster
- 1. "Dilaw" Released: May 24, 2024; 2. "Namumula" Released: August 30, 2024; 3. "Bughaw" Released: December 1, 2024; 4. "Kahel na Langit" Released: June 13, 2025

Kolorcoaster (stylized in all caps) is the debut studio album by Filipino singer and songwriter Maki. It was released by Tarsier Records on September 19, 2025. The album contains 10 tracks, of which four ("Dilaw", "Namumula", "Bughaw" and "Kahel na Langit") were previously released as stand-alone singles in 2024 and 2025. The album spawned a namesake concert tour by Maki featuring its component singles beginning in November 2025.

== Background ==
Maki gained widespread recognition in 2024 with the release of his song "Dilaw" (Yellow) on May 24. The song topped local Spotify and Billboard charts and even made its way onto the global Spotify chart. It became the third OPM song in history to achieve this, following Juan Karlos' "Ere" and gins&melodies' "Babaero" featuring Hev Abi. The school-themed music video for "Dilaw" featured Bini member Maloi Ricalde. Maki shared that the song had been in his vault since August 2023, waiting for the right moment to be released. On August 30, Maki released a single titled "Namumula" (Blush).

On November 29 and 30, 2024, Maki held his first solo concert, titled "Maki-Concert", (Note: lit. 'Join a Concert. Maki being a Tagalog prefix to join an activity') at the New Frontier Theater in Quezon City, during which he performed one of his upcoming songs, "Bughaw" (Blue), and performed parts of another upcoming single, "Itim Na Ulap" (Black Cloud). "Bughaw" was released on December 1, 2024.

== Release ==
During the launch of the music video for "Bughaw" on March 12, 2025, Maki said that "Dilaw", "Namumula" and "Bughaw" belonged to a trilogy of color-inspired love songs created as part of his upcoming first full-length album, titled Kolorcoaster. He also announced that the album would include a slowed-down version of "Dilaw". A component single, "Kahel na Langit" (Orange Sky), was released in June 2025.

While performing at the Alagang Suki Fest 2025 concert at the Araneta Coliseum on July 31, 2025, Maki announced that Kolorcoaster would be released on September 19, 2025, and would consist of 10 songs about colors. At the same time, the album's cover art was released on Instagram showing a colorful circle with a star. The album is to be released under Tarsier Records.

On August 17, 2025, Maki announced that he would hold another concert, also titled with the same name, at the Araneta Coliseum on November 7, 2025, with him as one of its musical directors. An overseas concert tour under the same name was also announced for later in November, with stops in the United Arab Emirates and Qatar and with Yeng Constantino as a guest performer. A repeat concert, subtitled "One More Ride", was held on February 21, 2026 at the Araneta Coliseum. Another overseas leg was announced for later in June, with stops in Singapore and Jakarta, Indonesia.

The album was released on September 19, 2025, with Maki saying that work had been underway on the project since 2023. A party to celebrate its release was held by Maki for fans at an amusement park in Pasay on September 30. A physical copy of the album was released in CD format through the ABS-CBN online store alongside Maki-related merchandise.

On November 7, 2025, a new version of the component single "Turning Green" was released, featuring a collaboration with the American music duo Joan. Later that day, the Kolorcoaster concert proceeded with performances of the namesake album's component singles and guest performances by Maki's siblings Haro and Clare, Jolianne, Yeng Constantino, Angela Ken, and Maloi.

In 2026, Maki released a new version of Kolorcoaster featuring live performances of its component tracks.

At his contract renewal with ABS-CBN Music in November 2026, Maki announced a series of extensions of his Kolorcoaster concert, including a main show subtitled "One Last Ride", an international leg with stops in New Zealand, Australia, the United States and Canada, an EP called Kolorcoaster Shades, and a deluxe album called Kolorcoaster Hue.

== Track listing ==
Kolorcoaster track listing
No.	Title	Writer(s)	Producer(s)	Length
1.	"Namumula"	Ralph William Datoon; Viktor Nhiko Sabiniano	Viktor Nhiko Sabiniano	2:54
2.	"Kahel na Langit"	Ralph William Datoon	Maki; Tati de Mesa; Jacob Clemente; Shadiel Chan	3:36
3.	"Dilaw"	Ralph William Datoon; Viktor Nhiko Sabiniano	Viktor Nhiko Sabiniano	3:12
4.	"Turning Green"	Ralph William Datoon	Jovel Rivera; Shadiel Chan	1:38
5.	"Bughaw"	Ralph William Datoon; Viktor Nhiko Sabiniano	Viktor Nhiko Sabiniano	3:53
6.	"Indigo (with u)"	Ralph William Datoon	Jovel Rivera; Shadiel Chan	2:46
7.	"Nangungulila"	Ralph William Datoon	Jovel Rivera; Shadiel Chan	3:33
8.	"Itim na Ulap"	Ralph William Datoon	Shadiel Chan	4:16
9.	"Abelyana"	Ralph William Datoon	Shadiel Chan	3:17
10.	"ROYGBIV"	Ralph William Datoon	Jovel Rivera; Shadiel Chan	2:26
Total length:				31:35

== Awards and nominations ==
Award	Year (Note: Indicates the year of the ceremony. Each year is linked to the article about the awards held that year, wherever possible.)	Category	Recipient(s)	Result	Ref.
Aliw Awards	2025	Best Male Artist in a Major Concert	Maki	Won	
Aliw Awards	2025	Best Director for a Major Concert	Maki (with Star Music Events)	Won	
Awit Awards	2026	Album of the Year	Kolorcoaster	Nominated	
Awit Awards	2026	Best Cover Art	Kolorcoaster	Nominated	
Filipino Music Awards	2026	Album of the Year	Kolorcoaster	Won	
P-pop Music Awards	2025	Album of the Year	Kolorcoaster	Nominated	
VP Choice Awards	2026	Solo Performer of the Year	Maki	Nominated	

== Listicles ==
Name of publisher, year listed, name of listicle, and placement
Publisher	Year	Listicle	Placement	Ref.
Billboard Philippines	2025	Favorite Albums of 2025	Placed	
Billboard Philippines	2025	25 Best Filipino Albums and EPs of 2025	Placed	
Manila Bulletin	2025	Favorite OPM albums of 2025	Placed	
