= Thames International College =

- Old Baneshwor, Kathmandu; Nepal

Information
- Type: Tribhuvan university affiliated college
- Website: thamescollege.edu.np

Thames International College, is an academic institution located in Surya Bikram Gyawali Mard, Old Baneswor, Kathmandu, Nepal. The school offers a variety of undergraduate programs that leads to a degree from Tribhuvan University.

== Organization and administration ==
=== Affiliations ===
All the programs at Thames are affiliated with Tribhuvan University. Established in 1959, Tribhuvan University is the oldest university in Nepal.

=== Partnerships ===
Thames International College has signed an articulation agreement with Webster University in St. Louis, Missouri.

== Programs ==
- Bachelor of Arts - Social Work and Rural Development
- Bachelor of Business Administration
- Bachelor of Business Studies
- Bachelor of Information Management
- Bachelor of Journalism, Mass Communication and English

== Student life ==
=== Office of Student Affairs ===
The Office of Student Affairs works with all aspects of students’ lives at Thames and collaborates with students, staff members, faculty, alumni, parents and other agencies to support the students.

=== Student organizations ===
- Student Council of Thames International College
- Rotaract Club of Thames International College
- The Management Club
- Information Technology Club
- Social Work Club of Thames

Interest Based Clubs:

- Dance
- Music
- Theater
- Emcee
- Sports, and more
