= Kahel na Langit =

Single by Maki

from the album Kolorcoaster
- Language: Filipino
- English title: Orange Sky
- Released: June 13, 2025
- Length: 3:36
- Label: Tarsier
- Songwriter: Ralph William Datoon
- Producers: Maki; Tati de Mesa; Jacob Clemente; Shadiel Chan

Maki singles chronology
"Bughaw" (2024)	"Kahel na Langit" (2025)

Music video
- "Kahel na Langit" on YouTube

"Kahel na Langit" (stylized in all lowercase; transl. Orange Sky), is a song by Filipino singer Maki. It was released as a digital pre-single for his debut album, Kolorcoaster, on June 13, 2025, through Tarsier Records. It was written by Ralph William Datoon, and produced by Maki, Tati de Mesa, Jacob Clemente, and Shadiel Chan. The track expresses feelings of longing and missing someone who once offered comfort during difficult times. The music video was directed by Ingrid Ignacio and Maki himself. It features Maki and the Zushibois, which Maki praised them for their warmth during tours.

Following its release, the track entered the two Billboard Philippines charts. It peaked at number 12 and number 4 on the Philippines Hot 100 and Top Philippine Songs, respectively.

== Background and release ==
After releasing his single "Bughaw" in 2024, Maki announced his debut album, Kolorcoaster, during the song's music video premiere in March 2025.

In May, he revealed his next single, "Kahel na Langit", which was released on June 13, 2025. An accompanying music video was released on June 14, 2025, at the SM Mall of Asia Sky Amphitheater.

== Composition and lyrics ==
"Kahel na Langit"
A 24-second sample of "Kahel na Langit", where the chorus can be heard.

"Kahel na Langit" is three minutes and thirty-six seconds long, set in the key of F, with a tempo of 94 beats per minute. The song was composed by Ralph William Datoon, and produced by Maki, Tati de Mesa, Jacob Clemente, and Shadiel Chan. The song was arranged by Ralph William Datoon, Tati de Mesa, Jon Lopez, Sammy Icaracon, and Ian Moscare, while Tati de Mesa provided the electric guitar, Jacob Clemente for synthesizer, Jon Lopez for drums, Sammy Icaracon for electric guitar, and Ian Moscare for bass guitar.

According to Maki, the song expresses feelings of longing and missing someone who once offered comfort during difficult times, adding that he conceived of the song during a period where he had no romantic partner to confide in with his problems.During the music video premiere, he described it as dedicated to those who struggle with being alone. He also explained that sunsets inspired the track's imagery, representing endings that can still feel warm and beautiful like kahel (lit. 'orange').

Unlike his previous releases associated with other colors, "Kahel na Langit" explores a different emotional landscape. The track's poetic lyrics, such as "Hanggang may kahel na langit, maiisip kita", (transl. As long as there is an orange sky, I will think of you.) effectively convey the timeless love that endures.

== Music video ==
The music video was directed by Ingrid Ignacio and Maki. It was noted for its strong visual storytelling, but intentionally leaves much of it open for interpretation, allowing listeners to find their own meaning without explanation. Maki revealed the personal touches in the visuals, including a handcrafted shirt worn by him and the production team in the music video. He described it as worn and torn, yet comforting, resembling the hearts the song aims to soothe. Maki praised his creative circle, Zushibois, for their warmth during tours and their inclusion in the music video.

== Reception ==
=== Reviews ===
Writing for Rolling Stone Philippines, Elijah Pareño highlighted that Maki's newest single showcased a different side of him. He also highlighted the visual shift, accompanied by heavenly production and Maki's "soaring vocal performance". Elijah suggests that "kahel na langit" shifts from yellow's brightness to orange's warmer tone, resulting in a more personal and expansive feeling.

=== Commercial performance ===
Following its release on June 13, 2025, "Kahel na Langit" debuted two weeks later at number 13 on Top Philippine Songs chart and number 20 on Philippines Hot 100 on Billboard Philippines. The song also became the biggest streaming debut in 2025 for an OPM song on Spotify Philippines with 206.5 thousand streams.

On July 19, the track peaked at number 12 on Philippines Hot 100 and number 4 on Top Philippine Songs on Billboard Philippines. On the 33rd week, it peaked at number eleven at the Official Philippines Chart.

In December, "Kahel na Langit" was recognized by Apple Music Philippines among its Top OPM Songs of 2025, placing eighth.

== Credits and personnel ==
Credits are adapted from Apple Music.

- Maki — vocals, producer
- Ralph William Datoon — songwriter, lead vocals, backing vocals
- Tati de Mesa — producer, electric guitar, arranger
- Jacob Clemente — producer, synthesizer, post production engineer
- Shadiel Chan — producer, mixing engineer, recording engineer
- Jan Fuertez — mastering engineer
- Sammy Icaranom — electric guitar, arranger
- Jon Lopez — drums, arranger
- Ian Moscare — bass guitar, arranger

== Charts ==
=== Weekly charts ===
Weekly chart performance
Chart (2025)	Peak position
Philippines (IFPI)	10
Philippines Hot 100 (Billboard Philippines)	10
Philippines Top Songs (Billboard Philippines)	4

=== Year-end charts ===
Year-end chart performance
Chart (2025)	Position
Philippines Hot 100 (Billboard Philippines)	56
Philippines Top Songs (Billboard Philippines)	20

== Accolades ==
Award	Year	Category	Result	Ref.
Awit Awards	2026	Best Alternative Recording	Pending	
Awit Awards	2026	Best Music Video	Pending	
Awit Awards	2026	Best Performance by a Solo Artist	Pending	
Awit Awards	2026	Song of the Year	Pending	
VP Choice Awards	2026	OPM Song of the Year	Nominated	
Wish Music Awards	2026	Wishclusive Pop Performance of the Year	Nominated	

== Listicles ==
Publisher	Year	Listicle	Placement	Ref.
Billboard Philippines	2025	10 OPM Songs for Reflection and New Beginnings	Placed	
Billboard Philippines	2025	Favorite Songs Of 2025	Placed	
