= Maki (singer) =

Filipino singer (born 1999)

- Maki in 2026

Background information
- Born: Ralph William Datoon; November 27, 1999 (age 26); Quezon City, Philippines
- Genres: Alternative R&B; pop
- Occupations: Singer; songwriter
- Years active: 2021–present
- Label: Tarsier

Ralph William Datoon (born November 27, 1999), professionally known as Maki, is a Filipino singer and songwriter from Quezon City. He first gained attention with his viral songs "Saan?" and "Bakit?" from his debut extended play (EP) Tanong, released on September 22, 2023, both of which saw significant success on Spotify. In 2021, he was signed to Tarsier Records.

In 2024, Maki reached mainstream popularity with his single "Dilaw", which charted on the global Spotify chart, making it the third Filipino song to do so. The song also became the first number-one track on Billboard Philippines' relaunched Philippines Hot 100 chart.

== Life and career ==
=== 1999–2017: Early life and The Voice Teens ===
Ralph William Datoon was born in Quezon City, and is the sixth of seven siblings. He began writing R&B songs during his high school years and independently auditioned at various recording companies. He completed a bachelor's degree in communications at New Era University.

Datoon initially posted videos of himself singing on social media, and in 2017, he auditioned for the first season of the reality TV singing competition The Voice Teens but was rejected. As he was about to graduate from college, he planned to step back from his musical career.

=== 2021–2024: Tarsier Records, Tanong and breakthrough with "Dilaw" ===
In 2021, a friend discovered a demo tape he had recorded, which eventually reached an A&R representative at Tarsier Records and caught the label's attention. The label signed him, and he adopted the stage name Maki, without providing a reason for this choice. He then began appearing on TV shows such as It's Showtime. His debut single, "Halaga", was released on December 17, 2021.

In 2023, Maki released "Saan?", dedicated to people struggling to express feelings of separation anxiety. He initially teased the song on TikTok by posting a series of snippets, which went viral and garnered over 500,000 views. Maki released his debut EP, Tanong, on September 22, 2023, which featured the tracks "Saan?" and "Bakit?" He described the songs as questions directed at people who were no longer in his life, missed opportunities, and reflections on himself.

He gained widespread recognition in 2024 with the song "Dilaw", which topped local Spotify and Billboard charts and eventually made its way onto the global Spotify chart. It became the third Filipino song in history to achieve this, following Juan Karlos' "Ere" and gins&melodies' "Babaero", featuring Hev Abi. The school-themed music video for "Dilaw" included Bini member Maloi Ricalde. Maki shared that the song had been in his vault since August 2023, waiting for the right moment to be released.

On August 2, 2024, Tarsier Records announced that Maki would be holding his first solo concert, at the New Frontier Theater in Quezon City, in November. Titled Maki-Concert, (Note: lit. 'join a concert; maki being a Tagalog prefix to join an activity') the performance was extended to two days, after tickets for the first day sold out within four hours of release. The tickets for the second day also sold out. On August 30, he issued the single "Namumula". On October 12, he appeared as a guest performer at a concert by the American pop rock group LANY at the Philippine Arena in Bulacan. On November 25, Tarsier Records announced the inclusion of Johnoy Danao, Ebe Dancel, Angela Ken, Cesca, Sitti, and Nameless Kids as guest performers at the concert. A new song, "Bughaw", was released on December 1. A regional tour was also held in Cebu City, Baguio, and Cagayan de Oro in February and May 2025.

In December, "Dilaw" was recognized as the No. 4 music video of 2024 on YouTube in the Philippines. It was also named Spotify's No. 2 song in the Philippines for 2024 and Google's tenth most-searched song in the country that year.

=== 2025–present: Kolorcoaster ===
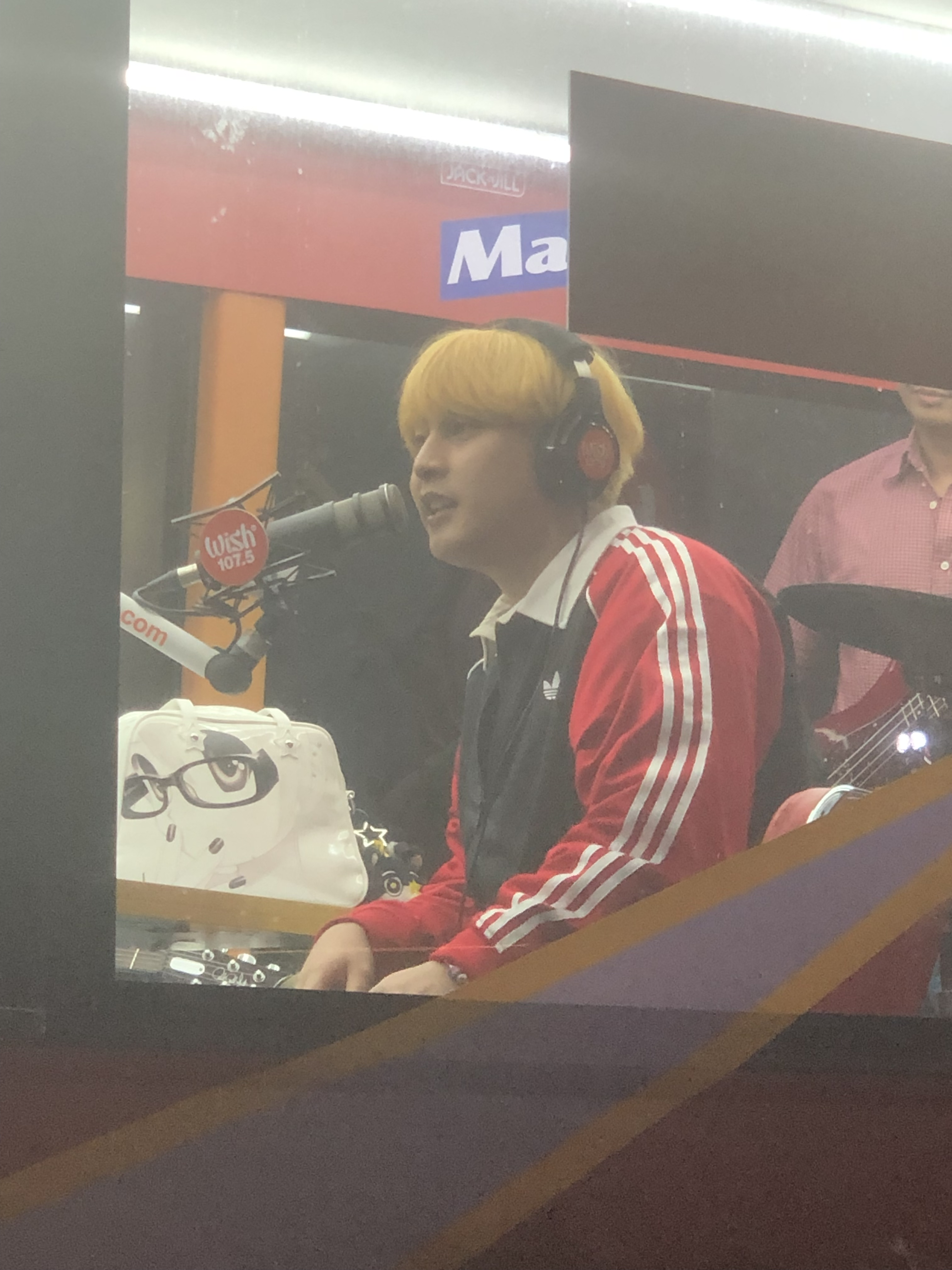
Maki performing at the Wish 107.5 Bus in March 2026

In January 2025, Maki was announced as a guest performer in the Biniverse World Tour 2025 concert by Bini at the Philippine Arena in Bulacan on February 15. He was also a guest performer at Cup of Joe's Silakbo concert, on February 8 and 9, at the Araneta Coliseum in Quezon City. On February 17, Aurora Music Festival announced that Maki would perform on the second day of the event's 2025 iteration, which was held on May 3 and 4 in Clark Global City, Pampanga. He also joined Silent Sanctuary in a joint tour of the United States on June and July 2025, organized by US-based promotions and production company Toggleswitch, with stops in Seattle, San Francisco, Las Vegas, Los Angeles, New York City, and Fairfax, Virginia. Another joint tour, this time with James Reid, was held in Canada in July 2025, with stops in Winnipeg, Toronto, Calgary, and Edmonton.

At the inauguration of the Official Philippines Chart on February 19, Maki was recognized as its Top 8 Local Artist of the Year, while "Dilaw" was named the Top 2 Local Song of the Year. In March, Maki announced that "Dilaw", "Namumula", and "Bughaw" were part of his upcoming debut full-length album, titled Kolorcoaster. A new single, "Kahel na Langit", was released in June. For the 2025 Philippine general election in May, Maki was cast with other musicians in a rendition of "Ako Ang Simula", ABS-CBN's election theme song.

While performing at the Alagang Suki Fest 2025 concert at the Araneta Coliseum on July 31, Maki announced that Kolorcoaster would come out on September 19, 2025. In August, he stated that he would hold another concert, also titled Kolorcoaster, at the Araneta Coliseum, on November 7, 2025, in which he would also serve as a musical director. An overseas concert tour under the same name was also announced for later in November, with stops in the United Arab Emirates and Qatar and with Yeng Constantino as a guest performer.

On November 7, the same day as his scheduled concert at the Araneta Coliseum, which included guest performances by his siblings Haro and Clare as well as Jolianne, Yeng Constantino, Angela Ken, and Maloi, a new version of the single "Turning Green" was released, featuring a collaboration with the American music duo Joan. In December, Tarsier Records announced a repeat of the Kolorcoaster concert, subtitled "One More Ride", which was held on February 21, 2026, once more at the Araneta Coliseum. Later in December, Maki was included among Billboard Philippines' list of leading artists of 2025, ranking in tenth place. Three of his songs, "Dilaw", "Kahel na Langit", and "Namumula", were recognized by Apple Music Philippines among its Top OPM Songs of 2025, placing third, eighth, and ninth, respectively.

Following the "One More Ride" concert, another international Kolorcoaster leg was announced for later in June, with stops in Singapore and Jakarta, Indonesia. In May 2026, a new single, "Habangbuhay Pansamantala", was released. It was followed in July with "Luck", a collaboration single with James Reid.

On September 12, Maki was among the lead performers at the opening ceremony of UAAP Season 89 at the SM Mall of Asia Arena. On November 10, Maki renewed his contract with ABS-CBN Music announced a series of extensions of his Kolorcoaster concert, including a main show subtitled "One Last Ride", an international leg with stops in New Zealand, Australia, the United States and Canada, an EP called Kolorcoaster Shades, and a deluxe album called Kolorcoaster Hue.

== Political and social views ==
During the September 2025 Philippine protests, Maki made a brief statement against corruption while performing at the San Miguel Oktoberfest at the Okada Manila, stating, "...I am a Filipino first and foremost. Let's put an end to corruption! There must be accountability. People must be jailed".

On November 30, 2025, Maki joined the second edition of the Trillion Peso March against corruption at the People Power Monument in Quezon City, in which he performed a modified version of "Namumula". Later that day, he expressed support for the normalization of sex education during a celebration of World AIDS Day at the University of the Philippines Diliman.

== Musical styles and influences ==
Maki's music has been described as alternative pop and alternative R&B, with his work incorporating elements of indie pop and R&B. He has described his songwriting as "authentic and personal".

Maki has cited musical influences such as Mariah Carey, the 1975, Michael Buble, Beabadoobee, Harry Styles, Ariana Grande, and Taylor Swift.

== Discography ==
Studio albums

- Kolorcoaster (2025)

EPs

- Tanong (2023)

== Filmography ==
=== Film ===
Year	Title	Director(s)	Ref.
2023	Tanong	Kashka Gaddi	

=== Television ===
Year	Title	Ref.
2024	Tao Po!	
2024	ASAP	
2025	It's Showtime	
2025	ASAP	
2025	Fast Talk with Boy Abunda	
2025	Rainbow Rumble	
2026	Everybody, Sing!	
2026	Lapor Pak!	
2026	Drag Race Philippines	
2026	Gandang Gabi Vice	

== Accolades ==
Award	Year	Category	Recipient(s)	Result	Ref.
Aliw Awards	2025	Best Male Artist in a Major Concert	Maki (Kolorcoaster)	Won	
Aliw Awards	2025	Best Director for a Major Concert	Maki (Kolorcoaster, with Star Music Events)	Won	
ALTA Media Icon Awards	2025	Best Male Recording Artist	Maki	Won	
Awit Awards	2024	Song of the Year	"Saan?"	Nominated	
Awit Awards	2024	Best Pop Recording	"Saan?"	Nominated	
Awit Awards	2025	Best Pop Recording	"Dilaw"	Won	
Awit Awards	2025	Music Video of the Year	"Namumula"	Nominated	
Awit Awards	2026	Album of the Year	Kolorcoaster	Nominated	
Awit Awards	2026	Best Cover Art	Kolorcoaster	Nominated	
Awit Awards	2026	Best Alternative Recording	"Kahel na Langit"	Nominated	
Awit Awards	2026	Best Music Video	"Kahel na Langit"	Nominated	
Awit Awards	2026	Best Performance by a Solo Artist	"Kahel na Langit"	Nominated	
Awit Awards	2026	Song of the Year	"Kahel na Langit"	Nominated	
BreakTudo Awards	2025	Asian Artist of the Year	Maki	Nominated	
Filipino Music Awards	2025	People's Choice Awards: Artist	Maki	Nominated	
Filipino Music Awards	2025	People's Choice Awards: Song	"Namumula"	Nominated	
Filipino Music Awards	2025	Pop Song of the Year	"Namumula"	Nominated	
Filipino Music Awards	2026	People's Choice Awards: Artist	Maki	Nominated	
Filipino Music Awards	2026	Artist of the Year	Maki	Nominated	
Filipino Music Awards	2026	Album of the Year	Kolorcoaster	Won	
Filipino Music Awards	2026	People's Choice Awards: Song	"Habangbuhay Pansamantala"	Nominated	
Filipino Music Awards	2026	Pop Song of the Year	"Habangbuhay Pansamantala"	Nominated	
Jupiter Music Awards	2025	Male Artist of the Year	"Dilaw"	Nominated	
Jupiter Music Awards	2025	Song of the Year	"Dilaw"	Nominated	
Jupiter Music Awards	2025	Music Video of the Year	"Dilaw"	Nominated	
Jupiter Music Awards	2025	Collaboration of the Year	"Sikulo" (with Angela Ken and Nhiko)	Nominated	
Monster RX 93.1 Music Awards	2025	OPM Song of the Year	"Dilaw"	Won	
Monster RX 93.1 Music Awards	2025	OPM Breakthrough Artist of the Year	Maki	Won	
Music Awards Japan	2025	Best of Listeners' Choice: International Song	"Dilaw"	Nominated	
Music Rank Asian Choice Awards	2025	Asian Artist of the Year	Maki	Won	
Myx Music Awards	2024	Breakout Solo Artist of the Year	Maki	Won	
Myx Music Awards	2024	Song of the Year	"Dilaw"	Nominated	
Myx Music Awards	2024	Artist of the Year	Maki	Nominated	
Myx Music Awards	2024	Music Video of the Year	"Dilaw"	Nominated	
New Hue Video Music Awards	2025	Male Artist of the Year	Maki	Won	
PhilPop Himig Handog Songwriting Festival	2025	MYX Choice Award for Best Music Video	"Kurba"	Won	
PhilPop Himig Handog Songwriting Festival	2025	Smart People's Choice Award	"Kurba"	Won	
PMPC Star Awards for Music	2024	Song of the Year	"Saan"	Nominated	
PMPC Star Awards for Music	2024	Male Pop Artist of the Year	"Saan"	Won	
PMPC Star Awards for Music	2026	Song of the Year	"Dilaw"	Won	
PMPC Star Awards for Music	2026	Male Recording Artist of the Year	"Dilaw"	Nominated	
PMPC Star Awards for Music	2026	Male Pop Artist of the Year	"Dilaw"	Nominated	
PMPC Star Awards for Music	2026	Collaboration of the Year	"Sikulo" (with Angela Ken and Nhiko)	Nominated	
P-pop Music Awards	2024	Artist of the Year	Maki	Nominated	
P-pop Music Awards	2024	Song of the Year	"Dilaw"	Nominated	
P-pop Music Awards	2024	Music Video of the Year	"Dilaw"	Nominated	
P-pop Music Awards	2024	Production Design in a Music Video	"Namumula"	Nominated	
P-pop Music Awards	2024	Breakthrough Artist of the Year	Maki	Won	
P-pop Music Awards	2024	Solo Artist of the Year	Maki	Nominated	
P-pop Music Awards	2024	Favorite Streamed Artist	Maki	Awardee	
P-pop Music Awards	2025	Artist of the Year	Maki	Nominated	
P-pop Music Awards	2025	Album of the Year	Kolorcoaster	Nominated	
P-pop Music Awards	2026	Collaboration of the Year	"Luck" (with James Reid)	Nominated	
VP Choice Awards	2025	Headliner of the Year for Music	Maki	Won	
VP Choice Awards	2026	Solo Performer of the Year	Maki	Nominated	
VP Choice Awards	2026	OPM Song of the Year	"Kahel na Langit"	Nominated	
Wish Music Awards	2025	Wishclusive Pop Performance of the Year	"Dilaw"	Nominated	
Wish Music Awards	2025	Wishclusive Collaboration of the Year	"Sikulo" (with Angela Ken and Nhiko)	Nominated	
Wish Music Awards	2025	Wish Breakthrough Artist of the Year	Maki	Nominated	
Wish Music Awards	2026	Wishclusive Pop Performance of the Year	"Kahel na Langit"	Nominated	
Wish Music Awards	2026	Wishclusive Pop Song of the Year	"Bughaw"	Nominated	
Wish Music Awards	2026	Wish Artist of the Year	Maki	Nominated	
Zeenfluential Awards	2025	Zeenfluential Music Artist	Maki	Nominated	

== Listicles ==
Publisher	Year	Listicle	Placement	Ref.
Billboard Philippines	2024	The 50 Best Songs of 2024	Placed ("Dilaw")	
Billboard Philippines	2024	The 50 Best Music Videos of 2024	Placed ("Dilaw")	
Billboard Philippines	2025	8 Anthems for Those Not Ready to Move On	Placed ("Kailan?")	
Billboard Philippines	2025	13 Halloween Costume Ideas Inspired by Your Favorite OPM Artists	Placed ("Maki")	
Billboard Philippines	2025	10 OPM Songs for Reflection and New Beginnings	Placed ("Kahel na Langit")	
Billboard Philippines	2025	Favorite Albums of 2025	Placed (Kolorcoaster)	
Billboard Philippines	2025	Favorite Songs of 2025	Placed ("Kahel na Langit")	
Billboard Philippines	2025	25 Best Filipino Albums and EPs of 2025	Placed (Kolorcoaster)	
Dazed	2025	Dazed100 Asia	Placed	
Manila Bulletin	2025	Favorite OPM albums of 2025	Placed (Kolorcoaster)	

== Concerts and tours ==
=== Headlining tours ===
List of headlining concert tours, showing dates, associated albums, locations, and number of shows
Title	Date	Countries	Shows	Ref.
Maki-Concert	November 29, 2024 – May 31, 2025	Philippines	5	
Kolorcoaster	November 7, 2025 – June 13, 2026	Philippines; United Arab Emirates; Qatar; Singapore; Indonesia	7	

=== Joint concerts and tours ===
List of special performances and appearances, showing dates, locations, and venues
Title	Date(s)	City	Country	Venue	Ref.
Maki & Silent Sanctuary US Tour with Silent Sanctuary	June 20, 2025 – July 5, 2025	Seattle; San Francisco; Las Vegas; Los Angeles; New York City; Fairfax (Note: Promoted as Washington DC)	United States	Substation Seattle; Bal Theater; The Usual Place; The Vermont Hollywood; Sounds of Brazil; Crescendo Studios	
James Reid & Maki Canada Tour with James Reid	July 11, 2025 – July 19, 2025	Winnipeg; Edmonton; Toronto; Calgary	Canada	Petrus Hall; National Event Venue Space; Southview Alliance Church; Union Hall	

=== Guest appearances ===
List of special performances and appearances, showing dates, locations, and venues
Title	Date(s)	City	Country	Venue	Ref.
A Beautiful Blur World Tour (with LANY)	October 12, 2024	Bocaue/Santa Maria	Philippines	Philippine Arena	
Bambanti Festival	January 25, 2025	Ilagan	Philippines	Queen Isabela Park	
Silakbo	February 8–9, 2025	Quezon City	Philippines	Araneta Coliseum	
Biniverse World Tour 2025 (with Bini)	February 15, 2025	Bocaue/Santa Maria	Philippines	Philippine Arena	
Alagang Suki Fest 2025	July 31, 2025	Quezon City	Philippines	Araneta Coliseum	
ASAP England	August 30, 2025	Solihull (Note: Promoted as Birmingham)	United Kingdom	bp pulse LIVE	
San Miguel Oktoberfest	September 21, 2025	Parañaque	Philippines	Okada Manila	
Pawchella	October 18, 2025	Taguig	Philippines	Venice Grand Canal Mall	
Exclusive Asia (with Rex Orange County)	August 21, 2026	Pasay	Philippines	SM Mall of Asia Arena	
Panahon Na Natin (with Angela Ken)	October 18, 2026	Quezon City	Philippines	New Frontier Theater	

=== Music festivals ===
List of music festival performances, showing dates, locations, and venues
Title	Date(s)	City	Country	Venue	Ref.
Aurora Music Festival	May 4, 2025	Angeles City/Mabalacat	Philippines	Clark Global City	
South by Southwest Sydney	October 15–17, 2025	Sydney	Australia		
LaLaLa Fest	August 21–22, 2026	Pasay	Philippines	World Trade Center Metro Manila	
One Zone Fest	October 24–25, 2026	Quezon City	Philippines	Araneta Coliseum	
