= Dilaw (song) =

Single by Maki

from the album Kolorcoaster
- Language: Tagalog
- English title: Yellow
- Released: May 24, 2024
- Genre: Indie alternative
- Length: 3:12
- Label: Tarsier
- Songwriters: Ralph William Datoon; Viktor Nhiko Sabiniano
- Producer: Viktor Nhiko Sabiniano

Maki singles chronology
"Sikulo" (2024)	"Dilaw" (2024)	"Kurba" (2024)

Music video
- "Dilaw" on YouTube

"Dilaw" (lit. 'Yellow' in Tagalog) is a song by Filipino singer Maki. It was released as a digital pre-single for his debut album, Kolorcoaster, on May 24, 2024, through Tarsier Records, and was written by Ralph William Datoon and produced by Nhiko Sabiniano. "Dilaw" is an indie alternative track that explores the themes of unconditional love. The music video, co-directed by Jaydee Alberto and Maki, portrays a romantic narrative between two young artists, played by Maki and Maloi of the P-pop girl group Bini. Set in a high school, the video uses art as a central theme to depict the characters' growing bond, with visual elements symbolizing the joy and color one person can bring into another life.

The song peaked at number one on Billboard's now defunct Philippines Songs chart, topping the chart in its final issue. It later debuted atop the newly relaunched Billboard Philippines Hot 100, becoming the first song to rank number one on the chart. On Spotify, "Dilaw" set the record for the platform's highest single-day streams by an OPM song and contributed to Maki's success as the male OPM artist with the most monthly listeners.

== Background ==
On September 22, 2023, Maki released the extended play (EP) Tanong (lit. 'Question'), which featured five new tracks: "Sigurado?" (lit. 'Sure?'), "Saan?" (lit. 'Where?'), "Siguro...?" (lit. 'Probably?'), "Kailan?" (lit. 'When?'), and "Bakit?" (lit. 'Why?'). "Saan?" and "Bakit?" became viral hits. After the success of the EP and the single "Saan?", Maki followed up with the released with the tracks "HBD" and "Sikulo" (Cycle) before releasing "Dilaw" as a standalone single on May 24, 2024.

== Composition and lyrics ==
"Dilaw"
A 18-second sample of "Dilaw", where the chorus can be heard.

"Dilaw" is three minutes and twelve seconds long; the song was produced by Nhiko Sabiniano and composed by Maki (Note: credited under his real name Ralph William Datoon) and Nhiko Sabiniano. It has been described as an indie alternative track and explores themes of unconditional love, likening hope and happiness to the color yellow "as it captures the experience of finding love after overcoming a painful past". Revealed to be inspired by a conversation that Maki shared with his former lover, who had opined that "the love [Maki] gave was not a calm love", the song has also been noted to imagine love as "a calm, joyful, and warm emotion, like the color yellow".

In a podcast of Billboard Philippines, Maki explained that the single was written for himself and was inspired by a conversation with a former partner who described his love as intense and overwhelming. He described the songwriting process as therapeutic, allowing him to process his emotions and reassess his perspective on relationships. He expressed hope that listeners of Dilaw would find comfort and inspiration.

== Promotion and release ==
The song, along with its accompanying music video, was released on May 24, 2024. To commemorate its release, Maki held the song's eponymous mini music festival, Dilaw Fest, at McKinley Whiskey Park on May 25. The event featured performances by Maki, alongside guest performers Nameless Kids, Ysanygo, Jikamarie, Angela Ken, Janine Teñoso, and Jolianne. On August 2, 2024, Maki performed "Dilaw" live on the Wish 107.5 Bus.

In March 2025, Maki said that "Dilaw" was part of his upcoming first full-length album, titled Kolorcoaster and scheduled for release on September 19, 2025. He also announced that the album would include a slowed-down version of "Dilaw". A special rendition of the song was released on March 26 as the theme soundtrack of the Filipino film My Love Will Make You Disappear.

== Music video ==
Co-directed by Jaydee Alberto and Maki, the song's music video has been noted to highlight art as a medium for storytelling as it depicts the romantic relationship between two young artists. The video features Maki and Maloi, a member of the P-pop group Bini, as high school students who meet and bond over their shared love of art and adventure. As the video progresses, Maki's character gradually brings color—both literally and figuratively—into the life of Maloi's character, visually depicting the blossoming romance between them with a reference to the song's intention of "symboliz[ing] the happiness and positivity someone brings into your life".

After its release on May 24, 2024, the music video became the top trending video on YouTube Philippines, garnering over two million views within the first two weeks. In December 2024, the music video of "Dilaw" was included in Billboard Philippines' list of The 50 Best Music Videos of 2024. "Dilaw" was recognized as the top four music video of 2024 on YouTube in the Philippines.

== Reception ==
=== Reviews ===
Writing for Billboard Philippines, Gabriel Saulog praised "Dilaw" for its "emotional resonance and heartfelt lyrics", highlighting the song's ability to capture the essence of youthful longing and vulnerability. Billboard Philippines also included the track in its list of The Best Songs of 2024.

=== Commercial performance ===
Following its release on May 24, 2024, "Dilaw" debuted at number four on Billboard's Philippines Songs chart. The song maintained a place in the top five for three weeks, before peaking at number one for two consecutive weeks on the charts dated June 22 and 29, 2024, which served as the Philippines Songs' final issues. The song later debuted at number one on the Billboard Philippines Hot 100 for the weeks of July 6 and 13, 2024, becoming the first song to top the relaunched chart. It also topped the first two inaugural issues of Billboard Philippines' Top Philippine Songs chart for the same period. The song appeared on Spotify Viral charts in several counting, including Saudi Arabia, Singapore, New Zealand, Canada Hong Kong, Taiwan, Malaysia, and the United Arab Emirates.

On Spotify, "Dilaw" set the record for the highest single-day streams achieved by an OPM song on the platform with 1.1 million streams. This contributed to Maki's achievement of becoming the male OPM artist with the most monthly listeners on Spotify, at more than 6.5 million users. In August 2024, the song surpassed 100 million streams on Spotify. On October 12, 2024, Maki performed the song at LANY's concert at the Philippine Arena in Bocaue, Bulacan, which was also played by LANY frontman Paul Klein. It was also recognized by Spotify as its top two song in the Philippines for 2024, and by Google as its tenth most searched song in the Philippines for the year.

In January 2025, the International Federation of the Phonographic Industry (IFPI) announced the launching of The Official Philippine Chart, with "Dilaw" placing at number eleven in the chart. At the inauguration of The Official Philippines Chart on February 19, "Dilaw" was recognized as its top two Local Song of the Year. In December, "Dilaw" was recognized by Apple Music Philippines among its Top OPM Songs of 2025, placing third.

== Adaptations ==
A parody of the song, titled "Hilaw" (lit. 'Raw' in Tagalog), was released on the comedy show Bubble Gang on November 24, 2024, with Yaki (parody of its singer Maki) as a singer played by Michael V. on the Waste Truck (a parody of Wish 107.5's radio bus). The song evokes a message on the importance of being a true Filipino by speaking the Filipino language correctly.

== Accolades ==
The song received multiple nominations, including Song of the Year at the 9th Ppop Music Awards and both Song of the Year and Music Video of the Year at the 2024 Myx Music Awards.

In 2025, "Dilaw" was nominated for Wishclusive Pop Performance of the Year at the Wish Music Awards and for Best of Listeners' Choice: International Song at Music Awards Japan. On July 27, it won Song of the Year at the New Hue Music Awards and also earned a nomination for Male Artist of the Year and Song of the Year at the Jupiter Music Awards.

Award	Year	Category	Result	Ref.
Awit Awards	2025	Best Pop Recording	Won	
Jupiter Music Awards	2025	Male Artist of the Year	Nominated	
Jupiter Music Awards	2025	Song of the Year	Nominated	
Jupiter Music Awards	2025	Music Video of the Year	Nominated	
Music Awards Japan	2025	Best of Listeners' Choice: International Song	Nominated	
Myx Music Awards	2024	Song of the Year	Nominated	
Myx Music Awards	2024	Music Video of the Year	Nominated	
New Hue Video Music Awards	2025	Song of the Year	Won	
P-pop Music Awards	2024	Song of the Year	Nominated	
P-pop Music Awards	2024	Music Video of the Year	Nominated	
PMPC Star Awards for Music	2026	Song of the Year	Won	
PMPC Star Awards for Music	2026	Male Recording Artist of the Year	Nominated	
PMPC Star Awards for Music	2026	Male Pop Artist of the Year	Won	
Wish Music Awards	2025	Wishclusive Pop Performance of the Year	Nominated	

== Listicles ==
Publisher	Year	Listicle	Placement	Ref.
Billboard Philippines	2024	The 50 Best Songs of 2024	Placed	
Billboard Philippines	2024	The 50 Best Music Videos of 2024	Placed	

== Charts ==
=== Weekly charts ===
Weekly chart performance for "Dilaw"
Chart (2024–2025)	Peak position
Philippines (Billboard)	1
Philippines Hot 100 (Billboard Philippines)	1
Philippines Top Songs (Billboard Philippines)	1
Philippines (IFPI)	11
UAE (IFPI)	20

=== Year-end charts ===
Year-end chart performance for "Dilaw"
Chart (2024)	Position
Philippines Hot 100 (Billboard Philippines)	2
Philippines Top Songs (Billboard Philippines)	2

Chart (2025)	Position
Philippines Hot 100 (Billboard Philippines)	17
Philippines Top Songs (Billboard Philippines)	10

== Credits and personnel ==
Credits are adapted from Apple Music.

- Maki – vocals
- Ralph William Datoon – songwriter
- Viktor Nhiko Sabiniano – songwriter, producer

== Release history ==
Release history and format for "Dilaw"
Region	Date	Format(s)	Label	Ref.
Various	May 24, 2024	Digital download; streaming media	Tarsier Records	
