= Tarsier Records =

- Parent company: Star Music
- Founded: September 5, 2017
- Founder: Chris Lopez
- Distributor: Star Music Publishing
- Genre: Various
- Country of origin: Philippines
- Location: ELJ Communications Center, Eugenio Lopez St., Diliman, Quezon City, Metro Manila

Tarsier Records is an imprint of the Filipino record label Star Music, which in turn owned by media and entertainment conglomerate ABS-CBN Corporation. It was established on September 5, 2017 by Chris "Moophs" Lopez and is based in Quezon City. Among its most popular artists are Iñigo Pascual, Angela Ken, Sam Concepcion, Marion Aunor, KZ Tandingan, and Maki.

== History ==
Tarsier Records was launched in 2017 by music producer Chris Lopez (also known as Moophs) as a subsidiary of Star Music with the goal of writing, producing, distributing and promoting Philippine music to a wider international audience. They launched with an eight-track EDM album. Their inaugural artists included established artists Sam Concepcion, Kiana Valenciano, Marion Aunor, and new artist Markus.

By 2020, the label started collaborating with foreign artists. These included Brian McKnight Jr. (the son of Brian McKnight), Zee Avi, and Eric Bellinger. By 2021, the label had grown with 33 artists signed to its label from different genres such as EDM, R&B, and rap. To celebrate, they held a virtual concert, TY 2021, at the end of the year.

2023 saw the rise of Maki, who was signed in 2021. His debut EP Tanong saw significant success on Spotify that year, while the following year, he became the first artist to have the first number-one track on Billboard Philippines' relaunched Philippines Hot 100 chart.

== Notable artists ==
- AC Bonifacio
- Iñigo Pascual
- KZ Tandingan
- Maki
- Sam Concepcion
- Marion Aunor
- Kiana Valenciano
- Markus
- Bugoy Drilon
- Brian McKnight Jr.
- Anji Salvacion
- Angela Ken
