= 2026 in Philippine music =

The following is a list of events and releases related to Philippine music that have happened or are expected to happen in 2026.

== Events ==
- January 11 – The 11th edition of Wish 107.5 Music Awards is held at the Araneta Coliseum.
- January 17 – The OST Dreamers consisting of Arvery Love Lagoring and Christian Tibayan win the second duet edition of Tawag ng Tanghalan segment on It's Showtime.
- January 22 – The Manila Symphony Orchestra celebrates its centennial anniversary.
- February 1 – Arabelle dela Cruz, under her stage name "Laguna Diva", wins the South Korean singing competition Veiled Cup.
- March 24 – The third edition of Billboard Philippines Women in Music is held at Maybank Performing Arts Theater in Taguig, with Regine Velasquez named as Woman of the Year.
- April 12 – The duo consisting of JM dela Cerna and Marielle Montillano wins the fourth season of singing impersonation reality show Your Face Sounds Familiar.
- April 30 – Girl group Bini receives the Global Force Award at the Billboard Women in Music held at Hollywood Palladium in California, United States.
- May 28 – Zack Tabudlo is included in this year's Forbes 30 Under 30 Asia list.
- June 13:
  - Yannie Basical of Bataan wins the tenth season of Tawag ng Tanghalan segment on It's Showtime.
  - "Multo" by alternative pop-rock band Cup of Joe wins Best Song Asia category at the 2026 Music Awards Japan.
- June 25 – The 17th edition of PMPC Star Awards for Music is held at Teatrino Promenade in San Juan.
- August 30 – "Sobra Sobra" interpreted by Carmelle Collado wins the inaugural Philippine selection for Eurovision Song Contest Asia held at New Frontier Theater in Quezon City.
- September 4 – Lea Salonga is inducted into the Hollywood Walk of Fame in Los Angeles, United States, becoming the first Filipino act to do so.
- September 6–15-year old Hannah May of Pangasinan wins the inaugural The Clash Teens.
- September 9 – President Bongbong Marcos signs Proclamation No. 1414 granting the National Artist of Music status to composer and conductor Alfredo Buenaventura.
- September 15 – The 39th edition of Awit Awards is held at SM Mall of Asia Arena.
- October 6 – The 2nd edition of Filipino Music Awards is held at SM Mall of Asia Arena.
- October 31 – Ena Mori wins Best Asian Creative Artist at the Golden Indie Music Awards in Taiwan.
- November 14:
  - Carmelle Collado, representing the country with the song "Sobra-Sobra", wins the inaugural Eurovision Song Contest Asia in Bangkok, Thailand.
  - Bini wins Favorite Global Music Star at the 2026 Kids' Choice Awards in the United States.
- November 16 – Pinoy pop groups Bini and SB19 receive nominations for the inaugural Best Asian Pop Music Performance award at the 69th Annual Grammy Awards in the United States for their songs "Unang Kilig" and "Visa", respectively.

== Debuting acts ==
=== Bands/Groups ===
- Fina
- Mei Mei
- Oona
- The Red Strings
- Tuesday Trinkets
- VMX Hotbabes
- Xonara

=== Solo artists ===
- Aika
- Heath Jornales
- Lee Victor
- Mariah Deborah
- Ramona
- Shean
- Uncle Dags

== Reunions and comebacks ==
- Barbie's Cradle
- Teeth
- Viva Hot Babes

== Disbanded ==
- MNL48
- Sleep Alley

== Released in 2026 ==
=== First quarter ===
==== January ====
Date	Single or album title	Artist(s)	Genre(s)	Label(s)	Ref.
5	"Sabihin Mo Lang"	Hey June!	Rock	Island Records Philippines (UMG Philippines)	
7	"The Weather"	Fly By Midnight, Over October	Rock	Underdog Music PH	
8	"Kung Magugunaw Ang Mundo"	Leyo	Pop	Sony Music Philippines	
8	"Masunog Man"	Maymay Entrata	Pop	Star Music	
9	"Ang Panata - from Manila's Finest"	Johnoy Danao	Alternative folk	MQuest Music	
9	"Tagay"	Gloc-9, Astro	Hip hop/rap	Universal Records	
9	"Malabo"	Petsanity, El Manu	Hip hop/rap	Unstable Entertainment	
9	iHeartTrap (album)	Gins & Melodies	Hip hop/rap	Independent	
12	"Katangi-tangi"	Joshua Mari	Hip hop/rap	Independent	
14	"Takot"	Brgr, Madman Stan	Hip hop/rap	Sony Music Philippines	
15	"Matamis na Pangarap"	Imogen	Pop	Star Music	
15	"Legit Check"	Smugglaz	Hip hop/rap	Independent	
16	"Kung Para Sa'yo"	Kyle Raphael	Pop	Viva Records	
16	"Ang Pag-ibig Kong Ito"	Dwta	Pop	Sony Music Philippines	
16	Between Sighs (EP)	Misha de Leon	Pop	Star Music	
16	"Nobela"	Jillian Pamat	Pop	EMI Records (UMG Philippines)	
16	"Ayaw Mo Na"	Mark Carpio	Pop	Independent	
16	"Di Na Bale"	Lani Misalucha	Pop	Independent	
16	"Sikulo (2)"	Nameless Kids	Alternative rock	Star Music	
16	"Insomnia"	Harana Sessions	Alternative rock	Nine Degrees North	
16	"Paulit-ulit"	Fly Mama!	Alternative rock	Independent	
16	"Luna"	Dro Perez	R&B/soul	Independent	
16	"Kung Saan-Saan"	1st.One	P-pop	Warner Music Philippines	
16	Wrive (album)	Wrive	P-pop	Star Music	
16	"The Battle Is The Lord's"	Gloryfall	Classic; Christian	Waterwalk Records	
21	"Kamusta Ka Na"	Jason Marvin	Pop	Sony Music Philippines	
21	"Moved On Last"	Angela Ken, Over October	Alternative	Tarsier Records	
22	"Duyan"	Ben&Ben	Alternative folk	Sony Music Philippines	
23	"Runaway"	Paolo Santos	Pop	Evolution Media	
23	"Sasabay"	Keanna Mag	Pop	Vicor Music	
23	"Malapit Na"	Jana Garcia	Pop	Universal Records	
23	"Nagkakahiyaan"	Lee Victor	Pop	GMA Playlist	
23	"Cold"	Paolo Sandejas	Pop	Independent	
23	"Finally"	Sam Benwick	Pop	Independent	
23	"Romantiko"	The Cohens	Alternative	Tarsier Records	
23	"Ramdam Mo Ba?"	Shanti Dope	Hip hop/rap	Universal Records	
26	"Paintings"	Young Blood Neet	Hip hop/rap	GhostWorldwide	
26	"Distymits4u"	Samsara	Hip hop/rap	Independent	
26	"Nadurog Ako"	Joshua Mari	Hip hop/rap	Independent	
29	"Hiraya Manawari"	TJ Monterde, KZ Tandingan	Pop	Independent	
29	"Tara"	Bianca Lipana	Indie pop	Sony Music Philippines	
29	"Hands of Grace"	Exalt Worship	Contemporary; Christian	CCF Media	
30	"Star Song"	Rob Deniel	Pop	Vicor Music	
30	"Ang Awit Ko Sa'yo"	Ogie Alcasid	Pop	Star Music	
30	"Wag Ka Munang Umuwi"	Jao	Pop	PolyEast Records	
30	"Muscle Memory"	Clara Benin	Pop	Sony Music Philippines	
30	"Tahan Na"	Mikee Sarmiento	Pop	Off the Record; Sony Music Philippines	
30	"Paggising Kong Muli"	Wilbert Ross	Pop	Viva Records	
30	"Labi"	Timmy Albert	Pop	Universal Records	
30	"Empty House"	Bugoy Drilon	Pop	314 Studios	
30	"Over Again"	Zel Bautista, Mix Fenix	Pop	Ava Records	
30	"Tatanggapin"	Michael Librada	Pop	Independent	
30	"Sa Akin"	Calein	Alternative rock	Independent	
30	"Makapiling Ka"	12th Street	Alternative rock	O/C Records	
30	What Would It Take (For You To Realize The True Evil In This World) (single album)	Typecast	Alternative rock	Tower of Doom	
30	"Comeback (Pabalik Sa'yo)"	Kiyo	Hip hop/rap	Independent	
30	"4th Floor"	Gat Putch	Hip hop/rap	Independent	
30	"Gapos"	JMara	Hip hop/rap	Independent	
30	"Locked In"	Rajondo	Hip hop/rap	Unstable Entertainment	
30	"Still In My Room"	Fern.	R&B/soul	Island Records Philippines (UMG Philippines)	
30	"Jump"	Mica Javier	R&B/soul	Jamaica LLC	
30	"Natutulala"	Matthaios	R&B/soul	Independent	
30	"Bounce That"	Billy Crawford	R&B/soul	Independent	
30	"Sige Pa"	Quest	R&B/soul	Independent	
30	Simula at Wakas: Kickoff Concert Album (live album)	SB19	P-pop	Sony Music Philippines	
30	Pasakalye (album)	Vxon	P-pop	Cornerstone Music	
30	"Bwan"	6ense	P-pop	Sony Music Philippines	

==== February ====
Date	Single or album title	Artist(s)	Genre(s)	Label(s)	Ref.
1	"Since Day One"	Skusta Clee	Hip hop/rap	Saucy Island	
1	Kaye Cal Live Sessions (single album)	Kaye Cal	Pop	Independent	
5	"Matik"	John Roa	Pop	Viva Records	
5	"Labs Kita"	Shane Dandan	Pop	Viva Records	
5	"Kasalanan"	Mika Salamanca	Pop	Star Music	
5	"Baka Sakali"	Eunice Janine, Hyeonyul Kim	Pop	TVJ Productions	
5	"Dalaw"	Gloc-9, Bushnu Paneru	Hip hop/rap	Universal Records	
5	"Wenna"	Sica	Hip hop/rap	Greenhouse Records	
5	"Kahit May Kilig"	Hi-C	Hip hop/rap	6G Music	
5	"Isang Gabi"	Apekz	Hip hop/rap	Independent	
5	"'Di Ka Tinatago"	Jnske	Hip hop/rap	Independent	
5	"Luv Somebody"	Because, Fern.	R&B/soul	Viva Records	
5	"Lapit Kapit"	Eliza Maturan, Illest Morena	R&B/soul	Unstable Entertainment	
8	"Paralisado"	Arthur Nery, Adie	R&B/soul	Viva Records	
9	"Sinong Magmamahal Sa 'Kin?"	KZ Tandingan	Pop	Independent	
11	"The One To Blame"	Clara Benin	Pop	Sony Music Philippines	
11	"Sa Ating Pag-ibig"	Shirebound	Indie rock	Independent	
11	"Tayo Nang Dalawa"	APO Hiking Society	OPM	Independent	
11	"Spend That"	Amayajane, Zae	R&B/soul	Independent	
12	Maduming Timog (album)	Hev Abi	Hip hop/rap	Independent	
	Wander Boy (album)	Rob Deniel		Vicor Music	
13	"Aminin"	Dom Guyot, Jolianne	Pop	Sony Music Philippines	
13	"Sino Ang Tanga?"	Maris Racal	Pop	Nine Degrees North	
13	"Na Para Bang"	Mariah Deborah	Pop	Nine Degrees North	
13	"Alanganin"	Le John	Pop	Independent	
13	"Bagong Kinabukasan"	Noel Cabangon	Folk	Jesuit Music Ministry	
13	"Sayang Na Sayang"	Imago	Rock	Sony Music Philippines	
13	"Aswang sa Maynila"	Fitterkarma, Novocrane	Rock	OneRPM	
13	"Natataranta"	Sugarcane	Alternative	Entity Music Philippines	
13	"Season 1, Episode 43"	Carousel Casualties	Alternative pop	Offshore Music	
13	"Dear Butterfly (A Heartbroken Letter)"	Razorblackman	Alternative pop	Razorblackman/Redievan Stoggs (Independent)	
13	"'Di Mo Alam"	Alisson Shore	Hip hop/rap	Labyrinth Records	
13	"Lunod"	Hori7on	P-pop	Curve Entertainment	
19	"Fresh"	BGYO	P-pop	Star Music	
20	Like U (album)	Belle Mariano	Pop	Star Music	
20	"Kung Akin Ang Mundo"	Kyle Echarri	Pop	Star Music	
20	"Kahit Pa"	EJ de Perio	Pop	Sony Music Philippines	
20	"Huli Na Ba Ang Lahat?"	Kenaniah	Pop	O/C Records	
20	"Maligaya Street"	Arthur Miguel	Pop	Nine Degrees North	
20	"Balato Mo Na Sakin 'To Lord"	Daryl Ong	Pop	OneRPM	
20	Chlara's Lullabies (EP)	Chlara	Pop	Evolution Media	
20	"Pinangga Ta Ka"	JM dela Cerna, Marielle Montillano	Visayan	Star Music	
20	"Bloods and Crips"	Shanti Dope	Hip hop/rap	Universal Records	
20	"Ebidensya"	Robledo Timido	Hip hop/rap	RealWrld	
20	"Lason"	Teys	Hip hop/rap	OneRPM	
20	My Illicit Love Fantasies (album)	Hi-C	Hip hop/rap	6G Music	
20	"Para Lang Sa'yo"	Yoki, Because	Hip hop/rap	Independent	
20	"Di Papasakop"	Morobeats	Hip hop/rap	Independent	
20	"All Day"	Matthaios	R&B/soul	Independent	
20	"IMissOlongapo"	Ron David	R&B/soul	RealWrld	
20	"Visa"	SB19	P-pop	Sony Music Philippines	
20	"Paramdam"	Fina	P-pop	Universal Records	
20	"Kalye"	Toto Sorioso	Christian; Pop	Jesuit Music Ministry	
20	"Paulit-Ulit"	Arvery Love Lagoring, Christian Tibayan	Soul/Ballad	Star Music	
20	"Hindi Na Mahal"	Ian Manibale, Jezza Quiogue	Pop, Ballad	Star Music	
23	"Miles Don't Matter"	Kris Lawrence	R&B/soul	Homeworkz Entertainment Services	
23	"Tuldok"	Apekz	Hip hop/rap	Independent	
23	Pag-aalaala (EP)	Various Artists	Christian; Inspirational	Jesuit Music Ministry	
25	"Sa'yo Lamang"	Christian Bautista	Ballad	Sony Music Philippines	
25	"Tumatak"	Barq	Hip hop/rap	Sony Music Philippines	
25	"Ibaling"	Fern.	Pop	Island Records Philippines (UMG Philippines)	
26	"Hagkan"	Ace Banzuelo	Pop	Sony Music Philippines	
27	Ore (EP)	Ena Mori	Pop	Offshore Music	
27	South II (album)	Elijah Canlas	Pop	Island Records Philippines (UMG Philippines)	
27	"I'm Nilalamig"	Cesca	Pop	Star Music	
27	"Bingo"	DNA	Pop	Star Music	
27	KD Estrada (album)	KD Estrada	Pop	Star Music	
27	"Ikaw Ang Wakas"	Ice Seguerra	Pop	Fire and Ice Music	
27	"Ngiti"	Carren Eistrup	Pop	PolyEast Records	
27	"Makukuha Rin Kita"	Jireh Lim	Pop	Independent	
27	"Una"	Silent Sanctuary	Alternative rock	Universal Records	
27	"Panaginip"	Jnske	Hip hop/rap	Independent	
27	Mixed Signals (EP)	$ho	Hip hop/rap	Independent	
27	"Underneath It All"	Jay R	R&B/soul	Hitmakers Entertainment LLC	
27	"Nalunod Na"	Chocolate Factory	Reggae	Independent	
27	"Brightest Star"	Brigiding	Drag	Sony Music Philippines	
27	"Huwag Mong Sabihin"	Aegis	Rock	Alpha Records	

==== March ====
Date	Single or album title	Artist(s)	Genre(s)	Label(s)	Ref.
4	"Traffic"	James Reid	R&B/soul	Careless Music; Sony Music Philippines	
5	"Unang Kilig"	Bini	P-pop	Star Music	
6	"Maging Sino Ka Man"	Leyo	Pop	Sony Music Philippines	
6	"Paumanhin"	Jed Baruelo	Pop	Sony Music Philippines	
6	"Gaga"	Ramona	Pop	Sony Music Philippines	
6	"Naghihilom"	Sponge Cola, Gigi de Lana	Rock	Sony Music Philippines	
6	"Tongue Tied"	The Ransom Collective	Alternative rock	Independent	
6	"Akasya"	Magiliw Street	Alternative rock	Entity Music Philippines	
6	"Lupit"	Gloc-9	Hip hop/rap	Universal Records	
6	"Lock and Loaded"	Gat Putch	Hip hop/rap	Greenhouse Records	
6	"BRB"	Sheki Arzaga	R&B/soul	A-Nexus	
11	"Not Me"	Amayajane, Costa Cashman	R&B/soul	Independent	
11	"Nag-aano"	Unxpctd	Hip hop/rap	Sony Music Philippines	
12	"Guhit"	Dro Perez	Pop	Independent	
12	"Asado"	The Red Strings	Pop rock	Star Music	
12	"Kailan Ka Aamin"	Vvink	P-pop	FlipMusic Records	
12	1621: Begin (album)	1621	P-pop	Star Music	
13	"'Di Na"	Earl Agustin	Pop	Vicor Music	
13	"Baka Bukas"	Angela Ken	Pop	Tarsier Records	
13	"Passenger Princess"	Earl Generao	Pop	Universal Records	
13	"Deja Vu"	Timmy Albert	Pop	Universal Records	
13	"MaGirl"	Will Mikhael	Pop	Universal Records	
13	"Tayo ay Bagay"	Jamiela	Pop	PolyEast Records	
13	"Bakit Hindi"	Mikee Sarmiento	Pop	Off the Record; Sony Music Philippines	
13	"Ikaw Ang Musika"	Wilbert Ross, Bea Binene	Pop	Viva Records	
13	"Stay"	Carmelle Collado	Pop	Star Music	
13	"Kung Ikaw ay Bibitaw"	Julie Anne San Jose	Pop	Independent	
13	"Grabe Ka Naman Saktan"	Abby Asistio	Pop	Independent	
13	"Umiikot ang Mundo"	Snakefight	Pop punk	O/C Records	
13	"Pasakit"	Shamrock	Rock	Independent	
13	"Pagbigyan"	Hero	Hip hop/rap	Independent	
13	"Eabab"	Marina Summers	Drag	Sony Music Philippines	
13	"Halo Slayer"	Finix	P-pop	GKD Records	
13	"Wala Nang Iba"	Gloryfall	Classic; Christian	Waterwalk Records	
16	"Pagmamahal"	Hey June!	Rock	Island Records Philippines (UMG Philippines)	
16	"My Heart"	Join the Club	Alternative rock	Universal Records	
16	Pablo: Flood the Streets Mixtape (album)	Young Blood Neet	Hip hop/rap	Independent	
18	"Cinnamon Coffee"	Clara Benin	Pop	Sony Music Philippines	
20	"Ikaw Lang, Mahal"	Ogie Alcasid	Pop	Star Music	
20	Woman Like Me (EP)	Dia Maté	Pop	Radical Music, Inc.	
20	"Kanlungan"	Jeremy Glinoga, Jarea	Pop	Tarsier Records	
20	"Pilit Pinili"	Bugoy Drilon	Pop	314 Studios	
20	"Gabi"	Nicole	Pop	Ivory Music and Video	
20	"'Di Ko Pa Kaya"	Jireh Lim	Pop	Independent	
20	Mr. Nonchalant (EP)	Sam Benwick	Pop	Independent	
20	"Trip Lang"	One Click Straight (feat. Raymund Marasigan)	Rock	Island Records Philippines (UMG Philippines)	
20	"Oh My Lover"	Steve Badiola	Rock	Evolution Media	
20	Pasimple (EP)	Imago	Pop rock	Sony Music Philippines	
20	"Kupido"	The Red Strings	Pop rock	Star Music	
20	"One Take Freestyle"	Shanti Dope	Hip hop/rap	Universal Records	
20	"Puff Ka"	MaxyPresko	Hip hop/rap	Independent	
20	"Damuh"	Kristina Dawn	R&B/soul	Independent	
20	"Mahal Everyday"	Matthaios	R&B/soul	Independent	
20	"Bakit Ba Ikaw? (Why You Are the One?)"	Michael Pangilinan, Khel Pangilinan, Chris Walker	R&B/soul	Evolution Media	
20	"Naging Tayo"	Project: Romeo	Alternative folk	Independent	
22	"Mundo"	Guddhist Gunatita	Hip hop/rap	Independent	
22	"All the Way" (Early Version)	Razorblackman	Punk rock/alternative	Razorblackman/Redievan Stoggs (Independent)	
23	"Get Me"	Raya	P-pop	Viva Records	
25	"Bersamamu"	Christian Bautista	Ballad	Sony Music Philippines	
25	"Shagansss"	Jrldm, Mhot, Blingzy One	Hip hop/rap	Independent	
26	"Ate"	Ely Buendia	Pop	Offshore Music	
26	"Hindi Ka Nagsasabi"	Mayonnaise	Rock	Yellow Room Music	
27	"'Di Ka Nag-iisa"	Vvink, Penelope, Nica del Rosario	Pop	FlipMusic Records	
27	"Kung Nandito Ka Pa"	Andrej Agas	Pop	Agas Music	
27	Anthems (album)	Bugoy Drilon	Pop, R&B/soul	314 Studios	
27	Gush (EP)	Typecast	Rock	Tower of Doom	
27	"Ipagpatawad"	Kjwan	Rock	Independent	
27	"June"	Ligaya Escueta	Rock	Offshore Music	
27	"Ayos"	I Belong to the Zoo	Alternative	Independent	
27	"Kung Sakaling Tanawin"	Alyson	Alternative	Offshore Music	
27	"Anong Gagawin Mo Ngayon?"	Fiona	Indie rock	Yellow Room Music	
27	Baby Mixtape 5	Lightskeen Baby	Hip hop/rap	Independent	
27	"The Helly What"	Kartell'em	Hip hop/rap	Independent	
27	Wakas at Simula (album)	SB19	P-pop	Sony Music Philippines	
27	ZoomBaby Dolls (EP)	Baby Dolls	P-pop	StarPop	
30	"Jesus"	RJ dela Fuente	Christian	Manila Genesis Records	
31	"Lifetime (Reimagined)"	Ben&Ben	Alternative folk	Sony Music Philippines	

=== Second quarter ===
==== April ====
Date	Single or album title	Artist(s)	Genre(s)	Label(s)	Ref.
3	"Tanging Hiling"	Noah Alejandre	Pop	Evolution Media	
3	"Punong Matibay"	Lani Misalucha	Pop	Independent	
3	"Loco"	Jeff Grecia, Nik Makino	Hip hop/rap	Independent	
3	"'Di Na Para"	PrettyMF9ine, Apekz	Hip hop/rap	Independent	
4	"Tate"	La Mave	Hip hop/rap	NPS Music	
5	"Soundtrip"	Kitchie Nadal	Rock	Independent	
5	"Down Ka Ba?"	Nateman	Hip hop/rap	Independent	
8	"Lambing"	Lola Amour	Alternative	New Levels	
8	"One And Only"	Sheki Arzaga	R&B/soul	A-Nexus	
9	Signals (EP)	Bini	P-pop	Star Music	
9	"2Good4U"	Denise Julia	R&B/soul	2nd Floor Entertainment	
9	"Booze"	Teys, Gunna Lex	Hip hop/rap	AboveAll	
10	"Nananabik"	Rhodessa	Pop	Viva Records	
10	"Love Will Lead You Back, Tinatapos Na Ba?"	Erik Santos	Pop	Star Music	
10	"Stranger's Funeral"	Chezka	Pop	Underdog Music PH	
10	"Ba't 'Di Sabihin"	Yana and Yna	Pop	Ivory Music and Video	
10	"Can We Go Back?"	Kim Leo	Pop	PolyEast Records	
10	"Dahlia"	Icy D, Jerome Banaay	Pop	Got Name	
10	"Hinahanap"	Alys	Pop	Passionate Kids	
10	Huling Pag-ibig (EP)	Mark Carpio	Pop	Independent	
10	"Uwi Ka Na (Sa Akin)"	Geiko	Pop	Independent	
10	"Minsan"	Tothapi	Alternative rock	Sony Music Philippines	
10	"Ako Naman"	Gloc-9, Oxsmugg	Hip hop/rap	Universal Records	
10	"Hiraya"	Mark Andre	Hip hop/rap	Mabuhay Music Group	
10	"We Will Praise Him"	Gloryfall	Contemporary; Christian	Waterwalk Records	
11	"It's Tootsie"	Tootsie Guevarra	Pop	Monaco Productions	
15	"Anik Anik"	Sean Archer	Pop	Sony Music Philippines	
15	"Banana"	GA Chillerong Ghetto, Paul N' Ballin	Hip hop/rap	Always in Motion	
15	"Make A Move"	Barq	Hip hop/rap	Sony Music Philippines	
15	"True Brown Style"	Syper One, Pricetagg	Hip hop/rap	Tambayan Records	
16	"Tabi"	Dwta	Pop	Sony Music Philippines	
16	"Bahala Na"	Jason Marvin, Petsanity	Pop	Sony Music Philippines	
17	Jason Dy: X (EP)	Jason Dy	Pop	Star Music	
17	"Mananatili"	Over October	Alternative rock	Underdog Music PH	
17	"Sinungaling"	Nameless Kids	Alternative rock	Star Music	
17	"Sa Walang Hanggan"	Healy After Dark	Alternative rock	O/C Records	
17	"Tapos Na Yung Atin"	Gat Putch	Hip hop/rap	Greenhouse Records	
17	"Foreigner"	Realest Cram	Hip hop/rap	GhostWorldwide	
17	"Uwi Ka Na"	Matthaios	R&B/soul	Independent	
18	"Inay"	Maxie Andreison	Pop	Independent	
20	"Pagdating ng Panahon (25 Years Later)"	Ice Seguerra	Ballad	Vicor Music; Fire and Ice Music	
20	"WSKNNNMN"	Hellmerry, Ron Henley, Scoop Dogg	Hip hop/rap	Young God Records	
20	MJ	Because	Hip hop/rap	Viva Records	
20	"Fly With It"	Hori7on	P-pop	Curve Entertainment	
22	"Love Like U"	Ashtine Olviga	Pop	Viva Records	
22	"Tadhana't Dalangin"	Nobita	Alternative rock	Sony Music Philippines	
23	"Kapalit ng Lahat"	Joshua Mari	Hip hop/rap	Independent	
24	Really Got Me Thinking (EP)	Clara Benin	Pop	Sony Music Philippines	
24	"Alon"	Kevin Montillano	Pop	KDR Music House	
24	"Lambing"	Leila	Pop	Yellow Room Music	
24	"Step By Step"	Sam Benwick	Pop	Independent	
24	"Panatag"	Adie	R&B/soul	O/C Records	
24	"Ice Pie"	Kyleswish, Juan Caoile	R&B/soul	Viva Records	
24	"Niloloko Mo Lang Sarili Mo"	Banda ni Kleggy	Rock	Soupstar Music	
24	"Too Young to be Old"	Orange and Lemons	Alternative rock	Lilystars Records	
24	"Espasyo"	Caña	Indie rock	ONErpm	
24	"Kung Masusunod"	Jan Roberts, Johnoy Danao	Folk	Independent	
24	"Kahinaan Ko"	Shanti Dope	Hip hop/rap	Universal Records	
24	"Lahat ng Homies"	Gat Putch	Hip hop/rap	Greenhouse Records	
24	"G6"	Gins&Melodies	Hip hop/rap	Downtown Q' Entertainment	
24	"Get That Bag"	Lightskeen Baby	Hip hop/rap	Hoodfamous	
24	"Kapag Ngumingiti Ka"	GAT	P-pop	Ivory Music and Video	
25	"Super+10"	Sajka	Hip hop/rap	Independent	
26	"Okei"	Jom	Hip hop/rap	Viva Records	
27	"Hot"	Youngsta	Hip hop/rap	Independent	
29	"Paraiso"	It All Started in May	Alternative	Viva Records	
30	Kung Ano Ano (EP)	Sean Archer	Pop	Sony Music Philippines	

==== May ====
Date	Single or album title	Artist(s)	Genre(s)	Label(s)	Ref.
1	"Hinga"	Janine Teñoso	Pop	Vicor Music	
1	"Taghoy ng Puso"	Gerald Santos	Pop	PolyEast Records	
1	"Morena"	Carmelle	Pop	Star Music	
1	"Kay Dali Mong Ibigin"	Noah Alejandre, Scottie Doesn't Know	Pop	Munti Records	
1	"'Di Na Muli"	Jnske	Pop	Independent	
1	"Young Stunna"	Sandwich	Rock	PolyEast Records	
1	Sandali (EP)	Cup of Joe	Alternative rock	Viva Records	
1	"Sunshine"	Calein	Alternative rock	Independent	
1	"Malupet Kame Pumorma"	Gat Putch, Sica	Hip hop/rap	Greenhouse Records	
1	"Dance With Me"	Ron David, SJ Maglana	Hip hop/rap	RealWrld	
1	"Moves"	Nik Makino, Shao Lin	Hip hop/rap	Independent	
1	"Zeke"	Zeke Abella	Hip hop/rap	Independent	
1	"Giliw"	Fern. (feat. Al James and Kyla)	R&B/soul	Island Records Philippines (UMG Philippines)	
1	"Tuloy"	Demi, Illest Morena	R&B/soul	Sony Music Philippines	
1	"Agresibo"	Kristina Dawn	R&B/soul	ONErpm	
1	"Boomerang"	Billy Crawford	R&B/soul	Independent	
1	"Rocking Steady"	Chocolate Factory	Reggae	Independent	
1	"Darama"	Oona	P-pop	Independent	
3	"Asawa"	Nateman	Hip hop/rap	Independent	
4	"Malayo"	Ludwig Saldaña	Pop	Independent	
4	Lift Off Mixtape (album)	Nik Makino	Hip hop/rap	Independent	
6	"Torpe"	Leyo	Pop	Sony Music Philippines	
6	"Gramo"	Costa Cashman, Brgr	Hip hop/rap	Independent	
7	Autumn (Reimagined) (EP)	Ben&Ben	Alternative folk	Sony Music Philippines	
7	"Changes"	Denise Julia	R&B/soul	2nd Floor Entertainment	
8	"Kung Kailangan Mo Ako"	Mark Carpio	Pop	Sony Music Philippines	
8	Panahon (EP)	Angela Ken	Pop	Tarsier Records	
8	"Usad"	Cuatro	Pop	Ivory Music and Video	
8	"Sindi"	Arthur Miguel	Pop	Nine Degrees North	
8	"Tahan Na"	JC Herrero	Pop	ONErpm	
8	"Isa, Dalawa, Tatlo, Cha"	Yeng Constantino	Pop	Independent	
8	Fictions You Produce (album)	Arthur Nery	Pop, R&B/soul	Viva Records	
8	"Antipara"	Munimuni	Indie rock	Underdog Music PH	
8	"Bahandi"	Oh! Caraga	Visayan pop	Bahandi Records	
8	"Kalamidad"	Origin, El Manu	R&B/soul	ONErpm	
8	"Manloloko	Dom Guyot, Zae	R&B/soul	Sony Music Philippines	
10	"bad time, my guy"	Razorblackman, musicbyarwin	Alternative rock/experimental	Razorblackman/Redievan Stoggs (Independent)	
14	"Tabi"	Xonara	P-pop	Republic Records Philippines (UMG Philippines)	
15	"Pinay Pa Rin"	Janno Gibbs	Pop	GMA Music	
15	Carmelle (album)	Carmelle Collado	Pop	Star Music	
15	Lover Boy (EP)	Brent Manalo	Pop	Star Music	
15	"Kailan Ako Bibitaw?"	Ronnie Liang	Pop	RLMusic	
15	"Face Card"	Earl Generao	Pop	Universal Records	
15	"Sa'yo Lang Ako"	Liel	Pop	Unstable Entertainment	
15	"Unan (Huwag Kang Mag-alala)"	Fred Engay	Pop	Orieland	
15	"Tayo Na, Dali!"	The Bloomfields	Pop rock	Lilystars Records	
15	"Lunod"	Gloc-9	Hip hop/rap	Universal Records	
15	"Kahit Saan"	Kiddotin	Hip hop/rap	RealWrld	
15	"Listahan"	El Manu	R&B/soul	ONErpm	
15	"Dito Muna Tayo"	Syd Hartha, Toneejay	R&B/soul	Sony Music Philippines	
15	"Forever Ain't Enough"	Jay R	R&B/soul	Hitmakers Entertainment LLC	
15	"Count On Me"	Billy Crawford	R&B/soul	Independent	
15	"Paraya"	Joshua Mari	R&B/soul	Independent	
15	"Sulong"	Kaia, Hori7on, 1st.One	P-pop	Sony Music Philippines	
16	"'Di Pa Yan Huli"	Guddhist Gunatita	Hip hop/rap	Independent	
17	"Palag Na 'To"	Janine Berdin	Pop	Island Records Philippines (UMG Philippines)	
19	"Beat the Odds"	Lightskeen Baby	Hip hop/rap	Hoodfamous	
20	"Kula Yelo"	Trippie Bud, Sajka	Hip hop/rap	Sentir Music	
21	"Bawal"	Repablikan (feat. Ms. Yumi and Siobal D.)	Hip hop/rap	Sony Music Philippines	
22	"Play"	Jason Dhakal	Pop	ONErpm	
22	Persona: 2000 (album)	Fern.	Pop	Island Records Philippines (UMG Philippines)	
22	"Sulfur"	Felip	Pop	Independent	
22	"Sinisigaw"	Jireh Lim	Pop	Independent	
22	After Hours (album)	Alyson	Pop, Manila Sound	Offshore Music	
22	"Ako Naman"	Shanti Dope	Hip hop/rap	Universal Records	
22	"Saglit"	Kiddotin	Hip hop/rap	RealWrld	
22	"Fallinlove?"	Rajondo	Hip hop/rap	Unstable Entertainment	
22	"Monday to Sunday"	MaxyPresko	Hip hop/rap	Independent	
22	"14:34"	Ryannah J	R&B/soul	Rawstarr Records	
22	"Aye Mami"	Matthaios	R&B/soul	Independent	
23	"Summer Crush"	Hellmerry	Hip hop/rap	Independent	
24	"Habangbuhay Pansamantala"	Maki	Pop	Tarsier Records	
27	"Isa't Isa"	Angeline Quinto	Pop	Universal Records	
27	"Teleserye"	Shanni	Pop	Sony Music Philippines	
27	"Goma"	Moonstar88	Pop rock	EMI Records (UMG Philippines)	
28	"Teka Lang"	TJ Monterde	Pop	Independent	
28	"Kembot"	Paul N' Ballin	Hip hop/rap	Rawstarr Records	
28	"Richest Man Alive"	James Reid	R&B/soul	Careless Music; Sony Music Philippines	
28	"Kapag Handa Na Ako"	Joshua Mari	R&B/soul	Independent	
29	Mahika (EP)	Mika Salamanca	Pop	Star Music	
29	"Laguna"	Ramona	Pop	Sony Music Philippines	
29	"Papel (Kinikimkim 'to)"	Yden	Pop	Independent	
29	"I'm Good"	Jikamarie	Pop	Independent	
29	"'Di Ko Naman Masabit"	It All Started in May	Alternative pop	Universal Records	
29	"We Ousside"	O Side Mafia, Brgr	Hip hop/rap	Sony Music Philippines	
29	"Halik Sobrang Diin (Part 3)"	Gat Putch	Hip hop/rap	Greenhouse Records	
29	Trap Melodies (album)	Jeff Grecia	Hip hop/rap	Independent	
29	"Ang Sarap Mangtrip"	A$tro	Hip hop/rap	Independent	
29	"Run It"	Klly	R&B/soul	Independent	
29	It Starts With a Wink (compilation)	Vvink	P-pop	FlipMusic Records	
29	"Piliin Mo Ako"	6ense	P-pop	Sony Music Philippines	
29	"Mi Amor"	Press Hit Play	P-pop	Sony Music Philippines	
29	"Telebong (Hello Po)"	Mei Mei	P-pop	Groovy Garden Records	
29	"It's A Great Day"	Gloryfall	Classic; Christian	Waterwalk Records	

==== June ====
Date	Single or album title	Artist(s)	Genre(s)	Label(s)	Ref.
1	"Kung May Problema Ka"	Hey June!	Rock	Island Records Philippines (UMG Philippines)	
1	"Laban"	Maxie Andreison	Drag	Independent	
1	"Malapit Sa Kawalan"	Haring Manggi	Hip hop/rap	Independent	
4	On Demand (album)	BGYO	P-pop	Star Music	
5	"'Di Minamadali"	Trisha Denise, Thyro Alfaro, Soc Villanueva	Pop	Star Music	
5	"Sisimulan o Tatapusin" (album)	Jeczerius	Pop	Star Music	
5	"Baka Tayo"	Earl Agustin	Pop	Vicor Music	
5	"DJ Boom Buy"	Michael V.	Parody	GMA Music	
5	"Dalawampung Taon"	I Belong to the Zoo	Alternative	Independent	
5	"Nananabik"	Carousel Casualties	Indie rock	Offshore Music	
5	"Alon"	Similar Sky	Indie rock	Entity Music Philippines	
5	"Wind It"	apl.de.ap, Illest Morena	Hip hop/rap	Independent	
5	"Sige Lang"	Mike Kosa, Juanthugs	Hip hop/rap	Independent	
5	"Para Sa'kin"	Mrld	R&B/soul	WrldWide	
5	"Ahora"	Kristina Dawn	R&B/soul	ONErpm	
5	"Perfect Blue"	YGIG	P-pop	Underdog Music PH	
5	"Float"	Pixie	P-pop	Dreamcloud Media	
5	Mariang Ina Ko (EP)	Ryza Martinez-Solana	Contemporary; Christian	Jesuit Music Ministry	
5	Have You Heard? (Live) (EP)	Every Nation Music, various artists	Christian	Every Nation Music	
5	"Antipara (malumanay version)"	Munimuni, Any Name's Okay	Alternative folk	Underdog Music PH	
5	Good Good Juju (album)	New Lore	Indie pop	Off the Record; Sony Music Philippines	
10	"Ganun Pa Rin"	Kenaniah	Pop	O/C Records	
10	"Sugal!"	Harana Sessions	Alternative rock	Nine Degrees North	
10	"Mali"	JP Bacallan	R&B/soul	Sony Music Philippines	
11	"Magtiwala"	Mark Andre	Pop	Mabuhay Music Group	
11	"Akala Ko"	Repablikan (feat. Ms. Yumi)	Hip hop/rap	Sony Music Philippines	
12	"Tayo Na Lang"	John Roa	Pop	Universal Records	
12	"Pwede Bang Tayo Na Lang?"	Noah Alejandre	Pop	Munti Records	
12	"Bawat Daan"	Sam Mangubat	Pop	Dreamzone	
12	"Amba"	Princess Aliyah	Pop	GMV Studios	
12	"Mahiyahin"	Sassa Gurl	Pop	Independent	
12	"Bahagya"	Mariah Deborah	Pop	Nine Degrees North	
12	"Puwang"	Pastel Sky	Alternative pop	Nine Degrees North	
12	Hopia, Mani, Popcorn 3 (album)	Various artists	Rock	Viva Records	
12	"Limot"	I Belong to the Zoo	Alternative	Independent	
12	"Walang Tayo"	Caña	Indie rock	ONErpm	
12	"Kaya Ko Pala"	Gloc-9	Hip hop/rap	Universal Records	
12	"Jane"	Jeko Royo, Yuridope	Hip hop/rap	Independent	
12	"Pinaka Pretty"	Jarren	R&B/soul	Star Music	
12	"I Don't Wanna Wake You Up"	Illest Morena	R&B/soul	Independent	
12	"Pwede Ba"	Matthaios	R&B/soul	Independent	
13	4Ever Slime (EP)	OLG Zak	Hip hop/rap	GhostWorldwide	
15	"Sigabo (Original Soundtrack)"	Yeng Constantino	Rock	CCM Productions	
15	"No Baggage"	Billy Crawford	R&B/soul	Independent	
17	"Basta't Kasama Ka"	Nobita	Rock	Sony Music Philippines	
19	"Dahon"	Justin	Pop	Sony Music Philippines	
19	"Sweetheart"	Jenzen Guino	Pop	EMI Records (UMG Philippines)	
19	"Flawless"	Stef Aranas	Pop	Offshore Music	
19	"Sa Panaginip Ko"	Aquila Packing	Pop	Independent	
19	"Hiram"	Renz Verano	OPM	PolyEast Records	
19	Always Here (album)	I Belong to the Zoo	Alternative	Independent	
19	"Maryclaire"	Fitterkarma	Alternative rock	ONErpm	
19	"Superstar ng Buhay Ko"	Paham	Alternative rock	Off the Record; Sony Music Philippines	
19	"Rolex"	Shanti Dope	Hip hop/rap	Universal Records	
19	"Meron Siyang Class"	Allmo$t	Hip hop/rap	Viva Records	
19	Streetz Mixtape (album)	Zae	Hip hop/rap	Starseed Entertainment	
19	"Dance4Me"	Rajondo	Hip hop/rap	Unstable Entertainment	
19	"Sasabihin Mo Ba"	Esseca	R&B/soul	314 Studios	
24	"Mono Tarinai"	Ena Mori, Tomggg	Pop	GMP Records	
24	"Ai Shite Ruyo"	Hey June!	Rock	EMI Records (UMG Philippines)	
24	"Unlove You"	Kris Lawrence, Lil Eddie	R&B/soul	Saturno Music	
25	"Tinitingala"	Saranggola Society	Indie rock	Sony Music Philippines	
25	"Relaks"	Repablikan (feat. Ms. Yumi)	Hip hop/rap	Sony Music Philippines	
25	Love Again (EP)	Denise Julia	R&B/soul	2nd Floor Entertainment	
26	"Mawala"	Ace Banzuelo	Pop	Sony Music Philippines	
26	"Talak"	Vice Ganda	Pop	Star Music	
26	"Genuine Feelings"	Will Mikhael	Pop	Universal Records	
26	"Sa'yo Bumabalik"	Ice Seguerra	Pop	Fire and Ice Music	
26	"Bahala Na"	Letters From June, Maxie Andreison	Pop	ONErpm	
26	"Not Supposed to Fall in Love"	Leanne & Naara	Pop	Independent	
26	"Nasa Ulap"	The Rex Strings	Pop rock	Star Music	
26	"Most High"	Slick V, Sica, Ghotti Scale	Hip hop/rap	Greenhouse Records	
26	"Ewan Ko Ba"	A$tro	Hip hop/rap	Independent	
26	"Vertigo"	Alisson Shore	R&B/soul	Labyrinth	
26	"Hanggang Kailan"	Luke Mejares	R&B/soul	PolyEast Records	
26	"Hulog"	Kaia	P-pop	Sony Music Philippines	
28	Lost Files (EP)	Nateman	Hip hop/rap	Independent	
30	"Beautiful AIs"	Tanya Markova	Rock	Tower of Doom	
30	"Ulap"	Jrldm, Guddhist Gunatita, Alisson Shore	Hip hop/rap	Independent	

=== Third quarter ===
==== July ====
Date	Single or album title	Artist(s)	Genre(s)	Label(s)	Ref.
1	"Still Missing"	Kai Buizon, CRWN	Pop	Sony Music Philippines	
1	"Ayaw Mo 'Wag Mo"	JP Bacallan, Bugoy na Koykoy	Hip hop/rap	Rawstarr Records; Sony Music Philippines	
2	I'm Okay (Deluxe Edition) (album)	Moira Dela Torre	Pop	Republic Records Philippines (UMG Philippines)	
2	"Sa'yong Sa'yo"	Daniel Paringit, Project: Romeo	Alternative	Independent	
2	"Leon (Ka)"	Ez Mil	Hip hop/rap	FFP Records	
2	"'Di Ka Nakalimutan"	Repablikan, Siobal D. (feat. Ms. Yumi)	Hip hop/rap	Sony Music Philippines	
3	"Dun Ka Na"	John Roa	Pop	Viva Records	
3	"Jugjog"	VMX Hotbabes	Pop	Viva Records	
3	"Hangganan Ko"	Kai Montinola	Pop	Walt Disney Records	
3	"Lionheart"	Typecast	Rock	Tower of Doom	
3	"Sana"	Letter Day Story	Rock	Independent	
3	"Someday"	Fly Mama!	Alternative rock	Independent	
3	"Huling Mensahe"	Polaris	Alternative rock	KDR Music House	
3	"Bayan Ko"	Ronnie Liang	Patriotic	Independent	
3	"Sobrang Swabe"	Apekz	Hip hop/rap	Independent	
3	"Balewala"	SJ Maglana	Hip hop/rap	RealWrld	
3	"Uwi Na Tayo"	Amiel Sol	R&B/soul	Ivory Music and Video	
3	"Alembong"	Mei Mei	P-pop	Groovy Garden Records	
6	"FeedxCortez"	Flow G	Hip hop/rap	Independent	
7	"Higit Kalahating Milyon"	Haring Manggi	Hip hop/rap	Independent	
7	"Matsaluv"	Bilib	P-pop	AQ Prime Music	
8	"Dating Pagkatao"	Nateman	Hip hop/rap	Independent	
8	"Rock Ur Body"	GA Chillerong Ghetto	Hip hop/rap	Independent	
9	"Promise..!!!'	Janine Berdin	Pop	Island Records Philippines (UMG Philippines)	
9	"What We Love"	Maymay Entrata	Pop	Star Music	
10	"Paradise"	Jason Dhakal, Sitti	Pop	ONErpm	
10	"Amoeba"	Cheska	Pop	Underdog Music PH	
10	"Kolorete"	Carren Eistrup	Pop	PolyEast Records	
10	"Kape Tayo"	Moonstar88	Alternative rock	EMI Records (UMG Philippines)	
10	"Kalimutan Mo Na Lang"	I Belong to the Zoo, Yeng Constantino	Alternative	Cornerstone Music	
10	"Himala"	Krsitina Dawn	R&B/soul	ONErpm	
10	"Ligaya"	Raya	P-pop	Viva Records	
10	"Paligaw-ligaw Tingin"	Sugar N' Spice	P-pop	Vicor Music	
10	Tagalog Version Worship Volume 03 (EP)	Gloryfall	Classic; Christian	Waterwalk Records	
15	Contrast (album)	Yuridope	Hip hop/rap	Independent	
15	"Gabriela"	Alex Bruce	Hip hop/rap	Sony Music Philippines	
15	"God Bless Our Trip"	Tanya Markova	Rock	Tower of Doom	
17	"Tunay na Ligaya"	Juan Karlos	Pop	Island Records Philippines (UMG Philippines)	
17	Heath Jornales (EP)	Heath Jornales	Pop	Star Music	
17	"Usad"	Pablo	Pop	1Z Entertainment	
17	"Guni-guni"	Jayda Avanzado	Pop	Republic Records Philippines (UMG Philippines)	
17	"Nasaan Ka Na?"	Ashtine Olviga	Pop	Viva Records	
17	In Other Words (EP)	Leyo	Pop	Sony Music Philippines	
17	"Reminders"	Jason Marvin	Pop	Sony Music Philippines	
17	"Bali-baliktarin"	Aubrey Caraan	Pop	Vicor Music	
17	"Sa Isip Na Lang"	This Band, Yuridope	Pop rock	Viva Records	
17	"Nasalanta"	Sandwich	Rock	PolyEast Records	
17	"Batang Ako"	Gloc-9	Hip hop/rap	Universal Records	
22	"Floating"	Barbie's Cradle	Pop rock	Sony Music Philippines	
22	"TATLONG WIFE"	Bugoy na Koykoy	Hip-hop	2 Joints Enterprise	
23	"A Parallel World"	Bini	Pop	DreamWorks Animation	
23	"LUVBOMB" (album)	Jarren Garcia	Pop	Star Music	
23	"Conversations"	TJ Monterde	Pop	Independent	
23	"23"	Hellmerry	Hip hop/rap	Independent	
23	"Nagbago Ka Lang"	Repablikan (feat. Ms. Yumi, and Jslim)	Hip hop/rap	Sony Music Philippines	
23	Love Again (EP)	Denise Julia	R&B/soul	2nd Floor Entertainment	
24	"Puso"	Janine Teñoso	Pop	Vicor Music	
24	"Lasang Seryoso"	Andrew Ramos	Pop	PolyEast Records	
24	"Tulala"	Kim Leo	Pop	PolyEast Records	
24	"Mga Kabanata" (EP)	Jazper Tiongson	Pop	Star Music	
24	"Selepono"	Jan Roberts, Jikamarie	Pop	Independent	
24	"Saglit Lang"	Julie Anne San Jose	Pop	Independent	
24	No Safety Nets (album)	Hilera	Rock	Yellow Room Music	
24	"Ako Naman"	Lily	Pop rock	UMG Philippines	
24	"Round 2"	Shanti Dope	Hip hop/rap	Universal Records	
24	"2200"	Ez Mil	Hip hop/rap	FFP Records	
24	"Magkaisa Tayo"	Nateman	Hip hop/rap	Independent	
24	"Gigil"	1st.One	P-pop	Independent	
29	"Kahit Na Umulan"	Fern.	Pop	Independent	
30	"Luck"	Maki (feat. James Reid)	Pop	Star Music	
30	More Love Songs ng mga Tanga (album)	Janine Berdin	Pop	Island Records Philippines (UMG Philippines)	
31	"Lawless"	SB19	Pop	Sony Music Philippines	
31	"Sakim"	Dom Guyot, Mrld	Pop	Sony Music Philippines	
31	"Personal"	Nadine Lustre	Pop	Cool Girl Records	
31	"Kaya"	KZ Tandingan	Pop	Independent	
31	"Purgatoryo"	Fitterkarma	Rock	ONErpm	
31	"See You Again"	Barbie's Cradle	Rock	Sony Music Philippines	
31	"Pacman"	Because	Hip hop/rap	Viva Records	
31	"Holy"	King Badger, Emcee Rhenn	Hip hop/rap	Universal Records	
31	3rd World Vol. 1 (EP)	Ez Mil	Hip hop/rap	FFP Records	
31	"Naalala Mo"	Alisson Shore, Curse One	Hip hop/rap	Labyrinth	
31	"Loggin' In"	Robledo Timido, Red Dot	Hip hop/rap	RealWrld	
31	"Gumagana Na"	Delinquent Society	Hip hop/rap	Diorama FM	
31	"Boomerang"	Hero	Hip hop/rap	Independent	
31	"Buti Nakita Kita"	Matthaios	R&B/soul	Independent	
31	"Babaero"	Leanne	R&B/soul	Sony Music Philippines	
31	4:Ü (EP)	AJAA	P-pop	Star Music	
31	"Gina G."	Uncle Bob's Funky Seven Club	Disco	Sony Music Philippines	

==== August ====
Date	Single or album title	Artist(s)	Genre(s)	Label(s)	Ref.
3	"Diamante" (EP)	John Saga	Pop	Star Music	
5	"Next In Line"	Amiel Sol	Pop	Ivory Music and Video	
5	"Temporary"	Nameless Kids	Alternative rock	Star Music	
5	"Susulatan Ko Lahat"	JP Bacallan, Gloc-9	Hip hop/rap	Sony Music Philippines	
6	"Aking Mahal"	Jed Baruelo	Pop	Sony Music Philippines	
6	"Pula"	Xonara	P-pop	Republic Records Philippines (UMG Philippines)	
7	Love Like Ashtine (EP)	Ashtine Olviga	Pop	Viva Records	
7	"Atmosphere"	John Roa	Pop	Viva Records	
7	"Sepanx"	Shanni	Pop	Sony Music Philippines	
7	"Is It Over"	Angela Muji	Pop	Ivory Music and Video	
7	"Hindi Mawawala"	Angeline Quinto	Pop	Star Music	
7	"Alamat ng Baga"	Sassa Dagdag	Pop	Star Music	
7	"Bedtime Stories"	El Manu, Jessy Kang	Pop	ONErpm	
7	"Mama Mama"	SexBomb Girls	Pop	ONErpm	
7	Pusong Pabrika (EP)	Jan Roberts	Pop	Independent	
7	"Bawat Sulok"	Mark Carpio	Pop	Independent	
7	"Edi Magalit Ka"	SunKissed Lola	Rock	Independent	
7	"Tisay"	Nateman	Hip hop/rap	Independent	
7	Lauds: Walang Ibang Tahanan (Instrumental) (album)	Arnel DC Aquino, SJ	Contemporary; Christian	Jesuit Music Ministry	
10	Hating Myself So Cool (demo)	Razorblackman, Dr. Reason	Punk	Razorblackman/Redievan Stoggs	
10	"Sumabay Ka"	Ben&Ben, KZ Tandingan, Al James	Pop	Sony Music Philippines; Coke Studio Philippines	
12	"Dito Sa Amin"	Gloc-9	Hip hop/rap	Far Eastern University	
12	"Smoke Signal"	Smugglaz, Gat Putch	Hip hop/rap	Independent	
14	"Kusang Dumating"	Eliza Maturan	Pop	Unstable Entertainment	
14	"Daanan"	Jolianne	Pop	Careless Music; Sony Music Philippines	
14	"Laro"	Sanya Lopez	Pop	GMA Playlist	
14	Escape! (album)	Jason Dhakal	Pop	ONErpm	
14	"Pauwi Na Sa'yo"	Noah Alejandre	Pop	Munti Records	
14	"Nahulog Sa'yo"	Kevin Montillano, Cianne Dominguez	Pop	Independent	
14	"Tayong Dalawa"	Sugarcane, Magiliw Street	Alternative pop	ONErpm	
14	Andito Pa Rin (album)	Omar Baliw	Hip hop/rap	Independent	
14	"I Don't Wanna Wake You Up"	Illest Morena, Arizona Brandy	Hip hop/rap	Independent	
14	Gigil (album)	1st.One	P-pop	New Levels Distribution	
14	"Ave Maria"	St. Paul the Apostle Youth Choir	Christian	Jesuit Music Ministry	
14	"Even if"	Gloryfall, Mackenzie Huyssen	Classic; Christian	Waterwalk Records	
17	Pili Pinas!: Philippine Selection Night 2026 (compilation)	Various artists	OPM	Star Music	
17	"It's Not The Same as It Used to Be"	Hey June!	Rock	Island Records Philippines (UMG Philippines)	
17	"Baybayin"	Ben&Ben	Alternative folk	Coke Studio Philippines; Sony Music Philippines	
17	"Bugsay"	KZ Tandingan	Pop	Coke Studio Philippines; Sony Music Philippines	
17	"Ride Slow"	Al James	Hip hop/rap	Coke Studio Philippines; Sony Music Philippines	
20	"Sinayang Mo"	Paul N' Ballin, Nateman	Hip hop/rap	Rawstarr Records	
20	"Ikaw"	J-King	Hip hop/rap	Independent	
21	"Crazy"	Stell	Pop	1Z Entertainment	
21	Jen (Deluxe) (album)	Jennylyn Mercado	Pop	Star Music	
21	Supernatural (album)	Ace Banzuelo	Pop	Sony Music Philippines	
21	"Swerte"	Slico	Pop	Universal Records	
21	"Katabi"	Brei	Pop	Universal Records	
21	People Pleaser (album)	Kenaniah	Pop	O/C Records	
21	"Biglaan"	Lilet	Pop	Cornerstone Music	
21	"Hindi Ko Alam"	Sponge Cola	Rock	Sony Music Philippines	
21	"Do It All"	Caña	Alternative rock	ONErpm	
21	"Millionz"	Shanti Dope	Hip hop/rap	Universal Records	
21	"D2P"	Lightskeen Baby	Hip hop/rap	Hoodfamous	
21	"Nervous"	Southrll	Hip hop/rap	9K Records	
21	Undecided (album)	Jeko Royo	Hip hop/rap	Independent	
21	"God"	Kristina Dawn	R&B/soul	ONErpm	
21	"Dating Tayo"	SJ Maglana	R&B/soul	RealWrld	
21	"If Ye Love Me"	Hangad	Contemporary; Christian	Jesuit Music Ministry	
24	"Monday Afternoon"	Dionela	R&B/soul	EMI Records (UMG Philippines)	
26	"Silip"	Adie	R&B/soul	O/C Records	
26	OTW 2 Stacey (EP)	Playertwo	Hip hop/rap	Music Monks	
27	"Leaves (Reimagined)"	Ben&Ben	Alternative folk	Sony Music Philippines	
27	"Sunny Side"	James Reid, Luke April	R&B/soul	Careless; Sony Music Philippines	
28	"At Kung Sakali"	Dwta, Arthur Miguel	Pop	Sony Music Philippines	
28	"Dahan-dahan"	Ice Seguerra	Pop	Fire and Ice Music	
28	"Subukan Mo"	CJ Navato	Pop	PolyEast Records	
28	"Hardin ng Pagsuyo"	Fred Engay, Poy Lobartinos	Pop	Orieland	
28	"Sa Ilalim ng Baso"	Rocksteddy	Rock	Independent	
28	"Liminal"	Typecast	Alternative rock	Tower of Doom	
28	"Sapatos"	Gloc-9	Hip hop/rap	Universal Records	
28	"Get Litty"	Red Dot, Robledo Timido	Hip hop/rap	RealWrld	
28	"Figure Out"	Young Blood Neet, Guddhist Gunatita	Hip hop/rap	Ghost Worldwide	
28	"Forever"	Matthaios	R&B/soul	Independent	
28	"Mine"	GAT	P-pop	Ivory Music and Video	
30	God Is	Exalt Worship	Christian	CCF Media	

==== September ====
Date	Single or album title	Artist(s)	Genre(s)	Label(s)	Ref.
1	"Lason"	Skusta Clee	Hip hop/rap	Saucy Island	
2	"Dito Sa Pinas"	J-King	Hip hop/rap	Wild Kings	
3	"Summer Blue"	Pixie	P-pop	Dreamcloud Media	
3	"Meme"	Baby Dolls	P-pop	Star Music	
4	Echoes of Time (album)	John Roa	Pop	Viva Records	
4	"Donuts"	Nadine Lustre	Pop	Cool Girl Records	
4	"Saging"	Masculados	Pop	Universal Records	
4	"Hit and Run"	Chezka	Pop	Underdog Music PH	
4	"One Good Thing"	Lyn Lapid	Pop	Mercury Records	
4	Delusyonal (album)	Jemay Santiago	Pop	Independent	
4	"Tara"	Aaron Rebustes	Pop	PolyEast Records	
4	"Kontrabida"	Kakie	Pop	Curve Entertainment	
4	"Unang Tingin"	Oona	P-pop	Independent	
4	"Kapag Kapiling Ka"	Calein	Pop rock	Independent	
4	"Diri Rako"	Cookie$, Vince Lucero	Hip hop/rap	The Bakeshop Studios	
4	"Tuwing Umuulan"	La Mave	R&B/soul	NPS Music	
4	"Bye Bye"	Quest	R&B/soul	Independent	
4	"Dream Come True"	Ian Sndrz, Mark Corinth!, Cyrus Lucas, Aeakyo	Dance	Gameroom Records	
6	"Crossfade"	Illest Morena	R&B/soul	Independent	
6	"Hari ng Boom Bap"	DJ Medmessiah, Morobeats	Hip hop/rap	Independent	
9	"Isang Pag-ibig"	IV of Spades	Rock	Sony Music Philippines	
9	kung tayo'y nasa isang horror na pelikula, tiyak ako ang una mong papatayin	Fitterkarma	Rock	ONErpm	
9	"Ya Girl"	Nica del Rosario, Mathew Chang, Kakki Teodoro	Pop	FlipMusic Records	
9	"Humipak"	J-King	Hip hop/rap	Wild Kings	
10	Honey, I'm Home (album)	James Reid	R&B/soul	Careless; Sony Music Philippines	
11	"Paruparo"	Wilbert Ross	Pop	Viva Records	
11	"Focus on Me"	Juan Caoile, Kyleswish	Pop	Viva Records	
11	"Di Nanaman Tinadhana"	Noah Alejandre	Pop	Munti Records	
11	"Lumang Kodak"	Ian Quiruz	Pop	Evolution Media	
11	"Baliw Na Puso"	Dingdong Avanzado	Pop	Nine Degrees North	
11	"Sinabi Ko Na"	Destiny Palisoc	Pop	KDR Music House	
11	"Ligaw"	Gloc-9	Hip hop/rap	Universal Records	
11	"Good Love"	Gat Putch	Hip hop/rap	Greenhouse Records	
11	"Komplikado"	A$tro, Kassa, NJ	Hip hop/rap	Independent	
11	"Kobain"	Kristina Dawn	R&B/soul	ONErpm	
11	"Inakay Mo, Niyakap Mo"	Jeffrey Querubin	Inspirational	Curve Entertainment	
11	"Tenchu"	Esremborak	Indie rock	Sony Music Philippines	
11	"Dunkin"	Novocrane	Indie rock	Diorama FM	
13	"Talk Yo Shit"	Realest Cram, CK YG, Young Blood Neet	Hip hop/rap	Ghost Worldwide	
13	"Weng Weng"	Uncle Dags	Hip hop/rap	Greenhouse Records	
14	"Hanggang"	Juan Karlos	Ballad	Island Records Philippines (UMG Philippines)	
16	"Kamusta Ka Sinta"	Leyo	Pop	Sony Music Philippines	
16	Mental (EP)	Nameless Kids	Alternative	Star Music	
16	"Forget About You"	Kiana Valenciano	R&B/soul	Independent	
17	"Gitna"	Rangel	Pop	Independent	
18	"Kalendaryo"	Nicole	Pop	Ivory Music and Video	
18	"Bawat Segundo"	Kyle Raphael	Pop	Viva Records	
18	"Pagdating ng Panahon"	Iñigo Pascual	Pop	Star Music	
18	"Pamana"	Regine Velasquez	Pop	Star Music	
18	Liham (album)	Will Ashley	Pop	Star Music	
18	"Ding Dong"	Moonstar88	Pop rock	EMI Records (UMG Philippines)	
18	"Little Fire"	Steve Badiola	Rock	Evolution Media	
18	"Tunog"	Gloc-9	Hip hop/rap	Universal Records	
18	"Girls Next Door"	Sica	Hip hop/rap	Greenhouse Records	
18	"KLBW"	Mike Kosa, Smugglaz, J Skellz, Loonie	Hip hop/rap	Independent	
18	"Don't Test Me"	Matthaios	R&B/soul	Independent	
18	"Where We Gather"	Hangad	Contemporary; Christian	Jesuit Music Ministry	
18	"Ikaw Ang Lahat"	Gloryfall	Classic; Christian	Waterwalk Records	
21	Assumptions of Margarine Sandwich (EP)	Razorblackman	Pop Rock/Expermimental	Razorblackman/Redievan Stoggs	
22	"Limited Access"	Lightskeen Baby	Hip hop/rap	Hoodfamous	
23	"Balang Araw"	Diego Gutierrez	Pop	Sony Music Philippines	
23	"10pm"	Ryannah J	R&B/soul	Independent	
24	"Like Me"	Josh Cullen (feat. Jay Park)	Pop	Sony Music Philippines	
24	Martyr (EP)	Jed Baruelo	Pop	Sony Music Philippines	
24	Nine (album)	Ben&Ben	Alternative folk	Sony Music Philippines	
25	"Panata"	Mrld	Pop	Wrldwide	
25	"Tayo Lang"	Angela Ken	Pop	Tarsier Records	
25	"Slide My Way"	Will Mikhael	Pop	Universal Records	
25	South Node (album)	Armi Millare	Pop	daWorks Entertainment	
25	"Nilangaw"	Ambo Dolores	Pop	Unstable Records	
25	San Ba Pupunta? (EP)	Keanna Mag	Pop	Vicor Music	
25	"Mari Na Sa Sorsogon"	Fred Engay	Pop, Regional	Orieland	
25	"Pinatahan"	Sugarcane	Alternative pop	ONErpm	
25	"Tapos Na Ba (Tayong Dalawa)"	Lola Amour, Jan Roberts	Alternative rock	New Levels Distribution	
25	"Austerity"	Typecast	Alternative rock	Tower of Doom	
25	"Sarap Talaga"	Shanti Dope, Flow G	Hip hop/rap	Independent	
25	"Tulala"	A$tro	Hip hop/rap	Independent	
25	"Sayo Lang"	SJ Maglana	R&B/soul	RealWrld	
25	"Tama Na"	Luke Mejares	R&B/soul	PolyEast Records	
28	Realidad (album)	Hey June!	Alternative rock	Island Records Philippines (UMG Philippines)	
28	"Tayo Lang"	GH Town, J emm Dahon	Hip hop/rap	Independent	
29	"Sana Lang"	Lani Misalucha	Pop	Independent	
30	"Pabaya"	Loonie, La Mave	Hip hop/rap	Independent	
30	"Ano Ba Tayo?"	Vurse	Hip hop/rap	Independent	
30	"Gusto Ko Walo"	JP Bacallan, Bugoy na Koykoy	Hip hop/rap	Rawstarr Records; Sony Music Philippines	
30	"I know one day"	Tuesday Trinkets	Indie pop	Sony Music Philippines	

=== Fourth quarter ===
==== October ====
Date	Single or album title	Artist(s)	Genre(s)	Label(s)	Ref.
1	"Imperfect"	Xonara	P-pop	Republic Records Philippines (UMG Philippines)	
2	"10yrs"	Nadine Lustre	Pop	Cool Girl Records	
2	"Manloloko"	Ramona	Pop	Sony Music Philippines	
2	"Nahuhulog Nanaman Sa'yo"	Noah Alejandre	Pop	Munti Records	
2	"Isip"	JC Herrero	Pop	ONErpm	
2	"Horror Movie"	Eunice Rain	Pop	Off the Record; Sony Music Philippines	
2	"Paano Ba?"	The Sun	Pop rock	Unstable Entertainment	
2	"Luha ng Buwaya"	KZ Tandingan, Gloc-9	Pop, Hip hop/rap	Independent	
2	"Alam Nating Dalawa"	One Click Straight	Alternative rock	Island Records Philippines (UMG Philippines)	
2	"Tawagan"	Allmo$t	Hip hop/rap	Viva Records	
2	PPP (EP)	Apl.de.ap	Hip hop/rap	Native Boy Music; Kobalt Music Group; 606 Entertainment; GMA Music	
2	"Talak (Cypher)"	Gloc-9	Hip hop/rap	Universal Records	
2	"FNSHYT"	Ron David	Hip hop/rap	RealWrld	
2	"Anak ng Etivac"	Baloy, Uncle Daggs, Mhot, Batang Kamagong	Hip hop/rap	Independent	
2	"Round Here"	Nazty Kid, Flow G	Hip hop/rap	Independent	
2	"Forget Me Not"	Pixie	P-pop	FlipMusic Records	
2	"Ako ang bagyo"	Shean	OPM	Independent	
3	"Di Ko Tinatanggi"	Guddhist Gunatita	Hip hop/rap	Independent	
5	"Nariyan Ka Pa Ba"	Over October	Alternative rock	Underdog Music PH	
7	"Rollercoaster"	IV of Spades	Alternative	Sony Music Philippines	
7	I Know Better (album)	Kiana Valenciano	R&B/soul	Independent	
8	"Pang Habangbuhay"	Jet	R&B/soul	Homeworkz Entertainment Services	
9	"MRT"	Rhodessa	Pop	Vicor Music	
9	Dylan Menor (EP)	Dylan Menor	Pop	Universal Records	
9	"Ibang Klase"	Brei	Pop	Universal Records	
9	"Mutya"	Mark Carpio	Pop	Independent	
9	"Alon"	Bamboo	Rock	PolyEast Records	
9	"Luksa"	Gloc-9	Hip hop/rap	Universal Records	
9	Gikan Pas Gawas	Cookie$	Hip hop/rap	The Bakeshop Studios	
9	"Namamasko Po"	Mei Mei	Christmas, P-pop	Groovy Garden Records	
9	"Waiting For You"	Le John, ApMontyy	R&B/soul	Independent	
11	"Dito Ka Muna"	Gra the Great	Hip hop/rap	Independent	
12	Habambuhay (album)	Moonstar88	Pop rock	EMI Records (UMG Philippines)	
14	"Rise (Ako Ay Filipina)"	Jona	Pop	FLM Creatives and Productions	
14	"Darating Ako"	Kevin Montillano	Pop	KDR Music House	
14	"Sinasabi ng Iba"	Demy	Pop	Sony Music Philippines	
14	"Mapanatili"	The Vowels They Orbit	Alternative	Sony Music Philippines	
16	"Pag-ibig Nating Dalawa"	Eliza Maturan	Pop	Unstable Entertainment	
16	"Christmas In Manila"	Martin Nievera	Pop	Vicor Music	
16	"Baby I'm Yours"	Jireh Lim	Pop	ONErpm	
16	Highs and Lows (album)	Sam Benwick	Pop	ONErpm	
16	"Trisikulo"	Ziv, Vvink	Pop	Sony Music Philippines	
16	"Uwi"	Dom Guyot	Pop	Sony Music Philippines	
16	"Ikaw Pa Rin Talaga"	Daniel Paringit	Pop	Independent	
16	"Orasan"	Tothapi	Alternative pop	Sony Music Philippines	
16	"Ala Una"	Bert Symoun, Dreycruz	Hip hop/rap	Unstable Entertainment	
16	"Do Both"	King Badger, Emcee Rhenn	Hip hop/rap	Universal Records	
16	"Paskong Anong Saya"	Aegis	Christmas	Alpha Music	
22	"Isang Tulad Mo"	Zack Tabudlo	R&B/soul	Republic Records Philippines (UMG Philippines)	
23	"Closer"	Gehlee Dangca	Pop	Universal Records	
23	Cure for Loneliness (EP)	Shanni	Pop	Sony Music Philippines	
23	"Sa Aking Palagay"	Ian Quiruz	Pop	Evolution Media	
23	"Casual Crime"	Lyn Lapid	Pop	Mercury Records (UMG Philippines)	
23	"Together in Motion"	SB19	Pop	1Z Entertainment	
23	"Take All The Love"	Pops Fernandez	Pop	Viva Records	
23	"Muli"	Jikamarie, Flow G	Pop	Independent	
23	"A Song About Space"	Paolo Sandejas	Pop	Independent	
23	"Shelter"	CRWN, Muri	Pop	Independent	
23	"Bugambilya"	Project: Romeo	Indie pop	ONErpm	
23	"Awkward"	New Lore (feat. Clara Benin)	Alternative pop	Off the Record; Sony Music Philippines	
23	"Miss Kita"	Rocksteddy	Rock	Independent	
23	"Hawak Ang Iyong Kamay"	Kjwan	Rock	Independent	
23	Eulogy (album)	Typecast	Alternative rock	Tower of Doom	
23	No Criminal Record (album)	Bugoy na Koykoy, CK YG, Realest Cram	Hip hop/rap	2 Joints Enterprise	
23	"Bisaya Excellence"	Delinquent Society	Hip hop/rap	Diorama FM	
23	Bago ang Lahat (album)	Quest	R&B/soul	Twenty Five South	
23	Tagalog Version Worship Volume 04 (EP)	Gloryfall	Classic; Christian	Waterwalk Records	
25	"Hatid Subdo"	Supafly	Hip hop/rap	Independent	
25	"Feeva"	Karencitta	Cebuano pop	Lorega Amo Records	
28	"Super Kamote"	The Bloomfields	Rock	Lilystars Records	
29	"Sinta"	Maymay Entrata	Pop	Star Music	
30	"Tama Na Nga"	Dwta	Pop	Sony Music Philippines	
30	"Kailangan Kita"	Naara	Pop	Sony Music Philippines	
30	"Just in Case"	Trisha Denise	Pop	Star Music	
30	"Pakibulong"	Noah Alejandre	Pop	Munti Records	
30	Someone, Someday (EP)	James Reid	Pop, R&B	Careless Music; Sony Music Philippines	
30	"Bakit Nga Ba Maha Kita"	EJ de Perio	Indie pop	Sony Music Philippines	
30	"Mamahalin"	12th Street	Alternative pop	O/C Records	
30	"Ordinaryong Araw"	Sugarcane	Alternative rock	ONErpm	
30	"Wakas"	Bandang Lapis	Alternative rock	Viva Records	
30	A Little Hope Will Have to Do (album)	The Ridleys	Alternative folk	Underdog Music PH	
30	"Tara G!"	Gloc-9	Hip hop/rap	Independent	
30	"Destinasyon"	Alisson Shore, Guddhist Gunatita, Kiyo, Jrldm	Hip hop/rap	Independent	
30	"Libre Ka?"	A$tro	Hip hop/rap	Independent	
30	"Alam Mo Ba"	Zo zo	Hip hop/rap	Viva Records	
30	"Kahit Walang Tayo"	Kiddotin	R&B/soul	RealWrld	
30	"Isa"	Kyleaux	R&B/soul	Independent	
30	"Magpahinga"	Matthaios	R&B/soul	Independent	
30	"Tara Na G"	Fina	P-pop	Universal Records	
31	"Erlinda"	Munimuni, Johnoy Danao	Indie folk	Underdog Music PH	
31	"El Niño"	Kassa, Poison13	Hip hop/rap	Independent	

==== November ====
Date	Single or album title	Artist(s)	Genre(s)	Label(s)	Ref.
2	"Sama-sama Tayo"	Bini	P-pop	Star Music	
4	Dinner4two (album)	Nameless Kids	Indie pop	Star Music	
5	"Di Man Naging Tayo"	Bugoy Drilon	Pop	ONErpm	
5	"Kung Yan Ang Gusto Mo"	Joshua Mari	R&B/soul	Independent	
6	"Tsaka Nalang"	Zack Tabudlo	Pop	Republic Records Philippines (UMG Philippines)	
6	What the Body Remembers (album)	Chezka	Pop	Underdog Music PH	
6	Akda sa Pag-alala (EP)	Leyo	Pop	Sony Music Philippines	
6	"Pag-ibig ng Ikaw at Ako II"	Earl Agustin, Aika	Pop	Vicor Music	
6	"Esmerine Uy"	Daryl Ong	Pop	ONErpm	
6	"Hithit Buga"	6cyclemind	Rock	Soupstar Music	
6	Umibig, Umasa, Nasaktan, Nagmahal (EP)	Caña	Indie rock	ONErpm	
6	"Like Me"	Lightskeen Baby	Hip hop/rap	Hoodfamous	
6	"Yeah Wasak"	Paul N Ballin, Uncle Dags, Mark Beats	Hip hop/rap	Rawstarr Records	
6	"Nani"	Kristina Dawn	R&B/soul	ONErpm	
6	"Give Love On Christmas Day"	Uncle Bob's Funky Seven Club	Christmas	Sony Music Philippines	
7	"From the Ashes"	Lani Misalucha	Pop	Independent	
7	"Peybrit"	JP Bacallan, Gra the Great	Hip hop/rap	Sony Music Philippines	
7	"Pasasalamat"	Guddhist Gunatita, Baby Blood	Hip hop/rap	Independent	
11	"Susundan"	IV of Spades	Rock	Sony Music Philippines	
11	"Paasa"	The Vowels They Orbit	Alternative	Sony Music Philippines	
11	"Sarah"	Dionela (feat. John Roa)	R&B/soul	EMI Records (UMG Philippines)	
11	"O! Paraluman"	Kris Lawrence	R&B/soul	Saturno Music	
11	"Woman Divine"	APO Hiking Society	OPM	Independent	
12	Beautiful Ruins (EP)	Maymay Entrata	Pop	Star Music	
12	"Mic Check Mic Check (Alam Mo Na 'Yan)"	Vvink	P-pop	FlipMusic Records	
13	"Ating Panahon"	Amiel Sol	Pop	Ivory Music and Video	
13	"Baka Sakali"	Jolianne	Pop	Careless; Sony Music Philippines	
13	"Puyat"	Brei	Pop	Universal Records	
13	"Yugyugan"	Masculados	Pop	Universal Records	
13	"Kapit"	Mark Bautista	Pop	Viva Records	
13	"Yakap"	Fred Engay	Pop	Orieland	
13	Very Ancient Way of Crying (album)	New Lore	Pop	Off the Record; Sony Music Philippines	
13	"Maanyag"	Sitti, Dante Tanedo	Cebuano pop	Widescope Entertainment	
13	"Di Na Babalik"	6cyclemind	Rock	Soupstar Music	
13	"Penelope"	Ligaya Escueta	Rock	Offshore Music	
13	Walk With God (album)	CK YG	Hip hop/rap	Independent	
13	"Komplikado"	Jrldm	Hip hop/rap	Independent	
13	"Ang Kanyang Kaloob"	Gloryfall	Classic; Christian	Waterwalk Records	
13	"Have Yourself A Merry Little Christmas"	Keiko Necesario	Christmas	Sony Music Philippines	
18	"Dumating"	Yeng Constantino	Pop	Independent	
19	"Pakiusap Ko"	Leanne	Pop	Sony Music Philippines	
19	"Candlelit"	BGYO	P-pop	Star Music	
20	"Patuloy Lang"	CJ Navato	Pop	PolyEast Records	
20	"Nung Ikaw Ay Akin"	Janno Gibbs	Pop	GMA Music	
20	"Takda"	Dear Dahlia	Pop rock	Universal Records	
20	"Nagbago"	6cyclemind	Rock	Soupstar Music	
20	"Mr. Panggaon Taka"	Cookie$	Hip hop/rap	The Bakeshop Studios	
20	"Takure"	Because	Hip hop/rap	Viva Records	
20	"Langyang Pag-ibig"	A$tro, JMara	Hip hop/rap	Independent	
20	"Love You So"	Fern, Deny	R&B/soul	Independent	
20	"Late Night Talks"	Matthaios	R&B/soul	Independent	
20	"Rotate"	Mica Javier	R&B/soul	Homeworkz Entertainment Services	
20	"Boom Boom Boom"	Press Hit Play	P-pop	Sony Music Philippines	
20	"Ring"	Kolette	OPM	Star Music	
20	"Faithful God (I Will Sing Forever)"	Feast Worship, Bukas Palad Music Ministry	Contemporary; Christian	Jesuit Music Ministry	
20	"Sana Ngayong Pasko"	DEMI	Christmas	Sony Music Philippines	

==== December ====
Date	Single or album title	Artist(s)	Genre(s)	Label(s)	Ref.
9	Tropical Dream (album)	IV of Spades	TBA	Sony Music Philippines	

== Notable shows ==
=== Local artists ===
Date(s)	Headliner(s)	Venue	City	Event / Tour	Note(s)	Ref.
January 7	Rico Blanco, Ebe Dancel, Kamikazee, Nina, This Band	SM Mall of Asia Arena	Pasay	Broken Hearts Club	—N/a	
January 11	FILharmoniKA	The Theater at Solaire	Parañaque	One Piece Music Symphony	—N/a	
January 14–15	FILharmoniKA, Bituin Escalante	The Theater at Solaire	Parañaque	Film Music Legends: The Scores of John Williams and Hans Zimmer	Conducted by Gerard Salonga	
January 16	Philippine Philharmonic Orchestra	Circuit Makati – Samsung Performing Arts Theater	Makati	PPO 41st Concert Series V — Preludi	Conducted by Grzegorz Nowak	
January 18	1st.One	SM City North EDSA – Skydome	Quezon	ALL 1N Finale	Originally scheduled for November 23, 2025	
January 22	Manila Symphony Orchestra	Circuit Makati – Samsung Performing Arts Theater	Makati	The MSO 100th anniversary concert	With special guest, Philippine Madrigal Singers	
January 23 – February 1	Various artists	Newport Performing Arts Theater	Pasay	Bagets: The Musical	—N/a	
January 30	Jong Madaliday	New Frontier Theater	Quezon	Tamang Tiyempo	—N/a	
February 6	Cup of Joe	University of Baguio	Baguio	Stardust: Philippine Tour	—N/a	
February 6–8	SexBomb Girls	SM Mall of Asia Arena	Pasay	Get, Get, Aw!: The SexBomb Concert — rAWnd 3 to 5	—N/a	
February 6–7	TJ Monterde, KZ Tandingan	Araneta Coliseum	Quezon	In Between: Live at the Big Dome	—N/a	
February 7	Wolfgang	New Frontier Theater	Quezon	Wolfgang: The Reunion	—N/a	
February 13	Gigi de Lana, Freestyle, Neocolours	SM Mall of Asia Arena	Pasay	Stages of Love	—N/a	
February 13	Elias J TV, Sweetnotes Music	Araneta Coliseum	Quezon	Love Tunes	—N/a	
February 13	Raymond Lauchengco, Jamie Rivera	EDSA Shangri-La – Isla Ballroom	Mandaluyong	Hey It's Me, So It's You	—N/a	
February 13	Philippine Philharmonic Orchestra	Circuit Makati – Samsung Performing Arts Theater	Makati	PPO 41st Concert Series VI — Romanza	Conducted by Grzegorz Nowak	
February 13–15	Ogie Alcasid, Ryan Cayabyab, Celeste Legaspi, Basil Valdez	Rockwell Center – Proscenium Theater	Makati	Love Letters: Featuring the songs of George Canseco, Jose Mari Chan, and Willy Cruz	—N/a	
February 13–28	Various artists	Rockwell Center – Proscenium Theater	Makati	Spring Awakening	—N/a	
February 14	Jun Austria, Tito Cayamanda, Mon Espia, Mon Gaskel, Leah Navarro, Rey Magtoto, Sampaguita, Nonoy Tan	Teatrino Promenade	San Juan	Yugyugan sa Valentines	—N/a	
February 14	Klarisse de Guzman, Jed Madela, Jona Martin Nievera, Sofronio Vasquez	Newport World Resorts – Marriott Grand Ballroom	Pasay	Champions of the Heart	—N/a	
February 14	December Avenue	Araneta Coliseum	Quezon	For The Ones We Love	—N/a	
February 16	1621, Dionela, Jenzen Guino, Lola Amour, Will Mikhael, YGIG	Lucky Chinatown	Manila	Countdown to Chinese New Year 2026	—N/a	
February 21	Maki	Araneta Coliseum	Quezon	Kolorcoaster	—N/a	
February 21–22	Side A	Metropolitan Theater	Manila	Now and Then	—N/a	
February 27	Rob Deniel	Araneta Coliseum	Quezon	The Rob Deniel Show	—N/a	
February 27	Ice Seguerra	New Frontier Theater	Quezon	Being Ice Live!	—N/a	
February 28	Vxon	SM City North EDSA – Skydome	Quezon	Kalawakan	—N/a	
March 1	TJ Monterde, KZ Tandingan	University of Southeastern Philippines	Davao	In Between: Philippine Tour	—N/a	
March 5	Various artists	The Theater at Solaire	Parañaque	Mga Tanod ni Kalinaw	—N/a	
March 6	Christian Bautista, Mark Bautista	New Frontier Theater	Quezon	Bautista X Bautista	—N/a	
March 6–29	Various artists	Tanghalang Ignacio B. Gimenez, CCP Complex	Pasay	Mabining Mandirigma: A Steampunk Musical	—N/a	
March 13	Philippine Philharmonic Orchestra	Metropolitan Theater	Manila	PPO 41st Concert Series VII — Opera	Conducted by Grzegorz Nowak	
March 13–15	Ballet Manila	Aliw Theater	Pasay	Sleeping Beauty	—N/a	
March 14	SexBomb Girls	Tacloban City Convention Center	Tacloban	Get, Get, Aw!: Tacloban	—N/a	
March 20	Autotelic, The Itchyworms, Leanne & Naara, Lions and Acrobats, Mayonnaise, Sud	SM City North EDSA – Skydome	Quezon	Minsan Back to Route 196	—N/a	
March 21	Wolfgang	University of Baguio	Baguio	Wolfgang: The Reunion Philippine Tour	—N/a	
March 26	Wolfgang	SM Lanang – SMX Convention Center	Davao	Wolfgang: The Reunion Philippine Tour	—N/a	
March 26–29	Repertory Philippines	Eastwood Theater	Quezon	Unplugged	—N/a	
March 27	Various artists	Newport Performing Arts Theater	Pasay	The OPM Friends: Groovin' The Greatest Hits	—N/a	
March 28	FILharmoniKA	The Theater at Solaire	Parañaque	The Witcher in Concert	—N/a	
March 28	Cup of Joe	Waterfront Hotel & Casino	Cebu	Silakbo: Philippine Tour	—N/a	
March 28	The Rainmakers	Teatrino Promenade	San Juan	Golden Years of Binibini	—N/a	
March 28	Manila Symphony Orchestra	Ayala Malls Circuit – Recital Hall	Makati	Women of the Symphony	—N/a	
March 28–29	Alice Reyes Dance Philippines	Rockwell Center – Proscenium Theater	Makati	Tales of the Manvuvu	—N/a	
April 10–11	Manila Symphony Orchestra	Newport Performing Arts Theater	Pasay	Best of the Bee Gees Saturday Night Fever Show	—N/a	
April 10–12	Ballet Philippines	The Theater at Solaire	Parañaque	Paglalakbay: The Journey of the Sea People	—N/a	
April 17	Philippine Philharmonic Orchestra	Metropolitan Theater	Manila	PPO 41st Concert Series VIII — Coda	Conducted by Grzegorz Nowak	
April 18	Kean Cipriano, Juris Fernandez, Duncan Ramos, Ice Seguerra, Sitti, Princess Velasco, Nyoy Volante	Waterfront Hotel & Casino	Cebu	Love, Sessionistas	—N/a	
April 18	SB19	SMDC Concert Grounds	Parañaque	Wakas at Simula: The Trilogy Concert Finale	—N/a	
April 18	Johnoy Danao, GB Labrador, Project:Romeo, Syd Hartha, Tanya Markova, Toneejay	SM City North EDSA – Skydome	Quezon	Minsan Gig sa Skydome	—N/a	
April 19	Wolfgang	Waterfront Hotel & Casino	Cebu	Wolfgang: The Reunion Philippine Tour	—N/a	
April 19	Heath Jornales	SM City North EDSA – Skydome	Quezon	Heath Wave	—N/a	
April 24	Joey Generoso	Winford Resort and Casino	Quezon	Joey G Live!	—N/a	
April 25	Joey Albert	Newport Performing Arts Theater	Pasay	Fortyfied – Joey Albert 45th Anniversary	—N/a	
April 30	SexBomb Girls	SM Mall of Asia Arena	Pasay	Get, Get, Aw!: The SexBomb Concert — rAWnd 6	Originally planned to take place at the outdoor SMDC Festival Grounds in Parañaque, but was moved to the indoor SM Mall of Asia Arena due to concerns about the heat	
May 2	Cup of Joe	Iloilo Convention Center	Iloilo	Silakbo: Philippine Tour	—N/a	
May 9	Nina	Newport Performing Arts Theater	Pasay	Nina XX	—N/a	
May 15	December Avenue, Kamikazee, Flow G, Parokya ni Edgar, Zack Tabudlo	Gaisano Capital Mall – Open Grounds	Iloilo	Tanduay First Five	—N/a	
May 15–17	Ryan Cayabyab, Gigi de Lana, Bituin Escalante, Jett Pangan, Sofronio Vasquez	Rockwell Center – Proscenium Theater	Makati	What's It All About	—N/a	
May 17	Sitti	Newport Performing Arts Theater	Pasay	Sittiscape: The City of Bossa	—N/a	
May 17	Carmelle Collado	SM City North EDSA – Skydome	Quezon	Carmelle Live!	—N/a	
May 22	Brent Manalo	SM City North EDSA – Skydome	Quezon	Loverboy	—N/a	
May 23	IV of Spades	UZ Summit Centre	Zamboanga	Andalucia Tour	—N/a	
May 23	Cup of Joe	Philippine Sports Stadium	Bocaue	Sandali: The Cup of Joe Fest	—N/a	
May 29	JM dela Cerna, Marielle Montillano	SM City North EDSA – Skydome	Quezon	JMielle Sings the Icons	—N/a	
May 29	December Avenue, Kamikazee, Flow G, Parokya ni Edgar, Zack Tabudlo	SM Seaside City – Concert Grounds	Cebu	Tanduay First Five	—N/a	
May 30	Manila Symphony Orchestra	Rockwell Center – Proscenium Theater	Makati	From Mozart to Mahler	—N/a	
May 30	Cup of Joe	SM Lanang – SMX Convention Center	Davao	Silakbo: Philippine Tour	—N/a	
May 31	IV of Spades	University of Southeastern Philippines – Gymnasium	Davao	Andalucia Tour	—N/a	
May 31	December Avenue, Maki, SB19	SM Mall of Asia Arena	Pasay	Watsons Playlist 2026: Own the Moment	—N/a	
June 5–28	Repertory Philippines	Eastwood Theater	Quezon	The Man of La Mancha	—N/a	
June 6	IV of Spades	Sta. Rosa Multipurpose Complex	Santa Rosa	Andalucia Tour	—N/a	
June 6–7	FILharmoniKA	The Theater at Solaire	Parañaque	Harry Potter and the Goblet of Fire	Conducted by Gerard Salonga	
June 12	Tanghalang Pilipino	Metropolitan Theater	Manila	Mabining Mandirigma	—N/a	
June 13	Cup of Joe	Limketkai Center – Atrium	Cagayan de Oro	Silakbo: Philippine Tour	—N/a	
June 13	Mark Bautista, Dulce, Jona, Kuh Ledesma, Leah Navarro, Rita Daniela, Basil Valdez	Newport Performing Arts Theater	Pasay	Ngayon at Kailanman: The Music of George Canseco	Directed by Louie Ocampo	
June 13	Edgar Mortiz	Rockwell Center – Proscenium Theater	Makati	Goin' Standard	—N/a	
June 19–20	Ogie Alcasid	Rockwell Center – Proscenium Theater	Makati	Daddyokie	—N/a	
June 19	40 the Band, Freestyle, MYMP, Neocolours, Side A	Waterfront Hotel & Casino	Cebu	Musika 2026	—N/a	
June 20	Various drag artists	SM City North EDSA – Skydome	Quezon	Kween Con 2026	—N/a	
June 19–21	Ballet Manila	Aliw Theater	Pasay	Paquita	—N/a	
June 20	Bini	SM Mall of Asia Arena	Pasay	Signals World Tour 2026	—N/a	
June 24	Ryan Cayabyab, Elmer Borlongan	Maybank Performing Arts Theater	Taguig	Pamana: Kulay at Himig	—N/a	
June 26	December Avenue, Kamikazee, Flow G, Parokya ni Edgar, Zack Tabudlo	Davao Crocodile Park – Open Grounds	Davao	Tanduay First Five	—N/a	
June 27	IV of Spades	Aquilino Q. Pimentel International Convention Center	Cagayan de Oro	Andalucia Tour	—N/a	
June 27	The Dawn	The Theatre at Solaire	Parañaque	Kwarenta	—N/a	
June 27	Ben&Ben, Gloc-9, Maki, Vice Ganda	World Trade Center Metro Manila	Pasay	White Party Manila	—N/a	
July 3	Kyla	Newport Performing Arts Theater	Pasay	Hanggang Ngayon: The Timeless Music of Kyla	—N/a	
July 4	Manila Symphony Orchestra	Metropolitan Theater	Manila	Liberation: 80 Years of the Philippine Republic	—N/a	
July 4	Adie, Arthur Miguel, Khel Pangilinan, Rob Deniel	UNC Sports Place	Naga	Soundwave Music Fest – JUST 4 U	—N/a	
July 4	Kaia	SM City North EDSA – Skydome	Quezon	KaZAIAhan	—N/a	
July 11	TJ Monterde, KZ Tandingan	SM Bacolod – SMX Convention Center	Bacolod	In Between: Philippine Tour	—N/a	
July 11	Bini	SM Seaside Arena	Cebu	Signals World Tour 2026	—N/a	
July 11	Jose Mari Chan, Lyka Estrella, JM dela Cerna, Marielle Montillano, Kolette Madelo	Philippine International Convention Center – Plenary Hall	Pasay	Afterglow – Seasons of the Heart	—N/a	
July 11	Ben&Ben, Flow G, SB19, other various artists	Araneta Coliseum	Quezon	Puregold OPM Con Generations	—N/a	
July 12	G22	New Frontier Theater	Quezon	The Eve of an Alpha	—N/a	
July 17–18	Agot Isidro	Maybank Performing Arts Theater	Taguig	The Story of A.I.	—N/a	
July 18	IV of Spades	SM Seaside Arena	Cebu	Andalucia Tour	—N/a	
July 25–26	Wilbert Ross	New Frontier Theater	Quezon	WRten by Wilbert Ross	—N/a	
July 30	Joey Albert	Newport Performing Arts Theater	Pasay	Fortyfied – Joey Albert 45th Anniversary: The Repeat	—N/a	
July 31	Jillian Ward	New Frontier Theater	Quezon	Jillian: Star of the New Gen	—N/a	
July 31 – August 2	FILharmoniKA	The Theatre at Solaire	Parañaque	The Symphonic World of Studio Ghibli	Conducted by Gerard Salonga	
August 1	Barbie's Cradle	Music Museum	San Juan	Barbie's Cradle: One Night Only	—N/a	
August 1	Various artists	Newport Performing Arts Theater	Pasay	Sumayaw Sumunod: The Manila Sound Reunion	—N/a	
August 8	TJ Monterde, KZ Tandingan	Limketkai Center – Atrium	Cagayan de Oro	In Between: Philippine Tour	—N/a	
August 8	Hotdog	Newport Performing Arts Theater	Pasay	Hotdog: Tribute Concert	—N/a	
August 8	Lola Amour, Over October, Shirebound	Music Museum	San Juan	ALT.CHESTRA Vol. 1	—N/a	
August 8	Yes My Love	SM City North EDSA – Skydome	Quezon	YML Pulso	—N/a	
August 8	Dustin Yu, Bianca de Vera	New Frontier Theater	Quezon	Love, Actually...	—N/a	
August 9	AJAA	SM City North EDSA – Skydome	Quezon	Game Start	—N/a	
August 16	IV of Spades	Camp John Hay — Open Field	Baguio	Andalucia Tour	Originally scheduled on May 16.	
August 22	Ashtine Olviga	New Frontier Theater	Quezon	Love Like Ashtine	—N/a	
August 22	Kean Cipriano, Juris Fernandez, Duncan Ramos, Ice Seguerra, Sitti, Princess Velasco, Nyoy Volante	The Theatre at Solaire	Parañaque	Sessionistas: The Playlist	—N/a	
August 22	Angeline Quinto	Araneta Coliseum	Quezon	Aquinse	—N/a	
August 26	The Juans, dwta, Renz Verano, Pops Fernandez	Araneta Coliseum	Quezon	Wish Date: Unchanging Glass	Part of the Wish Date concert series.	
August 28–29	Yeng Constantino	Araneta Coliseum	Quezon	Biyaheng Bente	—N/a	
August 28–29	FILharmoniKA, Philippine Madrigal Singers	The Theatre at Solaire	Parañaque	Attack on Titan: Symphony from Paradis	—N/a	
August 30	SB19, 6cyclemind, Dionela, Earl Agustin, Hey June!, Fitterkarma, El Manu and Jessy Kang	Araneta Coliseum	Quezon	Acer Day 2026	—N/a	
September 3–20	Various from 9Works Theatrical (including Morissette)	Circuit Makati – Samsung Performing Arts Theater	Makati	The Notebook: The Musical	—N/a	
September 5–6	FILharmoniKA	The Theatre at Solaire	Parañaque	Star Wars: Return of the Jedi	Conducted by Gerard Salonga	
September 5	TJ Monterde, KZ Tandingan	SM Seaside Arena	Cebu	In Between: Philippine Tour	—N/a	
September 5	Teeth	SM City North EDSA – Skydome	Quezon	Teeth Reunion 2026: Legacy Tour	—N/a	
September 6 – November 8	REP Theater for Young Audiences	Eastwood Theater	Quezon	Cinderella: The Tale of the Glass Slipper	—N/a	
September 11–27	Various artists	Maybank Performing Arts Theater	Taguig	Muli – An OPM Musical	—N/a	
September 11–13	Ballet Philippines	The Theatre at Solaire	Parañaque	1001 Nights	—N/a	
September 11–12	Various artists	Green Sun Hotel	Makati	SONIK Philippines 2026	—N/a	
September 11	Teeth	Social Park Avenue	Cebu	Teeth Reunion 2026: Legacy Tour	—N/a	
September 12	Teeth	The Royal Mandaya Hotel	Davao	Teeth Reunion 2026: Legacy Tour	—N/a	
September 12	TJ Monterde, KZ Tandingan	Santa Rosa Multi-Purpose Complex	Santa Rosa	In Between: Philippine Tour	—N/a	
September 12	Jose Mari Chan, The Company	Music Museum	San Juan	Timeless Harmonies	—N/a	
September 12–27	Repertory Philippines	St. Scholastica's College, Manila – St. Cecilla Hall	Manila	A Midsummer Night's Dream	—N/a	
September 19	Pinoy Dream Academy contestants	Music Museum	San Juan	Pinoy Dream Academy: Alumni Homecoming	—N/a	
September 19	Fitterkarma	Metropolitan Theater	Manila	kung tayo'y nasa isang horror na pelikula, tiyak ako ang una mong papatayin - The Album Concert	Also featuring The Manila String Machine.	
September 19	Franco	Teatrino Promenade	San Juan	Franco: The Rebirth	—N/a	
September 20	Various artists	The Theatre at Solaire	Parañaque	Liyab: Mga Himig ng Dakilang Pag-ibig	—N/a	
September 20	Yeng Constantino	SM Seaside Arena	Cebu	Biyaheng Bente sa Cebu	—N/a	
September 20	Will Ashley	SM City North EDSA – Skydome	Quezon	Liham	—N/a	
September 24	Nina	Newport Performing Arts Theater	Pasay	Nina XX: The Anniversary Celebration The Repeat	—N/a	
September 25 – October 24	Atasha Muhlach, Sam Concepcion, KD Estrada, and others	Newport Performing Arts Theater	Pasay	Bongga Ka, 'Day!: The Annie Batungbakal Musical	—N/a	
September 25	Philippine Philharmonic Orchestra	Samsung Performing Arts Theater	Makati	PPO 42nd Concert Season I - Da Capo	—N/a	
September 25	Franco	Teatrino Promenade	San Juan	Franco: The Rebirth	—N/a	
September 26	Richard Reynoso	Teatrino Promenade	San Juan	Timeless Memories	—N/a	
October 1–31	Gary Valenciano	Music Museum	San Juan	Gary V. Back at The Museum	—N/a	
October 2	Ben&Ben	Araneta Coliseum	Quezon	Saranggola	—N/a	
October 3–4	FILharmoniKA	The Theatre at Solaire	Parañaque	Disney's Moana Live-to-Film Concert	—N/a	
October 4	Over October	New Frontier Theater	Quezon	LIVE at the New Frontier Theater	—N/a	
October 8	The Company, Neocolours	Newport Performing Arts Theater	Pasay	Pakisabi Na Lang, Tuloy Pa Rin	—N/a	
October 9	Myrus	Music Museum	San Juan	My Time	—N/a	
October 10	Janine Berdin	New Frontier Theater	Quezon	My First Concert Ever	Originally scheduled on October 7 but was rescheduled.	
October 10	Edgar Mortiz	Rockwell Center – Proscenium Theater	Makati	Goin' Standard	—N/a	
October 11	Barbie Almalbis, Kitchie Nadal	SM Center Shaw – Matchpoint Sports Bar & Events	Mandaluyong	CROSSFADE: Kitchie Nadal x Barbie Almalbis	—N/a	
October 16	Philippine Philharmonic Orchestra	Circuit Makati – Samsung Performing Arts Theater	Makati	PPO 42nd Concert Season II – Elegance	Conducted by Grzegorz Nowak	
October 17	FILharmoniKA	Rockwell Center – Proscenium Theater	Makati	Undertale: The Determination Harmony	—N/a	
October 17–18	Regine Velasquez	SM Mall of Asia Arena	Pasay	FINALE. The Final Major Solo Concert	—N/a	
October 18	Angela Ken	New Frontier Theater	Quezon	Panahon Na Natin	With special guests Aia de Leon and Adie	
October 23	Viva Hot Babes	New Frontier Theater	Quezon	Bulaklak: The Viva HotBabes Reunion	—N/a	
October 24	I Belong to the Zoo	New Frontier Theater	Quezon	The First Major Concert	With special guests Barbie Almalbis, Janine Teñoso, Clara Benin, and Reese Lansangan.	
October 24–25	Silent Sanctuary	SM Mall of Asia Arena	Pasay	Gabi ng Lambing	With special guest, Manila Symphony Orchestra	
October 29	Gary Valenciano	Music Museum	San Juan, Metro Manila	Back at the Museum	—N/a	
November 6–7	Ice Seguerra	Music Museum	San Juan, Metro Manila	Ice Sings! An Intimate Concert Series	—N/a	
November 6	Philippine Philharmonic Orchestra	Circuit Makati – Samsung Performing Arts Theater	Makati	PPO 42nd Concert Season III – Boléro	Conducted by Grzegorz Nowak	
November 7	Yeng Constantino	SM Lanang – SMX Convention Center	Davao	Biyaheng Bente sa Davao	—N/a	
November 7	SexBomb Girls	University of Southeastern Philippines – Gymnasium	Davao	Get, Get, Aw!: The SexBomb Concert	—N/a	
November 8	Alamat	New Frontier Theater	Quezon	ALX: Alamat The Legendary Experience	—N/a	
November 13	Randy Santiago	Eton Centris – The Elements	Quezon	Behind the Shades: 40th Anniversary Concert	—N/a	
November 14	Basil Valdez	Maybank Performing Arts Theater	Makati	Salamin ng Buhay: Basil Valdez at 75	—N/a	
November 17–18	Yeng Constantino	Araneta Coliseum	Quezon	Biyaheng Bente	—N/a	
November 20	Yeng Constantino	Limketkai Center – Atrium	Cagayan de Oro	Biyaheng Bente	With special guests Sam Milby, Jason Dy, and Jay R	
November 21	Raymond Lauchengco	Circuit Makati – Samsung Performing Arts Theater	Makati	We Built This City	—N/a	
November 21	Apartel, The Itchyworms, Ena Mori, Alyson, Pinkmen, Ligaya Escueta, Neytan, Sexy Jay, Carousel Casualties	Mandala Park – 123 Block	Mandaluyong	Offshore Music Turns 10: A Decade of Good Noise	—N/a	
November 26	Pops Fernandez	Newport Performing Arts Theater	Pasay	Pops Live!	—N/a	
November 26	Various local Christian artists	SM City North EDSA – Skydome	Quezon	Undivided: One Voice, One Worship, One Savior.	With special guest Ogie Alcasid	
November 28	Sud	SM Aura – Samsung Hall	Taguig	This Is How We Play: 15 Years of Sud	—N/a	
November 28	FILharmoniKA	Newport Performing Arts Theater	Pasay	Jujutsu Kaisen in Concert	With special guest Sofia Abrogar.	
November 29	FILharmoniKA	Newport Performing Arts Theater	Pasay	Jujutsu Kaisen in Concert	With special guest Sofia Abrogar.	
November 29	Marielle Montellano	New Frontier Theater	Quezon	Marielle: Most Requested	—N/a	
November 29	Yeng Constantino	University of Baguio	Baguio	Biyaheng Bente	With special guests: Kyle Echarri, Zephanie and Michael Sager.	
December 3–4	Cup of Joe	Araneta Coliseum	Quezon	Symphony: Live at the Big Dome	This will be the band's final major concert before hiatus. With special guests: Orchestra of the Filipino Youth, Ebe Dancel, Mariah Deborah, Wilbert Ross and Vice Ganda.	
December 4	Yeng Constantino	Sta. Rosa Multipurpose Complex	Santa Rosa	Biyaheng Bente	—N/a	
December 11–13	Ballet Manila, Steps Dance Studio	Samsung Performing Arts Theater	Makati	The Nutcracker	—N/a	
December 11	SexBomb Girls	SM Seaside Arena	Cebu	Get, Get, Aw!: The SexBomb Concert	—N/a	
December 11	Leanne & Naara	Mandala Park – 123 Block	Mandaluyong	Leanne & Naara… Again (The 10th Anniversary Concert)	—N/a	
December 11	Richard Reynoso	Teatrino Promenade	San Juan	Timeless Memories – The Repeat	—N/a	
December 12	Ogie Alcasid, APO Hiking Society, Jose Mari Chan, The Company, Martin Nievera, Ariel Rivera, Sofronio Vasquez	Newport Performing Arts Theater	Pasay	Jose Mari Chan: A Christmas with the OPM Icons	—N/a	
December 16	Ice Seguerra, Sitti, Princess Velasco, Nyoy Volante, Bituin Escalante	Newport Performing Arts Theater	Pasay	Ice Seguerra and Friends! – Videoke Hits: Christmas Edition	—N/a	
December 18	Adie	New Frontier Theater	Quezon	Himig ng Tadhana	—N/a	
December 18	Shean	Music Museum	San Juan	Pagibig sa Sama ng Panahon	—N/a	
December 19	Yeng Constantino	AATF Sports Complex	Imus	Biyaheng Bente	With special guests Sam Milby and Kyla	
December 19–20	FILharmoniKA, Philippine Madrigal Singers	The Theatre at Solaire	Parañaque	Home Alone in Concert	—N/a	

=== International artists ===
Date(s)	Headliner(s)	Venue	City	Event / Tour	Note(s)	Ref.
January 1–4	Various	SM Mall of Asia Arena	Pasay	Disney on Ice: Magic in the Stars	—N/a	
January 11	Air Supply	City of Passi Arena	Passi	Air Supply 50th Anniversary	—N/a	
January 17	Colde	Music Museum	San Juan	Blueprint+	—N/a	
January 17	Riize	SM Mall of Asia Arena	Pasay	Riizing Loud	—N/a	
January 17	Wendy	New Frontier Theater	Quezon	W:ealive	—N/a	
January 18	Israel Houghton	SM Mall of Asia Arena	Pasay	Israel & New Breed	—N/a	
January 19	Israel Houghton	IC3 Convention Center	Cebu	Israel & New Breed	—N/a	
January 19	Fly By Midnight	Music Museum	San Juan	The Fastest Time of Our Lives	—N/a	
January 20 – March 1	Various	The Theatre at Solaire	Parañaque	Les Misérables World Tour Spectacular Tour	Produced by Cameron Mackintosh	
January 23	Jay	Music Museum	San Juan	Jay 207: Asia Tour	—N/a	
January 24	Day6	SM Mall of Asia Arena	Pasay	The Decade	—N/a	
January 24	Air Supply	Jose Rizal Coliseum	Calamba	Air Supply 50th Anniversary	—N/a	
January 27	The Lumineers	New Frontier Theater	Quezon	The Automatic World Tour	—N/a	
January 27	Air Supply	Waterfront Hotel & Casino	Cebu	Air Supply 50th Anniversary	—N/a	
January 28	Wisp	SM City North EDSA – Skydome	Quezon	If Not Winter Tour	With special guest Tilapayaso	
January 30	Lang Lang	Rockwell Center – Proscenium Theater	Makati	Lang Lang Live!	—N/a	
January 31	Bryan Adams	SM Mall of Asia Arena	Pasay	Roll With the Punches	—N/a	
January 31	Jonas Blue	The Palace Manila – Xylo	Taguig	The Grand Finale	Featuring DJs Martin Pulgar, Ace Ramos, Marc Naval, and Kat DJ	
February 1	Men I Trust	Filinvest Tent	Muntinlupa	Equus	With special guest Fitterkarma	
February 3	Samm Henshaw	Teatrino Promenade	San Juan	It Could Be Worse	—N/a	
February 4	Giveon	New Frontier Theater	Quezon	Dear Beloved	—N/a	
February 12	Underoath	SM City North EDSA – Skydome	Quezon	Underoath Live!	—N/a	
February 17	Suicide Silence	SM City North EDSA – Skydome	Quezon	Suicide Silence Live!	—N/a	
February 18	Josh Groban	SM Mall of Asia Arena	Pasay	Gems World Tour	With special guests Martin Nievera and Regine Velasquez, and a guest appearance from Julie Anne San Jose	
February 20	The Calling	Waterfront Hotel & Casino	Cebu	Before The World Turns to Dust	—N/a	
February 21	Kim Se-jeong	New Frontier Theater	Quezon	Tenth Letter	—N/a	
February 21	The Calling	SM Lanang – SMX Convention Center	Davao	Before The World Turns to Dust	—N/a	
February 22	The Calling	SM City Bacolod – SMX Convention Center	Bacolod	Before The World Turns to Dust	—N/a	
February 24	The Calling	Metrotent Convention Center	Pasig	Before The World Turns to Dust	—N/a	
February 28	Chen	EVM Convention Center	Quezon	Arcadia	—N/a	
March 3	Chicago Funk, The Ritchie Experience	Newport Performing Arts Theater	Pasay	Earth, Wind & Fire and The Ritchie Experience	—N/a	
March 4	One Ok Rock	SM Mall of Asia Arena	Pasay	Detox: Asia Tour 2025	—N/a	
March 8	Peabo Bryson	The Theatre at Solaire	Parañaque	The Golden Touch Tour	—N/a	
March 8	Tomorrow X Together	SM Mall of Asia Arena	Pasay	Wonders at 553	—N/a	
March 14	NCT Wish	New Frontier Theater	Quezon	Into The Wish: Our Wish	—N/a	
March 14	Ateez	Smart Araneta Coliseum	Quezon	In Your Fantasy	—N/a	
March 16	Central Cee	New Frontier Theater	Quezon	Can't Rush Greatness World Tour	Originally planned to take place at the Smart Araneta Coliseum, but was moved to the nearby New Frontier Theater for undisclosed reasons	
March 19	Brian McKnight	Limketkai Center – Atrium	Cagayan de Oro	So In Love	—N/a	
March 21	Seventeen	Philippine Sports Stadium	Bocaue	New_ World Tour	—N/a	
March 21	Brian McKnight	SM Lanang – SMX Convention Center	Davao	So In Love	—N/a	
March 21–22	Bethel Music	SM Mall of Asia Arena	Pasay	Bethel Music 2026 Tour	—N/a	
March 22	Kino	SM City North EDSA – Skydome	Quezon	Free Kino	—N/a	
March 22	Brian McKnight	Waterfront Hotel & Casino	Cebu	So In Love	—N/a	
March 27–28	Various	City of Dreams – Grand Ballroom	Parañaque	The Golden Sound of The Platters	—N/a	
April 7	Rick Price	Newport Performing Arts Theater	Pasay	For Lovers Concert Tour	—N/a	
April 18	Treasure	SM Mall of Asia Arena	Pasay	Pulse On	—N/a	
April 24	Per Oystein Sorensen	SM City Bacolod – SMX Convention Center	Bacolod	The Voice of Fra Lippo Lippi: Per Sorensen Live	—N/a	
April 25	Ive	SM Mall of Asia Arena	Pasay	Show What I Am World Tour	—N/a	
April 25	Xlov	UP Theater	Quezon	Xlov Asia Tour	—N/a	
April 30	Per Oystein Sorensen	University of Southeastern Philippines	Davao	The Voice of Fra Lippo Lippi: Per Sorensen Live	—N/a	
May 2	Sienna Spiro	Maybank Performing Arts Theater	Taguig	Sienna Spiro Live	—N/a	
May 2	Woodz	New Frontier Theater	Quezon	Archive. 1	—N/a	
May 2–24	Various	The Theatre at Solaire	Parañaque	Jesus Christ Superstar	—N/a	
May 4	Saosin	SM Seaside City – Skyhall	Cebu	Saosin Live	—N/a	
May 5	A Skylit Drive	Aster Events Place	Mandaluyong	A Skylit Drive Live!	—N/a	
May 6	Hawthorne Heights	SM City North EDSA – Skydome	Quezon	Lonely World Tour	—N/a	
May 7	Saosin	SM City North EDSA – Skydome	Quezon	Saosin Live	—N/a	
May 7	Taya	Smart Araneta Coliseum	Quezon	A Night of Worship	—N/a	
May 10	Apink	UP Theater	Quezon	Apink Asia Tour	—N/a	
May 10	Pixies	Filinvest Tent	Muntinlupa	Pixies: 40th Anniversary Tour	—N/a	
May 16	Jessica Sanchez	Araneta Coliseum	Quezon	Jessica Sanchez Live	With special guests Gary Valenciano, Regine Velasquez, Martin Nievera, Morissette, and James Reid. Vice Ganda was also originally part of the guests lineup but withdrew at the last minute.	
May 19	Jeff Mills	SM Aura – Samsung Hall	Taguig	Jeff Mills Live at the Liquid Room Mix: 30th Anniversary Tour	—N/a	
May 19	Vertical Horizon	SM City North EDSA – Skydome	Quezon	Vertical Horizon Live!	—N/a	
May 19–21	Daniel Caesar	SM Mall of Asia Arena	Pasay	Son of Spergy Tour	—N/a	
May 20	Vertical Horizon	SM Lanang – SMX Convention Center	Davao	Vertical Horizon Live!	—N/a	
May 21	Hiatus Kaiyote	Filinvest Tent	Muntinlupa	Karpos Live: Hiatus Kaiyote	—N/a	
May 24	BUS	New Frontier Theater	Quezon	BUS the 1st Asia Fancon Tour: The First Light	—N/a	
May 26–28	Laufey	SM Mall of Asia Arena	Pasay	A Matter of Time Tour	Bini made an unannounced guest appearance on May 27	
May 28	Jenevieve	SM Aura – Samsung Hall	Taguig	The Crysalis Tour	Part of the Insignia Concert Series; with Blessing Jolie as the opening act	
May 30	JID	The Podium Hall	Mandaluyong	God Does Like	—N/a	
June 2	Ella Mai	New Frontier Theater	Quezon	Do You Still Love Me?	—N/a	
June 23	Wasia Project	Teatrino Promenade	San Juan	Wasia Project Piano Shows	—N/a	
June 27	F4, Ashin	Philippine Arena	Bocaue	F★Forever	—N/a	
June 27	Kim Sung-kyu	UP Theater	Quezon	LV4: Leap to Vector	—N/a	
June 27	Music Travel Love	Waterfront Hotel & Casino	Cebu	Music Travel Love: Philippine Tour	—N/a	
June 28	Music Travel Love	New Frontier Theater	Quezon	Music Travel Love: Philippine Tour	—N/a	
July 4–5	Exo	SM Mall of Asia Arena	Pasay	Exo Planet 6 – Exhorizon	—N/a	
July 5	iKon	SMX Convention Center	Pasay	Fourever Tour	—N/a	
July 10 – August 2	Various	Rockwell Center – Proscenium Theater	Makati	On Your Feet!	—N/a	
July 11	Itzy	SM Mall of Asia Arena	Pasay	Tunnel Vision	—N/a	
July 14	Mitski	SM Mall of Asia Arena	Pasay	Nothing's About to Happen to Me Live 2026	—N/a	
July 15	Daya	SM City North EDSA – Skydome	Quezon	Til Every Petal Drops Tour	—N/a	
July 17	Lullaboy	Teatrino Promenade	San Juan	Tunnel Vision	—N/a	
July 17–19	Planetshakers, planetboom	SM Mall of Asia Arena	Pasay	Live In Manila 2026	—N/a	
July 18	Jung Il-hoon	SM City North EDSA – Skydome	Quezon	1-Day Art Class	—N/a	
July 22	XG	SM Mall of Asia Arena	Pasay	The Core World Tour	—N/a	
July 25–26	AHOF	SM Mall of Asia Arena	Pasay	The 1st Spark in Manila	—N/a	
July 27	Ifeye	Music Museum	San Juan	If I	—N/a	
July 30–31	Mateus Asato	Aster Events Place	Mandaluyong	Mateus Asato Live in Manila	—N/a	
August 7	Björn Again	Waterfront Hotel & Casino	Cebu	Björn Again: ABBA Forever	—N/a	
August 8	Mamamoo	Araneta Coliseum	Quezon	Mamamoo 2026 World Tour	—N/a	
August 8	Björn Again	The Theater at Solaire	Parañaque	Björn Again: ABBA Forever	—N/a	
August 9	Björn Again	The Theater at Solaire	Parañaque	Björn Again: ABBA Forever	—N/a	
August 9	Daniel Seavey, Emei	One Ayala	Makati	Daniel Seavey and Emei in Manila	—N/a	
August 10	Kodaline	SM Mall of Asia Arena	Pasay	Farewell Tour	—N/a	
August 10–12	Honne	Philippine International Convention Center – Plenary Hall	Pasay	Honne: 10th Year Anniversary Tour	—N/a	
August 11	Lee Hi	New Frontier Theater	Quezon	Lee Hi and 808 Hi Recordings World Tour	—N/a	
August 12	Various artists	Araneta Coliseum	Quezon	Toast: The Best of Bread	With special guest Noel Cabangon	
August 15	Various artists	Waterfront Hotel & Casino	Cebu	Toast: The Best of Bread	With special guest Noel Cabangon	
August 15	The Rose	SM Mall of Asia Arena	Pasay	Rosetopia Asia Tour	—N/a	
August 20	Rex Orange County	SM Mall of Asia Arena	Pasay	Rex Orange County: Exclusive Asia Show	Part of LaLaLa Fest Manila showcase. With special guest openers Maki and Over October.	
August 21	Everglow	New Frontier Theater	Quezon	Everglow World Tour: Re:Code	—N/a	
September 3–4	John Legend	Rockwell Center – Proscenium Theater	Makati	An Evening of Songs & Stories	—N/a	
September 5	Babymonster	SM Mall of Asia Arena	Pasay	Choom World Tour	—N/a	
September 15	Clair Marlo, Rick Price	The Theatre at Solaire	Parañaque	Clair Marlo X Rick Price	—N/a	
September 20	STAYC	UP Theater	Quezon	Stay Closer	—N/a	
September 25	Engelbert Humperdinck	New Frontier Theater	Quezon	The Legend Continues... The Celebration Tour 2026	—N/a	
October 3	Be First	New Frontier Theater	Quezon	Be:First World Showcase	—N/a	
October 14	Charlie Puth	SM Mall of Asia Arena	Pasay	Whatever's Clever! World Tour	—N/a	
October 15	Prep	Filinvest Tent	Muntinlupa	Asia Tour 2026	Part of the Karpos Live series	
October 16–25	Various	The Theatre at Solaire	Parañaque	Cirque Alice	—N/a	
October 16	A1	Waterfront Hotel & Casino	Cebu	Love in the Philippines Tour	—N/a	
October 17	A1	New Frontier Theater	Quezon	Love in the Philippines Tour	—N/a	
October 17	J. R. Richards	Social Park Avenue	Cebu	Counting Blue Nights	—N/a	
October 17	Louis Tomlinson	Smart Araneta Coliseum	Quezon	How Did We Get Here? World Tour	—N/a	
October 20	Flow	SM City North EDSA – Skydome	Quezon	Naruto The Rock	—N/a	
October 26	Air Supply	Araneta Coliseum	Quezon	A Matter of Time Tour	—N/a	
October 27	Jason Mraz	SM Mall of Asia Arena	Pasay	Asia 2026 Tour	—N/a	
October 30	Zara Larsson	Smart Araneta Coliseum	Quezon	Midnight Sun Tour	—N/a	
October 31	Israel Houghton	The Theatre at Solaire	Parañaque	Israel & New Breed: 'Til the Whole World Knows Tour 2026	Originally planned to take place at the Cuneta Astrodome	
November 6–22	Various	The Theatre at Solaire	Parañaque	The Play That Goes Wrong	—N/a	
November 6	LANY	SM Seaside Arena	Cebu	Soft by LANY: The World Tour	Also featuring Culture Wars and Maisy Kay as opening acts.	
November 7–8	LANY	Philippine Arena	Bocaue	Soft by LANY: The World Tour	Moira Dela Torre made an unannounced guest appearance on November 7. Also featuring Culture Wars and Maisy Kay as opening acts.	
November 9	Yung Kai	New Frontier Theater	Quezon	Stay With the Ocean, I'll Find You	—N/a	
November 9	Yves	Filinvest Tent	Muntinlupa	Yves Tour 2026	Part of the Karpos Live series	
November 11–12	5 Seconds of Summer	SM Mall of Asia Arena	Pasay	Everyone's a Star! World Tour	—N/a	
November 14	My Chemical Romance	Philippine Arena	Bocaue	The Black Parade 2026	Originally scheduled on April 25, but moved for undisclosed reasons	
November 14	Milena	Aster Events Place	Mandaluyong	Milena Live in Manila	—N/a	
November 15	Wave to Earth	SM Mall of Asia Arena	Pasay	The () Pieces Tour	—N/a	
November 20	Kings of Convenience	Newport Performing Arts Theater	Pasay	Kings of Convenience Live in Manila	Originally planned to take place at the Philippine International Convention Center – Plenary Hall	
November 25	Simple Plan	Araneta Coliseum	Quezon	The Bigger Than You Think	—N/a	
November 27	Stephen Speaks	Teatrino Promenade	San Juan	Right On Time	—N/a	
November 27	Jonah Marais, Jack Avery, and Zach Herron	SM Aura – Samsung Hall	Taguig	Why Can't We: Live in Manila	—N/a	
November 28 – December 6	Various	SM Seaside Arena	Cebu	Disney on Ice: Let's Dance!	—N/a	
November 29	5 Seconds of Summer	SM Mall of Asia Arena	Pasay	Everyone's a Star! World Tour	—N/a	
December 5	Le Sserafim	SM Mall of Asia Arena	Pasay	Pureflow Tour	A second show on December 6 was initially scheduled with tickets having been sold, but was canceled for undisclosed reasons with ticketholders either reassigned to the first show on December 5 or refunded.	
December 12	NCT 127	SM Mall of Asia Arena	Pasay	Neo City – The Redline	—N/a	
December 18–30	Various	SM Mall of Asia Arena	Pasay	Disney on Ice: Let's Dance!	—N/a	
December 13	Kavana	New Frontier Theater	Quezon	Second Act: Asia Tour	—N/a	
December 13	Stephen Speaks	Social Park Avenue	Cebu	Right On Time	—N/a	
December 16	Afrojack	SMX Convention Center	Pasay	AFROJACK Live in Manila	—N/a	

=== Music festivals ===
Date(s)	Event	Venue	City	Notable performers	Note(s)	Ref.
January 17	Coke Studio @ Sinulog 2026	SM Seaside City Concert Grounds	Cebu	TJ Monterde; The Juans	—N/a	
January 17–18	BingoPlus Musikalingawan sa Sinulog 2026	Plaza Independencia	Cebu	Hey June!; Jed Madela; Sheryn Regis; Jona	—N/a	
January 17–18	Hiraya Music Festival	Clark Global City – Concert Grounds	Angeles	Earl Agustin; Bandang Lapis; Rob Deniel; Dionela; Flow G; IV of Spades; Juan Karlos; Amiel Sol; SunKissed Lola	—N/a	
January 18	G Music Fest at the Sinulog Festival	Ayala Center Cebu	Cebu	Mayonnaise	Part of the G Music Fest series by Globe Telecom	
January 31	Circus Music Festival 7	Bridgetowne – Concert Grounds	Pasig	Earl Agustin; Angela Ken; Bandang Lapis; Rico Blanco; Cup of Joe; December Avenue; Flow G; Hale; Maki; Mayonnaise; Rob Deniel; Shanti Dope; Skusta Clee; Soapdish; Sponge Cola; Sud; Janine Teñoso	Part of the Circus Music Festival series. Silent Sanctuary was unable to perform their set time due to a strictly-implemented curfew imposed by the Pasig local government.	
February 7–8	Wonderful Moments Music Festival	SMDC Concert Grounds	Parañaque	Adie; Earl Agustin; Alamat; Ely Buendia; Bamboo; Bini; Cup of Joe; Denise Julia; Dionela; Sarah Geronimo; Gloc-9; Kamikazee; Arthur Nery; Parokya ni Edgar; Amiel Sol	Originally scheduled on December 6–7, 2025 but later moved after reevaluation.	
March 7–8	Lubao International Balloon and Music Festival	Pradera Verde	Lubao	Bamboo; Rico Blanco; December Avenue; Dionela; Flow G; Hev Abi; IV of Spades; Kamikazee; Maki; Arthur Nery; Parokya ni Edgar	—N/a	
April 15–18	UP Fair 2026	University of the Philippines Diliman – Sunken Garden	Quezon	Earl Agustin; Apl.de.ap; Apo Hiking Society; Clara Benin; The Bloomfields; Arizona Brandy; Rob Deniel; Fitterkarma; Gracenote; Ron Henley; Hev Abi; Hey June!; Imago; Kiyo; Lola Amour; Loonie; Maki; Mayonnaise; Moonstar88; Morissette; Orange and Lemons; Over October; The Ridleys; Soapdish; Amiel Sol; Sponge Cola; Marina Summers; The Vowels They Orbit; This Band; Toneejay	The aggregated event for the 2026 edition is divided into 4 events: Kalye Tunes (Wednesday, April 15); Quests (Thursday, April 16); Elements (Friday, April 17); REV Music Festival (Saturday, April 18)	
April 17, 19	All of the Noise 2026	Sari-Sari Bar	Makati	Elijah Canlas; Fitterkarma; Grrrl Gang; One Click Straight; Phoebe Rings; Shye; SOS; BP Valenzuela; Vvink	—N/a	
April 18	All of the Noise 2026	Mandala Park – 123 Block	Mandaluyong	Elijah Canlas; Fitterkarma; Grrrl Gang; One Click Straight; Phoebe Rings; Shye; SOS; BP Valenzuela; Vvink	—N/a	
April 18–19	ASEAN-Korea Music Festival "Round 2026"	Araneta Coliseum	Quezon	Hori7on; Cup of Joe; Ben&Ben; TJ Monterde; Syafiq Abdillah; G-Devith; Pamungkas; Regina Song; Tilly Birds; 10cm; MeloMance	—N/a	
April 25	Castaway Music Festival 2026	SM City Pampanga	San Fernando	Dilaw; Maki; Typecast	Part of the annual Castaway Music Festival series by SM Malls.	
May 1	Takeover Beach Music Festival	Boracay – Station 1	Malay	Apl.de.ap; Gloc-9; Loonie; Nik Makino; Shanti Dope	—N/a	
May 2–3	Aurora Music Festival - Clark	Clark Global City	Angeles	Ben&Ben; December Avenue; Sarah Geronimo; IV of Spades; Kamikazee; Armi Millare; Kitchie Nadal; Parokya Ni Edgar; SB19; SexBomb Girls	Part of the Aurora Music Festival series.	
May 8	Playback Music Festival	SM Mall of Asia Arena	Pasay	Dashboard Confessional; Faber Drive; Red Jumpsuit Apparatus	—N/a	
May 9	Playback Music Festival	Waterfront Cebu City Hotel & Casino	Cebu	Dashboard Confessional; Faber Drive; Red Jumpsuit Apparatus	—N/a	
May 9	Circus Music Festival 8	Parklinks – Concert Grounds	Pasig	Cueshé; Ebe Dancel; Dionela; Fitterkarma; Kamikazee; I Belong to the Zoo; IV of Spades; Maki; Armi Millare; TJ Monterde; Ena Mori; One Click Straight; Parokya ni Edgar; Wilbert Ross; Silent Sanctuary; Sugarcane; KZ Tandingan; The Juans	Part of the Circus Music Festival series.	
May 16	Howlers Manila 4.0	Aseana City – Concert Grounds	Parañaque	Bamboo; December Avenue; Gloc-9	—N/a	
May 17	Sonata Bisaya Music Festival	Ayala Center Cebu	Cebu	South Border; Wilbert Ross	—N/a	
May 18	Sonata Bisaya Music Festival	Ayala Malls Central Bloc	Cebu	South Border; Wilbert Ross	—N/a	
May 23	Summer in the Sky	SM Mall of Asia – MOA Sky	Pasay	Adie; Ben&Ben	—N/a	
May 23	Malasimbo Music and Arts Festival 2026	Puerta Real Gardens	Manila	Seun Kuti; Julian Marley	—N/a	
June 19–20	AndFriends Festival	Okada Manila	Parañaque	Galantis; Porter Robinson	—N/a	
June 20	Fête de la Musique Philippines 2026	Ayala Triangle Gardens	Makati	Fitterkarma; Lola Amour; Radioactive Sago Project	—N/a	
June 20–28	Fête de la Musique Philippines 2026	Various venues across the Philippines		Various artists	Pocket stages in various venues	
June 26	Fusion: The Philippine Music Festival	Filinvest City Event Grounds	Muntinlupa	Earl Agustin; BGYO; IV of Spades; Angela Ken; Maki; Arthur Miguel	—N/a	
June 27	LOVE LABAN 4: 2026 Pride March and Festival	University of the Philippines Diliman – Sunken Garden	Quezon	Various artists	—N/a	
August 7–8	Tribal Ink: Art & Music Festival	World Trade Center Metro Manila	Pasay	Chicosci; Dionela; Gloc-9; Greyhoundz; Mayonnaise; Sandwich; Silent Sanctuary; Typecast; Urbandub	—N/a	
August 16	G Music Fest at the Kadayawan Festival	Ayala Malls Abreeza	Davao	The Itchyworms	Part of the G Music Fest series by Globe Telecom	
August 21	LaLaLa Fest – Manila	World Trade Center Metro Manila	Pasay	Ben&Ben; Dilaw; Fitterkarma; Flo; Dermot Kennedy; Steve Lacy; Maki; Over October; Isyana Sarasvati; Two Door Cinema Club	Also part of Two Door Cinema Club's Tourist History 15th Anniversary Tour.	
September 4	September Fever 2026	Atua Midtown	Cebu	Shye	—N/a	
September 5–6	September Fever 2026	The Kabilin Center	Cebu	Shye	—N/a	
September 26	Navotas Music Fest	Navotas Convention Center	Navotas	Cup of Joe; Kaia; Mayonnaise; Maki	—N/a	
October 9–10	Hiraya Music Festival	Kwiky Mart Open Grounds	General Santos	December Avenue; Fitterkarma; Flow G; Ylona Garcia; Parokya ni Edgar; Skusta Clee	Not to be confused with the same festival event.	
October 16–17	LYVE Festival	The Upper East	Bacolod	Iyaz; Kiyo	Part of MassKara Festival.	
November 21	Circus Music Festival 9	Bridgetowne – Concert Grounds	Pasig	Earl Agustin; Al James; Cup of Joe; December Avenue; Fitterkarma; Flow G; Angela Ken; Mariah Deborah; Arthur Nery; Orange and Lemons; Skusta Clee; Silent Sanctuary; The Juans	Part of the Circus Music Festival series.	
November 27–29	Takeover Fest La Union	Poro Point Baywalk	San Fernando	Dionela; Fitterkarma; Gloc-9; Hagibis; Mike Hanopol; Hey June!; Hilera; Kamikazee; Loonie; Mayonnaise; Stephen Speaks	—N/a	
November 28	Harana: Acoustic Music Festival	Filinvest City Event Grounds	Muntinlupa	Earl Agustin; Clara Benin; Rob Deniel; Syd Hartha; Angela Ken; Maki; Mariah Deborah; TJ Monterde; Arthur Nery; Toneejay	—N/a	
November 28	PLUS63 Music and Arts Festival – Manila	Aseana City – Concert Grounds	Parañaque	Cash Cash; Khalid; Kiana Valenciano; Wolf Alice	—N/a	
December 19	Maskipaps: the Crossover 2026	Sunken Garden, University of the Philippines Diliman	Quezon	Angela Ken; Any Name's Okay; Dilaw; Esremborak; Fitterkarma; Kamikazee; Lola Amour; Mariah Deborah; Silent Sanctuary; Skusta Clee; Typecast	—N/a	
TBA	Eraserheads Electric Fun Festival	SMDC Concert Grounds	Parañaque	Dong Abay; Basti Artadi; Eraserheads; General Luna; Imago; The Itchyworms; Moonstar88; Blaster Silonga	Originally scheduled on May 31, 2025, then October 18, 2025, but later postponed.	

=== New Year's Eve events (December 31) ===
Event	Venue	City	Headliner(s)	Note(s)	Ref(s)
VOIC3S: A New Year's Eve Special	Solaire Resort	Parañaque	Jed Madela; Martin Nievera; Sofronio Vasquez	—N/a	
New Year CountDance to 2027	Solaire Resort	Quezon	Jona; Lani Misalucha	—N/a	
The Grand Countdown to 2027	Newport World Resorts – Marriott Grand Ballroom	Pasay	Yeng Constantino; KZ Tandingan; Gary Valenciano	—N/a	

=== Cancelled/postponed shows ===
Scheduled date(s)	Headliner(s)	Venue	City	Event / Tour	Reason for cancellation	Ref.
February 18	Cavetown	SM City North EDSA – Skydome	Quezon City	Running with Scissors Tour	Unforeseen issues with the venue	
April 26–27	Vienna Boys' Choir	Newport Performing Arts Theater	Pasay	Vienna Boys' Choir Live	Unforeseen circumstances	
August 2	IV of Spades, Arvery Love Lagoring, Kolette Madelo, Kai Montinola, Christian Tibayan	SM Mall of Asia Arena	Pasay	Ikalawang Yugto: Buhay at Pag-ibig	Unforeseen circumstances. Originally scheduled on March 27 at the Philippine International Convention Center – Plenary Hall, but later rescheduled and moved to a new venue due to unforeseen circumstances.	
August 8	Momoland	EVM Convention Center	Quezon	Very Merry 10th Anniversary	Unforeseen circumstances	
August 25	The Click Five	New Frontier Theater	Quezon	For Lovers Tour	Unforeseen circumstances	
August 27	The Click Five	Waterfront Cebu City Hotel & Casino	Cebu	For Lovers Tour	Unforeseen circumstances	
September 5	The Click Five	University of Southeastern Philippines	Davao	For Lovers Tour	Unforeseen circumstances	
September 29	Post Malone	Philippine Arena	Bocaue	Big Ass Stadium Tour Part 2	Unknown. Postponed to a later date.	
October 1	Bic Runga	SM City North EDSA – Skydome	Quezon	Sway: Bic Runga Live in Manila	Unforeseen circumstances	
October 4	Moira Dela Torre	SM Mall of Asia Arena	Pasay	Where It All Started	Unknown. Postponed to 2027.	
October 26	0WAVE	Teatrino Promenade	San Juan	0WAVE Live In Manila	Unforeseen circumstances. Postponed to a later date.	
November 12	LANY	SM Seaside Arena	Cebu	Soft by LANY: The World Tour	Safety issues regarding the roofing of the venue. It was labeled postponed but now canceled.	
November 14	LANY	Crocodile Park Concert Grounds	Davao	Soft by LANY: The World Tour	Safety concerns and production issues	

== Deaths ==
- May 31 – Aly Pagaduan (b. 1997), singer and vocalist (Sleep Alley)
- June 8 – Bing Austria (b. 1964), musician and multi-instrumentalist (Put3ska, Tropical Depression, Juan Pablo Dream)
