= Sugarcane (disambiguation) =

Sugarcane is a species of grass used in sugar production.

Sugarcane or sugar cane may also refer to:

- Don "Sugarcane" Harris (1938–1999), American blues and rock and roll violinist and guitarist
- Williams Lake Indian Reserve No. 1, a First Nations reserve in British Columbia, Canada also known as "Sugarcane"
- Sugarcane (Filipino band), a six-member rock music band
- Sugarcane (film), a 2024 documentary film featuring William Lakes Indian Reserve No. 1
- Sugarcane (Camidoh song), a 2021 song by Camidoh
- Sugarcane (EP), a 2017 extended play by Tiwa Savage
- Sugarcane (New Order song), a 2013 song by New Order
- Sugar Cane (1786 ship), a British three-decker ship
- The Sugar Cane, 1764 poem
