= Sugarcane (Filipino band) =

Filipino alternative folk/pop band

- Origin: Marikina, Philippines
- Genres: Indie pop; Alternative folk; Folk pop
- Years active: 2019–present
- Labels: Warner Philippines
- Members: Cedric Angeles; Carl Guerzon; Frain Reyes; Luis Beato; Rona Tiñola; Froilan Bautista

Sugarcane (stylized in uppercase) is a Filipino folk-pop and alternative rock band from Metro Manila, Philippines. The band is composed of six members: Cedric Angeles (vocals/guitar), Carl Guerzon (vocals/bass), Frain Reyes (lead guitar), Luis Beato (keyboard), Rona Tiñola (flute), and Froilan Bautista (drums).

Initially gaining fame for viral song covers, they have since transitioned into an established OPM band known for their viral signature hit "Leonora" in 2023.

== History ==
The band started out in 2019 with their debut single "Bituin".

In 2023, the band released its new single "Leonora", a rendition on classic Philippine folk music. The song became a viral hit on Spotify's local charts.

In 2025, the band released its debut EP Memory, a 6-track list featuring a collaboration song with The Ridleys.

== Band members ==
- Cedric Angeles - vocals/guitar
- Carl Guerzon - vocals/bass
- Frain Reyes - lead guitar
- Luis Beato - keyboard
- Rona Tiñola - flute
- Froilan Bautista - drums

== Discography ==
=== Extended plays ===
- Memory (2025)

=== Singles ===
- "Bituin" (2019)
- "Kung Maging Akin Ka" (2021)
- "Leonora" (2023)
- "Sinehan" (2023)
- "Maria Clara" (2024)
- "Aking Maria Clara" (featuring Jikamarie) (2024)
- "Memory" (featuring The Ridleys) (2025)
