= Any Name's Okay =

Filipino alternative pop-rock band

- Origin: Manila, Philippines
- Genres: Indie rock; Alternative pop
- Years active: 2017–present
- Label: Sony Music Philippines
- Members: Sofia Abrogar; Renzo Lumanog; Anton Atienza; Juan Lada; Arvin Olete
- Past members: Mike Armas

Any Name's Okay is a 5-piece Filipino indie/alternative pop band formed in 2017. The band is composed of Sofia Abrogar on vocals, Renzo Lumanog on rhythm guitar and vocals, Anton Atienza on lead guitar, Juan Lada on bass, and Arvin Olete on drums.

The band has become a staple in the contemporary OPM indie scene. They released their EPs All I Feel and See (2019) and Leaving Home (2022).

== History ==
The band started out in late 2017 when three college freshmen from the University of the Philippines Diliman – namely Sofia Abrogar, Renzo Lumanog, and Juan Lada – formed their own group and applied as temporary band applicant to join the UP Music Circle. During that time, they recruited Arvin Olete for drums and Mike Armas for bass. They performed cover versions of Jackson 5, Ben&Ben, and IV of Spades around campus dormitories while their application was in the process. At the end of the period, they settled on naming their own band – eventually they chose "Any Name's Okay". According to Abrogar, they initially thought the band would end after their application.

Right after getting accepted into the UP Music Circle, the members were ready to disband. However, Lumanog managed to book them an outside slot at Manila Science High School’s "Masciang Paskuhan" event in December 2017. Wanting to play an original track for their first real gig outside campus, the band wrote their breakout debut single, "Clouds".

In 2019, the band officially signed to Sony Music Philippines. Later in that year, they released their 6-track debut EP All I Feel and See featuring lead single "Clouds". The band made their first international presence at Pasiwali Festival in Taiwan.

In 2022, they released their sophomore EP Leaving Home, featuring previously released single tracks including their lead single "Yugto". Later that year, Armas was departed from the band to focus on other priorities. Anton Atienza, the band's session/touring guitarist, officially joined the band full-time.

== Musical influence ==
The band draws from a mix of contemporary and indie acts, anime soundtracks, K-pop, and each member's distinct musical training. They also cited fellow UP Music Circle alumni and another indie rock band Oh, Flamingo! as a major early inspiration that showed them what an indie band could achieve.

== Band members ==
=== Current ===
- Sofia Abrogar — vocals
- Renzo Lumanog — rhythm guitar, vocals
- Juan Lada — bass
- Arvin Olete — drums
- Anton Atienza — lead guitar

=== Former ===
- Mike Armas — lead guitar

== Discography ==
=== Extended plays ===
List of extended plays with selected details
Title	EP Details
All I Feel and See	Released: December 21, 2019 (PH); Label: Sony Music Philippines; Format: Digital download, Streaming media
Leaving Home	Released: August 17, 2022 (PH); Label: Sony Music Philippines; Format: Digital download, Streaming media
