= Le John =

Filipino singer-songwriter and record producer

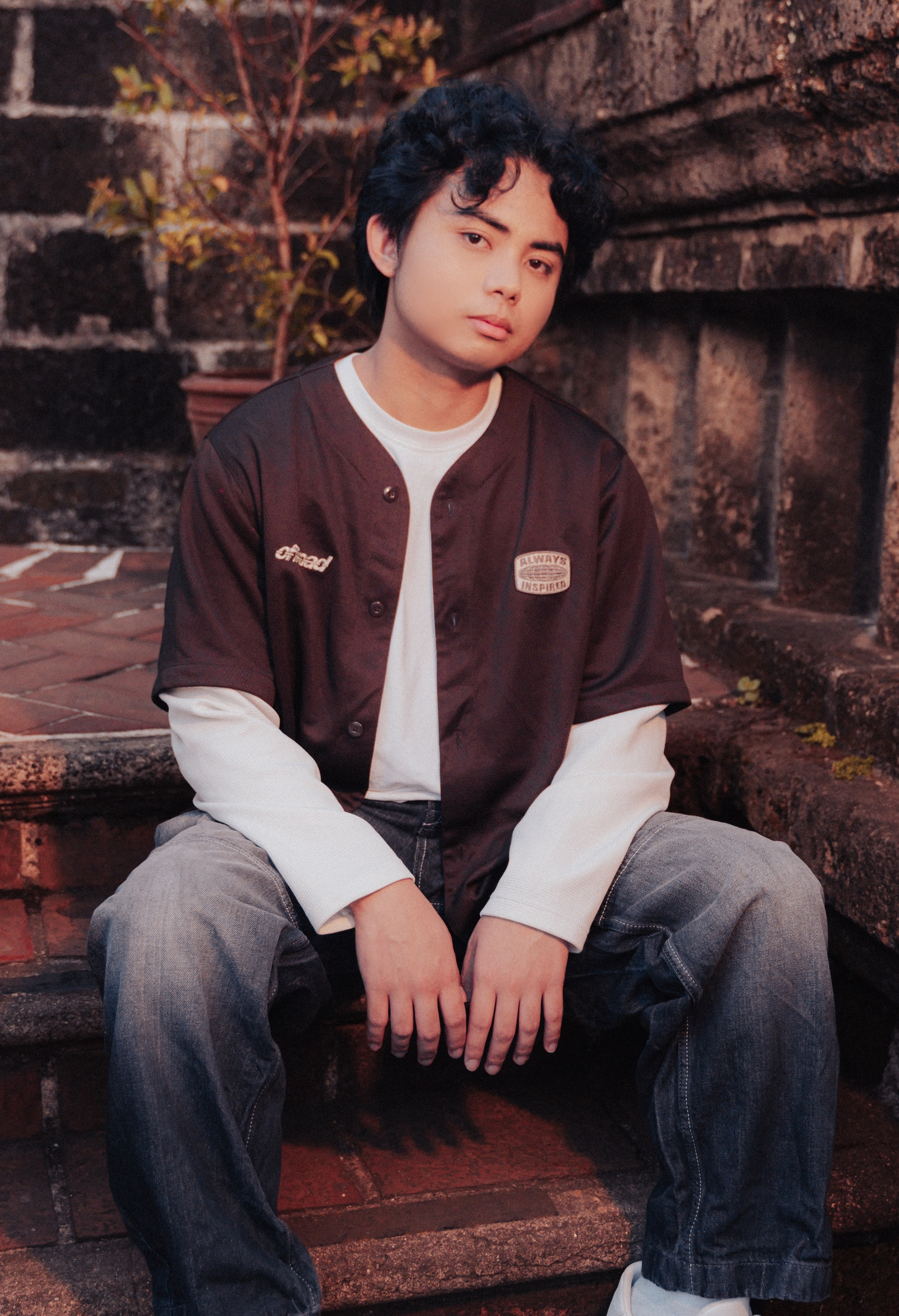
- Le John in 2026

Background information
- Born: Le John Escoro
- Origin: Tacloban City, Philippines
- Genres: Pop, R&B, alternative, OPM
- Occupations: Singer-songwriter, record producer
- Years active: 2020–present
- Label: Moody Music

Le John Escoro (known professionally as Le John) is a Filipino singer-songwriter and record producer from Tacloban City, Philippines. He gained wider recognition following the success of his single "Naiilang", which debuted on the Billboard Philippines Hot 100 and Top Philippine Songs charts in 2025. He is also the chief executive officer of Moody Music, an independent record label based in Tacloban City.

== Early life and education ==
Le John was born and raised in Tacloban City. He attended St. Therese Educational Foundation of Tacloban, Inc. (STEFTI), where he became involved in music through classroom jam sessions and school activities during high school.

== Career ==
Le John began his music career by recording covers before independently releasing original songs. He later learned music production using an iPad while developing his sound as an artist. In 2024, his single "Tayo" gained attention online and charted on Spotify Philippines Viral Chart.

In 2025, Le John released "Naiilang", which became his breakout single and reached number three on the Billboard Philippines Top Philippine Songs chart. Following the song's success, he later released a music video for "Naiilang" featuring actors AZ Martinez and Ralph de Leon. The music video later topped YouTube Philippines and trended online. Alongside his music career, he has also worked as a registered nurse in Florida.

In 2026, Le John collaborated with singer-songwriter Migs on "Mula Sa Malayo (Reimagined)", a reimagined version of the latter's single "Mula Sa Malayo".

== Influences ==
Le John has cited Charlie Puth and Bruno Mars as among his greatest musical influences. He has also mentioned Filipino artists and bands such as IV of Spades, December Avenue, and Zack Tabudlo as inspirations for his music and interest in OPM.

== Discography ==
=== Singles ===
Title	Year	Peak chart positions	
Title	Year	PHL Hot 100	PHL Top Philippine Songs
"By Your Side"	2020	—	—
"Back to Me"	2021	—	—
"Why"	2023	—	—
"Ikaw Na Ba"	2023	—	—
"Sumayaw"	2023	—	—
"Tayo"	2024	—	—
"Akala Ko"	2024	—	—
"Naiilang"	2025	5	3
"Alanganin"	2026	—	—
