= Esremborak =

Filipino rock band

- Genres: Alternative rock; indie rock; pop rock; Pinoy rock
- Years active: 2018–present
- Labels: Sevas Tra Records; Sony Music Philippines
- Members: MC Mislan; Michael Tamayo; Nathaniel Panganiban; Jun Rivera; Steven Pedro
- Past members: Leomar Requejo; Mary Paredes

Esremborak is a Filipino rock band formed in 2018. The band is composed of vocalist MC Mislan, bassist Michael Tamayo, ukulele players Nathaniel Panganiban and Jun Rivera, and drummer Steven Pedro. The band released its debut extended play (EP) Basura Songs in 2019. In 2026, its song "Mahal Magmahal" entered the Billboard Philippines Philippines Hot 100 after gaining popularity on TikTok.

== History ==
Esremborak's members came from different bands before forming the group. The band got its name from East Rembo, a barangay in Makati, where bassist Michael Tamayo lived and where the members often spent time together.

In 2018, the band gained attention for its ukulele-based music. Its members said they chose the ukulele to create a different sound from other bands. At the time, the five members were MC Mislan on vocals, Michael Tamayo on bass, Leomar Requejo and Nathaniel Panganiban on ukulele, and Mary Paredes on drums. All five were graduates of the Polytechnic University of the Philippines and worked as teachers.

In February 2019, Esremborak released its five-song debut EP Basura Songs, through independent label Sevas Tra Records. The EP was launched at the Polytechnic University of the Philippines in Manila. The band later performed at gigs, malls, and festivals in different parts of the country. In December, the band released the single "Chrisremborak".

In 2025, Esremborak released "Mahal Magmahal". The song plays on the double meaning of the Filipino word "mahal", which can mean both "love" and "expensive". Its lyrics about rising food prices, including the line, Mahal na ang bigas, pati lata ng sardinas went viral on TikTok. On the chart dated August 29, 2026, "Mahal Magmahal" debuted at number 69 on the Billboard Philippines Hot 100, marking the band's first appearance on the chart. On September 11, Esremborak released "Tenchu", its first single of the year. The release followed the band's appearance on the Philippines Hot 100.

== Band members ==
=== Current members ===
- MC Mislan – vocals
- Michael Tamayo – bass
- Nathaniel Panganiban – ukulele
- Jun Rivera – ukulele
- Steven "Peds" Pedro – drums

=== Former members ===
- Leomar Requejo – ukulele
- Mary Paredes – drums

== Discography ==
=== Extended plays ===
- Basura Songs (2019)

=== Selected singles ===
- "Chrisremborak" (2019)
- "Mahal Magmahal" (2025)
- "Tenchu" (2026)
