= Soapdish (band) =

Filipino pop rock band

- Genres: Pop rock; alternative rock; OPM
- Years active: 2001–present
- Label: Viva
- Members: Jeff Bolivar; Pei Signey; Melvin Feliciano; Jeffrey Castro
- Past members: Cesar Bendoy; Kurt Floresca

Soapdish is a Filipino pop rock band formed in 2001. They known for the songs "Tensionado" and "Pwede Ba?". The band is composed of Jeff Bolivar (vocals/guitar), Pei Signey (guitar), Melvin Feliciano (bass), and Jeffrey De Castro (drums). In 2025, their song "Tensionado" experienced a resurgence in popularity and debuted at number 21 on the Billboard Philippines Hot 100 chart.

== History ==
Soapdish was formed in 2001 by Jeff Bolivar, Cesar Bendoy, Terence Teves, and Kurt Floresca.

In 2005, the band released its self-titled debut album. The album included the singles "Ewan Ko", "Tensionado", and "Pwede Ba?". "Pwede Ba?" became one of the band's most recognized songs during this period.

In 2006, the album was re-released titled Soapdish Reloaded with the bonus track "Nandito Lang Ako", written by Bolivar. The song was used as the theme for the television series Posh, a co-production between Viva TV and GMA Network that aired on QTV 11. At the time of the album's release, the lineup included Bolivar, Pei Signey, Bendoy on bass, and Floresca on drums.

In February 2017, Soapdish released the single "Kung Puwede Lang" on digital platforms including Spotify, Apple Music, and iTunes.

In 2022, the band released the single "Pinapaasa," its first new material in three years. Around the same period, earlier singles such as "Pwede Ba?" and "Tensionado" gained renewed attention online.

In 2025, "Tensionado" debuted at number 21 on the Billboard Philippines Hot 100 chart. During the same tracking week, the song rose from number 58 to number 41 on the same chart. Originally released in 2005 as the opening track of the band's debut album. "Tensionado" is regarded as the group's biggest hit.

== Band members ==
=== Current members ===
- Jeff Bolivar – vocals, guitar
- Pei Signey – guitar
- Melvin Feliciano – bass
- Jeffrey Castro – drums

=== Former members ===
- Cesar Bendoy – bass, backing vocals
- Kurt Floresca – drums

== Discography ==
=== Studio albums ===
- Soapdish (2005)
- Goodluck... Goodbye (2009)

=== Selected singles ===
- "Ewan Ko"
- "Tensionado"
- "Pwede Ba?"
- "Nandito Lang Ako"
- "Pinapaasa"
- "Kung Puwede Lang"
