= Fina (group) =

Filipino girl group

FINA
- Origin: Philippines
- Genres: P-pop
- Years active: 2026–present
- Labels: Universal Records Philippines; CreaZion Studios Artists; GLXY Talent Management
- Members: Anika; Nala; Chill; Cia; Heaven

Fina (stylized in all caps) is a Filipino girl group under CreaZion Studios Artists, GLXY Talent Management, and Universal Records Philippines. The five-member group debuted on February 20, 2026, with the single "Paramdam".

== History ==
The group made their media launch in Quezon City on February 19, 2026. The group released their first single "Paramdam" with a music video on the next day, It took about three years of training for the group to debut. The group does not practice fixed position such as leader nor main dancer.

The name originally from the word "Filipina" and the phrase "fine as you are", promotional material associates each member with a figure from Philippine folklore.

== Members ==
- Anika
- Nala
- Chill
- Cia
- Heaven

The fandom name is Finest.

== Discography ==
=== Singles ===
Title	Year	Album
• Paramdam	2026	Non-album single
