= The Ridleys =

Filipino alternative folk band

- Origin: Manila, Philippines
- Genres: Indie pop; Alternative folk
- Years active: 2016–present
- Label: Underdog Music PH
- Members: Benny Manaligod; Jan De Vera; Bryant Ayes; LJ Panganiban
- Past members: Joric Canlas

The Ridleys is a Filipino indie/alternative folk band based in Manila, Philippines. Formed in 2016, it is composed of Benny Manaligod (vocals, acoustic guitar), Jan De Vera (lead guitar, backup vocals), Bryant Ayes (drums), and LJ Panganiban (bass guitar) with Modi Florentino as band manager.

They're officially signed to independent label Underdog Music PH.

== History ==
The band's origins trace back to 2016 when they've finished recording their debut EP Aphrodite and made its release in March of the same year.

In 2019, the band released its debut album, Reflections On Moonlight and Poetry, featuring a mix of new recordings and several songs from Aphrodite EP.

From 2022 to 2023, the band released Until I Reach The Sun, a two-volume EPs. The band released "Intertwine", a collaboration single with fellow band Over October.

In 2024, the band released its sophomore album All These And More, featuring songs like "Be With You". In October of the same year, the band made its first solo concert.

On March 2, 2025, in a newly-released vlog, bassist Joric Canlas announced his departure from the band. Following the announcement, Manaligod stated the band will move forward as a trio band.

In 2026, in addition with celebrating 10 years as a band, The Ridleys announced on Facebook that they are adding LJ Panganiban as their bass player until the foreseeable future, replacing Canlas who departed the band the year prior.

== Band members ==
=== Current ===
- Benny Manaligod - vocals, acoustic guitar (2016–present)
- Jan De Vera - lead guitar, backup vocals (2016–present)
- Bryant Ayes - drums (2016–present)
- LJ Panganiban - bass guitar (2026–present)

=== Former ===
- Joric Canlas - bass guitar (2016–2025)

== Discography ==
=== Studio albums ===
- Reflections On Moonlight and Poetry (2019)
- All These And More (2024)
- Until I Reach The Sun (2025)
- A Little Hope Will Have to Do (2026)

=== EPs ===
- Aphrodite (2016)
- Until I Reach The Sun (Vol. 1, 2022; Vol. 2, 2023)

== Accolades ==
| Award | Year | Category | Recipient(s) | Result | Ref. |
|---|---|---|---|---|---|
| Awit Awards | 2025 | Record of the Year | "Love Is" | Nominated | |
| Awit Awards | 2026 | Best World Music Recording | "Reprise" | Nominated | |
