= List of Everybody, Sing! episodes =

About the series
- Everybody, Sing! is a Philippine musical game show created and developed by ABS-CBN Corporation, and produced and distributed by ABS-CBN Studios. The game show is hosted by Vice Ganda.
- More about the series

Episodes overview
- Total episode(s): 202 episodes
- Aired episode(s): 120 episodes
- Special episode(s): 6 episodes
- Rerun(s): 76 episodes
- Last updated on October 4, 2026

The Philippine game show Everybody, Sing! has aired a total of 202 episodes since its premiere from June 5, 2021.

As of October 4, 2026, the show had aired 120 episodes, 6 special episodes, and 76 re-run episodes, including 2 from season 1 (due to the implementation of enhanced community quarantine in Metro Manila), 18 from season 2, 36 from season 3, and 20 from season 4.

== Episodes overview ==
Legend

The Songbayanan received the highest possible amount as their winning prize in the jackpot round. (Note: ₱500,000 for season 1; ₱1,000,000 for season 2; More than or equal to ₱1,000,000 for season 4; ₱2,000,000 for the special; and; More than or equal to ₱2,000,000 for season 3.)
The Songbayanan did not receive the highest possible amount as their winning prize in the jackpot round.
The Songbayanan did not receive any amount as their winning prize in the jackpot round.
No data.

List of aired, cancelled and upcoming episodes of Everybody, Sing!
Episode		Songbayanan	Prize won	Ref.
No.	Airing date	Songbayanan	Prize won	Ref.
Season 1
1	June 5, 2021	25 Community Pantry Volunteers	₱500,000	
2	June 6, 2021	25 Food and Beverage Service Crew	₱40,000	
3	June 12, 2021	25 Janitors and Cleaners	₱30,000 (Note: Excluding additional cash prize given by Vice Ganda.)	
4	June 13, 2021	25 Delivery Riders	₱20,000	
5	June 19, 2021	25 Grocery Frontliners (Note: This episode was supposed to air on June 13, 2021 but moved to June 19, 2021.)	₱30,000	
6	June 20, 2021	25 Fitness Instructors	₱30,000	
7	June 26, 2021	25 Massage Therapists	₱500,000	
8	June 27, 2021	25 Security Guards	₱20,000	
9	July 3, 2021	25 PGH Employees and Volunteers	₱40,000	
10	July 4, 2021	25 Contact Tracers	₱20,000	
11	July 10, 2021	25 Live Online Sellers	₱40,000	
12	July 11, 2021	25 Kasambahay (Housekeepers)	₱10,000	
13	July 17, 2021	25 Comedy Bar Performers	₱45,000	
14	July 18, 2021	25 Teachers	₱500,000	
15	July 24, 2021	25 Street Food Vendors	₱35,000	
16	July 25, 2021	25 Extras and Talents (Note: 25 Extras and Talents was announced to be featured in the show on June 27, 2021, and was supposed to air on July 3, 2021.)	₱30,000	
17	July 31, 2021	25 Bourne to Hike Mountaineers	₱25,000	
18	August 1, 2021	25 Bus, Jeepney, and Tricycle Drivers	₱500,000	
19	August 7, 2021	25 Seafarers	₱35,000	
20	August 8, 2021	25 Labandero at Labandera (Laundry Workers)	₱35,000	
21	August 21, 2021	25 Barangay Tanod (Village Watchmen)	₱25,000	
22	August 22, 2021	25 Call Center Agents	₱500,000	
23	August 28, 2021	25 Flight Attendants	₱70,000	
24	August 29, 2021	25 Factory Workers	₱500,000	
25	September 4, 2021	25 Tourism Industry Workers	₱15,000	
26	September 5, 2021	25 Stage Performers	₱40,000	
27	September 11, 2021	25 Pageant Winners	₱25,000	
28	September 12, 2021	25 Social Media Content Creators	₱35,000	
29	September 18, 2021	25 National Athletes	₱10,000	
30	September 19, 2021	25 Perya Performers (Fair Performers)	₱35,000	
100 Songbayanan Special
1	September 25, 2021	100 Haircutters	₱300,000	
2	September 26, 2021	100 Haircutters	₱300,000	
3	October 2, 2021	100 Palengke Vendors (Wet Market Vendors)	₱400,000	
4	October 3, 2021	100 Palengke Vendors (Wet Market Vendors)	₱400,000	
5	October 9, 2021	100 Taal Survivors (January 2020 Taal Eruption Survivors)	₱2,000,000	
6	October 10, 2021	100 Taal Survivors (January 2020 Taal Eruption Survivors)	₱2,000,000	
Season 2
1	September 24, 2022	50 Beauticians	₱1,000,000	
2	September 25, 2022	50 Mall Sale Clerks	₱70,000	
3	October 1, 2022	50 Kusinero't Kusinera (Chefs)	₱50,000	
4	October 2, 2022	50 Quiapo Vendors	₱40,000	
5	October 8, 2022	50 Construction Workers	₱80,000	
6	October 9, 2022	50 Sales Agents	₱60,000	
7	October 15, 2022	50 Mananahi (Dressmakers)	₱90,000	
8	October 16, 2022	50 Bank Employees	₱1,000,000	
9	October 29, 2022	50 Funeral and Cemetery Workers	₱50,000	
10	October 30, 2022	50 Repair and Service Technicians	₱90,000	
11	November 5, 2022	50 Gasoline Station Employees	₱1,000,000	
12	November 12, 2022	50 Karding Survivors & Heroes	₱60,000	
13	November 13, 2022	50 Mangingisda (Fishermen)	₱40,000	
14	November 19, 2022	50 Kambal at Triplets (Twins & Triplets)	₱40,000	
15	November 20, 2022	50 Drag Queens	₱60,000	
16	December 4, 2022	50 MMK Letter Senders	₱70,000	
17	December 10, 2022	50 Models	₱30,000	
18	December 17, 2022	50 Christmas Workers	₱50,000	
19	January 1, 2023	50 Bartenders	₱1,000,000	
20	January 7, 2023	50 Magsasaka (Farmers)	₱20,000	
21	January 15, 2023	50 Traffic Enforcers	₱80,000	
22	January 21, 2023	50 Overseas Filipino Workers (OFWs)	₱40,000	
23	January 28, 2023	50 Tricycle Drivers	₱70,000	
24	February 4, 2023	50 Pahinante (Porters)	₱70,000	
25	February 11, 2023	50 Dentists	₱70,000	
26	February 19, 2023	50 Magkasintahan at Mag-ex (Lovers and Exes)	₱1,000,000	
Season 3
1	June 3, 2023	100 Pulis (Policemen & Policewomen)	₱150,000	
2	June 4, 2023	100 Pulis (Policemen & Policewomen)	₱150,000	
3	June 10, 2023	100 Sanitation Workers	₱230,000	
4	June 11, 2023	100 Sanitation Workers	₱230,000	
5	June 17, 2023	100 Mag-Ama (Fathers and Children)	₱2,140,000	
6	June 18, 2023	100 Mag-Ama (Fathers and Children)	₱2,140,000	
7	June 24, 2023	100 Manila Fire Survivors (May 2023 Sta. Cruz, Manila Fire Incident Survivors)	₱2,200,000	
8	June 25, 2023	100 Manila Fire Survivors (May 2023 Sta. Cruz, Manila Fire Incident Survivors)	₱2,200,000	
9	July 1, 2023	100 Engaged Couples	₱290,000	
10	July 2, 2023	100 Engaged Couples	₱290,000	
11	July 8, 2023	100 Sari-Sari Store Sellers (Variety Store Sellers)	₱150,000	
12	July 9, 2023	100 Sari-Sari Store Sellers (Variety Store Sellers)	₱150,000	
13	July 15, 2023	100 Tattoo & Body Piercing Artists	₱180,000	
14	July 16, 2023	100 Tattoo & Body Piercing Artists	₱180,000	
15	July 29, 2023	100 Nurses	₱190,000	
16	July 30, 2023	100 Nurses	₱190,000	
17	August 5, 2023	100 Government Employees	₱180,000	
18	August 6, 2023	100 Government Employees	₱180,000	
19	September 2, 2023	100 Mangangalakal (Garbage Collectors)	₱2,200,000	
20	September 3, 2023	100 Mangangalakal (Garbage Collectors)	₱2,200,000	
21	September 9, 2023	100 Dancers	₱130,000	
22	September 10, 2023	100 Dancers	₱130,000	
23	September 16, 2023	100 2023 College Graduates	₱210,000	
24	September 17, 2023	100 2023 College Graduates	₱210,000	
25	September 23, 2023	100 Pawnshop & Money Remittance Tellers	₱150,000	
26	September 24, 2023	100 Pawnshop & Money Remittance Tellers	₱150,000	
27	September 30, 2023	100 Band Members	₱170,000	
28	October 1, 2023	100 Band Members	₱170,000	
29	October 14, 2023	100 Taguig Tenement Community (Fort Bonifacio Tenement Occupants)	₱140,000	
30	October 15, 2023	100 Taguig Tenement Community (Fort Bonifacio Tenement Occupants)	₱140,000	
31	November 18, 2023	100 Pharmacists & Botika Employees (Licensed Pharmacists & Pharmacy Employees)	₱2,080,000	
32	November 19, 2023	100 Pharmacists & Botika Employees (Licensed Pharmacists & Pharmacy Employees)	₱2,080,000	
33	November 25, 2023	100 Solo Parents	₱270,000	
34	November 26, 2023	100 Solo Parents	₱270,000	
35	December 2, 2023	100 Magbabalut (Fertilized Duck Egg Vendors)	₱180,000	
36	December 3, 2023	100 Magbabalut (Fertilized Duck Egg Vendors)	₱180,000	
37	February 10, 2024	100 Divisoria Stall Sellers	₱2,040,000	
38	February 11, 2024	100 Divisoria Stall Sellers	₱2,040,000	
Season 4
1	May 2, 2026	50 Calumpit, Bulacan Residents (Flooded Community)	₱1,060,000	
2	May 3, 2026	50 Calumpit, Bulacan Residents (Flooded Community)	₱1,060,000	
3	May 9, 2026	50 Haligi ng Palengke (Wet Market/Palengke Vendors)	₱120,000	
4	May 10, 2026	50 Haligi ng Palengke (Wet Market/Palengke Vendors)	₱120,000	
5	May 16, 2026	50 Choir Members	₱200,000	
6	May 17, 2026	50 Choir Members	₱200,000	
7	May 23, 2026	50 Virtual Assistants	₱180,000	
8	May 24, 2026	50 Virtual Assistants	₱180,000	
9	May 30, 2026	50 TNVS Drivers	₱1,020,000	
10	May 31, 2026	50 TNVS Drivers	₱1,020,000	
11	June 6, 2026	50 Generation X and Millennial Singles	₱220,000	
12	June 7, 2026	50 Generation X and Millennial Singles	₱220,000	
13	June 13, 2026	50 Food Bazaar Crew	₱180,000	
14	June 14, 2026	50 Food Bazaar Crew	₱180,000	
15	July 4, 2026	50 Online Couples	₱1,020,000	
16	July 5, 2026	50 Online Couples	₱1,020,000	
17	July 11, 2026	50 Mag-Lolo at Mag-Lola (Grandparents and Grandchildren)	₱200,000	
18	July 12, 2026	50 Mag-Lolo at Mag-Lola (Grandparents and Grandchildren)	₱200,000	
19	August 22, 2026	50 Event Hosts and Performers	₱200,000	
20	August 23, 2026	50 Event Hosts and Performers	₱200,000	
21	September 5, 2026	50 Mag-Best Friends	₱200,000	
22	September 6, 2026	50 Mag-Best Friends	₱200,000	
23	September 19, 2026	50 Baristas (Coffee Shop Employees)	₱200,000	
24	September 20, 2026	50 Baristas (Coffee Shop Employees)	₱200,000	
25	October 3, 2026	50 Baseco, Manila Residents	₱100,000	
26	October 4, 2026	50 Baseco, Manila Residents	₱100,000	

== Season 1 ==
The first season ran from June 5 to October 10, 2021, and had aired a total of 38 episodes, consisting of 30 aired episodes, six special episodes, and two episode re-runs that were aired due to the implementation of enhanced community quarantine in Metro Manila.

The first season aired six special episodes which featured the game show's original format which was taped before the COVID-19 pandemic and the ABS-CBN franchise shutdown known as the 100 Songbayanan Special as its season finale one week after the airing of the 25 Perya Performers episode and ran for three weeks with six episodes on September 25 until October 10, 2021.

This season, thirty-three groups played, with thirty in the modified format and three in the original format (100 Songbayanan Special). During the modified format, six groups won the jackpot prize of ₱500,000, the most in a season in the entire series. During the original format, one group won the jackpot prize of ₱2,000,000.

== 100 Songbayanan Special ==
From September 25 to October 10, 2021, the program aired special episodes dubbed as "100 Songbayanan Special" which were shot before the COVID-19 pandemic and the ABS-CBN shutdown. These special episodes featured the program's original format with 100 players, 10 rounds and a ₱2 million jackpot prize.

Legend

- – The SONGpu contestant successfully guessed the line of the song correctly.
- – The SONGpu contestant failed to give any correct line of the song.
- – During the Jackpot round ("Everybody GuesSing"), the Songbayanan guessed the song correctly.
- – During the Jackpot round ("Everybody GuesSing"), the Songbayanan did not guess the song correctly.

Week 1 (September 25–26, 2021)
Episode		Songbayanan	Preliminary Rounds													Jackpot round (Everybody GuesSing)		Prize won	Ref.
No.	Airing date	Songbayanan	Game	Song	SONGpu											Timer	Songs	Prize won	Ref.
No.	Airing date	Songbayanan	Game	Song	Rows	1	2	3	4	5	6	7	8	9	10	Timer	Songs	Prize won	Ref.
31	September 25, 2021	100 Haircutters #EverybodySing100Buhok	Sing in the Blank	"Top of the World" by The Carpenters	1	No	No	No	Yes	Yes	No	Yes	Yes	Yes	No	79 secs.	"Maling Akala" by Brownman Revival	₱300,000	
31	September 25, 2021	100 Haircutters #EverybodySing100Buhok	Sing in the Blank	"Harana" by Parokya Ni Edgar	5	Yes	Yes	Yes	Yes	Yes	No	Yes	No	Yes	Yes	79 secs.	"Ipagpatawad Mo" by VST & Co.	₱300,000	
31	September 25, 2021	100 Haircutters #EverybodySing100Buhok	PicSing A Broken Song	"Waiting For Tonight" by Jennifer Lopez	10	No	No	No	Yes	Yes	Yes	No	No	Yes	No	79 secs.	"Magsimula Ka" by Leo Valdez	₱300,000	
31	September 25, 2021	100 Haircutters #EverybodySing100Buhok	PicSing A Broken Song	"Kahit Ayaw Mo Na" by This Band	2	Yes	Yes	Yes	Yes	Yes	Yes	No	Yes	No	Yes	79 secs.	"Later" by Fra Lippo Lippi	₱300,000	
31	September 25, 2021	100 Haircutters #EverybodySing100Buhok	EngliSing ang Lyrics	"You've Made Me Stronger" by Regine Velasquez	4	Yes	Yes	Yes	Yes	Yes	Yes	Yes	No	Yes	Yes	79 secs.	"Someone's Always Saying Goodbye" by Allona	₱300,000	
31	September 25, 2021	100 Haircutters #EverybodySing100Buhok	EngliSing ang Lyrics	"Breathless" by The Corrs	9	Yes	Yes	Yes	No	Yes	Yes	Yes	No	No	No	79 secs.	"O Pag-ibig" by Bailey May and Ylona Garcia	₱300,000	
32	September 26, 2021	100 Haircutters #EverybodySing100Buhok	The ChooSing One	"In Love Ako Sa'yo" by Darren Espanto	3	Yes	Yes	Yes	Yes	Yes	No	Yes	Yes	Yes	No	79 secs.	"Orange Colored Sky" by Nat King Cole	₱300,000	
32	September 26, 2021	100 Haircutters #EverybodySing100Buhok	The ChooSing One	"Catch Me I'm Falling" by Toni Gonzaga	7	Yes	No	Yes	Yes	Yes	Yes	Yes	Yes	Yes	Yes	79 secs.	"Limang Dipang Tao" by Ryan Cayabyab	₱300,000	
32	September 26, 2021	100 Haircutters #EverybodySing100Buhok	ReverSing	"Natatawa Ako" by Gabriella	8	Yes	Yes	Yes	No	No	No	No	Yes	Yes	Yes	79 secs.	"Semi-Charmed Life" by Third Eye Blind	₱300,000	
32	September 26, 2021	100 Haircutters #EverybodySing100Buhok	ReverSing	"Di Bale Na Lang" by Gary Valenciano	6	No	No	Yes	No	Yes	Yes	No	Yes	Yes	No	79 secs.	"Bato sa Buhangin" by Cinderella	₱300,000	

Week 2 (October 2–3, 2021)
Episode		Songbayanan	Preliminary Rounds													Jackpot round (Everybody GuesSing)		Prize won	Ref.
No.	Airing date	Songbayanan	Game	Song	Row	1	2	3	4	5	6	7	8	9	10	Timer	Songs	Prize won	Ref.
33	October 2, 2021	100 Palengke Vendors #EverybodySing100Palengke #ESPalengkeJackpot	Sing in the Blank	"Katawan" by Hagibis	2	Yes	Yes	No	Yes	Yes	No	Yes	Yes	No	Yes	66 secs.	"Hawak Kamay" by Yeng Constantino	₱400,000	-
33	October 2, 2021	100 Palengke Vendors #EverybodySing100Palengke #ESPalengkeJackpot	Sing in the Blank	"Total Eclipse of the Heart" by Bonnie Tyler	5	No	No	Yes	Yes	Yes	Yes	No	No	No	No	66 secs.	"Titibo-tibo" by Moira Dela Torre	₱400,000	-
33	October 2, 2021	100 Palengke Vendors #EverybodySing100Palengke #ESPalengkeJackpot	PicSing a Broken Song	"Magasin" by Eraserheads	7	Yes	Yes	No	Yes	Yes	Yes	Yes	Yes	No	No	66 secs.	"Bette Davis Eyes" by Kim Carnes	₱400,000	-
33	October 2, 2021	100 Palengke Vendors #EverybodySing100Palengke #ESPalengkeJackpot	PicSing a Broken Song	"Get Here" by Oleta Adams	4	Yes	Yes	Yes	No	No	Yes	No	No	No	Yes	66 secs.	"Estudyante Blues" by Freddie Aguilar	₱400,000	-
33	October 2, 2021	100 Palengke Vendors #EverybodySing100Palengke #ESPalengkeJackpot	EngliSing ang Lyrics	"Macarthur Park" by Donna Summer	3	Yes	Yes	No	Yes	No	Yes	No	No	No	Yes	66 secs.	"Paraisong Parisukat" by Basil Valdez	₱400,000	-
33	October 2, 2021	100 Palengke Vendors #EverybodySing100Palengke #ESPalengkeJackpot	EngliSing ang Lyrics	"Growing Up" by Gary Valenciano	9	No	No	Yes	No	Yes	Yes	Yes	Yes	No	Yes	66 secs.	"Better World" by Smokey Mountain	₱400,000	-
34	October 3, 2021	100 Palengke Vendors #EverybodySing100Palengke #ESPalengkeJackpot	The Choosing One	"Electric Youth" by Debbie Gibson	1	Yes	Yes	No	No	Yes	No	No	Yes	No	Yes	66 secs.	"Tainted Love" by Soft Cell	₱400,000	-
34	October 3, 2021	100 Palengke Vendors #EverybodySing100Palengke #ESPalengkeJackpot	The Choosing One	Forever's Not Enough by Sarah Geronimo	8	No	No	Yes	Yes	Yes	Yes	Yes	No	Yes	Yes	66 secs.	"Mahal Ka sa Akin" by Tootsie Guevara	₱400,000	-
34	October 3, 2021	100 Palengke Vendors #EverybodySing100Palengke #ESPalengkeJackpot	ReverSing	Bakit Nga Ba Mahal Kita by Roselle Nava	10	No	No	Yes	Yes	Yes	Yes	No	Yes	Yes	Yes	66 secs.	"Simple Lang" by Ariel Rivera	₱400,000	-
34	October 3, 2021	100 Palengke Vendors #EverybodySing100Palengke #ESPalengkeJackpot	ReverSing	Dahil Sa'yo by Inigo Pascual	6	No	Yes	No	No	No	No	Yes	No	Yes	No	66 secs.	"Isang Mundo, Isang Awit" by Leah Navarro	₱400,000	-

Week 3 (October 9–10, 2021)
Episode		Songbayanan	Preliminary Rounds													Jackpot round (Everybody GuesSing)		Prize won	Ref.
No.	Airing date	Songbayanan	Game	Song	Row	1	2	3	4	5	6	7	8	9	10	Timer	Songs	Prize won	Ref.
35	October 9, 2021	100 Taal Survivors #EverybodySing100Taal #EverybodySingTogether	Sing in the Blank	"Bonggahan" by Sampaguita	4	Yes	Yes	No	No	No	No	Yes	Yes	Yes	Yes	77 secs.	"Sayang Na Sayang" by Aegis	₱2,000,000	-
35	October 9, 2021	100 Taal Survivors #EverybodySing100Taal #EverybodySingTogether	Sing in the Blank	"Ikaw at Ako" by Moira and Jason	7	No	No	No	Yes	Yes	Yes	Yes	Yes	Yes	Yes	77 secs.	"Isang Linggong Pag-Ibig" by Imelda Papin	₱2,000,000	-
35	October 9, 2021	100 Taal Survivors #EverybodySing100Taal #EverybodySingTogether	PicSing a Broken Song	"Wind Beneath My Wings" by Bette Midler	8	No	No	Yes	No	Yes	No	Yes	Yes	No	No	77 secs.	"Pusong Bato" by Aimee Torres	₱2,000,000	-
35	October 9, 2021	100 Taal Survivors #EverybodySing100Taal #EverybodySingTogether	PicSing a Broken Song	"Time In" by Yeng Constantino	3	Yes	No	No	Yes	Yes	Yes	No	No	No	No	77 secs.	"Bukas Na Lang Kita Mamahalin" by Lani Misalucha	₱2,000,000	-
35	October 9, 2021	100 Taal Survivors #EverybodySing100Taal #EverybodySingTogether	EngliSing and Lyrics	"This I Promise You" by NSYNC	2	Yes	Yes	Yes	Yes	Yes	Yes	Yes	Yes	Yes	No	77 secs.	"Yugyugan Na" by P.O.T.	₱2,000,000	-
35	October 9, 2021	100 Taal Survivors #EverybodySing100Taal #EverybodySingTogether	EngliSing and Lyrics	"Before I Let You Go"; Freestyle	9	No	No	No	Yes	Yes	Yes	Yes	Yes	Yes	No	77 secs.	"Reaching Out" by Gary Valenciano	₱2,000,000	-
36	October 10, 2021	100 Taal Survivors #EverybodySing100Taal #EverybodySingTogether	The ChooSing One	"I Will Survive" by Gloria Gaynor	5	Yes	No	No	Yes	Yes	No	Yes	Yes	Yes	Yes	77 secs.	"Insomnia" by Craig David	₱2,000,000	-
36	October 10, 2021	100 Taal Survivors #EverybodySing100Taal #EverybodySingTogether	The ChooSing One	"Narito Ako" by Regine Velasquez	1	Yes	No	No	No	Yes	Yes	No	Yes	Yes	Yes	77 secs.	"Langis At Tubig" by Sharon Cuneta	₱2,000,000	-
36	October 10, 2021	100 Taal Survivors #EverybodySing100Taal #EverybodySingTogether	ReverSing	"Simpleng Tulad Mo" by Daniel Padilla	10	Yes	Yes	No	Yes	No	Yes	No	No	No	Yes	77 secs.	"Malayo Pa Ang Umaga" by Rey Valera	₱2,000,000	-
36	October 10, 2021	100 Taal Survivors #EverybodySing100Taal #EverybodySingTogether	ReverSing	"Pagsubok" by Orient Pearl	6	Yes	Yes	Yes	Yes	Yes	Yes	Yes	Yes	Yes	No	77 secs.	"Smoke Gets In Your Eyes" by The Platters	₱2,000,000	-

== Season 2 ==
The second season ran from September 24, 2022, until February 19, 2023, and had aired a total of 44 episodes, consisting of 26 aired episodes and 18 episode re-runs.

Twenty six groups have played for this season and only five groups had won the jackpot prize of ₱1,000,000 during the entire run.

== Season 3 ==
The third season had aired 74 episodes between June 3, 2023, and February 11, 2024, with 38 aired episodes and 36 re-run episodes, the most of any season in the series.

This season, nineteen groups played the entire series, and only five groups claimed the jackpot prize of more than ₱2,000,000, tying the second season.

== Season 4 ==
Legend

- – The SONGpu contestant successfully guessed the line of the song correctly.
- – The SONGpu contestant failed to give any correct line of the song.
- – During the Jackpot round ("Everybody GuesSing"), the Songbayanan guessed the song correctly.
- – During the Jackpot round ("Everybody GuesSing"), the Songbayanan did not guess the song correctly.

Week 1 (May 2-3, 2026)
Episode	Airing date	Songbayanan	Preliminary rounds														Jackpot round (Everybody GuesSing)		Prize won	Ref.
Episode	Airing date	Songbayanan	Game	Song	SONGpu											Timer	Songs		Prize won	Ref.
Episode	Airing date	Songbayanan	Game	Song	Row	1	2	3	4	5	6	7	8	9	10	Timer	Songs		Prize won	Ref.
1	May 2, 2026	50 Calumpit, Bulacan Residents (Flooded Community) #EverybodySingAhon #EverybodySingRise	Sing in the Blank	"Luha" by Aegis	3	Yes	Yes	Yes	Yes	Yes	Yes	No	Yes	Yes	Yes	97 secs.	"Ye Ye Vonnel" by April Boy Regino	"Silvertoes" by Parokya ni Edgar	₱1,060,000	
1	May 2, 2026	50 Calumpit, Bulacan Residents (Flooded Community) #EverybodySingAhon #EverybodySingRise	Lights, Camera, Act-Sing	"Making Love Out of Nothing at All" by Air Supply	1	No	Yes	Yes	Yes	Yes	Yes	Yes	No	No	Yes	97 secs.	"Lead Me Lord" by Gary Valenciano	"Love of My Life" by South Border	₱1,060,000	
2	May 3, 2026	50 Calumpit, Bulacan Residents (Flooded Community) #EverybodySingAhon #EverybodySingRise	Sing Tunog	"Ikaw" by Yeng Constantino	5	No	Yes	Yes	Yes	Yes	Yes	Yes	Yes	No	Yes	97 secs.	"Kapayapaan" by Tropical Depression	"Pangarap Lang" by Yeng Constantino	₱1,060,000	
2	May 3, 2026	50 Calumpit, Bulacan Residents (Flooded Community) #EverybodySingAhon #EverybodySingRise	Pic-Sing a Broken Song	"Uhaw" by Dilaw	4	No	Yes	No	Yes	No	No	No	Yes	Yes	Yes	97 secs.	"Kilometro" by Sarah Geronimo	"Bikining Itim" by Bert Dominic	₱1,060,000	
2	May 3, 2026	50 Calumpit, Bulacan Residents (Flooded Community) #EverybodySingAhon #EverybodySingRise	ReverSing	"Dahil Mahal na Mahal Kita" by Roselle Nava	2	Yes	No	Yes	Yes	Yes	Yes	Yes	Yes	Yes	Yes	97 secs.	"Naririnig Mo Ba" by Morissette	"Pagdating ng Panahon" by Ice Seguerra	₱1,060,000	
Guests: Iyah Mina and Petite (Episodes 1 and 2); Ayegee Paredes (Episode 1 Resident Jammer); Bela Padilla (Episode 1, Singko Blanko); JM Dela Cerna and Marielle Montellano (Episode 2)

Week 2 (May 9–10, 2026)
Episode	Airing date	Songbayanan	Preliminary rounds														Jackpot round (Everybody GuesSing)		Prize won	Ref.
Episode	Airing date	Songbayanan	Game	Song	SONGpu											Timer	Songs		Prize won	Ref.
Episode	Airing date	Songbayanan	Game	Song	Row	1	2	3	4	5	6	7	8	9	10	Timer	Songs		Prize won	Ref.
3	May 9, 2026	50 Haligi ng Palengke #EverybodySingTinda #EverybodySingSuki	Sing in the Blank	"The Spageti Song" by Sexbomb Girls feat. Joey de Leon	5	No	Yes	No	Yes	No	No	No	Yes	Yes	Yes	59 secs.	"Legs" by Hagibis	"Rain" by Donna Cruz	₱120,000	
3	May 9, 2026	50 Haligi ng Palengke #EverybodySingTinda #EverybodySingSuki	Lights, Camera, Act-Sing	"Ale" by The Bloomfields	4	No	No	No	No	No	No	No	Yes	No	Yes	59 secs.	"Panalangin" by APO Hiking Society	"Paniwalaan" by Blue Jeans	₱120,000	
4	May 10, 2026	50 Haligi ng Palengke #EverybodySingTinda #EverybodySingSuki	The ChooSing One	"Hanggang Ngayon" by Kyla	2	Yes	Yes	Yes	Yes	Yes	Yes	Yes	Yes	Yes	Yes	59 secs.	"Oks Lang" by John Roa	"KSP (Kulang sa Pansin)" by Rachel Alejandro	₱120,000	
4	May 10, 2026	50 Haligi ng Palengke #EverybodySingTinda #EverybodySingSuki	TagaliSing	"Good Boy" by Blakdyak	1	No	Yes	Yes	Yes	No	Yes	No	Yes	No	No	59 secs.	"Sana'y Wala Nang Wakas" by Sharon Cuneta	"Una at Huling Mamahalin" by Louie Heredia	₱120,000	
4	May 10, 2026	50 Haligi ng Palengke #EverybodySingTinda #EverybodySingSuki	Ayu-Sing Mo	"Laging Tapat" by Jolina Magdangal	3	No	No	No	No	Yes	No	Yes	No	Yes	No	59 secs.	"Rock Baby Rock" by VST & Co.	"Ang Sa Iyo Ay Akin" by Aegis	₱120,000	
Guests: Iyah Mina and Petite (Episodes 3 and 4); Ayegee Paredes (Episode 3 Resident Jammer); Kyle Echarri (Episode 3, Singko Blanko); Kyla (Episode 4)

Week 3 (May 16–17, 2026)
Episode	Airing date	Songbayanan	Preliminary rounds														Jackpot round (Everybody GuesSing)		Prize won	Ref.
Episode	Airing date	Songbayanan	Game	Song	SONGpu											Timer	Songs		Prize won	Ref.
Episode	Airing date	Songbayanan	Game	Song	Row	1	2	3	4	5	6	7	8	9	10	Timer	Songs		Prize won	Ref.
5	May 16, 2026	50 Choir Members #EverybodySingKorista #EverybodySingHimig	Sing in the Blank	"Ikaw Ang Lahat Sa Akin" by Regine Velasquez	2	No	No	No	Yes	Yes	No	No	Yes	Yes	No	88 secs.	"Bring Me Down" by Rivermaya	"Tabing Ilog" by Barbie's Cradle	₱200,000	
5	May 16, 2026	50 Choir Members #EverybodySingKorista #EverybodySingHimig	LipSing	"Pantropiko" by BINI	3	No	No	Yes	Yes	No	Yes	Yes	Yes	Yes	Yes	88 secs.	"Catch Me I'm Falling" by Toni Gonzaga	"The Light" by BGYO	₱200,000	
6	May 17, 2026	50 Choir Members #EverybodySingKorista #EverybodySingHimig	The ChooSing One	"Minsan Lang Kita Iibigin" by Ariel Rivera	5	Yes	Yes	Yes	Yes	Yes	Yes	Yes	Yes	Yes	Yes	88 secs.	"My Love Will See You Through" by Marco Sison	"Ate Sandali" by Maris Racal	₱200,000	
6	May 17, 2026	50 Choir Members #EverybodySingKorista #EverybodySingHimig	A-B-Sing	"Multo" by Cup of Joe	1	Yes	Yes	No	No	Yes	Yes	No	Yes	No	Yes	88 secs.	"Ikaw Na Nga" by Willie Revillame	"Natatawa Ako" by Gabriela	₱200,000	
6	May 17, 2026	50 Choir Members #EverybodySingKorista #EverybodySingHimig	ReverSing	"Babalik Sa'yo" by Moira dela Torre	4	Yes	Yes	Yes	Yes	Yes	No	Yes	Yes	No	Yes	88 secs.	"How Could You Say You Love Me" by Sarah Geronimo	"Muli Mong Mahalin" by April Boys	₱200,000	
Guests: Iyah Mina and Petite (Episodes 5 and 6); Ayegee Paredes (Episode 5 Resident Jammer); Lella Ford and Joaquin Arce (Episode 5, Singko Blanko); Jason Dy (Episode 6)

Week 4 (May 23–24, 2026)
Episode	Airing date	Songbayanan	Preliminary rounds														Jackpot round (Everybody GuesSing)		Prize won	Ref.
Episode	Airing date	Songbayanan	Game	Song	SONGpu											Timer	Songs		Prize won	Ref.
Episode	Airing date	Songbayanan	Game	Song	Row	1	2	3	4	5	6	7	8	9	10	Timer	Songs		Prize won	Ref.
7	May 23, 2026	50 Virtual Assistants #EverybodySingVirtual #EverybodySingAssistant	Sing in the Blank	"Pangako" by Regine Velasquez	1	Yes	Yes	Yes	Yes	Yes	Yes	Yes	Yes	Yes	Yes	101 secs.	"Pano" by Zack Tabudlo	"This Guy's In Love With You Pare" by Parokya ni Edgar	₱180,000	
7	May 23, 2026	50 Virtual Assistants #EverybodySingVirtual #EverybodySingAssistant	LipSing	"Saranggola" by Ben&Ben	3	No	No	No	No	Yes	Yes	No	Yes	Yes	Yes	101 secs.	"Akin Ka Na Lang" by Morissette	"Kundiman" by Rob Deniel	₱180,000	
8	May 24, 2026	50 Virtual Assistants #EverybodySingVirtual #EverybodySingAssistant	The ChooSing One	"Ikaw ay Ako" by Klarisse de Guzman and Morissette	5	Yes	No	Yes	Yes	No	Yes	Yes	Yes	Yes	Yes	101 secs.	"Katawan" by Hagibis	"Babaero" by Randy Santiago	₱180,000	
8	May 24, 2026	50 Virtual Assistants #EverybodySingVirtual #EverybodySingAssistant	EngliSing ang Lyrics	"Girl Be Mine" by Francis Magalona	4	Yes	Yes	Yes	Yes	No	Yes	Yes	Yes	Yes	Yes	101 secs.	"Muntik Na Kitang Minahal" by The Company	"Just Wanna Be With You" by Side A	₱180,000	
8	May 24, 2026	50 Virtual Assistants #EverybodySingVirtual #EverybodySingAssistant	Ayu-Sing Mo	"Bulong" by Kitchie Nadal	2	Yes	No	Yes	Yes	Yes	Yes	Yes	Yes	Yes	Yes	101 secs.	"Di Kita Pagpapalit" by Rockstar 2	"Tsinelas" by Yano	₱180,000	
Guests: Iyah Mina and Petite (Episodes 7 and 8); Ayegee Paredes (Episode 7 Resident Jammer); Donny Pangilinan (Episode 7, Singko Blanko); Klarisse de Guzman (Episode 8)

Week 5 (May 30–31, 2026)
Episode	Airing date	Songbayanan	Preliminary rounds														Jackpot round (Everybody GuesSing)		Prize won	Ref.
Episode	Airing date	Songbayanan	Game	Song	SONGpu											Timer	Songs		Prize won	Ref.
Episode	Airing date	Songbayanan	Game	Song	Row	1	2	3	4	5	6	7	8	9	10	Timer	Songs		Prize won	Ref.
9	May 30, 2026	50 TNVS Drivers #EverybodySingSakay #EverybodySingSundo	Sing in the Blank	"Never Ever Say Goodbye" by Regine Velasquez	2	No	No	Yes	No	Yes	Yes	No	No	No	No	91 secs.	"Banal Na Aso, Santong Kabayo" by Yano	"Aura" by IV of Spades	₱1,020,000	
9	May 30, 2026	50 TNVS Drivers #EverybodySingSakay #EverybodySingSundo	Lights, Camera, Act-Sing	"'Di Bale Na Lang" by Gary Valenciano	4	Yes	Yes	Yes	No	Yes	Yes	Yes	Yes	Yes	Yes	91 secs.	"Otso-Otso" by Bayani Agbayani	"Laki sa Layaw" by Mike Hanopol	₱1,020,000	
10	May 31, 2026	50 TNVS Drivers #EverybodySingSakay #EverybodySingSundo	The ChooSing One	"Dilaw" by Maki	3	Yes	Yes	Yes	Yes	Yes	Yes	Yes	Yes	Yes	Yes	91 secs.	"Pagsamo" by Arthur Nery	"Anak" by Freddie Aguilar	₱1,020,000	
10	May 31, 2026	50 TNVS Drivers #EverybodySingSakay #EverybodySingSundo	PicSing a Broken Song	"Rainbow" by South Border	5	Yes	Yes	No	Yes	Yes	No	Yes	No	Yes	Yes	91 secs.	"Boom Panes" by Vice Ganda	"Babalik Ka Rin" by Gary Valenciano	₱1,020,000	
10	May 31, 2026	50 TNVS Drivers #EverybodySingSakay #EverybodySingSundo	ReverSing	"Sana'y Ikaw Na Nga" by Vina Morales	1	Yes	Yes	Yes	Yes	Yes	Yes	No	Yes	Yes	No	91 secs.	"Loveteam" by The Itchyworms	"Meron Ba" by Nikki Valdez	₱1,020,000	
Guests: Iyah Mina and Petite (Episodes 9 and 10); Ayegee Paredes (Episode 9 Resident Jammer); Ralph de Leon (Episode 9, Singko Blanko); Maki (Episode 10)

Week 6 (June 6–7, 2026)
Episode	Airing date	Songbayanan	Preliminary rounds														Jackpot round (Everybody GuesSing)		Prize won	Ref.
Episode	Airing date	Songbayanan	Game	Song	SONGpu											Timer	Songs		Prize won	Ref.
Episode	Airing date	Songbayanan	Game	Song	Row	1	2	3	4	5	6	7	8	9	10	Timer	Songs		Prize won	Ref.
11	June 6, 2026	50 Gen X and Millennial Singles #EverybodySingleEra #EverybodySingSelfLove	Sing in the Blank	"To Love You More" by Sarah Geronimo	1	No	Yes	Yes	Yes	Yes	Yes	Yes	Yes	Yes	No	78 secs.	"Paglisan" by Color It Red	"Kung Akin Ang Mundo" by Erik Santos	₱220,000	
11	June 6, 2026	50 Gen X and Millennial Singles #EverybodySingleEra #EverybodySingSelfLove	Lights, Camera, Act-Sing	"I'll Never Go" by Nexxus	2	Yes	No	Yes	Yes	No	Yes	No	Yes	Yes	Yes	78 secs.	"London Bridge is Falling Down"	"Pen Pen de Sarapen"	₱220,000	
12	June 7, 2026	50 Gen X and Millennial Singles #EverybodySingleEra #EverybodySingSelfLove	The ChooSing One	"Stay" by Carol Banawa	5	Yes	Yes	No	Yes	Yes	Yes	Yes	Yes	Yes	Yes	78 secs.	"Ganyan Talaga Ang Pag-Ibig" by April Boys	"Mahal Kita, Mahal Mo Siya, Mahal Nya Ay Iba" by Sharon Cuneta	₱220,000	
12	June 7, 2026	50 Gen X and Millennial Singles #EverybodySingleEra #EverybodySingSelfLove	Sing Tunog	"Karera" by BINI	4	No	No	Yes	Yes	No	Yes	No	No	No	Yes	78 secs.	"Kastilyong Buhangin" by Basil Valdez	"Bakit Pa Ba" by Jay R	₱220,000	
12	June 7, 2026	50 Gen X and Millennial Singles #EverybodySingleEra #EverybodySingSelfLove	Ayu-Sing Mo	"Leaves" by Ben&Ben	3	No	Yes	Yes	Yes	Yes	No	Yes	No	No	No	78 secs.	"Antukin" by Rico Blanco	"Sikulo" by Angela Ken, Maki, and Nhiko Sabiniano	₱220,000	
Guests: Iyah Mina and Petite (Episodes 11 and 12); Ayegee Paredes (Episode 11 Resident Jammer); Karla Estrada (Episode 11, Singko Blanko); Carmelle Collado (Episode 12)

Week 7 (June 13–14, 2026)
Episode	Airing date	Songbayanan	Preliminary rounds														Jackpot round (Everybody GuesSing)		Prize won	Ref.
Episode	Airing date	Songbayanan	Game	Song	SONGpu											Timer	Songs		Prize won	Ref.
Episode	Airing date	Songbayanan	Game	Song	Row	1	2	3	4	5	6	7	8	9	10	Timer	Songs		Prize won	Ref.
13	June 13, 2026	50 Food Bazaar Crew #EverybodySingFoodTrip #EverybodySingBazaarBites	Sing in the Blank	"Total Eclipse of the Heart" by Bonnie Tyler	5	No	No	No	No	Yes	No	No	No	No	Yes	85 secs.	"Baliw" by Maymay Entrata and Edward Barber	"Para-paraan" by Nadine Lustre	₱180,000	
13	June 13, 2026	50 Food Bazaar Crew #EverybodySingFoodTrip #EverybodySingBazaarBites	LipSing	"Maghihintay Ako" by Jona Viray	4	Yes	Yes	Yes	No	No	Yes	Yes	Yes	Yes	Yes	85 secs.	"No Way to Treat a Heart" by Martin Nievera	"Happy Birthday"	₱180,000	
14	June 14, 2026	50 Food Bazaar Crew #EverybodySingFoodTrip #EverybodySingBazaarBites	The ChooSing One	"Tumitigil ang Mundo" by BGYO	1	Yes	Yes	Yes	Yes	Yes	Yes	Yes	Yes	Yes	Yes	85 secs.	"Leron Leron Sinta"	"Somewhere In My Past" by Julie Vega	₱180,000	
14	June 14, 2026	50 Food Bazaar Crew #EverybodySingFoodTrip #EverybodySingBazaarBites	A-B-Sing	"Kabilang Buhay" by Bandang Lapis	3	No	No	Yes	Yes	Yes	Yes	Yes	Yes	Yes	Yes	85 secs.	"Panalangin" by APO Hiking Society	"How Did You Know" by Gary Valenciano	₱180,000	
14	June 14, 2026	50 Food Bazaar Crew #EverybodySingFoodTrip #EverybodySingBazaarBites	ReverSing	"Maging Sino Ka Man" by Kim Molina	2	Yes	Yes	Yes	Yes	Yes	No	No	No	Yes	Yes	85 secs.	"Close To You" by Sam Milby	"Namumula" by Maki	₱180,000	
Guests: Iyah Mina (Episodes 13 and 14); Makki Lucino (Episode 13 Resident Jammer); Brent Manalo (Episode 13, Singko Blanko); BGYO (Episode 14)

Week 8 (July 4-5, 2026)
Episode	Airing date	Songbayanan	Preliminary rounds														Jackpot round (Everybody GuesSing)		Prize won	Ref.
Episode	Airing date	Songbayanan	Game	Song	SONGpu											Timer	Songs		Prize won	Ref.
Episode	Airing date	Songbayanan	Game	Song	Row	1	2	3	4	5	6	7	8	9	10	Timer	Songs		Prize won	Ref.
15	July 4, 2026	50 Online Couples #EverybodySingHeart #EverybodySingMine	Sing in the Blank	"How Am I Supposed to Live Without You" by Laura Branigan	2	Yes	Yes	No	Yes	Yes	Yes	Yes	No	No	Yes	69 secs.	"Totoy Bibo" by Vhong Navarro	"Mobe" by Enrique Gil	₱1,020,000	
15	July 4, 2026	50 Online Couples #EverybodySingHeart #EverybodySingMine	Lights, Camera, Act-Sing	"Ewan" by Imago	3	Yes	Yes	No	Yes	Yes	Yes	Yes	No	No	No	69 secs.	"Mga Anghel na Walang Langit" by Kristel Fulgar	"Paraluman" by Adie	₱1,020,000	
16	July 5, 2026	50 Online Couples #EverybodySingHeart #EverybodySingMine	The ChooSing One	"Hawak Kamay" by Yeng Constantino	4	Yes	Yes	Yes	Yes	Yes	Yes	Yes	Yes	Yes	Yes	69 secs.	"Paano Ba ang Magmahal" by Piolo Pascual and Sarah Geronimo	"Isang Mundo, Isang Awit" by Leah Navarro	₱1,020,000	
16	July 5, 2026	50 Online Couples #EverybodySingHeart #EverybodySingMine	LipSing	"Gusto Ko Nang Bumitaw" by Morissette	5	Yes	No	No	Yes	No	Yes	No	Yes	No	Yes	69 secs.	"Malaya" by Moira dela Torre	"Tong Tong Tong Pakitong Kitong"	₱1,020,000	
16	July 5, 2026	50 Online Couples #EverybodySingHeart #EverybodySingMine	ReverSing	"Bawat Daan" by Ebe Dancel	1	No	No	Yes	No	Yes	Yes	No	No	No	No	69 secs.	"Love Has Come My Way" by Heart Evangelista	"Cool Off" by SessiOnroad	₱1,020,000	
Guests: Iyah Mina and Lassy Marquez (Episodes 15 and 16); Makki Lucino (Episodes 15 and 16 Resident Jammer); Gladys Reyes (Episode 15, Singko Blanko); Yeng Constantino (Episode 16)

Week 9 (July 11–12, 2026)
Episode	Airing date	Songbayanan	Preliminary rounds														Jackpot round (Everybody GuesSing)		Prize won	Ref.
Episode	Airing date	Songbayanan	Game	Song	SONGpu											Timer	Songs		Prize won	Ref.
Episode	Airing date	Songbayanan	Game	Song	Row	1	2	3	4	5	6	7	8	9	10	Timer	Songs		Prize won	Ref.
17	July 11, 2026	50 Mag-Lolo at Mag-Lola #EverybodySingLoloAtLola #EverybodySingApo	Sing in the Blank	"Kahit Maputi na Ang Buhok Ko" by Rey Valera	1	No	Yes	Yes	Yes	Yes	Yes	Yes	Yes	Yes	Yes	82 secs.	"Isang Linggong Pag-ibig" by Imelda Papin	"Stars" by Callalily	₱200,000	
17	July 11, 2026	50 Mag-Lolo at Mag-Lola #EverybodySingLoloAtLola #EverybodySingApo	Lights, Camera, Act-Sing	"Basang-Basa sa Ulan" by Aegis	3	No	Yes	No	No	Yes	Yes	Yes	Yes	No	Yes	82 secs.	"Kaliwete" by Eraserheads	"Hindi Kita Malilimutan" by Basil Valdez	₱200,000	
18	July 12, 2026	50 Mag-Lolo at Mag-Lola #EverybodySingLoloAtLola #EverybodySingApo	LipSing	"With a Smile" by Regine Velasquez	5	Yes	Yes	Yes	Yes	Yes	Yes	Yes	No	No	Yes	82 secs.	"Sampung Mga Daliri"	"Tag-Araw" by AfterImage	₱200,000	
18	July 12, 2026	50 Mag-Lolo at Mag-Lola #EverybodySingLoloAtLola #EverybodySingApo	The ChooSing One	"Patuloy ang Pangarap" by Angeline Quinto	4	Yes	Yes	Yes	Yes	Yes	Yes	Yes	Yes	Yes	Yes	82 secs.	"Panaginip Lang" by Alex Gonzaga	"Bituing Walang Ningning" by Sharon Cuneta	₱200,000	
18	July 12, 2026	50 Mag-Lolo at Mag-Lola #EverybodySingLoloAtLola #EverybodySingApo	ReverSing	"Salamat" by The Dawn	2	No	Yes	No	No	Yes	No	Yes	Yes	No	No	82 secs.	"Ang Boyfriend Kong Baduy" by Cinderella	"Hanggang May Kailanman" by Carol Banawa	₱200,000	
Guests: Iyah Mina and Lassy Marquez (Episodes 17 & 18); Makki Lucino (Episodes 17 & 18 Resident Jammer); Fyang Smith and JM Ibarra (Episode 17, Singko Blanko); Angeline Quinto (Episode 18)

Week 10 (August 22–23, 2026)
Episode	Airing date	Songbayanan	Preliminary rounds														Jackpot round (Everybody GuesSing)		Prize won	Ref.
Episode	Airing date	Songbayanan	Game	Song	SONGpu											Timer	Songs		Prize won	Ref.
Episode	Airing date	Songbayanan	Game	Song	Row	1	2	3	4	5	6	7	8	9	10	Timer	Songs		Prize won	Ref.
19	August 22, 2026	50 Event Hosts and Performers #EverybodySingEvents #EverybodySingPerformers	Sing in the Blank	"Pangarap Ko ang Ibigin Ka" by Morissette	5	No	Yes	No	Yes	Yes	Yes	No	Yes	Yes	Yes	82 secs.	"Iskul Bukol" by Tito Sotto, Vic Sotto and Joey de Leon	"Magsimula Ka" by Leo Valdez	₱200,000	
19	August 22, 2026	50 Event Hosts and Performers #EverybodySingEvents #EverybodySingPerformers	LipSing	"Tala" by Sarah Geronimo	4	Yes	No	Yes	No	Yes	Yes	No	Yes	Yes	Yes	82 secs.	"From The Start" by Rachelle Ann Go	"Cherry on Top" by Bini	₱200,000	
20	August 23, 2026	50 Event Hosts and Performers #EverybodySingEvents #EverybodySingPerformers	The ChooSing One	"Amakabogera" by Maymay Entrata	2	Yes	Yes	Yes	Yes	Yes	Yes	Yes	Yes	Yes	Yes	82 secs.	"Walang Hanggan" by Ella May Saison	"Panaginip" by Morissette	₱200,000	
20	August 23, 2026	50 Event Hosts and Performers #EverybodySingEvents #EverybodySingPerformers	PicSing a Broken Song	"Lason Mong Halik" by Katrina Velarde	1	Yes	Yes	No	No	Yes	Yes	Yes	Yes	Yes	Yes	82 secs.	"Gusto Na Kitang Makita" by SessiOnroad	"Totoy Bibbo" by Vhong Navarro	₱200,000	
20	August 23, 2026	50 Event Hosts and Performers #EverybodySingEvents #EverybodySingPerformers	Ayu-Sing Mo	"Salamin, Salamin" by BINI	3	No	No	No	No	Yes	Yes	Yes	No	No	Yes	82 secs.	"P.S. I Love You" by Sharon Cuneta	"Without You" by Introvoys	₱200,000	
Guests: Iyah Mina and Petite (Episodes 19 and 20); Ayegee Paredes (Episode 19 and 20 Resident Jammer); Esnyr (Episode 19, Singko Blanko); Maymay Entrata (Episode 20)

Week 11 (September 5–6, 2026)
Episode	Airing date	Songbayanan	Preliminary rounds														Jackpot round (Everybody GuesSing)		Prize won	Ref.
Episode	Airing date	Songbayanan	Game	Song	SONGpu											Timer	Songs		Prize won	Ref.
Episode	Airing date	Songbayanan	Game	Song	Row	1	2	3	4	5	6	7	8	9	10	Timer	Songs		Prize won	Ref.
21	September 5, 2026	50 Mag-Best Friends #EverybodySingBFF #EverybodySingBesties	Sing in the Blank	"Because You Loved Me" by Celine Dion	3	No	No	Yes	No	Yes	Yes	Yes	Yes	No	Yes	88 secs.	"Annie Batungbakal" by Hotdog	"Habang Buhay" by Zack Tabudlo	₱200,000	
21	September 5, 2026	50 Mag-Best Friends #EverybodySingBFF #EverybodySingBesties	LipSing	"Palagi" by TJ Monterde and KZ Tandingan	4	Yes	Yes	Yes	Yes	Yes	Yes	Yes	Yes	Yes	Yes	88 secs.	"Miss Miss" by Rob Deniel	"Malayo Pa ang Umaga" by Rey Valera	₱200,000	
22	September 6, 2026	50 Mag-Best Friends #EverybodySingBFF #EverybodySingBesties	The ChooSing One	"I've Fallen For You" by Jamie Rivera	5	Yes	Yes	Yes	Yes	Yes	Yes	Yes	Yes	Yes	Yes	88 secs.	"Sana Ikaw" by Piolo Pascual	"Bugambilya" by Belle Mariano	₱200,000	
22	September 6, 2026	50 Mag-Best Friends #EverybodySingBFF #EverybodySingBesties	Sing Tunog	"Umiiyak ang Puso" by Angeline Quinto	2	Yes	Yes	Yes	No	Yes	Yes	Yes	Yes	Yes	Yes	88 secs.	"Dahan Dahan Dahan Lang" by Ylona Garcia	"Mas Mabuti Pa" by Janine Berdin	₱200,000	
22	September 6, 2026	50 Mag-Best Friends #EverybodySingBFF #EverybodySingBesties	Ayu-Sing Mo	"Maling Akala" by Brownman Revival	1	No	Yes	Yes	No	Yes	No	No	No	No	Yes	88 secs.	"Banal Na Aso, Santong Kabayo" by Yano	"Ilagay Mo Kid" by Hagibis	₱200,000	
Guests: Iyah Mina and Makki Lucino (Episodes 21 and 22); Ayegee Paredes (Episode 21 and 22 Resident Jammer); Alexa Ilacad (Episode 21, Singko Blanko); Jamie Rivera (Episode 22)

Week 12 (September 19–20, 2026)
Episode	Airing date	Songbayanan	Preliminary rounds														Jackpot round (Everybody GuesSing)		Prize won	Ref.
Episode	Airing date	Songbayanan	Game	Song	SONGpu											Timer	Songs		Prize won	Ref.
Episode	Airing date	Songbayanan	Game	Song	Row	1	2	3	4	5	6	7	8	9	10	Timer	Songs		Prize won	Ref.
23	September 19, 2026	50 Baristas #EverybodySingCoffee #EverybodySingBarista	Sing in the Blank	"I Don't Want to Miss a Thing" by Regine Velasquez	3	No	Yes	No	Yes	Yes	No	Yes	No	No	No	72 secs.	"Beer" by Itchyworms	"Ang Gaan ng Feeling" by Geneva Cruz	₱200,000	
23	September 19, 2026	50 Baristas #EverybodySingCoffee #EverybodySingBarista	Lights, Camera, Act-Sing	"Bakit Labis Kitang Mahal" by Lea Salonga	4	No	No	No	Yes	No	Yes	Yes	Yes	No	No	72 secs.	"Ngayon at Kailanman" by Basil Valdez	"Tama Na" by Darren Espanto	₱200,000	
24	September 20, 2026	50 Baristas #EverybodySingCoffee #EverybodySingBarista	The ChooSing One	"Pusong Ligaw" by Jona Viray	1	Yes	No	Yes	Yes	Yes	Yes	Yes	Yes	No	Yes	72 secs.	"Chuva Choo Choo" by Jolina Magdangal	"Ligaya" by Sitti	₱200,000	
24	September 20, 2026	50 Baristas #EverybodySingCoffee #EverybodySingBarista	LipSing	"Akin Ka Na Lang" by Morissette	5	Yes	No	Yes	Yes	Yes	Yes	Yes	Yes	Yes	Yes	72 secs.	"Isa Lang" by Arthur Nery	"Siping" by Cup of Joe	₱200,000	
24	September 20, 2026	50 Baristas #EverybodySingCoffee #EverybodySingBarista	Ayu-Sing Mo	"Tibok" by Earl Agustin	2	No	No	No	Yes	No	Yes	Yes	Yes	Yes	No	72 secs.	"I Am But a Small Voice" by Lea Salonga	"Lumang Tugtugin" by Iñigo Pascual	₱200,000	
Guests: Iyah Mina and Makki Lucino (Episodes 23 and 24); Ayegee Paredes (Episode 23 and 24 Resident Jammer); Jarren Garcia (Episode 23, Singko Blanko); Jona Viray (Episode 24)

Week 13 (October 3–4, 2026)
Episode	Airing date	Songbayanan	Preliminary rounds														Jackpot round (Everybody GuesSing)		Prize won	Ref.
Episode	Airing date	Songbayanan	Game	Song	SONGpu											Timer	Songs		Prize won	Ref.
Episode	Airing date	Songbayanan	Game	Song	Row	1	2	3	4	5	6	7	8	9	10	Timer	Songs		Prize won	Ref.
25	October 3, 2026	50 Baseco, Manila Residents #EverybodySingBaseco #EverybodySingTogether	Sing in the Blank	"Sinta" by Aegis	3	Yes	Yes	Yes	Yes	No	No	Yes	Yes	Yes	Yes	104 secs.	"Kung Alam Mo Lang" by Bandang Lapis	"Hiwaga" by Alexa Ilacad and KD Estrada	₱100,000	
25	October 3, 2026	50 Baseco, Manila Residents #EverybodySingBaseco #EverybodySingTogether	Lights, Camera, Act-Sing	"Bakit Nga Ba Mahal Kita" by Gigi de Lana	2	No	Yes	Yes	Yes	Yes	Yes	No	Yes	Yes	Yes	104 secs.	"Kasalanan Ba" by Men Oppose	"Kumusta Ka" by Rey Valera	₱100,000	
26	October 4, 2026	50 Baseco, Manila Residents #EverybodySingBaseco #EverybodySingTogether	The ChooSing One	"Tunay na Mahal" by Lani Misalucha	4	Yes	Yes	Yes	Yes	Yes	Yes	Yes	Yes	Yes	Yes	104 secs.	"Nadarang" by Shanti Dope	"Oooh Lala Baby" by Baby Dolls	₱100,000	
26	October 4, 2026	50 Baseco, Manila Residents #EverybodySingBaseco #EverybodySingTogether	Sing Tunog	"Mahal Pa Rin Kita" by Angeline Quinto	5	Yes	No	Yes	Yes	Yes	Yes	Yes	Yes	Yes	Yes	104 secs.	"Till I Found You" by Freestyle	"Love Without Time" by Nonoy Zuñiga	₱100,000	
26	October 4, 2026	50 Baseco, Manila Residents #EverybodySingBaseco #EverybodySingTogether	Ayu-Sing Mo	"Hari ng Sablay" by Sugarfree	1	Yes	Yes	Yes	Yes	Yes	Yes	No	No	Yes	Yes	104 secs.	"Kahel na Langit" by Maki	"Somewhere In My Past" by Julie Vega	₱100,000	
Guests: Iyah Mina and Makki Lucino (Episodes 25 and 26); Ayegee Paredes (Episode 25 and 26 Resident Jammer); Janine Gutierrez and Jericho Rosales (Episode 25, Singko Blanko); Lani Misalucha (Episode 26)
