= Filipino Music Awards 2026 =

2026 awards ceremony for music

- Official poster
- Date: October 6, 2026
- Venue: SM Mall of Asia Arena; Pasay, Metro Manila
- Country: Philippines
- Presented by: AGC Power Holdings Corporation
- Hosted by: Joey Mead King; Billy Crawford; KC Montero

Highlights
- Most wins: SB19 (3)
- Most nominations: IV of Spades (9)
- Total: 18 categories
- Website: filipinomusicawards.com

The 2nd Filipino Music Awards is a music awards ceremony that honors the best of Filipino music over the past year. The ceremony is presented by AGC Power Holdings Corporation (AGCPHC), and happened last October 6, 2026, at the SM Mall of Asia Arena in Pasay, Metro Manila. The Filipino Music Awards (FMAs) presents the 18 categories. Model Joey Mead King reprised her role as host, joined by actors Billy Crawford and KC Montero.

For its second year, SB19 once again emerged as the big winners with 3 wins, including a back-to-back win for Concert of the Year for Wakas at Simula: The Trilogy Concert Finale, and People's Choice Award for Artist of the Year and Song of the Year for "Visa".

Followed by 2 awards both won by Bini, including the Artist of the Year and Tour of the Year for Signals World Tour 2026, and Skusta Clee and Flow G, with their hit collaboration "Since Day One", that received both Song of the Year and Hip-Hop Song of the Year.

Regine Velasquez received the Lifetime Achievement Award, while Francis Magalona received posthomously the Tribute Award.

It is the second time the awards have been held at the arena. The awards has introduced a new category, Breakthrough Artist of the Year. Filipino pop rock band IV of Spades earned the most nominations (9), with several other acts such as Bini, Cup of Joe, Maki, and SB19 also earning multiple nominations. The ceremony also featured various performances from different Filipino artists.

== Winners and nominees ==
The complete list of nominees was revealed on September 15, 2026. Winners are listed first, highlighted in boldface, and indicated with a double dagger (‡).

=== Grand Awards ===
**Artist of the Year**: **Bini ‡**; Cup of Joe; IV of Spades; Maki; SB19	**Album of the Year**: **Kolorcoaster – Maki ‡**; Wakas at Simula – SB19; Signals – Bini; Lab Songs ng mga Tanga – Janine Berdin; Andalucia – IV of Spades
**Song of the Year**: "**Since Day One" – Skusta Clee featuring Flow G ‡**; "Kabisado" – IV of Spades; "Lifetime (Reimagined)" – Ben&Ben; "Palayo sa Mundo" – Jolianne and Arthur Nery; "Tahanan" – El Manu	**Breakthrough Artist of the Year**: **Fitterkarma ‡**; Janine Berdin; Ashtine Olviga; Baby Dolls; Kaia
**Concert of the Year**: **Wakas at Simula: The Trilogy Concert Finale – SB19 ‡**; Get, Get, Aw! The SexBomb Concert Rawnd 3 – SexBomb Girls; In Between – TJ Monterde and KZ Tandingan; Sandali: The Cup of Joe Fest – Cup of Joe; IV of Spades: Live at the MOA Arena – IV of Spades	**Tour of the Year**: **Signals World Tour 2026 – Bini ‡**; In Between Tour – TJ Monterde and KZ Tandingan; Stardust – Cup of Joe; The Grace Tour – Dionela; Andalucia Tour – IV of Spades

=== Genre Awards ===
**Pop Song of the Year**: **"Baduy" – Vvink, DJ Love, and Pio Balbuena**; "Unang Kilig" – Bini; "Oooh Lala Baby" – Baby Dolls; "Hulog" – Kaia; "Habangbuhay Pansamantala" – Maki	**Rock Song of the Year**: "**What Would It Take (For You to Realize the True Evil in This World?)" – Typecast ‡**; "Rarara" – Dilaw; "What If I Miss You for the Rest of My Life?" – Janine Berdin; "Trip Lang" – One Click Straight featuring Raymund Marasigan; "Monster" – IV of Spades
**R&B Song of the Year**: **"Love Again" – Denise Julia ‡ and**; **"Sinigang" – Alamat ‡ (tied)**; "Giliw" – Fern featuring Al James and Kyla; "Palayo sa Mundo" – Jolianne and Arthur Nery; "Ayoko Maging Kaibigan" – Kinddotin	**Hip-hop Song of the Year**: **"Since Day One" – Skusta Clee featuring Flow G ‡**; "Moolah" – Scoop Dogg and Daarth; "Palaisipan" – Loonie and Arthur Nery; "Summer Crush" – Hellmerry; "Origimal" – Uncle Dags featuring RJD
**Folk Song of the Year**: **"Lifetime (Reimagined)" – Ben&Ben ‡**; "Baka Bukas" – Angela Ken; "Sayo Lang" – Shirebound; "Kung Masusunod" – Jan Roberts featuring Johnoy Danao; "The One to Blame" – Clara Benin	**Alternative Song of the Year**: **"Kabisado" – IV of Spades ‡**; "Aswang sa Maynila" – Fitterkarma featuring Novocrane; "Katabi" – Suyen; "19 Underground" – Ena Mori; "Sandali" – Cup of Joe

=== People's Choice Awards ===
**People's Choice Awards – Artist**: **SB19 ‡**; IV of Spades; Fitterkarma; Maki; Janine Berdin; Flow G; Ashtine Olviga; Kaia; Xonara; Bini	**People's Choice Awards – Song**: **"Visa" – SB19 ‡**; "Since Day One" – Skusta Clee featuring Flow G; "Kabisado" – IV of Spades; "Tabi" – Xonara; "Blush" – Bini; "Oooh Lala Baby" – Baby Dolls; "Sandali" – Cup of Joe; "Habangbuhay Pansamantala" – Maki; "Halik Sobrang Diin Pt. 2" – Gat Putch featuring Louie Grammz, Mi'Kel; "Lifetime (Reimagined)" – Ben&Ben
**People's Choice Awards – International Artist**: **BTS ‡**; Olivia Rodrigo; Katseye; Olivia Dean; Bruno Mars; Harry Styles; Madonna; Dominic Fike; Ariana Grande; 5 Seconds of Summer

=== Special Awards ===
- Lifetime Achivement Award: Regine Velasquez
- Tribute Award: Francis Magalona (posthomous)
- Music Company of the Year: ABS-CBN Music
- Music Organization Award: Organisasyon ng Pilipinong Mang-aawit (OPM)
- Dove's Reborn Song Award: "Sulong" by Kaia

=== Artists with multiple nominations and awards ===
Artists with multiple nominations
Nominations	Artist
9	IV of Spades
6	Bini
5	Cup of Joe
5	Maki
5	SB19
4	Flow G
4	Janine Berdin
3	Arthur Nery
3	Baby Dolls
3	Ben&Ben
3	Fitterkarma
3	Skusta Clee
3	Kaia
2	Ashtine Olviga
2	Dionela
2	Jolianne
2	KZ Tandingan
2	TJ Monterde

Artists with multiple wins
Awards	Artist
3	SB19
2	Bini
2	Flow G
2	Skusta Clee

== Performers ==
- Alamat
- BGYO
- Erik Santos
- Flow G
- G22
- Gary Valenciano
- Iñigo Pascual
- Kaia
- Kamikazee
- Kyla
- Kyle Echarri
- Maki
- Parokya ni Edgar
- Skusta Clee
- Vxon
- Zephanie
