= 39th Awit Awards =

2026 award ceremony for Filipino music

- Teaser poster
- Date: September 16, 2026
- Venue: SM Mall of Asia Arena, Pasay
- Country: Philippines
- Presented by: Philippine Association of the Record Industry (PARI)
- Eligibility: 01 January 2025 to 31 December 2025
- Hosted by: Sam Y.G.
- Website: awitawards.com

Philippine coverage
- Produced by: PARI and Go Live Asia
- Directed by: Paolo Valenciano; Nico Faustino

The 39th Awit Awards are Philippine music awards ceremony which honor the best recordings, compositions, and artists in 2025, presented by the Philippine Association of the Record Industry (PARI), was held on September 16, 2026. It is the 39th ceremony which celebrated at the SM Mall of Asia Arena in Pasay City hosted by radio personality Sam Y.G..

The annual event were recognize outstanding achievements and excellence in Original Pilipino Music (OPM). Creative and show direction by directors Paolo Valenciano and Nico Faustino.

== Background ==
On 14 April 2026, PARI unveiled its roadmap for the future of the local music industry in a press conference held at Viva Café, led by its new president Enzo Valdez, who presented a comprehensive plan designed to benefit both industry stakeholders and music fans alike. To ensure a world-class production, PARI has partnered with Go Live Asia, a professional livestreaming company.

=== Program changes ===
- The Awit Awards Night is scheduled for September at the SM Mall of Asia Arena, while the Dangal ng Musikang Pilipino Awards will take place in October at the historic Goldenberg Mansion in Malacañang Palace. Lifetime Achievement Award will be united as part of the Dangal ng Musikang Pilipino Award.

=== Criteria amendments ===
- PARI said that this edition will be the most expansive and inclusive edition to date which, for the first time, opens entries to non-member artists, allowing independent musicians and their managers to submit nominations across categories.

=== Category changes ===
- Further elevating this year’s awards is the introduction of three new major categories: Best New Artist, Songwriter of the Year and Producer of the Year.

=== Voting amendments ===
- A key innovation was introduced through the creation of the Awit Voting Community (AVC), a body tasked with selecting final nominees and winners. Eligible AVC members will include Awit Awards judges and finalists from the past five years, as well as designated representatives from PARI’s corporate and associate member labels—ensuring a credible, experienced, and representative voting body.

== Nominees and winners ==
=== Grand awards ===
Below are the nominees and winners. The winners are listed first and in bold.

**Album of the Year**: **"Andalucia" – IV of Spades**; "Kolorcoaster" – Maki; "Lab Songs ng mga Tanga" – Janine Berdin; "Love on Loop" – Lola Amour; "Silakbo" – Cup of Joe; "Simula at Wakas" – SB19	**Record of the Year**: **"Pag-Ibig ay Kanibalismo II" – Fitterkarma**; "DAM" – SB19; "Ikigai" – Dionela feat. Loonie; "Konsensya" – IV of Spades; "Monster" – IV of Spades; "Saranggola" – Ben&Ben
**Song of the Year**: **"Aura" – IV of Spades**; "Dungka!" – SB19; "Ikigai" – Dionela feat. Loonie; "Kabisado" – IV of Spades; "Kahel na Langit" – Maki; "Pag-Ibig ay Kanibalismo II" – Fitterkarma	**Songwriter of the Year**: **John Paulo Nase**; Zild Benitez; Joao de Leon; Tim Dionela; Lola Amour; Joshua Daniel Nase; Marlon Peroramas; Blaster Silonga
**Producer of the Year**: **Brian Lotho**; IV of Spades; Tim Dionela; Shadiel Chan; John Paulo Nase; Joshua Daniel Nase	**Best New Artist**: **Nicole – "Panaginip"**; Gab Cabangon – "Pisces"; It All Started In May – "O' Kay Tamis"; Jamiela – "Bendahe"; New Lore – "Grief Cake"; Vvink – "Baduy" (with DJ Love [Sherwin Tuna] feat. Pio Balbuena)

=== Performance awards ===
**Best Performance by a Solo Artist**: **"What if I miss you for the rest of my life?" – Janine Berdin**; "Clue" – Noel Cabangon; "Healing (Somebody I Might Fly)" – Rico Blanco; "Kahel na Langit" – Maki; "Nandito Ako" – Rob Deniel; "Nasusunog (Pants on Fire)" – Dwta; "Sa'yo" – Jay R	**Best Performance by a Group Artist**: **"Saranggola" – Ben&Ben**; "Dahan" – Over October; "DAM" – SB19; "Monster" – IV of Spades; "Pag-Ibig ay Kanibalismo II" – Fitterkarma; "Shagidi" – Bini; "Telepono" – One Click Straight
**Best Collaboration**: **"Ikigai" – Dionela feat. Loonie**; "Ahon" – December Avenue feat. Morissette; "Kailan Ka Uuwi" – Juan Karlos and Flow G; "Pahinga" – James Reid and TJ Monterde; "Telepono" – One Click Straight feat. Clara Benin; "Umaaligid" – SB19 and Sarah Geronimo

=== Genre recording awards ===
**Best Ballad Recording**: **"What if I miss you for the rest of my life?" – Janine Berdin**; "Ahon" – Over October; "Ano Ba Talaga Tayo" – The Juans feat. Janine Berdin; "Nagmahal Lang Ako" – KZ Tandingan; "Time" – SB19; "With You" – Lola Amour	**Best Rock/Metal Recording**: **"Rupture" – Typecast**; "Biktima" – Chicosci; "Boys Night Out" – Wilabaliw; "Grace" – Faspitch; "MSK" – Kjwan; "Rarara" – Dilaw
**Best Alternative Recording**: **"Telepono" – One Click Straight**; "All U Wanna Do" – Barbie Almalbis; "Antoxic" – Janine Berdin; "Dahan" – Over October; "Kahel na Langit" – Maki; "Misbehave" – Lola Amour; "Pag-Ibig ay Kanibalismo II" – Fitterkarma	**Best Traditional/Contemporary Folk Recording**: **"Malalim ang Gabi" – Project Yazz**; "Gunigunita" – Natun; "Hardin" – Ila; "Nosi Ba Lasi" – EJ de Piero; "Pwede Bang Mamaya?" – Angela Ken; "Sayaw" – Ila; "Tahimik na Buhay Kapiling Ka" – Amiel Sol; "Tukso" – Halina
**Best World Music Recording**: **"Love on Loop" – Lola Amour**; "Hardin" – Luna & Apollo ft. Alfredo Engay Jr; "Titingin-Tingin" – Sitti; "Sounds of Splashing Stones" – Hattus; "The Mighty People" – Hemp Republic; "Linlang" – Hemp Republic; "Reprise" – The Ridleys	**Best Jazz Recording**: **"Yamot-Ennui" – Project Yazz**; "Let Our Love" – Nicole Asensio and Solo Cal; "Life at 29" – Leanne & Naara; "Reto Na Naman" – Zia Quizon; "Sidecar" – Alvin Cornista; "Talipanan Sunset" – Alvin Cornista; "The Awakening" – Kiss the Bride
**Best R&B Recording**: **"Ikigai" – Dionela feat. Loonie**; "Ayaw-baya" – Arthur Nery; "Baby, Wag Mo 'Kong Ismallin (Medium Ako)" – Brass Pas Pas Pas Pas; "Katabi" – Bini; "Life at 29" – Leanne & Naara; "Magic" – Jason Dhakal; "Palayo sa Mundo" – Arthur Nery and Jolianne; "Para Pilitin Ka" – Jikamarie and Skusta Clee; "Stand Up" – Kyla	**Best Rock/Hip hop Recording**: **"Ikigai" – Dionela feat. Loonie**; "Ambag" – Gloc-9 feat. Shockra; "Anak Ka ng Pu" – Morobeats; "Halimaw" – Gloc-9 feat. Smugglaz, Hero, and Abaddon; "Kailan Ka Uuwi" – Juan Karlos, Skusta Clee; "Man in the Mirror" – Waiian; "Take It To The Roof" – Playertwo, Lola Amour
**Best Dance/Electronic Recording**: **"Dungka!" – SB19**; "8TonBall" – SB19; "La Loba" – Ena Mori; "Misbehave" – Lola Amour; "Moshpit" – Novacrane; "Umaaligid" – SB19 and Sarah Geronimo; "Walang Kaba" – Marina Summers	**Best Pop Recording**: **"Dungka!" – SB19**; "Saranggola" – Ben&Ben; "DAM" – SB19; "Dahan" – Over October; "Langit Lupa" – Dwta; "Shagidi" – Bini

=== Technical awards ===
**Best Sound Engineer Recording**: **"Monster" – IV of Spades**; **IV of Spades, arranger**; Antoxic – Janine Berdin; Janine Berdin, Ben Ayes, and JGreg, arrangers; "Ako Naman Muna" – Angela Ken; Syd Hartha, arranger; "Ash Valentine" – Party Pace; Party Pace, arranger; "Ikigai" – Dionela feat. Loonie; Tim Dionela, arranger; "MSK" – Kjwan; Kjwan, arranger; "Silakbo" – Cup of Joe; Cup of Joe, Jovel Rivera, and Abner Badua, arrangers	**Best Musical Arrangement**: **"Saranggola" – Ben&Ben**; **Poch Barretto, Pat Lasaten, Agnes Reoma, Toni Muñoz, Jam Villanueva, Andrew de Pano, Keifer Cabugao, Paolo Benjamin, and Miguel Benjamin, producers**; "DAM" – SB19; John Paulo Nase, Joshua Daniel Nase, and Simon Servida, arrangers; "Ikigai" – Dionela feat. Loonie; Tim Dionela, arranger; "Monster" – IV of Spades; Unique Salonga, Zild Benitez, and Blaster Silonga, arrangers; "Suliranin" – IV of Spades; Unique Salonga, arranger; "Telepono" – One Click Straight; One Click Straight, arranger
**Best Vocal Arrangement**: **"Ikigai" – Dionela feat. Loonie**; **Tim Dionela, arranger**; "Dahan" – Over October; Joshua Rafael Buizon, Joshua Caleb Lua, Janessa Geronimo, Jaric Canlas, and Anton Rodriguez, arranger; "Kailan Ka Uuwi" – Juan Karlos and Flow G; Juan Karlos and JGreg, arrangers; "What if I miss you for the rest of my life?" – Janine Berdin; Janine Berdin, JGreg, Xergio Ramos, Emil dela Rosa, TJ Castillon, Luke Casanova, and Kirk Basilio, arrangers	**Best Remix Recording**: **"Sabi Ko Na" – Yara feat. Nateman**; **Yung Bawal, remixer**; "Daleng Dale" – GAT; Theo Mortel, remixer; "Hot Maria Clara (Remix)" – Sanya Lopez; FIO, remixer; "Jumbo Hotdog (Budots Remix)" – Masculados; DJ Love, remixer; "Prisoner of the Mind (Analog Remix)" – The Howler Project; Marco de Leon, remixer; "Walang Pake (Remix)" – Vurse; Theo Mortel, remixer
**Best Cover Art**: **"Not That Girl" – Barbie Almalbis**; **Martin Honasan, graphic designer**; "Langit Lupa" – Dwta; Dwta, Elyandre Dagli, graphic designer; "The Mighty People" – Hemp Republic; Happy Navarro, arranger; "Aura" – IV of Spades; Shaira Luna, graphic designer and photographer; ""Simula at Wakas" – SB19; Louis Duran, Iona Forbes, and 1032 Labs, graphic designers; "Lab Songs ng mga Tanga" – Janine Berdin; Helena Troy Nonato, graphic designer	**Best Music Video**: **"Dungka!" – SB19**; **Kerbs Balagtas, director**; "Aura" – IV of Spades; Roliug, director; "DAM" – SB19; Alanshiii, director; "Diving" – Zack Tabudlo; Zack Tabudlo and Enzo Valdez, directors; "Shelter of the Broken" – Ice Seguerra; Ice Seguerra and Liza Diño, directors; "Kahel na Langit" – Maki; Maki and Ingrid Ignacio, directors
