= Ako Ang Bagyo =

Single by Shean
- Language: Filipino
- English title: I Am the Storm
- Released: October 2, 2026
- Length: 4:31
- Label: N/A
- Songwriter: Shean Lucena
- Producers: corrgtd; Pao Lofranco

"Ako Ang Bagyo" (lit. 'I Am the Storm'; stylized in lowercase) is the debut single by Filipino singer-songwriter Shean. It was released on October 2, 2026.

== Composition ==
"Ako Ang Bagyo" is four minutes and thirty-one seconds long. It was inspired by Shean's personal experience with unrequited love and explores the emotional difficulty of seeing someone he deeply cares about find happiness with another person. The song uses the imagery of an approaching storm as a metaphor for heartbreak, portraying it as furious, restless, and increasingly difficult to contain.

== Charts ==
Weekly chart performance for "Ako Ang Bagyo"
Chart (2026)	Peak position
Philippines (IFPI)	2
Philippines Hot 100 (Billboard Philippines)	2
Philippines Top Songs (Billboard Philippines)	2

== Credits and personnel ==
Credits are adapted from Spotify.

- Shean Lucena - vocals, composer, lyricist
- corggtd - co-producer, mixing engineer
- Pao Lofranco - co-producer
- Andreah - associate producer, background vocals
