= Aswang sa Maynila =

Single by Fitterkarma featuring Kai Sevillano of Novocrane

from the album kung tayo’y nasa isang horror na pelikula, tiyak ako ang una mong papatayin
- Language: Filipino
- Released: February 13, 2026
- Genre: Alternative rock; pop rock
- Length: 2:43
- Label: ONErpm
- Songwriter: Joao de Leon
- Producer: Xergio Ramos

Fitterkarma singles chronology
"Sumpa" (2025)	"Aswang sa Maynila" (2026)

"Aswang sa Maynila" is a song by Filipino alternative rock band Fitterkarma. It was written by vocalist Joao de Leon, and released on February 13, 2026, as the band's first single of the year. The song features guest vocals from Kai Sevillano of Novocrane, marking the band's first collaboration with another artist.

== Background and release ==
After the success of "Kalapastangan" (2023) and "Pag-Ibig ay Kanibalismo II" (2025), Fitterkarma announced "Aswang sa Maynila" in January 2026. The single was released on digital streaming platforms on February 13, 2026.

A launch event titled Bangungot: Aswang Sa Maynila Single Launch was held on February 14, 2026, at 123 Block in Mandaluyong. The event was produced by the band in partnership with GNN and ONErpm Philippines. It featured an extended set from Fitterkarma and performances from Novocrane, shirebound, Halina, Bita and the Botflies, and Lions & Acrobats.

== Composition and lyrics ==
"Aswang sa Maynila" was written by Joao de Leon, with contributions from Sophia Anne Miranda, Sanders Bayas, and Lawrence Mikkel Mendoza. Production, recording, and mixing were handled by Xergio Ramos.

The song incorporates Japanese rock influences and heavier alternative elements. The lyrics refer to emotional distance within a relationship. The title references the aswang from Philippine folklore. Guest vocals on the track were performed by Kai Sevillano of Novocrane.

== Reception ==
Elijah Pareño of Rolling Stone Philippines, wrote that "Aswang sa Maynila" features guest vocals Sevillano and includes guitar-driven instrumentation. He noted that the song draws from Japanese rock in its melody and pace, while incorporating elements of pop rock and a supernatural theme.

== Credits and personnel ==
Credits adapted from Apple Music.

Musicians

- Joao de Leon – vocals, songwriting
- Kylene Sevillano – vocals
- Lawrence Mikkel Mendoza – electric guitar
- Sophia Anne Miranda – bass guitar
- Sanders Bayas – drums

Production

- Xergio Ramos – producer, electric guitar, mixing engineer, recording engineer
- Daniel Monong – recording engineer
- Caleb Madison – mastering engineer
