= Isa Lang =

Single by Arthur Nery
- Released: December 16, 2021
- Genre: R&B; soul
- Length: 4:29
- Label: Viva
- Songwriter: Arthur Nery
- Producer: Axel Fernandez

Arthur Nery singles chronology
"Pagsamo" (2021)	"Isa Lang" (2021)	"Sinag (feat. Samantha Benwick)" (2022)

Music video
- "Isa Lang" on YouTube

"Isa Lang" (lit. 'Just One') is a song by Filipino singer-songwriter Arthur Nery. It was released as a single on December 16, 2021, through Viva Records. It is a R&B and soul track that portrays a candid perspective of someone desiring reciprocal feelings from their crush. The music video features Kaila Estrada, and depicts a slow-burning romance between the two leads, characterized by the gradual buildup of romantic tension.

== Composition ==
"Isa Lang" is four minutes and twenty-nine seconds long. Written by Arthur Nery and produced by Axel Fernandez, it is a R&B and soul track that portrays a candid perspective of someone desiring reciprocal feelings from their crush.

Musically, the track was described as effectively combines "doubt and certainty" within its melancholic verses and intricate R&B hooks.

== Music video ==
On July 18, 2025, the music video for the single was released, nearly four years after its track release, and features Kaila Estrada. In the music video, it depicts a slow-burning romance between the two leads, characterized by the gradual buildup of romantic tension.

In a press release, the music video for "Isa Lang" revitalizes the track through the involvement of actress Kaila Estrada. Estrada's compelling presence imbues the visuals with emotional depth, effectively conveying the song's themes of vulnerability, yearning, and sorrow. The cinematic approach provides a poignant and faithful extension of the song's emotional narrative, designed to resonate with fans.

== Credits and personnel ==
Credits are adapted from Apple Music.

- Arthur Nery – vocals, songwriter, arranger
- Axel Fernandez – producer, mastering engineer, mixing engineer
- Lei Rodriguez – violin
- Sherwin Dacuyan – piano

== Charts ==
Chart performances for "Isa Lang"
Chart (2025)	Peak position
Philippines (IFPI)	10
Philippines (Philippines Hot 100)	10
Philippines (Top Philippine Songs)	6
