= Jason Dhakal =

- Born: 2000 (age 25–26); Muscat, Oman
- Origin: Philippines
- Genres: Indie R&B; Neo soul
- Years active: 2018–present
- Label: Warner

Jason Dhakal (born 2000) is a Filipino-Nepalese singer-songwriter. He is an active musician since 2018, known for his blend of R&B and neo-soul, notably for his releases including his debut EP Night In in 2018 and albums lovesound (2020), BEING (2023) and Escape! (2026).

== Early life ==
Dhakal was born in 2000 in Muscat, Oman. He was raised by his Filipino mother who is an Overseas Filipino Worker. After spending his teenage years, he moved to the Philippines in 2017.

== Career ==
After spent his first months since moving to the Philippines, Dhakal has found a new endeavor in music. He began developing his own bedroom tunes through his IPad and uploaded on SoundCloud. Much to attention, he was invited by fellow indie musician Eyedress to record the song "Lonely Af". A year after, he released his debut EP Night In. In 2020, he was signed to Warner Music Philippines and made his debut studio album lovesound, consists of 7 tracks including his lead single "Body and Soul". He later joined 88rising's Philippine collective label group Paradise Rising.

In December 2022, he released his own rendition version of the Hotdog song "Manila", serving as his love letter to the city he now lives in. The latter was part of his sophomore album BEING, released in 2023 and produced by fellow collaborator LUSTBASS.

In August 2026, Dhakal became an independent artist after his years with Warner Music. He released his third album, Escape!, featuring a fusion of R&B/soul and bossa nova tunes including his lead single "Play" and the collaborating song "Paradise" with Sitti.

== Musical influences ==
Dhakal had been listening to OPM and R&B songs since around age 4, particularly from artists like Mariah Carey, Beyoncé, Erykah Badu, and Amy Winehouse.

== Personal life ==
Dhakal came out as a queer at the age of 13.

== Discography ==
=== Studio albums ===
List of studio albums with selected details
Title	Album Details
lovesound	Released: February 14, 2020 (PH); Label: Warner Music Philippines; Format: Digital download, Streaming media
BEING	Released: September 13, 2023 (PH); Label: Warner Music Philippines; Format: Digital download, Streaming media
Escape!	Released: August 14, 2026 (PH); Label: Self-released; Format: Digital download, Streaming media

=== Extended plays ===
List of extended plays with selected details
Title	EP Details
Night In	Released: June 15, 2018 (PH); Label: Self-released; Format: Digital download, Streaming media

== Accolades ==
Award	Year	Category	Recipient(s)	Result	Ref.
Awit Awards	2021	Best R&B Recording	"Goodnight"	Nominated	
Awit Awards	2021	Best World Music Recording	"XX:XX" (with CRWN)	Nominated	
Awit Awards	2021	Peoples' Voice Favorite Male Artist	Jason Dhakal	Nominated	
Wish 107.5 Music Awards	2022	Wish Song Collaboration of the Year	"Happy W U" (with Arthur Nery)	Nominated	
Wish 107.5 Music Awards	2025	Wishclusive R&B Performance of the Year	"Para Sa Akin"	Nominated	
Wish 107.5 Music Awards	2026	Wishclusive R&B Song of the Year	"MAGIC"	Nominated	
