= Palagi (song) =

2023 single by TJ Monterde

Single by TJ Monterde

from the album Sariling Mundo
- Language: Tagalog
- English title: Always
- Released: July 6, 2023
- Genre: Pop
- Length: 3:38
- Label: N/A
- Songwriter: TJ Monterde
- Producers: TJ Monterde; Chino David

TJ Monterde singles chronology
"Plano" (2023)	"Palagi" (2023)	"Palagi (Wedding Version)" (2023)

Music video
- "Palagi" on YouTube

Palagi (lit. 'Always' in Tagalog) is a song by Filipino singer-songwriter TJ Monterde. It was released as a digital pre-single for his third album Sariling Mundo on July 6, 2023. Written by TJ Monterde and produced by Monterde and Chino David, it is a pop track in which Monterde wrote for his wife KZ Tandingan, expressing it as a reassurance song. The duet version featuring KZ Tandingan was released on August 28, 2024.

It received overwhelming positive reviews, with most of them praising the lyrics and emotional impact. "Palagi" was nominated at the 9th Wish Music Awards, and won. The duet version, was also nominated and won at 6th VP Choice Awards. Commercially, "Palagi" peaked at number one on the Billboard Top Philippine Songs and number two on the Philippines Hot 100 charts. The duet version also topped the Billboard Top Philippine Songs and Philippines Hot 100 Year-End charts.

== Background and release ==
After the release of his single "Plano", TJ Monterde released his next single, "Palagi" including his previous single and his wedding version on July 6, 2023.

In April 2024, Monterde has announced his new third album titled Sariling Mundo. The album features eight tracks, including the song "Palagi" and four unreleased songs. It was released on April 25, 2024.

== Composition ==
"Palagi" is three minutes and thirty-eight seconds long. Written by TJ Monterde and produced by Monterde and Chino David of Hale, the pop track is a sweet serenade with lyrics that promise commitment, as Monterde sings that they will always return to each other's arms despite any challenges or obstacles.

In March 2024, Monterde revealed that he wrote the track without any pressure to produce a hit song, stating that he simply wrote because he wrote. He did not have a barometer to determine if the song could surpass his other songs, and he let go of the pressure to write. Monterde also revealed that "Palagi" is a song he wrote for his wife KZ Tandingan, expressing it as a reassurance song. The song was first performed at a surprise garden dinner he prepared for her.

== Duet version ==
"Palagi (TJxKZ Version)"

Song by TJ Monterde and KZ Tandingan
- Language: Tagalog
- Released: August 28, 2024
- Recorded: 2024
- Genre: Pop
- Length: 4:01
- Label: N/A
- Songwriter: Titus John Monterde
- Producer: Titus John Monterde

Music video
- "Palagi (TJxKZ Version)" on YouTube

On August 27, 2024, Monterde announced the re-release of his successful track "Palagi" featuring his wife, KZ Tandingan, following the release of "Palagi – Wedding Version" and his solo concert at the New Frontier Theater on August 21.

A duet version titled "Palagi (TJxKZ Version)" was released on the following day, coinciding with the couple's fourth wedding anniversary.

According to Tandingan, she identifies the duet version as a "challenge" due to her and her husband's different styles of music. Tandingan initially hesitated about recording a duet with Monterde due to expectations of a new song. After consulting him, she realized she could only release a duet version due to his constant presence. Despite being fragile, Tandingan took the challenge and discussed her ideas with Monterde.

== Credits and personnel ==
Credits are adapted from Apple Music.

- TJ Monterde – vocals, songwriter, producer (Note: credited under his full name Titus John Monterde)
- John Apura – guitar
- Chino David – producer
- Albert Tamayo – mixing engineer

== Awards and nominations ==
Award	Year	Category	Result	Ref.
Myx Music Awards 2024	2024	Mellow Video of the Year	Nominated	
9th Wish 107.5 Music Awards	2024	Wish Pop Song of the Year	Won	
VP Choice Awards	2025	OPM Song of the Year	Won	(Note: A duet version of "Palagi")
PMPC Star Awards for Music	2026	Song of the Year	Nominated	

== Charts ==
=== Weekly charts ===
Weekly chart performance for "Palagi"
Chart (2024)	Peak position
Philippines (IFPI)	3
Philippines (Top Philippine Songs)	1
Philippines (Philippines Hot 100)	2

=== Year-end charts ===
Year-end chart performance for "Palagi"
Chart (2024)	Position
Philippines (Philippines Hot 100)	1
Philippines (Top Philippine Songs)	1
