= Earl Agustin =

Filipino singer-songwriter (born 2001)

- Born: May 18, 2001 (age 25); Ozamiz City, Misamis Occidental
- Origin: Philippines
- Genres: R&B; soul
- Occupations: Singer; songwriter
- Instrument: Singing
- Years active: 2021–present
- Label: Vicor Music

Earl Agustin (born May 18, 2001) is a Filipino singer-songwriter. He was discovered in 2021 following his appearance in a Coke Studio special, which led to his signing with Vicor Music. In February 2023, he released his debut single under the record label, "Dalangin", which was followed with the release of "Tibok" that same year.

In 2024, Agustin released "Dito Sa'kin" and "Aya". Both singles were followed up by "Pag-Ibig ng Ikaw at Ako" in 2025, when "Tibok" also gained significant attention after being featured in the Philippine television series, Ang Mutya ng Section E, leading to the track going viral on social media. This surge in popularity contributed to its success on record charts, peaking atop the Philippines Hot 100, Top Philippine Songs, and Official Philippines Chart and reaching the Billboard Global Excl. US.

== Early life and education ==
Agustin was born on May 18, 2001 and raised in Ozamiz City, Misamis Occidental. He found his passion for music at the age of 14, playing slow rock songs by Eric Clapton and Scorpions. He was also a member in acapella groups in Ozamiz City National High School and La Salle University – Ozamiz during his senior high school and college years, respectively. He is a Born-again Christian.

== Career ==
Agustin's career in music began with the release of his independently-produced song "Tapos Na" in 2021. During an appearance on a Coke Studio special in 2021, his performance caught the attention of a Vicor Music A&R executive, and although he had already released a single independently, this exposure led to his signing with Vicor Music. Following his discovery, Agustin made his official label debut in February 2023 with the single "Dalangin", which introduced his signature blend of R&B and vintage soul sounds to a broader audience, with initial listeners comparing his vocal style to that of fellow singer Arthur Nery. Later that same year, he continued to build his profile with the release of "Tibok", further establishing his place in the Filipino music scene.

In 2025 Agustin experienced significant breakthroughs. Although "Tibok" was released in 2023, its feature in the Philippine television series Ang Mutya ng Section E contributed to its viral success on social media and led to notable chart debuts. In late March the track entered on two Billboard Philippines's record charts, Philippines Hot 100 at number nine and the Top Philippine Songs at number five, while also debuting at number five on the International Federation of the Phonographic Industry's Official Philippines Chart. The following week, "Tibok" reached atop on all three charts as well as opening at number 144 on Billboard's Global Excl. US. In the same month, Agustin released the single "Pag-Ibig ng Ikaw at Ako", which presents a love story and features '80s synth elements, blending influences from past decades with modern production techniques. "Pag-Ibig ng Ikaw at Ako" served as a follow-up to his previous singles "Aya" (2024) and "Dito Sa'kin" (2024).

== Influences and musical style ==
Earl has cited VST & Company and Apo Hiking Society, as well as the musical duo Silk Sonic as key influences on his music. He has expressed a particular affinity for the Manila sound and the musical styles of the 1970s and 1980s. Drawing from these influences, Earl wrote "Tibok" in 2023, inspired by personal experiences. He has stated that the song was written as an emotional response to being ghosted, channeling his feelings into music.

== Accolades ==
Name of the award ceremony, year presented, award category, nominee(s) of the award, and the result of the nomination
Award ceremony	Year	Category	Nominee(s)/work(s)	Result	Ref.
Filipino Music Awards	2025	Album of the Year	Himig at Pag-ibig	Nominated	
Filipino Music Awards	2025	Artist of the Year	Earl Agustin	Nominated	

== Discography ==
=== Studio albums ===
List of studio albums, with release date, label, and format shown
Title	Details	Ref.
Himig at Pag-Ibig	Released: June 13, 2025; Label: Vicor Music; Format: digital download, streaming	

=== Singles ===
List of singles, showing year released, selected chart positions and album name
Title	Year	Peak chart positions					Album	Ref.
Title	Year	PHL	PHL Top.	PHL IFPI	UAE	WW Excl. US	Album	Ref.
"Tapos Na"	2021	—	—	—	—	—	Non-album single	
"Dalangin"	2023	7	5	9	—	—	Himig at Pag-ibig	
"Tibok"	2023	1	1	1	13	111	Himig at Pag-ibig	
"Dito Sa'kin"	2024	24	15	—	—	—	Himig at Pag-ibig	
"Aya"	2024	33	22	—	—	—	Himig at Pag-ibig	
"Pag-Ibig ng Ikaw at Ako"	2025	45	—	—	—	—	Himig at Pag-ibig	
"Di Na"	2026	—	—	—	—	—	Non-album singles	
"Baka Tayo"	2026	—	—	—	—	—	Non-album singles	
"—" denotes a single that did not chart.

=== Soundtrack appearances ===
List of media in which Earl Agustin's songs have been used
Year	Film/series/program	Song(s)	Ref.
2025	Ang Mutya ng Section E	"Tibok"	
2025	Avenues of the Diamond	"Dalangin"	
2025	Avenues of the Diamond	"A Little Bit"	
2025	Seducing Drake Palma	"Pag-Ibig ng Ikaw at Ako"	
2025	Seducing Drake Palma	"Dito Sa'kin"	
2025	Minamahal	"Minamahal" (featuring Dana Paulene)	
