= Philippines Hot 100 =

Record chart in the Philippines

Philippines Hot 100 logo

The Philippines Hot 100 is a record chart in the Philippines, published weekly by Billboard Philippines. First issued on June 12, 2017, it ranks the top songs by local and foreign artists and reflects the music consumption in the country. Luminate compiles data for its chart rankings based on localized music streaming data, digital downloads, and video plays. Each chart's issue is released every Wednesday on the magazine's website.

To date, Taylor Swift and Bruno Mars has had the most entries for number-one singles on the chart. The first number-one single on the chart was Ed Sheeran's "Shape of You", on the issue dated June 12, 2017. The magazine published the last issue of the Philippine Hot 100 on January 15, 2018, with Sheeran's "Perfect" as the issue's number-one single. Subsequently, the magazine ceased to operate for undisclosed reasons.

The chart was temporarily replaced from February 2022 to June 2024 by the Philippines Songs chart, which was published by the American Billboard under the Hits of the World collection. When Billboard Philippines was relaunched on October 15, 2023, under a different owner, the Philippines Songs chart was discontinued on July 2, 2024, in preparation for the relaunch of the Philippines Hot 100 chart on the following day. The first number-one song of the relaunched chart was "Dilaw" by Maki, on July 6, 2024. The current number-one song on the chart is "Na Para Bang" by Mariah Deborah.

== Methodology ==
From 2017 to 2018, the Philippine Hot 100 used compiled data from Nielsen Music based on localized music streaming data, digital downloads, and video plays from the music platforms Apple Music, Spotify, iTunes, and YouTube. Billboard Philippines published each chart issue on the magazine's website every Monday.

Since 2024, the chart uses "streaming and sales from leading musical services in the Philippine territory" as compiled by Luminate. Chart ranking uses a weighted formula using "official-only streams on both subscription and ad-supported tiers of available audio and video music services, as well as download sales –– which are reflected from purchases made directly from full-service digital music retailers." The Philippines Hot 100 chart, along with the Top Philippine Songs chart is published every Wednesday.

== List of number-one singles ==
Key

* – The current number one
♪ – Number-one single of the year

Note: The best-performing single on the Philippines Hot 100 of 2024 was TJ Monterde's "Palagi", which peaked at number two, and thus is excluded here.

#	Reached number one	Artist(s)	Single	Weeks	Ref.
2017
1	June 12, 2017	Ed Sheeran	"Shape of You"	4	
2	July 10, 2017	Luis Fonsi and Daddy Yankee feat. Justin Bieber	"Despacito"	12	
3	September 18, 2017	Taylor Swift	"Look What You Made Me Do"	1	
4	October 9, 2017	Khalid	"Young Dumb & Broke"	7	
5	October 30, 2017	Ed Sheeran	"Perfect"	5	
6	December 18, 2017	Moira Dela Torre	"Titibo-Tibo"	2	
2018
7	January 1, 2018	Camila Cabello feat. Young Thug	"Havana"	1	
Philippines Hot 100 was discontinued in 2018. There were no music charts in the Philippines until 2022 when Billboard launched Philippines Songs. Philippines Hot 100 was relaunched on July 6, 2024.
2024
1	July 6, 2024	Maki	"Dilaw"	4	
2	August 3, 2024	Dionela feat. Jay R	"Sining"	7	
3	September 21, 2024	Lady Gaga and Bruno Mars	"Die with a Smile"	7	
4	November 2, 2024	Rosé and Bruno Mars	"APT."	6	
5	December 21, 2024	Kendrick Lamar and SZA	"Luther"	6	
6	December 28, 2024	Dionela	"Marilag"	8	
2025
7	March 29, 2025	Earl Agustin	"Tibok"	3	
8	April 19, 2025	Cup of Joe	"Multo"♪	33	
9	October 18, 2025	Taylor Swift	"The Fate of Ophelia"	1	
10	November 1, 2025	Taylor Swift	"Opalite"	3	
2026
11	January 3, 2026	fitterkarma	"Pag-Ibig ay Kanibalismo II"	13	
12	March 28, 2026	Bruno Mars	"Risk It All"	1	
13	April 11, 2026	BTS	"SWIM"	1	
14	April 18, 2026	Skusta Clee feat. Flow G	"Since Day One"	7	
15	April 25, 2026	Ben&Ben	"Lifetime"	1	
16	June 13, 2026	fitterkarma	"Kalapastangan"	8	
17	June 20, 2026	Ariana Grande	"Hate That I Made You Love Me"	3	
18	August 29, 2026	Adéla	"Ain't in LA"	6	
19	October 10, 2026	Mariah Deborah	"Na Para Bang"	7*	

== Top Philippine Songs ==
Top Philippine Songs is the country's all-Filipino music chart which focuses exclusively on Filipino songs. Just like the former chart Philippines Songs from Hits of the World, it ranks the top 25 local tracks in the country based on streaming and sales activity from leading music services in the territory.

Key

* – The current number one
♪ – Number-one single of the year

#	Reached number one	Artist(s)	Single	Weeks	Ref.
2024
1	July 6, 2024	Maki	"Dilaw"	4	
2	August 3, 2024	Dionela feat. Jay R	"Sining"	12	
3	October 26, 2024	TJ Monterde solo or feat. KZ Tandingan (Note: For the first three weeks that "Palagi" by TJ Monterde was at number one, the solo version was the song's billing on the Philippines Hot 100 and Top Philippine Songs. The duet version with KZ Tandingan hit number one on the remaining four weeks.)	"Palagi"♪	7	
4	December 14, 2024	Dionela	"Marilag"	15	
2025
5	March 29, 2025	Earl Agustin	"Tibok"	3	
6	April 19, 2025	Cup of Joe	"Multo"♪	38	
2026
7	January 3, 2026	fitterkarma	"Pag-Ibig ay Kanibalismo II"	15	
8	April 18, 2026	Skusta Clee feat. Flow G	"Since Day One"	7	
9	April 25, 2026	Ben&Ben	"Lifetime"	1	
10	June 13, 2026	fitterkarma	"Kalapastangan"	15	
11	October 3, 2026	Mariah Deborah	"Na Para Bang"	8*	

== Monthly charts ==
=== P-Pop Songs ===
May 2025

Top 10 P-Pop Songs
#	Song	Artist
1	"Dam"	SB19
2	"Blink Twice"	Bini
3	"Dungka!"	SB19
4	"Time"	SB19
5	"Pantropiko"	Bini
6	"Salamin, Salamin"	Bini
7	"Quit"	SB19
8	"8TonBall"	SB19
9	"Shooting for the Stars"	SB19
10	"Karera"	Bini

August 2025

Top 10 P-Pop Songs
#	Song	Artist
1	"Dam"	SB19
2	"Umaaligid"	Sarah Geronimo and SB19
3	"Dungka!"	SB19
4	"Time"	SB19
5	"Quit"	SB19
6	"8tonBall"	SB19
7	"Pantropiko"	Bini
8	"Salamin, Salamin"	Bini
9	"Shooting for the Stars"	SB19
10	"Shagidi"	Bini

=== Rock Songs ===
May 2025

Top 10 Rock Songs
#	Song	Artist
1	"Umaasa"	Calein
2	"Tadhana"	Up Dharma Down
3	"Kung Wala Ka"	Hale
4	"Iris"	Goo Goo Dolls
5	"Sino"	Unique
6	"Unti-Unti"	Up Dharma Down
7	"Burnout"	Sugarfree
8	"The Day You Said Goodnight"	Hale
9	"Hanggang Kailan"	Orange and Lemons
10	"You'll Be Safe Here"	Rico Blanco

September 2025

Top 10 Rock Songs
#	Song	Artist
1	"Tensionado"	Soapdish
2	"Your Universe"	Rico Blanco
3	"Iris"	Goo Goo Dolls
4	"Tadhana"	Up Dharma Down
5	"Sino"	Unique
6	"Burnout"	Sugarfree
7	"Umaasa"	Calein
8	"About You"	The 1975
9	"Aura"	IV of Spades
10	"Unti-Unti"	Up Dharma Down

November 2025

Top 10 Rock Songs
#	Song	Artist
1	"Pag-Ibig ay Kanibalismo II"	fitterkarma
2	"Tensionado"	Soapdish
3	"Iris"	Goo Goo Dolls
4	"Your Universe"	Rico Blanco
5	"Tadhana"	Up Dharma Down
6	"Unti-Unti"	Up Dharma Down
7	"Aura"	IV of Spades
8	"Umaasa"	Calein
9	"You'll Be Safe Here"	Rico Blanco
10	"Kalapastangan"	fitterkarma

=== Hip-Hop Songs ===
June 2025

Top 10 Hip-Hop Songs
#	Song	Artist
1	"My Day"	Hellmerry
2	"Kalimutan Ka"	Skusta Clee
3	"B4 I Let You Go"	Ryoujin and CK YG
4	"Luther"	Kendrick Lamar and SZA
5	"Nicotine"	SAJKA
6	"Gusto Ko Sakin Ka Lang"	Robledo Timido
7	"Pwede Bang?"	Hev Abi
8	"Ipagdadamot Kita"	OLG Zak, Realest Cram, and Nateman
9	"All the Stars"	Kendrick Lamar and SZA
10	"City Girls"	Shanti Dope

August 2025

Top 10 Hip-Hop Songs
#	Song	Artist
1	"Folded"	Kehlani
2	"My Day"	Hellmerry
3	"Luther"	Kendrick Lamar and SZA
4	"B4 I Let You Go"	Ryoujin and CK YG
5	"Imma Flirt"	Nateman and Lucky
6	"Gusto Ko Sakin Ka Lang"	Robledo Timido
7	"City Girl"	Shanti Dope
8	"All the Stars"	Kendrick Lamar and SZA
9	"Sa Susunod Na Lang"	PDL, Skusta Clee, and Yuridope
10	"Ipagdadamot Kita"	OLG Zak, Realest Cram, and Nateman

October 2025

Top 10 Hip-Hop Songs
#	Song	Artist
1	"My Day"	Hellmerry
2	"Wag Ipagsabi"	Dreycruz, Bert Symoun
3	"Luther"	Kendrick Lamar and SZA
4	"Upuan"	Gloc-9
5	"Sugar on My Tongue"	Tyler, the Creator
6	"Predador De Perereca"	Blow Records and MC Jhey
7	"City Girl"	Shanti Dope
8	"Imma Flirt"	Nateman
9	"Sa Susunod Na Lang"	PDL, Skusta Clee, and Yuridope
10	"Gangsta Baby"	Hellmerry and Baby G

=== Ballad Songs ===
June 2025

Top 10 Ballad Songs
#	Song	Artist
1	"You'll Be in My Heart"	NIKI
2	"Sa Bawat Sandali"	Amiel Sol
3	"Palagi"	TJ Monterde feat. KZ Tandingan
4	"Die with a Smile"	Lady Gaga and Bruno Mars
5	"I'll Be"	Edwin McCain
6	"Ikaw Lang"	NOBITA
7	"The Only Exception"	Paramore
8	"Bulong"	December Avenue
9	"If Ever You're in My Arms Again"	Peabo Bryson
10	"Passenger Seat"	Stephen Speaks

November 2025

Top 10 Ballad Songs
#	Song	Artist
1	"Saksi Ang Langit"	December Avenue
2	"Bulong"	December Avenue
3	"Marilag"	Dionela
4	"Palagi"	TJ Monterde feat. KZ Tandingan
5	"Di Nakakasawa"	Arthur Nery and Kiyo
6	"Sa Bawat Sandali"	Amiel Sol
7	"Take All The Love"	Arthur Nery
8	"Sa Ngalan Ng Pag-Ibig"	December Avenue
9	"I'll Be"	Edwin McCain
10	"You'll Be in My Heart"	NIKI

=== R&B Songs ===
July 2025

Top 10 R&B Songs
#	Song	Artist
1	"Naiilang"	Le John
2	"Folded"	Kehlani
3	"Marilag"	Dionela
4	"Supernatural"	Ariana Grande
5	"Sining"	Dionela feat. Jay R
6	"Snooze"	SZA
7	"Always"	Daniel Caesar
8	"Mutt"	Leon Thomas
9	"Take All the Love"	Arthur Nery
10	"Best Part"	Daniel Caesar

October 2025

Top 10 R&B Songs
#	Song	Artist
1	Folded"	Kehlani
2	"Naiilang"	Le John
3	"Marilag"	Dionela
4	"Isa Lang"	Arthur Nery
5	"Sining"	Dionela feat. Jay R
6	"Snooze"	SZA
7	"Always"	Daniel Caesar
8	"Take All the Love"	Arthur Nery
9	"It Will Rain"	Bruno Mars
10	"Oksihina"	Dionela

=== K-Pop Songs ===
July 2025

Top 10 K-Pop Songs
#	Song	Artist
1	"Golden"	Huntrix (Note: credited as Huntrix, Ejae, Audrey Nuna, Rei Ami, KPop Demon Hunters Cast)
2	"Soda Pop"	Saja Boys (Note: credited as Saja Boys, Andrew Choi, Neckwav, Danny Chung, Kevin Woo, SamUIL Lee, KPop Demon Hunters Cast)
3	"Free"	EJAE, Andrew Choi (Note: credited as EJAE (as the voice of Rumi), Andrew Choi (as the voice of Jinu), Rumi, Jinu, KPop Demon Hunters Cast)
4	"How It's Done"	Huntrix
5	"Your Idol"	Saja Boys
6	"What It Sounds Like"	Huntrix
7	"Takedown"	Huntrix
8	"Killin' It Girl"	J-Hope feat. GloRilla
9	"Strategy"	Twice
10	"Takedown"	Twice

=== Pop Songs ===
September 2025

Top 10 Pop Songs
#	Song	Artist
1	"Daisies"	Justin Bieber
2	"Gabriela"	KATSEYE
3	"Manchild"	Sabrina Carpenter
4	"You'll Be in My Heart"	NIKI
5	"Love Me Not"	Ravyn Lenae
6	"Birds of a Feather"	Billie Eilish
7	"Supernatural"	Ariana Grande and Troye Sivan
8	"Party 4 U"	Charli XCX
9	"Tears"	Sabrina Carpenter
10	"The Subway"	Chappell Roan

== Defunct charts ==
=== Philippine Top 20 ===
The top 20 tracks by Filipino artists on the Philippines Hot 100 were also listed on a separate chart called the Philippine Top 20. The table below lists all the songs that reached number one on this chart.

"Titibo-tibo" by Moira Dela Torre is the only local song to reach number one on the Philippines Hot 100 chart, making it the only song to top both the Philippines Hot 100 and Philippine Top 20. It stayed at the top for two weeks from December 18 to 25, 2017.

Issue date	Song	Artist(s)	Weeks	Ref.
June 12, 2017	"Dahil Sa'yo"	Iñigo Pascual	9	
August 14, 2017	"Two Less Lonely People in the World"	KZ Tandingan	7	
October 2, 2017	"Dahil Sa'yo"	Iñigo Pascual	1	
October 9, 2017	"Two Less Lonely People in the World"	KZ Tandingan	1	
October 16, 2017	"Dahil Sa'yo"	Iñigo Pascual	2	
October 30, 2017	"Malaya"	Moira Dela Torre	3	
November 20, 2017	"Titibo-Tibo"	Moira Dela Torre	9	

=== Catalog Chart ===
Issue date	Song	Artist(s)	Weeks	Ref.
June 12, 2017	"Tadhana"	Up Dharma Down	4	
July 10, 2017	"Nakakamiss"	Smugglaz, Curse One, Dello, and Flict-G	1	
July 17, 2017	"Tadhana"	Up Dharma Down	8	
September 11, 2017	"Sa'yo"	Silent Sanctuary	1	
September 18, 2017	"Ikaw"	Yeng Constantino	1	
September 25, 2017	"Torete"	Moonstar88	17	

=== K-Pop Top 5 ===
Issue date	Song	Artist(s)	Weeks	Ref.
September 15, 2017	"Fire"	BTS	2	
September 29, 2017	"Power"	Exo	1	
October 6, 2017	"DNA"	BTS	7	
November 24, 2017	"Likey"	Twice	3	
December 15, 2017	"MIC Drop"	BTS	2	
December 29, 2017	"DNA"	BTS	1	
January 5, 2018	"Heart Shaker"	Twice	2	

== Statistics ==
=== Artists by total number-one singles ===
Artist	Number-one singles	Singles
Taylor Swift	3	"Look What You Made Me Do" "The Fate of Ophelia" "Opalite"
Bruno Mars	3	"Die with a Smile" "APT." "Risk It All"
Ed Sheeran	2	"Shape of You" "Perfect"
Dionela	2	"Sining" "Marilag"
fitterkarma	2	"Pag-Ibig ay Kanibalismo II" "Kalapastangan"

=== Artists by total cumulative weeks at number one ===
Artist	Weeks at number one	Singles
Cup of Joe	33	"Multo" (33 weeks)
fitterkarma	21	"Pag-Ibig ay Kanibalismo II" (13 weeks) "Kalapastangan" (8 weeks)
Dionela	15	"Sining" (7 weeks) "Marilag" (8 weeks)
Bruno Mars	14	"Die with a Smile" (7 weeks) "APT." (6 weeks) "Risk It All" (1 week)
Luis Fonsi	12	"Despacito" (12 weeks)
Daddy Yankee	12	"Despacito" (12 weeks)
Justin Bieber	12	"Despacito" (12 weeks)
Ed Sheeran	9	"Shape of You" (4 weeks) "Perfect" (5 weeks)
Khalid	7	"Young Dumb & Broke" (7 weeks)
Jay R	7	"Sining" (7 weeks)
Lady Gaga	7	"Die with a Smile" (7 weeks)
Skusta Clee	7	"Since Day One" (7 weeks)
Flow G	7	"Since Day One" (7 weeks)
Mariah Deborah	7	"Na Para Bang" (7 weeks)

=== Songs by total number of weeks at number one ===
Song	Artist(s)	Weeks	Ref.
"Multo"	Cup of Joe	33	
"Pag-Ibig ay Kanibalismo II"	fitterkarma	13	
"Despacito"	Luis Fonsi and Daddy Yankee feat. Justin Bieber	12	
"Marilag"	Dionela	8	
"Kalapastangan"	fitterkarma	8	
"Young Dumb & Broke"	Khalid	7	
"Sining"	Dionela feat. Jay R	7	
"Die with a Smile"	Lady Gaga and Bruno Mars	7	
"Since Day One"	Skusta Clee feat. Flow G	7	
"Na Para Bang"	Mariah Deborah	7	

=== Most total weeks on Philippines Hot 100 ===
Number of weeks	Artist(s)	Song	Year entered	Year departed
125	Arthur Nery	"Isa Lang"	2024	Present
125	The Script	"The Man Who Can't Be Moved"	2024	Present
125	Up Dharma Down	"Tadhana"	2024	Present
125	Up Dharma Down	"Unti-Unti"	2024	Present
119	TJ Monterde (Note: 50 weeks solo, 69 weeks featuring KZ Tandingan)	"Palagi"	2024	2026
119	Billie Eilish	"Birds of a Feather"	2024	2026
119	Goo Goo Dolls	"Iris"	2024	Present
112	Daniel Caesar	"Always"	2024	Present
111	Arthur Nery	"Take All the Love"	2024	Present
110	SZA	"Snooze"	2024	2026

== See also ==
- Philippines Songs
- Official Philippines Chart
