= Loonie (musician) =

Filipino rapper (born 1985)

- Born: Marlon Peroramas; December 18, 1985 (age 40)
- Genres: Hip hop; Pinoy hip-hop
- Occupations: Rapper; songwriter; record producer; emcee artist
- Years active: 2002–present
- Labels: MCA (UMG); Sony Philippines; Artifice
- Member of: Stick Figgas

Marlon Peroramas (born December 18, 1985), known professionally as Loonie, (Note: The stage name stands for "Lyrically One Of the Nation's Illest Emcees".) is a Filipino rapper, songwriter, and producer. He is known for his hit song "Tao Lang", featuring Quest. He is the front member of the hip hop group Stick Figgas and rose to prominence through his performances in the FlipTop Battle League. He is considered one of the influential figures in Pinoy hip-hop.

== Early life and education ==
Marlon Peroramas grew up as the eldest of four siblings. His father, an editor of corporate reports, encouraged him to develop strong English communication skills through reading and word games. As a youth in the 1990s, he listened to Bone Thugs-n-Harmony, Coolio, Naughty by Nature and N.W.A. He also cited Alanis Morissette's Jagged Little Pill as an influence that inspired him to write his own songs. Although he initially intended to pursue Mass Communication, he instead majored in Information Technology.

== Career ==
Loonie began competing in rap battles before high school and later gained national exposure as a member of Stick Figgas, which finished second in the talent search "Rappublic of the Philippines" on Eat Bulaga! in 2002.

In 2010, Loonie was signed by Sony Music Philippines. The label released the single "From Saudi With Love" before ceasing operations. He independently released his debut album The Ones Who Never Made It, distributing copies for free.

His later works included his album Ultrasound in 2013 and singles such as "Tao Lang", "Pilosopo", and "Balewala". He revealed that "Tao Lang" was written as a rebellious response to pressure from a former label to produce a love song.

After a three-year hiatus, he released the 12-track album Meron Na in December 2023. The album featured the track "Tugmang Preso", which recounted his arrest and detention.

In 2024, he collaborated with Arthur Nery on "Palaisipan". He also released "May Nanalo Na" with Frizzle Anne. Loonie partnered with SB19 member Pablo in a live reaction video on his YouTube series "Break It Down".

On March 20, 2025, Loonie collaborated with R&B artist Dionela for his single titled "Ikigai". On June 22, he released "Gugmang Preso", his first track written entirely in Cebuano.

== Philanthropy ==
During the COVID-19 pandemic period, Loonie launched free online rap classes under "Looniebersidad: Rap Academy".

== Musical style ==
Loonie is known for his "thought-provoking" and strong lyrics and is considered an important figure in Pinoy hip-hop. He became prominent through his performances in the FlipTop Battle League, where his battle raps were direct and forceful. He also writes songs about social issues and his own experiences.

== Controversy ==
In September 2019, the Makati City Office of the Prosecutor indicted Peroramas, his sister Idyll Liza Peroramas and two others for alleged violations of Section 5 of the Comprehensive Dangerous Drugs Act of 2002 in connection with a buy-bust operation. He was held at the Makati City Jail from September 2019 until January 2020. In 2020, he was released after posting bail set at ₱2 million.

On June 22, 2021, Judge Gina Bibat-Palamos of the Makati Regional Trial Court Branch 64 granted a demurrer to evidence and dismissed the case against Peroramas and his co-accused. The court ruled that the prosecution failed to establish its case, noting the absence of required independent witnesses during the buy-bust operation.

== Discography ==
=== Studio albums ===
- The Ones Who Never Made It (2010)
- Ultrasound (2013)
- Meron Na (2023)

=== Selected singles ===
- "From Saudi With Love" featuring Ka Antonio (2010)
- "Tao Lang" featuring Quest (2012)
- "Pilosopo" (2013)
- "May Nanalo Na" featuring Frizzle Anne (2024)
- "Balewala" (2013)
- "Gugmang Preso" (2025)

=== Collaborations ===
- "Ikigai" with Dionela (2024)
- "Palaisipan" with Arthur Nery (2024)
