= Kalapastangan =

Single by Fitterkarma

from the album kung tayo’y nasa isang horror na pelikula, tiyak ako ang una mong papatayin
- Language: Tagalog
- English title: Blasphemy
- Released: November 24, 2023
- Genre: Indie rock, alternative rock
- Songwriter: Joao De Leon
- Producer: Joao De Leon

Fitterkarma singles chronology
"Kalapastangan" (2023)	"Pag-Ibig ay Kanibalismo II" (2025)

"Kalapastangan" (lit. 'Blasphemy') is a song by Filipino alternative rock band Fitterkarma. It was released as a digital single on November 24, 2023, and was the band's only release that year. The song later achieved chart success in the Billboard Philippine Hot 100 following renewed interest toward the band's earlier material after the popularity of their single "Pag-Ibig ay Kanibalismo II" (2025).

== Release ==
"Kalapastangan" was released on November 24, 2023, nearly two years before it entered local music charts. It remained Fitterkarma's sole release for 2023 and preceded "Pag-Ibig ay Kanibalismo II", which was issued on February 14, 2025. According to Billboard Philippines, Fitterkarma’s only single for 2023, "Kalapastangan", attracted attention after "Pag-Ibig ay Kanibalismo II" became popular online.

== Composition ==
"Kalapastangan" is four minutes and thirty-six seconds long, and was written and produced by Joao De Leon. The song draws on elements common to early-2000s emo and pop-punk, including a repeating drum pattern and scrambled vocal parts, which Esquire Philippines noted as reminiscent of bands such as My Chemical Romance.

== Commercial performance ==
On November 12, 2025, Billboard Philippines announced that "Kalapastangan" debuted at number 45 on the Philippines Hot 100 chart dated November 15, 2025. The entry marked Fitterkarma's second appearance on the chart. In the same month, the song had accumulated over one million streams, becoming one of the band's most-streamed tracks at the time.

In January 2026, the song climbed to number 2 on both the Philippines Hot 100 and the Top Philippine Songs charts, overtaking Cup of Joe's "Multo". During the same week, it ranked at number 3 on Top Philippine Songs and number 7 on the Philippines Hot 100.

== Charts ==
Chart performance for "Kalapastangan"
Chart	Peak position
Philippines (IFPI)	1
Philippines Hot 100 (Billboard Philippines)	1
Philippines Top Songs (Billboard Philippines)	1

== Personnel ==
Credits adapted from Apple Music.

- Joao De Leon – lead vocals, songwriting, producer
- Calvin Borja – guitar
- Sisley Paul Paras – guitar
- Sanders Bayas – drums
