= Official Philippines Chart =

Record chart in the Philippines

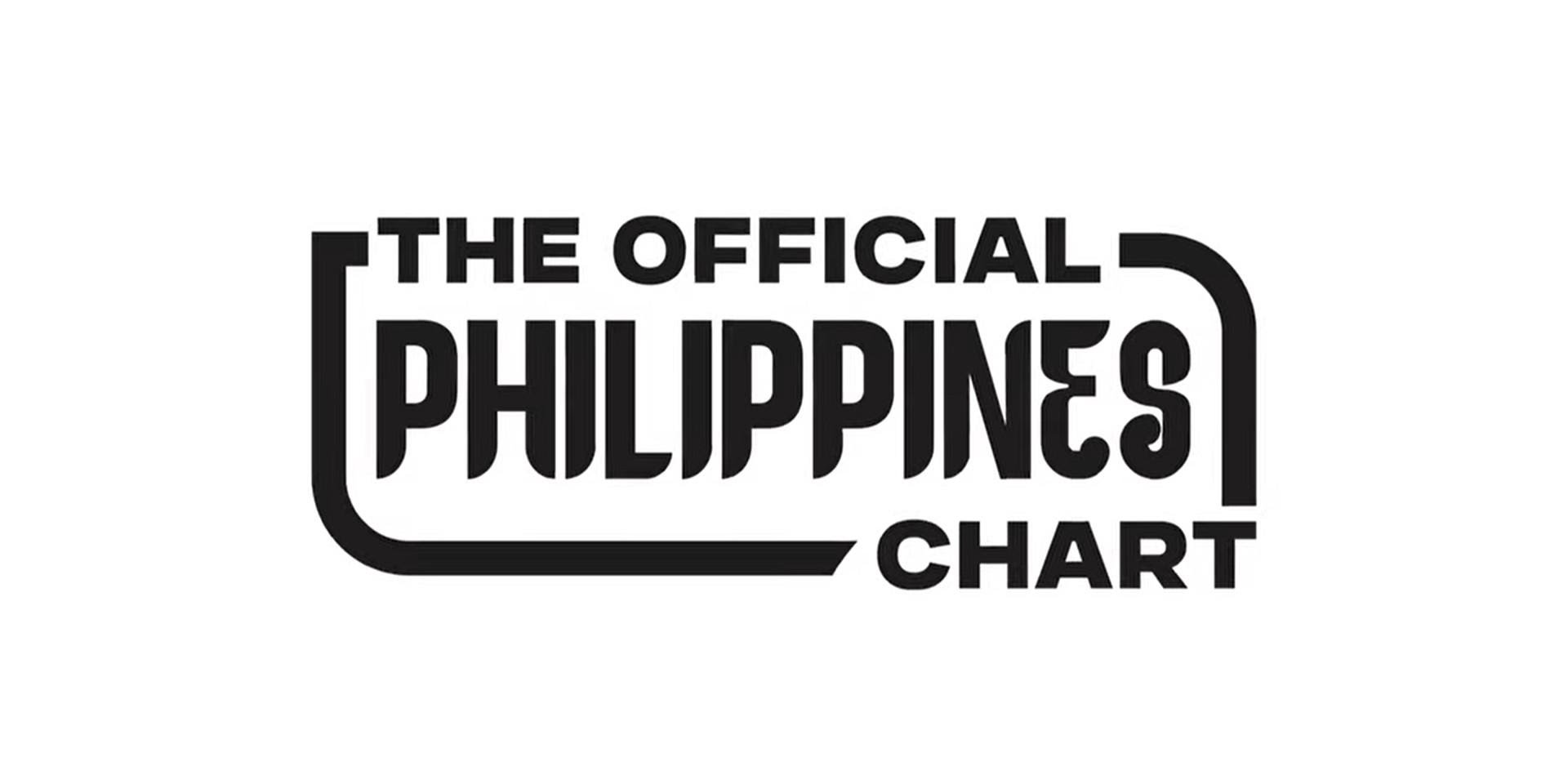
Official Philippines Chart logo

The Official Philippines Chart is a record chart launched in February 2025 by the International Federation of the Phonographic Industry (IFPI). Based on data from BMAT, the chart reflects the 20 most-streamed songs in the Philippines. It is part of the Official Southeast Asia Charts, a collection of record charts by the IFPI in six Southeast Asian (SEA) countries.

== History ==
As part of Official Southeast Asian Charts, the Official Philippines Chart was launched in February 19, 2025 in Bonifacio Global City in Taguig. On launching day, several well known local artists were included in the initial rankings such as Arthur Nery, Cup of Joe, Bini, Dionela, Maki, TJ Monterde, Flow G, Al James, Ben&Ben, and Hev Abi. All were listed among the top ten local songs and artists of 2024.

== Methodology ==
The chart tracks streams from Apple Music, Deezer, Spotify, and YouTube Music. Streams are weighted to take into account differences between streams from free or paid accounts. Data from BMAT are collected weekly from Friday to Thursday, with charts of the 20 most-streamed songs published the following Tuesday on the official website and social media platforms. Music downloads and purchases of physical music do not count towards the charts, and different versions or remixes of songs are grouped together for charting purposes. To be eligible to chart, more than 30 seconds of a song must be streamed. The data collection period runs from Friday to Thursday, with the rankings released on their website and official Southeast Asia social media pages the following Tuesday.

== List of number-one songs ==
Key

* – The current number one

Week No.	Issue date	Song	Artist(s)	Weeks
2025
3–6	January 23, 2025	"Marilag"	Dionela	4
7–11	February 18, 2025	"Luther"	Kendrick Lamar and SZA	5
12–14	March 25, 2025	"Tibok"	Earl Agustin	3
15–40	April 15, 2025	"Multo"	Cup of Joe	26
41	October 14, 2025	"The Fate of Ophelia"	Taylor Swift	1
42–51	October 21, 2025	"Multo"	Cup of Joe	10
52	December 30, 2025	"Pag-Ibig ay Kanibalismo II"	fitterkarma	1
2026
1–8	January 6, 2026	"Pag-Ibig ay Kanibalismo II"	fitterkarma	8
9	March 3, 2026	"Multo"	Cup of Joe	1
10–11	March 10, 2026	"Pag-Ibig ay Kanibalismo II"	fitterkarma	2
12	March 24, 2026	"Risk It All"	Bruno Mars	1
13–15	March 31, 2026	"Kalapastangan"	fitterkarma	3
16–19	April 21, 2026	"Lifetime"	Ben&Ben	4
20–31	May 19, 2026	"Kalapastangan"	fitterkarma	12
32	August 11, 2026	"Hate That I Made You Love Me"	Ariana Grande	1
33–34	August 18, 2026	"Kalapastangan"	fitterkarma	2
35–39	September 1, 2026	"Ain't in LA"	Adéla	5
40–46	October 6, 2026	"Na Para Bang"	Mariah Deborah	7*

== See also ==
- Philippines Hot 100
- Philippines Songs
