= Tibok =

Single by Earl Agustin
- Language: Tagalog
- English title: Heartbeat
- Released: June 16, 2023
- Genre: Funk-pop; R&B; soul
- Length: 5:26
- Label: Vicor Music
- Songwriter: Earl Agustin
- Producer: Jean-Paul Verona

Earl Agustin singles chronology
"Dalangin" (2023)	"Tibok" (2023)	"Dito Sa'kin" (2024)

Performance video
- "Tibok" on YouTube

"Tibok" (lit. 'Heartbeat' in Tagalog) is a song written and recorded by the Filipino singer-songwriter Earl Agustin, released by Vicor Music on June 16, 2023. Produced by Jean-Paul Verona, it is a midtempo upbeat track led by synthesizers with crescendoing R&B beats. Several critics commented on the song's sound and identified it as "funk-pop" and R&B. Lyrically, "Tibok" is about the first stages of falling in love, examining the theme of gradually developing a romantic attachment to someone and hoping that the feelings are mutual.

Following its inclusion on the Philippine television series Ang Mutya ng Section E (2025), "Tibok" received significant attention and went viral on social media platforms, including TikTok. The track became Agustin's breakthrough success and set the record for the highest single-day streams for an OPM song on Spotify. On record charts, "Tibok" peaked atop on the Philippines Hot 100, Top Philippine Songs, and Official Philippines Chart and reached number 144 on Global Excl. US. The song was later included in Agustin's debut studio album, Himig at Pag-Ibig (2025).

== Background and release ==
Earl Agustin signed a contract with Vicor Music in 2023, following his discovery by an executive from the label during a special on Coke Studio. He released his debut single, "Dalangin", in February of that year. A follow-up to the song, "Tibok", was made available by Vicor on June 16. It was later included on Agustin's debut studio album, Himig at Pag-Ibig, which was released on June 13, 2025.

== Composition and lyrics ==
"Tibok" runs for 5 minutes and 26 seconds. It was produced by Jean-Paul Verona and arranged by Kim Lopez. A midtempo and upbeat track, it is driven by synthesizers with crescendoing R&B beats.

Lyrically, "Tibok" is about the first phases of falling in love, exploring the theme of gradually developing a romantic attachment for someone and hoping that the feelings are mutual. It is based on his personal experience of being ghosted and captures various emotions from that time. Agustin said he wanted to share his honest feelings so that others might relate if they have felt similar emotions.

== Reception ==
Several critics commented on the sound of "Tibok". Mayks Go of Billboard Philippines deemed the song a "groovy [...] funk-pop" tune as well as "heartfelt", a description which The Manila Times also used to label the lyrics and called the track a "blend of pop and ballad". Allan Policarpio from Philippine Daily Inquirer considered "Tibok" a "groovy R&B bop", while Baby A. Gil of The Philippine Star found it "soulful". For the Manila Bulletin, Punch Liwanag said that the song was an "R&B-flavored romp" seemingly imitating Silk Sonic's song "Leave the Door Open" (2021) and believed that it had a "neo soul vibe".

Commercially, "Tibok" became Agustin's breakthrough success. The song received significant attention and became viral on social media platforms such as TikTok, following its usage on the Philippine television series, Ang Mutya ng Section E (2025). It set the record for the highest single-day streams for an OPM song on Spotify, reaching 2.092 million streams. As of June 2025, the song had reached a total of 127 million streams on the platform. On record charts, the track peaked atop on both Billboard Philippines's Philippines Hot 100 and Top Philippine Songs. It entered the International Federation of the Phonographic Industry's Philippine and UAE charts, reaching numbers 1 and number 13, respectively. The song peaked at number 111 on Billboard's Global Excl. US.

== Charts ==
=== Weekly charts ===
Weekly chart performance for "Tibok"
Chart (2025)	Peak position
Global Excl. US (Billboard)	111
Philippines (IFPI)	1
Philippines Hot 100 (Billboard Philippines)	1
Philippines Top Songs (Billboard Philippines)	1
United Arab Emirates (IFPI)	13

=== Year-end charts ===
Year-end chart performance for "Tibok"
Chart (2025)	Position
Philippines Hot 100 (Billboard Philippines)	4
Philippines Top Songs (Billboard Philippines)	3
