= Mariah Deborah =

Filipino singer-songwriter (born 2002)

- Born: Mariah Deborah Cabatbat; March 20, 2002 (age 24); Calasiao, Pangasinan, Philippines
- Genres: Indie pop; OPM
- Occupations: Singer; songwriter; record producer
- Years active: 2020–present

Mariah Deborah Cabatbat (born March 22, 2002), is a Filipino singer-songwriter and record producer from Calasiao, Pangasinan. She began releasing music in 2020 with her debut single "Dangerous Dance", followed by her 2023 debut album i wanna eat your intestines. In 2026, she gained popularity with her single "Na Para Bang" (transl. That Seems Like), which reached number one on the Billboard Philippines Hot 100.

== Early life and education ==
Cabatbat is from Calasiao, Pangasinan, and graduated with a degree in Communication from the University of the Philippines Baguio. She grew up in a musical family. Her parents were singers who met through an orchestra, and she and her older sister often performed at family gatherings.

== Music career ==
Cabatbat began releasing original music in 2020 with "Dangerous Dance". She taught herself music production during the COVID-19 pandemic and produced most of her debut album i wanna eat your intestines, which was released in 2023. She began working on the album in 2022 while attending online classes and recording and producing songs herself.

In February 2026, Cabatbat released "Na Para Bang". The sapphic love song was inspired by a popular internet meme and her experience of developing feelings for a friend. Its lyrics describe the uncertainty of wanting a relationship while fearing that expressing those feelings could affect a friendship. The song became sleeper hit on social media several months after its release. It debuted at number 56 on the Billboard Philippines Hot 100 dated September 26, 2026, and rose to number two the following week before reaching number one on the chart dated October 10. It remained at number one for a second consecutive week on the October 17 chart.

On September 29, 2026, Cabatbat performed on the Wish Bus for the first time, singing "Na Para Bang" and her other songs "Bahagya" (transl. Slightly) and "Hibang" (transl. Insane).

== Influences ==
Cabatbat musical influences include Taylor Swift, whom she has cited for her songwriting, as well as Olivia Rodrigo, Up Dharma Down, and Erin LeCount. She has also named Lady Gaga, Ariana Grande, and Doja Cat among the artists she listens to.

== Personal life ==
Cabatbat is openly queer.

== Discography ==
=== Studio albums ===
Year	Title	Label
2023	I Wanna Eat Your Intestines	Self-released

=== Selected singles ===
List of singles, showing year released, selected chart positions, and associated albums
Title	Year	Peak chart positions		Album	Ref.
Title	Year	PHL	PHL Top	Album	Ref.
"Dangerous Dance"	2020	—	—	—N/a	
"Make Me Remember"	2021	—	—	—N/a	
"Tila Talo"	2022	—	—	I Wanna Eat Your Intestines	
"Hibang"	2025	—	—	—N/a	
"Na Para Bang"	2026	1	1	—N/a	
"Bahagya"	2026	—	198	—N/a	
