= One Click Straight =

Filipino alternative rock band

ONE CLICK STRAIGHT
- Also known as: OCS
- Origin: Parañaque, Philippines
- Genres: indie; alternative; pop rock; post-punk; NU-PM
- Years active: 2009–present
- Labels: Offshore Music; Island/UMG
- Members: Sam Marquez; Toffer Marquez; Tim Marquez; Joel Cartera

ONE CLICK STRAIGHT (also known by its initials OCS) is a Parañaque-based Philippine NU-PM band formed in 2009. The band consists of brothers Sam (vocals/guitar), Toffer (vocals/bass) and Tim Marquez (drums), and their friend Joel Cartera (guitar).

== History ==
=== Early beginnings ===
The band was started in 2009 when the Marquez brothers and Joel Cartera were still in high school years. In 2013, they pursued songwriting and began playing in small shows/venues. They released their first 6-track extended play (EP), Sticks, Stones, and an Apology, originally intended for their one band member's school project at De La Salle–College of Saint Benilde.

In 2015, the band joined Yellow Room's Battle of the Bands competition. 2 years later in 2017, the band released their second EP, Nostalgic.

In 2018, the band officially signed with independent label Offshore Music and released their debut album The Midnight Emotion featuring their lead singles "She" and "Honey".

In 2020, OCS released its third EP, Harana Coma, featuring original all-Tagalog songs.

=== Joining new label, self-titled sophomore album ===
In mid-2020, OCS was among other musical acts who joined UMG Philippines's new imprint label Island Records.

In 2023, the band released their self-titled sophomore album, featuring 14 tracks including lead singles "Wake Me Up", "Hahayaan" and "Untitled 02" among others.

In 2025, the band made their performance at the AXEAN Festival in Bali, Indonesia.

== Musical influences ==
The band influences the alternative and post-punk tune elements from Switchfoot and Foo Fighters.

== Band members ==
- Sam Marquez – vocals/lead guitar
- Toffer Marquez – vocals/bass
- Tim Marquez – drums
- Joel Cartera – guitar

== Discography ==
=== Studio albums ===
List of studio albums with selected details
Title	Album Details
The Midnight Emotion	Released: October 5, 2018 (PH); Label: Offshore Music; Format: Digital download, Streaming media
One Click Straight	Released: January 13, 2023 (PH); Label: Island Records (Universal Music Philippines); Format: Digital download, Streaming media

=== Extended plays ===
List of extended plays with selected details
Title	EP Details
Sticks, Stones, and an Apology	Released: 2013 (PH); Label: Self-released (independent); Format: Compact disc
Nostalgic	Released: March 4, 2017 (PH); Label: Yellow Room Music Philippines; Format: Digital download, Streaming media
Harana Coma	Released: January 24, 2020 (PH); Label: Offshore Music; Format: Digital download, Streaming media
S.S.H.	Released: October 28, 2020 (PH); Label: Island Records (Universal Music Philippines); Format: Digital download, Streaming media
otw / BROke	Released: June 27, 2025 (PH); Label: Island Records (Universal Music Philippines); Format: Digital download, Streaming media

== Accolades ==
Award	Year	Category	Recipient(s)	Result	Ref.
39th Awit Awards	2026	Best Alternative Recording	"Telepono"	Won	
