= Pag-Ibig ay Kanibalismo II =

Single by Fitterkarma

from the album kung tayo’y nasa isang horror na pelikula, tiyak ako ang una mong papatayin
- Language: Tagalog
- English title: Love Is Cannibalism II
- Released: February 14, 2025
- Genre: Pop-rock
- Length: 3:27
- Songwriters: Joao De Leon; Andreanna Therese Pantig
- Producer: Joao De Leon

Fitterkarma singles chronology
"Kalapastangan" (2023)	"Pag-Ibig ay Kanibalismo II" (2025)	"Pag-Ibig ay Kanibalismo I" (2025)

Music video
- "Pag-Ibig ay Kanibalismo II" on YouTube

"Pag-Ibig ay Kanibalismo II" (lit. 'Love Is Cannibalism II') is a song by Filipino alternative rock band Fitterkarma. It was released as a digital single on February 14, 2025. It was written by Joao De Leon and Andreanna Therese Pantig (Note: Also known as Addy Pantig) and produced by the former. The song went viral and entered two Billboard national charts, both peaking at the top of the Top Philippine Songs and Philippines Hot 100. It also topped the Official Philippines Chart.

== Composition ==
The song is three minutes and twenty-seven seconds long, and was written by Joao De Leon and Andreanna Therese Pantig, with production by the former. It is a pop-rock track that is characterized by its bright, punchy emotionality while maintaining a playful tone that differentiates it from standard heartbreak anthems. It features a straightforward chord progression reminiscent of Filipino alternative rock classics such as Moonstar88's "Migraine" and Kitchie Nadal's "Huwag na Huwag Mong Sasabihin".

== Charts ==
Chart performance for "Pag-Ibig ay Kanibalismo II"
Chart (2025–2026)	Peak position
Philippines (IFPI)	1
Philippines Hot 100 (Billboard Philippines)	1
Philippines Top Songs (Billboard Philippines)	1

== Accolades ==
Award	Year	Category	Result	Ref.
Awit Awards	2026	Record of the Year	Won	
Awit Awards	2026	Song of the Year	Nominated	
Awit Awards	2026	Best Performance by a Group	Nominated	
Awit Awards	2026	Best Alternative Recording	Nominated	

== Listicles ==
Name of publisher, year listed, name of listicle, and placement
Publisher	Year	Listicle	Placement	Ref.
Billboard Philippines	2025	25 Best Filipino Songs of 2025	Placed	
The Flying Lugaw	2025	The Best Filipino Songs of 2025	Placed	

== Credits and personnel ==
Credits are adapted from Apple Music.

- Fitterkarma - vocals
- Andreanna Therese Pantig - songwriter, harmony vocals, lead vocals
- Caleb Madison - mastering engineer
- Calvin Borja - guitar, synthesizer, producer, executive producer, mixing engineer, recording engineer
- Daniel Monong - recording engineer
- Joao De Leon - background vocals, harmony vocals, songwriter, producer
- Sanders Bayas - drums, songwriter
- Sophia Miranda - bass, songwriter
