= Fitterkarma =

Filipino rock band

- Fitterkarma in 2025 (from left to right: Addy Pantig, Sanders Bayas (top), Joao de Leon (bottom), Calvin Borja, Sophia Miranda)

Background information
- Also known as: Joao (2019–2023)
- Origin: Metro Manila, Philippines
- Genres: Alternative rock; indie rock; art rock
- Years active: 2023–present
- Members: Joao de Leon; Sophia Miranda; Sanders Bayas; Mikee Mendoza
- Past members: Calvin Borja; Addy Pantig

Fitterkarma (stylized in all lowercase) is a Filipino alternative rock band from Metro Manila, formed in 2023. The band includes Joao de Leon (vocals/guitar), Sophia Miranda (bass), Sanders Bayas (drums), and Mikee Mendoza (guitar). They are known for the songs "Kalapastangan" (2023) and "Pag-Ibig ay Kanibalismo II" (2025), both of which charted on the Billboard Philippines Hot 100. In late 2025, guitarist Calvin Borja and female vocalist Addy Pantig left the band.

== History ==
The project began in 2019 as a solo endeavor by musician Joao de Leon, who performed independently before collaborating with other musicians. Over time, the project expanded into a full band.

=== 2023–2024: Rebranded as Fitterkarma ===
Fitterkarma was formed in 2023 by students from the De La Salle–College of Saint Benilde's music production program, with Joao de Leon as the founder. The band rebranded as Fitterkarma that year, partly due to the difficulty of marketing and pronouncing Joao's name. The band's name was inspired by the English rock band Radiohead, combining the titles of two tracks from their 1997 album OK Computer: "Fitter Happier" and "Karma Police". The band released its debut single "Kalapastangan" (transl. Blasphemy) in 2023. The song appeared on the Billboard Philippines Hot 100 in November 2025. In 2024, Joao wrote the song "Sumpa" with his partner, before recording it in 2025.

=== 2025–present: Breakthrough with "Pag-Ibig ay Kanibalismo II", debut album ===
On February 14, 2025, Fitterkarma released "Pag-Ibig ay Kanibalismo II" (transl. Love Is Cannibalism II). The song also topped Spotify Philippines' Viral 50 chart. The song features vocals from former members Addy Pantig and guitarist Calvin Borja, who left the band prior to its commercial breakthrough. By the end of 2025, it had recorded tens of millions of streams. "Pag-Ibig ay Kanibalismo II" originally started in 2024 as part of Joao's thesis EP for his music production degree while he was in college. In October, the band released "Sumpa" (transl. Curse), a folk-influenced rock single. In December, "Pag-ibig ay Kanibalismo II" reached number one on both the Spotify Philippines Top 50 and the Billboard Philippines Hot 100 and received year-end recognition from Philippine music publications.

In early 2026, Fitterkarma announced the release of the single "Aswang sa Maynila", accompanied by a live launch event at 123 Block in Mandaluyong. The song was written by de Leon with contributions from the band, produced by Xergio Ramos, and features guest vocals from Kai Sevillano of Novocrane. On February 1, the band opened for Canadian indie band Men I Trust on their Equus Tour 2026 at The Filinvest Tent, Alabang.

They released their debut album kung tayo'y nasa isang horror na pelikula, tiyak ako ang una mong papatayin (transl. if we're in a horror movie, surely i will be the first one you will kill) on September 9, 2026.

== Musical style ==
Fitterkarma's music combines indie rock, alternative rock, and art rock, with acoustic and electric guitars, warm vocals, and occasional heavier parts for live shows. The band writes about obsessive or masochistic love, devotion, and emotional struggles, taking inspiration from Philippine folklore and personal experiences. Their songs have been compared to classic horror-themed storytelling in music, like The Cranberries' "Zombie".

== Band members ==
Current members

- Joao de Leon – vocals, guitars
- Sophia Miranda – bass, backing vocals
- Sanders Bayas – drums
- Mikee Mendoza (alias; Lory) – guitars

Former members

- Calvin Borja – guitars
- Addy Pantig (real name; Andreanna Therese Pantig) – keyboardists, vocals

== Discography ==
=== Albums ===
List of albums, with release date
Title	Released	Ref.
kung tayo’y nasa isang horror na pelikula, tiyak ako ang una mong papatayin	2026	

=== EPs ===
List of EPs, with release date
Title	Released	Ref.
pakinggan mo... (Note: Before the band's official formation in 2023, the project existed as a solo effort by Joao de Leon.)	2022	

=== Singles ===
List of singles, showing year released, and peak chart positions
Title	Year	Peak position	Ref.
Title	Year	PHL	Ref.
"Pambihira"	2019	—	
"Kalapastangan"	2023	1	
"Pag-Ibig ay Kanibalismo II"	2025	1	
"Pag-Ibig ay Kanibalismo I"	2025	—	
"Sumpa"	2025	—	
"Aswang sa Maynila"	2026	—	
"maryclaire"	2026	—	
