= Arthur Nery =

Filipino singer

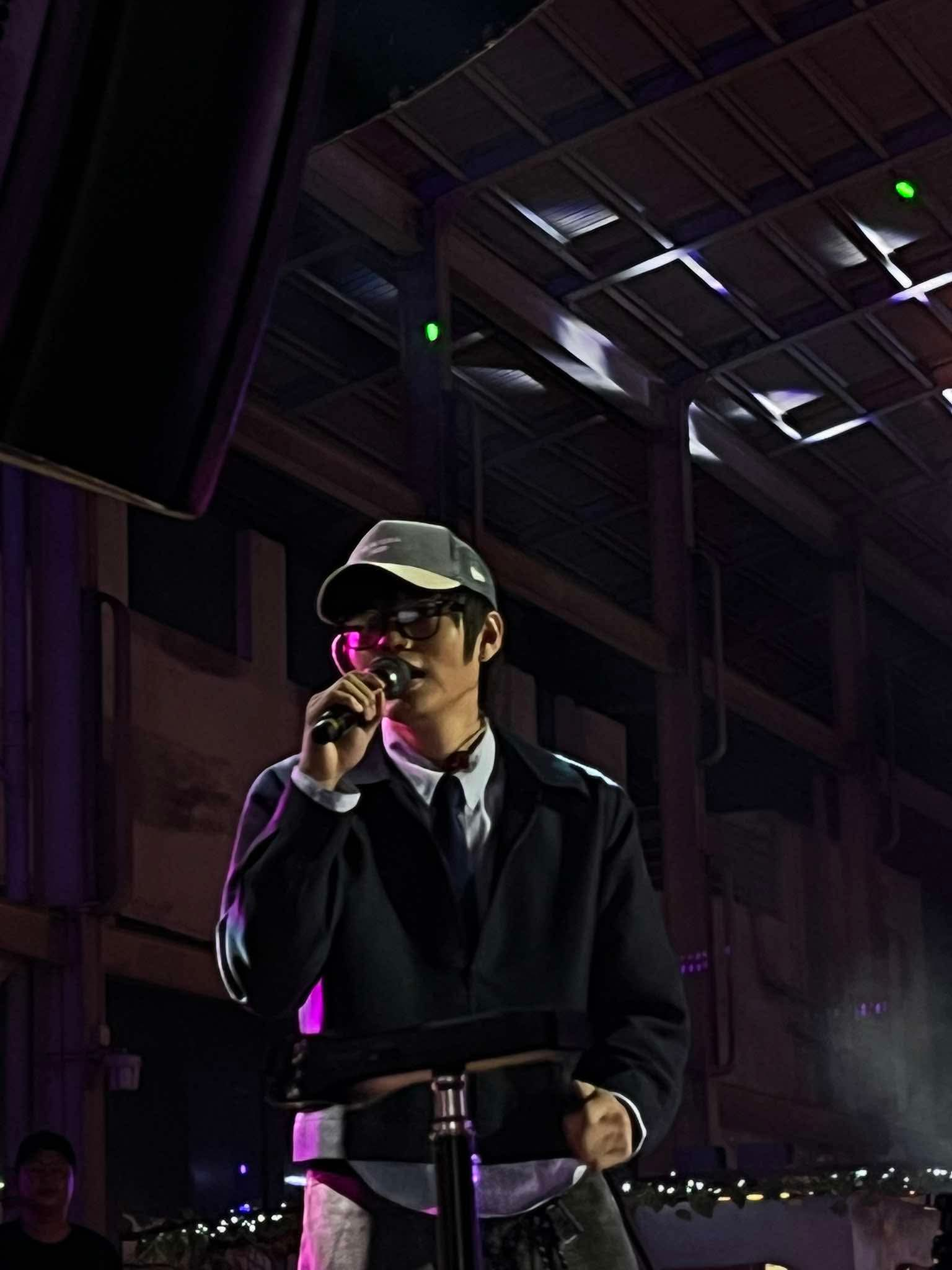
- Nery performing in The Pop Up Katipunan in April 2025

Background information
- Born: Arthur Madrigalejos Nery; January 28, 1997 (age 29); Cagayan de Oro, Philippines
- Genres: R&B; soul; OPM
- Occupations: Singer; songwriter
- Years active: 2018–present
- Label: Viva Records

Arthur Madrigalejos Nery (born January 28, 1997) is a Filipino singer and songwriter. He signed a record deal in 2019 under Viva Records, and released his debut album Letters Never Sent in the same year. He became well known in 2021 for his hit single "Pagsamo".

== Early life and education ==
Nery was born on January 28, 1997 in Cagayan de Oro City to a musical family. Both of his parents were singers. The first time he performed in public was when he was eight years old, where he sang "Fly Me to the Moon" for a cousin's debut party. Even so, a career in music was never considered by Nery at the time.

He started writing songs seriously in high school, and received some formal training in singing after joining the glee club in college. He attended Xavier University — Ateneo de Cagayan and majored in Psychology. Before going full-time in his music career, he trained with call center agents and worked as an online English teacher for Japanese students.

Nery was booked to sing in comedian Wacky Kiray's show in Bukidnon, who later introduced him to Callalily's frontman Kean Cipriano who at the time had just launched his own label, O/C. On the same night, Nery signed with O/C.

== Accolades ==
Award	Year	Category	Recipient(s)	Result	Ref.
Wish Music Awards	2022	Wish Artist of the Year	Arthur Nery	Nominated	
Wish Music Awards	2022	Wishclusive Contemporary R&B Performance of the Year	"Binhi"	Won	
Wish Music Awards	2022	Wish R&B Song of the Year	"Take All The Love"	Won	
Wish Music Awards	2022	Wish Song Collaboration of the Year	"Happy w u" (ft. Jason Dhakal)	Nominated	
Wish Music Awards	2022	Wish Song Collaboration of the Year	"Pelikula" (with Janine Teñoso)	Nominated	
Wish Music Awards	2023	Wish Contemporary R&B Song of the Year	"Pagsamo"	Won	
Wish Music Awards	2023	Wishclusive Elite Circle — Bronze	"Pelikula" (with Janine Teñoso)	Won	
Wish Music Awards	2025	Wish Contemporary R&B Song of the Year	"Segundo, Siguro"	Won	

== Discography ==
=== Studio albums ===
List of studio albums by Arthur Nery
Title	Album details	Ref.
Letters Never Sent	Released: October 27, 2019; Label: O/C Records; Formats: Digital download, streaming	
II: The Second	Released: September 28, 2024; Label: Viva Records; Formats: digital download, streaming	
Fictions You Produce	Released: May 8, 2026; Label: Viva Records; Formats: digital download, streaming	

=== Singles ===
List of singles, with year released, selected chart positions, and album name
Title	Year	Peak chart positions				Album	Ref.
Title	Year	PHL Songs	PHL TOP	HOT 100	IFPI	Album	Ref.
"Life Puzzle"	2019	—	—	—	—	Letters Never Sent	
"Binhi"	2019	—	—	87	—	Letters Never Sent	
"Happy w u" ft. Jason Dhakal	2020	—	—	—	—	Non-album singles	
"Take All the Love"	2021	8	6	15	—	Non-album singles	
"Pagsamo"	2021	4	—	53	—	Non-album singles	
"Isa Lang"	2021	3	6	10	10	Non-album singles	
"Sinag" ft. Sam Benwick	2022	—	—	—	—	Non-album singles	
"o ninanais"	2023	—	—	—	—	II: The Second	
"Turbo" with Manila Grey	2023	—	—	—	—	Non-album single	
"Nasa'king Damdamin"	2023	—	—	—	—	II: The Second	
"Sabik" with DENȲ	2023	—	—	—	—	Non-album singles	
"Mikasa" ft. Janine Berdin	2024	—	—	—	—	Non-album singles	
"Segundo, Siguro"	2024	—	—	—	—	II: The Second	
"Ayaw Baya"	2025	—	—	—	—	Non-album singles	
"Palaisipan" with Loonie	2025	—	5	12	12	Non-album singles	
"Palayo Sa Mundo" with Jolianne	2025	—	12	23	17	Non-album singles	
"Paralisado" ft. Adie	2026	—	—	—	—	Fictions You Produce	
