= Jay R discography =

- Studio albums: 7
- Soundtrack albums: 7
- Compilation albums: 1
- Singles: 54
- Music videos: 13

Filipino singer Jay R has released seven studio albums, one compilation album and fifty-four singles. In 2003, Jay R released his debut album entitled Gameface which was certified Platinum by Philippine Association of the Record Industry (PARI), selling more than 30,000 units in the Philippines. The album was accompanied by the release his debut single, "Design for Luv," which received heavy airplay but did not perform well enough to be a breakthrough hit. Following the first single, he released a Tagalog ballad, "Bakit Pa Ba," written by legendary Filipino composer Vehnee Saturno. The song became his biggest hit to date, peaking at number one on the Philippine charts and earning him a MTV Pilipinas Award for Favorite Male Video in 2004. The following singles, "Kung Mahal Mo Siya" and "Throw Your Hands in the Air" (Remix), were released to further promote the album.

In December 2005, Jay R released an upbeat R&B version of Billy Joel's "Just the Way You Are" as lead single, accompanying his self-titled second album. The album received positive reviews from music critics with Titik Pilipino stating, "I can't find a bad word for Jay R- the artist and the album." The first single was followed by another Tagalog ballad, also written by Saturno, entitled "Ngayo'y Narito." Jay R and its two singles did not perform as well as his previous releases. It was until his 2008 cover album, Soul in Love, that he regained his commercial success as a Platinum-selling artist. The album earned him critical acclaim from music reviewers, awards and accolades from major organizations, and another Platinum certification by the PARI. Early in 2010, he released a fan-requested all-Tagalog album, Jay R Sings OPM Love Classics, which was certified Gold in the Philippines in November 2010. In the same year, he went to Indonesia to record a song in Bahasa for a commercial release in the country. To date, Jay R has sold more than 100,000 albums in the Philippines.

== Albums ==
=== Studio albums ===
Title	Album details	Sales	Certifications
Gameface	Released: August 4, 2003; Label: Universal; Format: Cassette, CD	PHL: 40,000 (physical) (Note: Album sales purely based on PARI certification and equivalent units as of June 2004.); PHL: 42,242 (streaming) (Note: Gameface has accumulated a total streaming count of 52,801,878 (42,242 album-equivalent units) on Spotify as of October 2, 2024.)	PARI: Platinum
Jay R	Released: December 5, 2005; Label: Universal; Format: Cassette, CD, digital download	PHL: 15,000 (physical) (Note: Album sales purely based on PARI certification and equivalent units as of September 2008.); PHL: 10,614 (streaming) (Note: Jay R has accumulated a total streaming count of 13,268,093 (10,614 album-equivalent units) on Spotify as of October 2, 2024.)	PARI: Gold
Christmas Away from Home	Released: November 28, 2006; Label: JAYRS, Universal; Format: CD, digital download		
Soul in Love	Released: January 2008; Label: Universal; Format: CD, digital download	PHL: 30,000 (physical); PHL: 41,171 (streaming) (Note: Soul In Love / Romantic Soul Collection has accumulated a total streaming count of 51,463,808 (41,171 album-equivalent units) on Spotify as of October 2, 2024.)	PARI: Platinum
Jay R Sings OPM Love Classics	Released: February 5, 2010; Label: Homeworkz, Universal; Format: CD, digital download	PHL: 10,000 (physical) (Note: Album sales purely based on PARI certification and equivalent units as of February 2012.); PHL: 17,937 (streaming) (Note: Jay R Sings OPM Love Classics has accumulated a total streaming count of 22,420,901 (17,937 album-equivalent units) on Spotify as of October 2, 2024.)	PARI: Gold
Elevated	Released: October 20, 2014; Label: Homeworkz; Format: CD, digital download, streaming	PHL: 7,500 (Note: Album sales purely based on PARI certification and equivalent units as of present.)	PARI: Gold
Kamusta Ka	Released: May 17, 2018; Label: Homeworkz; Format: digital download, streaming	PHL: 1,070 (Note: Kamusta Ka has accumulated a total streaming count of 1,337,170 (1,070 album-equivalent units) on Spotify as of October 2, 2024.)	

=== Compilation albums ===
Title	Album details	Sales
The Jay R Songbook	Released: May 19, 2015; Label: Homeworkz, Universal; Format: CD, digital download	PHL: 67,387 (Note: The Jay R Songbook has accumulated a total streaming count of 84,234,296 (67,387 album-equivalent units) on Spotify as of October 2, 2024.)

=== Re-releases ===
Title	Album details	Notes
Holiday of Love	Released: November 24, 2008; Label: Homeworkz, Universal; Format: CD, digital download	A re-release of Christmas Away from Home which includes 6 additional covers of Christmas classics.; The album artwork was completely altered from the original release.

== Singles ==
=== As lead artist ===
==== 2000s ====
Title	Year	Album
"Design for Luv" (featuring JD)	2003	Gameface
"Bakit Pa Ba"	2003	Gameface
"Kung Mahal Mo Siya"	2004	Gameface
"Throw Your Hands in the Air" (featuring Krook and JOLO)	2004	Gameface
"Seasons"	2005	Jay R
"Fill the Thirst"	2005	Jay R
"You Make Me Smile" (featuring Jimmy Muna)	2005	Jay R
"Just the Way You Are"	2005	Jay R
"Ngayo'y Narito"	2006	Jay R
"Hey Ma"	2006	Jay R
"Say That You Love Me" (with Kyla)	2006	Say That You Love Me Soundtrack / Beautiful Days
"Almost Paradise" (with Iya Villania)	2006	Footloose: The Musical
"Winter Wonderland"	2006	Christmas Away from Home
"Tito Reny"	2006	Christmas Away from Home
"Tattooed on My Mind" (with D'Sound)	2008	Soul in Love
"No One Else Comes Close"	2008	Soul in Love

==== 2010s ====
Title	Year	Album
"Himala"	2010	Jay R Sings OPM Love Classics
"Ikaw Lamang"	2010	Jay R Sings OPM Love Classics
"Spread the Love" (featuring Jhing)	2010	Holiday of Love
"Give Love on Christmas Day"	2010	Holiday of Love
"Fight for Tomorrow" (with Kyla)	2012	Non-album single
"Falling for You" (featuring Marié Digby)	2013	Elevated
"Tonight" (featuring Mica Javier)	2013	Elevated
"Qrush on You" (with Elmo Magalona and Q-York)	2014	Philpop 2014: Loud & Proud
"Parachute"	2014	Elevated
"You Are Not Alone" (featuring Kyla)	2015	Elevated
"You're the One" (featuring Kris Lawrence and AJ Rafael)	2015	Elevated
"Fast Forward" (with Billy Crawford and Kris Lawrence)	2015	Non-album single
"Laban Pa" (with KZ Tandingan)	2016	Himig Handog P-Pop Love Songs 2016
"Already Mine"	2016	Elevated
"Regalo sa Pasko" (with Kris Lawrence and Daryl Ong)	2016	Non-album single
"Kabilang Dako"	2017	Kamusta Ka
"Take It to Forever" (with Jona and REQ)	2018	Non-album single
"Kamusta Ka"	2018	Kamusta Ka
"Hababng Buhay" (with Kris Lawrence and Billy Crawford)	2018	Kamusta Ka
"Boo"	2019	Non-album single
"Ang Saksi Ko"	2019	Non-album single
"Babae" (with Michael Pangilinan)	2019	Non-album single
"Don't Want Another Silent Night" (with Mica Javier)	2019	Non-album single

==== 2020s ====
Title	Year	Album
"No Pressure"	2020	Non-album single
"Heroes of the World" (with Pink Tan)	2020	Non-album single
"Pangako" (with CLR)	2020	Non-album single
"Seryoso"	2020	Non-album single
"Undeniable" (with Kyla)	2020	Non-album single
"Nothing Better" (with Flava Matikz)	2021	Non-album single
"God Has His Purpose"	2021	Non-album single
"Hinay"	2021	Non-album single
"The Christmas Song" (with Garth Garcia)	2021	Non-album single
"Bae You" (with Kris Lawrence, CLR)	2023	Non-album single
"Blessed"	2023	Non-album single
"Mixed Up" (DannieBoi, Ron Henley, Jay R feat. Q-York)	2023	Non-album single
"Guiding Star"	2023	Non-album single
"Eyes Only for Me" (with Regine Velasquez)	2024	Non-album single
"Ligaw" (with JET)	2024	Non-album single

=== As featured artist ===
List of singles, showing year released, selected chart positions, and associated albums
Title	Year	Peak chart positions		Album
Title	Year	PHL	PHL Top 25	Album
"Back in Time" (with Kyla)	2009	—	—	Heart 2 Heart
"Kaya Natin Ito!" (various artists)	2009	—	—	Non-album single
"Biyahe Tayo" (2011 version) (various artists)	2011	—	—	Non-album single
"Connection" (with Chelo Aestrid and Q-York)	2011	—	—	Love, Life & D'Light
"Kau Dan Aku" (with Drimi)	2011	—	—	Dream of Me
"Kung Para Sa'yo" (with Bendeatha)	2016	—	—	Musika ng Masa
"Walk In My Timbs" (with Ylona Garcia)	2020	—	—	Non-album single
"Sining" (with Dionela)	2024	1	1	Non-album single

== Soundtracks ==
Title	Year	Other artist(s)	Film / TV series
"Happy Together"	2004	—N/a	So... Happy Together
"Almost Paradise"	2005	Iya Villania	Footloose: The Musical
"Footloose"	2005	—N/a	Footloose: The Musical
"Be Mine and I Think I Fell"	2005	—N/a	Hari ng Sablay
"Say That You Love Me"	2006	Kyla	Say That You Love Me
"Dream Girl"	2008	—N/a	Desperadas
"This Ring"	2008	—N/a	Desperadas
"Unwind"	2008	—N/a	Desperadas
"Everything"	2008	—N/a	Desperadas 2
"Wings of a Dream"	2008	—N/a	Desperadas 2
"You to Me Are Everything"	2010	Kyla	You to Me Are Everything
"She"	2010	—N/a	Beauty Queen
"Kaleidoscope World"	2013	—N/a	Kaleidoscope World
"Ayoko sa Dilim"	2013	Jim P	Kaleidoscope World
"L-O-V-E"	2016	—N/a	The Bounce Back

== Other appearances ==
=== As vocalist ===
Title	Year	Other artist(s)	Album
"The Real Karylle"	2005	Karylle, Jimmy Muna	You Make Me Sing
"FYI"	2007	Amber	Amber Davis
"Always"	2008	Iya Villania	Finally
"Back in Time"	2008	Kyla	Heart 2 Heart
"A Song for Mama"	2008	—N/a	Kris Aquino: The Greatest Love
"Right Here Waiting"	2009	Kris Lawrence	Moments of Love
"Dance with My Father"	2010	—N/a	Kris Aquino: Blessings of Love
"Connection"	2011	Chelo Aestrid, Q-York	Love, Life & D'Light
"Kau Dan Aku"	2011	Drimi	Dream of Me
"Dulo ng Dila"	2012	Deejay Poblete	Philpop 2012: The Fourteen Finalists
"Mabuti na Lang"	2013	Salbakuta	Rebirth
"Qrush on You"	2014	Elmo Magalona, Q-York	Philpop 2014: Loud & Proud
"Samantha"	2014	Geo Ong	Non-album single
"Laban Pa"	2016	KZ Tandingan	Himig Handog P-Pop Love Songs 2016
"Kung Para Sa'yo"	2016	Bendeatha	Musika ng Masa

=== As songwriter ===
Title	Year	Artist(s)	Album
"Making Me Crazy"	2004	Kyla	Not Your Ordinary Girl
"Not Your Ordinary Girl"	2004	Kyla, Jimmy Muna	Not Your Ordinary Girl
"The Real Karylle"	2005	Karylle, Jay R, Jimmy Muna	You Make Me Sing
"You Make Me Sing"	2005	Karylle	You Make Me Sing
"Back in Time"	2008	Kyla, Jay R	Heart 2 Heart
"You Make Me Feel"	2008	Kyla	Heart 2 Heart
"Beauty Queen"	2010	Krista Kleiner	Non-album song
"Don't Tie Me Down"	2010	Kyla	Private Affair
"Staying Alive"	2011	Nina, Q-York	Stay Alive
"I'm the One"	2013	Sam Concepcion, Jay R	Infinite
"Journey"	2014	Kyla	Journey

== Music videos ==
Key
•	Denotes music videos co-directed by Jay R

Title	Year	Other performer(s)	Director(s)	Ref.
"Design for Luv"	2003	JD Jr.	Ray Brown	
"Bakit Pa Ba"	2003	None	Unknown	
"Kung Mahal Mo Siya"	2004	None	Unknown	
"Throw Your Hands in the Air"	2004	Krook & JOLO	JET	
"Just the Way You Are"	2005	None	Unknown	
"Ngayo'y Narito"	2006	None	Unknown	
"Say That You Love Me"	2006	Kyla	Jessel Monteverde	
"Tattooed on My Mind"	2008	D'Sound	Unknown	
"Kaya Natin Ito!"	2009	Various artists	Dante Nico Garcia	
"Himala"	2010	None	Treb Monteras II	
"Spread the Love" •	2010	Jhing Sillona	Jay R Mel Camilari	
"Give Love on Christmas Day" •	2010	None	Jay R Mel Camilari	
"Biyahe Tayo" (2011 version)	2011	Various artists	Noel Nieva	
"Connection"	2011	Chelo A. Q-York	Treb Monteras II	
"Falling for You"	2013	Marié Digby	Romson Niega	
"Tonight"	2013	Mica Javier	Romson Niega	
"Mabuti na Lang"	2014	Salbakuta	Cristhian Escolano	
"Qrush on You"	2014	Elmo Magalona; Q-York	Cristhian Escolano	
"Parachute"	2014	None	Cristhian Escolano	
"You Are Not Alone"	2015	Kyla	Cristhian Escolano	
"You're the One"	2015	Kris Lawrence; AJ Rafael	Unknown	
"Fast Forward"	2015	Billy Crawford; Kris Lawrence	Cristhian Escolano	
"Laban Pa"	2016	KZ Tandingan	Marvin F. Nofuente	
"Kung Para Sa'yo"	2016	Bendeatha	Unknown	
"Already Mine"	2016	None	Miggy Tanchanco	
"Regalo sa Pasko"	2016	Kris Lawrence; Daryl Ong	Miggy Tanchanco	
