= Palaisipan =

Single by Loonie featuring Arthur Nery
- Released: August 22, 2025
- Genre: Hip-hop
- Length: 4:01
- Songwriters: Arthur Nery; Marlon Peroramas
- Producer: Yung Bawal

Loonie singles chronology
"Gugmang Preso" (2025)	"Palaisipan" (2025)

Music video
- "Palaisipan" on YouTube

"Palaisipan" (lit. 'Puzzle') is a song by Filipino rapper Loonie featuring Filipino singer-songwriter Arthur Nery. It was released as a digital single on August 22, 2025. Written by Arthur Nery and Marlon Peroramas and produced by Yung Bawal, it is a hip-hop track that explores the vagueness and confusion surrounding situationships. It is also his second collaboration after the release of "Ikigai" with R&B singer-songwriter Dionela.

== Background and release ==
This marks Loonie's latest collaboration after the release of "Ikigai" with R&B singer-songwriter Dionela. He also released his first Bisaya song on June 22, 2025, titled "Gugmang Preso" (lit. 'Imprisoned Love'). According to Loonie and Arthur, they met at Myx Music Awards 2024 while preparing a tribute segment for Gloc-9. After their performance of "Lando", they realized their mutual admiration, inspiring them to collaborate on "Palaisipan".

The song was released on August 22, 2025, along with the music video.

== Composition ==
Written by Arthur Nery and Marlon Peroramas, and produced by Yung Bawal, it is a hip-hop track that explores the vagueness and confusion surrounding situationships. The track incorporates 2000s hip-hop elements. The original slower beat was modified to create a more upbeat sound as per Arthur's intention. It also explores themes of modern romance set to a sensual and groovy beat.

In an interview, Loonie discussed his intention to create a song about situationships, reflecting the common feelings of vagueness and confusion associated with brief hookups and the associated mind games. He shared that after presenting the idea to Arthur, the lyrics came to life effortlessly in the studio.

== Charts ==
Chart performances for "Palaisipan"
Chart (2025)	Peak position
Philippines (IFPI)	4
Philippines (Philippines Hot 100)	7
Philippines (Top Philippine Songs)	3
