= Christmas Away from Home =

2006 album by Jay R

Studio album by Jay R
- Released: November 28, 2006
- Recorded: 2006 at Homeworkz Studio
- Genres: Christmas, pop, R&B
- Length: 32:58 (Standard edition); 48:12 (Re-release)
- Labels: JAYRS, Universal
- Producer: Jay R Sillona (also executive)

Jay R chronology
Jay R (2005)	Christmas Away from Home (2006)	Soul in Love (2008)

Singles from Christmas Away from Home
- 1. "Tito Reny" Released: 2006; 2. "Winter Wonderland" Released: 2006

Christmas Away from Home is the first Christmas album (third overall) by Filipino singer Jay R, released on November 28, 2006, by his own label, JAYRS Music (later renamed as Homeworkz Records). It was distributed by Universal Records. It is an eleven-track Christmas collection containing six classic Christmas songs, two originals and three instrumental versions of three songs in the album. His sister, Jhing, was featured in one song, entitled "Spread the Love".

The album was re-released in 2008, retitled as Holiday of Love. It includes six other traditional Christmas songs as addition, like "O Holy Night" and "Give Love on Christmas Day", replacing the three instrumentals. All its album sales and proceeds were entirely donated to GMA-7's Kapuso Foundation. He stresses the album's title, saying "It's Christmas after all. With an album called Holiday of Love, it's only fitting that I practice what I preach. It's all about giving".

== Own studio and label ==
Christmas Away from Home is the first album recorded by Jay R in his own studio and label. When asked about the idea of owning his own recording studio, he explains "It's a necessity for a recording artist [...] It saves a lot of money in the long run and it's very convenient. You can work on the recordings at any time of the day". His studio is located inside his house, saying "I had to look for a house that was big enough to house a studio [...] I was renting a place just a few blocks away from this house, and the neighbors used to complain about the loud music. This house meets all my requirements."

He initially named his label JAYRS Music, but in 2008, he renamed it as Homeworkz Records, due to the fact that the studio is located inside his house.

== Background and production ==
The Christmas album was actually inspired by Jay R's uncle Reny, who just died not too long ago. He states, "The entire album is actually inspired by him, from the single to the cover to the layout, pictures and video. His death triggered something in me, and I knew that a tribute was the best way to thank him and cherish his legacy". Christmas Away from Home is a jazzy Christmas album that is the perfect album to play during the holidays. It shows killer solos and an outstanding vocal performance by Jay R. "It's a must have.", as said by the critics.

Produced by JAYRS Music and distributed by Universal Records, the new CD also marks his initial attempt at running his own independent record label. Turning himself into a virtual one man production outfit, Jay R single-handedly produced, arranged, mixed, mastered and attended to all details - including the album's layout and art concept. He explains, "It was a tough job to finish. I didn't sleep much because I wanted everything hands-on. I arranged the music then recorded all the session players in my studio, wrote a tribute song for my uncle at the same time setting up in my living room for the photo shoot, then recorded my vocals on all the songs with my featured guests while conceptualizing the layout for the album. Mixed and mastered everything, and then there's the business side to take care of too".

== Critical reception ==
Professional ratings
Review scores
Source	Rating
Titik Pilipino	3/5 stars

Christmas Away from Home did not have enough promotion, ending up uncertified by the Philippine Association of the Record Industry. Although, it received generally mixed to positive critical response. Resty Odon of Titik Pilipino gave the album three out of five stars, expressing how he liked the mixture of Jay R's R&B sound and Christmas sound. He stated, "Correct me if I'm wrong, but I think Jay R is the first local artist to come up with the idea of a local RnB Christmas album [...] I can readily say I like the result". However, he was kind of antagonistic towards the album's sad feel, expressing "Well, one can regard the track "Tito Reny" as a love note, which is hardly a sad thought, although the honesty and earnestness may be too unabashed to the point of embarrassing. Sad songs are just not fitting for Christmas, at least for me".

== Track listing ==
All tracks were single-handedly produced, arranged, mixed and mastered by Jay R.

No.	Title	Length
1.	"Intro"	0:38
2.	"Winter Wonderland"	2:38
3.	"The Christmas Song"	2:56
4.	"This Christmas" (featuring Kris Lawrence)	4:08
5.	"Santa Baby" (featuring Amber)	2:35
6.	"The Little Drummer Boy"	2:34
7.	"Tito Reny"	4:08
8.	"Spread the Love" (featuring Jhing)	3:27
9.	"Winter Wonderland (Instrumental)"	2:40
10.	"The Christmas Song (Instrumental)"	3:00
11.	"This Christmas (Instrumental)"	4:10

== Holiday of Love ==
Holiday of Love

Studio album by Jay R
- Released: November 24, 2008
- Recorded: 2006–2008 at Homeworkz Studio
- Genres: Christmas, pop, R&B
- Length: 48:12
- Labels: Homeworkz, Universal
- Producer: Jay R Sillona (also executive)

Jay R chronology
Soul in Love (2008)	Holiday of Love (2008)	Jay R Sings OPM Love Classics (2008)

Singles from Holiday of Love
- 1. "Spread the Love" Released: October 18, 2010; 2. "Give Love on Christmas Day" Released: December 3, 2010

Holiday of Love is the re-issue of Christmas Away from Home, released on November 24, 2008. It was recorded on Jay R's own studio and label, Homeworkz Records. Although, like Jay R's previous albums, it was still distributed by Universal Records. It consists of six Christmas songs, plus eight of the original release's tracks (which were remixed and remastered).

The album was made available on digital download through iTunes and Amazon.com MP3 Download.

=== Singles ===
- On October 18, 2010, an official music video for Jay R's collaboration with his sister Jhing, entitled "Spread the Love", had its world premiere on YouTube. It was released as his Christmas single for 2010. The song was written by his sister Jhing, and the music video was co-directed by Jay R himself.
- On December 3, 2010, he released his self-directed music video for the classic "Give Love on Christmas Day".

=== Track listing ===
No.	Title	Length
1.	"Holy Night"	3:07
2.	"Do You See What I See?"	5:22
3.	"Give Love on Christmas Day"	4:10
4.	"Sleigh Ride"	4:02
5.	"The Most Wonderful Time of the Year"	4:37
6.	"White Christmas"	3:53
7.	"Intro (O Christmas Tree)"	0:38
8.	"Winter Wonderland"	2:38
9.	"The Christmas Song"	2:56
10.	"This Christmas" (featuring Kris Lawrence)	4:08
11.	"Santa Baby" (featuring Amber)	2:35
12.	"The Little Drummer Boy"	2:34
13.	"Tito Reny"	4:08
14.	"Spread the Love" (featuring Jhing)	3:27

== Release history ==
Country	Release date	Format
Philippines	November 28, 2006	Standard (CD)
Philippines	November 24, 2008	Re-release (CD + new tracks)
