= Soul in Love =

Studio album by Jay R
- Released: January 2008
- Recorded: 2007
- Genre: R&B, Soul, Pop
- Length: 1:13:59
- Label: Universal
- Producer: Kathleen Dy-Go, Ito Rapadas

Jay R chronology
Christmas Away from Home (2006)	Soul in Love (2008)	Jay R Sings OPM Love Classics (2010)

Singles from Soul in Love
- 1. "Tattooed on My Mind" Released: February 2008; 2. "No One Else Comes Close (promo only)" Released: May 2008

Alternative cover
- Soul in Love (Re-release)

Soul in Love is the fourth studio album and second cover album by Filipino singer Jay R, released in January 2008 by Universal Records. The album showcases his vocal quality and range, singing classical R&B and jazz songs that he grew up listening to, like "After the Love Has Gone", "Always and Forever" and "Ain't No Sunshine". It received highly positive reviews from OPM critics, and won numerous awards for his outstanding vocal performance. It has also helped Jay R gain a new audience and fans.

The album was made available on digital download through iTunes and Amazon.com on April 1, 2008. To date, it has been certified Platinum by the Philippine Association of the Record Industry for selling more than 30,000 units in the Philippines.

== Release and promotion ==
Initially, Soul in Love had no promotion. It was until it reached Gold certification that Jay R started promoting the album. He did concerts, mall shows, gigs and TV guestings to advertise the album. He did a Soul in Love Mall Tour on July 4, 2008, performing on malls like Megamall. On July 10, 2008, he went to Japan to further increase in sales and popularity. He also did numerous TV guestings, including one on MYX Live!, where he performed the album's tracks—which include Anita Baker's classic hit "Sweet Love", Quincy Jones' "One Hundred Ways", Heatwave's classic ballad "Always and Forever", and Joe's pop hit "No One Else Comes Close". The episode aired on July 16, 2008, and was hosted by Jett Pangan. On August 1, 2008 (after the album has reached Gold), Soul in Love had its album launch at Eastwood City, Libis. Also in August 2008, he guested on SiS, performing "No One Else Comes Close".

=== Singles ===
"Tattooed on My Mind" was released early in 2008 as the album's first single. It features D'Sound, the band who originally recorded and released the song, becoming their most popular and biggest single. Jay R sang the song as a duet with the band's vocalist. The music video also features the band, and only shows footage from the recording sessions of the song. It was shot in 2006 during D'Sound's Philippine Tour, promoting their album My Today. The single charted on both music video and radio charts, but did not perform as well as Jay R's past releases. "No One Else Comes Close", originally recorded by American R&B singer Joe, was released in the summer of 2008 as a radio-only single. It received positive reception and became a favorite on radio stations.

== Reception ==
Professional ratings
Review scores
Source	Rating
Titik Pilipino	5/5 stars

=== Commercial performance ===
Soul in Love has received the highest ratings among Jay R albums, and has even sold impressively, remaking the commercial success that was achieved by his debut album, Gameface. On July 13, 2008, the album was certified gold by the PARI for selling above 15,000 copies in the Philippines. Its awarding was held on GMA-7's TV musical variety show, SOP. Before the album was launched in August 2008, it was already certified gold. Early in 2009, the album reached Platinum status by the PARI, selling over 30,000 units in the country.

=== Critical response ===
Not only did the album sell well, but it also received overwhelming positive reviews by OPM critics. Lorelie Dino of Titik Pilipino gave the album a perfect rating of five out of five stars, saying "As everybody should be well aware of by now, Jay R is a very talented artist". She added "He is not just a typical Fil-Am boy, but someone you’d take much pleasure in listening to and be entertained by". She listed her ten most favorite tracks from the album, explaining "I’ll only list down my top 10, otherwise I’d end up enumerating all the tracks". The list includes "Tender Love", "No One Else Comes Close", and "Two Occasions" as her top three. The review ended up with Dino, stating "Soul in Love is definitely a must-have collection".

The album has earned Jay R numerous awards and nominations on musical events. On the fourth Philippine Hip-Hop Awards held at One Ayala, Intercontinental Manila in 2008, he won the R&B Artist of the Year award for the first time, succeeding previous title holder, Nina. On the ASAP 24K Awards 2008, the album was given a recognition for certifying gold by the PARI. On the first ever Wave 89.1 Urban Music Awards in 2009, he was nominated on four categories including Best Male Soul/R&B Artist and Best Remake for "Tattooed on My Mind" with D'Sound. However, he lost Best Male to Marcus Davis and Best Remake to Thor and Amber's "Spend My Life with You". On the 2009 ASAP Platinum Circle, the album was recognized for reaching Platinum status. Unfortunately, GMA-7 did not allow the singer to attend the event of their rival TV station.

== Track listing ==
All tracks were produced by Ito Rapadas.

No.	Title	Writer(s)	Original artist(s)	Length
1.	"One Hundred Ways"	Tony Coleman, Kathy Wakefield, Benjamin Wright	Quincy Jones	4:19
2.	"Just to See Her"	Jimmy George, Lou Pardini	Smokey Robinson	3:59
3.	"You Make Me Feel Brand New"	Thomas Bell, Linda Creed	The Stylistics	4:49
4.	"Love Won't Let Me Wait"	Vinnie Barrett, Bobby Eli	Major Harris	4:40
5.	"Always and Forever"	Rod Temperton	Heatwave	5:33
6.	"After the Love Has Gone"	Bill Champlin, David Foster, Jay Graydon	Earth, Wind & Fire	4:02
7.	"No One Else Comes Close"	Joe Thomas, Gary Baler, Darrel Perry	Joe	3:48
8.	"Time Will Reveal"	El Debarge, Bunny Debarge	El DeBarge	4:31
9.	"She's Out of My Life"	Tom Bahler	Michael Jackson	3:33
10.	"Two Occasions"	Kenny Edmonds, Darnell Bristol, Sidney Johnson	The Deele	4:15
11.	"Sweet Love"	Anita Baker, Gary Bias, Louis Johnson	Anita Baker	3:36
12.	"What You Won't Do for Love"	Bobby Caldwell, Alfons Kettner	Bobby Caldwell	4:04
13.	"What's Going On"	Marvin Gaye	Marvin Gaye	4:29
14.	"Ain't No Sunshine"	Bill Withers	Bill Withers	2:44
15.	"Neither One of Us"	Jim Weatherly	Jim Weatherly	4:20
16.	"Tender Love"	James Harris, Terry Lewis	Force MD's	3:01
17.	"You Are My Lady"	Barry Eastmond	Barry Eastmond	4:04
18.	"Tattooed on My Mind" (with D'Sound)	D'Sound	D'Sound	4:04

== Personnel ==
- Arnold Buena - arranger
- Barbi Chan - grooming
- Kathleen Dy-Go - executive producer
- Fred Garcia - arranger, piano
- Gil Losenada - instrumental tracks recording
- Mister Eazy - drums
- Edward Picache - saxophone, flute
- Janno Queyquep - guitar tracks
- Ito Rapadas - album producer, mixing and digital mastering, arranger
- Jay'C Rivera - album design
- Rickson Ruiz - drums
- Ronnie Salvacion - photography
- Jay R Sillona - lead vocals, back-up vocals
- Dante Tanedo - instrumental tracks recording, mixing and digital mastering
- Bobby Velasco - arranger
- Willy Villa - instrumental tracks recording, mixing and digital mastering
  - Soundstrite Studio (Makati, Philippines) - drums and vocals recording (track 18)
  - U.R. Recording Studio (Quezon City, Philippines) - instrumental tracks recording, mixing and digital mastering

== Certifications ==
Country	Provider	Certification	Sales
Philippines	PARI	Platinum	30,000+

== Release history ==
Country	Release date	Format
Philippines	February 2008	Standard (CD)
United States	April 1, 2008	Standard (digital download)
