= Kaya Natin Ito! =

"Kaya Natin Ito! (We can do it!)"

Single by Various Artists
- Genre: Pop
- Length: 4:23
- Songwriters: Jessie Lasaten, Mike Idioma

"Kaya Natin Ito!" (We Can Do It!) is a charity single made to benefit the victims of the Typhoon Ondoy (Ketsana) and Typhoon Pepeng (Parma) in 2009 that killed more than half a million people all over the country.

== Song information ==
The song was written by Ogie Alcasid, a famous singer/composer in the Philippines. This song was served as an inspiration to all victims to stand up and continue the journey. From the overflowing rivers to raging flashfloods in the Metro Manila area, up to the non-stop rains in the Northern Luzon came up with thousands of death, loss of belongings and much poverty. The song was sung by more than 50 Filipino artists, including their well-known artists like Lea Salonga, Gary Valenciano, Regine Velasquez, Sharon Cuneta, Martin Nievera, Jaya and many more. Alcasid also made part of the song.

== Artists for Ondoy and Pepeng Victims ==
Composer

- Ogie Alcasid

Soloists/Choirs (in order of appearance)

- The Opera
- Ogie Alcasid
- Jose Mari Chan
- Janno Gibbs
- Rachelle Ann Go
- Jinky Vidal
- Michael V.
- Sarah Geronimo
- Jay R
- Jolina Magdangal
- Christian Bautista
- La Diva
- Gary Valenciano
- Martin Nievera
- Regine Velasquez
- Vina Morales
- Rachel Alejandro
- Geneva Cruz
- KC Concepcion
- Jett Pangan
- Dingdong Avanzado
- Randy Santiago
- Agot Isidro
- Gino Padilla
- Jaya
- Jay Durias
- Gian Magdangal
- Lovi Poe
- Chris Cayzer
- Yeng Constantino
- Karylle
- Luke Mejares
- Viktoria
- Sitti
- Wency Cornejo
- The Company
- Noel Cabangon
- Amber Davis
- Aiza Seguerra
- Richard Poon
- Renz Verano
- Jan Nieto
- Denise Laurel
- Bo Cerrudo
- Kris Lawrence
- Duncan Ramos
- Josh of Freestyle
- Iya Villania
- Lea Salonga
- Rico Blanco
- Nina
- Joey Generoso of Side A
- Charice
- Arnel Pineda
- Piolo Pascual
- Kyla
- Aga Muhlach
- Moymoy Palaboy
- Frenchie Dy
- Erik Santos
- Jed Madela
- Mark Bautista
- Zsa Zsa Padilla
- Juris
- Pops Fernandez
- Sharon Cuneta
- Nonito Donaire
- Bing Loyzaga
- The Ryan Cayabyab Singers
- Thor
- Mae Flores
- Miguel Escueta

Adlibs

- Gary Valenciano
- Janno Gibbs
- Rico Blanco
- Christian Bautista
- Nina
- Jed Madela
- Thor
- Montet Acoymo
- Josephine Gomez
- Regine Velasquez

Rap

- Andrew E.

Anne Curtis had a silent cameo in the music video.
