= Marilag =

Single by Dionela
- Language: Filipino; English
- Released: November 8, 2024
- Genre: R&B
- Length: 2:37
- Label: UMG
- Songwriter: Dionela
- Producer: Dionela

Dionela singles chronology
"Sining" (2024)	"Marilag" (2024)	"Ikigai (with Loonie)" (2025)

Marilag (transl. Majestic) is a single written and produced by Dionela. It was released as a digital single on November 8, 2024, through Universal Music Group Philippines.

== Background ==
Dionela released the single "Sining" (Art) on June 7, 2024. It secured the number one spot on the Philippines Hot 100 chart for four consecutive weeks. It also garnered over 64 million streams, with 7.7 million monthly listeners, making Dionela the OPM artist with the most monthly listeners on the platform.

After the successful of the single, He released a song as a standalone single on November 8, 2024.

== Composition ==
"Marilag" is a two minutes and thirty-seven seconds long composed and produced by Dionela. It was described as an R&B song that explored themes of the ethereal beauty and divine presence of a special someone.

== Commercial performance ==
Following its release on November 8, 2024, "Marilag" debuted on Billboard Philippines Top Philippine Songs at number twenty-three on November 23. In December, the single secured number one on Top Philippine Songs and became a viral hit single.

On January, the International Federation of the Phonographic Industry (IFPI) announced the launching of the Official Philippine Chart and "Marilag" became the honor track in the Philippines.

== Reception ==
In December 2025, Spotify Philippines included "Marilag" among its Top Local Songs of the year, placing third. It was also recognized by Apple Music Philippines among its Top OPM Songs of the year, placing second.

== Charts ==
=== Weekly charts ===
Weekly chart performance for "Marilag"
Chart (2024–2025)	Peak position
Philippines (IFPI)	1
Philippines Hot 100 (Billboard Philippines)	1
Philippines Top Songs (Billboard Philippines)	1
United Arab Emirates (IFPI)	12

=== Year-end charts ===
2025 year-end chart performance for "Marilag"
Chart (2025)	Position
Philippines Hot 100 (Billboard Philippines)	2
Philippines Top Songs (Billboard Philippines)	2

== Accolades ==
Award	Year	Category	Result	Ref.
Awit Awards	2025	Best Performance by a Solo Artist	Nominated	
Awit Awards	2025	Best R&B Recording	Nominated	
Filipino Music Awards	2025	People’s Choice Awards: Song	Nominated	
Filipino Music Awards	2025	R&B Song of the Year	Won	
Filipino Music Awards	2025	Song of the Year	Nominated	
P-pop Music Awards	2025	Song of the Year	Nominated	
PMPC Star Awards for Music	2026	Song of the Year	Nominated	
Wish Music Awards	2026	Wish R&B Song of the Year	Won	
