= Q-York =

- Origin: Queens, New York, U.S.
- Genres: Hip hop, R&B
- Years active: 2001–present
- Members: Flava Matikz; Knowa Lazarus

Q-York is a Filipino-American hip hop/R&B record production duo composed of Flava Matikz (DJ/producer) and Knowa Lazarus (songwriter/MC). The name Q-York stands for "Quality – Yields Our Richest Key" and also Queens, New York where the group was founded in 2001. They have released numerous albums, appeared on various compilations/mixtapes worldwide and are the official MC / DJ for the FIBA 3x3 basketball tournament all throughout Asia.

== Influences ==
Q-York was first inspired to make music through the sounds of the Golden age hip hop of the 1980s and 1990s in New York. They also spent time on the West Coast and were students of both the Los Angeles and Bay Area hip hop scene. Their versatility and flexibility in listening to all styles of music incorporates their open-mindedness into their sound.

Although they are mostly known for their uptempo dance tracks, their overall sound remains diverse and has been described in the Philippines as having a "local-feel with international appeal". They compose their music primarily in English but they also fuse Tagalog within their songs. Specialists in "Taglish" (a mixture of English and Tagalog), they utilize catchphrases and specific words into their songs as a way of expressing their culture.

In their songs, the group emphasizes self-empowerment, positivity, spirituality and pride in their heritage. Their lyrics also address the issues and struggles of Filipino people worldwide in an attempt to bring unity to the divisions within their community.

== Biography ==
Knowa Lazarus and Flava Matikz met in Queens, New York. Knowa Lazarus needed a DJ for one of his shows and a friend of his referred their cousin "DJ Flava" to him. They did a few shows together in New Jersey and New York then went their separate ways. Two years passed and Lazarus was in process of recording his demo tape and majoring in Management of Music Enterprise at Baruch College, NYC. Flava Matikz, who was majoring in Music Technology at Queensborough Community College called Lazarus to inform him he was now making beats.

They rented out a studio, recorded their first song together, then proceeded to build a home studio in Matikz' home in Woodside, Queens, New York. They released two EPs and an independent album – Let The Truth Be Told, and from 2001 to 2002 toured the East and West Coast. They generated a small buzz and gained the attention of NBA basketball player, Ron Artest, who had his own record company Tru Warier Records. Through Artest they were able to collaborate with Nature (formerly of The Firm), Canibus, Allure, among others.

In early 2003 they relocated to Los Angeles, where they started their own CD/DVD manufacturing and web/graphic design businesses with T.H.E. Menace and other Q-York Senate members. As a web/graphic design company they designed websites for 50 Cent, Remy Martin, Funkmaster Flex and other hip hop artists. As a CD/DVD manufacturing company they worked with top West Coast DJs, reproducing CDs for the likes of DJ Vice, Big Syphe & Eric D-lux, DJ Turbulence, and many others. Artistically, on the West Coast they collaborated with Far East Movement, Diamonique, Dirty Birdy, Andre Nickatina, Equipto, San Quinn, Bambu (of Native Guns), Roscoe Umali, among others. In California they have released five albums – Step Ya Game Up Rapper Vol. 1 (2003), Jose Rizal (2005), How The Q-West Was One (2006) (a collaboration with DJ Lady Tribe), Step Ya Game Up Rapper Vol. 2 (2006), and L.I.F.E. – Lyrics Inspired From Experience (2008).

In 2006 in search of a deeper purpose for their artistic talents, they began volunteering for Gawad Kalinga and speaking to public school youth about positivity through hip hop in San Diego, California. Through their advocacy they met the Philippine All Stars when they were competing in the US for the World Hip Hop Dance Championships. They collaborated with some of the members of the Philippine All Stars and recorded a song, "Caught Up" (sampling 112's song "Cupid"), which was released in the Philippines, and which made the top 10 on the Wave 89.1 chart. Lazarus and Matikz then decided to visit the Philippines, and toured with the Philippine All Stars for two months in 2007. Visiting their motherland for the first time, they fell in love and felt they discovered the true purpose for their passion.

They both worked and saved money for a year and by late 2008, they had sold everything of theirs that wasn't needed and bought a one-way ticket to the Philippines. In 2009 they collaborated with the Philippine All Stars, AF Benaza and Jerome B Smooth and shot the music video for the song "Mainit" (Hot) which featured Kenjhons and Chelo Aestrid. The group exploded onto the Philippine music scene and garnered many nominations and awards for "Mainit" – Best Music Video (MYX Music Awards), Best Hip Hop Music Video (Urban Music Awards), and Hip-Hop Artist of the Year (Radio Music Awards). They performed as opening act for the Pussycat Dolls Live in Manila concert in 2009, and for APEC's after party in Singapore in November 2009, as front act for the Shock Value Tour in Manila with Timbaland, Justin Timberlake and JoJo. In 2010 Q-York performed along with Young JV during the Supafest Concert in Manila featuring T-Pain, Kelly Rowland, Sean Kingston and Flo Rida. In 2011 they performed along with Jay-R and Chelo Aestrid at MYX Mo 2011.

In November 2010, Q-York was chosen as one of the top selected performers and songwriters of the 7101 Music Nation Camp along with Gary Valenciano, Rico Blanco, Jim Paredes, Jay Durias, Gary Granada, Ryan Cayabyab and many other OPM legends. Through the influence of their mentors at the camp they expanded their musicality and began to see themselves as more than just hip hop artists. In the Philippines they have collaborated/produced for talents such as Ogie Alcasid, Jay-R, Krista Kleiner, Chelo Aestrid, Young JV, Dannie Boi, Nina Girado, Gloc-9 & Paloma Esmeria.

In 2011, Q-York garnered the attention of the Philippines' "Platinum Prince of R&B", Jay-R. After a few meetings together, they signed a distribution deal for their album Q-York City with Jay-R's label Homeworkz, a sub-label of Universal Records (Philippines). Their first album to be released with the label was Q-York City.

In 2014, the group released their second album titled Q-Labonation which features collaborations with other artists such as Ogie Alcasid, Sponge Cola and Yeng Constantino. On March 19, the group's song entry "Qrush On You" was named as one of the finalists that will compete in the third Philippine Popular Music Festival. On May 29, Jay-R and Elmo Magalona were revealed as the featured artists on the song.

== Discography ==
- Let the Truth Be Told - Knowa Lazarus & the Q-York Senate (2002)
- Step Ya Game Up Rapper Vol. 1 - Knowa Lazarus (2003)
- What We Listen To [Queens] - Flava Matikz (2003)
- What We Listen To [Brooklyn] - Flava Matikz (2003)
- Q.S.A. The Dawn of Domination - Q-York (2004)
- Jose Rizal - Knowa Lazarus (2005)
- How the Q-West Was One - Knowa Lazarus & Lady Tribe (2005)
- Step Ya Game Up Rapper Vol. 2 - Knowa Lazarus (2006)
- L.I.F.E. (Lyrics Inspired from Experience) - Knowa Lazarus (2008)
- We Got That - T.H.E Matikz (2008)
- Q-York City - Q-York (2011)
- Q-Labonation (2014)
- Q-Labonation: Addendum (2015)
- The Philippine Dream (2016)

== Media appearances ==
- Multiple appearances on ABS-CBN's ASAP
- GMA's Party Pilipinas
- TV5's PO5 weekend show
- MYX music channel
- MTV Philippines Boracay Beach Party
- ETC A-List Event Series
- ABS-CBN's TV Patrol
- Kabuhayang Swak na Swak
- Ruffa & Ai
- Unang Hirit
- Mutya Ng Pilipinas 2010 Beauty Pageant (ABS-CBN)
- Pulp Magazine
- The Philippine Star
- ESPN The Magazine
- Music Uplate Live
- Walang Tulugan with the Master Showman

== Awards ==
- "Mainit" - Most Requested on MYX Philippines & MTV Philippines
- "Mainit" - Music Video of the Year - 2010 Wave 89.1 Urban Music Awards
- "Mainit" - Single of the Year - Philippine Hip Hop Awards 5
- "Q-York" - Best Urban Group - 2012 Wave 89.1 Urban Music Awards
- "Lead The Way" - Best Hip Hop Song - 1st KBPPop Music Festival 2012
- "Lead The Way" - Grand Prize Winner - 1st KBPPop Music Festival 2012
- "Connection" - Best Dance Recording (Chelo A. featuring Q-York and JayR) - 25th Awit Awards 2012
- "Q-York" - Best Urban Group - 2013 Wave 89.1 Urban Music Awards
- "Qrush On You" - Top 12 Finalist - PhilPop 2014
- “Wow - Roxee B ft. Q-York” - Best Music Video - 2014 Wave 89.1 Urban Music Awards
