= Jay R Sings OPM Love Classics =

Sings OPM Love Classics

Studio album by Jay R
- Released: February 5, 2010
- Recorded: 2009–January 2010
- Genre: Pop, OPM
- Length: 1:00:44
- Language: Tagalog
- Label: Homeworkz, Universal
- Producer: Kathleen Dy-Go, Ito Rapadas

Jay R chronology
Soul in Love (2008)	Sings OPM Love Classics (2010)	TBA

Singles from Jay R Sings OPM Love Classics
- 1. "Himala" Released: February 4, 2010; 2. "Ikaw Lamang" Released: June 2010; 3. "Muli (radio only)" Released: September 2010

Jay R Sings OPM Love Classics is the fifth studio album and third cover album by Filipino singer Jay R, released on February 5, 2010 by Universal Records. The album was produced by Ito Rapadas, who was also behind the production of Soul in Love. It consists of thirteen Tagalog songs, which were originally recorded by popular OPM acts in the 80's and 90's, handpicked by Jay R himself.

The album was released on digital download through iTunes on February 20, 2010, and Amazon.com on February 8, 2010.

== Background ==
Jay R took the local music-biz by storm, when his smash ballad "Bakit Pa Ba" became one of the biggest OPM ballads of 2003. He was crowned the "Philippines' Prince of R&B", because of his smooth and soulful vocal styling, which eventually spawned several local clones. His debut album Gameface was certified Platinum and he became a household name. Movies, commercial endorsements, gigs and regular TV stints came his way and a new OPM superstar was born. His Gold-certified self-titled second album produced another hit "Ngayo'y Narito", but it was his 2008 album Soul in Love that surprised everyone in the music industry. The album is filled with a solid track list, unbelievable instrumentation, a great live feel and an outstanding vocal performance. It's no wonder it became one of the biggest albums of 2008, and also solidified his status as Platinum recording artist, when the album became his second Platinum record. With Soul in Love, he was able to capture a new audience with his easy listening vocal style, without losing his signature soulful delivery.

Although he still has problems in speaking fluent Filipino language, recording an all-Tagalog album has always been his dream. A line which states, "Growing up as a Filipino musician in a foreign land, it has always been my lifelong goal to record an OPM album", can be found on the album's sleeve.

== Production ==
=== Songs ===
All of the thirteen songs in the album were handpicked by Jay R himself, and for the first time, he decided to record an all-Tagalog album as a tribute to some of the biggest OPM hitmakers during the 80's and 90's. Songs from OPM luminaries like Basil Valdez, Sharon Cuneta, Martin Nievera, Gary Valenciano, Regine Velasquez, Jaya, Zsa Zsa Padilla, Ogie Alcasid and even bands like Rivermaya, True Faith, I-Axe, South Border are given the "Jay R touch" and will surely appeal to his fans and OPM music lovers alike. The album features his collaboration with the first Filipino Female Diamond Artist and "Asia's Soul Siren" Nina in the track "Muli", while the carrier single is the 1996 Rivermaya classic, "Himala".

=== Recording ===
Jay R did the selection of songs for the album himself. He personally loved the songs that he chose, but admitted the challenges of remaking these materials, having said that they already have their respective places in the music industry. He stated that he wanted to change just little and very few of the melody and arrangement of the songs, because these songs already have identities marked in them. He also said that the album is his gift to his fans, as they were the ones who made his first Tagalog single "Bakit Pa Ba" a huge hit.

The album features "Asia's Soul Siren" Nina on the song "Muli". Jay R kept on saying that there's a magic with the song and that they have a good chemistry, although they did not record the song together. There were conflicts in schedule and they had to record it at a different place and time. He just gave a guide for Nina's parts on the song and sent them to her.

== Reception ==
Professional ratings
Review scores
Source	Rating
Inquirer Entertainment	(positive)

Jay R Sings OPM Love Classics performed well, placing in the top 10 of CD retailers in the country. Like Soul in Love, it also received high positive response from music critics and listeners. On a review given by Pocholo Concepcion of Inquirer Entertainment, he praised Jay R's outstanding vocal performance. He stated, "The singer (Jay R) is gifted with a voice suited for classy, urban R&B and he practically breezes through most of the ballads". He was also impressed with the tandem of Jay R and Nina, saying "His duet with Nina in Gary Valenciano’s "Muli" should make Nyoy Volante green with envy". The review ended with Concepcion, praising the songs "Paalam Na" and "Wala na Bang Pag-ibig", saying "But it’s the love-lost tunes [...] that shine best under Jay R’s command".

On the second PMPC Star Awards for Music in 2010, Jay R won the R&B Artist of the Year award for the album. Also on the second Wave 89.1 Urban Music Awards in 2010, he was nominated for Best Male Soul/R&B Artist. In the Myx Music Awards 2011, "Himala" was nominated for Favorite Remake. On the 24th Awit Awards in 2011, the album earned two nomination. "Muli", his duet with Nina, was nominated for Best Collaboration, while the album was nominated for Album of the Year.

== Track listing ==
All tracks were produced by Ito Rapadas.

No.	Title	Original artist(s)	Length
1.	"Himala"	Rivermaya	3:29
2.	"Ako'y Sa'yo, Ika'y Akin"	I-Axe	5:13
3.	"Ikaw Lamang"	Zsa Zsa Padilla	4:37
4.	"Paalam Na"	Rachel Alejandro	4:55
5.	"Muli" (with Nina)	Gary Valenciano and Regine Velasquez	5:27
6.	"Kahit Kailan"	South Border	5:20
7.	"Huwag na Lang Kaya"	True Faith	3:22
8.	"Sa Isip Ko"	Agot Isidro	4:13
9.	"Sa Kanya"	Ogie Alcasid	4:36
10.	"Ikaw Lang ang Mamahalin"	Joey Albert	3:14
11.	"Sana Ay Ikaw na Nga"	Basil Valdez	4:07
12.	"Wala na Bang Pag-ibig"	Jaya	4:18
13.	"Hagkan"	Sharon Cuneta	3:37

Re-release bonus track
No.	Title	Original artist(s)	Length
14.	"Dance with My Father"	Luther Vandross	4:10

== Certifications ==
Country	Provider	Certification	Sales
Philippines	PARI	Gold	10,000+

== Release history ==
Country	Release date	Format
Philippines	February 5, 2010	Standard (CD)
Philippines	May 2010	Re-release (CD + bonus track)
United States	February 20, 2010	Standard (digital download)
