= Dionela =

Filipino singer-songwriter and musician (born 1999)

- Born: Timothy Dionela; March 14, 1999 (age 27); Guiguinto, Bulacan, Philippines
- Genres: R&B; alternative R&B
- Occupations: Musician; songwriter
- Instruments: Vocals; guitar
- Years active: 2022–present
- Labels: UMG Philippines (Republic, EMI)
- Spouse: Meizy Joaquin Mendoza (m. 2026)

Timothy Dionela (born March 14, 1999), known professionally by his last name as Dionela (/daɪˈɔːnɛlə/), is a Filipino singer-songwriter and musician. His 2024 singles "Sining" (featuring Jay R) and "Marilag" reached number one on Billboard Philippines Hot 100.

== Early years ==
Dionela was born in Guiguinto, Bulacan. He began singing at the age of three. Both of his parents are music teachers.

== Career ==
Dionela made his debut in 2019 with the single "Tears". In 2022, he joined the UMG Philippines roster under its Republic Records local imprint and released his singles "153" and "Musika" (lit. 'Music'). In November 2023, he was the guest performer in Zack Tabudlo's The Morning Tour.

In 2024, he and other Republic artists were transferred to the EMI imprint within UMG.

On June 7, 2024, he released his new single "Sining" (lit. 'Art') featuring R&B artist Jay R, which became popular due to its accompanied music video (which also marked his directorial debut) which was released a month later. The song landed on the Billboard Philippines Hot 100 and became number one since August 3, 2024. It also gained over 56 million streams on Spotify. Later that year, he released another single, "Marilag" (lit. 'Beautiful').

In December 2024, "Sining" was recognized as the Top 5 music video of 2024 on YouTube in the Philippines. It was also recognized by Spotify as its Top 3 Song in the Philippines for 2024, and by Google as its most searched song in the Philippines for the year.

In January 2025, "Marilag" became the first single to top the new International Federation of the Phonographic Industry Official Philippines Chart.

In February 2025, Aurora Music Festival announced that Dionela would perform in the second day of the music festival's 2025 iteration, which was held on May 3 and May 4 in Clark, Pampanga.

At the inauguration of The Official Philippines Chart on February 19, Dionela was recognized as its top six Local Artist of the Year, while "Sining" was recognized as its top three Local Song of the Year.

In June 2025, Dionela embarked on his "The Grace World Tour", with stops in multiple cities in the United States, Canada, Australia, the United Arab Emirates and the Philippines, where his first solo concert is scheduled at the New Frontier Theater in Quezon City on November 21, 2025. He subsequently pledged the proceeds from the tour towards victims of Typhoon Fung-wong (Super Typhoon Uwan) in early November. In September 2025, he released a collaboration with Alex Bruce, titled "Fall Season", at the Coke Studio 2025 concert at the Araneta Coliseum in Quezon City.

In December, Dionela was designated by Billboard Philippines as the second leading artist of 2025. He was also designated by Spotify Philippines among its Top Local Artists of 2025, placing fourth, while "Marilag" was among its Top Local Songs of the year, placing third. "Marilag" and "Sining" were also recognized by Apple Music Philippines among its Top OPM Songs of 2025, placing second and fourth respectively.

== Personal life ==
During his "The Grace World Tour" in November 2025, Dionela became engaged to Meizy Mendoza, and they married in March 2026. In November 2026, Dionela announced that he and Mendoza were expecting their first child.

== Influences ==
Dionela's musical influences include Ginuwine, Ne-Yo, Destiny's Child, Bruno Mars, The Weeknd and H.E.R.

== Discography ==
=== Singles ===
List of singles, showing year released, selected chart positions, and associated albums
Title	Year	Peak chart positions		Album	Ref.
Title	Year	PHL	TPS	Album	Ref.
"Tears"	2019	—	—	Non-album singles	
"Akala"	2019	—	—	Non-album singles	
"Agaw"	2019	—	—	Non-album singles	
"Horror"	2020	—	—	Non-album singles	
"Gone"	2020	—	—	Non-album singles	
"Stay The Night" (featuring EJ Flor)	2020	—	—	Non-album singles	
"Oo Na, Kayo Na (Agaw)"	2020	—	—	Non-album singles	
"Sugal"	2021	—	—	Non-album singles	
"Bahaghari"	2022	—	—	Non-album singles	
"Langit"	2022	—	—	Non-album singles	
"Musika"	2022	28	—	Non-album singles	
"153"	2022	—	—	Non-album singles	
"Oksihina"	2023	9	4	Non-album singles	
"Hoodie" (featuring Alisson Shore)	2024	28	—	Non-album singles	
"Sining" (featuring Jay R)	2024	1	1	Non-album singles	
"Marilag"	2024	1	1	Non-album singles	
"Ikigai" (featuring Loonie)	2025	—	—	Non-album singles	
"Fall Season" (featuring Alex Bruce)	2025	—	—	Non-album singles	
"—" denotes a single that did not chart.

== Awards and nominations ==
Name of the award ceremony, year presented, award category, nominee(s) of the award, and the result of the nomination
Award	Year (Note: Indicates the year of ceremony. Each year is linked to the article about the awards held that year, wherever possible.)	Category	Recipient(s)	Result	Ref.
Awit Awards	2024	Best R&B Recording	"Oksihina"	Won	
Awit Awards	2025	Song of the Year	"Sining"	Nominated	
Awit Awards	2025	Best Collaboration	"Sining"	Won	
Awit Awards	2025	Best Performance by a Solo Artist	"Marilag"	Won	
Awit Awards	2025	Best R&B Recording	"Marilag"	Nominated	
Awit Awards	2025	Best R&B Recording	"Sining"	Won	
Awit Awards	2025	Best Pop Recording	"Hoodie"	Nominated	
Awit Awards	2026	Best Collaboration Performance	"Ikigai" (with Loonie)	Won	
Awit Awards	2026	Best Musical Arrangement	"Ikigai" (with Loonie)	Nominated	
Awit Awards	2026	Best R&B Recording	"Ikigai" (with Loonie)	Won	
Awit Awards	2026	Best Rap/Hip-hop Recording	"Ikigai" (with Loonie)	Won	
Awit Awards	2026	Best Sound Engineered Recording	"Ikigai" (with Loonie)	Nominated	
Awit Awards	2026	Best Vocal Arrangement	"Ikigai" (with Loonie)	Nominated	
Awit Awards	2026	Record of the Year	"Ikigai" (with Loonie)	Nominated	
Awit Awards	2026	Song of the Year	"Ikigai" (with Loonie)	Nominated	
Awit Awards	2026	Songwriter of the Year	Dionela	Nominated	
Awit Awards	2026	Producer of the Year	Dionela	Nominated	
Filipino Music Awards	2025	People’s Choice Awards: Song	"Marilag"	Nominated	
Filipino Music Awards	2025	Song of the Year	"Marilag"	Nominated	
Filipino Music Awards	2025	R&B Song of the Year	"Marilag"	Won	
Filipino Music Awards	2025	R&B Song of the Year	"Ikigai"	Nominated	
Filipino Music Awards	2026	Tour of the Year	The Grace Tour	Nominated	
Monster RX 93.1 Music Awards	2026	OPM Song of the Year	"Marilag"	Won	
Monster RX 93.1 Music Awards	2026	OPM Breakthrough Artist of the Year	Dionela	Won	
Monster RX 93.1 Music Awards	2026	OPM R&B Artist of the Year	Dionela	Won	
Music Awards Japan	2025	Best of Listeners' Choice: International Song	"Sining"	Nominated	
Music Awards Japan	2025	Best Song Asia	"Sining"	Nominated	
Myx Music Awards	2024	Breakout Solo Artist of the Year	Dionela	Nominated	
Myx Music Awards	2024	Collaboration of the Year	"Sining"	Nominated	
Myx Music Awards	2024	R&B Video of the Year	"Sining"	Nominated	
Myx Music Awards	2024	Song of the Year	"Sining"	Nominated	
New Hue Video Music Awards	2025	Collaboration of the Year	"Sining"	Won	
PMPC Star Awards for Music	2024	New Male Recording Artist of the Year	"Oksihina"	Won	
PMPC Star Awards for Music	2026	Song of the Year	"Marilag"	Nominated	
PMPC Star Awards for Music	2026	Music Video of the Year	"Sining"	Nominated	
PMPC Star Awards for Music	2026	Male Pop Artist of the Year	"Sining"	Nominated	
P-pop Music Awards	2024	Artist of the Year	Dionela	Nominated	
P-pop Music Awards	2024	Breakthrough Artist of the Year	Dionela	Nominated	
P-pop Music Awards	2024	Favorite Streamed Artist	Dionela	Awardee	
P-pop Music Awards	2024	Song of the Year	"Sining"	Nominated	
P-pop Music Awards	2024	Collaboration of the Year	"Sining"	Nominated	
P-pop Music Awards	2025	Artist of the Year	Dionela	Nominated	
P-pop Music Awards	2025	Song of the Year	"Marilag"	Nominated	
Wish Music Awards	2025	Wishclusive Collaboration of the Year	"Hoodie"	Nominated	
Wish Music Awards	2025	Wish R&B Song of the Year	"Sining"	Won	
Wish Music Awards	2025	Wish Breakthrough Artist of the Year	Dionela	Nominated	
Wish Music Awards	2026	Wish R&B Song of the Year	"Marilag"	Won	
Wish Music Awards	2026	Wish Song Collaboration of the Year	"Ikigai" (with Loonie)	Nominated	
Wish Music Awards	2026	Wish Artist of the Year	Dionela	Nominated	
Zeenfluential Awards	2025	Zeenfluential Music Artist	Dionela	Nominated	

== Listicles ==
Publisher	Year	Listicle	Placement	Ref.
Billboard Philippines	2024	The 50 Best Songs of 2024	Placed ("Sining")	

== Concerts and tours ==
=== Headlining tours ===
List of headlining concert tours, showing dates, associated albums, locations, and number of shows
Title	Date	Countries	Shows	Ref.
The Grace World Tour	June 6, 2025 – present	United States; Canada; Philippines	10	

=== Music festivals ===
List of music festival performances, showing dates, locations, and venues
Title	Date(s)	City	Country	Venue	Ref.
Aurora Music Festival	May 4, 2025	Angeles City/Mabalacat	Philippines	Clark Global City	
Coke Studio Live 2025	September 5, 2025	Quezon City	Philippines	Araneta Coliseum	
