= Sining (song) =

Single by Dionela ft. Jay R
- Language: English, Tagalog
- English title: Art
- Released: June 7, 2024
- Genre: R&B
- Length: 3:20
- Label: UMG Philippines
- Songwriter: Tim Dionela
- Producer: Tim Dionela

Dionela singles chronology
"Hoodie (feat. Alisson Shore)" (2024)	"Sining" (2024)	"Marilag" (2024)

Jay R singles chronology
"Ligaw" (2024)	"Sining" (2024)	"Swimmin'" (2025)

Music video
- "Sining" on YouTube

Sining (lit. 'Art') is a song written and produced by Dionela. It was released as a digital single on June 7, 2024 through UMG Philippines.

== Background and composition ==
Following the success of the single "Hoodie (feat. Alisson Shore)", Dioneila collaborated with Jay R on a standalone single released on June 7, 2024.

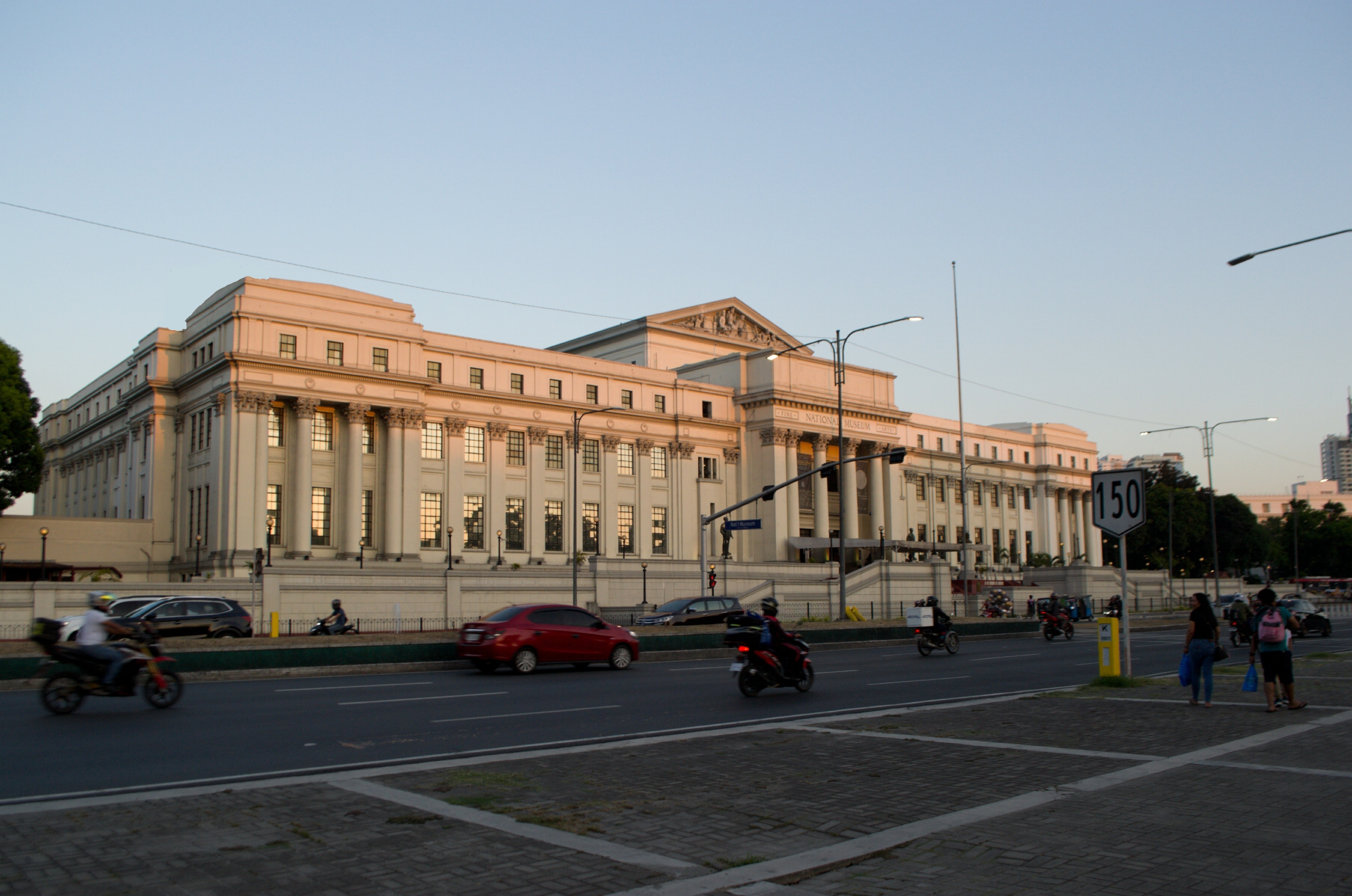
Sining was reportedly inspired by Dionela and his girlfriend's trip to the National Museum.

External videos
- TikTok video from Tim Dionela on the creation of Sining
- THE DAY THAT NATIONAL MUSEUM GAVE ME A PERFECT LOVESONG

"Sining" is a three-minute and twenty-second song composed and produced by Tim Dionela. It was described as an R&B love song that explored themes of art and love, drawing from Dionela's personal experiences to convey how his relationship has influenced his perspective.

In a TikTok video documenting the song's creation, Dionela was shown experimenting with melodies and lyrics while working through challenges to shape the track. During this process, he incorporated various instruments and sounds, leaving the second verse open for collaboration. A friend suggested reaching out to Jay R, which led to their partnership on the track and added a new layer of inspiration to the project.

== Music video ==
The music video was directed by Tristan Ortega and Raven Sta Ana and released on July 24, 2024. The video featured performances by Dionela and Jay R, alongside Stacey, a member of P-pop group Bini and Joonee Gamboa as an old man. The visual narrative complemented the song's emotional depth, blending scenes of centers around memory, loss, and love. The scenes depict the old man's daily life, marked by moments by frustration and yearning, highlighted by symbolic objects and times that represent his wife.

== Commercial performance ==
Following its release on June 7, 2024, "Sining" secured the number one spot on the Philippines Hot 100 chart for four consecutive weeks. On August 11, 2024, "Sining" made its debut on Spotify's Daily Top Songs Global chart. It also garnered over 64 million streams, bringing over 7.7 million monthly listeners, making Dionela the OPM artist with the most monthly listeners on the platform. In December 2024, the song was listed by Google as its most searched song in the Philippines for the year. It was also recognized as the Top 5 music video of 2024 on YouTube in the Philippines, and by Spotify as its Top 3 Song in the Philippines for 2024.

At the inauguration of The Official Philippines Chart on February 19, 2025, "Sining" was recognized as its top three Local Song of the Year.

In December 2025, "Sining" was recognized by Apple Music Philippines among its Top OPM Songs of the year, placing fourth.

== Charts ==
=== Weekly charts ===
Weekly chart performance for "Sining"
Chart (2024)	Peak position
Philippines (IFPI)	6
Philippines Hot 100 (Billboard Philippines)	1
Philippines Top Songs (Billboard Philippines)	1
United Arab Emirates (IFPI)	11

=== Year-end charts ===
2024 year-end chart performance for "Sining"
Chart (2024)	Position
Philippines Hot 100 (Billboard Philippines)	6
Philippines Top Songs (Billboard Philippines)	5

2025 year-end chart performance for "Sining"
Chart (2025)	Position
Philippines Hot 100 (Billboard Philippines)	12
Philippines Top Songs (Billboard Philippines)	9

== Accolades ==
Award	Year	Category	Result	Ref.
Awit Awards	2025	Song of the Year	Nominated	
Awit Awards	2025	Best Collaboration	Won	
Awit Awards	2025	Best R&B Recording	Won	
Music Awards Japan	2025	Best of Listeners' Choice: International Song	Nominated	
Music Awards Japan	2025	Best Song Asia	Nominated	
Myx Music Awards	2024	Collaboration of the Year	Nominated	
Myx Music Awards	2024	R&B Video of the Year	Nominated	
Myx Music Awards	2024	Song of the Year	Nominated	
New Hue Video Music Awards	2025	Collaboration of the Year	Won	
P-pop Music Awards	2024	Song of the Year	Nominated	
P-pop Music Awards	2024	Collaboration of the Year	Nominated	
PMPC Star Awards for Music	2026	Music Video of the Year	Nominated	
PMPC Star Awards for Music	2026	Male Pop Artist of the Year	Nominated	
Wish Music Awards	2025	Wish R&B Song of the Year	Won	

== Listicles ==
Publisher	Year	Listicle	Placement	Ref.
Billboard Philippines	2024	The 50 Best Songs of 2024	Placed	
