= Jay R (album) =

Studio album by Jay R
- Released: December 5, 2005 (Philippines)
- Recorded: 2004 – October 2005
- Genre: R&B, Pop, Hip-hop
- Length: 1:04:40
- Language: English, Tagalog
- Label: Universal
- Producer: Ray Brown (executive), Jay R Sillona (also executive), Jimmy Muna, Kris Lawrence, Big James, Riley, 3AM Music, Greg Pagani, Jason Edmonds, Michael Jeter, Eric Jackson, The Arsonist, Chaka Blackmon, Mark Qura Rankin, Vehnee Saturno, DJ MOD, Jay Durias

Jay R chronology
Gameface (2003)	Jay R (2005)	Christmas Away from Home (2006)

Singles from Jay R
- 1. "Just the Way You Are" Released: 2005; 2. "Ngayo'y Narito" Released: 2006; 3. "Hey Ma (promo only)" Released: 2006

Jay R is the self-titled second studio album by Filipino singer Jay R, released in December 2005 in the Philippines by Universal Records. To date, the album has sold more than 20,000 units in the country and has been certified gold by the Philippine Association of the Record Industry.

== Writing and recording ==
After the success of Gameface, he focused on doing a more complex R&B sound. He covered the Billy Joel original "Just the Way You Are", making a whole different arrangement, complete with street-beat rap and his distinct R&B flavor. In addition, Sillona recorded an alternate version of the song, featuring Irish pop singer, Samantha Mumba. Among other collaborators are rappers Young Clipp, Jdimes, and Sillona's bestfriends, Jimmy Muna and Kris Lawrence, who lent his vocals as back-up on the DJ MOD ballad, "Paalam".

Legendary Filipino composer Vehnee Saturno, who is responsible for Sillona's first number one hit "Bakit Pa Ba", wrote two Tagalog songs—namely "Di Ko Sadya", co-produced by South Border frontman Jay Durias, and "Ngayo'y Narito", which was released as the album's second official single.

Other songs included in the album were Sillona's commercial jingles for Colgate, Tropicana Juice Drinks and Sun Cellular.

== Singles ==
- Before the album was released, Jay R recorded theme songs for Sun Cellular ("Seasons"), Tropicana Juice Drinks ("Fill the Thirst") and Colgate ("You Make Me Smile"), which were all sent to radio and also received heavy rotation on TV, in the form of commercial advertisements. Because of popularity and his image as an effective endorser, all three songs were included in the album as bonus tracks.
- "Just the Way You Are", a cover version of Billy Joel's classic hit, was released in December 2005, alongside the album. Its arrangement was entirely revised, putting a whole R&B vibe that he delivered well. Judging the whole different sound, a critic was not impressed, saying "this is coming from a reviewer who finds even a rework of Billy Joel's "Just the Way You Are" borderline tiring (well, except the remix and duet version)." Although, the song was nominated on the Myx Music Awards 2006 for Favorite Urban Video, giving Jay R the Favorite Male Artist nomination as well. The music video focuses on Jay R singing to the song in his house with his girl, and ends showing the two shirtless in a sauna bath.
- "Ngayo'y Narito" is a Tagalog ballad written and composed by Vehnee Saturno, who also penned his number one song, "Bakit Pa Ba". It was released as the album's second commercial single. The song did not perform well as expected on charts, neither its music video, and is considered to be one of the less successful singles by the artist. The song was later used as the theme song for the drama Love & Lies.
- "Hey Ma" was sent to radio in 2006 to boost up album sales and popularity, but like the second single, it failed to make an impact to the public.

== Reception ==
Professional ratings
Review scores
Source	Rating
Titik Pilipino	4.5/5 stars

Jay R earned positive reviews from music critics and listeners. However, it failed to make a huge impact to the public, as Gameface did. Also, it received very few nominations on awarding events and did not win any category it was included in. Resty Odon of Titik Pilipino gave it four and a half out of five stars, stating that "I can't find a bad word for Jay R (the artist and the album) because he and his album are good." Although, he disliked the three overly slow Tagalog songs, saying "for those who dig them. I don't."

On the 2006 MTV Pilipinas Music Awards, the album got two nominations—Favorite Male Video for "Ngayo'y Narito", which lost to Christian Bautista's "Invincible", and Favorite Hip-Hop/R&B Video for "Just the Way You Are", which lost to "Stay Real" by Amber. On the Myx Music Awards 2006, Jay R received three nominations, on which two were for the album (Favorite Male and Favorite Urban for "Just the Way You Are"). He lost the Favorite Male Artist award to Erik Santos and the Favorite Urban Video to Gloc-9's "Tula". On the 2006 Awit Awards, the album failed to have nomination on any category. Although, he was nominated for Best Performance by a Duet on "Say That You Love Me" with Kyla, losing the award to Nina and Thor's "The Closer I Get to You". In 2007, he was nominated for R&B Artist of the Year on the Philippine Hip-Hop Awards, but was beaten by Nina on having the title.

== Track listing ==
#	Title	Featured guest(s)	Writer(s)	Producer(s)	Length
1	"Interlude Intro"		Jay R Sillona, Jimmy Muna, Kris Lawrence	Sillona, Muna, Lawrence	1:25
2	"Sexy Girl"	Young Clipp	Young Clipp, Big James, Riley	Big James, Riley	3:53
3	"Just the Way You Are"		Billy Joel	3AM Music	4:05
4	"I Got the Key"		A. Merrit, Greg Pagani	Pagani	4:11
5	"Hey Ma"		J. Omley, N. Turpin, M. Mani, Merrit	3AM Music	3:11
6	"3 AM"	Jdimes	Omley, Turpin, Mani, Merrit	3AM Music	3:15
7	"I'd Rather"		Eric Jackson	Jason Edmonds, Michael Jeter, Jackson	4:12
8	"Everything"		Jackson	Jackson, The Arsonist	3:45
9	"How Many Times"		Edmonds, Chaka Blackmon	Edmonds, Jeter, Blackmon	3:21
10	"Tonight"		Jackson	Jackson, Mark Qura Rankin	3:54
11	"Goodbye"		Big James	Jackson, Edmonds	4:32
12	"Just the Way You Are"	Samantha Mumba	Joel	3AM Music	4:02
13	"Ngayo'y Narito"		Sillona, Vehnee Saturno	Sillona, Saturno	4:45
14	"Paalam"	Kris Lawrence (background vocals)	DJ M.O.D., T. Bailey	DJ M.O.D.	4:10
15	"Di Ko Sadya"		Saturno	Sillona, Saturno, Jay Durias	4:03
16	"Seasons" (Sun Cellular theme) (bonus track)		Sillona, Muna, Lawrence	Sillona, Muna, Lawrence	2:39
17	"Fill the Thirst" (Tropicana theme) (bonus track)		Sillona, Muna, Lawrence	Sillona, Muna, Lawrence	2:24
18	"You Make Me Smile" (Colgate theme) (bonus track)	Jimmy Muna	Sillona, Muna, Lawrence	Sillona, Muna, Lawrence	2:45

== Personnel ==
- 3AM Music – producer
- The Arsonist – producer
- Big James – producer, A&R director
- Chaka Blackmon – producer
- Ray Brown – executive producer
- Adrian J. Cabel – album concept and design
- Claudio Cueni – mixing
- DJ M.O.D. – producer, arranger
- Jay Durias – producer
- Jason Edmonds – producer
- Bill Dooley – mastering
- Eric Jackson – producer
- Dominique James – photography
- Michael Jeter – producer
- Kris Lawrence – producer
- Angelo Macanaya – publisher
- Dennis Macanaya – additional keyboards
- Jimmy Muna – back-up vocals, producer
- Greg Pagani – producer
- Mark Qura Rankin – producer
- Riley – producer
- Elmir Saison – additional keyboards
- Vehnee A. Saturno – producer
- Jay R Sillona – lead vocals, back-up vocals, executive producer, producer, vocal arranger

Recording locations

- Kut5 Studio – recording and mastering (track 14)
- Paramount Mastering Santa Monica, California – mastering

== Certifications ==
Country	Provider	Certification	Sales
Philippines	PARI	Gold	20,000+
