= Jay R =

Filipino singer (born 1981)

- Born: Gaudencio Sillona III (Note: Jay R is a United States citizen. Thus, he does not possess his mother's maiden name (Aquino) as is the convention in the Philippines.); February 1, 1981 (age 45); Glendale, California, U.S.
- Genres: R&B; soul; pop
- Occupations: Singer; songwriter; actor
- Years active: 1997–present
- Labels: Universal; Homeworkz
- Spouse: Mica Javier (m. 2020)
- Website: jayrsmusic.com

Gaudencio Sillona III (born February 1, 1981), professionally known as Jay R, (Note: Jay R explained why he used "Jay R": "I'm Gaudencio III, a junior. That's why I use the name Jay-R." on a TV show, accessed on www.philstar.com) is a Filipino-American singer and actor. His debut album, Gameface, was released in 2003 under Universal Records. It was certified platinum by the Philippine Association of the Record Industry (PARI) and included the single "Bakit Pa Ba".

== Early life ==
Sillona's father, Gaudencio Sillona Jr., was a pianist, and his mother, Amparo Aquino-Sillona, was a singer. From 2004, his career was managed by his aunt, choreographer Geleen Eugenio. Sillona speaks fluent Tagalog and cites Stevie Wonder, Luther Vandross, and Gary Valenciano as musical influences during his youth.

== Music career ==
=== 2003–2005: Gameface and self-titled album ===
In 2003, Sillona signed a contract with Universal Records and released his debut album Gameface, which included two Tagalog songs — "Kaibigan" and "Bakit Pa Ba". The music video for his first single, "Design for Luv", an R&B, hip-hop track, was filmed in Hollywood with Ray Brown.

Gameface was re-released in 2004 with two additional songs, later used as singles. The album was both commercially and critically successful, earning platinum certification by the Philippine Association of the Record Industry. It was also nominated for multiple awards and won Sillona the Favorite Male Artist award at the 2004 MTV Pilipinas Music Awards and "Best Ballad" at the Awit Awards for "Bakit Pa Ba". In April 2004, he headlined his first solo concert, Gameface the Concert, at the Music Museum, followed by Gameface Reload in September 2004.

Following the success of his debut, Sillona released self-titled Jay R, his second album, which introduced a more R&B-oriented sound. It included a cover of Billy Joel's "Just the Way You Are" and an alternate version featuring Irish pop singer Samantha Mumba. The album also featured collaborations with rappers Young Clipp, Jdimes, and longtime collaborators Jimmy Muna and Kris Lawrence. The album received positive reviews, including praise from Titik Pilipino, and achieved a gold certification from PARI.

In 2004, Sillona collaborated with Filipino singer Kyla on the single "Not Your Ordinary Girl" from her album of the same name. The two later released additional duets, including "Back in Time", "Say That You Love Me", "You Are Not Alone", and "Undeniable". That year, he made his film debut in Happy Together and released his second studio album, a self-titled work, in 2005.

In 2005, Sillona appeared in Footloose: The Musical, alongside Iya Villania. He contributed as a featured artist, songwriter, and producer on Karylle's album, You Make Me Sing.

=== 2006–2009: Homeworkz Records ===
In 2006, Sillona built Homeworkz, a recording studio in his home, and established his label, initially named JAYRS Music. He described the studio as a cost-efficient and convenient space for recording, which he designed to resemble a modern bachelor pad.

Early in 2008, Sillona released Soul in Love, a cover album, featuring R&B and jazz classics that influenced him. The album was well-received, achieving gold certification in the Philippines and later earning platinum status. The album won him the R&B Artist of the Year award at the 2008 Philippine Hip-Hop Awards and a nomination for Best Male Soul/R&B Artist at the inaugural Wave 89.1 Urban Music Awards in 2009. To support the album, Sillona performed in Japan and collaborated with artists including Iya Villania, Kris Aquino, Kris Lawrence, and Billy Crawford.

=== 2010–2012: Jay R Sings OPM Love Classics and international exposure ===
In early 2010, Sillona released Jay R Sings OPM Love Classics, an all-Tagalog cover album. The album features 13 songs recorded by prominent OPM artists in the 1980s and 1990s. Inquirer Entertainment commended the album for Sillona's vocal ability, stating that his voice "practically breezes through most of the ballads".

He appeared as a performer on GMA Network's musical variety show Party Pilipinas and served as the host of the Philippine adaptation of the dating game show Take Me Out.

On September 2, 2010, Sillona signed a three-year contract with Tarra Group Indonesia in Jakarta. As part of this contract, Sillona collaborated with Indonesian pop artist Drimi on "Kau Dan Aku".

=== 2014: Elevated album ===
Sillona released his album Elevated in 2014, under his label Homeworkz. The single "Tonight", featuring Mica Javier, rose to the top of the radio charts at No. 1 and was awarded Best R&B Song of the Year by Wave 89.1 FM and 93.1 Monster FM. The album was awarded gold status by PARI during the ABS-CBN TV show ASAP on Channel 2.

In 2014, after over a decade with GMA Network, Sillona transferred to ABS-CBN. He debuted on the network as a contestant on the impersonation competition Your Face Sounds Familiar, marking his first appearance on a reality show.

In 2016, Sillona was announced as a member of the R&B group ASAP Soul Sessions, along with Jason Dy, Daryl Ong, KZ Tandingan and Kyla. The group formed on May 15, 2016, and disbanded in late 2017.

=== 2017–present: Kamusta Ka album ===
In late 2017, Homeworkz launched a teaser single entitled "Kabilang Dako" written by Thyro and Jay R. The song won R&B Song of the Year at the Wave 89.1 FM and Wish FM Awards.

In 2018, Sillona signed with Cornerstone Entertainment.

== Acting career ==
In 2004, Sillona appeared in a recurring role on GMA-7's drama series Narito ang Puso Ko. It was followed by a main role in an episode of Love to Love entitled "Duet for Love", where he starred opposite Toni Gonzaga. In December 2004, he made his film debut, a minor role in Regal Films' entry for the year's Metro Manila Film Festival, So Happy Together.

In 2005, he was cast in another episode of Love to Love, entitled "Haunted Lovehouse". He later starred in a feature film, Hari ng Sablay, released on November 30, 2005. Before the year ended, he played the antagonist role of Haring Bagulbol on Exodus: Tales from the Enchanted Kingdom. The film was Regal's entry for the 2005 Metro Manila Film Festival.

In 2006, Sillona took a recurring role on Encantadia: Pag-ibig Hanggang Wakas. He portrayed Azulan, a leader of the Bahaghari, who fancies Sang'gre Amihan (Iza Calzado). On January 1, 2008, he starred in another Metro Manila Film Festival entry entitled Desperados. In October of the same year, he portrayed Pato, a recurring role in the Filipino adaptation of LaLola. Before 2008 ended, Desperados was followed by its sequel, rushed as Regal's entry at the 2008 Metro Manila Film Festival. In 2009, he played Vince, a lead role in Dear Friend's episode, "The Three Bachelors", which featured his opposite longtime music partner Kyla.

== Other ventures ==
In February 2007, Sillona launched a club at Glorietta, called Rock Candy. However, it was destroyed during the 2007 Glorietta Explosion in October 2007. After the disaster, instead of reconstructing his club, he invested in a Ministop outlet at Wilson Street in Greenhills Shopping Center. He stated in an interview that Katya Santos was the one who recommended investing in this kind of business.

Sillona has done commercials and theme songs for products like Sun Cellular, Tropicana, and Colgate. He is also a commercial model for Bench Body, Atlas Shippers International, Techno Marine, Unisilver, Adidas, Skechers, and Calayan Surgicenter.

== Personal life ==
On March 1, 2020, Sillona married model and singer-actress Mica Javier in an outdoor ceremony at the Lind in Boracay, Malay, Aklan.

== Discography ==
- Gameface (2003)
- Jay R (2005)
- Christmas Away from Home (2006)
- Soul in Love (2008)
- Jay R Sings OPM Love Classics (2010)
- Elevated (2014)
- Kamusta Ka (2018)
- Pangako with CLR (2020)
- Seryoso (2020)
- Undeniable with Kyla (2020)

== Filmography ==
=== Film ===
Year	Film	Role
2004	Happy Together	Brent
2005	Hari ng Sablay	Adonis
2005	Exodus: Tales from the Enchanted Kingdom	Haring Bagulbol
2007	Desperadas	Vito
2008	Desperadas 2	Vito
2015	Beauty and the Bestie	Himself
2025	Songs for Selina	Nick

=== Television ===
Year	Title	Role	Notes
2003–2010	SOP	Himself	2003/2010
2004	MYX shows	Himself	Celebrity VJ (March 2004, December 2005, April 2010)
2004	Narito ang Puso Ko	Himself	Recurring role
2004	Love to Love	Marvin	Episode "Duet for Love"
2005	Love to Love	Bogart	Episode "Haunted Lovehouse"
2006	Encantadia: Pag-ibig Hanggang Wakas	Azulan	Recurring Role
2008–2009	LaLola	Pato	Recurring role (2008/2009)
2009	Dear Friend	Vince Gonzales	Episode "The Three Bachelors"
2010	Party Pilipinas	Himself	2010/2013
2010	Take Me Out	Himself	Host
2010	Channel V Philippines shows	Himself	V.I.P. Artist (May 2010)
2011	Magic Palayok	Nico	Recurring role
2011	Time of My Life	Michael	Guest
2013	Sunday All Stars	Himself	2013/2015
2015	It's Showtime	Himself	Guest Hurado
2015–present	ASAP	Himself/Performer	1st Regular Show On ABS-CBN
2015	Your Face Sounds Familiar 1	Himself, Contestant-Performer	3rd placer
2015	It's Showtime	Himself	Guest Hurado / Contestant on "Ansabe?"/ Guest Performer
2016	We Love OPM	Himself/Mentor	Team Hot Spots
2020	SNL	Himself/Artist	
2020	ASAP Natin 'To	Himself/Artist	

== Awards and nominations ==
Year	Award giving body	Category	Nominated work	Results	Ref.
2004	Aliw Awards	Most Promising Male Entertainer	Jay R (himself)	Won	
2004	Awit Awards	Song of the Year	"Bakit Pa Ba"	Nominated	
2004	Awit Awards	Best Ballad	"Bakit Pa Ba"	Won	
2004	Awit Awards	Music Video of the Year	"Bakit Pa Ba"	Nominated	
2004	MTV Pilipinas Music Awards	Favorite Male Video	"Bakit Pa Ba"	Won	
2004	MTV Pilipinas Music Awards	Favorite New Artist in a Video	"Bakit Pa Ba"	Nominated	
2005	Aliw Awards	Best Male Major Concert	Gameface Reload	Nominated	
2005	Philippine Hip-Hop Music Awards	Male R&B Artist of the Year	Jay R (himself)	Nominated	
2005	Philippine Hip-Hop Music Awards	R&B Video of the Year	"Bakit Pa Ba"	Nominated	
2006	Awit Awards	Best Performance by a Duet	"Say That You Love Me" (Jay R and Kyla)	Nominated	
2006	Awit Awards	Best R&B	"You Make Me Sing" (Karylle; co-produced by Jay R)	Nominated	
2006	MYX Music Awards	Favorite Male Artist	Jay R (himself)	Nominated	
2006	MYX Music Awards	Favorite Collaboration	"Say That You Love Me" (Jay R and Kyla)	Nominated	
2006	MYX Music Awards	Favorite Urban Video	"Just the Way You Are"	Nominated	
2007	Philippine Hip-Hop Music Awards	R&B Artist of the Year	Jay R (himself)	Nominated	
2008	ASAP 24K Awards	Gold Record Award	Soul in Love	Won	
2008	Philippine Hip-Hop Music Awards	R&B Artist of the Year	Jay R (himself)	Won	
2009	ASAP Platinum Circle Awards	Platinum Circle Award for Certifying Platinum	Soul in Love	Won	
2009	Awit Awards	Best Performance by a Duet	"Back in Time" (Kyla and Jay R)	Nominated	
2009	PMPC Star Awards for Music	R&B Album of the Year	Soul in Love	Nominated	
2009	PMPC Star Awards for Music	R&B Artist of the Year	Jay R (himself)	Nominated	
2009	RX 93.1	OPM Song of the Year	"Back in Time" (Kyla and Jay R)	Won	
2009	Wave 89.1 Urban Music Awards	Best Male Soul/R&B Artist	Jay R (himself)	Nominated	
2009	Wave 89.1 Urban Music Awards	Best Remake	"Tattooed on My Mind" (with D'Sound)	Nominated	
2009	Wave 89.1 Urban Music Awards	Best Collaboration	"Back in Time" (Kyla and Jay R)	Won	
2009	Wave 89.1 Urban Music Awards	Male Style Icon Award	Jay R (himself)	Nominated	
2010	MYX Music Awards	Favorite Song	"Back in Time" (Kyla and Jay R)	Won	
2010	MYX Music Awards	Favorite Collaboration	"Back in Time" (Kyla and Jay R)	Nominated	
2010	PMPC Star Awards for Music	R&B Artist of the Year	Jay R (himself)	Won	
2010	Wave 89.1 Urban Music Awards	Best Male Soul/R&B Artist	Jay R (himself)	Nominated	
2010	Wave 89.1 Urban Music Awards	Male Style Icon Award	Jay R (himself)	Nominated	
2011	Awit Awards	Best Collaboration	"Muli" (Jay R and Nina)	Nominated	
2011	Awit Awards	Album of the Year	Jay R Sings OPM Love Classics	Nominated	
2011	MYX Music Awards	Favorite Remake	"Himala"	Nominated	
2018	Wish Music Awards	Wishclusive R&B Performance of the Year	"Kabilang Dako"	Nominated	
2025	New Hue Video Music Awards	Collaboration of the Year	"Sining" (Dionela featuring Jay R)	Won	

== See also ==
- ALV Talent Circuit
