= Give Love on Christmas Day =

Song performed by The Jackson 5

Song by The Jackson 5

from the album Jackson 5 Christmas Album
- Genre: R&B, Christmas
- Length: 2:44
- Label: Motown
- Songwriters: Berry Gordy Jr.; Fonce Mizell; Freddie Perren; Deke Richards; Christine Perren
- Producer: The Corporation

Music video
- "Give Love on Christmas Day" on YouTube

"Give Love on Christmas Day" is a Christmas song first recorded in 1970 by Motown's Jackson 5. Written by the label's songwriting-producing team, The Corporation (Berry Gordy, Alphonzo Mizell, Christine Perren, Freddie Perren and Deke Richards), the song was recorded for the Jackson 5 Christmas Album. The song was well received critically upon release of the album. The festive track went on to be covered by groups such as The Temptations, New Edition, and BlackGirl, and by solo artists such as Yolanda Adams, Ledisi, Coko (and her group SWV), and Johnny Gill.

== Production ==
"Give Love on Christmas Day" was written by the Motown Records' producing-writing team known as "The Corporation". The Jacksons' hit singles such as "I Want You Back", "ABC" and "The Love You Save" had been written by the Motown team months earlier, and had aided the five brothers in becoming the first black teen idols. The festive track was included on The Jackson 5 Christmas Album, released in 1970. Other songs on the album included "Have Yourself a Merry Little Christmas", "Up on the Housetop", "Frosty the Snowman", "The Christmas Song", "Rudolph the Red-Nosed Reindeer" and "Christmas Won't Be the Same This Year".

== Release and reception ==
In 1986, the song gained release as a CD single in the United States, in order to promote the release of the first CD version of The Jackson 5 Christmas Album.

In a review of Jackson 5 Christmas Album, Lynn Norment of Ebony magazine described the then 12-year-old Michael Jackson's vocals on the track—along with the songs "The Little Drummer Boy", "Santa Claus Is Coming to Town" and "I Saw Mommy Kissing Santa Claus"—as sounding "angelic". Billboard, also reviewing the quintet's seasonal album, stated that "Give Love On Christmas Day", as well as the song "Someday at Christmas", were both "potent numbers".

== Cover versions ==
- New Edition (1985) – from the EP Christmas All Over the World
- Sarah Geronimo (2009) – for her album Your Christmas Girl
- Daniel Padilla and Kathryn Bernardo (2015) – produced by Star Music
