= Gameface =

Album by Jay R Sillona

Studio album by Jay R
- Released: August 4, 2003
- Recorded: 2002‒July 2003
- Genre: R&B, pop
- Length: 55:40
- Language: English, Tagalog
- Label: Universal
- Producer: Ray Brown (executive), Troy Johnson (executive), Bella Dy Tan (executive), Jay R Sillona, Jean Bellefeuille, Ian Boxill, Shawn Dark, Bryson Evans, Jimmy Martinez, RedOne, The Triangle, Vehnee Saturno, DJ M.O.D.

Jay R chronology
Gameface (2003)	Jay R (2005)

Singles from Gameface
- 1. "Design for Luv" Released: July 2003; 2. "Bakit Pa Ba" Released: December 2003

Repackaged edition cover
- Gameface (Repackaged)

Singles from Gameface (Repackaged)
- 1. "Kung Mahal Mo Siya" Released: 2004; 2. "Throw Your Hands in the Air (Remix) (featuring Krook & JOLO)" Released: 2004

Gameface is the debut studio album by Filipino pop/R&B singer Jay R, released in the Philippines in August 2003 by Universal Records. He produced the album together with Ray Brown and Troy Johnson, in partnership with NuLife and his record label. To date, the album has reached Platinum status by the Philippine Association of the Record Industry (PARI), denoting over 30,000 units sold in the country.

The album was made available on digital download through iTunes and Amazon.com on January 23, 2007.

== Background ==
At the age of sixteen, Jay R was already a member of a group called FI (First Impression). The group consisted of five members, including Jimmy Martinez (who came to Manila with Jay R and is now popularly known as Jimmy Muna). When the other members left the group, he and Muna replaced them with Kris Cadevida (later known as Kris Lawrence after winning ABS-CBN singing show Search for the Star in a Million). They did gigs in Los Angeles, San Francisco, and Michigan. He, also, became the lead singer with his sister Jhing of another band that was led by his late uncle, Robert Sillona, called The Howlers. Later, his sister Jhing would collaborate with him in creating songs. He started performing gigs all around Southern California. He also did back-up vocals for major artists, whose albums were released in the United States, Latin America, Philippines and other territories. Later, he started co-writing songs with these international artists. He has collaborated with Ray Brown, Troy Johnson, Jason Edmonds, 3am, Steve Singer, Gary Brown, Triangle Productions, Dutch Cousin, Chuck Cymone and many other talented producers, even before he got the record deal with Universal.

== Singles ==
- Gameface was released in August 2003, accompanied by Jay R's debut single, "Design for Luv". The song contains an R&B, hip hop vibe, which was rare for OPM songs at that time. It received heavy airplay, but did not perform well enough to be a breakthrough hit. The song's music video was shot on Hollywood, Los Angeles, California. It is almost plotless and just shows scenes of Jay R singing to the song, while sexy girls are dancing around him. JD Jr. is featured on the song's video.
- Following the first single, he released a Tagalog ballad penned by Vehnee Saturno, entitled "Bakit Pa Ba". It became the biggest hit from the album. The music video is dark and has a sad feel. It depicts Jay R singing to the song for his love interest. Immediately after the success of the single, the album was certified Gold by the PARI.
- In 2004, the album was re-released, containing two new tracks, "Kung Mahal Mo Siya" and "Throw Your Hands in the Air" (Remix)—both of which were used as singles. "Kung Mahal Mo Siya" was also written by Saturno, and was the third single from the album. It is an OPM ballad that has a similar composition to "Bakit Pa Ba", although it didn't have the same impact as "Bakit Pa Ba" did.
- "Throw Your Hands in the Air", the original version, was released as the album's fourth and final single. The song slightly differs from the remix version (which was included on the repackaged album), and also features Krook and JOLO.

== Promotion ==
As a debut artist, Jay R did several concerts and performances to promote his album. In April 2004, he accomplished his first ever three-night solo major concert which was entitled Gameface the Concert at the Music Museum. The concert showcased his vocal rhythm and harmony, performing with Mystreme band, and singing the most wanted hits of different genres. It was staged by popular concert director Louie Ignacio and Mon Faustino. The first concert was so successful, it was immediately followed by another one, entitled Gameface Reload, held at the Folk Arts Theater on September 25, 2004. The second concert featured special guests with big names in the industry, including Regine Velasquez, Ai Ai de las Alas, Kyla and Sandara Park.

== Reception ==
Gameface has proven Jay R as a breakthrough artist. It received positive reviews, both from music critics and listeners. It also performed well commercially, certifying Platinum by the PARI to date. Furthermore, it is one of the albums from the early 2000s that have brought back heavy R&B-hip hop to the OPM music scene. It has influenced current Filipino male R&B acts like Kris Lawrence and Duncan Ramos. In addition, he was compared to Gary Valenciano, described in terms of his vocal performance on the album. On September 9, 2004, the 17th Awit Awards was held, wherein he was nominated for three categories (Best Ballad, Song of the Year and Music Video of the Year). He won Best Ballad song, but lost the Song of the Year and Music Video of the Year awards to Parokya ni Edgar's "Mr. Suave". On the same year, he received two nominations on the MTV Pilipinas Music Awards (Favorite Male and Favorite New Artist) —where he won Favorite Male, but lost the other award to Bamboo. He was also named as the Most Promising Male Performer of the year 2004 by Aliw Awards.

Awards and nominations

- Awit Award for Best Ballad ("Bakit Pa Ba") - won
- Awit Award for Song of the Year ("Bakit Pa Ba") - awarded to "Mr. Suave" by Parokya ni Edgar
- Awit Award for Music Video of the Year ("Bakit Pa Ba") - awarded to "Mr. Suave" by Parokya ni Edgar
- Aliw Award for Most Promising Male Performer - won
- MTV Pilipinas for Favorite Male Video ("Bakit Pa Ba") - won
- MTV Pilipinas for Favorite New Artist in a Video ("Bakit Pa Ba") - awarded to Bamboo
- Philippine Hip-Hop Award for Male R&B Artist of the Year - awarded to Luke Mejares
- Philippine Hip-Hop Award for R&B Video of the Year ("Bakit Pa Ba") - awarded to "The Show" by South Border

== Track listing ==
1. "Design for Luv" (rap part by JD) (Jay R Sillona, Troy Johnson, Allen Sovory, Michael Nielsen, Ralph Churchwell IV) – 3:43
2. "Where Do We Go" (Sillona, Johnson, Sovory, Nielsen, Churchwell, A. Bacani, M. Gabriel, O. Maurao, Jimmy Martinez) – 3:39
3. "All I Need" (Shawn Dark, RedOne) – 3:43
4. "I Got a Girl" (Ian Boxill, Jean Bellefeuille, A. Merrit) – 3:41
5. "Farewell" (Johnson, K. Ratliff) – 3:41
6. "Rivers Running" (Johnson, S. Young) – 3:43
7. "Gameface" (rap part by Beeno) (Johnson, Young, A. Tanner) – 3:41
8. "Tongue Ring" (Johnson, A. Cantrell, D. Sharp) – 3:01
9. "My Bestfriend's Girl" (Sillona, Johnson, Martinez) – 3:54
10. "Our Love" (Sovory, Nielsen, Churchwell) – 5:07
11. "Kaibigan" (Jhing Sillona, Johnson) – 5:01
12. "Bakit Pa Ba" (Vehnee Saturno) – 4:45

=== Repackaged bonus tracks ===
Gameface was re-issued in 2004 with two new tracks that were used as the album's final commercial singles.

1. "Throw Your Hands in the Air" (Remix) (featuring Krook & JOLO) (Krook & JOLO, DJ M.O.D.) – 3:41
2. "Kung Mahal Mo Siya" (Saturno) – 4:13

== Personnel ==
- Jean Bellefeuille – producer
- Rico Bicol – digital mastering
- Elmer Blancaflor – arranger
- Ian Boxill – producer
- Ray Brown – executive producer
- Shawn Dark – producer
- DJ M.O.D. – producer, arranger
- Bryson Evans – producer
- Dominique James – photography
- Troy Johnson – executive producer, producer, mixing and mastering
- Jimmy Martinez – producer
- RedOne – producer
- Efren San Pedro – mixing engineer
- Vehnee Saturno – producer, mastering engineer
- Jay R Sillona – lead vocals, back-up vocals, producer
- Bon Sundiang – art direction, cover design
- Bella Dy Tan – executive producer
- The Triangle – producer

Recording locations

  - Saturno Music Production (Quezon City, Philippines) – recording (tracks 12, 14)
  - Natures Finest Soundlab – mixing and mastering

== Certifications ==
Country	Provider	Certification	Sales
Philippines	PARI	Platinum	30,000+

== Release history ==
Country	Release date	Format
Philippines	August 2003	Standard (CD)
Philippines	2004	Repackaged (CD + bonus tracks)
United States	January 23, 2007	Standard (digital download)
