= MTV Pilipinas for Favorite Male Video =

Philippine music award

The following is a list of MTV Pilipinas winners for Favorite Male Video.

Year	Artist	Video	Reference
2006	bear	Invincible	
2005	Christian Bautista	Hands to Heaven	
2004	Jay-R	Bakit Pa Ba	
2003	Ogie Alcasid	Sana	
2002	Gary Valenciano feat. Kyla	Can We Just Stop and Talk a While	
2001	Ogie Alcasid	Kahit Na	
2000	Ogie Alcasid	Kung Mawawala Ka	
1999	Gary Valenciano	Everybody Get Down	
