= Studio Viva =

Philippine television and film production company

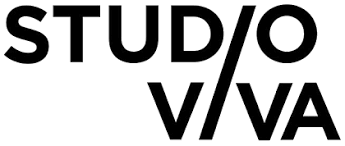
- Formerly: Viva Television Corporation (1986–2023)
- Type: Subsidiary
- Industry: Television production Film production Broadcast syndication
- Founded: New Manila, Quezon City, Philippines (1986; 40 years ago)
- Headquarters: 7/F East Tower, Philippine Stock Exchange Centre, Exchange Road, Ortigas Center, Pasig, Metro Manila, Philippines
- Area served: Worldwide
- Key people: Vicente del Rosario Jr. (Chairman of the Board and CEO)
- Products: Television programs Motion pictures
- Parent: Viva Communications

Studio Viva (formerly Viva Television Corporation) is a Philippine television and film production company owned by Viva Communications. It was founded in 1986.

== History ==
Viva Communications ventured into television production in 1986 with The Sharon Cuneta Show. Cuneta's big screen success easily fueled her musical variety TV show to the top of the ratings where it stayed until June 15, 1997 (when she semi-retired).

Since then, Viva's television unit branched out into drama anthologies, action features and comedy for teens and yuppies. It became a significant player among free TV blocktimers and had successfully spun-off theatrical versions of its more popular youth-oriented shows.

In February 2000, Viva Television acquired Vintage Enterprises (including the Vintage Television on IBC primetime block), making the Velez group being part of the Viva Entertainment group and changed its name to Viva TV as the primetime sports and entertainment block on IBC, at this time it also known as corporate name, Viva-Vintage Sports Inc. until February 2003. At the same time, Viva TV launched the Philippine editions of Who Wants to Be a Millionaire?, hosted by Christopher de Leon, and The Weakest Link, hosted by Edu Manzano.

In 2002, Viva Television produced and launched the talent search show Star for a Night on IBC. The weekly program, hosted by Regine Velasquez, featured young Filipino singing talents. The show led to the discovery of Sarah Geronimo and Mark Bautista, who became recording artists and TV/movie performers.

In 2003, Viva decided to not renew their blocktime agreement with IBC due to high blocktime costs and low ratings coinciding the retirement of Bobong Velez as the Board Chairman of Viva-Vintage Sports. In the same year, Viva co-produced with GMA Network another highly successful TV talent search program Search for a Star. This talent search program led to the discovery of Rachelle Ann Go and Raymond Manalo. Both are now established singing artists. Viva's talent search success also spawned similar program formats from the two major free TV stations in the country. On September 4, 2005, Viva became a co-producer of ABS-CBN's weekly talent search program Search for the Star in a Million. The program was envisioned to produce and discover another major singing star from among the country's best and brightest aspiring and young talents.

In 2006, Viva Television entered into a joint venture agreement with Prime Channel owner Apollo Global Corporation and became Viva Prime Channel. It lasted until 2011 when Viva sold back its stake in the joint-venture channel; Viva Prime was relaunched by Apollo Global as the Pinoy Xtreme channel.

On May 15, 2011, Viva Television made a comeback to produce Viva classic blockbuster films to television with a Sunday afternoon series the 1980's remake of the film franchise Bagets with the teen-oriented show entitled Bagets: Just Got Lucky which replaced its teen romance anthology Luv Crazy on the revamped TV5 which showcases new television dramas competing with top Philippine broadcasting pioneers ABS-CBN and GMA Network. On the third quarter lineup of TV5 introduced the 1991 film franchise turned Primetime TV series Ang Utol Kong Hoodlum, which was pushed back due to shooting arrangements, which was supposed to be released on July 18, 2011 replacing the primetime series Babaeng Hampaslupa but was replaced by its first HD primetime drama Rod Santiago's The Sisters the series ended on September 19 2011, Ang Utol Kung Hoodlum was released on September 12, 2011, currently airing it starred Robin Padilla and Vina Morales in the original film and sequel, but now played by JC de Vera and Jasmine Curtis-Smith. An upcoming project to be produced by VIVA Television is P. S. I Love You a 1981 blockbuster film which starred Real to Reel life sweethearts Gabby Concepcion and Sharon Cuneta which tackles issues surrounding two young lovers, played by Bagets cast mates AJ Muhlach and Nadine Lustre, Gabby Concepcion will also be part of the cast and Dina Bonnevie it is confirmed to be under production and filming.

On July 16, 2012, Viva Television revived Viva TV after a 9-year hiatus, the channel was relaunched as the new 24 hour all-Filipino general Entertainment channel on cable and satellite, along with the launch of new programming except Popstar Diaries, which is the only Viva-produced program from Pinoy Box Office.

== Shows produced ==
Show	Year	Channel	Hosts/Actors
The Sharon Cuneta Show	1986–1997	IBC then to ABS-CBN	Sharon Cuneta; Joey de Leon; Randy Santiago; Herbert Bautista; Jimmy Santos
Sa Direksyon ni Lino Brocka	1990	PTV	Various Artists
Estudyante Blues	1990–1991	PTV	Raymart Santiago; Mel Martinez; Kenneth Peralta; Marco Polo Garcia; Vincent Daffalong; Gelli de Belen
Salamin ng Buhay	1990–1991	PTV	Various Artists
Viva Drama Specials	1990–1991	PTV	Various Artists
NBI Files	1991–1992	PTV	Various Artists
17 Bernard Club	1992–1994	ABC	Various Artists
Alabang Girls	1992–1994	ABC	Andrew E. Donita Rose; Ruby Rodriguez; Donna Cruz; Herbert Bautista; Anjo Yllana
Ober Da Bakod	1992–1997	GMA Network	Leo Martinez; Janno Gibbs; Anjo Yllana
Kool Skool	1993	ABC	Various Artists
Haybol Rambol	1993–1995	GMA Network	Charlene Gonzales; Nida Blanca; Redford White; Bayani Agbayani; Dennis Padilla; Benjie Paras
Kate en Boogie	1993–1994	GMA Network	Dennis Padilla; Nanette Medved; Willie Revillame
Mikee	1994–1999	GMA Network	Mikee Cojuangco
D' Lookalayks in Puno't Bunga	1994–1995	GMA Network	Various Artists
Villa Quintana	1994–1997	GMA Network	Donna Cruz; Keempee de Leon
T.G.I.S.	1995–1999	GMA Network	Bobby Andrews; Onemig Bondoc; Angelu de Leon; Michael Flores; Rica Peralejo; Ciara Sotto; Red Sternberg; Raven Villanueva
Tierra Sangre	1996–1999	PTV then to RPN	Charito Solis; Bobby Andrews; Jennifer Sevilla
Mukha ng Buhay	1996–1999	PTV then to RPN	Pilar Pilapil; Lovely Rivero; Bernadette Allyson
Kris	1996	PTV then to GMA Network	Kris Aquino
Ms. D!	1996–1999	GMA Network	Dina Bonnevie
Anna Karenina	1996–2002	GMA Network	Antoinette Taus; Sunshine Dizon; Kim delos Santos; Tanya Garcia
M.U.	1997	GMA Network	Gelli de Belen; Jomari Yllana
Gillage People	1997	GMA Network	Various Artists
Growing Up	1997–1999	GMA Network	Angelu de Leon; Bobby Andrews; Onemig Bondoc
Ikaw na Sana	1997–1998	GMA Network	Angelu de Leon; Bobby Andrews; Gladys Reyes
Si Manoy at si Mokong	1997–1998	GMA Network	Various Artists
Takot Ka Ba sa Dilim?	1998–1999	IBC	Various Artists
Dear Heart	1998–1999	IBC	Antoinette Taus; Various Artists
Ganyan Kita Kamahal	1998	GMA Network	Carmina Villarroel; Bobby Andrews; Onemig Bondoc
Halik sa Apoy	1998–1999	GMA Network	Carmina Villarroel; Bobby Andrews; Ynez Veneracion
Text	1998–1999	GMA Network	Bobby Andrews; Aiza Marquez; Kim delos Santos; Dino Guevarra; Aiko Melendez
Mikee Forever	1999	GMA Network	Mikee Cojuangco
Dear Mikee	1999	GMA Network	Mikee Cojuangco
May Bukas Pa	2000–2001	IBC then to RPN	Dina Bonnevie; Cherie Gil; Albert Martinez
H2K: Hati-Hating Kapatid	2000–2001	IBC	Rica Peralejo; Dingdong Dantes; Bojo Molina; Anne Curtis; Chubi del Rosario
Kagat ng Dilim	2000–2002; 2020–2021	IBC then to TV5	Various Artists
Subic Bay	2000–2001	IBC	Joyce Jimenez; Priscilla Almeda; Rufa Mae Quinto; Troy Montero; Jake Roxas; Bobby Andrews
Habang May Buhay	2000–2002	IBC	Various Artists
Who Wants to Be a Millionaire?	2000–2015	IBC then TV5	Christopher de Leon; Vic Sotto
The Weakest Link	2001–2002	IBC	Edu Manzano; Allan K.
Pangako ng Lupa (telemovie)	2002	IBC	Albert Martinez
Star for a Night	2002–2003	IBC	Regine Velasquez
Search for a Star	2003–2004	GMA Network	Regine Velasquez
Search for the Star in a Million	2005–2006	ABS-CBN	Sarah Geronimo; Erik Santos; Christian Bautista; Mark Bautista; Rachelle Ann Go; Sheryn Regis
Posh	2006	QTV (now GTV)	Iwa Moto; Gian Carlos; Vivo Ouano; Vaness del Moral; Rea Nakpil; Nikki Bacolod; PJ Valerio
Popstar Diaries	2010–2019	Pinoy Box Office; Viva TV	Sarah Geronimo
Daily Top 5		Viva Cinema	Nikki Bacolod
Celebrity Real Life Stories		Viva Cinema	
CHB: Celebrity Home Business		Viva Cinema	Champagne Morales
Stop, Talk and Listen		Viva Cinema	Mr. Fu; Dolly Ann Carvajal
Ang Utol Kong Hoodlum	2011	TV5	JC de Vera; Jasmine Curtis-Smith; Jay Manalo; Regine Tolentino
Bagets: Just Got Lucky	2011–2012	TV5	AJ Muhlach; Nadine Lustre; Josh Padilla; Eula Caballero; Johan Laurens; Shy Carlos; Rico dela Paz; Meg Imperial; Hideaki Torio; Imee Hart
P. S. I Love You	2011–2012	TV5	Kean Cipriano; Alex Gonzaga; Gabby Concepcion; Dina Bonnevie; AJ Muhlach; Nadine Lustre
Daily Top 10	2012–2021	Viva TV	Sam Pinto
Especially For You	2012–2021	Viva TV	Nikki Bacolod; Yassi Pressman
Pinoy Star Stories	2012–2021	Viva TV	
Star Yayey	2012–2021	Viva TV	
The Jon Santos Show	2012–2021	Viva TV	Jon Santos
Annebishowsa	2012–2021	Viva TV	Anne Curtis
Concert		Viva TV	
Pantasya		Viva TV	Katya Santos; Maui Taylor
Petra's Panniest		Viva TV	Petra Mahalimuyak
KC.COM		Viva TV	KC Concepcion
Sharon: Kasama Mo, Kapatid	2012–2013	TV5	Sharon Cuneta
Born to be a Star	2016–2021	TV5	Ogie Alcasid; Mark Bautista; Yassi Pressman (season 1); Matteo Guidicelli; Kim Molina (season 2)
Ang Panday	2016	TV5	Richard Gutierrez; Jasmine Curtis-Smith
Bakit Manipis ang Ulap?	2016	TV5	Claudine Barretto; Diether Ocampo; Cesar Montano; Meg Imperial
Oh My Guardians!	2017	Viva TV	Donnalyn Bartolome; Elia Ilano; Alonzo Muhlach
The OPM Show	2017–2018	Viva TV	Nikki Bacolod
Ghost Adventures	2019	Sari-Sari Channel; TV5	Benjie Paras; Pio Balbuena
Masked Singer Pilipinas	2020	TV5	Billy Crawford
The Wall Philippines	2021–2022	TV5 (season 1); GMA Network (season 2)	Billy Crawford
1000 Heartbeats: Pintig Pinoy	2021	TV5	Xian Lim
Rolling In It Philippines	2021–2022	TV5	Yassi Pressman
Puto	2021	TV5	McCoy de Leon; Herbert Bautista
Encounter	2021	TV5	Cristine Reyes; Diego Loyzaga
Di Na Muli	2021	TV5	Julia Barretto; Marco Gumabao; Marco Gallo
Kung Pwede Lang	2021	Vivamax; Viva One (as of 2023)	Carlyn Ocampo; Rosanna Roces; Dennis Padilla; Dexter Doria
The Seniors	2022	Vivamax; Viva One (as of 2023)	Julia Barretto; Ella Cruz; Awra Briguela; Andrea Babbiera; McCoy De Leon; Gab Lagman; Andre Yllana
Lulu	2022	Vivamax; Viva One (as of 2023)	Rhen Escaño; Rita Martinez
The Rain In España	2023	Viva One	Heaven Peralejo; Marco Gallo
Minsan pa Nating Hagkan ang Nakaraan	2023	TV5	Cristine Reyes; Marco Gumabao; Cesar Montano
For the Love	2023	TV5	Pops Fernandez
Deadly Love	2023	Viva One	Louise delos Reyes; Jaclyn Jose; Raffy Tejada; Marco Gumabao McCoy de Leon
Roadkillers	2023	Amazon Prime Video	Nadine Lustre
Safe Skies, Archer	2023–2024	Viva One	Jerome Ponce; Krissha Viaje
Lumuhod Ka Sa Lupa	2024–2025	TV5	Kiko Estrada; Sarah Lahbati; Sid Lucero; Rhen Escaño; Gardo Versoza
Sem Break	2024	Viva One	Jerome Ponce; Krissha Viaje; Aubrey Caraan; Keann Johnson; Hyacinth Callado; Gab Lagman
Da Pers Family	2024–2025	TV5	Aga Muhlach; Charlene Gonzales; Atasha Muhlach; Andres Muhlach
Chasing in the Wild	2024–2025	Viva One	Gab Lagman; Hyacinth Callado
Ang Mutya ng Section E	2025–2026	Viva One	Andres Muhlach; Ashtine Olviga; Rabin Angeles
Avenues of the Diamond	2025	Viva One	Aubrey Caraan; Lance Carr
Totoy Bato	2025–2026	TV5	Kiko Estrada
Seducing Drake Palma	2025	Viva One	Rabin Angeles; Angela Muji
Para sa Isa't Isa	2025–2026	TV5	Krissha Viaje; Jerome Ponce
Bad Genius: The Series	2025	Viva One	Atasha Muhlach; Jairus Aquino; Gab Lagman; Hyacinth Callado
I Love You Since 1892	2025–2026	Viva One	Heaven Peralejo; Jerome Ponce; Joseph Marco
Golden Scenery of Tomorrow	2025–2026	Viva One	Bea Binene; Wilbert Ross
Project Loki	2026	Viva One	Dylan Menor; Jayda Avanzado; Marco Gallo
Hell University	2026	Viva One	Heart Ryan; Zeke Polina
BuyBust: The Undesirables	2026	Netflix	Anne Curtis; Gerald Anderson
Viva One Originals: Ashtine	2026	Viva One	Ashtine Olviga
My Husband is a Mafia Boss	2026	Viva One	Joseph Marco; Rhen Escaño
Viva One Originals: RabGel	2026	Viva One	Rabin Angeles; Angela Muji
Viva's Next Big Star	2026	Viva One	Various casts
Dating Alys Perez	2026	Viva One	Rabin Angeles; Angela Muji
Our Yesterday's Escape	2026	Viva One	Jairus Aquino; Nicole Omilio
Fight for My Way	2026	Viva One	David Licauco; Ashtine Olviga; McCoy de Leon; Aubrey Caraan
