= Avenues of the Diamond =

- Official release poster
- Written by: Gwyneth Jan Saludes
- Screenplay by: Charisse Bayona; Alyssa Almario; Regil Gelito
- Directed by: Gino M. Santos
- Starring: Lance Carr; Aubrey Caraan
- Country of origin: Philippines
- Original language: Filipino
- No. of seasons: 1
- No. of episodes: 16

Production
- Producers: Vincent del Rosario III; Veronique del Rosario-Corpus; Valerie del Rosario
- Production company: Studio Viva

Original release
- Network: Viva One
- Release: April 11 – July 25, 2025

Avenues of the Diamond, is a 2025 Philippine romantic drama series directed by Gino M. Santos, written by Charisse Bayona, Alyssa Almario and Regil Gelito. It stars Lance Carr and Aubrey Caraan.

== Synopsis ==
Samantha, an Ateneo communication student is devastated when her parents forced her into an arranged marriage to Cylden Ramirez, a snobbish University of the Philippines (UP) medical student.

== Cast ==
Main cast

- Aubrey Caraan as Samantha Maureen "Sam" ("Maui") Vera
- Lance Carr as Clyden "Cy" Jaile Ramirez

Supporting cast

- Heaven Peralejo as Louisse Natasha "Luna" Valeria
- Marco Gallo as Kalix Jace Martinez
- Krissha Viaje as Ashianna "Yanna" Kim Fernandez
- Jerome Ponce as Akihiro "Hiro" Leonel Juarez
- Gab Lagman as Sebastian "Sevi" Vincent Camero
- Hyacinth Callado as Amora Elyse "Ely" Ledezma
- Bea Binene as Avianna Rye "Via" Diaz
- Wilbert Ross as Larkin "Arkin" Olivier Sanchez
- Nicole Omillo as Kierra Zylene Ynares
- Jairus Aquino as Ciandrei "Shan" Kyle Lopez
- Claudine Barretto as Selene Vera
- Bobby Andrews as Stephen Vera
- Abby Bautista as Naomi Celestine Vera
- Jojo Abellana as Christopher Ramirez
- Nikka Ruiz as Jaida Ramirez
- Maru Delgado as Charles Ramirez
- Ethan David as Colin Ramirez
- Andrei Yllana as Adonis Saide Figueroa
- Frost Sandoval as Leo Perez
- Dani Zee as Avrielle "Avi" Haven Fernandez Juarez
- Franki Russell as Giselle Davis
- PJ Rosario as Haze Limuel Juarez
- Yanyan De Jesus as Ridgen Alcazar
- Kelley Day as Eva
- Aviona Dass as Raylee
- Liz Gonzales as Nicole
- M Drew as Ayessa
- Jerlyn Mae as Riya
- Andre Cue as Jaron
- Alecca Adarna as Francine
- Peewee O'Hara as Lola Marian
- Gaye Piccio as Dr. Lana
- Peter Garrido as Tristan
- Jaivier Caangay as CJ
- Ria Tiozon as maid
- Marivic Ramos as maid
- Jessica Nogas as maid

== Production ==
On April 6, 2025, Viva One announced the release of the fourth installment of Gwy Saludes hit series based on Wattpad novels, namely Avenues of the Diamond. The series introduced Lance Carr and Aubrey Caraan as a new love team. Senior actors Claudine Barretto and Bobby Andrews joined them as well.

== Episodes ==
Episode list
No.	Title	Original air date
1	The Senator's daughter and the Activist	April 11, 2025
2	The House on Ligaya street	April 19, 2025
3	Maui	April 25, 2025
4	Back burner?	May 2, 2025
5	For Real this time	May 9, 2025
6	When you know, you know	May 16, 2025
7	Nothing like the first time	May 23, 2025
8	Better Days	May 30, 2025
9	The beginning of the end	June 6, 2025
10	See you around	June 13, 2025
11	The Supermodel and the Doctor	June 20, 2025
12	A little hope never hurts	June 27, 2025
13	All the things left unsaid	July 4, 2025
14	All we have is now	July 11, 2025
15	Everything we left behind	July 18, 2025
16	Finally free	July 25, 2025
