= Golden Scenery of Tomorrow =

Philippine teen romantic comedy television series

- Promotional poster
- Also known as: GSOT
- Genre: Romantic comedy; Teen drama
- Based on: Golden Scenery of Tomorrow by Gwy Saludes
- Directed by: Victor Villanueva
- Starring: Bea Binene; Wilbert Ross
- Country of origin: Philippines
- Original language: Filipino
- No. of episodes: 22

Production
- Running time: 47–65 minutes
- Production companies: Studio Viva; Wattpad Webtoon Studios

Original release
- Network: Viva One
- Release: October 18, 2025 – March 14, 2026

Related
- The Rain In España; Safe Skies, Archer; Chasing in the Wild; Avenues Of The Diamond

Golden Scenery of Tomorrow is a Philippine teen romantic comedy television series starring Bea Binene and Wilbert Ross. It is based on the Wattpad story by the Filipino author Gwy Saludes, who is better known by her pseudonym 4reuminct. The series premiered on October 18, 2025 to March 14, 2026 on Viva One.

== Cast and characters ==
Main cast

- Bea Binene as Avianna Rye "Via" Diaz
- Wilbert Ross as Larkin Olivier "Arkin" Sanchez

Supporting cast

- Heaven Paralejo as Louisse Natasha "Luna" Valeria
- Nicole Omillo as Kierra Zylene "Ke" Ynares
- Krissha Viaje as Ashianna Kim "Yanna" Fernandez
- Aubrey Caraan as Samantha Maureen "Sam" Vera
- Gab Lagman as Sebastian Vincent "Sevi" Camero

Guest Appearances

- Marco Gallo as Kalix Jace Martinez
- Jerome Ponce as Akihiro Leonel "Hiro" Juarez
- Hyacinth Callado as Amora Elyse "Ely" Ledezma
- Lance Carr as Clyden Jaile Ramirez
- Jairus Aquino as Ciandrei Kyle "Shan" Lopez

== Episodes ==
No.	Title	Original release date
1	"The Beginning of Us"	October 18, 2025
2	"Best Friends"	October 24, 2025
3	"Happy Crush"	October 31, 2025
4	"Blurred Lines"	November 7, 2025
5	""Lintek na Feelings" (Damn These Feelings 1)"	November 14, 2025
6	""Damn Damin" (Damn These Feelings 2)"	November 21, 2025
7	""Mahal kita...?" (I love you?)"	November 28, 2025
8	"Cut the Chase"	December 6, 2025
9	"The Fangirl and the Actor"	December 12, 2025
10	"Officially Yours"	December 20, 2025
11	"What Lovers Do"	December 27, 2025
12	"Quiet Before Chaos"	January 3, 2026
13	"The Other Girl?"	January 10, 2026
14	""Ang Ating Wakas" ("The End of Us")"	January 17, 2026
15	"Strangers Now"	January 24, 2026
16	"The Architect and the Musician"	January 31, 2026
17	"The Nearness of You"	February 7, 2026
18	"Changing Tides"	February 14, 2026
19	"Like Magnets"	February 21, 2026
20	""Tulad ng Dati" (Just like Before)"	February 28, 2026
21	"Last Goodbye"	March 7, 2026
22	""Ginintuang Tanawin" (Golden Scenery)"	March 14, 2026

== Production ==
The first teaser for the series was released during Vivarkada: The Ultimate Fancon and Grand Concert on August 15, 2025. The official poster and second teaser were unveiled at the Golden Scenery of Tomorrow Grand Media Conference on October 1, 2025. The official trailer was released on October 16, 2025. The series is scheduled to premiere on October 18, 2025.

== Soundtrack ==
Golden Scenery of Tomorrow

Soundtrack album by Various artists
- Genres: Romance; Soundtrack
- Language: Filipino
- Label: Viva Records

Tracklisting
No.	Title	Singer(s)	Length
1.	"Ginintuang Tanawin"	Wilbert Ross
2.	"Ngiti"	The Juans	3:21
3.	"Ikaw ang Musika"	Gwy Saludes & Marc Alfaro
4.	"My Favorite Movie"	Gwy Saludes	5:30
5.	"TBA"
6.	"TBA"
