= Viva One =

Filipino streaming service

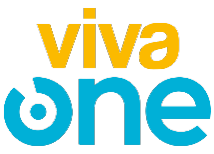
- Former name: Viva Prime (2023)
- Website type: OTT video on demand streaming platform
- Available in: Filipino
- Headquarters: 7/F East Tower, Tektite Towers, Exchange Road, Ortigas Center, Pasig, Metro Manila
- Country of origin: Philippines
- Area served: Worldwide
- Owner: Viva Communications
- Key people: Vic del Rosario Jr. (Chairman and CEO); Vincent del Rosario (President and COO)
- Industry: Entertainment
- Services: Film production; Film distribution; Television production; Television distribution
- Parent: Viva Digital
- Website: vivaone.ph
- Advertising: Yes
- Registration: Monthly/yearly subscription required to access content
- Launched: January 29, 2023; 3 years ago
- Current status: Active

Viva One (formerly Viva Prime) is a Philippine subscription video on-demand over-the-top streaming service owned and operated by Viva Communications, that was launched on January 29, 2023. It is the second video on demand streaming service of the company after VMX.

== History ==
On January 29, 2023, the second anniversary of Vivamax, the company launched its second streaming platform, the Viva Prime, which became accessible on the Vivamax app, offering a mix of local and international content. Viva rebranded the Viva Prime in February 2023, marking a shift, with the company launching a separate app called Viva One.

== Content ==
Viva One has several unique contents created under the dubbed Viva One Originals. These are made as one of the shows to be able to cater to different tastes, interests, and age groups through the form of dramas, documentaries, and reality shows. This way, the network will be able to reach a wider viewership, which offers something to everyone.

=== List of original programming ===
==== Original series ====
Title	Genre	Premiere	Seasons	Runtime	Actors
The Rain In España	Teen; Romantic drama	May 1 – July 3, 2023	10 episodes	45-50 min	Heaven Peralejo; Marco Gallo
Deadly Love	Mystery; Romantic drama	July 10 – August 13, 2023	6 episodes	50-60 min	Louise delos Reyes; Jaclyn Jose; Marco Gumabao; McCoy de Leon; Raffy Tejada
Safe Skies, Archer	Teen; Romantic drama	November 20, 2023 - January 21, 2024	10 episodes	50-60 min	Krissha Viaje; Jerome Ponce
Sem Break	Horror	May 10 - June 14, 2024	6 episodes	40-45 min	Jerome Ponce; Krissha Viaje; Aubrey Caraan; Keann Johnson; Gab Lagman; Hyacinth Callado
Chasing in the Wild	Teen; Romantic drama	August 16 – December 14, 2024	19 episodes	45-60 min	Gab Lagman; Hyacinth Callado
Ang Mutya ng Section E	Romantic comedy Teen drama Coming-of-age	January 3 – April 25, 2025	16 episodes	52-71 min	Ashtine Olviga; Andres Muhlach; Rabin Angeles
Avenues of the Diamond	Teen; Romantic drama	April 11 – July 25, 2025	16 episodes	49-60 min	Aubrey Caraan; Lance Carr
Seducing Drake Palma	Romantic comedy Teen	June 15 – September 26, 2025	16 episodes	45–50 min	Rabin Angeles; Angela Muji
Bad Genius: The Series	Crime thriller Drama	July 17 – October 10, 2025	13 episodes	40-55 min	Atasha Muhlach; Jairus Aquino; Gab Lagman; Hyacinth Callado
I Love You Since 1892	Historical fiction Romantic drama	September 5, 2025 – January 2, 2026	18 episodes	47-60 min	Heaven Peralejo; Jerome Ponce; Joseph Marco
Golden Scenery of Tomorrow	Teen; Romantic drama	October 18, 2025 – March 14, 2026	22 episodes	46-60 min	Bea Binene; Wilbert Ross
Ang Mutya ng Section E: The Dark Side (Book 2)	Romantic comedy Teen drama Coming-of-age	December 5, 2025 – January 30, 2026	9 episodes	50-60 min	Ashtine Olviga; Andres Muhlach; Rabin Angeles
Hell University	Mystery; Thriller; Horror	February 6, 2026 – June 5, 2026	18 episodes	51-58 min	Heart Ryan; Zeke Polina
Project Loki	Mystery; Crime thriller	February 21, 2026 – present	9 episodes	56-60 min	Dylan Menor; Jayda Avanzado; Marco Gallo
Viva One Originals: Ashtine	Anthology	March 13 – April 4, 2026	4 episodes	60 min	Ashtine Olviga
My Husband is a Mafia Boss	Romantic comedy Action; Teen drama	April 11, 2026 – present	N/A	N/A	Joseph Marco; Rhen Escaño

== Device support ==
Viva One is available for streaming via web browsers on Windows, macOS and Linux, as well as apps on iOS and Apple TV, Android and Android TV, Chromecast and ChromeOS devices.
