= Wilbert Ross =

Filipino singer, actor and dancer (born 1997)

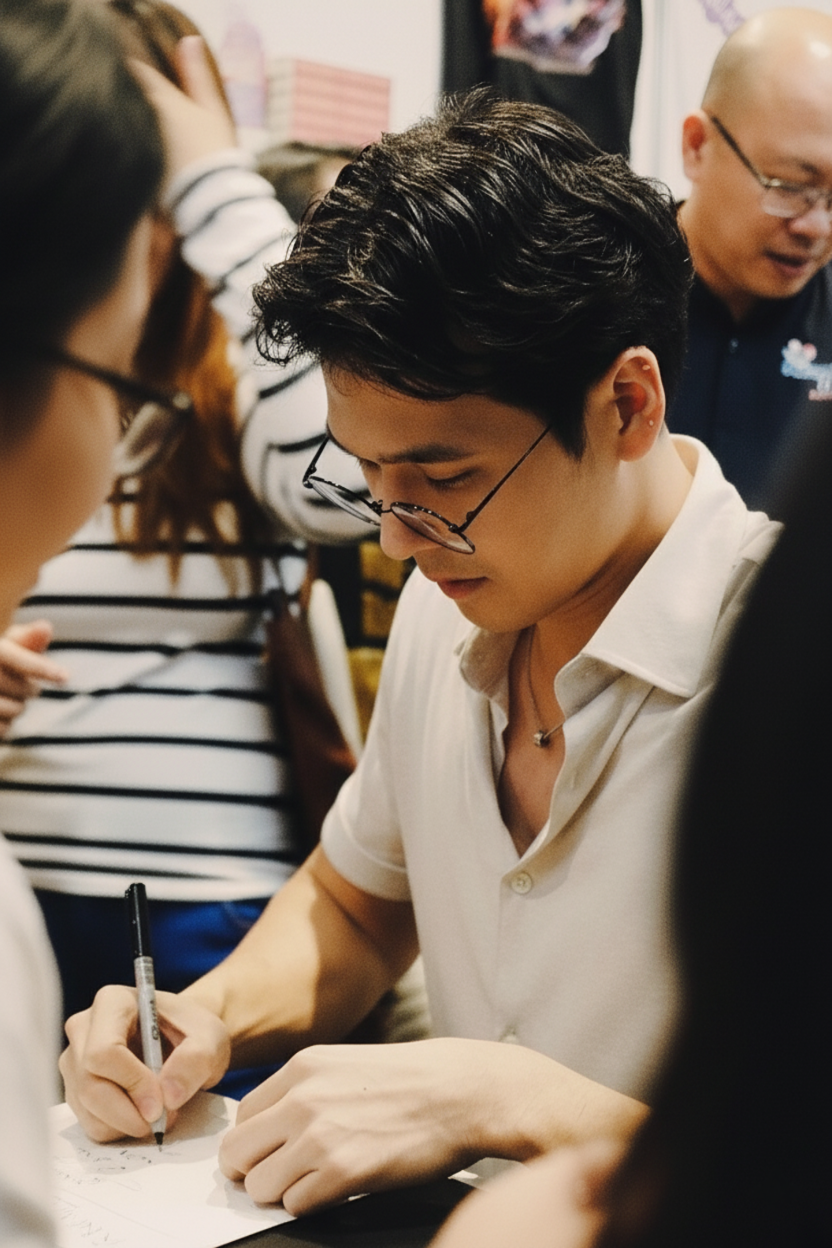
- Ross in 2025

Background information
- Born: Wilbert Marcelo Rosalyn; June 17, 1997 (age 29); Davao del Sur, Philippines
- Education: Golden State College
- Genres: R&B/soul; pop
- Occupations: Singer; actor; dancer
- Years active: 2016–present
- Labels: Star Music (2016–2020); Viva Artists Agency (2020–present)
- Member of: Hashtags
- Website: aboutwilbertross.carrd.co

YouTube information
- Channel: Wilbert Ross TV
- Years active: 2015–present
- Genres: Music; vlogging
- Subscribers: 1.79 million
- Views: 93.7 million
- Last updated: July 27, 2026

Wilbert Marcelo Rosalyn (born June 17, 1997), known professionally as Wilbert Ross, is a Filipino singer, songwriter, dancer, host, producer, director, published author, and entrepreneur. Regarded as the "Multimedia Crooner" by the media. He is known as a member of Hashtags, a male-group dance performer on the noontime variety show It's Showtime on ABS-CBN.

He gained recognition as a recording artist following the release of his debut single "Maaari Ba" (2019), which entered the Top 10 of the Spotify Viral 50 Philippines chart. He later released several singles including "Langga" (2022), "Makaluma" (2024), and "Ginintuang Tanawin" (2025), which further established his presence in the Filipino music industry.

Aside from music, Ross has also expanded into acting and digital entertainment. He starred in the digital series Ang Lalaki sa Likod ng Profile (2023), the film Nokturno (2024), and the television series Golden Scenery of Tomorrow (2025–2026).

== Career ==
=== 2016: Tawag Ng Tanghalan ===
In 2016, Wilbert Ross left Davao Del Sur to pursue his career in Manila. In February of the same year, he joined Tawag ng Tanghalan, a singing competition segment of It's Showtime on ABS-CBN. He performed "Hello" by Lionel Richie but was eliminated during the daily round.

=== 2016: Pinoy Boyband Superstar ===
Later that year, In September 2016, Ross auditioned at ABS-CBN's competition on search for the newest boyband in the Philippines Pinoy Boyband Superstar where he got 95% of the votes from the all-girl audience on the first round. He advanced to the Top 20 but was eliminated before reaching the Top 12, so he returned to Davao.

=== 2017–2020: Hashtags and early acting career ===
In 2017, He learned about the public audition for Hashtags. in February 2017, Ross was introduced as a new member of the dance group Hashtags that performs regularly on the ABS-CBN noontime show “It’s Showtime". The group appeared daily on the program for several years, gaining popularity among viewers.

In May 2019, Ross signed a recording contract with Star Music, marking the beginning of his career as a recording artist. Under the label, Ross was set to release original music, transitioning from being known primarily as a member of the dance group Hashtags to pursuing a solo music career.

Ross released his debut single, "Maaari Ba", on May 31, 2019. He also ventured into acting, appearing in supporting roles, including the commercially successful film Hello, Love, Goodbye.

During this period, he gained online attention through collaborations with YouTuber Zeinab Harake, including a "24-Hours Magjowa Challenge" video. Harake also starred in the official music video of "Maaari Ba", which garnered over a million views. Ross subsequently began producing vlog content on YouTube.

=== 2020–2022: Transition to Viva and music releases ===
In June 2020, Ross released the single "Kung Siya Man", a follow-up to "Maaari Ba", under StarPop. Later that year, he signed with Viva Entertainment, where he took on supporting roles in projects such as Shoot, Shoot: Di Ko Siya Titigilan, directed by Al Tantay, and Crush Kong Curly, directed by GB Sampedro, where he was paired with AJ Raval.

He also appeared in the fantasy-comedy series Puto, starring Herbert Bautista and McCoy de Leon. Ross later headlined his own comedy film Boy Bastos, which streamed on Vivamax.

On July 29, 2022, he released the single "Langga", which followed a premiere of its official music video starring Zeinab Harake, trended on YouTube upon release.

=== 2023–2024: Extended play, directing, and television projects ===
In 2023, Ross appeared in the comedy film Working Boys 2: Choose Your Papa, a modern adaptation of the 1985 film originally starring Tito Sotto, Vic Sotto, and Joey de Leon.

On October 13, 2023, he released his debut extended play (EP), Lampara, which included the tracks "Byahe ng Buhay", "Dramatic Actor", and "Benteng Ukit". He described “Byahe Ng Buhay” as a lyrical journey through life's ups and downs, “Dramatic Actor” as a blend of melodious vocals with a touch of drama, and “Benteng Ukit” as a captivating song about self-inflicted wounds, that lingers in the listener's head and heart long after it has been heard. Ross wrote it during a bout with clinical depression.

Lampara means lamp, and when lighted, it brings light. Wilbert Ross hopes to bring to the listeners of his first EP, a message that light exists, and it is always there.

Ross also starred in the Puregold digital series Ang Lalaki sa Likod ng Profile, alongside Yukii Takahashi. Around this time, he began directing his own music videos and established his creative team, Chalkzone Creatives.

In 2024, Ross expanded his acting portfolio with appearances in projects such as Pagpag 24/7, Men Are from QC, Women Are from Alabang, Nokturno, and Hello, Love, Again. He also released the single "Makaluma" and was introduced as Larkin Sanchez in the University Series Chasing in the Wild.

=== 2025–present: Album debut, writing career, and concert success ===
On July 8, 2025, Ross officially renewed his contract with Viva Entertainment, marking a significant milestone in his career and solidifying his ongoing relationship with the Philippine entertainment firm. The renewal highlighted the company's continued confidence in Ross' artistic direction and commercial appeal, with several upcoming projects in development, including music releases, live performances, and digital content.

On August 15, 2025, VivaOne announced the series Golden Scenery of Tomorrow, starring Ross and Bea Binene, during the VIVARKADA: The Ultimate Fancon And Grand Concert. The series premiered in October 2025.

On September 15, 2025, Ross debuted as an author with the release of his novel Pagbilang Kong Tatlo, a suspense thriller launched during the Manila International Book Fair.

On November 7, 2025, he released his debut studio album Aking Musika, a nine-track project described as a musical autobiography. The album featured songs such as "Dulo ng Pahina", "Maliwanag Mong Mundo", "Langga", and "Nakangiti", as well as "Ginintuang Tanawin", which served as the original soundtrack forGolden Scenery of Tomorrow.

The following day, November 8, 2025, Ross held his first ticketed album launch.

In March 2026, Ross held a two-day sold-out gig titled Musika’t Hiling, marking another milestone in his live performances.

In April 2026, during the VivaOne Fan Takeover Concert, Ross and Binene's first film together was announced, a Philippine adaptation of the Thai film Pee Mak. The project marked their first big-screen collaboration following their series success.

During the same event, a teaser for Ross' first major solo concert was unveiled. The following day, Viva Records officially announced that Wilbert Ross would hold his first solo concert, at the New Frontier Theater in Quezon City, in July. Titled WRTen by Wilbert Ross, the show was later extended to two days after tickets for the first day sold out within 15 minutes of release.

== Personal life ==
He is of Chinese descent through his biological father and Indonesian-Filipino through his maternal grandfather who migrated from Indonesia to the Philippines and settled in Davao.

== Discography ==
=== Studio albums ===
List of studio albums with selected details
Title	Album Details
Aking Musika	Released: November 7, 2025 (PH); Label: Viva Records; Format: digital download, streaming

=== Extended plays ===
List of extended plays with selected details
Title	Album Details
LAMPARA	Released: October 13, 2023 (PH); Label: Viva Records; Format: digital download, streaming; Track listing: 1. Handa Ako; 2. Benteng Ulit; 3. Dramatic Actor; 4. Byahe ng Buhay; 5. Andito Lang Ako; 6. Nakangiti

Singles
Year	Title	Album	Label	ref
2019	Maaari Ba	Non-album singles	Star Music	
2020	Kung Siya Man	Non-album singles	Star Music	
2020	Di Na Umabot	Non-album singles	Viva Records	
2021	Di Ko Alam	AKING MUSIKA	Viva Records	
2021	Crush Kong Curly	Non-album singles	Viva Records	
2022	Oh Jusko	Non-album singles	Viva Records	
2022	Lil Things	Non-album singles	Viva Records	
2022	Langga	AKING MUSIKA	Viva Records	
2022	Andito Lang Ako	LAMPARA	Viva Records	
2023	Nakangiti	LAMPARA	Viva Records	
2023	Sasabihin Ko Na	AKING MUSIKA	Viva Records	
2023	Handa Ako	LAMPARA	Viva Records	
2023	Benteng Ukit	LAMPARA	Viva Records	
2023	Dramatic Actor	LAMPARA	Viva Records	
2023	Byahe ng Buhay	LAMPARA	Viva Records	
2024	Makaluma	AKING MUSIKA	Viva Records	
2025	Dulo Ng Pahina	AKING MUSIKA	Viva Records	
2025	Maliwanag Mong Mundo	AKING MUSIKA	Viva Records	
2025	Sa Liwanag Ng Buwan	AKING MUSIKA	Viva Records	
2025	Ginintuang Tanawin	AKING MUSIKA	Viva Records	
2026	Paggising Kong Muli	Non-album singles	Viva Records	
2026	Ikaw Ang Musika	Non-album singles	Viva Records	
2026	Avianna	Non-album singles	Viva Records	
2026	Paruparo	Non-album singles	Viva Records	
2026	Litrato	Pee Mak (Original Movie Soundtrack)	Viva Records	

== Filmography ==
=== Television ===
Year	Program	Note(s)	Ref.
2016	Tawag ng Tanghalan	TNT Daily contender	
2016	Pinoy Boyband Superstar	Himself / Contestant	
2016–2020; 2026–present	ASAP XP	Himself / Semi-regular and Co-host	
2017–2020	It's Showtime	Himself / Hashtag Member-Performer and Co-Host	
2017	Magandang Buhay	Guest	
2017	Gandang Gabi Vice	Guest	
2017	Ipaglaban Mo: Pikon	Albert	
2018	Ipaglaban Mo: Diploma	Sonny	
2018	Wansapanataym: ManiKEN ni Monica	Dwight Ibanez	
2019	Tonight with Boy Abunda	Guest	
2019	Maalala Mo Kaya: Bracelet	Zen	
2021	Puto	Johnston	
2023	Team A Season 2	Enzo	
2024	For The Love: Ang Pag-ibig	Mark	
2024	Chasing in the Wild	Larkin Olivier "Arkin" D. Sanchez	
2024	Gud Morning Kapatid	Guest	
2024	One Balita Pilipinas	Guest	
2025	Avenues of the Diamond	Larkin Olivier "Arkin" D. Sanchez	
2025	Golden Scenery of Tomorrow	Larkin Olivier "Arkin" D. Sanchez	
2026	Love U Lots	Estong	
2026	Our Yesterday's Escape	Larkin Olivier "Arkin" D. Sanchez	

=== Film ===
Year	Title	Role	Notes	Ref.
2017	Bes and the Beshies	Sonny		
2018	Asuang	Harry Prince		
2019	Hello, Love, Goodbye	Joey Fabregas		
2021	Shoot shoot!	Pong		
2021	Crush Kong Curly	Peter Salcedo		
2022	Boy Bastos	Felix		
2022	High on Sex	Gibo		
2022	5 in 1	Johnny "Dick" Jordi		
2023	Stalkers	Harry		
2023	Working Boys: Choose your papa	Biboy		
2023	Pantaxa Laiya			
2024	Pagpag 24/7	Jimboy		
2024	Men Are From QC, Women Are From Alabang	Raf		
2024	Nokturno	Manu		
2024	Hello, Love, Again	Joey Fabregas		
2025	Isolated			
2026	The Guardian	Jason		
2026	Pee Mak Philippine Adaptation	Phil Mark "Mak"		

=== Webcast ===
Year	Title	Network	Note(s)	Ref.
2024	Monster RX93.1	Monster RX93.1 Facebook & YouTube channel		

=== Web series ===
Year	Title	Role
2023	Ang Lalaki Sa Likod ng Profile	Bryce / @nokage

=== Music video ===
Year	Title	Artist	Role	Ref.
2019	Alaala	Alekzandra	Himself	
2019	Maaari Ba	Wilbert Ross	Himself	
2020	Sa Panaginip Na Lang	Daryl Ong	Himself	
2021	Crush Kong Curly	Wilbert Ross	Himself	
2022	Karapatan	Ferodina	Himself	
2022	Andito Lang Ako	Wilbert Ross	Himself	
2023	Nakangiti	Wilbert Ross	Himself	
2023	Andito Lang Ako	Wilbert Ross		
2025	Makaluma	Krissha Viaje and Jerome Ponce		
2025	Ginintuang Tanawin	Wilbert Ross and Bea Binene	Larkin Olivier "Arkin" D. Sanchez	
2026	Maliwanag Mong Mundo	Wilbert Ross and Bea Binene	Larkin Olivier "Arkin" D. Sanchez	
2026	Dulo ng Pahina	Wilbert Ross and Bea Binene	Himself	

== Concerts ==
Concert participations
Event name	Dates	Venue	Location	Ref.
Gandemic Vice Ganda: The VG-TAL Concert	July 17–18, 2021	Araneta Coliseum	Metro Manila	
Beks2Beks2Beks Concert	November 19, 2022	Aratani theatre	Los Angeles, California	
Krissha Viaje's “ME” Birthday Concert	October 12, 2024	Carlos P. Romulo Auditorium RCBC Plaza, Makati	Makati City	
VIVARKADA: THE ULTIMATE FANCON AND GRAND CONCERT	August 15, 2025	Araneta Coliseum	Metro Manila	
VIVAONE: The Next Fan Takeover	April 18, 2026	New Frontier Theater	Quezon City	
VIVAONE: The Next Fan Takeover THE REPEAT	June 06, 2026	New Frontier Theater	Quezon City	
WRten by Wilbert Ross: 1st Major & 10th Anniversary Concert	July 25-26, 2026	New Frontier Theater	Quezon City	

== Bibliography ==
=== Published Books ===
Year	Title	Genre	
2025	Pagbilang Kong Tatlo	Mystery, thriller, and suspense	
2026	Atleta Comic 1	Superhero fiction, science fiction, action, and fantasy	AdLikhain Hero Verse
2026	Atleta Novel	Superhero fiction, science fiction, action, and fantasy	AdLikhain Hero Verse
2026	Atleta Comic 2: Atleta vs Takaw	Superhero fiction, science fiction, action, and fantasy	AdLikhain Hero Verse
2026	Binhi Comic 1	Superhero fiction, science fiction, action, and fantasy	AdLikhain Hero Verse
2026	Karpintero Comic 1	Superhero fiction, science fiction, action, and fantasy	AdLikhain Hero Verse

== Awards and Nominations ==
Name of the award ceremony, year presented, award category, nominee(s) of the award, and the result of the nomination
Award ceremony	Year	Category	Recipient(s) and nominee(s)	Result	Ref.
2017 Box Office Entertainment Awards	2017	Most Popular Recording/Performing Group	#Hashtags	Won	
Rawr Awards 2018	2018	Favorite Group of the Year	#Hashtags	Won	
32nd PMPC Star Awards for Television	2018	Best New Male Personality	Wilbert Ross	Nominated	
Awit Awards	2020	New Male Recording Artist	Wilbert Ross	Nominated	
Awit Awards	2020	Song Of The Year	Maaari Ba	Nominated	
Awit Awards	2020	Record of the Year	Maaari Ba	Nominated	
89.5 Star FM Baguio Best of 2020	2020	Male OPM Artist Of The Year	Wilbert Ross	Nominated	
Wish Music Awards	2022	Wish Contemporary Folk Song of the Year	Langga	Nominated	
10th Platinum Stallion National Media Awards 2025	2025	Best Supporting Actor	Wilbert Ross	Won	
