= Lilim (film) =

- Theatrical release poster
- Directed by: Mikhail Red
- Screenplay by: Nikolas Red
- Story by: Mikhail Red
- Produced by: Vincent Del Rosario III; Valerie S. Del Rosario; Veronique Del Rosario-Corpus; Micah Tadena
- Starring: Heaven Peralejo; Eula Valdez; Ryza Cenon
- Cinematography: Raymond Red
- Edited by: Nikolas Red
- Music by: Myka Magsaysay; Paul Sigua
- Production companies: Viva Films; Studio Viva
- Distributed by: Viva Films
- Release date: March 12, 2025
- Running time: 109 minutes
- Country: Philippines
- Language: Filipino

Lilim is a 2025 Philippine supernatural horror film by the screenplay of Nikolas Red, story and directed by Mikhail Red. It stars Heaven Peralejo, Eula Valdez and Ryza Cenon. This is the first collaboration of Mikhail Red to his father Raymond Red who played as a cinematographer of the film.

== Plot ==
Set in the Philippines during the Martial Law era in 1983, Lilim follows siblings Issa and Tomas who flee their home after Issa kills their abusive father in self-defense. On the run from authorities, they are brought to Helping Hands, a remote orphanage in the mountains run by nuns led by Sister Marga.

At first, the orphanage seems like a sanctuary, but the siblings soon realize something is wrong. The place is unnervingly quiet, the other children are withdrawn, and strange symbols cover the walls. The nuns perform rituals at night, and children begin disappearing without explanation.

Issa starts experiencing nightmares of shadowy figures, guttural whispers, and blood rituals performed in candlelit catacombs beneath the orphanage. She discovers that the nuns are part of a cult worshiping a nocturnal deity they call the “Lilim,” a spirit that feeds on suffering and purity. The children are being prepared as sacrifices.

As Issa investigates, she finds evidence of previous “cleansings” dating back decades. She learns that the cult believes offering innocent blood grants protection from outside dangers and promises eternal life to the faithful. The nuns believe Tomas, being the youngest and most “pure,” will please the Lilim most.

Issa tries to escape with Tomas, but the nuns drug her and take him to the ritual chamber. In a desperate final act, Issa fights her way through the darkened orphanage, lit only by flickering candles and the eyes of watching spirits. She interrupts the ceremony just as the cult summons the Lilim, an enormous creature of smoke and bone with many eyes and a voice like wind through graves.

She sets the orphanage on fire using a lantern and oil, freeing the remaining children. As the cult burns, the Lilim lets out a deafening shriek and vanishes into the smoke. Issa and Tomas escape into the forest, but in the final scene, a surviving nun watches them from afar, whispering a prayer to the Lilim hinting the horror may not be over.

The Netflix version features an alternative ending where Tomas asks Issa to go back to help the other boys. During the escape, Tomas hears a scream and looks back to see Issa seemingly possessed by the Lilim and attacking one of the boys. Tomas leaves Issa and eventually escapes the orphanage. In the final scene, the surviving nuns offer a baby to Issa as a sacrifice; Issa is shown wide-eyed and with a bloody mouth, indicating that she has been fully possessed by the Lilim.

== Cast ==
- Heaven Peralejo as Issa
- Eula Valdez as Marga
- Ryza Cenon as Helena
- Mon Confiado as Fred
- Gold Aceron as Gabriel
- Skywalker David as Tomas
- Rafa Siguion-Reyna as Darwin
- Nicole Omillo as Trining
- Phoebe Walker as Josephine

== Production ==
Lilim was shot in an boarding school and period-specific interiors was recreated inside a studio. The director said that his inspiration for the film is the game Diablo.

== Release ==
The film was originally planned to release in 2024 Metro Manila Film Festival but was delayed and released on March 12, 2025, under Viva Films.

The film also premiered at 54th International Film Festival Rotterdam on January 30, 2025.

== Reception ==
Carlos Pineda of Spin.ph gave the film a positive review and wrote; Now is his latest film better than the likes of Eerie and Deleter? It is hard to tell, however it can be argued that Red has been very consistent in producing really good plot twists, while also showcasing his willingness to experiment on different horror tropes.

Ard Vijn of ScreenAnarchy also gave the film a positive feedback and wrote; Lilim could just as well have premièred at the Imagine Film Festival or BUT Breda, and that is meant as a compliment. For it is a mean, lean crowdpleaser of a genre film. And I had a lot of fun with it.

Kieff Iporac of SINEGANG.ph gave more measured praise by commending the film's technical execution and pacing while criticizing its reliance on genre tropes.

Archi Sengupta of LeisureByte praised the film's atmosphere, cinematography, and the memorable twist ending of the Netflix version but disliked the slow plot progression during the first half and the liberal use of jump scares.
