= Lance Carr (actor) =

Filipino actor (born 2000)

- Born: Lance Justin Nazario Carr; October 22, 2000 (age 25); Davao City, Philippines
- Occupation: Actor
- Years active: 2018–present
- Agent(s): Star Magic (2018–2025); Viva Artists Agency (2025–present)

Lance Justin Nazario Carr (born October 22, 2000) is a Filipino actor and former basketball player. He first came to prominence in 2018 to 2019 as a teen housemate on the reality competition program Pinoy Big Brother: Otso. He portrayed small roles in ABS-CBN television shows until signing a contract with Viva Artists Agency in 2025. That year, he starred as Clyden Ramirez, his first lead role, in the romance series Avenues of the Diamond and appeared in the romance film Minamahal: Isang Daang Bulaklak Para Kay Luna. He portrays Raze Silvenia on the mystery horror program Hell University and will next star in the horror film Rosario.

== Early life ==
Lance Justin Nazario Carr was born on October 22, 2000 in Davao City, Philippines. He was a basketball player at the Ateneo de Davao University (AdDU). In 2023, he graduated cum laude from AdDU with a Bachelor of Arts in Communication.

== Career ==
In November 2018, he joined the reality competition program Pinoy Big Brother: Otso as a teen "housemate" (contestant). He was eliminated from the show in May 2019.

Carr subsequently performed small roles in ABS-CBN programs like Bawal Lumabas and Dirty Linen for six years. In 2022, he portrayed Billy in the coming-of-age comedy series Beach Bros. He considered quitting acting, believing his career would not go anywhere and finding it difficult to juggle school with showbiz.

In 2025, Carr signed with Viva Artists Agency. In February that year, he was cast as Clyden Ramirez, the male lead of the romance series Avenues of the Diamond, the fourth installment of Viva's University Series (shows based on romance novels by Filipino author Gwy Saludes). The character is a medical student and the love interest of Samantha Vera (Aubrey Caraan).

The casting reportedly garnered mixed to negative responses on social media. It was his first lead role. On April 11, Diamond premiered on the streaming service Viva One. Carissa Alcantara of the Manila Bulletin said that Carr's performance in the show was successful even though some of the backlash persisted, opining that it established him as potentially one of his generation's "important" Filipino actors. The Manila Standard also listed Diamond as one of 2025's top Filipino programs.

Later that year, Carr was cast as Eugene in Minamahal: Isang Daang Bulaklak Para Kay Luna, a romance film starring Ashtine Olviga and Andres Muhlach.

In 2026, he portrayed Raze Silvenia in the mystery horror series Hell University. He will next appear in the horror film Rosario.

== Filmography ==
Key
†	Denotes films that have not yet been released

=== Television ===
Year	Title	Role	Notes
2018–2019	Pinoy Big Brother: Otso	Himself	Housemate (contestant)
2020	Bawal Lumabas: The Series	Lance	
2020	In Between	Makisig de Jesus	
2022	The Iron Heart	Jason dela Torre	
2022	Beach Bros	Billy	
2023	Dirty Linen	Matt Villanueva	
2023	High Street (season two of Senior High)	Paolo	
2023	Drag You and Me		Cameo
2025	Avenues of the Diamond	Clyden Ramirez	Lead role
2025	Golden Scenery of Tomorrow	Clyden Ramirez	
2026	Hell University	Raze Silvenia	

=== Film ===
Year	Title	Role	Notes
2025	Minamahal: 100 Bulaklak Para Kay Luna	Eugene	
2026	Rosario †	Caleb	
