= Nokturno =

2024 folk horror film by Mikhail Red

- Promotional release poster
- Directed by: Mikhail Red
- Written by: Rae Red; Nikolas Red
- Produced by: Mikhail Red
- Starring: Nadine Lustre
- Edited by: Nikolas Red
- Music by: Paul Sigua; Myka Magsaysay-Sigua
- Production companies: Metro-Goldwyn-Mayer; Evolve Studios; Viva Films; Studio Viva
- Distributed by: Viva Films
- Release date: October 31, 2024
- Running time: 99 minutes
- Country: Philippines
- Language: Filipino

Nokturno (transl. Nocturne) is a 2024 Philippine folk horror film directed by Mikhail Red and co-lwritten by Rae Red. It stars Nadine Lustre. The film released on October 31, 2024 on Amazon Prime Video.

== Plot ==
After Jaime's younger sister, Joana, seemingly dies by suicide, Jaime returns to her hometown, San Sebastian. She is picked up at the port by her Uncle Jun, who tells Jaime that Joana is believed to have committed suicide. However, Jun believes Joana's boyfriend, Manu, played a role in her death. Jun drops Jaime off at Joana's wake and implores Jaime to be kind to her mother, Lilet, who struggles with paranoia revolving around the Kumakatok, a trio of malevolent spirits that knock on people's doors, driving those who answer to suicide after three days.

Jaime comforts her younger brother, Julius, who says that the Kumakatok took Joana, but Jaime insists that he is being fed Lilet's delusions. Lilet argues with Jaime over the circumstances surrounding Jaime's death, blaming her husband's death on the Kumakatok. Manu arrives at the wake, but is kicked out. He tells Jaime that he also believes the Kumakatok killed Joana, and expresses fear that he is next before leaving. Later, Jaime mourns Joana, feeling guilty for ignoring her sister's pleas for help. The next day, Jaime tells Julius that she is returning to Manila soon and invites him to come with her. Manu visits Jaime to ask if Joana looked peaceful in her casket, but panics at hearing knocking from Joana's grave.

Jaime wakes from a nightmare and sees a woman in a bloody gown in the corner of her room. Before Jaime and Julius leave for Manila, Lilet tells Jaime that everything she did was to keep the family together. Jaime takes Julius to the hotel where Joana died. When he asks how their father died, Jaime replies that he had also committed suicide, and that it was the beginning of Lilet's obsession with the Kumakatok. The two argue about Jaime's disbelief, and later that night, Jaime answers the knocking at the door. She follows a trail of blood to the room where Joana died and finds Manu in the bathroom.

Manu tells Jaime that he answered the Kumakatok's knocking and has been plagued with visions since. The next morning, Jaime and Manu awaken to Julius missing, and they find him back at Lilet's house. Lilet refuses to let Jaime in, saying that she had forsaken them. Jaime tells Manu about the incident in the hotel room, which panics Manu, and he runs off. She follows him into a house, where she watches as he commits suicide by slamming his head into a wall. Afterward, Jun takes Jaime to Lorna's grave and reveals that he was cursed by the Kumakatok while investigating her father's death. However, he was able to survive after Lorna gave her life for his. He offers Jaime the chance to let him take her place, which she refuses.

Back in the hotel room, Jaime sees the gowned woman and is attacked by the Kumakatok. She returns home, and Julius tells her that Lilet went to the hospital. They are attacked again but are saved by Jun. Lilet goes to Jun's house, and Jaime apologizes for not believing her. They reconcile, and Lilet tells Jaime a story about how American soldiers in World War II killed the nuns who housed them in their dormitories. Jaime dreams about the dormitory and goes to investigate. There, she finds Lilet, and the Kumakatok attacks them. Lilet sacrifices herself to save Jaime.

After Lilet's funeral, Julius hears knocking at his window. Meanwhile, Jaime receives a phone call from Lilet warning her not to open the door. She finds Lilet's casket is empty and opens the door, and the Kumakatok possess her.

== Cast ==
- Nadine Lustre as Jamie

A strong and resilient overseas worker in Dubai. She has distanced herself from her hometown of San Sebastian due to a traumatic past and her mother's mental instability.

- Eula Valdez as Lilet

A devastated widow due to the loss of her husband who believes that a curse is haunting their family.

- Bea Binene as Joana

An ambitious younger sister of Jamie who planned to leave their small, conservative town together with her boyfriend Manu as she has grown indifferent to her mother.

- Wilbert Ross as Manu

A man who's on the brink of insanity after witnessing her girlfriend's death.

- Ku Aquino as Tito Jun

A caring and protective barangay captain and brother of Lilet.

- JJ Quilantang as Julius

Jamie's younger brother who witnessed the disintegration of his family, and deals with his trauma by withdrawing into his peculiar hobby of insect collecting.

== Production ==
=== Development ===
The film is written by Rae Red and directed by Mikhail Red. Nokturno is Red and Lustre second collaboration after having worked together on the hit techno-horror film Deleter (2022).

=== Casting ===
In February 2023, it was reported that Nadine Lustre would be taking on the lead role with director Mikhail Red's new upcoming film, Nokturno. As the film gears up for production, it was further announced on August 7, 2023, that Lustre would be joined by another cast, including Bea Binene, Wilbert Ross and seasoned actress Eula Valdez.

== Reception ==
The film received a review score of 40/100 from 8 reviews according to review aggregator website Kritikultura, indicating a generally negative reception.
