= Hell University =

Philippine television series

- Official poster
- Genre: Mystery; Thriller; Horror
- Based on: Hell University by KnightInBlack
- Directed by: Bobby Bonifacio Jr.
- Starring: Heart Ryan; Zeke Polina; Lance Carr; Aubrey Caraan
- Country of origin: Philippines
- Original languages: Filipino; English
- No. of episodes: 18

Production
- Executive producer: Vicente "Boss Vic" Del Rosario Jr.
- Production companies: Studio Viva; Webtoon Productions

Original release
- Network: Viva One
- Release: February 6 – June 5, 2026

Hell University is a Philippine mystery thriller television series with elements of romance and dark academia. The show is an adaptation of the Wattpad novel of the same name, which was inspired by the dystopian horror film series The Purge and written by KnightInBlack.

The series is directed by Bobby Bonifacio Jr. and co-produced by Studio Viva and Webtoon Productions. It stars Heart Ryan as Zein Shion and Zeke Polina as Ace Craige. The cast also includes Lance Carr, Aubrey Caraan, Andre Yllana, Jastine Lim, Derick Ong, Jac Abellana, Gabbi Ejercito, Andrea Del Rosario, Ashanti Gorospe, Jao Canlas, Bree Barrameda, Keagan de Jesus, Jemima Rivera, Alas Alvarez, and Rafa Victorino.

The series was originally scheduled to premiere on the streaming platform Viva One on January 10, 2026. Its first episode premiered on February 6.

== Premise ==
The story takes place in a school called Hell University, which is hidden from society and operates outside of government control. Students at the university do not pay for tuition or food. However, the students must survive a nightly event called the "Bloody Night." This event occurs between 7:00 p.m. and 5:00 a.m., during which all violent acts, including murder, are permitted. A group of friends unknowingly enters the school and becomes students. They must deal with various gangs that control the campus while trying to survive and escape.

== Cast and characters ==
The information below is adapted from a Latest Chika article, unless otherwise stated.

- Heart Ryan as Zein Shion, a brave student who tries to protect her friends. She becomes romantically involved with Ace.
- Zeke Polina as Ace Craige, the "Supremo" or President of the Supreme Student Council. The character is described as a quiet but dangerous leader.
- Lance Carr as Raze Silvenia, the leader of the "Devil God Warrior" gang and the smartest student in the school.
- Aubrey Caraan as Samantha Shion / Allison Shion, a rebellious former student of the university who holds secrets about the school's past.
- Andrea Del Rosario as Madam Violet, the villain
- Andre Yllana as Matthew "Matt" Hart, a friend of Zein's who harbors secret feelings for her.
- Jastine Lim as Vanessa Savagge, a "girly girl" with hidden character depths
- Derick Ong as Davies "Dave" Silver, the emotional pillar of the main group
- Jac Abellana as Jerome Marquez, the jokester
- Gabbi Ejercito as Mia Mendez, a sweet friend of Zein's
- Ashanti Gorospe as Roxane Allister, the popular "mean girl" of Hell University
- Jao Canlas as Onel Ty, Ace's vice president
- Bree Barrameda as Fritzy Saldivar, Ace's secretary
- Keagan de Jesus as Nazzer Lumia, the leader of the "unhinged" Black Blood Gang
- Jemima Rivera as Nicky Colt, another member of the Black Blood Gang and one of the "deadliest" characters
- Alas Alvarez as Luke, a "dangerous" member of the Black Blood Gang
- Rafa Victorino as Angelica

== Production ==
=== Development ===
The series was announced by Viva One during a fan event in August 2025. It is based on the Wattpad novel by KnightInBlack. The book was inspired by the dystopian horror film franchise The Purge. Hell University has been described as a horror series, a supernatural dark academia thriller, and a mystery with an element of romance. It is a co-production between Studio Viva and Webtoon Productions.

=== Filming and release ===
Principal photography started in an abandoned building, which production designer Ericson Navarro and his team renovated with an Art Deco aesthetic to create the school setting. At a media conference, Heart Ryan stated that cleaning up became difficult for the cast due to the remote filming location, but she said she enjoyed the process nonetheless. The series was originally scheduled to premiere on January 10, 2026, but it was moved to February 6. Its teasers were released on January 16 and 20.

=== Casting ===
The cast members were selected through a combination of auditions and direct selection by Viva management. Director Bobby Bonifacio Jr. stated that Viva executive Vicente Del Rosario Jr. saw potential in specific actors for the roles. This project marks the first lead roles for actors Heart Ryan and Zeke Polina. The series also reunites the "LanceBrey" love team of Lance Carr and Aubrey Caraan, who previously appeared in the University Series. The cast also features Andre Yllana, Jastine Lim, Derick Ong, Jac Abellana, Gabbi Ejercito, Andrea Del Rosario, Ashanti Gorospe, Jao Canlas, Bree Barrameda, Keagan de Jesus, Jemima Rivera, Alas Alvarez, and Rafa Victorino.

== Soundtrack ==
The boy band Alamat will have two songs in the Hell University soundtrack: "LuzViMinda", and a cover of Rico Blanco's 2008 song "Yugto" (transl. Stage). Rob Deniel's "Sinta" (transl. Darling) is also a part of the soundtrack.

== Reception ==
Samantha Radaza of the independent magazine Kasing2 gave season one of Hell University a rating of 6.5/10. She criticized the slow pace of the 18 episodes, as well as some technical aspects of the production. However, she praised certain performances, especially Jemima Rivera's, Keagan De Jesus', and Alas Alvarez' in the roles of the Black Blood Gang's original trio. In particular, she described Rivera as the "most consistently thrilling" part of season one and a "revelation".
