= The Rain In España =

Philippine teen drama series

- Genre: Teen; Romantic drama
- Based on: University Series - The Rain in España by Gwy Saludes
- Directed by: Theodore Boborol
- Starring: Heaven Peralejo; Marco Gallo
- Theme music composer: Martin Riggs
- Opening theme: Hanggang Sa Buwan
- Composer: Kean Cipriano
- Country of origin: Philippines
- Original language: Filipino
- No. of episodes: 10 (list of episodes)

Production
- Camera setup: Single-camera
- Running time: 45–50 min
- Production company: Studio Viva

Original release
- Network: Viva One
- Release: May 1 – July 3, 2023

Related
- Safe Skies, Archer; Chasing in the Wild; Avenues of the Diamond

The Rain In España is a Philippine teen romantic drama television series directed by Theodore Boborol that premiered on May 1, 2023, on Viva One. Produced by Studio Viva, an adaptation of the Wattpad novel University Series - The Rain in España by Gwy Saludes. The series stars Heaven Peralejo and Marco Gallo.

== Cast and characters ==
=== Main cast ===
- Heaven Peralejo as Louisse Natasha "Luna" Valeria
- Marco Gallo as Kalix Jace Martinez

=== Supporting cast ===
- Gab Lagman as Sebastian Vincent "Sevi" Camero
- Bea Binene as Avianna Rye "Via" Diaz
- Aubrey Caraan as Samantha Maureen "Sam" Vera
- Nicole Omillo as Kierra Zylene Ynares
- Krissha Viaje as Ashianna Kim "Yanna" Fernandez
- Frost Sandoval as Leo
- Gabby Padilla as Amethyst Alvarez
- Andre Yllana as Adonis
- Francis Magundayao as Miguel Villaflor
- Ruben Maria Soriquez as Jake

== Production ==
The series was developed by Studio Viva for Viva One. It is based on Gwy Saludes first book in the Wattpad novel "University Series" titled "The Rain in España" consisting of ten episodes. The announcement event for the series was held on November 3, 2022. The principal photography of the series commenced in November 2022. The series marks the second collaboration between Marco Gallo and Heaven Peralejo after Pinoy Big Brother: Lucky 7 (2016). The launch event for the series was held on April 19, 2023. Heaven Peralejo and Marco Gallo along with Gab Lagman, Bea Binene, Aubrey Caraan, Nicole Omillo, Krissha Viaje, Frost Sandoval, Gabby Padilla, Andre Yllana, and Francis Magundayao was cast to appear in the series. The trailer of the series was released on April 1, 2023.

== Episodes ==
No.	Title	Original release date
1	"The Architect and the Lawyer"	1 May 2023
2	"Gusto Na Kita"	8 May 2023
3	"A Special Place"	15 May 2023
4	"Best Trip Ever"	22 May 2023
5	"I Love NY"	29 May 2023
6	"Take Yourself to the Moon"	5 June 2023
7	"Restart"	12 June 2023
8	"Luna"	19 June 2023
9	"The Other Side of the Coin"	26 June 2023
10	"It’s Always Been You"	3 July 2023

== Soundtrack ==
The Rain In España

Soundtrack album by Kean Cipriano
- Released: 2023
- Recorded: 2022
- Genre: Romance; Soundtrack
- Language: Filipino
- Label: O/C Records

The Rain In España soundtrack is composed by Kean Cipriano for O&C Records. The first song "Hanggang Sa Buwan" is the theme song of Luna and Kalix sung by Kenaniah.

Tracklisting
No.	Title	Length
1.	"Hanggang Sa Buwan" (Male)	4:13

== Spin-off series ==
A spin-off series title Safe Skies, Archer starring Jerome Ponce and Krissha Viaje was released on November 20, 2023 on Viva One.
