= I Love You Since 1892 =

- Official release poster
- Genre: fantasy, romance-drama
- Based on: I Love You Since 1892 by Mia Alfonso
- Written by: Mia Alfonso
- Directed by: Mac Alejandre
- Starring: Heaven Peralejo; Jerome Ponce; Joseph Marco
- Country of origin: Philippines
- Original language: Filipino
- No. of seasons: 1
- No. of episodes: 18

Production
- Producer: Juan Carlos Magtalas
- Production company: Studio Viva

Original release
- Network: Viva One
- Release: September 5, 2025 – January 2, 2026

I Love You Since 1892 is a Philippine fantasy romantic-drama television series directed by Mac Alejandre and written by Binibining Mia. It stars Heaven Peralejo, Jerome Ponce and Joseph Marco. The story is based on a book series written by Mia Alfonso which is an original Wattapad story in 2016. The series was released on Viva One.

== Synopsis ==
Set in 2016, Carmelita, a young brat student is transported back in the year 1892 through an old diary medium. Taking on the personality of her ancestor, Carmella Isabella. Carmelita has to navigate the complex life of 1892 with a mission of stopping a tragedy and ensuring she will not fall in love with Juanito.

== Cast ==
Main cast

- Heaven Peralejo as Carmelita Montecarlos/Carmella Isabella
- Jerome Ponce as Juanito Alfonso
- Joseph Marco as Leandro Flores

Supporting cast

- Louise delos Reyes as Maria Montecarlos
- Ella Ilano as Teresita Agbayani
- Anna Luna as Josefina Montecarlos
- Christian Vasquez as Don Alejandro Montecarlos
- Maricel Morales as Donya Soledad Montecarlos
- Andrea Del Rosario as Donya Juanita Alfonso
- Soliman Cruz as Don Mariano Alfonso
- Christopher Roxas as Kapitan Vicente Flores
- Ashley Diaz as Sofia Alfonso
- Suzette Ranillo as Madre Olivia

=== Special Participation ===
- Derick Ong as James Gilbert
- Bella Thompson as Shae Mendez
- Arnold Reyes as David Isabella

== Production ==
During the media conference, Heaven Peralejo, Jerome Ponce and Joseph Marco were announced to play the main characters of the book to TV series adaptation on July 24, 2025. Mac Alejandre is assigned to direct the television series. Peralejo revealed that "she did a research on the duality of her character and read the Wattapad novel several times".

Studio Viva acquired the rights of I Love You Since 1892 from book to television series adaptation which they also served as the producer.

== Soundtrack ==
Viva Records released an official soundtrack for the series, including the songs, Ang Awit Natin, originally sung by Janine Teñoso and covered by Heaven Peralejo, and Tahimik na Buhay by Janine Teñoso.

== Episodes ==
Episode list
No.	Title	Original air date
1	Carmela	September 5, 2025
2	Hello, 1892	September 12, 2025
3	Ligaw Tingin	September 19, 2025
4	Puno ng Mangga	September 26, 2025
5	Itigil ang Kasal	October 3, 2025
6	Tampuhan sa Harana	October 6, 2025
7	Cariñosa	October 17, 2025
8	Isinulat ng Tala	October 24, 2025
9	Sindi ng Kandila	October 31, 2025
10	Asul na Sobre	November 7, 2025
11	Marka ng Ekis	November 14, 2025
12	Kabanata	November 21, 2025
13	Alamat ng Alitaptap	November 28, 2025
14	Pulang Rosas	December 5, 2025
15	Kasal sa Simbahan	December 12, 2025
16	Ang mga Rebelde	December 19, 2025
17	Ang Huling Tibok	December 25, 2025
18	Lo Siento, Te Amo	January 2, 2026

== Novel adaptation ==
I Love You Since 1892 is an original Wattpad novel series written by Mia Alfonso or known as Binibining Mia released in 2016. Due to its popularity, the Wattapad series was adapted into book series and was published under ABS-CBN books in 2019. The I Love You Since 1892 book series, actors Janella Salvador and Marlo Mortel played the main characters as Carmella and Juanito and their faces were printed on the book covers. The book was sold for over 210,000 copies and named as the 2019 Book of the Year.
