= Di Na Muli =

Philippine drama series

- Title poster
- Genre: Romantic drama
- Directed by: Andoy Ranay
- Starring: Julia Barretto; Marco Gumabao; Marco Gallo
- Country of origin: Philippines
- Original language: Filipino
- No. of episodes: 14

Production
- Executive producers: Vic del Rosario Jr. Robert P. Galang; Ray C. Espinosa
- Producers: Sienna G. Olaso; Isabel A. Santillan; Vincent del Rosario; Veronique del Rosario-Corpus; Valerie S. del Rosario
- Camera setup: Multi-camera
- Running time: 60 minutes
- Production companies: Viva Television; Cignal Entertainment

Original release
- Network: TV5
- Release: September 18 – December 18, 2021

Di Na Muli (Never Again) is a Philippine romantic drama television series broadcast by TV5. Directed by Andoy Ranay, it stars Julia Barretto, Marco Gumabao and Marco Gallo. It aired on the network's TodoMax Weekend line up from September 18 to December 18, 2021, replacing The Wall Philippines.

The series is streaming online on Vivamax.

== Plot ==
The story of love and moving forward in life without regrets is told through the eyes of a woman burdened with precognition of specific events in the future.

== Cast and characters ==
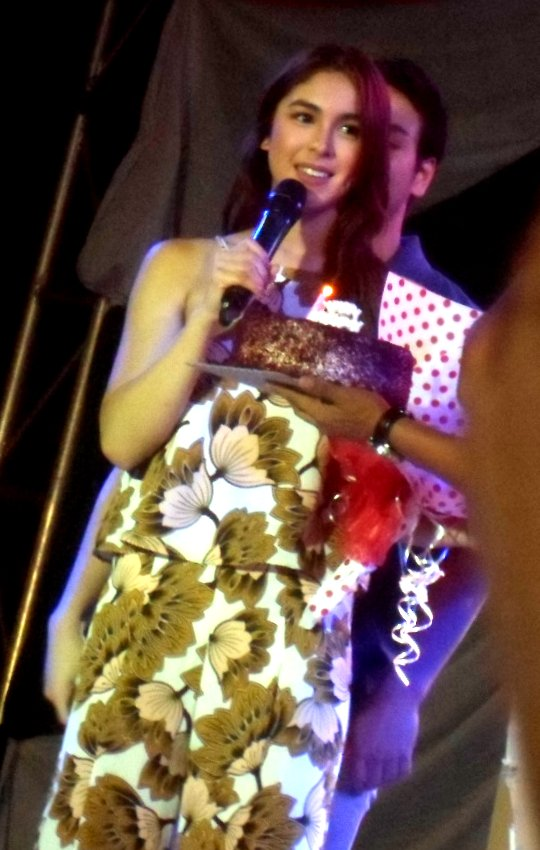
Julia Barretto portrays Yanna

Main cast

- Julia Barretto as Yanna
- Marco Gumabao as Mico
- Marco Gallo as CJ

Supporting cast

- Angelu de Leon as Grace
- Bobby Andrews as Alfred
- Mickey Ferriols as Lucy
- Baron Geisler as Tomas
- Katya Santos as Olive
- Lander Vera-Perez as Henry
- Krissha Viaje as Lauren
- Liz Alindogan as Divine
- Ashley Diaz as Angela
- Andre Yllana as Daryl
- Nicole Omillo as Chelsea

== Episodes ==
No. overall	No. in season	Title	Social media hashtag	Original release date
1	1	"Kapit Lang"	#DiNaMuliKapitLang	September 18, 2021
2	2	"Pagtatagpo"	#DiNaMuliPagtatagpo	September 25, 2021
3	3	"Oras Na"	#DiNaMuliOrasNa	October 2, 2021
4	4	"Bagong Simula"	#DiNaMuliBagongSimula	October 9, 2021
5	5	"Kompetisyon"	#DiNaMuliKompetisyon	October 16, 2021
6	6	"Love Hate"	#DiNaMuliLoveHate	October 23, 2021
7	7	"Hawak Kamay"	#DiNaMuliHawakKamay	October 30, 2021
8	8	"Holding Back"	#DiNaMuliHoldingBack	November 6, 2021
9	9	"Kumplikado"	#DiNaMuliKumplikado	November 13, 2021
10	10	"Pasabog"	#DiNaMuliPasabog	November 20, 2021
11	11	"Tapatan"	#DiNaMuliTapatan	November 27, 2021
12	12	"Wasak"	#DiNaMuliWasak	December 4, 2021
13	13	"Yanig"	#DiNaMuliYanig	December 11, 2021
14	14	"Huling Kapit"	#DiNaMuliHulingKapit	December 18, 2021
