= Pixie (group) =

Filipino girl group

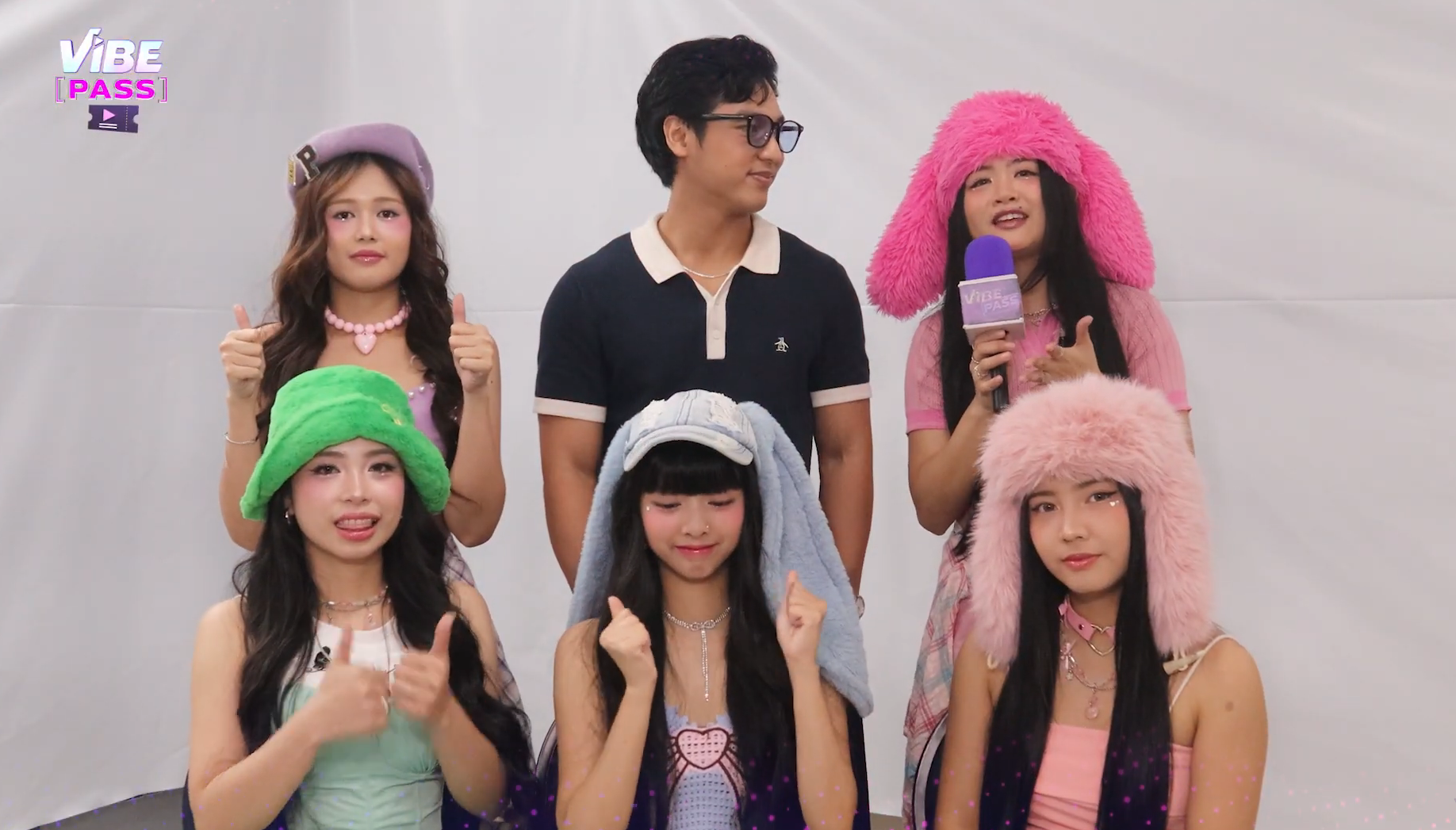
- Pixie in 2026. Left to right: Hana, Mita, Pearl, Nicole, Kath

Background information
- Origin: Philippines
- Genre: P-pop
- Years active: 2024–present
- Labels: Dreamcloud Media Productions; Viva (2024–2026); Sound Manila (2026–present)
- Awards: P-pop Music Awards (2); PMPC Star Awards for Music (1)
- Members: Mita; Pearl; Nicole; Hana; Kath
- Past members: Jane

Pixie, stylized as PIX!E or pix!e, is a Filipino girl group. They were formed on The Girl Group Project, a 2023 documentary series by Dreamcloud Media Productions. In October 2024, they debuted under Dreamcloud and Viva Records with the bubblegum pop single "Iced Coffee". An extended hiatus lasting a year and seven months followed. In June 2026, Pixie released "Float", a track with UK garage beats. They also announced that they had left Viva and moved to Sound Manila, a subsidiary of FlipMusic. In August, they released another single called "Add To Heart". Pixie is said to have a "fairycore" concept, with creative direction by actress and singer Krissha Viaje.

== History ==
=== 2023–present: Formation, debut, and new releases ===
In January 2023, Dreamcloud Media Productions launched The Girl Group Project, an online documentary series following the trainees for an upcoming girl group. Final evaluations took place in July, with a panel including singer and actress Krissha Viaje selected six members among the trainees: Mita, Nicole, Pearl, Jane, Kath, and Hana. They signed with Viva Records in March 2024. In October 2024, they debuted with the name Pixie (stylized as "PIX!E" or "pix!e") with the bubblegum pop single "Iced Coffee". The group name was chosen by Viaje; according to Mita, the exclamation point reflects the members' "playful" energy and the "impact" of each of their skills. She added the group wants to "spread magic" through their music like the mythical creature of the same name. Their concept has been described as "fairycore", with Viaje serving as their creative director.

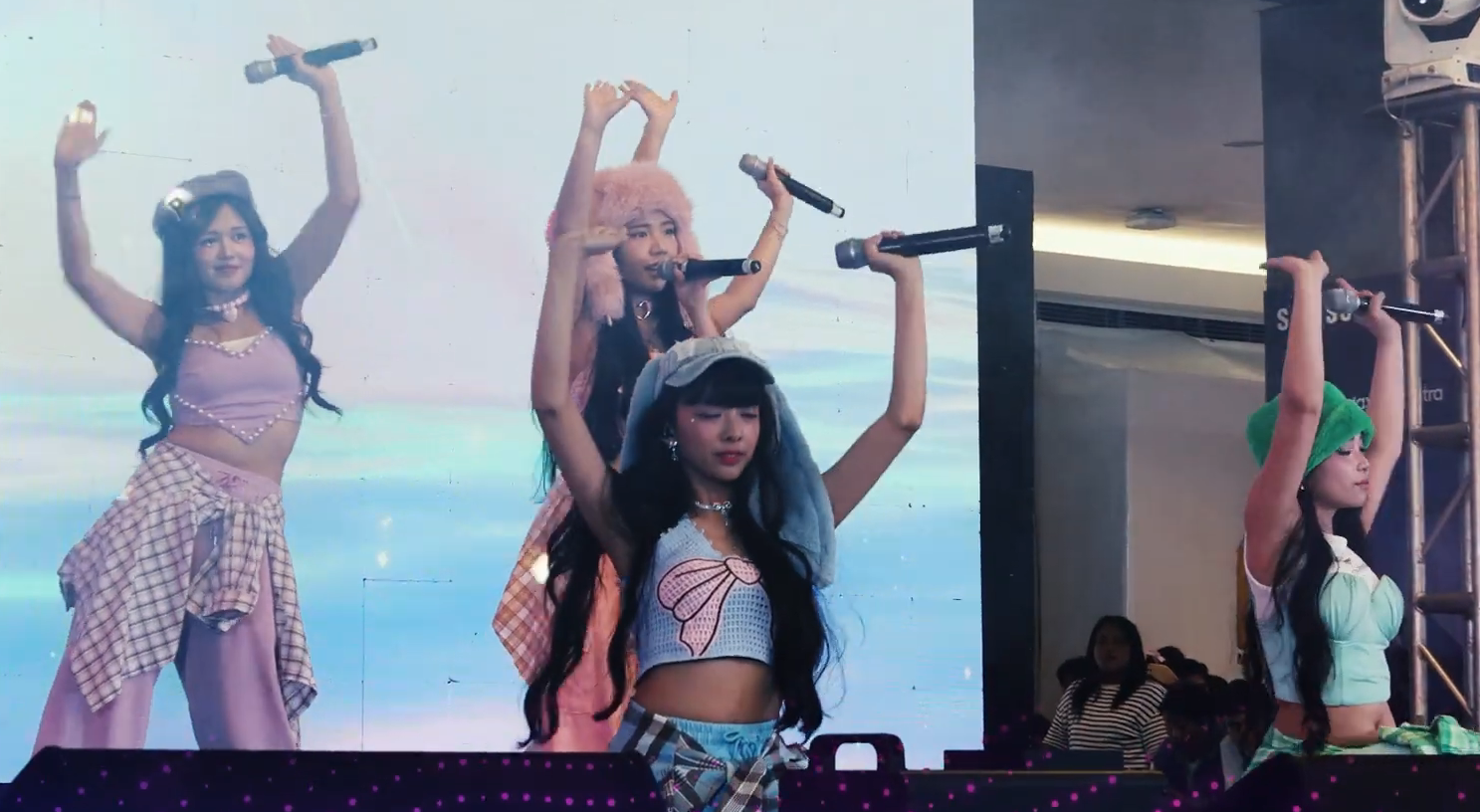
Pixie performing in June 2026

On June 6, 2026, Pixie released the comeback single "Float". Their first release since their one-year-and-seven-month hiatus, "Float" has been described as a hopeful song with "lush" synths and UK garage beats. They had a showcase event at SM City Grand Central on the same day, where they revealed their official fandom name, "Twines." They announced their transfer from Viva to Sound Manila in the same week. On August 8, they released their third single "Add To Heart". The song uses online shopping as a metaphor for romance. It is also their first track with lyrics in three languages: Cebuano (Bisaya), which is member Hana's native language; as well as Tagalog and English.

== Band members ==
Positions are sourced from an article by The Beat Manila.

=== Present ===
- Mita (leader and lead vocalist)
- Pearl (main vocalist)
- Nicole (center)
- Hana (lead rapper)
- Kath (main dancer)

=== Former ===
- Jane (main rapper)

== Discography ==
=== Singles ===
List of singles, showing year released and associated albums
Title	Year	Album	Ref.
"Iced Coffee"	2024	Non-album single	
"Float"	2026	Non-album single	
"Add To Heart"	2026	Non-album single	

== Awards and nominations ==
Award	Year	Category	Nominee(s)	Result	Ref.
P-pop Music Awards	2025	P-pop Female Star of the Night	Pixie	Won	
P-pop Music Awards	2025	P-pop Favorite Fashion Icon of the Year	Nicole of Pixie	Won	
PMPC Star Awards for Music	2026	New Female Group Artist of the Year	"Iced Coffee" by Pixie	Won	
