= My Husband is a Mafia Boss =

Philippine romantic comedy television series

- Genre: Romantic comedy Action; Teen drama
- Directed by: Fifth Solomon
- Starring: Joseph Marco; Rhen Escaño
- Country of origin: Philippines
- Original languages: Filipino; English
- No. of episodes: 21

Production
- Camera setup: Single-camera
- Running time: 61 minutes
- Production company: Studio Viva

Original release
- Network: Viva One
- Release: April 11- – August 29, 2026

My Husband is a Mafia Boss is a Philippine romantic comedy television series directed by Fifth Solomon. It is based on the Wattpad title of the same name by the late Diana Marie Maranan, also known by her pseudonym Yanalovesyouu. It stars Joseph Marco and Rhen Escaño in the lead roles. It premiered on April 11, 2026, on Viva One.

== Plot ==
The story follows Aemie Romero (portrayed by Rhen Escaño), a naive, clumsy, and cheerful ordinary girl whose peaceful life takes an unexpected turn after she is forced into a marriage with Ezekiel Roswell (portrayed by Joseph Marco), a ruthless, wealthy, and stoic mafia boss feared by many. Coming from completely different worlds, the two struggle to adjust to each other's personalities and the dangerous life that now surrounds them.

As Aemie is pulled deeper into Ezekiel's world of power, crime, and secrets, they are forced to face countless challenges together, including family rivalries, betrayal, and threats from enemies who want to tear them apart. Despite their constant misunderstandings and contrasting personalities, the two slowly begin to develop feelings for one another, discovering comfort and trust in the most unexpected place.

== Cast ==
=== Main cast ===
- Joseph Marco as Ezekiel Roswell "Zeke"
- Rhen Escaño as Aemie Ferrer-Roswell (née Romero)

=== Supporting cast ===
- Ara Mina as Alyana Heartily-Ferrer (née Heartily)
- Simon Ibarra as Eiji Ferrer
- Priscilla Meirelles as Violet Swansea
- Frost Sandoval as Kaizer Maxwell Lamperouge
- Sara Joe as Amesyl Cross
- Jaime Yllana as Nico Jeisz Young
- Icee Estrada as Caileigh Ferrer
- Dann Aquino as Louie Birkins
- Aaliyah Coco as Shan Venice Birkins
- Kyosu Guinto as Kevin Alferez
- R-Ji Lim as Jacob Lee
- PJ Rosario as Sebastian Lerwick
- Maru Delgado as Vash Boulstridge
- Roberta Angela Tamondong as Meisha Maxine Lamperouge
- Hazel Calawod as Cassandra Heather
- Kelley Day as Fiona Stonehurst
- Edsel Santiago as Milka Shinize Boulstridge
- Mo Mitchell as Spade Clifford
- Naz San Juan as Tristan Klein
- Akihiro Blanco as Wallace Martin Lionheart
- Anjo Damiles as Jerson Ken Blood
- Sandex Gavin as Phoenix Strife
- Yuki Sonoda as Fauzia Arcadia
- Bianca Santos as Kate Alonzo

== Episodes ==
| No. | Title | Original release date |
|---|---|---|
| 1 | "The Scholar and the... Driver???" | April 11, 2026 |
College student Aemie Romero is tasked to give a presentation to Roswell Corporation to convince them to invest in her university. While scouting the company, she has a memorable encounter with a mysterious driver.
| 2 | "The Meeting" | April 18, 2026 |
It's the day of Aemie's presentation to Roswell Corporation and she still has to prepare so much. Will she get them to invest in Stonehurst University and keep her scholarship?
| 3 | "Mr. and Mrs. Roswell" | April 25, 2026 |
Zeke and Aemie just got married. And now, Aemie moves into Zeke's mansion. Can Zeke and Aemie just settle into this married life easily?
| 4 | "The Mafia Boss and the Perfect Wife" | May 2, 2026 |
Aemie's cousin and friends learn that she is already married to Zeke. She is intent on being the perfect wife to him. But none of them know that Zeke is actually a mafia boss.
| 5 | "Dodong and the Acting CEO" | May 9, 2026 |
While Aemie is intent on getting Zeke a sweet term of endearment, Zeke is intent on training Aemie as the acting CEO.
| 6 | "The Honeymoon" | May 16, 2026 |
Zeke and Aemie have a misunderstanding. Will they be okay in time for their honeymoon?
| 7 | "The CEO Wears Pink" | May 23, 2026 |
Zeke's away in Hawaii, so Aemie runs Roswell Corporation. A difficult secretary and questionable office redesign complicate matters. Nico's also in trouble.
| 8 | "Missing Funds and You" | May 30, 2026 |
As Aemie looks for the Last Will and Testament, a new problem arises - 200 million have been stolen from the company. At the same time, rival groups have started carrying out their plans.
| 9 | "First Monthsary" | June 6, 2026 |
It's Zeke and Aemie's first monthsary. But, while both are intent on celebrating it, a miscommunication might just leave them sulking at each other.
| 10 | "The Past and the Furious" | June 13, 2026 |
On the drive home from the beach, Zeke and Aemie get into an incident that leaves Zeke wounded. At the same time, Fiona comes back claiming to be Zeke's girlfriend.
| 11 | "I Love You...BBQ?!" | June 20, 2026 |
After the near fatal incident they went through, Aemie now has to deal with her feelings. Is she actually falling in love with Zeke now? But even worse, Fiona starts working with them on their new venture.
| 12 | TBA | June 27, 2026 |
| 13 | TBA | July 4, 2026 |
| 14 | TBA | July 11, 2026 |
| 15 | TBA | July 18, 2026 |
| 16 | TBA | July 25, 2026 |
| 17 | TBA | August 1, 2026 |
| 18 | TBA | August 8, 2026 |
| 19 | TBA | August 15, 2026 |
| 20 | TBA | August 22, 2026 |
| 21 | TBA | August 29, 2026 |

== Production ==
=== Development ===
In August 2025, the series was announced during the Vivarkada: The Ultimate Fancon and Grand Concert.

=== Casting ===
The full cast were revealed on January 9, 2026, with Joseph Marco and Rhen Escaño in the lead roles. Additional cast were Ara Mina, Priscilla Meirelles, Simon Ibarra, Frost Sandoval, Sara Joe, Roberta Tamondong, Hazel Calawod, Alamat members Mo Mitchell and R-Ji Lim, Jaime Yllana, Icee Ejercito, Kyosu Guinto, Dann Aquino, Aaliyah Coco, PJ Rosario, Maru Delgado, Naz San Juan, Bianca Santos, Kelley Day, Yuki Sonoda, Sandex Gavin, Anjo Damiles, Akihiro Blanco, and Edsel Santiago.

== Marketing ==
The official trailer of the series has been released.

== Release ==
The series will premiere on Viva One on April 11, 2026 and consists of 21 episodes.
