= Bad Genius (Philippine TV series) =

Philippine crime thriller television series

- Genre: Crime thriller; Drama
- Based on: Bad Genius (2017)
- Directed by: Derick Cabrido
- Starring: Atasha Muhlach; Jairus Aquino; Gab Lagman; Hyacinth Callado
- Country of origin: Philippines
- Original languages: Filipino; English
- No. of episodes: 13

Original release
- Network: Viva One
- Release: July 17 – October 10, 2025

Related
- Bad Genius (Thailand)

Bad Genius is a Philippine crime thriller television series directed by Derick Cabrido and starring Atasha Muhlach, Jairus Aquino, Gab Lagman, and Hyacinth Callado. It is the Philippine television adaptation of the 2017 Thai film of the same name. It premiered on Viva One on July 17, 2025 with new episodes released every Friday until October 10, 2025.

== Synopsis ==
A top student at Colegio de San Gabriel Possenti exposes the school's exploitation of pupils and retaliates by converting cheat sheets into a business.

== Cast ==
=== Main ===
- Atasha Muhlach as Linette "Lin" Estrella
- Jairus Aquino as Tristan "Bank" Bangkat
- Gab Lagman as Patrick Joseph "Pat" Tioseco
- Hyacinth Callado as Grace Anne Dizon

=== Supporting ===
- Romnick Sarmenta as Vin
- Yayo Aguila as Nona
- Irma Adlawan as Nenita
- Kuya Manzano as Mr. Clarke
- Lander Vera-Perez as Ernest
- Art Acuña as Philip
- Sarah Lahbati as Principal Perez
- Lester Llansang as Fidel
- Gold Aceron as Tony
- Andrea Babierra as Maya
- Keagan De Jesus as Ping
- Ash Jewel as Claire

== Episodes ==
No. in series	Title	Directed by	Written by	Original release date
1	"New Girl"	Derick Cabrido	Pam Miras	July 17, 2025
Lin meets Grace on her first day at Colegio de San Gabriel Possenti, and they hit right away. Lin learns that their teacher has been charging for test leaks when she offers to help her for an impending lengthy exam.
2	"The Wash Boy"	Derick Cabrido	Pam Miras & Carmel Josine Jacomille	July 25, 2025
Until Bank, Lin's main academic adversary, steps in, Lin, Grace, and Pat's cheating scheme is well underway.
3	"The Drama Queen"	Derick Cabrido	Pam Miras & Mariya Lim	August 1, 2025
Grace gets the lead part in the school's theater production with Lin's assistance. A cheat sheet is taken away from a student who is not close to Lin and her "clients" just when everything appears to be going well for them.
4	"The Frog Prince"	Derick Cabrido	Pam Miras & Carmel Josine Jacomille	August 8, 2025
Pat starts to think Grace could be keeping something from him. Bank discovers a side of Lin that might completely alter their relationship, but in the meantime, Lin and Bank's developing friendship begins to blossom into something more.
5	"Things Fall Apart"	Derick Cabrido	Pam Miras & Mariya Lim	August 15, 2025
Lin tries to defend and explain herself after Bank learning of her involvement in the exam-cheating scheme. However, Lin starts to doubt all of her choices after discovering that Grace has deceived her.
6	"Strange Territory"	Derick Cabrido	Pam Miras & Carmel Josine Jacomille	August 22, 2025
Lin is given the chance to transform cheat papers into a lot of money by planning an international standardized test as she attempts to move past the trouble she caused in Possenti.
7	"Down Under"	Derick Cabrido	Pam Miras & Mariya Lim	August 29, 2025
Desperate for money, Bank seeks help from Lin who coincidentally needed someone like Bank to pull off their biggest exam-cheating scheme yet. Bank uncovers a manipulative scheme by Pat that makes him question his decision.
8	"The Test"	Derick Cabrido	Pam Miras & Carmel Josine Jacomille	September 5, 2025
The exam-cheating scheme starts with Bank and Lin sends the answers from Sydney while Pat and Grace anxiously awaits to receive them. In the last section of exam, Bank was caught with the phone.
9	"Once A Cheater"	Derick Cabrido	Pam Miras & Mariya Lim	September 12, 2025
Things seemingly have settled down after the incident in Sydney, until an anonymous whistleblower revealed the cheating scheme that prompted the cancellation of the STIC results. The gang gets together again to pull off another heist.
10	"Pressing Matters"	Derick Cabrido	Pam Miras & Carmel Josine Jacomille	September 19, 2025
Lin reluctantly agreed to help to pull off their NCET cheating scheme. The gang executes to break into a printing firm to steal the national test sample, but things did not go as planned.
11	"Blind Spot"	Derick Cabrido	Pam Miras & Carmel Josine Jacomille	September 26, 2025
Things spiraled out of control, forcing Bank to step up and improvise. Out of desperation, Bank tried to memorize all the answers to the test. However, Lin later found out that Bank was lying.
12	"Breaking Point"	Derick Cabrido	Pam Miras & Carmel Josine Jacomille	October 3, 2025
Bank pushed Pat and Grace to continue with the cheating scheme with the intent to defraud their clients, prompting Lin to report what they have done to the Educational Commission. Everyone now must face consequences.
13	"Beat The System"	Derick Cabrido	Pam Miras	October 10, 2025
Lin, Bank, Pat and Grace learned their lessons and decided to work together in the end to better the system.

== Release ==
=== Streaming ===
The series was made available exclusively on the streaming platform Viva One on July 17, 2025. The series consists of 13 episodes.

=== Television broadcast ===
Bad Genius: The Series premiered on TV5. It was originally intended to premiere on the Primetime Primera evening block, replacing Seducing Drake Palma, on October 6, 2025. However, the TV broadcast was later rescheduled, and the series was premiered on October 18, 2025, as part of the Weekend Trip Saturday afternoon lineup and concluded on April 18, 2026, replacing Ogie Diaz Inspires.
