= Hyacinth Callado =

Filipino actress (born 2003)

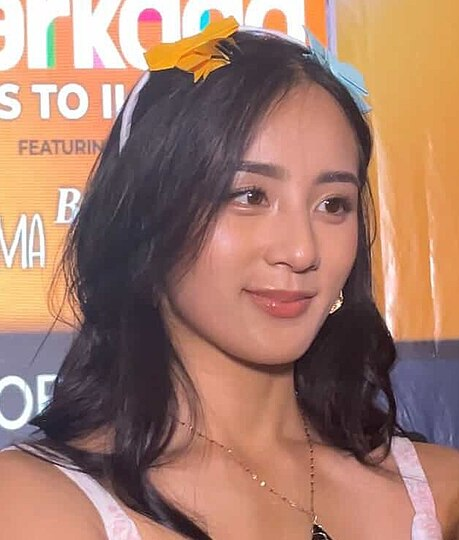
- Callado in 2025
- Born: Hyacinth Callado; October 17, 2003 (age 22); San Francisco, United States
- Occupations: Actress, Singer

Hyacinth Callado (born October 17, 2003) is an American and Filipino actress and singer. Born and raised in the United States, Callado moved to Manila after high school to pursue an acting career. In October 2023, she appeared as Elyse in the romance series Safe Skies, Archer, as well as the music video for the song "RomCom" by Rob Deniel. In 2024, she reprised her role as Elyse in Chasing in the Wild, the sequel to Safe Skies, Archer. In Wild, Elyse became the lead character.

In 2025, Callado starred in another Rob Deniel music video, "Happy Ending". She landed #49 on the TC Candler's Ranking "100 Most Beautiful Faces", and was also announced as a main cast member in the upcoming Filipino adaptation of the 2017 Thai thriller film Bad Genius as Grace in Bad Genius: The Series.

== Early life and education ==
Hyacinth Callado was born on October 17, 2003, in San Francisco, United States. She was raised in the States, but moved to Manila after graduating from high school to pursue an acting career. Her family hails from Bacolod.

== Career ==
In October 2023, Callado appeared as the cheerleader Elyse in Safe Skies, Archer, a six-season adaptation show of Gwy Saludes' University Series romance novels. She also starred in the music video for "RomCom" by Rob Deniel, where the two reenacted a scene from the 2014 romantic comedy film Diary ng Panget (transl. Diary of an Ugly Girl).

In May 2024, Callado starred in the six-part horror miniseries Sem Break. It follows a group of friends who go on vacation during their academic semester break. Their trip takes a "terrifying" turn when they unwittingly attract spirits and bring them home. Callado's character, Jessie, is the most responsible and superstitious member of the group. In September of that year, she played as Amora Elyse Ledezma again but as a lead of University Series adaption series’ third season titled, “Chasing In The Wild”. The story of her character began as an 18 year old cheerleader studying in De La Salle University Manila. She celebrated her birthday for days as she had a debut party after her birthday. She meets an unfamiliar young man during her celebration who she is sure she did not invite but was there. She finds out later that night why was the man able to attend and their story then unfolds.

In 2025, Callado was announced one of the main cast members of Bad Genius, the Filipino adaptation of the 2017 Thai thriller film Bad Genius. She is set to play Grace, a "bubbly, outgoing, and kind" girl who needs high grades to attain the lead role in her school's theater group. The series will premiere on July 17, 2025, on Viva One.

== Advocacy ==
Callado is an advocate for mental health awareness. She has also advocated for Black Lives Matter and Palestine.

== Filmography ==
=== Film ===
Shuvee Etrata's television credits with year of release, film titles and roles
Year	Title	Role	Ref(s).
2023	Hilom	Athena	

=== Television ===
Shuvee Etrata's television credits with year of release, film titles and roles
Year	Title	Role	Ref(s).
2023	Safe Skies, Archer	Amora Elyse Ledezma	
2024	Sem Break	Jessie	
2024	Chasing in the Wild	Amora Elyse Ledezma	
2025	Avenues of the Diamond	Amora Elyse Ledezma	
2025	Bad Genius	Grace Anne L. Dizon	

=== Microdrama ===
Year	Title	Role
2026	OJT Hours of Love	
