= Heaven Peralejo =

Filipino actress (born 1999)

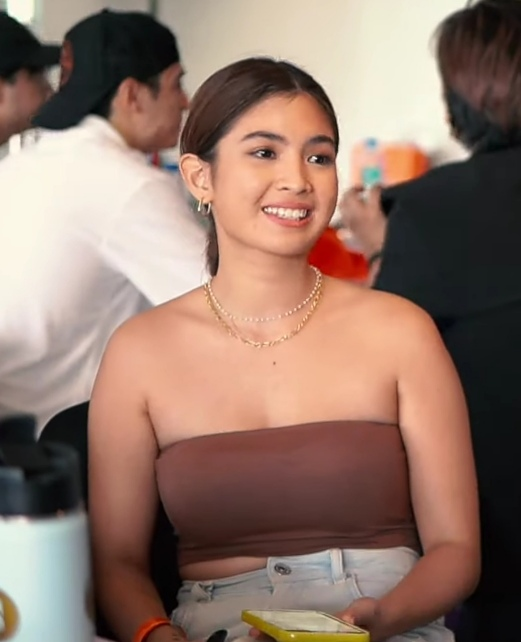
- Peralejo in 2023
- Born: Heaven Lyan Salvador Peralejo; November 25, 1999 (age 26); Makati, Metro Manila, Philippines
- Education: Southville International School affiliated with Foreign Universities (BSBA)
- Occupation: Actress
- Years active: 2009–present
- Agents: Star Magic (2016–2023); Viva Artists Agency (2023–present)
- Height: 5 ft 3 in (160 cm)
- Relatives: Paula Peralejo (aunt); Rica Peralejo (aunt)
- Musical career
- Genres: OPM; pop
- Instruments: Vocals; piano
- Labels: Star Music (2020–2023); Viva Records (2023–present)

YouTube information
- Channel: Heaven Peralejo
- Years active: 2018–present
- Genre: Vlogging
- Subscribers: 529,000
- Views: 20.8 million
- Last updated: June 20, 2025

Heaven Lyan Salvador Peralejo (Tagalog pronunciation: [pɛɾaˈlɛho]; born November 25, 1999) is a Filipino actress. She came to prominence in 2016 through competing in the reality show Pinoy Big Brother: Lucky 7. Following her supporting roles in several television series and films, she received wider recognition for her performance in the 2022 film Nanahimik ang Gabi. Her accolades include a Luna Award, an Asian Academy Creative Award for the national category, and the Jinseo Arigato International Film Festival for Best Actress, as well as nominations from the FAMAS Awards, Metro Manila Film Festival, The EDDYS, PMPC Star Awards for Television and PMPC Star Awards for Movies.

== Early life and education ==
Heaven Lyan Salvador Peralejo was born on November 25, 1999, in Makati, Philippines, to Michael "Myk" Manarang and Shiela Luanne Peralejo. She was originally going to be named "Michaela", which was named after her dad, until it was changed to Heaven by her maternal grandmother, at the time of her birth. Her second name, Lyan, is derived from her mother's name. She was nicknamed Bentot, which was used during her childhood years. She has a younger sibling who lives with her and her mother. She is raised alone by her mother. She is the niece of actresses Rica Peralejo and Paula Peralejo.

She considered her mother as her true love and soulmate. During her stay as a housemate in Pinoy Big Brother: Lucky 7, she voluntarily exited from the show to grant her mother's request to see her before the surgery. Heaven and her mother got a matching tattoos to symbolize their love of traveling.

In November 2023, she graduated from college with a degree in Business Management from Southville International School Affiliated with Foreign Affairs (SISFU).

== Career ==
=== 2009–2016: Beginnings ===
Peralejo's first television appearance was on GMA Network's Lipad Darna Liit in 2009 as Grand Finalist. She then appeared in an Autism Awareness commercial as her first television commercial appearance. Peralejo made a pause in her showbiz career to focus on studying until she was seen once again when she appeared as a guest in 2016 for the TV series Home Sweetie Home as Isay and in 2015 for the movie Buy Now, Die Later as Cesca. On August 6, 2016, Peralejo participated in the Philippine reality show Pinoy Big Brother: Lucky 7, with the moniker "Ang Mommy's Angel ng Makati" where she rose to prominence. She formed a close bond with her fellow teen housemates Marco Gallo and Edward Barber while inside the house. She took a voluntary exit on Day 72 due to her mother's diagnosis and upcoming surgery for cancer.

=== 2017–2021: Breakthrough ===
After her stint in Pinoy Big Brother: Lucky 7, Peralejo had a small role in Maalaala Mo Kaya: Karnabal episode in December 2016, as Ramon's daughter named Caryll. From 2016 to 2019, she has been a semi-regular performer on ASAP. She joined Wansapanataym: Anika Pintasera for 5 episodes as Maxine. Peralejo also played in various Maalaala Mo Kaya episodes entitled Korona in June and Tape Recorder in August. In October, Peralejo was cast in the movie Bes and the Beshies where she played Betchay. She played a supporting role named Daisy Miraflores, the twin sister of Rose "Jasmin" Miraflores, in Wansapanataym: Jasmin's Flower Powers starring Janella Salvador.

In 2018, Peralejo played Diwa in the movie Mama's Girl, one of the friends of Sofia Andres' character. She was cast in her first Ipaglaban Mo episode entitled Hawig where she played Rachel, the niece of Janice De Belen's character. In August, Peralejo played the role of Hershey in the movie Harry and Patty where she worked with Mark Neumann and her PBB co-housemate, Marco Gallo. In the same year, Peralejo starred in Sana Dalawa ang Puso as Sitti, the best friend of Ylona Garcia's character. She went on to play young Cara in the Maalaala Mo Kaya: Fireworks episode in February. She starred in another Ipaglaban Mo: Hadlang episode in September, where she played the girlfriend of the character of McCoy de Leon.

In 2019, Peralejo played Marikit in the film, Familia Blondina, where she worked again with Marco Gallo. She paired up with McCoy de Leon again in the Wansapanataym: Mr. Cutepido for 11 episodes. She starred in Maalaala Mo Kaya: Jacket as AJ, the adoptive daughter of Empoy Marquez and Jennica Garcia. Peralejo later joined the cast of the TV series Pamilya Ko. She also had a small role in the Ipaglaban Mo: Samantala episode as Jillian. After doing guest performances in S.M.A.C. Pinoy Ito for IBC, on its 2nd season, Peralejo was promoted as a series regular for the 3rd season of the show. Peralejo played the teen version of Teresa in Starla, which was Judy Ann Santos-Agoncillo's teleserye comeback. Peralejo idolized Santos and said that it's an honor to play her younger counterpart.

In January 2020, Peralejo starred in a Maalaala Mo Kaya episode entitled Basketball Court opposite Joshua Colet, her first starring episode on the series. Her final episode for the debunked show Ipaglaban Mo! was the Kutob episode, where she played Meann, the granddaughter of the deceased victims, in February of the same year.

In October 2020, Peralejo starred in her first teleserye lead role in the afternoon TV series Bagong Umaga which earned her a Best Actress nomination on PMPC Star Awards for TV. In October of the same year, Peralejo played the role of Sarah on Loving Emily, starring Iza Calzado and Jameson Blake.

In July 2021, Peralejo played the biological daughter of Iza Calzado, who is suffering from mental illness in an episode of Maalaala Mo Kaya entitled Medalya. The episode later won the Asian Academy Creative Award for Best Single Drama/Telemovie/Anthology Episode in 2021. In September of the same year, Peralejo starred opposite Gino Roque on the quarantine-inspired Pasabuy Series which was made available on We TV. In December later that year, she played the role of George in the movie Happy Times opposite Sharlene San Pedro and Ricci Rivero.

=== 2022–present: Acclaim and International Recognition ===
In July 2022, she played the role of Victoria 'Tori' opposite Jameson Blake on the TV Series, A Family Affair

Her acting breakthrough came in her performance in the 2022 Metro Manila Film Festival film, Nanahimik ang Gabi, along with Ian Veneracion and Mon Confiado, for which she scored a Best Actress nomination. She was also nominated Best Actress in the following year's FAMAS Awards and The Eddys. She eventually won her first Best Actress award in the 39th Luna Awards. Peralejo was also named the National Winner for Best Actress in a Leading Role at the 2023 Asian Academy Creative Awards.

In March 2023, she played Daphne in the TV series The Iron Heart. She left Star Magic after six years and signed a management contract with Viva Artists Agency in April.

In May 2023, she reunited with Marco Gallo in the live adaptation of The Rain In España which was part of the University Series and was streamed on Viva One. On August 5, she starred in the first episode of the romance anthology series For The Love entitled Kahit Kailan opposite Marco Gallo, and on August 9, the two of them starred together on their first film titled The Ship Show.

In October, Peralejo joined the cast of Linlang alongside Kim Chiu, Paulo Avelino, JM De Guzman, and Maricel Soriano which was streamed on Amazon Prime Video. In the same month, Peralejo starred in The Fisher with Enchong Dee which premiered at the 36th Tokyo International Film Festival. In November of the same year, Peralejo reprised her character as Luna Valeria on the second season of University Series, titled Safe Skies, Archer, and on the same month, she was named the 2024 calendar girl for the liquor brand, Ginebra.

In April 2024, Peralejo played young Annie on the Philippine adaptation of the South Korean movie Sunny, opposite Vina Morales who played the adult version of her character. In May 2024, Peralejo and Marco Gallo paired up once again in their second movie Men Are From QC, Women Are From Alabang which was a live adaptation of the book written by Stanley Chi. In June 2024, Peralejo starred in the movie Fruitcake alongside an ensemble cast that includes Joshua Garcia, Ria Atayde, Empoy Marquez, Enchong Dee, Jane Oineza and Dominic Ochoa among others. In August of the same year, Peralejo appeared in the Da Pers Family as Keila, a childhood crush of the character of Andres Muhlach, and in the same month, Peralejo reprised her character as Luna Valeria on the third season of University Series, titled Chasing in the Wild.

In November of the same year, Peralejo officially joined the cast of the TV Series Lumuhod Ka Sa Lupa on the second season of the show.

In April 2025, Peralejo reprised her character as Luna Valeria on the fourth season of the University Series, titled Avenues of the Diamond.

In March 2025, Peralejo starred in the horror film titled Lilim. Directed by Mikhael Red, the film premiered internationally on 54th International Film Festival Rotterdam in the Netherlands.

In May 2025, Peralejo won the Best Actress Award on Jinseo Arigato International Film Festival, which was held in Nagoya, Japan for her horror film Lilim. In June 2025, it was announced via Peralejo's official social media accounts that Lilim will also participate in 27th Shanghai International Film Festival and the New York Asian Film Festival 2025.

In June 2025, the film Out of Order will officially join the 3rd Da Nang Asian Film Festival in Vietnam, in which Peralejo stars as one of the leads opposite Alden Richards, who produced and directed the film.

In September 2025, Peralejo played the role of Carmela/Carmelita for the live adaptation of I Love You Since 1892.

In October 2025, Peralejo reprised her character as Luna Valeria on the fifth season of the University Series, titled Golden Scenery of Tomorrow.

In February 2026, Peralejo was awarded as NMD+ Best Supporting Actress for her role in Out of Order.

== Other ventures ==
=== Endorsements ===
In 2024, Peralejo and Marco Gallo became endorsers of BlueWater Day Spa. In 2025, Peralejo, alongside Marco Gallo, became endorsers of Doublemint.

=== Business venture ===
In 2022, Peralejo opened The Food Market, as a business partner in a restaurant business that has branches in BGC and Alabang Westgate.

== Personal life ==
Peralejo was previously in a relationship with Jimuel Pacquiao, who is the son of boxer Manny Pacquiao, in 2019. She also dated actor Kiko Estrada in 2021. Peralejo was in a relationship with her onscreen partner Marco Gallo from 2024 to 2025.

=== Interests ===
In March 2025, Peralejo enrolled in ballet classes. She added that it was her childhood dream to learn ballet lessons.

She is a fitness junkie and filled her morning with exercise routine, workouts, yoga, pilates, kickboxing, Muay Thai. She has also pursued her other interest such as flower arrangement, learning pottery, playing tennis, pickleball and golf, surfing, and reading books.

== Filmography ==
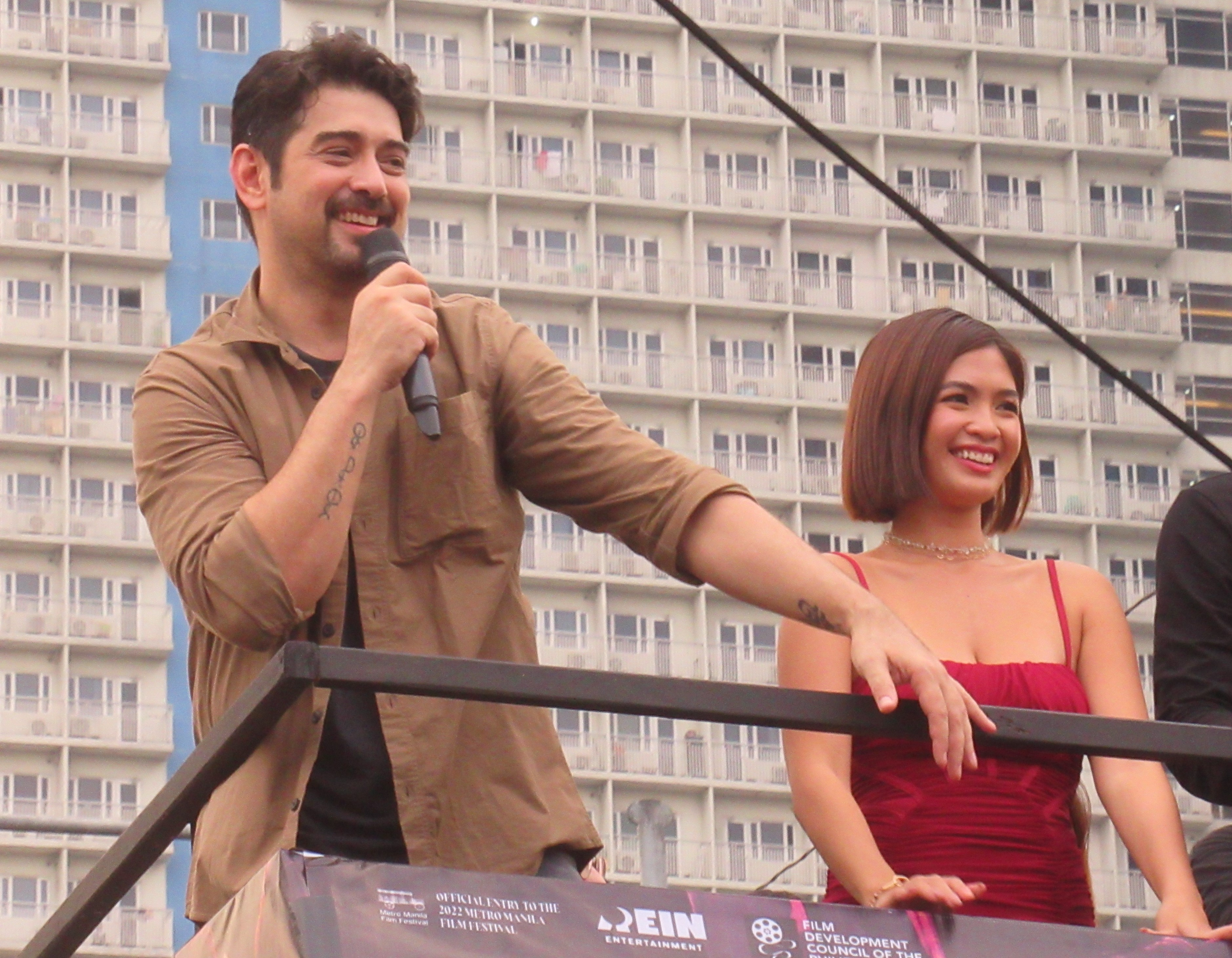
Peralejo (right) in the Nanahimik ang Gabi float

=== Films ===
Year	Title	Role
2015	Buy Now, Die Later	Cesca (segment: "Dinig")
2017	Bes and the Beshies	Betchay
2018	Harry and Patty	Hershey
2018	Mama's Girl	Diwa
2019	Familia Blondina	Marikit Periquit
2021	Happy Times	George Santos
2022	Nanahimik ang Gabi	Me-Ann
2023	The Ship Show	Chia Encarnacion
2024	Sunny	Young Annie
2024	Men Are From QC, Women Are From Alabang	Aica Villanueva
2024	Fruitcake	Diane
2025
2025	Lilim	Issa
2025	Out of Order	Atty. Jennifer Templo
2026	The Fisher	Simone

=== Television ===
Year	Title	Role
2009	Darna Liit	Herself (contestant)
2016	Home Sweetie Home	Isay
2016	On the Wings of Love	Heaven
2016	Pinoy Big Brother: Lucky 7	Herself (housemate)
2016	Maalaala Mo Kaya: Karnabal	Caryll
2016–2023	ASAP	Herself (performer)
2017	Wansapanataym: Annika Pintasera	Maxine
2017	Maalaala Mo Kaya: Korona	Angeline Aguilar
2017	Maalaala Mo Kaya: Tape Recorder	Jackelyn
2017–2018	Wansapanataym: Jasmin's Flower Powers	Daisy Miraflores
2018	Ipaglaban Mo: Hawig	Rachel
2018	FPJ's Ang Probinsyano	Valerie
2018	Sana Dalawa ang Puso	Sitti
2018	Maalaala Mo Kaya: Fireworks	young Kara
2018	Ipaglaban Mo: Hadlang	Rose Baylon
2019	Wansapanataym: Mr. Cutepido	Tina Lopez
2019	Maalaala Mo Kaya: Jacket	AJ
2019	Ipaglaban Mo: Samantala	Jillian
2019	S.M.A.C. Pinoy Ito	Host (performer)
2019	Starla	Teen Teresa
2020	Pamilya Ko	Maria Corrine Patricia "Macopa" de Jesus
2020	Maalaala Mo Kaya: Basketball Court	Kerstein "Tein" Ramos
2020	Ipaglaban Mo: Kutob	Meann
2020–2021	Bagong Umaga	Joanna "Tisay" Magbanua / Joanna Veradona
2021	Maalaala Mo Kaya: Medalya	Julie Elijay
2022	A Family Affair	Victoria "Tori" Simbulan
2022	Maalaala Mo Kaya: Cake	Rowena Nanquil-Gregorio
2023	The Iron Heart	Daphne
2023	The Rain In España	Louisse Natasha "Luna" Valeria
2023	For The Love: Kahit Kailan	Jian
2023	Linlang	Olivia Castillo-Lualhati
2023–2024	Safe Skies, Archer	Louisse Natasha "Luna" Valeria
2024	Chasing in the Wild	Louisse Natasha "Luna" Valeria
2024	Da Pers Family	Keila
2024–2025	Lumuhod Ka Sa Lupa	Hope Soldado
2025	Avenues of the Diamond	Louisse Natasha "Luna" Valeria
2025	I Love You Since 1892	Carmela Isabella / Carmelita Montecarlos
2025–2026	Golden Scenery of Tomorrow	Louisse Natasha "Luna" Valeria
2026–present	Our Yesterday's Escape	Louisse Natasha "Luna" Valeria

=== Digital ===
Year	Title	Role
2020	Loving Emily	Sarah
2021	Pasabuy	Anne Masinop

=== Other media ===
Year	Music Video	Artist
2022	Kung Ako Ang Pumiling Tapusin Ito	Sponge Cola
2022	Kundiman	Rob Deniel
2022	Ilusyon	Kimpoy Feliciano
2023	Mata sa Mata	7th

== Discography ==
=== Singles ===
Year	Track	Album	Details	Ref.
2020	"Nahulog Na Puso"	Non-album single	Words and Music by: Dan Tanedo; Mixed, Mastered and Arranged by: Dante Tanedo; Vocal Supervision and Produced by: Rox B. Santos & Timothy Recla; Published by: Star Songs	
2020	"Ikaw Pala"	Bagong Umaga OST	Words and Music by: Trisha Denise; Mixed, Mastered and Arranged by: Dante Tanedo; Vocal Supervision and Produced by: Rox B. Santos & Timothy Recla; Published by: Star Songs	
2021	"Paano"	Non-album single	Words and Music by: Nica Del Rosario; Mixed, Mastered and Arranged by: Dante Tanedo; Vocal Supervision and Produced by: Rox B. Santos & Timothy Recla; Published by: Star Songs	
2025	"Ang Awit Natin"	I Love You Since 1892 OST	Words and Music by: Jazz Nicolas and Wally Acolola; Mixed, Mastered and Arranged by: Jean-Paul Verona and Migz Haleco; Vocal Supervision and Produced by: Jean-Paul Verona; Published by: Viva Records	

== Awards and nominations ==
Year	Organization	Category	Work	Result
2026	NDM+ Award	Best Supporting Actress	Out of Order	Won
2025	Jinseo Arigato International Film Festival	Best Actress in a Horror/Thriller Category	Lilim	Won
2023	Asian Academy Creative Awards	Best Actress in a Leading Role (National Winner)	Nanahimik ang Gabi	Won
2023	39th Luna Awards	Best Actress in a Leading Role	Nanahimik ang Gabi	Won
2023	2023 FAMAS Awards	Best Actress	Nanahimik ang Gabi	Nominated
2023	2023 Entertainment Editors' Choice Awards	Best Actress	Nanahimik ang Gabi	Nominated
2023	35th PMPC Star Awards for TV	Best Drama Actress	Bagong Umaga	Nominated
2022	2022 Metro Manila Film Festival Gabi ng Parangal	Best Actress	Nanahimik ang Gabi	Nominated
2019	35th PMPC Star Awards for Movies	New Movie Actress of the Year	Harry and Patty	Nominated
2018	32nd PMPC Star Awards for TV	Best New Female TV Personality	Wansapanataym: Jasmin's Flower Powers	Won
