= Filipino Indonesian =

Filipino Indonesian or Indonesian Filipino may be:

- Of or relating to Indonesia–Philippines relations
- Filipinos in Indonesia
- Indonesians in the Philippines
