= Krissha Viaje =

Filipino singer, actress and dancer (born 1992)

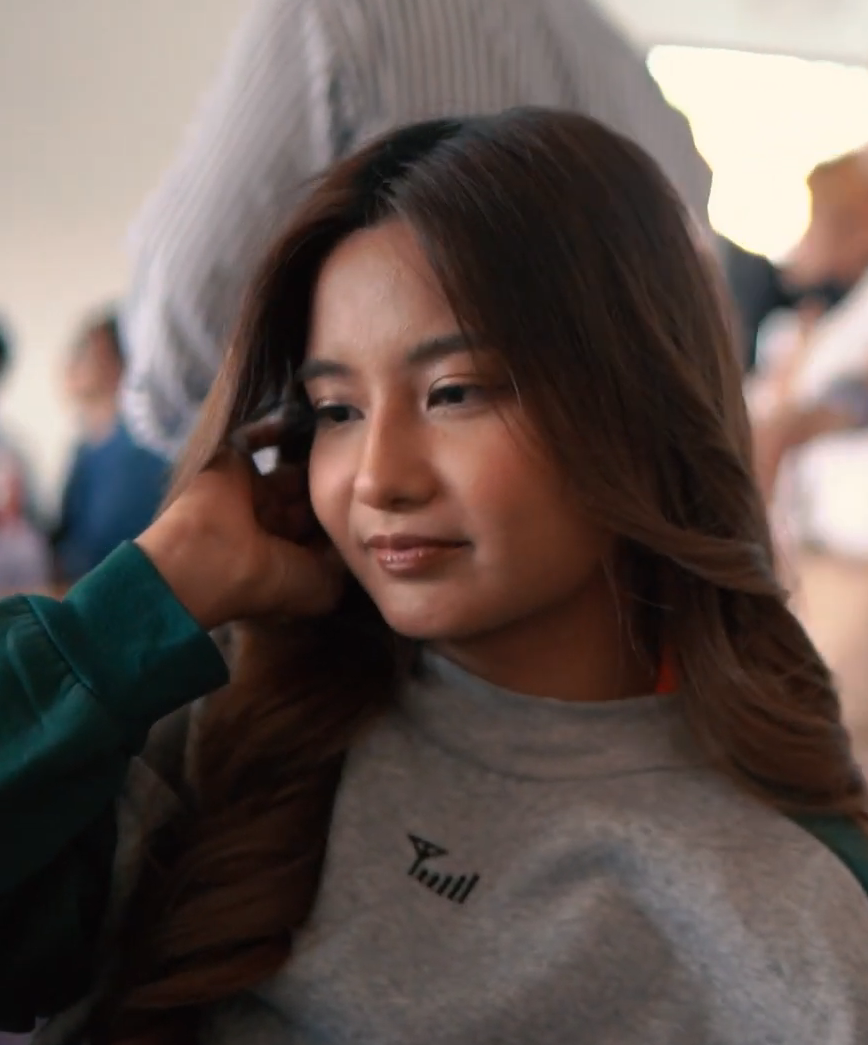
- Viaje in 2023
- Born: Maria Krisshajene Frances Z. Viaje; October 12, 1992 (age 33); Pasig City, Metro Manila, Philippines
- Occupations: Singer; dancer; actress
- Years active: 2006–present
- Musical career
- Genre: pop
- Labels: Star Music (2016–2020); Viva Artists Agency (2020–present)
- Formerly of: Girltrends

YouTube information
- Channel: Krissha Viaje
- Genres: Music; vlogging; Dancing
- Subscribers: 237 thousand
- Views: 17.8 million
- Last updated: October 20, 2025

Maria Krisshajene Frances Z. Viaje (born on October 12, 1992), also known as Krissha Viaje, is a Filipino dancer, host, singer and actress. She was introduced as one of the members of the all-girl dance group, Girltrends on the ABS-CBN variety show It's Showtime. She started her career in 2006 competing on the 2nd season of the reality singing competition Little Big Star. She is the creative director of the P-pop idol girl group Pixie.

== Career ==
=== 2006: Little Big Star ===
In 2006, Krissha Viaje competed in the second season of the reality singing competition Little Big Star, where she finished as the runner-up. In 2015, she signed with Universal Music Japan and released the album "In Love?" expanding her reach to international audiences.

=== 2017: GirlTrends, Nippon TV's "I Can Sing in Japanese" ===
In February 2017, she was launched as part of the pop group GirlTrends that performs regularly on the ABS-CBN noontime show “It’s Showtime".

In 2017, Viaje represented the Philippines and Asia in Nippon TV's "I Can Sing in Japanese," a contest for non-Japanese singers held in Tokyo.

=== 2019: Tawag Ng Tanghalan ===
In 2019, Viaje appeared on Tawag ng Tanghalan — competing as a celebrity contender on the program's Celebrity Champions segment of It's Showtime. She performed renditions such as “Shallow” (originally by Lady Gaga & Bradley Cooper), showcasing her vocal range and stage presence during the televised segment.

=== 2019: Idol Philippines ===
In 2019, Viaje joined the inaugural season of Idol Philippines, the Philippine adaptation of the global Idol franchise aired on ABS-CBN. She auditioned with a rendition of “'Di Na Muli” by Itchyworms and advanced to the Theater Rounds, where she performed “Try” as part of the all-girl group 3GH. Viaje later proceeded to the Do or Die round before being eliminated prior to the Top 20 selection. Her participation in the competition marked her return to ABS-CBN's talent programs following her stint as a member of GirlTrends on It's Showtime.

=== 2023–present ===
In 2023, she appeared in the romantic-comedy series The Rain in España, adapted from the first Wattpad novel in Gwy Saludes’ University Series. Later that year, she played a lead role in "Safe Skies, Archer", the second installment of the series, and co-starred in the fourth installment, "Avenues of the Diamond". On September 13, 2025, Viaje began appearing alongside Jerome Ponce in "Para sa Isa’t Isa", followed by the fifth installment of the University Series, "Golden Scenery of Tomorrow", which premiered on October 18, 2025.

== Personal life ==
Krissha Viaje began pursuing a career in music at the age of 12, when she joined Little Big Star Season 2 and finished in second place. In 2017, she debuted as a member of the pop group GirlTrends. That same year, she represented the Philippines in Nippon TV’s "I Can Sing in Japanese", a singing contest for non-Japanese performers held in Tokyo.

In 2018, she was part of Team Philippine All-Stars, which won the top prize at Japan’s Nodojiman: The World competition.

== Discography ==
=== Singles ===
List of singles showing year released and album name
Title	Year	Album	Ref.
"Di Ko Pa Alam"	2021	Non-Album Single	
"Payapang Alapaap"	2023	Safe Skies Archer OST	
Collaboration
"Te Amo" Ella Cruz • JeanKiley	2022	Non-Album Single	

=== Album ===
List of extended plays with selected details
Title	Album Details
in love?	Released: November 18, 2015; Label: Universal Music LLC; Format: digital download, streaming; Track listing: 1. "Last Love"; 2. "愛唄"; 3. "ベイビー・アイラヴユー"; 4. "スターラブレイション"; 5. "おかえり"; 6. "この夜を止めてよ"; 7. "Butterfly"; 8. "あったかいんだからぁ♪"; 9. "Precious"; 10. "Don't You Remember"
Girl's Summer	Released: August 17, 2016; Label: Universal Music LLC; Format: digital download, streaming; Track listing: 1. "Can't Stop (E demais)"; 2. "Sunshine"; 3. "ShooShakaLooLove"; 4. "Summer Breeze"; 5. "Sing About Love"; 6. "Over You"; 7. "Coming Back To Me"; 8. "ShooShakaLooLove - Japanese Version"

== Songwriting credits ==
- "Iced Coffee" – Pixie (co-producer)

== Filmography ==
=== Television ===
Year	Program	Role	Ref.
2012	Unos	Jocelyn	
2012	Kapitan Awesome	Krissha Lala	
2013	Ama Namin	young Vanessa	
2017 –2020	It's Showtime	Herself / GT Member-Performer and Co-Host	
2020	Maalala Mo Kaya: Posas	Karen's Sister	
2021	Parang Kayo Pero Hindi	Bree	
2023	The Rain In España	Ashianna "Yanna" Kim Fernandez	
2023	For The Love: Ang Pag-ibig	Lexi	
2023	Safe Skies Archer	Ashianna "Yanna" Kim Fernandez	
2024	Chasing in the Wild	Ashianna "Yanna" Kim Fernandez	
2024	Sem Break	Mich	
2025	Avenues Of The Diamond	Ashianna "Yanna" Kim Fernandez	
2025	Para sa Isa't Isa	Erin Revina	
2025	Golden Scenery of Tomorrow	Ashianna "Yanna" Kim Fernandez	
2025	Mga Batang Riles	Missy Cuevas	

=== Film ===
Year	Title	Role	Notes	Ref.
2012	Unos			
2022	Greed	Nori		
2023	Marry Cherry Chua	Lena		
2026	Wonderful Nightmare	Atty. Ayel		
2026	Life After You	Stacey		

=== Microdrama ===
Year	Program	Role
2026	Love in Commute	Joy
2026	The CEO's New Jowa	Grace Bautista

== Concerts ==
Headlining concerts
Year	Title	Details	Notes	Ref.
2024	ME: A Birthday Concert For A Cause	Date: October 12, 2024; Venue: Carlos P. Romulo Auditorium RCBC Plaza, Makati		

Co-headlining concerts
Year	Title	Co-headliner	Details	Notes	Ref.
2025	Vivarkada: The Ultimate Fancon and Grand Concert	VIVA/VIVARKADA ARTIST	Date: AUGUST 15, 2025; Venue: Araneta Coliseum		

== Awards and nominations ==
Name of the award ceremony, year presented, award category, nominee(s) of the award, and the result of the nomination
Award ceremony	Year	Category	Recipient(s) and nominee(s)	Result	Ref.
Seoul International Drama Awards	2024	Outstanding Asian Awards	Herself, Safe Skies Archer	Nominated	
10th Platinum Stallion National Media Awards	2025	Trinitian Media Practitioner for Television	Krissha	Won	
