= Aubrey Caraan =

Filipino actress and singer (born 1998)

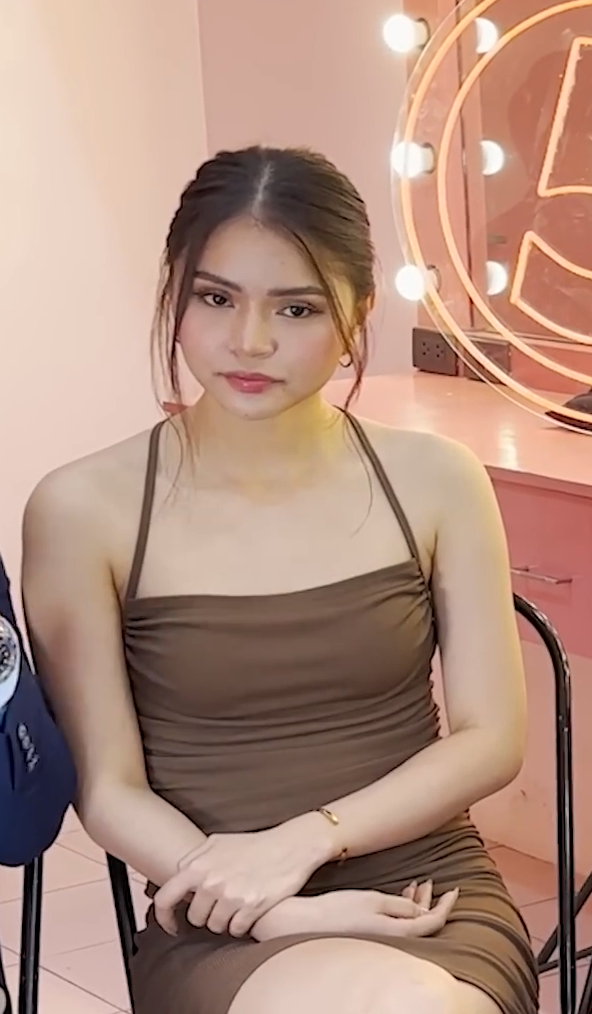
- Caraan in 2023
- Born: Aubrey Caraan; February 14, 1998 (age 28); Batangas, Philippines
- Occupations: Actress; singer
- Years active: 2008–present
- Agents: Star Magic (c. 2008–2011); Viva Communications (c. 2011–present)
- Musical career
- Genres: R&B; pop rock
- Instrument: Vocals
- Label: Viva
- Formerly of: Pop Girls

Aubrey Caraan (born February 14, 1998) is a Filipino actress and singer. As a child in 2008, she joined the reality singing competition show Pinoy Dream Academy: Little Dreamers, finishing in fourth place. She made her acting debut in the 2010 film Sa 'yo Lamang (transl. Only Yours).

Around the age of 13, she joined the bubblegum pop girl group Pop Girls, which disbanded in 2017. In 2021, she starred as Giniper in the romantic comedy film Ang Manananggal Na Nahahati Ang Puso (transl. The Manananggal Whose Heart is Split). In 2023, she portrayed Samantha "Sam" Vera in The Rain In España and Safe Skies, Archer, the first two installments of the University Series (based on books by Filipino author Gwy Saludes).

In 2024, she portrayed the younger version of Sue, Ana Roces' character in Sunny. It is a remake of the 2011 South Korean film of the same name.

In 2025, Caraan's Sam became the lead in Avenues of the Diamond, which also introduced her love interest Clyden Ramirez (Lance Carr). The Manila Standard named Diamond as one of 2025's top Philippine TV programs. Caraan also reprised her role as Sam in Golden Scenery of Tomorrow and joined the cast of Hell University, a mystery horror series.

== Early life and education ==
Aubrey Caraan was born on February 14, 1998 in Batangas, Philippines. She has been singing since she was five years old. She studied AB Communications at De La Salle Lipa.

== Career ==
=== 2008–2020: Beginnings, debut in Pop Girls, acting roles ===
At 10 years old in 2008, Caraan joined the ABS-CBN's reality singing competition show Pinoy Dream Academy: Little Dreamers. She finished in fourth place. She was with Star Magic for two years, before transferring to Viva Communications.

Her first acting credit was the 2010 film Sa 'yo Lamang (transl. Only Yours). Around the age of 13, she joined bubblegum pop girl group Pop Girls, in a new lineup replacing the original members (which included Filipino actress Nadine Lustre). In 2014, they received a nomination for Best Performance by a Group Recording Artist at the 27th Awit Awards. Pop Girls disbanded in 2017.

Caraan starred as Francine, a young woman who dreams of becoming a singer like her late mother, in the series One Song. It premiered on March 10, 2018 on Viva TV.

=== 2021–present: Avenues of the Diamond, breakthrough ===
Caraan starred as Giniper in the romantic comedy Ang Manananggal Na Nahahati Ang Puso (transl. The Manananggal Whose Heart is Split). Directed by Darryl Yap, the film premiered on VMX on October 21, 2021.

In November 2022, Caraan was announced as Samantha "Sam" Vera in the romance series The Rain In España, directed by Theodore Boborol. She also joined the ensemble cast of the sitcom Kalye Kweens (transl. Street Queens), which began airing on October 1. The show is based on the first book in Filipino author's Gwy Saludes' University Series. It premiered in May 2023, and was followed by Safe Skies, Archer in October, an adaptation of the series' second book. Caraan reprised her role as Sam. The franchise's cast was given the nickname of "Univerkada" (a portmanteau of the word "university" and the Tagalog word "barkada", referring to a group of friends).

In 2024, Caraan portrayed the younger version of Ana Roces' character Sue in Sunny, a remake of the 2011 South Korean film of the same name. The film is about a group of former high school friends who reunite to fulfill their friend's dying wish.

Caraan's Sam became the lead in Avenues of the Diamond, the fourth installment of the University Series. Diamond premiered on April 11, 2025. The show introduced Lance Carr as Clyden Ramirez, Sam's love interest. The Manila Standard included Diamond in its list of 2025's top Philippine TV programs.

In June, Caraan made a surprise appearance at the Ang Mutya ng Section E: OST Live In Concert at the New Frontier Theater. She performed a duet with Earl Agustin, which Janella P. Castillo of One Music Philippines described as "captivating" and "every bit as striking as she is".

She also released "How You Feel", which Agustin wrote. The Manila Bulletin's Punch Liwanag described it as an "R&B-inflected ballad". She released the pop rock song "Salo" (transl. Share). Both tracks are a part of the Avenues of the Diamond soundtrack.

In August, Caraan was one of the performers at Viva One Vivarkada: The Ultimate Fan-con and Grand Concert. She covered "Kakaibabe" by Donnalyn Bartolome alongside the other "Univerkada Girls". She later returned to sing "How You Feel". Her solo performance received positive reviews from critics. The Manila Standard's Jasper Valdez and Angelica Villanueva wrote that Caraan's singing "impress[ed] everyone inside the venue". Likewise, Fiel Gia Ramada and John Romme Alba of The Philippine Star described her performance as one of the "standout" moments of the night.

Caraan returned as Sam in the fifth installment of the University Series, Golden Scenery of Tomorrow, which premiered on October 18.

In November, she was announced as Samantha in Hell University, a mystery horror series that premiered in February 2026.

== Acting Credits ==
Key
†	Denotes films that have not yet been released

=== Television ===
Year	Title	Role	Ref.
2008	Pinoy Dream Academy: Little Dreamers	Herself	
2010	Maalaala Mo Kaya: Gitara	Choice Member	
2010	Maalaala Mo Kaya: Funeral Parlor	Mabel's Daughter	
2011	Maalaala Mo Kaya: Wig	Angelie Buena	
2016	Ang Kwarto Sa May Hagdanan	Joyce	
2017	Taddy Taddy Po	Libby	
2018	One Song	Francine	
2018	Class 3-C Has A Secret	Luna Levisque	
2019	A Not-So Fake Love Story	Janeca	
2020	Tropang Torpe	Apple	
2021	Kagat ng Dilim	Yana	
2021	Encounter	Princess	
2022	Kalye Kweens	Calynne	
2023	For The Love: Before I Let You Go	Lia	
2023	The Rain In España	Samantha Maureen "Sam" Vera	
2023	Safe Skies, Archer	Samantha Maureen "Sam" Vera	
2024	Chasing In The Wild	Samantha Maureen "Sam" Vera	
2025	Avenues of the Diamond	Samantha Maureen "Sam" Vera	
2025	Golden Scenery of Tomorrow	Samantha Maureen "Sam" Vera	
2026	Hell University	Samantha Shion	
2026	Our Yesterday's Escape	Samantha Maureen "Sam" Vera	

=== Film ===
Year	Title	Role	Ref.
2010	Sa 'yo Lamang	Lisa's classmate	
2014	Diary ng Panget	Student in canteen	
2015	Para sa Hopeless Romantic	Classmate	
2018	Squad Goals	Autumn	
2019	Indak	Carmel	
2021	Ang Manananggal Na Nahahati Ang Puso	Giniper	
2023	Pinoy Ghost Tales	Lucky	
2024	Sunny	Younger Sue	
2024	Nanay, Tatay	Bettina	
2026	Rosario	Beth	

=== Microdrama and Mini Series ===
Year	Title	Role	Ref.
2024	Sem Break	Cora	
2026	My Perfect Jowa	Yna	
