= Marco Gallo =

Italian-Filipino actor (born 2001)

- Born: Marco Cañete Gallo; January 3, 2001 (age 25); Milan, Italy
- Occupation: Actor
- Years active: 2016–present
- Known for: Pinoy Big Brother: Lucky 7

Marco Cañete Gallo (Tagalog: [ˈmɐɾko kɐnˈjetɛ gɐlˈjo]; born January 3, 2001) is an Italian-Filipino actor.

== Career ==
In August 2016, Gallo was selected to be one of the 12 housemates of a popular reality show in the Philippines, Pinoy Big Brother: Lucky 7, with the moniker, Ang Pilyo Bello ng Italy. However. Gallo was evicted on Day 95 after receiving the lowest number of votes.

== Filmography ==
=== Film ===
Year	Title	Role	Ref.
2017	Loving in Tandem	Tope	
2019	Familia Blondina		
2024	Men Are From QC, Women Are From Alabang		

=== Television ===
Year	Title	Role	Notes	Ref.
2017	Wansapanataym: Amazing Ving	Warren Ibañez		
2017	Ipaglaban Mo: Groufie	Jerome		
2018	Alamat ng Ano	Raphael		
2019	Maalaala Mo Kaya: Lipstick	Rey Marcus		
2019	The Killer Bride	Seth		
2020	Maynila: A Game Called Love	Chris		
2020	Tropang Torpe	Albert		
2020	Kagat ng Dilim	Cono Guy 1		
2021	Di Na Muli	CJ Balthazar		
2023	The Rain In España	Kalix Martinez		
2026	Project LOKI	Luthor Mendez		
2026	Love, Siargao	Jeremy		

=== Variety shows ===
Year	Title	Role	Notes	Ref.
2016	Pinoy Big Brother: Lucky 7	Himself	Housemate	
2024	Eat Bulaga!	Himself	Guest Performer	

== Discography ==
=== Singles ===
Year	Song title	Label	Ref.
2021	"Yes, No" (Oo, Hindi)	Viva Records	
