= Gwy Saludes =

Filipino romance author

- Born: Gwynette Jan C. Saludes; November 8, 2000 (age 26); Bataan, Central Luzon, the Philippines
- Education: Ateneo de Manila University
- Writing career
- Pen name: 4reuminct
- Genre: Romance
- Notable work: The Rain In España; Safe Skies, Archer; Chasing in the Wild; Avenues of the Diamond; Golden Scenery of Tomorrow; Our Yesterday's Escape

YouTube information
- Channel: Gwy Saludes
- Genres: Travel; lifestyle
- Subscribers: 669k

Gwynette Jan C. Saludes (born November 8, 2000) is a Filipino author of romance novels genre, who is known for her Wattpad pen name 4reuminct. Her notable Wattpad works are The Rain In España and Safe Skies, Archer, which were adapted into a 10-episode series.

== Personal life ==
Saludes was born on November 8, 2000. She studied legal management at Ateneo de Manila University.

== Career ==
Saludes is known in Wattpad by her pen name/username 4reuminct (4 is read as A). One of her notable works, The Rain In España is a KathNiel inspired story she writes on twitter (Twitterserye).

She also has a YouTube channel.

== Bibliography ==
=== Assault Series ===
1. Zedvage ssault
2. Quertige Assault
3. Gentle Wind of Vengeance
4. J, the Daredevil
5. Luminous Mystique of Anais

=== University Series ===
1. The Rain In España
2. Safe Skies, Archer
3. Chasing in the Wild
4. Avenues of the Diamond
5. Golden Scenery of Tomorrow
6. Our Yesterday’s Escape

=== Standalone ===
1. Life of the Heirs
2. The Curse of Cassianna

=== Short Novels ===
1. I Woke Up Today

=== Twitter Seryes ===
1. Along España
2. Around Dapitan
3. Between Walls
4. Across Katipunan
5. Above Level
