= Jerome Ponce =

Filipino actor and model

- Born: Joseph Jerome Gapido Porciuncula; June 4, 1995 (age 31); Santa Mesa, Manila, Philippines
- Education: Malayan High School of Science; Mapua Institute of Technology
- Occupations: Actor, model
- Years active: 2008–present
- Agents: Star Magic (2012–2022); Viva Artist Agency (2022–present)
- Height: 1.80 m (5 ft 11 in)

Joseph Jerome Gapido Porciuncula (born June 4, 1995), better known as Jerome Ponce, is a Filipino actor. He rose to fame after being cast in the hit Philippine daytime series Be Careful With My Heart as Luke Andrew Lim.

== Career ==
Ponce portrayed a minor role in the musical play Cory ng Edsa and started his showbiz career as a stage actor in theatre plays. In 2012, Ponce made his television debut in the long-running Philippine romantic comedy television series, Be Careful With My Heart, as Luke Lim, the eldest son of Richard "Sir Chief" Lim. Before joining the daytime drama, Ponce auditioned twice to enter Pinoy Big Brother and he was put in the reserved slot, but failed to make it to enter the house. He is one of the 12 "discoveries" for the new actors and actresses of the 2013 Star Magic Circle. Ponce had starring roles in the drama series Nasaan Ka Nang Kailangan Kita, The Good Son, A Soldier's Heart, Safe Skies Archer, Para sa Isa't Isa, Golden Scenery of Tomorrow and I Love You Since 1892.

== Personal life ==
Ponce was born on June 4, 1995. He graduated in Malayan High School of Science in Pandacan, Manila. He postponed his college studies at the Mapua Institute of Technology after entering his acting career. He was previously in a relationship with volleyball player Mika Reyes from 2017 until 2020.

== Filmography ==
=== Web series ===
Year	Title	Role	Notes	Ref(s)
2020–2021	Ben X Jim	Jimson Alcantara		
2021	GVBOYS	Jawo		

=== Film ===
Year	Title	Role	Notes	Ref(s)
2015	Haunted Mansion	Jacob		
2017	The Ghost Bride	Matt	Supporting role	
2018	Walwal	Intoy		
2018	Otlum	Allan		
2019	Finding You	Arnel "Nel" Allan Bunyl		
2019	Hello, Love, Goodbye	JM		
2019	Ang Henerasyong Sumuko Sa Love	Denzel		
2021	Katips	Gregorio "Greg" Lagusnilad		
	Mommy Issues	Migo		
2023	Martyr or Murderer	young Ninoy Aquino		
2024	A Glimpse of Forever	Dante		
2025	In Thy Name	Herbert Dilag		
2026	Pee Mak			

=== Television ===
Year	Title	Role	Ref(s)
2012–2014	Be Careful with My Heart	Luke Andrew Lim	
2013–2022	ASAP	Himself	
2015	Nasaan Ka Nang Kailangan Kita	Ryan Briones	
2015	Pangako Sa 'Yo	Charles Garcia	
2016	Ipaglaban Mo: Peligro	Danny	
2016	Ipaglaban Mo: Tapat	Ben	
2016	Wansapanataym: Candy's Crush	Paolo Angara	
2016	Maalaala Mo Kaya: Pintura	Gilbert	
2017	Maalaala Mo Kaya: Tahanan	Teen Recho	
2017	Ipaglaban Mo: Sementado	Kiko	
2017–2018	The Good Son	Lorenzo "Enzo" Buenavidez	
2018	Ipaglaban Mo: Bastardo	Vince Antolin	
2018	Precious Hearts Romances Presents: Los Bastardos	young Enrico Matias	
2019	Ipaglaban Mo: Hawa	Hans	
2019	The General's Daughter	young Greg	
2019	Maalaala Mo Kaya: Simbahan	Kiko	
2020	A Soldier's Heart	Philip "Phil" Panganiban	
2020	Fill in the Bank	Himself	
2020–2021	Sunday 'Kada	Himself	
2020–2021	Sunday Noontime Live!	Himself	
2021	Gen Z	Jojo Garcia	
2022	FPJ's Ang Probinsyano	P/Cpt. Adrian Jimenez	
2021	Click, Like, Share: Found	Vince	
2023	Roadkillers	Marco	
2023–2024	Safe Skies Archer	Akihiro Juarez	
2024	Eat Bulaga!	Himself	
2024–2025	It's Showtime	Himself	
2025–2026	Para sa Isa't Isa	Zion Magtibay	
2025–2026	I Love You Since 1892	Juanito Alfonso	
2025	Golden Scenery of Tomorrow	Akihiro Juarez	

=== Microdrama ===
Year	Title	Role
2025	Love is Commute	Gino

=== Music videos ===
Year	Title	Artist
2024	Iced Coffee	Pix!e
2025	Makaluma	Wilbert Ross

== Awards ==
Year	Award-giving body	Category	Work	Result	Ref.
2014	GMMSF Box-Office Entertainment Awards	Most Promising Loveteam on Television (with Janella Salvador)	Be Careful With My Heart	Won	
2014	62nd FAMAS Awards	German Moreno Youth Achievement Awards	Himself	Won	
