= Song Joong-ki filmography =

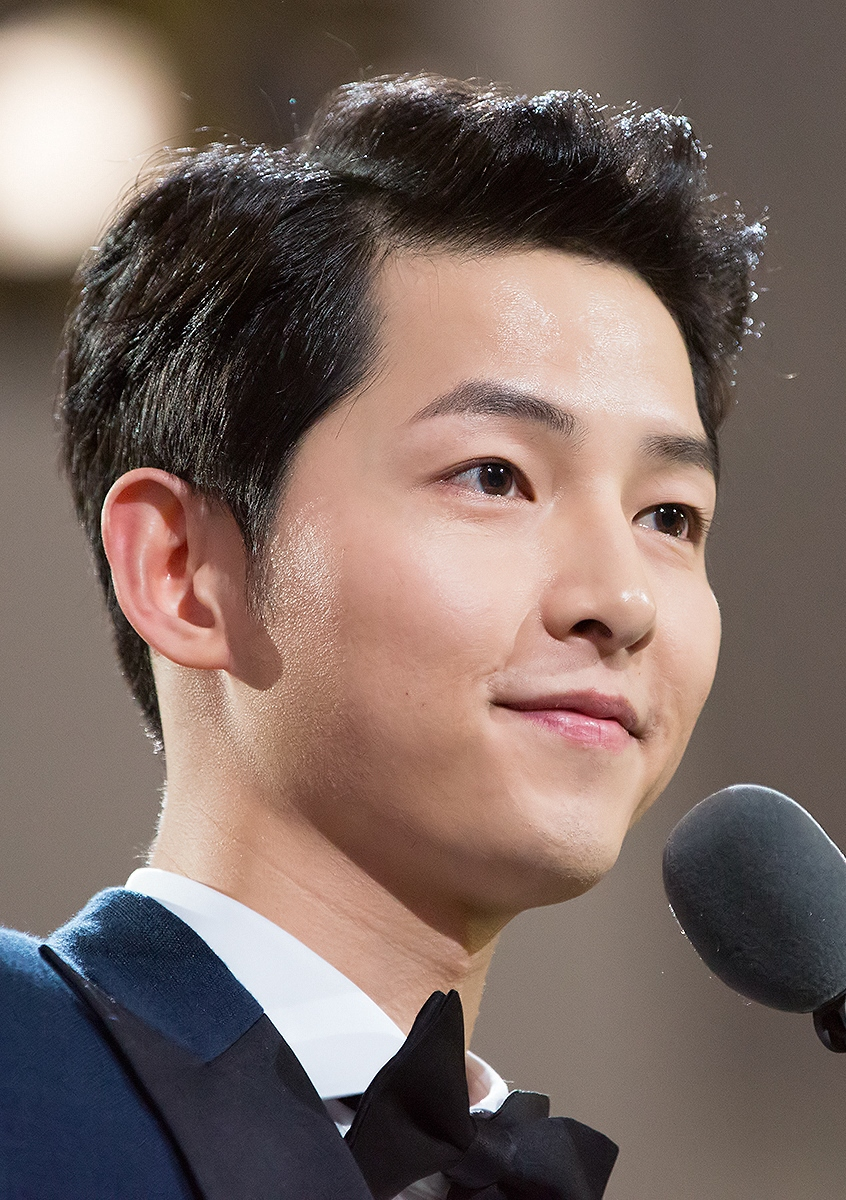
- Song in 2016
- Film: 14
- Television series: 19
- Television show: 8
- Hosting: 12
- Music videos: 3

Song Joong-ki is a South Korean actor. He is well known for his performances in the television series The Innocent Man (2012), Descendants of the Sun (2016), Vincenzo (2021), Reborn Rich (2022), as well as the films A Werewolf Boy (2012), The Battleship Island (2017), and Space Sweepers (2022).

== Film ==
Year	Title	Hangul	Role	Notes	Ref.
2008	A Frozen Flower	쌍화점	No-tak		
2009	Five Senses of Eros	오감도	Yoo Jae-hyuk		
2009	The Case of Itaewon Homicide	이태원 살인사건	Jo Jong-pil		
2010	Hearty Paws 2	마음이 2	Dong-wook		
2011	Penny Pinchers	티끌모아 로맨스	Chun Ji-woong		
2011	Rio	리오	Blu (voice)	Korean dub	
2012	Pengi and Sommi	황제펭귄 펭이와 솜이	Narrator (voice)		
2012	The Grand Heist	바람과 함께 사라지다	older Jung-goon	Cameo	
2012	A Werewolf Boy	늑대소년	Chul-soo		
2017	The Battleship Island	군함도	Park Moo-young		
2021	Space Sweepers	승리호	Kim Tae-ho		
2023	Hopeless	화란	Chi-gun		
2024	My Name Is Loh Kiwan	로기완	Loh Ki-wan		
2024	Bogota: City of the Lost	보고타: 마지막 기회의 땅	Guk-hee		

== Television series ==
Year	Title	Hangul	Role	Notes	Ref.
2007	Get Karl! Oh Soo-jung	칼잡이 오수정	Reporter 2	Cameo	
2008	Love Racing	러브 레이싱	Miso		
2008	My Precious You	내 사랑 금지옥엽	Jang Jin-ho		
2009	Triple	트리플	Ji Poong-ho		
2009	My Fair Lady	아가씨를 부탁해	Head butler	Cameo	
2009	Will It Snow for Christmas?	크리스마스에 눈이 올까요?	Han Ji-yong	Cameo	
2010	OB & GY	산부인과	Ahn Kyung-woo		
2010	Sungkyunkwan Scandal	성균관 스캔들	Gu Yong-ha		
2011	Deep Rooted Tree	뿌리깊은 나무	young Yi Do	Ep. 1–4, 6, 8	
2012	The Innocent Man	세상 어디에도 없는 착한남자	Kang Ma-ru		
2016	Descendants of the Sun	태양의 후예	Yoo Si-jin		
2016	The Sound of Your Heart	마음의 소리	Webtoonist	Cameo (episode 1)	
2017	Man to Man	맨투맨	Bank teller	Cameo (episode 9)	
2019	Arthdal Chronicles	아스달 연대기	Eun Seom / Saya	Season 1	
2021	Vincenzo	빈센조	Vincenzo Cassano / Park Joo-hyung		
2022	Little Women	작은 아씨들	Park Joo-hyung	Cameo (episode 2)	
2022	Reborn Rich	재벌집 막내아들	Jin Do-joon / Yoon Hyun-woo		
2024	Queen of Tears	눈물의 여왕	Vincenzo Cassano	Cameo (episode 8)	
2025	My Youth	마이 유스	Sunwoo Hae		

== Television shows ==
Year	Title	Hangul	Notes	Ref.
2009–10	Let's Go! Dream Team Season 2	출발! 드림팀 시즌2	Cast member, episodes 1, 10-13	
2010–11	Running Man	런닝맨	Regular, episodes 1-41; Guest, episode 66; Cameo, episodes 71, 97, 251, 283	
2011	I'm Real: Song Joong-ki	I'm Real 송중기	Two-episode show exploring the city of Tokyo	
2011–12	Tears of the Antarctic	남극의 눈물	As narrator in documentary	
2016	KBS News 9	KBS 뉴스9	First actor to appear on prime-time news	
2016	Happy Camp	쾌락대본영	His first time appearance in a Chinese variety show	
2016	Running Man China Season 4	러닝 브라더스 시즌4	Guest, episode 7	
2017	JTBC Newsroom	JTBC 뉴스룸	Interview	

== Music videos ==
Year	Song title	Hangul	Artist	Ref.
2009	"Wicked Tongue"	독설	Tei	
2012	"Men Are All Like That"	남자가 다 그렇지 뭐	Kim Jong-kook	
2021	"Happen"	헤픈 우연	Heize	

== Hosting ==
Year	Program	Notes	Ref.
2009–10	Music Bank	With Seo Hyo-rim	
2010	2nd Melon Music Awards		
2010	24th KBS Drama Awards	With Choi Soo-jong, Lee Da-hae	
2011	Mnet 20's Choice Awards	With Bae Suzy	
2011	Dream Concert	With Kim Hee-chul, Goo Hara	
2012	Made in U		
2012	14th Mnet Asian Music Awards		
2017	19th Mnet Asian Music Awards		
2018	20th Mnet Asian Music Awards		
2020	22nd Mnet Asian Music Awards		
2021	23rd Mnet Asian Music Awards		
2021	26th Busan International Film Festival	with Park So-dam	
