= A Werewolf Boy (2026 film) =

2026 Philippine fantasy romance film

- Theatrical release poster
- Directed by: Crisanto B. Aquino
- Screenplay by: Che Espiritu
- Based on: A Werewolf Boy by Jo Sung-hee
- Produced by: Vincent Del Rosario III; Veronique Del Rosario-Corpus; Valerie Salvador Del Rosario
- Starring: Rabin Angeles; Angela Muji
- Cinematography: MJ Bongon
- Edited by: Vanessa Ubas de Leon
- Music by: Dek Margaja
- Production companies: Viva Films; Studio Viva; CJ ENM
- Distributed by: Viva Films
- Release date: January 14, 2026
- Country: Philippines
- Language: Tagalog

A Werewolf Boy is a 2026 Philippine fantasy romance film directed by Crisanto B. Aquino. It is a remake of the 2012 South Korean film A Werewolf Boy. The film stars Rabin Angeles and Angela Muji in the lead roles, alongside veteran actress Lorna Tolentino. The film is produced by Viva Films and Studio Viva in partnership with CJ ENM. It was released in the Philippines on January 14, 2026.

== Plot ==
A teenage girl moves to the countryside with her family. She meets a mysterious feral boy who lives on their property. The girl attempts to teach the boy how to behave like a human, but his wild instincts create challenges as their bond grows.

== Cast ==
- Rabin Angeles as Boy, a feral, mute boy raised by wolves who exhibits wild behavior but possesses a gentle, fiercely loyal heart
- Angela Muji as Sara, a lonely, sheltered girl who moves to the countryside for her health and eventually opens up while taming and teaching the boy
- Candy Pangilinan as Stella, the kind-hearted and patient mother of Sara
- Yayo Aguila
- Jeffrey Hidalgo
- Albie Casiño as Juancho, a wealthy, arrogant landlord's son who is obsessed on Sara and tries to destroy the boy. Originally played by Yoo Yeon-seok (Ji-tae).
- Rose Van Ginkel
- Annika Co as Mimi
- Simon Ibarra as Colonel Ricardo
- Onyl Torres as Dr. Milado
- Raffy Tejada as Mang Josep
- Angel Raymundo as Aling Marie
- Francis Mata as Dr. Domingo
- Karl Medina as the police chief
- Ruslan Jacob as Billy
- Lui Manansala
- Kanye Avendaño
- Luna Amor Buniag as Bella
- Boaz Mariano as an assistant doctor
- Omar Flores as Sara's doctor
- Lorna Tolentino as older Sara

== Production ==
=== Development ===
The project is a co-production between Philippine studios Viva Films and Studio Viva, and the South Korean entertainment company CJ ENM. The partnership followed a strategic Memorandum of Agreement (MOA) signed between the involved parties. The adaptation was officially announced on 29 September 2025, during a media conference for the finale of the series Seducing Drake Palma. Crisanto B. Aquino, who previously directed Instant Daddy and My Future You, was attached to direct the film.

=== Casting ===
Rabin Angeles and Angela Muji were cast in the lead roles, marking their first lead performances in a feature film. The pair previously starred together in the Viva One series Seducing Drake Palma. Angeles stated that he felt pressure regarding the role, which was originally played by Song Joong-ki. He noted that he did not watch the entire original film to ensure his performance remained distinct. Angeles prepared for the role by studying materials related to wolves.

=== Filming ===
Principal photography began on 1 October 2025. Filming took place on location in Taal, Batangas. Angela Muji described the acting style for the film as "subtle" and different from her work in television series. Angeles was required to wear prosthetics for the character, a process that took four hours to apply. He stated that he remained in character during the prosthetic application.

== Release ==
A Werewolf Boy was released in Philippine cinemas on January 14, 2026. A teaser trailer was released in September 2025 showing Muji's character observing Angeles.
