= Blue Dragon Film Award for Best New Actor =

Blue Dragon South Korean film award

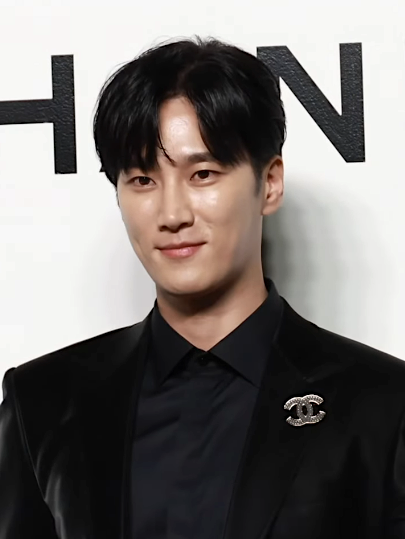
- The 2025 recipient: Ahn Bo-hyun
- Awarded for: Best New Actor
- Country: South Korea
- Presented by: Blue Dragon Film Awards
- First award: 1963
- Winner: Ahn Bo-hyun
- Website: blueaward.co.kr

The Blue Dragon Film Award for Best New Actor is one of the awards that is presented annually at the Blue Dragon Film Awards by Sports Chosun, which is typically held at the end of the year.

== Winners ==
=== 1960s – 1970s ===
Year	Winner	Film	Original title	Role(s)
1965 (3rd)	Not awarded to actor			
1966 (4th)	Not awarded to actor			
1967 (5th)	Oh Yeong-il			
1969 (6th)	Not awarded			
1970 (7th)	Go Kang-il	Love Gone with the Fallen Leaves	낙엽 따라 가버린 사랑	
1971 (8th)	Noh Woo-hyeon	Once More, for Love - Final Episode	미워도 다시 한 번 완결편	
1971 (8th)	Ha Myeong-joong	Why She Doesn't Marry	누야 와 시집 안가노	
1972 (9th)	Im Ji-seong	A Cattle Seller	소장수	Ok-bun
1973 (10th)	Shin Il-ryong	Long Live the Island Frogs	섬개구리 만세	Kwon Ga-byun

=== 1990s ===
Year	Winner	Film	Original title	Role(s)
1990 (11th)	Park Sang-min	General's Son	장군의 아들	Kim Du-han
1991 (12th)	Choi Jin-young	Beyond the Mountain	산산이 부서진 이름이여	Chim-hae
1992 (13th)	Cho Jae-hyun	Cutting the Sorrow With a Knife Stuck in the Chest	가슴에 돋는 칼로 슬픔을 자르고	Jae-ho
1993 (14th)	Kim Myeong-su	Watercolor Painting in a Rainy Day 2	비 오는 날 수채화 2 - 느티나무 언덕	Ji-su
1994 (15th)	Yeo Kyun-dong	To You from Me	너에게 나를 보낸다	Bank clerk
1995 (16th)	Lee Jung-jae	The Young Man	젊은남자	Lee Han
1996 (17th)	Park Shin-yang	Yuri	유리	Yuri
1996 (17th)	Han Jae-suk	Unfix	언픽스	Bodyguard Choi
1997 (18th)	Jang Dong-gun	Repechage	패자부활전	Min-gyu
1997 (18th)	Park Yong-woo	The Hole	올가미	Dong-woo
1997 (18th)	Song Kang-ho	No. 3	넘버 3	Jo-pil
1997 (18th)	Jung Joon	Change	체인지	Kang Dae-ho
1997 (18th)	Hwang In-sung	Deep Blue	깊은 슬픔	Yoo Hyun-se
1998 (19th)	Ahn Jae-wook	Tie a Yellow Ribbon	찜	Joon-hyuk
1998 (19th)	Baek Jong-hak	The Power of Kangwon Province	강원도의 힘	Sang-kwon
1999 (20th)	Lee Sung-jae	Art Museum by the Zoo	미술관 옆 동물원	Cheol-soo
1999 (20th)	Kim Suk-hoon	A Great Chinese Restaurant	북경반점	Yang Han-kook
1999 (20th)	Sul Kyung-gu	Rainbow Trout	송어	Min-soo
1999 (20th)	Song Seung-heon	Calla	카라	Kim Sun-woo
1999 (20th)	Yoo Ji-tae	Attack the Gas Station	주유소 습격사건	Paint

=== 2000s ===
Year	Winner	Film	Original title	Role(s)
2000 (21st)	Kim Rae-won	Plum Blossom	청춘	Kim Ja-hyo
2000 (21st)	Kim In-kwon	Anarchists	아나키스트	Sang-gu
2000 (21st)	Oh Ji-ho	La Belle	미인	Man
2000 (21st)	Cho Seung-woo	Chunhyang	춘향뎐	Mongryong
2000 (21st)	Choi Woo-jae	Pisces	물고기자리	Dong-suk
2001 (22nd)	Cha Tae-hyun	My Sassy Girl	엽기적인 그녀	Gyun-woo
2001 (22nd)	Kim Myung-min	Sorum	소름	Yong-hyun
2001 (22nd)	Won Bin	Guns & Talks	킬러들의 수다	Ha-yoon
2001 (22nd)	Jun Kwang-ryul	Kiss Me Much	베사메무쵸	Cheol-su
2001 (22nd)	Jung Woon-taek	Friend	친구	Jung-ho
2002 (23rd)	Hwang Jung-min	Road Movie	로드무비	Dae-shik
2002 (23rd)	Kam Woo-sung	Marriage Is a Crazy Thing	결혼은 미친 짓이다	Joon-young
2002 (23rd)	Kwon Sang-woo	Make It Big	일단 뛰어	Woo-seob
2002 (23rd)	Kim Sang-kyung	On the Occasion of Remembering the Turning Gate	생활의 발견	Gyung-soo
2002 (23rd)	Jung Chan	Road Movie	로드무비	Suk-won
2003 (24th)	Bae Yong-joon	Untold Scandal	스캔들 - 조선 남녀 상열지사	Jo-won
2003 (24th)	Kim Nam-jin	Spring Bears Love	봄날의 곰을 좋아하세요?	Dong-ha
2003 (24th)	Ryoo Seung-bum	Conduct Zero	품행제로	Joong-pil
2003 (24th)	Park Hae-il	Jealousy Is My Middle Name	질투는 나의 힘	Lee Won-sang
2004 (25th)	Jae Hee	3-Iron	빈집	Tae-suk
2004 (25th)	Gang Dong-won	Temptation of Wolves	늑대의 유혹	Jung Tae-sung
2004 (25th)	Go Soo	Some	썸	Kang Sung-joo
2004 (25th)	Kim Dong-wan	Spin Kick	돌려차기	Yong-gaek
2004 (25th)	Jo Han-sun	Temptation of Wolves	늑대의 유혹	Ban Hae-won
2005 (26th)	Chun Jung-myung	The Aggressives	태풍태양	So-yo
2005 (26th)	Lee Tae-sung	Blossom Again	사랑니	Lee Seok / Lee Soo
2005 (26th)	Park Gun-hyung	Innocent Steps	댄서의 순정	Lee Young-sae
2005 (26th)	Tak Jae-hoon	Marrying the Mafia II	가문의 위기	Jang Suk-jae
2005 (26th)	Yoon Kye-sang	Flying Boys	발레 교습소	Kang Min-jae
2006 (27th)	Ryu Deok-hwan	Like a Virgin	천하장사 마돈나	Oh Dong-ku
2006 (27th)	Ha Jung-woo	The Unforgiven	용서받지 못한 자	Yoo Tae-jeong
2006 (27th)	Jin Goo	A Dirty Carnival	비열한 거리	Jong-soo
2006 (27th)	Lee Joon-gi	The King and the Clown	왕의 남자	Gong-gil
2006 (27th)	On Joo-wan	The Peter Pan Formula	피터팬의 공식	Kim Han-soo
2007 (28th)	Daniel Henney	My Father	마이 파더	James Parker
2007 (28th)	Jang Keun-suk	The Happy Life	즐거운 인생	Park Hyeon-jun
2007 (28th)	Jung Ji-hoon	I'm a Cyborg, But That's OK	싸이보그지만 괜찮아	Park Il-soon
2007 (28th)	Lee Min-ki	A Good Day to Have an Affair	바람피기 좋은날	Student
2007 (28th)	Yoo Ah-in	Skeletons in the Closet	좋지 아니한가	Shim Yong-tae
2008 (29th)	Kang Ji-hwan	Rough Cut	영화는 영화다	Jang Soo-ta
2008 (29th)	So Ji-sub	Rough Cut	영화는 영화다	Gang-pae
2008 (29th)	Kim Nam-gil	Public Enemy Returns	강철중: 공공의 적 1-1	Mun-su
2008 (29th)	Lee Yeong-hoon	The Guard Post	GP 506	Corporal Kang Jin-won
2008 (29th)	Ryu Tae-joon	Girl Scout	걸스카우트	Lee Jong-dae
2009 (30th)	Yang Ik-june	Breathless	똥파리	Sang-hoon
2009 (30th)	Choi Jae-woong	The Sword with No Name	불꽃처럼 나비처럼	Noe-jeon
2009 (30th)	Kim Ji-seok	Take Off	국가대표	Kang Chil-gu
2009 (30th)	Kim Mu-yeol	The Scam	작전	Jo Min-hyeong
2009 (30th)	Song Chang-eui	Once Upon a Time in Seoul	소년은 울지 않는다	Tae-ho

=== 2010s ===
Year	Winner	Film	Original title	Role(s)
2010 (31st)	Choi Seung-hyun	71: Into the Fire	포화 속으로	Oh Jang-beom
2010 (31st)	Go Soo	White Night	백야행: 하얀 어둠 속을 걷다	Kim Yo-han
2010 (31st)	Song Sae-byeok	The Servant	방자전	Byeon Hak-do
2010 (31st)	Song Joong-ki	Hearty Paws 2	마음이 2	Dong-wook
2010 (31st)	Choi Daniel	Cyrano Agency	시라노; 연애조작단	Lee Sang-yong
2011 (32nd)	Lee Je-hoon	Bleak Night	파수꾼	Ki-tae
2011 (32nd)	Park Jung-bum	The Journals of Musan	무산일기	Jeon Seung-chul
2011 (32nd)	Seo Jun-young	Bleak Night	파수꾼	Dong-yoon
2011 (32nd)	Song Yoo-ha	Petty Romance	쩨쩨한 로맨스	Han Jong-soo
2011 (32nd)	Lee David	The Front Line	고지전	Nam Seong-Shik
2012 (33rd)	Jo Jung-suk	Architecture 101	건축학개론	Nabddeuki
2012 (33rd)	Kim Sung-kyun	Nameless Gangster: Rules of the Time	범죄와의 전쟁: 나쁜놈들 전성시대	Park Chang-woo
2012 (33rd)	Kim Soo-hyun	The Thieves	도둑들	Zampano
2012 (33rd)	Yoo Yeon-seok	Horror Stories	무서운 이야기	The killer
2012 (33rd)	Lee Kwang-soo	All About My Wife	내 아내의 모든 것	PD Choi
2013 (34th)	Yeo Jin-goo	Hwayi: A Monster Boy	화이: 괴물을 삼킨 아이	Hwa-yi
2013 (34th)	Go Kyung-pyo	Horror Stories 2	무서운 이야기 2	Go Byeong-shin
2013 (34th)	Seo Young-joo	Moebius	뫼비우스	Son
2013 (34th)	Lee Hyun-woo	Secretly, Greatly	은밀하게 위대하게	Rhee Hae-jin
2013 (34th)	Lim Seul-ong	26 Years	26년	Kwon Jung-hyuk
2014 (35th)	Park Yoo-chun	Haemoo	해무	Dong-sik
2014 (35th)	Kim Woo-bin	Friend: The Great Legacy	친구 2	Choi Sung-hoon
2014 (35th)	Ahn Jae-hong	The King of Jokgu	족구왕	Hong Man-seop
2014 (35th)	Yim Si-wan	The Attorney	변호인	Park Jin-woo
2014 (35th)	Choi Jin-hyuk	The Divine Move	신의 한 수	Seon-soo
2015 (36th)	Choi Woo-shik	Set Me Free	거인	Yeong-jae
2015 (36th)	Kang Ha-neul	Twenty	스물	Kyung-jae
2015 (36th)	Park Seo-joon	The Chronicles of Evil	악의 연대기	Cha Dong-jae
2015 (36th)	Byun Yo-han	Socialphobia	소셜포비아	Ji-woong
2015 (36th)	Lee Min-ho	Gangnam Blues	강남 1970	Kim Jong-dae
2016 (37th)	Park Jeong-min	Dongju: The Portrait of a Poet	동주	Song Mong-gyu
2016 (37th)	Lee Sang-yoon	Insane	날, 보러와요	Na Nam-soo
2016 (37th)	Lee Won-keun	The Net	그물	Oh Jin-woo
2016 (37th)	Jo Woo-jin	Inside Men	내부자들	Managing director Jo
2016 (37th)	Ji Soo	One Way Trip	글로리데이	Yong-Bi
2017 (38th)	Do Kyung-soo	My Annoying Brother	형	Go Doo-young
2017 (38th)	Koo Kyo-hwan	Jane	꿈의 제인	Jane
2017 (38th)	Kim Jun-han	Anarchist from Colony	박열	Datemas Kaisei
2017 (38th)	Nam Yeon-woo	Lost To Shame	분장	Oh Song-Joon
2017 (38th)	Ryu Jun-yeol	A Taxi Driver	택시운전사	Gu Jae-sik
2018 (39th)	Nam Joo-hyuk	The Great Battle	안시성	Sa-mul
2018 (39th)	Kim Young-kwang	On Your Wedding Day	너의 결혼식	Hwang Woo-yeon
2018 (39th)	Sung Yoo-bin	Last Child	살아남은 아이	Yoon Ki-hyun
2018 (39th)	Wi Ha-joon	Gonjiam: Haunted Asylum	곤지암	Ha-joon
2018 (39th)	Lee Ga-sub	The Seeds of Violence	폭력의 씨앗	Joo-Yong
2019 (40th)	Park Hae-soo	By Quantum Physics: A Nightlife Venture	양자물리학	Lee Chan-woo
2019 (40th)	Gong Myung	Extreme Job	극한직업	Detective Jae-hoon
2019 (40th)	Kim Sung-cheol	The Battle of Jangsari	장사리: 잊혀진 영웅들	Ki Ha-Ryun
2019 (40th)	Park Hyung-sik	Juror 8	배심원들	Kwon Nam-woo
2019 (40th)	Jung Hae-in	Tune in for Love	유열의 음악앨범	Cha Hyun-woo

=== 2020s ===
Year	Winner	Film	Original title	Role(s)
2020 (41st)	Teo Yoo	Vertigo	버티고	Lee Jin-soo
2020 (41st)	Woo Do-hwan	The Divine Move 2: The Wrathful	신의 한 수: 귀수편	Loner
2020 (41st)	Lee Bong-geun	The Singer	소리꾼	Hak-gyu
2020 (41st)	Lee Hak-joo	Welcome To The Guesthouse	어서오시게스트하우스	Joon-geun
2020 (41st)	Hong Kyung	Innocence	결백	Ahn Jung-soo
2021 (42nd)	Jung Jae-kwang	Not Out	낫아웃	Shin Gwang-ho
2021 (42nd)	Kim Jae-beom	Hostage: Missing Celebrity	인질	Choi Ki-wan
2021 (42nd)	Nam Da-reum	Sinkhole	싱크홀	Jung Seung-tae
2021 (42nd)	Ryu Kyung-soo	Hostage: Missing Celebrity	인질	Yeom Dong-hun
2021 (42nd)	Ha Jun	Festival	잔칫날	Kyeong-man
2022 (43rd)	Kim Dong-hwi	In Our Prime	이상한 나라의 수학자	Han Ji-woo
2022 (43rd)	Mu Jin-Sung	Perhaps Love	장르만 로맨스	Yoo-jin
2022 (43rd)	Seo In-guk	Project Wolf Hunting	늑대사냥	Park Jong-doo
2022 (43rd)	Lee Seo-jun	Hansan: Rising Dragon	한산: 용의 출현	Sahee
2022 (43rd)	Ong Seong-wu	Life Is Beautiful	인생은 아름다워	Jung-woo
2023 (44th)
2023 (44th)	Hong Xa-bin	Hopeless	화란	Yeon-gyu
2023 (44th)	Lee Shin-young	Rebound	리바운드	Cheon Ki-beom
2023 (44th)	Kim Seon-ho	The Childe	귀공자	(Gwigongja)
2023 (44th)	Kang Tae-joo	The Childe	귀공자	Marco Han
2023 (44th)	Choi Min-young	Dream Palace	드림팰리스	Dong-wook
2024 (45th)
2024 (45th)	Noh Sang-hyun ‡	Love in the Big City	대도시의 사랑법	Heung-soo
2024 (45th)	Kang Seung-ho	House of the Seasons	장손	
2024 (45th)	Lee Do-hyun	Exhuma	파묘	Yoon Bong-gil
2024 (45th)	Lee Jung-ha	Victory	빅토리	Yoon Chi-hyung
2024 (45th)	Joo Jong-hyuk	Because I Hate Korea	한국이 싫어서	Jae-in
2025 (46th)
2025 (46th)	Ahn Bo-hyun	Pretty Crazy	악마가 이사왔다	Gil-goo
2025 (46th)	Park Jin-young	Hi-Five	하이파이브	Seo Yeong-chun
2025 (46th)	Ahn Hyo-seop	Omniscient Reader: The Prophecy	전지적 독자 시점	Kim Dok-ja
2025 (46th)	Jung Sung-il	Uprising	전,란	Genshin
2025 (46th)	Cho Yoo-hyun	3670	3670	Cheol-jun

== General references ==
- "Winners and nominees lists". Blue Dragon Film Awards (in Korean). Archived from the original on 27 January 2022.
- "Blue Dragon Film Awards". Naver (in Korean).
