= Space Sweepers =

2021 South Korean science fiction film

- Official release poster
- Hangul: 승리호
- Hanja: 勝利號
- RR: Seungniho
- MR: Sŭngniho
- Directed by: Jo Sung-hee
- Written by: Yoon Seung-min; Yoo-kang Seo-ae; Jo Sung-hee
- Produced by: Yoon In-beom; Kim Soo-jin
- Starring: Song Joong-ki; Kim Tae-ri; Jin Seon-kyu; Yoo Hae-jin
- Cinematography: Byun Bong-sun
- Edited by: Nam Na-young; Ha Mi-ra
- Music by: Kim Tae-seong
- Production companies: Bidangil Pictures; Dexter Studios
- Distributed by: Netflix
- Release date: February 5, 2021
- Running time: 136 minutes
- Country: South Korea
- Languages: Korean; English; Spanish; Danish; French; German; Russian; Chinese; Arabic; Filipino; Mandarin
- Budget: ₩24 billion (~US$21.2 million)

Space Sweepers (Korean: 승리호; RR: Seungniho; lit. Spaceship Victory) is a 2021 South Korean science fiction film directed by Jo Sung-hee, starring Song Joong-ki, Kim Tae-ri, Jin Seon-kyu and Yoo Hae-jin. Regarded as the first Korean film space blockbuster, it was released directly on Netflix worldwide on February 5, 2021.

== Plot summary ==
During the year 2092, Tae-ho, Captain Jang, Tiger Park and an android named Bubs are a crew of space sweepers who live at an orbiting space station created by the UTS corporation after Earth becomes uninhabitable. Under the leadership of Sullivan, UTS has also created artificial planetoids for a select group of humans, who live idyllic lives. UTS has also terraformed Mars, intending to colonise the planet. By contrast, 90% of humanity lives in poverty and squalor on a dying Earth.

Tae-ho's crew struggle with mounting debts, loan sharks, and competition from other space sweepers. During their work, Captain discovers a child robot named Dorothy, who contains a weapon of mass destruction purportedly created by the terrorist group "Black Foxes". They negotiate a ransom for returning Dorothy, but their plan is foiled when UTS soldiers stage a massacre at the club where the exchange was supposed to take place. The UTS subsequently frames Tae-ho and his crew as terrorists.

The crew begins to warm up to the girl. Dorothy reminds Tae-ho of his adopted daughter Kim Su-ni, who was blown out into space during a space accident. Tae-ho and Jang were once UTS soldiers but defected after being forced to kill refugees fleeing Earth and incurring the wrath of Sullivan. Bubs and Park also befriend Dorothy.

Tae-ho and his group come into conflict with the Black Foxes, led by Karum. Following a confrontation on a space station, Karum reveals that the Black Fox are not terrorists but rather environmentalists seeking to return Dorothy to her father Kang Hyeon-u, a dissident scientist who has fallen afoul of Sullivan. Dorothy is revealed to be Kang Kot-nim, a human who was injected with nanobots by her father in an attempt to heal her. Sullivan wants Kang because her nanobots can interact with other nanobots and terraform Mars, making her a superweapon.

Sullivan's UTS forces track down the two groups and kill the Black Foxes. However, he spares Tae-ho, Jang, Park and Bubs due to his past relationships with the former two. In return for Tae-ho surrendering Kang Kot-nim, Sullivan grants the space sweepers an amnesty and a lump sum to cover their debts. Tae-ho uses his share of the money to fund an expedition to find his lost daughter Kim Su-ni but feels guilty about betraying Kang.

Sullivan considers Kang's nanobots as a threat due to their potential to restore the Earth and render his idyllic planetoids irrelevant. Because only a direct thermonuclear blast can destroy the nonobots, he intends to destroy the nanobots, Earth, and Kang all at once by sending them with the bomb to crash on Earth. Tae-ho's team rescue Kang but struggle to disable the bomb and stop the collision. They enlist the help of the other spacers in stopping the collision. During a climactic battle with Sullivan, Tae-ho and his companions manage to detach the bomb from the orbital factory. Sullivan is killed when the bomb collides with his spaceship.

Following the battle, UTS makes reparations to those affected by Sullivan's crimes. Kang Kot-nim is adopted by Tae-ho and his crew, who are richer and settle scores with their crooked financial manager. Tae-ho also reconnects with Kim Su-ni on the astral plane while Bubs obtains a female human body.

== Cast ==
- Song Joong-ki as Kim Tae-ho – Former Commander of the Space Guards and the first ever UTS Genius.
- Kim Tae-ri as Captain Jang / Jang Hyun-sook – Former Special Forces Squad officer who later deserted her post to create her own pirate organization. She attempted to assassinate CEO James Sullivan in which her entire pirate crew were killed.
- Jin Seon-kyu as Tiger Park / Park Kyung-soo – Former Drug King who escaped Earth after being arrested and sentenced to death.
- Yoo Hae-jin (voice) as Robot Bubs – Former military robot trying to save up for a skin graft
  - Kim Hyang-gi as Bubs' new body
- Richard Armitage as James Sullivan – The CEO of UTS and the main antagonist. A survivor of World War II who has grown disgusted with humanity throughout his long life. He seeks to destroy the Earth and its people so he can start again in Mars with his followers, to turn it into a new Eden.
- Kim Mu-yeol as Kang Hyeon-u – Kang Kot-nim's father and a scientist.
- Park Ye-rin as Dorothy / Kang Kot-nim – a robot who is the target of pursuit by multiple factions.
- Oh Ji-yul as Kim Su-ni – Tae-ho's adopted daughter
- Anupam Tripathi as Sullivan's assistant
- Christian Lagahit as Restaurant manager
- Nas Brown as Karum, leader of the Black Foxes

== Themes ==
The film criticises capitalism. The process of the colonization of Mars in the film has been compared to billionaires prepping for an apocalypse. Avery Kaplan of ComicsBeat noted that "while capitalism may make the members of the Victory crew more likely to go for each others' throats, it can't completely eradicate their intrinsic morality" and pointed to Bubs' arc as showcasing the barriers to trans healthcare that exist under capitalism. Kambole Campbell of Polygon notes that "one of the film's most striking elements is its casual multiculturalism. Characters from presumably dissolved nations speak to each other in a mix of their native languages, while English mostly appears as the language of power and of the film's white antagonists."

== Production ==
=== Development ===
The early working title of the film was Lightning Arc (번개호; Beongaeho).

Jo Sung-hee started writing the story 10 years prior to the film's release, after a friend talked to him about the dangers of space junk. He said that "It started with the idea of space travelers collecting space junk. I heard about how these fast-moving fragments of space debris are growing and leading to in-space collisions. I realized that this subject has already been dealt with in animations and games, but never in a film. I started writing the script wondering how Koreans, who possess a tenacious mentality, would approach this problem."

In May 2019, the Chinese multinational entertainment company Huayi Tencent invested $4.2 million in the film. The visual effects company Dexter Studios, which was behind the production of the films Along with the Gods: The Two Worlds, Ashfall and Wandering Earth, was hired for Space Sweepers.

=== Casting ===
In June 2018, it was reported that Song Joong-ki agreed to star in Jo Sung-hee's next film, making it their second collaboration after A Werewolf Boy (2012). Kim Tae-ri was offered the role of the spaceship captain in January 2019, followed by Jin Seon-kyu for the role of the keeper in April. The final lineup was confirmed in June 2019, with Yoo Hae-jin joining the main cast in the form of robotic motion capture and voice acting. English actor Richard Armitage also revealed through his Instagram account that he would start filming in July 2019, making Space Sweepers his first Korean film.

=== Filming ===
Principal photography began on July 3, 2019, and filming was completed on November 2.

== Release ==
In June 2020, it was announced that the release was postponed due to the COVID-19 pandemic with a plan for the film to premiere during the Chuseok holiday. In August 2020, the release was once again postponed due to the increase of COVID-19 cases in South Korea.

In November 2020, it was announced that the film would be released exclusively on Netflix. Space Sweepers was released on February 5, 2021.

In May 2021, a sequel was announced.

== Reception ==
=== Audience viewership ===
The film debuted at No.1 on Netflix in 16 countries including France, Malaysia, Croatia, South Korea and Philippines. The movie also dominated Netflix's daily top 10 rankings in 80 countries upon its premiere. Space Sweepers also gathered more than 26 million household viewers on Netflix during the first 28 days of its release or 53,340,000 hours watched.

=== Critical response ===
On the review aggregation website Rotten Tomatoes, the film holds an approval rating of 69% based on 26 reviews, with an average rating of 6.7/10. The site's critics consensus reads, "As a story, Space Sweepers isn't as adventurous as its star-navigating protagonists -- but relatable characters and impressive effects keep it from drifting out of orbit." On Metacritic, it has a weighted average score of 64 out of 100, based on reviews from 4 critics, indicating "generally favorable reviews".

Zaki Hasan of IGN argued that "even as [the film is] a concoction of various familiar sci-fi tropes, they've been reassembled with verve and passion enough to sand down any cynicism when taking it all in." Dais Johnston of Inverse argued that the film "proves that Netflix's big bet on international audiences is paying off." Gavia Baker-Whitelaw of The Daily Dot compared the film to Cowboy Bebop and Guardians of the Galaxy, arguing that the film was "hardly groundbreaking stuff" but that "there's always something fun to look at on-screen", and praising the diversity of the characters, stating that the film "feels far more international than most Hollywood blockbusters." Karen Han of Slate stated that the film was "one of the rare space operas that doesn't posit that English has somehow become a universal language" and that Bubs' arc "feels like one small step for transgender representation and, arguably, a giant one for blockbuster filmmaking from any nation."

== Adaptations ==
A webtoon based on the film premiered on May 26, 2020, on Daum and KakaoPage. It premiered globally on February 8, 2021.

== Awards and nominations ==
Year	Award	Category	Recipient	Result	Ref.
2021	57th Baeksang Arts Awards	Technical award	Jang Geun-young (Art)	Nominated	
2021	57th Baeksang Arts Awards	Technical award	Jeong Seong-jin, Jong Chol-min (Visual effects)	Won	
2021	26th Chunsa Film Art Awards	Best Actor	Song Joong-ki	Won	
2021	26th Chunsa Film Art Awards	Best Director	Jo Sung-hee	Won	
2021	26th Chunsa Film Art Awards	Technical Award (Visual effects)	Park Dae-hoon, Jeong Seong-jin	Nominated	
2021	30th Buil Film Awards	Best Cinematography Award	Byun Bong-sun	Nominated	
2021	30th Buil Film Awards	Best Music Award	Kim Tae-seong	Nominated	
2021	30th Buil Film Awards	Best Art/Technical Award	Jeong Seong-jin, Jeong Chol-min (VFX)	Won	
2021	42nd Blue Dragon Film Awards	Best Film	Space Sweepers	Nominated	
2021	42nd Blue Dragon Film Awards	Best Director	Jo Sung-hee	Nominated	
2021	42nd Blue Dragon Film Awards	Best Actor	Song Joong-ki	Nominated	
2021	42nd Blue Dragon Film Awards	Popular Star Award	Song Joong-ki	Won	
2021	42nd Blue Dragon Film Awards	Best Supporting Actor	Jin Seon-kyu	Nominated	
2021	42nd Blue Dragon Film Awards	Best Cinematography	Byun Bong-sun	Nominated	
2021	42nd Blue Dragon Film Awards	Best Editing Award	Nam Na-young	Nominated	
2021	42nd Blue Dragon Film Awards	Best Art Direction	Jang Geun-young	Nominated	
2021	42nd Blue Dragon Film Awards	Technical Award	Jeong Seong-jin, Jeong Chol-min (VFX)	Won	
2021	University Film Festival of Korea	Film of the Year	Space Sweepers	Won	
2022	Nebula Awards	Ray Bradbury Nebula Award for Outstanding Dramatic Presentation	Jo Sung-hee	Nominated	
2022	Hugo Awards	Best Dramatic Presentation, Long Form	Jo Sung-hee	Nominated	
