= Shin Il-ryong =

South Korean actor and entrepreneur (1948–2022)

- Born: Cho Su-hyun; 17 October 1948; Seoul, South Korea
- Died: 26 May 2022 (aged 73)
- Education: Korea University
- Occupations: Actor; entrepreneur

Cho Su-hyun (Korean: 신일룡; 17 October 1948 – 26 May 2022) was a South Korean actor and entrepreneur. He won a Blue Dragon Film Award in the category Best New Actor for his performance in the film Long Live the Island Frogs.

Shin died on 26 May 2022, of liver cancer, at the age of 73.
