= 49th Baeksang Arts Awards =

2013 edition of award ceremony

- Date: May 9, 2013
- Site: Kyung Hee University's Peace Palace Hall in Seoul
- Hosted by: Oh Sang-jin; Kim Ah-joong; Joo Won

Television coverage
- Network: jTBC

The 49th Baeksang Arts Awards ceremony was held at Kyung Hee University's Peace Palace Hall in Seoul on 9 May 2013, and broadcast on jTBC. Presented by IS Plus Corp., it was hosted by announcer Oh Sang-jin, actress Kim Ah-joong, and actor Joo Won.

== Nominations and winners ==
Complete list of nominees and winners:

(Winners denoted in bold)

=== Film ===
Grand Prize (Film)
**Ryu Seung-ryong – Miracle in Cell No. 7**
Best Film	Best Screenplay
**Masquerade**; The Berlin File; Miracle in Cell No. 7; Pietà; A Werewolf Boy	**Jung Byung-gil** – **Confession of Murder**; Heo Sung-hye, Min Kyu-dong – All About My Wife; Jo Sung-hee – A Werewolf Boy; Lee Hwan-kyung, Kim Hwang-sung, Kim Young-suk – Miracle in Cell No. 7; Park Hoon-jung – New World
Best Actor (Film)	Best Actress (Film)
**Ha Jung-woo – The Berlin File as Pyo Jong-seong**; Hwang Jung-min – New World as Jung Chung; Lee Byung-hun – Masquerade as King Gwanghae/Ha-sun; Ryu Seung-ryong – Miracle in Cell No. 7 as Lee Yong-gu; Song Joong-ki – A Werewolf Boy as Chul-soo	**Kim Min-hee** – **Very Ordinary Couple as Jang Young**; Han Hyo-joo – Love 911 as Mi-soo; Im Soo-jung – All About My Wife as Yeon Jung-in; Jo Min-su – Pietà as Jang Mi-sun; Lee Jung-hyun – Juvenile Offender as Hyo-seung
Best Supporting Actor (Film)	Best Supporting Actress (Film)
**Ma Dong-seok** – **The Neighbor as Ahn Hyuk-mo**; Cho Jin-woong – Perfect Number as Jo Min-beom; Oh Dal-su – Miracle in Cell No. 7 as So Yang-ho; Park Sung-woong – New World as Lee Joong-gu; Ryu Seung-ryong – All About My Wife as Jang Sung-ki	**Jo Eun-ji** – **The Concubine as Geum-ok**; Jun Ji-hyun – The Thieves as Yenicall; Moon Jeong-hee – Deranged as Gyung-seon; Park Shin-hye – Miracle in Cell No. 7 as adult Ye-sung; Shin So-yul – My PS Partner as So-yeon
Best New Actor (Film)	Best New Actress (Film)
**Ji Dae-han** – **A Wonderful Moment as Young-gwang**; Do Ji-han – The Tower as Lee Seon-woo; Im Seulong – 26 Years as Kwon Jung-hyuk; Kim Bum – The Gifted Hands as Kim Joon; Seo Young-joo – Juvenile Offender as Jang Ji-gu	**Han Ye-ri** – **As One as Yu Sun-bok**; Jung Eun-chae – Nobody's Daughter Haewon as Haewon; Kal So-won – Miracle in Cell No. 7 as Ye-sung; Kim Go-eun – A Muse as Han Eun-gyo; Nam Bo-ra – Don't Cry, Mommy as Eun-ah
Best Director (Film)	Best New Director (Film)
**Choo Chang-min** – **Masquerade**; Choi Dong-hoon – The Thieves; Kim Ki-duk – Pietà; Min Kyu-dong – All About My Wife; Ryoo Seung-wan – The Berlin File	**Jo Sung-hee** – **A Werewolf Boy**; Cho Geun-hyun – 26 Years; Kim Hwi – The Neighbor; Moon Hyun-sung – As One; Park Hoon-jung – New World
Most Popular – Actor (Film)	Most Popular – Actress (Film)
**Kim Dong-wan** – **Deranged as Jae-pil**	**Park Shin-hye** – **Miracle in Cell No. 7 as adult Ye-sung**

=== Television ===
Grand Prize (Television)	Best Drama
**Yoo Jae-suk** – **Infinite Challenge**	**The Chaser**; Lights and Shadows; My Husband Got a Family; School 2013; How Long I've Kissed
Best Educational Program	Best Entertainment Program
**A Korean's Dinner Table**; Superfish; Food X-Files; The Last Empire; Kingmaker	**Dad! Where Are We Going?**; National Team; Hello Counselor; Law of the Jungle; Healing Camp, Aren't You Happy
Best Director (Television)	Best Screenplay (Television)
**Kim Kyu-tae** – **That Winter, the Wind Blows**; Jo Nam-kook – The Chaser; Kim Hyung-suk – My Husband Got a Family; Kwon Seok-jang, Lee Yoon-jung – Golden Time; Lee Joo-hwan – Lights and Shadows	**Park Kyung-soo** – **The Chaser**; Choi Hee-ra – Golden Time; Ha Myung-hee – Can We Get Married?; Lee Woo-jung – Reply 1997; Park Ji-eun – My Husband Got a Family
Best Actor (Television)	Best Actress (Television)
**Son Hyun-joo – The Chaser as Detective Baek Hong-suk**; Lee Sang-yoon – Seoyoung, My Daughter as Kang Woo-jae; Lee Sung-min – Golden Time as Choi In-hyuk; Uhm Tae-woong – Man from the Equator as Kim Sun-woo; Yoo Jun-sang – My Husband Got a Family as Terry Kang/Bang Gwi-nam	**Kim Hee-ae – How Long I've Kissed as Yoon Seo-rae**; Kim Nam-joo – My Husband Got a Family as Cha Yoon-hee; Kim Sung-ryung – King of Ambition as Baek Do-kyung; Lee Bo-young – Seoyoung, My Daughter as Lee Seo-young; Song Hye-kyo – That Winter, the Wind Blows as Oh Young
Best New Actor (Television)	Best New Actress (Television)
**Lee Hee-joon – My Husband Got a Family as Chun Jae-yong**; Kim Woo-bin – School 2013 as Park Heung-soo; Jo Jung-suk – The King 2 Hearts as Eun Shi-kyung; Lee Jung-shin – Seoyoung, My Daughter as Kang Sung-jae; Seo In-guk – Reply 1997 as Yoon Yoon-jae	**Jung Eun-ji – Reply 1997 as Sung Shi-won**; Choi Yoon-young – Seoyoung, My Daughter as Choi Ho-jung; Lee Yu-bi – The Innocent Man as Kang Choco; Park Se-young – Faith as Princess Noguk; Yoon Jin-yi – A Gentleman's Dignity as Im Me Ah-ri
Best Variety Performer – Male	Best Variety Performer – Female
**Kim Byung-man – Law of the Jungle**; Kim Jun-ho – Gag Concert; Yoo Jae-suk – Running Man, Infinite Challenge; Cultwo – Hello Counselor; Heo Kyung-hwan – Gag Concert	**Shin Bo-ra – Gag Concert**; Song Ji-hyo – Running Man; Lee Young-ja – Hello Counselor; Kim Ji-min – Gag Concert; Han Hye-jin – Healing Camp, Aren't You Happy
Most Popular – Actor (Television)	Most Popular – Actress (Television)
**Park Yoochun – Missing You as Han Jung-woo**	**Kwon Yuri – Fashion King as Choi Anna**
