= Hopeless (2023 film) =

2023 South Korean film

- Theatrical release poster
- Hangul: 화란
- Hanja: 禍亂
- RR: Hwaran
- MR: Hwaran
- Directed by: Kim Chang-hoon
- Written by: Kim Chang-hoon
- Produced by: Han Jae-duk
- Starring: Hong Xa-bin; Song Joong-ki; Kim Hyeong-seo
- Cinematography: Lee Jae-woo
- Edited by: Kim Sang-bum
- Music by: Nene Kang
- Production companies: Sanai Pictures; HighZium Studio; Megabox Plus M
- Distributed by: Megabox Plus M
- Release dates: May 24, 2023 (Cannes); October 11, 2023 (South Korea)
- Running time: 133 minutes
- Country: South Korea
- Language: Korean
- Budget: US$2.9 million
- Box office: US$1.9 million

Hopeless (Korean: 화란; RR: Hwaran) is a 2023 South Korean neo-noir thriller film written and directed by Kim Chang-hoon, marking Hong Xa-bin's film debut. It also stars Song Joong-ki and Kim Hyeong-seo. The film follows Yeon-gyu (Hong Xa-bin), a teenage boy desperate to escape his hellish reality. When he encounters Chi-geon (Song Joong-ki), a middle-ranking member of a local gang, Yeon-gyu becomes drawn into the world of crime.

Hopeless premiered in the Un Certain Regard section at the 2023 Cannes Film Festival. It was released theatrically in South Korea on October 11, 2023.

== Plot ==
Yeon-gyu is an 18-year-old boy living in a poor neighborhood on the outskirts of Seoul with his mother Mo-kyung, his stepsister Ha-yan, and his abusive stepfather Jeong-deok. He dreams of escaping his circumstances and moving to the Netherlands with his mother, which he regards as a place where people from different backgrounds can live together peacefully. However, Mo-kyung has become apathetic after years of abuse and does not share his desire to leave. Yeon-gyu therefore remains trapped in his home life and is frequently subjected to violence.

At school, Yeon-gyu is bullied along with Ha-yan. After seeing Ha-yan being attacked, he retaliates by striking one of her tormentors with a stone, seriously injuring him. Yeon-gyu is required to pay for the resulting medical expenses but has little money. He works delivering food to save money for his planned escape, but is unable to earn enough to resolve the situation.

Yeon-gyu comes to the attention of Chi-geon, a middle-ranking member of a local criminal organization involved in loan sharking and other illegal activities. Chi-geon gives Yeon-gyu the money he needs, initially without demanding anything in return. Having grown up with an abusive father himself, Chi-geon sympathizes with Yeon-gyu and begins to take an interest in him. Yeon-gyu subsequently becomes involved with Chi-geon's organization, believing that the gang may provide him with a means of escaping his current life.

Yeon-gyu begins working for the gang and gradually gains Chi-geon's trust. Chi-geon becomes a surrogate older-brother figure to him, teaching him how to survive within the criminal world. At the same time, Yeon-gyu becomes increasingly uncomfortable with the violence and exploitation carried out by the organization, particularly when its activities harm people from the same impoverished community he hopes to escape. The gang is also involved in local politics and uses intimidation and violence to support its preferred political candidate. As Yeon-gyu becomes more deeply involved, he is ordered to carry out increasingly dangerous tasks. Although Chi-geon attempts to protect him, he also insists that Yeon-gyu obey the organization's orders without question. Their relationship becomes increasingly strained as Yeon-gyu begins to recognize that the life Chi-geon offers him is another form of confinement.

Ha-yan becomes increasingly concerned about Yeon-gyu's involvement with the gang. Unlike Chi-geon, who tries to help Yeon-gyu by teaching him to survive through violence, Ha-yan accepts him without asking him to become someone else. After Yeon-gyu is ordered to kill a political candidate who has withdrawn his support from the gang's organization, he is unable to reconcile the order with his conscience. His conflict with Chi-geon eventually becomes violent, culminating in Yeon-gyu killing him. Yeon-gyu then returns home and finds Mo-kyung badly injured after another beating by Jeong-deok. He takes Ha-yan and flees the neighborhood with her on a motorcycle, leaving behind the criminal world he had entered in an attempt to escape his circumstances.

== Cast ==
- Hong Xa-bin as Yeon-gyu
- Song Joong-ki as Chi-geon
- Kim Hyeong-seo as Ha-yan
- Jung Jae-kwang as Seung-mu
- Jung Man-sik as the owner of the Chinese restaurant
- Park Bo-kyung as Mo-kyung, Yeon-gyu's mother
- Kim Jong-soo as Joong-beom, the boss of the organization

== Release ==
Hopeless premiered in the Un Certain Regard section at the 2023 Cannes Film Festival on May 24, 2023. It was also invited to the 28th Busan International Film Festival in 'Korean Cinema Today - Special Premiere' section.

== Reception ==
=== Box office ===
According to the Korean Film Council's integrated computer network, the film grossed US$1,872,156 at the local box office and accumulated 264,050 admissions from 976 screens.

=== Accolades ===
Award ceremony	Year	Category	Recipient(s)	Result	Ref.
Baeksang Arts Awards	2024	Best New Director	Kim Chang-hoon	Nominated	
Baeksang Arts Awards	2024	Best Supporting Actor	Song Joong-ki	Nominated	
Baeksang Arts Awards	2024	Best New Actor	Hong Xa-bin	Nominated	
Baeksang Arts Awards	2024	Best New Actress	Kim Hyeong-seo	Won	
Blue Dragon Film Awards	2023	Best Supporting Actor	Song Joong-ki	Nominated	
Blue Dragon Film Awards	2023	Best New Actor	Hong Xa-bin	Won	
Blue Dragon Film Awards	2023	Best New Actress	Kim Hyeong-seo	Nominated	
Blue Dragon Film Awards	2023	Best New Director	Kim Chang-hoon	Nominated	
Buil Film Awards	2024	Best Supporting Actor	Song Joong-ki	Won	
Buil Film Awards	2024	Best New Actor	Hong Xa-bin	Nominated	
Buil Film Awards	2024	Best New Actress	Kim Hyeong-seo	Nominated	
Cannes Film Festival	2023	Un Certain Regard	Kim Chang-hoon	Nominated	
Director's Cut Awards	2024	Best New Actor	Hong Xa-bin	Won	
Korean Association of Film Critics Awards	2024	Best New Actress	Kim Hyeong-seo	Won	
London East Asia Film Festival	2023	Rising Star Award	Hong Xa-bin	Won	
Red Sea International Film Festival	2023	Film AlUla Audience Award (Non-Saudi Film)	Hopeless	Won	
