= Rabin Angeles =

Filipino actor (born 2004)

- Born: Rabin Josh Macarayo Angeles; November 14, 2004 (age 21); Angeles, Pampanga, Philippines
- Education: Holy Angel University
- Occupations: Actor; singer; dancer
- Years active: 2023–present
- Agent: Viva Artists Agency
- Website: Rabin Angeles

Rabin Josh Macarayo Angeles (born November 14, 2004), is a Filipino actor, singer and dancer recognized for his breakout role as Yuri Hanamitchi in the hit Philippine romantic-comedy series Ang Mutya ng Section E.

== Early life ==
Rabin Josh Angeles was born in Pampanga, Philippines, and is the youngest of three siblings. His father died when he was four years old. Angeles graduated high school from Holy Angel University in Pampanga.

== Career ==
=== Debut ===
Discovered by film director Jason Paul Laxamana, Angeles began his acting career in 2023 with supporting roles in projects such as the boys' love series The Day I Loved You and the action-fantasy film Penduko.

His first guest appearance in music videos was in 2023 in "Scarlet" by Marielle Belleza.

=== Breakthrough ===
In 2024, he was cast as Yuri Hanamitchi, a Filipino-Japanese second lead in the Viva One series Ang Mutya ng Section E. The role, which required him to dye his hair bright red, showcased his willingness to transform physically and emotionally for his characters. The series garnered significant attention.

He won the Excellence Award for Television Actor at the 3rd Laurus Nobilis Media Awards – For his role in Ang Mutya ng Section E.

Angeles appeared alongside co-star Ashtine Olviga in the music video for Earl Agustin’s chart-topping single "Tibok", which debuted on April 9, 2025. The video contributed to the song’s success, which reached No. 1 on the Billboard Philippines Hot 100. He released his rendition of the song on music streaming platforms on April 14, 2025.

Since May 23, 2025, Angeles has been a guest host on the noontime variety show Eat Bulaga! on TV5, appearing every Friday.

=== Endorsement and Ventures ===
In 2025, Angeles marketed for The Green Flavonoid skincare line by The Lab by Blanc Doux, a South Korean brand distributed by Viva Beauty in the Philippines. He also endorsed Yogorino, a popular dessert brand. Additionally, he launched his own fragrance line, Bin Perfume on April 23, 2025.

Angeles was named as the first Filipino endorser of Botejyu, a Japanese restaurant chain in the country. The announcement happened at a campaign event on June 17, 2025.

== Filmography ==
=== Film ===
Key
†	Denotes films that have not yet been released

Year	Title	Role	Ref.
2023	Baby Boy, Baby Girl	Anjo	
2023	The Ship Show	Buddy	
2023	Instant Daddy	Winston	
2023	Penduko	OJ	
2026	A Werewolf Boy	Boy	

=== Television / Digital ===
Year	Title	Role	Notes	Ref.
2023	The Day I Loved You	Justin		
2025	Ang Mutya ng Section E	Yuri Hanamitchi		
2025	Eat Bulaga!	Himself (Note: as guest host, appears on Fridays)		
2025	Seducing Drake Palma	Drake Sebastian Palma		
2026	Viva One Originals: RabGel		Episodes: "Ang Rider kong Hudlum", "Us, Maybe", Same Day Error	
2026	Dating Alys Perez	Drake Sebastian Palma		

=== Music Videos ===
==== As guest appearance ====
Year	Title	Artist	Ref.
2023	"Scarlet"	Marielle Belleza	
2023	"Darating"	Martin Venegas	
2025	"Tibok"	Earl Agustin	
2025	"Pikit Mata"	Janine	

== Discography ==
Title	Year	Album	Ref.
"Tibok" (Note: Earl Agustin cover)	2025	Non-album single	
"Bahalahanap" (Note: duet with Angela Muji; mashed up cover of songs Bahala Na and Hanap Hanap by James Reid and Nadine Lustre)	2025	Non-album single	
