= Long Live the Island Frogs =

1972 film

- Film poster
- Hangul: 섬 개구리 만세
- Hanja: 섬 개구리 萬歲
- RR: Seom gaeguri manse
- MR: Sŏm kaeguri manse
- Directed by: Jung Jin-woo
- Written by: Seo In-kyung; Yu Dong-hun
- Produced by: Jung Jin-woo
- Starring: Joo Sun-tae; Shin Il-ryong
- Cinematography: Yoo Jae-hyung
- Edited by: Kim Hui-su
- Music by: Han Sang-gi
- Production company: Woo-jin Films
- Release date: 18 April 1972
- Running time: 98 minutes
- Country: South Korea
- Language: Korean

Long Live the Island Frogs (Korean: 섬 개구리 만세) is a 1972 South Korean drama film directed by Jung Jin-woo. It was entered into the 23rd Berlin International Film Festival.

== Cast ==
- Joo Sun-tae
- Shin Il-ryong
