= Seducing Drake Palma =

2025 Philippine teen romantic comedy television series

- Promotional poster
- Genre: Teen; Romantic comedy
- Based on: Seducing Drake Palma by Ariesa Jane Domingo
- Directed by: Crisanto Aquino
- Starring: Rabin Angeles; Angela Muji
- Country of origin: Philippines
- Original language: Filipino
- No. of seasons: 2
- No. of episodes: 16

Production
- Editor: Itzabella Hernandez Pena
- Running time: 45–50 minutes
- Production company: Studio Viva

Original release
- Network: Viva One
- Release: June 15 – September 26, 2025

Seducing Drake Palma is a Philippine teen romantic comedy television series directed by Crisanto Aquino and starring Rabin Angeles and Angela Muji. Produced by Studio Viva, based on the Wattpad novel Seducing Drake Palma by Ariesa Jane Domingo a.k.a as beeyotch . The series premiered on Viva One on June 15, 2025 to September 26, 2025.

== Premise ==
Alys, a bubbly girl who agrees to seduce the mysterious Drake Palma to help her best friend. But as their pretend relationship starts to feel real, Alys is torn between loyalty and unexpected love.

== Cast and characters ==
- Rabin Angeles as Drake Sebastian Palma
- Angela Muji as Alys Zyril Perez
- Dylan Menor as Tripp Marco Palma
- Yumi Garcia as Aya Pineda
- Frost Sandoval as Kent Valdez
- Ethan David as Sheen Mendoza
- Rafa Victorino as Kei Chui
- Sara Joe as Shaira Silos
- Mark Anthony Fernandez as Steve Palma
- Denise Esteban as Katrina Palma
- Nikka Ruiz as Dana Ferrer
- Christopher Roxas as Andy Guzman
- Lander Vera Perez as Cyriel Perez

== Episodes ==
No.	Title	Original release date
1	"The Mission"	June 15, 2025
Alys Perez agrees to make the mysterious Drake Palma her fake boyfriend to help her best friend Sheen win back her ex. But things get messy when feelings get involved she realizes that her mission might be harder than she thought.
2	"Drakey Baby"	June 20, 2025
Alys celebrates securing Drake as her “boyfriend,” but things spiral fast—rumors, rival girls, and one shocking discovery. When she sees Drake and his glamorous stepmom Katrina getting suspiciously close, Alys starts to wonder what is he hiding?
3	"Ball Date"	June 27, 2025
Alys promises the whole school she’s going to the acquaintance party with Drake—problem is, he said no. Desperate, she turns to her best friend Sheen for help. But just when she thinks her hopes are all out, someone unexpected shows up.
4	"Stuck with You"	July 4, 2025
At St. Collete High’s acquaintance party, Alys deals with crushes, drama, and one unexpected moment with Drake Palma. But when a cruel prank leaves her trapped overnight, she wakes up the next morning—shocked to find Drake carrying her home.
5	"Kiss Me"	July 11, 2025
After getting grounded, Alys just wants to lay low—but Drake keeps showing up. From tense study sessions to surprise moments, things start to shift between them. She’s not sure what’s happening… but her heart might already know.
6	"I'm Territorial"	July 18, 2025
Amid wedding rehearsals, Alys finds herself spending more time with Drake. A spontaneous mall date turns unexpectedly personal, blurring the line between playful and intimate as their connection quietly deepens.
7	"Love and Lies"	July 25, 2025
At Steve and Katrina’s wedding, Alys tries to keep her cool around Drake but a surprise encounter leaves her shaken. Aya catches unexpected feelings, Kei makes a bold request, and Sheen faces closure. Love blooms, secrets stir, and hearts are on the line.
8	"My Noob"	August 1, 2025
As Drake moves out and Alys deals with failing her entrance exam, their world shifts fast. New dreams, tough choices, and one unforgettable kiss push everyone to grow up, hold on, or let go. But noob or not, Alys is all in for love, life, and Drake Palma.
9	"Jealousy"	August 8, 2025
On her first day at Brenford, Alys meets Tripp, a funny, unpredictable guy who might just shake things up. But when Drake sees her with someone else, emotions stir. New schools, new friendships, and a hint of jealousy set the stage for what’s next.
10	"Calm Before the Storm"	August 15, 2025
Alys plans a perfect day with Drake, but everything spirals when an unexpected girl from his past arrives claiming more than just history. As jealousy brews and loyalties blur, Alys must decide whether to trust her heart or walk away.
11	"Four Down, One to Go"	August 22, 2025
What was supposed to be a fun theme park day with Tripp turns into total drama when Alys finds out he’s Drake’s cousin—then faces the truth about her messy love life. Secrets, heartbreak, and a brutal choice… stay or walk away?
12	"Seulement Vous"	August 29, 2025
Alys finally drops her guard, letting Drake see the real her. But just as they find their rhythm, an unexpected curveball threatens to undo everything, testing if what they have is worth the fight.
13	"The Debutant"	September 5, 2025
At her 18th birthday, Alys steps into the spotlight, but old wounds and fresh drama threaten to steal the night. Between family tensions and matters of the heart, she faces moments that could change everything.
14	"Exes Next Door"	September 12, 2025
Alys moves into her dream condo-right next to Drake. Awkward run-ins, Tripp's charm, and a late-night dinner lead to a charged moment that blurs the line between moving on and falling back, reigniting emotions she thought she'd left behind.
15	"Secret Lover"	September 19, 2025
Alys is caught in a whirlwind of emotions as Drake, Tripp, and shifting affections pull her in different directions. With jealousy in the air and hearts on the line, she's forced to confront her feelings and decide where her heart truly belongs.
16	"Endings and Beginnings"	September 26, 2025
Alys and Drake’s love is pushed to the edge as tensions with Tripp and Shaira grow. Passion and jealousy swirl around them, testing their trust. When the final choice comes, will their love survive or be lost to the tangled web they’ve spun?

== Production ==
The series was announced by Studio Viva. It is based on the Ariesa Jane Domingo Wattpad novel titled "Mission Impossible: Seducing Drake Palma". Rabin Angeles, Angela Muji and Dylan Menor was cast to appear in the series. It marks the second collaboration between Angeles and Muji after Ang Mutya ng Section E. Principal photography of the series commenced in May 2025.

== Soundtrack ==
Seducing Drake Palma

Soundtrack album by Various artists
- Released: June 13, 2025
- Genres: Romance; Soundtrack
- Length: 22:12
- Language: Filipino
- Label: Viva Records

"Nahanap Kita" is the theme song of Drake and Alys sung by Amiel Sol.

Tracklisting
No.	Title	Singer(s)	Length
1.	"Pag-ibig ng Ikaw at Ako"	Earl Agustin	4:40
2.	"Nahanap Kita"	Amiel Sol	5:17
3.	"Multo"	Cup of Joe	3:57
4.	"Dito Sa'kin"	Earl Agustin	5:30
5.	"Sugar Sugar"	Sugar N' Spice	2:45
Total length:			22:12

== Release ==
The series was made available to stream exclusively on Viva One on June 14, 2025. The series consists of 16 episodes. For TV broadcast, Seducing Drake Palma premiered on TV5 on July 21, 2025, as part of the network’s short-lived Primetime Primera evening block. It aired every Monday to Friday at 6:45 PM (PST) and concluded on October 3, 2025, with a total of 55 episodes for its TV version, replacing Ang Mutya ng Section E.

== See also ==
- List of shows produced by Studio Viva
