= Bogotá: City of the Lost =

2024 South Korean crime drama film

- Theatrical release poster
- Hangul: 보고타: 마지막 기회의 땅
- RR: Bogota: majimak gihoeui ttang
- MR: Pogot'a: majimak kihoeŭi ttang
- Directed by: Kim Seong-je
- Written by: Hwang Seong-gu; Kim Seong-je
- Produced by: Shin Beom-su; Park Seong-il
- Starring: Song Joong-ki; Lee Hee-joon; Kwon Hae-hyo; Park Ji-hwan; Cho Hyun-chul; Kim Jong-soo
- Cinematography: Lee Seong-jae; Hwang Gi-seok
- Edited by: Kim Sun-min
- Music by: Jeong Hyun-su
- Production companies: Watermelon Pictures; Idioplan
- Distributed by: Megabox Plus M
- Release dates: October 3, 2024 (BIFF); December 31, 2024 (South Korea)
- Running time: 108 minutes
- Country: South Korea
- Languages: Korean; Spanish
- Budget: US$8.6 million
- Box office: US$2.7 million

Bogotá: City of the Lost (Korean: 보고타: 마지막 기회의 땅) is a 2024 South Korean crime drama film co-written and directed by Kim Seong-je, starring Song Joong-ki, Lee Hee-joon and Kwon Hae-hyo. It tells the story of immigrants who start dangerous deals to survive in Bogotá, the last land for their hopeless lives.

The film premiered at the 29th Busan International Film Festival in October 3, 2024. It was released theatrically on December 31, 2024.

== Plot ==
Unable to escape the aftermath of the 1997 Asian financial crisis, 19-year-old Guk-hee moves to Bogotá with his family, wishing for a better life only to end up living from hand to mouth. To survive in this unfamiliar land, Guk-hee starts working under Sergeant Park, who holds power in the Korean Merchants' Association. Catching Park's eye with his diligence, Guk-hee is tasked with participating in a smuggling operation for clothing as part of a test.

Amid a life-threatening crisis where Colombian customs nearly apprehend them, Guk-hee risks his life to protect Sergeant Park's goods, leaving a lasting impression not only on Park but also on Soo-yeong, a customs broker. Soon, Soo-yeong makes Guk-hee a dangerous proposal. Realizing that his choices can change the landscape of the Korean community in Bogotá, Guk-hee begins to yearn for even greater success.

== Cast ==
- Song Joong-ki as Guk-hee
- Lee Hee-joon as Soo-yeong
- Kwon Hae-hyo as Sergeant Park Jang-soo
- Park Ji-hwan as Junior Boss Park
- Cho Hyun-chul as Jae-woong
- Kim Jong-soo as Guk-hee's father

== Production ==
Filming began in January 2020, in Bogotá, Colombia, but in March, due to the COVID-19 pandemic, production was halted after completing about 40% of the filming. After that, the production team reorganized the entire production and resumed filming in Korea in June 2021.

On July 2, 2021, it was reported that the filming was temporary suspended after it was confirmed that Song Joong-ki had been in contact with a COVID-19 confirmed person from the outside. Actor tested negative but was self-isolated per protocol. On July 15, filming resumed after Song completed self-quarantine.

Filming concluded in October 2021.

== Accolades ==
| Award | Date of ceremony | Category | Recipient(s) | Result | Ref. |
|---|---|---|---|---|---|
| Korean Film Producers Association Awards | December 18, 2025 | Best Supporting Actor | Kwon Hae-hyo | Won | |
