= Reborn Rich =

2022 South Korean television series

- Promotional poster
- Hangul: 재벌집 막내아들
- Lit.: The Youngest Son of a Conglomerate
- RR: Jaebeoljip mangnaeadeul
- MR: Chaebŏljip mangnaeadŭl
- Genre: Fantasy; Period; Revenge
- Based on: The Youngest Son of a Conglomerate by San Gyung
- Written by: Kim Tae-hee; Jang Eun-jae
- Directed by: Jung Dae-yoon
- Starring: Song Joong-ki; Lee Sung-min; Shin Hyun-been
- Music by: Jeon Chang-yeop
- Country of origin: South Korea
- Original language: Korean
- No. of episodes: 16

Production
- Executive producers: Ahn Hyun-sook; Lee Ye-seul
- Producers: Kim Dong-rae; Park Seong-eun
- Running time: 60–87 minutes
- Production companies: SLL; RaemongRaein; The Youngest Son of a Conglomerate SPC
- Budget: ₩30~35 billion

Original release
- Network: JTBC
- Release: November 18 – December 25, 2022

Reborn Rich (Korean: 재벌집 막내아들) is a South Korean television series adapted from the original web novel of the same name, starring Song Joong-ki, Lee Sung-min, and Shin Hyun-been. It aired on JTBC from November 18 to December 25, 2022, every Friday to Sunday at 22:30 (KST). It is also available for streaming on TVING, Netflix and Disney+ in South Korea, and on Viu and Viki in selected territories.

Reborn Rich received audience acclaim and became the second highest-rated series in Korean cable television history, with its final episode recording 26.9% nationwide ratings. A second season has been confirmed in production.

== Synopsis ==
The series tells the story of Yoon Hyun-woo (Song Joong-ki), a loyal higher-up employee working for the chaebol (conglomerate) Soonyang Group owned by the Jin family. After he was murdered by a member of the Jin family to cover up a tax evasion scheme, Hyun-woo wakes up and discovers that he has gone back in time to 1987 and reincarnated into the body of Jin Do-jun, the youngest grandson. Using these circumstances to his advantage, he starts his revenge by plotting a hostile takeover of Soonyang Group.

== Cast ==
=== Main ===
- Song Joong-ki as Jin Do-jun / Yoon Hyun-woo
  - Kim Kang-hoon as young Jin Do-jun (in 1987)

Senior manager of the Future Asset Management Department in Soonyang Group who is killed by the Soonyang family.
Reborn as Jin Do-jun, Soonyang family's youngest grandson.

- Lee Sung-min as Jin Yang-chul

Head of the family and founder of Soonyang Group.

- Shin Hyun-been as Seo Min-young

A prosecutor at the Seoul Central District Prosecutors' Office. Member of an elite family with a long legacy in the legal profession.

=== Supporting ===
==== Jin family ====
- Yoon Je-moon as Jin Young-ki

Eldest son of the Soonyang family.

- Kim Jung-nan as Son Jung-dae

Jin Young-ki's wife. Daughter of a powerful money lender.

- Kim Nam-hee as Jin Seong-jun
  - Moon Seong-hyun as young Jin Seong-joon

Jin Young-ki's son. Eldest grandchild of the Soonyang family. Vice Chairman and heir of Soonyang Group.

- Park Ji-hyun as Mo Hyun-min

Jin Seong-jun's wife. Director of an art gallery and only daughter of the owner of Hyunsung Ilbo.

- Jo Han-chul as Jin Dong-ki

Second son of the Soonyang family.

- Seo Jae-hee as Yoo Ji-na

Jin Dong-ki's wife. Daughter of a former Minister of Economy and Finance.

- Jo Hye-joo as Jin Ye-jun

Jin Dong-ki's daughter. Only granddaughter of the Soonyang family.

- Kim Shin-rok as Jin Hwa-young

Third child and only daughter of the Soonyang family.

- Kim Do-hyun as Choi Chang-je

Jin Hwa-young's husband. A prosecutor with a poor family background.

- Kim Young-jae as Jin Yoon-ki

Jin Do-jun's father. Third son and the youngest and fourth child of the Soonyang family.

- Jung Hye-young as Lee Hae-in

Jin Do-jun's mother. A former top actress.

- Kang Ki-doong as Jin Hyung-jun
  - Cha Sung-je as young Jin Hyung-jun

Jin Do-jun's older brother. Second grandson of the Soonyang family.

- Kim Hyun as Lee Pil-ok

Jin Yang-chul's wife.

==== Soonyang Group ====
- Jung Hee-tae as Lee Hang-jae

Jin Yang-chul's right-hand man.

- Heo Jung-do as Kim Ju-ryeon

Jin Young-ki's secretary.

==== People around Jin Do-jun ====
- Park Hyuk-kwon as Oh Se-hyeon/Mason Oh

Jin Do-jun's business partner.

- Tiffany Young as Rachel

An analyst working with Oh Se-hyeon.

- Park Ji-hoon as Ha In-seok

Jin Do-jun's driver.

- Kim Jung-woo as Woo Byung-jun

A Soonyang employee who later works for Jin Do-jun.

=== Extended ===
- Kang Gil-woo as Baek Dong-min

Jin Dong-ki's loyal strategist.

- Lee Byung-joon as Ju Young-il

Chairman of Daeyoung Group.

- Lee Hwang-eui as Mo Young-bae

Mo Hyun-min's father. Owner of Hyunsung Ilbo.

- Ham Tae-in as Soonyang Group employee
- Jeon Jin-oh

=== Special appearance ===
- Park Jin-young as Shin Gyeong-min

An assistant manager and Yoon Hyun-woo's junior.

- Cha Sun-woo as Yoon Hyun-min

Yoon Hyun-woo's younger brother.

- Seo Jeong-yeon as Han Kyung-hee

Yoon Hyun-woo's mother.

- Lee Gyu-hee as Yoon Dong-su

Yoon Hyun-woo's father.

== Original soundtrack ==
=== Part 1 ===
Released on November 26, 2022
No.	Title	Lyrics	Music	Artist	Length
1.	"Gravity"	Zeenan; OneTop; J.Season	Zeenan; OneTop; J.Season	Jongho (Ateez)	3:03
2.	"Gravity" (Inst.)		Zeenan; OneTop; J.Season		3:03
Total length:					6:06

=== Part 2 ===
Released on November 28, 2022
No.	Title	Lyrics	Music	Artist	Length
1.	"Mother"	Zeenan; OneTop; J.Season	Zeenan; OneTop; J.Season	Shin Yong-jae (2F)	4:49
2.	"Mother" (Inst.)		Zeenan; OneTop; J.Season		4:49
Total length:					9:38

=== Part 3 ===
Released on December 3, 2022
No.	Title	Lyrics	Music	Artist	Length
1.	"I'm In Love With You" (너를 사랑하고 있어)	J.Season; Red Socks	J.Season; Red Socks; Kim Mi-seong	Seo Da-hyun (TripleS)	3:58
2.	"I'm In Love With You" (너를 사랑하고 있어; Inst.)		J.Season; Red Socks; Kim Mi-seong		3:58
Total length:					7:56

=== Part 4 ===
Released on December 10, 2022
No.	Title	Lyrics	Music	Artist	Length
1.	"Like a Star" (별처럼)	Oh Sung-hun; Hye Gaseo	Oh Sung-hun; OneTop	Moon Sua (Billlie)	3:35
2.	"Like a Star" (별처럼; Inst.)		Oh Sung-hun; OneTop		3:35
Total length:					7:10

=== Part 5 ===
Released on December 13, 2022
No.	Title	Lyrics	Music	Artist	Length
1.	"In The End"	Zeenan; OneTop; J.SEASON	Zeenan; OneTop; J.SEASON	Kim Woo-jin	4:00
2.	"In The End" (Inst.)		Zeenan; OneTop; J.SEASON		4:00
Total length:					8:00

=== Part 6 ===
Released on December 17, 2022
No.	Title	Lyrics	Music	Artist	Length
1.	"The Miracle" (기적 같은 너)	Kim Hee-jae	Ahn Soo-wan; J.SEASON	Paul Kim	4:17
2.	"The Miracle" (기적 같은 너; Inst.)		Ahn Soo-wan; J.SEASON		4:17
Total length:					8:34

=== Part 7 ===
Released on December 22, 2022
No.	Title	Lyrics	Music	Artist	Length
1.	"Love Me"	Cotton Breeze; Hye Gaseo	Cotton Breeze; Factist; Jossh	4Men	3:55
2.	"Love Me" (Inst.)		Cotton Breeze; Factist; Jossh		3:55
Total length:					8:10

== Reception ==
Although the drama series and its source material are fiction, it is set in South Korea's rapid industrialization and economic boom of the 1980s and 1990s and references real-life events such as the 1987 bombing of Korean Air Flight 858 and the 1997 Asian financial crisis. Critics noted that some of the plot lines, especially regarding business rivalries and succession battles, closely mirrored that of real-life notable chaebol families such as the Lee family (Samsung Group) and Chung family (Hyundai Group), further adding to the realism. Media critics and pop culture commentators surmised that the high viewer ratings could be attributed to the revenge plot line involving an employee with an ordinary background climbing to the top and the general public's curiosity about the mostly secretive chaebol families' lives.

=== Viewership ===
Reborn Rich : South Korea viewers per episode (millions)

Season	Episode number																Average
Season	1	2	3	4	5	6	7	8	9	10	11	12	13	14	15	16	Average
1	1.394	2.174	2.669	2.663	3.528	3.692	3.851	4.653	3.887	4.316	5.064	4.536	5.307	6.248	5.829	6.277	4.131

Source: Audience measurement performed nationwide by Nielsen Korea.

Average TV viewership ratings
Ep.	Original broadcast date	Average audience share (Nielsen Korea)	
Ep.	Original broadcast date	Nationwide	Seoul
1	November 18, 2022	6.058% (1st)	6.723% (1st)
2	November 19, 2022	8.845% (1st)	9.824% (1st)
3	November 20, 2022	10.826% (1st)	11.713% (1st)
4	November 25, 2022	11.800% (1st)	13.153% (1st)
5	November 26, 2022	14.758% (1st)	16.195% (1st)
6	November 27, 2022	14.880% (1st)	16.507% (1st)
7	December 3, 2022	16.102% (1st)	18.026% (1st)
8	December 4, 2022	19.449% (1st)	21.776% (1st)
9	December 9, 2022	16.995% (1st)	19.512% (1st)
10	December 10, 2022	18.337% (1st)	20.515% (1st)
11	December 11, 2022	21.137% (1st)	23.858% (1st)
12	December 16, 2022	19.817% (1st)	22.178% (1st)
13	December 17, 2022	22.456% (1st)	24.370% (1st)
14	December 18, 2022	24.936% (1st)	26.949% (1st)
15	December 24, 2022	25.032% (1st)	28.164% (1st)
16	December 25, 2022	26.948% (1st)	30.101% (1st)
Average		17.399%	19.348%
In the table above, the blue numbers represent the lowest ratings and the red numbers represent the highest ratings.; This drama aired on a cable channel/pay TV which normally has a relatively smaller audience compared to free-to-air TV/public broadcasters (KBS, SBS, MBC, and EBS).

=== Accolades ===
Name of the award ceremony, year presented, category, nominee of the award, and the result of the nomination
Award ceremony	Year	Category	Nominee	Result	Ref.
APAN Star Awards	2023	Drama of the Year	Reborn Rich	Nominated	
APAN Star Awards	2023	Best Director	Jung Dae-yoon	Nominated	
APAN Star Awards	2023	Top Excellence Award, Actor in a Miniseries	Lee Sung-min	Nominated	
APAN Star Awards	2023	Top Excellence Award, Actor in a Miniseries	Song Joong-ki	Nominated	
APAN Star Awards	2023	Excellence Award, Actor in a Miniseries	Jo Han-chul	Won	
APAN Star Awards	2023	Excellence Acting Award, Actor	Jung Hee-tae	Nominated	
APAN Star Awards	2023	Excellence Acting Award, Actress	Park Ji-hyun	Nominated	
Baeksang Arts Awards	2023	Grand Prize – Television	Lee Sung-min	Nominated	
Baeksang Arts Awards	2023	Best Actor	Lee Sung-min	Won	
Baeksang Arts Awards	2023	Best Supporting Actor	Kim Do-hyun	Nominated	
Baeksang Arts Awards	2023	Best Supporting Actress	Kim Shin-rok	Nominated	
International Emmy Awards	2023	Best TV Movie/Mini-Series	Reborn Rich	Nominated	
Korea Drama Awards	2023	KDF Award	Jung Hee-tae	Won	
Korea Communications Commission Broadcasting Awards	2023	Top Excellence Award	Reborn Rich	Won	
Korea PD Awards	2023	Best Picture TV	Reborn Rich	Won	
Seoul International Drama Awards	2023	Best Miniseries	Reborn Rich	Won	
Seoul International Drama Awards	2023	Outstanding Korean Actor	Lee Sung-min	Won	

== Remake ==
The over-the-top (OTT) streaming service, Viu, who bought the rights to air the show under the Viu Original label in all markets outside South Korea, unveiled that they will remake the series in Thai. The series is to be released in 2024.
