= Song Joong-ki =

South Korean actor (born 1985)

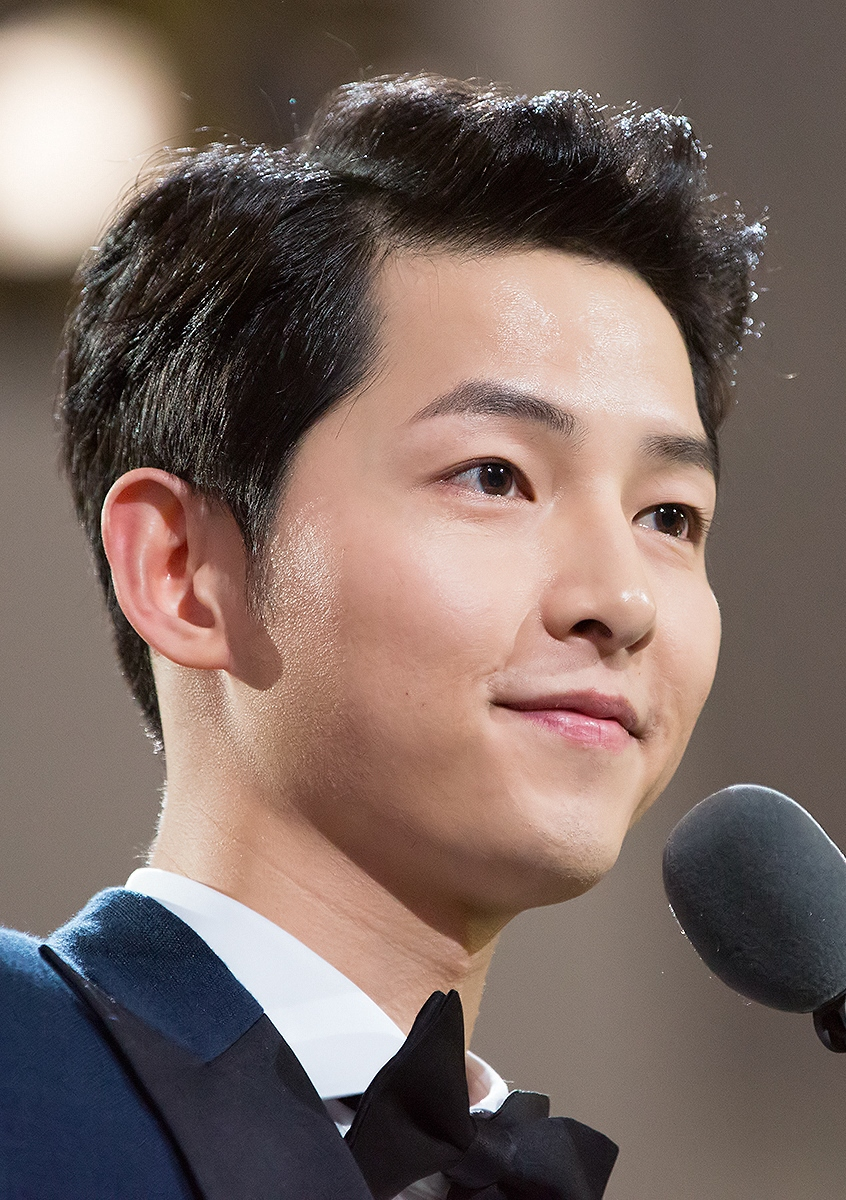
- Song in 2016
- Born: September 19, 1985 (age 41); Daejeon, South Korea
- Education: Sungkyunkwan University (BBA)
- Occupation: Actor
- Years active: 2008–present
- Agent: HighZium Studio (Note: Formerly History D&C. Currently operating as a subsidiary of SLL.)
- Works: Full list
- Spouses: Song Hye-kyo (m. 2017; div. 2019) Katy Louise Saunders (m. 2023)
- Children: 2

Korean name
- Hangul: 송중기
- RR: Song Junggi
- MR: Song Chunggi

Song Joong-ki (Korean: 송중기; born September 19, 1985) is a South Korean actor who primarily works in television. He rose to fame in the historical coming-of-age drama Sungkyunkwan Scandal (2010) and the variety show Running Man (2010–2011). Since then, he has played diverse roles in the television series The Innocent Man (2012), Descendants of the Sun (2016), Vincenzo (2021), and Reborn Rich (2022); as well as the films A Werewolf Boy (2012), The Battleship Island (2017), and Space Sweepers (2021).

Success of his television dramas have established him as one of the top hallyu stars. His accolades include two Baeksang Arts Awards, one Buil Film Award and two Blue Dragon Film Awards. Since 2012, he has appeared in Forbes Korea Power Celebrity 40 six times, being in the top ten four times. He was named Gallup Korea's Television Actor of the Year in 2012 and 2017.

== Early life and education ==
Song was born in Dong District, Daejeon, South Korea as the middle child of three siblings. He was raised in a rural outskirts of the city. He competed in short track speed skating and represented his home city at a national level; his skating background would prove useful for his role as a national team skater in the TV series Triple. An injury forced him to give up the sport during his first year of high school. He excelled in his studies all through high school and scored 380 points out of 400 on his national college entrance test, gaining admission to Sungkyunkwan University. While in Seoul preparing for the entrance test, he was scouted on the subway by an agent but did not immediately enter the entertainment industry as he was still ambivalent about his career path, and because his father had initially been against him becoming an actor. He continued to study part-time after deciding to enter the entertainment industry full-time during his third year of university, eventually graduating with a degree in Business Administration (minor in broadcasting) in 2012.

Song first appeared in a TV show as a contestant on KBS's Quiz Korea, substituting for a senior who was sick. Song eventually won second place. This brought him significant attention, and he became a cover model for the university magazine College.

== Career ==
=== 2008–2011: Beginnings and breakthrough ===
Song made his acting debut in the 2008 period film A Frozen Flower. The following year, he appeared in the couple-swapping segment "Believe in the Moment" of omnibus Five Senses of Eros and continued to take on small but notable roles in Triple and Will It Snow for Christmas?. Song also became a regular host of KBS Friday music program Music Bank from 2009 to 2010. He then appeared in the 2010 medical drama OB & GY, and animal movie sequel Hearty Paws 2.

Song's breakthrough came in the fusion historical drama Sungkyunkwan Scandal where he played the role of an 18th-century Joseon-era rich, indolent playboy. Despite stable but unspectacular ratings, the drama became a cult hit and his on-screen "bromance" with actor Yoo Ah-in was popular with viewers. Song also joined the cast of variety program Running Man from 2010 to 2011.

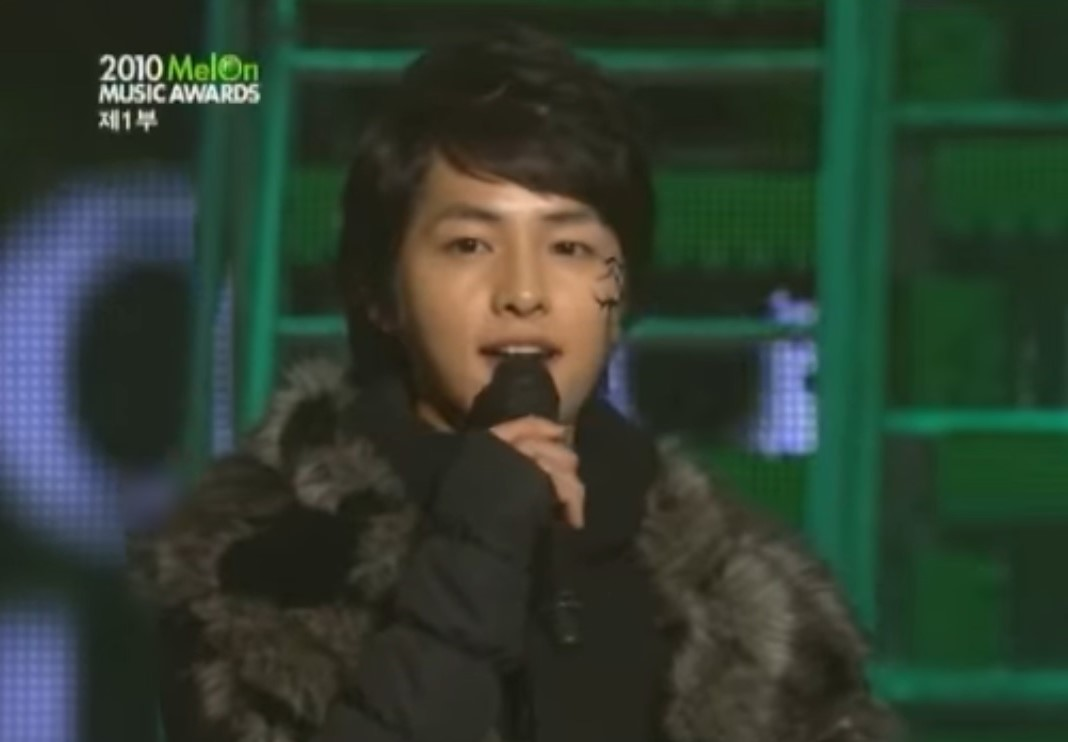
Song as the host of the 2010 Melon Music Awards

Song later released the book Beautiful Skin Project, a bestselling health and beauty guide for men (which was re-released in Japan in 2013). In late 2010, he went on a bicycling tour around Sydney, which aired two episodes on TV via ELLE, an offshoot of the eponymous fashion magazine. Moreover, a TV special of the actor's trip to Japan entitled I'm Real: Song Joong-ki aired two parts in early 2011. Song later became an MC for jTBC audition program Made in U.

In 2011, Song starred as a jobless deadbeat in the romantic comedy Penny Pinchers. His acting performance was praised by critics, declaring him a "charismatic, swoon-worthy leading man with a viable presence." Song took on the role of the young king Sejong in Deep Rooted Tree (2011). Critics praised Song's performance, calling it a portrayal of a genius who "realizes the futility of power early in life" and hides in his books to cope with growing up under the rule of his tyrannical father Taejong. Song received the PD Award at the 2011 SBS Drama Awards for the role.

He later narrated the six-part documentary Tears of the Antarctic for MBC program Tears of the Earth (2012), which focuses on pressing environmental issues on the planet and donated his entire salary to charity. He reprised his role as the narrator when the series was re-edited and released in theaters as Pengi and Sommi (2012). The Korea Times highlighted his talking baritone when addressing his narration role.

=== 2012–2015: Leading roles and military enlistment ===
Song described 2012 as a "phenomenal year" for his career. He played the titular character in fantasy romance film A Werewolf Boy, which premiered at the 2012 Toronto International Film Festival. In preparation for his role, Song watched nature documentaries and observed stray dogs on the streets to learn how to mime and imitate the body movements of an animal. He also repeatedly watched Tim Burton's 1990 romantic fantasy Edward Scissorhands, Matt Reeves' 2010 vampire flick Let Me In, and Gollum in The Lord of the Rings. The film was screened at the Busan International Film Festival, and became the most successful Korean melodrama of all time, with more than 7 million tickets sold.

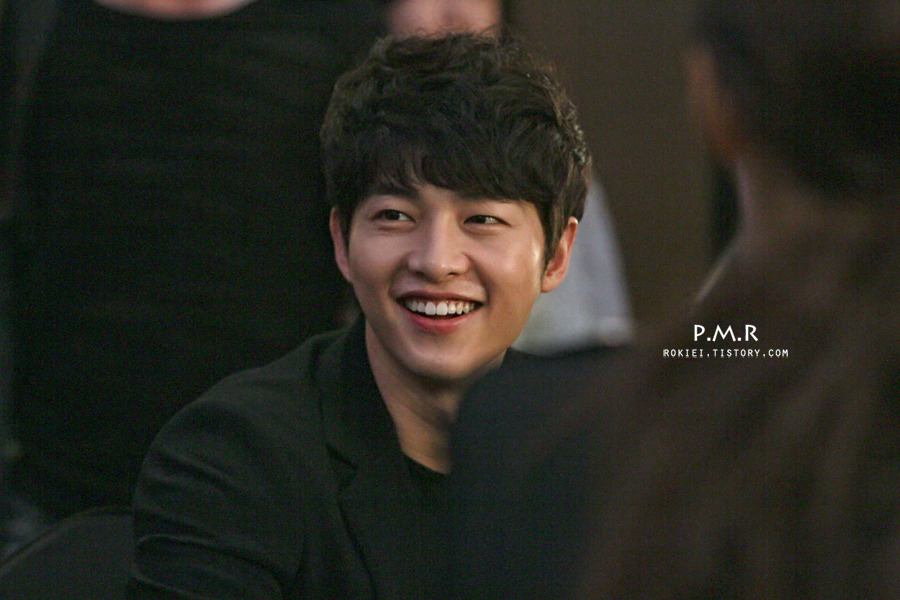
Song at The Innocent Man press conference in September 2012

The same year, he took on his first leading drama role in television, The Innocent Man. His assured and nuanced portrayal of an antihero received praise from critics and audience. The drama attracted high ratings, which along with the impressive box office run of A Werewolf Boy, cemented Song's image in the press as the "savior" of the melodrama genre both on the big and small screen. Song won Top Excellence Award (Actor) at the 20th Korean Culture and Entertainment Awards, 1st K-Drama Star Awards and the 2012 KBS Drama Awards.

In February 2013, after his contract with entertainment agency Sidus HQ expired, Song announced that he would be joining Blossom Entertainment. He then enlisted on August 27 at the 102nd draft camp in Chuncheon. He served in an infantry unit assigned to patrol and conduct reconnaissance missions along the DMZ and was discharged on May 26, 2015.

=== 2016–present: International popularity ===
Song made his small screen comeback in Descendants of the Sun alongside actress Song Hye-kyo, playing a military officer. The drama was incredibly popular in Korea with a peak viewership rating of 41.6% and in Asia, where it was viewed 2.5 billion times on iQiyi. The drama reestablished Song as a leader of the hallyu, and he topped popularity polls in Asia.

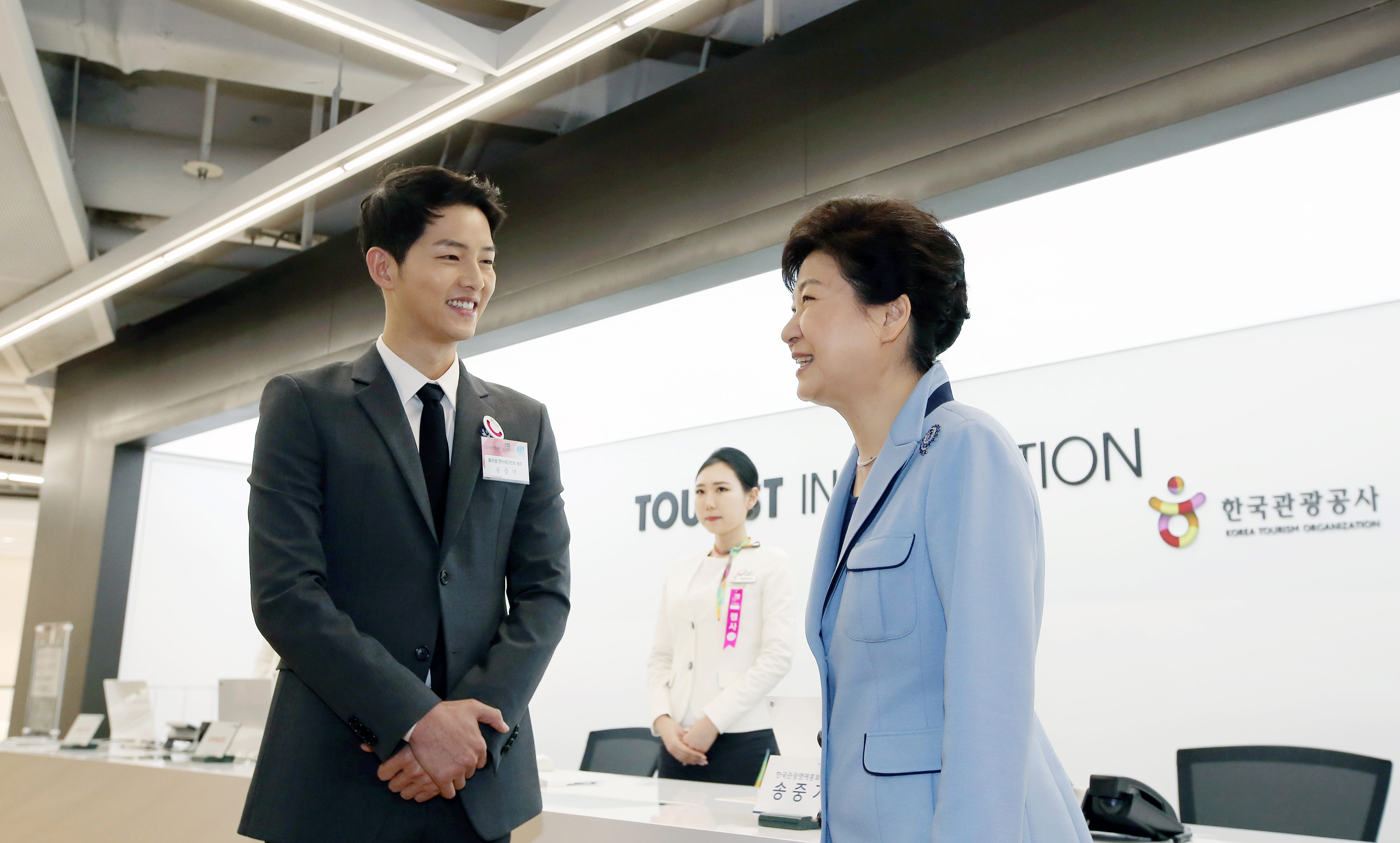
Song with Park Geun-hye, former President of South Korea in 2016

Song was made the Korean Tourism Honorary Ambassador by the Korea Tourism Organization to actively promote Korean tourism worldwide. He was the first actor to be invited to the nationwide live prime-time news show KBS News 9. He was also listed as one of the Top 100 Future Generation of Leaders, at #34. He became the face of over 30 brands in 2016 alone and was one of the recipients of Korea's "Brand of the Year" award. Song won the Daesang (or "Grand Prize"), the highest award for television, at the 30th KBS Drama Awards and the 5th APAN Star Awards as well as the Best Actor (TV) award at the 11th Seoul International Drama Awards and the 29th Korean Producer Awards for his acting performance.

Song was then cast in the period action film The Battleship Island (2017). He stars alongside actors So Ji-sub and Hwang Jung-min and portrays a member of the Korean independence movement, who sneaks onto Hashima Island to rescue a fellow member. Song made his small screen comeback in the historical fantasy drama Arthdal Chronicles, which premiered on tvN in 2019. The drama was a reunion project with his Descendants of the Sun co-star Kim Ji won. In January 2020, Song left Blossom Entertainment and signed with History D&C, a newly launched talent management and content production company founded by former SidusHQ executive Hwang Ki-yong.

In 2021, Song starred in the science fiction film Space Sweepers alongside Kim Tae-ri, directed by Jo Sung-hee, released exclusively on Netflix on February 5, 2021. The movie debuted at No. 1 on Netflix, dominated daily top 10 rankings in 80 countries and gathered more than 26 millions household viewers during the first 28 days of its release. He also starred as the titular character in the series Vincenzo alongside Jeon Yeo-been, which was released on February 20, 2021, on Netflix and tvN. It became the 6th highest-rated drama in tvN history after its finale, and is currently the 9th highest-rated drama in Korean cable television history. The series was also vastly popular on Netflix, ranking 4th on Forbes most-viewed Korean series on Netflix in 2021.

Song was then cast in the fantasy revenge series Reborn Rich directed by Jeong Dae-Yoon, adapted from the popular web novel of the same name. It premiered on JTBC in November 2022, and Song played the role of an employee who was killed by a conglomerate family and reincarnated as the youngest member of the same family. The series became the highest rated series aired in 2022 and the second highest-rated drama in Korean cable television history in both viewership ratings and number of viewers, with its final episode recording 26.9% nationwide ratings.

In 2023, Song played the character of Chi-Gun, a middle boss of a local gang, in the neo-noir thriller Hopeless, for which he won the best supporting actor at the Buil Film Awards. It premiered in the Un Certain Regard section at the 2023 Cannes Film Festival. In 2024, Song played the titular character Loh Kiwan, a North Korean defector in the drama film My Name Is Loh Kiwan alongside Choi Sung-eun, written and directed by Kim Hee-jin, released exclusively on Netflix on March 1, 2024. He starred in the criminal thriller film Bogota: City of the Lost alongside Lee Hee-joon and Kwon Hae-hyo, which was directed by Kim Seong-je.

== Public image ==
Song has primarily been known for his "flower boy" or "pretty boy" image, with his theme song being "Pretty Boy" by M2M. He majored in business administration at Korea's Sungkyunkwan University and worked as an active anchor of the campus broadcaster. He was called the school's ulzzang (best face) and umchina or "mom's friend's son" (perfect son). Dr. Jun Sung, author of Korean Masculinities and Transcultural Consumption, cited Song as the embodiment of "soft masculinity."

In 2011, after effectively playing the younger version of King Sejong in Deep Rooted Tree that made him trend in web portals, he earned the title "good actor Song Joong-ki." Song has been hailed as "the savior of melodrama" in his home country and called "Korea's DiCaprio" after the hit drama The Innocent Man and most watched melodrama movie A Werewolf Boy in 2012. In 2016, after portraying Army Captain Yoo Shi-jin in Descendants of the Sun, he was made the Korea Tourism Organization's Honorary Ambassador, topped popularity polls in Asia, and became a CF King. In China, the public safety Weibo page and the Chinese government has had to issue statements cautioning against overindulgence of the actor and the drama, citing cases of plastic surgery, domestic violence and divorce as a direct result. However, Song insisted that he never wanted a meteoric rise in popularity, saying "It's inevitable that popularity fades. That's why I must always be prepared."

Former journalist Kim Young-ho said that he is more than just a hallyu star and called him "a man of character." He also stated that "He is humble, well-mannered and very polite. Even after he rose to stardom, there was no change in his demeanor and he's still humble." Actor So Ji-sub described him as "a manly man without any pretense." Other personalities in South Korea that have been vocal of his good manners include Gummy, DinDin, Park Hoon, Kim Jong-kook, Onew, Moon Chae-won, Park Bo-young, Jo In-sung, and Lee Kwang-soo. He is also known for his regular donations to several causes and participation in philanthropic acts.

Song considers his "responsibility" to be aware of his influence on fans that expanded overseas, saying that "I could have never made it to such a position without the help of many others. I think the effort and hard work of my predecessors, staff members, and fans have contributed to such a result. Thus, I do have a sense of responsibility. I want to live up to my reputation as a Korean citizen, actor, and person. I will try my best to be modest but confident at all times." In 2017, when asked about starring in The Battleship Island that shows the sensitive subject of Korean-Japanese history, he expressed that it was a small expression of his beliefs.

After years of aversion to social media, Song opened his official Instagram account under the username "hi_songjoongki" on February 14, 2021, directly managed by his agency History D&C. When interviewed for KBS News 9 in 2016, Song revealed that it was challenging for him to keep up with the latest technology, including social media. His fancafe, established in early 2006, became his way to communicate with his official fandom named "Ki Aile", which means "Ki's wings". Song said the fans were like his wings for they lift him up, emotionally and financially, by voting for him and buying the products he endorses as well as watch all his movies and TV shows.

== Other ventures ==
=== Ambassadorship ===
In 2010, Song and Park Shin-hye were chosen as PR ambassadors for the 17th Jeonju International Film Festival (JIFF). In 2011, Song was chosen as the ambassador for the Good-hearted Library Project, a talent donation campaign by the Standard Chartered that allows the public to participate in the production of audiobooks for the visually impaired. In 2013, Song and Ha Ji-won were appointed as honorary ambassadors of medical tourism by South Korea's Ministry of Health and Welfare. They appeared in regional cities on behalf of Medical Korea as they promote greater international co-operation for medical technology and positive medical tourism. In 2016, Song was chosen as the honorary ambassador and promotional model for Korean tourism under South Korea's Ministry of Culture, Sports and Tourism. From 2017 to 2021, Song is titled the honorary ambassador for Incheon International Airport.

=== Philanthropy ===
Song has been a celebrity advocate for cancer-stricken children since 2011. This was later known in early March 2016 through the announcement made by the Korea Childhood Leukemia Foundation (KCLF) on their official blog. For the past 5 years, more than 10 children have received treatment secretly donated by him. According to KCLF, he has participated in the "Yellow Ribbon Campaign" to raise awareness about childhood cancers. Furthermore, he has given rice wreaths from press conferences and his pay generated from narrating the documentary Tears of the Antarctic. This has inspired his official fan club Ki Aile to celebrate his birthdays by donating transplant fees to help patients with leukemia and cancer. Song has since made donations to KCLF every year. Song also took part in lending his voice for the visually impaired.

In 2015, during his military service, he donated 100 million won to the UNICEF Korea Committee to help the children and victims of the April 2015 Nepal earthquake. In 2016, Song donated all of his proceeds from being featured on the May 13 episode of Hurry Up, Brother, a Chinese version of Running Man, to a Chinese charity organization. Song has also donated a portion of his profits from the 2016 Asian Fan Meeting Tour to a foundation that helps those affected by 2008 Sichuan earthquake. In addition, his revenues from Seoul and Thailand fan meetings were all donated to an unnamed charity. Subsequently, Song donated 20 million won to the House of Sharing in Gwangju, Gyeonggi, a shelter for elderly women who were forced into being comfort women by the Imperial Japanese Army during World War II. The actor was likely influenced while filming his movie The Battleship Island, a period action film about Korean workers under Japanese rule. Later in July 2017, his fans donated to the same center. In 2019, Song has donated 30 million won for the victims of wildfire in Gangwon Province. From 2020 to 2021, Song made donations for coronavirus prevention. On August 2, 2021, Song participated in the promotion of the annual dance festival Korea International Accessible Dance Festival (KIADA) for persons with disabilities while being quarantined. On October 26, 2021, Song received the Presidential Commendation Award for his generous contributions over the years.

=== Endorsements ===
Song had endorsed deals in nearly every industry such as healthcare, cosmetic, clothing, food, travel and tourism, telecom, electronics and retail. He first appeared in a television commercial of Dunkin' Donuts in May 2008. After starring in drama Sungkyunkwan Scandal in 2010, Song became the face of fashion brands EZIO and TBJ, casual clothing brand AD HOC with Min Hyo-rin, sports brand Le Coq Sportif with IU, as well as foods Pizza Etang, a popular pizza in South Korea and Ottogi Snack Ramen. In the digital and technology sector, Song was chosen for the brand Xbox 360 Kinect because of his "childlike, innocent, and healthy" image that matches the new hands-free game controller and LG XNote with Shin Min-a in 2011. Song was also appointed as the official ambassador of the skincare Tony Moly and Fujifilm polaroid for two consecutive years. Subsequently, he appeared in restaurant brand Sonsoo's advertisement as a prodigy cook alongside Song Seung-heon and Yoon Sang-hyun. Song was also chosen as the new model of the dairy brand Seoul Milk.

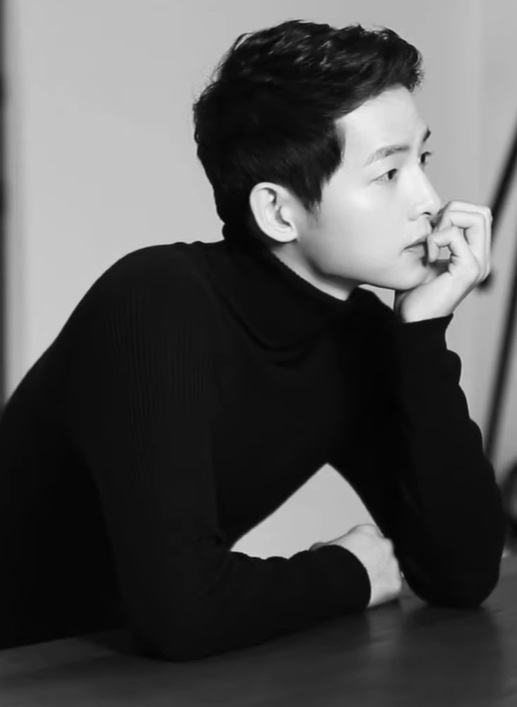
Song as the endorser of Forencos in 2016

Soon after starring in drama The Innocent Man and film A Werewolf Boy in 2012, Blossom Entertainment reported that Song was on his way to become the next CF King with 10 endorsement deals under his belt. For two years in a row, he was the main model for the global soda brand Sprite. From 2013 to 2016, he was the endorser of the water purifier brand Ruhens. In February 2019, Ruhens selected Song as their endorser again.

Following the release of the pan-Asian hit drama Descendants of the Sun in 2016, Song became the modelling face of more than 30 international and local products. The Korea Broadcast Advertising Promotion Corporation (KOBACO) "2016 Consumer Behavior Survey" picked Song as the best model to represent South Korean brands. Some of his ad include Baskin Robbins, LG Household & Health Care, KT, Forencos, Jeju Air, Hite Jinro, Cuchen, as well as lucrative Chinese products like Proya with Zhang Ziyi, Tencent, and Vivo. Song also worked with Park Bo-gum as brand models for Domino's Pizza and Line Pay Card. In February 2017, Song was announced as the brand ambassador of the online market place "11Street" of SK Planet in Thailand. He was paired with Thai actress Mew Nittha on TV, digital, and outdoor ads on the busiest Bangkok Mass Transit System stations in Chit Lom, Siam and Phrom Pong. Cheil Thailand reported that it was a successful campaign as its Facebook page exceeded 1 million views upon its launching. In April 2018, Song was revealed as the new endorser of Hyundai LIVART, a Korea-based lifestyle culture company. They chose Song as its advertising model only 14 years after actress Kim Nam-joo in 2004.

== Personal life ==
On July 5, 2017, Song and Descendants of the Sun co-star Song Hye-kyo announced through their respective agencies that they were engaged. They married in a private ceremony on October 31, 2017, at Youngbingwan, Hotel Shilla in Seoul, amid intense media interest across Asia with his closest family and friends. On June 26, 2019, the couple announced their divorce, which was finalized in July 2019.

On December 26, 2022, it was confirmed that Song was dating a British girlfriend, though nothing more was stated about her identity. On January 30, 2023, Song announced through his fancafe that he had married his British-Italian girlfriend Katy Louise Saunders, a former actress who was already pregnant with their first child. On June 14, 2023, Saunders gave birth to a son at a hospital in Rome. On July 8, 2024, it was reported that the couple is expecting their second child. On November 20, 2024, Song announced the birth of their daughter. Song lives in Seoul and Tuscany, Italy with his wife and children.

== Discography ==
=== Soundtrack appearances ===
List of soundtrack appearances, with year, and album
Title	Year	Album	Ref.
"Enjoy A Rummy" (맛있게도 냠냠)	2011	Penny Pinchers OST	
"The Water is Wide" (바다가 넓어 건널) (with Gyepi)	2011	Penny Pinchers OST	
"Really" (정말)	2012	The Innocent Man OST	

== Bibliography ==
Year	Title	Hangul	Author	Publisher	Ref.
2010	Beautiful Skin Project	피부미남 프로젝트	Song Joong-ki, Hwang Min-young	Antenna Books	

== Accolades ==
=== Awards and nominations ===
Name of award ceremony, year presented, award category, nominee of award, and result of nomination
Award ceremony	Year	Category	Nominee(s) / Work(s)	Result	Ref.
APAN Star Awards	2012	Top Excellence Award, Actor	The Innocent Man	Won	
APAN Star Awards	2016	Best APAN Star Award	Descendants of the Sun	Won	
APAN Star Awards	2016	Best Couple Award with Song Hye-kyo	Descendants of the Sun	Won	
APAN Star Awards	2016	Grand Prize (Daesang)	Descendants of the Sun	Won	
APAN Star Awards	2016	Top Excellence Award, Actor in a Miniseries	Descendants of the Sun	Nominated	
APAN Star Awards	2022	Grand Prize (Daesang)	Vincenzo	Won	
APAN Star Awards	2022	Best Couple with Jeon Yeo-been	Vincenzo	Nominated	
APAN Star Awards	2022	Popularity Star Award, Actor	Vincenzo	Nominated	
APAN Star Awards	2022	Top Excellence Award, Actor in a Miniseries	Vincenzo	Nominated	
APAN Star Awards	2023	Top Excellence Award, Actor in a Miniseries	Reborn Rich	Nominated	
Asia Artist Awards	2016	Grand Prize (Daesang)	Descendants of the Sun	Nominated	
Asia Contents Awards	2021	Best Actor (TV)	Vincenzo	Nominated	
Asia Model Awards	2011	BBF Fashionista Award	Song Joong-ki	Won	
Baeksang Arts Awards	2013	Best Actor – Film	A Werewolf Boy	Nominated	
Baeksang Arts Awards	2016	iQiyi Global Star Award	Descendants of the Sun	Won	
Baeksang Arts Awards	2016	Most Popular Actor (TV)	Descendants of the Sun	Won	
Baeksang Arts Awards	2016	Best Actor – Television	Descendants of the Sun	Nominated	
Baeksang Arts Awards	2021	Best Actor – Television	Vincenzo	Nominated	
Baeksang Arts Awards	2024	Best Supporting Actor – Film	Hopeless	Nominated	
Blue Dragon Film Awards	2010	Best New Actor	Hearty Paws 2	Nominated	
Blue Dragon Film Awards	2021	Popular Star Award	Space Sweepers	Won	
Blue Dragon Film Awards	2021	Best Actor	Space Sweepers	Nominated	
Blue Dragon Film Awards	2023	Popular Star Award	Hopeless	Won	
Blue Dragon Film Awards	2023	Best Supporting Actor	Hopeless	Nominated	
Brand Customer Loyalty Award	2021	Best Actor – Film	Song Joong-ki	Won	
Brand of the Year Awards	2016	Actor of the Year	Song Joong-ki	Won	
Brand of the Year Awards	2021	Actor of the Year	Song Joong-ki	Won	
Buil Film Awards	2024	Best Supporting Actor	Hopeless	Won	
Chunsa Film Art Awards	2021	Best Actor	Space Sweepers	Won	
KBS Drama Awards	2010	Best Couple Award with Yoo Ah-in	Sungkyunkwan Scandal	Won	
KBS Drama Awards	2010	Popularity Award	Sungkyunkwan Scandal	Won	
KBS Drama Awards	2010	Excellence Award, Actor in a Mid-length Drama	Sungkyunkwan Scandal	Nominated	
KBS Drama Awards	2012	Best Couple Award with Moon Chae-won	The Innocent Man	Won	
KBS Drama Awards	2012	Netizens' Award	The Innocent Man	Won	
KBS Drama Awards	2012	Top Excellence Award, Actor	The Innocent Man	Won	
KBS Drama Awards	2012	Excellence Award, Actor in a Mid-length Drama	The Innocent Man	Nominated	
KBS Drama Awards	2016	Asia Best Couple with Song Hye-kyo	Descendants of the Sun	Won	
KBS Drama Awards	2016	Best Couple with Song Hye-kyo	Descendants of the Sun	Won	
KBS Drama Awards	2016	Grand Prize (Daesang)	Descendants of the Sun	Won	
KBS Drama Awards	2016	Excellence Award, Actor in a miniseries	Descendants of the Sun	Nominated	
KBS Drama Awards	2016	Top Excellence Award, Actor	Descendants of the Sun	Nominated	
Kinolights Awards	2021	Actor of the Year (Domestic)	Vincenzo & Space Sweepers	2nd	
Korea Culture & Entertainment Awards	2012	Top Excellence Award, Actor	The Innocent Man	Won	
Korea Drama Awards	2011	Best New Actor	Sungkyunkwan Scandal	Nominated	
Korea Drama Awards	2016	Grand Prize (Daesang)	Descendants of the Sun	Nominated	
Korea Youth Hope Awards	2022	Korea Youth Hope Award (Broadcasting)	Song Joong-ki	Won	
Korean Producer Awards	2017	Best Performer Award	Descendants of the Sun	Won	
Nickelodeon Kids' Choice Awards	2013	Favorite Actor	A Werewolf Boy	Won	
SBS Drama Awards	2011	Producer's Award	Deep Rooted Tree	Won	
SBS Entertainment Awards	2010	Best Newcomer in a Variety Show	Running Man	Won	
Seoul International Drama Awards	2016	Outstanding Korean Actor	Descendants of the Sun	Won	
Seoul International Drama Awards	2021	Outstanding Korean Actor	Vincenzo	Won	
Style Icon Asia	2010	New Style Icon (TV Actor)	Song Joong-ki	Won	
Style Icon Asia	2012	Style Icon	Song Joong-ki	Won	
Style Icon Asia	2016	Style Icon	Song Joong-ki	Won	

=== State honors ===
Name of the organization, year presented, and the award given
Country	Organization	Year	Award	Ref.
South Korea	Financial Services Commission (Note: Honors are given at the Financial Day ceremony.)	2021	Presidential Commendation	
South Korea	Korean Popular Culture and Arts Awards (Note: Honors are given at the Korean Popular Culture and Arts Awards, arranged by the Korea Creative Content Agency and hosted by the Ministry of Culture, Sports and Tourism. They are awarded to those who have contributed to the arts and South Korea's pop culture.)	2016	Presidential Commendation	

=== Listicles ===
Name of publisher, year listed, name of listicle, and placement
Publisher	Year	Listicle	Rank	Ref.
Forbes	2012	Korea Power Celebrity	27th	
Forbes	2013	Korea Power Celebrity	7th	
Forbes	2014	Korea Power Celebrity	27th	
Forbes	2017	Korea Power Celebrity	2nd	
Forbes	2018	Korea Power Celebrity	7th	
Forbes	2023	Korea Power Celebrity	4th	
Gallup Korea	2012	Television Actor of the Year	1st	
Gallup Korea	2016	Television Actor of the Year	2nd	
Gallup Korea	2017	Television Actor of the Year	1st	
Gallup Korea	2021	Television Actor of the Year	10th	
Gallup Korea	2022	Television Actor of the Year	5th	
Gallup Korea	2023	Television Actor of the Year	5th	
Gallup Korea	2012	Gallup Korea's Film Actor of the Year	2nd	
Gallup Korea	2017	Gallup Korea's Film Actor of the Year	8th	
Sisa Journal (Note: The Sisa Journal is one of the major weekly news magazines in Korea. Established in 1989, its annually conducted 'Who Moves Korea' survey determines the most influential figures in the country and highlights next-generation leaders of Korea. The survey is conducted on a total of 1000 experts across 10 fields, including professors, journalists, politicians, businessmen, and cultural artists.)	2016	Most Influential People in Broadcasting and Entertainment	2nd	
Sisa Journal	2016	100 Next Generation Leaders	34th	
