= Jo Sung-hee =

South Korean film director (born 1979)

- Born: February 3, 1979 (age 47); Gyeonggi Province, South Korea
- Education: Seoul National University - Industrial Design; Korean Academy of Film Arts - Filmmaking
- Occupations: Film director, screenwriter, animator

Korean name
- Hangul: 조성희
- RR: Jo Seonghui
- MR: Cho Sŏnghŭi

Jo Sung-hee (born February 3, 1979) is a South Korean film director. He directed the box office hit A Werewolf Boy (2012).

== Career ==
After majoring in industrial design at Seoul National University, Jo Sung-hee joined the Seo Taiji Company and Olive Studio, a children's animation company. During his time at these companies, he worked on numerous music videos and animated films as an assistant director. He also directed the 52-episode animated television series Barnacle Lou (따개비 루), which aired on EBS in 2007.

Jo then studied film directing at the prestigious Korean Academy of Film Arts (KAFA). He got admitted by submitting a film he made with his friends for pure fun. Among his classmates at KAFA was Yoon Sung-hyun, who would go on to direct Bleak Night. One of Jo's teachers was Oh Seung-uk, screenwriter of award-winning romance Christmas in August, who taught him that "a director should trust his own abilities, but should always challenge their own works and expand their experiences."

In 2008 he wrote and directed the 43-minute short film Don't Step Out of the House (남매의 집), in which two impoverished children are menaced by strangers in the basement of a house. The short won several awards in 2009, including Best Picture at the Mise-en-scène Short Film Festival and the Seoul Independent Film Festival, the Eastar Jet Award (Best Korean Short Film) at the Jeonju International Film Festival, and Third Prize at the Cinéfondation section of the Cannes Film Festival. It was later included in the omnibus Nice Shorts (released in 2009).

As his graduation film for KAFA, Jo made his feature debut in 2010 with End of Animal (짐승의 끝), starring Lee Min-ji and Park Hae-il. Part apocalypse, part horror, part mystery movie, the plot follows a young woman in the last month of her pregnancy who runs into a series of ordeals and uncanny misfortunes while trying to get to her hometown to give birth. The film drew acclaim from local critics and in the international film festival circuit.

Jo surprised the film industry in 2012 with his second feature. Unlike his previous films which delved into the intricacies of the human psyche and had been called "dark, even grotesque," A Werewolf Boy (늑대소년) was a fantasy romance starring popular actors Song Joong-ki and Park Bo-young. Though admittedly commercial, Jo said he didn't compromise a lot in making the film and that he'd "always wanted to make a movie that can be widely watched and enjoyed by all generations." It also retained the whimsical sense of humor and creeping sense of doubt that characterized his previous works. The coming-of-age film takes place in a rural Korean town in the 1960s, where a teenage girl meets a feral boy who can neither read nor speak. She teaches him civilized human behavior using a dog-training manual, and the two fall in love, but the mystery of his origins and the townspeople's fear threaten their idyll. After its world premiere at the 2012 Toronto International Film Festival, domestically the film reached nearly 7 million admissions to become the third best-selling Korean film of 2012 and currently the most successful Korean melodrama of all time. Jo received the 2013 Discovery Award from the Korea Film Reporters Association, and Best New Director from the 2013 Baeksang Arts Awards.

In 2021, he was selected as jury member for Bucheon Choice Features section of 25th Bucheon International Fantastic Film Festival held in July.

== Filmography ==
- Space Sweepers (2020) - director, screenplay
- Phantom Detective (2016) - director
- A Werewolf Boy (2012) - director, screenplay
- End of Animal (2011) - director, screenplay, editor
- Members of the Funeral (2009) - storyboard
- Don't Step Out of the House (short film, 2008) - director, screenplay, editor
- Barnacle Lou (TV, 2007) - director
- Tropicalia (short film, 2006) - director
- Where I Am (music video, 2004) - director
- le chat magique (animated short, 2003) - director

== Awards and nominations ==
Year	Award	Category	Work	Result	Ref.
2009	35th Seoul Independent Film Festival	Best Picture	Don't Step Out of the House	Won	
2009	8th Mise-en-scène Short Film Festival	Grand Prize	Don't Step Out of the House	Won	
2009	8th Mise-en-scène Short Film Festival	Absolute Nightmare Best Film Award	Don't Step Out of the House	Won	
2009	62nd Cannes Film Festival	Cine Foundation Section 3rd Prize	Don't Step Out of the House	Won	
2009	10th Jeonju International Film Festival	Film	Don't Step Out of the House	Won	
2013	4th KOFRA Film Awards (Korea Film Reporters Association)	Mont Blanc Discovery Award	A Werewolf Boy	Won	
2013	49th Baeksang Arts Awards	Best Film	A Werewolf Boy	Nominated	
2013	49th Baeksang Arts Awards	Best New Director	A Werewolf Boy	Won	
2013	49th Baeksang Arts Awards	Best Screenplay	A Werewolf Boy	Nominated	
2013	5th Terracotta Far East Film Festival	Current Asian Cinema Audience Award	A Werewolf Boy	Won	
2013	50th Grand Bell Awards	Best New Director	A Werewolf Boy	Nominated	
2013	34th Blue Dragon Film Awards	Best New Director	A Werewolf Boy	Nominated	
2021	26th Chunsa Film Art Awards	Best Director	Space Sweepers	Won	
