= The Innocent Man (South Korean TV series) =

South Korean television series

- Promotional poster
- Also known as: Nice Guy
- Hangul: 세상 어디에도 없는 착한 남자
- Lit.: The Nice Guy Never Seen Anywhere in the World
- RR: Sesang eodiedo eomneun chakhan namja
- MR: Sesang ŏdiedo ŏmnŭn ch'akhan namja
- Genre: Melodrama; Romance
- Created by: Jeong Seong-hyo
- Written by: Lee Kyung-hee
- Directed by: Kim Jin-won; Lee Na-jeong
- Starring: Song Joong-ki; Moon Chae-won; Park Si-yeon
- Ending theme: "Love Is Like a Snowflake" by Junsu
- Composers: Choi Seong-kwon; Choi In-hee
- Country of origin: South Korea
- Original languages: Korean; Japanese
- No. of episodes: 20

Production
- Executive producer: Beak Kyung Soo
- Producer: Ham Young-hoon
- Production locations: Seoul, South Korea; Hirosaki, Japan
- Cinematography: Baek Hong-jong; Lee Yoon-jeong
- Camera setup: Multiple-camera setup
- Running time: 60 minutes
- Production company: iHQ

Original release
- Network: KBS2
- Release: 12 September – 15 November 2012

The Innocent Man (Korean: 세상 어디에도 없는 착한 남자; RR: Sesang eodiedo eomneun chakhan namja) is a 2012 South Korean television series starring Song Joong-ki, Moon Chae-won, and Park Si-yeon. It aired on KBS2 from September 12 to November 15, 2012, every Wednesdays and Thursdays at 21:55 time slot for 20 episodes. It is known on Netflix as Nice Guy.

It is a dark melodrama involving betrayal and romance.

== Synopsis ==
Smart and promising medical student Kang Ma-ru (Song Joong-ki) is deeply in love with his slightly older neighbor Han Jae-hee (Park Si-yeon), a television reporter. But when her situation takes a turn for the worse and Jae-hee becomes desperate to escape poverty, she meets a man who changes everything—a rich CEO who introduces her to a life of comfort. So she turns her back on Ma-ru, choosing money over love.

The brutal betrayal leaves Ma-ru fractured—not just angry, but a completely changed man. A few years later, Ma-ru is now 30 years old and works as a bartender and gigolo, no longer a "nice guy." He then meets Seo Eun-gi (Moon Chae-won), a young chaebol heiress who's being groomed to take over her father's conglomerate. Eun-gi is cold and calculating, business-savvy, and raised by her father to never show emotion to anyone.

Ma-ru decides to take revenge on his ex Jae-hee and bring her down from her position after his sister, Kang Cho-co (Lee Yu-bi) is rushed to the hospital because of Jae-hee. Ma-ru, though initially had no plans as such, uses Eun-gi to take revenge on Jae-hee Just when Ma-ru is beginning to love Eun-gi, she finds out the real reason why he approached her and they break up. But a car accident causes Eun-gi to lose her memory, and she enters Ma-ru's life again.

== Cast ==
=== Main ===
- Song Joong-ki as Kang Ma-ru
  - Kang Chan-hee as young Ma-ru

A smart but poor medical student who has to look after his little sister without any parents. He was in love Jae-hee but she left him for a rich CEO as she always dreamt of being rich, but she always loved Ma-ru and still harbours feelings for him. Six years after Jae-hee left he became arrogant and a playboy who works as a bartender. He approached Eun-gi as part of his revenge plan against Jae-hee but he started to care for her and eventually fell in love.

- Moon Chae-won as Seo Eun-gi

A rich and arrogant girl but also has a kind-hearted side who does everything to protect her mother's memories who has a troubled relationship with her father and step-mother as she blames them for her mother leaving and her death. She falls for Ma-ru without knowing the real reason he approached her and she suffers a memory loss after landing in a car accident. After her memory loss, she is a much nicer person who searches for clues in order to get her memory returned.

- Park Si-yeon as Han Jae-hee
  - Park So-young as young Jae-hee

Although she is stone-hearted and loves Ma-ru, she loved money more than Ma-Ru and she left Ma-ru and became the mistress of a CEO and had his son. She and Eun-gi don't get along and she also doesn't care for her and tries to hurt her in many ways. She plans to take over Taesan Company after killing her husband.

=== Supporting ===
- Lee Kwang-soo as Park Jae-gil

Ma-ru's best friend and Choco's lover.

- Lee Yu-bi as Kang Choco
  - Han Seo-jin as young Kang Choco

Ma-ru's younger sister and Jae-gil's lover.

- Lee Sang-yeob as Park Joon-ha

Eun-gi's secretary and helper who loves and respects her.

- Kim Tae-hoon as Ahn Min-young

The secretary of the CEO who likes Jae-hee.

- Yang Ik-june as Han Jae-sik

Jae-hee's older brother who was abusive towards her.

- Kim Yeong-cheol as CEO Seo Jung-gyu

Eun-gi and Eun-seok's father, who found Jae-hee and took her as his mistress. Although good hearted, he sides with Jae-hee rather than his daughter as Eun-gi is stubborn and acts childish at times. He dies later in the season and gives his property and estate to Eun-gi but before she could be in charge, she lands in a car accident and suffers a memory loss.

- Jin Kyung as Hyun Jung-hwa

Eun-gi's assistant. After the car accident which caused Eun-gi's memory loss, she took her away and cared for her for a year where nobody could find her.

- Oh Yong as Jo Young-bae
- Jo Hwi-joon as Seo Eun-seok

Jae-hee and Jung-gyu's son, Eun-gi's 4 year old half-brother. He loves his step-sister despite her rudeness and hatred toward him but after her memory loss, she is unable to remember her hatred for him and instead grows closer to him.

- Kim Ye-won as Kim Yoo-ra
- Oh Hee-joon as Han Jae-shik
- Jo Sung-ha as Dr. Seok Min-hyuk (cameo, ep 1, 12, 20)
- Danny Ahn as Kim Jung-hoon (cameo, ep 2 & 15)

== Production ==
The series is written by Lee Kyung-hee, who previously wrote Will It Snow for Christmas?, Thank You, A Love to Kill, I'm Sorry, I Love You, and Sang Doo! Let's Go to School.

Kim Jin-won was the director of Drama Special episodes Just an Ordinary Love Story, Crossing the Young-do Bridge, Guardian Angel Kim Yeong-goo, Snail Gosiwon, and The Last Flashman.

The series features real-life friends and former Running Man co-stars Song Joong-ki and Lee Kwang-soo for the first time since Song left the variety show.

== Soundtrack ==
=== Part 1 ===
1. 사랑은 눈꽃처럼 (Love Is Like a Snowflake) - Junsu
2. 착한 여자 (Nice Girl) - Lee Soo-young
3. 좋은 사람입니다 (No One Is Better Than You) - Cho Eun
4. Lonely
5. Jae-hee and Ma-ru (with Empty Heart & Change)
6. Bueno Hombre
7. Waltz in Sorrow
8. Eun-gi and Ma-ru (with Late Autumn)
9. Melancholy
10. Blue Moon
11. Eun-gi (with Magnolia)
12. Late Autumn
13. Empty Heart
14. Broken Heart
15. Water Lily
16. Magnolia

=== Part 2 ===
1. 정말 (Really) - Song Joong-ki
2. 너만을 원했다 (I Only Wanted You) - Son Hoyoung (narration by Song Joong-ki)
3. 사랑해요 (I Love You) - Yoon Bitnara
4. Change
5. Here to Stay
6. 차칸남자 (Complicación)
7. Waltz in Sorrow (Guitar)
8. Beautiful Love
9. Nobody Sees Me
10. Despedida
11. Laberinto
12. Lonely Street
13. Collision De Frente
14. Before Winter Comes

== Ratings ==
Beginning episode 5, the series ranked number one in its timeslot for eight consecutive weeks until its finale.

Ep.	Original broadcast date	Average audience share			
Ep.	Original broadcast date	AGB Nielsen		TNmS	
Ep.	Original broadcast date	Nationwide	Seoul	Nationwide	Seoul
1	September 12, 2012	10.5%	11.5%	10.7%	10.9%
2	September 13, 2012	9.9%	11.3%	11.4%	11.6%
3	September 19, 2012	13.8%	14.5%	13.9%	14.6%
4	September 20, 2012	13.3%	14.2%	13.8%	15.4%
5	September 26, 2012	14.0%	15.7%	14.5%	14.8%
6	September 27, 2012	16.0%	18.1%	16.0%	17.8%
7	October 3, 2012	17.3%	18.6%	17.9%	18.6%
8	October 4, 2012	15.1%	16.6%	15.0%	14.4%
9	October 10, 2012	15.3%	17.3%	15.8%	17.3%
10	October 11, 2012	14.9%	15.7%	16.2%	17.3%
11	October 17, 2012	14.3%	15.3%	15.0%	16.5%
12	October 18, 2012	15.1%	15.7%	16.4%	17.0%
13	October 24, 2012	17.1%	18.8%	18.2%	18.7%
14	October 25, 2012	16.7%	18.4%	18.5%	19.6%
15	October 31, 2012	18.3%	20.6%	17.1%	17.6%
16	November 1, 2012	17.1%	18.8%	18.8%	19.8%
17	November 7, 2012	16.2%	16.4%	18.2%	19.6%
18	November 8, 2012	18.2%	19.7%	16.8%	18.1%
19	November 14, 2012	17.9%	19.3%	18.5%	19.9%
20	November 15, 2012	18.0%	19.4%	18.6%	20.2%
Average		15.3%	16.8%	16.1%	17.0%

== Awards and nominations ==
Year	Award	Category	Recipient	Result	Ref.
2012	20th Korean Culture and Entertainment Awards	Top Excellence Award, Actor	Song Joong-ki	Won	
2012	1st K-Drama Star Awards	Top Excellence Award, Actor	Song Joong-ki	Won	
2012	1st K-Drama Star Awards	Excellence Award, Actress	Moon Chae-won	Nominated	
2012	KBS Drama Awards	Best Couple Award	Song Joong-ki and Moon Chae-won	Won	
2012	KBS Drama Awards	Netizens' Award	Song Joong-ki	Won	
2012	KBS Drama Awards	Netizens' Award	Moon Chae-won	Won	
2012	KBS Drama Awards	Best New Actress	Lee Yu-bi	Nominated	
2012	KBS Drama Awards	Best Supporting Actor	Lee Kwang-soo	Nominated	
2012	KBS Drama Awards	Best Supporting Actor	Lee Sang-yeob	Nominated	
2012	KBS Drama Awards	Best Supporting Actress	Jin Kyung	Nominated	
2012	KBS Drama Awards	Excellence Award, Actor in a Mid-length Drama	Song Joong-ki	Nominated	
2012	KBS Drama Awards	Excellence Award, Actress in a Mid-length Drama	Moon Chae-won	Nominated	
2012	KBS Drama Awards	Excellence Award, Actress in a Mid-length Drama	Park Si-yeon	Nominated	
2012	KBS Drama Awards	Top Excellence Award, Actor	Song Joong-ki	Won	
2012	KBS Drama Awards	Top Excellence Award, Actress	Moon Chae-won	Won	
2013	49th Baeksang Arts Awards	Best New Actress (TV)	Lee Yu-bi	Nominated	
2013	7th Mnet 20's Choice Awards	20's Booming Star - Female	Lee Yu-bi	Nominated	
2013	8th Seoul International Drama Awards	Outstanding Korean Drama OST	"Love Is Like a Snowflake" - Junsu	Nominated	
2013	8th Seoul International Drama Awards	Outstanding Korean Drama OST	"Really" - Song Joong-ki	Nominated	
2013	8th Seoul International Drama Awards	Outstanding Korean Actor	Song Joong-ki	Nominated	
2013	8th Seoul International Drama Awards	Outstanding Korean Actress	Moon Chae-won	Nominated	
2013	8th Seoul International Drama Awards	Outstanding Korean Drama	The Innocent Man	Nominated	

== Remakes ==
- Günahkar (transl. "Sinner"), starring Seçkin Özdemir, Gülcan Arslan, Hazal Filiz Küçükköse, and Korel Cezayirli, is a Turkish remake that aired on Fox TV beginning November 5, 2014. However, it ended with its 7th episode due to low ratings, causing in an unfinished and unresolved ending.
