= A Werewolf Boy =

2012 South Korean fantasy romance film

- Theatrical release poster
- Hangul: 늑대소년
- Hanja: 늑대少年
- Lit.: Wolf Boy
- RR: Neukdae sonyeon
- MR: Nŭktae sonyŏn
- Directed by: Jo Sung-hee
- Written by: Jo Sung-hee
- Produced by: Kim Su-jin; Yu In-beom; Jeong Tae-seong
- Starring: Song Joong-ki; Park Bo-young
- Cinematography: Choi Sang-muk
- Edited by: Nam Na-yeong
- Music by: Shim Hyun-jung
- Production company: Bidangil Pictures
- Distributed by: CJ Entertainment
- Release dates: September 11, 2012 (TIFF); October 31, 2012 (South Korea)
- Running time: 122 minutes
- Country: South Korea
- Language: Korean
- Box office: US$46.3 million

A Werewolf Boy (Korean: 늑대소년) is a 2012 South Korean fantasy romance film in which a beautiful teenage girl (Park Bo-young) is sent to a country house for her health, where she befriends and attempts to civilize a feral boy (Song Joong-ki) she discovers on the grounds—but the beast inside him is constantly waiting to burst out.

Director Jo Sung-hee first wrote the script while studying at the Korean Academy of Film Arts and the script went through several rewrites before it was finalized in its current form. This is Jo's commercial debut; he previously directed the arthouse flick End of Animal and the short film Don't Step Out of the House.

A Werewolf Boy had its world premiere in the "Contemporary World Cinema" section of the 2012 Toronto International Film Festival, then screened at the 17th Busan International Film Festival before its theatrical release on October 31, 2012. It quickly rose up the box office charts to become the most successful Korean melodrama of all time.

== Plot ==
Kim Sun-yi, an elderly woman in her sixties living in the US, receives a phone call about the sale of her old family home back in South Korea.

Returning to her homeland, she's met by granddaughter Eun-joo, and they drive back to the house in the country. Sun-yi recalls how 47 years ago, when she was a 17-year-old girl in 1965, she moved from Seoul along with her widowed mother and sister Sun-ja to a remote valley to undergo a period of convalescence after suffering problems with her lungs.

The Kims lived in genteel poverty at the mercy of their landlord, Ji-tae, son of the business partner of Sun-yi's late father. Because of her delicate health, the introverted Sun-yi lives an isolated life.

One day, Sun-yi discovers a feral boy of about 19 in their yard. His blood type is unidentifiable, and he can neither read nor speak. Even though he behaves like a wild beast, Sun-yi's kindhearted mother adopts him and names him Chul-soo, assuming he's one of more than 60,000 children orphaned in the Korean War.

At first, Sun-yi considers him a nuisance, but eventually has fun taming him according to a dog-training manual. She teaches him how to wait patiently before a meal, how to wear clothes, speak, write, and other human behavior so that he could one day live like a normal man. Chul-soo demonstrates unswerving loyalty and superhuman brawn, inspiring the envy of Ji-tae, who lusts after Sun-yi.

The two eventually become close; as Sun-yi opens her heart to Chul-soo, he in turn falls in love with her, the only person to ever show him affection. But their relationship is fraught with difficulties as Ji-tae begins to cause trouble. Feeling threatened, Chul-soo lets loose his bestial instincts and in their fear, the town villagers turn on him. In order to save the boy who risked his life to be with her, Sun-yi leaves him with a promise: "Wait for me. I'll come back for you."

In present day, Sun-yi walks into the shed to find Chul-soo sitting there, still as young as he was 47 years ago. He hands her the note that she wrote. She realizes that he's been waiting all along. He reads her a book she had asked him to read all those years ago, as she falls asleep. The next day, she wakes up with Chul-soo nowhere in sight, and leaves with her granddaughter. They receive a call from the county asking about the property. Sun-yi tells him that she's not selling the place. Chul-soo stares from afar as the car drives away.

A sequence in the ending credits shows Chul-soo building a snowman.

== Cast ==
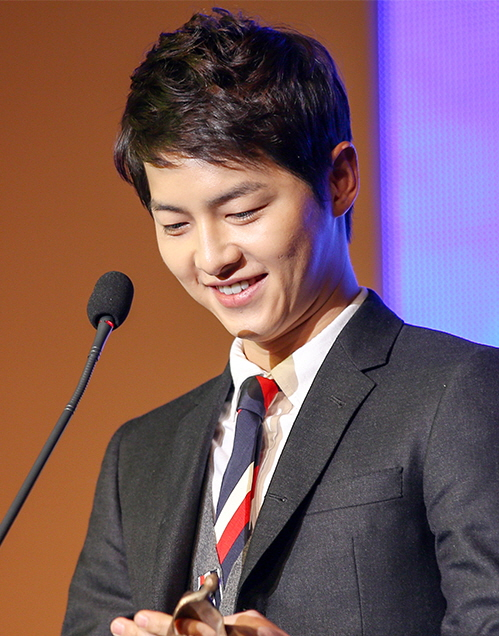
Song Joong-ki plays the main protagonist Chul-soo.

- Song Joong-ki as Chul-soo
- Park Bo-young as young Kim Sun-yi / Kim Eun-joo
  - Lee Young-ran as old Kim Sun-yi
- Jang Young-nam as Sun-yi's mother
- Yoo Yeon-seok as Ji-tae
- Kim Hyang-gi as Kim Sun-ja
- Yoo Seung-mok as Professor Kang Tae-shik
- Seo Dong-soo as army colonel
- Woo Jeong-guk as Mr. Jung
- Go Bon-im as Mrs. Jung
- Nam Jung-hee as Dong-seok's grandmother
- Ahn Do-gyu as Dong-seok
- Shin Bi as Dong-mi
- Lee Jun-hyeok as policeman
- Oh Yeong-seok as policeman
- Lee Sung-ju as Sun-yi's son
- Jang Seo-yi as Sun-yi's daughter-in-law
- Jo Jae-yun as Sun-yi's grandson

== Music ==
The film's music video featured John Park's single "철부지" ("Childlike").

"My Prince," the song that Sun-yi sings in the film, was released as a digital single and included in the soundtrack. It was composed by music director Shim Hyun-jung with lyrics by director Jo Sung-hee.

=== Soundtrack ===
1. 나의 왕자님 ("My prince") – Park Bo-young
2. Time she's forgotten
3. 47 years ago
4. A boy in the house
5. Decision to train him
6. Sun-yi's family
7. Chul-soo in the bath
8. First love
9. Training
10. Let's go to play
11. Cosplay
12. Where there's love
13. Special power
14. Turning to wolf
15. Discover the secret
16. She collapses
17. Ji-tae's anger
18. Chul-soo in chains
19. Evil plan
20. Searching for guitar
21. Out of control
22. To the forest
23. Love unreached
24. Don't leave me
25. Walking away
26. For a long time
27. A werewolf boy

== Reception ==
After premiering at number one in the South Korean box office with more than 100,000 admissions, A Werewolf Boy broke the 1 million mark after five days, 2 million after nine days, and 3.6 million in twelve days. Not only were these numbers remarkably high for November, considered a slow season for moviegoing in Korea, but it was also a rare feat for its melodrama genre.

The film also has the distinction of setting a new box office record for "suneung day," the date on which high school seniors take their College Scholastic Ability Test. Each year large numbers of students book tickets for films in the evening after the exam has finished, but A Werewolf Boy's one-day score of 341,475 tickets on November 8 outpaced the totals of any film in previous years.

On November 15, its 4.12 million admissions surpassed Architecture 101 to become the most successful Korean melodrama of all time. Ticket sales reached 5 million on November 18, 6 million on November 26, then 7 million on December 16, making it the third highest Korean top grosser of 2012, behind The Thieves and Masquerade, and also the fourth best selling film of the year overall.

The film also became a sleeper hit when it was released in Taiwan on December 28, 2012, grossing NT$4 million (US$138,000) at the Taipei box office after 17 days on release.

The film also made its premiere in the Philippines on September 18, 2013 as part of the Korean Movie Festival 2013.

== Alternate ending ==
After director Jo Sung-hee revealed during one of the film's Q&A sessions that they had shot an alternate ending, due to popular demand, the movie was re-released on December 6, 2012 with that ending. The alternate finale involves Park Bo-young's Sun-yi, and among the deleted scenes are moments from Ji-tae's (Yoo Yeon-seok) childhood as well as more focus on the neighborhood in which the plot unfolds.

== Book ==
A novelization was published on October 31, 2012, to coincide with the movie's opening day.

== Adaptation ==
A Philippine adaptation of the film of the same title has been announced on September 29, 2025 with a teaser. In November 2025, it was reported that the project is a co-production between Viva Films, Studio Viva, and CJ ENM, directed by Crisanto B. Aquino. Rabin Angeles and Angela Muji were cast in the lead roles, alongside Lorna Tolentino.

== Awards and nominations ==
Year	Award	Category	Recipient	Result
2012	4th Pierson Movie Festival	Best Actress	Park Bo-young	Won
2012	20th Korean Culture and Entertainment Awards	Best Supporting Actor	Seo Dong-soo	Won
2013	4th KOFRA Film Awards (Korea Film Reporters Association)	Discovery Award	Jo Sung-hee	Won
2013	7th Asian Film Awards	Best Costume Design	Kwak Jung-ae	Nominated
2013	6th Nickelodeon Korea Kids' Choice Awards	Favorite Actor	Song Joong-ki	Won
2013	49th Baeksang Arts Awards	Best Film	A Werewolf Boy	Nominated
2013	49th Baeksang Arts Awards	Best New Director	Jo Sung-hee	Won
2013	49th Baeksang Arts Awards	Best Actor (Film)	Song Joong-ki	Nominated
2013	49th Baeksang Arts Awards	Best Screenplay	Jo Sung-hee	Nominated
2013	49th Baeksang Arts Awards	Most Popular Actress (Film)	Park Bo-young	Nominated
2013	5th Terracotta Far East Film Festival	Current Asian Cinema Audience Award	Jo Sung-hee	Won
2013	7th Mnet 20's Choice Awards	20's Movie Star – Female	Park Bo-young	Won
2013	7th Mnet 20's Choice Awards	20's Movie Star – Male	Song Joong-ki	Nominated
2013	22nd Buil Film Awards	Best Supporting Actress	Jang Young-nam	Won
2013	22nd Buil Film Awards	Best Music	Shim Hyun-jung	Nominated
2013	50th Grand Bell Awards	Best Supporting Actress	Jang Young-nam	Won
2013	50th Grand Bell Awards	Best New Director	Jo Sung-hee	Nominated
2013	50th Grand Bell Awards	Popularity Award	Song Joong-ki	Nominated
2013	50th Grand Bell Awards	Popularity Award	Park Bo-young	Nominated
2013	34th Blue Dragon Film Awards	Best New Director	Jo Sung-hee	Nominated
2013	34th Blue Dragon Film Awards	Best Supporting Actress	Jang Young-nam	Nominated
