= Hearty Paws 2 =

- Film poster
- Hangul: 마음이 2
- RR: Maeumi 2
- MR: Maŭmi 2
- Directed by: Lee Jung-chul
- Written by: Kim Hwang-seong; Lee Jung-chul; Yoo Jae-hwan; Yoo Kyung-eun
- Starring: Dal-i; Sung Dong-il; Kim Jung-tae; Song Joong-ki
- Cinematography: Choi Sang-mook
- Production companies: Hwain Works; Beijing Antaeus Film
- Distributed by: Lotte Entertainment
- Release date: July 21, 2010 (South Korea)
- Running time: 92 minutes
- Country: South Korea
- Language: Korean

Hearty Paws 2 (Korean: 마음이 2; RR: Maeumi 2) is a South Korean drama film directed by Lee Jung-chul. It was released in South Korea by Lotte Entertainment on July 21, 2010.

== Cast ==
- Dal-i as Maeumi
- Sung Dong-il as Hyuk-pil
- Kim Jung-tae as Doo-pil
- Song Joong-ki as Dong-wook
- Hans Zhang as Zaoming
- Wang Seok-hyeon as video store patron
