= GAT (group) =

Filipino boy band

- Origin: Philippines
- Genres: P-pop
- Years active: 2025–present
- Label: Ivory Music
- Members: Ethan; Charles; Michael; Hans; Derick

Gat (stylized in all caps) is a Filipino boy band under Ivory Music and managed by Viva Artists Agency. The group is composed of five members: Ethan, Charles, Michael, Hans, and Derick.

== Name ==
The group's name carries layered meaning. It is derived from Gat, a Tagalog honorific historically used to denote nobility, as in Gatdula. It was occasionally used during the Spanish colonial period to refer to notable Filipino figures, similar to "Sir" in English. The group's name also function as an acronym for Gawang Atin 'To (lit. 'Made by Us'), reflecting the group's focus on promoting Filipino talent and creativity. The name was chosen to highlight both cultural heritage and a modern, youth-driven artistic approach.

== History ==
=== 2024-2025: Formation and Pre-Debut ===
GAT was formed in mid-2024 through an extensive talent search by Viva Artists Agency, bringing together members with diverse backgrounds in singing, dancing and acting. The group spent nearly a year in intensive training before their official introduction.

GAT made their first official public appearance in early 2025 with the release of a dance performance video of their pre-debut song, a cover of James Reid's hit song "Huwag Ka Nang Humirit" (lit. 'Don't push further'), which dropped on January 10, 2025, which showcased their vocal blend and modern R&B influences. The group made their first live television performance on Eat Bulaga! on TV5 on February 8, 2025.

Their follow-up pre-debut single, "Daleng Dale" (lit. 'You really got it')—a rendition of MMJ's original song—was part of the soundtrack for the Viva One's teen drama Ang Mutya ng Section E. GAT members Ethan, Charles, Michael and Derick also played supporting roles in the series. The music video of "Daleng Dale" was launched on the group's official YouTube page on April 2, 2025.

On March 15, 2025, GAT made their first musical festival performance at the Fusion: The Philippine Music Festival in the CCP Open Grounds.

GAT's Ethan David apologized on May 8, 2025 for a video showing him enacting a sexual joke with dancer Shawn Castro. Bini's Jhoanna was also seen in the clip, with fans speculating that a few of the voices that could be heard in the video belonged to two other Bini members. Ethan, via his management, took responsibility, affirmed respect for women, and said the video didn't reflect his values.

In June, 2025, GAT was named part of Billboard Philippines’ "P-Pop Rising Class" alongside Alamat, BGYO, KAIA, G22, and Vxon, recognizing their rising prominence in the P-pop genre.

GAT performed alongside Viva artists Amiel Sol, Earl Agustin, and Rob Deniel at the Ang Mutya ng Section E: OST Live in Concert on June 20, 2025 at the New Frontier Theater in Quezon City, celebrating the series’ soundtrack.

=== 2025: Debut ===
The group made its official debut with the release of the single, "Kakaiba" (lit. 'Unique') on August 1, 2025. They performed the song on Eat Bulaga! on August 8, 2025 with Rabin Angeles. GAT performed at the Viva One Vivarkada: The Ultimate Fancon and Grand Concert on August 15, 2025 at the Smart Araneta Coliseum in Quezon City. The concert showcased Viva's pool of young artists like Andres Muhlach, Atasha Muhlach and Ashtine Olviga.

GAT's viral single, "Daleng-Dale" was announced as one of the official nominees for the People's Choice Awards: Song at the inaugural Filipino Music Awards, held on October 21, 2025 at the SM Mall of Asia Arena in Pasay City.

== Members ==
- Ethan David
- Charles Law
- Micheal Keith
- Hans Paronda
- Derick Ong

== Discography ==
=== Singles ===
List of singles, showing year released, selected chart positions, and associated albums
Title	Year	Peak chart positions	Album	Ref.
Title	Year	PHL (Note: Peak chart positions for songs on the Philippines Hot 100 charts)	Album	Ref.
"Huwag Ka Nang Humirit" (Note: James Reid cover, Pre-debut single)	2025	—	Non-album single	
"Daleng Dale" (Note: MMJ cover, Pre-debut single)	2025	—	Ang Mutya Ng Section E OST	
"Rainbow" (Note: South Border cover, Pre-debut single)	2025	—	Non-album single	
"Marikit" (Note: Juan Caoile and Kyleswish cover, Pre-debut single)	2025	—	Non-album single	
"Kakaiba"	2025	—	Non-album single	
"Kembot"	2025	—	Non-album single	
"Kapag Ngumingiti Ka"	2026	—	Non-album single	

== Filmography ==
=== Music Videos ===
Year	Title	Director	Ref.
2025	"Daleng Dale"	Jay-Ar Villarojas	
2025	"Kakaiba"	Jay-Ar Villarojas	

=== Television ===
==== As guest appearance ====
Year	Date	Program	Network	Ref.
2025	February 8	Eat Bulaga!	TV5, RPTV	
2025	March 21	Gud Morning Kapatid	TV5, RPTV	
2025	March 22	Eat Bulaga!	TV5, RPTV	
2025	March 25	TiktoClock	GMA	
2025	May 26	Gud Morning Kapatid	TV5, RPTV	
2025	July 26	Sing Galing!	TV5	
2025	August 8	Eat Bulaga!	TV5, RPTV	
2025	August 19	It's Showtime	Kapamilya Channel, A2Z, ALLTV, GMA	

== Awards and nominations ==
Name of the award ceremony, year presented, category, nominee of the award, and the result of the nomination
Award ceremony	Year	Category	Nominee / Work	Result	Ref.
VP Choice Awards	2026	Rising P-pop Group	GAT	Pending	

=== Listicles ===
Name of publisher, name of listicle, year listed, and placement result
Publisher	Listicle	Year	Result	Ref.
Billboard Philippines	P-pop Rising Class	2025	Placed	
