= ASAP (TV program) =

Philippine television variety show

- Title card since May 17, 2026
- Genre: Variety show
- Created by: Roldeo T. Endrinal; Johnny Manahan
- Written by: Leo Bernardo; Darla Sauler (2018–2025); Marc Noveloso (since 2026)
- Directed by: Johnny Manahan (1995–2020); Joane Laygo (since 2018); Jon Moll (since 2026)
- Creative director: Darla Sauler
- Presented by: Martin Nievera; Zsa Zsa Padilla; Gary Valenciano; Erik Santos; Kyle Echarri; Luis Manzano; Kim Chiu; Maymay Entrata; Darren Espanto; Ogie Alcasid; Regine Velasquez; Janine Gutierrez; Robi Domingo; Belle Mariano; James Reid; Kai Montinola; Alexa Ilacad; Donny Pangilinan
- Narrated by: Bob Novales (since 1995); Peter Musñgi (since 1995) (Note: Main narrator for introductions, promotional teasers used by ABS-CBN (1995–2020), Kapamilya Channel (since 2020) and All TV (since 2026), and on narrations during show proper.); Jeremy Domingo (2003, since 2012) (Note: Narrator for promotional teasers used by Studio 23 (2003) and Jeepney TV (since 2012).); Lloyd Oliver Corpuz (since 2020) (Note: Narrator for promotional teasers used by A2Z.); Mitch "Super Mitch" Amurao (2021–2025) (Note: Narrator for promotional teasers used by TV5.); Beng Chua (since 2024); Archie "The Hitman" Zapanta (since 2025)
- Opening theme: "Hot na Hot ang ASAP" (1995–1997) "Better than Ever" (1997–2000, 2013) "ASAP Let's Celebrate" (2015) "Together Forever, ASAP Forever" (since 2026)
- Country of origin: Philippines
- Original languages: Filipino; English

Production
- Executive producers: Eugenio G. Lopez III (1995–2013); Johnny Manahan (1995–2020); Roldeo T. Endrinal (1995–2024); Freddie M. Garcia (1997–2003); Luis F. Alejandro (2004–2006); Charo Santos-Concio (2013–2016); Carlo L. Katigbak (since 2016); Cory V. Vidanes; Laurenti M. Dyogi; Luis L. Andrada
- Producers: Joyce Liquicia (1995–2018); Jasmin Pallera (since 2018)
- Production locations: Delta Theater, Quezon City, Philippines (1995–1997); Studio 3, ABS-CBN Broadcasting Center, Quezon City, Philippines (1997–2004); Studio 10, ABS-CBN Broadcasting Center, Quezon City, Philippines (2004–2026)
- Editors: Cedric Flores; TJ Payumo; Adones Abarquez; Dennis Salgado
- Camera setup: Multiple-camera setup
- Running time: 105 minutes
- Production companies: ABS-CBN Studios (since 1995); TV5 Entertainment (since 2026)

Original release
- Network: ABS-CBN
- Release: February 5, 1995 – May 3, 2020
- Network: Kapamilya Channel (Note: Following the cease-and-desist order against ABS-CBN's free to air assets, the show resumed air on Kapamilya Channel, with simulcasts on A2Z, Jeepney TV, Metro Channel, TV5 (January 24, 2021 – December 28, 2025; since October 18, 2026) and All TV (since January 4, 2026).)
- Release: June 14, 2020 – present

ASAP (Note: Now commonly pronounced as ah-sap but sometimes still pronounced by spelling out the initials.) (an abbreviation of its original full name, All-Star Sunday Afternoon Party, currently known as All-Star Sunday Awesome Party) is a Philippine television variety show broadcast by ABS-CBN and Kapamilya Channel. Originally hosted by Martin Nievera, Pops Fernandez, Ariel Rivera, and Dayanara Torres, it premiered on February 5, 1995, on the network's Sunday afternoon line up. Nievera, Zsa Zsa Padilla, Gary Valenciano, Erik Santos, Darren Espanto, Kim Chiu, Ogie Alcasid, Regine Velasquez, Kyle Echarri, Luis Manzano, Robi Domingo, Donny Pangilinan, James Reid, Maymay Entrata, Alexa Ilacad, Belle Mariano, Janine Gutierrez and Kai Montinola currently serve as the hosts. It is the longest-running musical variety show on Philippine television.

== History ==
=== ASAP's first decade (1995–2003) ===
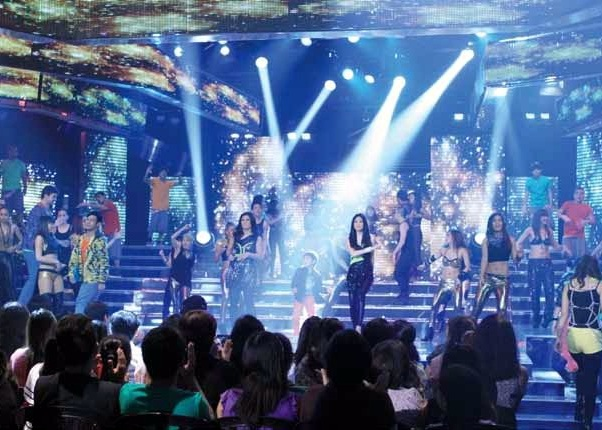
The set of ASAP (2011–2013) showing live performances aided by multiple LED displays

When Sa Linggo nAPO Sila became 'Sang Linggo nAPO Sila to replace Eat Bulaga! (which left ABS-CBN to go to GMA after then-producer TAPE Inc. (show now produced by TVJ Productions on TV5 and RPTV) denied ABS-CBN's offer to buy the airing rights of the show), a TV show was conceptualized by Deo Endrinal with a group of production people from the displaced APO show in January 1995 as a "concert party" on Sundays.

Martin Nievera accidentally joined the group while on break from taping his eponymous talk show. He gave the show the title acronym ASAP which stood for All-Star Sunday Afternoon Party. The production group decided to bring him and Pops Fernandez, along with Ariel Rivera and Dayanara Torres, as main hosts for the show. The cast of Pare Ko (Claudine Barretto, Victor Neri, Roselle Nava, Gio Alvarez, Jao Mapa, Mark Anthony Fernandez, Nikka Valencia) became co-hosts for the show to attract younger audiences.

In 1996, the show's line-up of co-hosts and performers evolved as it included different young stars from ABS-CBN's Talent Center (Ang TV, Gimik and Star Circle). The show also celebrated its first anniversary as it finally wrested the top spot away from its closest rival, GMA Supershow. The show became victorious in 1997 as they celebrated their 2nd anniversary from the Araneta Coliseum, as their former institutional rival show GMA Supershow folded up; Supershow was replaced by SOP.

The show originally had its own theme song, "Hot na Hot sa ASAP", in 1995. During the show's second anniversary, another theme song was released, entitled "Better Than Ever", to replace the original theme. Initial broadcast commenced on February 5, 1995, at the Delta Theatre on Quezon Avenue. In 1997, the show was transferred to Studio 3 of the ABS-CBN Broadcasting Center in Quezon City, sharing space with 'Sang Linggo nAPO Sila. However, it suffered a setback on May 10, 1998, when one of the main hosts, Martin Nievera, resigned from the show because of marital issues with co-host (and now ex-wife) Pops Fernandez, and also to focus on his eponymous late night talk show. Dayanara Torres later left the show to pursue a career in Hollywood. Richard Gomez and Zsa Zsa Padilla became regular hosts from that time, as replacements for Nievera and Torres.

On February 7, 1999, the show celebrated its 4th anniversary, via a simultaneous broadcast from the Cuneta Astrodome, in Pasay, and the University of St. La Salle Coliseum, in Bacolod City, to usher the second season of the MBA. Magandang Tanghali Bayan main hosts Randy Santiago, John Estrada, and Willie Revillame helped in hosting ASAP from Bacolod while the main hosts were in Cuneta Astrodome. In the same year, the show celebrated the finales of top-rating soaps Mula sa Puso and Esperanza with a grand production number.

In 2001, the producers added the tagline "The Only One" to the show's title to emphasize its uniqueness amidst the rise of shows duplicating its concept. On March 11 of the same year, the show created new sensations out of "The Hunks", a new group composed of long-time Kapamilya heartthrobs Piolo Pascual, Diether Ocampo, Jericho Rosales, Carlos Agassi, and Bernard Palanca. Their phenomenal success as a group made noise around Philippine entertainment circles as they stormed their way through various appearances within ABS-CBN shows and concerts abroad. ASAP's rival show SOP even got wind of the group's popularity by creating a parody group, "Da HungHunks".

In April of the same year, Martin Nievera officially returned to ASAP as a main host after three years of hiatus due to his marital issues with Fernandez.

In 2002, the show lost former co-host and occasional guest Rico Yan to pancreatitis, while Jolina Magdangal left ASAP and transferred to GMA Network to join SOP, along with Marvin Agustin who would transfer in 2006. It also became the go-to show for the premieres of ABS-CBN Summer and Christmas station IDs by that period, until 2015, when TV Patrol and It's Showtime changed venues (although it later became the venue for the premiere of ABS-CBN's 2018 Christmas ID and 2021 Summer ID). The show also introduced daring segments such as "Rated R" (headed by Rica Peralejo) and "Clash Dance" (Regine Tolentino and Angela Velez).

In April of the same year, Richard Gomez left the show when his contract with ABS-CBN expired and moved to rival network GMA.

In February 2003, ASAP celebrated its 8th anniversary with another special show at the Araneta Coliseum. The anniversary show was remembered for the launch of the year-long celebration of ABS-CBN's 50th year of Philippine television. At that time, there was a major controversy when Angela Velez suddenly had a wardrobe malfunction while dancing on stage.

On that same period until June 2003, the show was simulcast on ABS-CBN's sister station Studio 23 (now under the ownership of Aliw Broadcasting Corporation as RPTV's half-sister station Aliw Channel 23).

=== ASAP Mania (2003–2005) ===
In April 2003, the show was reformatted as ASAP Mania, after it lost its top-rating status to SOP Rules. Consequently, some original main hosts, such as Ariel Rivera and Pops Fernandez, later left the show, while Martin Nievera and Zsa Zsa Padilla started hosting the show on a semi-regular basis. The biggest talent acquisitions of the show, however, were Gary Valenciano and Kuh Ledesma, who replaced Rivera and Fernandez. Valenciano and Ledesma signed exclusive contracts with ABS-CBN and also had creative input to make the show more interesting. In addition, Valenciano also celebrated his 20th showbiz anniversary on the show earlier that year.

Some ASAP segments such as "Star in a Million" and "Victim" became such hits with the viewers that the ABS-CBN management decided to turn both segments into full-length shows on weekend primetime in November of that year. The move resulted in the network regaining lost audience share on weekends as both shows were rated highly against their rival counterparts.

In 2004, ASAP gradually regained leadership with the addition of singing champions from Viva-produced singing contests Star for a Night, on IBC, and Search for a Star, on GMA Network, (Sarah Geronimo, Mark Bautista, and Rachelle Ann Go) and ABS-CBN's very own Star in a Million (Sheryn Regis, Christian Bautista, and Erik Santos) along with their runners-up.

==== ASAP Fanatic (2004–2005) ====
In May 2004, ASAP launched a youth-oriented spin-off, ASAP Fanatic, to serve as a venue for its new young stars (some of which came from Star Circle Quest) to perform and interact with fans. First-generation housemates and cast of Pinoy Big Brother would later join the spin-off in 2005. The show held a special advanced anniversary episode on October 10 of the same year at the Folk Arts Theater and the PhilSports Arena.

=== ASAP '05; use of year logos (2005–2009) ===
In 2005, the format changed to ASAP '05 and added rising TV host Toni Gonzaga and commercial-model-turned-singer Nikki Gil. From that year until 2009, the show's name featured the last two digits of the year (e.g. ASAP '08 in 2008).

In 2006, the show absorbed talent from the displaced spin-off show ASAP Fanatic and became a three-hour show. It also launched a somewhat complicated logo resembling LED lights, where the words ASAP were made out of connected dots, which had been in use until 2015. Also in January of that same year, boxing legend Manny Pacquiao guested on the show.

On June 18, 2006, Kim Chiu and Gerald Anderson performed for the first time on the ASAP stage, following their stint on Pinoy Big Brother: Teen Edition 1. A few months later, the ASAP Pop Viewers' Choice Awards was launched, where the best in domestic pop culture was honored.

In February 2007, Asia's Nightingale, Lani Misalucha, joined the show on a temporary basis while ex-SOP performers Karylle (daughter of Zsa Zsa Padilla) and Billy Crawford followed suit in 2008. The show also rolled out a grand welcome fit for royalty when it introduced then-Kapuso Primetime actress Angel Locsin as the newest Kapamilya actress in August, and the following month, KC Concepcion, after her long stay in Paris.

On January 27, 2008, the show was aired from different locations as it also officially started the 55th anniversary celebrations of ABS-CBN.

The year 2009 saw milestones for the show, as it launched new groups including the Kanto Boys and Sessionistas. Midway through that year, the ratings of its rival show SOP declined due to ASAP again completely regaining the credibility, prestige, and acclaim it once lost to the former. As a result, its rival show reformatted before that same year ended, but the move no longer worked with the viewers. The show also paid tribute to Efren Peñaflorida, who was hailed as CNN Hero, as well as former President Corazon Aquino, in August, (who happens to be the mother of recurring guest star Kris Aquino).

=== ASAP XV, ASAP Rocks, ASAP 2012 (2010–2015) ===
On January 3, 2010, the show was relaunched as ASAP XV to mark its fifteenth anniversary. Year numbers in the show title weren't adapted but instead anniversary marks were used. America's Best Dance Crew champion Jabbawockeez also became guest performers since then. During the show's special anniversary episode on February 7, 2010, a new set was introduced and an opening break bumper (OBB) was instituted for the first time. Competition became a three-way battle when GMA Network (Party Pilipinas) and TV5 (P.O.5) produced their own "concert party" shows, where some of their talents and staff were ASAP alumni. In October of that same year, the show celebrated the diamond anniversary of another valued advertiser of ABS-CBN, P&G Philippines, and Carol Banawa guested once again to promote her new album.

On January 2, 2011, the show was launched as ASAP Rocks as a way of asserting its over-the-top but tastefully conceptualized production numbers, and the first episode for 2011 began with a short audio–visual presentation (AVP) emphasizing the "concert experience" format. On April 3, 2011, a new set was introduced, and for the first time in show's history, the show welcomed the Eat Bulaga! main host Vic Sotto as a special guest, performing in the show twice (April and December 2011) to promote separately the two movies that he did for ABS-CBN's film arm Star Cinema. In his December 2011 guesting, Vic was joined by some of his Eat Bulaga! co-hosts on stage to promote the MMFF entry Enteng ng Ina Mo. All of these moments occurred before both Eat Bulaga! and ASAP being aired together on TV5 twelve years later. The show also lost its two former co-hosts and performers AJ Perez and RJ Rosales that same year, due to their deaths.

On January 1, 2012, the show again used year numbers, after they were last used in 2009, with ASAP 2012. On January 22 of that same year, the show celebrated the Chinese New Year through a special episode taped at the Quirino Grandstand. The following month, Sarah Geronimo temporarily left the show as she was given her own primetime show, Sarah G. Live. July of that year saw the show making milestone episodes which include the 20th anniversary of Star Magic, a farewell tribute to Comedy King Dolphy Quizon in the wake of his death, and the 50th and 30th showbiz anniversaries of Vilma Santos and Martin Nievera, respectively. In August of that year, the show gave support to its main host Zsa Zsa Padilla as she battled a kidney disease before returning in September. On December 16 of that year, Venezuelan actor Fernando Carrillo guested on the show during his visit to the Philippines.

On January 6, 2013, the show again used anniversary numbers to indicate the years it aired on TV, after such were last used in 2010, with ASAP 18 to commemorate the show's 18th anniversary.

On February 24 of that same year, the show had a controversial segment wherein actress and host Anne Curtis sang "Diamonds" by Rihanna for her birthday presentation, wearing a black high-slit dress under fake rain. The performance sparked a debate over her undergarments and later became one of the subjects of a Congressional hearing on ABS-CBN's franchise renewal seven years later. The program was later summoned before the Movie and Television Review and Classification Board (MTRCB).

ASAP's second theme song, "Better than Ever", was re-used for the show's summer opening billboard from March 17 to May 26, 2013. Months later, on October 6, the show celebrated the 60th anniversary of ABS-CBN and Philippine television with a special episode held at the Marikina Sports Complex.

On January 5, 2014, the show was relaunched as ASAP 19 to commemorate the show's 19th anniversary along with a special segment paying tribute to Lea Salonga for her 35th showbiz anniversary. The show also broadcast its 1,000th episode on April 6 of that same year.

On January 4, 2015, the show was relaunched as ASAP 20 to commemorate the show's 20th anniversary. It launched a new, simple logo that replaced the one being used since 2006 (although the 2006 ASAP LED logo is used on the show's teaser for the said date); and, from that point, Piolo Pascual, Sarah Geronimo, Toni Gonzaga, and Bamboo became main hosts of the show, as seen in their logo animation (which was usually used before commercial breaks). The show unveiled its third theme song "ASAP Let's Celebrate", used during the show's 20th anniversary opening billboard (OBB).

Also during that time, the tide tilted in favor of ASAP once again when some mainstays from their rival shows transferred networks and started appearing on the show. Among the notable transfers were actress Iza Calzado, R&B royalty Jay-R and Kyla, and StarStruck V Ultimate Female Survivor Sarah Lahbati, who also performed regularly while showing her dance moves after a bitter falling out with her former network.

In August 2015, the show faced another challenge when they got into a ratings battle with GMA's new Sunday variety show Sunday PinaSaya (the program that replacing Sunday All Stars) that showcased the vaudeville format (more comedy skits than musical numbers). The show had to make adjustments by reducing the musical production numbers and incorporating more of a variety format of games and skits. ASAP original host Martin Nievera courted controversy when he vented his ire over the show's changes via Twitter, but later clarified his reaction, saying he believes these changes in the format of the show are a way to "satisfy many markets with dignity and class". Conceding to Sunday Pinasaya's rising popularity, the ABS-CBN management decided to revert ASAP to its original concert party format and cut the show's running time to 2 hours aired from 12:00 NN to 2:00 PM, to accommodate the late-night comedy show Banana Split Extra Scoop which was renamed to Banana Sundae in mid-November 2015 aired from 2:00 PM to 3:00 PM. A few weeks later, Elmo Magalona, son of Philippine King of Rap Francis Magalona, switched networks and became part of the show.

=== ASAP's second decade (2015–2018) ===
Logo used from January 4, 2015 to November 11, 2018.

On January 3, 2016, for the second time in 13 years, the show was titled just ASAP. Jolina Magdangal and Luis Manzano became main hosts of the show. On January 10 of the same year, the show paid tribute to their erstwhile rival GMA Supershow's "Master Showman" German Moreno, who died two days prior.

In February 2016, another singing contest grand winner from the GMA Network, Jonalyn Viray transferred to ABS-CBN under the screen name Jona and officially joined the show. A few weeks later, ASAP moved to an earlier timeslot, at 11:45 AM, and extended its runtime to 2 hours and 45 minutes. Meanwhile, the comedy gag show Banana Sundae was transferred to a later timeslot, at 2:30 PM.

On May 15, 2016, ASAP launched two singing groups: the ASAP Birit Queens, an all-female vocal group composed of Jona Viray, Morissette, Klarisse de Guzman, and Angeline Quinto; and the ASAP Soul Sessions, a soul/R&B vocal group composed of Jason Dy, Daryl Ong, Jay R, KZ Tandingan, and Kyla. However, both groups disbanded in late 2017 as part of the show's introduction of new segments that were more youthful. Two weeks later, the show celebrated the 25th anniversary of MMK with Charo Santos-Concio as a guest who paid tribute to the latter show's impact on Philippine television.

On July 3 of that year, the show instituted a new segment, "ASAPinoy", paying tribute to Filipino composers and singers who contributed to the success of Original Pilipino Music (OPM), with a special episode held at the Newport Performing Arts Theater. By October of the same year, the show welcomed Ogie Alcasid as a regular performer after a few years of guest appearances. However, this segment ended in October 2018 with Ariel Rivera as the last artist paid tribute to, followed by Rico J. Puno during the Himig Handog 2018 Finals after his death.

On May 21, 2017, ASAP staged a special episode at the Smart Araneta Coliseum in celebration of Star Magic's 25th anniversary and was soon divided into two parts. The first part was staged live, while the second part (aired the following week) was pre-taped.

In January 2018, ASAP replaced their existing segments with new segments, including "ASAP TLC: The Love Connection" replacing "ASAP LSS: Love Songs and Stories", and adding "ASAP RePlay Retro Playlist", which honored legendary international acts. On April 15 of that year, ASAP launched a dance segment titled "ASAP MYX: The Maja-Yassi Xperience" and, in June, a teen singing group called ASAP G!.

=== ASAP Natin 'To, ASAP XP and the 2020s decade (2018–present) ===
Logo used from November 18, 2018 to August 25, 2024.

After ASAP Live in Sydney and the Himig Handog 2018 Grand Finals, it was confirmed through different showbiz websites that the show would undergo a reformat as ASAP Natin 'To which also coincided with the entry of Regine Velasquez as one of the show's main hosts. Jasmin Pallera was named as the new supervising producer/business unit head of the show, replacing long-time business unit head Joyce Liquicia. Some of the show's cast were retained, contrary to reports that some of them would not be seen on the show. On November 15, 2018, all social media accounts of ASAP unveiled the teaser and the new logo of the now revitalized show, to be renamed ASAP Natin 'To. Only the typeface, since 2015, continues to be used; no segments from the previous era were carried over.

The reformatted show premiered on November 18, 2018, a week after the Himig Handog 2018 Grand Finals. On December 2, 2018, a new online show, iWant ASAP, was launched, hosted by Robi Domingo, Donny Pangilinan, Maymay Entrata, and Edward Barber. The online show airs at 11:30 am PHT, 15 minutes before the airing of ASAP Natin 'To, replacing ASAP Chillout.

On December 2, 2018, the show launched their first segment under the new format entitled "The Greatest Showdown", which featured various singers. As of now, Martin Nievera, Pops Fernandez, Ariel Rivera, Sharon Cuneta, and Jolina Magdangal are the only original artists remaining since the show's first airing in 1995.

On January 5, 2020, the same day current rival program All-Out Sundays premiered on GMA, ASAP Natin' To celebrated its 25th anniversary in advance, and also partly reverted to its original format.

On February 9, 2020, ASAP Natin 'To launched a new segment titled ASAP Concert Presents, with the Pair of Aces (Jona and Darren Espanto) performing on the first part of the segment.

On March 10, 2020, ASAP Natin 'To, along with other ABS-CBN shows, temporarily stopped the admission of live studio audiences as part of the country's fight against the COVID-19 pandemic in the Philippines, upon the country's declaration of a state of public health emergency. On March 15, 2020, as Metro Manila was placed under a community quarantine, the show stopped staging live episodes and aired replays for the first 2 weeks. Despite having a scheduled live episode to be staged on the said date; it was cancelled due to the already-imposed restrictions. The show later taped new episodes via remote work arrangements via Zoom, from March 29, 2020, onwards.

In April 2020, ASAP Natin 'To's airtime was shortened to one hour and moved to Banana Sundae's timeslot of 2:30 PM to 3:30 PM until May 3, 2020, which was its last airing before the shutdown of ABS-CBN's free-to-air stations. The move was part of ABS-CBN's temporary programming schedule due to the enhanced community quarantine imposed to combat the COVID-19 pandemic, and in response to rival network GMA extending Kapuso Movie Festival to a two-movie block, which made the network extend the Sunday edition of Kapamilya Blockbusters Family Weekend to two movies.

On May 5, 2020, the National Telecommunications Commission issued a cease and desist order against the ABS-CBN Corporation, forcing all of its free-to-air television and radio stations to temporarily suspend their operations, due to the expiration of its legislative franchise, causing ASAP, as well as the rest of ABS-CBN shows, to temporarily suspend their airings. This also making the show went on a 5 years and 7 months channels 2 and 16 in Mega Manila and regional channels frequencies that once held by ABS-CBN hiatus from May 3, 2020 to January 4, 2026, until its return to the former ABS-CBN's channel space through AMBS' All TV, which already airing ABS-CBN contents since April 15, 2024.

On June 14, 2020, the show resumed its in-studio taping/live staging (every 1st week of the month) of new episodes for broadcast on cable-and-satellite Kapamilya Channel, with a virtual audience in place of an actual studio audience while using artificial crowd noise. Also on the same day, iWant ASAP resumed its telecast via a remote work arrangement through Zoom Video Communications. Owing to COVID-19 safety precautions, the show entailed a 4-day lock-in taping set-up to produce 3 episodes per taping cycle, with only the episode done during the lock-in period being staged live from the studio itself.

In August 2020, ASAP was reduced to a 2-hour airtime again, since 2015, after the franchise renewal of ABS-CBN was denied by the House of Representatives of the Philippines.

In September 2020, ASAP's main director Johnny Manahan and cast members Piolo Pascual, Billy Crawford, Maja Salvador, Catriona Gray, Maris Racal, Donny Pangilinan, and Zephanie left the show. They were signed by independent television producer Brightlight Productions for new shows that would air on TV5 under a blocktime agreement between the network and the aforementioned production company. Manahan produced the daily noontime show Lunch Out Loud that would be hosted by Crawford and also directed the now-defunct Sunday noontime show Sunday Noontime Live! headlined by Piolo Pascual, Catriona Gray, Maja Salvador, Donny Pangilinan, and Jake Ejercito. Joane Laygo, who had been directing the show since the 2018 reformat, became the permanent main director of the show.

On October 11, 2020, the show went back on free TV via the newly launched A2Z Channel 11 under a blocktime agreement between the network and religious broadcaster ZOE Broadcasting Network. Also on the same day, the show returned to the 12:00 pm timeslot.

On January 24, 2021, ASAP Natin 'To began airing its simulcast as a blocktimer on TV5 as part of a reported partnership between ABS-CBN Studios and Cignal TV, which handles TV5's programming. Despite this development, the show continued airing on A2Z Channel 11, Kapamilya Channel, and Kapamilya Online Live.

In March 2021, certain performers who were part of Sunday Noontime Live!, such as Donny Pangilinan, Maris Racal, and Zephanie, returned to ASAP after their stint in the former show.

On April 4 and 11, 2021, ASAP Natin 'To temporarily aired replays of previous episodes as a result of suspending taping of new episodes that required live staging after airing two pre-taped episodes due to the reimposed enhanced community quarantine caused by the surge of COVID-19 cases and deaths in the Greater Manila Area due to the B.1.1.7 and B.1.351 variants of COVID-19. The show would resume airing new episodes on April 18, 2021.

Following the return to the studio after the COVID-19 surge, ASAP Natin 'To launched several new segments, such as "ASAP PPOP" (a segment for groups such as BINI and BGYO), New Gen Divas (an all-female vocal group composed of Janine Berdin, Elha Nympha, Sheena Belarmino, and Zephanie, who was later replaced by Fatima Lagueras, a.k.a. Fana, due to her transfer to the GMA Network in 2022), "ASAP Fresh", "ASAP Exclusive", "ASAP Discoveries", and "ASAP Transformation".

On July 11, 2021, ASAP aired a special episode titled "Kapamilya Forever Day" a year after ABS-CBN's franchise was denied by 70 congressmen.

On November 5, 2022, ASAP returned to the international scene after two years of hiatus due to the COVID-19 pandemic in the Philippines. Its first international show since the pandemic was held at the Orleans Arena in Las Vegas, Nevada. Originally, the show was going to be performed as part of Expo 2020, but the Expo was cancelled due to the surge of COVID-19 cases in the country due to the Omicron variant.

On January 8, 2023, ASAP introduced its new studio set. It was the first major redesign since 2017. Despite the change, the show still continued to do lock-in taping episodes for the later weeks, and airing replay episodes for the final week of each month while live audience episodes remained suspended indefinitely, even after the end of the COVID-19 emergency.

Headwriter Darla Sauler admitted on X (Twitter) that the non-renewal of ABS-CBN's franchise led to the program not to have a live studio audience (having initially suspended it when the country declared a state of public health emergency on COVID-19) and reruns at the last week of the month, with the COVID-19 restrictions in the country during the past few years being also another factor.

On February 4, 2024, the show celebrated its 29th anniversary. Coinciding with this, the show welcomed back live audiences for the first time since the beginning of the pandemic. The anniversary special also welcomed back some of ASAP's past hosts and performers, and paid tribute to ABS-CBN's Dreamscape Entertainment head and ASAP creator Deo Endrinal, who died the day before the anniversary show.

Title card used from September 1, 2024 to May 10, 2026.

On September 1, 2024, for the third time in 6 years, and in time for its 30th anniversary in 2025, the show was titled just ASAP. Maymay Entrata, Edward Barber, Kim Chiu, Janine Gutierrez, Robi Domingo, Belle Mariano, and Alexa Ilacad became main hosts of the show. However, the ASAP Natin 'To name and logo continued to be used as silent break bumper during commercial breaks on A2Z and TV5 from September 1, 2024 to December 28, 2025 as the show on both channels are clean independent broadcast feed from the main ABS-CBN/Kapamilya Channel one during its four-year TV5 airing period from January 24, 2021 to December 28, 2025.

ASAP went on a 9 months and 20 days (294 days) TV5 hiatus from December 28, 2025 to October 18, 2026 because of financial disputes involving blocktime fees which were subsequently settled. Due to this, the ASAP Natin 'To name and logo, used for 7 years, 1 month, and 10 days (2,597 days), and its associated silent break bumper during commercials on TV5 and A2Z, was discontinued starting with the January 4, 2026 episode as the show's A2Z airing was again integrated with or consolidated to the main ABS-CBN/Kapamilya Channel broadcast feed after 5 years restoring the commercial placement of its cable channel counterpart albeit now using the A2Z's silent bumper fully that has been in use since April 17, 2022 if the channel is connected to the said main feed instead of just a snippet of the 2020–2026 Kapamilya Channel one (used from June 13, 2020 to March 16, 2026) like with from October 11, 2020 to January 17, 2021.

However, the show resumed its TV5 airing on October 18, 2026 becoming now a co-production together with ABS-CBN Studios and using the ASAP XP bumper for TV5 that replaced the ASAP Natin' To one that was used from January 24, 2021 until its hiatus on December 2025. The announcement and the contract signing were held coinciding with the show's live taping for ASAP XP in Pampanga held at the Lapid Arena. With the co-production agreement, the Star Worx artists of the Kapatid network would now be part of the show's roster of performers and artists.

On March 22, 2026, the digital musical-variety show iWant ASAP bid farewell after being the show's online companion since 2018.

On May 2, 2026, ABS-CBN and ASAP through their social media pages released a teaser about the show's new rebranding and major changes, especially to the format and timeslot. As such, ASAP aired its final episode on its traditional Sunday noontime slot after 31 years on May 10, 2026 (its formerly occupied traditional Sunday noontime slot on Kapamilya platforms, which include those of the former ABS-CBN's Channel 2 space which currently used by All TV since 2022, were later takeover by a simulcast of the Sunday replays of TV5's Saturday primetime musical variety show Vibe+ on October 25, 2026 or seven months after the latter occupying the TV5's Sunday noontime slot on March 8, 2026), as the show moves to a new timeslot to primetime, rebranding into ASAP XP or All-Star Sunday Awesome Party on the following weeks. The said rebranding is now focusing on bringing the ASAP concert experience closer to the audience. Instead of the usual studio setups, they are focused into large-scale venues, out-of-town, and abroad shows in particular held at various locations (e.g. stadiums or arenas). It commenced with the 5-part TV broadcast of the sold-out ASAP XP Concert held at the Araneta Coliseum, alongside with the show unveiling its new theme song entitled, "Together Forever, ASAP Forever".

The show is reformatted as a primetime musical variety show and is now airing on a reduced airtime of 2 hours again, from 5:30 PM to 7:30 PM starting May 17, 2026, back-to-back with TV Patrol Weekend at 4:30 PM. But starting September 6, 2026, the show moved to its new timeslot at 6:00 PM to 7:30 PM, reducing its airtime to just 90 minutes.

For televiewers who are interested to watch the show live, they need to wait for ASAP XP's announcements on the show's social media accounts regarding the show's venue, time and date (usually on a Sunday). ASAP XP's live out-of-town shows consist of two taped shows (time will vary) which will be televised on succeeding Sundays. Tickets are on sale before the show proper and strict rules on safety protocols are enforced for the benefit of the audience, talents, hosts and staff.

And with the resume of the simulcast and with now co-production of ASAP XP to TV5 starting October 18, 2026, the runtime was expanded from 90 minutes to 105 minutes, airing on a new timeslot at 7:00 PM to 8:45 PM.

== Cast ==
Cast / Current Hosts

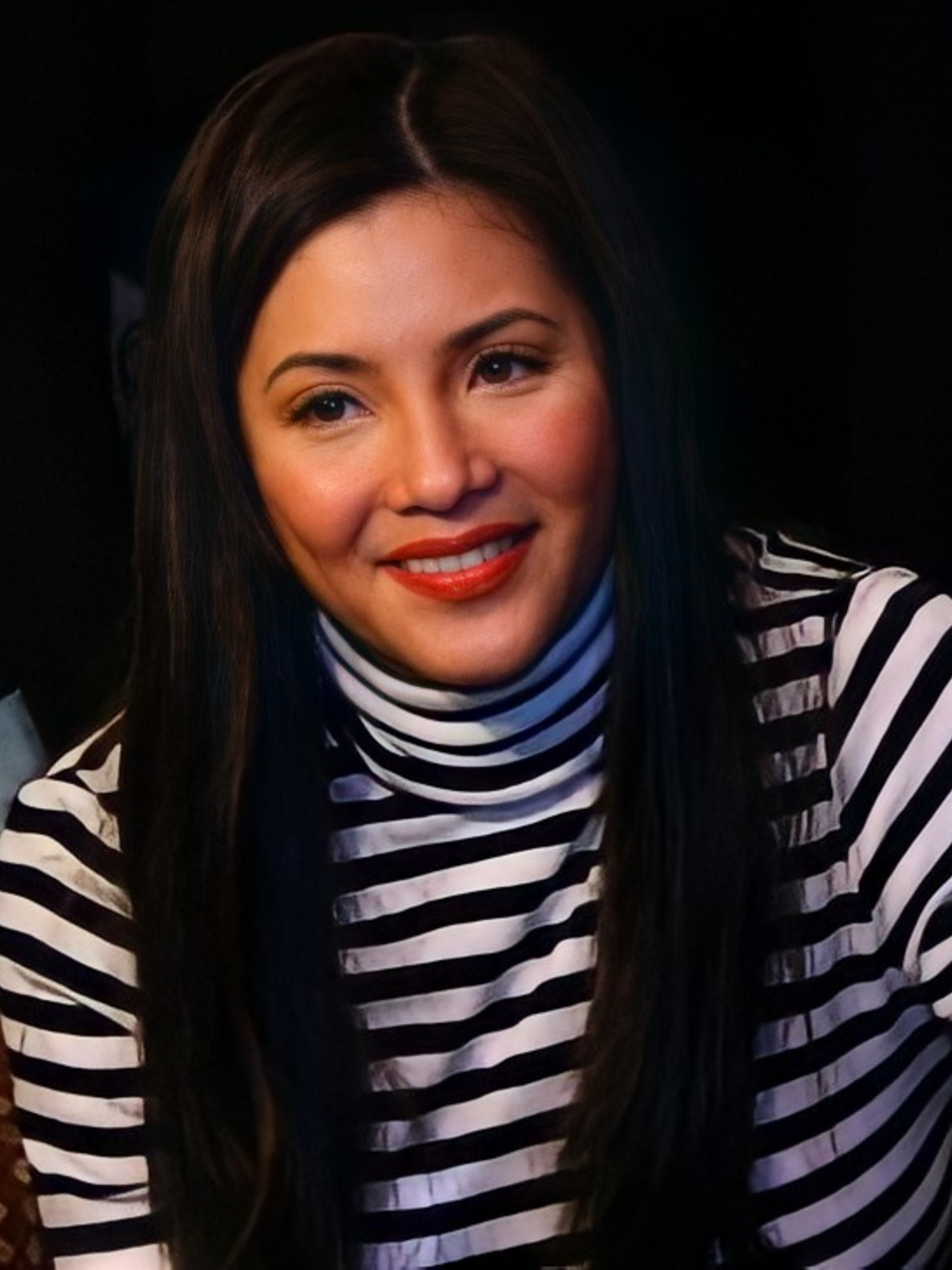
Regine Velasquez-Alcasid

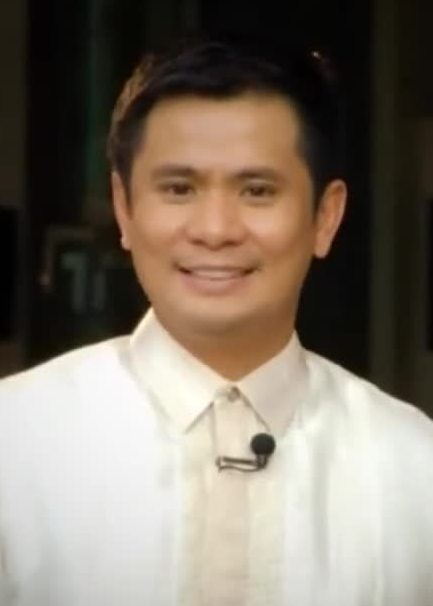
Ogie Alcasid

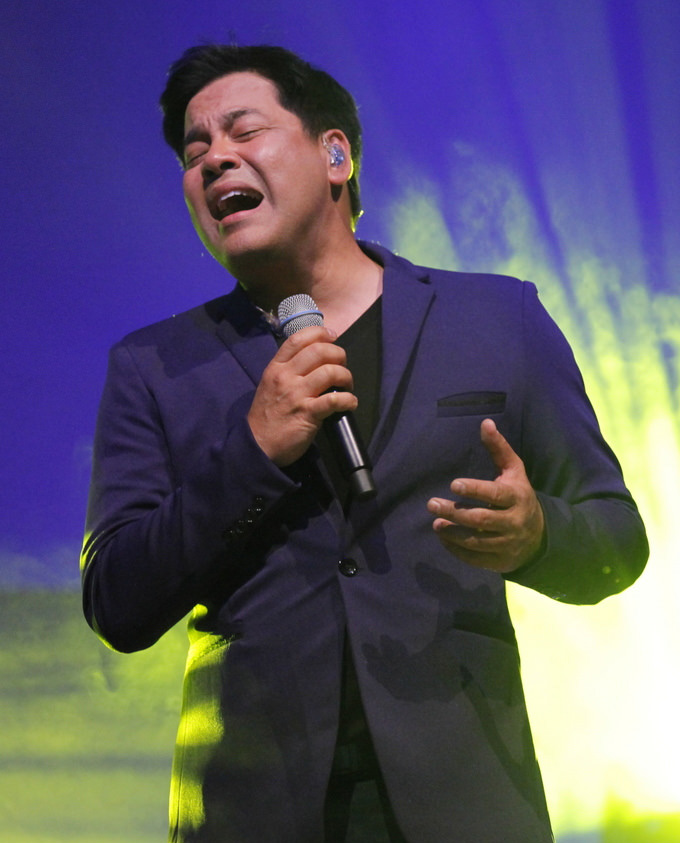
Martin Nievera

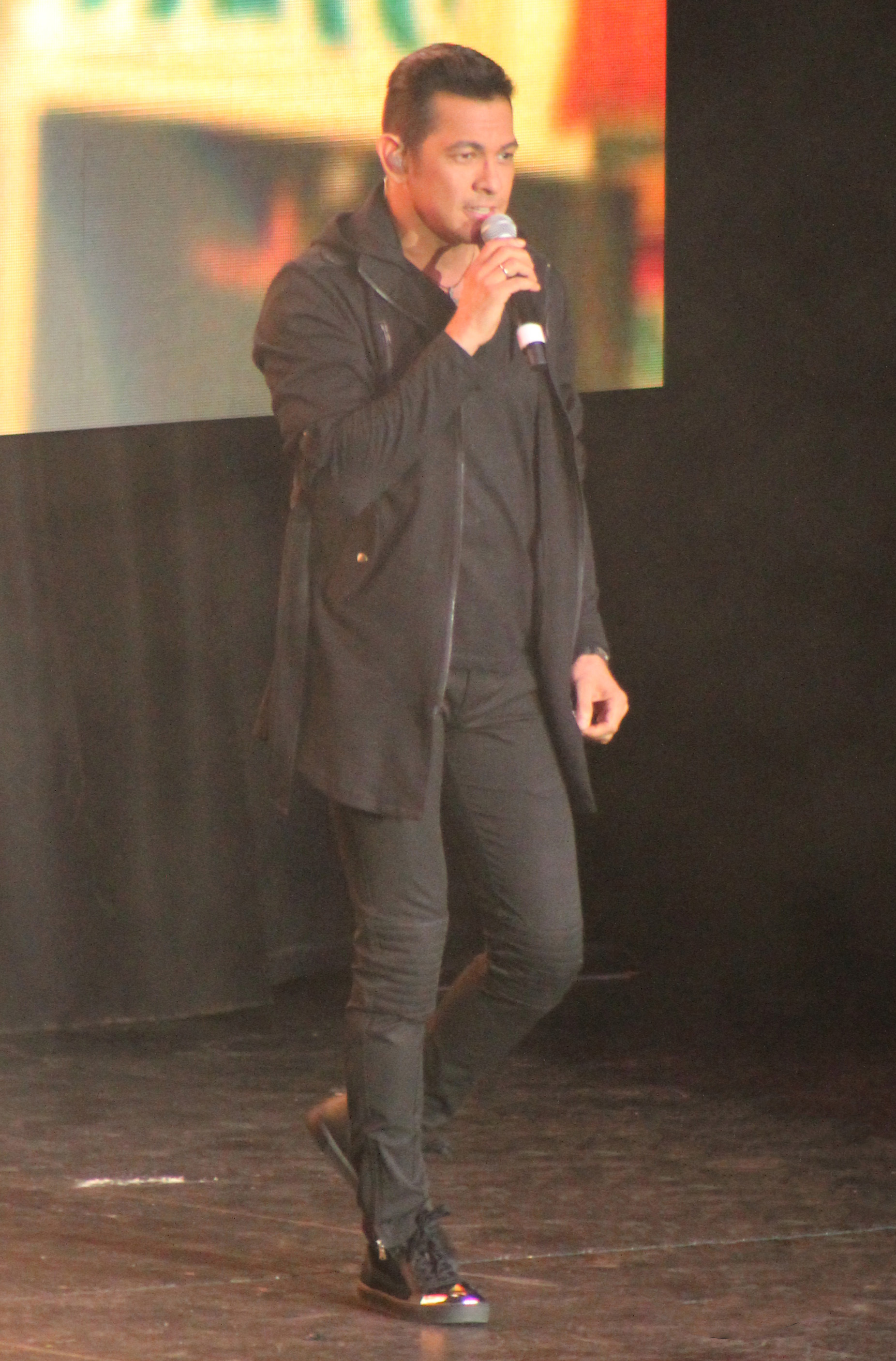
Gary Valenciano

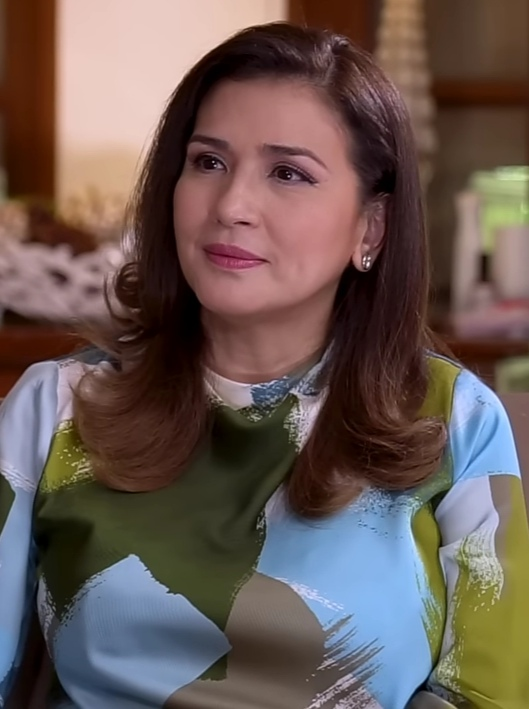
Zsa Zsa Padilla

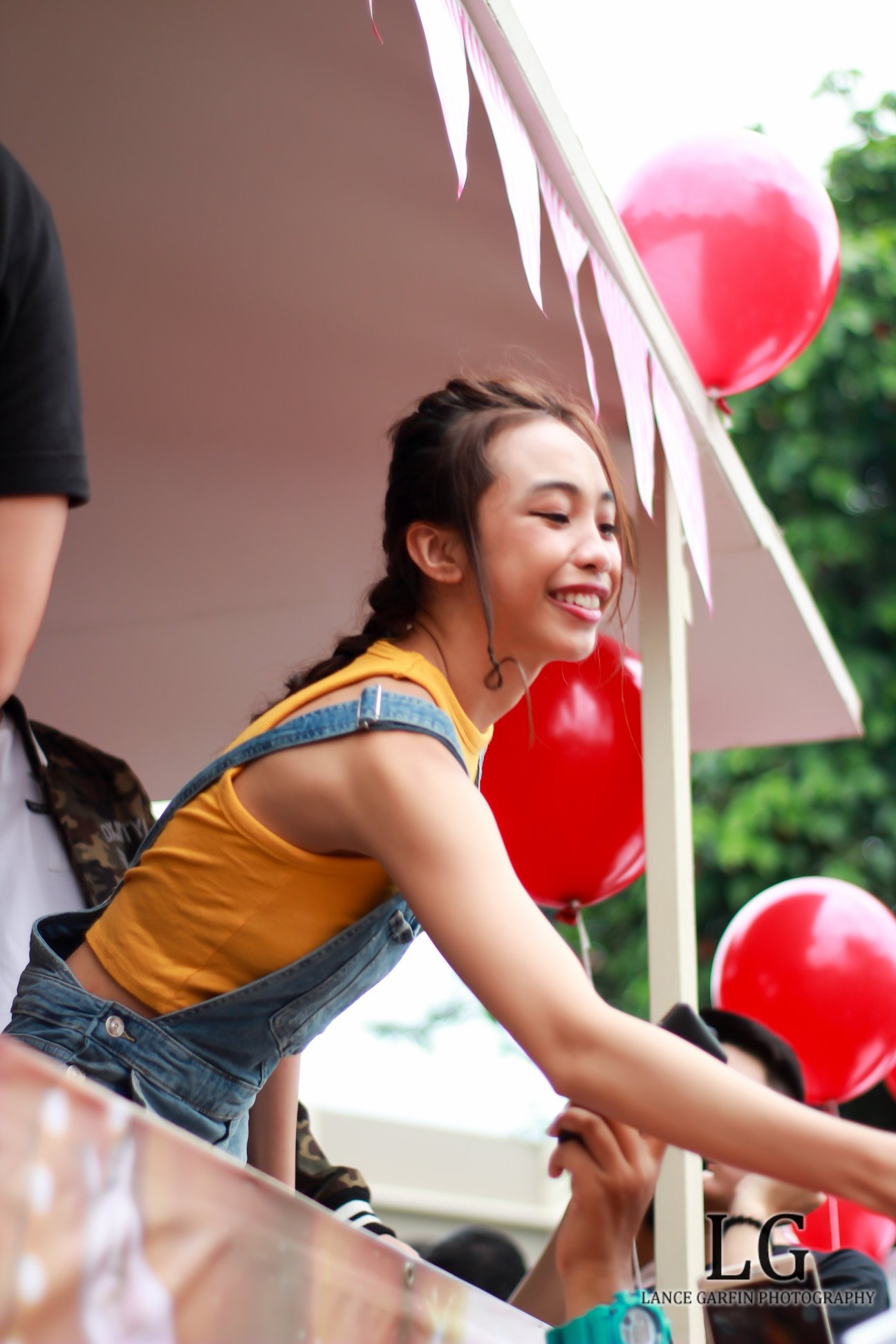
Maymay Entrata

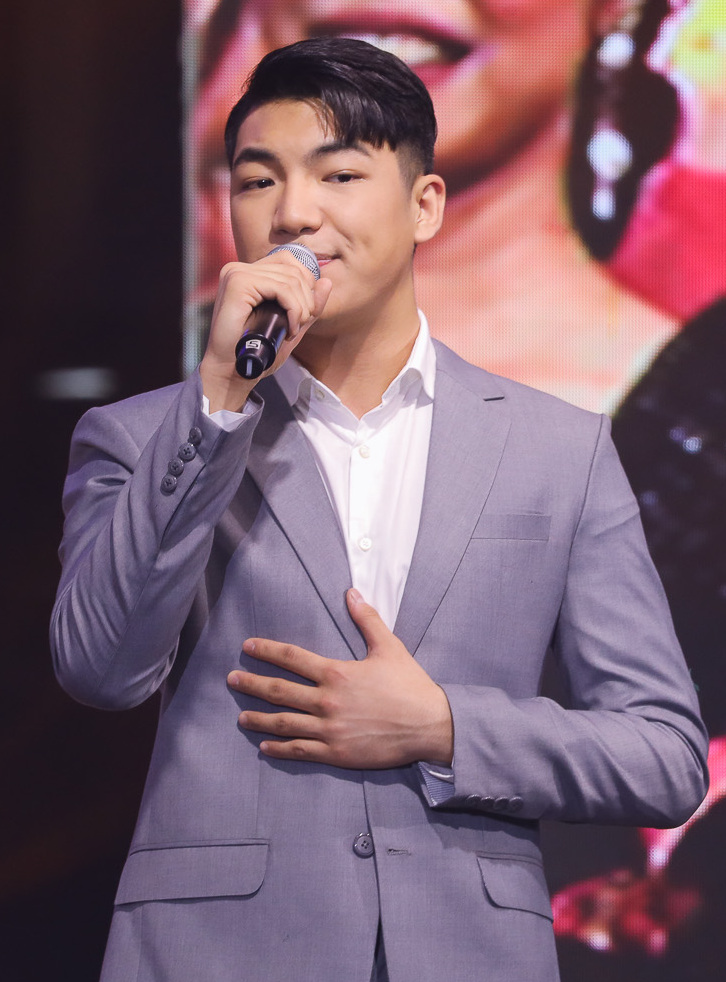
Darren Espanto

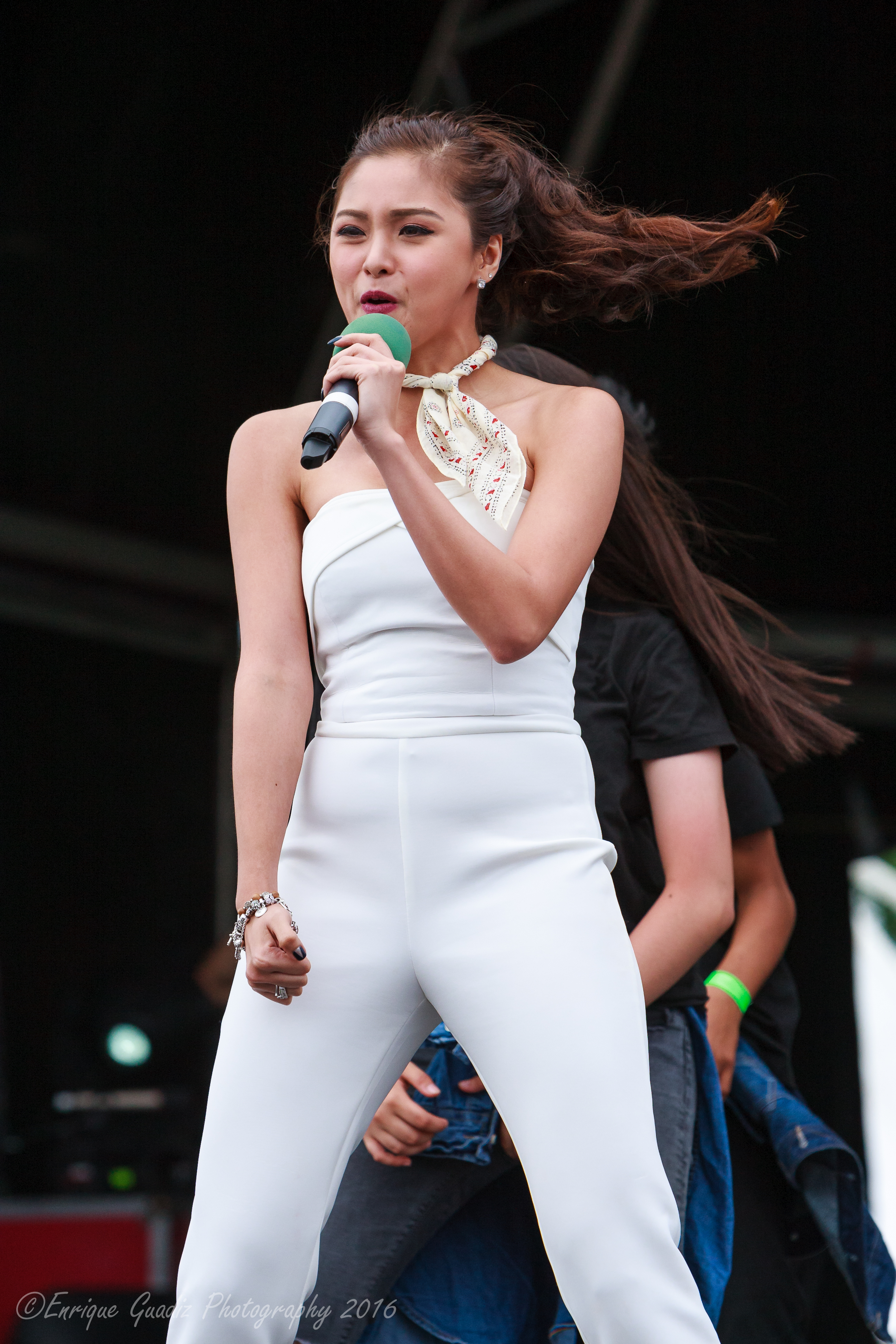
Kim Chiu

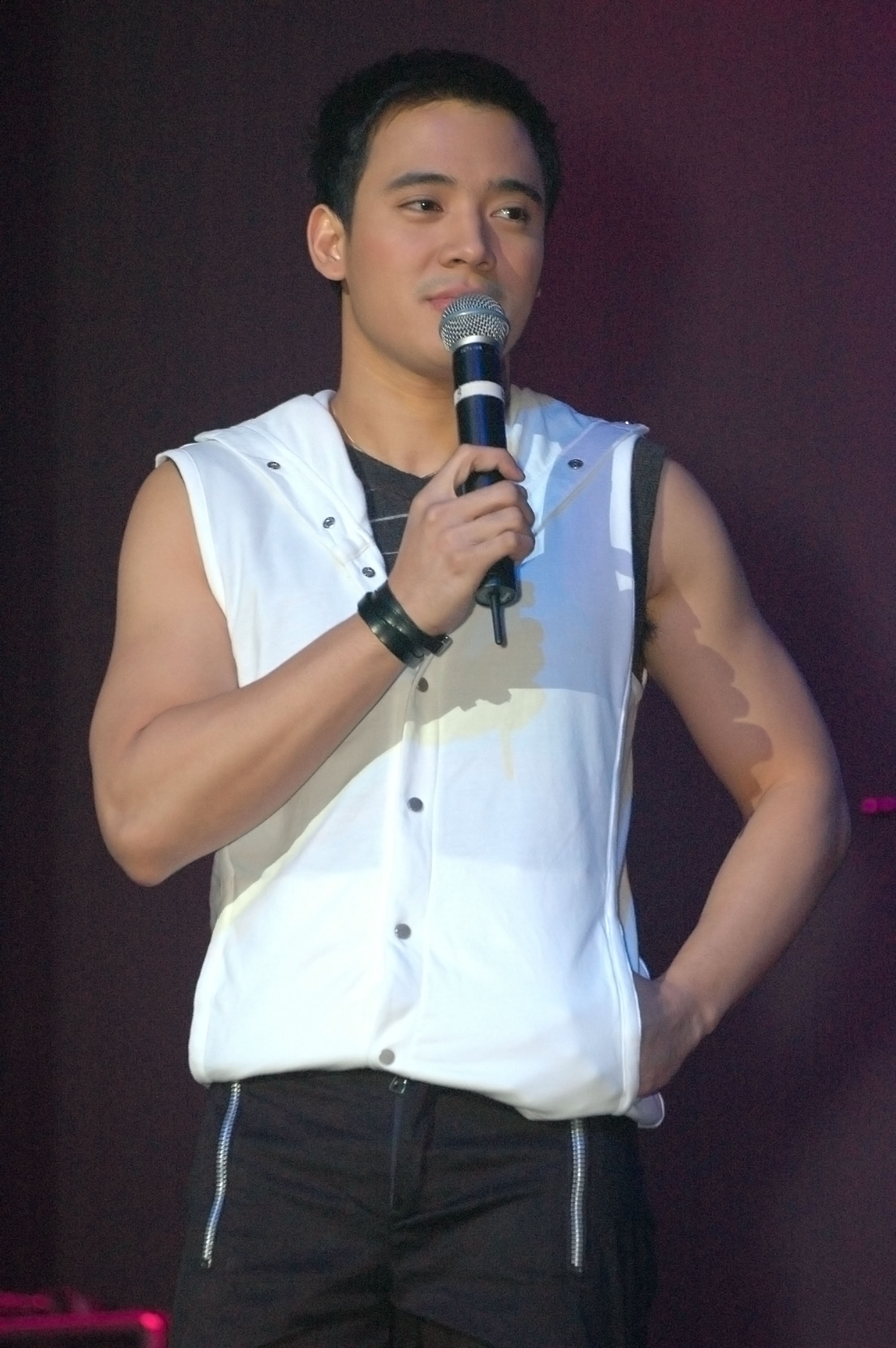
Erik Santos

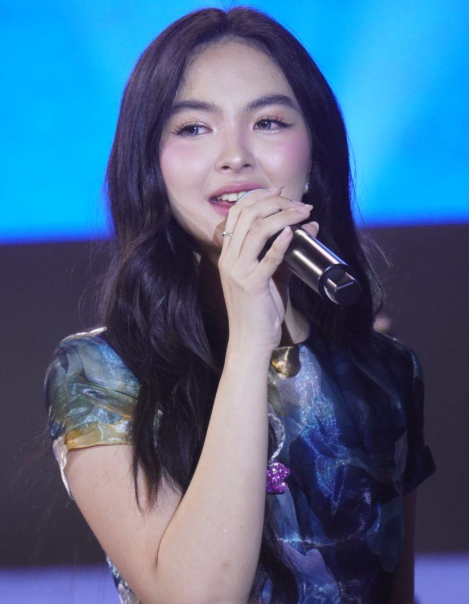
Kai Montinola

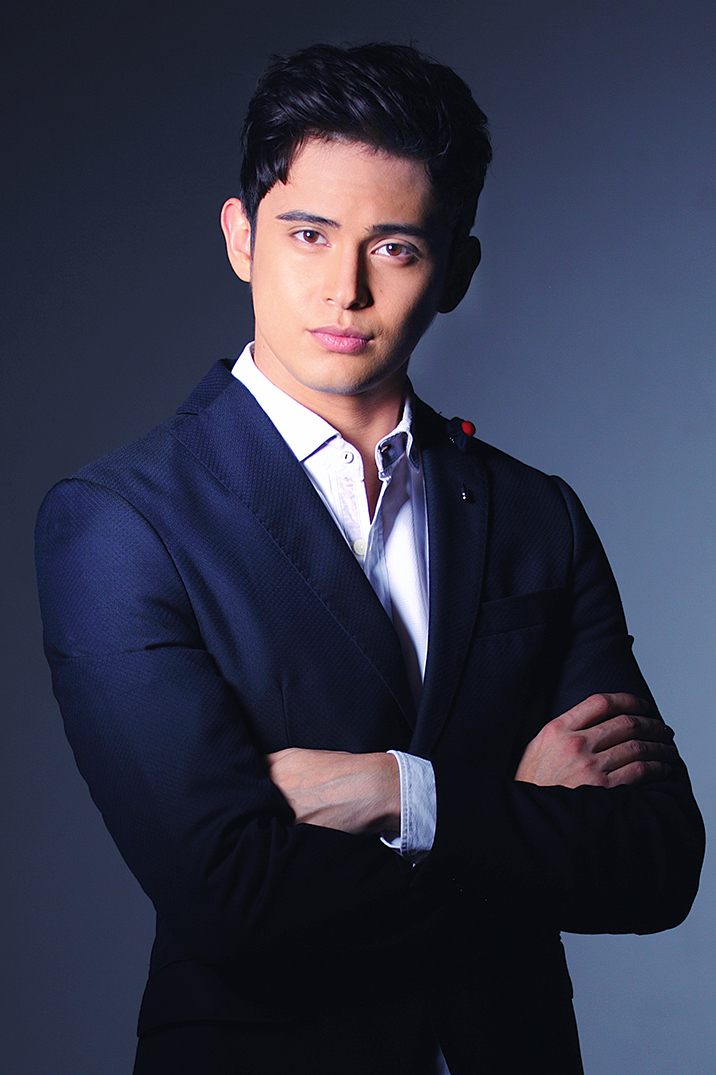
James Reid

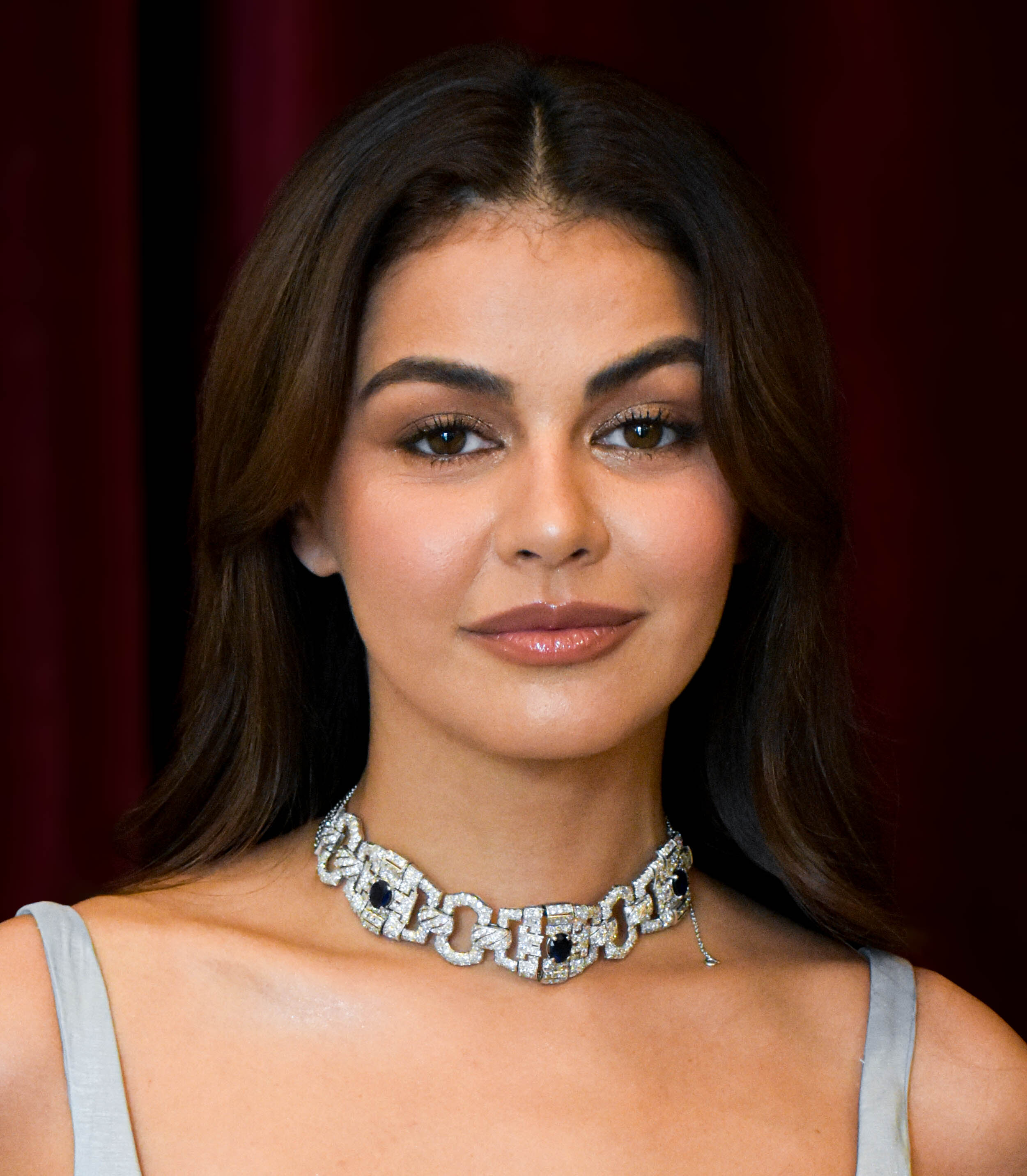
Janine Gutierrez

=== Main hosts ===
- Luis Manzano (since 2003)
- Kim Chiu (since 2006)
- Robi Domingo (since 2008)
- James Reid (2010–2012; since 2014)
- Alexa Ilacad (since 2014)
- Darren Espanto (since 2015)
- Kyle Echarri (since 2016)
- Maymay Entrata (since 2017)
- Donny Pangilinan (2017–2020; since 2021) (Note: Following the franchise denial of ABS-CBN and the retrenchments of employees, this artist had a temporary stint in Sunday Noontime Live! before returning to ASAP.)
- Janine Gutierrez (since 2021)
- Belle Mariano (since 2021)
- Kai Montinola (since 2025)

=== OPM Icons ===
- Martin Nievera (1995–1998; since 2002)
- Zsa Zsa Padilla (since 1998)
- Gary Valenciano (since 2003)
- Sarah Geronimo (since 2004; on hiatus)
- Erik Santos (since 2004)
- Jed Madela (since 2005)
- Yeng Constantino (since 2006)
- Angeline Quinto (since 2011)
- KZ Tandingan (since 2012)
- Ogie Alcasid (since 2017)
- Regine Velasquez-Alcasid (since 2018)

=== Semi-regular/occasional guests ===
- Claudine Barretto (1995–2009; 2015–2022; since 2026)
- Mark Anthony Fernandez (1995–2001; since 2026)
- Jolina Magdangal (1995–2002; since 2014)
- Marvin Agustin (1995–2005; 2014–2017; since 2021)
- Angelica Panganiban (1995–2016; since 2019)
- Carlo Aquino (1995–2005; since 2012)
- Roselle Nava (1995–2003; 2010; since 2015)
- Jamie Rivera (since 1995)
- Judy Ann Santos-Agoncillo (since 1995)
- Aga Muhlach (1995–2010; since 2016)
- Charlene Gonzales (1995–2001; since 2025)
- Carmina Villarroel (1995–2017; since 2026)
- Diether Ocampo (1995–2016; since 2018)
- Maricel Soriano (1995–2003; since 2018)
- Mylene Dizon (1995–2003; since 2021)
- Ariel Rivera (1995–2003; since 2011)
- Pops Fernandez (1995–2003; since 2023)
- Gladys Reyes (1995–2003; since 2026)
- Regine Tolentino (1995–2003; 2017; since 2026)
- Sharon Cuneta (1995–2011; since 2015)
- John Estrada (1995–2018; since 2021)
- Kaye Abad (1995–2018; since 2022)
- Baron Geisler (1995–2005; since 2023)
- Marc Solis (since 1996)
- Vhong Navarro (since 1996)
- Amy Perez (1996–2003; since 2026)
- Piolo Pascual (1996–1998; 2000–2020; since 2021)
- Alwyn Uytingco (1996–2006; since 2025)
- Dimples Romana (1997–2003; since 2010)
- Lea Salonga (since 1997)
- Nikki Valdez (since 1997)
- Jericho Rosales (since 1997)
- Dominic Ochoa (1997–2002; since 2026)
- Maoui David (1998–2006; since 2026)
- Lani Misalucha (1998–2000; 2007–2009; 2012–2016; since 2025)
- Joey de Leon (1998–2004; since 2026)
- Jaya (1998–2000; 2016–2021; since 2024)
- Randy Santiago (since 1998)
- Jodi Sta. Maria (since 1999)
- Desiree del Valle (1999–2005; since 2007) (Note: Freelance artist.)
- Adrian Alandy (1999–2003; 2018–2020; since 2025)
- Ai-Ai delas Alas (2000–2015; since 2026) (Note: Sparkle GMA Artist Center.)
- Vina Morales (since 2001)
- Ryan Agoncillo (2001–2010; since 2026)
- Edu Manzano (2001–2004; since 2023)
- Louise delos Reyes (2001–2003; 2017–2019; since 2026)
- Pauleen Luna (2002–2005; since 2026)
- Rafael Rosell (2002–2012; since 2025)
- Pia Wurtzbach (2002–2006; since 2016)
- Lorna Tolentino (2002–2004; 2008–2011; since 2018)
- Maja Salvador (2003–2020; since 2024)
- Nina (2003–2011; since 2015)
- Madeleine Humphries (since 2003)
- Jhong Hilario (2003–2016; since 2025)
- Anne Curtis (since 2004)
- Shaina Magdayao (2004–2019; since 2022)
- Geoff Eigenmann (2004–2008; since 2019)
- Kitkat (since 2004)
- DJ Durano (2004–2016; since 2026)
- Roxanne Guinoo (2004–2010; since 2015)
- Gab Valenciano (2004–2014; since 2023)
- Erich Gonzales (since 2005)
- Sharlene San Pedro (since 2005)
- Jake Zyrus (since 2005)
- Dino Imperial (2005–2010; since 2023)
- Joem Bascon (2005–2023; since 2025)
- Gerald Anderson (since 2006)
- Sam Milby (since 2006)
- Jake Cuenca (since 2006)
- Sam Concepcion (since 2006)
- Jamilla Obispo (since 2006)
- Zanjoe Marudo (since 2006)
- Rhap Salazar (since 2006)
- Empress Schuck (2006–2014; since 2021)
- Matt Evans (2006–2015; since 2022)
- KC Concepcion (2007–2016; since 2020)
- Bela Padilla (2007–2009; 2015–2019; since 2025)
- Arron Villaflor (2007–2022; since 2025) (Note: Viva Artists Agency)
- Valerie Concepcion (2007–2009; 2011–2016; since 2026)
- Marc Abaya (2007–2011; since 2019)
- Sid Lucero (2007–2010; 2017–2021; since 2026)
- Joel Molina (2007–2024; since 2026)
- Vice Ganda (since 2008)
- Enchong Dee (since 2008)
- Cristine Reyes (since 2008)
- Manuel Chua (2008–2019; since 2024)
- Carmen Soo (since 2008)
- Billy Crawford (2008–2020; since 2026)
- Karylle (2008–2015; since 2026)
- Jessy Mendiola (2008–2019; since 2024)
- Liezel Garcia (since 2008)
- Ejay Falcon (since 2008)
- Richard Poon (since 2008)
- Laarni Lozada (since 2008)
- Bugoy Drilon (since 2008)
- Arnel Pineda (since 2008)
- Jugs Jugueta (since 2009)
- Teddy Corpuz (since 2009)
- Ice Seguerra (since 2009)
- Sitti (since 2009)
- Matteo Guidicelli (2009–2023; since 2026)
- Young JV (2009–2019; since 2022)
- Zaijian Jaranilla (since 2009)
- Coco Martin (since 2009)
- Dionne Monsanto (2009–2021; since 2023)
- Kathryn Bernardo (since 2010)
- Maricar Reyes (since 2010)
- Julia Montes (2010–2018; since 2021)
- Melai Cantiveros (2010–2013; since 2015)
- Ryan Bang (since 2010)
- Enrique Gil (since 2010)
- Neil Coleta (2010–2021; since 2024)
- Xyriel Manabat (since 2011)
- Mutya Orquia (since 2011)
- Zia Quizon (since 2011)
- Juris (since 2011)
- Tippy Dos Santos (since 2011)
- Vic Sotto (2011; since 2026)
- Aiko Melendez (2011–2018; since 2024)
- JM de Guzman (since 2011)
- Alex Castro (since 2011)
- Bryan Termulo (since 2011)
- Marcelito Pomoy (since 2011)
- Daniel Padilla (since 2012)
- James Blanco (2012–2014; 2016–2020; since 2025)
- Iza Calzado (since 2012)
- Paulo Avelino (since 2012)
- Sue Ramirez (since 2012)
- Viveika Ravanes (2012–2020; since 2025)
- Yves Flores (since 2012)
- Karen Reyes (2012–2018; since 2026)
- Kiko Estrada (2012–2014; since 2019)
- Paolo Valenciano (since 2012)
- Alex Medina (since 2012)
- Abra (since 2013)
- apl.de.ap (since 2013)
- Yen Santos (2013–2019; since 2026)
- Anna Luna (2013–2021; since 2025)
- Julia Barretto (since 2013)
- Andrea Brillantes (2013–2025; since 2026)
- Sam Mangubat (2013–2020; since 2021)
- Jane Oineza (2013–2020; since 2021)
- Kean Cipriano (since 2013)
- Mitoy Yonting (since 2013)
- Diego Loyzaga (2013–2018; since 2026)
- Ella Cruz (since 2013)
- JC de Vera (since 2013)
- Coleen Garcia (since 2013)
- Michelle Vito (since 2013) (Note: Star Worx.)
- AJ Muhlach (since 2013)
- Raikko Mateo (since 2013)
- Thor (since 2013)
- Nadine Lustre (since 2014)
- Sofia Andres (since 2014)
- Isabelle Daza (since 2014)
- Paolo Onesa (since 2014)
- Juan Karlos Labajo (since 2014)
- Ebe Dancel (since 2014)
- Nash Aguas (2014–2022; since 2026)
- Ian Veneracion (since 2015)
- Victor Silayan (2015–2022; since 2026)
- Joshua Garcia (since 2015)
- Yassi Pressman (2015–2023; since 2025)
- Jason Fernandez (since 2015)
- Iñigo Pascual (since 2015)
- Elmo Magalona (2015–2020; since 2023)
- Maxene Magalona (since 2015)
- Jay R (since 2015)
- Arci Muñoz (2015–2020; since 2023)
- Miles Ocampo (2015–2021; since 2026)
- Jairus Aquino (since 2015)
- Jana Agoncillo (since 2015)
- Kylie Verzosa (since 2016)
- Rico Blanco (since 2016)
- Karla Estrada (since 2016)
- Xia Vigor (since 2016)
- Kira Balinger (since 2016)
- Ronnie Alonte (since 2016)
- Ryle Santiago (2016–2021; since 2026)
- McCoy de Leon (2016–2021; since 2023)
- Paulo Angeles (2016–2021; since 2024)
- Wilbert Ross (2016–2020; since 2026)
- Marco Gallo (since 2016)
- Elisse Joson (since 2016)
- Tony Labrusca (2016–2024; since 2026)
- Markus Paterson (2016–2024; since 2025)
- Enzo Pineda (since 2016)
- Kristel Fulgar (since 2016)
- Niana Guerrero (2016; since 2021)
- CJ Navato (since 2016)
- Mayton Eugenio (since 2016)
- Danita Paner (since 2016)
- Noel Comia Jr. (since 2017)
- Krissha Viaje (2017–2020; since 2026)
- Alonzo Muhlach (since 2017)
- Edward Barber (since 2017)
- Vivoree Esclito (since 2017)
- Awra Briguela (since 2017)
- Justin Alva (since 2017)
- Sam Shoaf (since 2017)
- Janno Gibbs (since 2017)
- Leila Alcasid (since 2017)
- Kiana Valenciano (since 2017)
- Frankie Pangilinan (since 2017)
- Moira Dela Torre (since 2017)
- Albie Casiño (2017–2019; since 2021)
- Kaye Cal (since 2017)
- Richard Gutierrez (2017–2020; since 2023)
- Aljur Abrenica (2017–2020; since 2026)
- Cindy Miranda (2017–2021; since 2026)
- Rufa Mae Quinto (2017–2021; since 2026)
- Empoy Marquez (2017–2020; since 2026)
- Catriona Gray (2018–2020; since 2021)
- TNT Boys (since 2018)
- Aubrey Caraan (2018; since 2026)
- Carlyn Ocampo (2018; since 2026)
- Janine Teñoso (2018; since 2026)
- Luke Conde (2018–2021; since 2026)
- Nonong Ballinan (since 2018)
- RK Bagatsing (2018–2023; since 2025)
- Gab Lagman (2018–2021; since 2026)
- Barbie Imperial (since 2018)
- Charlie Dizon (since 2018)
- Krystal Brimner (since 2018)
- Francine Diaz (since 2018)
- Janine Berdin (since 2018)
- Seth Fedelin (since 2019)
- TJ Monterde (since 2019)
- Jane De Leon (since 2019)
- Miguel Vergara (since 2019)
- This Band (since 2019)
- Sophia Reola (since 2019)
- SB19 (2019–2020; since 2021)
- Lara Maigue (2019–2020; since 2021)
- Karina Bautista (since 2019)
- Ben&Ben (since 2019)
- I Belong to the Zoo (since 2019)
- Rabiya Mateo (2020–2021; since 2026)
- Lance Carr (since 2020)
- Rhen Escaño (2020–2021; since 2023)
- Sunshine Dizon (since 2021)
- Renshi de Guzman (since 2021)
- Angela Ken (since 2021)
- Adie (since 2021)
- Zack Tabudlo (since 2021)
- Rachel Alejandro (since 2021)
- Agot Isidro (since 2021)
- Kaila Estrada (since 2021)
- Jake Ejercito (since 2021)
- Lovi Poe (since 2021)
- Diego Gutierrez (since 2021)
- Criza Taa (since 2021)
- Aya Fernandez (since 2021)
- Mary Joy Apostol (since 2021)
- Jeremiah Lisbo (since 2021)
- Kaori Oinuma (since 2021)
- Maika Rivera (since 2021)
- Joao Constancia (since 2021)
- Gigi de Lana (since 2021)
- Ian Manibale (since 2021)
- Christian Bables (since 2021)
- Angel Aquino (since 2021)
- Alyanna Angeles (since 2021)
- Elyson de Dios (since 2021)
- Ana Ramsey (2021–2024; since 2026)
- Michael Flores (2021–2023; since 2026)
- Louise Abuel (since 2021)
- Rob Deniel (since 2021)
- Rowell Santiago (since 2022)
- Angelica Lao (since 2022)
- Luis Vera Perez (since 2022)
- Ivana Alawi (since 2022)
- Benedix Ramos (since 2022)
- John Medina (since 2022)
- Gillian Vicencio (since 2022)
- Andi Abaya (since 2022)
- Arabella Davao (since 2022)
- Jay Gonzaga (since 2022)
- Mark Manicad (2022–2025; since 2026)
- Simon Ibarra (2022–2024; since 2025)
- Shanaia Gomez (since 2022)
- Sam Coloso (2022–2023; since 2026)
- Katrina Velarde (since 2023)
- Bea Binene (2023–2025; since 2026)
- Krystal Mejes (since 2023)
- Jennica Garcia (since 2023)
- Jackie Gonzaga (since 2023)
- John Arcilla (since 2023)
- Jef Gaitan (since 2023)
- Jex de Castro (since 2023)
- Jerald Napoles (2023–2024; since 2025)
- Pepe Herrera (since 2023)
- Lorraine Galvez (since 2023)
- Ion Perez (since 2023)
- Rans Rifol (since 2023)
- Kim Rodriguez (since 2023)
- Raven Rigor (since 2023)
- Sean Tristan (since 2023)
- Michelle Dee (since 2023)
- Anthony Jennings (since 2023)
- JC Alcantara (since 2023)
- Baby Dolls (2023; since 2026)
- Leo Consul (2023; since 2026)
- Lassy Marquez (since 2024)
- Daniela Stranner (since 2024)
- Miggy Jimenez (since 2024)
- Kim Domingo (since 2024)
- Jas Dudley-Scales (since 2024)
- Ronwaldo Martin (since 2024)
- Cedrick Juan (2024; since 2026)
- Ryan Martin (since 2024)
- Race Matias (since 2024)
- Argus Aspiras (since 2024)
- Harvey Bautista (since 2024)
- Iana Bernardez (since 2024)
- Elijah Canlas (since 2024)
- Adrian Lindayag (since 2024)
- Ralph de Leon (since 2024)
- River Joseph (since 2024)
- Brent Manalo (since 2024)
- Will Ashley (since 2025)
- Esnyr (since 2025)
- Lucas Andalio (since 2025)
- Joaquin Arce (since 2025)
- Eric Fructuoso (since 2025)
- Antonio Aquitania (since 2025)
- Zia Grace Bataan (since 2025)
- Zach Guerrero (since 2025)
- Rea Gen Villareal (since 2025)
- Miah Tiangco (since 2025)
- Mark Justo (since 2025)
- Eich Abando (since 2025)
- MC "Muah" Calaquian (since 2026)
- Cianne Dominguez (since 2026)
- Lella Ford (since 2026)
- Rave Victoria (since 2026)
- Eliza Borromeo (since 2026)
- Reich Alim (since 2026)
- Iñigo Jose (since 2026)
- Fred Moser (since 2026)
- Rita Daniela (since 2026)
- Jessica Sanchez (since 2026)
- Rochelle Pangilinan (since 2026)
- Zach Castañeda (since 2026)
- Angelina Cruz (since 2026)
- Reign Parani (since 2026)
- Lou Yanong (since 2026)
- Ashtine Olviga (since 2026)
- Christopher Diwata (since 2026)
- Zabel Lamberth (since 2026)
- Rocky Labayen (since 2026)
- Tristan Ramirez (since 2026)
- Ashton Salvador (since 2026)
- Angela Muji (since 2026)
- Rabin Angeles (since 2026)
- Andres Muhlach (since 2026)
- Atasha Muhlach (since 2026)
- Carren Eistrup (since 2026)
- Allan K. (since 2026)
- Maine Mendoza (since 2026)
- Ryzza Mae Dizon (since 2026)
- Jose Manalo (since 2026)
- Wally Bayola (since 2026)
- Paolo Ballesteros (since 2026)
- Singing Queens (since 2026)
- Amber Torres (since 2026)
- Tito Sotto (since 2026)
- Inday Fatima (since 2026)
- Pearl Gonzales (since 2026)
- Selina Griffin (since 2026)
- Nico Matugas (since 2026)
- Celyn David (since 2026)
- Rahil Gatali (since 2026)
- Ryrie Sophia (since 2026)
- Gianna Huelgas (since 2026)
- Marthena Jickain (since 2026)
- Keisha Serna (since 2026)
- Kaitlyn King (since 2026)
- Stephanie Razon (since 2026)
- Nathalie Apollo (since 2026)
- Queenay Mercado (since 2026)
- Mark Ian (since 2026)
- Spencer Capistrano (since 2026)
- Adam Buck (since 2026)
- Patrick Ballesteros (since 2026)
- Chan Martin (since 2026)
- Amo Wilding (since 2026)
- Dom Corilla (since 2026)
- Kenneth Aniban (since 2026)
- Kenneth Stromness (since 2026)
- Kenneth Mendoza (since 2026)
- Marc Jai (since 2026)
- Maxie Andreison (since 2026)
- Gab Yabut (since 2026)
- Alyanna Regina (since 2026)
- Seiya Marasigan (since 2026)
- Coreen del Rosario (since 2026)
- Coreen Lozano (since 2026)
- Felize Rosales (since 2026)
- Ice Reyes (since 2026)
- Kurt Deseo (since 2026)
- Kurt Hendrix Vilbar (since 2026)
- Kych Mimemoto (since 2026)
- Wayne Leonard (since 2026)
- Achilles Ador (since 2026)
- Zion Cruz (since 2026)
- Allyson McBride (since 2026)
- Sophia Senoron (since 2026)
- Hyacinth Callado (since 2026)
- Hiro Magalona (since 2026)
- Lance Lucido (since 2026)
- Pancho Magno (since 2026)
- Amiel Sol (since 2026)

=== Current regular/semi-regular performers ===
- Bituin Escalante (since 2003)
- Sheryn Regis (2004–2010; since 2014)
- Nyoy Volante (since 2009)
- Bamboo (since 2011)
- Morissette (since 2013)
- Klarisse de Guzman (since 2013)
- Janella Salvador (since 2013)
- Lyca Gairanod (since 2014)
- Bryce Eusebio (2014–2016; since 2026)
- Jason Dy (since 2015)
- Kyla (since 2015)
- Elha Nympha (since 2015)
- Esang de Torres (since 2015)
- Loisa Andalio (since 2015)
- Maris Racal (2015–2020; since 2021)
- Marlo Mortel (2015–2025; since 2026)
- Jona (since 2016)
- Chie Filomeno (since 2016)
- Jeremy Glinoga (since 2017)
- AC Bonifacio (since 2017)
- Jayda (2018–2020; 2021–2023; since 2026)
- Ken San Jose (since 2019)
- Bini (since 2020)
- BGYO (since 2020)
- Jameson Blake (since 2020)
- JM Yosures (since 2021)
- Anji Salvacion (since 2021)
- KD Estrada (since 2021)
- Reiven Umali (since 2021)
- JM Dela Cerna (since 2022)
- Bryan Chong (since 2022)
- Khimo Gumatay (since 2022)
- LA Santos (since 2023)
- Lyka Estrella (since 2023)
- Marko Rudio (since 2023)
- Marielle Montellano (since 2023)
- Gela Atayde (since 2023)
- Maki (since 2024)
- Jarren Garcia (since 2024)
- Emilio Daez (since 2024)
- JM Ibarra (since 2024)
- Fyang Smith (since 2024)
- Kolette Madelo (since 2025)
- Rain Celmar (since 2025)
- Dustin Yu (since 2025)
- Bianca de Vera (since 2025)
- Robbie Jaworski (since 2025)
- Sofronio Vasquez (since 2025)
- Carmelle Collado (since 2025)
- Ice Almeria (since 2026)
- Gerald Santos (since 2026)
- Ace Carrera (since 2026)
- Binsoy Namoca (since 2026)
- Michelle Garcia (since 2026)
- Christian Tibayan (since 2026)
- Arvery Love Lagoring (since 2026)
- Althea Ablan (since 2026)
- Carmela Lorzano (since 2026)
- Marimar Tua (since 2026)
- Kit Inciong (since 2026)
- Dylan Menor (since 2026)
- Jarlo Bâse (since 2026)
- Michael Grau (since 2026)
- Josh Worsley (since 2026)

==== Current Live Band ====
- Six Part Invention (since 2019)

== Release ==
For most of its broadcast history ASAP was broadcast on ABS-CBN, from its premiere in 1995 to 2020. Following the shutdown of ABS-CBN due to its franchise non-renewal on July 10, 2020, ASAP moved to ABS-CBN Corporation's pay television network Kapamilya Channel, with simulcasts of the variety show available on Jeepney TV. In October 2020, the show made its free TV return on A2Z. From January 24, 2021, until December 28, 2025, and again since October 18, 2026, ASAP started its simulcasts on TV5, replacing Brightlight Productions shows such as Sunday Noontime Live!, I Got You, and Sunday 'Kada. Additionally, since January 4, 2026, the show simulcasts was later expanded into ALLTV, thus marking the show returned to former main ABS-CBN's terrestrial television network channel frequencies as well as discontinuing the ASAP Natin 'To name and logo after 7 years.

=== Ratings ===
ASAP was consistently the leading Sunday noontime show on Philippine television from 1995 until it was rated number 2 in 2002, when SOP took over the number one spot. It was ranked number one throughout 2003 and 2004, but went back to number 2 when GMA became the leading network in Mega Manila. ASAP once again became the ratings leader from 2007 until early 2020; the ratings leadership became more intense in 2009, which caused the reformatting of SOP in November of that year.

ASAP temporarily ceased airing live shows in 2020 due to the COVID-19 pandemic and the shutdown of its home network on free-to-air-television, ABS-CBN. When it returned on Free TV in October 2020 and eventual return to former main ABS-CBN television service channel frequencies in January 2026, the program was losing in ratings to All-Out Sundays, a current rival program on GMA hosted by Alden Richards, Julie Anne San Jose, and former ASAP mainstays Christian Bautista, Mark Bautista, Bea Alonzo, and Rayver Cruz.

== Licensing and merchandise ==
=== ASAP Music ===
ASAP Music is the record label of ASAP, distributed by Star Music. The label has released a tribute compilation album to OPM classic pop-rock band Hotdog. It has also released soundtracks of ABS-CBN TV series Sana Maulit Muli, My Girl, and Your Song presents: My Only Hope, all of which starred Kim Chiu and Gerald Anderson. It has also released dance compilations for the defunct segment "Ultimate Dance 4" and the current segment "Supah Dance Plus". All contain original remixes and dance songs.

=== ASAP Pop Viewers' Choice Awards ===
ASAP Pop Viewers' Choice Awards is an annual award show that is held on a Sunday afternoon during a ASAP variety show at the end of every year, usually in November or December. It honors the year's biggest television, movie, and music acts, as voted by Kapamilya fans. In November 2015, the ASAP Pop Viewers' Choice Awards was changed to ASAP Pop Teen Choice Awards.

=== Others ===
- ASAP Lifestyle – ASAP's clothing line, available through BUM boutiques in the Philippines.
- ASAP Bookazine – ASAP's book-magazine, and the first ever book-magazine released by a Philippine TV show.
- ASAP Online – ASAP's official website, where viewers, fans and supporters can view information about the show, read fun facts about the cast, get an update on the events and lifestyle, view photos and videos on-set, send their requests to artists, and even chat with them.
- ASAP Remix – A "throwback" spin-off musical variety show aired on Jeepney TV every Sunday from 12:00 AM to 1:30 AM, just hours before the latest ASAP XP episodes will air on the Kapamilya Channel, A2Z, All TV, and TV5. It features selected memorable production numbers featuring the entire ASAP cast with special guests from more than the past 30 years.
- ASAP XP Replay – A replay of the show's episode is aired on Metro Channel every Sunday from 9:00 PM to 11:00 PM and on Jeepney TV from 10:00 PM to 12:00 MN.

== Studios used by ASAP ==
- Delta Theatre (February 5, 1995 – early 1997)
- ABS-CBN Studio 3 (March 1997 – 2004)
- ABS-CBN Studio 10 (2004 – 2026)

== Tours ==
Since 1996, ASAP has held at least one show every year outside the studio (except years when the COVID-19 pandemic prevailed). Since 2014, the international shows are held in the middle–late part of the year, and a taped episode is aired the week of the concert. Then the international concert is aired in the following two to four weeks, divided into two to four parts.

=== Shows ===
Show date	Broadcast date	City	Country	Venue
1990s
February 9, 1997		Quezon City	Philippines	Araneta Coliseum
October 18, 1998		Makati	Philippines	Unknown
February 7, 1999		Pasay; Bacolod	Philippines	Cuneta Astrodome; University of St. La Salle Coliseum
2000s
January 23, 2000		Makati City	Philippines	Park Square 2
February 10, 2002		Quezon City	Philippines	Araneta Coliseum
August 11, 2002		Cebu	Philippines	Unknown
February 9, 2003		Quezon City	Philippines	Araneta Coliseum
February 15, 2004		Makati	Philippines	Unknown
April 4, 2004		Daly City	United States	Cow Palace
October 10, 2004		Manila	Philippines	Folk Arts Theater
October 10, 2004		Pasig	Philippines	PhilSports Arena
May 1, 2005		Cebu	Philippines	Ayala Center Cebu
July 16, 2005	July 17, 2005	Pasadena	United States	Rose Bowl
July 24, 2005		San Francisco	United States	Monster Park Fairgrounds
September 30, 2005	October 2, 2005	Tokyo	Japan	Studio Coast
August 20, 2006		Davao City	Philippines	Unknown
March 25, 2007		Subic	Philippines	Subic Bay Boardwalk
April 1, 2007	April 15, 2007	Manila	Philippines	Island Cove
April 22, 2007		Mindanao	Philippines	Unknown
October 11, 2008	October 19, 2008	Guam		University of Guam Field House
January 18, 2009	January 25, 2009	Mabalacat	Philippines	Xevera Grounds
2010s
March 21, 2010	March 21, 2010; March 28, 2010	Boracay	Philippines	Fairways and Bluewater New Coast
November 28, 2010		Baguio	Philippines	Melvin Jones Grandstand
January 23, 2011		Iloilo City	Philippines	Iloilo Sports Complex
February 27, 2011		Davao City	Philippines	Davao Crocodile Park
March 27, 2011		Cebu	Philippines	Sugbo Grounds, South Road Properties
January 22, 2012		Manila	Philippines	Quirino Grandstand
October 14, 2012	October 21, 2012; October 28, 2012	Singapore		Max Pavilion, Singapore Expo
January 27, 2013		Iloilo City	Philippines	Iloilo Sports Complex
October 6, 2013		Marikina	Philippines	Marikina Sports Center
January 24, 2014	February 2, 2014; February 9, 2014	Dubai	United Arab Emirates	Dubai Festival City
October 11, 2014	October 19, 2014; October 26, 2014	Los Angeles	United States	Los Angeles Memorial Sports Arena
February 22, 2015 (Note: The show was part of ASAP's 20th anniversary.)	February 22, 2015; March 1, 2015	Pasay	Philippines	SM Mall of Asia Arena
September 6, 2015	September 13, 2015; September 20, 2015	London	England	Wembley Arena
October 4, 2015		Biñan	Philippines	Alonte Sports Arena
July 3, 2016 (Note: The show was part of the launching of the "ASAPinoy" segment.)		Pasay	Philippines	Newport Performing Arts Theater
September 3, 2016	September 11, 2016; September 18, 2016	Brooklyn	United States	Barclays Center
May 21, 2017 (Note: The show was part of Star Magic's 25th anniversary.)	May 21, 2017 (live); May 28, 2017 (taped)	Quezon City	Philippines	Araneta Coliseum
July 29, 2017	August 6, 2017; August 13, 2017	Toronto	Canada	Ricoh Coliseum
June 30, 2018	July 8, 2018; July 22, 2018 (Note: The second part was aired a week later due to the network's simulcast of the Manny Pacquiao vs. Lucas Matthysse fight on the previous week)	Honolulu	United States	Neal S. Blaisdell Arena
October 20, 2018	October 28, 2018; November 4, 2018	Sydney	Australia	ICC Sydney Theatre
August 3, 2019	August 11, 2019; August 18, 2019	San Jose (Note: Promoted as San Francisco Bay Area)	United States	SAP Center at San Jose
November 16, 2019	November 24, 2019; December 1, 2019	Rome	Italy	Palazzo dello Sport
2020s
November 5, 2022	November 13, 2022; November 20, 2022	Las Vegas	United States	Orleans Arena
September 10, 2023	September 17, 2023; September 24, 2023	Milan	Italy	Mediolanum Forum
August 3, 2024	August 11, 2024; August 18, 2024	Ontario	United States	Toyota Arena
August 30, 2025	September 7, 2025; September 14, 2025	Solihull	England	bp pulse LIVE
October 18, 2025	October 26, 2025; November 2, 2025; November 9, 2025; November 23, 2025 (Note: Originally scheduled to air on November 16, 2025, was postponed a week later due to the Tulong-Tulong Kapamilya: A Benefit Concert in light of the impacts of Typhoon Kalmaegi (Tino) and Typhoon Fung-wong (Uwan) in the preceding weeks)	Vancouver	Canada	Pacific Coliseum
May 10, 2026	May 17, 2026; May 24, 2026; May 31, 2026; June 7, 2026; June 14, 2026	Quezon City	Philippines	Araneta Coliseum
June 7, 2026	June 21, 2026; June 28, 2026; July 5, 2026; July 12, 2026; July 19, 2026	Victorias	Philippines	Victorias City Coliseum; Victorias City, Negros Occidental
July 25, 2026	August 2, 2026; August 9, 2026; August 16, 2026; August 23, 2026; August 30, 2026	Sydney	Australia	TikTok Entertainment Centre (formerly known as ICC Sydney Theatre)
October 11, 2026	October 18, 2026; October 25, 2026; November 1, 2026; November 8, 2026; November 15, 2026	Angeles City	Philippines	Lapid Arena
November 15, 2026	November 22, 2026; November 29, 2026; December 13, 2026; December 20, 2026; December 27, 2026	Isabela	Philippines	Santiago Sports Arena
February 21, 2027	February 28, 2027; March 7, 2027; March 14, 2027; March 21, 2027; March 28, 2027	Santa Rosa	Philippines	Santa Rosa Sports Complex

=== Cancelled shows ===
Date	City	Country	Venue	Reason
2020s
February 2022	Dubai	United Arab Emirates	Expo 2020	Surge of COVID-19 cases in the Philippines caused by the Omicron variant

== Accolades ==
Accolades received by ASAP
Year	Award	Category	Recipient	Result	Ref.
2010	GMMSF Box-Office Entertainment Awards	Dance Group of the Year	ASAP Supahdance	Won	
2012	GMMSF Box-Office Entertainment Awards	Most Promising Recording/Performing Group	ASAP Boys R Boys	Won	
2015	PMPC Star Awards for Television	Best Musical Variety Show	ASAP	Won	
2018	PMPC Star Awards for Television	Best Musical Variety Show Hall of Fame	ASAP	Won	

== See also ==
- List of programs broadcast by ABS-CBN
- List of programs broadcast by Studio 23
- List of programs broadcast by Jeepney TV
- List of Kapamilya Channel original programming
- List of programs broadcast by Metro Channel
- List of Kapamilya Online Live original programming
- List of A2Z original programming
- List of TV5 (Philippine TV network) original programming
- List of All TV original programming
- ABS-CBN
- Studio 23
- Jeepney TV
- Kapamilya Channel
- Metro Channel
- Kapamilya Online Live
- A2Z
- TV5
- All TV
- Star Magic
- Wowowee (ASAP's and It's Showtime's former sister program)
- Pilipinas Win Na Win and Happy Yipee Yehey! (ASAP's and It's Showtime's former short-lived sister programs)
- It's Showtime (ASAP's current, and Wowowee's, Pilipinas Win Na Win's and Happy Yipee Yehey!'s former sister program)
- Eat Bulaga! (ABS-CBN's and GMA's former and TV5's current daily noontime program)
- All-Out Sundays (ASAP's current rival program on the noontime slot aired on GMA Network, GTV, Heart of Asia Channel, I Heart Movies, and Pinoy Hits)
- Family Feud (ABC's former primetime, ABS-CBN's former weekend, and GMA Network's current pre-primetime program)
