= Ang Mutya ng Section E =

Philippine teen romantic comedy television series

- Season 1 release poster
- Also known as: The Muse of Section E
- Genre: Romantic comedy; Teen drama; Coming-of-age
- Based on: Ang Mutya ng Section E by Lara Flores
- Written by: Juvy Galamiton; Anjanette Haw; Kim Noromor
- Directed by: Theodore Boborol (Season 1); Petersen Vargas (Season 2)
- Starring: Ashtine Olviga; Andres Muhlach; Rabin Angeles
- Opening theme: "Daleng Dale" by MMJ (Season 1, Episode 1-6) "Daleng Dale" by GAT (Season 1, Episode 7-15) "Happy Ending" by Rob Deniel (Special Opening Theme for Season 1 Finale) "Kembot" by GAT (Season 2)
- Ending theme: "Daleng Dale" by MMJ (Season 1, Episode 1-2) "Sa Bawat Sandali" by Amiel Sol (Season 1, Episode 3-9) "Sa Bawat Sandali" by Ashtine Olviga (Season 1, Episode 10-16)
- Country of origin: Philippines
- Original language: Filipino
- No. of seasons: 2
- No. of episodes: 25

Production
- Running time: 52–71 minutes
- Production companies: Studio Viva; Wattpad Webtoon Studios

Original release
- Network: Viva One
- Release: January 3, 2025 – present

Ang Mutya ng Section E (transl. The Jewel of Section E) is a Philippine teen romantic comedy television series. It is based on the Wattpad books by Lara Flores, also known by her pseudonym Eatmore2behappy. Ashtine Olviga, Andres Muhlach and Rabin Angeles play lead roles. It premiered on Viva One on January 3, 2025. The second season releases in two parts, with part 1 premiered on December 5, 2025, and the second on August 31, 2026.

== Background and release ==
The series is based on the Wattpad books by Lara Flores, also known by her pseudonym Eatmore2behappy. The trilogy had reportedly amassed a total of 348 million reads as of December 2024. The cast was first revealed at a press conference in November 2024 at the Viva Café, with Ashtine Olviga, Andres Muhlach, and Rabin Angeles playing lead roles.

New-generation actors Andre Yllana, Charles Law, Frost Sandoval, Keagan De Jesus, Ethan David, Kurt Delos Reyes, Martin Venegas, Nic Galvez, Daniel Ong, AJ Ferrer, Sam Shoaf, Michael Keith, Kyosu Guinto, Yanyan De Jesus, Derick Ong, and Heart Ryan were also announced as cast members in November, alongside senior actors Yayo Aguila, Katya Santos, Nanette Inventor, and Lander Vera-Perez. The director, Theodore Boborol, promised fans of the books that Mutya would remain faithful to the source material. Flores, the author, affirmed Boborol's promise, revealing that the production secured her consent before making any significant changes to the story. On December 19, 2024, the series' official trailer premiered at another press conference. The trailer garnered more than two million views in fewer than 24 hours, which surged to seven million by December 21.

The first season aired on January 3, 2025, with 16 episodes. The series is a collaboration between Viva One and Wattpad Webtoon Studios. The series was also aired on TV5's short-lived Primetime Primera (originally intended to be included on TodoMax Primetime Singko) programming block from May 19 to July 18, 2025.

On August 4, the trailer for the second season premiered in front of the live audience at Vivakarda: the Ultimate Fancon and Grand Concert. It was later posted on X. The trailer revealed the new cast members who would be joining the original one: Joko Diaz as Kaizer Watson, Keifer's father; Nathalie Hart as Keifer's mother Serina Watson; Taneo Sebastian as Yuri's rival Ryosuke Sato; Billy Villeta as Dylan; Austin Dizon as Jason; Jeffrey Hidalgo as Andy Estrada; and Rhen Escaño as Honey Bee Ryder. The first episode of the season is scheduled to premiere on December 5 2025.

== Cast and characters ==
Main cast

- Ashtine Olviga as Jasper Jean "Jay-jay" Fernandez Mariano
- Andres Muhlach as Mark Keifer Watson
- Rabin Angeles as Yuri Hanamichi
- Charles Law as Cinco Neith "Ci-N" Peralta
- Kurt Delos Reyes as John Felix Collins
- Frost Sandoval as David Theodore Braselton
- Ethan David as Calix Reinier Rivera
- Sam Shoaf as Edrix Knight Peňaflor
- Keagan De Jesus as Superman "Eman" Andrada
- André Yllana as Michael Aries Fernandez
- Heart Ryan as Ella Dianne Hyun
- Sara Joe as Freya Hidalgo
- Zeke Polina as Mykel Mitchelle
- Angela Muji as Rakki San Diego
- Jastine Lim as Grace Miller
- Rafa Victorino as Micaela Yumol
- Kyosu Guinto as Joshua Lyle Venites
- Daniel Ong as Mayo Jeson Ramos
- Nic Galvez as Christopher Saimón "Kit" Harrington
- Michael Keith as Eren Kyle De Luna
- JD Axie as Percy Rey Mariano
- AJ Ferrer as Rory Sage Abejar
- Yanyan De Jesus as Andrew "Drew" Klondike Mercado
- Derick Ong as Blaster Wren Madrigal
- Martin Venegas as Denzel Luan Castillo

Supporting cast

- Axel Torres as Michael Angelo Fernandez
- Rhen Escano as Honey Bee Ryder
- Robbie Wachtel as Mir Keigan Watson
- Alexander Payan as Kiko Evans
- Taneo Sebastian as Ryosuke Sato
- Dann Aquino as Cyrus Velasco
- Naz San Juan as Ram Geronimo
- Joko Diaz as Kaizer Watson
- Yayo Aguila as Gemma Fernandez
- Nathalie Hart as Serina Watson
- Kanye Marren Avendaño as Mike Keiren Watson
- Rommel Luna as Mr. Alvin Siongco

Recurring cast

- Nanette Inventor as Malou Fernandez
- Lander Vera-Perez as Jaspher (Jay's dad) Mariano
- Katya Santos as Jeana Fernandez
- Janina Lorelei† as Dr. Celeste Peralta
- Anna Feo as Tita Jenny (S2)
- Love Yauco as Julie Dela Cruz (S1)
- Ysabella Palabrica as Christine (S2: Ep. 6)

== Episodes ==
| Season | Episodes | Originally released | |
| Season | Episodes | First released | Last released |
|---|---|---|---|
| 1 | 16 | January 3, 2025 | April 25, 2025 |
| 2 | 18 | December 5, 2025 | January 30, 2026 |

=== Season 1 ===
| No. | Title | Original release date |
|---|---|---|
| 1 | "Welcome to Section E" | January 3, 2025 |
| 2 | "Special Order" | January 10, 2025 |
| 3 | "Band-aid" | January 17, 2025 |
| 4 | "After the Rain" | January 24, 2025 |
| 5 | "Love Letters" | January 31, 2025 |
| 6 | "Frame-up" | February 7, 2025 |
| 7 | "Superhero" | February 14, 2025 |
| 8 | "The Suitor" | February 21, 2025 |
| 9 | "Positive" | February 28, 2025 |
| 10 | "The Rescue" | March 7, 2025 |
| 11 | "The Festival" | March 14, 2025 |
| 12 | "The Aftermath" | March 21, 2025 |
| 13 | "Fight For Her" | March 28, 2025 |
| 14 | "Profanity" | April 4, 2025 |
| 15 | "The Choice" | April 11, 2025 |
| 16 | "The Engagement" | April 25, 2025 |

=== Season 2 ===
| No. | Title | Original release date |
|---|---|---|
Part 1
| 1 | "Welcome" | December 5, 2025 |
| 2 | "Self Defense 101" | December 12, 2025 |
| 3 | "The Answer" | December 19, 2025 |
| 4 | "Meeting The Father" | December 26, 2025 |
| 5 | "The Dinner" | January 2, 2026 |
| 6 | "Retreat" | January 9, 2026 |
| 7 | "Lost in the Woods" | January 16, 2026 |
| 8 | "Brother" | January 23, 2026 |
| 9 | "The Plan" | January 30, 2026 |
Part 2

== Reception ==
=== Critical reception ===
Nica Glorioso of Nylon Manila described the series as a cliché, but praised Olviga for bringing "depth, vulnerability, and plenty of comedic chops" to her performance as Jay-jay.

=== Audience reception ===
On March 8, 2025, The Philippine Star declared that Ang Mutya ng Section E was "officially a global sensation". Writing for the newspaper, MJ Marfori reported that the series made "huge waves" among foreign audiences, helping them appreciate the unique Filipino charisma. Olviga shared, "We're so shocked by the countless edits where the language is different, and the music is different too. We're so happy that even our comment sections are full of people speaking in different languages." Marfori also noted that the Mutya cast members had become highly popular on social media, with their posts accumulating millions of views and likes on platforms such as TikTok. She described Jay-jay as Olviga's breakthrough role.

== See also ==
- GAT, a P-pop boy group.
- Litz, a P-pop girl group.
- The Rain In España
- List of Philippine films based on Wattpad stories
