= Sa Bawat Sandali =

Single by Amiel Sol
- Language: Tagalog
- English title: At Every Moment
- Released: December 6, 2024
- Length: 5:02
- Label: Ivory Music
- Songwriters: Amiel Sol; Miguel Haleco
- Producer: Miguel Haleco

Amiel Sol singles chronology
"Soup" (2024)	"Sa Bawat Sandali" (2024)	"Nahanap Kita" (2025)

Sa Bawat Sandali (lit. 'At Every Moment' in Tagalog) is a song by Filipino singer Amiel Sol. It was released as a digital single on December 6, 2024, through Ivory Music, and was produced by Miguel Haleco.

== Background and release ==
After the successful single of "Soup", Amiel released the song on December 6, 2024.

== Composition ==
"Sa Bawat Sandali" is five minutes and two seconds long, the song was produced by Miguel Haleco and composed by Amiel Sol himself and Miguel Haleco.

== Music video ==
The music video featured Andres Muhlach and Ashtine Olviga of the Philippine web series Ang Mutya ng Section E. It was directed by Jay Ar Villarojas.

== Commercial performance ==
Following its release on December 6, 2024, "Sa Bawat Sandali" debuted at number 58 on Billboard Philippines Hot 100 for the week of February 1, 2025, and peaked at number three on March 5. It also entered the Top Philippine Songs chart, placing at number three.

== Charts ==
Chart (2024)	Peak position
Philippines (IFPI)	3
Philippines (Philippines Hot 100)	3
Philippines (Top Philippine Songs)	2
