= Ashtine Olviga =

Filipino actress and singer (born 1999)

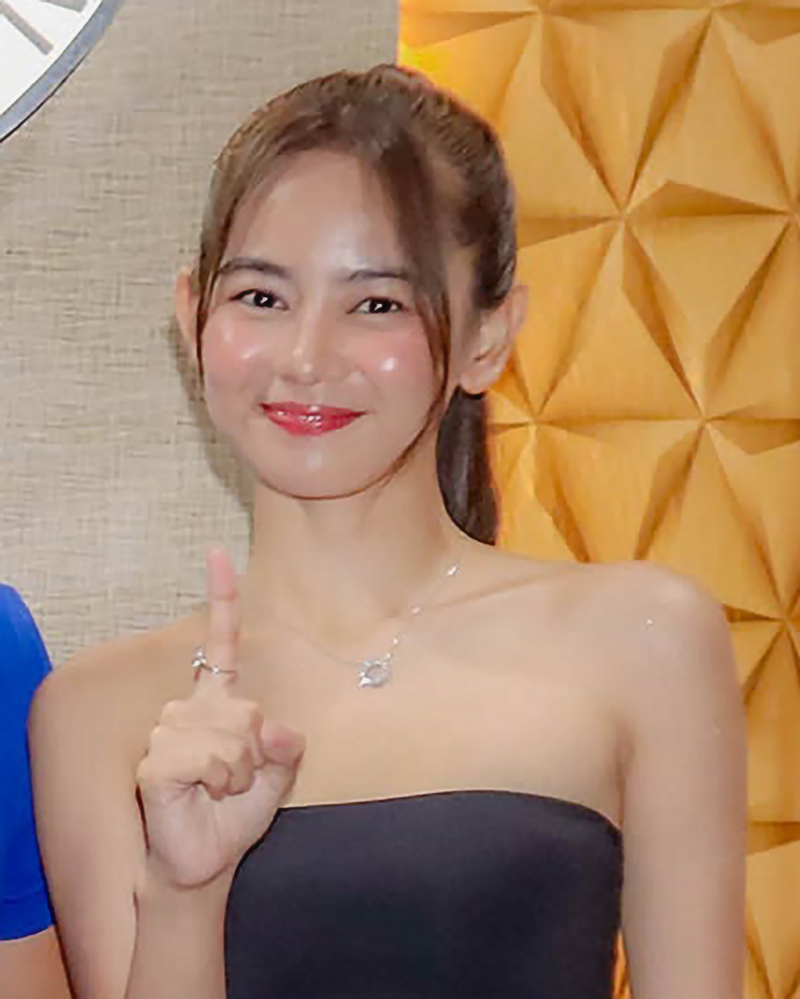
- Olviga in 2025
- Born: Ashtine Olviga; May 19, 1999 (age 27); Calauag, Quezon, Philippines
- Occupations: Actress; singer
- Years active: 2016–present
- Agent: Viva Artists Agency
- Musical career
- Genres: Pop; soft rock
- Instruments: Vocals, Piano
- Label: Viva
- Formerly of: U Go Girls; P-pop Generation; Litz

Ashtine Olviga (born May 19, 1999) is a Filipino actress and singer. In 2016, she joined the reality competition series Born to Be a Star. She later became a member of P-pop groups U Go Girls, P-pop Generation, and Litz. From 2018 to 2024, she appeared in various films and television shows in supporting roles.

In 2025, she starred as Jay-jay in Ang Mutya ng Section E (international title: The Jewel of Section E) opposite Andres Muhlach as Keifer; it was Olviga's first lead role and has been widely described as her breakthrough. In the same year, she starred as Luna in the romance film Minamahal: 100 Bulaklak Para Kay Luna, her debut film project with Muhlach. Her performance earned praise from The Freeman's Januar Junior Aguja, although the film failed to meet box office projections. She also portrayed Piolo Pascual's daughter Agnes Magtibay in Manila's Finest and was nominated for Best Supporting Actress at the 2025 Metro Manila Film Festival for her performance, which the Philippine Daily Inquirer's Hannah Mallorca deemed the film's "biggest surprise".

From March to April 2026, she starred in Viva One Originals: Ashtine, an anthology series where she portrayed different characters each episode. She also released the singles "Love Like U" and "Nasaan Ka Na?" (lit. 'Where Are You?') and announced her first solo concert, Love Like Ashtine in August. A month later, she won Best Actress at the Manila International Film Festival held at Beverly Hills, California, United States. In October, she was announced as one of the leads in the upcoming Philippine adaptation of the Korean television series Fight for My Way, starring as Aira opposite David Licauco as Hanz.

== Early life ==
Ashtine Olviga was born on May 19, 1999 in Quezon, Philippines. She was born into a Catholic family and studied at a Christian school, where she developed a love for reading the Bible. She also served in a church when she was younger.

== Career ==
=== 2016–2024: Beginnings, P-pop career, film and TV roles ===
In 2016, Olviga participated in the reality singing competition series Born to Be a Star; in the same year, she made her screen debut in the romantic comedy film Bakit Lahat ng Gwapo may Boyfriend? (lit. 'Why Do All The Handsome Men Have Boyfriends?'). In 2017, she debuted in the P-pop girl group U Go Girls and joined the supergroup P-pop Generation (Team A) in 2019. That year, she also released her solo debut single, a cover of "Sabihin Mo Na" (lit. 'Just Say It') by Top Suzara. She re-debuted in Litz in 2021; the group disbanded in 2022.

In 2023, Olviga was cast as Tintin, the love team partner of Nestor (Tomas Rodriguez), in the romantic comedy film The Ship Show. The film follows six pairings competing to be the next big love team in the Philippines and was theatrically released on August 9. Later in the year, she also portrayed Cristina in the horror film Marita; Mario Bautista of Journal News Online deemed her one of the "most promising" actors in the cast.

In January 2024, Olviga was cast as a K-pop auditionee in the action thriller film The Guardian. She also portrayed the younger version of Sunshine Dizon's character Gwen in Sunny, a remake of the 2011 South Korean film of the same name. The film was released in theaters on April 10.

=== 2025–present: Ang Mutya ng Section E, breakthrough ===
Shortly before joining the cast of the teen romance series Ang Mutya ng Section E (international title: The Jewel of Section E), Olviga had gone seven months without booking a new role and was considering quitting showbiz. In early 2025, she starred as Jasper Jean "Jay-jay" Mariano in Mutya opposite Andres Muhlach as Keifer. Mutya has been described as Olviga's breakthrough project. (Note: Attributed to Mega, Billboard Philippines, and the Daily Tribune) The series also launched Olviga and Muhlach as a love team dubbed "AshDres", which has been described as "perhaps one of the biggest love teams today".

On July 4, a teaser for Olviga's first film with Muhlach, Minamahal: 100 Bulaklak Para Kay Luna (transl. Beloved: 100 Flowers For Luna) was released. The film was theatrically released in the Philippines on September 24, 2025. It reportedly grossed ₱25 million ($424,340) within its first two weeks, which the Philippine Entertainment Portal's Gorgy Rula considered to be a failure to meet box office expectations. In a review for Minamahal, The Freeman's Januar Junior Aguja lauded Olviga's "effortless" portrayal of the title character Luna, calling her the "clear standout" between her and Muhlach.

Olviga portrayed Lt. Homer Magtibay (Piolo Pascual)'s daughter Agnes Magtibay, a college student who gains an interest in political activism, in the film Manila's Finest. It was an official entry to the Metro Manila Film Festival (MMFF) in 2025, marking her debut in the festival. In a review of Finest, Hannah Mallorca of the Philippine Daily Inquirer described Olviga's performance as "the biggest surprise of the film", praising her ability to "disappear" into the character. Olviga was nominated for Best Supporting Actress at the MMFF for her performance.

In 2026, Olviga starred in Viva One Originals: Ashtine, an anthology series in which she portrayed different characters every episode. The series premiered on Viva One on March 13, with new episodes being released weekly until April 4. On April 22, she released the pop single "Love Like U" and its music video on May 22. The song received a positive review from When in Manila's Andrea Posadas, who called it "simple, wholesome, fun, and so unapologetically Ashtine". In July, she released another single, a Tagalog soft rock ballad titled "Nasaan Ka Na?" (lit. 'Where Are You?'), which she co-wrote. Multiple critics praised her vocal performance in the song.

In August, Olviga headlined her first solo concert called Love Like Ashtine at the New Frontier Theater. She also released her debut extended play of the same name, which reached number one on iTunes in three territories: the Philippines, the United Arab Emirates, and Qatar.

In September, she won Best Actress at the Manila International Film Festival held at Beverly Hills, California, United States. In October, she was announced as one of the leads in the upcoming Philippine adaptation of the Korean television series Fight for My Way, portraying Aira opposite David Licauco's Hanz.

== Other ventures ==
=== Business ===
In 2025, Olviga launched her own fragrance called Ash (stylized in all caps), with the tagline "Scent beyond gender".

=== Endorsements ===
In September 2025, Olviga was announced as an endorser for the restaurant chain Botejyu. In March 2026, she was introduced as a part of shampoo brand Sunsilk's new "Hairkada Trio" alongside fellow Filipino actresses Kai Montinola and Belle Mariano.

== Artistry ==
=== Acting style ===
In May 2026, Metro's Arci Claveria wrote that Olviga "isn't afraid" of being expressive with her face when acting, calling her "the mutya (lit. 'pearl') of the country". Francesca Bacordo of Zeen said that she "doesn't oversell emotions just to make a moment land harder" and praised her "restraint" in both her acting roles and real-life interviews.

=== Music ===
Olviga has named pop singers Taylor Swift, Sabrina Carpenter, and Olivia Rodrigo as some of her musical inspirations, alongside Christian worship acts Taya Smith, Planetshakers, and Elevation Rhythm. In an interview with Ralph Regis of Billboard Philippines, she said that every song on her debut EP Love Like Ashtine was in a different genre and expressed satisfaction towards the diversity of styles.

== Public image ==
Olviga is among the celebrities honored with a resin statue at Star City's Startista Gallery of Filipino Personalities, which opened in June 2026. In an August 2026 essay in the British magazine &Asian, the writer observed that Olviga is frequently targeted by "bizarre" ageism because she is her late 20s (at the time of writing), even though late 20s is not old; they blamed this on misogyny. They also noted that Olviga is subjected to looks-shaming because many Filipinos perceive her as "too Filipino" in appearance. Despite the backlash against Olviga, the article affirmed her as a "young, beautiful, and internationally successful" Gen Z actress. In the same month, the Filipino magazine Zeen called her "one of the most recognizable young personalities of her generation" and praised her for taking her time with her career instead of conforming to the pressure to count achievements constantly.

== Personal life ==
In 2026, Olviga underwent eye surgery to improve her vision.

== Filmography ==
=== Television ===
Year	Title	Role	Notes
2016	Born to Be a Star	Herself	Contestant
2019	Sisters Forever	Jenny	
2020	Tropang torpe	Elaine	
2023	For the Love	Tin	Anthology series; episode: "Ligaya"
2023	Team A	Diane	
2024	Da Pers Family	Osang	
2025–present	Ang Mutya ng Section E	Jasper Jean "Jay-Jay" Mariano	Lead role
2026	Viva One Originals: Ashtine	Various	Anthology series; Olviga portrays all of the main characters in each episode
2026	Fight for My Way	Aira	Lead role; Philippine adaptation of the Korean television series of the same name

=== Film ===
Year	Title	Role	Notes
2016	Bakit Lahat ng Gwapo may Boyfriend?	Friend at bachelorette party	Bit part
2018	Miss Granny		
2023	Will You Be My Ex?	Mitzie	
2023	The Ship Show	Tintin	
2023	Marita	Cristina	
2024	Roadtrip	Young Maricar	
2024	Sunny	Young Gwen	
2025	Minamahal: 100 Bulaklak Para Kay Luna	Maria Luna Cabigting	Lead role
2025	Manila's Finest	Agnes Magtibay	

== Awards and nominations ==
Award	Year	Category	Nominee(s)/Work	Result	Ref.
Anak TV Seal Awards	2025	Female Makabata Star	Ashtine Olviga	Awardee	
Filipino Music Awards	2026	Breakthrough Artist of the Year	Ashtine Olviga	Nominated	
Filipino Music Awards	2026	People's Choice – Artist	Ashtine Olviga	Nominated	
JuanCast Midyear Awards	2026	Ace of the Stage Award	Ashtine Olviga	Nominated	
Manila International Film Festival	2026	Best Actress	Manila's Finest	Won	
Metro Manila Film Festival	2025	Best Supporting Actress	Manila's Finest	Nominated	
Billboard Philippines Women in Music	2026	People's Choice Award	Ashtine Olviga	Won	
PMPC Star Awards for Television	2025	Best New Female TV Personality	For the Love: Ligaya	Nominated	
