= Litz (group) =

Filipino girl group

- Origin: The Philippines
- Genres: Pinoy pop; electronic music; EDM
- Years active: 2020–2022
- Label: Viva
- Past members: Ashtine Olviga; Heart Ryan Evangelista; Bianca Santos; Fatima Añonuevo; Yumi Garcia

Litz (stylized in all caps) was a Filipino girl group under Viva. They were formed in May 2020, with each member individually hand-picked by Viva executive Vic del Rosario. In November 2021, they released a pre-debut single, a cover of "Natataranta" (transl. Bewildered) by James Reid, and revealed their members: Ashtine Olviga, Heart Ryan Evangelista, Bianca Santos, Fatima Añonuevo, and Yumi Garcia.

On March 8, they released their official debut single "Kidlat" (transl. Lightning) on all streaming platforms. In April, the song's music video premiered on YouTube and member Yumi left. They performed at the first Tugatog Filipino Music Festival on July 15. Litz unofficially disbanded around November to December 2022.

== Name ==
The group's name, Litz, means "life in the sunshine", with the S stylized as a Z.

== History ==
=== 2020–2022: Pre-debut, debut, disbandment ===
Viva Records formed the group in May 2020. A year later, they began training under the Filipino dance coach Georcelle Dapat-Sy. The company revealed the members in November 2021: Ashtine Olviga, who was 22 years old at the time; Bianca Santos, then 20; Fatima Añonuevo, then 20; Heart Ryan Evangelista, then 19; and Yumi Garcia, then 18. Each member was individually hand-picked by Viva executive Vic del Rosario. The group originally consisted of six members, but one of them left for Japan due to the COVID-19 pandemic. That month, Litz also released their pre-debut single, a cover of "Natataranta" (transl. Bewildered) by James Reid.

Litz performed live for the first time at the Arrival digital concert, which took place on November 27. They released their debut single, "Kidlat" (transl. Lightning), on all streaming platforms on March 8, 2022. The track was written and composed by Marion Aunor and arranged by Cool Cat Ash of Aunorable Productions. Its lyrics talk about a push-and-pull romantic relationship. Nylon Manila's Rafael Bautista noted that "Kidlat" was "relatively slow" and "not as upbeat as some may expect". He praised the members' vocals in the song. Its music video had a red carpet premiere at Cinema 3 of the Fisher Mall at Quezon City on April 1, at 7 PM. The video premiered on the group's official YouTube channel an hour later. Later in the month, Yumi officially left the group.

Litz released the song "Summer to the Max", a collaboration with Alamat for the streaming service VMX (then known as Vivamax). Their rendition of "Natataranta" was featured on the soundtrack for Pa Thirsty, a VMX film. On July 15, 2022, Litz became one of the many P-pop groups to perform at the first Tugatog Filipino Music Festival at the SM Mall of Asia Arena. They performed "Natataranta" and "Kidlat".

Multiple publications consider 2022 to be their de facto disbandment year. In a feature published on November 13, 2023, the Philippine Entertainment Portal's Nica Jose wrote that the group unofficially disbanded "around late November or early December 2022". Nylon Manila's Nica Glorioso also reported in 2025 that Litz disbanded in 2022.

== Discography ==
| Year | Title | Album | Label | Ref. |
|---|---|---|---|---|
| 2021 | "Natataranta" | Non-album single | Viva Records | |
| 2022 | "Kidlat" | Non-album single | Viva Records | |
Collaboration
| 2022 | "Summer To The Max" (with Alamat) | Non-album single | Viva Records | |
