= Atasha Muhlach =

Filipino actress, singer and host (born 2001)

- Muhlach in 2026
- Born: Atasha Aaron Bonnin Muhlach; November 5, 2001 (age 25); Makati, Metro Manila, Philippines
- Education: Nottingham Trent University
- Occupations: Actress; television host; singer
- Years active: 2011; 2023–present
- Agent: Viva Entertainment
- Parent(s): Aga Muhlach (father); Charlene Gonzales (mother)
- Relatives: Andres Muhlach (twin brother); Bernard Bonnin (grandfather); AJ Muhlach (half-uncle)

Atasha Aaron Bonnin Muhlach (Tagalog pronunciation: [ˈmulak]; born November 5, 2001) is a Filipino actress, singer, and television host. She is the daughter of Aga Muhlach and Charlene Gonzales, and the twin sister of Andres Muhlach. Muhlach started her career in 2023 as a television host on E.A.T., which was later rebranded as Eat Bulaga!, after signing a contract with Viva Entertainment.

== Personal life ==
Muhlach was born on November 5, 2001, at Makati Medical Center in Makati, Metro Manila, to actor Aga Muhlach and former beauty queen, model, and host Charlene Gonzales. She has a twin brother, Andres Muhlach, who was born two minutes younger, and an older half-brother, Luigi "Iggy Boy" Muhlach, Aga's son with actress Janice de Belen. She and Andres were baptized as Catholics on January 8, 2002, in Muntinlupa.

After graduating from the British School Manila in Taguig, Muhlach attended Nottingham Trent University in England, where she pursued a business-related course.

Muhlach attended the prestigious Le Bal des Débutantes in November 2022, an annual event in Paris, France, with a select group of 20–25 girls from around the world to raise funds for young women's charities.

Months prior to her debut as a noontime show host, she earned a business degree with honors from Nottingham on July 28, 2023. Muhlach is a fitness enthusiast and athlete. Apart from basketball, boxing, and golf, and having played for the under-18 women's national rugby team, she also enjoys water sports such as diving, jet skiing, parasailing, snorkelling, swimming, and wakeboarding. She often participates in these activities with her family.

== Career ==
Muhlach has appeared in Jollibee commercials since her childhood, featuring her parents and twin brother Andres. In 2011, she played Brigitta von Trapp, the third-youngest von Trapp child, in a local production of The Sound of Music at the Newport Performing Arts Theater.

With her family already in showbusiness, Muhlach entered the industry after completing business school in Nottingham because her parents encouraged her to focus more on her studies.

During her contract signing with Viva Entertainment in July 2023, she disclosed that her aspiration to join the showbusiness industry had been a dream since she was a kid.

On September 23, 2023, Muhlach was introduced as the newest co-host of E.A.T., now rebranded as Eat Bulaga! and before her introduction, hosts Vic Sotto and Joey de Leon described her as a fashionista, studious, performer, artist, and family-oriented.

On October 25, 2023, Muhlach released her first single, "Pasuyo", under Vicor Music, a record label under Viva Records, which was praised by fans and fellow celebrities for its relatable pop arrangement with composition by Kyle Raphael and produced by JP Verona.

Atasha joined her parents and twin brother, Andres, in a sitcom—marking their first-ever acting project as a family—after officially signing a contract on January 26, 2024, to collaborate with MediaQuest Ventures, Cignal, TV5, Viva Films, Studio Viva, and Viva Entertainment.

Since September 2026, Muhlach has starred as Annie Batungbakal in the musical Bongga Ka, 'Day!: The Annie Batungbakal Musical at the Newport Performing Arts Theater, marking her return to theatre after 15 years and her debut lead role on stage.

== Acting credits ==
=== Film ===
Year	Title	Role	Notes	Ref.
2025	Everyone Knows Every Juan	Alice		

=== Television ===
Year	Title	Role	Notes	Ref.
2023–2024	E.A.T...	Herself	Co-host	
2024–present	Eat Bulaga!	Herself	Co-host	
2024–2025	Da Pers Family	Atasha "Tash" Pers	Lead role	
2025	Bad Genius	Linette "Lin" Estrella	Lead role	
2026–present	ASAP XP	Herself	Recurring guest performer	

=== Theatre ===
Year	Title	Role	Notes	Ref.
2011	The Sound of Music	Brigitta von Trapp	Newport Performing Arts Theater, Pasay	
2026	Bongga Ka, 'Day!: The Annie Batungbakal Musical	Annie Batungbakal	Newport Performing Arts Theater, Pasay	

== Discography ==
Singles
Title	Details
"Pasuyo"	Primary artist: Atasha Muhlach; Released: October 25, 2023; Label: Vicor Music; Format: Digital download
