= Amiel Sol =

Filipino singer-songwriter (born 1999)

- Born: Amiel Isaac Sol; February 14, 1999 (age 26)
- Genres: Pop; OPM; Indie folk
- Occupations: Singer; songwriter; musician; data analyst
- Instruments: Vocals; guitar
- Years active: 2020–present
- Labels: Ivory Music (under Viva Records)

Amiel Isaac Sol (born February 14, 1999) is a Filipino indie singer-songwriter and musician. He gained popularity with his song "Sa Bawat Sandali" which reached the Top 10 on the Spotify Daily Chart and also gained significant attention after being featured in the Philippine television series Ang Mutya ng Section E (2025). Another his single "Ikaw Lang Patutunguhan", released on September 22, 2023, made its debut on the Billboard Philippines Hot 100 at number 98, as revealed in the chart rankings released on February 26, 2025, for the week of March 1, 2025.

His song "Sa Bawat Sandali" debuted at number 58 on Billboard Philippines Hot 100 for the week of February 1, 2025, and peaked at number three on March 5. It also entered the Top Philippine Songs chart, placing at number three. On April 11, 2025, "Sa Bawat Sandali" peaked at number one on the MYX Daily Top 10 chart.

== Early life ==
Amiel Isaac Sol was born on February 14, 1999, in the Philippines. He was raised in a musically inclined family, as his parents first met while singing together in a church choir. He began playing the guitar at a young age and joined Battle of the Bands competitions during high school. Even after he and his bandmates went to different colleges, Sol continued writing and performing music independently.

He was a student in the Makati Science High School. He holds a degree in Mathematics from the University of the Philippines Diliman.

== Artistry ==
Sol has cited Filipino musicians Johnoy Danao and Ebe Dancel as his main influences in songwriting, stating that their work helped shape his own musical style. His music blends romantic lyricism with ambient folk sound. In an interview with The Beat Asia, he shared, his relationship with music began early in his life in elementary school when he learned to play guitar from his neighbor. He noted that his sound traces back to his school days, where he performed pop-rock covers of popular bands like All Time Low and Eraserheads.

Sol's musical style features restrained arrangements, typically built around simple guitar parts and gentle, understated vocals. While his themes typically revolve around relationships, his message of finding in someone a shelter from the storm goes beyond the usual love song just like his song "Sa Bawat Sandali" as reflected the lyrics, Kapag magulo na ang mundo / ikaw ang payapang hinahanap-hanap ko. He is known for writing acoustic-style ballads, usually using the guitar as his main instrument because it is the most accessible to him. Sol has shared that he wants to include more instruments in his future recordings. He started doing this with his song "Fading Away", which showed a noticeable change from his earlier acoustic sound.

== Discography ==
=== Singles ===
List of singles, showing year released, selected chart positions, and associated albums
Title	Year	Peak chart positions	Album	Ref.
Title	Year	PHL	Album	Ref.
"Paglayag"	2021	—	Non-album singles	
"Futures"	2021	—	Non-album singles	
"Stories About Her"	2021	—	Non-album singles	
"Gunita"	2022	—	Non-album singles	
"Di Na Akin"	2022	—	Non-album singles	
"A Day With You"	2022	—	Non-album singles	
"You Make It Right"	2022	—	Non-album singles	
"Fading Away"	2022	—	Non-album singles	
"Ikaw Lang Patutunguhan"	2023	45	Non-album singles	
"Back Of My Mind"	2023	—	Non-album singles	
"Ngayon At Kailanman"	2024	—	Non-album singles	
"Soup"	2024	—	Non-album singles	
"Sa Bawat Sandali"	2024	2	Non-album singles	
"Nahanap Kita"	2025	—	Non-album singles	
"Pagdating Ng Panahon"	2025	—	"SWABE"	

=== Soundtrack appearances ===
List of media in which Amiel Sol's songs have been used
Year	Film/series/program	Song(s)	Ref.
2022	Ikaw Pa Rin Ang Pipiliin Ko	"Ngayon at Kailanman"	
2025	Ang Mutya ng Section E	"Sa Bawat Sandali"	
2025	Seducing Drake Palma	"Nahanap Kita"	
