= Andres Muhlach =

Filipino actor (born 2001)

- Born: Antonio Andres Bonnin Muhlach; November 5, 2001 (age 24); Makati, Metro Manila, Philippines
- Education: Brent International School; Saint Louis University Madrid Campus
- Occupation: Actor
- Years active: 2024–present
- Agent: Viva Artists Agency
- Parent(s): Aga Muhlach (father); Charlene Gonzales (mother)
- Relatives: Atasha Muhlach (twin sister); Bernard Bonnin (grandfather); AJ Muhlach (half-uncle)

Antonio Andres Bonnin Muhlach (Tagalog pronunciation: [ˈmulak]; born November 5, 2001) is a Filipino actor. He is the son of Aga Muhlach and Charlene Gonzales and the twin brother of Atasha Muhlach. He is best known for his role as Mark Keifer Watson on the web series Ang Mutya ng Section E (2025).

== Early life and background ==
Muhlach was born on November 5, 2001, at Makati Medical Center in Makati, Metro Manila, to actor Aga Muhlach and former beauty queen, model, and host Charlene Gonzales. He has a twin sister, Atasha Muhlach, who was born two minutes older, and an older half-brother, Luigi "Iggy Boy" Muhlach, Aga's son with actress Janice de Belen. He and Atasha were baptized as Catholics on January 8, 2002, in Muntinlupa.

He graduated high school from Brent International School in Biñan, where he played for the school's basketball team, and later went to Madrid to study business and communications at Saint Louis University. Upon joining the Philippine entertainment industry, Muhlach left the university and returned to the Philippines, where he finished school in Metro Manila.

== Career ==
=== Debut ===
At four years old, Muhlach first appeared in family-centered commercials for Jollibee, alongside his parents and twin sister Atasha. The Muhlach family were also endorsing brands such as Toyota and Selecta.

=== Breakthrough ===
In January 2024, Muhlach launched his professional career after signing an exclusive contract with Manny V. Pangilinan, chief executive of MVP Group of Companies, and Vic del Rosario, chairperson of Viva Communications.

His first television project is the family sitcom Da Pers Family, which aired on TV5 in July 2024. Muhlach was cast as Mark Keifer Watson, the male lead in the teen romance comedy series Ang Mutya ng Section E opposite Ashtine Olviga. The Viva One series has garnered significant traction among global audiences. His onscreen pairing with Olviga was dubbed "AshDres" and has been described as "perhaps one of the biggest love teams" in the Philippines. In the same year, he starred as Raffy in the romance film Minamahal: 100 Bulaklak Para Kay Luna alongside Olviga. The Freeman's Januar Junior Aguja said that Olviga's performance was clearly stronger than Muhlach's, but saw potential in the latter if he works harder to improve his acting.

Muhlach won the Best New Male TV Personality award at the 38th PMPC Star Awards for Television in April 2025.

In October 2025, it was announced that Muhlach would join the cast of the musical adaptation of the 1984 coming-of-age film Bagets, which starred his father, Aga Muhlach, as the boy-next-door Adie. The younger Muhlach also played Adie in the musical, which ran from January to March 2026 at the Newport Performing Arts Theater in Pasay. Muhlach received mixed reviews for his performance in Bagets. Nikki Francisco of Theater Fans Manila criticized his singing and dancing technique, writing that he "struggles to meet the technical and interpretive demands of live musical theater"; on the other hand, Spot.PH's Jerome Gomez said that despite Muhlach's vocal limitations and "awkward" moments, he "effortlessly lights up every spot of the stage he finds himself in".

== Acting credits ==
=== Film ===
Andres Muhlach's television credits with year of release, title(s) and role
Year	Title	Role	Notes	Ref(s)
2025	Minamahal	Rafael Xavier "Raffy" Murillo	Lead role	

=== Television ===
Andres Muhlach's television credits with year of release, title(s) and role
Year	Title	Role	Notes	Ref(s)
2024–2025	Da Pers Family	Andres Persival	Lead role	
2025–2026	Ang Mutya ng Section E	Mark Keifer Watson	Lead role, 21 episodes	
2026–present	ASAP XP	Himself	Co-host / Performer	

=== Theater ===
Year	Title	Role	Notes	Ref(s)
2026	Bagets: The Musical	Adie	Newport Performing Arts Theater, Pasay	

== Music videos ==
Year	Title	Artist	Notes	Ref.
2025	"Minamahal"	Andres Muhlach and Ashtine Olviga	Released by Viva Records	
2025	"Ikaw ang Miss Universe ng Buhay Ko"	Andres Muhlach	Official music video	

== Awards and nominations ==
Year	Award	Category	Nominated work	Result
2025	38th PMPC Star Awards for Television	Best New Male TV Personality	Da Pers Family	Won
2025	6th VP Choice Awards	Promising Male Star of the Year	Himself	Won
2025	3rd Laurus Nobilis Media Excellence Awards	Brand Endorsement	Himself	Won
2025	73rd FAMAS Awards	German Moreno Youth Achievement Award	Himself, with Atasha Muhlach	Won
2025	53rd Box Office Entertainment Awards	Most Promising Male Star	Himself	Won
2025	Anak TV Seal Awards	Male Makabata Star	Himself	Won
2025	ZEENfluential Awards	Dynamic Duo	AshDres (with Ashtine Olviga)	Nominated
2026	8th Gawad Lasallianeta Awards	Most Outstanding Young Star	Himself	Won
2026	Philippine Arts, Film and Television Awards	Youth Icon Award	Himself	Won
2026	6th TAG Victorious Awards Chicago	TAG Breakthrough Celebrity	Himself	Won
2026	7th VP Choice Awards	TV Actor of the Year	Ang Mutya ng Section E	Won
2026	7th VP Choice Awards	Love Team of the Year	AshDres (with Ashtine Olviga)	Won
2026	7th VP Choice Awards	Breakthrough Star of the Year	Himself	Nominated
2026	7th VP Choice Awards	Movie Actor of the Year	Minamahal	Nominated
2026	7th VP Choice Awards	Music Video of the Year	"Minamahal" (with Ashtine Olviga)	Nominated
2026	7th VP Choice Awards	Fandom of the Year	AshDres	Nominated
2026	7th VP Choice Awards	PIPOL Face of the Year – Male Adult	Himself	Second place

== See also ==
- List of Filipino male actors
- Television in the Philippines
