= Charlene Gonzales =

Filipino actress and beauty pageant titleholder (born 1974)

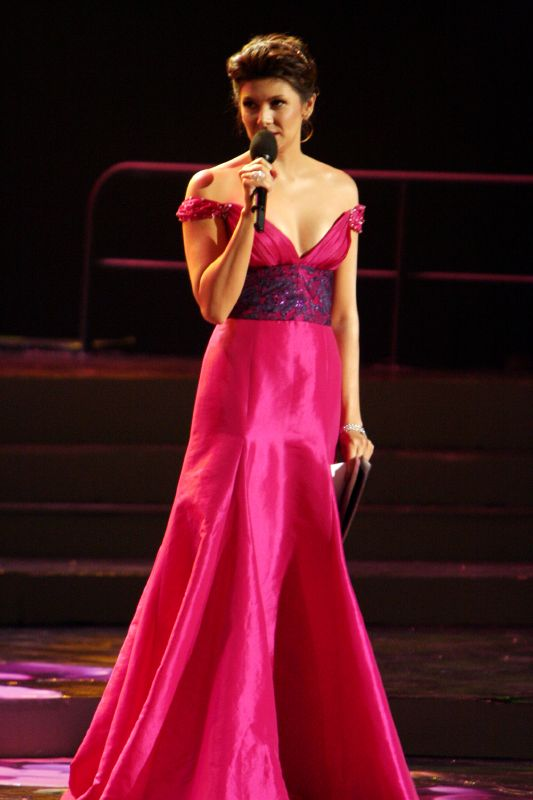
- Gonzales at the Binibining Pilipinas 2008 beauty pageant
- Born: Charlene Mae Gonzales Bonnin; May 1, 1974 (age 52); Quezon City, Rizal, Philippines
- Height: 1.76 m (5 ft 9 in)
- Spouse: Aga Muhlach (m. 2001)
- Children: Atasha Muhlach; Andres Muhlach
- Father: Bernard Bonnin
- Beauty pageant titleholder
- Title: Binibining Pilipinas Universe 1994
- Hair color: Black
- Eye color: Brown
- Major competitions: Binibining Pilipinas 1994; (Winner – Binibining Pilipinas Universe 1994); Miss Universe 1994; (Top 6); (Best in National Costume)

Charlene Mae Gonzales Bonnin-Muhlach (Tagalog: [ʃaɾˈlin gɔnˈsalɛs ˈmulak]; born May 1, 1974) is a Filipino actress, media personality and beauty pageant titleholder. Gonzales won the Binibining Pilipinas Universe 1994 title and represented her country at the Miss Universe 1994 pageant held in Manila, where she won the Best National Costume award and was one of the Top 6 finalists.

She is also a talk show host and a commercial model.

== Early and personal life ==
Charlene Mae Gonzales Bonnin was born to actor Bernard Bonnin and model Elvira Gonzales, on May 1, 1974. Among her siblings is actor Richard Bonnin, and her cousin is Bagets actor J.C. Bonnin. She is the aunt of Glenn Gonzales of the boy band Jeremiah. She is of Spanish ancestry and a maternal descendant of the prominent Pamintuan family of Angeles City. She attended Bishop Amat Memorial High School in La Puente, California, finishing in 1992. She earned a degree in BS Psychology from the University of Santo Tomas.

She married Filipino actor Aga Muhlach on May 28, 2001. They have twin children born on November 5, 2001, named Andres and Atasha, who are both actors and models.

== Pageant career ==
Gonzales won the Binibining Pilipinas Universe 1994 title and represented her country at the Miss Universe 1994 pageant held in Manila, where she won the Best National Costume award and landed in the Top 6. When asked by the host about the number of islands in the Philippines, she boldly asked back, “High tide or low tide?”

== Media career ==
She hosted the dance program Eezy Dancing on ABC-5 (1997–1998) and Keep On Dancing from (1998–2001) on ABS-CBN and Viva Television Movies on Viva TV. She hosted the show, At Home Ka Dito, a Philippine lifestyle program airing on ABS-CBN. Adding to its branding as a show is the introduction of a reality TV treatment to its features, pioneering what may be a new trend—the reality TV lifestyle show.

In 1994, Gonzales got her first film role with Fernando Poe Jr. in Epimaco Velasco: NBI. She also starred in Ben Delubyo with Ramon "Bong" Revilla Jr. in (1998), Resbak with Phillip Salvador (1998), "Bobby Barbers: Parak" with Phillip Salvador (1997), and "Iligpit si Bobby Ortega: Markang Bungo 2" with Rudy Fernandez (1995).

== Filmography ==
=== Television ===
Year	Title	Role
1995–2001; 2025–present	ASAP	Host
1997–1998	Eezy Dancing	Host
1997	1 for 3	Marillen
1998–2001	Keep on Dancing	Host
1999–2000	Oki Doki Doc	Marita
2002–2004	Feel at Home with Charlene	Host
2004–2007	At Home Ka Dito	Host
2008–2009	Proudly Filipina	Host
2008	Binibining Pilipinas 2008	Host
2010–2013	The Buzz	Host
2011	Pinoy Explorer	Guest
2024–2025	Da Pers Family	Charlene

=== Film ===
Year	Title	Role
1994	Ikaw ang Miss Universe ng Buhay Ko	Perla / Pearl
1994	Epimaco Velasco: NBI	Mrs. Yolly Velasco
1995	Iligpit si Bobby Ortega: Markang Bungo 2	Carla
1995	P're Hanggang sa Huli	Jessica
1996	Dyesebel	Dyesebel
1996	Bilang Na ang Araw Mo	Cathy
1996	Ikaw Naman ang Iiyak	Annie Montoya
1997	Bobby Barbers: Parak	Virgie
1997	Bridesmaids	Laura Andrade
1997	Kadre	
1997	Kalabog en Bosyo	Marlene
1998	Ben Delubyo	Karen
1999	Resbak, Babalikan Kita	Vanessa

== Awards and nominations ==
=== Bb. Pilipinas and Ms. Universe awards ===
Year	Organization	Category	Remarks
1994	Miss Universe 1994	Herself	Top 6 Finalist (6th)
1994	Miss Universe	Best in National Costume	Won
1994	Miss Universe	Most Beautiful Hair	Won
1994	Binibining Pilipinas	Binibining Pilipinas-Universe	Won

=== TV awards and nominations ===
Year	Organization	Award	Program	Remarks
2004	18th PMPC Star Awards for Television	Best Lifestyle Show Host	At Home Ka Dito (2003)	Won
2005	19th PMPC Star Awards for Television	Best Lifestyle Show Host	At Home Ka Dito (2004)	Won
2007	21st PMPC Star Awards for Television	Best Lifestyle Show Host	At Home Ka Dito (2006)	Nominated
2011	25th PMPC Star Awards for Television	Best Female Showbiz Oriented Talk Show Host	The Buzz (2010)	Nominated
2013	27th PMPC Star Awards for Television	Best Female Showbiz Oriented Talk Show Host	The Buzz (2012)	Nominated

Awards and achievements
Preceded by Dindi Gallardo	Binibining Pilipinas Universe; 1994	Succeeded by Joanne Santos
