= List of Dyesebel (2014 TV series) episodes =

Mars Ravelo's Dyesebel is a 2014 Philippine fantasy-drama television series based on a famous graphic novel Dyesebel created by Mars Ravelo. Directed by Don M. Cuaresma and Francis E. Pasion, it is topbilled by Anne Curtis, together with an ensemble cast. The series was aired on ABS-CBN and worldwide on TFC from March 17, 2014 to July 18, 2014, after 87 episodes. It is the tenth television drama in the Philippines made by ABS-CBN Studios filmed in high definition. The story follows the journey of a young mermaid named Dyesebel, as she discovers the world above the ocean and locks in a fierce love triangle.

== Series overview and ratings ==
Month	Episodes	Peak	Average Rating	Rank	Source
March 2014	11	33.1% (Episodes 4 and 11)	32.2%	#3	
April 2014	20	33.3% (Episode 14)	29.5%	#1	
May 2014	22	34.9% (Episode 47)	30.6%	#2	
June 2014	21	32.8% (Episode 60)	31.0%	#2	
July 2014	13	31.4% (Episode 78)	27.2%	#2	

== Episodes ==
- The show was originally planned to have 185 episodes, and was originally set to run until November 2014. However, it ended with an incomplete storyline on July 18, 2014, with only 88 episodes produced, and 87 were aired (two produced episodes were merged into a single special for the series finale).

=== March 2014 ===
3rd most watched program in March 2014 with 32.2% average rating.

No. overall	No. in season	Title	Rating	Timeslot / Whole day rank	Original release date	Ref(s)
1	1	"Lucia Meets Prinsipe Tino"	32.8%	#1 / #1	March 17, 2014	
At a town near by the sea, Lucia and her father, Fabian, lives peacefully protecting the ocean. When a dynamite accidentally explodes at the height of the exchange, sending Lucia and her father plunging into the seawater, Prinsipe Tino decides to save them both by bringing them to the shore. The next day, Lucia wakes up at the Hospital and remembers who saved her from death. Drawn to the young woman, Tino once again swims near the shore, only to see Lucia grieving. Tino initially looks on from a distance, but decides to show himself when Lucia catches a glimpse of him and requests that she be given the chance to thank him.
2	2	"The Magic Conch Shell"	33.0%	#1 / #1	March 18, 2014	
While Lucia survives, her father dies due to injuries from the blast. Now, she is living alone by herself. However, she is accompanied by Prinsipe Tino who wants to protect her from Badong, an evil suitor. Because of this, he journeys under the ocean to find the legendary magic conch-shell that can transform him into a human. Now, he vows to Lucia that he will always protect and take care of her. One day, Lucia discovers that she was pregnant.
3	3	"The Birth of Dyesebel"	31.9%	#1 / #1	March 19, 2014	
Lucia gives birth to a healthy baby girl with two legs and calls her "Beatriz" after her late mother. Meanwhile, Reyna Dyangga is making evil plans to overthrow the merkingdom. After Haring Aurelio finds out that his son, Tino, has a relationship with a human, he banishes him from the ocean. However, when he discovers about Tino's good works, he decides to let him return. But Dyangga poisons him for she wanted the throne for herself. One night, Lucia notices how her baby turns into a mermaid when she brings her to the shore.
4	4	"The Death of Prinsipe Tino"	33.1%	#1 / #1	March 20, 2014	
Tino uses the magic conch-shell to turn his baby Beatriz back to human. Upon knowing about what happened to his father, he returns to his kingdom. But Reyna Dyangga accuses him for killing his own father as a part of her evil plans to take-over the throne. Unfortunately, someone discovers Tino's secret, and spreads it to the entire village. That night, Badong and the dynamite fishermen attack Lucia's family which leads to Tino's death. But before he dies, he entrusts his baby to Banak, his long-time best friend. The magic conch-shell is lost, making baby Beatriz a mermaid permanently.
5	5	"The Reign of Reyna Dyangga"	31.9%	#1 / #1	March 21, 2014	
Under the sea, Banak brings baby Beatriz to a quiet and safe place. To protect Beatriz from the other mermaids, she renames her “Dyesebel” and plans to raise her well for she is the rightful heir of the throne. Meanwhile, two mermen saw the dead body of Prinsipe Tino and brought it back to their kingdom. Then, Reyna Dyangga convinces the other mermaids that are the cause of Haring Aurelio and Prinsipe Tino's death. Dyangga wants the other mermaids to believe her and gain their trust. Meanwhile, Lucia woke up in the hospital, looking for Tino and her daughter Beatriz. Lucia even asks the help of the authorities to imprison Badong and those responsible, but nobody believes her because of such unbelievable reasons.
6	6	"Banak Returns to the Kingdom"	32.3%	#1 / #1	March 24, 2014	
Banak takes the role as the mother of Dyesebel. However, Dyesebel’s life outside the safe borders of the kingdom will be dangerous. So Banak returns to the kingdom which is now ruled by Dyangga. Meanwhile, Lucia found a baby inside the carton. She promises to herself to love the baby girl like her own child. The baby becomes her inspiration and move on after the death of Tino and the loss of her daughter.
7	7	"Dyesebel, The Slave"	32.4%	#1 / #1	March 25, 2014	
Banak teaches Dyesebel to be kind towards other merpeople, yet she is still considered an outcast among others. Now, Dyesebel and her mother were turned into slaves of Reyna Dyangga. One day, Dyesebel confronts Prinsesa Coralia, the child of the Queen. Because of this, she was given a punishment of a month-long service for the palace. The young Dyesebel, in spite of her misfortunes, continues to do good just as her stepmother taught her. In one instance, Banak taught a lesson about being different, which the young Dyesebel quickly understood. She decided to hone her talents of dancing and singing, but ultimately decided to focus on the latter.
8	8	"Message in A Bottle: Dyesebel Meets Fredo"	31.4%	#1 / #1	March 26, 2014	
Elena, the long-lost daughter of Stella, returns with her two sons for reconciliation. However, young Fredo is sad thinking he was the reason behind his parents separation. He goes to the shore and makes a message in a bottle. Meanwhile, young Dyesebel swims in the ocean surface and sees Fredo who throws the bottle, which landed directly on her head. Curious about what the bottle is, she gets it and hides it among the rocks. She then hurries home under the ocean and gets scolded by Banak who told her not to go back to the human world.
9	9	"Serving The Princess: Lucia Meets Dante"	31.7%	#1 / #1	March 27, 2014	
Dante and Lucia meet in the beach. The two kids, Fredo and Betty are now friends, while Dyesebel finds a way to avoid fighting with Prinsesa Coralia. The young mermaid promises her mother, Banak to follow all the instructions of the Princess so that they will not get into trouble again. While Dyesebel being nice towards Prinsesa Coralia, the latter continues to plot against her servant.
10	10	"Liro Saves Dyesebel"	29.8%	#1 / #1	March 28, 2014	
Dyesebel follows Prinsesa Coralia’s dangerous demand which leads her to be caught by a fishing net. Luckily, Liro – a young merman saves her, and the two become friends. Dyesebel tells Prinsesa Coralia that it’s better to have no friends than to have fake friends. This angers Coralia, which leads her to ask for something from Reyna Dyangga. Meanwhile on land, Elena tries to steal the title of the resort, but Lucia has caught her in the act. Upon learning what Lucia has witnessed, Stella tells her daughter to leave and never return.
11	11	"Young Dyesebel Saves Fredo"	33.1%	#1 / #1	March 31, 2014	
Fredo is saved by Dyesebel after he and his mother got into trouble at the sea. Dyesebel found the boy on an island where he was alone and crying for help. Pinky Pusit advises Dyesebel to stay away from human beings because of their hostility towards mermaids. However, the young mermaid insisted and helped Fredo. Because of that, Dyesebel and Fredo became friends. But one day, Fredo goes home after the rescuers found him on the island. Dyesebel is saddened she discovers that the boy was no longer there. Now, Dyesebel believes that there are still good people. Meanwhile, Banak scold Dysebel upon learning of her new friend. The little mermaid defends herself but Banak insisted that humans are dangerous.

=== April 2014 ===
Most watched program in April 2014 with 29.5% average rating.

No. overall	No. in season	Title	Rating	Timeslot / Whole day rank	Original release date	Ref(s)
12	1	"The Forbidden Friendship"	32.8%	#1 / #1	April 1, 2014	
After being saved by Dyesebel, Fredo wants to see her again. However, the young mermaid cannot talk to him anymore because Banak forbids it. Fredo goes back to the island where he saw Dyesebel, but he fails to see her. He does not know that Dyesebel sees him and waves goodbye. Meanwhile, Stella rewards Lucia so that she can start her life now that the resort is gone. Elena gets jealous seeing her mother treating Lucia like a real daughter. Join Dyesebel as she grows up into a beautiful mermaid, together with her best friend Liro, Fredo, and Betty!
13	2	"The Voice of Dyesebel"	30.5%	#1 / #1	April 2, 2014	
Dyesebel, Liro, Fredo and Betty have all grown up. They are now having their respective roles in their places. Liro is a good soldier in their kingdom. He is always saving Dyesebel’s life especially from the displeasing attitude of Princess Coralia. On land, Betty wins a swimming competition while Fredo is revealed as her boyfriend. One day, their kingdom is being attack by their enemies. Using her powerful voice, Dyesebel protects the merchildren. At the end of the day, they are victorious and Dyesebel becomes a hero. To please her subjects, Reyna Dyangga grants her one wish. Dyesebel asks her to set Banak free from slavery. Later, Reyna Dyangga receives a warning about a mermaid that can remove her from her throne.
14	3	"The Mermaid Princess"	33.3%	#1 / #1	April 3, 2014	
Liro’s affection for Dyesebel is getting stronger, and his friend, Octavio, notices this. Dyesebel is happy now that she’s finally accepted in the mermaid world without the discrimination she used to suffer. Queen Dyangga has received some information about a mermaid who soon will topple her from the throne, and she vows to hunt for that mermaid. On land, Elena is making evil plans against Lucia while Fredo and Betty is building a good relationship. Now, Betty is suspecting about her family background.
15	4	"Liro's Love Confession for Dyesebel"	30.6%	#1 / #1	April 4, 2014	
Liro has confessed his love for Dyesebel. He needs to be strong so that he can finally express his feelings towards the beautiful mermaid. On the other hand, Banak gets frightened after learning that Dyesebel is named ‘Prinsesa ng Masang Sirena’. She is afraid that Reyna Dyangga will know the true identity of Dyesebel. While Dyesebel becomes well-known to all mermaids in their kingdom, Princess Coralia feels jealous on why these things happen. Because of these, Reyna Dyangga commands her assistant to know the secret of Dyesebel. Meanwhile, on land, Betty and Fredo’s relationship grows stronger. They support each other in their respective field. But despite the love given by Fredo, Betty still has doubts and fears.
16	5	"The Plot of Dyangga and Elena"	30.6%	#1 / #1	April 7, 2014	
Reyna Dyangga is pretending to be nice with Dyesebel in order to know her secrets. Dyesebel doesn’t know the queen’s evil plan. One day, she talks to the queen about her ideas for their kingdom. Dyangga wants to know everything so that she can help, but deep inside her heart she thinks Dyesebel is her enemy. On the other hand, Betty and Lucia are fighting because of Elena. In order to put Lucia’s life in trouble, Elena ignores Betty upon arriving at their home. Betty goes home and gets angry at Lucia. She’s afraid that the issue between her mother and Fredo’s mother will affect their relationship.
17	6	"Liro Loves Dyesebel"	29.6%	#1 / #1	April 8, 2014	
Liro is now pursuing his intention to win the heart of Dyesebel. He starts asking permission from Banak as a sign of his respect and expression of his clear intentions. When Banak gave her approval, Liro starts courting Dyesebel. While Dyesebel teaches the young mermaids, Liro arrives and gives her sea flower. However, Princesa Coralia saw it and confronted the merman on why he gives flowers to Dyesebel. The two did not answer her questions, so one young mermaid answered it. Princesa Coralia got angrier at Dyesebel, but she cannot hurt her for Liro is there to defend Dyesebel. On the other hand, Fredo feels tired on his relationship with Betty. The latter becomes more aggressive and her eyes are always kept on Fredo.
18	7	"Betty Discovers the Truth"	28.5%	#1 / #1	April 9, 2014	
Betty learns that she is only an adopted child of Lucia. This came out after Elena made an investigation about Betty’s mother. Elena is bent on ruining the life of Lucia after the latter did not agree on what she wants for the company. She instructed her assistant, Tomas, to investigate for Lucia’s back-story and found out that Betty is not her child. Then, Elena sourced an adoption paper and addressed it to Betty so that she will discover it. On the other hand, Liro is proud to announce his love for Dyesebel. He wants everybody in their kingdom to know that he is actually courting her.
19	8	"The Necklace of Dyesebel"	30.5%	#1 / #1	April 10, 2014	
Lucia finds it difficult now to even make amends with her adopted daughter, Betty. And to make matters worse, she already knows the truth about her adoption. Lucia consults with Stella about the situation with her believing someone is trying to destroy their mother-daughter relationship. Meanwhile, Fredo comforts Betty, assuring her that her mother only does what is best. In the realm of mermen, there is tension building as Liro’s courting for Dyesebel reaches the farthest corner of the kingdom. It is believed that his affection for the young mermaid will bring disorder amongst merpeople. But Queen Dyangga tries to manipulate things to her advantage. Now she wants Dyesebel to lead a war against the land dwellers. Something she believes is both an opportunity to get rid of the estranged mermaid and to destroy the lives of humans. On the other hand, Dyesebel finds a mysterious necklace hidden amongst Banak’s personal objects. This is the very same necklace her real mother Lucia has given her when she was still a baby.
20	9	"Facing the Danger"	28.4%	#1 / #1	April 11, 2014	
Dyesebel is celebrating her birthday. Liro prepares a surprise to make her happy and he succeeds. Dyesebel thanked him for all the happiness he gave her. While saying that, the place where they are resting shook. Liro protects Dyesebel immediately. Then, they decided to go home. When they are swimming away from the place, a group of fishermen saw them. Now, Liro and Dyesebel are in danger! While the two are hiding from humans, Liro trains Dyesebel how to defend herself. On the other hand, Banak together with Dyesebel’s friends are worrying about them after the underwater earthquake.
21	10	"Prinsesa Coralia's Plot"	30.0%	#1 / #1	April 14, 2014	
Liro and Dyesebel are returned home after the incident that took place between them and the humans. Banak and the rest of the kingdom are happy upon seeing them safe. However, Princess Coralia is still not amused seeing them together. She cannot accept that Liro loves Dyesebel and not her. Because of these, the Princess is planning to sabotage Dyesebel so that Liro will not pursue her interest on the mermaid. On the other hand, Dyesebel wants to know about her real parents. She asks Banak about it, however, it seems like her Banak is hiding something from her and doesn’t want her to know the truth. Because of that, she decides to learn it in her own way. But, Dyesebel will soon be facing another danger.
22	11	"Call Me A Princess"	30.6%	#1 / #1	April 15, 2014	
Liro visits Dyesebel in their place. Banak said to him that Dyesebel left and all the while thought that she visits Liro. After learning the mermaid was gone, they got worried. Banak and Liro are helping each other to find Dyesebel. Meanwhile, Dyesebel and her friends got terrified as they have drifted away from the kingdom. While they are talking, a man named "Hippolonio" suddenly appears before them. Dyesebel thinks that this man is her father, so she gives him a hug. When they decided to go back home, the enemy attacks them. The man protects Dyesebel and calls her "Dear Princess".
23	12	"Drawn Back to the Sea"	28.5%	#1 / #1	April 16, 2014	
Dyesebel is determined to learn the truth about her life despite her misunderstanding with Banak. Liro helps Dyesebel in investigating the mermaid’s ancestors and relatives but no one in the kingdom knows. Now, the only hope of Dyesebel is her mother, Banak. Is Banak ready to tell the truth to Dyesebel, that she is not her daughter? On the other hand, Elena is pretending to help Lucia when it comes to Betty. After learning that Betty is adopted, the lady feels that her mother did not love her and she is just a replacement of Beatriz. Since Lucia is still hoping that she can find her older daughter, she goes back to the place where she used to live.
24	13	"The End of Secrets"	29.0%	#1 / #1	April 21, 2014	
Now, Dyesebel is more determined than ever to find out who she really is. As she swims through the clues, one thing always leads her to discover that her father could be Prince Tino. She confronts Banak about it. But every time she tried, she only gets denials. But it’s battling up inside her that she breaks down and raised voice at her mother. Meanwhile, a message in a bottle has reached Fredo as he strolls along the seashore. The same has reminded her of a young mermaid whom he met many years ago as a child. He brought this up again to Betty. But sick of the mystical tales of the young man, she gets hostile about it. On the other hand, Prince Liro could only be there for the one he loves.
25	14	"The Truth Reveals"	28.5%	#1 / #1	April 22, 2014	
Dyesebel still wants to know the truth. She feels that Banak had secrets about her true identity. Because of that, she keeps on asking her stepmother about it. Now, Banak was not about to control her feelings and said to Dyesebel that she did everything to become a good mother. By hearing it, Dyesebel realizes that she is an adopted… that she’s not Banak’s daughter. Moved, Banak finally give in and tells the truth to her adopted daughter. Then, she leaves her mother because of the pain that she feels. On the other hand, Fredo went to the island where he first met Dyesebel. What will be the ending of the friendship between Fredo and Dyesebel? What will be the reaction of Betty when she learns this?
26	15	"Dyesebel Learns The Past"	28.5%	#1 / #1	April 23, 2014	
Banak tells the truth about Dyesebel’s past. The mermaid gets hurt now that she learns the whole story. Now, Dyesebel understands why she is different from the other mermaids around her. On the other hand, Fredo is staying near the sea, believing that he might see Dyesebel again. Betty calls him but Fredo’s number is out of coverage. When Fredo arrives, she learns where he goes the whole day. She goes mad upon hearing the name of Dyesebel. They Betty breaks Fredo’s gift for Dyesebel. What will happen next, now that Dyesebel learns the truth? Will Fredo and Dyesebel meet again soon?
27	16	"Longing For A Mother"	30.0%	#1 / #2	April 24, 2014	
After learning the truth, Dyesebel is now longing to know her real mother. Because of this, the mermaid decides to observe the human world so that she has knowledge about the background of her mother. Dyesebel’s friends are worried about her idea because they know that this will put her at risk. On the other hand, Fredo gets disappointed at Betty’s behavior recently. His girlfriend always gets irritated and easily gets jealous on things. Fredo is now thinking about leaving Betty. Meanwhile, Lucia and Betty are spending time together in a resort. The two are playing beside the seashores. This scenario was seen by Dyesebel, and makes her feel jealous.
28	17	"Dyesebel Avoids Liro"	27.2%	#1 / #2	April 25, 2014	
Liro is wondering why Dyesebel keeps on hiding away from him. He notices it everytime he visits in their place. Because of these, he asks Dyesebel’s friends but no one will give him information what happened to the mermaid. On the other hand, Dyesebel stays away from Liro because she afraid to tell the truth about her true identity. She feels afraid that Liro will reject her if he will know that she is part human. Meanwhile, Betty and Fredo are breaking up. The two have been in a rocky relationship lately. Betty gets hurt and feels afraid that Fredo will be gone after what happened. So, she seeks advice from Elena, Fredo’s mother.
29	18	"The Price of the Truth"	28.7%	#1 / #2	April 28, 2014	
The price of knowing the truth seems to be too much for Dyesebel. Now that she knows where she comes from; who her parents are. Like a shockwave, it knocked every corner of the kingdom of mermen. Liro could not believe at first that this truth was hidden from him by Dyesebel. She could not help it, for she needs to protect her mother. Banak feels helpless. Now, Queen Dyangga is in a mermaid hunt, and she wants Dyesebel to be eliminated. It cannot be someone like Dyesebel who can topple her reign. So she devises a plan to pin down Dyesebel as perpetrator of Orga’s death.
30	19	"Finning Through Fears"	27.9%	#1 / #3	April 29, 2014	
Betty admits that there is nothing more painful than being friend-zoned. All her life she had always admired and treated Fredo more than a friend. As a mother, Lucia knows how devastating this is for Betty. Losing someone, she knows first hand how that feels. Fear of losing, however, is what two mermaids are feeling right now. Banak is scared that they could be banned from the mermaid kingdom. Dyesebel came face to face with Reyna Dyangga who still thinks that she is a threat to their Kingdom. Dyesebel still tried to show her loyalty towards her but she also knows that she is up to no good. Dyesebel has no choice but to reveal her true identity to her trusted friend, Liro, so he will understand why she is acting strange and why Reyna Dyangga is trying to set her up so desperately. But his anxiety has been replaced by fear that he might lose Dyesebel. This truth Prince Liro knows will be the mermaid’s destruction. He has to do something about it, and he has to protect his love for Dyesebel.
31	20	"Dyesebel is Doomed"	28.0%	#1 / #2	April 30, 2014	
Two soldiers have been accused of conniving with humans in stealing precious pearls from the kingdom. Queen Dyangga had imposed penalty of death on the two to which Gobi strongly disagreed but he succumbed to the majesty’s intimidation in the end. It has been made clear among mermen and mermaids that whoever the queen finds betraying her and had been working with the humans, will pay with their lives. Banak is afraid for Dyesebel. This only means hostility and danger awaits for the mermaid once everyone in the kingdom learns about her identity. However, Liro could not believe that the very person he loves is part human. Dyesebel is heartbroken upon seeing Liro’s reaction. Rejection is hard to come by. But what she fears the most is that Liro is not the last merman in the kingdom to know she is part human. Soon, the news will reach Queen Dyangga and Dyesebel is doomed.

=== May 2014 ===
2nd most watched program in May 2014 with 30.6% average rating.

No. overall	No. in season	Title	Rating	Timeslot / Whole day rank	Original release date	Ref(s)
32	1	"The Trial of Dyesebel"	28.3%	#1 / #2	May 1, 2014	
The merfolks of the Kingdom have to hear from Dyesebel herself why she was seen hugging the statue of Prinsipe Tino whom they considered as a traitor to their land. Now, everybody knows that she is the only daughter and true heir to the throne. Reyna Dyangga finds a way to get rid of her. So she commands a soldier to kill Orga and frame-up Dyesebel. Now that her plans succeeded, Dyesebel faces the punishment despite her innocence. Even Liro and other mermaids cannot defend her. On the other hand, Betty attempts suicide after their break up with Fredo.
33	2	"Dyesebel's Transformation"	28.6%	#1 / #2	May 2, 2014	
Now that Dyesebel is also considered as a traitor by her people just like what happened to her father, Prinsipe Tino, she had to escape with her mother Banak and the only way is to live in the world of humans. She tried her best to find the magical shell that has the ability of transforming mermaids into humans. With her courage and persistence, she was able to have in her possession the much-coveted and priceless magical shell.
34	3	"A Whole New World"	29.5%	#1 / #2	May 5, 2014	
Since Dyesebel is determined to find Banak, she decided to use the magic conch-shell in order to get human legs that she needed on land. The next day, a fisherman and his wife saw her near the seashore. However, the man pretends that he is good and willing to help her find her mother. Fortunately, Dyesebel escapes the fisherman's evil schemes. Now, Dyesebel discovers a whole new world where she finds it very strange and different from the merkingdom. After such a long time, Dyesebel and Fredo are finally going to meet each other again.
35	4	"Follow That Barracuda!"	29.9%	#1 / #1	May 6, 2014	
Dyesebel comes to land to find her mother, Banak. Unfortunately, she trusts some humans who wanted to abuse her innocence for a large sum of money. After getting herself in danger, Dyesebel explores the human world. And finally, she meets Fredo again, but they didn't recognize each other. Then, she follows the mini bus after seeing the name of Barracuda. She thinks that she can now see her mother but she fails. On the other hand, Banak gets away from the hands of Reyna Dyangga to find Dyesebel. Despite the risks on her life, she is willing to do everything to see her daughter.
36	5	"The Lost Shell"	28.9%	#1 / #1	May 7, 2014	
Dyesebel is feeling lonely and alone because she does not know where to go in this big city. Even the humans whom she trusted tried to take advantage of her innocence and she was about to get in danger. It is good that Fredo dreamt about her and they finally met eye to eye for the first time. Now, the mermaid does not know where she can find her mother, so she goes to the bayside. While thinking alone, Dyesebel hears the voice of her friends, calling her name. She sees Pinky (the squid) and Carlo (the seahorse) on the water, and they are happy to accompany her. Later, Dyesebel realized that the magical shell is lost! On the other hand, Fredo was distracted during his basketball game after seeing Dyesebel again. He feels that they have connection to each other because they are always meeting unexpectedly. Fredo is hoping to meet Dyesebel again now that he finds the magic conch-shell.
37	6	"Wrong Hands"	31.9%	#1 / #1	May 8, 2014	
Banak is caught by humans after she went searching for her daughter Dyesebel. Banak is unfortunate to be kidnapped by Kanor who is planning to sell her. It is good that this person contacts the right person to sell the mermaid – Lucia Reyes who is Dyesebel’s real mother. Lucia will do what it takes to get information on the whereabouts of her lost daughter. She believes her daughter is in the mermaid world, and so she needs another mermaid to confirm this. Meanwhile, Dyesebel got herself in danger once again! Dyesebel is busy searching for her magical shell that she accidentally lost inside a gymnasium. She was about to leave when Fredo saw her outside and decided to park his car. He was about to approach her when he saw a group of men grabbing Dyesebel and placing her inside their van. Dyesebel gets a taste of man's cruelty. Can Fredo save her before it's too late?
38	7	"Dyesebel Enters the World of Fredo"	30.2%	#1 / #1	May 9, 2014	
After meeting each other, Fredo and Dyesebel became friends. Fredo brings Dyesebel to his house so that he can introduce her to his parents and to prove that she is real. Dyesebel feels shy while entering Fredo’s house. Elena, Fredo’s mother, welcomes her and invites her for dinner. When Dyesebel comes to the dining table, she directly notices the swimming pool. Dyesebel feels afraid to come nearer because everyone will know her true identity if she touches the water. However, Thomas brings her closer to the pool and Dyesebel falls into the water. Luckily, she did not transform into a mermaid! She later discovers that only seawater can turn her legs back to tail. Meanwhile, Lucia closes a deal with Kanor that can lead her closer to her lost daughter.
39	8	"Dyesebel Meets Lucia"	31.3%	#1 / #1	May 12, 2014	
Now that Fredo and Dyesebel are friends, he introduced her to his mother who wants to know more about her. But fate turns against Dyesebel again as the people around her starts to suspect that something is wrong with her. Meanwhile, Banak escapes from Kanor's evil hands with the help of some street children (who hid her tail and put her inside a cart). However, Lucia is devastated that the mermaid that is supposed to be sold to her is a scam. It would have been her only way to get information about her lost daughter. When Banak needs water, the street children brings her to a bay where she could swim freely. Unfortunately, two drunkards catch sight of the mermaid and call some company. The children quickly put her back inside the cart and run away. Later, the news reaches Dyesebel and Lucia as the TV reports a mermaid spotted near the bay. Dyesebel accidentally met her mother without even knowing that it was her. At the end, Dyesebel finds her shell necklace near the bay which gives her a clue that Banak just might be around the city.
40	9	"A Fresh Start"	30.6%	#1 / #1	May 13, 2014	
Dyesebel decides to conceal her real identity to Fredo especially upon knowing that Dante is hunting for her kin to give justice to his colleagues’ death. Dyesebel and Fredo are in love after being together. But the road to love is not easy especially when he will learn that Dyesebel is the sister of Betty. Lucia feels something is in Dyesebel that makes it comfortable to be with her. But Fredo feels confused right now. He knows he likes her, but courting her will just spoil the moment. He and Betty have just broken up, and he doesn’t want Dyesebel to be her rebound girl.
41	10	"Mermaid in the City"	30.5%	#1 / #1	May 14, 2014	
Dyesebel accidentally falls into the saltwater and transforms into a mermaid once again. She tries to swim away from the humans, but Fredo follows her and everybody is there to see if she is alright. Luckily, she uses her magic conch-shell to turn her back to human. Dyesebel is grateful to have met Lucia. She did not realize that humans could be this affectionate and passionate. Lucia is longing to see her lost daughter soon. She feels something is in Dyesebel that is easy to come with. Meanwhile Banak will be put into danger again. She needs to protect herself in the human world.
42	11	"Betty Returns"	29.9%	#1 / #1	May 15, 2014	
Fredo falls deeply in love with Dyesebel and she is in loved with him as well. For that reason, he tells her about his love and sincerity. Then, he gives her flowers while they are in the bay walk. On the following night, Fredo invites Dyesebel in a dinner. While they are talking, Fredo feels surprised upon seeing Betty calling his name and coming to their table. He introduces Betty and Dyesebel to each other. But Betty's return may put a stop to their blooming relationship. Now that she is back, she wants to get his love back whatever the cost it may take. On the other hand, Banak is still safe in the hands of the street children. She gives them a reward by making the kids swimming and site seeing under the sea.
43	12	"Betty Versus Dyesebel"	30.6%	#1 / #1	May 16, 2014	
Betty is back to make sure that Fredo does not fall in love with Dyesebel. She has to make sure that Dyesebel does not fall in love with Fredo by telling her that Fredo belongs to her. Dyesebel starts avoiding the advances of Fredo while convincing herself that they are not meant for each other because he is a human and she is a mermaid. Liro meets Fredo, his biggest rival when it comes to the love of Dyesebel. Betty is getting jealous that even her mother is very close to Dyesebel. She does not know that Dyesebel is her lost sister who happened to be her toughest rival when it comes to the love of Fredo.
44	13	"Revelation to Fredo"	31.0%	#1 / #2	May 19, 2014	
Tension is building between Dyesebel and Betty. Betty feels her mother Lucia has only known Dyesebel for such short time but it feels like they have known each other for so long. She tells Dyesebel to stay away from her and her mother. She is better off remain a worker in the company. But if there is one thing she cannot afford to push away is Fredo. Everytime she tries to bring herself back in, Fredo is a step further away from her. Betty believes that Dyesebel is a threat. However, she will find a confidante in Fredo’s mother. Meanwhile, Fredo has confronted Lucia that she and Betty are over. Now, he loves Dyesebel. But Dyesebel has torn apart in this situation. Perhaps, it is time for her to flee to go back to the sea and find her mother, Banak. But Fredo will follow her, further stamping her true love for the fair mermaid.
45	14	"The First Kiss"	31.3%	#1 / #2	May 20, 2014	
Fredo is determined to win the heart of Dyesebel despite the hindrances of his mother and Betty. Fredo already admitted that he loves Dyesebel and Betty was there to witness it. She turned down the love of Fredo because she cannot bear to see Betty getting hurt. After the mermaid left the hotel of Lucia, Fredo went out to find her. The latter is willing to do everything just to see her okay. Now that he finds her, Fredo witnessed Dyesebel in her mermaid form for the first time. But a unique circumstance made Fredo fight for his love for Dyesebel when he learned that she is a mermaid. He will fight for her at any cost. Upon seeing each other, Dyesebel tries to control her feelings and tells Fredo to stay away from her. The mermaid even said that they are not meant for each other, because she is a mermaid and Fredo is a human. However, Fredo said that his feelings never change despite the truth. For this reason, Dyesebel has a courage to fight her feelings for Fredo and accepts the love he offers.
46	15	"Fight For Love"	30.3%	#1 / #2	May 21, 2014	
Since Dyesebel is in her mermaid form, Fredo helps her by finding the magic conch-shell so that she can walk again. On the other hand, the family of Fredo is searching for him because he's been gone for almost two days without telling them where he is. Lucia and Elena are meeting in the police station after learning that Dyesebel and Fredo were gone for two days. Betty is also shocked upon learning that they were lost. Now, she wants to know the secret of Dyesebel and Fredo. Meanwhile, Fredo was secretly hiding Dyesebel in their bathroom upstairs, and he keeps on looking upstairs while being questioned that aroused their suspicions. Betty ran upstairs to see what he is hiding because he was truly lying. Meanwhile, Banak was seen in a Marine Park with the other mermaids. So Fredo accompanied Dyesebel to go there just in case they find her mother Banak. But Dyesebel did not know that the mermaids have already planned an attack against the humans.
47	16	"The New Dyesebel"	34.9%	#1 / #1	May 22, 2014	
Betty and Elena are going to join forces to make sure that Fredo does not continue his love for Dyesebel. Betty feels that Fredo is hiding something about Dyesebel, and she is very determined to find that secret and reveal it to everyone. Banak has been spotted near the shore by the patrolling mermen and they are going to tell the Queen Dyangga all about what they saw. Meanwhile, Dyesebel asks her Fredo to teach her how to read and write. She is doing it not just for Fredo’s family but also for herself. Now that Dyesebel is invited to a family dinner in Fredo's house, the latter protects his girlfriend especially to his mother, Elena. On the other hand, Elena finds a way to get rid of Dyesebel from her son. She does not want the mermaid to be part of her family. So she instructs Betty to move faster to get her son back so that she will not see the mermaid in their house anymore.
48	17	"The War Begins"	31.5%	#1 / #2	May 23, 2014	
Because of frustrations, Betty finds a way to get rid of Dyesebel. She is pretending to be nice again to Fredo and to the mermaid. She even wants to get equal with Dyesebel especially on swimming, but she fails. Now, Betty feels angrier towards Fredo’s new girlfriend, Dyesebel. On the other hand, Liro instructs a man to find Dyesebel while she is on the land. In order for this man to obey what he wants, he told him to destroy his family if this he will refuse. What will happen to Fredo and Dyesebel’s love story?
49	18	"Dyesebel Is In Danger"	32.6%	#1 / #1	May 26, 2014	
Fredo and Dyesebel continue loving each other despite the challenge of their relationship. In order to get rid of the mermaid in the life of Fredo, Betty and Elena are making plans. Betty invites Dyesebel in a party and gives her more hard liquor in order to get drunk. She is doing it so that Betty can get some information from Fredo’s girlfriend. Even though Fredo does not agree on the idea, Dyesebel still goes with Betty. On the other hand, Liro finds a way to get Dyesebel back on their place as instructed by Reyna Dyangga. Aside from that, he is also doing it after learning that the mermaid has a relationship with a human being.
50	19	"The Agreement"	31.4%	#1 / #1	May 27, 2014	
Dyesebel is on danger after a man caught her. She learns that the man needs help to save his wife from Reyna Dyangga. In order for him to save his wife, he must get the shell from her and bring back to Reyna Dyangga. However, it did not happen. Fredo is on the rescue after learning that someone gets his girlfriend using an L300 car unit. He finds the place where this man was hiding. Upon seeing him and Dyesebel, Fredo instantly hits this man and Dyesebel gets the shell. Now, the man is asking to help him get his wife back and he will not hit Dyesebel again.
51	20	"A Mermaid Secret"	31.6%	#1 / #1	May 28, 2014	
Dyesebel’s secret is once again revealed to her curious friend Sally. Will she be able to accept Dyesebel or will she despise and reveal her true nature to the human world? And with the exposure of Banak to the human land, Lucia was able to have renewed hope about getting to meet her daughter Beatriz once again.
52	21	"The Hunt for Mermaids"	28.6%	#1 / #1	May 29, 2014	
Now, Lucia negotiates with Dante to finance his project, Bantay Sirena or the hunt for mermaids. But she asked the gentleman never to kill when they find one, and that he must bring her one mermaid alive. She tells this plan to Stela; she cannot help but gets worried about Beatriz, for she is a mermaid and she needs to be safe. Unknown to her, Reyna Dyangga has connived with a human. However, Betty has other dark plans against Dyesebel because she wants to unravel her secrets.
53	22	"Reunited"	29.7%	#1 / #1	May 30, 2014	
Dyesebel has finally reunited with her mother Banak. After having been separated since their flee from the kingdom, Dyesebel has dreamt of one day being reunited with her foster mother. As she and her friends, with the help of Fredo, were strolling around the city, they happened to spot a wooden cart being pushed by kids. Inside the cart, it appeared that the woman with long hair is Banak, so Dyesebel calls on her. At last, they have finally seen each other. Dyesebel and Fredo brought them to a friend’s house where the kids can also stay. But while Dyesebel rejoiced with the events, Lucia is still looking for her daughter.

=== June 2014 ===
2nd most watched program in June 2014 with 31.0% average rating.

No. overall	No. in season	Title	Rating	Timeslot / Whole day rank	Original release date	Ref(s)
54	1	"Liro Becomes Human"	31.2%	#1 / #1	June 2, 2014	
Now, Dyesebel learns that her mother Banak is looking for her, and even risking her life being with humans in her mermaid form, just to go out looking for her. And Lucia, upon entering an agreement to finance a mermaid expedition, will it end in a successful venture or in a great disaster? Now, Liro has turned into a legged merman as he intends to find Dyesebel and bring her back to the ocean kingdom.
55	2	"Liro Comes Out"	29.4%	#1 / #2	June 3, 2014	
Liro decides to be in the human form because of his love for Dyesebel. After he receives the shell, his fish tail turns into legs just like the mermaid. Now, he starts to find Dyesebel and Banak. On the other hand, Fredo helps his girlfriend to find the shell in the hands of Mang Kanor. However, they fail after Mang Kanor’s companions see them while going inside the place. In order to get rid of them, Dyesebel uses her voice to make all the people fall asleep. Meanwhile, Betty continues finding the true identity of Fredo’s girlfriend. She even makes a surprise visit to Dyesebel’s house just to find information; however, Betty did not succeed.
56	3	"The Abduction of Dyesebel"	30.7%	#1 / #2	June 4, 2014	
Liro pursues his plan to kidnap Dyesebel. He is doing this because of anger and revenge against humans. Liro was very disappointed when he met Dyesebel because the mermaid left him and chose to be with Fredo. On the other hand, Banak feels worried about her daughter who does not come home since she left. When Fredo learns about this, he instantly started to find her. However, instead of helping each other, Fredo and Banak are having arguments. When Dyesebel was home, Banak tells her how Liro saves their lives from the hands of Reyna Dyangga.
57	4	"The Search"	29.8%	#1 / #2	June 5, 2014	
Liro wants to talk to Dyesebel, so that she will understand what really happen. But to his surprise, Dyesebel asks forgiveness and thank him that he saved their lives from Reyna Dyangga's cruelty. Now, Liro continues offering his help to them, but Dyesebel is trying to refuse it. With the help of Fredo and Liro who is now a human, Dyesebel is close to finding her real mother. As they travel on land searching for clues, Liro and Fredo are having conflicts, and Dyesebel is in between. Meanwhile, Elena is about to discover Lucia's secret, and her connection to Dante.
58	5	"The Secrets of Mabaklad"	30.6%	#1 / #2	June 6, 2014	
Dyesebel is more determined than ever to find her biological mother. Piece by piece, she puts back the puzzle of the identity of her mother. First, her foster mother Banak had told earlier about a human being who feel in love with a merman. With the help of Fredo and Liro, their path is leading to Barrio Mabaklad where pearl ornaments and necklaces are being sourced from. The ornament is the same thing she discovered from Banak’s chest. She consults a Barangay Official, and asks about a lady who fell in love with a merman.
59	6	"Mother of the Mermaid"	31.8%	#1 / #1	June 9, 2014	
Dyesebel has gone to Barrio Mabaklad where she finds a group famous for their renowned marine-inspired ornaments. Dyesebel has been told that her biological mother is alive. And using the ornament she got hold from Mother Banak, she traces the origin of the ornament. There at the Barangay office, she discovers that there is a woman who fell in love with merman, bore a child and lost it. The search of Dyesebel will reach the desk of influential Lucia. She wonders why the young lady is looking for such information. But it is no surprise now for Banak that eventually, the Dyesebel will be led to her real mother. For Dyesebel has in her possession, the shell necklace, as a clue.
60	7	"The Necklace of Love"	32.8%	#1 / #1	June 10, 2014	
Mother Banak discovers that Dyesebel has gotten hold of a familiar ornament. She learns that it was the same as the shell necklace she used to hide in her chest. It turns out, the young mermaid is tracing the origins of the necklace. The secrets is hidden in Barrio Mabaklad, the same town where Lucia and Prince Tino met. Meanwhile, Fredo is threatened by Liro’s existence. But Betty will find an unlikely ally in the merman-turned-human. She will finally use him to get Fredo back into her arms.
61	8	"Fredo Versus Liro"	30.5%	#1 / #3	June 11, 2014	
Now, it is Fredo versus Liro as both are in a race to win the heart of the fair mermaid. But Dyesebel sees them exchanging blows, and stops them. Then, she tells Fredo that Betty just wants to destroy their relationship by making stories between her and Liro. Meanwhile, Lucia finds a bit of more hope as she gets closer to finding her real daughter. Will Banak finally open her heart and tell Dyesebel who her real mother is?
62	9	"A Love Triangle"	30.9%	#1 / #2	June 12, 2014	
Dyesebel gets hurt of what Fredo is doing to Liro. Because of jealousy, Fredo hits Dyesebel’s best friend in front her. So, the mermaid decides to end her relationship to the man she loves because of lack of trust. Fredo feels lonely on what just happened. When Betty sees it, she grabs the opportunity to get back to Fredo. On the other hand, Lucia reveals the true identity of her long lost daughter to Banak. Now, Dyesebel’s foster mother feels afraid that anytime, Lucia and Dyesebel will know each other about their relationship.
63	10	"The Necklace Connection"	32.1%	#1 / #3	June 13, 2014	
Now, Lucia and Dyesebel meet along the way. Lucia, seeing Dyesebel lonely, asks her what she feels deep inside. Dyesebel tells her how it feels that something is empty and something is missing in her life. Lucia answers that she knows how the mermaid feels. Dyesebel does not know where to start. Lucia tells her that in times of trouble, she should not give up. But Dyesebel is afraid to fail and that things will never come up as they should be. As the Dyesebel drops the shell necklace, will Lucia finally find her lost daughter?
64	11	"Lucia's Suspicion"	30.9%	#1 / #1	June 16, 2014	
Lucia is starting to doubt about the identity of Dyesebel. She knows that mermaids could get feet through a magic conch-shell. On the other hand, Dyesebel is also starting to figure out what Lucia did to search for her daughter. On the other hand, Banak gets even more paranoid. She has the key to the secrets, while Lucia and Dyesebel will soon discover the truth. Meanwhile, Betty and Elena find out that Dyesebel is only adopted by Banak. Now, Lucia confronts Banak about it, and she is starting to realize that Dyesebel, whom she thinks could be a mermaid, might be her lost daughter.
65	12	"The Big Plan"	30.5%	#1 / #1	June 17, 2014	
Betty could not really get it how her foster mother does not care so much about her. She thinks that Lucia only cares about looking for her lost daughter. Now that Lucia discovered the truth about Dyesebel being adopted, she confronted Banak, who the latter also confirmed. Lucia’s suspicion is growing now that she gets more clues: the shell necklace and Dyesebel's adoption. She plans on throwing seawater at Dyesebel’s legs, hoping she would turn into a mermaid.
66	13	"She's My Mother"	31.1%	#1 / #1	June 18, 2014	
Despite Lucia's efforts, it has been revealed that her daughter has been found dead. But the most terrible discovery is that the Reyna Dyangga and her merman armies have found out that she is Prinsipe Tino’s human wife. And this will pose a big threat on Lucia and Dyesebel’s lives. But Dyesebel also finds out the most difficult truth: Lucia has the same shell necklace placed on top of the grave of her supposedly dead child. Now, she wanted to know the truth straight from her foster mother, Banak.
67	14	"Reyna Dyangga Abducts Lucia"	31.0%	#1 / #1	June 19, 2014	
Dyesebel feels excited to inform Lucia, her real mother, the truth about her identity. However, when she and Fredo went to Lucia’s house, they learn that Lucia and Betty was on a vacation. Fredo tries to contact them, but the number was out of coverage area. So, Dyesebel is crying and hoping that they can talk sooner. On the other hand, Lucia and Betty was enjoying their time together. But Reyna Dyangga paid some men to arrest Lucia. Instantly, Dyesebel learns the news through Fredo and Liro. She is now planning to save her mother.
68	15	"Saving Lucia"	31.8%	#1 / #1	June 20, 2014	
Reyna Dyangga learns that Prince Tino's human wife, Lucia, still lives and decides to use Liro for an important task. Will Dyesebel be able to save Lucia or will she be forever trap in the hands of Reyna Dyangga before it's too late?
69	16	"In My Daughter's Eyes"	32.2%	#1 / #1	June 23, 2014	
Lucia is now safe with Banak after she was saved by Fredo together with Dante and his companions. Upon seeing Banak, Lucia confronts her because of hiding the truth. Lucia learned the truth that Dyesebel is her daughter while she was in the hands of Reyna Dyangga. Because of this, she is now feeling angry to Banak. But despite the feelings, Lucia needs to set aside her emotions and help each other to see the condition of Dyesebel. Meanwhile, Fredo’s father was hit by a merman. He is now in the hospital resting after the medication was given by the doctor.
70	17	"The Two Mothers"	31.2%	#1 / #1	June 24, 2014	
Lucia and Banak’s worst nightmare have happened indeed. For so long, Lucia wanted to be with her daughter. Only to find out that she has always been with her all the time. Banak tries to explain, she is doing her best to be a mother to Dyesebel. But Lucia insists she is the real mother and she should not be deprived of this right. It is too late, even for Liro who now has evil plans against the humans and even to Dyesebel.
71	18	"The Evil Sister"	30.9%	#1 / #1	June 25, 2014	
Betty learns that Dyesebel is the real daughter of Lucia. She cannot accept the fact that she has now an elder sister. Because of this, she wanted Dyesebel to have DNA test to be sure that she did not lie to her mother Lucia. In order to have ally, Betty goes to Elena and tells the story. Now, Fredo’s mother determines to stop the relationship of Dyesebel and Fredo. On the other hand, Reyna Dyangga and Liro are pursuing through the plans of having vengeance to all humans including Dyesebel.
72	19	"The DNA Result"	30.6%	#1 / #1	June 26, 2014	
Dyesebel is now safe from the hands of those who want to hurt her. At least for now, especially that she has Fredo right their beside her. One time he noticed that Betty is taking strands of hair from Dyesebel. Fredo confronts the lady about it and asks what was her plan on the mermaid, but Betty denies it. Unknown to Fredo, she already has taken a few strands, enough for her and Elena to use as sample for DNA testing. Liro, on the other hand, has taken his anger against the humans into a new level. He found out that the Bantay Sirena leader turns out to be the father of Fredo, his closest rival to Dyesebel’s heart.
73	20	"The Scrutiny"	30.2%	#1 / #1	June 27, 2014	
Betty and her folks are so puzzled to find out that Dyesebel is not what they hoped she is. It turns out she is something even more mysterious. Betty planned it, so that she can really prove whether Dyesebel is related to her mother Lucia or not. Now the experts have articulated that the DNA results have shown something different. He learned that he cannot trace the DNA of Dyesebel to any human being even to Lucia, her real mother. In fact, it is the DNA that has something of different origin. Will they discover Dyesebel's real identity as a mermaid?
74	21	"The Upcoming Danger"	30.1%	#1 / #1	June 30, 2014	
Banak and Dyesebel were separated after Lucia wanted to spend time with her daughter. However, upon arriving on Lucia’s house, Betty cannot accept that the person she wanted to get out from her life is now living with them. Because of this, Betty went upstairs crying. On the other hand, Reyna Dyangga and her armies are determined to wage war against the humans. Now, Liro is their informant and he provides intelligence regarding the Bantay Sirena led by Dante, the father of Fredo who happens to be his rival in winning the heart of Dyesebel.

=== July 2014 ===
2nd most watched program in July 2014 with 27.2% average rating.

No. overall	No. in season	Title	Rating	Timeslot / Whole day rank	Original release date	Ref(s)
75	1	"Welcome Home"	29.0%	#1 / #1	July 1, 2014	
Fredo finally asks Dyesebel to marry him, and the latter happily accept it. Lucia celebrates with Dyesebel as she welcomes and introduces her as her long lost daughter. Betty is making plans against Dyesebel. She is really sick of her because she thinks that Dyesebel stole everything from her. She is now finding a way to get rid of Dyesebel. Meanwhile, Liro is making a way to get Dyesebel back and steal the magic conch-shell.
76	2	"Around Your Truth"	30.0%	#1 / #1	July 2, 2014	
During the engagement party, Betty sees Dyesebel having a mermaid tail, while she is in the restroom. After seeing Dyesebel, Betty instantly leaves her and informs everybody that she is a mermaid! However, nobody believes her especially that Dyesebel has legs in front of them. Now, Betty determines to know the truth. Everytime Dyesebel is going out, she follows her. On the other hand, Dyesebel is having trouble while she and Fredo are preparing for the things needed in their upcoming wedding. Her trouble starts when she learned from Liro that there are two mermaid caught by Bantay Sirena.
77	3	"Friend or Foe"	28.6%	#1 / #2	July 3, 2014	
Elena and Betty are pretending to be good on Dyesebel. They are doing it so that no one can discover their plans on the wedding day of Fredo and Dyesebel. While they secretly planning all of this, Lucia now learns that Liro was the one who made the wrong information about her daughter. Liro has thought of this so that Dyesebel will not know her real mother. Now that his plan had failed, he is conniving with Elena and Betty’s plan. When Dyesebel learns about this, she confronts Liro telling him that she doesn't want to see him anymore.
78	4	"The Wedding Nightmare"	31.4%	#1 / #1	July 4, 2014	
The wedding of Fredo and Dyesebel is finally happening. Everyone is present at the church, especially Fredo who is excited waiting for her bride. When Dyesebel arrives, the wedding ceremony starts. However, the wedding turns out into a nightmare after Betty pours seawater on Dyesebel's legs while marching. Everybody including the media sees the transformation of Dyesebel’s legs into tail. Meanwhile, Liro is also ready to get the mermaid once the people inside the church panic. Now, the entire plan is working. What will happen to Dyesebel now that her identity is revealed?
79	5	"The Mermaid Rescue"	30.4%	#1 / #1	July 7, 2014	
The happy occasion takes a turn for the worse when Betty sets out her ultimate act of retribution against Dyesebel. Soon enough, Dyesebel finds herself in the middle of an insurmountable ordeal as her secret is revealed before everyone. Dyesebel is in the laboratory subjected under the microscope, and is being studied by worthless scientists. She is asking for her freedom but she can't escape because she needs to be studied so that humans can defend themselves against mermaids. Liro is turning his back against Reyna Dyangga and wants to save her. At the end, Fredo and his father Dante are making their move to save the fair mermaid.
80	6	"The Sacrifices of Fredo"	29.7%	#1 / #1	July 8, 2014	
Fredo saves the mermaid with Dante his father. However, despite how they take care of things in private, somebody in authority noticed their plan. Because of this, Fredo is at risk from the authority. Dante sacrifices his life to help Fredo and Dyesebel escape the facility. On the other hand, all merman armies continued their plan to ruin the life of every human they encounter. This happens after Menandro, Liro's uncle, gets caught by the Bantay Sirena, and is now endanger from the hands of people.
81	7	"Revenge Against The Mermaid"	26.3%	#1 / #1	July 9, 2014	
Lucia, Banak, Fredo, and Dyesebel are now hiding away from the authorities. Elena is still hungry for revenge and this time she sets another plan with the help of Kanor. She is bent on taking revenge against at the mermaid, so she decided to connive with Reyna Dyangga. On the other hand, Betty learns that Elena only used her, so she promised herself that she must pay, because Lucia is being dragged into the pit. Meanwhile, Reyna Dyangga suggests they must take action or else they will lose everything.
82	8	"The Stolen Shell"	30.5%	#1 / #1	July 10, 2014	
As guilt takes over Fredo, Elena's wrath toward Dyesebel escalates after learning about what happened. The whole family is grieving especially, Fredo who cannot come during the funeral for saving Dyesebel. But despite the danger, Fredo tries to see the burial ceremony. On the other hand, Dyesebel feels that she's a burden so she decided to run away. Unfortunately, she encounters Kanor and two mermen along the way. She fights back, but the magic conch-shell was stolen. Now, Dyesebel needs to sacrifice as she saves a family drowning in the sea.
83	9	"The Real Queen"	29.5%	#1 / #1	July 11, 2014	
Lucia, Banak and Fredo found Dyesebel in her mermaid form hiding inside a hut, owned by the family she rescued from drowning. Now, Menandro is back on the merkingdom with anger against Reyna Dyangga, for she did not even try to save him while being caught by Bantay Sirena. He urges to do what is right by telling Prinsesa Coralia that she's not the rightful heir of the throne. Prinsesa Coralia confronts her mother who eventually tells her the truth and that she did everything for her own good. Because of that Reyna Dyangga decided to get rid of Menandro. But before he died, he reveals all the secrets attempting the merman armies to turn their back against the queen. Liro is determined to lead the army and they all believe that Dyesebel is their real queen.
84	10	"Dyesebel's Decision"	29.5%	#1 / #1	July 14, 2014	
Liro learns about Dyesebel's true identity as the rightful heir to the throne after Menandro pays the heavy price of going against Dyangga. Together with Gobi and Octavio, Liro organizes a coup d'etat against Dyangga to set things right in their kingdom. All the merfolks believe that it is time to rebel against the queen. Now, Liro steals the magic conch-shell from Reyna Dyangga, and gives it back to Dyesebel as a proof of his loyalty. It is also his way of saying sorry for what he has done to her. On the other hand, Reyna Dyangga punishes all the mermen who want to fight against her. As Dyesebel faces a difficult choice, will she save the merkingdom or will they suffer from Dyangga's hands forever?
85	11	"Return to the Sea"	22.7%	#1 / #1	July 15, 2014	
Dyesebel's battle for her kingdom begins. It is also Liro's chance to ask for her forgiveness. But Dyangga is preparing for Dyesebel's return to the sea as she plans to eliminate her. At the merkingdom, Dyesebel and Liro tries to save the merpeople who are against Dyangga. In the end, they got caught from Dyangga's trap while they are trying to help Gobi escape. As Betty sincerely reconciles with Lucia, Elena is finding a way to break their relationship. She's pretending that Betty is still with her. What will happen now that the authority captured Lucia and Fredo? Will Dyesebel and Liro succeed as they encounter a great danger against their enemies?
86	12	"Fight for the Throne"	20.9%	#1 / #1	July 17, 2014	
After learning the truth, Dyesebel needs to take her responsibility as their queen in order to make all things right. Since she and Fredo have exchanged vows already, it is hard for her to decide now. Although it's a difficult choice, Dyesebel returns to the sea as she sets off to defeat Dyangga and save her kingdom. But Dyangga will never stop until she eliminate Dyesebel and get the magic conch-shell. As Dyesebel and Liro try to escape from Dyangga, they will encounter a great danger from other enemies: the sea monsters! Will they face another battle, or will they gain new allies to fight for the throne?
87	13	"Queen Dyesebel"	23.1%	#1 / #1	July 18, 2014	
Under the sea, Dyesebel gains the loyalty of the sea monsters and uses this privilege to get the throne. She defeats Dyangga and celebrates victory as the new queen of the merkingdom. On land, Stella risks her life protecting Lucia from Mang Kanor. This prompts Elena to reconcile with Lucia. Meanwhile, Banak goes to the merkingdom and informs Dyesebel that Stella died. As Dyesebel tries to bring peace between the two feuding worlds, Dyangga vows to bring chaos in the peace that the mermaid has established. The war of man against mermaids begins, which causes Liro's death in the end. After the battle and the peace is restored, Dyesebel and Fredo bid farewell to each other. Queen Dyesebel fulfills her royal duty, while Fredo becomes a protector of the ocean. The story ends with Dyesebel running to Fredo in the shore, and Lucia showing them their baby daughter, Alona.

== Preempted Episodes ==
- April 17, 2014 - This episode has been preempted in observance of Lent.
- April 18, 2014 - This episode has been preempted in observance of Lent.
- July 16, 2014 - This episode has been preempted due to technical failure caused by Typhoon Glenda.
