= Dyesebel (1990 film) =

1990 Filipino romantic fantasy film

- Directed by: Mel Chionglo
- Written by: Ricardo Lee
- Based on: Dyesebel by Mars Ravelo
- Starring: Richard Gomez; Alice Dixson; Dennis Roldan; Chat Silayan; Nadia Montenegro; Carmina Villarroel
- Cinematography: Rody Lacap; Pedro Manding Jr.; Ricardo Jacinto
- Edited by: Efren Jarlego
- Music by: Archie Castillo
- Production company: Regal Films
- Release date: January 18, 1990
- Country: Philippines
- Language: Filipino

Dyesebel is a 1990 Filipino romantic fantasy film based on the Pilipino Komiks character of the same name. Directed by Mel Chionglo from a screenplay by Ricardo Lee, it stars Alice Dixson as the titular character and Richard Gomez, alongside Nadia Montenegro, Dennis Roldan, Chat Silayan, Perla Bautista, Lawrence Pineda and Mario Escudero. Produced by Regal Films, the film was released on January 18, 1990.

== Cast ==
- Richard Gomez as Edward
  - Robert Ortega as young Edward
- Alice Dixson as Dyesebel / Sabel
  - Carmina Villarroel as young Dyesebel
- Nadia Montenegro as Malou
  - Arlene Ragasa as young Malou
- Dennis Roldan as Dennis
- Chat Silayan as Banang
- Perla Bautista as Dyesebel's mother
- Lawrence Pineda as Dodo
- Mario Escudero as Dyesebel's father
- Malu de Guzman as Marina
- Vangie Labalan as Toyang
- Flora Gasser as maid
- Judy Ann Santos as Iday
- Harvey Viscarra as Bokbok

== Production ==
The production of Dyesebel lasted two years. It is the first film adaptation of Dyesebel to feature scenes shot underwater, as well as the first Dyesebel film where the titular character has an orange tailfin.

== Release ==
Dyesebel was released on January 18, 1990. Since its release, the film is cited to have made actress Alice Dixson a mainstream celebrity in Philippine show business.

=== Home media ===
The entire film was made available on YouTube for streaming without charge by Regal Entertainment on September 9, 2020, two decades after the film's release.
