= Dyesebel (1996 film) =

1996 Philippine fantasy film

- Directed by: Emmanuel Borlaza
- Screenplay by: Emmanuel Borlaza; Frank G. Rivera
- Based on: Dyesebel by Mars Ravelo
- Produced by: William Leary
- Starring: Charlene Gonzales
- Cinematography: Gener Buenaseda
- Edited by: Danny Gloria
- Music by: Nonong Buencamino
- Production company: Viva Films
- Distributed by: Viva Films
- Release date: January 4, 1996
- Running time: 115 minutes
- Country: Philippines
- Language: Filipino

Dyesebel is a 1996 Philippine fantasy film directed by Emmanuel Borlaza. Based on a Philippine graphic novel of the same title by Mars Ravelo, the film stars Charlene Gonzales as the titular mermaid.

== Plot ==
Tino, a fisherman live a simple life with his wife Lucia. Until Lucia got pregnant, and gave birth to a mermaid, whom they named Dyesebel. One day, Dyesebel ran away from home and went to another fishing village. There people took her claiming that mermaids caused bad luck to them. Tino and Lucia came to save Dyesebel. Lucia asked Dyesebel to go far while Tino was beaten to death by some fishermen who took Dyesebel, who was adopted by another mermaid named Banak.

== Cast ==
- Charlene Gonzales as Dyesebel
- Matthew Mendoza as Fredo
- Gloria Diaz as Banak
- Jaclyn Jose as Lucia
- Julio Diaz as Tino
- Albert Martinez as Gildo
- Kristine Garcia as Betty
- Gary Estrada as Juno
- Charina Scott as Young Dyesebel
- Maritoni Fernandez as Dyangga
- Dindi Gallardo as Bangenge
- Marita Zobel as Issa
- Romeo Rivera as Nilo
- Don Pepot as Mang Kiko
- Vivian Lorraine as Minda
- Ama Quiambao as Instructress

== Production ==
The film was announced in 1994 with Ana Roces initially cast as the titular mermaid. However, due to her weight problems at that time, the role was later on given to Charlene Gonzales. This prompted Roces to leave Viva Films the following year.

The character portrayed by Gonzales first appeared in the 1994 film Ang Pagbabalik ni Pedro Penduko.

== Release ==
The film was slated to be released in late January 1996. However, it was pushed back to January 4, the original release date of Ang Pinakamagandang Hayop sa Balat ng Lupa, which was having release issues in Metro Manila theaters.
