= Dyesebel (2014 TV series) =

2014 Philippine television drama series

- Title card
- Genre: Drama; Fantasy; Romance
- Created by: ABS-CBN Studios
- Based on: Dyesebel by Mars Ravelo
- Developed by: ABS-CBN Studios; Dindo Perez; Rondel Lindayag
- Written by: Shugo Praico; Dindo Perez; John Anthony Rodulfo; John Joseph Tuason
- Directed by: Don M. Cuaresma; Francis Xavier E. Pasion; Darnel Joy Villaflor; Jon S. Villarin
- Creative director: Johnny delos Santos
- Starring: Anne Curtis
- Narrated by: Anne Curtis
- Opening theme: "Tangi Kong Kailangan" by Lea Salonga with the ABS-CBN Philharmonic Orchestra
- Country of origin: Philippines
- Original language: Tagalog
- No. of episodes: 87 (list of episodes)

Production
- Executive producer: Roldeo T. Endrinal
- Producer: Kylie Manalo-Balagtas
- Production locations: Coron, Palawan; Metro Manila
- Editor: Rommel Malimban
- Running time: 26-28 minutes
- Production companies: Dreamscape Entertainment Television; Mars Ravelo Komiks Characters Inc.

Original release
- Network: ABS-CBN
- Release: March 17 – July 18, 2014

Related
- Dyesebel (2008)

Mars Ravelo's Dyesebel is a 2014 Philippine television drama romance fantasy series broadcast by ABS-CBN. The series is based on a Philippine graphic novel of the same title by Mars Ravelo and television series aired on GMA Network in 2008. Directed by Don M. Cuaresma, Francis Xavier E. Pasion, Darnel Joy R. Villaflor and Jon S. Villarin, it stars Anne Curtis in the title role. It aired on the network's Primetime Bida line up and worldwide on TFC from March 17 to July 18, 2014, replacing Honesto and was replaced by Hawak Kamay.

The story follows the journey of a young mermaid named Dyesebel, as she discovers the world above the ocean and locks in a fierce love triangle.

== Synopsis ==
A beautiful young mermaid, Dyesebel, takes on a journey to trace her origins until she finds out that she is the daughter of a merman and a human. Disowned by the sea for being the child of Tino who was the prince of the sea and the human Lucia, she starts her adventure and explores the human world where she will meet Fredo. But this journey will be marked by a realization that she is not accepted by both worlds. And as a war between man and the underworld appears imminent, Dyesebel will choose to leave those that she loves.

— Official IWanTV! (now iWantTFC) Synopsis

== Plot ==
The story begins when Tino, a prince of the merfolk, meets Lucia, a young woman from a fishing village. Enraged by the destruction wrought by some fishermen on marine life, Tino vows revenge on humans. However, he has a change of heart when he witnesses Lucia and her father arguing with a group against using dynamites to fish. When a stick of dynamite accidentally explodes at the height of the exchange, sending Lucia and her father plunging into the seawater, Tino decides to save them both by bringing them to the shore. While Lucia survives, her father dies due to injuries from the blast. Drawn to the young woman, Tino once again swims near the shore, only to see Lucia grieving. Tino initially looks on from a distance but decides to show himself when Lucia catches a glimpse of him and requests that she be given the chance to thank him. At first, shocked to see Tino's tail, Lucia remembers his efforts to save her and her father. She returns to the beach after initially fleeing, and sits beside Tino to talk about her life, as he does. After Haring Aurelio banishes Prinsipe Tino from their kingdom, Prinsipe Tino goes back to Lucia. He tells her that he doesn't regret his decision. He says he will always choose his family because he loves them dearly. Soon, Lucia goes into labor and gives birth to a baby girl. Lucia and Tino are overjoyed and name the baby Beatriz after Lucia's mother. One night when Beatriz won't stop crying and Tino is nowhere to be found, Lucia goes to the Banca, intending to bring Beatriz to the hospital on her own. When Beatriz's feet get wet with seawater, her legs turn into a fishtail. Only the magic conch shell can turn the baby's tail back to its normal feet. Although surprised by their daughter's strange form, they promise to love their child no matter what. But in no time at all, their neighbors discovered the couple's secret. When the community is hit with a series of catastrophes, the town believes that the anomaly is caused by Dyesebel; an accusation that leads to Prinsipe Tino's death. Before her father is killed by an angry, superstitious mob, Dyesebel is taken to the ocean by him through Banak where she is sent into exile since her chances for survival are greater there than on land.

Years have passed, little Dyesebel goes near the shore and a bottle lands on her head. She inspects the bottle and she grows curious about the piece of plastic on her hand. Fredo, meanwhile, thinks he saw a little girl in the water. Dyesebel goes back home and finds Banak panicking because she is nowhere to be found. Banak scolds Dyesebel for making her worry. She scolds Dyesebel more when she finds out she went to the shallow waters. Banak remembers what happened to Prinsipe Tino. She tells Dyesebel that the people will kill her if they capture her. Dyesebel calms Banak down and tells her not to worry anymore because she's safe. She also promises not to go back to the shallow waters. Days later, Dyesebel saves Fredo from drowning during a tsunami wave. She befriends Fredo without revealing that she's a mermaid. Fredo talks to Betty and tells her about his friend Dyesebel. He tells Betty that Dyesebel is always in the water. Dyesebel, meanwhile, talks to Liro and tells him about Fredo. She tells him not to be afraid of humans because she has met a good human in Fredo. Later, Dyesebel also talks to her sea friends and reveals to them her secret. She sings to let them know that she has an unseemly voice. The other mermaids hear her singing and mock her voice. Dyesebel is very sad and she swims away to a place where she can be alone. She stays there and sings all by herself. After some years have passed, Dyesebel went swimming freely in the sea, now all grown up and very beautiful. Likewise, Fredo, Liro, and Betty have now grown into adults. Dyesebel decides to let go of her memories of Fredo. She goes to the place where she last saw young Fredo to return the bottle he left for her. When she's near the shore, Fredo is there looking out to the sea and shouting in frustration. Dyesebel thinks he's weird and she says so. Fredo hears the voice and swims towards it. While he doesn't see anyone, what Fredo sees amazes him even more. He sees the bottle he left for Dyesebel. He calls out her name and he dives into the sea to look for her. Fredo doesn't see her but he is happy because this time he knows that Dyesebel is not a figment of his imagination. This time he will do everything to look for Dyesebel.

Reyna Dyangga pins Ginang Orca's death on Dyesebel and she makes sure the whole kingdom knows that Dyesebel is the daughter of Prinsipe Tino and a human. This is unacceptable to most of the kingdom and they decide that Banak and Dyesebel should die. In the morning, Dyesebel and Banak are released in an area inhabited by deadly sea monsters. Dyesebel and Banak plan on fighting the sea monsters and escape. They escape the sea monsters. Dyesebel goes straight to where the magic conch-shell is hidden and she manages to sneak in and get it. She is also able to defeat the soldiers of Reyna Dyangga. However, she loses sight of Banak, who is by that time, being captured by fishermen. Dyesebel immediately swims ashore and begs the magic conch-shell to help her. She rubs the shell and her tail transforms into human legs. Dyesebel is helped by a couple and given clothes. The man brings her to Manila and Dyesebel somehow senses that the man has bad intentions towards her. Indeed, the man is selling Dyesebel to several men. She finds a chance to escape from the men. She wanders alone in Manila. She is confused by the noise and multitude of people in the city. She wanders some more until she ends up in the middle of the street. A car stops short of running her over. Fredo comes out of his car and stops when he sees Dyesebel, captivated by her beauty. Fredo saves Dyesebel from the men holding her captive. They also help the other women captured by these men. However, as they are about to leave the house, a group of men accost them. Luckily, Fredo's friends arrive and help them beat up the men. Fredo hears Dyesebel mention her name to the police. Fredo asks Dyesebel if she has met a boy on the shore when she was a kid. Dyesebel nods and asks if he is Fredo. They hug each other, very happy to find each other at last. When Fredo sees fishermen cast a net over Dyesebel, he dives in and helps her get out of the net. They swim ashore and Fredo ties a shirt around Dyesebel's wounded tail. Fredo learns of Dyesebel's search for Banak and he promises he will help her get back her magic conch-shell so that they could find Banak. But first, they have to tend to Dyesebel's wounds. Fredo also finds out that Dyesebel's real mother is human. Fredo then tells her that he is willing to fight for their love, no matter the cost, just like Dyesebel's parents fought for each other. Fredo overrides all her protests until Dyesebel promises him.

Lucia spills what she believes is seawater on Dyesebel's legs, but Dyesebel's legs do not turn into a mermaid's tail. After leaving Dyesebel, Lucia cries in disappointment. Liro sees everything that happened and he suspects that Lucia is Dyesebel's mother. Liro pays an old man to tell Lucia that a baby mermaid died in his care after a man left her to him. He shows Lucia where the baby is buried. Lucia opens a small wooden coffin and it has a skeleton of a baby mermaid with a shell necklace on top. She cries because this time she is sure that Dyesebel is dead. She buries the remains of the baby mermaid whom she believes to be Beatriz. Dyesebel goes to the burial to console Lucia. After Lucia leaves, Dyesebel goes to Beatriz's tomb to pay her respects and she sees a shell necklace beside it. It is the same necklace that links her to her mother. Dyesebel cries as she remembers all the clues that tell her that Lucia could be her mother. She goes to Banak and Banak confirms her suspicion. Dyesebel accuses Banak of lying to her again and she runs away from Banak. Lucia is about to be killed by a group of mermen and he asks them why they are doing this. They tell her that they captured her so that Dyesebel would return the magic conch-shell. Now that they have it, they have no more use for her. Lucia is confused and the mermen mock her ignorance. Lucia thinks some more until the truth dawns on her: Dyesebel is her daughter, her missing Beatriz. Pinky and Karlo help her escape the mermen. Dante and Fredo, with a group of seamen, also come to her rescue. Dyesebel wakes up with Lucia sleeping beside her. Lucia opens her eyes and hugs Dyesebel tightly. Dyesebel cries and tells her mother that she wants to call her as mother. Meanwhile, Betty finds a way to know what Lucia is keeping secrets from her. When she learns that Dyesebel is no other than Beatriz, she screams in anger and disbelief.

While walking down the aisle in her beautiful wedding gown, Betty approaches Dyesebel and spills seawater on Dyesebel's legs. Dyesebel's legs turn into a mermaid tail. Angry people swarm around Dyesebel and beat her up. Lucia and Banak can do nothing to stop the people from beating Dyesebel. Fredo becomes bloodied in his attempt to save Dyesebel. Liro uses his merman shout to clear the people away from Dyesebel, but men from the Bantay Dagat shoot Liro and carry Dyesebel away. Dante Montilla died while trying to help his son Fredo save Dyesebel. Dyesebel and Fredo exchange wedding vows in front of Lucia, Banak, and their loyal friends. Fredo tells Dyesebel that he doesn't regret even their painful memories because it brought him to Dyesebel, while Dyesebel professes to do what she can to bring peace to their relationship and their lives. With the help of his cousins, Liro gets the magic conch-shell from Reyna Dyangga and he uses it to fight Dyangga's men. Liro goes to Dyesebel and gives her the magic conch-shell. He tells her that she is the rightful heiress to the King's throne and that they need her help under the sea. Dyesebel eventually decides to fulfill her duties as queen of their kingdom. Dyesebel sought to finally end the war between her people and those on land by seeking dialogue with the human government. This, after a string of casualties from the hostilities, including Stella and Dante. Ena regrets her evil deeds. She goes to Lucia and asks her forgiveness. Betty also begs forgiveness from Dyesebel.

Now recognized as the rightful queen of the merfolk, Dyesebel led her kind to a cave where the first blood in the long-waged war was shed. Here, she negotiated with humans to put an end to their destructive ways of fishing, which has long been the reason for mermaids' animosity toward them. Dyesebel pushes for a peace treaty between humans and mermen. However, Dyangga gets in the way and causes a violent encounter between human and mermen soldiers. In an attempt to sabotage Dyesebel's efforts, the ousted queen triggered fighting once more with the help of her henchman, Kanor. Liro, Dyesebel's childhood friend, was killed after taking a bullet for her. The loss of a loyal soldier pushed Dyesebel to make a desperate plea to stop the fighting, this time by physically tackling the warring sides and putting herself in harm's way. When Coralia, Dyangga's daughter who had bullied Dyesebel as a child, was caught in the sight of a human soldier, Dyesebel did not hesitate to plunge into the water to save her from a gunshot. Dyangga, captured by humans, could only look on as the mermaid she has hated for so long took a bullet for her daughter. For Dyesebel, it was the ultimate sacrifice—risking her life for the same family who had plotted the assassination of her father, Tino, to seize his throne. Dyesebel's sacrifice silences the opposing groups, and both men and mermen, carry Dyesebel towards the hospital. With Dyesebel in critical condition, her human mother, Lucia, made a televised appeal to put an end to the war before there are any more casualties on either side. After an apparent jump in time, Dyesebel was seen swimming in her kingdom and, later, freely walking on land—a sign that a truce between humans and mermaids had finally been reached. Here, she was welcomed by Lucia and Fredo, as well as a little girl who appeared to be her own.

== Cast and characters ==
=== Main cast ===
- Anne Curtis as Dyesebel / Beatriz Reyes
  - Ashley Sarmiento as young Dyesebel / Beatriz Reyes
- Gerald Anderson as Alfredo "Fredo" Montilla
  - Giacobbe Whitworth as young Fredo

=== Supporting cast ===
- Sam Milby as Liro
  - Miguel Vergara as young Liro
- Andi Eigenmann as Betty Reyes
  - Kazumi Porquez as young Betty Reyes
- Dawn Zulueta as Lucia Reyes
- Eula Valdez as Reyna Dyangga
- Zsa Zsa Padilla as Elena "Ena" Villamayor-Montilla
- Gabby Concepcion as Dante Montilla
- Gina Pareño as Stella Villamayor
- Ai-Ai delas Alas as Banak

=== Recurring cast ===
- Bangs Garcia as Prinsesa Coralia
  - Brenna Garcia as young Coralia
- Baron Geisler as Kanor dela Paz
- Ogie Diaz as Tomas
- Nico Antonio as Gorgo
- Bodie Cruz as Rafael Montilla
  - Carlos Dala as young Rafael
- Allan Paule as Menandro
- William Lorenzo as Gobi
- Neil Coleta as Alvin
- Marlann Flores as Sally
- JV Kapunan as David
- David Chua as Octavio
- Erin Ocampo as Yanara
  - Raveena Mansukhani as young Yanara
- Rigor Gorospe as Rigor
- Izzy Canillo as Mako
- CX Navarro as Boying
- Aaliyah Belmoro as Concon
- Kakai Bautista as the voice of Pinky Pusit
- Thou Reyes as the voice of Karlo Kaba-kabayo

=== Guest cast ===
- Bembol Roco as Fabian Reyes
- Jaime Fabregas as Haring Aurelio
- John Regala as Badong Manansala
- Lauren Novero as Hipolonio
- Markki Stroem as Ablon
- Debraliz Borres as Orga
- Lou Veloso as Apoika
- Carlos Morales as Sylvestre
- Froilan Sales as Diego

=== Special participation ===
- Albert Martinez as Prinsipe Tino

== Production ==
In April 2013, the Ravelo family granted ABS-CBN rights to 13 titles and/or characters created by the novelist. The list included "Dyesebel," which aired its pilot episode on March 17, 2014. The family of graphic novelist Mars Ravelo is proud of ABS-CBN's version of "Dyesebel," based on one of the famous characters created by the acknowledged "King of Pinoy Komiks". Dreamscape head, Deo Endrinal, revealed that to make "Dyesebel" more appealing to the new generation of Filipino viewers, they decided to make changes with the approval of the Ravelo family. He said that they did not have a difficult time convincing them to approve of the changes.

Using a technique commonly practiced by advertisers, Endrinal said they went through a "brand essence" exercise to truly understand what makes "Dyesebel" click. This also played a key role in their decision to cast actress-host Anne Curtis to play the iconic mermaid. In the beginning, the name of Anne Curtis surfaced as the lead even before GMA Network bought the rights in 2008. Edrinal explained that they actually had to go through a survey and Curtis was the people's choice to portray the 7th Dyesebel.

During filming of the series on April 3, 2014, Anne Curtis was stung by a box jellyfish and had to be rushed to the hospital.

== Music ==
On April 14, 2014, Star Music officially released the "Dyesebel The Official Soundtrack" and is available in physical and digital formats in various music stores. Broadway actress and The Voice of the Philippines coach Lea Salonga had her own version of the Dyesebel theme song, Tangi Kong Kailangan. According to Dreamscape head, Deo Endrinal, Salonga will also be recording the soap's theme song with ABS-CBN Philharmonic Orchestra, in addition to the one performed by Yeng Constantino. Anne Curtis said she also wanted to sing the theme song, but she is contented to have a song in the official soundtrack.

=== Track listing ===
No.	Title	Artist(s)	Length
1.	"Intro Overture"	ABS-CBN Philharmonic Orchestra	1:03
2.	"Tangi Kong Kailangan"	Lea Salonga & ABS-CBN Philharmonic Orchestra	4:22
3.	"Magkaiba Man Ang Ating Mundo"	Jed Madela	3:57
4.	"Puwang Sa Puso (Main Version)"	Juris	3:44
5.	"‘Pag Kasama Kita"	Anne Curtis	3:29
6.	"Outro Overture"	ABS-CBN Philharmonic Orchestra	1:25
7.	"Tangi Kong Kailangan (Pop Version)"	Yeng Constantino	4:15
8.	"Puwang Sa Puso (Lullaby Version)"	Juris	3:50
9.	"All I Need (Tangi Kong Kailangan English Version)"	Lea Salonga & ABS-CBN Philharmonic Orchestra	4:22
10.	"Tangi Kong Kailangan (Karaoke Version)"	Lea Salonga & ABS-CBN Philharmonic Orchestra	4:22
11.	"Magkaiba Man Ang Ating Mundo (Karaoke Version)"	Jed Madela	3:57
12.	"Puwang Sa Puso (Karaoke Version)"	Juris	3:44
13.	"‘Pag Kasama Kita (Karaoke Version)"	Anne Curtis	3:29
14.	"Tangi Kong Kailangan (Karaoke Pop Version)"	Yeng Contantino	4:15

== Series finale ==
The show was originally planned to have 185 episodes, and was originally set to run until November 2014. However, it ended on July 18, 2014, with only 88 episodes produced, and 87 were aired (two produced episodes were merged into a single special for the series finale). Two episodes were pre-empted in observance of the Lenten season.

== See also ==
- List of programs broadcast by ABS-CBN
- List of ABS-CBN Studios original drama series
