= At Home Ka Dito =

Philippine lifestyle TV program

- Genre: Lifestyle
- Created by: ABS-CBN Studios
- Presented by: Charlene Gonzales
- Country of origin: Philippines
- Original language: Filipino
- No. of episodes: 184

Production
- Running time: 30–40 minutes

Original release
- Network: ABS-CBN
- Release: February 8, 2004 – August 12, 2007

At Home Ka Dito (English: you're at home over here) is a Philippine lifestyle program on ABS-CBN. It aired from February 8, 2004, to August 12, 2007. The show is hosted by former Miss Philippines (Universe 1994) Charlene Gonzales-Muhlach with the addition to the show, actress-comedian Eugene Domingo and Pokwang replacing Joross Gamboa and Roxanne Guinoo.

== Theme and format ==
"BAHAY at BUHAY" was the operative phrase for the show which had makeovers as its core component. At Home Ka Dito takes the makeover to the next phase as it marries home makeover with a life-changing makeover: a makeover that goes beyond the physical. The show is funky and serious, fun and emotional — a blend of laughter and tears.

Each episode tells a story about a celebrity needing a makeover of any space in their home (or anyone related to her) and, in return for the space makeover mission that the show will conduct, the celebrity agrees to do a charitable work for a person who is going through a hard time that the celebrity can relate to or be of assistance.

Charlene Gonzalez anchors the show. Every episode kicks off with Charlene meeting Eugene Domingo to discuss the makeover mission for the day. They proceed to the celebrity's place. The teen pair is left to do the makeover with the aid of guest experts (for example, interior designers) and movers. They get to participate in the fun part of makeover activities (craft, carpentry, etc.) and impart practical tips to viewers. As this unfolds in real-time, Charlene tags along with the celebrity to meet the chosen person who needs their help. They go through a step-by-step solution to the chosen person's problem (the range is wide: issues like dealing with teenage pregnancy, sibling rivalry, generation gap, insecurity, coping with the burden of being a breadwinner, etc.). The intercutting follow-through of the progress of the home and life-changing makeovers. This culminates with a series of heart-rending reveals of surprises (mostly of wish-fulfillment related to the needs of the case study ex. Kabuhayan Showcase) for the chosen person as they arrive at a solution. The celebrity is then surprised with the space makeover output and the episode ends on a feel-good note.

== Hosts ==
=== Main host ===
- Charlene Gonzales

=== Co-hosts ===
- Eugene Domingo
- Pokwang
- Roxanne Guinoo
- Joross Gamboa

== Awards ==
- 2004, 2005 and 2007 PMPC Star Awards for TV's "Best Lifestyle Program"
- 2004 and 2005 PMPC Star Awards for TV's "Best Lifestyle Program Host" (Charlene Gonzales)

== See also ==
- List of programs broadcast by ABS-CBN
