= Dyesebel =

- The original depiction of Dyesebel created by Mars Ravelo.

Publication information
- Publisher: Pilipino Komiks
- First appearance: Pilipino Komiks #1 (1952)
- Created by: Mars Ravelo

In-story information
- Species: Half-human/Half-Atlantican
- Place of origin: Atlantica (Earth)
- Team affiliations: Darna
- Partnerships: Fredo
- Abilities: Able to live on or under the sea; Hydrokinesis; Telepathic control of all aquatic life; Hypnotic Voice; Ultrasonic Scream; Echolocation

Dyesebel (Tagalog pronunciation: [ˌdʒɛː.sɛˈbɛl]) is a Filipino comic book character, conceived by Mars Ravelo and drawn by Elpidio Torres. Dyesebel is a mermaid, who eventually gains full human form through a deal with a sea-witch.

Aside appearing in Pilipino Komiks, Dyesebel also appeared in Kampeon Komiks (Champion Comics) in 1975. The story has been adapted into five films and a spin-off, throughout the timeline from 1953 to 1996. Among those who took on the role in the big screen are Eva Montes, Edna Luna (1953), Vilma Santos (1973), Alma Moreno (1978), Alice Dixson (1990), and Charlene Gonzales (1996). On the television, the iconic mermaid is portrayed by Marian Rivera (2008) and Anne Curtis (2014).

== Adaptations ==
=== Films ===
Title	Cast	Producer	Director	Release date
Dyesebel	Edna Luna as Dyesebel; Jaime de la Rosa as Fredo	Manuel Vistan Jr. Production; Premiere Productions	Gerardo de León	July 4, 1953
Anak ni Dyesebel	Eva Montes as Alona; Edna Luna as Dyesebel; Jaime de la Rosa as Fredo	People's Pictures	Gerardo de León	March 1, 1964
Dyesebel	Vilma Santos as Dyesebel; Romeo Miranda as Fredo	Tagalog Ilang-Ilang Productions	Emmanuel H. Borlaza	June 17, 1973
Dyesebel	Alma Moreno as Dyesebel; Mat Ranillo III as David and Maro	Sampaguita Pictures	Anthony Taylor	October 13, 1978
Dyesebel	Alice Dixson as Dyesebel; Richard Gomez as Edward; Carmina Villarroel as young Dyesebel	Regal Films	Mel Chionglo	January 18, 1990
Dyesebel	Charlene Gonzales as Dyesebel; Matthew Mendoza as Fredo	Viva Films	Emmanuel Borlaza	January 4, 1996

=== Television series ===
==== Mars Ravelo's Dyesebel (2008) ====
The first TV series adaptation of Dyesebel was broadcast on GMA Network in 2008. It originally aired on April 28, 2008, and ended on October 17, 2008, completing 125 episodes. It is top billed by Marian Rivera and Dingdong Dantes in the lead roles. It was internationally aired on GMA Pinoy TV, which became a huge success to viewers abroad.

==== Upcoming Dyesebel television series ====
On December 11, 2022, it was confirmed by comedian Ogie Diaz that Andrea Brillantes has been cast in the role of Dyesebel for an upcoming television series from ABS-CBN Corporation, Francine Diaz to play an antagonist role of Betty.

== On-screen actresses and actors ==
Dyesebel through the years: Edna Luna (1953), Vilma Santos-Recto (1973), Alma Moreno (1978), Alice Dixson (1990), Charlene Gonzales-Muhlach (1996), Marian Rivera-Dantes (2008), and Anne Curtis-Heussaff (2014).

In the films, Dyesebel was portrayed by Filipino actresses: Edna Luna, Vilma Santos, Alma Moreno, Alice Dixson, and Charlene Gonzales. In television, she was portrayed by Marian Rivera in 2008 and Anne Curtis in 2014. She was also personified by the actress Ara Mina in a cameo appearance on Mars Ravelo's Darna (2005 TV Series).

=== Official list of actresses who played Dyesebel ===
No.	Actress	Role	Title	Year
1	Edna Luna	Dyesebel	Dyesebel; Anak ni Dyesebel	1953; 1964
2	Vilma Santos-Recto	Dyesebel	Dyesebel	1973
3	Alma Moreno	Dyesebel	Dyesebel	1978
4	Alice Dixson	Dyesebel	Dyesebel	1990
5	Charlene Gonzales-Muhlach	Dyesebel	Dyesebel	1996
6	Marian Rivera-Dantes	Dyesebel / Isabel	Mars Ravelo's Dyesebel	2008
7	Anne Curtis-Heussaff	Dyesebel / Beatriz	Mars Ravelo's Dyesebel	2014

Young Dyesebel

- Carissa in Dyesebel (1978).
- Carmina Villarroel in Dyesebel (1990).
- Charina Scott in Dyesebel (1996).
- Kirsten Jane Sigrist in Dyesebel (2008 TV series).
- Ashley Sarmiento in Dyesebel (2014 TV series).

Cameo Appearance

- Ara Mina in Mars Ravelo's Darna (2005 TV Series).

=== Official list of actors who played Fredo ===
No.	Actor	Role	Title	Year
1	Jaime dela Rosa	Fredo	Dyesebel; Anak ni Dyesebel	1953; 1964
2	Romeo Miranda	Fredo	Dyesebel at Ang Mahiwagang Kabibe	1973
3	Matt Ranillo III	Fredo (renamed David)	Sisid, Dyesebel, Sisid	1978
4	Richard Gomez	Fredo (renamed Edward)	Dyesebel	1990
5	Matthew Mendoza	Fredo	Dyesebel	1996
6	Dingdong Dantes	Fredo	Mars Ravelo's Dyesebel (2008 TV series)	2008
7	Gerald Anderson	Fredo	Mars Ravelo's Dyesebel (2014 TV series)	2014

Young Fredo

- Robert Ortega in Dyesebel (1990) (renamed Edward)
- Arkin Luciano Magalona in Dyesebel (2008 TV series).
- Giacobbe Whitworth in Dyesebel (2014 TV series).

=== Official list of actresses who played Betty ===
No.	Actor	Role	Title	Year
1	Carol Varga	Betty	Dyesebel; Anak ni Dyesebel	1953; 1964
2	Christina Reyes	Betty	Dyesebel at Ang Mahiwagang Kabibe	1973
3	Raquel Monteza	Betty (renamed Marilen)	Sisid, Dyesebel, Sisid	1978
4	Nadia Montenegro	Betty (renamed Malou)	Dyesebel	1990
5	Kristine Garcia	Betty	Dyesebel	1996
6	Bianca King-Wintle	Betty	Mars Ravelo's Dyesebel (2008 TV series)	2008
7	Andi Eigenmann	Betty	Mars Ravelo's Dyesebel (2014 TV series)	2014

Young Betty

- Kazumi Porquez in Dyesebel (2014 TV series).

== Collected editions ==
Title	Volume	Issue	Date
Dyesebel	Pilipino Komiks	#1	April 11, 1953
Dyesebel	Pilipino Komiks	#26	
Dyesebel	Pilipino Komiks	#141	October 25, 1952
Dyesebel	Pilipino Komiks	#151	March 14, 1953
Dyesebel	Pilipino Komiks	#154	April 25, 1953
Dyesebel	Pilipino Komiks	#158	June 20, 1953
Golden Anniversary	Pilipino Komiks	#2752	
Dyesebel	Espesyal Komiks	#9	February 9, 1953
Anak ni Dyesebel	Liwayway (1963–1964)	#4	

== See also ==
- Panday (comics)
- Zuma (comics)
- Philippine mythical creatures
