= Pamintuan Mansion =

Mansion and museum in Angeles, Pampanga

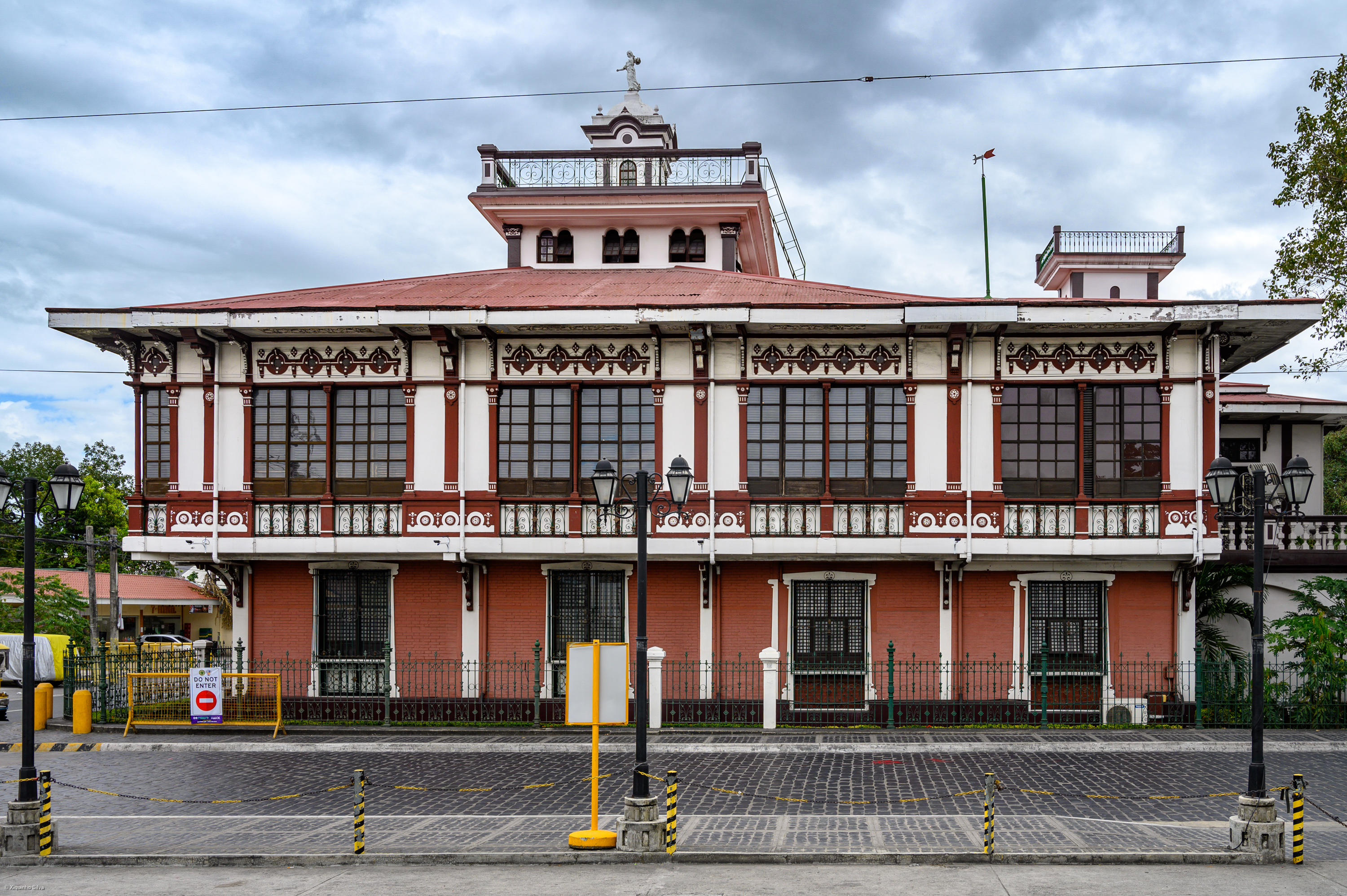
- Etymology: Pamintuan family

General information
- Status: Completed
- Type: Mansion
- Location: Angeles City, Philippines
- Coordinates: 15°08′09″N 120°35′29″E
- Current tenants: National Historical Commission of the Philippines
- Completed: 1890

Technical details
- Floor count: 2

The Pamintuan Mansion is a historic building in Angeles City, Pampanga built by the Pamintuan family in the 1880s. It was briefly used by the Katipunan during the Philippine-American War. It currently hosts a social science museum.

== History ==
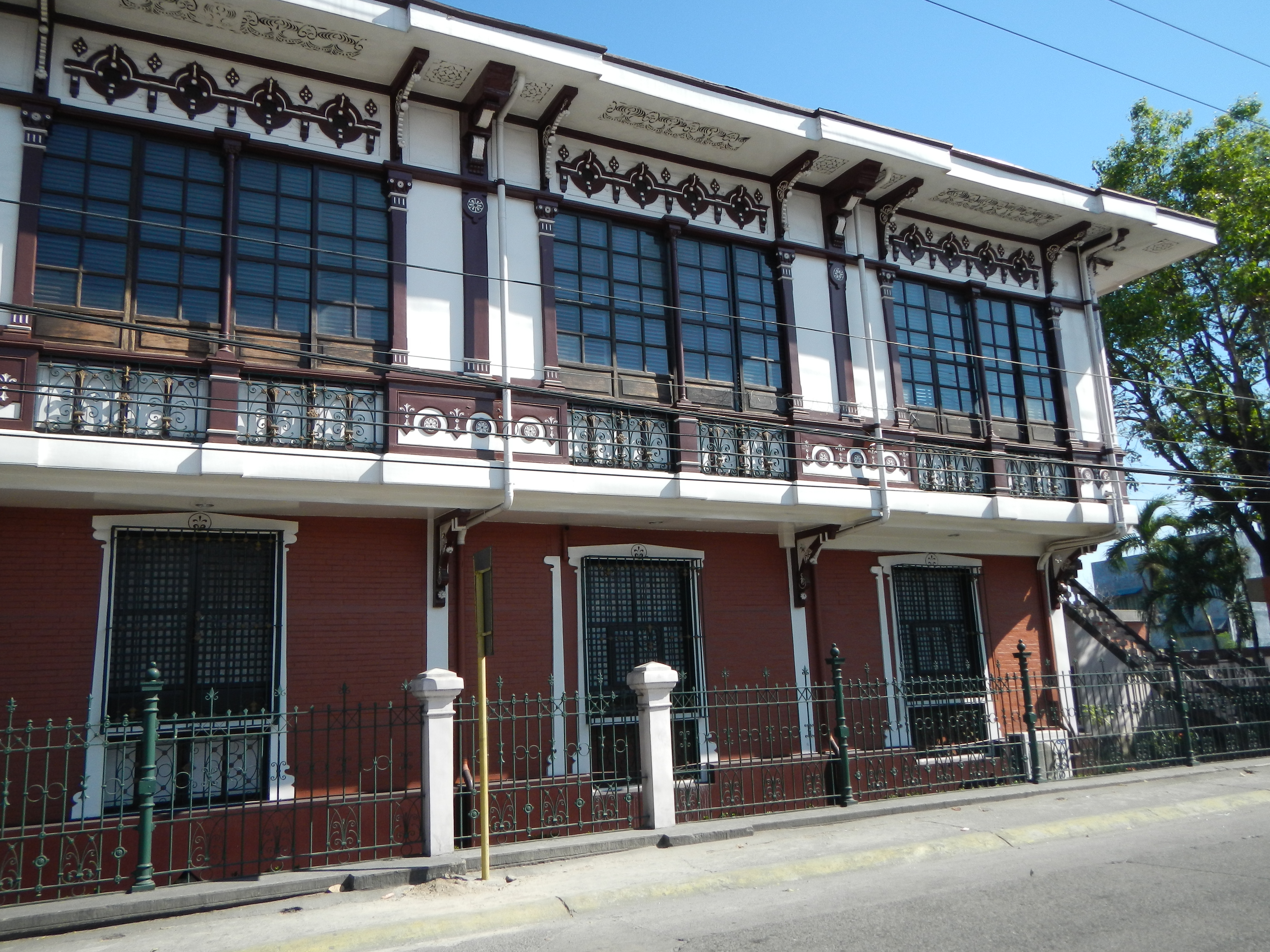
The mansion in 2014

The Pamintuan Mansion was built in 1890 by Mariano Pamintuan and Valentina Torres as a wedding gift to their son Florentino, who later became mayor of Angeles during the American colonial era.

It was also briefly used as a site of the Katipunan during the Philippine-American War. It was used as a headquarters by Gen. Antonio Luna and was also the seat of government of the First Philippine Republic after Gen. Emilio Aguinaldo moved the capital of the from Kawit, Cavite to Pampanga. The Pamintuan Mansion was also the site of the first anniversary of the declaration of Philippine Independence on June 12, 1899, where Aguinaldo personally waved the Philippine flag from the second-floor balcony of the house. By November 1899 fell under American control and was used as a headquarters of Gen. Douglas MacArthur.

During the Japanese occupation of the Philippines of World War II, the Japanese Imperial forces took control of the mansion. After the war, the building was used as a clubhouse of the United Services Organization in 1946 and in 1949 the building was repurposed as a hotel. The Pamintuans sold the building in 1959 to Pedro Tablante, and the Angeles local government leased the property until 1964.

The Bangko Sentral ng Pilipinas, the Philippine central bank, bought the building in 1981 and hosted a satellite office inside the building from 1993 to 2009. The building was then turned over to the National Historical Commission of the Philippines on June 17, 2010, and was converted to a social science museum.

== Museum ==
The Pamintuan Mansion is the site of the Museum of Philippine Social History (Filipino: Museo ng Kasaysayang Panlipunan ng Pilipinas) since 2015. It is reportedly the first social history museum in the Philippines. While other museums in the country dedicated to historical figures and events, the Pamintuan museum showcases the Filipino social life covering various aspects such as traditional clothing, games, music, trade, and culinary arts.
