= 2021 in Philippine music =

The following is a list of events and releases that have happened or are expected to happen in 2021 in music in the Philippines.

== Notable events ==
- January 25 – Pop rock band The Juans debuted at number 9 on weekly Billboard's Next Big Sound Chart.
- February 22 – Boy band Alamat debuted at number 2 on weekly Billboard's Next Big Sound Chart.
- April 30 – Boy band SB19 earns a nomination for Top Social Artist at the 2021 Billboard Music Awards, becoming the first Filipino (and Southeast Asian) act to be nominated for a Billboard Music Award in the United States.
- April–May – "Binibini", a song by male artist Zack Tabudlo, made into the top of local Spotify Philippines charts.
- May 11 – Boy band BGYO debuted at number 2 on weekly Billboard's Next Big Sound Chart.
- August 24 – Boy band BGYO re-entered at number 1 on weekly Billboard's Next Big Sound Chart, becoming the first Filipino act to do so.
- December 23 – R&B band South Border reunited with past and current members Jay Durias, Luke Mejares, and Duncan Ramos in the first live concert in the country since the COVID-19 pandemic at the Mall of Asia Arena.
- December 26 – alternative rock band UDD vocalist and keyboard Armi Millare has left from the band after 17 years.

== Debuting acts ==
=== Bands ===
- 10 a.m. Departure
- 1096 Gang
- 8 Ballin'
- Alamat
- Bini
- BGYO
- Blaster and the Celestial Klowns
- Daydream
- Def Jam Rekognize All-Stars
- Deuces
- KAIA
- Lapis
- LITZ
- Luna
- polar
- Press Hit Play
- P:6
- R Rules
- Suzara

=== Solo artists ===
- Ace Banzuelo
- Adie
- Angela Ken
- Belle Mariano
- BEY
- BLASTER
- Chen (Chen Pangan of Unit 406)
- Claudine Co
- Dia Maté
- Diego Gutierrez
- DJ Loonyo
- Ez Mil
- FELIP (Ken of SB19)
- Leann Ganzon
- Michael Pacquiao
- Nonoy Peña
- Sam Cruz
- Kim Nemenzo
- Muri
- Huhsmile
- Paul Pablo
- Fana
- Nobrvnd
- Raven (Raven Aviso)
- Rienne
- Gigi De Lana
- jikamarie
- Meowfie
- Mizael
- ISSA (Issa Pressman)
- Young Cocoa

== Reunion/Comebacks ==
- Munimuni

== On hiatus ==
- Route 83

== Released in 2021 ==
=== First quarter ===
==== January ====
Date	Single / Album	Artist(s)	Genre(s)	Label(s)	Reference
8	Beautiful Day	Alisson Shore, Mike Swift, Kiyo, D-Coy	Hip hop, rap	Def Jam Philippines	
9	Pajama Party	1096 Gang (feat. Ghuddist, Young Wise, Polo Pi, Ghetto Gecko and Luci J)	Hip hop, rap	Independent	
11	Our Love	Garett Bolden	Pop	GMA Music	
14	Kapiling	Meowfie	Classical	Independent	
17	Maga Ako Manas Ako	Eydie Waw feat. The Wawettes	Pop, Filipino novelty song	Star Music	
22	Kwentuhan	Autotelic	Indie rock, alternative	MCA Music	
22	Nagmamahal Din Lang	Karl Zarate	Pop	Ivory Music	
22	Pwede Na Ba	KVN	R&B, soul	Old School Music	
22	internet famous	Aidan Bernales	Pop	Independent	
29	The Light	BGYO	Pop, pop-punk, EDM & hip hop	Star Music	
29	Bagong Simula	Jem Macatuno	Pop	Star Music	
29	Connected na Tayo	Jem Macatuno, Shawntel, Lie Reposposa	Pop	Star Music	
29	Ikaw, Ako, Tayo	Kiara	Pop	Star Music	
29	Kaibigan Ko	Lie Reposposa	Pop	Star Music	
29	Pop Goes My Pretty Big Heart	Shawntel	Pop	Star Music	
29	SODA	James Reid	Pop, electro-funk	Careless Music	
29	Crash Landing	BEY	Pop	Universal Records	
29	Pricey	P:6	Hip hop, rap	Universal Records	
29	Got Nothin' to Do	Reon	Indie pop	Warner Music Philippines	
29	You're Still the One	Nonoy Peña	Pop	Ivory Music	
30	Ako Muna	Luna	P-pop, R&B/soul	Independent	

==== February ====
Date	Single / Album	Artist(s)	Genre(s)	Label(s)	Reference
1	Ballin'	Paul N Ballin (feat. Flow G)	Pop	Rawstarr Records	
4	Oras	I Belong to the Zoo	Indie rock, alternative	Independent	
5	On a Dream	Diego Gutierrez	Pop	Hitmakers Entertainment	
5	Tawid	Cheats	Indie rock, alternative	Independent	
10	Kyusi	Zild	Indie pop	Warner Music Philippines	
12	Ikaw Na Sana	Julian Trono, Ella Cruz	Pop	Viva Records	
12	Ready (EP)	Issa Rodriguez	Indie pop	Mustard Music	
12	Walang Kapantay	The Knobs	Indie pop	Universal Records	
12	Bank Holiday	Glaiza de Castro	Indie pop	O/C Records	
12	Pag-Ibig Lang Ba	Oh, Flamingo!	Indie rock, alternative	Sony Music Philippines	
12	Stuck in the Friendzone	Leann Ganzon	Pop	Ivory Music	
14	kbye	Alamat	Dance-pop	Viva Records	
14	Nang Dumating Ka	Bandang Lapis	Adult Alternative	Viva Records	
14	Inevitable	Ben&Ben	Folk	Sony Music Philippines	
14	Para Sayo (EP)	Quest	Hip hop, rap	Warner Music Philippines	
14	Waiting For Your Words	Soft Pillow Kisses	Indie pop	Independent	
16	Good Boys	Wonggoys	Folk, bisrock	22 Tango Music Group	
19	Phoenix	Morissette	Pop	Underdog Music Philippines	
19	Huwag Kang Mangamba	Angeline Quinto	Pop	Star Music	
19	Halong	Sud	Indie rock, alternative	Warner Music Philippines	
19	Poot at Pag-ibig	Gloc-9	Hip hop, rap	Independent	
19	Static Electricity Dreams of Longevity	Carousel Casualties	Indie rock, alternative	Warner Music Philippines	
19	Buhay Ay Langit	Conscious & The Goodness	Indie rock, alternative	Independent	
19	To Tell The Tale; Constellation	Createurs	Indie rock, alternative	Absence Recordings	
19	Historical	Pinkmen	Indie rock, alternative	Offshore Music	
19	Heaven is a Long Exhale	The Buildings	Indie rock, alternative	Independent	
19	Takipsilim	Rachel Alejandro	Pop	Rebel Records Philippines	
19	Take It or Leave It	Timothy Run	Indie pop	Sony Music Philippines	
19	Kung Ang Puso	Unit 406	Alternative, rock	MCA Music	
19	Feel Alive	Joey Tha Boy (ft. Paolo Sandejas)	Hip hop, rap	Mustard Music	
24	24	TALA	Pop	Universal Records	
24	MTM (Magkakasama Tayong Muli)	Suzara	Pop	Sony Music Philippines	
25	Apat	Zild	Indie pop	Warner Music Philippines	
26	Bandang Lapis Acoustic (EP)	Bandang Lapis	Adult Alternative	Viva Records	
26	Anumang Dulo	CJ Navato	Pop	Ivory Music	
26	Ikaw	Shanti Dope (ft. Pino G, Jobe Nkemakolam)	Hip hop, rap	Universal Records	
26	Whatever This Is	Fern.	Pop	Island Records Philippines	
26	Bangin	Paul Pablo	Pop, Visayan Pop	Warner Music Philippines	
26	Komplikado	KVN	R&B, Soul	Old School Records	

==== March ====
Date	Single / Album	Artist(s)	Genre(s)	Label(s)	Reference
1	Secret Avengers	Six the Northstar (ft. Liquid, Lloyd, Raw Meta Fuego, Ninno)	Hip hop, rap	Independent	
3	Lost With You	Maine Mendoza	Pop	Universal Records	
3	Parasyut	Meowfie	Pop	Independent	
3	All That	Ylona Garcia	Pop	88rising, Paradise Rising	
4	LDR	We Got	Reggae	Sony Music Philippines	
5	Gabay	KZ Tandingan	Filipino Disney	Walt Disney Records	
5	Muling Maramdaman (EP); Saranggola	Dan Ombao	Pensive Ballad, pop	Star Music	
5	Ako Naman Muna	Angela Ken	Pop	Star Music	
5	Backhouse Ballin	Manila Grey (ft. James Reid)	Pop, Motown	1Z Co. Recordings	
5	Atin Ang Gabi	Def Jam Recognize (Legit Misfitz, Al James, K24/7, Calvin de Leon)	Hip hop, rap	Def Jam Philippines	
5	A Day at a Time	Clara Benin (with Gentle Bones)	Indie pop	Cross Ratio Entertainment	
5	Talk! Talk!	Ena Mori	Indie pop	Offshore Music	
5	Out of His Head	Sepia Times	Indie pop	Sony Music Philippines	
5	Ang Rosas	Rob Deniel	Rock	Viva Records	
8	Ako Muna	Lance Busa	Pinoy Ballad, pop	Star Music	
9	What?	SB19	Pinoy pop	Sony Music Philippines	
17	Edi Wag	Zae	Hip hop/Rap	Independent	
19	Higad Girl	Vice Ganda	Pop	Viva Records	
19	Musings (EP)	Kurei	Pop	Universal Records	
19	Di Sinasadya	Selena Marie	Pinoy pop	PolyEast Records	
25	With You	Suzara	Pop	Sony Music Philippines	
26	Binibini	Zack Tabudlo	Pop	Island Records Philippines	
30	What Is This Feeling?	Reese Lansangan	Indie pop	Soon the Moon	

=== Second quarter ===
==== April ====
Date	Single / Album	Artist(s)	Genre(s)	Label(s)	Reference
1	Rosario (EP)	Honcho	Hip hop, rap	Ex Battalion Music Entertainment	
5	Yearly	Ex Battalion	Hip hop, rap	Ex Battalion Music Entertainment	
9	House of Tears	Diego Gutierrez	Pop	Universal Records	
9	Dance Under the Sun	DJ Loonyo	Hip hop, rap	Universal Records	
9	Mahina	Marlo Mortel	Pop	PolyEast Records	
9	Lovin' Tonight	Deuces	Indie pop	PolyEast Records	
9	Just Like Manny P	Jelo Acosta	Hip hop, rap	Independent	
9	Angel Baby	Gibbs (ft. Moophs)	Indie pop	Tarsier Records	
9	Mayari	Ace Banzuelo	Pop	Sony Music Philippines	
9	Huminga	Zild	Indie pop	Warner Music Philippines	
9	Otbura	Crazymix	Hip hop, rap	Ivory Music	
	Pagbigkas	dicta license	Nu metal	Warner Music	
11	You Rock	Matthaios (ft. Michael Pacquiao)	Hip hop, rap	Midas Records	
15	Interim	Gabba	Indie rock, post-rock	Independent	
15	Fifty-Four (EP)	Underclass	Indie pop	Independent	
16	Sana'y Alam Mo	Chen	Pop	MCA Music	
16	Nite N' Day (EP)	Def Jam REKOGNIZE All-Stars	Hip hop, rap	Def Jam Philippines	
16	Why Don't We Linger?	Ysanygo	Indie pop	Independent	
16	Galit	Oh, Flamingo!	Indie rock, alternative	Sony Music Philippines	
16	occult	Aidan Bernales	Pop	Independent	
17	Pwede Ba	Carissa	Alternative, rock	Tower of Doom	
19	Hangga't Maaari	Flow G, JRoa	R&B/Soul	Viva Records, Ex Battalion Music Entertainment	
21	Stuck On You	Baby Blue	Pop, Hip hop, EDM & P-Pop	HHE, Japan Tower Records	
22	Confession	Hazel Faith	Contemporary Christian	Sony Music Philippines	
23	He's into Her	BGYO	Synth-pop, EDM, Pinoy pop, Pop-punk, Teen pop, Bubblegum pop	Star Music	
23	Bitaw	Sassa Dagdag	Pop	PolyEast Records	
23	Pitik Bulag	Safe	Alternative, rock	PolyEast Records	
26	Stripped Down (EP)	This Band	Pop rock	Viva Records	
26	Ibong Adarna	Flow G (ft. Gloc-9)	R&B/Soul	Viva Records, Ex Battalion Music Entertainment	
30	Kimmi	Kim Chiu, DJ M.O.D	OPM, Dance pop, Visayan Pop	Star Music	
30	Free	Julie Anne San Jose	OPM, pop	Universal Records	
30	The Art of Human (Part 1)	Sepia Times	Indie pop	Sony Music Philippines	
30	Walang Aminan	Huhsmile	Pop	MCA Music	
30	Rosas	Magnus Haven	Pop rock	Blacksheep Records Manila	

==== May ====
Date	Single / Album	Artist(s)	Genre(s)	Label(s)	Reference
5	Yakap	Bernadette Sembrano	Inspirational	Star Music	
7	Fix Me	Jake Zyrus	Pop	Star Music	
7	Midsummer High	Nameless Kids	Indie pop	DNA Music	
7	Upuan	Ben&Ben	Pop	Sony Music Philippines	
10	SRRY	King Badger	R&B, soul	Viva Records, Ex Battalion Music Entertainment	
14	Magpahinga	Ben&Ben	Pop	Sony Music Philippines	
14	About Her Space (EP)	Kakie	Indie pop	Curve Entertainment	
14	Katapusan	Route 83	Pop, Visayan pop	Warner Music Philippines	
14	Sunshine	Juan Caoile, Kyleswish	R&B, soul	Viva Records	
14	Beautiful	Jessica Villarubin	Pop	GMA Music	
14	Sigurado	Belle Mariano	Pop	Star Music	
16	Feel Good Pilipinas	KZ Tandingan and BGYO	Dance pop, Synth pop	Star Music	
16	Mapa	SB19	Pinoy pop	Sony Music Philippines	
19	Drive	December Avenue	Pop	Tower of Doom	
21	Shine – 25th Anniversary Version	Morissette	Indie pop	Star Music	
21	Peekaboo	Shanti Dope (ft. Skinny G)	Hip hop, rap	Universal Records	
21	Train of Thought	Sam Cruz	Pop	Universal Records	
21	Di Kawalan	Maymay Entrata	Pop	Star Music	
21	Ganda Na Sana	ALLMO$T, Juan Caoile	R&B, soul	Viva Records	
21	Pare	Abaddon (feat. Flow G)	Hip hop, rap	Sony Music Philippines	
25	Hannah Precillas Sessions (EP)	Hannah Precillas	Pop	Spotlight Music	
28	R.Y.F.	Catriona Gray	Pop	Star Music	
28	Click, Like, Share (Original Soundtrack) (EP)	Various artists (Angela Ken, Arvey, Kyle Echarri, SAB)	Indie pop	ABS-CBN Film Productions	
28	Tama Na	Darren Espanto	Pop	MCA Music	
28	City of Vulnerability	Gracenote	Pop rock	Universal Records	(Note: The track was originally part of the 2020 album Small World.)
30	Time Well Spent	Reese Lansangan	Indie pop	Soon The Moon	

==== June ====
Date	Single / Album	Artist(s)	Genre(s)	Label(s)	Reference
1	Kapit	Janine Teñoso, MC Einstein	Pop	Viva Records	
4	Kahit 'Di Tayo (EP)	Kritiko	Hip hop	Star Music	
4	Born To Win (Single)	BINI	Dance-pop, EDM, Pinoy pop	Star Music	
4	Feel Good Pilipinas (Extended Remix)	KZ Tandingan and BGYO (remixed by DJ DLS)	Dance-pop, Synth pop	Star Music	
4	Don't Quote Me (EP)	Dia Mate	Pop	Island Records Philippines	
4	Nevermind	BEY	Pop	Universal Records	
4	Gemini	Project Moonman	Indie pop	O/C Records	
4	Wala Ka Nang Magagawa	This Band	Pop rock	Viva Records	
11	Abante	Rob Deniel, ALLMO$T	R&B, soul	Viva Records	
11	Kumapit	Yeng Constantino	Inspirational music, pop-rock	Star Music	
11	Waking Up Next to You	Karylle	Pop	Sony Music Philippines	
11	Renewed (EP)	Hazel Faith	Inspirational, Contemporary Christian	Sony Music Philippines	
11	Kung Hindi Hihindian	Kim Nemenzo	Pop	Sony Music Philippines	
11	Songs From the Shelf (EP)	timothy Run	Indie pop	Sony Music Philippines	
11	Binibini (Last Day on Earth)	Zack Tabudlo (ft. James TW)	Pop	Island Records Philippines	
11	Iwan	Autotelic	Indie rock, alternative	MCA Music	
17	Tibay 'Yan	Inigo Pascual, Alamat	Pop, P-pop	Viva Records	
18	Hello	James Reid	Pop	Careless, Hyphen Music	
18	Epic Plandemic (EP)	Kill the Boredom	Punk rock	Enterphil Entertainment Corporation, Ivory Music	
18	Runnin'	BGYO and Keiko Necesario	Folk-pop, Bluegrass, Hip hop, EDM	Star Music	
18	While We Are Young	BGYO	Soul, Funk, R&B, boogie, post-disco, big band	Star Music	
18	New Views	Kyle Echarri	Pop	Star Music	
18	Know Me	8 Ballin' (feat. R!S, Supboi K, EGO & Ya'akov)	Hip hop, rap	Independent	
18	Kalawakan	Paul Pablo	Pop	Warner Music Philippines	
19	Sana'y Mapasakin	Clien and ALLMO$T (feat. LA GOON$)	R&B, soul	Viva Records	
21	Lagi	Skusta Clee	R&B, soul	Panty Droppaz League	
23	Ate Sandali	Maris Racal	Pop	Sony Music Philippines	
25	Morissette at 14, Vol. 2	Morissette	Pop	Flasher Factory	
25	Options	Iñigo Pascual	Pop	Tarsier Records	
25	KKK (Kasangga, Katuwang, Karamay)	Angela Ken, CLR	Pop	Star Music	
25	Bahagi	Jayda	Pop	Star Music	
25	Sa Panaginip	Katrina Velarde	Pop	Viva Records	
25	Fallen	Lola Amour	Indie, rock	Warner Music Philippines	
25	Legendary	Max Dylan (ft. King Promdi, Akosi Dogie, Jrld M)	Hip hop, rap	Def Jam Philippines	
25	Scenes from Inside	Barbie Almalbis	Pop	Sony Music Philippines	
26	SOON TO BE	Clien and ALLMO$T	R&B, soul	Viva Records	
27	Mapa (Band Version)	SB19, Ben&Ben	Alternative folk	Sony Music Philippines	
29	Saranggola	Juan Caoile, Kraytuss, RK Trap	R&B, soul	Viva Records	
30	Iron Mike	Mike Swift	Alternative rap	Independent	

=== Third quarter ===
==== July ====
Date	Single / Album	Artist(s)	Genre(s)	Label(s)	Reference
2	Kaya Natin 'To	DJ Loonyo (ft. Rockboi)	Hip hop, rap	Universal Records	
2	Pag-Asa	Bandang Lapis, Syd Hartha	Pop, rock	Viva Records	
2	Promise	allen&elle	Indie pop	Tarsier Records	
4	Fourth of July	Leah Halili	Indie, alternative	Independent	
5	Ang Liwanag	Skusta Clee, Magnus Haven	Pop	Viva Records	
7	Vices	Suspiria Pink	Indie rock	Offshore Music	
9	Kwento Sa Silid (EP)	Janine Tenoso	Pop	Viva Records	
9	Pakilala (EP)	Zsaris	Pop	O/C Records	
9	Mashi Baeed	Luka (ft. Nadine Lustre)	R&B, soul	Careless	
9	Tagu-Taguan	Terazza	Pop	Enterphil Entertainment Corporation, Ivory Music	
15	Kasmala	Alamat	Pop	Viva Records	
16	Galakbay	Press Hit Play	Pop	Evosound	
16	Prelude	JMKO	Pop	Star Music	
16	Kagandahan	Fern.	Pop	Island Records Philippines	
16	Bituin	Marlo Mortel	Pinoy pop	PolyEast Records	
16	Anticipation	Leanne & Naara	Indie pop	Warner Music Philippines	
16	Phases Vol. 1	Jensen Gomez	Indie pop	Off the Record, MCA Music	
16	Hiwaga	We Got	Reggae	Sony Music Philippines	
16	Dungaw	Adie	Pop	O/C Records	
17	Saves It	KD Estrada, Loisa Andalio	Pop	Star Music	
17	La Luna	Luna	P-pop	First Label	
21	'Di Panghabang-Buhay	Moira Dela Torre, The Juans	Indie pop	Star Music	
21	Fragile and Human	Gabby Alipe	Pop	Tower of Doom Music	
22	Pagsibol (EP)	SB19	Pinoy pop	Sony Music Philippines	
23	Sunsets and Heaven (EP)	SAB	Indie pop	Star Music	
23	Ako Naman Muna (English Version)	Angela Ken	Indie pop	Star Music	
23	Rezilience	Q-York	Hip hop, rap	Warner Music Philippines	
23	Back to the Times	Reon	Indie pop	Warner Music Philippines	
23	One of the Boys	Aidan Bernales	Pop	Independent	
28	Lonely	Elise Huang	Pop	Island Records Philippines, MCA Music	
29	Jairah	Sponge Cola	Pop	Sony Music Philippines	
30	Pasalubong	Ben&Ben, Moira Dela Torre	Pop	Sony Music Philippines	
30	We R All Delinquents	Delinquent Society	Hip hop, rap	Sony Music Philippines	
30	Tawa-Tawa	Fana	Alternative pop	Star Music	
30	Convalescence (EP)	JM de Guzman	Indie rock	Star Music	
30	Dodong	KZ Tandingan	Pop, Ballad	Star Music	
30	Inday	TJ Monterde	Pop, Ballad	PolyEast Records	
30	Huwag Lang Ikaw	Eevee	Alternative rock	Ivory Music	
30	Mirror	New York Heights	Rock	Enterphil Entertainment Corporation, Ivory Music	
30	Get This Bread (EP)	Nobrvnd	Pop	Warner Music Philippines	
30	Hungover	Gin Rum and Truth	Rock	Warner Music Philippines	
30	Thunder	Muri	Indie pop	Warner Music Philippines	
30	Museo	Curtismith	Alternative rap	Pool Records	
30	Farther	polar	Pop	Otacute Philippines	
30	Just Friends	Rienne	Pop	Off the Record, MCA Music	
30	Boston	Juan Karlos	Pop	Island Records Philippines, MCA Music	

==== August ====
Date	Single / Album	Artist(s)	Genre(s)	Label(s)	Reference
6	Dyosa	Kyle Echarri	Pop	Star Music	
6	Selos	Kokoy de Santos	Pop	Star Music	
6	Darling, Darling	Rob Deniel	Pop rock	Viva Records	
6	False Prophets	Patty Tiu	Pop, EDM	O/C Records	
6	WIN	Press Hit Play	Pop	Evolution Media	
6	Bitin	8 Ballin' (feat. R!S, Supboi K, EGO & Ya'akov)	R&B/Soul	Def Jam Philippines, MCA Music	
11	Operation 10–90	Shockra	Hip hop/Rap	Sony Music Philippines	
15	G Wolf	Flow G	Hip hop/Rap	Ex Battalion Music Entertainment	
13	Sugat	Ben&Ben, Munimuni	Pop	Sony Music Philippines, Elesi Studios	
13	Bahala Na	Callalily, This Band	Pop rock	Viva Records, O/C Records	
13	Ok Lang Yan	Isang	Pop	MCA Music	
13	Awit sa Salamin	Sandiwa	Pop rock	Ivory Music	
13	Lalayo Na Lang	EJ de Perio	Pop	Warner Music Philippines	
13	Good Old Days	Quest	Hip hop/Rap	Warner Music Philippines	
13	Suara Hati	Clara Benin	Alternative folk	Offmute, Sony Music Philippines	
18	Unang Sayaw	Nobita	Pop	Sony Music Philippines	
20	The Baddest	BGYO	Pop	Star Music	
20	Signature (EP)	Morissette	Pop	Underdog Music PH, Stages Sessions	
20	Dulo	The Juans	Pop	Viva Records	
20	Ika'y Mahal Pa Rin	SuYo	Pop	Viva Records	
20	Ligaya	Elha Nympha	Pop	MCA Music	
20	Higayon	Soulthrll	Hip hop/Rap	Warner Music Philippines	
20	Sobreng Puti	Bloodflowers	Rock	Enterphil Entertainment Corporation, Ivory Music	
20	In My Imagination	CJ Navato	Pop	Ivory Music	
20	Better Days	Wonggoys	Pop rock, Bisrock	22 Tango Music Group	
20	Virgo	Derrick Monasterio	Pop	GMA Music	
20	In My Mind	Lyn Lapid	Pop	MCA Music	
20	Eto Na (Ang Maliligayang Araw)	Itchyworms	Rock	Sony Music Philippines	
20	Sakay	LOIR	Hip hop/Rap	Sony Music Philippines	
22	Mariposa	Peaceful Gemini (feat. DB Tha Girl)	Hip hop/Rap	Sony Music Philippines	
23	Daybreak (Live)	Leanne & Naara	Pop	Warner Music Philippines	
23	Sandali Lang	Over October	Alternative	Island Records Philippines, MCA Music	
24	One of the Boys	dia maté	Pop	Island Records Philippines, MCA Music	
25	Wake Me Up	One Click Straight	Punk	Island Records Philippines, MCA Music	
25	Darkside	Dello	Hip hop/Rap	Sony Music Philippines	
26	Pag-uwi	Raven	Pop	Sony Music Philippines	
27	Dumaloy	Sud	Indie rock, alternative, Jazz fusion	Warner Music Philippines	
27	i'm just lonely	Aloura, Mikee Misalucha	Pop	Warner Music Philippines	
27	Marry Me, Marry You (Original Soundtrack) (EP)	Various artists (Darren Espanto, KD Estrada, Zephanie, Anji, Angela Ken, SAB)	Indie pop	Star Music	
27	Hangganan	Greyline	Pop rock	Blacksheep Records Manila, Viva Records	
27	Pakay	Julian Trono	Pop	Viva Records	
27	Looping	Fern.	Pop	Island Records Philippines, MCA Music	
27	Lou	No Lore	Alternative	Off the Record, MCA Music	
27	Changes	P:6 (feat. Sam Cruz)	Hip hop/Rap	Universal Records	
27	Alaala	Drei Raña	Pop	PolyEast Records	
27	Pundasyon	ConStruck Music	Hip hop/Rap	ConStruck Music, Ivory Music	
29	Pebble House Vol. 1: Kuwaderno	Ben&Ben	Pop	Sony Music Philippines	
29	lutang	Jikamarie	R&B/Soul	Warner Music Philippines	
31	OH	1st.One	Pop	1st.One Entertainment	

==== September ====
Date	Single / Album	Artist(s)	Genre(s)	Label(s)	Reference
3	I Need You Now	Kyle Juliano (feat. Sam Akins)	Pop	Universal Records	
3	Can I	Alisah Bonaobra, Bugoy Drilon	Pop	RJA Productions	
4	The One	SB19	Pop	Sony Music Philippines	
5	Paraiso	Jamir Garcia	Rock	Balcony Entertainment	
8	Awit ng Misyon	Jamie Rivera	Contemporary Christian	Star Music	
8	Kama	Marion Aunor	Pop	Wild Dream Records, Viva Records	
9	Oh, Bleeding Hearts?	Ena Mori	Pop	Offshore Music	
10	Crazy	James Reid	Pop	Careless, Hyphen Music	
10	Kapit Lang	BINI	P-pop	Star Music	
10	Agwat	Cha-Cha Cañete	Indie pop	Star Music	
10	Walang Pipigil	Matt Lozano	Pop	GMA Music	
10	Adhikain	Pow Chavez, Jmakata	Hip hop	FlipMusic Records, Viva Records	
10	ANOONA	Karencitta (feat. Nik Makino, Cursebox)	R&B/Soul	Lorega Amo, Viva Records	
10	Dreamwalker	Fern.	Pop	Island Records Philippines, MCA Music	
10	Phases Vol. 2 (EP)	Jensen Gomez	Alternative	Off The Record, MCA Music	
14	Don't Go Changing	Ylona Garcia	Pop	88rising, Paradise Rising	
15	Asa Naman	Maris Racal	Pop	Balcony Entertainment, Sony Music Philippines	
17	Habang Buhay	Zack Tabudlo	Pop	Island Records Philippines, MCA Music	
17	Palitaw	Edray Teodoro	Pop	MCA Music	
17	Shoes Out The Door! (EP)	Nameless Kids	Indie pop	DNA Music	
18	Palayo	Felip	Pop	Interstreet Recordings	
19	Anino ng Kahapon	LOIR	Alternative	Sony Music Philippines	
22	Wala Na Akong Pera	Tubero	Grindcore	Tower of Doom	
23	Inutil	Madam Inutz	Novelty, pop	Independent	
24	Puso at Diskarte	ASTRO, Layzie Fu, Mike Kosa, D-Coy, Pricetagg, Honcho, Zargon	Hip hop, rap	Def Jam Philippines, MCA Music	
24	Bagong Buhay Volume 1	Thyro Alfaro	Pop	Diwang Records, Viva Records	
24	Lonta	Just Hush	R&B/Soul	DRP Records, Viva Records	
24	Linya	Huhsmile	Pop	MCA Music	
24	Am I Enough	ST. WOLF	Alternative	Warner Music Philippines	
24	Gusto Ko Nang Bumitaw	Sheryn Regis	Pop	Star Music	
24	Dream Maker (EP)	Lian Kyla	Indie pop	Star Music	
24	Pack of Make-Believe (EP)	10 a.m. Departure	Rock	Island Records Philippines, MCA Music	
29	Alamat (Mobile Legends: Bang Bang Anniversary Theme Song)	Sponge Cola	Rock	Sony Music Philippines	
30	You Took My Heart	Lili	Indie pop	Sony Music Philippines	
30	DISKO FOREVER (Japanese Version)	BLASTER	Funk-rock	Island Records Philippines, MCA Music	

=== Fourth-quarter ===
==== October ====
Date	Single / Album	Artist(s)	Genre(s)	Label(s)	Reference
1	Hanggang sa Langit	Shane Dandan	Pop	Viva Records	
1	Pagsamo	Arthur Nery	Pop	Viva Records	
1	Anghel	The Juans	Pop rock	Viva Records	
1	Kulay (Miss Universe Philippines 2021)	BGYO	Pinoy pop	Star Music	
1	Loaded	Shanti Dope (feat. Hellmerry)	Hip hop/Rap	Universal Records	
4	semilucent 2 (EP)	Paradise Rising	R&B, soul	88rising Paradise Rising	
5	Maybe Today, Maybe Tomorrow (EP)	Over October	Pop, indie/alternative	Island Records Philippines, MCA Music	
7	The Light (Album)	BGYO	P-pop	Star Music	
7	Ngayon Lang 'To	Raven	Pop	Sony Music Philippines	
8	Sakalam	Gigi de Lana	Pop	Star Music	
8	Ebeb	Flow G	Pop	Ex Battalion Music Entertainment	
8	Marilag	Press Hit Play (feat. CHRLS and Zi.O)	P-pop	Evolution Media	
8	Love Language	Catriona	Pop	Warner Music Philippines	
8	Tulog Na	Muri	Pop	Warner Music Philippines	
8	TOTGA	Timmy Albert	Pop	Universal Records	
8	Infinite Afternoon	Motherbasss	Electronic	Plural Music	
14	Sangkap ng Pasko	Madam Inutz	Novelty, Christmas	Independent	
14	Born to Win (Album)	BINI	P-pop	Star Music	
15	Episode	Zack Tabudlo	Pop, Alternative	Island Records Philippines, MCA Music	
15	Zesto	Young Cocoa	Pop	Offmute, Sony Music Philippines	
15	Lason	JRLDM	Hip hop, rap	Warner Music Philippines, Music Colony Records	
15	Nevermind	Tala	Pop	Universal Records	
17	Love Together, Hope Together	Various artists	Christmas	GMA Music	
19	SMS	Because	R&B, soul	Viva Records	
19	Love Me Too	Elise Huang	Pop	Island Records Philippines, MCA Music	
20	Di Na Ma-iisa	Nobita	Pop	Sony Music Philippines	
22	11:59	KZ Tandingan	Pop	Tarsier Records	
22	AMAKABOGERA	Maymay Entrata	Pop	Star Pop	
22	Sigaw ng Puso	Erik Santos	Pop, Ballad	Star Music	
22	porque	Alamat	P-pop	Viva Records	
22	Love is A Promise	Down by 18	Pop rock	Viva Records	
22	Wag Kang Aalis	Ice Seguerra	Pop	Universal Records	
22	Phases (EP)	Hannah Pangilinan	Pop	Universal Records	
22	Cruel House	Kemrie Barcenas	Pop	Universal Records	
22	Katulad	Hero, Yuri Dope, KXLE	Hip hop/Rap	Universal Records	
22	CHANGIN' Vol. 1	of Mercury	R&B, soul	Sony Music Philippines	
22	Gabi	Keiko Necesario	Pop	Warner Music Philippines	
24	Reality Checklist	Unique	Soul	O/C Records	
27	Hakbang	Cheats	Alternative	Island Records Philippines; MCA Music	
28	Waterwalk	Morissette	Contemporary Christian	Waterwalk Records; Sony Music Philippines	
28	Sunchild	Lili	Indie/Alternative	Sony Music Philippines	
29	The Great OPM Songbook, Vol. 1	Rachel Alejandro	Pop	Star Music	
29	K1N5E	Six Part Invention	Pop	Star Music	
29	Unang Hakbang	Lian Kyla	Indie pop	Star Music	
29	Sugal	DIONELA	Pop	MCA Music	
29	DISKO FOREVER (Tagalog Version)	BLASTER	Funk-rock	Island Records Philippines; MCA Music	
29	Tanso, Pilak at Ginto	Imago	Pop rock	Universal Records	
29	She Wanna F	Zelijah	Hip hop/Rap	Sony Music Philippines	
29	Kung Nag-aatubili	Syd Hartha	Indie/Alternative folk	Sony Music Philippines	
29	Never Mine	Mobbstarr	Hip hop/Rap	Warner Music Philippines	
29	Gulo	Paul Pablo	Pop	Warner Music Philippines	
29	Temple	ST. WOLF	Alternative/rock	Warner Music Philippines	
29	Slow Dance	Kelvin Miranda	Pop	GMA Music	
29	Malapit Na Akong Mahulog Sa Iyo	Lyca Gairanod	Pop	Vicor Music	
29	Wait For Me	Nadine Lustre	Pop, Vocals	Hyphen Music	
31	Karma	Skusta Clee (feat. Gloc-9)	Pop	Panty Droppaz League	

==== November ====
Date	Single / Album	Artist(s)	Genre(s)	Label(s)	Reference
3	Miming	Meowfie	Pop	Independent	
4	Alive	Ace Banzuelo	Pop	Sony Music Philippines	
5	Pagod Na Ako	Janine Berdin	Pop	Star Music	
5	Tsismosa	Tubero	Grindcore	Tower of Doom	
5	Fool No Mo	AC Bonifacio	Dance pop, rap	Star Magic Records	
5	Naghihintay	ALLMO$T	R&B, soul	Viva Records	
5	Tawag Lang	JRoa	R&B, soul	Viva Records	
5	Crush Kong Curly	Wilbert Ross	Pop	Viva Records	
5	Be It	Claudia	Pop	Viva Records	
5	As Within so Without	MaJo	Hip hop/Rap	Enterphil Entertainment Corporation; Ivory Music	
5	Telepono	Terazza	Rock	Enterphil Entertainment Corporation; Ivory Music	
5	call me when you wake up (EP)	Tala	Pop	Universal Records	
5	Tuloy na Tuloy Pa Rin Ang Pasko	Ben&Ben	Pop, Christmas	Sony Music Philippines	
6	Simulan (Starting Now)	Maris Racal	Filipino Disney	Walt Disney Records	
8	Andito Tayo Para sa Isa't Isa	Various artists	Christmas	ABS-CBN Entertainment	
8	Bagong Lipunan	Plethora	Rock, patriotic	—N/a	
11	Natataranta	LITZ	P-Pop	Viva Records	
11	Una	The Vowels They Orbit	Pop rock	Sony Music Philippines	
12	Probinsyana	VVS Collective (feat. Queenay)	Hip hop/Rap	Def Jam Philippines; UMUSIC Philippines	
12	Closer Than Before	Lola Amour (feat. Clara Benin)	Indie rock	Warner Music Philippines	
12	Proof	She's Only Sixteen	Indie pop	Bavarian Records	
15	Ang Liwanag at Diwa ng Pasko	Kingdom Singers	Christmas	KJC Music, Sonshine Media Network International	
16	Landi (Galawan)	Young Fresho	Hip hop/Rap	Independent	
18	Lika Na (EP)	Raven	Pop	Sony Music Philippines	
19	Lumayo	Daydream	P-Pop	Rebel Records PH; Warner Music Philippines	
19	Ang Ating Pag-Ibig	Princess Velasco	Pop	GMA Music	
19	Bitaw	Daryl Ong	Pop	Viva Records	
19	Mapaglaro	Magnus Haven	Rock	Blacksheep Records Manila	
19	Ready to Start	Marlo Mortel	Pop	PolyEast Records	
19	Lahing Maangas	Def Jam Rekognize	Hip hop/Rap	Def Jam Philippines; UMUSIC Philippines	
19	Bakal na Pader	Tiffany Lhei (featuring Yuridope)	Hip hop/Rap	Def Jam Philippines; UMUSIC Philippines	
19	Open Up	Elise Huang	Pop	Island Records Philippines; UMUSIC Philippines	
19	MPOWERED	Maymay Entrata	Pop	Star Music	
19	Adlaw	Press Hit Play	P-Pop	Evolution Media	
19	Wag Naman	Mizael	Pop	Universal Records	
23	Para Lang Sa'yo	Mark Carpio	Pop, Ballad	Viva Records	
24	Tayong Dalawa Sa Pasko	Nobita	Pop, Christmas	Sony Music Philippines	
24	DNY	R Rules	P-Pop	UMUSIC Philippines	
25	Stig	Bugoy na Koykoy (feat. Flow G)	Hip hop/Rap	Independent	
25	Simula Palang Nung Una	Zack Tabudlo	Pop	Island Records Philippines	
25	Maybe	I Belong to the Zoo	Pop	Independent	
26	Christmas Without You	Nicole Asensio	Pop, Christmas	Warner Music Philippines	
26	Minsan	Bianca	Pop	Sony Music Philippines	
26	Haranasa	Kiyo	Pop, Hip hop/Rap	Independent	
26	Monkey Business	ISSA	Pop	Independent	
26	Di Na	8 Ballin'	Hip hop/Rap	Def Jam Philippines; UMUSIC Philippines	
26	Tawid	Cheats	Indie pop	Island Records Philippines; UMUSIC Philippines	
26	Hakbang (Soltada Remix)	Cheats	Alternative	Island Records Philippines; UMUSIC Philippines	

==== December ====
Date	Single / Album	Artist(s)	Genre(s)	Label(s)	Reference
3	Huling Unang Sayaw	Ebe Dancel	Pop rock	Widescope Entertainment	
3	Daylight	Belle Mariano	Pop	Star Music	
3	Eleven:Eleven	Lesha	Indie/Alternative	Tarsier Records	
3	Dahilan	Bey	Pop	Universal Records	
3	Halaman	Banda ni Kleggy	Rock	Soupstar Music, Warner Music Philippines	
3	Alex Bruce (EP)	Alex Bruce	Hip hop/Rap	Sony Music Philippines	
3	Pasko'y Hindi Na Masaya	BLASTER	Electronic	Island Records Philippines	
5	Toxic Free	DJ M.O.D. and Vice Ganda (feat. Karylle)	Dance	Kutfive Music	
6	Pano	Zack Tabudlo	Pop	Island Records Philippines	
8	Apektado	Gracenote	Pop rock	Universal Records	
8	Christmas Starts When the Bers Begin (EP)	Itchyworms	Christmas, Pop rock	Sony Music Philippines	
10	Kaya	KAIA	P-pop	Sony Music Philippines	
10	Borbolen	Parokya ni Edgar	Rock	Universal Records	
10	Hanggang Dito Lang Tayo	Six Part Invention	Pop	Star Music	
10	Atin	Ex Battalion	Hip hop/Rap	Ex Battalion Music Entertainment	
10	sabik	The Juans	Pop rock	Viva Records	
10	Langit	6cyclemind	Rock	Sony Music Philippines	
10	Waste the Holidays	Leanne & Naara	Christmas, pop	Warner Music Philippines	
10	Through the Screen	Aloura	Pop	Warner Music Philippines	
10	Lutang: The Mixtape (EP)	jikamarie	R&B/Soul	Warner Music Philippines	
15	Head Up	Baby Blue	P-Pop, Ballad	Dreamusic	
15	buhay/buhay (EP)	Munimuni	Alternative folk	Sony Music Philippines	
16	Isa Lang	Arthur Nery	Pop	Viva Records	
17	Signature: Live! (EP)	Morissette	Pop	Underdog Music PH	
17	Lagi Na Lang	JRLDM (feat. Gloc-9)	Hip hop/Rap	Music Colony Records	
17	Bakit	DJ Loonyo (feat. Gloc-9)	Pop	Universal Records	
17	Tablang	Gloc-9 and Assembly Generals	Hip hop/Rap	Independent	
24	Just A Hit	Hey June!	Pop rock	Warner Music Philippines	
26	blink	Clara Benin	Pop	Sony Music Philippines	
31	Queen	Wonggoys	Pop rock, Visayan pop	22 Tango Music Group	

== Concerts and music festivals ==
Due to the COVID-19 pandemic in the Philippines, shows were mostly limited to virtual concerts, as a result of the inability to stage a full-audience concert in that year due to health and safety protocols implemented to reduce the spread of the virus.

This year featured the first live concert that was held since the start of the pandemic, the South Border Reunion Concert at the Mall of Asia Arena to crowd of about a thousand people.

=== Local artists ===
Date(s)	Artist(s)	Venue	City	Event / Tour	Note(s)	Ref(s)
December 23	South Border	Mall of Asia Arena	Pasay	The South Border Reunion Concert	First live concert held since March 2020.	
December 31	Darren Espanto, Leanne & Naara and Zild	Eastwood Mall	Quezon City	Eastwood City New Year Countdown 2022	First New Year concert since COVID-19 pandemic.	

=== Virtual concerts ===
Date(s)	Artist(s)	Venue	City	Event / Tour	Note(s)	Ref(s)
January 30	Side A	Remote location		Side A Redux: Calesa	Aired via live streaming through KTX.ph	
March 27	Sarah Geronimo	Smart Araneta Coliseum	Quezon City	Tala: The Film Concert	Aired via live streaming through Vivamax and KTX.ph	
May 22	Ben&Ben	Remote location		Ben&Ben Live!	Aired via live streaming through Kumu	
August 6	He's into Her casts with guests BGYO, Jayda, JC Alcantara, SAB and Gigi De Lana with Gigi Vibes	ABS-CBN	Quezon City	He's into Her: The Benison Ball	Aired via live streaming through KTX.ph	
September 4	Leanne & Naara	Globe Auditorium – Maybank Theater, Bonifacio Global City	Taguig	Daybreak Live!	Streamed via YouTube	
September 11	Side A (with Clara Benin and Morissette)	Remote location		Side A Redux: Calesa (2nd Set)	Aired via live streaming through KTX.ph	
September 17	Julie Anne San Jose	Various remote locations		Limitless Part 1: Breath	Aired via live streaming through GMA Synergy	
September 17–18	Neocolours	Remote location		Tuloy Pa Rin: A Fundraising Virtual Concert	Aired via live streaming through KTX.ph	
September 30	Adie, Arthur Nery, Rob Deniel, Unique Salonga	Various remote locations		HRNA: The Digital Experience	Aired via live streaming through KTX.ph	
October 9	Ely Buendia, Nobody's Home	Remote location		Ely Buendia and Nobody's Home: Superproxies	Aired via live streaming through KTX.ph	
October 23–24	Sheryn Regis	ABS-CBN	Quezon City	Love United	Aired via live streaming through KTX.ph	
October 29–30	Angeline Quinto, (with Regine Velasquez, Bugoy Drilon, Daryl Ong, and Michael Pangilinan)	Metropolitan Theater	Manila	10Q: Ten Years of Angeline Quinto at the Metropolitan Theatre – Part 1	Aired via live streaming through KTX.ph	
November 6–7	BGYO and BINI with Special performances from AC Bonifacio, KZ Tandingan and Kritiko	ABS-CBN	Quezon City	ONE DREAM: The BINI and BGYO Concert	Aired via live streaming through KTX.ph	
November 20	Julie Anne San Jose	Various remote locations		Limitless Part 2: Heal	Aired via live streaming through GMA Synergy	
November 20	This Band, Bandang Lapis, The Juans	Various remote locations		ThisBandangJuans	Aired via live streaming through KTX.ph	
November 26–27	Maymay Entrata	ABS-CBN	Quezon City	Mpowered	It will also be held via live streaming through KTX.ph	
November 26–27	Angeline Quinto (with Vice Ganda and Erik Santos)	Metropolitan Theater	Manila	10Q: Ten Years of Angeline Quinto at the Metropolitan Theatre – Part 2	Aired via live streaming through KTX.ph	
November 27	Alamat, Because, Cean Jr., Claudia, Deny, Jehramae, Jona Soquite, LITZ, Lyca Gairanod, Magnus Haven	Various remote locations		ARRIVAL: The Next Chapter of OPM	It will also be held via live streaming through KTX.ph	
November 27–28	SB19	Smart Araneta Coliseum	Quezon City	Our Zone: SB19 Third Anniversary Concert	It will also be held via live streaming through KTX.ph	
November 30 – December 1	Nina	Remote location		Nina Live: The Divas Edition	It will also be held via live streaming through KTX.ph	
December 5	Ben&Ben	Smart Araneta Coliseum	Quezon City	KUWADERNO: Ben&Ben Live at the Smart Araneta Coliseum, An Online Concert	It will also be held via live streaming through KTX.ph	
December 8	Lea Salonga, Orchestra of the Filipino Youth	Remote location		Regenerative Thanksgiving Concert	It will also be held via live streaming through KTX.ph	
December 10–11	Casts of Ang Huling El Bimbo musical (Reb Atadero, Carla Laforteza, Tanya Manalang, OJ Mariano, Phi Palmos, Gab Pangilinan, Bibo Reyes, Vic Robinson, and Shiela Francisco) (with the Manila Philharmonic Orchestra)	Newport Performing Arts Theater, Resorts World Manila	Pasay	Ang Huling El Bimbo: The Homecoming Concert	It will also be available via video on demand/streaming on December 12 through KTX.ph	
December 10–11	Aegis, CLR, Sponge Cola	Various remote locations		Salubong: The Christmas Concert	It will also be held via live streaming through KTX.ph	
December 11	Ex Battalion	Smart Araneta Coliseum	Quezon City	EVOLUXION: The Ex Battalion Concert	It will also be held via live streaming through KTX.ph	
December 11	Ogie Alcasid, Ian Veneracion	Estancia at Capitol Commons	Pasig	Christmas with the Stars	It will also be held via live streaming through KTX.ph	
December 18	Sarah Geronimo, Matteo Guidicelli	Remote location		Christmas with the G's	It will also be held via live streaming through Vivamax and KTX.ph	
December 18–19	Basil Valdez	Remote location		Sundin Ang Loob Mo: A Basil Valdez Digital Concert	It will also be held via live streaming through KTX.ph	
December 25–26	The Company	Remote location		The Company Christmas Roadtrip	It will also be held via live streaming through KTX.ph	
December 25–26	Angeline Quinto (with Andrew E. and Luis Manzano)	Metropolitan Theater	Manila	10Q: Ten Years of Angeline Quinto at the Metropolitan Theatre – Part 3	Aired via live streaming through KTX.ph	

==== International artists ====
Date(s)	Artist(s)	Venue	City	Event / Tour	Note(s)	Ref(s)
April 14	Dua Lipa	Remote location		Studio 2054	Aired via live streaming through iWantTFC; Note: The virtual concert was held in November 2020 and was streamed through Smart GigaFest.	
November 21	Adele	Griffith Observatory	Los Angeles, United States	Adele One Night Only	Streamed through Discovery+	

=== Music festivals ===
Date(s)	Artist(s)	Venue	City	Festival	Note(s)	Ref(s)
March 20–28	Various K-Pop artists	Various remote locations		KCON:TACT 3	Streamed on Smart GigaFest	
May 15	I Belong to the Zoo; Oh, Flamingo!; Keiko Necesario; Ysanygo; Brisom	Various remote locations		Globe Virtual Hangouts Fest	Streamed on GlobeOne app	
June 19–27	Various K-Pop artists	Various remote locations		KCON:TACT 4U	Streamed on Smart GigaFest	
August 28–29	Kristel Fulgar; BGYO; Bini; C13; Dasuri Choi; PHP – Press Hit Play; Kring & Happee	Various remote locations		Happy Hallyu Day 5: A Virtual Fest	Streamed on Philippine K-pop Convention Inc. (PKCI)'s Facebook page	
September 18–26	Various K-Pop artists	Various remote locations		KCON:TACT 5	Streamed on Smart GigaPlay	
September 18–19	Various artists	T-Mobile Arena	Las Vegas, United States	IHeartRadio Music Festival 2021	Streamed on Smart GigaPlay	
September 25–26	HONNE; Vance Joy; BEKA; SB19; Alamat; The Juans; Silent Sanctuary; I Belong to the Zoo; December Avenue	Various remote locations		G Music Fest 2021	Streamed on Globe Telecom's Facebook page	
October 30	Jamie Miller; SEZAIRI; Valentina Ploy; 8 Ballin'; Alex Bruce; Bianca; Cydel; Dia Mate; Denova; Isang; The Itchyworms; Jensen Gomez; Leanne & Naara; Lola Amour; Over October; SUD; Zelijah	Various remote locations		Press Play: The Play FM Website Concert	Streamed on 99.5 Play FM's website and via Twitch page	
November 12	Munimuni; Sandwich; 6cyclemind; Moonstar88; Imago; Gracenote; Johnoy Danao; Alamat; Banda ni Kleggy; The Vowels They Orbit; Shirebound and Busking; Aldrich Agad; Amiel Sol	University of the Philippines Diliman	Quezon City	UP Fair 2021: Awit Mo’y Paglaya	Aired via live streaming through KTX.ph	
November 12	Munimuni; Sandwich; 6cyclemind; Moonstar88; Imago; Gracenote; Johnoy Danao; Alamat; Banda ni Kleggy; The Vowels They Orbit; Shirebound and Busking; Aldrich Agad; Amiel Sol	Various remote locations		UP Fair 2021: Awit Mo’y Paglaya	Aired via live streaming through KTX.ph	
December 3	Ez Mil; Bamboo; Moira; BGYO; BINI; Gigi De Lana	Dubai World Trade Centre	Dubai, United Arab Emirates	1MX Dubai 2021 (Filipino Music Festival)	It will also be aired outside UAE via live streaming through KTX.ph	
December 3	AC Bonifacio; Angela Ken; Carlo Bautista; Fana; Jayda; Jeremy G.; Kritiko; Lian Kyla; Nameless Kids; SAB; Trisha Denise	—N/a	Manila	1MX Manila 2021 (Filipino Music Festival)	It will also be held via live streaming through KTX.ph	
December 17	Jim Paredes and Boboy Garovillo; Hey Moonshine; Kundirana; DLSU-D Chorale	Various remote locations		Holiday Serenade	It will also be held via live streaming through KTX.ph	
December 18	BINI; Reese Lansangan; Rachel Alejandro	Various remote locations		Holiday Serenade	It will also be held via live streaming through KTX.ph	
December 19	Johnoy Danao; Nicole Laurel Asensio; Haraya Choir	Various remote locations		Holiday Serenade	It will also be held via live streaming through KTX.ph	
December 31	Various artists, including: Ben&Ben; SB19; Zack Tabudlo; James Reid; Nadine Lustre; Juan Karlos; Arthur Nery; BLASTER; Paul Klein and Jake Goss of LANY; Maximillian; Bonnie Bailey	Various remote locations		BYE 2021	It will be streaming live on BYE 2021's official Facebook, YouTube and TikTok	

== Deaths ==
- March 30 – Claire dela Fuente (b. 1958), businesswoman and singer
- April 23 – Victor Wood (b. 1946), singer
- May 20 – Zion Aquino (b. 1979), musician
- July 23 – Wally Gonzalez (b. 1950), Juan de la Cruz Band guitarist
- September 15 – Renee "Alon" dela Rosa (b. 1959), singer-songwriter
- November 2 – Mar Lopez (b. 1936), singer
- November 16 – Heber Bartolome (b. 1948), musician
