= S.O.N.S: Sons of Nanay Sabel =

Filipino musical comedy film

- Theatrical release poster
- Directed by: Dado Lumibao
- Written by: Mel Mendoza-del Rosario
- Produced by: Vicente del Rosario III
- Starring: Ai-Ai delas Alas; Mark Maglasang; Flow G Nova Villa
- Cinematography: Rain Yamson
- Edited by: Tara Illenberger
- Music by: Vincent de Jesus
- Production company: Viva Films
- Distributed by: Viva Films
- Release date: May 8, 2019
- Running time: 109 minutes
- Country: Philippines
- Language: Filipino

S.O.N.S: Sons of Nanay Sabel is a 2019 musical comedy film directed by Dado Lumibao, starring Ai-Ai delas Alas, Mark Maglasang, Nova Villa and Flow G. The film was produced by Viva Films and it was released in the Philippines on May 8, 2019.

According to The Manila Times, the film was not "commercially successful".

== Cast ==
=== Main cast ===
- Ai-Ai delas Alas as Nanay Sabel Dela Cruz
- Mark Maglasang as Izzy Dela Cruz
- John Maren 'Emcee Rhen' Mangabang as Bhoy Dela Cruz
- Flow G as Justin Dela Cruz
- Jon Gutierrez as Troll Dela Cruz
- James Samonte as Baby James Dela Cruz
- Skusta Clee as Bieber Dela Cruz
- Kylie Verzosa as Helen

=== Supporting cast ===
- Nova Villa as Queen Gracia of Ulteria is Mother's Prince Harry
- Fabio Ide as Prince/King Harry of Ulteria
- Jon Santos as Nany Bona
- Jeric Raval as Kep. Jojo Waen is Barangay Captain
- Katya Santos as Aling Tetay Waen
- Sophia Delas Alas as Sephine Waen
- John Roa as Singer in the Bar
- Joey Marquez
- Johnny Revilla
- Marissa Delgado as Doña Narcisa
- Gary Lim
- Chad Kinis as Barangay Tanod 1
- Pio Balbuena
- Kedebon Colim
- Anne Curtis as Wedding Singer
- AJ Raval as Usi 2

== Plot ==
Ai-Ai delas Alas as Nanay Sabel plays mother to her Ex Battalion kids including Flow G, Jon Gutierrez, John Maren Mangabang and Mark Maglasang. She was accused of being a negligent mother and later on she embarks on a journey to find her sons and reunite her whole family.
