= Kalimutan Ka =

2025 single by Skusta Clee

Single by Skusta Clee
- Language: Tagalog
- Released: February 12, 2025
- Genre: Alternative rock
- Length: 4:48
- Label: Saucy Island Records
- Songwriter: Daryl Ruiz
- Producer: Daryl Ruiz

Skusta Clee singles chronology
"Shushhh" (2025)	"Kalimutan Ka" (2025)	"Bebe" (2025)

Music video
- "Kalimutan Ka" on YouTube

"Kalimutan Ka" (lit. 'Forget You') is a song by Filipino rapper and singer Skusta Clee. It was released on February 12, 2025, through his independent label Saucy Island Records. The music video followed on February 14, 2025, two days after the song's release, and went on to top YouTube Philippines' music video charts for 2025.

"Kalimutan Ka" is Clee's first released that involved the rock genre, while most of his songs are usually hip-hop, making this track his first to explore a rock sound. The song entered two Billboard local charts, peaking at number 8 on the Philippines Hot 100 and number 5 on the Top Philippine Songs.

== Background ==
"Kalimutan Ka" was first recorded in 2019 with singer and fellow Ex Battalion member John Roa. A short teaser of the chorus was released, but the full song was not released at the time and remained archived. Skusta Clee later revisited and reworked the track, releasing it in 2025 following his collaboration single "Shushhh" with Jnske and Yuridope.

In an interview with Billboard Philippines, Clee said he enjoyed showing a different side of his music through a ballad: "It feels good to show that side of me. I've always liked alternative rock and other types of rock. I'm happy people accepted me doing that even though I started in hip-hop. It also gives me more freedom to make music the way I want."

== Music video ==
The music video for "Kalimutan Ka" was released on February 14, 2025, directed by Clee and TOAD (Titus Cee). The music video became the most-viewed on YouTube Philippines for 2025.

== Commercial performance ==
"Kalimutan Ka" debuted at number 39 on the Billboard Philippines Hot 100 during the week of March 5, 2025, and peaked at number 8 by June 28, 2025. It also reached number 5 on the Top Philippine Songs chart.

The song became a trend on TikTok, where users recreated a tongue-out meme originally made by actor Alden Richards using the song as the background music.

=== Reception ===
Rome Saenz of Billboard Philippines said the song highlights Clee's versatility and shows that a strong story can cross genres, making it one of the standout tracks in his discography.

== Accolades ==
Awards and nominations for "Kalimutan Ka"
Year	Award	Category	Result	Ref.
2025	Filipino Music Awards	Song of the Year	Nominated	
2025	Filipino Music Awards	People's Choice – Song	Nominated	

== Charts ==
Chart performance for "Kalimutan Ka"
Chart	Peak
Philippines (Philippines Hot 100)	8
Philippines (Top Philippine Songs)	5

== Listicles ==
Name of publisher, year listed, name of listicle, and placement
Publisher	Year	Listicle	Placement	Ref.
Billboard Philippines	2025	25 Best Filipino Songs of 2025	Placed	
