= Victor Magtanggol =

2018 Philippine television drama series

- Title card
- Also known as: Heart of Courage
- Genre: Action drama; Fantasy
- Created by: Jules Katanyag
- Written by: Denoy Navarro-Punio; Glaiza Ramirez; Jules Katanyag; John Kenneth de Leon
- Directed by: Dominic Zapata
- Creative director: Roy Iglesias
- Starring: Alden Richards
- Theme music composer: Ex Battalion
- Opening theme: "Superhero Mo" by Ex Battalion and Alden Richards
- Country of origin: Philippines
- Original language: Tagalog
- No. of episodes: 80

Production
- Executive producer: Mona Coles-Mayuga
- Editors: Cesar Colina; Jennalyn Sablaya; Debbie Robete; Roslainy Barody; Tricia Senir
- Camera setup: Multiple-camera setup
- Running time: 25–45 minutes
- Production company: GMA Entertainment Group

Original release
- Network: GMA Network
- Release: July 30 – November 16, 2018

Victor Magtanggol (international title: Heart of Courage) is a 2018 Philippine television drama action fantasy series broadcast by GMA Network. The series is inspired by Norse mythology. Directed by Dominic Zapata, it stars Alden Richards in the title role. It premiered on July 30, 2018, on the network's Telebabad line up. The series concluded on November 16, 2018, with a total of 80 episodes.

The series is originally titled as Mitho. It is streaming online on YouTube.

== Premise ==
Many gods, including Thor, will not survive the Ragnarök. Before Thor's death, he orders his son Magni to hide his weapon, the hammer Mjölnir, until there is someone right to inherit it. Magni goes to the world of mortals to wait for the new taker of Mjölnir. There he meets Victor Magtanggol, the one who must eventually learn to use Mjölnir to protect the world and his loved ones from Móði, Thor's son and Magni's brother, who is upset for not inheriting Mjölnir, and Loki who plans to spread chaos in the mortal world.

== Cast and characters ==
Cast

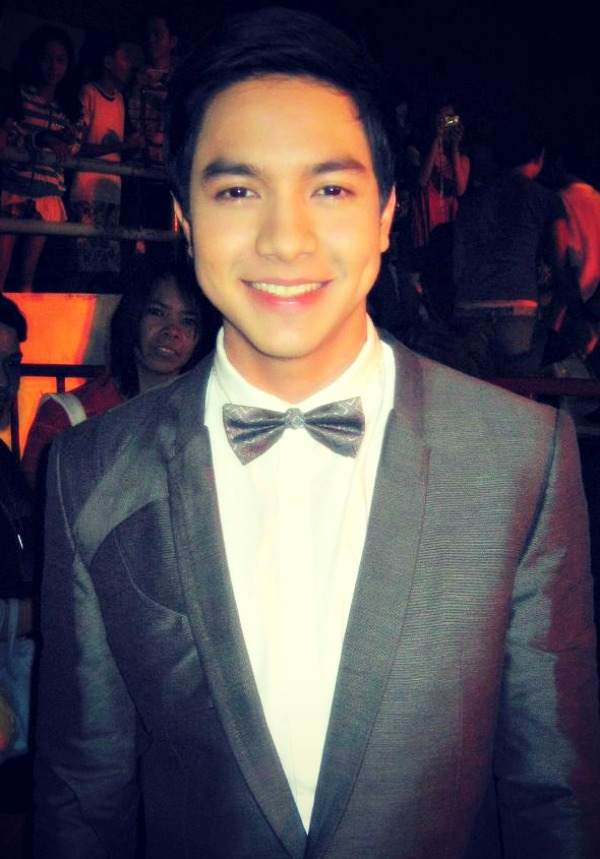
Alden Richards

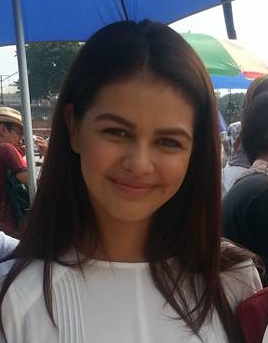
Janine Gutierrez

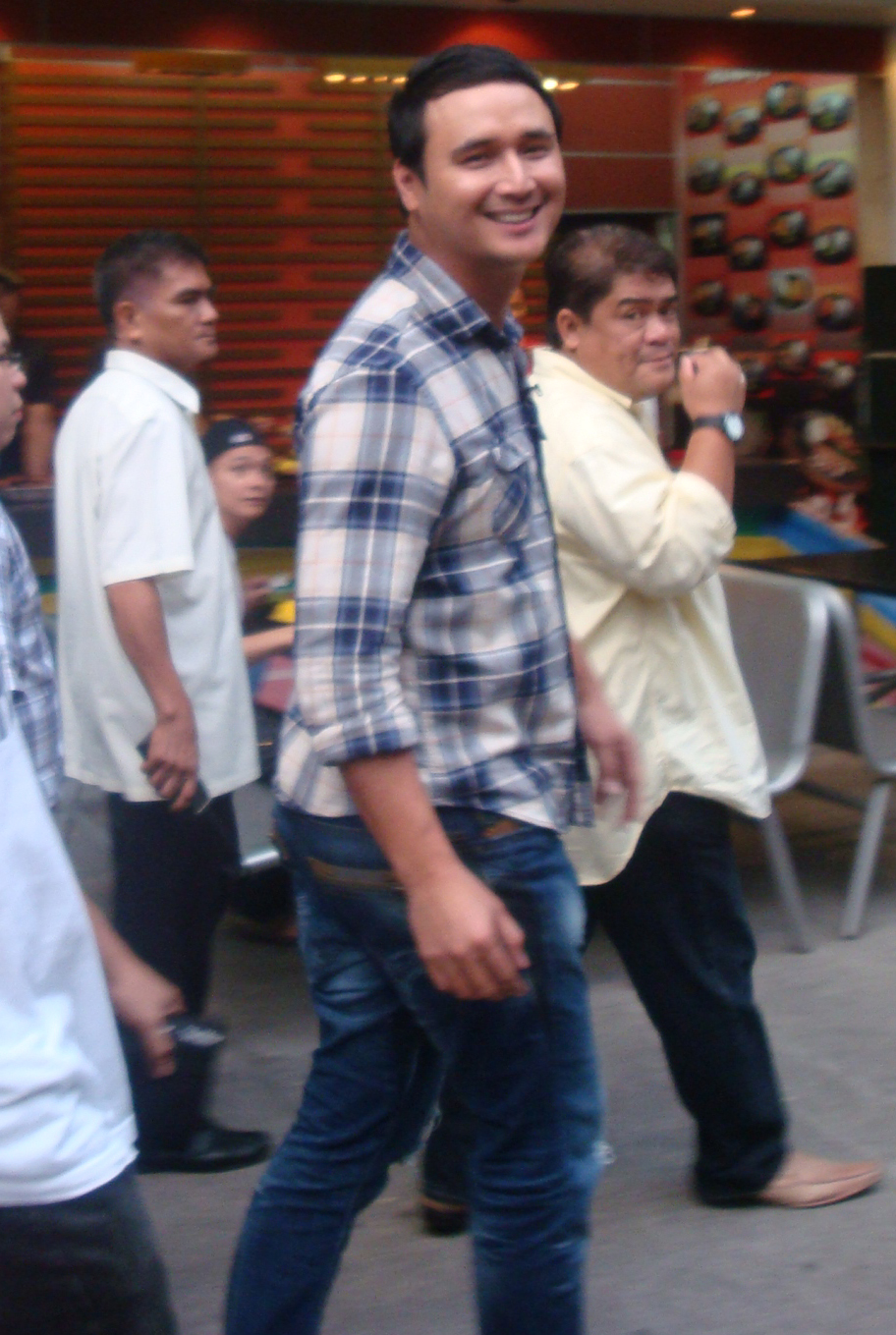
John Estrada

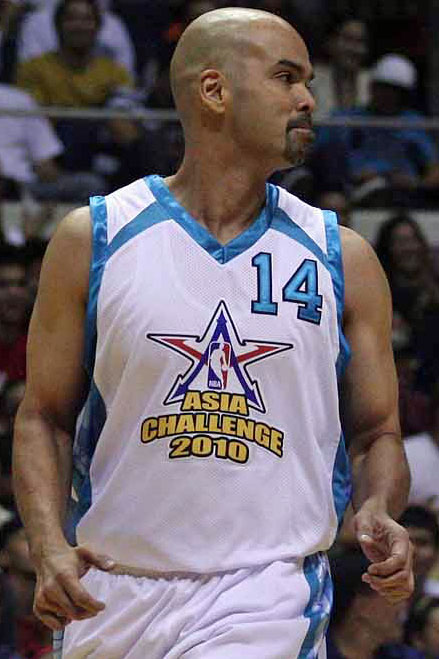
Benjie Paras

Lead cast

- Alden Richards as Victor "Hammerman" Magtanggol

Supporting cast

- Coney Reyes as Vivienne Delos Santos-Magtanggol
- Eric Quizon as Hector Regalado
- Andrea Torres as Sif / Ms. S
- Janine Gutierrez as Gwen Regalado-Corona
- Pancho Magno as Móði
- John Estrada as Loki / Mikolai
- Al Tantay as Tomas Magtanggol
- Freddie Webb as Renato Regalado
- Chynna Ortaleza as Lynette Magtanggol-Domingo / Hel
- Maritoni Fernandez as Alice Espiritu-Regalado
- Dion Ignacio as Percival "Perci" Domingo
- Kristoffer Martin as Lance E. Regalado / Fenrir
- Miguel Faustmann as Magni / Magnus
- Yuan Francisco as Carmelo "Meloy" M. Domingo
- Lindsay De Vera as Anne Magtanggol
- Reese Tuazon as Honelyn De Mesa
- Benjie Paras as Erwin Bravo
- Lucho Ayala as Timothy Ferdinand "Tim" Corona
- Jon Gutierrez as Mario Magtanggol
- Flow G as Luigi Magtanggol

Recurring cast

- Noel Urbano as the voice of Níðhöggr and Ratatoskr

Guest cast

- Conan Stevens as Thor
- Matthias Rhoads as James
- Diana Zubiri as Freya
- Fabio Ide as Baldur
- Natalia Moon as Frigg
- Sheena Halili as Janice
- Luri Vincent Nalus as Dennis
- Michelle Dee as Gwen's boss
- Chariz Solomon as Cynthia
- John Feir as a construction worker
- Pekto as Ringgo
- Rob Moya as a construction worker
- Kevin Santos as James
- Carlos Agassi as Arvin
- Sophie Albert as Edda
- Pen Medina as Alcala
- Glaiza de Castro as Ena
- Kylie Padilla as Ami
- Gabbi Garcia as Lena
- Sanya Lopez as Aya
- Janice Hung as Gunnlöð
- Ian Ignacio as Þrymr
- Tonio Quiazon as a gun smuggler
- Dave Bornea as Iking
- Julius Miguel as teenage Meloy

== Development ==
GMA Network tasked writers to come up for a television series based on Norse mythology. Jules Katanyag, concept creator of Victor Magtanggol described what he and other writers came up as "best reflects the Filipino condition," which is that of uncertainty.

The show is set in present-day Philippines, after several Norse deities including Thor died following Ragnarök, a series of catastrophic events in the Norse Mythology. Part of the series was also shot outside of the Philippines.

The theme song "Superhero Mo," is a collaboration between Alden Richards and the hip-hop group Ex Battalion. The latter composed the song. A lyric video for the song was released by GMA Music on May 28, 2018.

== Production ==
Principal photography commenced in June 2018.

== Ratings ==
According to AGB Nielsen Philippines' Nationwide Urban Television Audience Measurement People in television homes, the pilot episode earned a 12.4% rating. The final episode scored an 11.1% rating.

== Accolades ==
Accolades received by Victor Magtanggol
Year	Award	Category	Recipient	Result	Ref.
2019	33rd PMPC Star Awards for Television	Best Drama Actor	Alden Richards	Nominated	
