= Lo Ki (Filipino rapper) =

Filipino rapper

- Also known as: Issa Lo Ki
- Born: Laureano Dela Cruz
- Genres: Pinoy hip hop; trap; pop rap; alternative hip hop
- Occupation: Rapper
- Years active: 2018–present
- Labels: Viva; DRP Records

Laureano Dela Cruz (Note: Lo Ki's real name can be seen in the writer credits on his songs on Spotify.), known professionally as Lo Ki and also as Issa Lo Ki, is a Filipino rapper. He is known for his singles "Kagome" (2021) and "Manifest" (2022).

== Career ==
Lo Ki began his music career in 2018 with the single "ATBP.", which became an early success for his career. The song earned more than 3 million streams shortly after its release. He subsequently released several singles.

In 2021, Lo Ki released "Kagome", and became popular on TikTok through a lip-sync challenge and later gained more than 21 million views on YouTube. Lo Ki later recorded an acoustic version of "Kagome" for The Lonelilly Sessions.

In April 2022, Lo Ki released "Manifest" as a follow-up to "Kagome". "Manifest" is initially known as a song influenced by hip-hop and trap. It has been characterized as a gangsta rap inspired music video with shots that are fast-paced against a menacing backdrop of the city. In September, Lo Ki released an alternate version of "Manifest", and was directed by Louie Ong. Lo Ki performed with the rock and ska band Slowdough in an industrial setting featuring pyrotechnic effects. "Manifest" had over 12 million combined streams on Spotify and YouTube. His other songs, including "ATBP." and "Munting Paraiso", also gained streams on digital music platforms. In December, Lo Ki was included among the Filipino rappers and songs identified by The Philippine Star in its list of the biggest hits of the year. "Kagome" and "Manifest" were listed among the notable rap songs of 2022.

In 2024, Lo Ki released "Sadista", a collaboration with rapper Skusta Clee. Its production combines pop and rap elements. The music video features Lo Ki and Clee performing around their neighborhood. Lo Ki later released "YSA [Year of Issa]", and the music video depicts Lo Ki with his crew at a barbecue and spending time with his romantic partner.

== Musical styles ==
Lo Ki is known for his raw and unpretentious rap delivery. Manila Bulletin described his growing popularity as spreading through word of mouth and noted his preference for making music rather than focusing on posturing.

== Discography ==
=== Singles ===
- "ATBP." (2018)
- "Munting Paraiso"
- "Kagome" (2021)
- "Manifest" (2022)
- "Manifest" (alternate version) (2022)
- "Sadista" (with Skusta Clee)
- "YSA [Year of Issa]" (2024)
