= Jelai Andres =

Filipino actress and content creator (born 1991)

- Born: February 12, 1991 (age 35); Taguig, Philippines
- Citizenship: Filipino
- Occupations: Actress; Content creator
- Years active: 2012–present

Jelai Andres (born February 12, 1991) is a Filipino actress and content creator. She has appeared in GMA Network television series of One of the Baes and Owe My Love.

== Early life ==
Andres was born on February 12, 1991, in Taguig, Philippines.

== Career ==
Andres started appeared in television projects from 2012. She played a role of Dorie Quirino in the GMA Network series One of the Baes (2019–2020). She later appeared in Owe My Love (2021) as Jenny Rose Guipitof and in episodes of television programs including Dear Uge, Daig Kayo ng Lola Ko, and Tadhana.

She also posts video content on YouTube.

== Personal life ==
Andres married rapper Jon Gutierrez (also known as King Badger) on October 6, 2018. The couple separated and later reconciled before separating again. Their marriage was annulled, Andres confirmed the annulment in July 2026.

== Filmography ==
=== Television ===
Year	Title	Role	Notes
2012 Filipino TV Series	Kung Ako’y Iiwan Mo	Lorraine	
2019–2020 Philippine Television	One of the Baes	Dorie Quirino	
2020 Philippine Television	Daig Kayo ng Lola Ko	Celebes	
2021 Philippine Television	Owe My Love	Jenny Rose Guipit	
2019–2021 Philippine Television	Dear Uge	Various	

=== Film ===
Year	Title	Role	Notes
2019	Feelennial	Aerial	
2021	Kuta		
