= O.C. Dawgs =

Filipino hip hop group

- Origin: Upper Bicutan, Taguig, Philippines
- Genres: Pinoy hip hop; trap
- Years active: 2012–present
- Labels: Panty Droppaz League; Ex Battalion Music
- Members: Skusta Clee; Bullet-D; Jnske

Old Cash Dawgs, more popularly known by the shortened term O.C. Dawgs, is a Filipino hip hop trio consisting of Skusta Clee, Bullet-D and Jnske that was formed in 2012. The collective is known for their numerous hit singles "Pauwi Nako", "Akala Ko Nung Una", "Kriminal", and "Hayaan Mo Sila", the collaborative trap track with Ex Battalion in 2017 that almost topped the now-defunct Billboard Philippines Top 20 chart.

== History and career ==
Old Cash Dawgs was formed and founded in 2012 by Skusta Clee, who mostly writes the song hooks, followed by Bullet-D and Jnske. Skusta Clee, the lead member of O.C. Dawgs, pioneered the Pinoy trap genre, which helped launch the country's mainstream trap movement. Despite being underground at first, O.C. Dawgs dominated Musical.ly in 2016 with the release of "Kriminal", the same year the group joined Ex Battalion.

On September 18, 2017, "Hayaan Mo Sila", their collaboration with Ex Battalion, debuted on the Billboard Philippines Top 20 chart. In their 16th week on the chart, they peaked at #2. On June 18, 2018, their performance of that song on the "Wish Bus" of Wish 107.5 was uploaded to Youtube. Two days later, it had topped YouTube PH’s trends list.

The O.C. Dawgs have seen phenomenal success with "Pauwi Nako", which was released in 2018 under the Panty Droppaz League music label, and has amassed millions of streams on both Spotify and YouTube platforms. Their performance of that song on the "Wish Bus" ranked third on YouTube PH's top trending music videos for 2019. It was the fastest video from their channel to hit 10 million YouTube views in no less than two weeks.

== Controversies ==
=== Plagiarism ===
Ex Battalion members Skusta Clee and Flow G have been accused of plagiarism for releasing a promotional track entitled "Deym" identical to "Ddaeng" by BTS in September 2020. The contentious piece sparked heated debate, making #SkustaCleeisGoingtoJailParty a trending topic on Philippine Twitter. A few weeks later, the group's management denied allegations claiming that the two pieces are 'inherently different' and that they used a generic triplet flow. The management also added that "parallel thinking among artists do happen and it cannot be avoided".

== Members ==
- Skusta Clee – leader, vocalist, rapper
- Bullet D – rapper
- Jnske – rapper

== Discography ==
=== Singles ===
==== As lead artist ====
Year	Title	Album
2015	Kriminal	Non-album singles
2016	Akala Ko Nung Una (featuring Future Thug)	Non-album singles
2018	Pauwi Nako (featuring Flow G, Yuri Dope)	Non-album singles
2022	Pagmamahal Mo Lang (featuring Flow G)	Non-album singles

==== As featured artist ====
Year	Title
2017	Hayaan Mo Sila (with Ex Battalion)
2018	SouthBoys (with Ex Battalion)

== Awards and nominations ==
Award ceremony	Year	Category	Nominee(s)/work(s)	Result	Ref.
Wish Music Awards	2018	Wish Hip-Hop Song of the Year	Hayaan Mo Sila (with Ex Battalion)	Nominated	
Wish Music Awards	2019	Wishclusive Elite Circle — Bronze	Hayaan Mo Sila (with Ex Battalion)	Won	
Wish Music Awards	2020	Wishclusive Hip-hop Performance of the Year	Pauwi Nako (feat. Yuri Dope, Flow G) (Note: Received PhP 100K for their beneficiary, Make-A-Wish Foundation Philippines)	Won	
Wish Music Awards	2020	Wishclusive Elite Circle — Bronze	Pauwi Nako (feat. Yuri Dope, Flow G)	Won	
Wish Music Awards	2020	Wishclusive Elite Circle — Silver	Pauwi Nako (feat. Yuri Dope, Flow G)	Won	
Wish Music Awards	2020	Wishclusive Elite Circle — Gold	Pauwi Nako (feat. Yuri Dope, Flow G)	Won	
Wish Music Awards	2021	Wishclusive Elite Circle — Platinum	Pauwi Nako (feat. Yuri Dope, Flow G)	Won	

== See also ==
- Filipino hip hop
