= Bandang Lapis =

Pop band in Rizal, Philippines

- Origin: Rodriguez, Rizal, Philippines
- Genres: Pop; pop rock; acoustic rock; adult alternative
- Years active: 2018–present
- Label: Viva Records; (2020–present)
- Members: Lesther Abaño; Mark Jay Nievas; Lenrey Beltran; Ryan Paul Marangga; Leandro Repuno; Ivan Morallos
- Past members: Jomari Luna

Bandang Lapis (stylized as Bandang LAPIS) is a pop band from Rizal, Philippines, known for their viral all-Tagalog compositions online.

The band is originally composed of Lesther Abaño (lead vocals), Mark Jay Nievas (lead guitar, backing vocals), Lenrey Beltran (rhythm guitar), Ryan Paul Marangga (bass guitar), Jomari Luna (keyboards), Leandro Repuno (drums, percussion, backing vocals), and Ivan Morallos (spoken word poetry, synths).

The band is known for their hit songs Kabilang Buhay, Sana'y Di Nalang, Kung Saan Ka Masaya, and Nang Dumating Ka.

Their song, Kabilang Buhay, became one of the top streamed songs on YouTube Philippines. As of 2024, its official music video reached almost 60 million views while its lyric video reached 80 million views in 2022. Their live performance of the song in Wish 107.5 also reached 100 million views in 2024.

== History ==
The band started out with childhood friends Mark Jay Nievas and Lenrey Beltran playing songs together in their local neighborhood at Rodriguez, Rizal in 2017. Nievas was already composing his own original songs prior to the formation of the band. Nievas then decided to invite his other childhood acquaintances and network of schoolmates who are into music until they finalized the current lineup in 2018. Lesther Abaño was already joining amateur singing contests as a solo artist before joining the band.

The final lineup started joining local band competitions where they performed their original compositions (mostly composed by Nievas). They were hailed champions in their first competition together as a band. In 2019, the group started uploading their songs in streaming media sites such as YouTube, Spotify and Apple Music. The band broke into Spotify's Viral 50 (Philippines) chart, initially making their debut at No. 33 then making the big jump to No. 17 just inside a week with the song Kabilang Buhay. The song was written by Nievas and was inspired by drummer Leandro Repuno's friend whose girlfriend died. The actor in the song's official music video was the one who lost his girlfriend. In 2020, before the COVID-19 pandemic, the band signed with major record label Viva Records. The band was named the Philippines' "Biggest Breakout Band of 2020".

Other songs of the band also reached over a million views in streaming sites such as Sana'y Di Nalang, Kung Saan Ka Masaya and Nang Dumating Ka. Some of the band members are still in school and are finishing their studies while continuing doing music. The group also performed at Coke Studio Philippines Season 4 in 2021.

== Etymology ==
The band's name, which translated to English as "Pencil Band", was suggested by Nievas and is a reference to their major influence Eraserheads and their song Huwag Mo Nang Itanong. It is also a nod to their songwriting process where pencil is their primary tool. As per lead singer Abaño, philosophically, "a pencil has the capability to erase and rectify an error, similar to that in life". Additionally according to Nievas, "it is an easy enough word to remember".

== Members ==
- Lesther Abaño – lead vocals
- Mark Jay Nievas – lead guitar, backing vocals, chief songwriter
- Lenrey Beltran – rhythm guitar
- Ryan Paul Marangga – bass guitar
- Leandro Repuno – drums, percussion, backing vocals
- Ivan Morallos – spoken word poetry, rap, backing vocals, percussion, synths, additional acoustic guitar

Former member

- Jomari Luna – keyboards, synths, occasional backing vocals (on indefinite hiatus since 2023)

== Discography ==
=== Notable singles ===
- "Kabilang Buhay"
- "Sana'y Di Nalang"
- "Kung Saan Ka Masaya"
- "Pagsisisi"
- "Nang Dumating Ka"
- "Ayaw" (cover)
- "Pag-asa" (with Syd Hartha)
- "Dating Tayo"
- "Pagbilang Ng Tatlo"
- "Huling Mensahe"
- "Kung Alam Mo Lang"

EPs

- Bandang LAPIS Acoustic (2021)
