= Magnus Haven =

Alternative rock and pop band

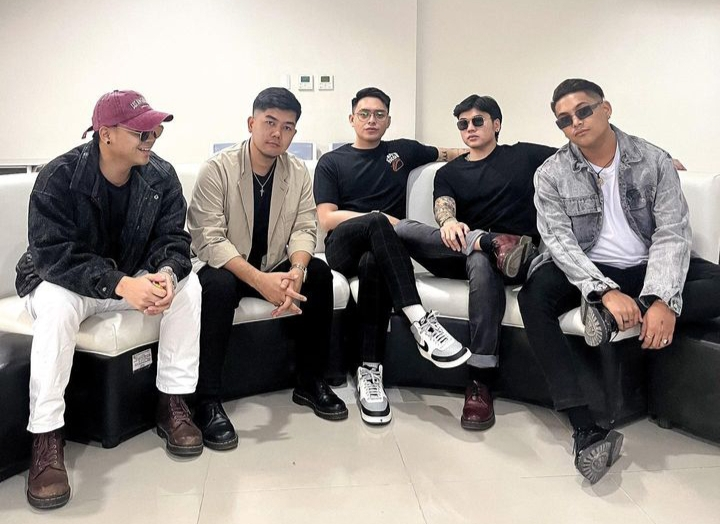
- Magnus Haven in 2023

Background information
- Origin: Metro Manila, Philippines
- Genres: Experimental; Alternative rock; Pop
- Years active: 2017–present
- Labels: Warner Music Philippines; Blacksheep Records Manila
- Members: Rajih Mendoza; David Galang; Louise Vaflor; Rey Maestro; Sean Espejo
- Website: www.grandlarain.com

Magnus Haven is an alternative rock and pop band from Manila, Philippines. The band also described their music as a fusion of various musical genres with varying styles from one song to another.

The band is composed of Rajih Mendoza (lead vocals and rhythm guitar), David Galang (vocals and keyboards), Louise Vaflor (lead guitar and backing vocals), Rey Maestro (bass guitar and backing vocals), and Sean Espejo (drums and percussion).

The band is known for their hit song Imahe, which is written by bassist Rey Maestro, released in 2018.

== History ==
According to the band members, the name Magnus Haven literally translates to "the greatest sanctuary".

The band originally started in 2017 as an acoustic trio composed of childhood friends Louise Vaflor and Rey Maestro, together with Sean Espejo. In 2018, they decided to forge a full-fledged band and held auditions for additional members wherein Rajih Mendoza and David Galang were then selected. The members were aged 18 to 23 when they started the band.

Magnus Haven released "Imahe" in November 2018, which Maestro based on his long-distance relationship which lasted two years. It wasn't until 2020 that the song trended after they performed it at an event in Batangas State University. "Imahe" ended the year as the "Philippines’ Most Streamed Local Song" on Spotify.

In 2022, Magnus Haven released "Oh Jo", an ode to a loved one. The song trended on YouTube as the top OPM track. They also released "Maria Clara" later that year. In 2023, they released "Hele" (lullaby).

== Band members ==
- Rajih Mendoza - lead vocals, rhythm guitar (2018–present)
- David Galang - vocals, keyboards, keytar (2018–present)
- Louise Vaflor - lead guitar, backing vocals (2017–present)
- Rey Maestro - bass guitar, backing vocals (2017–present)
- Sean Espejo - drums, percussion (2017–present)

== Influences ==
The band cites South Border, IV of Spades, The Beatles, John Mayer, December Avenue, KZ Tandingan, Chris Brown, Kamikazee and Moira Dela Torre as major influences.

== Discography ==
=== Notable singles ===
List of singles as lead artist, showing year released, selected chart positions, and associated albums
Year	Title	Peak chart positions		Album	Ref
Year	Title	PHL	TPS	Album	Ref
2018	Imahe	64	—	Non-album singles	
2019	Kapalmuks	—	—	Non-album singles	
2019	Panalangin	—	—	Non-album singles	
2020	Santuwaryo	—	—	Non-album singles	
2020	Multo	—	—	Non-album singles	
2020	Landas	—	—	Non-album singles	
2020	Noel	—	—	Non-album singles	
2021	Rosas	—	—	Non-album singles	
2021	Mapaglaro	—	—	Non-album singles	
2022	Oh, Jo	—	—	Non-album singles	
2022	Maria Clara	—	—	Non-album singles	
2023	Hele	—	—	Non-album singles	
2023	Dambana	—	—	Non-album singles	
2023	Hiling	—	—	Non-album singles	
2024	Naliligaw	—	—	Non-album singles	
2025	Kape	—	—	Non-album singles	
2025	Gabi-gabi	–	–	Non-album singles	
2026	Madaling Araw	–	–	Non-album singles	

=== Miscellaneous ===
- Kung Tayo x Imahe (ft. Skusta Clee) (2021)
- Ang Liwanag (ft. Skusta Clee) (2021)
- Karma (ft. Lian Dyogi) (2023)
- Imahe (ft. Malupiton) (2026)

== Awards and nominations ==
Award ceremony	Year	Category	Nominee(s)/work(s)	Result	Ref.
Wish Music Awards	2021	Wishclusive Elite Circle — Silver	Imahe	Won	
Wish Music Awards	2023	Wishclusive Elite Circle — Gold	Imahe	Won	
