= Skusta Clee =

Filipino rapper

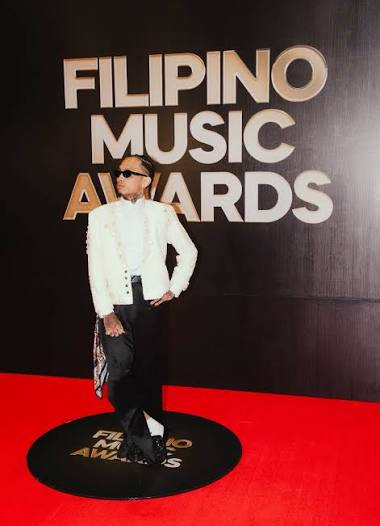
- Skusta Clee at Filipino Music Awards

Background information
- Born: Daryl Jake Borja Ruiz; February 16, 1996 (age 30); Upper Bicutan, Taguig City, Philippines
- Genres: Hip hop; trap; R&B; Pop; Alternative rock
- Occupations: Rapper; singer; composer; producer
- Instruments: Vocals; guitar
- Years active: 2014–present
- Labels: Ex Battalion Music; Panty Droppaz League; Saucy Island Records
- Member of: Ex Battalion; O.C. Dawgs; Kakaiboys (Note: Kakaiboys is a Filipino hip hop trio composed of Ex Battalion members Skusta Clee, Flow G, and Bosx1ne)

YouTube information
- Channel: Skusta Clee TV
- Subscribers: 3.36 million
- Views: 443.1 million
- Last updated: December 27, 2025

Daryl Jake Borja Ruiz (born February 16, 1996), known professionally as Skusta Clee, is a Filipino rapper and a member of the Filipino hip-hop collective Ex Battalion. He is known for his numerous hit singles "Zebbiana", "Pauwi Nako", "Dance With You", and "Kalimutan Ka". He is also a member of O.C. Dawgs, a hip-hop group he formed in 2012.

== History and career ==
A controversial figure in local hip-hop, Ruiz is perhaps the most prominent hip-hop artist in the Philippines from the late 2010s to the early 2020s. He has amassed billions of combined streams on all digital platforms, such as Spotify and YouTube. He is the pioneer of the Pinoy trap genre, as he started the mainstream trap movement in the country. His tracks dominated Musical.ly in 2016, and which he joined the collective Ex Battalion in the same year.

The singer-rapper is also signed to Panty Droppaz League, a partner label of Ex Battalion. Among the label’s biggest hits, which contributed to its widespread success, are "Pauwi Nako" (2018), "Zebbiana" (2019), and "Dance With You" (2020). These tracks have collectively accumulated hundreds of millions of views and streams on YouTube and Spotify.

In 2019, Ruiz starred in the box-office feature Sons of Nanay Sabel alongside his groupmates from Ex Battalion.

In Coco Martin and Angelica Panganiban's 2021 romantic comedy film Love or Money, Ruiz's "Zebbiana" was used as the movie's theme song and became part of its official soundtrack.

On June 20, 2021, Skusta Clee released the song "Lagi" (lit. 'All the Time'). The video for the song included his newborn daughter.

On October 31, 2021, Skusta Clee released "Karma" featuring Gloc-9, with an accompanying "Thriller"-inspired music video starring Bea Alonzo and Awra Briguela. The short film gained over 2 million views and took the top trending spot on YouTube PH shortly after its release. The song was produced by Daniel "Flip D" Tuazon and Christian "Chriilz" Andalez and the music video was directed by Titus Cee.

In 2022, the music video of Skusta Clee's "Dance With You" featuring Yuri Dope became the most-viewed music video by an OPM artist on YouTube. As of April 2022, the music video had crossed 190.2 million views, surpassing Sarah Geronimo's "Tala" which ranked second with 187.6 million views.

== Controversies ==
=== "Tap Na" controversy ===
In late 2019, a video clip of Ruiz scoffing at unknown rappers have gone viral. The 12-second video sparked heated debate among netizens for his 'unpleasant' attitude. A year later, the rapper-singer songwriter reused the catchphrase "Tap na" (stop) as a closing line in his verse in Ex Battalion's diss track Yearly. The track depicts the group's success and its presence being 'timely' in the rap scene, and is also a response to its critics.

== Personal life ==
His former partner, Filipina-Lebanese YouTuber Zeinab Harake, gave birth to their daughter Zebbiana “Bia” on April 28, 2021. In May 2022, Harake confirmed her break-up with Ruiz.

== Discography ==
=== Extended plays ===
List of extended plays with selected details
Title	Album Details	Ref.
Trifecta (with Flow G)	Released: March 8, 2024 (PH); Label: Panty Droppaz League; Format: digital download, streaming media; Track listing: 1. "Angas"; 2. "Deserve"; 3. "Inggit"	

=== Singles ===
==== As a lead artist ====
List of singles as lead artist, showing year released, selected chart positions, and associated albums
Title	Year	Peak chart positions		Album
Title	Year	PHL	PHL TPS	Album
"Dami Mong Alam"	2015	–	–	Non-album singles
"Paalam" (with Future Thug)	2018	–	–	Non-album singles
"Sa Susunod Na Lang" (featuring Yuri Dope)	2018	30	–	Non-album singles
"Zebbiana"	2019	–	–	Non-album singles
"N'Luv'" (featuring Leslie)	2020	–	–	Non-album singles
"Umaasa"	2020	–	–	Non-album singles
"Nandito Lang Ako" (with Jnske, Leslie, Honcho, Bullet D & Flow G)	2020	–	–	Non-album singles
"Kung Tayo"	2020	–	–	Non-album singles
"Dance with You" (featuring Yuri Dope)	2020	–	–	Non-album singles
"Lagi"	2021	–	–	Non-album singles
"Ang Liwanag" (with Magnus Haven)	2021	–	–	Non-album singles
"Karma" (featuring Gloc-9)	2021	–	–	Non-album singles
"Kaya Natin"	2021	–	–	Non-album singles
"Alak Pa" (featuring Yuri Dope)	2022	–	–	Non-album singles
"Solo"	2022	–	–	Non-album singles
"Testing"	2023	–	–	Non-album singles
"Ikaw Na Nga Yon" (featuring Flow G)	2023	–	–	Non-album singles
"Noche Buena"	2023	–	–	Non-album singles
"Lagabog" (featuring Illest Morena)	2023	–	–	Non-album singles
"Kalimutan Ka"	2025	8	5	Non-album singles
"Bebe"	2025	–	–	Non-album singles
"Since Day One" (featuring Flow G)	2026	1	1	Non-album singles

==== As a featured artist ====
Year	Title
2019	HBD (Birthday Mo) (with Donnalyn Bartolome, Bassilyo, Smugglaz, Zaito)
2020	Dahil Sayo (with Jom of ALLMO$T)
2020	You & I (with Chriilz, Ijiboy, Bosx1ne)
2020	Halika Na (with Billy Crawford)
2020	Pasensya Na (with Honcho, Jekkpot)
2020	Iisang Tulay (with Mike Kosa, OG Sacred)
2020	Wag Na Lang (with MC Einstein)
2021	Pwedeng Ayusin Natin To? (with Because)
2021	Sabay sa Ulap (with SLy Kane, Jkris, Zargon)
2022	Kumpisal (with Gloc-9)
2023	Bawal (with Yuri Dope)
2023	Paasa (Remix) (with Chriilz)
2023	Huli Na (with Yuri Dope)
2023	Laya (with Flow G)
2024	Ligaw Na Bullet (with Denise Laurel)

== Awards and nominations ==
Award ceremony	Year	Category	Nominee(s)/work(s)	Result	Ref.
MYX Music Awards	2020	Spotify's Top OPM Hip-Hop Artist	Skusta Clee	Won	
Wish Music Awards	2019	Wishclusive R&B Performance of the Year	Zebbiana	Won	
Filipino Music Awards	2025	Song of the Year	Kalimutan ka	Nominated	
Filipino Music Awards	2026	Hip-Hop Song of the Year	Since Day One	Won	
Filipino Music Awards	2026	Song of the Year	Since Day One	Won	
