= Allmo$t =

Filipino hip hop group

- Origin: Olongapo, Zambales, Philippines
- Genres: Hip hop; R&B; pop
- Years active: 2018–present
- Labels: Viva Records; Believe Music
- Members: Clien Alcazar: Jomuel Casem; Russell dela Fuente; Angelo Luigi "Crakky" Timog

Allmost (styled in all caps or ALLMO$T) is a Filipino hip hop group which consists of members Clien Alcazar, Russell dela Fuente, Jomuel "Jom" Casem and Angelo Luigi "Crakky" Timog.

== History ==
Olongapo-based rappers Russel dela Fuente and Angelo Luigi "Crakky" Timog both met in college and formed the group. The duo then found Jom and Clien on a social media app singing and after seeing their potential, invited them to join the group.

Jomuel Casem, residing in Canada and Clien Alcazar, from Italy both have their Filipino roots from their parents and collaborated with their songs via email.

In 2018, the group released their first single titled "Bagay Tayo". In 2019, they released another single titled "Dalaga" (not associated with Arvey de Vera's song of the same title), in which a challenge called #DalagangFilipinaChallenge surfaced online. Later that same year, they signed a recording contract with Viva Records.

== Discography ==
=== Singles ===
- "Bagay Tayo" (2018)
- "Gimmie Tonight" (2018)
- "Seloso" (with Xaje) (2018)
- "Dalaga" (2019)
- "Dulo" (2019)
- "Carousel" (with Yuri) (2019)
- "Kahit Na" (2019)
- "Miracle Nights" (with L.A Goons & Peso Mercado) (2019)
- "NAIA" (with Because) (2019)
- "One Night" (2019)
- "One Way" (2019)
- "Exchange Gift" (2019)
- "Pagsuko" (2020)
- Sulyap ( 2020)
- Wag Muna (2020) feat(Crakky) and ( Soulstice)
- Love you ( with Jomuel Casem)
- Buti ka pa masaya ka feat Jomuel Casem) and (Angelo Luigi ''Crakky'' Timog)
- Mainam feat Crakky Timog
- Crush (2020)
- Sana'y Mapasakin (2021) (with LA GOON$)
- Hook Up (2022)
- Boyfriend (2024)

== Awards and nominations ==
Award ceremony	Year	Category	Nominee(s)/work(s)	Result	Ref.
PMPC Star Awards for Music	2019	Rap Artist of the Year	"Dalaga"	Nominated	
PMPC Star Awards for Music	2019	Song of the Year	"Dalaga"	Nominated	
