= Honcho (rapper) =

Filipino rapper

- Born: Mark Ezekiel Maglasang; June 13, 1995 (age 31); Consolacion, Cebu, Philippines
- Other names: Bosx1ne (formerly); The Great Honcho (Note: YouTube channel username.)
- Occupations: Rapper; singer-songwriter
- Years active: 2012–present
- Spouse: Erika Tolosa Maglasang
- Musical career
- Genres: Pinoy hip hop; trap
- Instrument: Vocals
- Labels: Ex Battalion Music (2012–2022) (Note: Member status disputed.); Viva Records; DeeFyre Records; NOVWLZ (Note: Pronounced no-vowels.)
- Formerly of: Ex Battalion; Kakaiboys (Note: Kakaiboys is a sub-unit of the Filipino hip-hop collective Ex Battalion. The group is composed of Skusta Clee, Flow G, and then-member Honcho (formerly Bosx1ne).)

YouTube information
- Channel: TheGreatHoncho
- Subscribers: 241 thousand
- Views: 9.4 million
- Last updated: December 26, 2025

Mark Ezekiel Maglasang (born June 13, 1995), also known mononymously as Honcho (formerly Bosx1ne; pronounced boss-one), is a Filipino rapper, singer and songwriter. He founded the Filipino hip-hop group Ex Battalion in 2012, whose collective gained nationwide prominence with hits such as "Hayaan Mo Sila" and "No Games", the only trap tracks that charted the Top 10 of the now-defunct Billboard PH Top 20. He reportedly left the group in 2022.

== Career ==
=== 2012—2021: Solo activities and Ex Battalion ===
Bosx1ne founded Ex Battalion who gained nationwide fame in 2018 after the release of "Hayaan Mo Sila", he changed his screen name to Honcho in mid-2020.

In April 2021, Honcho announced a lenten special EP entitled "Rosario", which he would be releasing on YouTube on a one-track-a-day arrangement from April 1 to 4, starting with the first song entitled "Ulap" featuring Jekkpot, Brando, and MC Einstein, and finally ending with the titular song itself.

=== 2022: Departure from Ex Battalion and solo emergence ===
In August 2022, Honcho apparently was "kicked out" of Ex Battalion after an alleged altercation with Skusta Clee, according to a cryptic post by the latter indicating Honcho has left the group and has since released solo work on his record label DeeFyre Records.

=== 2025—present: New singles, and label signing with NOVWLZ ===
In December 2025, Honcho was revealed as part of NOVWLZ (pronounced no-vowels), a new music label backed by the Viva Music Group, marking the artist's return to both the music scene and Viva Records. Part of the label's first set of roster included hip-hop acts ronrookie, Vambre, Bad Dee, Ram Millr, Ricochét, Wolbsgvng, Kiervy, Aliya, and TRA₱ BOY$.

On the same month, Honcho released "Disorder" as part of the label launch. A self-produced track together with NOVWLZ co-founder Archie Malate, "Disorder" is described as a hard-hitting, beat-heavy single that captures the chaos, conflict, and clarity of navigating a world that constantly pulls you in different directions by entertainment publication Pikapika. From one track to another, "Disorder" was followed by the release of "Talk To Me" (featuring Tanikala) with an accompanying music video, which gained a hundred thousand views two weeks from release.

== Discography ==
=== Extended plays ===
List of extended plays with selected details
Title	Album Details	Ref.
Rosario	Released: April 4, 2021 (PH); Label: Ex Battalion Music; Format: digital download, streaming media; Track listing: 1. "Ulap" (feat. Jekkpot, Brando, MC Einstein); 2. "Yakapin" (feat. JRoa); 3. "Pagkakamali (Live Version)"; 4. "Rosario" (feat. Flow G, Skusta Clee)	
M.E (Marcus & Ethan)	Released: November 23, 2023 (PH); Label: DeeFyre Records; Format: digital download, streaming media; Track listing: 1. "247"; 2. "Little One"; 3. "Liam"	

=== As a lead artist ===
==== As Bosx1ne ====
Title	Year	Album	Label	Ref.
"Aayusin Kita" (feat. Mckoy, Emcee Rhenn, Jekkpot)	2015	Non-album singles	Ex Battalion Music	
"Fuck Buddy" (featuring Skusta Clee)	2016	Non-album singles	Ex Battalion Music	
"Number One Rule" (featuring H Beat)	2017	Non-album singles	Ex Battalion Music	
"Di Na Muna"	2018	Non-album singles	Ex Battalion Music	
"Miss Flawless" (with Flow G featuring Sachzna)	2019	Non-album singles	Ex Battalion Music	

==== As Honcho ====
Title	Year	Album	Label	Ref.
"Flower" (featuring Bullet-D)	2020	Non-album singles	Ex Battalion Music	
"Pasensya Na" (featuring Jekkpot, Skusta Clee)	2020	Non-album singles	Ex Battalion Music	
"Kasalanan"	2022	Non-album singles	Ex Battalion Music/DeeFyre Records	
"Tamang Panahon" (featuring Floydiebanks, Thugprince)	2022	Non-album singles	DeeFyre Records	
"KATAWAN" (with Jemay Santiago, BLuNaYr featuring EIJ)	2023	Non-album singles	Independent	
"Kaya Pala"	2024	Non-album singles	DeeFyre Records	
"Captain"	2024	Non-album singles	DeeFyre Records	
"Kasal Kana"	2024	Non-album singles	DeeFyre Records	
"Wag Kang Tanga" (with Hambog Ng Sagpro)	2025	Non-album singles	Asero Records	
"GateKups" (with Ritzz)	2025	Non-album singles	DeeFyre Records	
"Ginto"	2025	Non-album singles	DeeFyre Records	
"Sobrang Latina" (with DollaPooch and Kairos Graphein)	2025	Non-album singles	HighLife Records	
"Disorder"	2025	Non-album singles	NOVWLZ	
"Talk To Me" (featuring Tanikala)	2025	Non-album singles	NOVWLZ	
"Pupunasan Baby"	2026	Non-album singles	DeeFyre Records	
''Rhonike"	2026	Non-album singles	DeeFyre Records	

== See also ==
- Filipino hip hop
- Ex Battalion
