= Ex Battalion =

Filipino hip hop group

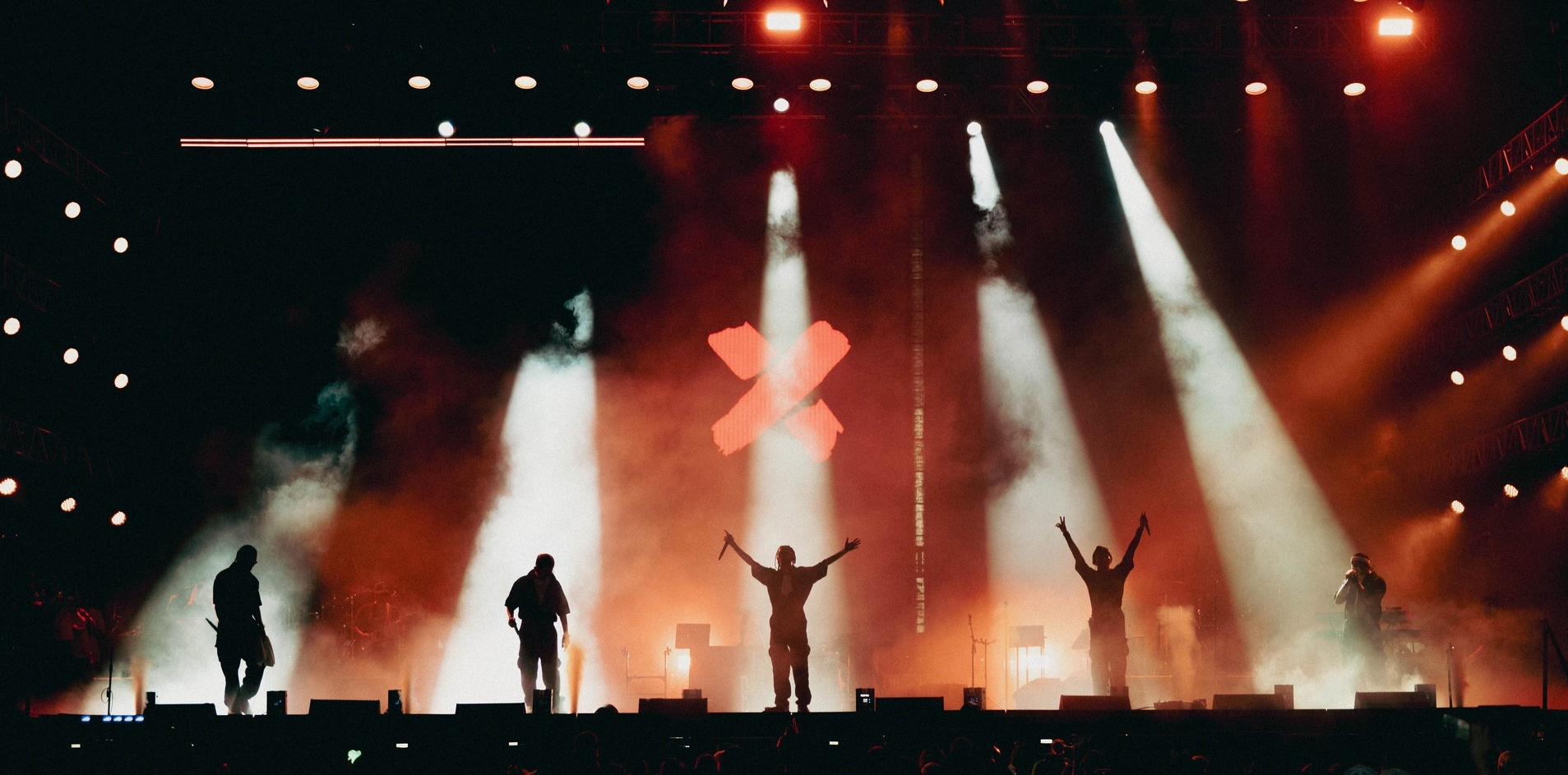
- Ex Battalion at the Aurora Music Festival in 2025. (Note: As surprise guest artist.) (From left to right: Brando, Emcee Rhenn, Flow G, Skusta Clee, and King Badger)

Background information
- Also known as: Jekkpot Battalion (formerly); EXB
- Origin: Muntinlupa, Philippines
- Genres: OPM; Pinoy hip-hop; Hip-hop; Trap; R&B; Pop
- Works: Discography
- Years active: 2012–2022; 2025–present
- Labels: Ex Battalion Music; Viva Records; Panty Droppaz League (Note: Ex Battalion's partner label); GMA Music (2017–2018)
- Spinoffs: Kakaiboys (Note: Kakaiboys is a sub-unit of the Filipino hip-hop collective Ex Battalion. The group is composed of Skusta Clee, Flow G, and then-member Honcho (formerly Bosx1ne).)
- Members: Skusta Clee; Flow G; King Badger; Emcee Rhenn; Brando; See List of Ex Battalion other members
- Past members: Honcho (Note: Member status disputed since 2022.)

YouTube information
- Channel: Ex Battalion Music
- Subscribers: 5.65 million
- Views: 2.54 billion
- Last updated: December 26, 2025

Logo
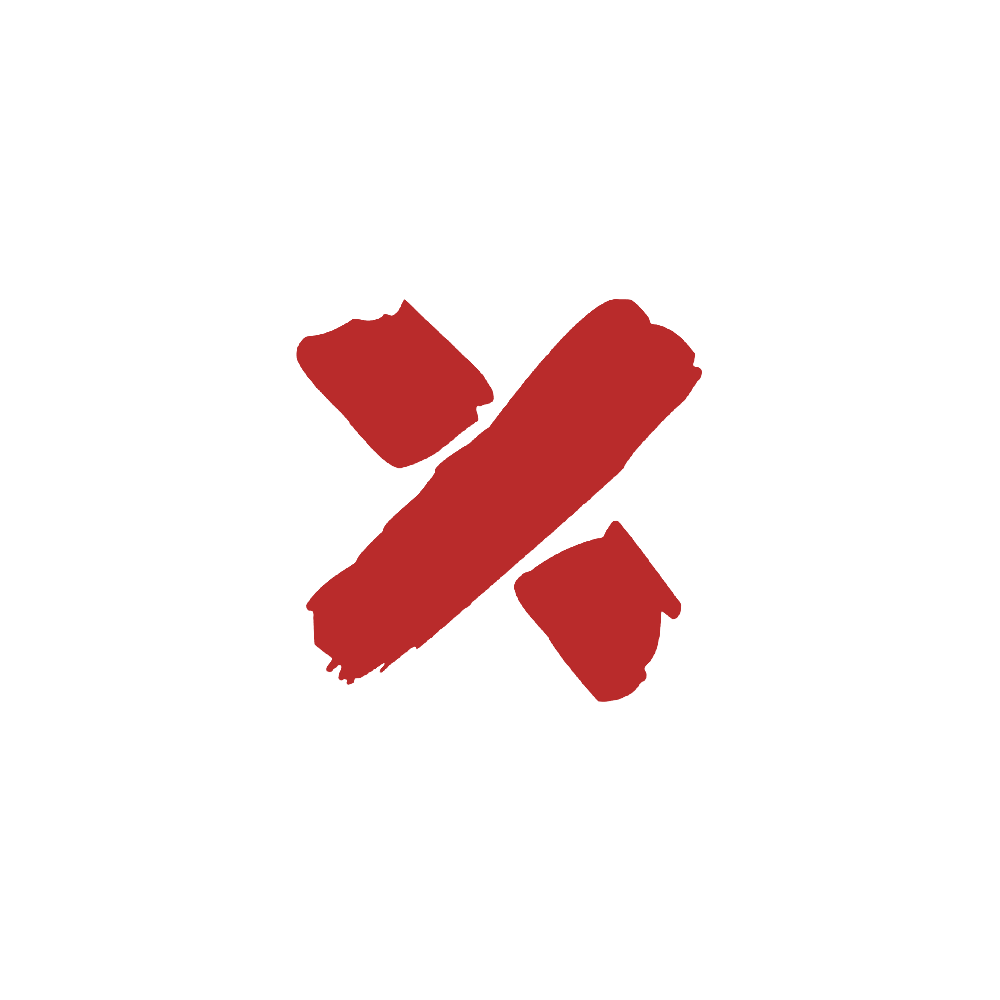

Ex Battalion (also abbreviated as EXB; formerly Jekkpot Battalion) is a Filipino hip hop collective from Muntinlupa City, Philippines, primarily known for their hit single "Hayaan Mo Sila" that went #2 on the Billboard Philippine Top 20. The group has numerous local hits that dominated Philippine social media and they are credited for "revolutionizing" Pinoy hip hop to a new modern sound.

The hip-hop collective currently consists of Skusta Clee, Flow G, Brando, Emcee Rhenn, and King Badger as the main members. Other members include JRoa, Yuridope, Bullet-D, Jnske, Jekkpot, Huddass, Cent, and E.I.J. The group was founded in 2012 by Jekkpot, Cent, and Honcho, whose stage name was Bosx1ne at the time, who reportedly left the group in late 2022.

To date, they have garnered a total of over 2 billion views and over 5 million subscribers on YouTube. All members have also appeared in television and film, they starred in their first box-office feature "Sons of Nanay Sabel" in 2019, although it was not commercially successful.

== Name ==
The name Ex Battalion is derived from a coalition of rappers, representing ex-members of different groups. Ex means former, while Battalion means a large group or unit.

Originally formed by Jekkpot, the group was initially named as Jekkpot Battalion. It was later changed to Ex Battalion, under Bosx1ne's leadership, after the collective built a reputation in rap contests, which prevented the group under the former name from joining competitions.

== History ==
=== 2012-2016: Formation, early releases and rise to prominence ===
In 2012, Ex Battalion was formed and founded by Bosx1ne (now known as Honcho), and rap battle emcees Jekkpot and Cent as a rap battle group, both of the latter left before their establishment as a music group but had joined several barangay rap battles before being into music. In January 2016, the group was formed into a musical group and as a hip hop collective and released their first album entitled "X" on digital platforms. They eventually recruited several artists to join their group after the release. The first three members were Bosx1ne, social media personality Jon Gutierrez (who performs under the mononym "King Badger") and Flow-G. Bosx1ne then invited former reality talent show participant JRoa and O.C. Dawgs member Skusta Clee to collaborate in their first track "Kakaiba" until eventually becoming members.

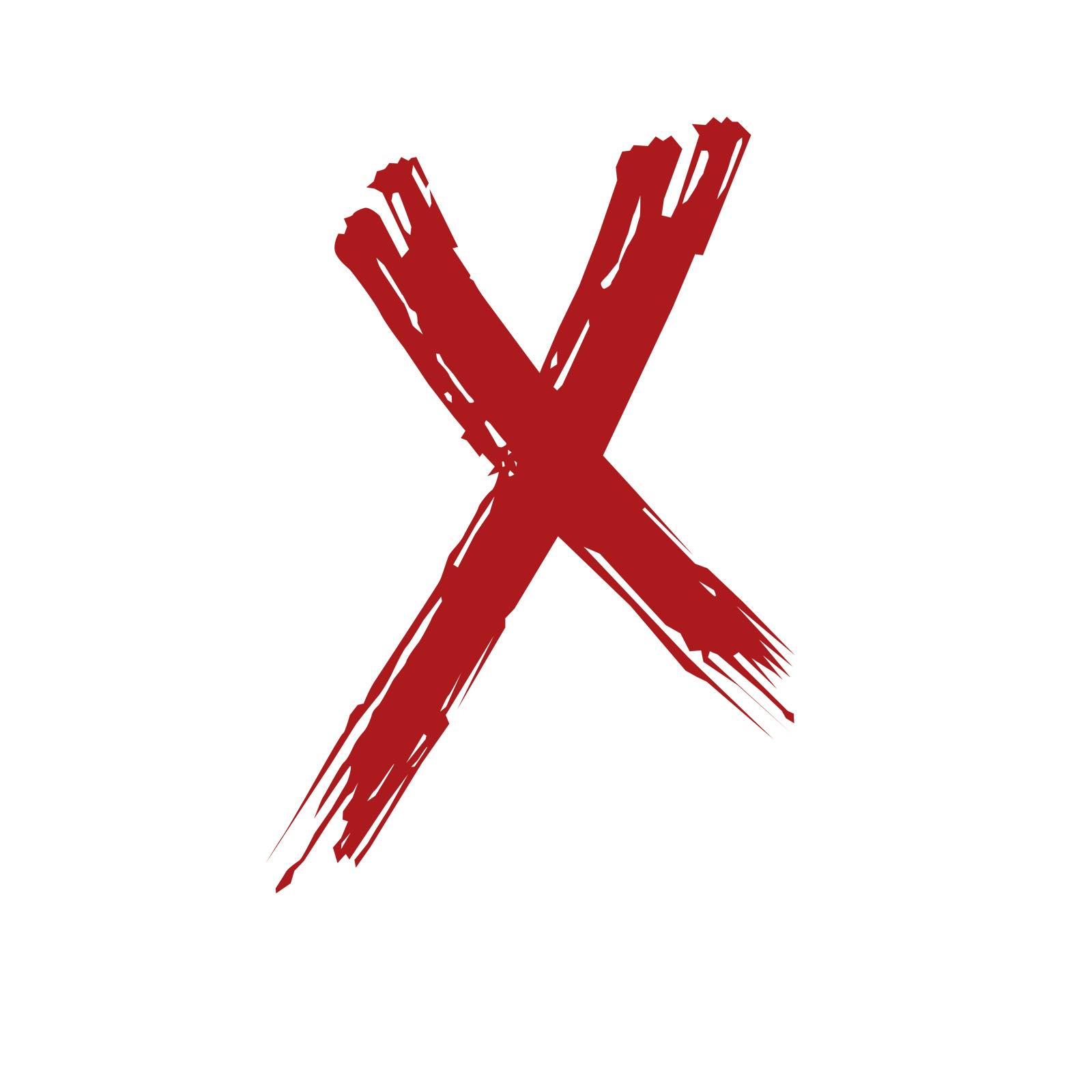
Logo used from 2012 to 2022 (Note: While the group may have changed their logo in 2025, this logo can still be seen across the collective's social media channels, including YouTube.)

On 25 September 2016, three months after the release of their first smash-hit single, they released another single called "No Games". The track's music video was immediately uploaded on YouTube and subsequently garnering over 16 million views in a span of a just two months.

On 6 December 2016, they released "Tell Me" and the track's music video on YouTube. Social media personality Toni Fowler was featured on the video which helped the track to gain initial traction.

=== 2017–2019: Sub-unit and peak popularity ===
In January 2017, the collective scored their first Billboard Philippine Top 20 hit as "No Games" entered the local chart and peaked at number 10 after several weeks.

However, on 7 November 2017, JRoa announced his intent to leave the group to focus on his solo musical career after releasing just one album in the label and appearing in several songs with the collective. Roa said that the group will still be the same "with or without him". Other members like Flow G and Bosx1ne accepted Roa's decision and pledged to support him on his future plans. Roa (which renamed and reverted as John Roa), joined Viva Records as a solo artist. On the same day, the group also released "Hayaan Mo Sila", inspired by DJ Khaled's "I'm the One".

On 3 January 2018, the official music video of "Hayaan Mo Sila" was taken down by YouTube after hitting almost twenty million views due to a copyright claim by the producer of the beat, Diamond Style, who claims that Ex Battalion only purchased a $25 lease which covers up to 2,000 streams and up to 250,000 views only. After the event, speculations swirled online regarding the alleged use of the beat without permission; Ex Battalion explained and admitted that they have not purchased the exclusive rights of the beat by which they only got from the producer's YouTube channel. After a few days, it was also removed from streaming services and digital stores. It was eventually restored in the stores including the music video on YouTube, after the issue was resolved two weeks later. Due to the massive attention, the track also rose up the charts, peaking at #2 on the Philippine Top 20. "Hayaan Mo Sila" was poised to be number one the following week after hitting #2. However, Billboard Philippines then ceased from publishing weekly charts.

On 12 March 2018, the collective released their new single entitled "SouthBoys" on YouTube in another collaboration with O.C. Dawgs. Special appearances in the video included Jnske, and Bullet-D. Two of which are from O.C. Dawgs. The video became the number 1 trend in the YouTube PH platform several hours after the upload. On 13 March 2018, it was announced that the collective will be handled and managed by Filipino comedian Ai-Ai delas Alas, who they previously collaborated with in the track entitled "Walang Pinipili" (lit. Choosing Nobody), after signing a management contract.

On 9 April 2018, the collective released "Unreleased (Mahirap Na)" as Kakaiboys, a sub-unit which featured only three members from the group, composed of Skusta Clee, Flow G, and Bosx1ne. The music video was released on the group label's official YouTube channel.

On early 2019, Delas Alas resigned as the group's manager. Delas Alas reasoned her inability to handle the ego of certain members who are "behaving unprofessionally". After Ex Battalion starred in their first box-office film, Sons of Nanay Sabel in May 2019, it was reported that Bosx1ne announced his separation from the group on 9 May 2019, citing personal reasons in an apparent publicity stunt for their movie. However, Bosx1ne remaining with the collective was confirmed when he still appeared with his own verse in the music video of their single entitled "Pakinabang" which they released on 5 August 2019. Bosx1ne changed his screen name to Honcho in mid-2020.

Outside music, Flow G launched a business venture "Brand for 199x" & has released a track named "Deym" with a video advertisement, involving Skusta Clee as an ambassador of the brand. After the upload, Netizens slamed the two members for allegedly plagiarizing the song "Ddaeng" by BTS, released on SoundCloud in 2018, and have made #SkustaCleeisGoingtoJailParty a trending topic on Philippine Twitter. However, a few weeks later, the group's management denied allegations and stated that the two pieces are 'inherently different' and claimed that they used a generic triplet flow. The management also added that "There will be no jail time involved even if there is a conviction of copyright infringement".

=== 2020–2022: JRoa's return to the group and conflict with Honcho ===
On 14 December 2020, after being spotted hanging out with the group again after a long time, John Roa (or simply JRoa) released his new single "Woah" under Ex Battalion Music and Viva Records, marking his return to the group as the vocalist.

On 4 February 2021, Flow G teamed up with Gloc-9's talent management Asintada.

In April 2021, Honcho announced a lenten special EP titled "Rosario", which he would be releasing on YouTube one track a day from 1 to 4 April, starting with the first song entitled "Ulap" featuring Jekkpot, Brando, and MC Einstein.

On 5 April 2021, the collective released their new single entitled "Yearly" on YouTube with special appearances of the sub-members in the video included Jekkpot, Yuri Dope, MC Einstein, Huddass, and E.I.J., the collaborative track is produced by Flip-D and Thyro Alfaro. OneMusicPH described it as "a piercing and elaborately structured diss track."

In November 2021, the group announced that they will be holding their first major stage concert at Smart Araneta Coliseum, with the whole collective performing including sub-members from the Ex Battalion Music label, their first show is entitled "EVOLUXION".

In August 2022, Ex Battalion released their new track "Chismis", with the lyrics clearly referencing the group's founder Honcho being ousted from the group. It was reported that Honcho had an altercation with the group about transparency with their earnings. After the incident, Skusta Clee announced that "the group is still complete" in a cryptic post with a photo of all members without their founder, indicating Honcho has left the group.

Since then, Honcho has released solo work on his own after succeeding releases by Ex Battalion without him. Although, no member has spoken up confirming the issues and there were no legal action taken to court regarding the matter from anyone in both parties.

=== 2025-present: Post-Honcho era, "Best Seller" album and new logo ===
On April 11, 2025, Ex Battalion released seven music videos in less than a day. Majority of the music videos were released on a one-track-an-hour arrangement from 1:00 PM to 7:00 PM, starting with the first song "Fun", which featured the five main members of the group (Flow G, Brando, Skusta Clee, King Badger and Emcee Rhenn), and ending with "Legacy", which also featured the same five from the collective.

While most of the tracks featured the main members, Yuri Dope was featured in one of the songs from the album titled "For Me" as a sub-member. The release arrangement suggested that the group is releasing an album after a two-year hiatus since 2022.

The album name was later revealed on YouTube, and was up on streaming platforms a week later. It was also the first album without the presence of the group's founder, Honcho.

Meanwhile, a new logo, celebrating the return, was also unveiled at the end of "Fun" music video and is used at succeeding music video releases and concerts.

== Members ==
Current members

- Skusta Clee – rapper, vocalist
- Flow G – rapper
- Brando – rapper
- Emcee Rhenn – rapper
- King Badger – rapper

Past members

- Honcho (status disputed since 2022) – founder, rapper

Other members

- JRoa – vocalist, rapper
- Bullet D (also of O.C. Dawgs) – rapper
- Jnske (also of O.C. Dawgs) – rapper
- Yuridope – rapper
- MC Einstein (Note: MC Einstein was not included on the Ex Battalion: Evoluxion concert in 2021 which supposedly featured every member from the group, although there was no announcement regarding his group departure.) – vocalist
- KentMNL (Note: KentMNL was not included on the Ex Battalion: Evoluxion concert in 2021 which supposedly featured every member from the group, although there was no announcement regarding his group departure. KentMNL is known for "Need You" and "Do That For Me", both under the Ex Battalion the Concert album in 2017) – rapper
- Ritzz (Note: Ritzz was not included on the Ex Battalion: Evoluxion concert in 2021 which supposedly featured every member from the group, although there was no announcement regarding his group departure.) – rapper
- Jackmow (Note: Jackmow was not included on the Ex Battalion: Evoluxion concert in 2021 which supposedly featured every member from the group, although there was no announcement regarding his group departure.) – rapper
- Jekkpot – rapper
- Huddass (also of 187 Mobstaz) – rapper
- Cent – rapper
- Reid – hypeman, music video actor

== Other ventures ==
=== Endorsements ===
Year	Product	Company	Notes	Ref.
2018	"RRJ x Ex Battalion"	Rough Rider Jeans	Ex Battalion as brand ambassadors	
2019	"Miss Flawless"	Frontrow International	Ex Battalion and Frontrow International's promotional jingle for Luxxe White	

== Discography ==
=== Albums ===
List of albums with selected details
Title	Album Details	Ref.
X	Released: February 3, 2016 (PH); Label: Ex Battalion Music; Format: digital download, streaming media; Track listing: 1. "Mukhang Malabo"; 2. "Nakakabaliw"; 3. "Second Chance"; 4. "Tagapagligtas"; 5. "San Ba Ako Nagkulang"; 6. "Dahil Sayo"; 7. "Darating Din"; 8. "Hindi Lahat"; 9. "Makakabawi Rin"; 10. "Tuloy Lang"; 11. "Twerk"; 12. "Rated X (Remix)"; 13. "Hit 'n Run"; 14. "Nakaraan"; 15. "Balik Sa Umpisa"	
Ex Battalion the Concert	Released: August 19, 2017 (PH); Label: Ex Battalion Music; Format: digital download, streaming media; Track listing: 1. "Hayaan Mo Sila (Inspired by I'm the One)" (Note: "Hayaan Mo Sila" has three versions available on the group's YouTube channel: (1) the music video version with King Badger's verse, (2) the initial audio version with JRoa verse, and (3) a version for the female audience. The later is the group's response to criticisms around the music video version's portrayal of women.); 2. "Fallin'" (feat. Muffin); 3. "Day Dreaming"; 4. "Frontpage" (feat. Abaddon); 5. "Walang Tayo"; 6. "Rose"; 7. "Aagawin"; 8. "Do That For Me"; 9. "Kakaiba" (feat. Skusta Clee); 10. "No Games" (feat. Skusta Clee); 11. "Tell Me"; 12. "Need You"; 13. "Fuck Buddy" (feat. Skusta Clee); 14. "Come with Me" (feat. Bosx1ne, Flow G, King Badger & JRoa); 15. "Di Ako Fuckboy" (feat. Agsunta); 16. "Bootyful" (feat. JRoa, Emcee Rhenn, Flow G, Brando & Bosx1ne)	
Best Seller	Released: April 11, 2025 (PH); Label: Ex Battalion Music; Format: digital download, streaming media; Track listing: 1. "Fun"; 2. "43x"; 3. "For Me" (with member Yuridope); 4. "All Night"; 5. "Hamig"; 6. "Make Her Dance"; 7. "Legacy"	

=== Extended plays ===
List of extended plays with selected details
Title	Album Details	Ref.
6 Years	Released: August 6, 2018 (PH); Label: Ex Battalion Music, Viva Records; Format: digital download, streaming media; Track listing: 1. "Ikaw Kase"; 2. "Ginalingan"; 3. "Nandyan Agad Ako"; 4. "Mahal Mo Ba Ko" (Note: It was initially part of the EP but was later removed.) (feat. Mikkae Ella)	

=== Singles ===
==== As a lead artist ====
List of singles, with year released and album name shown
Year	Title	Peak chart position	Album	Ref.
Year	Title	PHL 20	Album	
2016	"Kakaiba" (featuring Skusta Clee)	—	Ex Battalion the Concert	
2016	"No Games" (featuring King Badger and Skusta Clee)	—	Non-album single	
2016	"Tell Me"	—	Ex Battalion the Concert	
2017	"Need You"	—	Ex Battalion the Concert	
2017	"Sana Ikaw Na Nga" (featuring Bryan Chong)	—	Non-album single	
2017	"Bootyful" (featuring JRoa, Emcee Rhenn, Flow G, Brando and Bosx1ne)	—	Ex Battalion the Concert	
2017	"Come With Me" (featuring Bosx1ne, Flow G, King Badger and JRoa)	—	Ex Battalion the Concert	
2018	"Hayaan Mo Sila" (featuring O.C. Dawgs)	2	Ex Battalion the Concert	
2018	"Southboys" (featuring O.C. Dawgs)	—	Non-album singles	
2018	"Follow My Lead" (featuring Chicser and Sachzna Laparan)	—	Non-album singles	
2018	"Unreleased (Mahirap Na)" (as Kakaiboys)	—	Non-album singles	
2018	"Superhero Mo" (featuring Alden Richards)	—	Non-album singles	
2018	"Ikaw Kase"	—	6 Years (EP)	
2019	"Ginalingan"	—	6 Years (EP)	
2019	"SingSing"	—	Abay Babes (Original Movie Soundtrack)	
2019	"Sama-Sama"	—	Sons Of Nanay Sabel (Original Movie Soundtrack)	
2019	"Pakinabang"	—	Non-album singles	
2019	"Baby Cakes (Kiss Mo 'Ko)" (featuring Bullet-D of O.C. Dawgs)	—	Non-album singles	
2019	"Miss Flawless"	—	Non-album singles	
2020	"Bounty (Makukuha Rin Kita)"	—	Non-album singles	
2021	"Yearly"	—	Non-album singles	
2021	"Atin"	—	Non-album singles	
2022	"Bullet Sun"	—	Non-album singles	
2022	"Chismis"	—	Non-album singles	
2022	"We The Best"	—	Non-album singles	
2022	"Idol (TikTok)"	—	Non-album singles	
2025	"Fun"	—	Best Seller	

=== Charts ===
Chart Performance
Year	Title	Peak (Philippine Top 20)	Peak (Philippine Hot 100)
2016	"No Games"	10	–
2017	"Hayaan Mo Sila"	2	10

== Filmography ==
=== Films ===
Year	Film	Role	Notes	Film production
2019	Sons of Nanay Sabel (S.O.N.S.)	James Dela Cruz / Izzy Dela Cruz / Troll Dela Cruz / Bhoy Dela Cruz / Justin Dela Cruz / Bieber Dela Cruz	Debut film appearance and major movie project	Viva Films

=== Television ===
- ExB Rules! (Under GMA ONE: ONline Exclusives), 2018
- Kapuso Mo, Jessica Soho, 2018
- Celebrity Bluff, 2018
- Magpakailanman, 2018
- iJuander, 2018
- Daig Kayo Ng Lola Ko, 2018
- Inday Will Always Love You, 2018
- My Guitar Princess, 2018
- Victor Magtanggol, 2018
- Daddy's Gurl, 2019
- Studio 7, 2019
- Eat Bulaga, 2020

== Awards and nominations ==
Award ceremony	Year	Category	Nominee(s)/work(s)	Result	Ref.
Wish Music Awards	2018	Wish Hip-Hop Song of the Year	"Hayaan Mo Sila" (with O.C. Dawgs)	Nominated	
PMPC Star Awards for Music	2019	Rap Artist of the Year	"Superhero Mo" (feat. Alden Richards)	Won	
PMPC Star Awards for Music	2021	Music Video of the Year	"Miss Flawless" (Bosx1ne, Flow G feat. Sachzna)	Won	
PMPC Star Awards for Music	2021	Rap Artist of the Year	"Miss Flawless" (Bosx1ne, Flow G feat. Sachzna)	Won	
