= Jon Gutierrez =

Filipino rapper and actor

- Born: Jon Alvie Gutierrez
- Occupations: Rapper; actor
- Years active: 2016–present
- Spouse: Jelai Andres (m. 2018; ann. 2026)
- Musical career
- Genres: Pinoy hip hop; trap
- Labels: Ex Battalion Music; Viva Records; Panty Droppaz League
- Member of: Ex Battalion

YouTube information
- Channel: King B
- Subscribers: 316 thousand
- Views: 7.6 million
- Last updated: December 27, 2025

Jon Alvie Gutierrez, professionally known as King Badger, is a Filipino rapper and actor. He is a member of the hip-hop collective Ex Battalion.

== Personal life and career ==
Gutierrez's father is British, and his mother is of Filipino origin. Gutierrez is a member of the Filipino hip hop collective Ex Battalion who is also known as King Badger since 2016, who performed in some television programs of GMA Network. On October 6, 2018, Gutierrez finally married his longtime girlfriend Jelai Andres.

In 2019, Gutierrez was accused of marital infidelity by his wife, social media influencer and actress Jelai Andres, who claimed that he cheated on her with Toni Fowler.

In 2021, Gutierrez was involved again in a similar issue Andres filed a concubinage complaint against Gutierrez in the Department of Justice, in Quezon City, on June 1, 2021.

On May 10, 2021, Gutierrez released a track entitled 'SRRY' with an accompanying music video under the Ex Battalion YouTube channel. The piece depicts his regrets about his previous relationship with Jelai Andres.

== Discography ==
=== Singles ===
Year	Title	Album
2019	Walang Gana	Non-album singles
2020	Miloves (Otw Sayo)	Non-album singles
2021	SRRY	Non-album singles
2023	Sober	Non-album singles

== Filmography ==
=== Television ===
Year	Title	Role	Notes	Ref.
2018	Victor Magtanggol	Mario Magtanggol		
2019–2020	One of the Baes	Jong	Cameo	
2021	Owe My Love	Eddie Ganondin		
