= Flow G =

Filipino rapper and songwriter

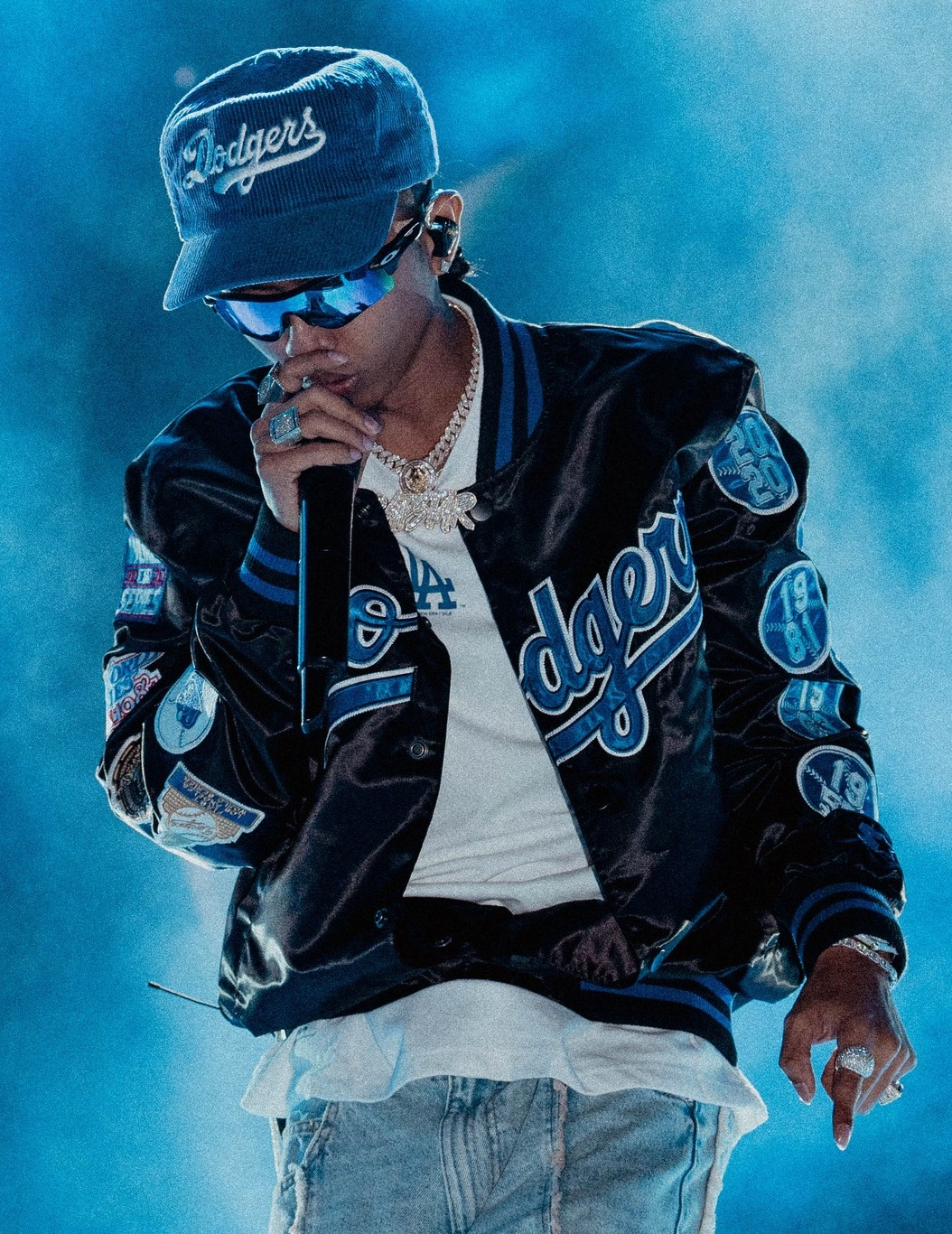
- Flow G in 2025
- Born: Archie Basilio dela Cruz; August 15, 1996 (age 30); Alabang, Muntinlupa, Philippines
- Occupations: Rapper; singer; songwriter
- Years active: 2016–present
- Partner: Angelica Jane Yap (2018–present)
- Musical career
- Genres: Hip hop; trap
- Instrument: Vocals
- Labels: Ex Battalion Music; Panty Droppaz League; Viva Records; Asintada
- Member of: Ex Battalion; Kakaiboys (Note: Kakaiboys is a sub-unit of the Filipino hip-hop collective Ex Battalion. The group is composed of Skusta Clee, Flow G, and then-member Honcho (formerly Bosx1ne).)

YouTube information
- Channel: FLOW G
- Subscribers: 2.66 million
- Views: 929.7 million
- Last updated: December 27, 2025

Archie Basilio dela Cruz (born August 15, 1996), known professionally as Flow G, is a Filipino rapper, singer and songwriter. He rose to prominence as a member of the Filipino hip-hop collective Ex Battalion and for his hit solo releases, including "Rapstar" (Note: The music video of "Rapstar" was released in December 31, 2022. It was made available to digital streaming platforms on January 2, 2023.) and "Praning", both released in 2022, and "Nandyan Agad Ako" from the Ex Battalion extended play (EP) "6 Years" in 2018.

He bagged the Wish Artist of the Year and Spotify Artist of the Year awards at the 9th Wish Music Awards in 2024. In the same year, he won the Rap Artist of the Year award at the 16th PMPC Star Awards for Music.

== Career ==
=== 2020—2021: Solo activities and rise to prominence ===
On January 17, 2020, Gloc-9 released a collaborative track entitled "Halik" featuring Flow G. In March 2020, they performed the song on Wish 107.5, and the performance dominated the charts, reaching the No. 1 spot on YouTube's trending chart in the Philippines a few hours after the upload. On April 15, 2020, the video became a trend for a third week in a row, alongside Gloc-9's 24 bars challenge video.

On February 3, 2020, Flow G released his single "Araw-Araw Love" (lit. Every Day Love) and the track's music video, with a special appearance in the video to feature his YouTuber girlfriend Angelica Jane Yap, also known as Pastillas Girl on the show It's Showtime. It dominated the charts and took YouTube Philippine's #3 spot a day after the upload.

In December 2020, Flow G's single "Araw-Araw Love" became one of the 'most viewed' music videos on YouTube PH, which has almost 73 million views to date, topping the South Korean group Blackpink who came in second. As of now, it is still one of the most streamed tracks so far.

On February 4, 2021, Flow G joined Gloc-9's talent management Asintada.

On April 19, 2021, Flow G along with JRoa released their single "Hangga't Maaari" in which the track portrays the changes in a relationship. The track then dominated YouTube PH's trending chart sitting in the No. 3 spot and gaining over two million views in a day.

On April 26, 2021, Flow G released a collaborative track entitled "Ibong Adarna" featuring Gloc-9. The video then garnered millions of views in a day. This was his first single under Gloc-9's talent management Asintada, along with his first track featuring Gloc-9. He published the song on digital platforms (including Apple Music) days later under Viva Records Corporation, making it his return to the label.

=== 2022—2024: "Rapstar" and peak popularity ===
On December 31, 2022, the music video for "Rapstar" was released. In the track, Flow G dishes out on how his effort, struggle, and planning led him to success, dismissing those waiting for him to fail and expressing commitment to fans, all while keeping the same attitude. Having accumulated over 171 million views to date, "Rapstar" has earned him a Wish Hip-hop Song of the Year award at the 9th Wish Music Awards in 2024. In the same year, he also bagged the Wish Artist of the Year and the Spotify KALYE Artist of the Year award, which won him three awards in total.

In May 2024, Flow G was tapped along with SunKissed Lola, and P-Pop groups SB19 and BINI as Puregold's brand ambassadors for their campaign 'Nasa Atin Ang Panalo,' which brought all four artists in one music video. The campaign also featured four separate versions of the song performed by each artist, with Flow G making his entry rap-centric.

On September 6, 2024, Flow G collaborated with Alhambra Light Brandy for a pre-meditated rap piece, making him the ambassador of the brand.

On October 28, 2024, Flow G's "Rapstar" won the Rap Artist of the Year award at the 16th PMPC Star Awards for Music.

On November 23, 2024, Flow G was tapped by Mobile Legends: Bang Bang to perform and compose the theme song for the MLBB M6 World Championship in the Philippines.

=== 2025—present: Debut solo album ===
On August 11, 2025, four days before his birthday, Flow G announced a vinyl release of his debut album "247" in a limited edition set. The album, featuring 12 tracks, explores the theme of a person's routine (being active 24 hours a day, seven days a week), hence the title "247". Part of the set includes a custom turntable designed by Austrian company Pro-Ject Audio Systems, with both the record and the record player being numbered to only 100 pieces worldwide, priced at Php 100,000.

The exclusive turntable set provided fans early access to the album, while the album was made available on streaming platforms on his birthday, August 15, 2025.

On August 16, 2025, Flow G announced that the 100-piece limited edition vinyl set had sold out. A day later, the album entered the Top 5 of Apple Music PH albums chart.

== Controversy ==
=== Brand for 199x ===
In September 2020, Flow G released a promotional track "Deym" to endorse their clothing line "Brand for 199x", involving fellow Ex Battalion member Skusta Clee as an ambassador of the brand. They were allegedly accused of plagiarizing the song "Ddaeng" by BTS, which was released on SoundCloud in 2018. Surprisingly, the group's management debunked allegations and made a clarification that the two songs are 'inherently different'. The manager also claimed that the artists used a generic flow and added that “parallel thinking among artists do happen and it cannot be avoided".

== Feud ==
=== Sixth Threat ===
On April 18, 2020, Flow G had beef with FlipTop Isabuhay 2019 Champion Sixth Threat. He released his diss track entitled "Unli", a response to "Pilipinong Wack" by 3 Digitz, a Sixth Threat group. A few weeks later, he released his second diss track entitled "Pasaload", a response to "Expired" by Sixth Threat, pointing out Flow G in the song. Netizens were suspicious of Gloc-19 for 'alluding' Sixth Threat on his social media accounts. Sixth Threat also called out Gloc-9 for being Flow G's 'ghost writer' in the making of "Pasaload".

== Other ventures ==
=== Endorsements ===
Year	Product	Company	Notes	Ref.
2023	"Hataw Mode Sa Sting"	Sting Philippines	Flow G, along with Alden Richards and Eruption T., as brand ambassadors	
2024	"Nasa Atin Ang Panalo"	Puregold	Flow G, along with SB19, BINI, and SunKissed Lola, as brand ambassadors	
2024	"G Ang Flow Alhambra"	Alhambra Light Brandy	Flow G as brand ambassador	
2024	"Pinas Pinakamalakas"	Mobile Legends: Bang Bang	Flow G as theme song artist for MLBB M6 World Championship (Philippines)	

== Discography ==
=== Studio albums ===
List of studio albums with selected details
Title	Album Details	Ref.
247	Released: August 15, 2025 (PH); Label: Panty Droppaz League; Format: Vinyl, digital download, streaming media; Track listing: 1. "Sargo"; 2. "Telebabad"; 3. "Amat Na"; 4. "247"; 5. "Big Dreams"; 6. "Gotchu"; 7. "8080"; 8. "Lokal"; 9. "Huh?"; 10. "Reply"; 11. "Una Lagi"; 12. "Ayos Ba?"	

=== Extended plays ===
List of extended plays with selected details
Title	Album Details	Ref.
Trifecta (with Skusta Clee)	Released: March 8, 2024 (PH); Label: Panty Droppaz League; Format: digital download, streaming media; Track listing: 1. "Angas"; 2. "Deserve"; 3. "Inggit"	

=== As a lead artist ===
Title	Year	Album	Ref.
"Nandyan Agad Ako"	2018	6 Years (EP) (with Ex Battalion)	
"Mabisa" (with Brown Squad)	2019	Non-album singles	
"Miss Flawless" (with Bosx1ne feat. Sachzna)	2019	Non-album singles	
"Araw-Araw Love"	2020	Non-album singles	
"Unli"	2020	Non-album singles	
"Pasaload"	2020	Non-album singles	
"Hangga't Maaari" (with JRoa)	2021	Non-album singles	
"Ibong Adarna" (featuring Gloc-9)	2021	Non-album singles	
"G Wolf"	2021	Non-album singles	
"Ebeb"	2021	Non-album singles	
"Batugan"	2022	Non-album singles	
"Praning"	2022	Non-album singles	
"Gaga" (with Skusta Clee, Yuri Dope)	2022	Non-album singles	
"Rapstar"	2022	Non-album singles	
"Diamond" (with JRoa)	2023	Non-album singles	
"High Score"	2023	Non-album singles	
"Laya" (featuring Skusta Clee)	2023	Non-album singles	
"Burgis" (with Hev Abi)	2024	Non-album singles	
"Business Talk"	2024	Non-album singles	
"Fullclip" (with Apekz)	2024	Non-album singles	
"Kasama" (with Chito Miranda)	2024	Non-album singles	
"Mala SV"	2025	Non-album singles	
"247"	2025	247	

==== As a featured artist ====
Year	Title
2018	Pauwi Nako (with O.C. Dawgs, Yuri Dope)
2019	Titig (with MC Einstein, Jekkpot, Yuri Dope)
2020	Halik (with Gloc-9)
2020	Mahal Mo Rin Ba Ako? (with LIRAH, Bosx1ne)
2020	Panalangin (with Nik Makino, Honcho)
2020	Pull Up (with H Beat, Honcho, Classiclove, NJ Ova, Hash One, Quad T)
2020	Nandito Lang Ako (with Skusta Clee, Jnske, Leslie, Honcho, Bullet D)
2020	Where Ya' From (with Tiny Montana, Raf Davis, Third Flo', Don Pao, Omar Baliw)
2020	Oops (with Yuri Dope)
2020	Bahala Ka (with MC Einstein, Jekkpot, Yuri Dope)
2021	Ballin' (with Paul N Ballin)
2021	Pare (with Abaddon)
2021	Stig (with Bugoy na Koykoy)
2022	Pagmamahal Mo Lang (with O.C. Dawgs)
2022	Eyes On The Price (with Pricetagg)
2022	Moon (with Nik Makino)
2022	Kamusta (with Shanti Dope)
2022	Parinig (with Jekkpot, Jackmow, Brando, Yuri Dope)
2022	Dem Dayz (with YB Neet)
2022	Talk To Me Nice (with SV Squad, Kris Delano, Tiny Montana, Jekkpot, Jackmow, Brando)
2022	Bahay Yugyugan (with Gloc-9)
2022	Panis (with Yuri Dope)
2023	Atin-Atin Lang (with Al James)
2023	Alabambang (with Paul Cassimir)
2023	Civic (with Emcee Rhenn)
2023	Karanasan (with Guddhist Gunatita)
2023	Pikit (with Loonie)
2023	Yung Naniniwala Sa'min (with Juanthugs, Mike Kosa, OG Sacred, Mista Blaze, Kemikal Ali)
2023	Paumanhin (with Adie)
2024	We Made It (with Nik Makino)
2024	Brrt Pow! (with Yuri Dope, Emcee Rhenn)
2024	Top Dawg (with Gat Putch)
2025	Swanton Bomb (with Yuri Dope)
2025	PNYT (with Nobita)
2026	Since Day One (with Skusta Clee)

== Awards and nominations ==
Award ceremony	Year	Category	Nominee(s)/work(s)	Result	Ref.
Filipino Music Awards	2025	People's Choice Awards – Artist	Flow G	Nominated	
Filipino Music Awards	2026	People's Choice Awards – Artist	Flow G	Nominated	
Filipino Music Awards	2026	Song of the Year	"Since Day One" (Skusta Clee feat. Flow G)	Won	
Filipino Music Awards	2026	Hip-hop Song of the Year	"Since Day One" (Skusta Clee feat. Flow G)	Won	
Filipino Music Awards	2026	People's Choice Awards – Song	"Since Day One" (Skusta Clee feat. Flow G)	Nominated	
PMPC Star Awards for Music	2021	Rap Artist of the Year	"Miss Flawless" (Bosx1ne, Flow G feat. Sachzna)	Won	
PMPC Star Awards for Music	2021	Music Video of the Year	"Miss Flawless" (Bosx1ne, Flow G feat. Sachzna)	Won	
PMPC Star Awards for Music	2021	Collaboration of the Year	"Miss Flawless" (Bosx1ne, Flow G feat. Sachzna)	Nominated	
PMPC Star Awards for Music	2024	Collaboration of the Year	"Ibong Adarna" (feat. Gloc-9)	Nominated	
PMPC Star Awards for Music	2024	Hip-hop Artist of the Year	"Ibong Adarna" (feat. Gloc-9)	Nominated	
PMPC Star Awards for Music	2024	Rap Artist of the Year	"Batugan"	Nominated	
PMPC Star Awards for Music	2024	Rap Artist of the Year	"Rapstar"	Won	
Wish Music Awards	2020	Wishclusive Hip-hop Performance of the Year	"Pauwi Nako" (O.C. Dawgs feat. Flow G, Yuri Dope)	Won	
Wish Music Awards	2022	Wish Hip-hop Song of the Year	"Ibong Adarna" (Flow G feat. Gloc-9)	Won	
Wish Music Awards	2023	Wish Hip-hop Performance of the Year	"Praning"	Won	
Wish Music Awards	2024	Wish Artist of the Year	Flow G	Won	
Wish Music Awards	2024	Spotify Artist of the Year	Flow G	Won	
Wish Music Awards	2025	Wish Hip-hop Song of the Year	"Burgis" (with Hev Abi)	Nominated	
Wish Music Awards	2026	Wish Hip-hop Song of the Year	"Una Lagi"	Nominated	
Wish Music Awards	2026	Wish Artist of the Year	Flow G	Nominated	

== See also ==
- Filipino hip hop
- Ex Battalion
