= Ikaw Lang (song) =

2020 single by Nobita

Single by Nobita
- Language: Filipino
- Released: May 20, 2020
- Genre: OPM, indie rock, pop rock
- Length: 4:23
- Label: IndieTV
- Songwriter: Jaeson Felismino
- Producer: Nobita

Nobita singles chronology
"Vie (Sabihin Mo Kung)" (2019)	"Ikaw Lang" (2020)	"The Search Is Over" (2021)

Music video
- "Ikaw Lang" on YouTube

"Ikaw Lang" (transl. Only You) is a song recorded by Filipino band Nobita. It was initially uploaded on May 20, 2020, to YouTube and officially released to music platforms by IndieTV on June 12, 2020, as their third single overall. The song was written by vocalist Jaeson Felismino and collaboratively produced by the band members.

A sleeper hit, the song achieved new heights after its use in TikTok, Nobita's inclusion to Sony Music Philippines in early 2021, and the premiere of its LGBT-themed music video directed by John Selirio on October 9, 2021. Following its inclusion in major local playlists, it became the most streamed song on Spotify Philippines in 2022, two years after its release. It is the longest charting song on the Billboard Philippines Songs chart, staying for sixty-four weeks after peaking at number three.

"Ikaw Lang" is considered as the band's signature hit, being performed multiple times in live performances and covered by different artists.

== Background ==
Nobita met Joel Ellorin and joined his roster under the independent label IndieTV PH after qualifying for the semi-finals of Red Horse Beer Pambansang Muziklaban on November 23, 2019, in Cabanatuan, Nueva Ecija. Amidst their break, Jaeson Felismino sought inspiration from soundtracks of K-dramas and conceptualized "Ikaw Lang". Their second single, "Vie (Sabihin Mo Kung)", entered at number twenty on the Pinoy Myx Countdown chart dated December 21, 2019, achieving moderate success. While filming the music video together for "Vie", Felismino previewed the song to the rest of the band, with each member contributing to finalizing its sound. The track was published on Nobita's YouTube channel on May 20, 2021.

== Composition ==
"Ikaw Lang" is described as an indie-rock, modern kundiman ballad with lyrics considered as definitive of the "hugot" sound. The song is in the key of B major, playing at 121 bpm with a running time of four minute and 24 seconds.

Lyrically, the song is an ode to a "tender, sincere, certain" love. The first section of chorus ends with the line "Ikaw lang ang iniibig", similarly worded to the last line of the chorus' second section, "Ikaw lang ang iibigin".

== Commercial performance ==
"Ikaw Lang" debuted at number 163 on the Spotify Top Songs - Philippines weekly chart dated June 3, 2021, more than a year after its original release. On its third week, the single entered the top 50 for the first time, reaching its peak of number two on the chart dated March 31, 2022. Charting in the top ten of Spotify Philippines within half of the calendar year, "Ikaw Lang" was declared as the most-played Philippine track in 2022 on Spotify Wrapped, acquiring 123,395,271 plays by the end of the year.

On February 15, Billboard launched the Philippines Songs chart as part of its Hits of the World collection, in which "Ikaw Lang" debuted at number five on the chart dated February 19. On the week dated April 9, "Ikaw Lang" peaked at number three behind "Pano" and "Habang Buhay", both by Zack Tabudlo. "Ikaw Lang" has charted for 64 weeks as of May 6, 2023, setting the record as the first song ever to chart at least a year and becoming the longest charting song in Philippines Songs.

In reaction to their commercial success, the band stated on a press release how honored they are to be recognized alongside other Filipino artists: "Undeniably, our fans had been a huge part of this but we’re also grateful for Spotify’s untiring support to our music and its clear vision for their artists. Like most artists, we’re also eager to see our band’s Wrapped and see what we have done throughout 2022 as musicians."

== Videos ==
=== Lyric video ===
An accompanying lyric video for the song was uploaded onto Nobita's YouTube channel on May 20, 2021. As of April 2023, the lyric video has amassed 83 million views, becoming the band's most viewed video on the platform.

=== Music video ===
The music video for "Ikaw Lang" was directed by John Selirio and premiered on October 9, 2021. Starring Jeila Dizon and Lucky Luna in the lead, the video depicted the couple in various romantic sets, revealing a plot twist in the end that they were actually friends only, each with a different love interest of the same sex. The music video has reached 25 million views as of April 16, 2023.

== Live performances ==
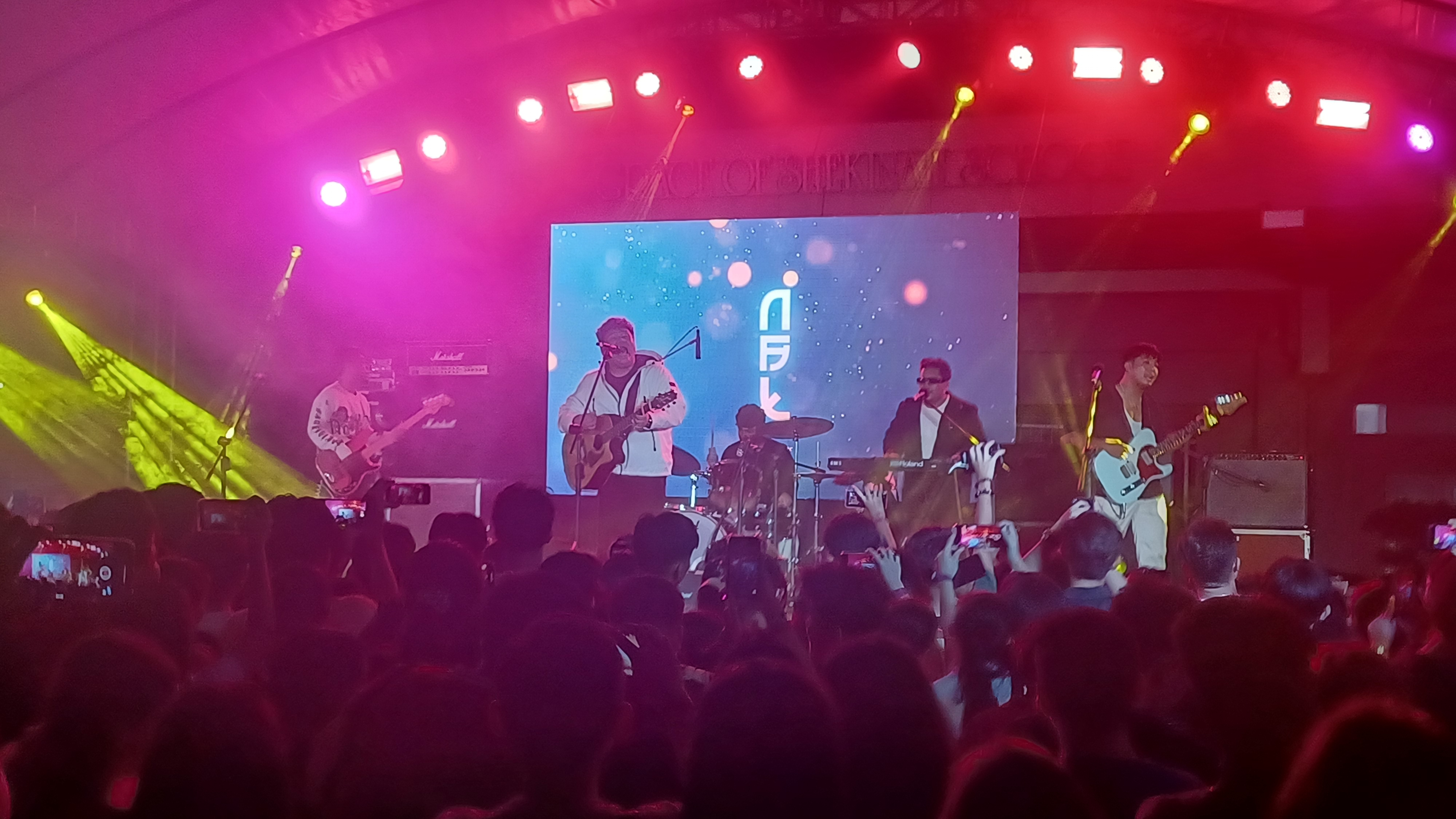
Nobita performing "Ikaw Lang" in 2023

To promote "Ikaw Lang", Nobita played the track on Rappler, Unang Hirit, and All-Out Sundays with Julie Anne San Jose. The song became the band's ending track for their setlists for major festivals, including Okada's Malaya Music Festival on June 18, 2022, Circus Music Festival on January 7, 2023, and KanLahi Music Festival on March 10, 2023.

== Cover versions ==
Following the song's popularity in TikTok, "Ikaw Lang" was covered by several Filipino artists, including Carlo Aquino, Yeng Constantino, and Wilbert Ross.

Marko Rudio covered the song for the sixth season of Tawag ng Tanghalan on May 31, 2022, qualifying as a quarterfinalist after receiving a score of 94.3% for his performance. His performance video on YouTube has 9 million views as of April 16, 2023. Drei Sugay used the track for his solo round in the second season of Idol Philippines on August 13, advancing to the next stage of the competition. Kyle Ralvin sang the song on the December 7 episode of the same season, beating defending champion Jesselli Balasabas with a score of 92.7%. Marc Antillon performed "Ikaw Lang" for the March 26, 2023 episode of the fifth season of The Voice Kids Philippines, joining the team of KZ Tandingan after turning all chairs of fellow judges Martin Nievera and Bamboo Mañalac.

== Credits and personnel ==
Credits are adapted from IndieTV.

- Jaeson Felismino – vocals, rhythm guitar
- Sam Aquino – lead guitar
- Mark Quintero – bass
- Richmond Bancolita – keyboards
- Lester Moñegas – drums

== Charts ==
Weekly chart performance for "Ikaw Lang"
Chart (2022)	Peak position
Philippines (Billboard)	3

== Release history ==
Region	Date	Format	Label(s)
Worldwide	May 20, 2020	Digital download	IndieTV
Worldwide	June 12, 2020	Streaming	IndieTV
