= Episode (disambiguation) =

An episode is a part of a dramatic work, such as a serial radio, podcast, or television program.

Episode may also refer to:

- Episode (film), a 1935 Austrian film by Walter Reisch
- Episode (Gen Hoshino album), a 2011 album by Gen Hoshino
- Episode (music), a term for a section in music
- Episode (Stratovarius album), a 1996 album by Stratovarius
- Episode (video game), an interactive storytelling game
- Episode (Zack Tabudlo album), a 2021 album by Zack Tabudlo
- Episode, a fictional character from the Monogatari series of novels and anime

== See also ==
- Episodes (disambiguation)
