= Nobita (band) =

Filipino rock band

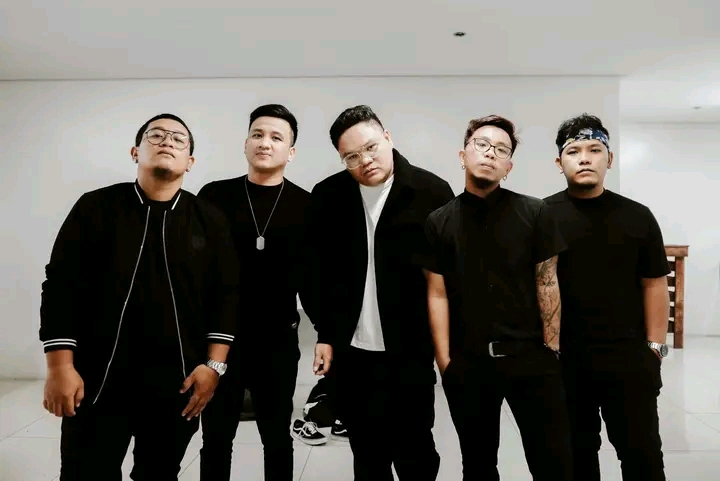
- Nobita in 2022

Background information
- Origin: Valenzuela, Philippines
- Genres: Indie pop; Alternative rock; pop rock
- Years active: 2018–present
- Label: Sony Music Philippines
- Members: Jaeson Felismino; Sam Aquino; Mark Quintero; Richmond Bancolita; Jonathan Agbanlog
- Past members: Lester Moñegas

Nobita is a Filipino rock band formed in Valenzuela in 2018. The group consists of Jaeson Felismino (vocals, acoustic guitar), Sam Aquino (lead guitar), Mark Quintero (bass), Richmond Bancolita (keyboards), and Jonathan Agbanlog (drums).

The band is mostly known for their single "Ikaw Lang", breaking records as the most streamed Filipino song on Spotify Philippines in 2022 and as the longest charting song on Billboard Philippines Songs with sixty-three weeks. Their follow-up track "Unang Sayaw" was nominated for Record of the Year at the 35th Awit Awards.

Nobita is attributed as a representative band of the "hugot" or an character from Japanese anime Doraemon sound in contemporary Filipino music, fueled by TikTok trends and relatable lyricism. The departure of drummer Lester Moñegas from the band in 2022 was met with criticism over allegations and discussions on the Philippine presidential election.

== History ==
=== 2018-2019: Formation and debut ===
In early 2018, after citing creative differences and wanting to create original songs, Mark Quintero, Sam Aquino, and Jonathan Agbanlog left "Kultura", an ethnic band originally from Pangasinan founded in 2013. Needing a vocalist, Quintero suggested contacting Jaeson Felismino, the younger brother of his former bandmate Melden Felismino, after recalling his performance at a fundraising event for cancer patients. The quartet formed Nobita in May 2018 and named it after the Katakana word meaning "to grow up strong and clear". After performing multiple gigs in bars around Metro Manila, Agbanlog left the band in early 2019 for personal reasons, being replaced by Lester Moñegas.

Nobita released their debut single "Yakap" on May 16, 2019, written by Aquino about yearning and long-distance relationships. The following month, Richmond Bancolita was added as the band's keyboardist on July 23. Written by Felismino after eavesdropping a stranger while traveling to Cavite, "Vie (Sabihin Mo Kung)" was released as their second single on October 18. The band was able to qualify for Red Horse Beer Pambansang Muziklaban by Rakista Radio, only reaching the semi-finals while competing for the Aklas trophy on November 23 in Cabanatuan, Nueva Ecija. Through the event, the band met Joel Ellorin and joined his roster under the independent label IndieTV PH. Nobita released their first music video for "Vie" directed by Kevin Hermosada on December 7, shot on a singular day. "Vie" entered at number twenty on the Pinoy Myx Countdown chart dated December 21, 2019. To promote, the band performed both "Yakap" and "Vie" on Wish 107.5, iWant ASAP, and GMA Playlist.

=== 2020-2021: Breakthrough with Ikaw Lang ===
On May 20, 2020, Nobita released "Ikaw Lang" as their third single overall to streaming platforms. A sleeper hit, the song achieved new heights after its use in TikTok, Nobita's induction to Sony Music Philippines in early 2021, and the premiere of its LGBT-themed music video directed by John Selirio on October 9, 2021. Following its inclusion in major local playlists, "Ikaw Lang" became the most streamed song on Spotify Philippines in 2022, two years after its release. Its lyric video has amassed 83 million views on YouTube as of April 2023, becoming Nobita's most viewed video on the site. Regarding the achievement, the band stated on a press release how honored they are to be recognized alongside other Filipino artists: "Undeniably, our fans had been a huge part of this but we’re also grateful for Spotify’s untiring support to our music and its clear vision for their artists. Like most artists, we’re also eager to see our band’s Wrapped and see what we have done throughout 2022 as musicians."

The group published their first English track and their first song under Sony on May 26, 2021, with "The Search Is Over", a cinematic coming-of-age track with acoustic arrangements. On August 18, Nobita released the audio and music video to "Unang Sayaw" featuring internet personality Dante Gulapa directed by Jeff Valencia, gaining 21 million views on YouTube as of April 2023. On October 20, the band followed up with the single "Di Na Mag-Iisa", inspired by wedding vows witnessed by Felismino through the years. The vocalist added how the song is about "the kind of affection that you’ve never known, a connection that is stronger than anything else in this world, a sense of serenity and happiness that is beyond your imagination.” A music video for the song directed by Valencia featuring the wedding of YouTube personalities Christian "Boss Keng" Gaspar and Pat Velasquez was uploaded on November 28. A Christmas-themed original song titled "Tayong Dalawa sa Pasko" was released on November 30.

=== 2022: Billboard and Moñegas' departure ===
On February 15, 2022, Billboard launched the Philippines Songs chart as part of its Hits of the World collection, in which "Ikaw Lang" debuted at number five on the chart dated February 19. On the week dated April 9, "Unang Sayaw" made its debut at number twenty-three and "Ikaw Lang" peaked at number three behind "Pano" and "Habang Buhay", both by Zack Tabudlo. "Unang Sayaw" reached its highest position at number thirteen on the chart dated April 23, staying in the chart for twelve weeks in total. "Ikaw Lang" has charted for 61 weeks as of April 15, 2023, setting the record as the first song ever to chart at least a year and becoming the longest charting song in Philippines Songs.

The farewell ode "Totoo" written by Aquino was released on April 7, including a music video directed by Selirio and starring actor Mon Confiado. Articulating the uncertainty of an unrequited love, Aquino defined its songwriting as a "counter song" for their usual romantic anthems and coming from "a place of earnestness of being at the bitter end of a relationship." "Paano Uusad" was made available on July 22, a mid-tempo track with alt-rock influences evoking themes of loss, pain, and confusion over layered and intricate vocal arrangements. A music video was released on the same day directed by Selirio to promote the track.

On July 27, alleged screenshots of the members’ group chat in the Messenger app were posted on the Facebook page “Mga taong may underrated music taste personality disorder”, leading to speculations that Moñegas was removed from the band due to his political support for 2022 Philippine presidential candidate Leni Robredo. The post was deleted by request hours later; however, the page continued to publish criticism against the band and made Nobita a trending topic on Facebook and Twitter. The following day, Moñegas published his commentary on his personal Facebook account confirming his removal and ownership of the screenshots, claiming the messages were leaked without the band's consent possibly by his partner at the time and clarifying his termination was caused by his inability to maintain neutrality in the band's political affiliation. In response, Nobita issued an official statement minutes after Moñegas' post, denying the accusations of cyberbullying, assuring their continuous collaboration with Moñegas post-removal, claiming the band's non-partisan stance on socio-political beliefs, and seeking legal advice from authorities against the personnel involved in the defamation.

Amidst the controversy, Agbanlog returned as the group's drummer and "Sa Ulan" was released on October 7. Described as a stripped-down folk-pop track that evokes the warmth of home and romance, Felismino noted how the track was inspired by "a pivotal moment in his life" and how the song was his way of expressing gratitude after feeling unworthy of love. The recording for "Sa Ulan" took five days and featured a slight departure sonically from the band's previous releases. On December 23, Nobita released their version of "Magasin" from the Eraserheads album CiRcuS as a tribute to the band and as part of the spatial audio re-release of the Eraserheads discography to streaming sites. Regarding their jazz-pop approach on the song, the band spoke highly of Eraserheads: "Nobita heavily draws inspiration from their music, especially their brand of songwriting. Their work has shaped us into where we are now, and we’re forever grateful to their enormous contribution to OPM artists, young and old."

=== 2023: Kalangitan ===
Co-written by Felismino, Quintero, and Bancolita and co-produced by Palabyab, "Kalangitan" was made available on March 3. An inspirational pop-rock ballad about companionship, a music video for the song directed by Selirio featuring Joao Constancia and Queenay Mercado was released on the same day, serving as a commentary on the high school clique system and bullying. Regarding the track's message, the band pointed how "when you think that you have reached rock bottom, remember that there is always someone with you who will help you reach for the heavens."

== Artistry and influences ==
Nobita defined their sound as indie in general, drawing from different genres of rock, R&B, and pop to form their sound and making love songs as an essential theme. Felismino cited Rico Blanco as his primary influence in terms of songwriting and melody, as well as Damien Rice among international artists. Other inspirations of the band include Phil Collins, Steve Gadd, John Bonham, Buddy Zabala, Vic Mercado, Fayeed Tan, Nikko Rivera, and Roger Alcantara.

== Accolades ==
At the 35th Awit Awards, held by the Philippine Association of the Record Industry in partnership with MYX, Nobita was nominated for three People's Voice categories, namely: Breakthrough Artist, Favorite Group Artist, and Favorite Song for "Unang Sayaw". "Unang Sayaw" was nominated for the main category of Record of the Year, losing to "Anticipation" by Leanne & Naara.

== Band members ==
=== Current members ===
- Jaeson "Jae" Felismino – vocals, acoustic/rhythm guitar (2018–present)
- Samuel "Sam" Aquino II – lead guitar, backing vocals (2018–present)
- Mark Anthony Quintero – bass, backing vocals (2018–present)
- Richmond Christian Bancolita – keyboards, backing vocals (2019–present)
- Jonathan "Nath" Lim Agbanlog, Jr. – drums (2018-2019; 2022–present)

=== Former members ===
- Roman Lester Moñegas – drums (2019–2022)

== Discography ==
=== Singles ===
List of singles, with selected chart positions, and showing year released as single
Title	Year	Peak chart positions
Title	Year	PHL Songs
"Yakap"	2019	—
"Vie (Sabihin Mo Kung)"	2019	—
"Ikaw Lang"	2020	3
"The Search Is Over"	2021	—
"Unang Sayaw"	2021	13
"Di Na Mag-Iisa"	2021	—
"Tayong Dalawa sa Pasko"	2021	—
"Totoo"	2022	—
"Paano Uusad"	2022	—
"Sa Ulan"	2022	—
"Magasin"	2022	—
"Kalangitan"	2023	—
"Hay Buhay"	—	
"Tayo Na Lang"	2024	—
"Gitna"	—	
"PNYT" feat. Flow G	2025	—
