= Pano (song) =

2021 single by Zack Tabudlo

Single by Zack Tabudlo

from the album 3rd Time's a Charm
- Language: Filipino
- Released: December 6, 2021
- Genre: Pop; alt-pop; R&B
- Length: 4:14
- Label: Island Philippines; UMG Philippines
- Songwriter: Zack Tabudlo
- Producer: Zack Tabudlo

Zack Tabudlo singles chronology
"Ba't Ganito ang Pag-ibig" (2021)	"Pano" (2021)	"Hatdog" (2022)

Music video
- "Pano" on YouTube

"Pano" (lit. 'How') is a song by Filipino singer Zack Tabudlo from his third studio album, 3rd Time's a Charm (2023). It was released to music and streaming platforms on December 6, 2021, via Island Records Philippines and UMG Philippines. Self-written and produced by Tabudlo, the lyrics allude to self-pity and questioning one's unrequited love.

"Pano" is described as a R&B with minimal instruments, a slight departure from Tabudlo's sound in his debut album, Episode (2021). The song was a commercial success, becoming the longest-running number-one OPM song on Spotify Philippines. It also became the first number-one song to debut on Billboard's Philippines Songs chart, staying at its peak for eleven weeks. Internationally, the track charted in other Southeast Asian countries, including Malaysia, Thailand, and Vietnam, as well as other nations globally through Spotify Viral 50.

An accompanying lyric video for the song was uploaded to YouTube simultaneously with the single's release, becoming Tabudlo's most viewed video on the platform. After gaining prominence on TikTok, a music video was released on October 3, 2022, as the first part of a trilogy. Tabudlo performed "Pano" during several live performances, including Expo 2020 Dubai, We the Fest Jakarta, and Head in the Clouds Manila. It has been covered by several local and international artists and was used as the theme song for What We Could Be (2022).

== Background ==
Inspired by different styles of alt-pop, R&B, and blues, Zack Tabudlo marked the release of his debut full-length studio and visual album, Episode, on October 15, 2021. The album and its tracks topped different charts on Spotify and was certified 2× Platinum by the Philippine Association of the Record Industry, led by the success of the singles "Habang Buhay" and "Binibini". During this time, Tabudlo mentioned how his songwriting phase involved experimenting on new sounds and ideas: "[I wanted to] think of ideas on how to evolve in my own state and how to evolve as an artist." He revealed that "Pano" was written while he underwent a breakup, weeks after the album's release.

In early December, Tabudlo announced through his social media about his new single "Pano" to be released on his birthday (December 6) as a gift to his fans, ultimately ending the promotion cycle of Episode. Regarding its surprise release, Tabudlo remarked: "Here’s a track called 'Pano'. Ready [your] hearts [cause I'm about] to destroy [them] and make them cry." He envisioned "Pano" to be a song about "showing your vulnerability and genuine love." During an online interview with Myx to promote the song, Tabudlo revealed how he convinced his management to release the song as a bonus track: "I wanted to release again. A last one as a filler track. And then it did really good... In just 3 days, it went top of the charts at Top 100."

== Composition ==
"Pano" is described as an R&B-pop ballad with minimal production and guitar elements. Tabudlo clarified how the track differed from his previous music sonically, wanting a laid-back approach in its production while still providing soulful elements that complement his singing style. The song is in the key of E ♭ major, playing at 175 bpm with a running time of four minutes and 14 seconds.

Lyrically, Tabudlo defined how the track is about self-pity, heartbreak, and unrequited love, despite one's efforts. He added how he wrote the song for listeners to cry to “but in a good way". Regarding his process of writing "Pano", Tabudlo stated: "That's what I love most about writing and being a producer myself, having the control of releasing my music. Every time I write a song, it's me releasing my inner thoughts. Every time that I go through something really bad or something really happy, I want to release it. I write it down, make the music in just an hour, release it in a week. After I release it, it's more of just me letting go of that weight in me, and it helps so much mentally and emotionally as well."

In the verses of "Pano", Tabudlo compares himself to the Filipino derogatory terms "uto-uto", "marupok", and "alipin" to depreciate his own worth. For the pre-chorus, the lines "May nararamdaman din ako / Di kasi manhid na tulad mo" onwards is loudly sung higher than the first verse as a declaration of anguish and pain for an unrequited love. The song's main hook, "Pano naman ako?", is a rhetorical question pondering on one's fate.

== Commercial performance ==
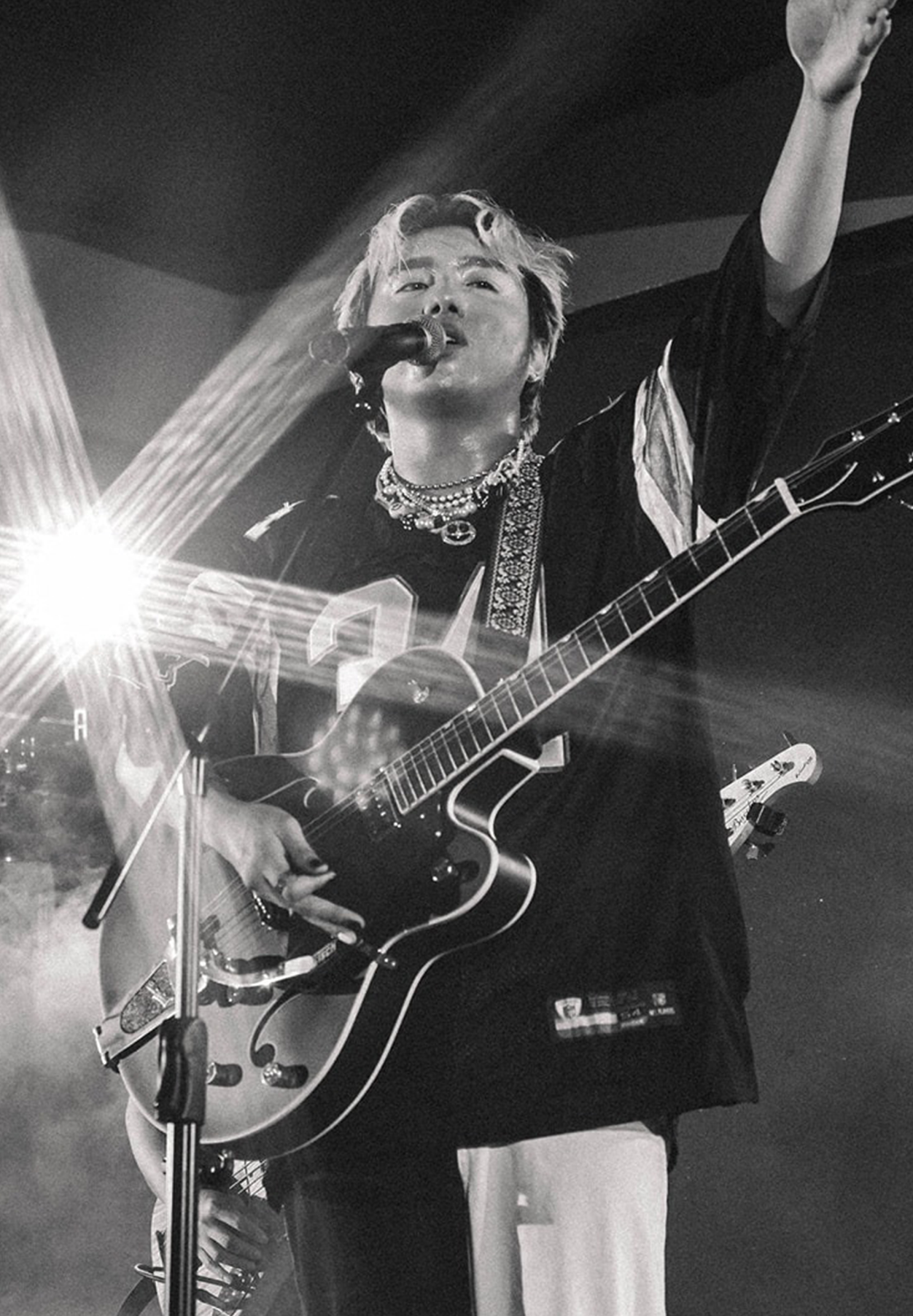
Zack Tabudlo broke several local records with "Pano", most notably as the longest-charting number-one OPM song on Spotify Philippines (122 days), and as the first song to reach number one in Billboard's Philippines Songs.

"Pano" debuted at number 3 on the Spotify Top Songs - Philippines weekly and reached number one in its second week, retaining its spot for 18 consecutive weeks. "Pano" also remained atop the Spotify Top 50 - Philippines chart for 62 days, breaking the record for the longest running number-one OPM song on the history of Spotify Philippines, previously held by IV of Spades' "Mundo". The single extended its record to 122 days, with a total of 129 million streams as of February 17, 2023. On Spotify Wrapped, "Pano" placed as the fourth most-played Philippine track in 2022. On YouTube, it is the most listened-to song in the Philippines in 2022 with over 97 million streams according to a research conducted by Liberty Games.

On February 15, Billboard launched the Philippines Songs chart as part of its Hits of the World collection, in which "Pano" debuted at number one on the chart dated February 19. The track set several records, becoming the first song in the history of the chart to peak at number one, the first song to debut on top, and the first chart-topper performed and written by a Filipino musician. On the weeks dated April 16 and April 23, Tabudlo monopolized the top 3 of the chart with "Pano" at number one, followed by his other singles "Habang Buhay" and "Asan Ka Na Ba". The song stayed at number one for 11 weeks, becoming the longest-running number-one song in Philippines Songs. "Pano" charted for 30 weeks in total, making its last appearance on the week ending on December 17, 2022.

Nearly a year after its release, the song gained popularity in other Southeast Asian countries through its use in TikTok, drawing 100 million views on the platform. In Vietnam, "Pano" entered the Top 15 of Spotify Top 50 daily chart and the Top 50 of Billboard Vietnam Hot 100, a rarity for foreign songs in the country. The song peaked at number 14 on the Vietnam Hot 100 chart dated December 22, 2022 in its fourth week of charting. In Malaysia, the track debuted and peaked at number 19 in the Malaysia Songs chart ending on November 26. It is also the first Filipino song to enter the Spotify Top 50 - Malaysia chart, peaking at number 33. In Thailand, "Pano" ranked at number one on the international music charts of Line Melody for February 2023. "Pano" charted on the Global chart of Spotify Viral 50, including multiple component charts in Canada, Hong Kong, India, Indonesia, Malaysia, New Zealand, Pakistan, Philippines, Saudi Arabia, Singapore, Thailand, United Arab Emirates, and Vietnam.

In retrospect, Tabudlo looked back on the song's commercial run and international revival in a 2023 Malaysian interview with TrendGrnd at Selangor: "It's crazy after two years of peaking in the Philippine charts because in history, it's the longest number one in the Philippines. And so, we kind of got over it when it kind of went down the charts, moved on to another era, moved on to other songs. We had no idea how Southeast Asian countries picked it up and championed it into their countries as well. It's amazing." Tabudlo added how the song's existence felt "nostalgic", citing the two years difference between its original release in 2021 and its peak internationally. He remarked: "It's a dream to, in a way, conquer Southeast Asia. Of course, I'm gonna go a long way, but just seeing that little light when it comes to my songs and how possible it is for different countries, especially Malaysia and Indonesia... How strong '[Pano]' is in their countries? I see a lot of potential with making more songs and having them to hear it as well, championing maybe in the future."

== Videos ==
=== Lyric Video ===
An accompanying lyric video for the song was uploaded onto Tabudlo's YouTube channel on December 6, 2021. As of March 2023, the lyric video has amassed 101 million views, becoming the singer's most viewed video on the platform and the most viewed song in the Philippines in 2022.

With its rising recognition overseas, Tabudlo released four lyric videos of "Pano" on November 28, 2022, in different languages (Bahasa Indonesia, Vietnamese, Bahasa Malaysia, and Thai). The promotion was met with critical acclaim from the countries for its local accessibility, boosting both the Vietnamese and Thai versions of "Pano" to over 5 million views as of March 8, 2023.

=== Music video ===
The music video for "Pano" was directed by Dominic Bakaert and premiered through Vevo on October 3, 2022. Advertised as the first part of a trilogy, it stars Kira Balinger as a frustrated painter coming from a breakup, along with Tabudlo as her friend who helps her move on despite his unrequited feelings for her. After Balinger suffers an alcohol-influenced breakdown, Tabudlo comforts her. The music video has reached 1 million views as of March 8, 2023.

== Live performances ==
Tabudlo made his debut performance of "Pano" during the Jubilee Stage of Expo 2020 in Dubai on February 20, 2022. He performed the song as a duet with singer Denize Castillo in his online concert titled "Sabihin Mo Na", airing the performance through YouTube and Facebook on March 5. Tabudlo performed "Pano" on several shows in different Ayala Malls throughout March before embarking on a North American joint tour with December Avenue. He performed the song across eight venues in the United States from April 30 to May 28.

Tabudlo performed "Pano" on major festivals including Okada's Malaya Music Fest on June 18, Coke Studio's Tugatog Filipino Music Festival on July 15, We the Fest Indonesia 2022 on September 24, Music Is Universal Singapore on September 27, UMUSIC Fanverse Manila on October 23, and Cebu Aurora Fest 2022 on November 19. The song's live recording at the Wish 107.5 Bus was uploaded to YouTube on November 25. The track was also included in the setlist for Head in the Clouds Manila on December 9 held at Parañaque City.

In 2023, "Pano" was also part of Tabudlo's setlist for Circus Music Festival on January 7, BGC Love Street on February 18, Sunway University on March 3, and Music Is Universal Malaysia on March 4. Tabudlo was surprised by the immense popularity of "Pano" among the Malaysian crowd in an interview on March 4: "Apparently, it is. We had no idea. We kind of tested out the waters yesterday in Sunway University. I remember me and my band, we kind of talked before going to the university. We were like, "This is where we kind of test out 'Pano' and how strong it is when it comes to the audience and performing it." It's crazy because they sang all of the Tagalog words from like the beginning till the end which is just really heartwarming. It was really nice to hear that."

== Cover versions and media usage ==
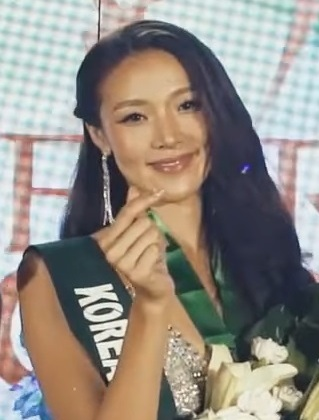
South Korean beauty queen Mina Sue Choi posted her cover of "Pano" online through the Miss Earth TikTok page. The song helped introduce Filipino music to a worldwide audience for its appeal.

Following the song's debut, "Pano" was covered by several Filipino artists, including Zephanie, Kristel Fulgar, and Stell of SB19. After its popularity in TikTok, several international artists posted their covers of the track, helping to reinforce modern Filipino music to a worldwide audience. British Valorant gamer and Twitch streamer Boaster of Fnatic first sang a snippet of the song in October 2022 before releasing his full cover to his Twitter account on December 10. Miss Earth 2022 titleholder Mina Sue Choi of South Korea posted her version at the official TikTok page of Miss Earth on December 12. Thai-British actress Rebecca Patricia Armstrong from Gap initially covered the song on late December, performing it on her subsequent fan-meets and events. Miss Grand Thailand 2022 third runner-up Nesa Mahmoodi first sang the song on a TikTok Live on late December. Thai-Belgian singer Violette Wautier released an acoustic cover of the chorus of "Pano" to her TikTok page on January 31, 2023, reaching 2 million views as of March 2023.

On June 24, 2022, GMA Network announced "Pano" as the official theme song for the television drama What We Could Be (2022), starring Miguel Tanfelix and Ysabel Ortega. Quantum Films uploaded a two-minute and 38 second-music video of "Pano" to promote the series featuring scenes of Tanfelix and Ortega on July 15, becoming a trending topic on Twitter. The program aired from August 29 until its last episode on October 27, 2022.

== Credits and personnel ==
Credits are adapted from UMG Philippines.

- Zack Tabudlo – lead vocals, backing vocals, producer, mixing engineer, mastering

== Charts ==
Weekly chart performance for "Pano"
Chart (2022)	Peak position
Malaysia (Billboard)	19
Philippines (Billboard)	1
Vietnam (Vietnam Hot 100)	14

== Certifications ==
Region	Certification	Certified units/sales
Canada (Music Canada)	Gold	40,000^{‡}
^{‡} Sales+streaming figures based on certification alone.

== Release history ==
Region	Date	Format	Label(s)
Worldwide	December 6, 2021	Digital download	Island; UMG
