= 34th Awit Awards =

2021 Philippine music awards ceremony

- Date: November 29, 2021

Highlights
- Most nominations: Leanne & Naara and Ben&Ben (7)
- Website: awitawards.com.ph

The 34th Awit Awards were held on November 29, 2021. Indie pop duo Leanne & Naara and folk pop band Ben&Ben led the nominations with seven, and won the awards for Album of the Year and Record of the Year, respectively. The Song of the Year category was awarded to Moira Dela Torre and Jason Marvin's work of "Paubaya".

The ceremony had the theme "Proudly Homegrown", referring to pride and gratitude of the expression, inspiration, growth and strength shown by Original Filipino Music amid the COVID-19 pandemic. The ceremony also awarded thirty-three categories, including two debutants, Best New Artist in a Collaboration and Best Global Recording.

== Performers ==
- SB19
- Lil Joar
- Fana
- James Gulles
- Rhythm & Drip
- Alex Bruce
- Unique Salonga
- Extrapolation
- Zack Tabudlo
- Noel Cabangon
- Leanne & Naara
- Alamat
- Lil Vinceyy
- Sassa Dagdag
- Eunice Jorge of Gracenote
- Anthony Rosaldo
- Jeremiah Tiangco
- Bryan Chong
- Jamm Rea
- Zsaris
- Selena Marie
- BGYO
- Janine Teñoso
- Regine Velasquez-Alcasid
- Ben&Ben

== Winners and nominees ==
The nominations for the fan-voted categories, deemed as Peoples' Voice, were announced on October 28, 2021. While, the rest of the nominations were announced on November 6, 2021. Winners are listed first and highlighted in bold.

=== General field ===
Record of the Year

- **"Di Ka Sayang" – Ben&Ben**
  - **Poch Barretto, Toni Muñoz, Keifer Cabugao, Pat Lasaten, Paolo Benjamin and Jean Paul Verona, producers; Jean Paul Verona, recording engineer**
- "Dila" – Zild
  - Zild Benitez, producer; Zild Benitez, recording engineer
- "Marupok" – KZ Tandingan
  - Roxy A. Liquigan and Jonathan Manalo, producers; Tim Recla, recording engineer
- "Nangangamba" – Zack Tabudlo
  - Zack Tabudlo, producer; Zack Tabudlo, recording engineer
- "When U Will Be There" – Joar Sabate
  - Joar Sabate, producer; Joar Sabate, singer-songwriter
- "Paubaya" – Moira Dela Torre
  - Roxy A. Liquigan, Jonathan Manalo, James Narvaez, Chris Ian Rosales and Luke Sigua, producers; Tim Recla and James Narvaez, recording engineers
- "This Too Shall Pass" – Rico Blanco
  - Rico Blanco, producer; Rico Blanco, recording engineer
- "Who's Gonna Love You" – Leanne & Naara
  - Brian Lotho and Kelley Mangahas, producers; Brian Lotho, recording engineer

Album of the Year

- **Daybreak – Leanne & Naara**
  - **Warner Music Philippines, executive producer; Brian Lotho, line producer**
- Diwa – Juan Karlos
  - UMG Philippines and Juan Karlos Labajo, executive producers; Juan Karlos Labajo, Gian Franco, Rey Hipolito and Abe Hipolito, line producers
- Homework Machine – Zild
  - Zild Benitez, executive producer; Zild Benitez, line producer
- Pangalan – Unique Salonga
  - OC Records, executive producer; OC Records, line producer
- Waiting for the End to Start – The Itchyworms
  - Sony Music Entertainment Philippines, executive producer; Jazz Nicolas and The Itchyworms, line producers

Song of the Year

- **"Paubaya"**
  - **Moira Dela Torre & Jason Marvin, songwriters (Moira Dela Torre)**
- "Di Ka Sayang"
  - Paolo Benjamin & Miguel Benjamin, songwriters (Ben&Ben)
- "Dila"
  - Daniel Zildjian Benitez, songwriter (Zild)
- "Lifetime"
  - Paolo Benjamin & Miguel Benjamin, songwriters (Ben&Ben)
- "Marupok"
  - Danielle Balagtas, songwriter (KZ Tandingan)
- "Who's Gonna Love You"
  - Rose Caroline Mamonong & Naara Acueza, songwriters (Leanne & Naara)

=== Performance field ===
Best Performance by a Female Recording Artist

- **"Right Next to You" – Keiko Necesario**
  - "Mahal Ko O Mahal Ako" – Regine Velasquez-Alcasid
  - "Paubaya" – Moira Dela Torre
  - "Agsardeng" – Miss Ramone
  - "Lunod" – Shaina Opsimar

Best Performance by a Male Recording Artist

- **"Kulang ang Mundo" – Sam Mangubat**
  - "Puhon" – TJ Monterde
  - "Nangangamba" – Zack Tabudlo
  - "Pipiliin Pang Maghintay" – Noel Cabangon
  - "Tuloy Tuloy" – Quest

Best Collaboration Performance

- **"Bestiny" – Jr Crown and Kevin Yadao**
  - "Kahit Kunwari Man Lang" – Moira Dela Torre and Agsunta
  - "Simula" – TJ Monterde and KZ Tandingan
  - "Sampaguita" – Juan Karlos and Gloc-9
  - "Bukas Walang Nang Ulan" – Christian Bautista and Janine Teñoso

Best Performance by a Group Recording Artist

- **"Sariling Multo (Sa Panaginip)" – IV of Spades**
  - "Doors" – Ben&Ben
  - "Di Ka Sayang" – Ben&Ben
  - "Hanggang Sa Huli" – SB19
  - "Dumaloy" – Sud

Best Performance by a New Female Recording Artist

- **"Out" – Fana**
  - "Liliwanag" – Trisha Denis
  - "1996" – Daze
  - "Somebody" – TJane Plaza
  - "Sana'y Tayo Pa" – TJane Plaza
  - "A.A" – Jenn Clemena

Best Performance by a New Male Recording Artist

- **"Sayaw ng Mga Tala" – Matty Juniosa**
  - "Di Na Bale" – Bryant Dagdag
  - "Di Namalayan" – Benedict Cua
  - "Ulap" – Rob Deniel
  - "Hinungdan" – James Gulles

Best Performance by a New Group Recording Artist

- **"Outlaws" – Nameless Kids**
  - "Pahina" – Kiss N Tell
  - "Pero" – Rhythm & Drip
  - "Love Kita Maniwala Ka" – JThree
  - "Suyo" – Reon

Best Child Recording Artist

- **"The Kokak Song" – Bea C**

Best Instrumental Performance

- **"Cosmic Cycles" – Four Corners MNL**
  - "Midnight Cruise" – Tristan Castro
  - "Dreaming of Tomorrow" – Abby Clutario
  - "Lovestruck" – Ken Tiongson
  - "Tama Na" – EJ De Perio

Best New Artist in a Collaboration

- **"Magandang Dilag" – JM Bales featuring KVN**
  - "GG" – J-Nine with King Promdi
  - "Random Thoughts" – Vince Lucero and Mistah Lefty

=== Recording field ===
Best Global Recording

- **"Rise" – Eric Bellinger, Iñigo Pascual, Sam Concepcion, Moophs, Zee Avi and Vince Nantes**
  - "Usahay" – Troy Laureta and Jake Zyrus
  - "Doors" – Ben&Ben
  - "Right Next to You" – Keiko Necesario
  - "Fix Me" – Travis Atreo featuring Amber Liu

Best Ballad Recording

- **"Sa Susunod Na Habang Buhay" – Ben&Ben**
  - "Paubaya" – Moira Dela Torre
  - "Simula" – TJ Monterde & KZ Tandingan
  - "Araw't Gabi" – Clara Benin
  - "Pipiliin Pang Maghintay" – Noel Cabangon

Best Pop Recording

- **"Happy Feelin'" – Rico Blanco**
  - "Gunita" – Kyryll
  - "Sumayaw (Sa Kanya-Kanyang Kwarto)" – Earl Generao
  - "Bago" – Autotelic
  - "Nangangamba" – Zack Tabudlo

Best Rock/Alternative Recording

- **"Sariling Multo (Sa Panaginip)" – IV of Spades**
  - "Himala" – Silent Sanctuary
  - "Armageddon Blues" – The Itchyworms
  - "Paalam" – The Knobs
  - "Dumaloy" – Sud

Best World Music Recording

- **"Palawan" – High Hello**
  - "Waiting for the End to Start" – The Itchyworms
  - "Never Made It Far" – Leanne & Naara
  - "Sana Naman" – JBK
  - "XX:XX" – Jason Dhakal & CRWN

Best Novelty Recording

- **"Sabi Ko Nga Ba" – Hannah Precillas**
  - "Corona Ba Bye Na!" – Vice Ganda
  - "Bawal Lumabas (The Classroom Song)" – Kim Chiu
  - "DWYB" – Mimiyuuuh
  - "Tik Tok" – King Promdi

Best Traditional/Contemporary Folk Recording

- **"Kita Na Kita" – Moira Dela Torre**
  - "Hulog Ni Bathala" – Sassa Dagdag
  - "Sa Susunod Na Habang Buhay" – Ben&Ben
  - "Bawat Araw" – Hans Dimayuga
  - "Choose You" – Leanne & Naara
  - "Evergreen" – Leanne & Naara

Best Dance Recording

- **"G Na G" – Zsara Tiblani**
  - "Bad Influence" – Yuzon, Subzylla & Kyler
  - "Hibang" – La Santos
  - "Kinabukasan" – Deuges
  - "Love at First Sight" – Alexa Ilacad

Best Inspirational Recording

- **"Di Ka Sayang" – Ben&Ben**
  - "Dakila Ka, Bayani Ka" – Polyeast Artists
  - "This Too Shall Pass" – Rico Blanco
  - "Tuloy Tuloy" – Quest

Best Christmas Recording

- **"Paskong Walang Hanggan" – Arman Ferrer**
  - "Paano Ang Simbang Gabi (Kung Di Ikaw Ang Katabi)" – Drei Raña & Selena Marie
  - "Share the Love" – Elha Nympha
  - "A Brand New Christmas" – Martin Nievera
  - "'Tis the Season" – Katrina Velarde, Daryl Ong, Dea Formilleza and Yuki Ito

Best Rap/Hip-hop Recording

- **"Umaga" – Arvey**
  - "Subtle Energy" – Juss Rye
  - "Yakap" – Alex Bruce
  - "88" – Zelijah & KNTMNL
  - "Sinayang" – Nobrvnd, Chelly

Best Jazz Recording

- **"Poblacion" – Nicole Asensio**
  - "Villain" – Extrapolation
  - "'Wag" – Issa Rodriguez
  - "Lightning Strikes" – Basically Saturday Night
  - "Choose You" – Leanne & Naara

Best R&B Recording

- **"Too Soon" – Leanne & Naara**
  - "Previously, On" – Conscious & The Goodness
  - "Elated" – August Wahh
  - "Gunita" – Kyryll
  - "Goodnight" – Jason Dhakal

Best Regional Recording

- **"Ania Ko" – Route 83**
  - "Bulalakaw" – Janine Berdin & Joanna Ang
  - "Puhon" – TJ Monterde
  - "Tumang Kamingaw" – Tjane Plaza
  - "Suyo" – Reon
  - "Holly" – JKLRD & St. Ven

Best Song Written for Movie/TV/Stage Play

- **"Hanggang Sa Huli" – Moira Dela Torre for 24/7**
  - "Maligaya Ang Buhay" – Iñigo Pascual for Four Sisters Before the Wedding
  - "Malaya Ako" – Bryant for Hush
  - "Ang Sa Iyo Ay Akin" – Aegis for Ang sa Iyo ay Akin
  - "Ngayon" – Emerzon Texon featuring Dex Yu for Gameboys

=== Technical field ===
Best Engineered Recording

- **"Marupok"**
  - **Tim Recla, sound engineer; Purple Room Recording Studios, recording studio (KZ Tandingan)**
- "Puhon"
  - Albert Tamayo, sound engineer; ProdigiMusic Studio, recording studio (TJ Monterde)
- "Sa Susunod Na Habang Buhay"
  - Jean Paul Verona, sound engineer; Verona Audio Design, recording studio (Ben&Ben)
- "Nangangamba"
  - Zack Tabudlo, sound engineer (Zack Tabudlo)
- "Dila"
  - Zild Benitez, sound engineer; Zild's Home Studio, recording studio (Zild)

Best Cover Art

- **Rico Blanco Songbook**
  - **Kurt Byron Vale Maligaya, graphic designer; Jason Paul Laxamana, concept (Rico Blanco)**
- Hibang
  - Joyce Ignacio, graphic designer; Emmie Villegas, concept (LA Santos)
- Bago
  - Ivee Pendo, graphic designer; Autotelic, concept (Autotelic)
- Purple Afternoon
  - Beatrix Zaragoza, graphic designer; Paolo Sandejas, concept (Paolo Sandejas)
- Don't Look Back
  - Kyla Baltazar, graphic designer; Lorenzo Santos and Kyla Baltazar, concept (Lola Amour)

Best Music Video

- **"Dila"**
  - **Daniel Aguilar, director; Zild Benitez, producer (Zild)**
- "No Rush"
  - Jade Regala and Chapters, directors; Roxy A. Liquigan and Tarsier Records, producers (Kiana V featuring Billy Davis)
- "Naubos Na"
  - Kyle Quismondo, director; Oh, Flamingo!, producers (Oh, Flamingo!)
- "Hanggang Sa Huli"
  - Justin de Dios, director; ShowBT, producers (SB19)
- "Poblacion"
  - Gorio Vicuna, director; Nicole Asensio, producer (Nicole Asensio)

=== Peoples' Voice ===
Peoples' Voice Favorite Male Artist

- **Anthony Rosaldo**
- Adie
- Arvey
- Because
- Joar Sabate
- Rico Blanco
- Garrett Bolden
- Ken Chan
- Benedict Cua
- JM de Guzman
- EJ de Perio
- Jason Dhakal
- Darren Espanto
- Fern
- JMKO
- Juan Karlos
- Kritiko
- Michael Dutchi Libranda
- Jireh Lim
- TJ Monterde
- Arthur Nery
- Nobrvnd
- Miguel Odron
- Dan Ombao
- Quest
- Unique Salonga
- Zack Tabudlo
- Zild

Peoples' Voice Favorite Female Artist

- **Elha Nympha**
- Barbie Almalbis
- Anjl
- Nicole Asensio
- Marion Aunor
- Clara Benin
- Yeng Constantino
- Moira Dela Torre
- Shane G
- Syd Hartha
- Jona
- Angela Ken
- KZ
- Dia Mate
- Keiko Necesario
- Angeline Quinto
- Maris Racal
- Sabrina
- Janella Salvador
- Sassa
- Janine Tenoso
- Esang de Torres
- Bianca Umali
- Zephanie
- Zsaris

Peoples' Voice Favorite Breakthrough Artist

- **Shane G**
- 8 Ballin
- Adie
- Arvey
- Ace Banzuelo
- Alex Bruce
- Rob Deniel
- JMKO
- Angela Ken
- Markus
- Mimiyuuuh
- Arthur Nery
- Nobita
- Miguel Odron
- Dan Ombao
- Raven
- Zack Tabudlo
- Lil Vinceyy
- XOXO
- Zephanie

Peoples' Voice Favorite Group Artist

- **BGYO**
- 8 Ballin
- ALMO$T
- Bandang Lapis
- Ben&Ben
- Bini
- BRWN
- Cheats
- The Company
- The Itchyworms
- JBK
- The Juans
- Kiss N Tell
- Leanne & Naara
- Lola Amour
- One Click Straight
- Over October
- Rhythm & Drip
- Sasaya
- SB19
- Shockra
- Silent Sanctuary
- Sponge Cola
- St. Wolf
- Sud
- VVS Collective
- XOXO

Peoples' Voice Favorite Song

- **"Hanggang sa Huli" – SB19**
- "Bago" – Autotelic
- "Believe in Christmas" – Darren Espanto
- "Blanko" – Janella Salvador
- "Chinta Girl" – Lil Vinceyy featuring Guel
- "Di Ka Sayang" – Ben&Ben
- "Di Namalayan" – Benedict Cua
- "Dumaloy" – Sud
- "Hanggang Dito Na Lang" – TJ Monterde
- "Higa" – Arthur Nery
- "Huwag Ka Sanang Magagalit" – Unique Salonga
- "Ikaw" – Autotelic
- "Keeping Me Up" – Leanne & Naara
- "Lambing" – Sasaya
- "Let Go" – Leanne & Naara
- "Lifetime" – Ben&Ben
- "Marupok" – KZ Tandingan
- "Nangangamba" – Zack Tabudlo
- "Ngayong Gabi" – Nino Alejandro & Nicole Asensio
- "Paalam" – Moira Dela Torre & Ben&Ben
- "Pansamantala" – Lala Vinzon
- "Patawad" – Moira Dela Torre
- "Paubaya" – Moira Dela Torre
- "Please Don't Leave" – Lola Amour
- "Puhon" – TJ Monterde
- "Ready, Let Go" – Keiko Necesario
- "Right Next to You" – Keiko Necesario
- "Sa Susunod Na Habang Buhay" – Ben&Ben
- "Sinayang" – Nobrvnd & Chelly
- "Sinungaling" – Zild
- "S.S.H." – One Click Straight
- "Stars" – Brwn
- "Suyo" – Reon
- "Tinadhana Sayo" – Zephanie
- "Titulo" – Jeremiah
- "Ulap" – Rob Deniel
- "Who's Gonna Love You" – Leanne & Naara
- "XOXO" – XOXO

=== Most Streamed Song ===
- **"Paubaya" – Moira Dela Torre**

=== Most Streamed Artist ===
- **Ben&Ben**

=== Dangal ng Musika Awardee ===
- **April Boy Regino**
