= Nobita (disambiguation) =

Nobita Nobi is a character from the anime and manga series Doraemon.

Nobita may also refer to:

- Nobita (band), a Filipino rock band
- Nobita, a 2004 album by Leo Ku
