= What We Could Be =

2022 Philippine television drama series

- Title card
- Genre: Romantic drama
- Written by: J-Mee Katanyag
- Directed by: Jeffrey Jeturian
- Starring: Miguel Tanfelix; Ysabel Ortega
- Theme music composer: Juan Miguel Severo
- Opening theme: "What We Could Be" by Amy Vachal
- Ending theme: "Pano" by Zack Tabudlo
- Country of origin: Philippines
- Original language: Tagalog
- No. of episodes: 40

Production
- Executive producer: Jose Mari Abacan
- Producers: Josabeth Alonso; Nilo Divina; Enrico Roque
- Production location: Taal, Batangas
- Cinematography: Ted Esperon
- Editor: Rodi Roderos
- Camera setup: Multiple-camera setup
- Running time: 30–45 minutes
- Production companies: GMA Entertainment Group; Quantum Films

Original release
- Network: GMA Network
- Release: August 29 – October 27, 2022

What We Could Be is a 2022 Philippine television drama romance series broadcast by GMA Network. Directed by Jeffrey Jeturian, it stars Miguel Tanfelix and Ysabel Ortega. It premiered on August 29, 2022 on the network's Telebabad line up. The series concluded on October 27, 2022, with a total of 40 episodes.

== Cast and characters ==
Cast

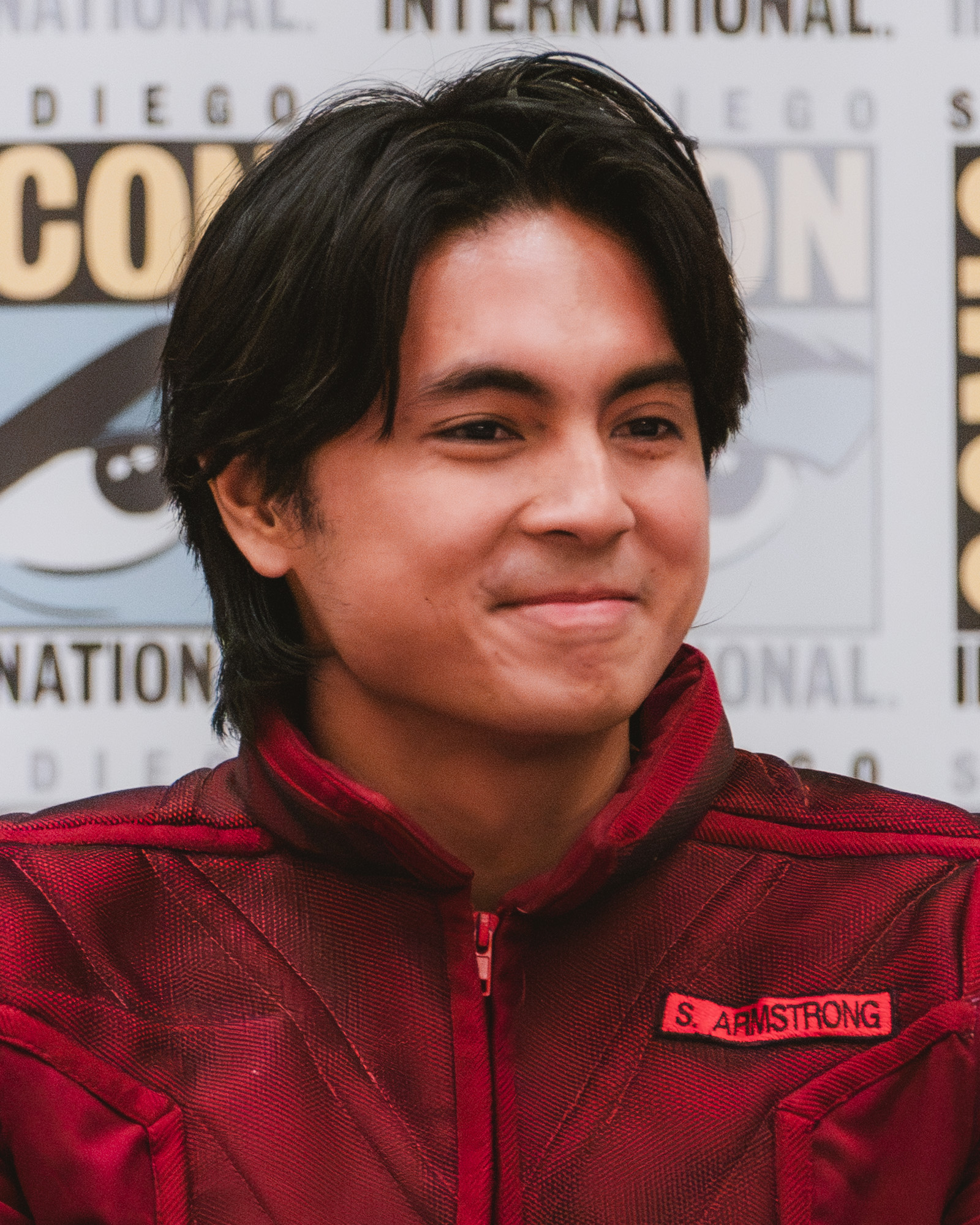
Miguel Tanfelix

Ysabel Ortega

Lead cast

- Miguel Tanfelix as Franco R. Luciano
- Ysabel Ortega as Cynthia Macaraeg-Luciano

Supporting cast

- Yasser Marta as Lucas Relosa
- Joyce Anne Burton as Helena "Helen" Relosa-Luciano
- Soliman Cruz as Tirso Macaraeg
- Aleck Bovick as Melba Macaraeg
- Bimbo Bautista as Gabriel "Gabby" Relosa
- Art Acuña as Bruno Panlilo
- Joel Saracho as Antonio "Tonyo" Cruz
- Vince Crisostomo as Justin Macaraeg
- Pamela Prinster as Criselda Garcia
- Hailey Mendes as Vera Panlilo
- Lia Salvador as Eloisa
- EJ Jallorina as Ate Vi

Guest cast

- Celeste Legaspi as Leonora "Onor" Maravilla

== Production ==
Principal photography commenced in May 2022.

== Ratings ==
According to AGB Nielsen Philippines' Nationwide Urban Television Audience Measurement People in television homes, the pilot episode of What We Could Be earned a 9.3% rating.
