= Binibini =

2021 single by Zack Tabudlo

Single by Zack Tabudlo

from the album Episode
- Language: Filipino
- Released: March 26, 2021
- Genre: Pop; soft rock; R&B; OPM
- Length: 3:41
- Label: Island Philippines; UMG Philippines
- Songwriter: Zack Tabudlo
- Producer: Zack Tabudlo

Zack Tabudlo singles chronology
"Elizabeth" (2021)	"Binibini" (2021)	"Hindi Ko Kaya" (2021)

Music video
- "Binibini" on YouTube

"Binibini" (lit. 'Young Woman') is a song by Filipino singer-songwriter Zack Tabudlo from his debut studio album, Episode (2021). It was released for streaming on March 26, 2021, via Island Records Philippines and UMG Philippines. Written and produced by Tabudlo, the Tagalog lyrics symbolize love as a dance, and tells of feelings and first times, showing the whole cycle of romance.

The song was a commercial success, as it made it into the top of local Spotify Philippines charts. It broke the record for the longest-running number 1 local track by a Filipino RADAR artist on the Philippines Top 50 Chart with six weeks, and gained global footing by topping the charts for four consecutive weeks on Global Viral.

A music video was released on April 12, 2021. Later that year, a remix, "Binibini (Last Day On Earth)", was released as a duet with James TW and features rewritten English lyrics.

== Composition ==
"Binibini" is a kundiman tune with a length of 3 minutes and 41 seconds. It features a sound of 1990s alternative rock in the bridge, where it incorporates alternative rock-styled guitar effects and melodies, according to Manilla Bulletin, who believed it accompanies the track's vibe very well. The publication also thought it had a "modern singer-songwriter flair" that created the song's "uniquely arresting sound".

In a press release, Tabudlo revealed that he had written ‘Binibini’ at the peak of a romantic relationship with a former lover. He said "She was the binibini that I would dance with in the middle of the rain, in the middle of a chaos, or whatever’s happening around us.” He likened the song to the mutual connection between two persons romantically swept away with each other, but are “waiting for the right moment to say what they feel.”

== Critical reception ==
Rolling Stone featured the song in its "10 Songs From International Hitmakers You Should Have on Your Radar".

== Commercial performance ==
In 2021, "Binibini" broke the record for the longest-running number 1 local track by a Filipino RADAR artist (an international program for emerging artists) on the Spotify Philippines' Top 50 Chart with six weeks, and gained a global audience by topping the charts for four consecutive weeks on Global Viral. In a few months, it had amassed 18.3 million streams on Spotify. It also entered the Spotify Viral charts of five foreign countries, namely Canada, Singapore, Hong Kong, Saudi Arabia and United Arab Emirates. It ended 2021 as Spotify Wrapped's Most Streamed Song in the Philippines.

On February 15, 2022, Billboard launched the Philippines Songs chart as part of its Hits of the World collection, in which "Binibini" debuted at number 13. It then peaked at number 9 on the week dated April 16. "Binibini" charted for 18 weeks in total, making its last appearance on the week ending on June 18, 2022.

== Music video ==
The music video for "Binibini" was directed by Dan Villegas and premiered on April 12, 2021. It stars Seth Fedelin and Andrea Brillantes as a young couple about to break up. Together, they relive the moments they've shared throughout the relationship as time rewinds all the way back to the day they first met. This includes a scene in which the lovers dance in the rain. Throughout the video, Tabudlo performs in heavy rain symbolizing his own experiences with a previous lover.

The music video topped the YouTube Trending charts for several weeks. As of March 21, 2024, the music video has 45 million views on YouTube.

== Other versions ==
"Binibini" has been covered by Grentperez and the a cappella group Filharmonic.

=== James TW version ===
In April 2021, James TW, known for his hit single “When You Love Someone”, released a cover of "Binibini" on TikTok. Tabudlo then shared the cover, leading to a collaboration between them, as they also shared the same label, Island Records. On June 7, 2021, Tabudlo shared a clip on Twitter of their collaboration. On June 11, "Binibini (Last Day on Earth)" was released, with rewritten English lyrics.

== Credits and personnel ==
Credits are adapted from UMG Philippines.

- Zack Tabudlo – lead vocals, backing vocals, producer, mixing engineer, mastering

== Charts ==
Weekly chart performance for "Binibini"
Chart (2022)	Peak position
Philippines (Billboard)	9
