= Mr Right (song) =

2023 single by Mae Stephens and Meghan Trainor

Single by Mae Stephens and Meghan Trainor
- Released: 4 August 2023
- Genre: Disco; bubblegum pop
- Length: 2:47
- Label: EMI
- Songwriters: Mae Stephens; Meghan Trainor; Jake Torrey; Jason Gill; Victor Rådström
- Producers: Jason Gill; Victor Rådström

Mae Stephens singles chronology
"If We Ever Broke Up" (2023)	"Mr Right" (2023)	"Jungle" (2023)

Meghan Trainor singles chronology
"Chicken Little" (2023)	"Mr Right" (2023)	"Hands on Me" (2023)

"Mr Right" is a song by British singer Mae Stephens and American singer Meghan Trainor, released on 4 August 2023 through EMI Records. Stephens and Trainor wrote it with songwriter Jake Torrey and its producers, Jason Gill and Victor Rådström.

== Background and release ==
In January 2023, Mae Stephens released her single "If We Ever Broke Up", which experienced some commercial attention due to TikTok, charting in several countries including Canada and Poland. In the meantime, Meghan Trainor also experienced commercial success with her viral TikTok hit "Made You Look" (2022). In July 2023, Trainor announced that "Mr Right", her collaboration with Stephens, would be released on 4 August 2023.

== Composition and lyrics ==
"Mr Right" is two minutes and 47 seconds long. Jason Gill and Victor Rådström produced, programmed, and engineered the song. They played guitar, drums, keyboards; Johan Ivansson played bass; and Claudia Piazza and Rachel Nutton provided the clapping. Alex Ghenea mixed it, and Jeremy Cooper mastered it.

"Mr Right" has a disco production. During her verse, Stephens expresses her opinions about the dating pool of men available to her, and adds that while she is content being alone, she is reluctantly willing to see what is available in the way of potential suitors. Trainor's part sees her declare her worth, and says that she will keep on exploring her options until a man can provide her the good treatment she deserves. Carl Smith of the Official Charts Company commented that "the earworm of a chorus, with its quirky lyricism, [details] the realisation that Mr. Right isn't always so easy to find".

== Credits and personnel ==
Credits are adapted from YouTube.

- Jason Gill – producer, songwriter, programming, engineering, guitar, drums, keyboards
- Victor Rådström – producer, songwriter, programming, engineering, guitar, drums, keyboards
- Mae Stephens – songwriter
- Meghan Trainor – songwriter
- Jake Torrey – songwriter
- Johan Ivansson – bass
- Claudia Piazza – clapping
- Rachel Nutton – clapping
- Jeremy Cooper – mastering
- Alex Ghenea – mixing

== Charts ==
Chart performance for "Mr Right"
Chart (2023)	Peak position
Croatia (HRT)	92
Japan Hot Overseas (Billboard Japan)	7
New Zealand Hot Singles (RMNZ)	15

== Release history ==
Release dates and format(s) for "Mr Right"
Region	Date	Format(s)	Label	Ref.
Various	4 August 2023	Digital download; streaming	EMI	
Italy	1 September 2023	Radio airplay	Universal	
