= Al James =

Filipino rapper and songwriter

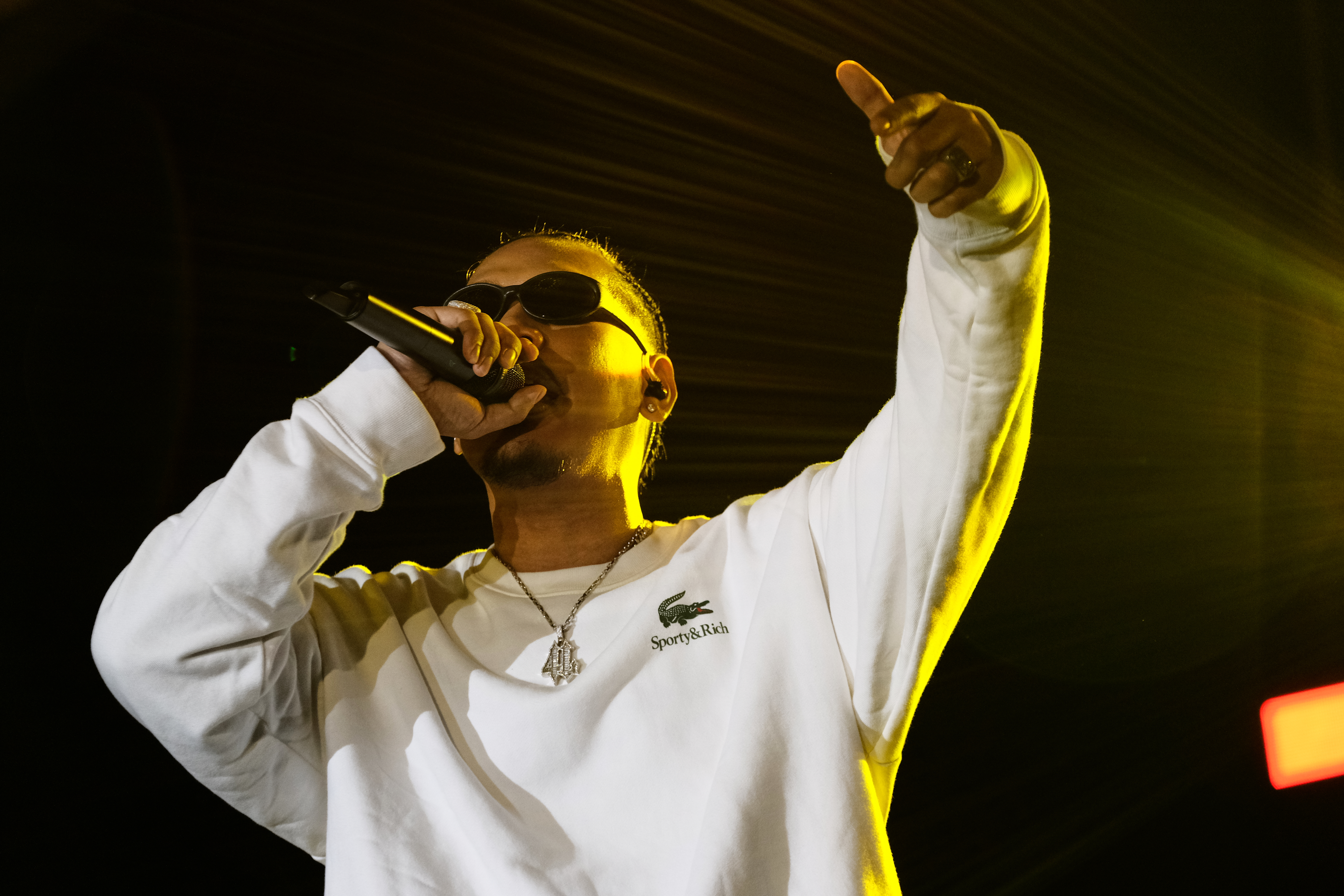
- Al James in 2024

Background information
- Born: Alvin James P. Manlutac; August 19, 1991 (age 34); Philippines
- Genres: Pinoy hip hop; Alternative hip hop; Trap
- Occupations: Rap artist; musician; songwriter
- Instrument: Vocals
- Years active: 2016–present

Alvin James P. Manlutac (born August 19, 1991), known professionally as Al James, is a Filipino rapper, singer and songwriter. He is known for his songs "Pahinga", "Pa-Umaga" and "Latina".

== Career ==
Al James graduated with a degree in fine arts and design at the University of Santo Tomas. He became involved in hip-hop where he met his collaborators, collectively known as "Baryo Berde Atbp", there. The group now has 11 members.

His exposure increased with the release of "Ngayong Gabi", collecting over 25 million views in 18 months. He was praised by Highsnobiety for "his syrupy flow and purple imagery make for a chill counterpoint to the chaos of life in this dense megacity". He has crossed over from underground to mainstream as his song "Ngayong Gabi" reached #1 on Wave 89.1's primetime hit in December 2017. So far, he is not signed with any record label. According to an interview with FHM, one of his hip-hop contemporaries he follows is Shanti Dope. He was paid to remix his own single "Pahinga" by McDonald's for their Summer Desserts advertisement campaign entitled "Palamig Ka Muna".

Following the release of the music video for "Ngayong Gabi", which was premiered on Myx, he was named as the Myx Featured Artist for October 2018.

== Discography ==
=== Singles ===
List of singles, showing year released, selected chart positions, and associated albums
Title	Year	Peak chart position	Album
Title	Year	PHL	Album
"Pahinga"	2016	—	Non-album single
"Ngayong Gabi"	2017	—	Non-album single
"Pa-Umaga"	2018	94	Non-album single
"Latina"	2019	—	Non-album single
"Repeat"	2020	—	Non-album single
"PSG"	2022	—	Non-album single
"—" denotes releases that did not chart or were not released in that region.

=== As featured artist ===
List of singles, showing year released, selected chart positions, and associated albums
Title	Year	Peak chart position	Album
Title	Year	PHL	Album
"Outthrow!" (with Shanti Dope)	2017	—	Shanti Dope
"Lagi" (with Gloc-9)	2018	—	Tulay
"Soju" (with Austin Lee)	2018	—	Non-album single
"Iladnasanwakan" (with Ron Henley)	2018	—	Non-album single
"Ilalim No. 1" (with Jim P)	2019	—	Non-album single
"Madali" (with Lola Amour)	2022	—	The Lunchtime Special
"Gusto" (with Zack Tabudlo)	2023	88	3rd Time's a Charm
"Tequila Rose" (with Hellmerry)	2024	41	Non-album single
"Yoko Na" (with Josh of SB19)	2024	—	Non-album single
"Kunan Mong Pic" (with O Side Mafia and BRGR)	2024	22	Non-album single
"—" denotes releases that did not chart or were not released in that region.

== See also ==
- Filipino hip hop
- Shanti Dope
- List of Filipino hip hop artists
