= How Bad Is Your Spotify? =

Internet bot

How Bad Is Your Spotify?, also known as How Bad Is Your Streaming Music? and Judge my Spotify, is an internet bot created by Matt Daniels of digital publication The Pudding that will roast users based on the contents of their Spotify library. It also supports Apple Music.

== Usage ==
Once the user enters their Spotify login credentials, the bot will analyze the contents of the user's Spotify library and return various stats, including a percentage-based indicator of how "basic" their taste in music is. It then proceeds to humorously roast the contents of the user's library. For example, in his writeup for Engadget, Kris Holt mentions that when a "nameless" employee at the publication used it, the bot responded that his taste in music was "your Spotify was 'please-read-my-manuscript-60-dollar-white-tshirt-local-talk-radio-bumper-sticker-bitch' bad."

== Reception ==
How Bad is Your Spotify? went viral in 2020 with users posting their results to social media platforms such as Twitter. Due to an influx of users, the creator of the app, Matt Daniels, has reported frequent crashes. It is a third party app that is integrated with an API key to get data from a user's Spotify account.

An article in The Verge described the internet bot as being "for people who find Spotify Wrapped too chipper".
