= Gusto (song) =

Single by Zack Tabudlo ft. Al James

from the album 3rd Time's a Charm
- Language: Filipino
- English title: Desire
- Released: May 26, 2023
- Genre: Pop; R&B; hip-hop
- Length: 4:20
- Label: Republic Philippines
- Songwriters: Zack Nimrod D. Tabudlo; Alvin James P. Manlutac

Zack Tabudlo singles chronology
"You & I (with Zack Tabudlo)" (2023)	"Gusto" (2023)	"Superglue (with Zack Tabudlo)" (2023)

Al James singles chronology
"Mood" (2022)	"Gusto" (2023)	"Atin-Atin Lang" (2023)

Music video
- "Zack Tabudlo – Gusto ft. Al James" on YouTube

"Gusto" (lit. 'Desire') is a song by Filipino singer-songwriter Zack Tabudlo from his third studio album, 3rd Time's a Charm (2023). The song was self-written by Tabudlo and co-produced it with Al James. Described as a "blend of pop, R&B, and hip-hop sensibilities", it delves into the perspective of someone who is infatuated but cautious about expressing their feelings to the person they admire. The song was released via Republic Records on May 26, 2023.

== Background and release ==
Tabudlo started 2023 by debuting the then-unreleased single "Akin Ka" in his performance at the 8th Wish 107.5 Music Awards, while his song "Asan Ka Na Ba" won for Rock/Alternative Song of the Year. On February 14, he released his second album Zack: For All.

On May 26, he released "Gusto", featuring Al James, as part of his third album, 3rd Time's a Charm.

== Composition ==
Tabudlo described the creation of "Gusto" as an unplanned process that began while he was playing his guitar. According to Tabudlo, the song started with an introductory riff, and the rest of the composition followed quickly. He reportedly completed writing the lyrics within two to three hours.

During the early stages of working on the song, Tabudlo decided to collaborate with rapper Al James, known for songs such as "Pa-umaga", "Repeat", and "PSG". After finishing the verse and bridge, Tabudlo felt that the song would benefit from additional rap verses and reached out to James for the collaboration. James was enthusiastic about the project and contributed to the song's final version.

Musically, the song is described as a "blend of pop, R&B, and hip-hop sensibilities", revealing the perspective of someone infatuated but cautious about expressing their feelings.

== Commercial performance ==
After its release in May 2023, "Gusto" debuted in Billboard Philippines's Hot 100 chart in 2024, placing at number 88 on the chart's week dated July 6, 2024. The song re-entered the chart again in the first week of August 2024, at number 95.

== Charts ==
Weekly peak chart positions for "Gusto"
Chart (2024)	Peak position
Philippines (Philippines Hot 100)	88

== Accolades ==
In October 2024, "Gusto" has been nominated for the Song of the Year category in at the 16th Star Awards for organized by the Philippine Movie Press Club (PMPC).
