= Nangangamba =

2020 single by Zack Tabudlo

Single by Zack Tabudlo
- Language: Tagalog
- English title: Afraid
- Released: August 7, 2020
- Genre: Pop; R&B
- Length: 3:30
- Label: Island Philippines; UMG Philippines
- Songwriter: Zack Tabudlo
- Producer: Zack Tabudlo

Zack Tabudlo singles chronology
"This Is Love" (2020)	"Nangangamba" (2020)	"Cruel" (2020)

Music video
- "Nangangamba" on YouTube

"Nangangamba" (lit. 'Afraid') is a song by Filipino singer-songwriter and multi-instrumentalist Zack Tabudlo. It was released by Island Philippines and UMG Philippines as a digital single on August 7, 2020. Written and produced by Tabudlo, it is a pop and R&B track that inspires a failed romance, where the person felt like someone they loved was playing too hard to get.

The song was a sleeper hit nearly a year later and has since positioned on several Spotify charts abroad. It debuted at number 18 at the Billboard Philippines Songs where the chart had first launched on February 19, 2022, and peaked at number 16 on April 16.

== Background ==
Between 2019 and 2020, Zack continued writing several songs including "Mahal o Biro" and "Umaasa", before having his last song with Ivory Music, titled "This Is Love."

In June 2020, Zack had signed a deal with Island Records, therefore conceived the concept for "Nangangamba". "I was going through this relationship. There was this girl I liked and she was in the same class as me", "Everything was flowing but she was playing hard to get. So I didn’t know what I was doing and because of that, I didn’t know that I had legit feelings for her." Zack explained.

== Composition ==
"Nangangamba" is three minutes and thirty seconds long, composed in the key of C# with a time signature of 4/4, and has a tempo of 98 beats per minute. Written and produced by Tabudlo, his artistic growth is influenced by his song "Nangangamba," which he wrote a year ago, inspired by an unsuccessful romance. The song revolves around the idea that when we play too hard to get someone we love, we may lose them or those who share our feelings.

The impetus for "Nangangamba" came a few days later. Zack mentioned that he was in a math class and had a mind full of chord progressions. He recorded the music using his phone and a friend's ukulele. His math teacher called out, allowing him to record the music in an impromptu session.

The song remained unfinished until a sudden inspiration while hanging out with his friends, including the object of his affection, sparked the melody. "The melody popped out", "When I got home I wrote the song in around two hours. The entire production took about in five hours." Zack enthused.

== Commercial performance ==
Following the release nearly a year later on April 24, the song became a sleeper hit, and is positioned within the top 5 of Spotify Philippines Top 50 and Philippines Viral charts. It also has attained crossover success on several charts abroad, including number 15 on Spotify Canada Viral charts, and number 20 on Spotify Saudi Arabia Viral charts.

The song debuted at number 18 on Billboard Philippines Songs where it first launched on February 19, 2022, and peaked at number 16 on April 16.

== Credits and personnel ==
Credits are adapted from Apple Music

- Zack Tabudlo — vocals, songwriter, arranger, producer, recording engineer, executive producer

== Accolades ==
Award	Year	Category	Result	Ref.
Awit Awards	2021	Best Performance by a Male Recording Artist	Nominated	
Awit Awards	2021	Record of the Year	Nominated	
Awit Awards	2021	Best Pop Recording	Nominated	
Awit Awards	2021	Best Engineered Recording	Nominated	

== Charts ==
Weekly chart performance for "Nangangamba"
Chart (2022)	Peak position
Philippines (Billboard)	16
