= If We Ever Broke Up =

2023 single by Mae Stephens

Single by Mae Stephens
- Released: 10 February 2023
- Recorded: 2022
- Genre: Pop; funk
- Length: 2:22
- Label: EMI
- Songwriters: Mae Stephens; Morien van der Tang; Gia Koka
- Producer: Morgan Avenue

Mae Stephens singles chronology
"White Lies" (2021)	"If We Ever Broke Up" (2023)	"Mr Right" (2023)

Music video
- "If We Ever Broke Up" on YouTube

"If We Ever Broke Up" is a song by British singer Mae Stephens, released on 10 February 2023 through EMI Records. The funk-pop song became her breakthrough single, going viral on TikTok and then reaching the top 20 in the UK Singles Chart, as well as charting in other countries.

== Release and reception ==
The song's official lyric video was released in February 2023. The Official Charts Company described the song as a "quirky, funk-propelled pop song" with influences from Lily Allen and Kate Nash and sounding like Dua Lipa.

== Charts ==
Chart performance for "If We Ever Broke Up"
Chart (2023)	Peak position
Australia Hitseekers (ARIA)	7
Canada (Canadian Hot 100)	89
Global 200 (Billboard)	175
Ireland (IRMA)	8
Japan Hot Overseas (Billboard Japan)	4
Latvia Airplay (LaIPA)	3
Lithuania (AGATA)	92
Netherlands (Single Top 100)	74
New Zealand Hot Singles (RMNZ)	6
Norway (VG-lista)	23
Poland (Polish Airplay Top 100)	15
San Marino (SMRTV Top 50)	44
South Korea Download (Circle)	190
Sweden (Sverigetopplistan)	63
UK Singles (Official Charts)	13

== Certifications ==
Certifications for "If We Ever Broke Up"
Region	Certification	Certified units/sales
Brazil (Pro-Música Brasil)	Platinum	40,000^{‡}
Canada (Music Canada)	Gold	40,000^{‡}
New Zealand (RMNZ)	Gold	15,000^{‡}
Poland (ZPAV)	Platinum	50,000^{‡}
United Kingdom (BPI)	Gold	400,000^{‡}
United States (RIAA)	Gold	500,000^{‡}
^{‡} Sales+streaming figures based on certification alone.
