= Episodes =

Episodes may refer to:

- Episode, a part of a dramatic work
- Episodes (TV series), a British/American television sitcom which premiered in 2011
- Episodes (journal), a geological science journal
- Episodes (ballet), a ballet by George Balanchine and Martha Graham
- Episodes (Mike Oldfield album), a compilation album by Mike Oldfield
- Episodes (Younes Elamine album), an album released by Younes Elamine in 2013

== See also ==
- Category:Lists of episodes
