= Leanne & Naara =

Indie pop/singer-songwriter duo in Metro Manila, Philippines

Leanne and Naara
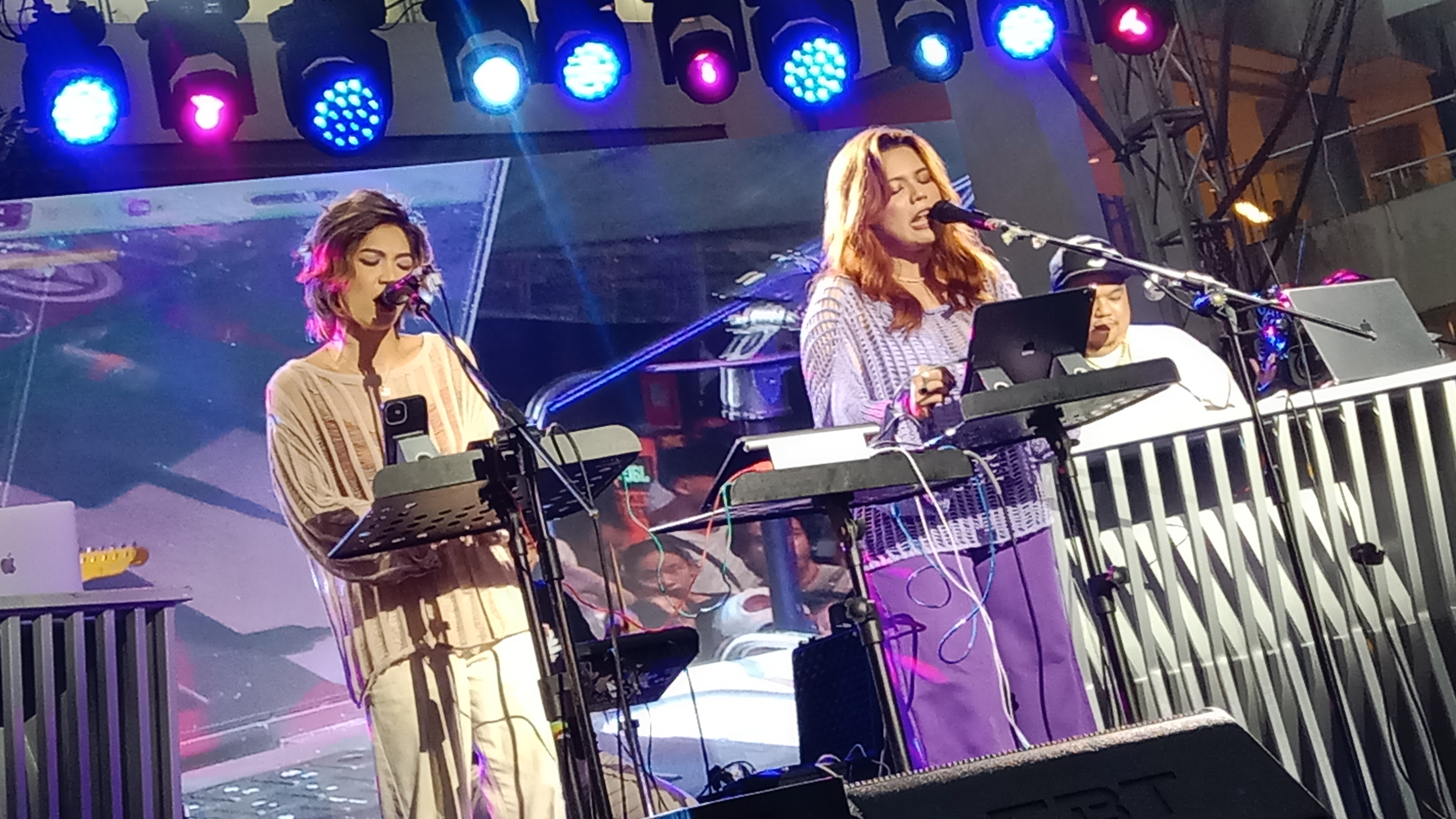
- Leanne Mamonong and Naara Acueza in 2023

Background information
- Origin: Metro Manila, Philippines
- Genres: Indie pop; R&B; Alternative R&B
- Years active: 2012–present
- Label: Warner Music Philippines
- Members: Leanne Mamonong; Naara Acueza
- Website: leanneandnaara.com

Leanne and Naara is an indie pop/singer-songwriter duo based in Metro Manila, Philippines. The duo consists of Leanne Mamonong and Naara Acueza.

Although they began their musical careers while in school, the duo began released their debut single "Again" in 2016, "New York and Back" in 2017, "Make Me Sing" and "Someday" in 2018, and "Destination" in 2019.

The duo is currently signed to Warner Music Philippines. They released their debut album Daybreak in 2020 with their leading single "Keeping Me Up".

== History ==
=== Early years ===
Mamonong and Acueza met each other in 2012 when they were both college freshmen at Assumption College San Lorenzo, taking Bachelor of Performance Arts course. The duo started their musical career when Mamonong was asked to perform at a school event, in which she felt uncomfortable to do solo but decided to tap in Acueza to accompany her. In the end, Acueza returned the favor to Mamonong by agreeing to perform at the next school events.

In 2015, a few weeks before their graduation, the duo made their first gig at a local cafe in Bonifacio Global City owned by singer/artist and entrepreneur Miguel Escueta. They performed acoustic versions/covers of popular hits at the said place on a weekly basis.

=== Breakout artists (2016–2019) ===
In 2016, a year after their graduation, they composed and released their debut single "Again". It garnered 1 million streams for 2 months and earned top spots on Spotify's Philippines Viral 50 and other countries' charts and at #12 on Global Viral 50.

In 2018, the duo released their own version of Nina's 2006 hit "Someday", which became an instant hit on both radio and streaming platforms. They would later join the Elements Music Camp alongside Ben&Ben and Reese Lansangan.

In 2019, the duo officially signed under Warner Music Philippines.

=== Daybreak, new music (2020–present) ===
In 2020, the duo released their first studio album, Daybreak, consists of 8 tracks featuring their lead singles "Keeping Me Up" and "Who's Gonna Love You". The album was co-produced in collaboration with Sonic State Audio and London-based Chasing Fantasia. The album would later win Best Album at the 34th Awit Awards.

In 2021, they released Daybreak (Live), a 13-track live album version of Daybreak including pre-2020 non-album singles accompanied by a recorded virtual concert, shot at the Maybank Theater's Globe Auditorium in BGC, Taguig. The virtual concert premiered on their official YouTube channel on September 4, 2021.

In 2024, the duo confirmed their intimate relationship amid breakup insinuations.

== Members ==
- Leanne Mamonong – vocals, keyboards
- Naara Acueza – vocals, acoustic guitars

== Discography ==
=== Studio albums ===
Year	Album	Label	Ref.
2020	Daybreak	Warner Music Philippines	

=== Live albums ===
Year	Album	Label	Ref.
2021	Daybreak (Live)	Warner Music Philippines	

=== Singles ===
Year	Single	Album
2016	"Again"	Non-album singles
2017	"New York and Back"	Non-album singles
2017	"Run Run"	Non-album singles
2018	"Make Me Sing"	Non-album singles
2018	"Someday"	Non-album singles
2018	"Rest"	Non-album singles
2019	"Destination" (feat. Asch)	Non-album singles
2020	"Evergreen"	Non-album singles
2020	"Keeping Me Up"	Daybreak
2020	"Who's Gonna Love You"	Daybreak
2021	"Anticipation"	Non-album singles
2022	"The One"	Non-album singles
2022	"Unan"	Non-album singles
2022	"Unan (Acoustic)"	Non-album singles
2023	"Di Na Babalik"	Non-album singles

As featured artists

Year	Single
2022	"Click" (with Lola Amour)

== Accolades ==
Year	Award	Category	Recipient	Result	Ref.
2018	31st Awit Awards	Best Pop Recording	"Run Run"	Won	
2018	Wish Music Awards	Wishclusive Urban Performance of the Year	"Run Run"	Nominated	
2021	34th Awit Awards	Album of the Year	Daybreak	Won	
2021	34th Awit Awards	Best R&B Recording	"Too Soon"	Won	
2022	35th Awit Awards	Record of the Year	"Anticipation"	Won	
2022	35th Awit Awards	Best R&B Recording	"Anticipation"	Won	
