= Mae Stephens =

British singer

- Born: Anna Mae Kelly; 24 March 2003 (age 23); Kettering, Northamptonshire, England
- Genres: Pop
- Occupation: Singer-Songwriter
- Years active: 2020–present
- Label: EMI
- Website: maestephens.com

Anna Mae Kelly (born 24 March 2003), better known as Mae Stephens, is an English pop singer. She peaked at number 13 on the UK Singles Chart in 2023 with her pop-funk single "If We Ever Broke Up", which initially gained popularity after being teased on Mae Stephens' TikTok account.

Mae Stephens is from Kettering, Northamptonshire. She regards Freddie Mercury and Sigrid among her musical influences.

== Career ==
As Anna Mae Kelly, she self-released two songs called "I Want You to Be Here" and "Devil Eyes" in March and April 2020 respectively. These were followed by two more self-released songs as Mae Stephens entitled "Infamous Kiss" (September 2020) and "White Lies" (March 2021). In 2021, Stephens was interviewed by the BBC about performing during the COVID-19 pandemic.

In December 2022, Stephens released snippets of her song "If We Ever Broke Up" to TikTok. The clips went viral during January 2023. Shortly afterward Stephens was signed to EMI and "If We Ever Broke Up" was released as a full single in February 2023. Stephens also recorded the song ″Out of the Shadows″ for the video game remastered version of Until Dawn.

The singer Mae Stephens released her debut EP Securely Insecure on August 2nd, with the lead single "Small Town Syndrome" released on July 12th.

== Discography ==
=== Extended plays ===
Title	Details
Securely Insecure	Released: 2 August 2024; Label: EMI Records; Formats: Digital download, streaming

=== Singles ===
List of singles, with selected chart positions
Title	Year	Peak chart positions									Certifications	Album
Title	Year	UK	CAN	IRE	LIT	NLD	NOR	NZ Hot	POL	SWE	Certifications	Album
"I Want You to Be Here"	2020	—	—	—	—	—	—	—	—	—		Non-album singles
"Devil Eyes"	2020	—	—	—	—	—	—	—	—	—		Non-album singles
"Infamous Kiss"	2020	—	—	—	—	—	—	—	—	—		Non-album singles
"White Lies"	2021	—	—	—	—	—	—	—	—	—		Non-album singles
"If We Ever Broke Up"	2023	13	89	8	95	74	23	6	15	63	BPI: Silver; ZPAV: Platinum; RIAA: Gold	Non-album singles
"Mr Right" (with Meghan Trainor)	2023	—	—	—	—	—	—	15	—	—		Non-album singles
"Jungle" (with Alok and The Chainsmokers)	2023	—	—	—	—	28	—	29	3	—	ZPAV: Platinum	Summertime Friends
"Cheeky but Charming" (featuring Kuromi)	2023	—	—	—	—	—	—	—	—	—		Non-album singles
"ADHD"	2024	—	—	—	—	—	—	—	—	—		Non-album singles
"Make Me Your Mrs"	2024	—	—	—	—	—	—	—	—	—		Non-album singles
"Small Town Syndrome"	2024	—	—	—	—	—	—	—	—	—		Securely Insecure
"Out of the Shadows" (from Until Dawn (2024))	2024	—	—	—	—	—	—	—	—	—		TBA
"Woah Man!"	2025	—	—	—	—	—	—	—	—	—		TBA
"Tiny Voice"	2025	—	—	—	—	—	—	—	—	—		TBA
"Done With U"	2025	—	—	—	—	—	—	—	—	—		TBA
"Earn It"	2026	—	—	—	—	—	—	—	—	—		TBA
"—" denotes releases that did not chart or were not released in that territory.
