= Episode (Zack Tabudlo album) =

Studio album by Zack Tabudlo
- Released: October 15, 2021
- Genre: Pop, OPM
- Length: 50:48
- Label: Island Records Philippines; MCA Music
- Producer: Zack Tabudlo

Zack Tabudlo chronology
Episode (2021)	For All (2023)

Singles from Episode
- 1. "Elizabeth" Released: February 26, 2021; 2. "Binibini" Released: March 26, 2021; 3. "Hindi Ko Kaya" Released: May 14, 2021; 4. "Habang Buhay" Released: September 17, 2021; 5. "Ba't Ganito ang Pag-ibig" Released: October 8, 2021

Episode is the debut studio album of Filipino singer-songwriter Zack Tabudlo. It was released on October 15, 2021, under Island Records Philippines and distributed by MCA Music.

The album features 14 tracks, including the hit single "Binibini" which broke a record as the top local song on Spotify's Philippines charts. The album has been highly acclaimed by music critics.

== Recording ==
Before the release, Tabudlo had been writing and producing his tracks for the album based on "many emotions" about life, love and heartbreaks.

== Promotion ==
Before the release of his album, Tabudlo released a series of music videos for all of its tracks in the form of "episodes" or "stories" that were uploaded on his official YouTube channel. It features celebrities such as Andrea Brillantes, Seth Fedelin, Paulo Avelino, Charlie Dizon, Cong TV and Viy Cortez of Team Payaman, James Reid, and others.

The album's artwork was designed by designer-illustrator John Ed De Vera.

He would later promote the album through his digital online concert on December 23, 2021.

== Track listing ==
Note: all tracks are written and produced by Tabudlo.

No.	Title	Length
1.	"Heart Can't Lose"	4:01
2.	"Para sa Mga Ex"	3:25
3.	"Lost"	2:35
4.	"Hindi Ko Kaya"	3:17
5.	"Calm Me Down"	4:43
6.	"Binibini"	3:42
7.	"Ba't Ganto ang Pag-ibig"	3:14
8.	"Habang Buhay"	4:05
9.	"Elizabeth"	3:15
10.	"Simula Palang Nung Una"	4:20
11.	"First & Last"	3:13
12.	"Huwag Mong Pahulain"	3:24
13.	"High"	3:29
14.	"Give Me Your Forever"	4:05
Total length:		50:48
