= Zack Tabudlo =

Filipino singer-songwriter (born 2001)

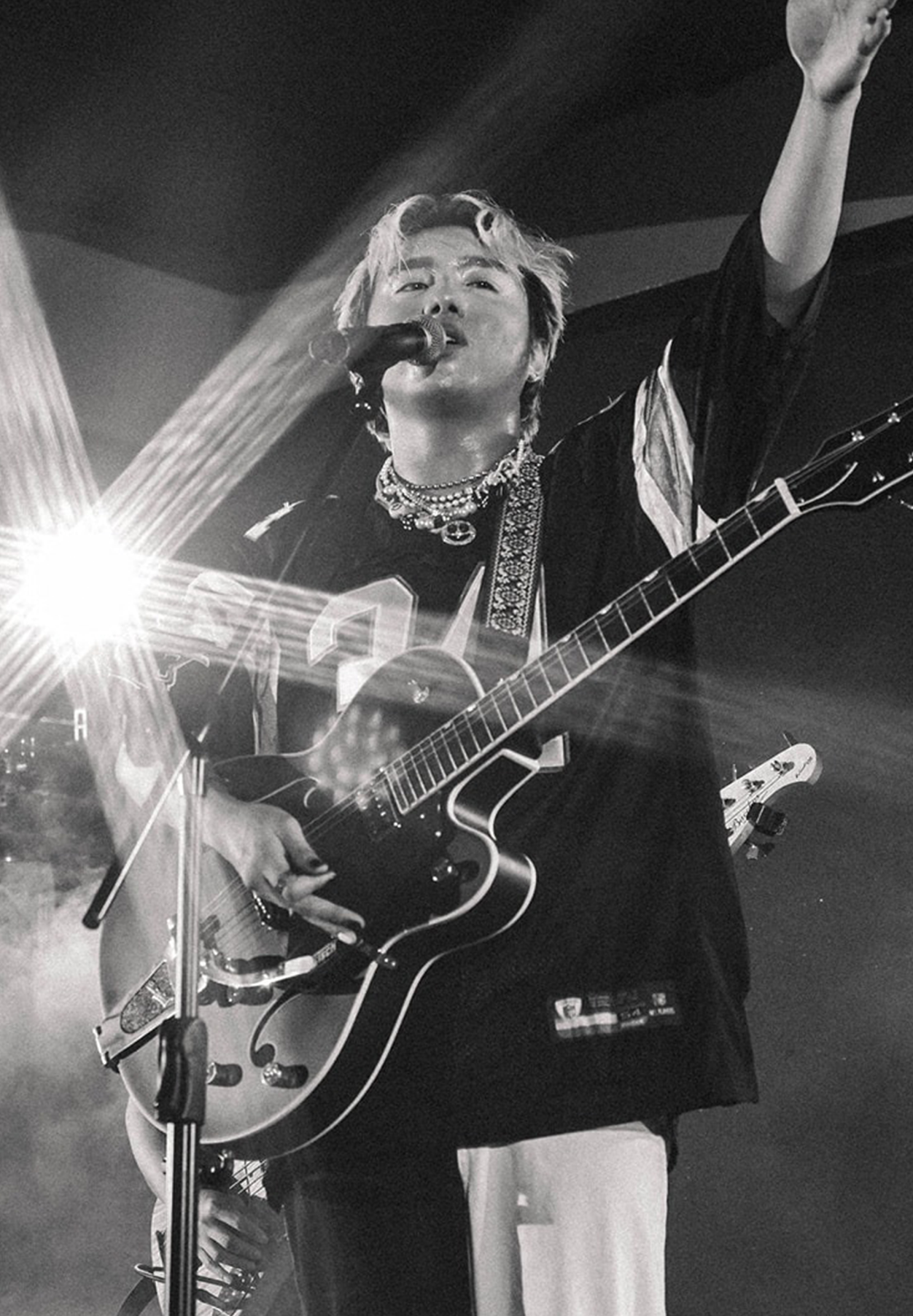
- Tabudlo in 2022
- Born: Zack Tabudlo; December 6, 2001 (age 24); Las Piñas, Metro Manila, Philippines
- Occupations: Singer; songwriter; musician; record producer
- Years active: 2014–present
- Musical career
- Origin: Manila, Philippines
- Genres: OPM; pop; R&B
- Instrument: Multi-instrumentalist
- Labels: Ivory; Island; UMG; Republic; Mercury
- Website: zacktabudlo.com

Zack Tabudlo (born December 6, 2001) is a Filipino singer and songwriter currently signed with Mercury Records. He was first seen as a contestant on the first season of The Voice Kids under Bamboo Mañalac's mentorship, where he was eliminated in the competition's second round. He later began his musical career in 2018 before he rose to fame in 2020 when he joined MCA Music (now UMG Philippines) through sub-label Island Records Philippines.

His debut single "Nangangamba" was released in 2020. His song "Binibini" ("Young Woman"), released in 2021, broke a record as the top local song on Spotify's Philippines charts. His debut album, Episode, was released on October 15, 2021. His track "Pano" ("How") became the longest-running number-one OPM song on Spotify Philippines, the first number-one song to debut on the Billboard Philippines Songs chart, and charted in other Southeast Asian countries, including Malaysia, Thailand, and Vietnam.

In 2022, Tabudlo became one of the artists signed to the Republic Records Philippines label under UMG Philippines. On February 20, 2022, he performed at the Expo 2020 Dubai. The following year, he released his track "Akin Ka" ("You Are Mine") in anticipation of his second studio album Zack: For All released on February 14. Aside from For All, he also released another album, Third Time's a Charm, that year.

== Early life ==
Zack Tabudlo was born on December 6, 2001 to a music-loving family. His father was a member of a band during his college days, while his sister and grandmother also possessed singing talents. His mother, a hotel singer, gave him a guitar which he learned to play by watching YouTube videos.

== Music career ==
=== 2014–2017: Singing competitions, Gravity, and Zack and Fritz ===
At the age of 10, Tabudlo competed and became a finalist on the televised talent competition Talentadong Pinoy. In 2014, at age 12, he auditioned for the first season of The Voice Kids with Maroon 5's "Sunday Morning". Only Bamboo Mañalac turned his chair, making him Tabudlo's coach by default. He advanced to the Battle Rounds, where he, Rommel Bautista, and Gem Capalad performed The Jackson 5's "I'll Be There". Capalad advanced, while Tabudlo and Bautista were eliminated.

Tabudlo's performances on The Voice Kids
Round	Song	Original Artist	Date	Result
Blind Audition	"Sunday Morning"	Maroon 5	May 25, 2014	Joined Team Bamboo by default
Battle Round	"I'll Be There" (vs. Rommel Bautista and Gem Capalad)	The Jackson 5	July 6, 2014	Eliminated

His experience on The Voice Kids motivated him to continue performing. His father encouraged him to channel his frustrations into songwriting. He then formed a singing group with other The Voice Kids alumni called Gravity, for which he wrote the song "Imposible," a pop track that explores unrequited love, and was a hit on local radio stations. The group eventually disbanded. He and Gravity member Eufritz Santos then formed a duo, Zack and Fritz. They released one song, "Ikaw ang Pangarap Ko," ("You Are My Dream") before also parting ways.

=== 2018–2020: Ghost producing and beginning of solo career ===
Tabudlo then worked for two years with various foreign artists as a ghost producer. As a ghost producer, he never got any credit for his work, but did get an offer for residency in the United States, which he turned down. He eventually stopped ghost producing with encouragement from his father, who was now also his manager. His father also encouraged him to write more Tagalog songs. He continued producing songs with Jonathan Ong and Chris Anthony Vinzons of Sonic State Studio.

In 2019, Tabudlo wrote several songs including "Mahal o Biro" ("Love or a Joke") and "Umaasa" ("Hoping"). He then collaborated with Sharlene San Pedro on the song "Everything Will Be Alright". They collaborated once again on the song "Pusong Naliligaw" ("Lost Heart"), which they got to perform on iWant ASAP.

=== 2020–2022: Breakout years, Episode, and Republic Records ===
In 2020, Tabudlo signed on to Spotify's RADAR program, which is aimed at helping local artists gain more recognition. He also signed on to Island Records Philippines that year, becoming the first artist signed by the label. His debut single for Island Records was "Nangangamba" ("Worried"). It gradually gained listeners, then went viral on TikTok.

On February 12, 2021, Tabudlo released his first single of the year "Iyong-Iyo" ("Completely Yours"). This was followed by "Elizabeth", an 80's sounding single inspired by actress Liza Soberano. On March 26, "Binibini" was released. A music video followed several days later. "Binibini" went on to become the longest-running number #1 local track by a Filipino RADAR artist on Spotify Philippines Top 50 chart. It also made it onto other Spotify charts in other countries including Canada, Singapore, Hong Kong, Saudi Arabia and the United Arab Emirates. Its success led to a new version featuring the vocals of James TW and new lyrics written in English.

Tabudlo got to join the virtual YouTube FanFest that year. At the beginning of October, he announced that he would be releasing his debut album that month. On October 15, 2021, his debut album Episode was released, with all 14 tracks on the album getting a music video. It contained themes including heartbreak, anxiety, happiness, and other emotions. On December 6, he released the single "Pano" ("How"). He closed out the year with a performance at the BYE 2021 virtual concert, which included a duet of "Give Me Your Forever" with Thai singer and actor Billkin. A month later, they would release an official version of that duet.

Tabudlo started 2022 by releasing "Hatdog", a collaboration with James Reid, on New Year's Day. He then won Breakthrough Artist of the Year at the 7th Wish 107.5 Music Awards. In February, he released his duet with Moira Dela Torre "Iba" ("Someone Else"). Later that month, Billboard launched the Philippines Songs chart. On its first week, two of his songs took the top spots with "Pano" claiming #1, and "Habang Buhay" claiming #2. "Pano" went on to stay at No. 1 for eleven consecutive weeks. Later that month, he performed in the Expo 2020 Dubai. He then staged a free digital concert called "Sabihin Mo Na" ("Just Say It") on his YouTube channel. On April 29, he released his single "As You Are". He then toured the United States with December Avenue.

On July 9, Tabudlo became one of the artists in the newly launched Republic Records Philippines label under UMG Philippines. His first single under that label was "Yakap" ("Hug"), which was then followed by "Pero" ("But"). October of that year was a busy month for him as he released three music videos and also released singles featuring Indonesian singer Tiara Andini and Malaysian rapper Yonnyboii respectively. More milestones also came for his hit "Pano", as it got its own music video and became the first Filipino song to enter Spotify Malaysia's Top 50. He also got to perform with LANY when the band held a concert in the Philippines. On November 29, he released "Pinadama" ("Made Me Feel") which featured on the soundtrack of the film An Inconvenient Love. He then closed out the year with a performance at the Head in the Clouds Festival in Manila. For 2022, he was the most-streamed local artist in the Philippines. His music video for "Asan Ka Na Ba?" ("Where Are You Now?") was among YouTube Philippines's most-viewed music videos for that year, while "Pano" was the most-listened to song in the country on YouTube.

=== 2023–2024: Zack: For All and Third Time's a Charm ===
Tabudlo started 2023 by debuting the single "Akin Ka" in his performance at the 8th Wish 107.5 Music Awards, while his song "Asan Ka Na Ba" took home Rock/Alternative Song of the Year. On February 14, he released his second album Zack: For All. On May 26, he released "Gusto" ("Desire"), which featured Filipino rapper Al James. He also collaborated with many international artists that year including Johnny Orlando, Joan, Mae Stephens, Violette Wautier, and more. He then joined Coke Studio's international program as its first Filipino artist, and got the opportunity to collaborate with South African rapper Nasty C on "Fallin'". That year, he became the first Filipino male solo artist to achieve one billion Spotify streams.

Tabudlo released several more solo singles in 2023 including "Delulu" (Filipino slang for "Delusional"), and "Ako Nalang Kasi" ("Just Choose Me Instead"). On October 14, he held a concert at Bonifacio Global City (BGC) to celebrate Episode's second anniversary of its release. The event went on break the record for biggest audience at a music event held in BGC with over 10,000 in attendance. He then started a world tour called "The Morning Tour" beginning in North America. On November 10, he released his lead single for his third album "Victim". A week later on November 17, he released his third album Third Time's a Charm. Once again, he was the most-streamed male local artist for the year.

On January 12, 2024, Tabudlo released his first song of the year "Pulso" ("Pulse"). He also continued "The Morning Tour" with a show in Singapore and held his first major concert at the Mall of Asia Arena. On May 17, he released his comeback single "Feel This Way". On August 16, he released another single "Isa Dalawa Tatlo" ("One Two Three").

=== 2025: Mercury Records ===
On February 19, 2025, it was announced that Tabudlo had signed with Mercury Records. After several months of no new releases, he released a new single a day after the signing, "Diving", which was accompanied with a music video. On April 30, he released another single "Manloloko" ("Deceiver"), a track about the pain of betrayal and moving on that he had initially teased in 2024. In May, he joined 88rising's Road to FAM tour, which included stops in Manila and a finale that will be held in Bangkok on July 9. On July 30, it was officially confirmed that Tabudlo would join the seventh season of The Voice Kids, eleven years after he had competed in the first season of The Voice Kids. The winner of the season, Sofia Mallares, was coached by Tabudlo.

== Artistry ==
=== Influences ===
Tabudlo has cited LANY, John Mayer, Shawn Mendes, Bamboo Mañalac, Ed Sheeran, and Charlie Puth as his influences. For his second album, he cited more influences to his music such as James Brown, Bruno Mars, Anderson .Paak, Harry Styles, and Michael Jackson, and OPM artists April Boy Regino, and VST & Company. The American alt-pop duo joan has also been what he calls his "musical heroes" as he listened to their songs when he was going through his first heartbreak. He had actually wanted to produce music with them when he was 16 before getting the chance to work with them on the track "Superglue" in 2023. He has also had several mentors including Moira Dela Torre and producers Jonathan Ong, Chris Anthony Vinzons, and Cleng Saturno.

=== Musical style ===
Tabudlo is described as having powerful and soulful vocals. His vocals are also multi-range, capable of going up to falsetto. He blends genres such as R&B, soft rock, funk and vocally driven pop. When writing songs, Tabudlo often focuses on his experiences. For his album Zack: For All, he focused instead on a specific sound and feel that he wanted. The songs he writes are often described as "hugot" songs, deeply emotional songs, making them relatable for audiences.

== Personal life ==
Tabudlo is currently in a relationship with his non-showbiz girlfriend. His girlfriend is the subject of his songs "Pulso" and "Feel This Way". He lives with two bulldogs.

In 2020, Tabudlo started college at the University of Perpetual Help in Las Piñas. He was in his first year of college studying Mass Communication when he had to stop schooling as he got busier with his music career.

== Awards and nominations ==
Awards and nominations received by Zack Tabudlo
Award	Year (Note: Indicates the year of ceremony. Each year is linked to the article about the awards held that year, wherever possible.)	Recipient	Category	Result	Ref(s)
Awit Awards	2021	Nangangamba	Best Performance by a Male Recording Artist	Nominated	
Awit Awards	2021	Nangangamba	Record of the Year	Nominated	
Awit Awards	2021	Nangangamba	Pop Record of the Year	Nominated	
Awit Awards	2021	Nangangamba	Best Engineered Recording	Nominated	
Awit Awards	2022	Habang Buhay	Record of the Year	Nominated	
Awit Awards	2022	Episode	Album of the Year	Nominated	
Awit Awards	2022	Binibini	Song of the Year	Won	
New Hue Music Awards	2022	Zack Tabudlo	Best Male Artist	Nominated	
New Hue Music Awards	2022	Zack Tabudlo	Listener's Choice Award	Nominated	
New Hue Music Awards	2023	Zack Tabudlo	Best Male Artist	Nominated	
New Hue Music Awards	2023	Zack Tabudlo	Listener's Choice Award	Won	
New Hue Music Awards	2023	Asan Ka Na Ba	Music Video of the Year	Nominated	
New Hue Music Awards	2024	Zack Tabudlo	Best Male Artist	Nominated	
New Hue Music Awards	2024	Gusto (with Al James)	Song of the Year	Nominated	
PMPC Star Awards for Music	2020	Zack Tabudlo	R&B Artist of the Year	Nominated	
PMPC Star Awards for Music	2021	Pusong Naliligaw (with Sharlene San Pedro)	Song of the Year	Nominated	
PMPC Star Awards for Music	2023	Binibini	Male Recording Artist of the Year	Won	
PMPC Star Awards for Music	2023	Episode	R&B Album of the Year	Won	
PMPC Star Awards for Music	2024	Give Me Your Forever	Song of the Year	Nominated	
PMPC Star Awards for Music	2024	Zack Tabudlo	Male Recording Artist of the Year	Nominated	
PMPC Star Awards for Music	2024	Iba (with Moira Dela Torre)	Collaboration of the Year	Nominated	
Wish 107.5 Music Awards	2022	Binibini	Wishclusive Rock/Alternative Performance of the Year	Nominated	
Wish 107.5 Music Awards	2022	Zack Tabudlo	Wish Breakthrough Artist of the Year	Won	
Wish 107.5 Music Awards	2023	Give Me Your Forever	Wishclusive Ballad Performance of the Year	Nominated	
Wish 107.5 Music Awards	2023	Asan Ka Na Ba	Wish Rock/Alternative Song of the Year	Won	
Wish 107.5 Music Awards	2023	Iba (with Moira Dela Torre)	Wish Song Collaboration of the Year	Nominated	
Wish 107.5 Music Awards	2023	Zack Tabudlo	Wish Artist of the Year	Nominated	
Wish 107.5 Music Awards	2024	Gusto (with Al James)	Wish Song Collaboration of the Year	Nominated	
Wish 107.5 Music Awards	2024	Pano	Wishclusive Contemporary R&B Performance of the Year	Won	

=== Listicles ===
Name of publisher, name of listicle, year(s) listed, and placement result
Publisher	Listicle	Year(s)	Result	Ref.
Forbes Asia	30 Under 30	2026	Included	

== Discography ==
=== Studio albums ===
List of studio albums with selected details
Title	Album Details
Episode	Released: October 15, 2021 (PH); Label: Island Records Philippines, MCA Music, UMG; Format: Digital download, streaming media, UFD
Zack: For All	Released: February 14, 2023 (PH); Label: Universal Music Philippines Inc.; Format: Digital download, streaming media, UFD
3rd Time's a Charm	Released: November 17, 2023 (PH); Label: Universal Music Philippines Inc.; Format: Digital download, streaming media, UFD

=== Singles ===
==== As a lead artist ====
List of singles, showing year released, selected chart positions, and name of the album
Title	Year	Peak chart positions		Album
Title	Year	PHL (Note: The Billboard Philippines Songs chart was first introduced in February 2022; discontinued after the relaunch of Philippines Hot 100 chart.)	MLY Songs (Note: The Billboard Malaysia Songs chart was first introduced in February 2022.)	Album
"Stay Here"	2018	—	—	Non-album singles
"Sa'yo"	2018	—	—	Non-album singles
"The Way You Wanted"	2018	—	—	Non-album singles
"You Won't See Me Crying" (featuring ABY)	2019	—	—	Non-album singles
"Mahal o Biro"	2019	—	—	Non-album singles
"Umaasa"	2019	—	—	Non-album singles
"This Is Love"	2020	—	—	Non-album singles
"Nangangamba"	2020	16	—	Non-album singles
"Cruel"	2020	—	—	Non-album singles
"Sigurado"	2020	—	—	Non-album singles
"Iyong Iyo"	2021	—	—	Non-album singles
"Elizabeth"	2021	—	—	Episode
"Binibini"	2021	9	—	Episode
"Hindi Ko Kaya"	2021	—	—	Episode
"Binibini (Last Day on Earth)" (featuring James TW)	2021	—	—	Non-album single
"Habang Buhay"	2021	2	—	Episode
"Ba't Ganito ang Pag-ibig"	2021	—	—	Episode
"Give Me Your Forever"	2021	21	—	Episode
"Pano"	2021	1	19	3rd Time's a Charm
"Hatdog" (featuring James Reid)	2022	—	—	Non-album singles
"Iba" (featuring Moira Dela Torre)	2022	—	—	Non-album singles
"Asan Ka Na Ba?"	2022	3	—	3rd Time's a Charm
"As You Are"	2022	—	—	Non-album singles
"Anghel"	2022	—	—	Non-album singles
"Yakap"	2022	—	—	3rd Time's a Charm
"Pero"	2022	—	—	Non-album singles
"By My Side" (featuring Tiara Andini)	2022	—	—	Non-album singles
"Take Me Back" (featuring Yonnyboii)	2022	—	—	For All
"Akin Ka"	2023	—	—	For All
"Diyosa"	2023	—	—	For All
"Diba"	2023	—	—	For All
"Gusto" (featuring Al James)	2023	2	—	3rd Time's a Charm
"Ako Nalang Kasi"	2023	—	—	3rd Time's a Charm
"Delulu"	2023	—	—	3rd Time's a Charm
"Turn Back Time" (featuring Violette Wautier)	2023	—	—	3rd Time's a Charm
"Victim"	2023	—	—	3rd Time's a Charm
"Pulso"	2024	—	—	Non-album singles
"Papalayo"	2024	—	—	Non-album singles
"Feel this Way"	2024	—	—	Non-album singles
"Isa Dalawa Tatlo"	2024	—	—	Non-album singles
"Diving"	2025	—	—	Non-album singles
"Manloloko"	2025	—	—	Non-album singles
"Tunay" (featuring Nateman, Robledo Timido, and Paul N Ballin)	2026	—	—	Non-album singles
"Isang Tulad Mo"	2026	—	—	
"Tsaka Nalang"	2026	—	—	

==== As a featured artist ====
List of singles, with year released and album name shown
Title	Year	Peak chart position	Album
Title	Year	PHL Songs	Album
"Pusong Naliligaw" (with Sharlene San Pedro)	2019	—	Non-album singles
"You & I" (with Diego Gonzales)	2023	—	Non-album singles

=== Promotional singles ===
List of promotional singles, showing year released and associated albums
Title	Year	Album
"Pinadama"	2022	An Inconvenient Love
"Someone Will Love You Better (Zack Tabudlo version)" (With Johnny Orlando)	2023	Non-album singles
"Superglue (Stripped Version)" (With Joan)	2023	Non-album singles
"If We Ever Broke Up (Zack Tabudlo remix)" (With Mae Stephens)	2023	Non-album singles
"Fallin'" (With Nasty C)	2023	Coke Studio

=== Production and songwriting credits ===
Title	Year	Artist	Album	Credits
"Balisong"	2019	Carlo Aquino	Non-album singles	Producer and arranger
"Tama Na"	2021	Darren Espanto	Non-album singles	Producer and writer
"Aalis Ka Ba"	2024	I Belong to the Zoo	afteryou.	Co-producer and co-writer
"Tanga"	2025	Kaia	Non-album single	Producer and writer
