= Spotify Wrapped =

Spotify viral marketing campaign

- 2025 Spotify Wrapped banner

- 2020 edition screenshot
- Dates: Released between November 29 and December 6
- Frequency: Annual
- Years active: 2016–present
- Type: Marketing campaign
- Website: spotify.com/wrapped

Spotify Wrapped is a year-in-review feature and viral marketing campaign hosted by Spotify every year since 2016. Typically released in late November or early December, it allows users to view a summary of their activity on the platform over the past year, which can then be shared on social media.

Spotify Wrapped typically includes the five musicians, songs, and musical genres that a Spotify user listened to the most throughout the previous year. Producers of content on the platform also have access to a version of Spotify Wrapped, which includes the number of times their content has been streamed that year. In addition to individualized data, Spotify Wrapped also includes information about activity on the Spotify platform as a whole. While Spotify Wrapped is commonly referred to as an annual collection of data, only activity from January 1st to mid-November is counted for any given year.

Spotify Wrapped is shared widely on social media each year and has led millions of people to promote Spotify on their social media accounts. Its release is generally accompanied by billboards and television advertisements and has historically correlated with a boost to Spotify's app store ranking. The marketing campaign has been both praised and criticized for effectively providing Spotify with free advertising and has been discussed in connection with broader questions about data and Spotify's use of it. Commentators have also analyzed the effects of Spotify Wrapped on the music industry and contrasted it with offerings by other streaming services.

== Purpose ==
Spotify Wrapped is intended to promote Spotify. In addition to promoting the music streaming service by encouraging users to share about it on social media, the campaign has developed into a unique feature that is different from the offerings of rivals including Apple Music. In 2019, Spotify's head of marketing described this phenomenon as a "FOMO effect" which has encouraged people to use Spotify over other music apps.

== Structure ==
Spotify Wrapped allows both Spotify users and producers on the platform to view a compilation of data about trends on the platform as well as their activity on the platform over the past year, (Note: According to Spotify, the Spotify Wrapped for a given year includes data from between January 1 and October 31 of that year, though they've been collecting data past that since 2022.) then invites them to share it on social media including Instagram. Structurally, it consists of a series of sequential screens of information, with the last one containing the invitation to share the previous pages. Users can view information about their most-listened-to songs and artists as well as their favorite music genres; producers are invited to share the number and location of streams of their content. The data is organized in a visually appealing way, intended to boost engagement and encourage viewers to share the campaign on social media, which benefits Spotify. In November 2025, Spotify introduced a similar feature called "Listening Stats", which gives users weekly and monthly review of their top songs and artists.

While Spotify Wrapped is commonly referred to as an annual collection of data, Billboard and Newsweek have reported that only activity from between January 1 and October 31 of a given year is included. In 2021, a Spotify official told Newsweek that the reasons for activity tracking ending in October as opposed to December are logistical because time is needed for quality assurance and other preparation. However, in October 2023, Spotify stated on Twitter that "Wrapped is still counting past Oct. 31".

== History ==
The campaign began in December 2016, and has been promoted by Spotify every December since that year. It was preceded in 2015 by a similar but less developed campaign called "Year in Music". In 2017, it was expanded to include artists and advertisers on Spotify in addition to consumers; in 2019, it was built into the Spotify application.

Released in the first week of December each year, Spotify Wrapped has become popular, and is shared widely on social media each year, as are related memes. The viral marketing campaign has led millions of people to promote Spotify on their social media accounts without being paid by the company. Traditional marketing efforts such as billboards and television advertisements have also been used alongside the digital campaign.

Spotify Wrapped has historically included the five artists a user has listened to most often and the songs they have listened to most often. In 2018, Spotify included information about the astrological signs of the artists a user listened to most and the oldest song a user listened to. In 2019, Spotify Wrapped began using a new format modeled after social media stories. In 2020, it included new metrics related to the podcasts a user had listened to, as well as quizzes and three personalized playlists; Premium users could earn three different digital badges related to their listening over the previous year. Also in 2020, Spotify created social media features to accompany the campaign including a hashtag challenge on TikTok and custom filters on Snapchat and Instagram, and recruited internet celebrities to promote the campaign. In 2021, Spotify Wrapped included various internet slang phrases and referenced topics from popular culture including non-fungible tokens and skincare routines, spawning jokes and memes which made fun of the language used in the marketing campaign.

=== Social media story format ===
In 2019, Spotify began modeling Spotify Wrapped after social media stories, allowing the data to easily be shared on Instagram. In 2020, artist Jewel Ham claimed to have developed the story format for Spotify Wrapped during a three-month internship at Spotify in 2019, and stated that she had not received credit for the idea; a Spotify spokesperson denied the claim, telling Refinery29 that "while ideas generated during Spotify's internship program have on occasion informed campaigns and products, based on our internal review, that is not the case here with Spotify Wrapped."

=== Release dates ===
Since its inception in 2016, Spotify Wrapped has been released on the following dates:

- 2016 – Tuesday, December 6
- 2017 – Tuesday, December 5
- 2018 – Thursday, December 6
- 2019 – Thursday, December 5
- 2020 – Tuesday, December 1
- 2021 – Wednesday, December 1
- 2022 – Wednesday, November 30
- 2023 – Wednesday, November 29
- 2024 – Wednesday, December 4
- 2025 – Wednesday, December 3

== Responses ==
The release of Spotify Wrapped in early December each year has historically correlated with a boost to Spotify's app store ranking. Users' emotional responses to Spotify Wrapped vary. Some express excitement about the opportunity to share their own statistics, while others find the data embarrassing.

=== On social media ===
In 2018, Spotify's customer support account on Twitter received a large number of messages from people complaining about their Spotify Wrapped results, believing them to be wrong or unfair.

In December 2019, more than 1,200,000 posts on Twitter were about Spotify Wrapped after it came out near the beginning of the month.

=== In media ===
In The Guardian, a 2019 article stated that the popularity of the Spotify Wrapped campaign "shows that some people not only accept their data being used and stored but embrace their intimate listening habits being put on public display." Also in 2019, Dan Adler wrote an article in Vanity Fair in which he questioned the effects of Spotify's algorithms and Spotify Wrapped on the music industry, stating that Spotify's playlists are designed using the same data shared in Spotify Wrapped and referring to a 2017 article in The Baffler whose author argued that "Spotify's obsession with mood and activity-based playlists has contributed to all music becoming more like Muzak." Referencing Spotify Wrapped's use of the slogan "no one listened quite like you" and of the vaguely defined genre pop rap, Adler concluded that "maybe it's all pop rap in the end, and no listens quite like you until everyone does."

In 2020, an opinion article by Meredith Clark in NBC Think described Wrapped as "a pretty box full of mined data that we willingly fed into an international corporation's computers in exchange for listening convenience" but stated that Wrapped was comforting because its information about people's listening habits proved "that none of us are really cool". In 2021, Rachel Metz of CNN Business described Spotify Wrapped as an "impressively effective" marketing campaign, noting that it demonstrates "how a company can conduct in-depth surveillance of our personal behavior over a long period of time and package it as a fun feature that we want to share with others." Metz quoted Chris Gilliard of the Shorenstein Center on Media, Politics and Public Policy, who said that Spotify makes Wrapped "viral and appealing" to "occlude the harms of the extractive practices" that enable its creation. She and Gilliard both noted that Spotify Wrapped data can reveal personal information, providing the example that the presence of lullabies or songs by The Wiggles might suggest that a user has a young child.

==== Criticism ====
A 2018 article in The Atlantic described Spotify Wrapped as "a masterful coup of free advertising" and pointed out the volume of personal data that Spotify collects; Spotify declined to comment. In 2020, an article in The Baffler similarly characterized the campaign, cautioning readers that "Wrapped is Spotify's way of obtaining free advertising from all sides of its business model" and arguing that Spotify users should be conscious of the fact that they are advertising "a company whose product is fully built on exploited labor".

A 2021 opinion piece by Amil Niazi in The Globe and Mail framed Spotify Wrapped as "a reminder of Spotify's dominance in the music streaming space" and questioned whether the company's control is "ultimately good for how we consume music". Niazi said that the algorithms of Spotify shape the listening habits of users in a way that "favours big names and heavy streams." Also in 2021, Elle Hunt wrote an opinion piece criticizing Spotify Wrapped in The Guardian, characterizing it as "an effective marketing scheme" but a "banal and depressing" experience. Hunt argued that Spotify users' listening habits are largely shaped by the platform itself, and described Wrapped as "flat, functional, siloed" in contrast to Last.fm. She concluded that Wrapped is "little more than free advertising for a company that even the UK government has condemned for not extending a fair share of its profits and power to artists", and stated that "Wrapped isn't even the most interesting data [Spotify] keeps on you." A 2021 article in Vox by Kelly Pau linked Spotify Wrapped to broader issues such as algorithmic bias, surveillance capitalism, and personal branding, with Pau writing that the campaign allows users to "reveal a little about themselves with low stakes and minimal participation, thoughtlessly mimicking how influencers mine their likes and interests to become a brand."

=== By other services ===
In response to the success of Spotify's Wrapped campaign, several competing music streaming services have introduced similar data compilation features. Apple Music released its "Replay" playlist feature in 2019, accessible throughout the year, then redesigned "Replay" in 2022 to incorporate more interactive elements akin to Wrapped. Tidal launched its "My Rewind" feature in 2020, which is available on the 1st of December every year alongside a curated "Best of" series. Google introduced the "Recap" feature on YouTube Music in 2020, originally named "Your Music Journey", which began releasing seasonally in 2022 and later expanded to other Google services such as Photos in 2024 and YouTube in 2025. Deezer's "#MyDeezerYear" feature was introduced in 2021.

Other online services—including Wikipedia, Steam, and Discord—have introduced similar features in the mid-2020s.

=== By the marketing industry ===
In 2021, Adweek published an article where marketers who had recently been featured in the trade publication were asked about a social media marketing post they considered "best-in-class", the social media directors of McDonald's and PepsiCo as well as a marketing executive at El Pollo Loco all cited the Spotify Wrapped campaign. The McDonald's director called the campaign "a masterclass on fan advocacy".

=== Awards ===
In 2020, the Spotify Wrapped campaign won various Webby Awards including the People's Voice Awards for Music, Best Data Visualization, and Best User Experience as well as the awards for Entertainment, Viral Marketing, and Integrated Campaign.

== See also ==
- How Bad Is Your Spotify? – Internet bot
