= 7th Wish 107.5 Music Awards =

7th annual music awards of Wish 107.5

- Previous: 6th Wish 107.5 Music Awards; January 17, 2021
- Date: January 30, 2022
- Venue: New Frontier Theater
- Country: Philippines
- Hosted by: Gretchen Ho, Xian Lim

Wish 107.5 Music Awards 2022 is the 7th edition of the Wish 107.5 Music Awards, an accolade presented by the FM radio station Wish 107.5 to acknowledge the biggest hit makers of the year in the Philippine music industry. The awards were held at the New Frontier Theater and livestreamed simultaneously at the official YouTube channel of Wish 107.5. The event was hosted by Gretchen Ho and Xian Lim.

However, due to the COVID-19 pandemic in the Philippines, the event was held with safety protocols implemented for the performers, hosts and organizers with a digital livestream on their official YouTube channel.

== Winners and nominees ==
Winners are listed first and highlighted in boldface. Tagalog song titles are provided with English translations, enclosed inside the parenthesis.

Wish Artist of the Year	Wish Group of the Year
**Moira Dela Torre** Beneficiary: Sto. Nino Home for the Aged, Inc.; Arthur Nery; Morissette; Zild	**SB19** Beneficiary: Autism Society Philippines; Ben&Ben; Leanne & Naara; The Juans
Wish Breakthrough Artist of the Year	Wishclusive Pop Performance of the Year
**Zack Tabudlo** Beneficiary: ChildHope Philippines; Adie; Bandang Lapis; BGYO	**SB19 - "Ikako"** Beneficiary: Autism Society Philippines; BGYO - "The Light"; Morissette - "Phoenix"; TJ Monterde – "Inday" (Maid)
Wishclusive Ballad Performance of the Year	Wishclusive R&B Performance of the Year
**SB19 - "Hanggang Sa Muli** (Until Again) Beneficiary: Autism Society Philippines; KZ Tandingan - "Dodong" (Young Man); Lyca Gairanod - "Akala Ko Ba" (I Thought So); The CompanY - "Sumakabilang Puso" (In Two Hearts)	**Jay R - "Hinay" (Slow Down)** Beneficiary: Make-A-Wish Foundation; Darren - "Tama na" (That Is Enough); Elha Nympha - "Do It"; Kyle Echarri - "Panaginip" (Dream)
Wishclusive Rock/Alternative Performance of the Year	Wishclusive Hip-hop Performance of the Year
**The Juans - "Pangalawang Bitaw" (Second Release)** Beneficiary: A Home for the Angels Crisis Home for Abandones Babies Foundation, Inc.; Bandang Lapis - "Kabilang Buhay" (Afterlife); Zack Tabudlo - "Binibini" (Young Lady); Zild - "Kyusi" (Quezon City)	**Ez Mil - "Panalo" (Win)** Beneficiary: Adarna Group Foundation, Inc.; 1096 Gang - "Pajama Party"; MC Einstein (ft. Flow G, Yuri Dope, and Jekkpot) - "Bahala Ka" (It Is Up To You); Smugglaz - "HakunaMatata"
Wishclusive Contemporary R&B Performance of the Year	Wishclusive Contemporary Folk Performance of the Year
**Arthur Nery - "Binhi" (Seed)** Beneficiary: Operation Smile Philippines Foundation, Inc.; James Reid - "Soda"; Leanne & Naara - "Who's Gonna Love You"; Quest - "Tuloy Tuloy" (Keep Going)	**Ben&Ben – "Sa Susunod na Habang Buhay"** (In the Next Life Time) Beneficiary: A Home for the Angels Crisis Home for Abandoned Babies Foundation, Inc.; Adie - "Paraluman"; Janine Tenoso - "Art of Letting Go"; juan karlos - "Boston"
Wishclusive Collaboration of the Year	Wish Pop Song of the Year
**The Juans, Janine Teñoso – "BTNS (Bakit ‘To Nangyari Sa’tin)"** (Why Is This Happening To Us) Beneficiaries: A Home For The Angels Crisis Home For Abandoned Babies Foundation Inc. and Operation Smile Foundation Philippines, Inc.; Imago, Bente Dos – "Partida" (Advantage); Keiko Necesario, EJ De Perio – "Balang Araw" (Someday); Quest, Rita Daniela – "Di Ko Akalain" (I Never Thought)	**SB19 - What?** Beneficiary: Autism Society Philippines; Bini - Born to Win; Belle Mariano - "Sigurado" (For Sure); Morissette - "Trophy"
Wish Ballad Song of the Year	Wish R&B Song of the Year
**The Juans - "Dulo" (End)** Beneficiary: A Home for the Angels Crisis Home for Abandoned Babies Foundation, Inc.; Ebe Dancel - "Mananatili" (Will Stay); Resse Lansangan - "Orbiting"; SUD - "Halong" (Mixed)	**"Arthur Nery - "Take All The Love"** Beneficiary: Child Hope Philippines; Cean Jr. - "YK"; Julie Anne San Jose - "Try Love Again"; Leanne & Naara - "Anticipation"
Wish Rock/Alternative Song of the Year	Wish Hip-hop Song of the Year
**"Zild - "Bugantulog"** Beneficiary: Adarna Group Foundation, Inc.; Bita and The Botfflies - "Guillotine Drops"; Gaaby Alipe - "Fragile and Human"; I Belong To The Zoo -"Wala Lang" (Nothing)	**Flow G (ft. Gloc-9) - "Ibong Adarna" (Adarna Bird)** Beneficiary: Adarna Group Foundation, Inc.; Mike swift D-Coy, Alisson Shore, kiyo and Mark Beats - "Beautiful Day"; Shanti Dope (ft. DJ Buddah) - "Teknik" (Technique); Shockra - "Operation 10-90"
Wish Contemporary R&B Song of the Year	Wish Contemporary Folk Song of the Year
**James Reid - "Hello"** Beneficiary: A Home for the Angels Crisis Home for Abandoned Babies Foundation, Inc.; GIBBS, Moophs - "Angel Baby"; Skusta Clee - "Lagi" (Always); UDD - "Paagi"	**Moira Dela Torre** - **"Paubaya" (Forgiveness)** Beneficiary: Sto. Nino Home for the Aged, Inc.; Angela Ken - "Ako Naman Muna" (Me First); Ben&Ben - "Upuan" (chair); Munimuni - "Maligaya" (Happy)
Wish Song Collaboration of the Year	
**Ben&Ben, Zild, and juan karlos - "Lunod" (Drowned)** Beneficiary: A Home For The Angels Crisis Home For Abandoned Babies Foundation, Inc., Adarna Group Foundation, and Philippine Cancer Society; Arthur Nery and Jason Dhakal - "Happy W U"; Ben&Ben and Munimuni - "Sugat" (Wound); Janine Tenoso and Arthur Nery - "Pelikula" (Movie)	

== Special recognition ==
=== Special awards ===
Award	Artists
Wishers’ Choice Award	SB19
KDR Icon of Music and Philanthropy	Ramon "Chino" Alfonso Soberano
KDR Icon of Musical Excellence	Maestro Louie Ocampo

=== Wishclusive Elite Circle Awardees ===
Award	Artists
Platinum Wishclusive Elite Circle; 75 million views	Gloc-9 (ft. Flow G) "Halik" (Kiss)
Platinum Wishclusive Elite Circle; 75 million views	Morissette - "Against All Odds"
Gold Wishclusive Elite Circle; 50 million views	Bandang Lapis - "Kabilang Buhay" (Afterlife)
Gold Wishclusive Elite Circle; 50 million views	Ez Mil - "Panalo" (Win)
Gold Wishclusive Elite Circle; 50 million views	Gloc-9 (ft. Flow G) - "Halik" (Kiss)
Gold Wishclusive Elite Circle; 50 million views	Regine Velasquez-Alcasid - "Araw-Gabi" (Day and Night)
Silver Wishclusive Elite Circle; 25 million views	Bandang Lapis - "Kabilang Buhay" (Afterlife)
Silver Wishclusive Elite Circle; 25 million views	CLR and Omar Baliw - "K&B"
Silver Wishclusive Elite Circle; 25 million views	Ez Mil - "Panalo" (Win)
Silver Wishclusive Elite Circle; 25 million views	kiyo and Alisson Shore - "Urong; Sulong" (Back and Forth)
Silver Wishclusive Elite Circle; 25 million views	MC Einstein (ft. Flow G, Yuri Dope, and Jekkpot) - "Titig" (Stare)
Silver Wishclusive Elite Circle; 25 million views	Michael Pangilinan - "Rainbow"
Silver Wishclusive Elite Circle; 25 million views	Pricetagg (ft. Gloc-9 and JP Bacallan) - "Pahina" (Page)
Bronze Wishclusive Elite Circle; 10 million views	Bandang Lapis - "Kabilang Buhay" (Afterlife), "Pagsisi" (Repentance)
Bronze Wishclusive Elite Circle; 10 million views	Ez Mil - "Panalo" (WIn)
Bronze Wishclusive Elite Circle; 10 million views	Gigi De Lana - "Pangarap Ko Ang Ibigin Ka" (My Dream Is To Love You)
Bronze Wishclusive Elite Circle; 10 million views	JuanThugs n Harmony - "Bakit Ngayon Ka Lang" (Why Only You Now)
Bronze Wishclusive Elite Circle; 10 million views	MC Einstein (ft. Flow G, Yuri Hope, and Jekkpot) - "Titig" (Stare)
Bronze Wishclusive Elite Circle; 10 million views	Skusta Clee - "Umaasa" (Hoping)
