= TJ Monterde =

Filipino singer and songwriter (born 1989)

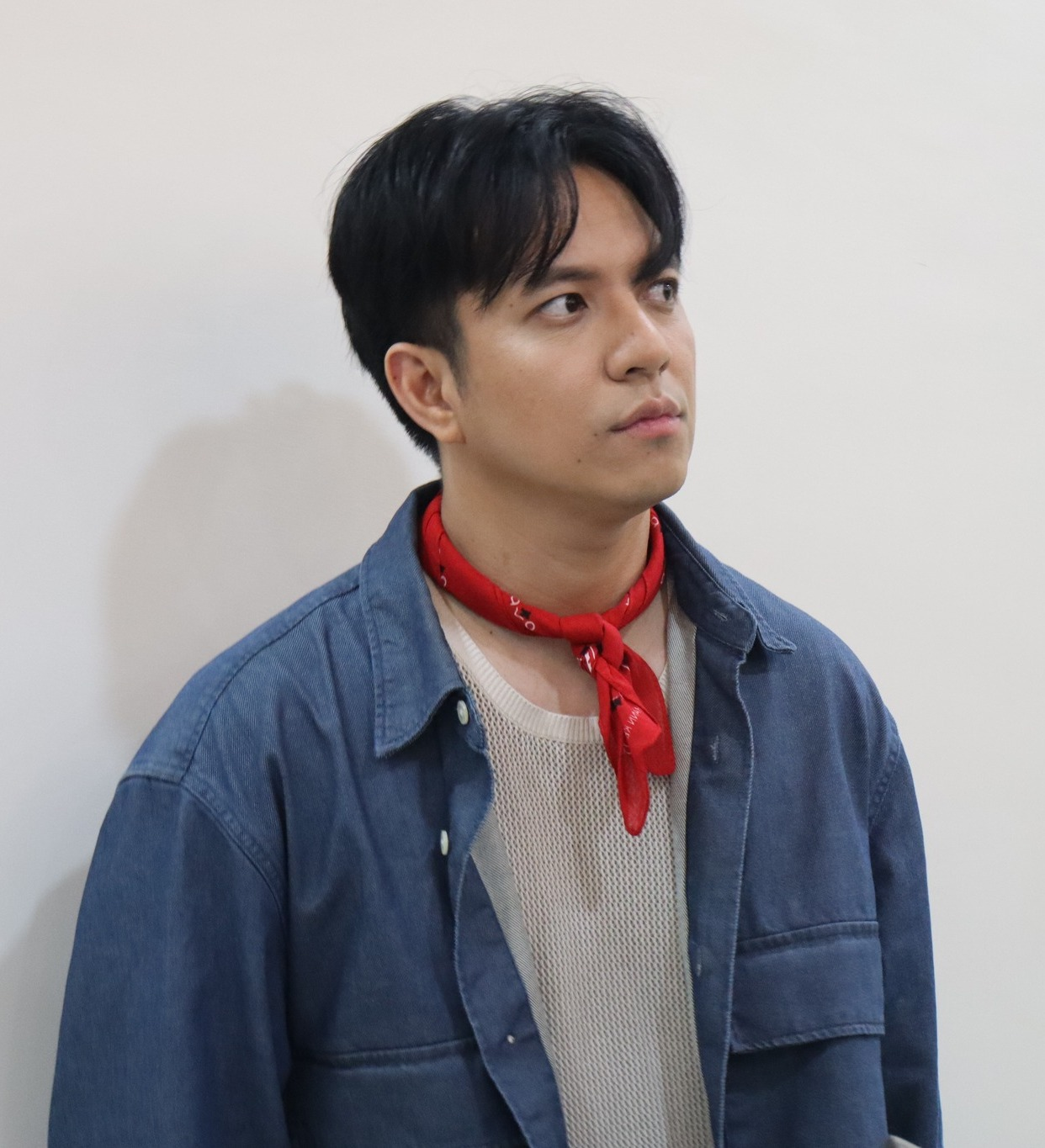
- Monterde in 2025

Background information
- Born: Titus John Dabuan Monterde; December 30, 1989 (age 36); Cagayan de Oro, Philippines
- Genres: Pop; R&B; Visayan pop
- Occupations: Singer; songwriter
- Years active: 2012–present
- Labels: PolyEast Records (2012–2021); Independent (2022–present)
- Spouse: KZ Tandingan (m. 2020)

Titus John Dabuan "TJ" Monterde (born December 30, 1989) is a Filipino singer-songwriter. He gained recognition in 2011 through his viral YouTube videos, where he shared his original compositions, reaching a wide audience and receiving positive feedback online. His song "Ikaw at Ako" became his signature hit and was featured in the YouTube viral short film My Super Fan Girl.

In 2024, Monterde gained mainstream popularity again with his single, "Palagi, which was released back in 2023, and has topped the Billboard Top Philippine Songs and Philippines Hot 100 year-end charts of 2024. He also received an award from Billboard Philippines for his song "Palagi" as the number one song of 2024. He was regarded as the most streamed OPM artist on Spotify.

== Early life and education ==
Monterde began his career at the age of 16 in 2006 as a radio jockey in Cagayan de Oro, initially guesting on his father’s local radio show before moving on to a regular radio slot. By 18, he became a television host for ABS-CBN's regional magazine program MagTV.

He graduated from Xavier University – Ateneo de Cagayan with a degree in Development Communication. By 2010, his profile had grown as a multimedia entertainer, appearing on local television and performing at various events across Mindanao.

== Career ==
=== 2012–2023: Early success ===
In 2012, Monterde uploaded his original composition titled "Ikaw at Ako" on YouTube, and later he signed on Galaxy Records, a subsidiary of PolyEast Records, in which his composition "Ikaw at Ako" released as a debut single. In 2014 and 2016, Monterde released his following singles, "Tulad Mo" and "Dating Tayo", which became one of the top music charts on Myx and Billboard Philippines.

In June 2017, Monterde held his first major concert titled "Ikaw at Ako" at Music Museum in San Juan. Later that month, he released his extended play, titled "Kahit Kunwari", including his single, "Mahika".

In July 2019, he released his single, "Karera" (lit. 'Race'), for his inspiration of his girlfriend, KZ Tandingan. In 2020, "Karera" was nominated at the 33rd Awit Awards and won for Best Performance by a Male Recording Artist.

In May 2020, he released "Puhon" (transl. Someday), a song he wrote in Cebuano. He said that this was a part of his personal advocacy to introduce Visayan pop to the world. Three months later, Monterde and Tandingan married on August 28, and had collaborated two months later with the single, titled "Simula" (lit. 'Beginning').

By late July of 2021, he and his wife, KZ Tandingan, released their Cebuano-language songs, titled "Inday" (lit. 'Girl') and "Dodong" (lit. 'Boy'), respectively. His song, "Inday", was nominated for Wishclusive Pop Performance of the Year at 7th Wish 107.5 Music Awards in 2022. On October, he and South Korean singer, Yelo, collaborated and released their new single, titled "Little Things".

=== 2023–2024: "Palagi", and "Sariling Mundo" solo concert ===
In July 2023, Monterde released "Palagi" (lit. 'Always'), a song dedicated to his wife, KZ Tandingan. In September 2024, "Palagi" peaked at number two on the Billboard Philippines Hot 100 chart, following its debut at number six on July. On October 26, "Palagi" topped the Billboard Top Philippine Songs chart, also debuting at number six.

In April 2024, after the success of his single, "Palagi", Monterde announced his next album, titled "Sariling Mundo" (lit. 'Own World'), and has also announced that he would be holding his solo concert, titled with the same name at New Frontier Theatre at Quezon City in May. Nearly a day after the announcement, the tickets were sold out within 24 hours, and also announced its second day of the concert. The second day also sold out within three hours.

On August 27, Monterde announced on Instagram that he is set to re-release his track "Palagi", featuring his wife KZ Tandingan. The following day, the track has released, titled with the same name, adding "TJxKZ Version", to coincide with the couple's fourth wedding anniversary.

In September, Monterde announced that he would be holding his concert at Canada on October and November. The following month, he also announced his solo concert, titled "Sariling Mundo At The Big Dome" in 2025.

=== 2025–present: "Sarili Nating Mundo" concert and further success ===
In January 2025, Monterde shared his disbelief and heartfelt gratitude following the sold-out success of his three-night "Sariling Mundo At The Big Dome" concert at the Araneta Coliseum. Later that month, Monterde would be holding a concert at SMX Convention Center in Davao City on March.

"Sarili Nating Mundo at the Big Dome" had its stops at Dubai, Singapore, Cebu City and Taiwan, and some cities in the Philippines.

In February 3, during Monterde's concert at Araneta Coliseum, Billboard Philippines awarded him and Tandingan for "Palagi" as the number one song of 2024. Later that month, Monterde was regarded as the most streamed OPM artist on Spotify in 2024. On February 17, Aurora Music Festival announced that Monterde would perform in the first day of the music festival's 2025 iteration, which was held on May 3 and May 4 in Clark, Pampanga. At the inauguration of the Official Philippines Chart on February 19, Monterde was recognized as the seventh Local Artist of the Year, while "Palagi" was recognized as the Local Song of the Year.

In March, Dunkin' Donuts announced an endorsement deal with Monterde and Tandingan, and became the brand's ambassadors, forming the title "Ang Palagi".

On May 6, he and South Korean singer, 10cm's Kwon Jung-yeol, collaborated and released two singles, titled "Silver" and "After 3", after performing one of the singles during "Sarili Nating Mundo" concert in February 4. Later that month, Monterde and his wife, Tandingan, hosted their first fan-meet, titled "Never Been Sweeter" at Mall of Asia Arena. Three months later, the couple is set to have another fan meet in Waterfront Cebu City Hotel & Casino at Cebu on November 8.

On June 6, Monterde was featured in James Reid's third album jgh with their country and R&B single "Pahinga" (lit. 'Rest'). At the same month, he announced that he would be holding another day for the Baguio leg of his "Sarili Nating Mundo" concert during his fan meeting due to sold-out tickets on the first day.

Monterde's former label, PolyEast Records announced to release Monterde's music in vinyl record. On July 2, the record label has released the vinyl.

On August 21, Monterde released his single, titled "Unang Halik" (lit. 'First Kiss'), after performing the song as an unreleased track during his kick-off at his "Sarili Nating Mundo At The Big Dome" in Araneta Coliseum.

In October, Monterde and his wife, Tandingan, is set to hold the concert at Araneta Coliseum on February 6-7, 2026, titled "TJ Monterde and KZ Tandingan: In Between Live at the Big Dome", and was sold out just 7 hours after its announcement.

== Personal life ==
Monterde married fellow singer KZ Tandingan on August 28, 2020. The couple married again for the second time on August 28, 2023.

== Discography ==
=== Studio album ===
List of albums, with selected details
Title	Album details
Ikaw At Ako	Released: 2012; Label: PolyEast Records; Formats: Digital download, streaming
Ikaw At Ako (Instrumental version)	Released: 2012; Label: PolyEast Records; Formats: Digital download, streaming
Sariling Mundo	Released: April 25, 2024; Label: Independent; Formats: Digital download, streaming
Sariling Mundo (Live at New Frontier Theater)	Released: August 16, 2024; Label: Independent; Formats: Digital download, streaming
Sarili Nating Mundo (Live at the Big Dome)	Released: May 2, 2025; Label: Independent; Formats: Digital download, streaming

=== Extended plays ===
List of extended plays
Title	Album details
TJ Monterde	Released: June 16, 2016; Label: PolyEast Records; Formats: Digital download, streaming
TJ Monterde (Instrumental version)	Released: June 16, 2016; Label: PolyEast Records; Formats: Digital download, streaming
Kahit Kunwari	Released: June 16, 2017; Label: PolyEast Records; Formats: Digital download, streaming

=== Singles ===
Title	Year	Peak chart positions			Album	Ref.
Title	Year	PHL	PHL Top	PHL Songs	Album	Ref.
"Us"	2014	*	*	*	Unang Sikat (The Next Generation Hitmakers)	
"Us" (with Muriel)	2014	*	*	*	Unang Sikat (The Next Generation Hitmakers)	
"Tulad Mo"	2014	*	*	*	Non-album singles	
"Mahika"	2014	*	*	*	Kahit Kunwari	
"Litrato Ngayong Pasko"	2014	*	*	*	Non-album singles	
"Imahinasyon"	2014	*	*	*	TJ Monterde	
"Litrato Ngayong Pasko (Live)"	2018	*	*	*	Non-album singles	
"Tahanan"	2019	*	*	*	Non-album singles	
"Karera"	2019	*	*	*	Non-album singles	
"Malay Mo"	2019	*	*	*	Non-album singles	
"Hanggang Dito Na Lang"	2020	*	*	*	Non-album singles	
"Puhon"	2020	*	*	*	Non-album singles	
"Dakila Ka, Bayani Ka" (with various artists)	2020	*	*	*	Non-album singles	
"Simula" (with KZ Tandingan)	2020	*	*	*	Non-album singles	
"Inday"	2021	*	*	*	Non-album singles	
"Little Things" (with YELO)	2021	*	*	*	Non-album singles	
"Walong Bilyon"	2022	—	—	—	Non-album singles	
"Walong Bilyon (Wedding Version)"	2022	—	—	—	Non-album singles	
"Sigurado"	2022	—	—	—	Non-album singles	
"Plano"	2023	—	—	—	Sariling Mundo	
"Palagi"	2023	2	1	5	Sariling Mundo	
"Nowhere"	2024	—	—	—	Sariling Mundo	
"Palagi (TJxKZ Version)"	2024	4	1	—	Non-album singles	
"Darating Din"	2024	—	—	—	Non-album singles	
"Silver" (with 10CM)	2025	—	—	—	Non-album singles	
"After 3" (with 10CM)	2025	—	—	—	Non-album singles	
"Pahinga" (with James Reid)	2025	—	—	—	jgh (Deluxe)	
"Unang Halik"	2025	—	—	—	Non-album single	
"—" denotes a single that did not chart. "*" denotes that chart did not exist at the time of the song's release.

=== Other charted songs ===
List of other charted songs, showing selected chart positions, and associated albums
Title	Year	Peak chart positions		Album
Title	Year	PHL	PHL Top	Album
"Ikaw At Ako"	2013	43	19	Ikaw At Ako
"Dating Tayo"	2016	18	8	TJ Monterde
"Mahika"	2017	61	24	Kahit Kunwari

== Concerts ==
- Sariling Mundo
- Sarili Nating Mundo at the Araneta Coliseum
- In Between Live at the Araneta Coliseum

== Awards and nominations ==
Name of the award ceremony, year presented, award category, nominee(s) of the award, and the result of the nomination
Award	Year (Note: Indicates the year of ceremony. Each year is linked to the article about the awards held that year, wherever possible.)	Category	Recipient(s)	Result	Ref.
Awit Awards	2020	Best Performance by a Male Recording Artist	"Karera"	Won	
Awit Awards	2020	Favorite Male Artist	TJ Monterde	Won	
Awit Awards	2021	Best Performance by a Male Recording Artist	"Puhon"	Nominated	
Awit Awards	2021	Best Regional Recording	"Puhon"	Nominated	
Awit Awards	2021	Best Collaboration	"Simula" (with KZ Tandingan)	Nominated	
Awit Awards	2021	Best Ballad Recording	"Simula" (with KZ Tandingan)	Nominated	
6th Wish 107.5 Music Awards	2021	Pop Performance of the Year	"Puhon"	Nominated	
7th Wish 107.5 Music Awards	2022	Wishclusive Pop Performance of the Year	"Inday"	Nominated	
Myx Music Awards 2024	2024	Mellow Video of the Year	"Palagi"	Nominated	
Wish Music Awards	2024	Wish Artist of the Year	TJ Monterde	Nominated	
Wish Music Awards	2024	Wish Pop Song of the Year	"Palagi"	Won	
Wish Music Awards	2025	Wish Artist of the Year	TJ Monterde	Nominated	
Wish Music Awards	2025	Wish Pop Song of the Year	"Sariling Mundo"	Nominated	
VP Choice Awards	2025	OPM Song of the Year	"Palagi (TJxKZ Version)"	Won	
Filipino Music Awards	2025	People's Choice Awards — Artist	TJ Monterde	Nominated	
Filipino Music Awards	2025	Artist of the Year	TJ Monterde	Nominated	
Filipino Music Awards	2025	Tour of the Year	Sarili Nating Mundo: World Tour	Nominated	
Filipino Music Awards	2025	Concert of the Year	Sarili Nating Mundo at The Big Dome	Nominated	
