= The Realest =

The Realest may refer to:

- "The Realest", a song by Mobb Deep from the 1999 album Murda Muzik
- "The Realest", a song by Young Jeezy from the 2006 album Thug Motivation 102: The Inspiration
- "The Realest", a song by Lizzo from the 2015 album Big Grrrl Small World
- "The Realest", a song by Issues from the 2016 album Headspace
- "The Realest", a song by EST Gee from the 2022 album I Never Felt Nun

== See also ==
- Tha Realest (born 1973), American rapper
- Da REAList, 2008 album by Plies
- "Realest", a song by Ez Mil and Eminem
