= Puhon =

Single by TJ Monterde
- Language: Cebuano
- English title: Someday
- Released: May 14, 2020
- Genre: Visayan pop
- Length: 4:00
- Label: PolyEast
- Songwriter: TJ Monterde
- Producer: TJ Monterde

TJ Monterde singles chronology
| "Hanggang Dito Na Lang" (2020) | "Puhon" (2020) | "Dakila Ka, Bayani Ka (with various artists)" (2020) |

Lyric video
- "Puhon" on YouTube

"Puhon" (transl. Someday) is a song recorded by the Filipino singer TJ Monterde. Monterde began writing "Puhon" three years prior to its release; he produced and completed "Puhon" in his bedroom in the middle of enhanced community quarantine. The song is a midtempo Visayan pop track featuring guitars and marimba. Its lyrics, written in Cebuano, are about a man who wishes to be with the woman he loves.

PolyEast Records released it as a non-album digital single on May 14, 2020; it was re-released on July 2, 2025 on vinyl as a track on Monterde's eponymous compilation album. It received acclaim from music critics, with most of them praising the lyrics. "Puhon" was nominated in the Pop Performance of the Year category at the 6th Wish 107.5 Music Awards, as well as Best Performance by a Male Recording Artist at the 34th Awit Awards. Monterde has performed the song at various concerts, including a duet version with Colet Vergara on February 2, 2025.

== Background and release ==
Filipino singer and songwriter TJ Monterde wrote the chorus for "Puhon" in 2017, three years before the track's release. He finished writing the song while staring at a "beautiful" sunset. The song's entire recording process was completed in two weeks during the Philippines' enhanced community quarantine.

Due to his lack of a "proper" studio, Monterde recorded the song in his bedroom, under a blanket, to prevent capturing outside noise. "Puhon" was recorded with a USB microphone. He also surrounded his microphone with multiple pillows to further enhance the acoustics. In an interview with ABS-CBN Showbiz, he shared that he and his collaborators considered "Puhon" to be an "experiment", asking themselves if it was possible to create a "Spotify-quality" track that was recorded from home.

He added that "Puhon" promoted his advocacy of bringing Visayan pop (Vispop) songs to a national scale. In an interview with The Philippine Star, Monterde shared that it was a "habit" and a part of his "vision" to release songs in his native language, Cebuano (Bisaya), every so often. On May 14, 2020, PolyEast Records released "Puhon" as a digital single, along with a lyric video. On July 2, 2025, the song was re-released on vinyl, as a track on Monterde's eponymous compilation album.

== Composition and lyrics ==
"Puhon" is four minutes long. It is a midtempo Vispop song that features "clean" guitars and a marimba accent in the chorus. Monterde wrote and produced the song himself, while Arnie Mendaros provided vocal coaching and back-up vocals. Chino David is credited for "Puhon"'s musical arrangement. Albert Tamayo mixed and mastered the song.

"Puhon"
A 17-second sample of "Puhon", where the chorus can be heard.

Its lyrics are in Cebuano, written from the perspective of a man who wishes to be with the woman he has loved for a long time. In an article published by the Manila Standard, Monterde further explained that no matter how much the narrator tries to forget about this woman, his romantic feelings for her persist. He added that the song is about waiting for "the perfect time". The Cebuano word "puhon" roughly translates to "someday" or "God-willing". Monterde described the word as "very unique", explaining that it had the power to affect Cebuano speakers' outlook.

PEP's Nikko Tuazon observed that Monterde could relate to the word on a personal level, because the COVID-19 pandemic delayed his wedding with his then-fiancée KZ Tandingan. Julienne Loreto of Positively Filipino, an American magazine, observed that the language used in "Puhon" is "fairly deep". The Philippine Star's Jerry Donato likened the song to a poem, adding that its use of the Cebuano language made listening "more pleasurable". Shortly after the song's release, Monterde declined many fans' requests to translate "Puhon" into Filipino or English, explaining that no matter how hard he tried, the song's "magic" was lost in the process of translation.

== Reception ==
The song received acclaim from music critics. Jerry Donato of The Philippine Star praised "Puhon" for its catchiness, describing it as a contribution to Vispop that deserved mainstream attention. Rappler included "Puhon" in their "OPM songs that marked and made 2020" listicle, with writer Amanda T. Lago praising the song for giving Filipino listeners a "much needed spot of kilig" during the COVID-19 pandemic. The Filipino Times' Kristine Erika Agustin said that the song is "heartfelt" and "conveys a sense of hope and optimism". The newspaper included the track in a list of four OPM songs written in Filipino languages other than Tagalog.

By July 2020, the song's lyric video on YouTube had already garnered more than one million views. Positively Filipino's Julienne Loreto believed that this indicated an "appetite" for Vispop. The Philippine Daily Inquirer's Allan Policarpio also reported that it had also accumulated more than a million streams on Spotify by July. Monterde said it was "encouraging" to see even non-speakers of Cebuano enjoy the song. The song was nominated for Pop Performance of the Year at the 6th Wish 107.5 Music Awards, as well as Best Performance by a Male Recording Artist at the 34th Awit Awards. In 2024, Isulat et al. included "Puhon" in a research paper that examines how Vispop songs reflect Filipino culture. They explained that "Puhon" shows the value of hope.

== Live performances ==
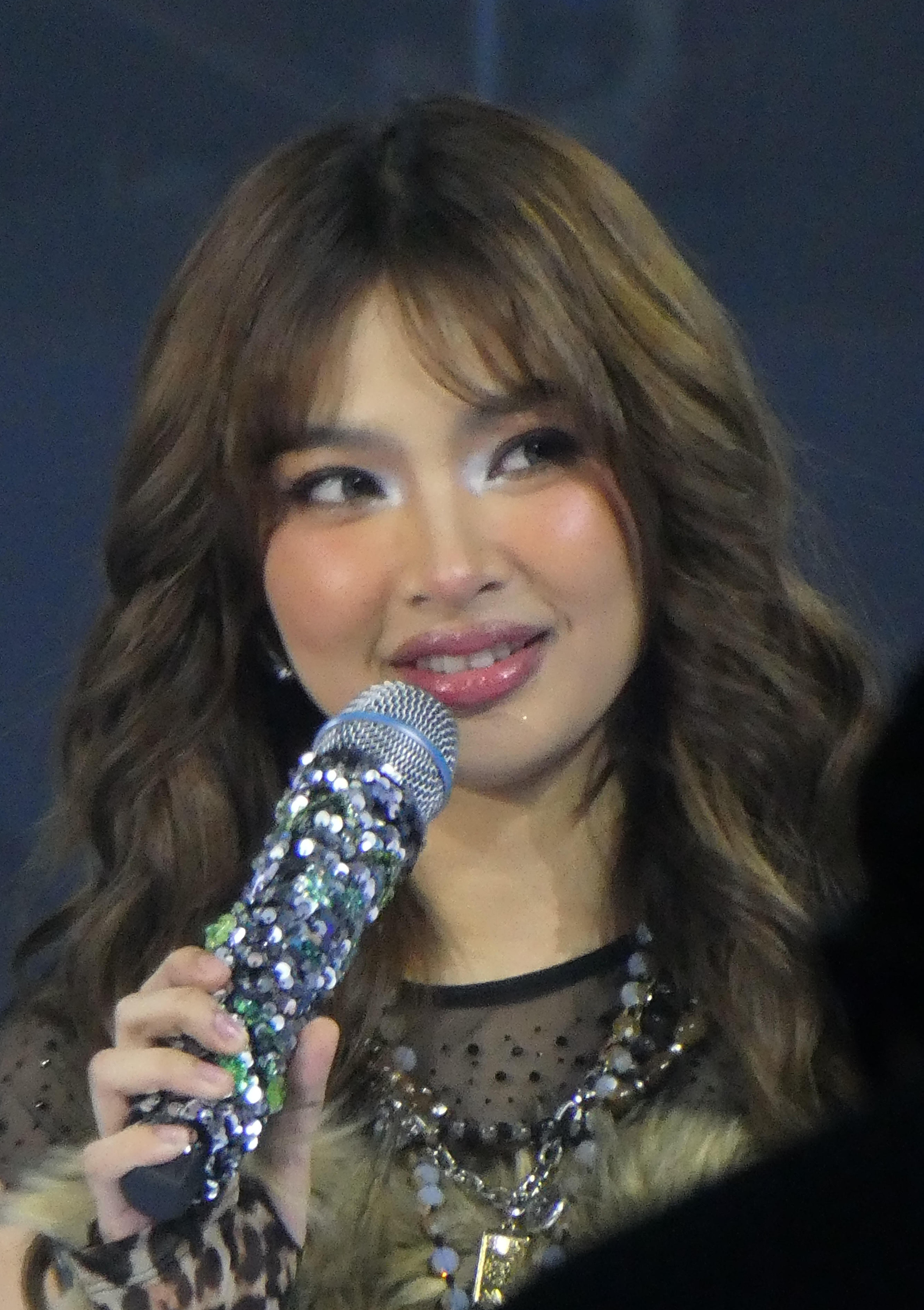
Colet Vergara performed a duet version of "Puhon" at the Sarili Nating Mundo concert

"Puhon" was one of the songs that Monterde performed at his 2024 concert, Sariling Mundo (transl. Own World). The concert took place on May 5 and 6, at the New Frontier Theater in Quezon City. Onstage, he recounted the origin of "Puhon", relating the song to his anxieties about holding a concert. On February 2, 2025, he performed "Puhon" as a duet with surprise guest Colet Vergara of Bini on the second day of his three-night Sarili Nating Mundo (transl. Our Own World) concert, staged at the Araneta Coliseum. The screen behind the two displayed the song's Cebuano lyrics as they sang, paired with Tagalog subtitles.

== Personnel ==
Credits are adapted from Apple Music and a Manila Standard article.

- TJ Monterde – lead vocals, lyrics, production
- Chino David – musical arrangement
- Arnie Mendaros – vocal coaching, back-up vocals
- Albert Tamayo – mixing and mastering

== Awards and nominations ==
| Award | Year | Category | Result | Ref. |
|---|---|---|---|---|
| 6th Wish 107.5 Music Awards | 2021 | Pop Performance of the Year | Nominated | |
| 34th Awit Awards | 2021 | Best Performance by a Male Recording Artist | Nominated | |

=== Listicles ===
| Publisher | Year | Listicle | Placement | Ref. |
|---|---|---|---|---|
| Rappler | 2020 | The OPM songs that marked and made 2020 | Placed | |
| The Filipino Times | 2024 | OPM hits beyond Tagalog? Listen to these songs in various Philippine languages | Placed | |
