= Slim Shady (disambiguation) =

Slim Shady is an alter ego of American rapper Eminem.

Slim Shady may also refer to:

- Slim Shady EP, Eminem's 1997 EP
- The Slim Shady LP, Eminem's 1999 album
- "The Real Slim Shady", the lead single from Eminem's 2000 album The Marshall Mathers LP
- "The Black Slim Shady", a 2022 diss track by the Game aimed at Eminem
- The Death of Slim Shady (Coup de Grâce), Eminem's 2024 album
