= Panalo =

Single by Ez Mil

from the album Act 1
- Language: Tagalog; English; Ilocano
- Released: July 26, 2020
- Length: 3:37
- Label: FFP Records
- Songwriter: Ezekiel Miller

Ez Mil singles chronology
"Easy-Going Millions" (2020)	"Panalo" (2020)	"IDK" (2020)

Performance
- "Panalo" at Wish 107.5's YouTube Channel

"Panalo" (transl. "Victory") is a song by Filipino-American rapper Ez Mil, released on July 26, 2020, as the fifth track on the album Act 1. It features lines in three languages: Filipino/Tagalog, English, and Ilocano in the original Wish 107.5 recording with an addition of Cebuano for the following Pacquiao Version official music video release.

The song became viral after Wish 107.5 uploaded a performance of "Panalo" by Ez Mil on January 29, 2021, to YouTube, which garnered at least 30 million views by early February 2021. "Panalo" was also met with criticism for its erroneous line describing Visayan pre-colonial era leader Lapu-Lapu as having been beheaded in the Battle of Mactan of 1521. In recorded history, the Visayan and his forces prevailed over the Spanish led by Portuguese explorer Ferdinand Magellan. Lapu-Lapu is widely regarded as a national hero in contemporary Philippine society.

== Background ==
Ez Mil wrote "Panalo" as a means to express Filipino pride citing his desire for unity among Filipinos and for "negative" sentiments to be stopped. He also decided to incorporate cariñosa music after his mother suggested to include music samples to the song. The suggestion led Ez Mil to look into Filipino traditional music, with his mother proposing to him to include tinikling music. Ez Mil settled for cariñosa since he learned the associated dance in his high school years. Ez Mil also used artistic license by including a line that mentions "Lapu-Lapu's beheading in Mactan", despite no historical records of the Visayan chieftain's death in the 1521 Battle of Mactan, as a means to generate buzz with his song.

== Reception ==
"Panalo" was released in July 2020 with relatively little reception until the performance of the song was uploaded to YouTube on January 29, 2021. The performance was uploaded as a video under the title "Ez Mil performs ‘Panalo’ LIVE on the Wish USA Bus" on Wish 107.5's YouTube channel. The YouTube video garnered at least 30 million views by February 9, 2021.

Following the "Panalo" performance video becoming viral in early 2021, the song was also met with criticism, particularly for depicting a historically inaccurate account of Lapu-Lapu's beheading.

"Nanalo na ako nung una pa na pinugutan si Lapu sa Mactan. At lahat ang nasaktan na nalaman nila na pinatay ang kanilang bayani sa karagatan ng bansa na pag-aari ng Pilipino."

transl. I already won from the moment Lapu was beheaded in Mactan. And all were hurt when they learned that their hero was killed in the waters of the nation owned by the Filipino.

— The contentious line from "Panalo" about Lapu-Lapu's beheading.

The city council of Lapu-Lapu proposed a resolution condemning the lyrics of "Panalo" which it viewed as "historically inaccurate, if not demeaning to our National Hero". The proposed resolution also sought to urge for the rectification of the song's lyrics and for Ez Mil to publicly apologize to the city's residents. Initially, Lapu-Lapu City Mayor Junard Chan wanted Ez Mil to be declared as persona non grata but withdrew such plans and proposed the city council to pass the resolution urging the rapper to revise his song's lyrics instead.

Ez Mil apologized to those who felt offended by the song by him putting "inaccurate sources" from Philippine history, but acknowledged that his song "got people talking" due to the contentious line. He also said that he would not be revising the lyrics of the song since it would "ruin the integrity of the recording".

The National Historical Commission of the Philippines issued a statement that while it welcomes new songs that inform people on Philippine history, that songs must be made without "compromising history" and emphasizes the fact that "Lapu-Lapu was definitely not killed in the Battle of Mactan" and characterized the battle as a victory of the ancestors of Filipinos led by him.

== Awards and nominations ==
Year	Award	Category	Result	Ref.
2022	Wish 107.5 Music Awards	Wishclusive Hip-hop Performance of the Year	Won	
2022	Wish 107.5 Music Awards	Gold Wishclusive Elite Circle	Awarded	
2022	Wish 107.5 Music Awards	Silver Wishclusive Elite Circle	Awarded	
2022	Wish 107.5 Music Awards	Bronze Wishclusive Elite Circle	Awarded	
