= Realest =

2023 single by Ez Mil and Eminem

Single by Ez Mil and Eminem

from the album DU4LI7Y: REDUX
- Released: August 4, 2023
- Recorded: July 2023
- Genre: Hip hop
- Length: 3:37
- Label: FFP; Shady; Aftermath; Interscope
- Songwriters: Ezekiel Miller; Marshall Mathers; Luis Resto
- Producers: Ez Mil; Eminem

Ez Mil singles chronology
"Up Down (Step & Walk)" (2022)	"Realest" (2023)

Eminem singles chronology
"Is This Love ('09) (Italy only); From the D 2 the LBC" (2022)	"Realest" (2023)	"Lace It" (2023)

"Realest" is a song by Filipino-American rapper Ez Mil and American rapper Eminem. It was released by FFP Records, Shady Records, Aftermath Entertainment, and Interscope Records on August 4, 2023. It serves as the lead single to the deluxe edition of Ez Mil's 2022 studio album DU4LI7Y. The song's official lyric video was released to YouTube on August 11, 2023.

== Background ==
"Realest" marks Ez Mil's major-label debut single and his first collaboration with Eminem. He was signed by Eminem and Dr. Dre to Shady, Aftermath, and Interscope in July 2023, making him the first artist to get signed to all three labels since Stat Quo.

According to Miller, he had already made the beat, the first verse, and the hook before knowing that he would be meeting Eminem and Dr. Dre. When he showed it to them, they were impressed, and Eminem offered to be on the song.

== Composition ==
Trent Fitzgerald of XXL wrote that the song featured "a fist-thumping lunchroom table beat" and a "popping snare", with the two artists rapping using a variety of flows.

Eminem's verse contains several disses toward musicians who have spoken negatively about him in the past, including Melle Mel of Grandmaster Flash and the Furious Five and the Game, while also taking jabs at Gen Z. The Game had previously dissed Eminem on the song "The Black Slim Shady" from his 2022 album, Drillmatic – Heart vs. Mind. Melle Mel responded to Eminem with a short diss track on August 8, 2023, which was panned by critics online. He later deleted the diss track from his social media and released an apology to Eminem.

== Charts ==
Chart performance
Chart (2023)	Peak position
Canada Hot 100 (Billboard)	95
New Zealand Hot Singles (RMNZ)	3
UK Singles Downloads (OCC)	27
US Bubbling Under Hot 100 (Billboard)	25
