= The Black Slim Shady =

2022 diss track by the Game

Song by the Game

from the album Drillmatic – Heart vs. Mind
- Released: August 12, 2022
- Genre: Hip-hop
- Length: 10:25
- Label: 100 Entertainment; Numinati
- Songwriter: Jayceon Terrell Taylor
- Producers: Hit-Boy; Big Duke; Brian King Joseph

"The Black Slim Shady" is a diss track by American rapper the Game aimed at fellow American rapper Eminem. Produced by Hit-Boy, Big Duke, and Brian King Joseph, it was released on August 12, 2022, as part of the Game's tenth studio album, Drillmatic – Heart vs. Mind.

The Game and Eminem's history dates to the 2000s, when they were both members of Aftermath Entertainment. Although the Game departed from the label in 2005 due to feuding with 50 Cent—a fellow Aftermath artist with close ties to Eminem—he spoke positively about Eminem as late as 2021. Tensions began in February 2022, when Aftermath founder Dr. Dre headlined the Super Bowl LVI halftime show in Los Angeles, featuring several current and former Aftermath artists, including Eminem and 50 Cent, but excluding the Game, a Los Angeles native. Starting in March and continuing over several months, the Game challenged Eminem at various podcast appearances and interviews, proclaiming himself the better rapper and teasing "The Black Slim Shady", which he finally released on August 12. After the song's release, he said that he had no personal issues with Eminem and spoke highly of his music. Regarding his reasons for dissing him, the Game said that he did it as a challenge because, in his view, nobody challenges Eminem, and he also cited his frustration with being excluded from the halftime show as a factor.

Throughout the song, which is ten minutes long, the Game mimics Eminem's lyrics, flows, and vocal inflections and performs in the style of his alter ego, Slim Shady. As such, some publications have described it as both a diss track and an homage or parody. The song contains a multitude of disses, ranging from disparaging comments about Eminem's music and career to accusations of cultural appropriation and references to his personal life and family. It received mixed reviews and charted at number five on the New Zealand Hot Singles Chart. Pat Stay, a battle rapper, criticized the song and released his own diss track aimed at the Game, titled "Warm Up", in September 2022. Eminem himself responded to the Game with a few lines on the song "Realest" in August 2023.

== Background and release ==
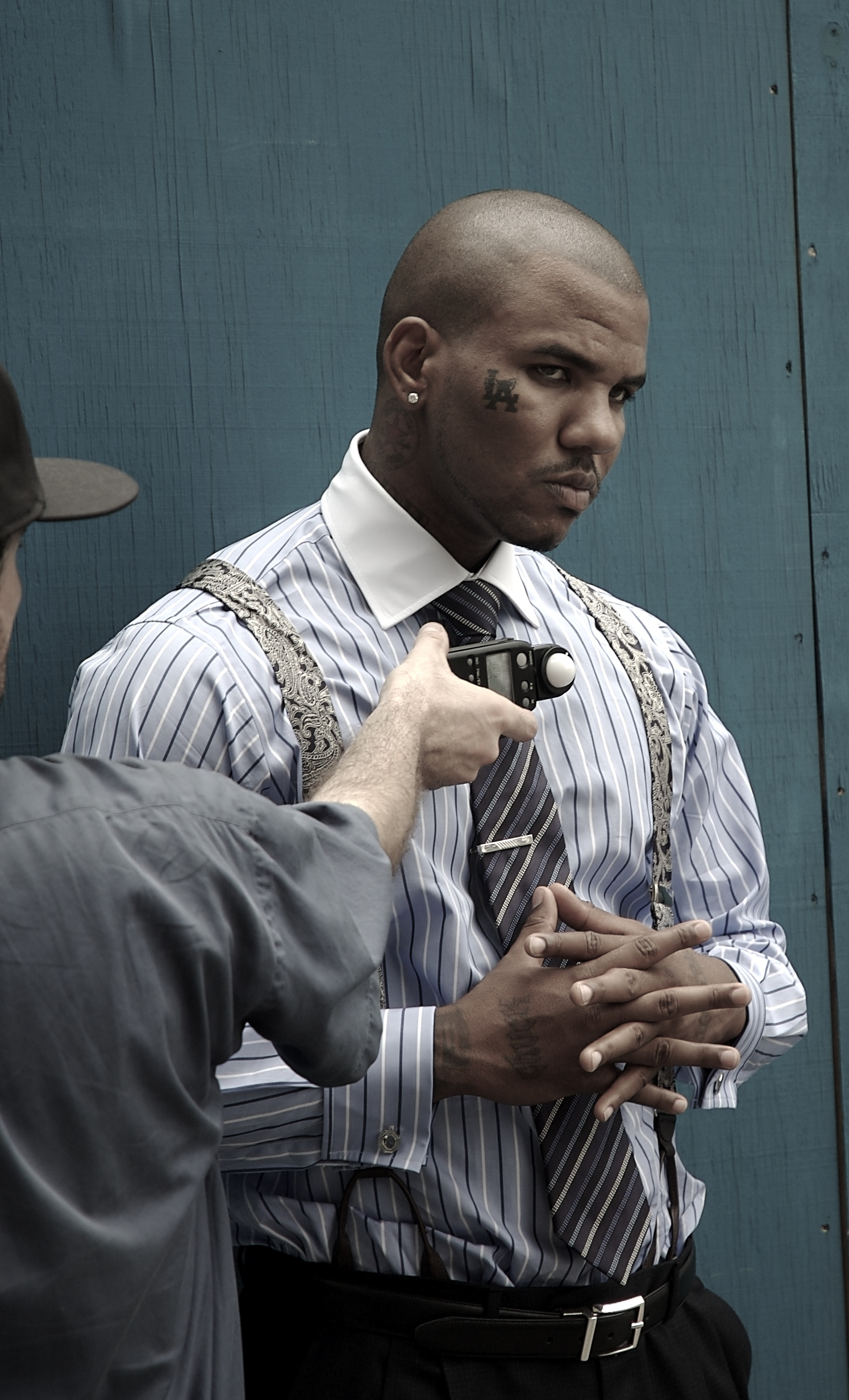
The Game in 2006, shortly after his departure from Aftermath

In 2002 or 2003, the Game signed with Dr. Dre's Interscope imprint Aftermath Entertainment, of which Eminem was also a member. The two rappers collaborated on "We Ain't", a song from the Game's debut studio album, The Documentary. The Game also joined G-Unit, a rap group led by fellow Aftermath artist 50 Cent, Eminem's protégé and close friend.

The Game announced that he was departing from Aftermath in 2005 after entering into a feud with 50 Cent, with whom he remained at odds throughout his career. Over the following years, he spoke highly of Eminem, praising his rapping skills in a 2010 interview and including him in his top ten rappers of all time in a 2021 tweet.

=== Lead-up to release ===
In February 2022, Dr. Dre headlined the Super Bowl LVI halftime show in Los Angeles. The show featured Eminem, 50 Cent, Kendrick Lamar, Snoop Dogg, Mary J. Blige, and Anderson .Paak, all of whom either had a history of being produced by Dr. Dre or were signed to his labels, Aftermath or Death Row Records. Reacting to the show, the Game shared several Instagram Stories of fans who felt he should have performed, leading to speculation that he was upset about his exclusion. A few days later, he took to Instagram to deny that he was upset, calling it a "great show featuring iconic artists" and a "win for the culture".

In March, the Game appeared on the Drink Champs podcast, where he said he was a better and more respected rapper than Eminem, marking the beginning of the feud. He explained that he once thought Eminem was better, but he had since changed his opinion and challenged him to a Verzuz battle. In April, the Game's manager, Wack 100, revealed that the Game had prepared a diss track against Eminem, saying: "We startin' a fire, the Black Slim Shady is coming." Although he implied that it was friendly competition, he cautioned that a back-and-forth between the two would be "disrespectful". In May, the Game said he never heard Eminem's music played "in a club", "in a locker room", or "in the streets". In June, he said that he felt hurt by Dr. Dre not inviting him to perform at the Super Bowl, expressing disappointment that he, a Compton native, was excluded from the Los Angeles show, while Eminem and 50 Cent, who are not from Los Angeles, were included. Days before releasing his album Drillmatic – Heart vs. Mind, he left the comment "Can she rap?" under a Facebook post that showed pictures of Eminem's daughter Hailie Jade.

"The Black Slim Shady" was included on Drillmatic – Heart vs. Mind, which was released on August 12 through 100 Entertainment and Numinati. The song charted on the New Zealand Hot Singles Chart, peaking at number five.

=== Post-release ===
In September, on the Rap Radar podcast, the Game said he had no personal issues with Eminem and that he always liked him, comparing his positive reaction when he first heard "My Name Is" to the first time he heard "Juicy" by the Notorious B.I.G. He explained that his first reason for dissing Eminem was "because nobody really does", and that he did it as a challenge. Additionally, after mentioning how he perceived Eminem as siding with 50 Cent during their feud, he explained that his feelings about the Super Bowl also played a role in the diss:

... I just felt like I had some emotions, a little bit, about Super Bowl shit and all of that. And that's Dre's boy, and Dre don't rap. So it's like, if I wanna have a conversation with Dre or I'm mad at Dre, let me poke shots at Eminem. And 50 can't out-rap me, he's doing his TV thing and more power to him, the shows are great. But as far as rap shit, I got that locked, so the only person I could rap with, or try to poke the bear and see if he really want to go there, is Em.

== Composition ==
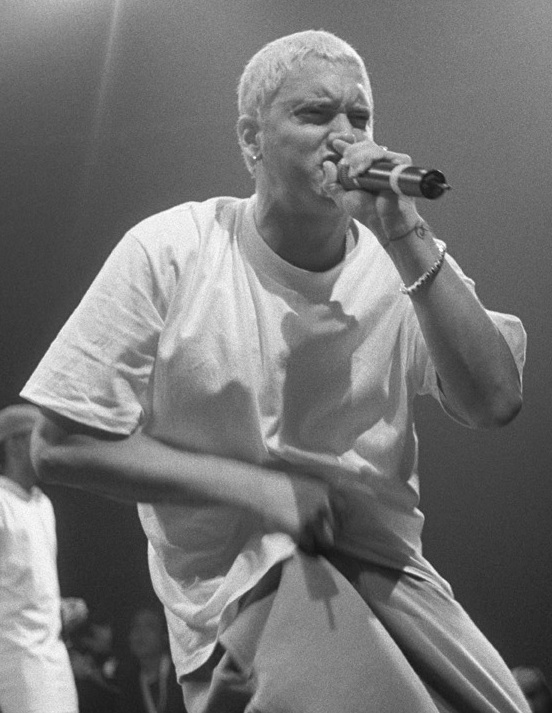
Eminem in 1999, the year he released his Aftermath debut, The Slim Shady LP

A ten-minute diss track, "The Black Slim Shady" was written by the Game, with production handled by Hit-Boy, Big Duke, and Brian King Joseph. It consists of two sections, with the first featuring a "West Coast–inspired boom-bap beat" similar to those used by Eminem during his initial rise in popularity. Its title, "The Black Slim Shady", is a reference to Eminem's 2000 single "The Real Slim Shady". Throughout the song, the Game emulates various lyrical styles, flows, and vocal inflections associated with Eminem, also rapping in the "deranged" style of his alter ego, Slim Shady. He aims his disses primarily towards Eminem, with some lyrics also directed towards Dr. Dre, 50 Cent, and Interscope founder Jimmy Iovine. Writing for HotNewHipHop, Gabriel Bras Nevares said that the song "could also be seen as an homage to Eminem's style and artistic identity", albeit one that is "contextualized more as a roast of Marshall Mathers rather than a tribute". Stereogum's Tom Breihan called it a "full-on Eminem parody".

=== Lyrical content ===
The song begins with a skit in which an Uber driver heads to his last pickup of the day, near 8 Mile Road, where he picks up the Game. Eminem, who grew up in Detroit, is known for his ties to the area, having also starred in the 2002 film 8 Mile. As the song progresses, the Uber driver is identified as Matthew, the brother of Stan, the obsessive fan from Eminem's 2000 single "Stan". Drawing on Eminem's horrorcore influences, the Game kidnaps Matthew and forces him to drive to Eminem's house before killing him. In the chorus, he interpolates Eminem's 1999 single "My Name Is", rapping, "Hi, I'm the Black Slim Shady". At other parts of the song, he raps about killing Dr. Dre in his basement—a reference to "The Real Slim Shady", where Eminem does the same, though in a lighthearted tone—and also interpolates Eminem's "Lose Yourself" flow.

The Game makes several disses concerning Eminem's career. He accuses him of cultural appropriation and downplays his contributions to hip-hop culture; opines that Jay-Z outperformed him on their 2001 collaboration, "Renegade"; claims that Big Sean, not Eminem, is the "biggest rapper in Detroit"; suggests that Eminem should let 50 Cent write his raps for him or accuses him of already doing so; and reiterates how he never hears his music in the clubs, while also rapping about how, out of eleven Eminem albums, he has only played one in his car.

The Game also raps about Eminem's personal life, referencing his past drug addiction, his parents, and his daughter Hailie, who he raps about kidnapping. After several lines targeting Eminem's character and artistic ability, the Game closes out the song with a "taunting" outro challenging him to reply: "Mr. Shady, don't be shady / Pick that pen up, don't be lazy / Call up Dre and get that Dre beat / Jump off stage if shit get crazy."

== Critical reception ==
"The Black Slim Shady" received mixed reviews. In his breakdown of the song, HotNewHipHop's Gabriel Bras Nevares was positive, describing it as "one of the most believable and well-crafted attempted takedowns of Eminem's career from a purely lyrical stance". Pitchfork's Matthew Ismael Ruiz was more negative, referring to the Game's imitation of Slim Shady as "desperate", characterizing lyrics such as "I stick my dick in your podcast" and "Wipe down my stripper pole with the hair grease from your bandana" as "smooth-brained", and adding:

The Game's reverence for Eminem is well-documented, so his claim that he's only ever played one of his records in his car rings hollow. There's a sad sweetness to his obsession, the kind of admiration that can only be felt by a die-hard fan.

Writing for RapReviews, Grant Jones said that the song's title is "itself a compliment to Em" and "highlights just how little this diss makes its mark". He described the Game's nostalgia for his time at Aftermath as "worrying", given that he only released one album under the label, and also called his Slim Shady impersonation "strange". Jones further remarked that Eminem need not respond, calling it a shame as "there's plenty of material to really attack Eminem ... so this feels like a missed opportunity to light a fire under the Detroit wordsmith."

== Response ==
=== By Pat Stay ===
On August 16, 2022, four days after "The Black Slim Shady" was released, the Canadian battle rapper Pat Stay shared a picture of the Game on Instagram, accompanied by the lyric "Dear Slim, I wrote you, but you still ain't callin'" from Eminem's "Stan". He stated in the caption that although he was a fan of the Game, he found it difficult to see him "desperately" seek Eminem's attention. He criticized the Game for promoting the notion that Eminem owed his success to being white and suggested that since he seemed "very eager to battle ... Specifically a 'white boy'", he should battle him instead. Stay said the Game blocked him in response.

On September 2, Stay released "Warm Up", a diss track aimed at the Game. It features Kaleb Simmonds, interpolates Eminem's "Stan", and was released with an accompanying music video. Two days later, on September 4, Stay died after being stabbed in Halifax, Nova Scotia. Both Eminem and the Game shared their condolences online.

=== By Eminem ===
On August 4, 2023, Shady Records, Aftermath, and Interscope signee Ez Mil released "Realest" featuring Eminem. In his verse, in addition to responding to other rappers who have dissed him, Eminem addresses the Game's comments about his music not being played in the clubs, rapping:

All the envious rappers I'd torch if I'm on a joint with 'em
And that is the only retort is I'm not played in the clubs muthafucka put a cork in it
Only reason they still play your shit in the clubs (Why?) is 'cause you still perform in 'em

== See also ==
- Public image of Eminem § Feuds
- List of diss tracks
