= Drillmatic – Heart vs. Mind =

Studio album by The Game
- Released: August 12, 2022
- Genre: Hip-hop
- Length: 159:10
- Labels: 100; Numinati; Virgin
- Producers: Angel Fernandez; Big Duke; Cash Jones; DaVaughn; Derek Kastal; Brian K. Joseph; BongoByTheWay; Guitarboy; Iano; Mike Dean; MJ; MTK; Nigel Rivers; The Kii; Timbaland; Titus E. Johnson; Tobias Wincorn; TWhy Xclusive; London on da Track; Mike Zombie; DJ Paul; DJ Mustard; OG Parker; Shawn Charles; Shaun Martin; Shon' Pierre; Skywalker OG; S1; Swizz Beatz; G. Ry; Hit-Boy

The Game chronology
Born 2 Rap (2019)	Drillmatic – Heart vs. Mind (2022)	The Documentary III (2026)

Singles from Drillmatic – Heart vs. Mind
- 1. "Eazy" Released: January 16, 2022; 2. "Stupid" Released: August 19, 2022

Drillmatic – Heart vs. Mind (or simply Drillmatic) is the tenth studio album by American rapper the Game, released on August 12, 2022, by 100 Entertainment and Virgin Music Label & Artist Services (now Virgin Music). It consists of features from Kanye West, Big Sean, Drake, among others. Across its other 30 tracks, production was done by high-profile producers, such as Timbaland, Swizz Beatz, Mike Dean and Hit-Boy, among others.

The album was supported by two singles, "Eazy" with Kanye West and "Stupid" with Big Sean. The album includes the tracks "Eazy" and "The Black Slim Shady", which are diss tracks aimed at comedian Pete Davidson and fellow rapper Eminem, respectively. The album also includes the song "World Tours" featuring Nipsey Hussle, although it remains unplayable on streaming services.

== Background ==
The Game said on his social media profiles that Drillmatic would make listeners "understand" why he is "the best rapper alive", also writing that "This album has a strong hold on being the best album of my career". He had earlier said that part of the reason for the delay, along with sample clearances, was "disloyalty on levels unimaginable by people I've trusted with my heart, money, career & livelihood".

On January 15, 2022, the first single "Eazy" was released exclusively on Spotify before being added to other streaming platforms a day later, and was also released as the first single on West's album Donda 2. Drillmatic was initially scheduled for release on July 8, 2022, but was delayed.

== Critical reception ==
Professional ratings
Aggregate scores
Source	Rating
Metacritic	59/100
Review scores
Source	Rating
AllMusic	2.5/5 stars
HipHopDX	3.6/5
Pitchfork	5.7/10
Slant Magazine	2.5/5 stars
Medium	8/10
HotNewHipHop	82%

Drillmatic – Heart vs. Mind received mixed reviews from music critics. At Metacritic, which assigns a weighted mean rating out of 100 to reviews from mainstream critics, the album received an average score of 59, based on 5 reviews, which indicates "mixed or average reviews".

Matthew Ruiz of Pitchfork gave the album a 5.7 out of 10 rating, with him describing the album as "exhausting" due to its length and "frustrating" due to The Game's interpretations and references to other styles of hip-hop and older artists, acquainting them to Easter eggs rather than tributes or paying respect.

== Commercial performance ==
In the United States, Drillmatic – Heart vs. Mind debuted at number twelve on the Billboard 200 chart and number eight on the US Top R&B/Hip-Hop Albums, opening with 25,000 album-equivalent units, marking The Game's eighteenth charting album in the country.

== Track listing ==
Drillmatic – Heart vs. Mind track listing
No.	Title	Writer(s)	Producer(s)	Length
1.	"One Time" (featuring Ice-T)	Jayceon Taylor; Tracy Mallow	Angel Fernandez; Big Duke; Davaughn	2:27
2.	"Eazy" (with Kanye West)	Taylor; Kanye West; Chauncey Hollis, Jr.; Michael Dean	Hit-Boy; Mike Dean; Cash Jones; Big Duke	3:53
3.	"Burnin' Checks" (featuring Fivio Foreign)	Taylor; Maxie Ryles	Davaughn	4:50
4.	"Voodoo" (featuring BOA QG)	Taylor	Big Duke	3:27
5.	"Home Invasion"	Taylor	Big Duke	3:29
6.	"O.P.P."	Taylor; Paul Beauregard	DJ Paul; TWhy Xclusive	3:23
7.	"Outside" (featuring YG, Osbe Chill, and The Mass)	Taylor; Keenon Jackson	S1; Shaun Martin; Nigel Rivers	3:07
8.	"La La Land"	Taylor; Beauregard	DJ Paul	4:01
9.	"Change the Game" (featuring Ty Dolla Sign)	Taylor; Tyrone Griffin, Jr.; Hollis, Jr.; Warren Griffin III	Hit-Boy	2:36
10.	"How Far I Came" (featuring Roddy Ricch)	Taylor; Rodrick Moore, Jr.; Hollis Jr.	Hit-Boy	3:23
11.	"Heart vs. Mind"	Taylor; Dijon McFarlane	Mustard	4:27
12.	"No Smoke at the Polo Lounge" (featuring Jeremih)	Taylor; Jeremy Felton; Uforo Ebong	BongoByTheWay	3:49
13.	"No Man Falls" (featuring Pusha T and 2 Chainz)	Taylor; Terrence Thornton; Tauheed Epps	Big Duke; Shawn Charles	4:09
14.	"Chrome Slugs & Harmony" (featuring Lil Wayne and G Herbo)	Taylor; Dwayne Carter, Jr.; Herbert Wright III; London Holmes	London on da Track	4:36
15.	"Start from Scratch II"	Taylor; William Coleman	Mike Zombie; Titus E. Johnson; Big Duke	2:58
16.	"What We Not Gon' Do"	Taylor	Davaughn	4:05
17.	"Fortunate" (featuring Kanye West, Dreezy, and Chiller)	Taylor; West; Seandrea Sledge	Timbaland; Tobias Wincorn	3:55
18.	"Rubi's Rose" (featuring Twista, Jeremih, and Candice Pillay)	Taylor; Carl Mitchell; Felton	Big Duke; Guitarboy	4:52
19.	"Drake with the Braids (Interlude)"	Aubrey Graham; Hollis Jr.	Hit-Boy	1:24
20.	"Nikki Beach" (featuring French Montana and Tory Lanez)	Taylor; Karim Kharbouch; Daystar Peterson	MJ; Iano; Shon' Pierre	3:35
21.	"Talk to Me Nice" (featuring Meek Mill, Moneybagg Yo, and Blxst)	Taylor; Robert Williams; DeMario White, Jr.; Matthew Burdette	Big Duke; Skywalker OG	3:45
22.	"Money Cash Clothes" (featuring ASAP Rocky)	Taylor; Rakim Mayers; Kasseem Dean; Coleman	Swizz Beatz; Mike Zombie	4:52
23.	"K.I.L.L.A.S." (featuring Cam'ron)	Taylor; Cameron Giles	Davaughn	3:56
24.	"The Black Slim Shady"	Taylor; Hollis, Jr.	Hit-Boy; Big Duke; Brian King Joseph	10:25
25.	"Stupid" (featuring Big Sean)	Taylor; Sean Anderson; Hollis, Jr.	Hit-Boy	2:39
26.	".38 Special" (featuring Blueface)	Taylor; Johnathan Porter	Timbaland; Derek Kastal; MTK	2:17
27.	"Twisted"	Taylor	Big Duke; The Kii	3:26
28.	"World Tours" (featuring Nipsey Hussle)	Taylor; Ermias Asghedom	Bennywond3r; Titus E. Johnson	4:06
29.	"Save the Best for Last" (featuring Rick Ross)	Taylor; William Roberts II	G. Ry; OG Parker	3:50
30.	"A Father's Prayer"	Taylor; Hollis, Jr.	Hit-Boy	3:00
31.	"Universal Love" (featuring Chris Brown, Chlöe, and Cassie)	Taylor; Christopher Brown; Chloe Bailey; Cassie Ventura	Davaughn; Titus E. Johnson	4:28
Total length:				159:10

=== Notes ===
- "Drake with the Braids (Interlude)" features vocals by Drake.
- "O.P.P." originally features vocals by YoungBoy Never Broke Again; his verse was removed from the album a week after its release due to YoungBoy's clearance issues.
- "World Tours" was removed from the album after its release.
- Initial track listing features "Wasteman", but it was not released.

=== Sample credits ===
- "La La Land" contains a sample of "Friday" as performed by Ice Cube.
- "Change the Game" contains a sample from its song of the same name as performed by Jay-Z, Beanie Sigel, and Memphis Bleek.
- "No Man Falls" contains a sample of "Blow Away Breeze" as performed by Marvin Sims.
- "Chrome Slugs & Harmony" contains a sample of "Thuggish Ruggish Bone" as performed by Bone Thugs-n-Harmony.
- "Start from Scratch II" contains a sample of "Get Away" as performed by Mobb Deep.
- "Rubi's Rose" contains samples of "They Don't Know" as performed by Jon B. and "Take Away" as performed by Missy Elliott and Ginuwine.
- "Money Cash Clothes" contains a sample of "Money, Cash, Hoes" as performed by Jay-Z and DMX.
- "Save the Best for Last" contains a sample of "Castles of Sand" as performed by Jermaine Jackson.
- "A Father's Prayer" contains a sample of "Song Cry" as performed by Jay-Z.
- "Universal Love" contains a sample of "Got Til It's Gone" as performed by Janet Jackson, Joni Mitchell, and Q-Tip.
- "Eazy" samples "Eazy-Duz-It" by Eazy-E.

== Charts ==
Chart performance for Drillmatic – Heart vs. Mind
Chart (2022)	Peak position
Australian Albums (ARIA)	72
Australian Hip Hop/R&B Albums (ARIA)	23
Belgian Albums (Ultratop Flanders)	162
Canadian Albums (Billboard)	12
Dutch Albums (Album Top 100)	75
New Zealand Albums (RMNZ)	40
Swiss Albums (Schweizer Hitparade)	58
UK Albums (Official Charts)	61
UK R&B Albums (Official Charts)	5
US Billboard 200	12
US Top R&B/Hip-Hop Albums (Billboard)	8
