= Nakakamiss =

Single by Smugglaz, Curse One, Dello & Flict-G

from the album Walking Distance
- Language: Tagalog
- Released: November 10, 2014
- Recorded: 2014
- Genre: Hip hop; pop rap
- Length: 5:07
- Label: Warner Music Philippines; Vertical Brew Music, Inc.
- Songwriters: Bryan Lao; Christian Earl Valenzuela; Wendell Gatmaitan; Raymond Rivera
- Producer: Jonathan Ong

"Nakakamiss" is a song recorded by Filipino hip-hop artists Smugglaz, Curse One, Dello, and Flict-G. It was written by said artists as well, credited with their real names. The song was produced by Jonathan Ong of Sonic State Audio Editing. The song was released as a single on 10 November 2014 though its lyric video was already uploaded in YouTube several months earlier which was on 29 June 2014.The song eventually became the lead single from Smugglaz's album, Walking Distance (2015).

"Nakakamiss" debuted at number one in the Billboard Philippines' Catalog Charts. Also, the song awarded as the most downloaded song during the 28th Awit Awards making Smugglaz, Curse One, Dello, and Flict-G the most downloaded artists of the same event. The video of their live version of the song recorded from the "Wish Bus" of Wish 107.5 became the first video of the radio station's YouTube page to topped the local trends list of the said video-streaming site.

== Track listing ==
Digital download
No.	Title	Length
1.	"Nakakamiss"	5:07

== Charts performance ==
=== Weekly charts ===
Chart (2017)	Peak position
Philippines (Catalog Charts)	1
