= Ez Mil =

Filipino rapper

- Born: Ezekiel Miller Sapiera; July 27, 1998 (age 28); Olongapo, Philippines
- Genre: Hip-hop
- Occupations: Rapper; singer; songwriter; producer
- Years active: 2012–present
- Labels: Shady; Aftermath; Interscope; FFP; Virgin
- Website: www.ezmil.com

Ezekiel Miller Sapiera (born July 27, 1998), known by his stage name Ez Mil (/ˌiːzi ˈmɪl/ EE-zee MIL) (stylized in all caps as "EZ MIL"), is a Filipino rapper, singer and songwriter. He rose to prominence after his song "Panalo" gained public attention. He rose to international prominence in 2023 following his collaboration with Eminem, "Realest". At age 25, he became the first Filipino artist (and the third rapper after 50 Cent and Stat Quo) to have a direct joint deal with Shady Records, Aftermath Entertainment, and Interscope Records.

== Early life ==
Ezekiel Miller was born in Olongapo to a musician father, Paul Sapiera of the band RockStar whose hits in the early '90s include "Mahal Pa Rin Kita" (English translation: "I Still Love You") and "Parting Time", and to a mother who is also active in the music industry. He also grew up with a younger sister, Raynn formerly known as Raining Sorrow.

Miller grew up in Urdaneta, Pangasinan and Olongapo where he was bullied for being tisoy. At a young age he was exposed to different genres of music such as rock, hip-hop, and R&B, and learned to produce and record his own music. He then started his own YouTube channel where he uploaded deathcore covers and deathcore guitar tutorials under the name Slashmouth. He studied architecture at Saint Louis University in Baguio before dropping out after a year and a half and moving to the United States. At first he lived in Seattle, then Los Angeles, before settling down in Las Vegas.

== Career ==
=== 2017–2020: Beginnings, Act I and Resonances ===
Once Miller moved to the United States, he decided to take music seriously. At first he wanted to continue making heavy metal and deathcore. He then decided to transition to rap. He recorded his music in his bedroom alongside his sister and shot his own music videos. During this time, he also worked at Burger King.

In 2020, Miller released his first album, Act I and Resonances, an EP. Act I contains the singles "Panalo", “Easy-Going Millions”, and “Far Away From Home”, while Resonances contains "Into it All". That year, he also participated in the 24 Bars Mark Beats Challenge, created by Filipino DJ Mark Beats. His entry helped him gain a following among Filipinos.

=== 2021–2022: Breakout years, Virgin Music, and DU4LI7Y ===
On January 29, 2021, a video of Miller performing "Panalo" on the Wish Bus USA was uploaded on YouTube. The performance went viral, gaining 10 million views in three days. However, this brought attention to the inaccuracies in the song, which claim that national hero Lapulapu was beheaded. The controversy even reached the point that the mayor of Lapu-Lapu City, Junard Chan, called on him to apologize and change the lyrics. While he has apologized for the lyrics, he has stated that he has no plans to release a different version with more accurate lyrics.

The success of "Panalo" led to more opportunities for Miller. On March 7, Miller made his live TV debut on ASAP Natin 'To alongside 1500 or Nothin'. He then made his first appearance on a US hip-hop radio station when he performed a freestyle about Nipsey Hussle and YG on Power 106. On June 9, 2021, it was announced that Miller had signed with Virgin Music. To celebrate the occasion, a music video for "Panalo" was released featuring boxer Manny Pacquiao.

On April 15, 2022, Miller released his first single of the year, "Dalawampu’t Dalawang Oo". He also returned to the Philippines that year for a nationwide tour, the EZ Mil: Panalo Homecoming Tour. During the tour, he got to perform alongside Gloc-9 at the New Frontier Theater. He also made another appearance on ASAP Natin 'To this time performing with Gigi de Lana, performed "Panalo" with Jeremy G on the season finale of Pinoy Big Brother: Kumunity Season 10, and performed on the Wish Bus, this time with his sister Raynn.

While on tour, Miller released "27 Bodies", a reworking of his entry in the 24 Bars Beats Challenge. On July 27, 2022, he released his second album DU4LI7Y. He then performed in London for the 1MX Filipino music festival. However, he had to cancel the Olongapo stop on his homecoming tour as the tour producer backed out. On September 27, he released a music video for the single "Will You". He closed out the year by performing at halftime of the LA Clippers' Filipino Heritage Night at Crypto Arena.

=== 2023–present: Signing with Eminem and Dr. Dre ===
In February 2023, Miller released the music video for his single "Up Down (Step & Walk)". A month later, Eminem heard the song. Impressed, he reached out to Miller. Initially, Miller thought it was a joke. Once Virgin Records confirmed it was from Eminem, Miller then drove from Vegas to Los Angeles, where he got to meet Eminem and Dr. Dre. On July 27, 2023, it was announced that Miller had signed with Shady Records, Aftermath Entertainment and Interscope Records. At age 25, he became the first Filipino artist and the third rapper (after 50 Cent and Stat Quo) to be signed to all three labels. Also announced was DU4LI7Y: REDUX, the deluxe version of his 2022 LP. This would be the final release of Miller under Virgin Records.

On August 4, 2023, "Realest", a collaboration between Miller and Eminem, was released. It debuted at no. 3 on the on both the Rap Digital Song Sales and R&B/Hip-Hop Digital Song Sales charts. A week later, on August 11, DU4LI7Y: REDUX dropped. A month after the album dropped, he dropped the music video for one of the new singles of the deluxe album "Podium". In November of that year, he partnered with Spotify Stages for a concert at Hudson Square.

In May 2024, Mil was recognized by Forbes 30 Under 30 for his notable contributions and achievements. He also featured on Eminem's album The Death of Slim Shady (Coup de Grâce) on the song "Head Honcho", in which he got to rap part of his verse in Filipino. Billboard called his feature "a coming-out party for EZ Mil". In December, he returned to the Philippines as a featured artist at Akon’s “V1BE Manila” festival.

On October 9th, 2026 Ez Mil released the song ‘Madara’ (stylized in all caps) with Eminem, Hideyoshi, Neil Kaplan and the voice of Madara Uchiha.

== Artistry ==
=== Influences ===
Chris Brown is one of Miller's biggest influences, with his vocals and dance moves. Other rapping influences include Tupac, Eminem, ASAP Rocky, Kendrick Lamar, Royce da 5'9", Anderson .Paak, Nipsey Hussle, Tech N9ne, and Hopsin. Filipino rapper Gloc-9 is also a key influence, specifically his song "Hari ng Tondo". The dance troupe Jabbawockeez also inspired him to learn more dance styles such as krump, b-boy, and many others.

=== Musical style ===
Miller has ventured into the genres rap, hip-hop, and R&B. He is known for mixing traditional Filipino beats with modern rap beats. He also is known for his thought-provoking lyrics, rapid-fire delivery, intricate wordplay, and seamless flow. Aside from rapping in English and Tagalog, he can also rap in Ilocano.

Aside from rapping, Miller can also play the guitar and piano. Before becoming a rapper, he made deathcore music with an alter ego known as Slashmouth.

== Personal life ==
Miller has a girlfriend. He currently lives in Las Vegas, Nevada. His other talents include illustrative art and skateboarding. He is also the co-owner of the C3 Seafood & Bar (now called Seafood Soundz and Bar) in Las Vegas, Nevada.

== Awards and nominations ==
Key
†	Indicates non-competitive categories

Award	Year	Work	Category	Result	Ref.
Star Awards for Music	2023	"Re-up"	Rap Artist of the Year	Won	
The Outstanding Filipinos of America Award (TOFA)	2021	Himself	Youth †	Won	
Wish 107.5 Music Awards	2022	"Panalo"	Wishclusive Hip-Hop Performance of the Year	Nominated	
Wish 107.5 Music Awards	2022	Himself	Wishclusive Elite Circle †	Gold	
Wish 107.5 Music Awards	2023	"Re-up"	Wishclusive Hip-Hop Song of the Year	Nominated	

=== Listicles ===
Name of publisher, name of listicle, year(s) listed, and placement result
Publisher	Listicle	Year(s)	Result	Ref.
Forbes Asia	30 Under 30	2024	Included	

== Discography ==
=== Studio albums ===
List of studio albums by Ez Mil
Title	Album details
Act 1	Released: July 7, 2020; Label: FFP; Formats: Digital download, streaming
Resonances	Released: October 25, 2020; Label: FFP; Formats: Digital download, streaming
DU4LI7Y	Released: July 27, 2022; Label: FFP, Virgin; Formats: Digital download, streaming
DU4LI7Y: Redux	Released: August 11, 2023; Label: FFP, Virgin, Shady, Aftermath, Interscope; Formats: Digital download, streaming, CD

=== Singles ===
List of singles, showing year released, selected chart positions, and associated albums
Title	Year	Peak chart positions				Album
Title	Year	US Bub.	CAN	NZ Hot	UK Down.	Album
"Hyperthermia"	2017	—	—	—	—	Non-album singles
"Till' You're Dead"	2018	—	—	—	—	Non-album singles
"Runnin'"	2019	—	—	—	—	Non-album singles
"Lackland"	2019	—	—	—	—	Non-album singles
"Freeze"	2020	—	—	—	—	Non-album singles
"Cultura"	2020	—	—	—	—	Non-album singles
"Easy-Going Millions"	2020	—	—	—	—	Act 1
"Superly Real"	2020	—	—	—	—	Act 1
"Come Through"	2020	—	—	—	—	Act 1
"1 & Only"	2020	—	—	—	—	Act 1
"Panalo"	2020	—	—	—	—	Act 1
"Far Away from Home"	2020	—	—	—	—	Act 1
"Lonely Days"	2020	—	—	—	—	Act 1
"Laboy"	2020	—	—	—	—	Act 1
"The Shashy Show"	2020	—	—	—	—	Act 1
"IDK"	2020	—	—	—	—	Act 1
"King I Be"	2020	—	—	—	—	Act 1
"Waste My Time"	2020	—	—	—	—	Act 1
"Omoshiroi!" (面白い!) (featuring Anji)	2020	—	—	—	—	Act 1
"Fraud"	2020	—	—	—	—	Act 1
",,,,,,,"	2020	—	—	—	—	Act 1
"All Hallow's Eve"	2020	—	—	—	—	Act 1
"Brittle"	2020	—	—	—	—	Resonance EP
"Into It All"	2020	—	—	—	—	Resonance EP
"I've Known You Not"	2020	—	—	—	—	Resonance EP
"As You"	2020	—	—	—	—	Resonance EP
"Plenty More"	2020	—	—	—	—	Resonance EP
"1st & Last"	2020	—	—	—	—	Resonance EP
"Strength"	2020	—	—	—	—	Resonance EP
"Panalo" (Pacquiao Version)	2021	—	—	—	—	Non-album singles
"Victorious"	2021	—	—	—	—	Non-album singles
"Rapture"	2022	—	—	—	—	DU4LI7Y
"Ridin' with the Moonlight"	2022	—	—	—	—	DU4LI7Y
"Can You Keep a Secret"	2022	—	—	—	—	DU4LI7Y
"Spring"	2022	—	—	—	—	DU4LI7Y
"27 Bodies"	2022	—	—	—	—	DU4LI7Y
"Dalawampu't Dalawang Oo (2200)"	2022	—	—	—	—	DU4LI7Y
"Re-Up"	2022	—	—	—	—	DU4LI7Y
"Up Down (Step & Walk)"	2022	—	—	—	—	DU4LI7Y
"Greed"	2022	—	—	—	—	DU4LI7Y
"Will You"	2022	—	—	—	—	DU4LI7Y
"Podium"	2023	—	—	—	—	DU4LI7Y: Redux
"Coin$"	2023	—	—	—	—	DU4LI7Y: Redux
"The Long Run"	2023	—	—	—	—	DU4LI7Y: Redux
"Realest" (with Eminem)	2023	25	95	3	27	DU4LI7Y: Redux
"Into It All"	2023	—	—	—	—	DU4LI7Y: Redux
"Madara" (with Eminem)	2026	—	—	28	—	Non-album single
