= The Juans =

Filipino pop rock band

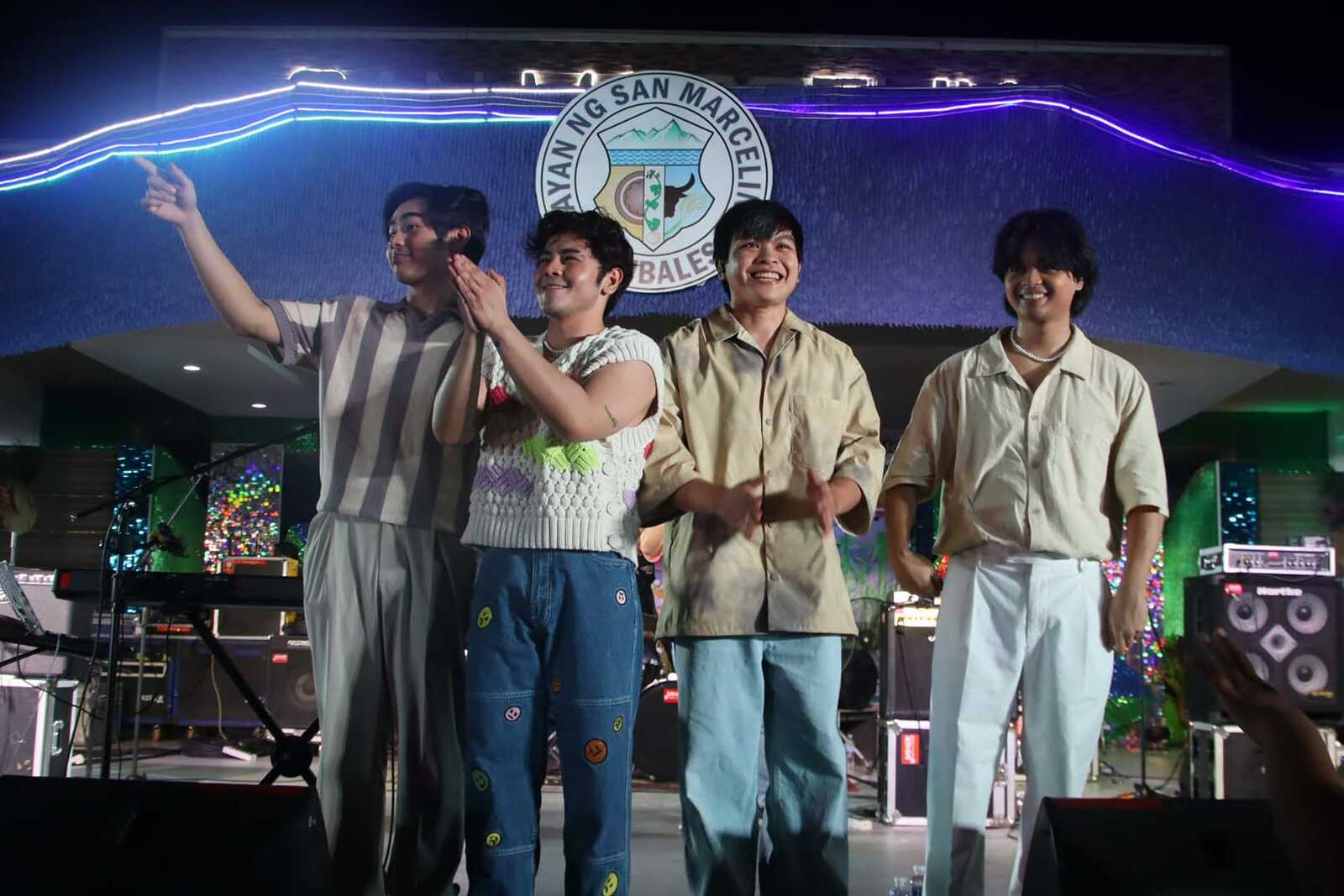
- The Juans at San Marcelino, Zambales in 2023

Background information
- Origin: Malolos, Bulacan
- Genres: Pop; pop rock; indie; neo soul
- Years active: 2013–present
- Labels: Viva Records; Believe Music
- Members: Carl Guevarra; Japs Mendoza; Chael Adriano; RJ Cruz
- Past members: Jiad Arroyo; Jason de Mesa; Daniel Grospe; Joshua Coronel

The Juans (stylized in lowercase) is a Filipino pop rock band based in Bulacan, Philippines. It currently consists of lead vocalist and keyboardist Carl Guevarra, vocalist and lead guitarist Japs Mendoza, vocalist and bassist Chael Adriano, and vocalist and acoustic guitarist RJ Cruz.

== History ==
The Juans was initially categorized as a boy band, but the management team decided to recategorize them as a conventional band. Jiad Arroyo was a founding member, along with Daniel Grospe. Carl Guevarra, Jason de Mesa, and Japs Mendoza joined later.

The band was initially named at a coffee shop shortly after a One Direction concert, where the boys were mulling the British boy band's popularity. They were initially called the D’ Juans, after Juan De La Cruz.

In 2018, The Juans announced the departure of three members, Jiad Arroyo, Jason De Mesa, and Daniel Grospe, as their contract with Viva Records is about to expire.

Before they departed, the band, along with Viva Records, created a miniseries called "We Are The Juans". They had recorded the EP, "Umaga", before the three members left the band. Not so long after, The Juans introduced their new members, RJ Cruz, Chael Adriano, and Joshua Coronel.

They released the single "Dulo" in October 2021.

Their March 2022 album LIWANAG was their first effort with more than two members contributing songs. The album, according to the band, took over a year to complete.

By June 2022, the band announced the departure of drummer Joshua Coronel citing personal reasons.

It was revealed in October 2022 they were recording the theme song for the ABS-CBN series Tara, G!.

== Band members ==
=== Current members ===
- Carl Guevarra (lead vocals, keyboards) (2013–present)
- Japs Mendoza (vocals, lead guitar) (2013–present)
- Chael Adriano (vocals, bass guitar) (2018–present)
- RJ Cruz (vocals, acoustic guitar) (2018–present)

=== Former members ===
- Jiad Arroyo (vocals, lead guitar) (2013-2018)
- Jason De Mesa (vocals, bass guitar) (2013-2018)
- Daniel Grospe (vocals, drums) (2013-2018)
- Joshua Coronel (drums) (2018-2022)

== Discography ==
=== Extended plays ===
List of extended plays, with selected details
Title	Details
The Juans	Released: 2015; Label: Viva; Format: Digital download, 12"; Track listing: 1. "Atin Ang Mundo"; 2. "Prom"; 3. "Magkasama"
Umaga	Released: 2018; Label: Viva; Format: Digital download, 12", streaming; Track listing: 1. "Umaga"; 2. "Panaginip"; 3. "Hindi Tayo Pwede"; 4. "Hatid"; 5. "Itutulog Na Lang"; 6. "Lumalapit"

=== Album ===
List of albums, with selected details
Title	Details
Liwanag	Released: 2022; Label: Viva; Format: Digital download, 12", streaming; Track listing: 1. "The Juans"; 2. "Liwanag"; 3. "Pangalan"; 4. "Pinakahihintay"; 5. "Anghel"; 6. "Sabik"; 7. "Salamin"; 8. "Love You"; 9. "Kahon"; 10. "Still Standing"; 11. "Teka Muna"; 12. "Kuya"; 13. "Dulo"; 14. "Sa'yo Lang Ako"; 15. "Nandito Na"

=== Singles ===
List of singles, showing year released and album name
Title	Year	Album
"Atin Ang Mundo"	2015	The Juans
"Magkasama"	2015	The Juans
"Prom"	2015	The Juans
"Binibini Sa MRT"	2016	Philpop
"Nasayang Lang"	2016	Non-album single
"Balisong"	2017	100 Tula Para Kay Stella
"Istorya"	2017	Non-album single
"'Yan Tayo, Eh"	2018	Squad Goals
"Darkness Fell"	2018	Sid & Aya
"Pag-ibig Lang"	2018	The Day After Valentine's
"Lumalapit"	2018	Umaga
"Hindi Tayo Pwede"	2019	Umaga
"Hatid"	2020	Umaga
"Sirang Plaka"	2020	Non-album singles
"Manalangin"	2020	Non-album singles
"BTNS" (with Janine Teñoso)	2020	Non-album singles
"Pangalawang Bitaw"	2020	Non-album singles
"Dulo"	2021	Liwanag
"Anghel"	2021	Liwanag
"Sabik"	2021	Liwanag
"Tara, G!"	2022	Tara, G!
"Gupit" (with Alamat)	2024	

=== Chart performance ===
List of other charted songs, with selected chart positions and album name
Title	Year	Peak chart positions		Album
Title	Year	PH		Album
Title	Year	Hit Chart	Pinoy	Album
"Atin Ang Mundo"	2015	—	9	The Juans
"Prom"	2016	15	8	The Juans
"Binibini Sa MRT"	2016	—	13	Philpop
"Nasayang Lang"	2017	13	6	Non-album single
"Balisong"	2017	4	4	100 Tula Para Kay Stella
"Istorya"	2017	8	4	Non-album single
"Lumalapit"	2018	—	14	Umaga
"Hindi Tayo Pwede"	2019	10	5	Umaga
"Hatid"	2020	7	5	Umaga
"Sirang Plaka"	2020	2	2	Non-album singles
"Manalangin"	2020	19	9	Non-album singles
"Pangalawang Bitaw"	2021	9	6	Non-album singles
"Dulo"	2021	3	3	Non-album singles
"Anghel"	2021	9	7	Non-album singles

== Filmography ==
=== Music videos ===
List of music videos as lead artist, showing year released and directors
Title	Year	Director(s)	Ref.
"Atin Ang Mundo"	2015	Ryan Evangelista	
"Prom"	2016	Mike Cabardo	
"Binibini Sa MRT"	2016	—N/a	
"Nasayang Lang"	2017	Kiko Meiley	
"Balisong"	2017	Ryan Evangelista	
"Istorya"	2017	Ryan Evangelista	
"'Yan Tayo, Eh"	2018	—N/a	
"Darkness Fell"	2018	—N/a	
"Lumalapit"	2018	Miggy Tanchanco	
"Hindi Tayo Pwede"	2019	Miggy Tanchanco	
"Hatid"	2020	Miggy Tanchanco	
"Sirang Plaka"	2020	Miggy Tanchanco	
"Manalangin"	2020	Paul Basinillo	
"BTNS" (with Janine Teñoso)	2020	Miggy Tanchanco	
"Pangalawang Bitaw"	2021	Jason Max	
"Dulo"	2021	Carl Guevarra	
"Anghel"	2021	Carl Guevarra	
"Sabik"	2021	Kevin Mayuga	
"Tara, G!"	2022	Charlie Mango	

== Awards and nominations ==
Award ceremony	Year	Category	Nominee(s)/work(s)	Result	Ref.
Awit Award	2016	Performance by a Group	The Juans	Nominated	
Awit Award	2017	Best Ballad Recording	"Nasayang Lang - The Juans"	Nominated	
Myx Music Awards	2016	Favorite New Artist	The Juans	Nominated	
Myx Music Awards	2017	Favorite Group of the Year	The Juans	Won	
Myx Music Awards	2018	Favorite Group of the Year	The Juans	Nominated	
Myx Music Awards	2018	Media Soundtrack of the Year	"Balisong - The Juans"	Nominated	
PMPC Star Awards for Music	2016	Dance Album of the Year	"The Juans - The Juans"	Nominated	
PMPC Star Awards for Music	2016	Group/Duo of the Year	The Juans	Nominated	
Wish Music Awards	2017	Wish Original Song of the Year	"Prom - The Juans"	Won	
Wish Music Awards	2017	Best Wishclusive Performance by a Group/Duo	The Juans	Nominated	
Wish Music Awards	2018	Wish Pop Song of the Year	"Nasayang Lang - The Juans"	Nominated	
Wish Music Awards	2021	Best Quarantine Produced Song	"Manalangin - The Juans"	Won	
Wish Music Awards	2021	Wishclusive Collaboration of the Year	"Bakit ‘To Nangyari Sa’tin" with Janine Teñoso	Won	
Wish Music Awards	2021	Wish Group of the Year	The Juans	Nominated	
Wish Music Awards	2021	Wishclusive Pop Performance of the Year	"Hindi Tayo Pwede - The Juans"	Won	
Wish Music Awards	2021	Wish Pop Song of the Year	"Sirang Plaka - The Juans"	Nominated	
Wish Music Awards	2022	Wish Ballad Song of The Year	"Pangalawang Bitaw - The Juans"	Won	
Wish Music Awards	2022	Wishclusive Rock/Alternative Performance of the Year	"Dulo - The Juans"	Won	
Wish Music Awards	2022	Wish Group of The Year	The Juans	Nominated	
