= Wish 107.5 Music Awards =

Philippine radio station awards

- Current: 9th Wish Music Awards
- Awarded for: Outstanding achievements in the music industry
- Country: Philippines
- Presented by: Wish 107.5
- First award: January 26, 2016; 10 years ago
- Final award: January 14, 2024; 2 years ago

Highlights
- Most awards: Morissette (38 awards)
- Most nominations: Morissette (44 nominations)
- Website: www.wish1075.com/wishawards/

The Wish 107.5 Music Awards (abbreviated as WMA) are an annual accolades presented by the FM radio station Wish 107.5, which aims to pay tribute to acts and artists who have given significant contributions in the music scene in the Philippines. The awards ceremony is held annually every January at the Smart Araneta Coliseum, with the exception of the 2020 edition which was held at the Mall of Asia Arena, as well as the 2022 edition being taped at the New Frontier Theater due to the Omicron outbreak during the COVID-19 pandemic in the Philippines.

Winners are determined through the votes of fans (also called Wishers) (20%) and a panel of judges (80%). Wishers can cast their votes via the WMA website (using a Facebook and/or Twitter account), the Wish app, and the Wish YouTube channel. WMA polling sites are also put up in key establishments across the Philippines.

Apart from the usual award-giving repertoire, the Wish Music Awards distinguishes itself from other bodies as it incorporates the concept of wish granting. During WMAs, Wish hands out ₱100,000 to the chosen beneficiaries of every major award winner. This comes on top of the ₱25,000 cash prize that the artists themselves receive. Since the awards show was first held in 2016, it has already doled out a total of ₱7.125 million to different OPM acts and their hand-picked philanthropic organizations.

== Award categories ==
=== Major categories ===
==== Wishclusive Performance of the Year ====
The Wishclusive Performance of the Year awards are given to the best Wishclusive (Wish-exclusive) performances inside the Wish 107.5 Bus.

- Wishclusive Ballad Performance of the Year

Year	Artists
2018	5thGen – "Panahon"
2019	Morissette – "Akin Ka Na Lang"
2020	KZ Tandingan – "Quicksand"
2021	Darren Espanto – "Sasagipin Kita"
2022	SB19 – "Hanggang Sa Huli"
2023	Ben&Ben – "Magpahinga"
2024	The Ang Huling El Bimbo Cast – "Ligaya" / "Ang Huling El Bimbo"
2025	SB19 – "Ilaw"
2026	SB19 – "Time"

- Wishclusive Collaboration of the Year

Year	Artists
2017	Morissette and Arnel Pineda – "I Finally Found Someone"
2018	Curse One/Dello/Flict-G/Smugglaz – "Nakakamiss"
2019	Moira Dela Torre and December Avenue – "Kung Di Rin Lang Ikaw"
2020	Morissette, Darren Espanto – "A Whole New World"
2021	The Juans, Janine Teñoso – "BTNS (Bakit 'To Nangyari Sa'tin)"
2022	KZ Tandingan and TJ Monterde – "Nakakamiss"
2023	Janine Berdin and Adie – "Mahika"
2024	Sponge Cola and Morissette – "So Close"
2025	Zack Tabudlo and Al James – "Gusto"
2026	James Reid & TJ Monterde– "Pahinga"

- Wishclusive Contemporary Folk Performance of the Year

Year	Artists
2018	Moira Dela Torre – "Malaya"
2019	Ben&Ben – "Maybe the Night"
2020	Clara Benin – "I Rose Up Slowly"
2021	Ben&Ben – "Araw-Araw"
2022	Ben&Ben – "Sa Susunod na Habangbuhay"
2023	Adie – "Tahanan"
2024	TONEEJAY – "Bawat Piyesa (Secret Verse Ver.)"
2025	Cup of Joe – "Ikaw Pa Rin Ang Pipiliin Ko"
2026	Amiel Sol – "Sa Bawat Sandali"

- Wishclusive Hip-Hop Performance of the Year

Year	Artists
2019	Gloc-9 – "TRPKNNMN"
2020	O.C. Dawgs – "Pauwi Nako"
2021	Michael Pacquiao – "Hate"
2022	Ez Mil – "Panalo"
2023	Flow G – "Praning"
2024	Felip – "ROCKSTA"
2025	Loonie – "Tugmang Preso"
2026	Paul N' Ballin – "POGI"

- Wishclusive Pop Performance of the Year

Year	Artists
2018	Morissette – "Rise Up"
2019	Eumee Capile – "Bratatat"
2020	SB19 – "Go Up"
2021	The Juans – "Hindi Tayo Pwede"
2022	SB19 – "Ikako"
2023	SB19 – "Bazinga"
2024	SB19 – "Gento"
2025	Bini – "Karera"
2026	SB19 – "Dam"

- Wishclusive R&B Performance of the Year

Year	Artists
2018	Michael Pangilinan – "Tayo Na Lang"
2019	Daryl Ong – "Nais Kong Malaman Mo"
2020	Quest – "Permanente"
2021	Skusta Clee – "Zebbiana"
2022	Jay R – "Hinay"
2023	Felip – "Palayo"
2024	SB19 – "I Want You"
2025	Jay R – "Guiding Star"
2026	Lil Eddie & Jay R – "Statue (Tagalish version)"

- Wishclusive Rock/Alternative Performance of the Year

Year	Artists
2018	Tom's Story – "Anchors"
2019	IV of Spades – "Mundo"
2020	IV of Spades – "Bawat Kaluluwa"
2021	Unique Salonga – "Sino"
2022	The Juans – "Pangalawang Bitaw"
2023	Zild – "Huminga"
2024	Dilaw – "Uhaw"
2025	Dilaw – "Orasa"
2026	Cup of Joe – "Multo"

- Wishclusive Urban/Contemporary R&B Performance of the Year

Year	Artists
2018	IV of Spades – "Ilaw Sa Daan"
2019	Leanne and Naara – "New York and Back"
2020	Ben&Ben – "Pagtingin"
2021	Julie Anne San Jose – "Nobela"
2022	Arthur Nery – "Binhi"
2023	Leanne & Naara – "Anticipation"
2024	Zack Tabudlo – "Pano"
2025	Yeng Constantino – "Babala"
2026	Janine – "Hulaan"

- Wishclusive Performance of the Year

Year	Artists
2016	Yeng Constantino – "Ikaw" (female)
2016	Jason Dy – "Stay With Me/See You Again Mash-up" (male)
2016	5th Gen – "Contagious" (group/duo)
2016	Darren Espanto – "Chandelier" (young artist)
2017	Morissette – "Secret Love Song" (female)
2017	Jason Dy – "Love Yourself/Sorry/What Do You Mean/Baby mash-up" (male)
2017	4th Impact – "Love The Way You Lie" (group/duo)
2017	Darren Espanto – "I Believe" (young artist)

- Wishclusive Best Cover of the Year

Year	Artists
2016	"In Love Ako Sa'yo" – Darren Espanto
2017	"Be My Lady" – Jason Dy

- Wishclusive Performance of the Year by an International Artist

Year	Artists
2018	Dua Lipa – "Blow Your Mind"

==== Song of the Year ====
The Song of the Year awards are given to the best songs by genre.

- Wish Original Song of the Year

Year	Artists
2016	"Stuck" – Darren Espanto
2017	"Throwback" – Morissette feat. KZ Tandingan (female)
2017	"7 Minutes" – Darren Espanto (male)
2017	"Prom" – The Juans (group/duo)

- Wish Ballad Song of the Year

Year	Artists
2016	"I Believe In Me" – Darren Espanto
2018	"Ano Nga Ba Tayo" – Jona
2019	"Balang Araw" – I Belong to the Zoo
2020	"Ikaw At Ako" – Moira Dela Torre, Jason Marvin
2021	"Hanggang Sa Huli" – Moira Dela Torre
2022	"Dulo" – The Juans
2023	"Kumpas" – Moira Dela Torre
2024	"kisame" – rhodessa
2025	"'Di Ko Masabi" – Stell
2026	"Darating Din" - TJ Monterde –

- Wish Contemporary Folk Song of the Year

Year	Artists
2018	"Leaves" – Ben&Ben
2019	"Sunrise" – Ben&Ben
2020	"An Opportunity To Go To The Moon" – Reese Lansangan
2021	"Lifetime" – Ben&Ben
2022	"Paubaya" – Moira Dela Torre
2023	"Paninindigan Kita" – Ben&Ben
2024	"Musika" – Dionela
2025	"Umaycan" – Noel Cabangon
2026	"Saranggola" - Ben&Ben

- Wish Hip-Hop Song of the Year

Year	Artists
2019	"Shantidope" – Shanti Dope
2020	"Urong; Sulong" – Kiyo, Alisson Shore
2021	"ABAKADA" – Gloc-9 (ft. Mark Beats)
2022	"Ibong Adarna" – Flow ft. Gloc-9
2023	"Kagome" – LoKi
2024	"Rapstar" – Flow G
2025	"Get Right" – Josh Cullen
2026	"Gusto Ko Sakin Ka Lang" - Robledo Timido

- Wish Pop Song of the Year

Year	Artists
2018	"Mahika" – TJ Monterde
2019	"Panaginip" – Morissette
2020	"Ikaw At Ikaw Pa Rin" – Sam Mangubat
2021	"Love Goes" – SB19
2022	"What" – SB19
2023	"WYAT" – SB19
2024	"Palagi" – TJ Monterde
2025	"Pantropiko" – Bini
2026	"Dungka" - SB19

- Wish R&B Song of the Year

Year	Artists
2018	"Kabilang Dako" – Jay R
2019	"Fix You And Me" – Kyla
2020	"Filipina Girl" – Billy Crawford, James Reid, Marcus Davis
2021	"Better" – Julie Anne San Jose
2022	"Take All The Love" – Arthur Nery
2023	"Hello 2.0 (Legends Only)" – James Reid
2024	"'Di Na Babalik" – Leanne & Naara
2025	"Sining" – Dionela and Jay R
2026	"Marilag" - Dionela

- Wish Rock/Alternative Song of the Year

Year	Artists
2016	"Move On" – Spongecola
2018	"Hey Barbara" – IV of Spades
2019	"Buwan" – Juan Karlos Labajo
2020	"Nagbabalik" – IV of Spades, Rico Blanco
2021	"Lakas" – COLN
2022	"Bungantulog" – Zild
2023	"Asan Ka Na Ba?" – Zack Tabudlo
2024	"Parola" – Moonstar88
2025	"Kanako" – Felip
2026	"Multo" - Cup of Joe

- Wish Urban/Contemporary R&B Song of the Year

Year	Artists
2016	"Milagro" – Jason Dy
2018	"Labo" – KZ Tandingan
2019	"Down For Me" – Julie Anne San Jose (feat. Fern.)
2020	"Sway" – Paolo Sandejas
2021	"Teka Lang" – EMMAN (posthumous)
2022	"Hello" – James Reid
2023	"Pagsamo" – Arthur Nery
2024	"Paki Sabi" – SunKissed Lola
2025	"Segundo, Segundo" – Arthur Nery
2026	"Tayong Dalawaa" - Earl Agustin

- Wish Song Collaboration of the Year

Year	Artists
2025	"Kalakal" – SB19 and Gloc-9
2026	"Umaaligid" - SB19 and Sarah Geronimo

==== Artist of the Year ====
The Artist of the Year awards are given to the best solo artist, group, and new solo artist.

- Wish Artist of the Year

Year	Artists
2016	Morissette (female)
2016	Jason Dy (male)
2017	Morissette (female)
2017	Jason Dy (male)
2018	Morissette
2019	Morissette
2020	KZ Tandingan
2021	Gloc-9
2022	Moira Dela Torre
2023	Moira Dela Torre
2024	Flow G
2025	Pablo
2026	TJ Monterde

- Wish Group of the Year

Year	Artists
2018	Ben&Ben
2019	IV of Spades
2020	Ben&Ben
2021	SB19
2022	SB19
2023	SB19
2024	SB19
2025	Bini
2026	Cup of Joe

- Wish Promising/Breakthrough Artist of the Year

Year	Artists
2016	Jensen and the Flips
2017	Sam Mangubat
2018	Extrapolation
2019	Eumee Capile
2020	SB19
2021	Zild
2022	Zack Tabudlo
2023	Felip
2024	Josh Cullen
2025	Stell
2026	Earl Agustin

- Wish Young Artist of the Year

Year	Artists
2016	Darren Espanto
2017	Darren Espanto
2018	Ylona Garcia

=== Special awards ===
- Wishers' Choice Award

Year	Artists
2019	Morissette
2020	SB19
2021	SB19
2022	SB19
2023	SB19
2024	Josh Cullen
2025	Stell
2026	SB19

- Wishclusive Viral Videos of the Year

Year	Artists
2016	Darren Espanto – "Chandelier"
2017	Morissette – "Secret Love Song"
2018	Curse One/ Dello/ Flict-G/ Smugglaz – "Nakakamiss"
2018	Moira Dela Torre – "Malaya"
2018	KZ Tandingan – "Two Less Lonely People In The World"

- Wish Reactors' Choice

Year	Artists
2017	Morissette – "Secret Love Song"
2018	Morissette – "Rise Up"

- Wishers' Choice Artist of the Year

Year	Artists
2016	Morissette (female)
2016	Jason Dy (female)
2016	Maris Racal (young)

- Wishers' Choice Performance of the Year

Year	Artists
2016	Maris Racal – "Don't Know Why"

=== Elite Circle of Awards ===
Every year, the Wish 107.5 Music Awards honors artists whose Wishclusive performances have fared well in the music community through the Wishclusive Elite Circle Award.

The view-count-based recognition serves as the highest citation given during every WMA. From the original December 31, the cut-off date has been moved to October 31 starting year 2018 to coincide with the WMA nominations' eligibility period (November 1, 2017 until October 31, 2018).

Depending on the YouTube hits achieved by a Wishclusive video on the cut-off, an artist can receive the following awards:

- Diamond Wishclusive Elite Circle for 100 million views

Year	Artists
2020	Morissette – "Akin Ka Na Lang"
2020	Morissette – "Secret Love Song"
2020	Michael Pangilinan – "Bakit Ba Ikaw"
2020	Bugoy Drilon – "One Day"
2021	no recipient
2022	no recipient
2023	no recipient
2024	O.C. Dawgs – "Pauwi Nako"

- Platinum Wishclusive Elite Circle for 75 million views

Year	Artists
2019	Morissette – "Secret Love Song"
2020	Morissette – "Akin Ka Na Lang"
2021	O.C. Dawgs – "Pauwi Nako"
2022	Morissette – "Against All Odds"
2024	December Avenue, Moira Dela Torre – "Kung 'Di Rin Lang Ikaw"
2024	Nik Makino (feat. Flow G) – "Moon"

- Gold Wishclusive Elite Circle for 50 million views

Year	Artists
2018	Morissette – "Secret Love Song"
2019	Morissette – "Akin Ka Na Lang"
2019	Morissette – "Against All Odds"
2020	Curse One, Dello, Flict-G, and Smugglaz – "Nakakamiss"
2020	O.C. Dawgs – "Pauwi Nako"
2020	Sue Ramirez – "Your Love"
2020	KZ Tandingan – "Tadhana"
2021	Callalily – "Magbalik"
2021	Pricetagg (ft. CLR) – "Kontrabida"
2022	Bandang Lapis – "Kabilang Buhay"
2022	Ez Mil – "Panalo"
2022	Gloc-9 ft. Flow G – "Halik"
2022	Regine Velasquez – "Araw Gabi"
2024	CLR and Omar Baliw – "K&B"

- Silver Wishclusive Elite Circle for 25 million views

Year	Artists
2018	Morissette – "Against All Odds"
2018	KZ Tandingan – "Two Less Lonely People In The World"
2018	KZ Tandingan – "Tadhana"
2018	Bugoy Drilon – "One Day"
2018	Sue Ramirez – "Your Love"
2019	Morissette – "Akin Ka Na Lang"
2020	Moira Dela Torre and December Avenue – "Kung 'Di Rin Lang Ikaw"
2020	December Avenue – "Sa Ngalan Ng Pag-ibig"
2020	ALLMO$T – "Dalaga"
2020	Regine Velasquez-Alcasid – "Araw Gabi"
2020	Callalily – "Magbalik"
2020	Pricetagg (featuring CLR) – "Kontrabida"
2020	Julie Anne San Jose – "Your Song"
2020	Michael Pangilinan – "Your Love"
2020	Dong Abay – "Perpekto"
2020	Moonstar88 – "Migraine"
2020	Jay R – "Bakit Pa Ba"
2020	O.C. Dawgs – "Pauwi Nako"
2021	Morissette, Darren Espanto – "A Whole New World"
2021	Magnus Haven – "Imahe"
2021	Moira Dela Torre – "Malaya"
2023	Morissette, Arnel Pineda – "I Finally Found Someone"
2024	Morissette – "Mahal Naman Kita"
2024	Bandang Lapis – "Pagsisisi"
2024	Bandang Lapis – "Nang Dumating Ka"
2024	Kris Lawrence – "Kung Malaya Lang Ako"
2024	Crazy as Pinoy – "Panaginip"

- Bronze Wishclusive Elite Circle for 10 million views

Year	Artists
2017	Morissette – "Secret Love Song"
2017	Morissette – "Against All Odds"
2017	Darren Espanto – "Chandelier"
2017	Bugoy Drilon – One Day
2018	Morissette – "Chandelier"
2018	Moira Dela Torre – "Malaya"
2018	Kris Lawrence – "Versace On The Floor"
2018	Michael Pangilinan – "Your Love"
2018	Curse One/ Dello/ Flict-G/ Smugglaz – "Nakakamiss"
2018	Regine Velasquez-Alcasid – "Araw-Gabi"
2018	Yeng Constantino – "Ikaw"
2019	Morissette – "Mahal Naman Kita"
2019	Morissette, Arnel Pineda – "I Finally Found Someone"
2019	Morissette – "Akin Ka Na Lang"
2020	Morissette, Darren Espanto – "A Whole New World"
2020	Kiyo and Alisson Shore – "Urong; Sulong"
2020	CLR – "Bat Ngayon (Part 1)"
2020	December Avenue – "Kahit 'Di Mo Alam"
2020	Moira Dela Torre and IV of Spades – "Same Ground"
2021	Al James – "Pwede Ba" (Lola Amour cover)
2021	CLR, Omar Baliw – "K&B"
2021	Michael Pacquiao – "Hate"
2021	Skusta Clee – "Zebbiana"
2024	Adie, Janine Berdin – "Mahika
2024	Crazy as Pinoy – "Panaginip"
2024	SunKissed Lola – "Pasilyo"
2024	Dilaw – "Uhaw"

== Ceremonies ==
Edition	Date	Venue	Host(s)
1st	January 26, 2016	Smart Araneta Coliseum	Robi Domingo, Gretchen Ho
2nd	January 16, 2017	Smart Araneta Coliseum	Robin Nievera, Alex Diaz, Gretchen Ho
3rd	January 15, 2018	Smart Araneta Coliseum	Christian Bautista, Gretchen Ho
4th	January 15, 2019	Smart Araneta Coliseum	Christian Bautista, Gretchen Ho
5th	January 19, 2020	SM Mall of Asia Arena	Christian Bautista, Gretchen Ho
6th	January 17, 2021	Smart Araneta Coliseum (Note: This edition was held without a live audience due to the restrictions implemented by the COVID-19 pandemic in the Philippines.)	Christian Bautista, Gretchen Ho
7th	January 30, 2022	New Frontier Theater (Note: This edition was supposed to be held at the Smart Araneta Coliseum with a limited live audience, however, it was instead moved to the New Frontier Theater, and held without a live audience due to the surge of COVID-19 cases due to the Omicron variant.)	Gretchen Ho, Xian Lim
8th	January 30, 2023	Smart Araneta Coliseum	Gretchen Ho, Christian Bautista
9th	January 14, 2024	Smart Araneta Coliseum	Wish DJs
10th	January 19, 2025	Smart Araneta Coliseum	Wish DJs
11th	January 11, 2026	Smart Araneta Coliseum	Wish DJs

On January 26, 2016, the WMA was held at,the Smart Araneta Coliseum. With the theme, "Your Coolest Musical Experience," Wish 107.5 celebrated the then-budding popularity of the country's first-ever FM-on-wheels, the Wish 107.5 Bus.

=== 2nd Wish 107.5 Awards ===
Wish 107.5 has successfully staged its 2nd Wish 107.5 Music Awards on January 16, 2017, at the Smart Araneta Coliseum. The revelry themed, "Your WISHclusive Gateway to the World," held Filipino musicality in high esteem and paid tribute to the artists who lifted OPM to global recognition.

A total of 75 artists vied in 13 categories. Three special awards were also handed out, namely Wish Reactors' Choice, WISHclusive Viral Video of the Year, and WISHclusive Elite Circle.

=== 3rd Wish 107.5 Awards ===
Wish 107.5 held the third edition of the Wish Music Awards on January 15, 2018, at the Smart Araneta Coliseum. The event, themed "Taking Filipino Music Across the Globe," was a fitting homage to the artists who continue the world-class legacy of our country's homegrown music and talent.

Making the winners' success more meaningful was the opportunity to give cash donations to their chosen beneficiaries. While those who bagged major awards received Php 25,000, their respective charitable groups were granted with Php 100,000.

Wish 107.5 has shelled out a total of Php 2.125 million for this year alone.

=== 4th Wish 107.5 Awards ===
More than 80 artists whose songs were released and Wishclusives were rendered from November 1, 2017, to October 31, 2018, are nominated in the 18 categories of the 4th Wish 107.5 Music Awards. The awards night is slated on January 15, 2019, at the Smart Araneta Coliseum.

=== 5th Wish 107.5 Awards ===
Unlike previous Wish awards, the 2020 event was held on a Sunday and at the SM Mall of Asia Arena instead.

=== 6th Wish 107.5 Awards ===
Due to the imposed regulations for the mitigation of the COVID-19 pandemic in the Philippines, the 2021 edition of the awards was streamed live through Wish 107.5's official YouTube channel on January 17, 2021, and held at an audience-less Smart Araneta Coliseum. All performers of the awards ceremony, along with the hosts, organizers and certain invited nominees underwent swab testing and followed protocols to ensure their health and safety.

=== 7th Wish 107.5 Awards ===
The 2022 edition was initially projected to be the first live audience event since the pandemic. It was originally set to happen on January 16, 2022, at the Smart Araneta Coliseum with performances from Billboard Music Awards and MTV Europe Music Awards nominee SB19, fellow MTV Europe Music Awards nominee Ben&Ben, as well as notable Filipino artists Juan Karlos, Lyca Gairanod, and more. Guests will be required to provide negative COVID-19 results, while audience members are expected to follow standard health and safety protocols. However, due to a surge in COVID-19 cases in the country caused by the Omicron variant, the event cancelled its admission of live audience before being postponed to January 30, 2022, and moved to the New Frontier Theater.

== Statistics ==
=== Most awards by artist (including Elite Circle) ===
Bold text indicates most awards in a year.

Artist	Awards	Years won
Morissette	38	2 (2016), **8 (2017)**, **6 (2018)**, **11 (2019)**, **6 (2020)**, 1 (2021), 1 (2022), 1 (2023), 1 (2024)
SB19	29	3 (2020), **6 (2021)**, **5 (2022)**, **4 (2023)**, **4 (2024)**, 2 (2025), 5 (2026)
Darren Espanto	14	**6 (2016)**, 4 (2017), 2 (2020), 2 (2021)
Moira Dela Torre	14	3 2018, 1 (2019), 3 (2020), 2 2021, 2 (2022), 2 (2023), 1 (2024),
Ben&Ben	11	2 (2018), 2 (2019), 2 (2020), 2 (2021), 1 (2022), 2 (2023)
KZ Tandingan	9	1 (2017), 4 (2018), 3 (2020), 1 (2022)
Jason Dy	7	4 (2016), 3 (2017)
IV of Spades	7	2 (2018), 2 (2019), 3 (2020)
Flow G	7	2 (2022), 1 (2023), **4 (2024)**
The Juans	5	1 (2017), 2 (2021), 2 (2022)
Jay R	5	1 (2018), 1 (2020), 1 (2022), 2 (2025)
Gloc-9	5	1 (2019), 2 (2021), 2 (2022)
O.C. Dawgs	5	3 (2020), 1 (2021), 1 (2024)
CLR	5	2 (2020), 2 (2021), 1 (2024)
Arnel Pineda	4	1 (2017), 1 (2019), 1 (2021), 1 (2023)
Curse One	4	3 (2018), 1 (2020)
Dello	4	3 (2018), 1 (2020)
Smugglaz	4	3 (2018), 1 (2020)
Flict-G	4	3 (2018), 1 (2020)
December Avenue	4	1 (2019), 2 (2020), 1 (2024)
Michael Pangilinan	4	2 (2018), 2 (2020)
Regine Velasquez	4	1 (2018), 1 (2020), 1 (2022), 1 (2023)
Julie Anne San Jose	4	1 (2019), 1 (2020), 2 (2021)
Zack Tabudlo	4	1 (2022), 1 (2023), 1 (2024), 1 (2025)
Arthur Nery	4	2 (2022), 1 (2023), 1 (2025)
Felip	4	2 (2023), 1 (2024), 1 (2025)
Josh Cullen	4	3 (2024), 1 (2025)
Yeng Constantino	3	1 (2016), 1 (2018), 1 (2025)
Bugoy Drilon	3	1 (2017), 1 (2018), 1 (2020)
TJ Monterde	3	1 (2018), 1 (2022),1 (2024)
Leanne & Naara	3	1 (2019), 1 (2023), 1 (2024)
James Reid	3	1 (2020), 1 (2022), 1 (2023)
Zild	3	1 (2020), 1 (2022), 1 (2023)
Bandang Lapis	3	1 (2022), 2 (2024)
Adie	3	2 (2023), 1 (2024)
Dilaw	3	1 (2024), 2 (2025)
Bini	3	**3 (2025)**
Stell	3	**3 (2025)**

=== Most nominations by artist ===
**Bold**	Most awards for the year

Artist	Total	2016	2017	2018	2019	2020	2021	2022	2023	2024
Morissette	**42**	4	8	6	11	7	1	4	1	1
SB19	**16**	0	0	0	0	3	4	5	4	5
The Juans	**12**	0	1	0	0	3	3	3	0	2

=== Wish Hall of Fame Awards ===
Year	Artist	Award
2020	Morissette	The KDR Icon of Music and Philanthropy Award
2020	Alfonso 'Coke' Bolipata	The KDR Icon of Music and Philanthropy Award
2020	Ryan Cayabyab	The KDR Icon of Musical Excellence Award
2021	Arnel Pineda	The KDR Icon of Music and Philanthropy Award
2021	Rey Valera	The KDR Icon of Musical Excellence Award
2022	Ramon "Chino" Alfonso Soberano	The KDR Icon of Music and Philanthropy Award
2022	Louie Ocampo	The KDR Icon of Musical Excellence Award
2023	Andrea O. Veneracion	The KDR Icon of Music and Philanthropy Award
2023	Regine Velasquez	The KDR Icon of Musical Excellence Award
2024	William Guido	The KDR Icon of Music and Philanthropy Award
2024	Martin Nievera	The KDR Icon of Musical Excellence Award
2025	Apl.de.ap	The KDR Icon of Music and Philanthropy Award
2025	Ogie Alcasid	The KDR Icon of Musical Excellence Award
2026	Organisasyon ng Pilipino Mang-aawit	The KDR Icon of Music and Philanthropy Award
2026	Apo Hiking Society	The KDR Icon of Musical Excellence Award
2026	TJ Monterde	The KDR Icon of Breaking Boundaries

== See also ==
- Ang Dating Daan
- A Song of Praise Music Festival
- Radyo La Verdad 1350
- UNTV News & Rescue
- Wish 107.5
- Members Church of God International
- NU Rock Awards
- Mnet Asian Music Awards
