= 6th Wish 107.5 Music Awards =

Annual music award

Wish 107.5 Music Awards 2021
- Date: January 17, 2021
- Location: Smart Araneta Coliseum (artists and organizers); Wish 107.5's official YouTube channel (virtual audience)
- Country: Philippines
- Hosted by: Gretchen Ho, Christian Bautista

Highlights
- Most awards: SB19 (3), The Juans (3)
- Most nominations: The Juans (4)
- Website: www.wish1075.com/wishawards/

Wish 107.5 Music Awards 2021 was the 6th edition of the Wish 107.5 Music Awards, an accolade presented by the FM radio station Wish 107.5 to acknowledge the biggest hit-makers of the year in the Philippine music industry. The awards were held at the Smart Araneta Coliseum and livestreamed simultaneously on the official YouTube channel of Wish 107.5. The event was hosted by Gretchen Ho and singer Christian Bautista.

Due to the COVID-19 pandemic in the Philippines, the event was held with safety protocols implemented for the performers, hosts and organizers with a digital livestream on their official YouTube channel.

== Impact of the COVID-19 pandemic on the event ==
Due to the general community quarantine restrictions imposed in response to the COVID-19 pandemic in the Philippines, the event was held without a live audience. Instead, the event was livestreamed for free on Wish 107.5's YouTube channel for their audience to watch.

To ensure the health and safety of the performers, nominees, organizers and record label representatives who were invited to the event, they had to undergo swab testing and follow health and safety protocols such as social distancing guidelines along with following proper sanitation procedures.

== Winners and nominees ==
Winners are listed first and highlighted in boldface. Tagalog song titles are provided with English translations, enclosed inside parentheses.

Wish Artist of the Year	Wish Group of the Year
**Gloc-9** Beneficiary: Philippine Cancer Society; Clara Benin; Inigo Pascual; Rico Blanco	**SB19** Beneficiary: House of Refuge Foundation, Inc.; Ben&Ben; The Itchyworms; The Juans
Wish Breakthrough Artist of the Year	Wishclusive Pop Performance of the Year
**Zild** Beneficiary: Save Palawan Seas Foundation, Inc.; Michael Pacquiao; the vowels they orbit	**The Juans – "Hindi Tayo Pwede" (Cannot Be Us)** Beneficiary: A Home For The Angels Crisis Home For Abandoned Babies Foundation, Inc.; Inigo Pascual – "Balang Araw" (Someday); SB19 – "Alab" (Blaze); TJ Monterde – "Puhon" (Maybe)
Wishclusive Ballad Performance of the Year	Wishclusive R&B Performance of the Year
**Darren Espanto – "Sasagipin Kita"** (I Will Save You) Beneficiary: Save the Children Philippines; Jay Kent – “Mahal Pa Rin” (Loving Still); John Roa – “Oks Lang” (Just Okay); Juris – "Di Lang Ikaw" (Not Only You)	**Skusta Clee – "Zebbiana"** Beneficiary: ChildHope Philippines; Jay R – "No Pressure”; Kiana V – "Hide My Love”; Kris Lawrence – "Anong Gusto Mo" (What Do You Want)
Wishclusive Rock/Alternative Performance of the Year	Wishclusive Hip-hop Performance of the Year
**Unique Salonga – "Sino" (Who)** Beneficiary: Save the Children Philippines; I Belong to the Zoo – “Balita” (News); Mayonnaise (ft. I Belong to the Zoo) – "Pahirapan" (Make It Difficult); Moonstar88 – "Naantala" (Halted)	**Michael Pacquiao – "Hate"** Beneficiary: A Home For The Angels Crisis Home For Abandoned Babies Foundation, Inc.; Kiyo – “Nandito Na” (Here It Comes); Konflick (ft. Ron Henley) – "Maskara" (Mask); Pricetagg (ft. Gloc-9 & JP Bacallan) – "Pahina" (Page)
Wishclusive Contemporary R&B Performance of the Year	Wishclusive Contemporary Folk Performance of the Year
**Julie Anne San Jose – "Nobela"** Beneficiary: GIBBS – “No Hearts”; Paolo Sandejas – “Sorry”; the vowels they orbit – “Kiliti” (Tickle)	**Ben&Ben – "Araw-Araw"** (Everyday) Beneficiary: Adarna Group Foundation, Inc.; Clara Benin – "It’s Okay”; Keiko Necesario – "Right Next To You”; syd hartha – "paruparo" (Butterfly)
Wishclusive Collaboration of the Year	Wish Pop Song of the Year
**The Juans, Janine Teñoso – "BTNS (Bakit ‘To Nangyari Sa’tin)"** (Why Is This Happening To Us) Beneficiaries: A Home For The Angels Crisis Home For Abandoned Babies Foundation Inc. and Operation Smile Foundation Philippines, Inc.; Imago, Bente Dos – "Partida" (Advantage); Keiko Necesario, EJ De Perio – "Balang Araw" (Someday); Quest, Rita Daniela – "Di Ko Akalain" (I Never Thought)	**"Love Goes" – SB19** Beneficiary: House of Refuge Foundation, Inc.; “Happy Feelin’” – Rico Blanco; "Safe Zone" – ena mori; "Sirang Plaka" (Broken Record) – The Juans
Wish Ballad Song of the Year	Wish R&B Song of the Year
**"Hanggang Sa Huli" (Until the End) – Moira Dela Torre** Beneficiary: Virlanie Foundation, Inc.; “Di Sapat Pero Tapat” (Not Enough But Faithful) – This Band; "Muling Maramdaman" (Feel Once More) – Dan Ombao; "Pipiliin Pang Maghintay" (Will Choose To Wait Instead) – Noel Cabangon	**"Better" – Julie Anne San Jose** Beneficiary: “Elated” – August Wahh; “Lost” – Inigo Pascual, Moophs; "Safe Place" – Kiana V
Wish Rock/Alternative Song of the Year	Wish Hip-hop Song of the Year
**"Lakas" (Power) – COLN** Beneficiary: Save the Children Philippines; “Huwag Ka Sanang Magagalit” (I Hope You Won't Be Mad) – Unique Salonga; "Sinungaling" (Liar) – Zild; "Sunsets" – Oh, Flamingo!	**"ABAKADA" – Gloc-9 (ft. Mark Beats)** Beneficiary: Philippine Cancer Society; “Iisang Tulay” (One Bridge) – Mike Kosa (ft. Skusta Clee & OG Sacred); "Marikit" (Beautiful) – Juan & Kyle; "Titig" (Stare) – MC Einstein (ft. Flow G, Yuridope & Jekkpot)
Wish Contemporary R&B Song of the Year	Wish Contemporary Folk Song of the Year
**"Teka Lang" (Just Wait) – EMMAN (posthumous)** Beneficiary: Save the Children Philippines; “Gemini Soul” – Jensen Gomez; “Lost” – Paolo Sandejas; “Two Worlds” – Armi Millare	**"Lifetime" – Ben&Ben** Beneficiary: Adarna Group Foundation, Inc.; “Evergreen” – Leanne & Naara; "Kwarto Waltz" (Room Waltz) – Halina; "Wine" – Clara Benin
Wish Song Collaboration of the Year	Best Quarantine-Produced Song
**"Habangbuhay" (Lifetime) – Noel Cabangon, Leanne & Naara** Beneficiary: A Home For The Angels Crisis Home For Abandoned Babies Foundation, Inc.; “I-Boogie Mo Ako Baby” (Do Me Boogie Baby) – The Itchyworms, The CompanY; "Nais Lang Kitang Saktan" (I Just Want to Hurt You) – Mayonnaise, Raymund Marasigan; "Plunder My Heart" – Ely Buendia, Cheats	**"Manalangin" (Pray) – The Juans** Beneficiary: A Home For The Angels Crisis Home For Abandoned Babies Foundation, Inc.; “May Pag-asa” (There is Hope) – Moira Dela Torre, Jason Marvin; "The Silence" – The Itchyworms; "This, Too, Shall Pass" – Rico Blanco

== Special recognition ==
=== Special awards ===
Award	Artists
Wishers’ Choice Award	SB19
KDR Icon of Music and Philanthropy	Arnel Pineda
KDR Icon of Musical Excellence	Rey Valera

=== Wishclusive Elite Circle Awardees ===
Award	Artists
Platinum Wishclusive Elite Circle; 75 million views	O.C. Dawgs – "Pauwi Nako" (I'm Going Home)
Gold Wishclusive Elite Circle; 50 million views	Callalily – "Magbalik”
Gold Wishclusive Elite Circle; 50 million views	Pricetagg (ft. CLR) – "Kontrabida" (Villain)
Silver Wishclusive Elite Circle; 25 million views	Morissette, Darren Espanto – "A Whole New World”
Silver Wishclusive Elite Circle; 25 million views	Magnus Haven – "Imahe" (Image)
Silver Wishclusive Elite Circle; 25 million views	Moira Dela Torre – "Malaya" (Free)
Bronze Wishclusive Elite Circle; 10 million views	Al James – "Pwede Ba" (Can It Be) (Lola Amour cover)
Bronze Wishclusive Elite Circle; 10 million views	CLR, Omar Baliw – "K&B”
Bronze Wishclusive Elite Circle; 10 million views	Michael Pacquiao – "Hate”
Bronze Wishclusive Elite Circle; 10 million views	Skusta Clee – "Zebbiana”

== Multiple awards ==
=== Artists with multiple wins ===
The following artists received three or more awards:

Wins	Artists
3	SB19
3	The Juans
