= Uhaw =

2022 single by Dilaw

Single by Dilaw

from the EP Sansinukob
- Language: Filipino
- Released: November 18, 2022
- Recorded: 2022
- Studio: Open Heaven Recording Studio
- Genre: Ballad; alternative rock
- Length: 4:27
- Label: Warner Music Philippines
- Composers: Johnvie Dela Rosa; Leonard Obero
- Lyricist: Leonard Obero
- Producer: Shadiel Chan

Dilaw singles chronology
| "Kaloy" (2022) | "Uhaw" (2022) | "Uhaw (Tayong Lahat)" (2022) |

"Uhaw" (transl. Thirsty) is a song recorded by Filipino duo Dilaw. It was released on November 18, 2022, by Warner Music Philippines as their third official single. A soft ballad with minimal instrumentation, the song was both written by guitarist Vie Dela Rosa and vocalist Dilaw Obero, with production by Shadiel Chan. Written during a drinking session, the song's message explores all the ranges of thirst for love.

Following the duo's expansion to a six-piece band, the track was re-released under the title "Uhaw (Tayong Lahat)", transforming the song into a blues rock track changing sonically mid-song. The version became the band's mainstream breakthrough, breaking the record in Spotify Philippines for the biggest single-day streams for an OPM song and charting at number one in Billboard Philippines Songs for ten consecutive weeks.

The track has become Dilaw's signature song, being performed multiple times in live performances, including Wish 107.5 and Showtime Online Ü. The band also performed the song with British rock band Coldplay during the latter's concert at the Philippine Arena on January 20, 2024.

== Background ==
=== Original version ===
"Uhaw" was composed by Dilaw Obero and Vie Dela Rosa during a drinking session, starting with a basic two chord progression. Obero explained, "We basically had one thing in mind: that feeling one gets when you long for someone — which we felt could best be described in one word, which is ‘uhaw’." On recording the track, the duo opted to use minimal instruments to showcase its lyricism, a large contrast from their previous rap-infused alternative rock singles "3019" and "Kaloy". "When it came to recording the song, we wanted to keep it as simple as possible, because the goal was to let the meaning shine — We wanted it to be about the message rather than about everything else happening in the music," Obero added.

=== 'Tayong Lahat' version ===
"Uhaw (Tayong Lahat)"

Single by Dilaw

from the EP Sansinukob
- Language: Filipino
- Released: December 16, 2022
- Recorded: 2022
- Studio: Open Heaven Recording Studio
- Genre: Indie rock; alternative rock; blues rock
- Length: 4:01
- Label: Warner Music Philippines
- Composers: Johnvie Dela Rosa; Leonard Obero
- Producer: Shadiel Chan

Dilaw singles chronology
| "Uhaw" (2022) | "Uhaw (Tayong Lahat)" (2022) | "Sansinukob" (2023) |

Music video
- "'Uhaw (Tayong Lahat)'" on YouTube

With the demanding range for achieving their sound live, Obero and Vie recruited the helps of Wayne Dela Rosa, Leon Karlos Altomonte, En Altomonte, and Tóbi Samson to perform as a six-piece band live during their promotions under the suggestion of producer Shadiel Chan. Together, the Altomonte siblings, Dela Rosa brothers, Obero, and Samson agreed to expand Dilaw into an indie sextet permanently. To launch their band's expansion, Dilaw re-released the song with the title "Uhaw (Tayong Lahat)" on December 16, converting the ballad into a sped-up blues rock track with a grand climax. Vie commented on how they considered the transition "open" for the re-release: "We had everyone contribute their own flair and input, and we were simply following where the song would take us, and by the time we finished, we were more than happy with how it sounded and felt to us.”

== Composition ==
"Uhaw" is described as a ballad with sonic layers and vocal stylings. The song is in the key of B♭ major, playing at 124 bpm with a running time of 4 minutes and 26 seconds.

The lyrics were written by Obero. In the song's chorus, the titular word "uhaw" is repeatedly sung. Throughout the song, descriptive words related to water stressed the thirst for one's love, including ulan, giniginaw, and nalulunod.

== Critical reception ==
Both versions of "Uhaw" received favorable reviews from music critics, with many complimenting the song as a standout OPM track in recent times. Baby A. Gil of The Philippine Star highlighted the genre shift, stating: "Dilaw could have stayed with the genre and solidified their reputation as musicians with a voice for the oppressed, but then, "Uhaw" came along. And once again the magic happened, that age-old mystery that keeps repeating itself but still remains unsolved, a hit song was born." Khyne Palumar of NME applauded the ballad as "sharply detailed" and "practically unmissable". She lauded the singer's vocal techniques: "Obero gets to flaunt his elastic vocal range, belting and trilling in both versions of ‘Uhaw’." Kristine Claire Paler of Wish 107.5 commended both versions' inclusion to the EP Sansinukob, finding the ballad as "raw and honest" while the revamped version as "ending the EP strong". Rafael Bautista of Nylon Manila called the track as "the perfect kind of love song that’s easy on the ears and heavy on the heart." Melissa Corpus of LA Music Review gave the song five stars, summarizing the song as "nostalgic and truly remarkable", with "chill-pop relaxing vibes that you can listen to any time of the day." Mario Limos of Spin.ph praised the song's lyrics, layering, and vocals, declaring that "Dilaw is a testament that regional talents deserve the global spotlight."

== Commercial performance ==
Following its inclusion in local playlists, "Uhaw (Tayong Lahat)" peaked at number one on Spotify Viral Hits Philippines on February 23, two months after its release. The track surged to number 6 at the Viral Songs Global chart on March 8, achieving a peak of number 4 on the following days after gaining traction in the United States, Indonesia, and Australia. On March 16, the song made its debut at the Spotify Top 50 – Philippines chart at number 32 with 1,187,553 weekly streams. The song climbed to number 6 the following week before peaking at number one on the chart dated March 30 with 3,976,673 weekly streams. On April 1, "Uhaw (Tayong Lahat)" received 694,337 daily streams, breaking the biggest single-day streams for an OPM song in Spotify Philippines previously held by "Pasilyo" by SunKissed Lola. The song eclipsed its record with 720,951 streams on the following day, becoming the first local song to break the 700K mark. It continued to outdo its peaks, reaching its highest number of streams on April 6 with 4,895,813 weekly streams and on April 11 with 747,093 daily streams. Following its inclusion in the playlists Hot Hits Philippines, Tatak Pinoy, and OPM Rising, it has remained at number one on Spotify Philippines for four consecutive weeks, with 23 million plays as of April 2023. Overseas, the song reached number 23 at the daily chart of Spotify UAE.

On Billboard Philippines Songs, both combined versions of "Uhaw" entered at number twenty-four on March 25, 2023. The song rose 16 spots to number eight the following week before reaching number one on its third week on April 8, making Dilaw the second OPM band to top the chart after SunKissed Lola. The track has remained at the summit for ten consecutive weeks, becoming the second longest-running number-one single in the chart after "Pano" by Zack Tabudlo. "Uhaw" ended 2023 as the year's number-one song on Philippine Songs.

The song has also topped the Philippine charts of YouTube and Apple Music.

== Music video ==
A music video directed by Via Cadiente featuring the band members hanging out in an apartment was released to YouTube on March 15, accumulating 11 million views as of April 2023.

== Credits and personnel ==
Adapted from the single's lyric video notes.

Dilaw

- Dilaw Obero – lead vocals, songwriter, composer
- Vie Dela Rosa – guitar, composer
- Leon Karlos Altomonte – guitar
- Tobi Samson – drums
- En Altomonte – synths

Additional personnel

- Shadiel Chan – producer, mixing
- Jan Aries Agadier Fuertez – mastering engineer
- Jonathan Jabez Lopez – bass
- Jan Danielle Gurion – piano

== Charts ==
=== Weekly chart ===
Weekly chart performance for "Uhaw"
| Chart (2023) | Peak position |
|---|---|
| Philippines (Billboard) | 1 |
| Philippines (Top Philippine Songs) | 58 |

=== Year-end chart ===
2023 year-end chart performance for "Uhaw"
| Chart (2023) | Position |
|---|---|
| Philippines (Billboard) | 1 |

2024 year-end chart performance for "Uhaw"
| Chart (2024) | Position |
|---|---|
| Philippines (Philippines Hot 100) | 74 |

== Release history ==
Release history and formats for "Uhaw"
| Region | Date | Format | Version | Label(s) | Ref. |
|---|---|---|---|---|---|
| Worldwide | November 18, 2022 | Digital download; streaming | Original | Warner Music Philippines | |
| Worldwide | December 16, 2023 | Digital download; streaming | 'Tayong Lahat' version | Warner Music Philippines | |
| Worldwide | January 13, 2023 | Digital download; streaming | 3-track EP | Warner Music Philippines | |
