= International State College of the Philippines =

Satirical Facebook page of a real university system based in the Philippines

- International State College of the Philippines logo
- Created by: Niño Ged
- Genre: Satire, parody

In-universe information
- Other names: ISCP; Kolehiyo Internasyonal Pambansa ng Pilipinas
- Founded: 2022 (Note: Facebook page created on July 31, 2022)
- Location: Philippines ("Main", Biringan, Tondo, Visayas, etc.) and "Sun and Moon", among many other "campuses" within the Earth, the Solar System, the Milky Way, and the universe or the multiverse
- Key people: Niño Ged Alajid (Founder); Kim Atienza (Dean of the College of Education)
- Website: International State College of the Philippines on Facebook; Official website
- Motto: Filipinos S[t]ultus Es Satura [sic] (Latin for: Filipinos are full of stupidity)
- Hymn: Orchestral version of "Sun and Moon" by Anees
- Athletic nickname: ISCP Blue Aspins

The International State College of the Philippines (ISCP) is a satirical and parodic Facebook page of a fictitious "international, extraterrestrial, and mythical university system" of the same name. It is a fictional institution created by Niño Ged, which trended in the Philippines, the ISCP is known for its witty "course offerings" and online publicity materials that make it look like a legitimate higher education institution. The "university" is the home of the (nonexistent) Blue Aspins. Its adopted school hymn is the orchestral version of "Sun and Moon" by Anees.

Also having its own Facebook group, the university's "student council" is called Supreme E-Youth (Electronic Youth) Government, wherein "e-youth" is a wordplay on the Cebuano expletive iyot, which means "to fuck".

== Content ==
The satirical page features random personalities as "professors", "students", or "alumni". One of them is Filipino television host and weather forecaster Kim Atienza, who was "appointed" as the "dean of the College of Education". Atienza initially dismissed his association to the satirical "university" he first thought was a real institution of higher learning, and categorized it as a "scam" on August 6, 2022. Atienza, eventually, caught on to the trend and thanked ISCP for the "honor" of serving as its supposed educator. On his Twitter account, Atienza finally "accepted" the "appointment as Dean of Education", where he "required all students" to "submit" a "10-word reaction paper" on The Philippine Star article he "quote-tweeted".

Other Filipino personalities who have joined the trend are popular content creator Macoy Dubs, who called himself a "student"; Senator JV Ejercito, who expressed his intent to "apply" after "congratulating" Macoy Dubs; singer Ace Banzuelo who projected to "run" for "presidency of the College of Arts and Sciences Student Council"; P3PWD representative and former election commissioner Rowena Guanzon, who was "hired" as a "law professor"; and stand-up comedian James Caraan, who joked he would "teach" students of "BS Marketing Major in Events Management".

Porn star Lexi Lore, through a video posted on the satirical page, endorsed the "university", as she teasingly shakes her breasts.

== Controversies ==
Local artist Toni Panagu called the attention of the Facebook page administrators for allegedly using the ISCP trend to promote QuickWrite, a startup of recent high school graduates that provide writing services, such as academic works for students. Panagu condemned the startup as a form of academic dishonesty. QuickWrite eventually disaffiliated from ISCP.

Less than a month after the page went viral, the page's creator, Niño Ged, emphasized that he and the ISCP are apolitical and non-partisan in a now-deleted Facebook post. The post drew controversy from many Filipinos on social media, with many students claiming that they are dropping out of school. In response, the page issued a public apology statement from Niño Ged, reiterating the page's purpose as a satirical parody of educational institutions to expose the poor state of the Philippine education system while providing a space for free-flowing discourse across different political views, and apologizing for the misconceptions drawn from his initial statement.

Niño Ged also drew controversy on social media for crying foul over volunteer content creators selling unofficial merchandise bearing the ISCP name and branding, leading to social media users accusing him of trying to "milk" the community's efforts.
