= Mahika =

2022 single by Adie and Janine Berdin

Single by Adie and Janine Berdin

from the album Senaryo
- Language: Tagalog
- English title: Magic
- Released: May 11, 2022
- Genre: Ballad; contemporary pop
- Length: 3:14
- Label: O/C Records
- Composers: Adie Garcia; Janine Berdin
- Producer: Adie

Adie singles chronology
"You'll Be Safe Here" (2022)	"Mahika" (2022)	"Kabado" (2022)

Janine Berdin singles chronology
"Leni Laban! (with Various Artists)" (2022)	"Mahika" (2022)	"Pagod Na" (2022)

Music video
- "Mahika" on YouTube

"Mahika" (lit. 'Magic') is a song composed and performed by the Filipino singers Adie and Janine Berdin. It was released as a single on May 11, 2022, by O/C Records. Produced by Adie, "Mahika" is an acoustic ballad and contemporary pop track that describes a playful and unpredictable piece, evoked by the sensation of butterflies upon encountering magical moments. The track was featured as the theme song for the 2023 romance drama film The Cheating Game. Additionally, the song was later included in Adie's debut studio album Senaryo.

"Mahika" peaked at number one on Billboard's Philippines Songs for two weeks, and was Adie's and Berdin's first number-one song on the chart. It is also the first duet to reach the summit and made Berdin the first Filipina to have a chart-topping song. The track has become the chart's longest charting song at 70 weeks, ending its run on December 16, 2023. After its newly relaunched Billboard Philippines Hot 100 and Top Philippine Songs, it debuted at number 39 and number 22, respectively.

== Background and release ==
"Mahika" was the first song collaboration between Adie and Janine Berdin. Both young artists had already been doing very well in their solo careers before they composed and performed the song. The song was released on May 11, 2022.

Adie released his album on December 16, 2023, titled Senaryo, and has thirteen tracks, including "Mahika".

== Composition ==
The song was written by Adrian Garcia and Janine Berdin, and produced by Adie. "Mahika" is an acoustic ballad and contemporary pop track that describes a playful and unpredictable piece, evoked by the sensation of butterflies upon encountering magical moments. The song's floating-in-air quality is attributed to its theme and Adie's buoyant vocal quality, and the combination of Adie's and Janine Berdin's voices is commendable for its effectiveness.

The lyrics "Nagbabadya ang hangin na nakapalibot sa ‘kin/Tila merong pahiwatig ako’y nananabik" (lit. 'The air around me is telling me/It seems like there's a hint that I'm longing') and "Di naman napilitan kusa na lang naramdaman/Ang di inaasahang pag-ugnay ng kalawakan" (lit. 'It wasn't forced, it was felt spontaneously/The unexpected connection of the universe') highlighted that it reflects the sentiments of young people today, often used to express their feelings to their crushes.

== Music video ==
Official visualizer of "Mahika".

O/C Records has released two music videos for the song. The first video was released on May 21, 2022. While the second video was released on August 6, 2022, and was directed by Kris Cazin and features Audrei Garcia, Adie's brother and Chloe Anne Reyes.

== Live performances ==
Adie and Berdin performed "Mahika", alongside the Filipino singer-songwriters Ace Banzuelo and Moira Dela Torre, and also sang Banzulo's song "Muli" during an episode of ASAP Natin 'To on October 16, 2022. The duo also performed the track live on Wish 107.5 and a video of it was released to YouTube, which has 24 million views as of August 2025.

Julie Anne San Jose and Rayver Cruz performed "Mahika" during a JulieVerse concert on November 26, 2022.

== Reception ==
Tara Aquino of Rolling Stone listed "Mahika" as one of the songs to Keep on Your RADAR. She described that the song is a perfect example of the acoustic ballads that Filipino musicians do best. She also highlighted that "Mahika" is a cinematic story that characterized by mixed signals and emotions.

Commercially, "Mahika" was notably on the number one spot for the last months of 2022 on Billboard Philippines Songs. The track has become the chart's longest charting song at 70 weeks, ending its run on December 16, 2023. For the 2022 and 2023 Billboard Philippines Songs year-end chart, it peaked at number six. After its newly relaunched Billboard Top Philippine Songs, it debuted at number 22 on July 6, 2024. It also debuted at number 39 and peaked at number 26 on the Philippines Hot 100.

== Listicles ==
Publisher	Year	Listicle	Placement	Ref.
Rolling Stone	2022	Be Sure to Keep These Songs on Your RADAR	Placed	

== Credits and personnel ==
Credits are adapted from Apple Music.

- Adie – vocals, producer
- Janine Berdin – vocals, songwriter
- Adrian Garcia – producer
- Franz Sacro – arranger

== Charts ==
=== Weekly chart ===
2022–2023 weekly chart performance for "Mahika"
Chart (2022–2023)	Peak position
Philippines (Billboard)	1

2024 weekly chart performance for "Mahika"
Chart (2024)	Peak position
Philippines Hot 100 (Billboard Philippines)	26
Philippines (Top Philippine Songs)	19

=== Year-end chart ===
2022 year-end chart performance for "Mahika"2023 year-end chart performance for "Mahika"
Chart (2022)	Position
Philippines (Billboard)	6
Chart (2023)	Position
Philippines (Billboard)	6

== Awards and nominations ==
Year	Awards ceremony	Award	Results	Refs
2023	8th Wish Music Awards	Wish Song Collaboration of the Year	Won	
2023	4th VP Choice Awards	OPM Song of the Year	Won	
2024	15th PMPC Star Awards for Music	Collaboration of the Year	Won	
