= Lab Songs ng mga Tanga =

2025 studio album by Janine Berdin

Studio album by Janine Berdin
- Released: September 26, 2025
- Recorded: 2023–2025
- Genres: Alternative rock; pop-punk; indie; OPM
- Length: 36:00
- Label: Island
- Producers: Janine Berdin; JGREG; Emil Dela Rosa; Xergio Ramos; Luke Casanova; Kirk Basilio

Janine Berdin chronology
WTF I Actually Wrote These Songs (2022)	Lab Songs ng mga Tanga (2025)

Alternative cover
- More Lab Songs ng mga Tanga edition cover

Singles from Lab Songs ng mga Tanga
- 1. "Sitwasyonship" Released: September 29, 2023; 2. "Pamamaalam" Released: November 15, 2024; 3. "Ayos Lang" Released: March 28, 2025; 4. "Tayo lang (may alam)" Released: June 20, 2025; 5. "Hayup Ka" Released: October 10, 2025; 6. "Antoxic" Released: March 13, 2026; 7. "What If I Miss You for the Rest of My Life?" Released: June 10, 2026

Singles from More Lab Songs ng mga Tanga (Deluxe edition)
- 1. "Friendship Over" Released: September 9, 2026

Lab Songs Ng Mga Tanga (stylized in all lowercase; lit. Love Songs for Fools) is the debut studio album by Filipino singer-songwriter Janine Berdin. Released on September 26, 2025, under Island Records Philippines, it marks Berdin's first full-length album since entering the music industry after winning the second season of Tawag ng Tanghalan in 2018.

The album represents a departure from her earlier traditional pop ballads, shifting toward alternative rock, pop-punk, and hugot rock.

== Background and themes ==
Berdin announced the album during a press conference on September 14, 2025. According to Berdin, the album serves as an unfiltered, honest compilation of stories exploring toxic relationships, situationships, and heartbreak, stating she wanted to create music that functioned like a "best friend" for people embarrassed to share their relationship struggles with others.

Musically, critics noted that the album channels the grit and raw energy of early-2000s OPM icons like Yeng Constantino, Kitchie Nadal, and Barbie Almalbis.

== Promotion and singles ==
The album was preceded by several singles. The track "Sitwasyonship" was released in 2023 and became a viral hit. In 2025, Berdin released "Ayos Lang" and "Tayo Lang (May Alam)" featuring Illest Morena and Fana, the latter achieving over a million views on its music video within a month. On September 15, 2025, "Hayup Ka" was released as the lead promotional single alongside the formal album announcement. She's also collaborated with Ruffa Mae Quinto for the single's music video.

Following its release, the track "What if I miss you for the rest of my life?" entered the Spotify Viral Top 50 Philippines chart. By early 2026, the album had accumulated over 25 million streams.

== Track listing ==
All tracks are written by Janine Berdin, except where noted.

Lab Songs ng mga Tanga track listing
No.	Title	Writer(s)	Length
1.	"Second Child (Intro)"	Janine Berdin	1:55
2.	"Sitwasyonship"		3:48
3.	"Ayos Lang"		3:13
4.	"Pretty Pretty Bird"		2:30
5.	"Antoxic"		4:10
6.	"Hayup Ka"		3:00
7.	"Miskom"		3:28
8.	"Pamamaalam"		3:46
9.	"What If I Miss You for the Rest of My Life?"		3:06
10.	"Hedonistic Slut"		3:40
11.	"Tayo Lang (May Alam)" (bonus track; featuring Illest Morena and Fana)		3:28
Total length:			36:00

More Lab Songs ng mga Tanga (Deluxe Edition)
No.	Title	Writer(s)	Length
12.	"Promise"	Berdin	3:57
13.	"Uneasy"	Berdin	3:54
14.	"Friendship Over"	Berdin	4:51
15.	"Mirisi"	Berdin	4:32
Total length:			53:14

== Release history ==
List of release dates
Region	Date	Format(s)	Edition(s)	Label	Ref.
Various	September 26, 2025	Digital download; streaming	Standard	Island Records	
Various	July 30, 2026	Digital download; streaming	Deluxe Edition	Island Records	
