= Dilaw (band) =

Filipino rock band

- Origin: Baguio, Philippines
- Genres: Indie rock; alternative rock; alternative hip-hop
- Years active: 2021–present
- Label: Warner Music Philippines
- Members: Dilaw Obero; Vie Dela Rosa; Leon Karlos Altomonte; Wayne Dela Rosa; En Altomonte; Tóbi Samson

Dilaw is a Filipino rock band formed in Baguio, Benguet in 2021. Originally an alternative hip-hop duo between singer-songwriter Dilaw Obero and guitarist-instrumentalist Vie Dela Rosa, the group expanded into a full indie rock collective with the addition of Wayne Dela Rosa (bass guitar), Leon Karlos (guitar), En Altomonte (keyboards, synths), and Tóbi Samson (drums).

After busking and performing independently in their first year, the duo signed to Warner Music Philippines and released the singles "3019" and "Kaloy" to warm response among the Filipino indie scene. The band achieved commercial breakthrough with the single "Uhaw (Tayong Lahat)", gaining the record in Spotify Philippines for the biggest single-day streams for an OPM song and topping Billboard Philippines Songs for three consecutive weeks.

Following its success, they released their debut extended play Sansinukob (2023) and re-recorded the duo's independently released track "Janice". Dilaw was included on the NME 100 as one of the most essential emerging artists worldwide in 2023.

== History ==
Independent singer-rapper Leonard "Dilaw" Obero started writing poems and songs in 2016, posting some of them online through social media. Performing as a soloist since high school and learning music theory overseas, Vie Dela Rosa migrated back to the Philippines in 2019 after previously working in Shanghai, China, meeting with his brother Wayne for his dog's birthday. During the party, Vie reunited with Wayne's bestfriend Obero, conversing on being collaborators after initially misjudging Obero as a jejemon and being impressed with his songwriting abilities. Vie and Obero isolated themselves from the party, penning a draft of their first written track, "Sansinukob". In the midst of the COVID-19 pandemic, the duo continued to work on songs online.

=== 2021–2022: Debut as duo ===
On January 15, 2021, Obero and Vie officially announced the project Dilaw to different social media platforms. The duo, called after Obero's pseudonym, derived their name from the Tagalog phrase 'di ilaw sa gabing mapanglaw, a variation of the lyrics from the classic kundiman "O Ilaw" by Ruben Tagalog. Promoting themselves through busking around Baguio City, the duo independently released the track "Janice" to streaming platforms on July 1. On the episodes dated December 20, 21 and 27 of Sing Galing on TV5, Obero covered the songs "Till Death Do Us Part" by White Lion, "Himig ng Pag-Ibig" by Asin, "A Perfect Christmas" by Jose Mari Chan, "Lintik" by Brownman Revival, and "Top of The World" by The Carpenters.

On April 29, 2022, Dilaw debuted on music streaming platforms with their first official single "3019", in reference to Republic Act 3019, also known as the Anti-Graft and Corrupt Practices Act. Released through Warner Music Philippines in anticipation of the 2022 Philippine presidential elections, it is an alternative hip-hop track with jazz rock elements that narrate the effects of corruption and injustice on government. The track initiated as the first collaboration between Dilaw and producer Shadiel Chan. The music video to "3019" directed by BJ Tangco premiered on May 13 at Saguijo Bar, Makati City, followed by the first live performance of the track with special guests Leanne & Naara and Jensen Gomez.

On June 24, the duo released their second single "Kaloy", a rap-infused folk and blues rock song about the daily musings of regular folks and a commentary on the social divide. The duo alluded that the track was about the working class, "the roles they play and their purpose – no matter how big or small – and how it all affects the bigger picture." Dilaw was one of the opening acts for Fête de la Musique PH 2022 on June 25, performing a 30-minute set at Intramuros, Manila. A music video for "Kaloy" directed by Dean Colin Marcial was uploaded to YouTube on July 15, holding its release show at Social House, Makati City with Autotelic. A tribute to the worker class of Baguio City, the video featured the indigenous film director Kidlat Tahimik shouting on a megaphone in public to positive reactions among the independent scene. Regarding his rare appearance for the video, Tahimik addressed: "This matters to me because we can no longer be copycats of Western music, and I believe Dilaw is speaking, singing, performing from their dwende." Dilaw's performance of "Kaloy" on MYX Live was uploaded on November 8 to YouTube.

The duo's third single "Uhaw", a soft romantic ballad with lyricism on the insatiable thirst for love, was published on November 18. Written during a drinking session, the act commented that the track explored "the blissful upsides to the darkest despair of love, giving you a journey and experiencing love like it was your first time." The track gained rounds online after it peaked at number two on the Spotify Viral 50 – Philippines chart at the end of the year.

=== 2022–present: Expansion and Sansinukob ===
With the demanding range for achieving their sound live, Obero and Vie recruited the helps of Wayne, Leon Karlos Altomonte, and Tóbi Samson to perform as a five-piece band live during their promotions under the suggestion of Chan. Originally a singer, Wayne devoted time in learning the bass guitar to assist the duo. After hearing the final recording of "Sansinukob", Karlos expressed interest on joining the project, serving as a lead guitarist for their bar gigs: "It blew me away really, because I wasn't expecting the songs to sound like that." Samson, a Nigerian expatriate, became a resident drummer for Open Heaven Recording Studio with Chan since 2021, performing drums for local acts including Arthur Miguel and Cup of Joe. En Altomonte was added last to the lineup, considered by Chan as Dilaw's completing member: "The band needed someone to learn how to do the programming for live and look for all of the electronic elements, how to do it live... En just makes it work, and it's like magic when you watch them live." Together, the Altomonte siblings, Dela Rosa brothers, Obero, and Samson agreed to expand Dilaw into an indie sextet permanently. To launch their band's expansion, Dilaw re-released their latest single with the title "Uhaw (Tayong Lahat)" on December 16, converting the ballad into a sped-up blues rock track with a grand climax. Vie commented on how they considered the transition "open" for the re-release: "We had everyone contribute their own flair and input, and we were simply following where the song would take us, and by the time we finished, we were more than happy with how it sounded and felt to us."

On January 6, 2023, the group was inducted into the NME 100 as an emerging act to watch out for. Author Surej Singh wrote, "Refusing to bound themselves to any one genre, Dilaw have made it their modus operandi to switch up their sound with every release. Expect the unexpected from the Filipino duo as they deliver swanky jazz jams, soaring rock choruses, and everything in between." During their breaks from Dilaw, Vie and Wayne occasionally performed as a sub-unit titled Sideline, with Vie on guitar and Wayne as a vocalist. Vie referred to the sub-unit as their training ground, saying: "If we want to practice with an audience and we have pieces of R&B that we want to play because Wayne also wanted to sing, we get to develop it because it's out there." Dilaw performed at the pre-event concert of UP Fair on February 10.

Following its inclusion in local playlists, "Uhaw (Tayong Lahat)" peaked at number one on Spotify Viral Hits Philippines on February 23, two months after its release. The track surged to number 6 at the Viral Songs Global chart on March 8, achieving its number 4 peak on the following days after gaining traction in the United States, Indonesia, and Australia. The song climbed to number one on the Spotify Top 50 – Philippines chart dated March 30 with 3,976,673 weekly streams. On April 1, "Uhaw (Tayong Lahat)" received 694,337 daily streams, breaking the biggest single-day streams for an OPM song in Spotify Philippines. It became the first local song to break the 700K mark on April 1, reaching its highest number of streams on April 6 with 4,895,813 weekly streams and on April 11 with 747,093 daily streams. It has remained at number one on Spotify Philippines for four consecutive weeks, with 23 million plays as of April 2023. On Billboard Philippines Songs, both combined versions of "Uhaw" reached number one on the week ending on April 8, staying at the summit for three consecutive weeks and making Dilaw the second OPM band to top the chart. The song has also topped the Philippine charts of YouTube and Apple Music. A music video directed by Via Cadiente featuring the band members hanging out in an apartment was released to YouTube on March 15, accumulating 11 million views as of April 2023.

Dilaw officially released their debut extended play Sansinukob on March 24, consisting of the band's four previously released songs, along with two new tracks "Sansinukob" and "Maskara". Obero described the EP as "a collection of songs that speaks about the universal experience and struggles people face – and seeks ways to help people understand themselves and the world better." To promote the play, the title track was released as the band's promotional single. The band also attended Showtime Online Ü and performed "Uhaw (Tayong Lahat)" on their release day.

In celebration of their commercial success, Dilaw conducted a roadshow on April 2, 2023, entitled Thirst Giving Party at Session Road, Baguio. On April 21, the group uploaded a re-recorded version of their previous independently released track "Janice" to streaming platforms with an accompanying lyric video directed by Cadiente. The band performed at the "We Play Here" concert on April 27 in celebration of the 30th anniversary of Warner Music Philippines at SM Aura, Taguig City.

On January 20, 2024, British rock band Coldplay invited Dilaw on stage during the Music of the Spheres World Tour at the Philippine Arena. Coldplay frontman Chris Martin asked the Filipino band to perform their song "Uhaw", with the British singer joining on guitar.

== Artistry and influences ==
Music outlets described the duo's sound as indie rock and alternative, with core elements of blues and hip-hop. Obero cited the Filipino jazz rock band Radioactive Sago Project, as well as rappers MF Doom, Eminem, and Loonie as primary influences for their debut. Vie mentioned John Mayer, Jimi Hendrix, Stevie Ray Vaughan, and Prince as additional musical influences for his instrumentation. After the band's expansion, Samson affirmed that their new rock sound drew from different genres, ranging from blues, hard rock, metal, reggae, and funk. The Dela Rosa brothers cemented R&B as an integral genre to their inputs as instrumentalists.

Chan appreciated the challenges on producing Dilaw's sound, highlighting their signature tempo and time signature changes mid-song and adding different elements and arrangements to complete a track. Despite Obero being the frontman, Chan pointed Vie as the leader behind the band's musical direction and key to the band's expansion into a six-piece. About their chemistry, Karlos identified their familial relationships as a primary factor: "You have two siblings there. Two batches of siblings in the band who have known each other their whole lives and know all the intricacies of their personalities. So the way that locks in onstage, [and] I'm phrasing the words of my girlfriend here... Watching the band is an experience." The group is also known for their vibrant, colorful fashion and stage persona, inclusive of thrift clothing, chill personality, and the usage of the color yellow. Regarding their identity, Altomonte claimed, "I see extremely weird characters that are surprisingly good at music. But you know, that's what we go for."

In prior discussion with the band, Obero finalized their main purpose, stating how Dilaw intends to "make songs that will gradually make the surroundings of the listeners darker until they can see in the dark."

== Band members ==
=== Current members ===
- Leonard "Dilaw" Obero – lead vocals, songwriter (2021–present)
- Johnvie "Vie" Dela Rosa Viloria – rhythm guitar, backing vocals (2021–present)
- Leon Karlos Altomonte – lead guitar, backing guitar (2022–present)
- Wayne Dela Rosa – bass guitar, backing vocals (2022–present)
- Aeneas "En" Altomonte – keyboards, synths (2022–present)
- Olúwatóbilóba "Tóbi" Samson Omójolà – drums (2022–present)

== Discography ==
=== EP ===
List of extended plays, with release date and label shown
Title	Details
Sansinukob	Released: March 24, 2022; Label: Warner Music Philippines; Format: digital download, streaming

=== Singles ===
List of singles, with selected chart positions, and showing year released as single
Title	Year	Peak chart positions	Album
Title	Year	PHL Songs	Album
"3019"	2022	—	Non-album singles
"Kaloy"	2022	—	Non-album singles
"Uhaw"	2022	1	Non-album singles
"Sansinukob"	2023	—	Non-album singles
"Orasa"	2023	—	Non-album singles
"Janice"	2023	—	Non-album singles
"Chinelas"	2023	—	Non-album singles
"Sa Kahapon"	2024	—	Non-album singles
"Nilalang"	2024	—	Non-album singles
"YIEE"	2024	—	Non-album singles
"Mahal"	2025		Non-album singles
"Flying Kiss"	2025		Non-album singles
"Black N' White"	2025	—	Non-album singles
