= Janine Berdin =

Filipino singer and songwriter (born 2002)

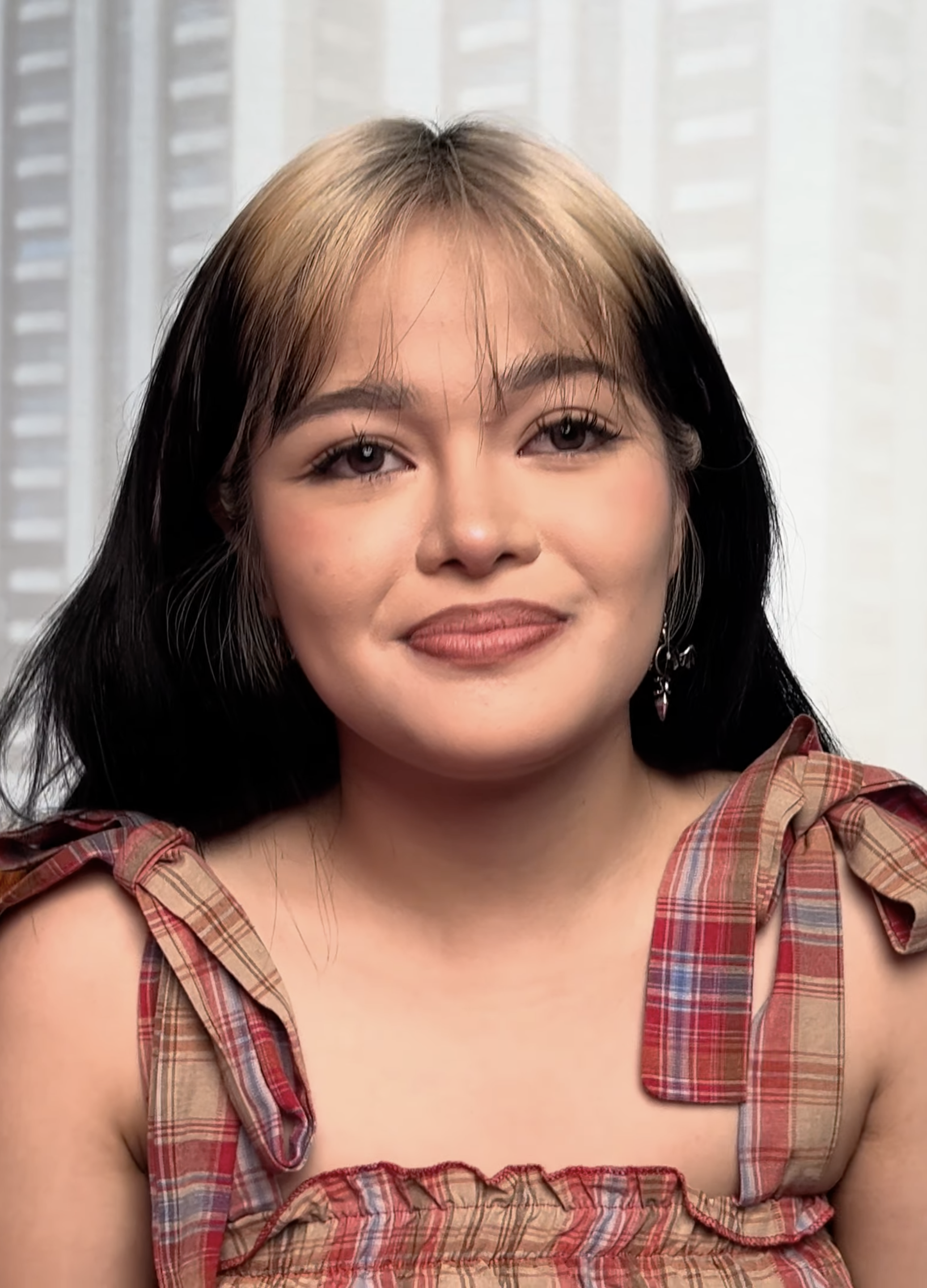
- Berdin in July 2024

Background information
- Born: Patricia Janine Dusaran Berdin; January 28, 2002 (age 24); Lapu-Lapu City, Cebu, Philippines
- Occupations: Singer; songwriter
- Musical career
- Genres: Pop; pop rock; alternative rock
- Instruments: Vocals; ukulele; guitar
- Years active: 2011–present
- Labels: Star Magic (2018–2024); Island Records Philippines (2024–present)

Patricia Janine Dusaran Berdin (born January 28, 2002) is a Filipino singer and songwriter. She rose to fame when she won the second season of the Tawag ng Tanghalan segment on It's Showtime (2017–2018).

Berdin began her career as a child actress after appearing in Star Circle Quest: Search for the Next Kiddie Superstars (2010), she appeared in several television series on ABS-CBN after her stint on the contest and prior to her singing career. After a five-year hiatus to focus on her studies, she joined Tawag ng Tanghalan in 2017 and won the competition. She subsequently signed with Star Magic.

Her 2022 single "Mahika" with Adie reached No. 1 on the Billboard's Philippines Songs chart. Up until October 2023, "Mahika" became the longest-charting track on the Billboard's Philippines Songs chart at 69 weeks. Her debut EP "WTF I actually wrote these songs" was released in 2022. She was previously a regular on the variety show ASAP Natin 'To, until her transition to an independent artist.

Her 2023 single "Sitwasyonship" was her first self-composed release as an independent artist. This was followed by the release of "Alas Dos Na!!!" on May 10, 2024, as the debut single for her new label, Island Records Philippines.

On May 18, 2026, Berdin returned to the Wish 107.5 bus to perform a live version of her self-composed song "What If I Miss You for the Rest of My Life?", later going viral and drawing attention from international artists such as Demi Lovato, SZA, Doechii, and Lauren Jauregui.

== Career ==
Berdin first appeared on ABS-CBN, where she competed in the fourth season of Star Circle Quest: Search for the Next Kiddie Superstars. Berdin finished as the 4th female semi-finalist.

After the contest she was endorsed to ABS-CBN's Star Magic to be one of their talents. She also participated in some Star Magic activities including Star Magic Games 2012 and the ABS-CBN 2012 Christmas Station ID.

Berdin attempted to audition for The Voice Kids, but was not chosen to appear in the show. In 2017, she also tried to audition for the first season of Tawag ng Tanghalan, but was still not accepted. She auditioned again during the following season and received the call to compete for the fourth quarter of the season.

=== Tawag ng Tanghalan: Season 2 ===
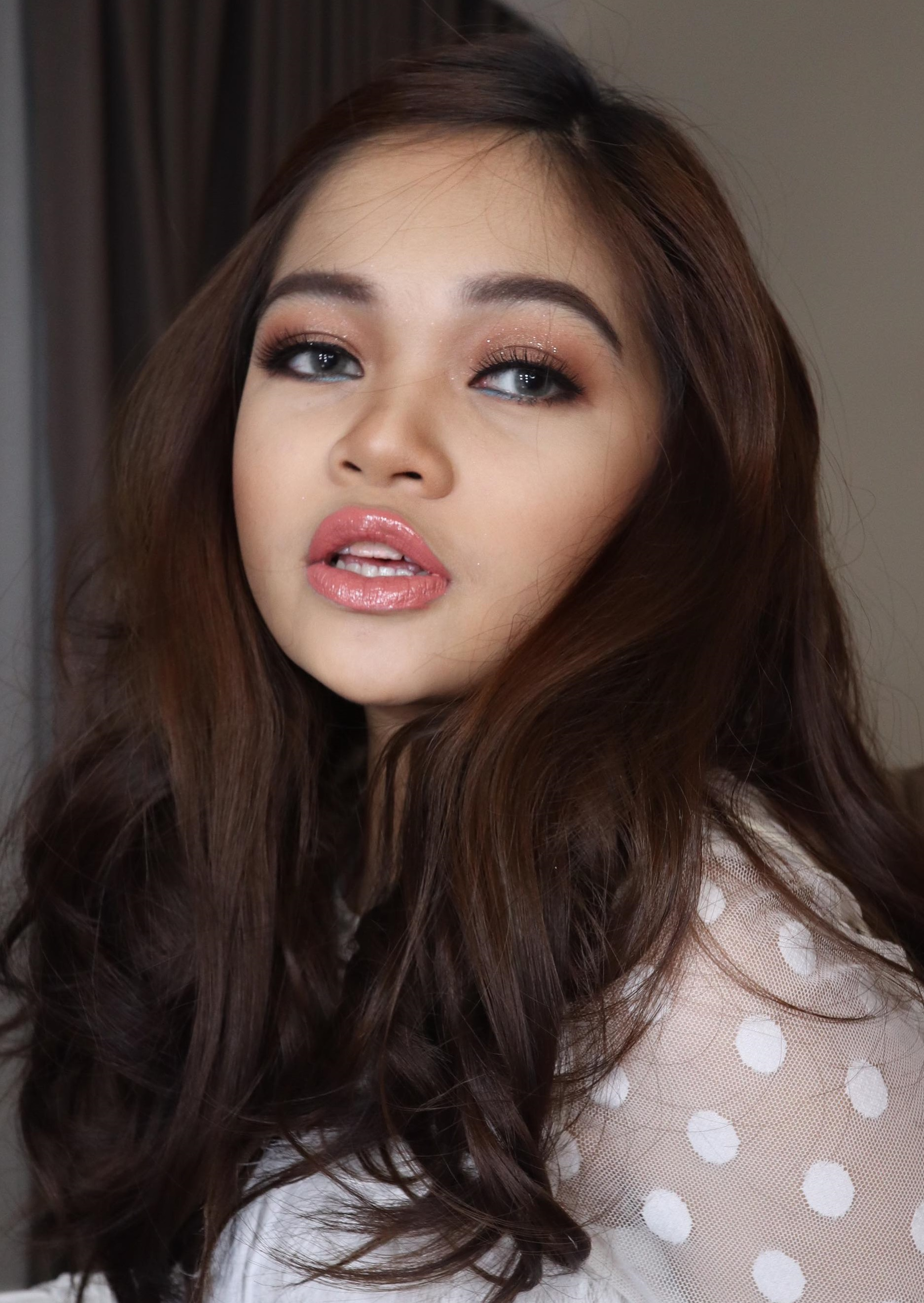
Berdin in 2019

On January 24, 2018, Janine participated in the Season 2, Quarter IV of Tawag ng Tanghalan on It's Showtime, a singing competition on ABS-CBN. She was introduced as a Singing Young military trainee and was dubbed as the "Cadets My Girl ng Cebu". On her first performance, she sang her rendition of Magasin by Eraserheads, where she emerged as the daily winner.

Songs Performed by Janine Berdin: Daily rounds (Tawag ng Tanghalan Season 2, Quarter IV)
Performance Date	Song Performed	Original Artist	Score (%)	Result
January 24, 2018	Magasin	Eraserheads	91.4	Won (as daily winner)
January 24, 2018	Creep	Radiohead	95.8	Won
January 25, 2018	Sabihin	Zelle	93.6	Won
January 26, 2018	Jar of Hearts	Christina Perri	94.8	Won
January 27, 2018	Somebody That I Used to Know	Gotye	94.4	Won
February 5, 2018	Someone Like You	Adele	96.2	Won
February 6, 2018	Diamonds	Rihanna	92.4	Lost

==== Season 2, Quarter IV – Semi-finals ====
On February 5, 2018, Berdin defended the golden microphone for five consecutive days. Consequently, at the age of 16 years old, she became the first semi-finalist of TNT Season 2, Quarter IV, followed by Mark Douglas Dagal, Aljun Alborme, Arabelle Dela Cruz, and Reggie Tortugo, Adelene Rabulan, Arbie Baula, JM Bales and Christian Bahaya. The nine semi-finalists competed during the week-long Semi-finals starting May 12, 2018. Berdin performed daily during the rounds and earned a standing ovation and praises from the judges on the Round 4, with her rendition of "Banal Na Aso, Santong Kabayo" by Yano. In the next round, Berdin performed an emotional rendition of Narda by Kamikazee which earned another standing ovation and moved one of the judges Ogie Alcasid into tears. On the last day of the Semi-finals, Berdin received her third standing ovation and earned the highest combined score of 97.98% and advanced to the grand finals, alongside Reggie Tortugo, who received the score of 60.84%.

Songs Performed by Janine Berdin: Semifinals (Tawag ng Tanghalan Season 2, Quarter IV)
Performance Date	Theme	Song Performed	Original Artist
Round 1 – May 12, 2018	Audition Song	The Edge of Glory	Lady Gaga
Round 2 – May 14, 2018	Awit Para Kay Inay	Tomorrow	Andrea McArdle
Round 3 – May 15, 2018	Musical Influence	Ang Huling El Bimbo	Eraserheads
Round 4 – May 16, 2018	Hurados' Choice	Banal Na Aso, Santong Kabayo	Yano
Round 5 – May 17, 2018	OPM	Narda	Kamikazee
Round 6 – May 18, 2018	Semi-final Song	Skyscraper	Demi Lovato

==== Season 2, Grand Finals ====
Twelve TNT Season 2 Grand Finalists were to perform in the week-long competition that took place on May 28–June 2, 2018 held at the Aliw Theater. During the first round of the Grand Finals, Berdin performed Eraserheads' With A Smile and garnered a combined score of 98.2% eventually becoming part of the Top 6. During the live finale, after performing Bamboo's Tatsulok/Noypi/Hallelujah medley, Berdin earned the highest combined score of 96.11% to emerged as the Grand Champion followed by Ato Arman (74.27%) and Steven Paysu (61.80%).

Songs Performed by Janine Berdin: TNT Season 2 Grand Finals
Performance Date	Song Performed	Original Artist	Combined Score (%)
Round 1 - May 28, 2018	With A Smile	Eraserheads	(98.20%) Advanced to the Top 6
Round 2 - May 30, 2018	N/A	N/A	Safe
Round 3 - May 31, 2018	N/A	N/A	Safe
Round 4 - June 1, 2018	N/A	N/A	Safe
Live finale – June 2, 2018	Nosi Ba Lasi	Sampaguita	(N/A) Advanced to the Final 3
Live finale – June 2, 2018	Tatsulok/Noypi/Hallelujah medley	Bamboo	(96.11%) Grand Champion

Berdin's performance during the daily rounds of Season 2, Quarter IV of TNT until the Grand finals were published on ABS-CBN Entertainment's YouTube channel The videos of these performance were Top Trending for days and went viral on YouTube and within a month of publishing, the top 2 videos have reached over 8.7 million views and all the other videos have racked over 1 million views. With her popular renditions of Filipino songs, she was nicknamed as the New Gem of OPM.

The livestream video of “Tawag ng Tanghalan” at the day of the Grand finals on June 2, 2018 also made a record of 100,000 concurrent viewers on YouTube. As of June 24, 2018, the TNT video performance of Berdin had already accumulated over 60 million views (18 videos).

ABS-CBN's TNTVersions YouTube channel opened a new online video blog series entitled TNTVlog featuring Berdin as the official host, the 1st episode was published on June 21, 2018.

In December 2018, Berdin's grand final performance of Bamboo songs medley was named as the second top trending videos that entertained Filipinos in 2018 according to YouTube Rewind.

=== 2018–present: Post Tawag ng Tanghalan and breakthrough ===
On July 7, 2018, Berdin signed for a recording contract with the new label TNT Records under Star Music where she performed live for her new carrier single Biyaya written by Chochay Magno. The new single was released on Spotify, Apple Music, Amazon Music and other music streaming platforms starting July 27, 2018.

Berdin was announced to be part of a major concert set to be held on July 28, 2018 at the Araneta Coliseum dubbed as TNT All Star Showdown. She was introduced as one of the headliners with Season 1 Grand Champion Noven Belleza, Finalist Sam Mangubat and the TNT Boys. After a successful result, the sold-out concert was followed by TNT All Star Showdown - Cebu held at the Hoops Dome, Lapu Lapu City on September 21, 2018.

On September 25, 2018, Berdin was honored to receive the formal invitation to attend the ABS-CBN Ball for the first time. Berdin belted out a performance together with her idols KZ Tandingan and Yeng Constantino during the ABS-CBN Ball.

On September 26, 2018, Berdin was announced to interpret and record Mas Mabuti Pa, composed by Mhonver Lopez & Joanna Concepcion. The song earned Star Music Listeners Choice Award and 4th best song for the Himig Handog 2018 P-Pop Love Songs.

On October 7, 2018, Berdin performed the Opening theme of the drama series Kadenang Ginto during ASAP. The song entitled Nasa Puso is composed by Jeremy Sarmiento.

On December 20, 2018, Berdin announced on Magandang Buhay that she was recently confirmed as an ASAP regular co-host and performer.

In July 2019, Berdin once again interpreted a song, "Sa'yong Mundo", an entry for the top 12 Himig Handog 2019. The song is written by Noel Zuniga Cabalquinto.

In August 2019, Berdin became a member of the girl group J.E.Z. together with Elha Nympha and Zephanie. One of the guesting at GGV mash-up performance of J.E.Z. gained more than 9million streams on YouTube The group took a hiatus in March 2020 until Sheena Belarmino joined the group in January 2021 and Zephanie returned to the group 2 months later. The newly revived group, now branded as New Gen Divas or New Gen Birit Divas, would debut on April 25, 2021, with Janine representing the color red in the said group.

Some time in July 2021, she, along with her co-member Zephanie were unavailable to perform for the New Gen Divas due to prior commitments for the taping cycle that had to be done prior to the reimposition of the enhanced community quarantine in Metro Manila. They were temporarily replaced by Gigi De Lana and Lara Maigue. She would later return to the group in September 2021, following the group's appearance on Madlang Pi-Poll, a segment of It's Showtime.

== Personal life ==
In September 2019, Berdin was treated for vocal nodules using steroids. She was later diagnosed with Cushing's syndrome, a side effect from her medication. She attended St. Joseph's School of Mactan during her formative years.

== Discography ==
=== Studio albums ===
List of extended plays, with selected details
Title	Album details
WTF I Actually Wrote These Songs	Released: June 10, 2022; Label: Star Music; Formats: Digital download, streaming
Lab Songs ng mga Tanga	Released: September 26, 2025; Label: Island Records; Formats: Digital download, streaming

=== Singles ===
==== As lead artist ====
List of singles as lead artist, showing year released, selected chart positions, and associated albums
Title	Year	Peak chart positions			Album
Title	Year	PHL Songs (Note: The Billboard's Hits of the World chart launched and was first issued on the date February 19, 2022.)	PHL	TPS	Album
"Biyaya"	2018	—	—	—	Non-album single
"Mas Mabuti Pa"	2018	—	—	—	Himig Handog
"Nasa Puso"	2019	—	—	—	Non-album single
"Sa'yong Mundo"	2019	—	—	—	Himig Handog 2019
"Wala Ako N'yan"	2019	—	—	—	Non-album single
"Bulalakaw" (featuring Joanna Ang)	2020	—	—	—	Himig Handog 11th Edition
"The Side Character"	2021	—	—	—	WTF I Actually Wrote These Songs
"Dito"	2021	—	—	—	Love Beneath the Stars (Original Soundtrack)
"Pagod Na Ako"	2021	—	—	—	WTF I Actually Wrote These Songs
"Mahika" (with Adie)	2022	1	26	19	Senaryo
"I'm Not Her"	2022	—	—	—	WTF I Actually Wrote These Songs
"Araw-araw, Ikaw"	2022	—	—	—	WTF I Actually Wrote These Songs
"Padayon Lang"	2022	—	—	—	WTF I Actually Wrote These Songs
"She Was Only 16"	2022	—	—	—	WTF I Actually Wrote These Songs
"Pagod Na" (with Sam Mangubat)	2022	—	—	—	Non-album singles
"Bagay Nga Tayo Pero"	2023	—	—	—	Non-album singles
"Sitwasyonship"	2023	—	—	—	Lab Songs ng mga Tanga
"Mikasa" (with Arthur Nery)	2024	—	—	—	Non-album singles
"Alas Dos Na!"	2024	—	—	—	Non-album singles
"Pamamaalam"	2024	—	—	—	Lab Songs ng mga Tanga
"Ayos Lang"	2025	—	—	—	Lab Songs ng mga Tanga
"Antoxic"	2025	—	—	—	Lab Songs ng mga Tanga
"What If I Miss You for the Rest of My Life?"	2025	—	35	13	Lab Songs ng mga Tanga
"Tayo lang (may alam)"	2025	—	—	—	Lab Songs ng mga Tanga
"Hayup ka"	2025	—	—	—	Lab Songs ng mga Tanga
"Palag Na 'To"	2026	—	—	—	MPL PH Anthem
"Friendship Over"	2026	—	—	—	More Lab Songs ng mga Tanga

==== As featured artist ====
List of singles as featured artist, showing year released, and associated albums
Title	Year	Album
"Gunita" (Sponge Cola featuring Janine Berdin)	2020	Non-album singles
"Habangbuhay/Habang Buhay" (Dom Guyot featuring Janine Berdin)	2023	Non-album singles

=== Other appearances ===
Title	Year	Album
"Pancit" (Juan Karlos featuring Janine Berdin)	2021	Drop 1
"Live Christ, Share Christ" (with various artists)	2021	Gifted to Give
"Leni Laban!" (with various artists)	2022	Non-album singles
"Liwanag sa Dilim" (All Star Version)	2022	Non-album singles
"Bahay" (with various artists)	2023	Non-album singles

== Filmography ==
=== Television ===
Year	Title	Role
2022–2023	PIE Borito	Co-host
2018–2023	ASAP Natin 'To	Performer
2018	Maalaala Mo Kaya: Mikropono	Herself
2018	Tawag ng Tanghalan: Season 2, Quarter IV	Grand Champion
2018	Umagang Kay Ganda	Guest
2018	Magandang Buhay	Guest
2013	Maalaala Mo Kaya: Ilog	Young Shiela
2013	Maalaala Mo Kaya: Pasa	Young Maida
2012	Maalaala Mo Kaya: Baunan	Young Norma
2012	Wansapanataym: Ang suyod ni Ang Suh-yod	Merly
2012	Wansapanataym: Hannah Panahon	Hannah's Sister (as Janine Bardin)
2011	Maalaala Mo Kaya: Tungkod	Young Bogs
2011	Mutya	School bully (uncredited)

== Concerts ==
Title	Date	Venue	Country	Description	Ref.
TNT All Star Showdown	July 28, 2018	Araneta Coliseum	Philippines	with fellow TNT Artists	
TNT All Star Showdown Cebu	September 21, 2018	Hoops Dome, Lapu-lapu City	Philippines	with fellow TNT Artists, Directed by Joane Laygo	
Pinoy Hype 2018	September 28, 2018	Al Nasr Leisureland	United Arab Emirates	with TNT BOYS, BoybandPH	
Listen: The Big Shot Concert	November 30, 2018	Araneta Coliseum	Philippines	Guest performer for the TNT Boys	
500th year of Victory at Mactan Concert	April 27, 2021	Mactan Shrine	Philippines	Guest performer	
Concert ni Janine Berdin	October 7, 2026	New Frontier Theater	Philippines	First major solo concert	

== Awards and nominations ==
Year	Organization	Category	Work	Result	Ref.
2018	RAWR Awards	Favorite Newbie	—N/a	Nominated	
2019	Push Awards	Push Music Performance of the Year	"Banal na Aso"	Nominated	
2019	MOR Pinoy Music Awards	Best New Artist of the Year	"Mas Mabuti Pa"	Nominated	
2019	World Class Philippines Council	Most Promising Female Music Artist	—N/a	Won	
2020	33rd Awit Awards	Best Song Written for Movie/TV/Stage Play	"Nasa Puso"	Nominated	
2021	34th Awit Awards	Best Regional Recording	"Bulalakaw" (with Joanna Ang)	Nominated	
2023	10th National Customers' Choice Achiever Awards	Performing Artists Best Female Recording Artist	—N/a	Won	
2023	8th Wish Music Awards	Wish Song Collaboration of the Year	"Mahika" (with Adie)	Won	
2023	8th Wish Music Awards	Wish Song Collaboration of the Year	"Pancit" (with Juan Karlos)	Nominated	
2023	4th VP Choice Awards	OPM Song of the Year	"Mahika" (with Adie)	Won	
2023	36th Awit Awards	Best Performance by a Female Recording Artist	"I'm Not Her"	Nominated	
2023	36th Awit Awards	People's Voice Favorite Song	"Mahika" (with Adie)	Nominated	
2024	Billboard Philippines Women in Music	Listeners' Choice Award	"Sitwasyonship"	Nominated	
2026	39th Awit Awards	Best Ballad Recording	"What if I miss you for the rest of my life?"	Won	
2026	39th Awit Awards	Best Performance by a Solo Artist	"What if I miss you for the rest of my life?"	Won	

== Notes ==
Awards and achievements
Preceded by Jhon Clyd Talili	Tawag ng Tanghalan; 2017-2018 season 2	Succeeded by Elaine Duran
