= Hev Abi =

Filipino rapper, songwriter (born 2002)

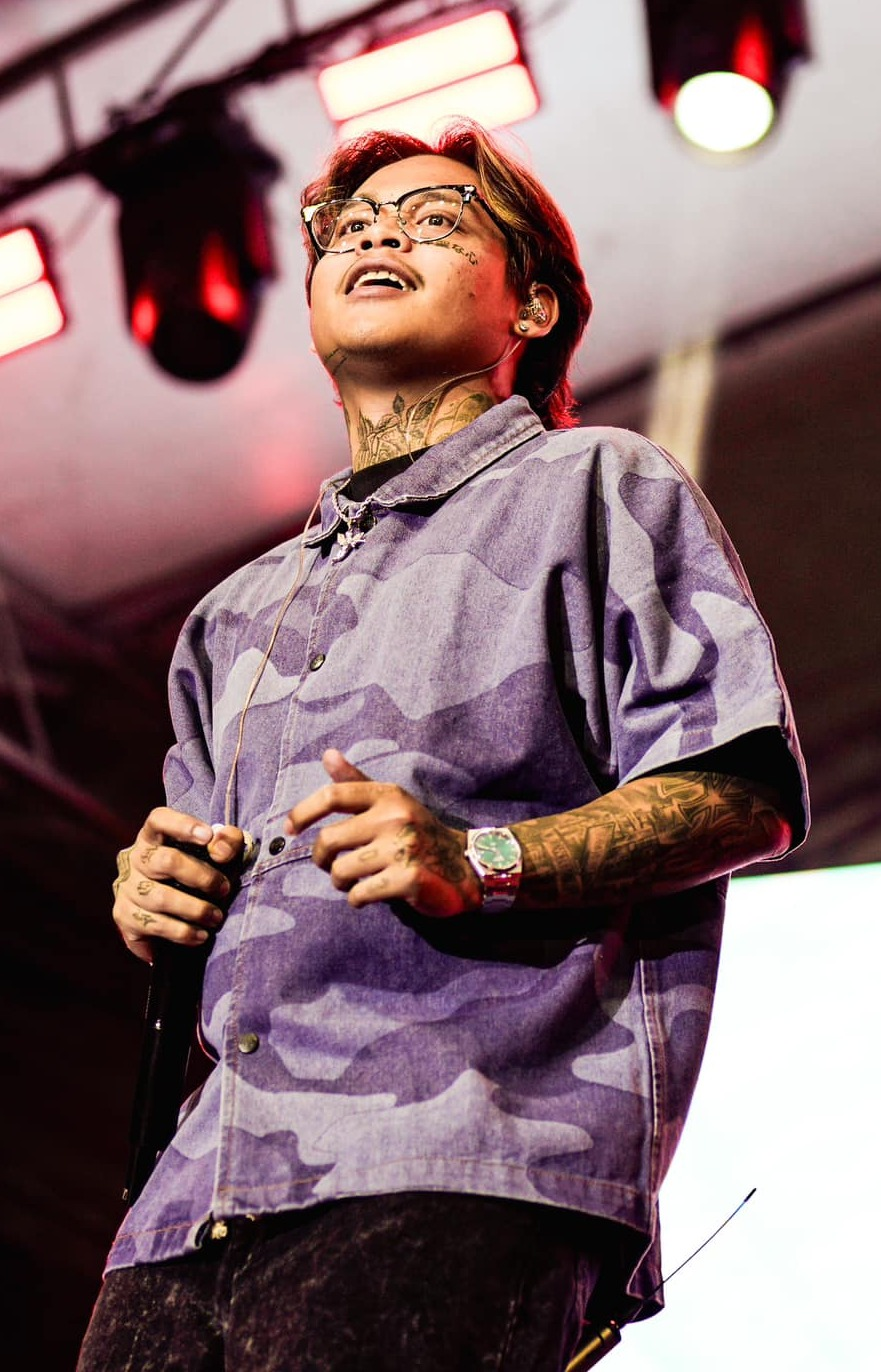
- Hev Abi in 2025

Background information
- Born: Gabriel Abilla; January 31, 2002 (age 24)
- Origin: Quezon City, Philippines
- Genres: Pinoy hip-hop
- Occupations: Rapper; songwriter
- Years active: 2020–Inactive
- Label: Downtown Q' Entertainment

Gabriel Abilla (Note: Hev Abi's real name can be seen in the writer credits on his songs on Spotify.) (born January 31, 2002), known professionally as Hev Abi, is a Filipino rapper from Quezon City. He gained popularity in 2023 with a string of successful singles, starting with the viral "WELCOME2DTQ". He also helped start the independent record label, Downtown Q Entertainment. In October, Hev Abi released his debut album Kung Alam Mo Lang. He appeared on three consecutive number one songs on Billboard’s Philippines Songs charts, including "Alam Mo Ba Girl" and "Babaero". Hev Abi's breakthrough is part of a wider peak in Filipino hip-hop's popularity caused by mainstream attention and streaming services.

== Career ==
=== 2020–2023: Early work and breakthrough ===
Hev Abi's earliest release on Spotify was the 2020 single "Pusong Bato", which he followed with an extended play (EP) titled Kwentong Jimenez in 2021. In 2022, he released two more EPs, Pautang ng Pag-Ibig and Sakred Boy. (Note: Although Pautang ng Pag-Ibig and Sakred Boy are classified as albums on Spotify, most sources refer to Kung Alam Mo Lang as Hev Abi's debut album. When a SCOUT Magazine writer interviewed the rapper, they did the same and wrote that Sakred Boy was an EP. This article, therefore, describes the two records as EPs.) Abi gained mainstream recognition in 2023 when his single "WELCOME2DTQ" slowly spread through word of mouth and went viral online. On TikTok, it has been used in over a million clips, including by celebrities such as Vice Ganda. Amassing millions of streams, the song became his first on Billboard’s Philippines Songs chart in October. It stayed there for four weeks, entering and peaking at number twenty.

Hev Abi's newfound social media popularity earned him a string of successful singles, including "Para sa Streets", "QC Girls", and "Lil Kasalanan Shortie". He also helped start an independent record label, Downtown Q Entertainment, where he collaborates with other rappers. It has signed artists Kristina Dawn, gins&melodies, Unotheone, and Simmo, all of whom featured on Hev Abi's debut album. Fans dubbed Abi "Rookie of the Year" in Pinoy hip hop. Rappler's list of the year's breakthrough OPM acts, called Hev Abi "arguably one of the biggest", since all his 2023 releases had done well.

=== 2023–present: Kung Alam Mo Lang, Maduming Timog, and commercial success ===
On October 20, 2023, Hev Abi released his debut album, the twelve-track Kung Alam Mo Lang ("If Only You Knew"). It is a more vulnerable record with themes of unconditional love; the first half is about romance and the second, replete with features, deals with strong friendships. Abi described the album as an outlet for his emotions after he went through several private, impactful events in the months before its release.

Aside from being on Esquire Philippines and SunStar Davao's year-end lists of the best OPM releases, Kung Alam Mo Lang received little critical attention. Esquire Philippines' Paul John Caña thought it had an impressive "kind of polish and finesse" usually reserved for experienced artists. On October 26, Kung Alam Mo Lang debuted as the 78th most-played OPM album on Spotify. It has been the most played for 16 consecutive weeks from January to May 2024. At least three songs from the album have entered Billboard's Philippines Songs charts: "Alam Mo Ba Girl", which has been on it for 26 consecutive weeks; "Walang Alam"; and "Sumugal".

After Kung Alam Mo Lang, Hev Abi continued to release singles and collaborations, starting with R&B singer Demi, on "Pakundangan". In February 2024, The Philippine Star's Baby A. Gil noticed that Pinoy hip-hop had taken over the country's music charts—and Hev Abi was at the forefront. On Spotify, where he had five of the Top 25 Philippine songs, Abi had accrued over two million monthly listeners. He appeared on three consecutive number one songs on the Philippines Songs charts. "Makasarili Malambing", a Kristina Dawn song that he featured on, and "Alam Mo Ba Girl" each took the spot for a week in February 2024. Another song Abi featured on, "Babaero" by gins&melodies, was number one for the next five weeks. Gil thought modern Filipino rap sounded closer to pop music, "softer" and more "lovelorn". While he considered them serious competitors to Filipino pop, Gil questioned whether the rookie generation of rappers would "stand the test of time" as much as the classic rappers.

In April, Hev Abi became the first local artist to have eight simultaneous tracks on the Philippines Songs charts and the most-played male OPM artist on Spotify. His first headlining concert, Morato Most Wanted, was held in Quezon City's New Frontier Theater on the 28th. On August 23, 2024, Hev Abi released his fifth career project and mixtape, bahay namin maliit lamang, which consists of seven songs, including "pasulyap-sulyap" and "julie pakipot", with the latter being an interpolation of Eraserheads' single Ligaya.

On February 13, 2026, Hev Abi released his nineteen-track sophomore album Maduming Timog. The album was originally set for release on February 14, 2025, but was postponed indefinitely. One of the album's tracks, "ALL NIGHT LONG", was released as a single on January 16, 2026. On April 16, 2026, Hev Abi was arrested over unlawful possession of firearms.

== Artistry ==
Hev Abi was inspired to start making music by emulating his favorite rappers, including Kanye West and Tyler, the Creator. He pays tribute to his hometown, Quezon City, and his street, Tomas Morato Avenue, in his songs. Little is known about his personal life, which Gil thought was a clever way to increase interest in him, however unintentional.

Hev Abi's songs range from the aggressive delivery of "WELCOME2DTQ" to the relaxed vocals of "Para Sa Streets". His lyricism on Kung Alam Mo Lang is more personal compared to the bravado and confidence of his earlier work, and the first half has love songs. When he starts writing, Abi has a general concept for each song but otherwise keeps his method fluid. Gelo Lasin, the editor-in-chief of Complex Philippines, ascribed Abi's mainstream success to how his lyrics can be sentimental, confident or "maangas" (proud) without seeming inauthentic or too offensive. Lasin added that his "smooth" beats and "casual" tunes appealed to younger listeners; his vocals have incorporated singing. Hev Abi has produced some of his songs himself, including "Binibiroski" and the boom bap of "Alam Mo Ba Girl" on Kung Alam Mo Lang. Most of the album, however, was produced by Neil John "NJ" Subong.

== Discography ==
=== Studio albums ===
- Kung Alam Mo Lang (2023)
- Maduming Timog (2026)

=== Singles ===
==== As lead artist ====
List of singles, showing year released, selected chart positions, and associated albums
Title	Year	Peak chart positions		Album
Title	Year	PHL Songs (Note: The Billboard Philippines Songs chart was first introduced in February 2022 and discontinued in July 2024.)	PHL (Note: The Billboard Philippine Hot 100 chart was relaunched in July 2024.)	Album
"Pusong Bato" (with Kelly Corpuz)	2020	—	—	Non-album singles
"Lil Kasalanan Shortie"	2022	7	51	Non-album singles
"Di Na Saluhin"	2022	—	—	Non-album singles
"Migpasayelo" (with L.K)	2022	—	—	Non-album singles
"Para Sa Streets"	2023	18	70	Non-album singles
"Welcome2DTQ"	2023	20	—	Non-album singles
"Yung Totoo?" (with Sica)	2023	—	—	Non-album singles
"Baan Poolview Freestyle"	2023	—	—	Non-album singles
"Mossa Downtown" (with gins&melodies)	2023	—	—	Non-album singles
"Still"	2023	—	—	Kung Alam Mo Lang
"Burgis" (with Flow G)	2024	14	14	Non-album singles
"Kung Ika'y Sasaglit"	2024	—	—	Non-album singles
"ALL NIGHT LONG"	2026	—	—	Maduming Timog
"—" denotes releases that did not chart or were not released in that region.

==== As featured artist ====
List of features, showing year released, selected chart positions, and associated albums
Title	Year	Peak chart positions		Album
Title	Year	PHL Songs	PHL (Note: The Billboard Philippine Hot 100 chart was relaunched in July 2024.)	Album
"Makasarili Malambing" (Kristina Dawn featuring Hev Abi)	2023	1	33	Non-album singles
"Babaero" (gins&melodies featuring Hev Abi)	2024	1	13	Non-album singles
"Subomoto (Hev Abi Remix)" (Zae featuring Hev Abi)	2024	—	—	Non-album singles

== Awards and nominations ==
Award	Year	Category	Recipient(s)	Result	Ref.
New Hue Video Music Awards	2025	Hiphop Artist of the Year	Himself	Won	
