= Sun and Moon (Anees song) =

2022 single by Anees

Single by Anees

from the album Summer Camp
- Released: 6 April 2022
- Songwriters: Anees Mokhiber; Kevin Spears; Wessel Okkes; Zach Matari; John Roa (remix)
- Producers: Anees Mokhiber; Wessel Okkes; Kevin Spears; Zach Matari

Anees singles chronology
"What Lovers Do" (2021)	"Sun and Moon" (2022)	"Leave Me" (2022)

Music videos
- "Sun and Moon" on YouTube
- "Sun and Moon" (remix) (ft. JROA) on YouTube

"Sun and Moon" is a song by American artist Anees. It was released on April 6, 2022 as the lead single from his debut album, Summer Camp. The song was written by Anees alongside songwriters Kevin Spears, Sekko, and Zach Matari.

"Sun and Moon" is described as a guitar-driven love song. A remix featuring Filipino musician JRoa was released to streaming platforms on April 14, gaining the song's popularity in the Philippines, especially on TikTok. "Sun and Moon" climbed to number one on Billboard Philippines Songs, staying at its peak for five weeks as the first international song to top the chart.

An official music video was released on April 21. Both Anees and JRoa included the track as part of their respective tours. Anees has also performed the song in Jimmy Kimmel Live! and Genius' Verified.

== Background ==
=== Original ===
In November 2021, Anees previewed the chorus of "Sun and Moon" to his social media accounts to positive response, leaning into R&B and a departure from his rap sound. He released "Too Good to Be True" featuring Kevin Spears as a follow-up to this new style, with Spears producing both tracks. Anees continued to preview snippets of the track before being released officially to streaming platforms on April 6 and confirming it as his lead single for his debut album.

=== Remix ===
To promote the song, Anees launched an open verse challenge on TikTok upon its official release. On April 11, former Ex Battalion member JRoa uploaded his version to the site. Anees reached out to JRoa to record a full duet to the song, releasing the official "Sun and Moon" remix on April 14 with an accompanying live performance video of both acts performing from different locations.

== Composition ==
Anees announced that "Sun and Moon" is a tribute to love and adoration, adding "it's a romantic little lullaby". Unable to remember its clear songwriting process, he wrote the song in dedication to his wife: "I knew there was something completely different about her that I was not going to find elsewhere." The lyrics "dream girl" is written as an allusion to the dream girl concept or about a specific person in someone's dream. The first verse is composed as a profession of eternal romance, while the second verse described the indescribable ethereal feeling of falling in love.

Music critics described the song as a guitar-driven R&B-pop track. Baby A. Gil of Philstar defined its sound as "light pop melody with a touch of R&B and includes a very pronounced hook". Lyrically, "Sun and Moon" is defined as a juxtaposition of ideas, depicting feelings of longing and regret, vengeance and satisfaction, selfishness and sacrifice, fortune and fate.

== Commercial performance ==
After the release of its official remix and music video, "Sun and Moon" debuted at number three on Billboard Philippines Songs on April 26, 2022 – for the week ending dated April 30, 2022 – becoming Anees' first entry on the chart. The song rose to number one on the chart dated May 7, making "Sun and Moon" the first English song to reach the summit and Anees as the first international artist to top the list. The song stayed at five weeks at number one on the chart. As of March 2023, the track has gained 99 million streams on Spotify, becoming Anees' most streamed song. In New Zealand, "Sun and Moon" peaked at number 17 on New Zealand Hot Singles.

== Music video ==
The music video for "Sun and Moon" was released on April 21, 2022. Directed by Issa Kaddissi, the video featured Anees serenading a girl seated at the audience from onstage, ending in applause. Behind the video's direction, Anees stated how "it felt natural to put the music video and set it on a stage in a small little auditorium that maybe even felt like a spoken word vibe." He added how the addition of mannequins as part of the auditorium crowd was purposeful: "They take up the seats, they’re not even real. It’s still just a one-on-one." The video has received over 10 million views as of March 2023.

== Live performances ==
Anees performed "Sun and Moon" live for the first time months before its release on January 20, 2022 at Bar Lubitsch, Los Angeles, United States. An acoustic version of the song was released with Zach Matari on guitar on May 3 to his YouTube account. On May 28, Genius uploaded their Verified episode of the song with Anees singing the song's lyrics and detailing the song's composition.

On June 28, Anees makes his debut televised performance of the song on Jimmy Kimmel Live! to kick off the Summer Camp Tour in promotion of his album. Anees confessed to Zainab Mudallal of The Washington Post how dream-like was his experience on the program: "Six months ago I created that song right here in this seat, and then to see that within half a year, I was able to go on one of the biggest stages in the planet and sing it to the world, it’s crazy."

JRoa has included his version of the song in Canada Filipino Hip-hop Fest 2022, his joint Canadian tour with fellow Ex Battalion members Flow G and Skusta Clee. "Sun and Moon" was performed from November 11 in Calgary up until JRoa's last show on December 3 in Vancouver.

== Impact ==
Regarding the song's rise to fame, Anees commented how hearing the youth playing the song changed him: "I don’t think you could ask for anything more beautiful than for children to be listening to your music. Children have the purest spirits, purest heart, purest ears. If they are getting down with your music, you’re doing something right in my opinion."

Following the popularity of the remix, several Filipino artists have covered the song, including Matthaios, Arthur Miguel, and BGYO.

In Philippine popular culture, an orchestral version of the song was declared as the "official school hymn" of the "International State College of the Philippines", a satirical educational institution and meme on Facebook. The lyrics of JRoa's Tagalized chorus of the song was declared as the institution's mission and vision on its website. Parody branches of the Facebook page also included a campus bearing the song's name (Sun and Moon Campus). Constantly using the song as an essential part of its meme branding, the page garnered more than 600,000 followers and reached 25 million users organically on the social media site in its first week of infancy.

== Credits and personnel ==
Credits are adapted from Anees' official site.

- Anees Mokhiber – lead vocals, songwriter, producer
- Kevin Spears – producer, songwriter
- Wessel Okhes – songwriter
- Zach Matari – producer, songwriter
- John Roa – rap, vocals, songwriter (remix)
- Raul Lopez – mix engineer
- Berlin – mastering engineer

== Charts ==
Weekly chart performance for "Sun and Moon"
Chart (2022)	Peak position
New Zealand Hot Singles (RMNZ)	17
Philippines (Billboard)	1

== Release history ==
Region	Date	Format	Ref.
Various	April 6, 2022	Digital download; streaming	
United States	August 16, 2022	Contemporary hit radio	
