= Adie (Filipino singer) =

Filipino singer and songwriter (born 2001)

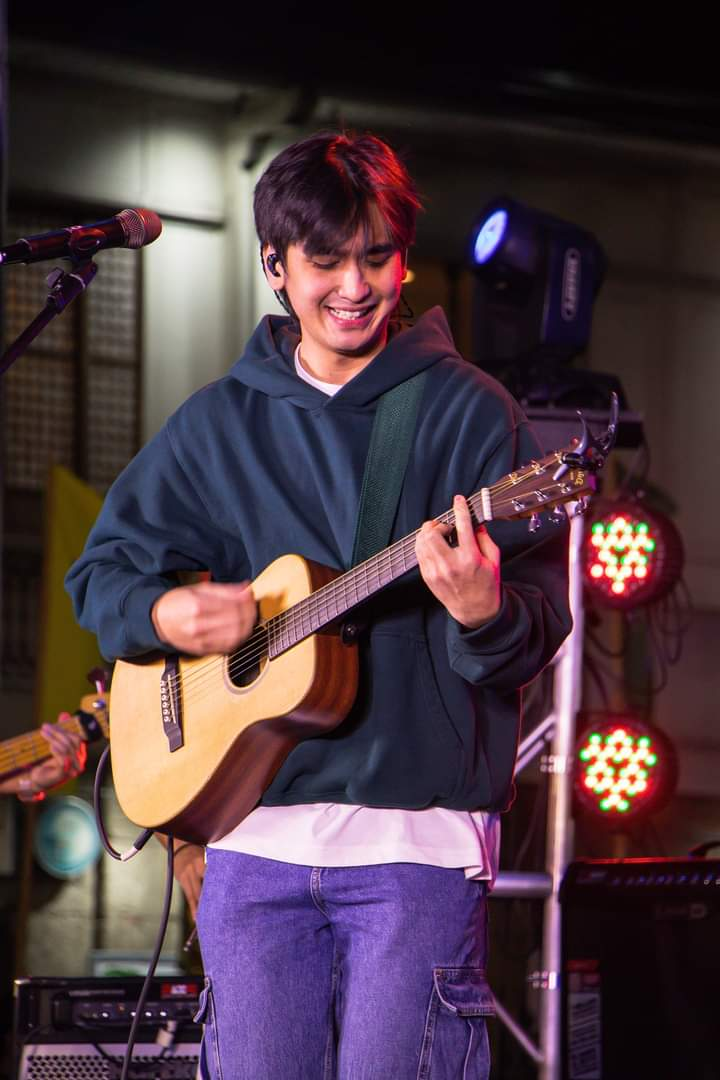
- Adie in 2023

Background information
- Born: Adrian Garcia Eugenio; February 10, 2001 (age 25); Biñan, Laguna, Philippines
- Occupations: Singer; songwriter
- Years active: 2020–present
- Musical career
- Genres: Pop; R&B; indie pop; alternative pop
- Years active: 2020–present
- Label: O/C Records (2020–present)

Adrian Garcia Eugenio (born February 10, 2001), known as Adie is a Filipino singer and songwriter. Signed under Kean Cipriano's O/C Records since 2020, he has released his debut studio album, Senaryo (2024), which contained the Philippines Songs chart hits "Paraluman" (2021), "Tahanan" (2021), and "Mahika" (2022).

== Career ==
In 2020, Adie was started as a top competitor in a collaboration contest of Callalily with Kean Cipriano as a lead vocalist during that time. Even though he did not make it to win, Adie got a bigger prize when Cipriano signed him in O/C Records. In the same year, Adie released a debut single, "Luha".

In 2021, Adie released a second single titled "Paraluman" which made it to the No. 1 Chart of Spotify's Viral 50 and Trending Tracks Playlists. In its music video, actress Ivana Alawi is portrayed as a titular character with him as a leading man. Aside from Alawi, some actresses have appeared in music videos of several singles of Adie such as Rhen Escaño from the third single Dungaw, Angelina Cruz from the fourth single Sawa Na, and Andrea Brillantes from the fifth single "Tahanan".

In 2022, Adie's collaboration single "Mahika" with Janine Berdin peaked at No. 1 in Billboard Philippines Songs for two weeks, and has become the chart's longest charting song at 70 weeks. On the same year, Adie was among the breakout artists of the American magazine Rolling Stone.

In 2024, Adie released Gino Padilla's rendition "Closer You and I" as an accompanying track of a toothpaste brand Close-Up, starring Donny Pangilinan and Belle Mariano in a music video.

== Discography ==
=== Album ===
List of albums, with selected details
Title	Album details
Senaryo	Released: December 15, 2023; Label: O/C Records; Formats: Digital download, streaming

=== Singles ===
==== As lead artist ====
List of singles as lead artist, showing year released, selected chart positions, and associated albums
Title	Year	Peak chart positions			Album
Title	Year	PHL Songs (Note: The Billboard's Hits of the World chart launched and was first issued on the date February 19, 2022.)	PHL	TPS	Album
"Luha"	2020	—	—	—	Non-album single
"Paraluman"	2021	6	24	22	Senaryo
"Dungaw"	2021	—	—	—	Senaryo
"Sawa Na"	2021	—	—	—	Non-album single
"Tahanan"	2021	11	—	—	Senaryo
"You'll Be Safe Here"	2022	—	—	—	Non-album single
"Mahika" (with Janine Berdin)	2022	1	26	19	Senaryo
"Kabado"	2022	—	—	—	Senaryo
"Tinatangi" (feat. Chrstn)	2022	—	—	—	Coke Studio Philippines (season 6)
"G.K.Y.A.M."	2023	—	—	—	Senaryo
"Kursunada"	2023	—	—	—	Senaryo
"Closer You and I"	2024	—	—	—	Non-album singles
"Oh, Giliw"	2024	—	—	—	Non-album singles
"Nobya"	2024	—	—	—	Non-album singles
"Ms. Pakipot"	2025	—	—	—	Non-album singles
"Piliin"	2025	—	—	—	Non-album singles
"Panatag"	2026	—	—	—	Non-album singles

==== As featured artist ====
List of singles, with year released and album name shown
Title	Year	Album
"Balik" (with Dom Guyot)	2024	Non-album single
"Umpisa" (with Moira Dela Torre)	2025	Non-album single
"Paralisado" (with Arthur Nery)	2026	Non-album single

== Awards and nominations ==
Year	Award(s)	Category	Nominated work	Result	Refs.
2023	14th PMPC Star Awards for Music	Male Acoustic Artist of the Year	"Paraluman"	Won	
2023	8th Wish Music Awards	Wishclusive Contemporary Folk Performance of the Year	"Tahanan"	Won	
2023	8th Wish Music Awards	Wish Song Collaboration of the Year	"Mahika" (with Janine Berdin)	Won	
2023	4th VP Choice Awards	OPM Song of the Year	"Mahika" (with Janine Berdin)	Won	
2024	9th Wish Music Awards	Wish Contemporary R&B Song of the Year	"G.K.Y.A.M."	Nominated	
2024	9th Wish Music Awards	Bronze Wishclusive Elite Circle	"Mahika" (with Janine Berdin)	Won	
2024	15th PMPC Star Awards for Music	Collaboration of the Year	"Mahika" (with Janine Berdin)	Won	
2024	Awit Awards	Best Vocal Arrangement	"G.K.Y.A.M."	Won	
2025	10th Wish Music Awards	Wish Contemporary R&B Song of the Year	"Kursunada"	Nominated	
