= John Roa =

Filipino singer (born 2000)

- Born: John Neil Torrente Roa; January 25, 2000 (age 26); Cebu City, Philippines
- Genres: Pop; R&B; Pinoy hip hop; OPM
- Occupations: Singer; songwriter
- Years active: 2016–present
- Labels: Viva Records; Ex Battalion Music
- Member of: Ex Battalion
- Spouse: Raina Eguia (m. 2023)

John Neil Torrente Roa (born January 25, 2000), known professionally as John Roa or JRoa, is a Filipino singer and songwriter. He first gained recognition as a member of the hip-hop group Ex Battalion before leaving in 2017 to pursue a solo career and returning in 2020. In 2019, he released his debut extended play (EP) Amgo, under Viva Records.

== Early life ==
John Neil Torrente Roa was born and raised in Cebu City. He showed an early interest in music and performed publicly as a child. In 2010, he appeared in singing contest TV5's Talentadong Pinoy. In 2013, he appeared as a solo contestant on season four of Pilipinas Got Talent. Two years later, he competed on Tawag ng Tanghalan on It's Showtime, gaining further recognition as a singer. In 2015, he was awarded Best Child Performer for his role in the short film Sampaguita at the Sinulog Film Festival.

== Career ==
Roa became a member of Ex Battalion in 2016 under his name "JRoa", serving as the group's main vocalist during the time it rose to mainstream popularity with hits like "Hayaan Mo Sila" (transl. Let Them Be). While with the collective, he focused on learning hip-hop and R&B techniques to match the group's style. On December 8, 2017, Roa performed the This is Home concert at The Stage in Elizabeth Mall, Cebu City. He include "Byahe" (transl. Trip) from his self-titled debut album, released the previous year with 10 original tracks and three bonus songs, as well as "Di Ako Fuckboy" (Note: The name is written without an apostrophe before "Di", a contraction of the word "Hindi".) (transl. I'm Not A Fuckboy), which he had recorded earlier that year with Emcee Rhenn and Agsunta. In the same year, he told the members that he wanted to leave and officially departed later that year to pursue his own musical direction. He emphasized that the split was "friendly" and that he maintained a good relationship with the group after leaving.

After leaving Ex Battalion, Roa focused on his solo career and released the song "Oks Lang" (transl. I'm Fine), which reflected his personal experiences. He signed with Viva Artists Agency and Viva Records. In 2019, Roa released his debut extended play (EP) Amgo, a five-track record. The title comes from the Cebuano word for "realization". The EP included the songs "Lagi" (transl. Always), "Muli" (transl. Again), "Andiyan" (transl. There), "Natatangi" (transl. Special), and "Itutuloy" (transl. Will Continue). Roa said the project reflected his personal experiences and realizations, and that writing it helped him cope with a period of anxiety and panic attacks.

In 2020, four years after leaving the group, Roa returned to Ex Battalion with the song "Woah". In 2022, the group released a new music video for "We The Best" which featured his participation. The upbeat track features Skusta Clee, Brando, Emcee Rhenn, King Badger, and Flow G.

Alongside his solo work, Roa has worked with other artists. In 2022, he released the single "Infinity" with singer-songwriter Quest, which they co-wrote. He also teamed up with Frizzle Anne for the pop-R&B song "Akin Ka Lang" (transl. You're Only Mine), released through O/C Records.

In 2023, Roa co-wrote and was featured on Sarah Geronimo's song "Alam" (transl. Know), one of his most prominent collaborations as a songwriter and performer.

== Personal life ==
Roa has shared that he has dealt with anxiety and depression, and that his faith and support from family and friends helped him through difficult times. He has also said that his personal experiences influence his songwriting and that taking risks has been important in his career.

Roa has been in a long-term relationship with singer-songwriter Raina Eguia. In 2021, he proposed to her during the premiere of one of his music videos, an event that was later made public. In June 2023, Roa announced on social media that they were married.

== Awards and nominations ==
Awards and nominations received by John Roa
Award	Year	Recipient	Category	Result	Ref(s)
Awit Awards	2024	"Alam" (with Sarah Geronimo)	Best Collaboration	Nominated	
Awit Awards	2024	"Alam" (with Sarah Geronimo)	People's Voice Favorite Collaboration	Nominated	
MOR Pinoy Music Awards	2019	"Oks Lang"	Digital Artist of the Year	Nominated	
Myx Music Awards	2019	"Oks Lang"	Mellow Video of the Year	Nominated	
PMPC Star Awards for Music	2023	"Deliks"	Male Pop Artist of the Year	Nominated	
Wish 107.5 Music Awards	2021	"Oks Lang"	Wishclusive Ballad Performance of the Year	Nominated	
Wish 107.5 Music Awards	2024	"Akin ka Lang" (with Frizzle Anne)	Wishclusive Collaboration of the Year	Nominated	
Wish 107.5 Music Awards	2024	"Sige Padayon"	Wishclusive Contemporary R&B Performance of the Year	Nominated	

== Discography ==
=== With Ex Battalion ===
- "Kakaiba" (2016)
- "Come With Me" (2017)
- "Bootyful" (2017)
- "Sana Ikaw Na Nga" (2017)
- "Woah" (2020) (Note: Four years after leaving Ex Battalion, Roa returned to the group with the single, released in 2020. The song features only Roa's verse, as Ex Battalion was under record production at the time.)
- "We The Best" (2022)

=== Albums ===
- Byahe (2016)
- Free Love (2025)
- Echoes of Time (2026)

=== EPs ===
- Amgo (2019)

=== Selected singles ===
- "Byahe" (2016)
- "Larawan" (2016) featuring Flow G
- "Dati" (2016) featuring Skusta Clee
- "Di Ako Fuckboy" (2018)
- "Taguan" (2018)
- "Oks Lang" (2018)

=== Collaborations ===
- "Sun and Moon" (2022) – with Anees (Remix version)
- "Infinity" (2022) – with Quest
- "Akin Ka Lang" (2022) (with Frizzle Anne)
- "Alam" (2023) – with Sarah Geronimo
