= Philippines Songs =

Defunct Philippine song chart

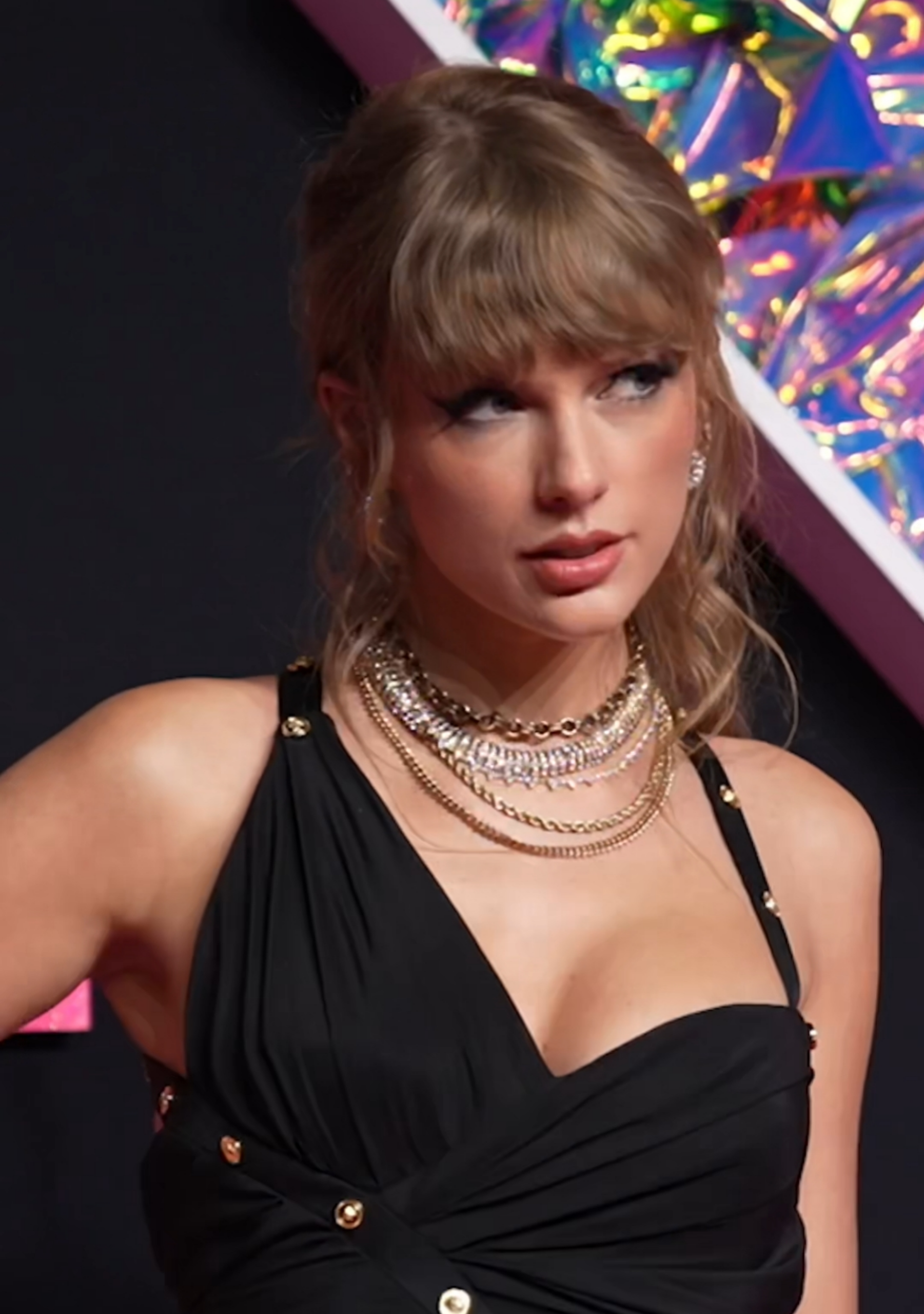
American singer-songwriter Taylor Swift had the most chart entries as well as the most number-ones on the Philippines Songs chart.

Philippines Songs was a music record chart in the Philippines, compiled by Billboard since February 2022. Updated every Tuesday on Billboard's website, the chart was announced on February 14, 2022 as part of Billboard's Hits of the World chart collection, ranking the top 25 songs weekly in more than 40 countries around the globe. This was the first local Billboard chart in the Philippines since the discontinuation of the Philippine Hot 100 and four other charts after Billboard Philippines halted its operation for an undisclosed reason on January 15, 2018.

The first number-one song on the chart was "Pano" by Zack Tabudlo on the issue dated February 19, 2022.

"Mahika" by Adie and Janine Berdin was the longest-running song on the chart with 72 weeks, ending its run on December 16, 2023. Taylor Swift was the artist with the most chart entries overall, and most number-ones on the chart by the week dated May 4, 2024.

The magazine published the last issue of the chart on June 18, 2024, for the week of June 29, with Maki's "Dilaw" as the number-one song. On July 1, Billboard Philippines discontinued the chart in preparation for the relaunch of the Philippines Hot 100 chart and the introduction of the new Top Philippine Songs chart. The two new charts began on July 3, with rankings updated every Wednesday.

== Methodology ==
The chart tracked the performances of songs from Friday to Thursday. Chart rankings were based on digital downloads from full-service digital music retailers (sales from direct-to-consumer sites such as an individual artist's store are excluded) and online streaming occurring in the Philippines during the tracking period. All data was provided by Luminate Data, formerly MRC Data.

== List of number-one songs ==
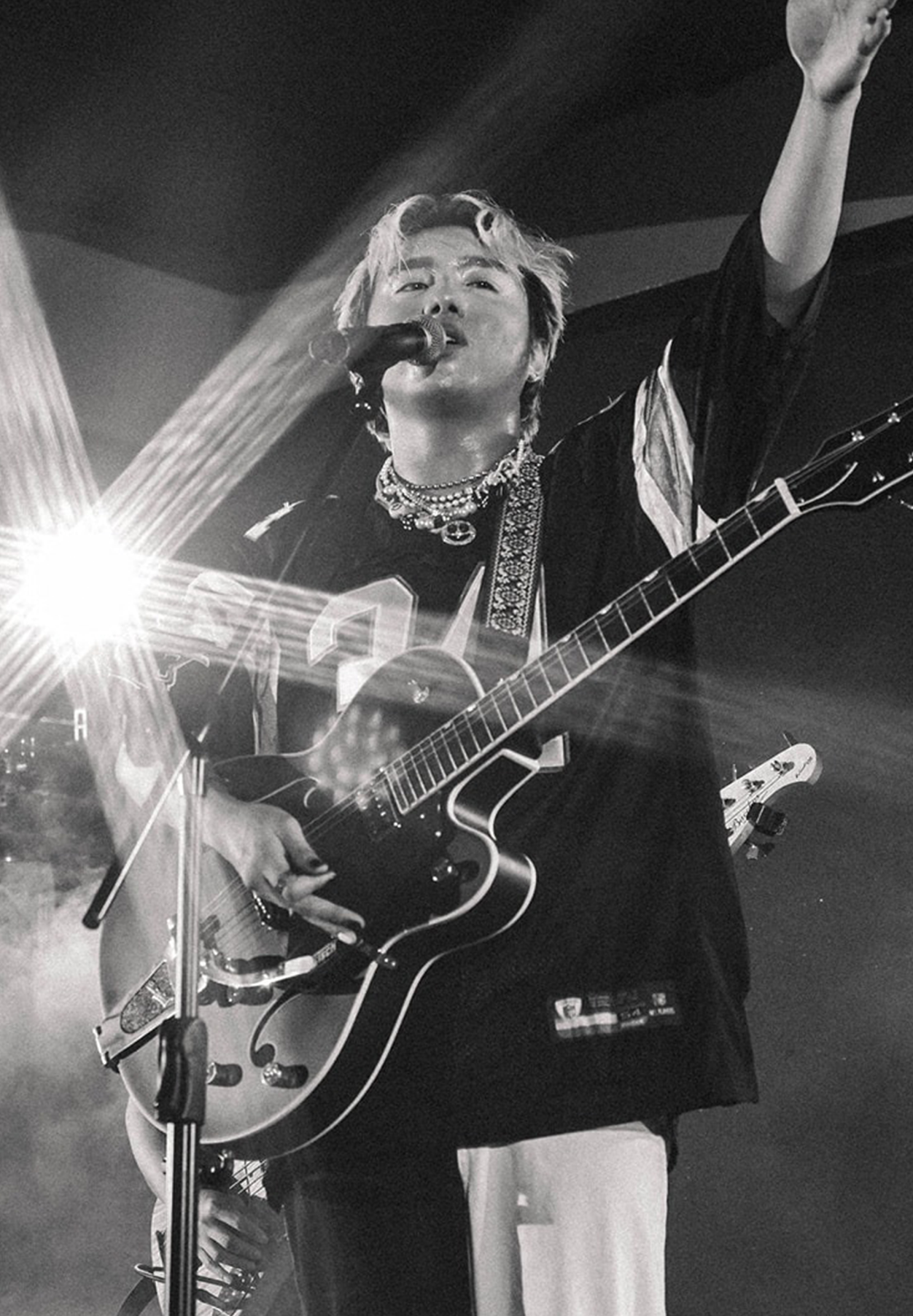
Zack Tabudlo's "Pano" was the first song to debut at number one and became the longest-running single on the chart with eleven weeks.

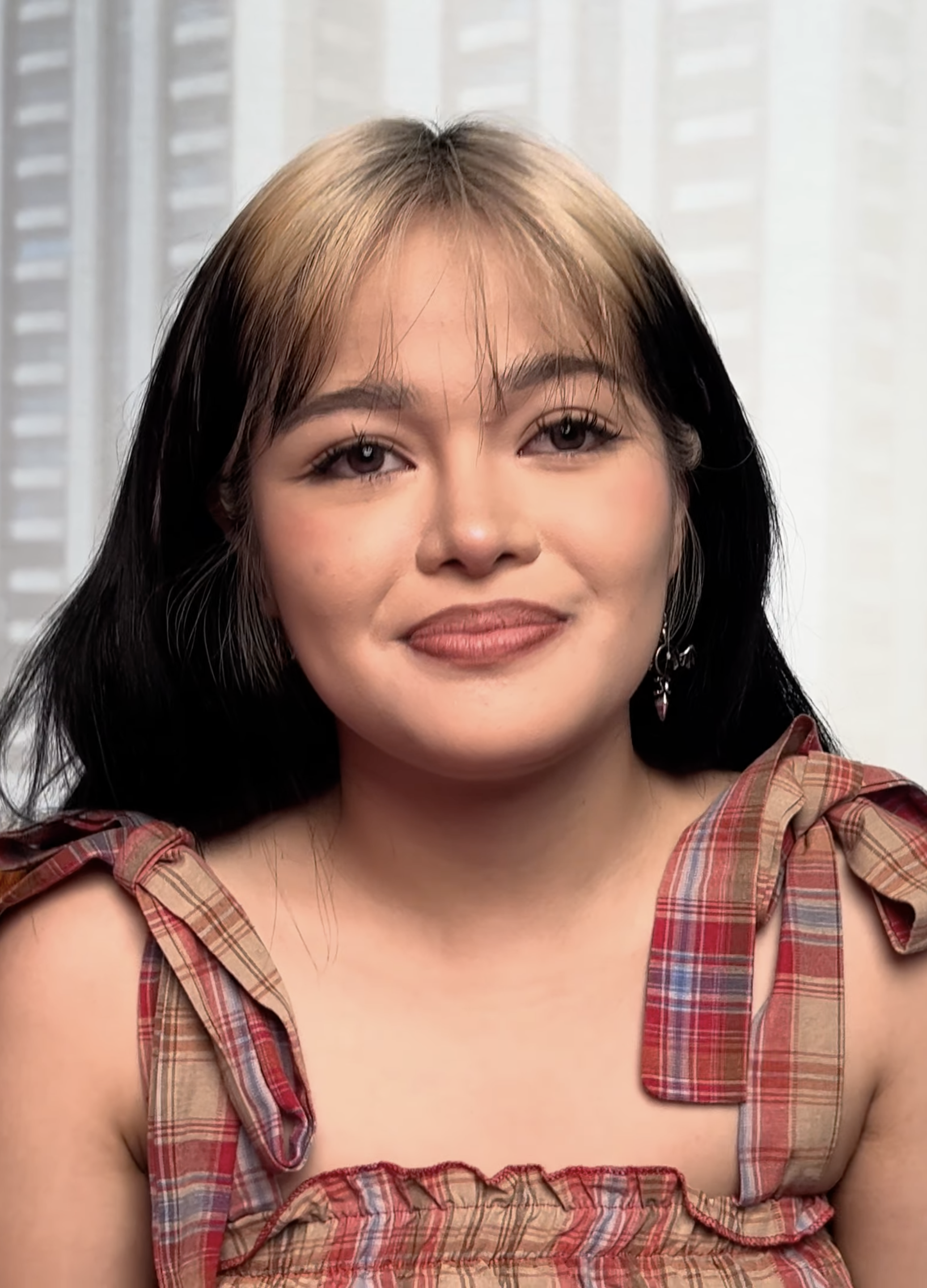
Janine Berdin was the first Filipino singer to reach No. 1 with "Mahika". In collaboration with Adie, the song was the first Filipino duet on top.

=== 2022 ===
In 2022, eleven acts achieved their first Philippine number-one single on the Philippines Songs chart, either as a lead artist or a featured artist: Zack Tabudlo, Anees, Troye Sivan, BTS, Joji, Charlie Puth, Jungkook, Blackpink, Adie, Janine Berdin, and Taylor Swift. Out of the ten number-one songs in the calendar year, six singles debuted at the top spot. Zack Tabudlo's "Pano" became the first song to debut and peak at the summit, making it the first OPM chart-topper and Tabudlo as the first Filipino to reach number one on the Philippines Songs chart. It was also the longest-running number-one single of the chart, having stayed at the top for eleven consecutive weeks. Taylor Swift's "Anti-Hero" led the top place for nine weeks, the longest stay by a female artist on top. Charlie Puth's "Left and Right" topped the chart for eight consecutive weeks, while Anees' "Sun and Moon" spent five weeks at the number-one spot after making its mark as the first international number one of the chart.

Adie and Janine Berdin's "Mahika" was the first Filipino duet to reach the summit, allowing Berdin to be the first Filipino to lead the chart. Blackpink's "Shut Down" debuted at number one in October, ending the run of their own "Pink Venom", both from the album Born Pink. The feat made Blackpink the first act to achieve two consecutive number-ones, and the only act in 2022 to produce multiple number-one songs.

Issue date	Song	Artist(s)	Weeks	Ref.
February 19, 2022	"Pano"	Zack Tabudlo	11	
May 7, 2022	"Sun and Moon"	Anees	5	
June 11, 2022	"Angel Baby"	Troye Sivan	2	
June 25, 2022	"Yet to Come"	BTS	1	
July 2, 2022	"Glimpse of Us"	Joji	1	
July 9, 2022	"Left and Right"	Charlie Puth featuring Jungkook	8	
September 3, 2022	"Pink Venom"	Blackpink	4	
October 1, 2022	"Shut Down"	Blackpink	3	
October 22, 2022	"Mahika"	Adie and Janine Berdin	2	
November 5, 2022	"Anti-Hero"	Taylor Swift	9	

=== 2023 ===
Issue date	Song	Artist(s)	Weeks	Ref.
January 7, 2023	"Kill Bill"	SZA	4	
February 4, 2023	"Flowers"	Miley Cyrus	2	
February 18, 2023	"Kill Bill"	SZA	2	
March 4, 2023	"Pasilyo"	SunKissed Lola	1	
March 11, 2023	"Die for You"	The Weeknd and Ariana Grande	4	
April 8, 2023	"Uhaw"	Dilaw	10	
June 17, 2023	"Angels like You"	Miley Cyrus	4	
July 15, 2023	"Cruel Summer"	Taylor Swift	1	
July 22, 2023	"Back to December (Taylor's Version)"	Taylor Swift	1	
July 29, 2023	"Seven"	Jungkook featuring Latto	11	
October 14, 2023	"3D"	Jungkook and Jack Harlow	1	
October 21, 2023	"Ere"	Juan Karlos	9	
December 16, 2023	"You're Losing Me"	Taylor Swift	1	
December 30, 2023	"711"	Toneejay	1	

=== 2024 ===
Issue date	Song	Artist(s)	Weeks	Ref.
January 6, 2024	"Ere"	Juan Karlos	1	
January 13, 2024	"Cruel Summer"	Taylor Swift	1	
January 20, 2024	"711"	Toneejay	1	
January 27, 2024	"Get Low"	O Side Mafia and BRGR	2	
February 10, 2024	"Makasarili Malambing"	Kristina Dawn featuring Hev Abi	1	
February 17, 2024	"Alam Mo Ba Girl"	Hev Abi	1	
February 24, 2024	"Babaero"	gins&melodies featuring Hev Abi	5	
March 30, 2024	"We Can't Be Friends (Wait for Your Love)"	Ariana Grande	4	
April 27, 2024	"Pantropiko"	Bini	1	
May 4, 2024	"Fortnight"	Taylor Swift featuring Post Malone	1	
May 11, 2024	"Pantropiko"	Bini	4	
June 8, 2024	"Salamin, Salamin"	Bini	2	
June 22, 2024	"Dilaw"	Maki	2	

== Song milestones ==
=== Most weeks at number one ===
No. of weeks	Song	Artist	Release year
11	"Pano"	Zack Tabudlo	2022
11	"Seven"	Jungkook featuring Latto	2023
10	"Uhaw"	Dilaw	2023
10	"Ere"	Juan Karlos	2023
9	"Anti-Hero"	Taylor Swift	2022
8	"Left and Right"	Charlie Puth featuring Jungkook	2022

== Artist milestones ==
=== Most number-one songs ===
No. of songs	Artist	Songs
5	Taylor Swift	"Anti-Hero" "Cruel Summer" "Back to December (Taylor's Version)" "You're Losing Me" "Fortnight"
3	Jungkook	"Left and Right" "Seven" "3D"
3	Hev Abi	"Makasarili Malambing" "Alam Mo Ba Girl" "Babaero"
2	Ariana Grande	"Die for You" "We Can't Be Friends (Wait for Your Love)"
2	Bini	"Pantropiko" "Salamin, Salamin"
2	Blackpink	"Pink Venom" "Shut Down"
2	Miley Cyrus	"Flowers" "Angels like You"
