= What If I Miss You for the Rest of My Life? =

2025 song by Janine Berdin

Single by Janine Berdin

from the album Lab Songs ng mga Tanga
- Released: September 26, 2025
- Recorded: 2024–2025
- Genre: Alternative rock; OPM; indie pop; folk
- Length: 3:06
- Label: Island Records Philippines
- Songwriter: Janine Berdin
- Producers: Janine Berdin; J. Greg; Emil Dela Rosa; Kirk Andrei Basilio; Xergio Ramos; Luke Gabriel Casanova; Timothy James Castillon

Janine Berdin singles chronology
"Antoxic" (2025)	"What If I Miss You for the Rest of My Life?" (2025)	"Friendship Over" (2026)

"What If I Miss You for the Rest of My Life?" (stylized in sentence case) is a song written, co-produced, and recorded by Filipino singer-songwriter Janine Berdin. It was released on September 26, 2025, as the ninth track from her debut studio album, Lab Songs ng mga Tanga, under Island Records Philippines and announced as an official on June 10, 2026.

Despite not being pushed as an initial radio single upon the album's launch, the track achieved viral recognition and commercial success in mid-2026 following an acclaimed live performance on the Wish 107.5 Bus and the track mark Berdin's first ever solo entry on the Billboard Philippines charts. The song won 2 major awards, Best Ballad Recording and Best Performance by a Solo Artist at the 39th Awit Awards.

== Composition and lyrics ==
"What if I miss you for the rest of my life?" is an alternative rock ballad that utilizes a slow-core dynamic structure, lasting 3 minutes and 6 seconds. The track begins softly, featuring a gentle, stripped-back acoustic guitar arrangement accompanied by Berdin's vulnerable vocal delivery. During the bridge, the song transitions into a heavy, cathartic punk rock and alternative arrangement characterized by a wall-of-sound electric guitar section and intense, gritty vocal belting.

Lyrically, the song explores the lingering, agonizing fear of an inability to move on from a past love. The song heavily subverts typical heartbreak tropes by actively rejecting the maturity of viewing a failed relationship as a "growth experience." The climax features the heavily quoted lines:

"I have built a house where I wait for your return / I only want you to be mine and not a lesson learned."

== Live performances ==
In May 2026, Berdin performed the song live on the Wish 107.5 Bus. A snippet of the performance shared on her official social media accounts went viral, drawing significant traction and public praise from both domestic and high-profile international music figures.

== Reception ==
American pop singer Demi Lovato publicly commented on the performance video, expressing awe at Berdin's vocal power. Other international artists, including Fifth Harmony's Lauren Jauregui, R&B singer-songwriter Jessie Reyez, Doechii, and SZA publicly commended her vocal control and raw emotional delivery. American rock band The Click Five and OPM icon Rico Blanco were among the numerous musicians who also amplified the performance online. Berdin also recorded an official full-band live version for the Cozy Cove video series. The track also received a positive feedback to the netizens which some of them are having a hard to sing the song.

=== Accolades ===
Year	Event	Category	Result	Ref.
2026	39th Awit Awards	Best Ballad Recording	Won	
2026	39th Awit Awards	Best Performance by a Solo Artist	Won	

== Personnel ==
Credits adapted from the official liner notes of LAB SONGS NG MGA TANGA and Universal Music Group:

- Janine Berdin – lead vocalist, composer, lyricist, producer
- J. Greg – producer, drum programmer
- Emil Dela Rosa – producer, recording engineer, mixing engineer, mastering engineer
- Luke Gabriel Casanova – producer, recording engineer
- Jet Francisco – recording engineer
- Kirk Andrei Basilio – producer
- Xergio Ramos – producer
- Timothy James Castillon – producer

Live in Studio - Credits adapted from liner notes on YouTube & Spotify

- Words & music by: Janine Berdin
- Produced by: Ziv
- Mixing Engineer: Jacques Jenkins
- Mastering Engineer: Nicholas Di Lorenzo
- Recording Engineer: Lia Isabel Reoma, Kirk Basilio
- Studio: Spryta Productions
- Musicians: Luke Cassanova - Bass
- Kirk Basilio - Drums
- TJ Castillon - Guitars

== Charts ==
Chart (2026)	Peak position
Philippines (Billboard Philippines Hot 100)	35
Philippines (Billboard Top Philippine Songs)	13
