= Pasilyo =

Single by SunKissed Lola
- Language: Filipino
- Released: October 28, 2022
- Recorded: 2022
- Genre: OPM, indie rock, pop rock
- Length: 4:30
- Label: Ditto Music
- Songwriter: Alvin Serito
- Producer: SunKissed Lola

SunKissed Lola singles chronology
"HKP" (2022)	"Pasilyo" (2022)	"White Toyota" (2023)

Lyric video
- "'Pasilyo'" on YouTube

"Pasilyo" (transl. Aisle) is a song recorded by Filipino band SunKissed Lola. It was released on October 28, 2022, by Ditto Music as their third single overall. The song was written by Alvin Serito and collaboratively produced by the band members, with mixing by Shadiel Chan. Lead vocalist Dan Ombao explained that the concept of the song is to live the dream of being married someday and being someone's certainty.

"Pasilyo" consists of a waltz structure as a kundiman ballad with modern jazz rock elements. The song was a commercial success, reaching number one on Spotify Philippines and breaking the record for the biggest single-day streams for an OPM song. (Note: The record was surpassed by "Uhaw" by Dilaw on April 1, 2023 with 694,337 daily streams.) It topped Billboard Philippines Songs, making SunKissed Lola the first Filipino band in history to lead the chart.

The track also became a viral hit on TikTok and is considered the band's signature hit, being performed multiple times in live performances.

== Background ==
On August 19, SunKissed Lola officially made its debut in streaming platforms with the release of their first single "Makalimutan Ka" (To Forget You), followed up by the track "HKP" on September 16. The band announced on October 17 on their social media sites its plans to launch "Pasilyo" as the finale of its debut trilogy, setting its release date to October 28.

== Composition ==
"Pasilyo" is described as a "wedding anthem", a waltz ballad with modern jazz rock elements capturing the OPM sound. The song is in the key of D major, playing at 120 bpm with a running time of four minutes and 30 seconds.

The lyrics was written by lead vocalist Alvin Serito and explained the idea of marriage and walking down the aisle with your partner as part of one's prayers. The song is notable for repeating the word "ikaw" numerous times in its chorus, stressing the importance of one's partner as their only wish. Guitarist Dan Ombao added how they envisioned its message as "that endearing feeling of being someone's 'sure thing' in this world full of uncertainties."

== Commercial performance ==
A month after its release, "Pasilyo" debuted on top of the Spotify Viral 50 – Philippines chart dated November 23, 2022, remaining for eight consecutive days. It reached number one on both daily and weekly charts of Spotify Philippines and broke the record for the biggest single-day streams for an OPM song in Spotify history on February 11, 2023, with 585,829 plays. The following day, it gained 606,923 streams, becoming the first local song to break the 600K mark. On the week of Valentine's Day, the song rose to number one on the weekly Top Songs – Philippines chart of Spotify, replacing "Kill Bill" by SZA. It set the mark for the biggest weekly streams for an OPM song in Spotify with 4,069,788 plays. The song continued to eclipse its records, reaching its peaks on February 24 with 691,069 daily streams and on March 2 with 4,303,718 weekly streams. (Note: The record was surpassed by "Uhaw" by Dilaw on April 6, 2023 with 4,895,813 weekly streams.) The following week, it entered the top ten at number 6 with gains in streams and downloads. "Pasilyo" finally rose to number one in the Philippines in its seventh week, heavily assisted by its streaming peak and making SunKissed Lola the first OPM band to reach the summit. It was succeeded on the top spot by "Die for You" by the Weeknd and Ariana Grande on the chart dated March 11.

== Live performances ==
The group held their first major performance of "Pasilyo" online in iWant ASAP on December 4, 2022. They recorded their Wish 107.5 Bus performance of the song on December 13 in Eton Centris, Quezon City. The recording was uploaded on December 27, going viral and accumulating 2 million views on YouTube as of March 8, 2023.

The band also played "Pasilyo" in their first mall show in Ayala Malls Harbor Point, Subic Bay on January 21, 2023. The song was performed at The Cozy Cove, Baguio City on January 28, gaining 2 million views after its upload on YouTube as of April 23. The track was also included in their setlist for Circus Music Festival on April 22.

== Credits and personnel ==
Adapted from the single's lyric video notes.

SunKissed Lola

- Alvin Serito – lead vocals, guitar
- Dan Ombao – backing vocals, guitar
- Laura Lacbain – backing vocals
- Danj Quimson – bass guitar
- Genson Viloria – drums

Additional personnel

- Shadiel Chan – mixing
- Jan Aries Agadier Fuertez – mastering
- Jael Mendoza – art

== Charts ==
=== Weekly chart ===
Weekly chart performance for "Pasilyo"
Chart (2023)	Peak position
Philippines (Billboard)	1
Philippines (Top Philippine Songs)	56

=== Year-end chart ===
2023 year-end chart performance for "Pasilyo"
Chart (2023)	Position
Philippines (Billboard)	3

2024 year-end chart performance for "Pasilyo"
Chart (2024)	Position
Philippines (Philippines Hot 100)	54

== Release history ==
Region	Date	Format	Label(s)
Worldwide	October 28, 2022	Digital download	Ditto Music
