= Anees (musician) =

American singer, rapper & songwriter (born 1992)

anees
- Born: Anees Mokhiber; July 30, 1992 (age 34); Washington D.C., U.S.
- Other name: anees
- Occupations: Singer; rapper; songwriter
- Musical career
- Genres: Pop; R&B; hip hop; pop rap
- Instruments: Vocals; guitar
- Years active: 2017–present
- Website: aneesofficial.com

Anees Mokhiber (Arabic: أنيس مخيبر, born July 30, 1992), known mononymously as Anees (stylized in small caps), is a Palestinian-American singer, rapper, and songwriter known for his hit song, "Sun and Moon", the first international artist on top Billboard Philippines Songs chart.

== Life and career ==
=== 1992–2024: Early life ===
Anees Mokhiber was born on July 30, 1992, in the suburbs of Washington D.C. He was raised and has resided in Northern Virginia. Anees is an Arab American with Palestinian and Lebanese ancestry. Anees studied at George Mason University, majoring in philosophy and sociology in 2014. His courses became pivotal to his growth as a "deep thinker and conscious lyricist." Being a minority, Anees felt accessibility and opportunity in the school, "falling in love with my time on campus, whether it was going to office hours or walking around campus during sunset." He worked as a pizza delivery man to save up for his studies. While attending summer camp, Anees performed bomber freestyling: "You would, on the fly, come up with a four-bar rhyme to go back-and-forth with someone. I always felt very alive doing it."

Anees attained a Juris Doctor degree in 2017 from the Antonin Scalia Law School at George Mason University in Arlington, Virginia before deciding to pursue a music career. He entered a state of depression, confiding to freestyling as his therapy. His degree allowed him "to maneuver business dealings and the legal side of the music business without being taken advantage of as an independent artist," attesting how his legal acumen became significant to his growth. His Ford Focus became his personal practice space and recording studio, developing his sounds and styles.

=== 2019–2021: Breakthrough and Slip ===
Anees posted an early version of "Drunk on Myself" on Instagram in 2019, showing off his flow and rap style publicly. A year later, he uploaded a snippet of his first composition for "Slip" to TikTok.

On April 14, 2020, Anees made his official debut single with "Neverland Fly", a rap song opening up about his battle with depression and the volatility of mental health. On June 21, he collaborated with Arab producer Thanks Joey and Puerto Rican producer El Bles on the high-octane track "Brown Kid", envisioning it as an anthem for minorities. The following month, he released the song "Maybe" and continued to upload snippets of his upcoming work to promote his brand.

"Slip" made its public release as Anees' next single on April 1, 2021, across music platforms, a love song he dedicated to his wife and his vulnerability. While performing the song on his Instagram Live on April 10, Canadian artist Justin Bieber joined his livestream, increasing his viewership to a total of 60,000 people. Bieber praised his musicality and started an open discussion with Anees, lasting for 45 minutes that resulted to an uptick in his Instagram following to 10,000 followers within the hour. The encounter garnered positive press, especially from the Arab community of musicians, including Narcy, Massari, and Big Hass.

The success of "Slip" led to the overlapping release of the songs "Love Is Crazy", a romantic track requested by his fans, and "Drunk on Myself", an ode to self-love. He also published a performance video for "What Lovers Do", an emotive and provocative rap track that featured his signature flow.

=== 2021–2023: Sun and Moon ===
In November 2021, Anees previewed the chorus of "Sun and Moon" to his social media accounts to positive response, leaning into R&B and a departure from his rap sound. He released "Too Good to Be True" featuring Kevin Spears as a follow-up to this new style, with Spears producing both tracks. Anees continued to preview snippets of the track before being released officially to streaming platforms on April 6, 2022, and confirming it as his lead single for his debut album, Summer Camp.

To promote the song, Anees launched an open verse challenge on TikTok upon its official release. On April 11, former Ex Battalion member JRoa uploaded his version to the site, gaining massive popularity locally, reaching 14 million plays as of May 2022. Anees reached out to JRoa to record a full duet to the song, releasing the official "Sun and Moon" remix on April 14 with an accompanying live performance video of both acts performing from different locations. "Sun and Moon" rose to number-one on the Billboard Philippines Songs chart dated May 7, making it the first English song to reach the summit and Anees as the first international artist to top the list. As of May 2022, the track has gained 20 million streams on Spotify and 5 million views on its music video on YouTube, becoming Anees' most streamed song.

In October 2023, Anees signed the Artists4Ceasefire open letter to Joe Biden, President of the United States, calling for a ceasefire of the Israeli bombardment of Gaza.

=== 2024: Summer Camp ===
Anees released the Summer Camp album and started the tour promoting the album. The tour included many major cities, a performance on Jimmy Kimmel Live, SunFest, and Lovin’ Life Music Fest.

== Artistry and influences ==
Anees described his sound as genre-defying, ranging from hip-hop, pop, rock, R&B, and soul. He cites Eminem, J. Cole, Immortal Technique, and Kanye West as his main musical inspirations, as well as Lebanese-American poet Kahlil Gibran as his reference for his writing style. Among the Arab community, he listed Omar Offendum, Narcy, and DAM as his influences. His other influences include Chance the Rapper, King Los, John Mayer, India Arie, and Marlon Craft. With his newfound success over his evolution in sound, Anees mentioned DMX, Lauryn Hill, Ed Sheeran, and Rex Orange County as being integral in his growth.

== Discography ==
=== Singles ===
List of singles, with year released and album name shown
Title	Year	Peak chart position		Album
Title	Year	NZ Hot	PHL	Album
"Neverland Fly"	2020	—	—	Non-album singles
"Brown Kid" (with Thanks Joey & El Bles)	2020	—	—	Non-album singles
"Maybe"	2020	—	—	Non-album singles
"Slip"	2021	—	—	Non-album singles
"Love Is Crazy"	2021	—	—	Non-album singles
"Drunk on Myself"	2021	—	—	Non-album singles
"What Lovers Do" (with Kevin Spears)	2021	—	—	Non-album singles
"Sun and Moon"	2022	17	1	Summer Camp
"Leave Me"	2022	36	—	Summer Camp
"Kiss My Wounds"	2024	—	—	Non-album single
"—" denotes a release that did not chart or was not released in that region.
