= SunKissed Lola =

Filipino rock band

- Origin: Olongapo, Philippines
- Genres: Indie pop; alternative rock; pop rock
- Years active: 2021–present
- Label: Ditto Music
- Members: Dan Ombao; Alvin Serito; Laura Lacbain; Danj Quimson; Genson Viloria
- Past members: Rodnie Resos

SunKissed Lola is a Filipino rock band formed in Olongapo, Zambales in 2021. The group consists of Dan Ombao (lead vocals, guitar), Alvin Serito (lead vocals, guitar), Laura Lacbain (lead vocals), Danj Quimson (bass guitar), and Genson Viloria (drums). Originally a sextet, Rodnie Resos (keyboards) left the band in 2025.

The band gained prominence with the success of their single "Pasilyo" (Aisle), breaking records in Spotify Philippines and Billboard Philippines Songs as one of the most successful OPM songs in the streaming era.

== History ==
On July 27, 2019, Dan Ombao finished as the third runner-up on the first season of the reality singing competition Idol Philippines, behind winner Zephanie Dimaranan. After the show, Ombao pursued a solo career as he continued his music scholarship at University of the Philippines Diliman. On September 19, 2021, Alvin Serito placed third overall on the wildcard round of Wishcovery Originals by Wish 107.5, ranking first for YouTube views.

=== 2021: Formation ===
SunKissed Lola was formed on December 13, 2021, while Ombao and Serito were looking for a place around Olongapo City to rehearse for a wedding gig. Ombao inquired to Genson Viloria about available studios around the area where they could practice. Danj Quimson, nephew of Rockstar keyboardist Norman Quimson, lent his studio as Viloria's previous bandmate. The quartet jammed on the same day, sharing original songs that led to the band's creation. The band derived their name from a translation of the Tagalog phrase naaninagan ng kalungkutan, combining the English word sunkissed and the Spanish nickname Lola (meaning "sorrow"). Serito referenced their logo from the children's book Lola the Lollipop Fairy (2012).

Prior to the band's formation, Laura Lacbain, Danj Quimson, and Genson Viloria were bandmates in the band Dr. Pocket from 2018 to 2021. They released 4 songs and one of those songs "Paki Sabi" was re-released through SunKissed Lola.

=== 2022-present: Debut and Pasilyo (Aisle) ===
Laura Lacbain, an accountancy alumna from Subic Bay, joined her former bandmates Viloria and Quimson as one of the band's vocalists in March 2022. On July 30, 2022, the band announced its plans to release their debut single "Makalimutan Ka" (To Forget You) to streaming platforms on August 19. While promoting their debut, Serito joined the second season of Idol Philippines, only reaching the Do-or-Die middle round of the competition and being eliminated on the August 7 episode of the program.

The band released a live performance video to their YouTube channel on August 26, rehearsing the song "Eba" (Eve) for Filipino rapper Kiyo as his supporting act in select venues. They released their follow-up single "HKP" to music sites on September 16, along with a visualizer. They made their first online guesting on October 25 for MOR Entertainment.

On October 28, SunKissed Lola released their third single "Pasilyo" (Aisle) across multiple platforms. Described as a romantic wedding anthem, the track debuted on top of the Spotify Viral 50 - Philippines chart dated November 23. It reached number one on Spotify Philippines and broke the record for the biggest single-day streams for an OPM song. It topped Billboard Philippines Songs, making SunKissed Lola the first Filipino band to lead the chart. The band accompanied Kiyo as his supporting act for Enchanted Kingdom's Salo-Salo Fest on December 2 in Santa Rosa, Laguna. The group held their first major performance of "Pasilyo" online in iWant ASAP on December 4. Their Wish 107.5 Bus performance of "Pasilyo" went viral, accumulating 2 million views on YouTube as of March 8, 2023.

SunKissed Lola released "White Toyota" as their fourth single on January 6, 2023, describing the track as one of the first songs they've written and an ode to "road trips". They released "Damag" as their fifth single on March 17 featuring shortone.

In September 2024, SunKissed Lola released their first album titled Olaholah after their Canadian tour last July. This was followed by an Australian tour together with Silent Sanctuary in October.

In October 2025, The band announced that keyboardist Rodnie Resos had left the band.

== Artistry and influences ==
SunKissed Lola described their sound as drawing different genres in terms of arrangement and musicality, ranging from rock, R&B, soul, pop, jazz and classical. Serito cited Owl City and Jason Mraz as major songwriting influences, while Ombao listed the band Moonchild as integral to their sound.

== Band members ==
=== Current members ===
- Dan Ombao – vocals, lead guitar (2021–present)
- Alvin "Bino" Serito – vocals, rhythm guitar (2021–present)
- Laura Lacbain – vocals (2022–present)
- Danj Quimson – bass guitar (2021–present)
- Genson Viloria – drums, percussion (2021–present)

=== Past members ===
- Rodnie Resos – keyboards (2021–2025)

== Discography ==
=== Extended Plays ===
List of extended plays, with selected details
Titles	Album details
Olaholah	Released: September 27, 2024; Formats: Digital download, streaming

=== Singles ===
List of singles, with selected chart positions, and showing year released as single.
Title	Year	Peak chart positions
Title	Year	PHL Songs
"Makalimutan Ka" (To Forget You)	2022	—
"HKP"	2022	—
"Pasilyo" (Aisle)	2022	1
"White Toyota"	2023	—
"Damag" (Night) (featuring shortone)	2023	—
"Paki Sabi"	2023	—
"Luna"	2023	—
"Dal'wang Patinig"	2023	—
"Nene"	2024	—
