= 2025 in Philippine music =

The following is a list of events and releases related to Philippine music that have happened in 2025.

== Events ==
- January 16 – The PPMF 2024 Ryan Cayabyab Awards is held at the BGC Arts Center. The award honors two OPM icons: Celeste Legaspi and Odette Quesada.
- January 18 – Carmelle Collado of King Thomas Learning Academy Inc. in Camarines Sur wins the eighth season of Tawag ng Tanghalan segment on It's Showtime.
- January 19 – The tenth edition of the Wish 107.5 Music Awards is held at the Araneta Coliseum. The award concludes with girl group Bini and solo artist Stell tying for the most wins with three.
- January 24 – Filipino contestant JL Gaspar of P-pop boy band Pluus wins the South Korean reality show Universe League, officially joining the nine-member boy band AHOF.
- February 19 – The Official Philippines Chart was launched by the International Federation of the Phonographic Industry (IFPI) and Philippine Recorded Music Rights Inc. (PRM), ranking the country's top tracks based on streaming data from platforms like Spotify, Apple Music, Deezer, and YouTube Music. A launch party was held in Bonifacio Global City, Taguig. The first award show in the Philippines based on official data from global streaming music platform were also given, honoring Bini as "Top Local Artist of the Year 2024" and "Palagi" by TJ Monterde as "Top Local Song of the Year 2024".
- March 22 – "Wag Paglaruan" composed by Tiara Shaye and interpreted by Fana and Tiara Shaye wins the inaugural songwriting competition Philpop Himig Handog at the New Frontier Theater.
- March 28:
  - Girl group Bini receives the Woman of the Year Award at Billboard Philippines Women in Music.
  - Independent music label and artist management agency Soupstar Music celebrates its 25th anniversary.
- April 15 – "Multo" by pop-rock band Cup of Joe enters the Billboard Global 200 charts, making Cup of Joe the first Filipino act to do so.
- April 26 – Marko Rudio of Pangasinan wins the second season of Tawag ng Tanghalan: All-Star Grand Resbak segment on It's Showtime.
- May 10 – Nine contestants, including six Filipino contestants, win the Filipino-South Korean survival reality show Be The Next: 9 Dreamers.
- May 13 – U.S.-based Filipino rapper Ruby Ibarra wins the 11th edition of NPR Music's Tiny Desk Contest with her winning entry song "Bakunawa".
- May 15 – Girl group Bini are included in this year's Forbes 30 Under 30 Asia.
- May 22 – "Raining in Manila" by alternative rock band Lola Amour wins the Philippine Popular Music special award at the inaugural Music Awards Japan.
- August 17 – Pepe Herrera disguised as "Foxtastic Samurai" wins the third season of Masked Singer Pilipinas.
- August 31 – The Nueva Ecija Singing Ambassadors wins the two gold medals at the Taipei Chorale Competition held in Taipei, Taiwan.
- September 6 – Jean Jordan Abina of Taguig, impersonating the voice of Karen Carpenter wins The Clones: Ka-Voice of the Stars segment on Eat Bulaga!
- September 7 – Jong Madaliday of Cotabato wins the seventh season of The Clash.
- September 28 – 9-year old Alexa Mendoza of Laguna wins the inaugural season of Idol Kids Philippines.
- October 21 – The inaugural edition of Filipino Music Awards is held at the SM Mall of Asia Arena.
- November 8 – Kent Villarba of Cebu wins the ninth season of Tawag ng Tanghalan segment on It's Showtime.
- November 16 – The 38th edition of Awit Awards is held at the Meralco Theater. The Traveller Across Dimensions by Ben&Ben and Misteryoso by Cup of Joe wins Album and Song of the Year respectively.
- December 14 – Sofia Mallares of Zambales wins the seventh season of The Voice Kids.

== Debuting acts ==
=== Bands ===
- DNA
- Finix
- GAT
- It All Started in May
- Mutya
- One Verse
- Raya
- Seiya
- Vvink

=== Solo artists ===
- Alas
- Apple Dy
- Ayaka
- Brei
- Brianna Bunagan
- Chryzquin Yu
- Fyang Smith
- Jarren Garcia
- JL Gaspar
- Kai Montinola
- Kolette
- Krishnah Gravidez
- Malena Leonard
- Michelle Dee
- Rain Celmar

== Reunions and comebacks ==
- Ex Battalion
- Miguel Escueta
- IV of Spades
- Jolina Magdangal

== Disbanded ==
- Ang Bandang Shirley

== Released in 2025 ==
=== First quarter ===
==== January ====
Date	Single / album	Artist(s)	Genre(s)	Label(s)	Ref.
1	Swanton Bomb	Flow G, Yuridope	Hip hop/rap	The Dope Music	
1	Citta (Album)	Karencitta	Hip hop/rap	Lorega Amo Records	
3	A Thousand Voices	Kitchie Nadal, Mondo	Alternative rock	Independent	
3	Panakip Butas	Denin Sy, Flict G	Hip hop/rap	The Cozy Cove	
3	Bounce Back	Luci J	Hip hop/rap	Lucidreams Music	
3	Aalis Tayo	Marc Aljo	Hip hop/rap	Independent	
3	Don't Know What 2 Do (Don't Know What 2 Say)	Hi-C	Hip hop/rap	Independent	
4	Such Be	Razorblackman	Punk Rock	Independent	
5	Getting Pera Baby	Haring Manggi Miguelito Malakas	Hip hop/rap	Independent	
6	Araw-araw Na Lang	Joshua Mari			
6	I Think They Call This Love	Nonoy Peña	R&B/soul	NP14 Records	
9	Paano Ako	Unxpctd, Ednil Beats	Hip hop/rap	Million Racks Records	
9	Oh Ano?	RB Slatt	Hip hop/rap	Independent	
10	Jigsaw Puzzle	Regine Velasquez	Pop	Viva Records	
10	Lovelane	Ella May Saison	Pop	House of Tunes Philippines	
10	The World Is So Small (Album)	Paolo Sandejas	Pop	Sony Music Philippines	
10	Magic	Thea Panaguiton	Pop	Underdog Music PH	
10	Not That Girl (Album)	Barbie Almalbis	Rock	Independent	
10	Sa May Baybayon	Vincent Eco	Folk	Independent	
10	Atin Ang Gabi	Midnight Rue, Mei Teves	Alternative folk	Independent	
10	Dating Gawi	Gloc-9, Abaddon	Hip hop/rap	Universal Records	
10	Wait (Teka Lang)	Playertwo	Hip hop/rap	Warner Music Philippines	
10	Smokeless	Gat Putch, Sica	Hip hop/rap	Greenhouse Records	
10	Tahanan	Matthaios	Hip hop/rap	Independent	
10	Maraming Nagbago	Jeff Grecia	Hip hop/rap	Independent	
10	Zero Sugar (Deluxe Edition) (Album)	Yoki	Hip hop/rap	Independent	
10	Bawi	Yamada	Hip hop/rap	Independent	
10	Agila	Vxon	P-pop	Cornerstone Music	
10	Bagamundo	1621BC	P-pop	Star Music	
10	Huwag Ka Nang Humirit	GAT	P-pop	Ivory Music and Video	
11	The Promise (I'll Never Say Goodbye)	Martin Nievera, Pops Fernandez	Ballad	Vicor Music	
12	Kung Walang Ikaw	Joshua Mari	Hip hop/rap	Independent	
13	Maraming Pera	Haring Manggi Miguelito Malakas	Hip hop/rap	Independent	
14	stuckonu	CRWN, Curtismith	Hip hop/rap	Pool Records; Sony Music Philippines	
16	Eskinita Jazz/Cesar Montana	Sica	Hip hop/rap	Greenhouse Records	
17	Perpektong Tao	Maris Racal	Pop	The Cozy Cove	
17	Infatuation	Kaloy Tingcungco	Pop	GMA Playlist	
17	Ikaw Ang Pinili Ko	Dia Maté	Pop	Radical Music	
17	Afterthought	Jolianne	Pop	Careless Music; Sony Music Philippines	
17	Shot Down	Ayip	Pop	Baybayin Records	
17	You & I	Eunice Rain	Pop	Off the Record; Sony Music Philippines	
17	Teka Lang! (Looper Machine)	Suyen	Alternative	PolyEast Records	
17	Someone	Pixie Labrador	Alternative folk	Offshore Music; Sony Music Philippines	
17	Catch The Next Flight	Ekai	Indie pop	Warner Music Philippines	
17	Chillax	The Agadiers	Rock	The Cozy Cove	
17	Silakbo (Album)	Cup of Joe	Alternative rock	Viva Records	
17	Pasensyoso	The Juans	Pop rock	Viva Records	
17	Bula	MidSummer	Pop rock	KDR Music House	
17	YG Gang	Shanti Dope	Hip hop/rap	Universal Records	
17	Tastemaker	Alisson Shore	Hip hop/rap	Labrynth Records	
17	Pokmaru	Denin Sy, Flict G, Ferry Baltazar	Hip hop/rap	The Cozy Cove	
17	Sala (EP)	Teys	Hip hop/rap	Unstable Entertainment	
17	BLKN	Colt, Yuridope	Hip hop/rap	Independent	
17	Kwentuhan	Guddhist Gunatita, Nateman	Hip hop/rap	Independent	
17	Bongga Ka Day	Raya	P-pop	Viva Records	
18	Dollweb (Album)	Ligaya Escueta	Alternative	Offshore Music; Sony Music Philippines	
19	Sakali	Joshua Mari	Hip hop/rap	Independent	
20	Everyday	Paul N Ballin	Hip hop/rap	Rawstarr Records	
22	Sa Ilalim Ng Alon	Nica del Rosario	Pop	FlipMusic Records	
22	Panghahawakan	Jason Marvin	Inspirational	Waterwalk Records	
23	Inismoke	Jeko Royo, Xaint	Hip hop/rap	Dollar Records	
23	Love Like You	Exalt Worship	Contemporary; Christian	CCF Media	
24	Pagitan	Arthur Miguel	Pop	Warner Music Philippines	
24	Sampung Mga Daliri	Dwta, Justin	Pop	Sony Music Philippines	
24	Love Avenue (EP)	Sam Benwick	Pop	Vicor Music	
24	Paborito	Jiji	Pop	Apollo Music Distribution	
24	Intimano	Joseph Gara, Oh! Caraga	Visayan pop	O/C Music	
24	Kaya	Brisom	Pop rock	The Cozy Cove	
24	My Could Have Been	Better Days	Rock	Universal Records	
24	Awatin	Calein	Rock	Independent	
24	Kumot	Solace Out the Door	Alternative rock	The Cozy Cove	
24	Mahal	Dilaw	Alternative rock	Warner Music Philippines	
24	Mailap	Clien, Allmo$t	Hip hop/rap	Viva Records	
24	Langit	Nik Makino, Shao Lin, TreyLow Baby	Hip hop/rap	Diamond Management	
24	Singungaling	Riscain, Teys	Hip hop/rap	Unstable Records	
24	2HUNNIDK	Matteyo	Hip hop/rap	Greenhouse Records	
24	Ibinababa	BabyDraco, Kris Delano	Hip hop/rap	Blanktapes	
24	Ligaya	David Reyeg	Hip hop/rap	O/C Records	
24	Siglo	Apekz	Hip hop/rap	Independent	
24	Duyan	Vnce	Hip hop/rap	Independent	
24	Sa Iyo	Mutya	P-pop	Vicor Music	
24	Kahanga-hanga	Gloryfall, Acel	Contemporary; Christian	Waterwalk Records	
26	123	Nateman	Hip hop/rap	HTRB Records	
28	Way Outro	Lightskeen Baby	Hip hop/rap	Global Noir	
28	Four (EP)	Calista	P-pop	Merlion Music	
29	When She Cries	Bugoy Drilon	Pop	314 Studios	
29	HIGH ELO	Katsy Lee	Club/EDM	Independent	
29	Mahal Magmahal	Esremborak	Alternative folk	Sony Music Philippines	
31	Tanging Ikaw	Sugarcane	Pop	Warner Music Philippines	
31	Coraline	Lyn Lapid	Pop	Mercury Records; UMG Philippines	
31	Plain Girl (EP)	Jolianne	Pop	Careless; Sony Music Philippines	
31	Batubalani	Anthony Rosaldo	Pop	GMA Playlist	
31	Padama	Noah Alejandre	Pop	Evolution Media	
31	I'm (Really) Good	Darla Baltazar	Pop	Wings Music Group	
31	Little Me	Issa Rodriguez	Pop	Underdog Music PH	
31	Liwanag	Seiya	Pop	The Cozy Cove	
31	Buwan	Rees Gonzales, Lois	Indie pop	Unstable Entertainment	
31	Gulong-gulo	Imago	Alternative rock	Sony Music Philippines	
31	Paham (Album)	Paham	Indie rock	Sony Music Philippines	
31	Panaginip	Snakefight	Punk pop	O/C Records	
31	Magkasama	Johnoy Danao	Alternative pop	Bacon and Shrimpie Records	
31	Yellow	Allmo$t	Hip hop/rap	Viva Records	
31	Another Day	Kiyo, Gloc-9	Hip hop/rap	Independent	
31	2 Joints and Harmony (Album)	Bugoy na Koykoy	Hip hop/rap	Independent	
31	Tarasa	Smugglaz	Hip hop/rap	Independent	
31	Tagu-taguan	Hero	Hip hop/rap	Independent	

==== February ====
Date	Single / album	Artist(s)	Genre(s)	Label(s)	Ref.
1	Welcome to Cebu	Karencitta	Cebuano, Hip hop/rap	Lorega Amo Records	
7	PNYT	Nobita, Flow G	Pop	Sony Music Philippines	
7	Naninibago (Mapanlinlang na Pahiwatig)	Kenaniah	Pop	O/C Records	
7	Eh 'Di Pasensya Na	Brei	Pop	Universal Records	
7	Liwanag sa Dilim	Pablo	Pop	Star Music	
7	Jarren (Album)	Jarren Garcia	Pop	Star Music	
7	Sunflower in the Sunset	Apple Dy	Pop	Viva Records	
7	W.K.N.B. ('Wag Ka Nang Bumalik)	Mark Carpio	Pop	Independent	
7	Kumot	Frizzle Anne	Pop	Independent	
7	Chasing a Firefly	Ian Veneracion	Pop	Independent	
7	Vertigo	Christian Bautista	Ballad	Xclamation	
7	Telepono	One Click Straight	Alternative rock	Island Records Philippines (UMG Philippines)	
7	Bawat Saglit	Beatsilog	Alternative	KDR Music House	
7	Paano Na, Sinta?	Frank Ely, Iluna	Indie rock	Evolution Media	
7	Halimaw	Gloc-9, Abaddon, Smugglaz, Hero	Hip hop/rap	Universal Records	
7	Don't Play	Alas	Hip hop/rap	Viva Records	
7	All About Love	CK YG	Hip hop/rap	GhostWorldWide	
7	Kalaban	Dice, Omar Baliw	Hip hop/rap	6G Music	
7	Lulu and Lili	Pio Balbuena, Kierz Ferrer	Hip hop/rap	Tambay	
7	Lingi	Soulthrll	Hip hop/rap	9K Records	
7	Come Through	Matthaios	Hip hop/rap	Independent	
7	P.M.L. (Paborito Mong Love Song)	Smugglaz	Hip hop/rap	Independent	
7	Naked	Lucas Miguel	R&B/soul	Underdog Music PH	
8	Moving Closer (From the Cafe)	Felip	Pop	Warner Music Philippines	
10	Tuloy Pa Rin	Jolina Magdangal	Pop	Cornerstone Music	
10	Bestfriend	The Juans	Alternative rock	Viva Records	
10	Hidman	Abaddon (feat. Steven Peregrina)	Hip hop/rap	Sony Music Philippines	
10	Bandang Huli	Joshua Mari	Hip hop/rap	Independent	
12	Find Another Love	Leanne & Naara	Pop	Warner Music Philippines	
12	Missing Hearts	The Dawn	Rock	Sony Music Philippines	
12	18 (Dyésiotso)	Alex Bruce	Hip hop/rap	Sony Music Philippines	
13	Pangalawa	Sheryn Regis	Pop	Star Music	
13	Dalhin	Noah Raquel	Pop	Ostereo Limited	
13	Wag Ka Na Lang Kumagat	Sandwich	Rock	PolyEast Records	
13	Dating Preso	Haring Manggi Miguelito Malakas	Hip hop/rap	Mayamang Manggi Records	
13	Panalangin	Ednil Beats	Hip hop/rap	Million Racks Records	
13	Blink Twice	Bini	P-pop	Star Music	
14	Nagmamahal Lang Ako	KZ Tandingan	Pop	Star Music	
14	Handa Na Ako	Atasha Muhlach	Pop	Vicor Music	
14	Kung Masasaktan Lang	Brianna Bunagan	Pop	GMA Playlist	
14	Puso-Puso (Album)	Fred Engay	Pop	Orieland	
14	Isang Daang Porsyento	Berto	Pop	Fascination St. Records	
14	Pantasya	Marion Talavera	Pop	Offshore Music; Sony Music Philippines	
14	Suyen Imnida (EP)	Suyen	Alternative	PolyEast Records	
14	His Name	Pixie Labrador	Alternative folk	Offshore Music; Sony Music Philippines	
14	Close to You	Orange and Lemons	Alternative rock	Lilystars Records	
14	Oh, Irog	12th Street	Indie rock	O/C Records	
14	No Snitches	Shanti Dope, Hellmerry	Hip hop/rap	Universal Records	
14	Malayo	Midnasty	Hip hop/rap	Warner Music Philippines	
14	Pinagtagpo	Alisson Shore	Hip hop/rap	Labyrinth Records	
14	Kindat	Ayaka, Beatrice Mariel, Odri	Hip hop/rap	FlipMusic Records	
14	Hue (Album)	4200Southville	Hip hop/rap	Independent	
14	Amore	Jerome Banaay	Hip hop/rap	Independent	
14	Baby Ayoko	Esseca	R&B/soul	314 Studios	
14	Enough	Quest	R&B/soul	Independent	
15	Gudds Part 2	Guddhist Gunatita	Hip hop/rap	Independent	
16	Pahinga Muna Tayo	Joshua Mari	Hip hop/rap	Independent	
19	Bulong	Jason Marvin	Pop	Waterwalk Records	
20	Paradise	Maymay Entrata	Pop	Star Music	
20	Care 4 U	Fern.	Pop	Island Records Philippines (UMG Philippines)	
21	Diving	Zack Tabudlo	Pop	Republic Records Philippines (UMG Philippines)	
21	Alinlangan	Benj Pangilinan	Pop	Sony Music Philippines	
21	Sungit	Nichimi, Drmfy	Pop	Warner Music Philippines	
21	Pagsisisi	Pastel Sky	Alternative rock	The Cozy Cove	
21	Pwede Pa Ba Akong Magmahal?	Calein	Indie rock	Independent	
21	'Di Tiyak	Project:Romeo	Indie rock	Independent	
21	Aanhin	Juan Caoile, Kyleswish, Jawz	Hip hop/rap	Viva Records	
21	Kitain Mo Ko Palihim	Cozyivy	Hip hop/rap	Sound Manila Records	
21	Like A VVs	Ghetto Gecko	Hip hop/rap	Independent	
21	Sumayaw Sumunod	Jimmy Pablo	Hip hop/rap	Independent	
21	Hindi Ka Bibitawan	Bilib	P-pop	AQ Prime Music	
21	Lenten Gospel Acclamation	Himig Heswita, Bukas Palad Music Ministry	Contemporary; Christian	Jesuit Music Ministry	
21	Tagalog Version Worship Volume 01 (EP)	Gloryfall	Christian; Contemporary worship	Waterwalk Records	
22	CUH (Album)	Kristina Dawn	R&B/soul	Downtown Q' Entertainment	
24	Gets Better	Jay R, Jeremy Passion	R&B/soul	Homeworkz Entertainment Services	
26	Cake	Any Name's Okay	Alternative pop	Sony Music Philippines	
26	'Sapababy	Zae	Hip hop/rap	Independent	
27	Biniverse (EP)	Bini	P-pop	Star Music	
28	Maghintay	Jao	Pop	PolyEast Records	
28	'Di Mawari	Patrick Hizon, Yden	Pop	PH Records	
28	Honey	Doughbaby, Rees Gonzales	Pop	Unstable Entertainment	
28	I'll Be Happy When	Lyn Lapid	Pop	Mercury Records (UMG Philippines)	
28	Salungat	Chrstn	Pop	O/C Records	
28	Let Me Down Easy	Mitzi Josh	Pop	GMA Playlist	
28	'Di Na Kailangan	The Agadiers	Rock	The Cozy Cove	
28	What Comes After (EP)	Better Days	Rock	Universal Records	
28	Boomerang	Blaster Silonga	Alternative rock	Island Records Philippines (UMG Philippines)	
28	Balang Araw	Similar Sky	Indie rock	The Cozy Cove	
28	What Could've Been	Chezka	Indie folk	Underdog Music PH	
28	CZ	Brgr, Costa Cashman	Hip hop/rap	Sony Music Philippines	
28	Anino	Ramdiss, Hero	Hip hop/rap	Universal Records	
28	Haring Almighty (Album)	Bugoy na Koykoy	Hip hop/rap	2 Joints Enterprises	
28	Kung Ganito	Robledo Timido	Hip hop/rap	RealWrld	
28	Melodyssey (Album)	Jose At Melodiya	Hip hop/rap	Independent	
28	"Dam"	SB19	P-pop	Sony Music Philippines	
28	Wala Nang Iba (Soul version)	1st.One	P-pop	Warner Music Philippines	
28	Dedma	AJAA	P-pop	Cornerstone Music	
28	Kailan	Daydream	P-pop	Underdog Music PH	
28	Por Favor	Ian Sndrz, Small ToK, Naama Tov	Club/EDM	Youth Elevate	

==== March ====
Date	Single / album	Artist(s)	Genre(s)	Label(s)	Ref.
1	Place Me with Your Son (Album)	Himig Heswita	Contemporary; Christian	Jesuit Music Ministry	
1	Saloobin	Joshua Mari	Hip hop/rap	Independent	
4	Sooo Fine	Ludwig Saldaña	R&B/soul	Independent	
5	Tumesting Ka	Costa Cashman	Hip hop/rap	Independent	
5	Kahapon (Part 2)	A$tro	Hip hop/rap	Independent	
7	Hanapin Ang Sarili	Morissette	Pop	Culturtain Musicat Productions	
7	Reyna	Michelle Dee	Pop	Star Music	
7	FR FR	Chloe SJ	Pop	Star Music	
7	Bida	Jayda Avanzado	Pop	Republic Records Philippines (UMG Philippines)	
7	Babytawan	JC Regino	Pop	GMA Music	
7	Sa Bawat Sandali	Ashtine Olviga	Pop	Viva Records	
7	7th Sense (Album)	Mrld	Pop	O/C Records	
7	Mga Kaibigan	Noah Alejandre	Pop	Evolution Media	
7	Bintana	Liel	Indie pop	Unstable Entertainment	
7	Taksil	Gloc-9, Abbadon	Hip hop/rap	Universal Records	
7	SPG	JP Bacallan, Hulyo	Hip hop/rap	Rawstarr Records; Sony Music Philippines	
7	Maglasing	J-King	Hip hop/rap	Wild Kings	
7	Para Sa'yo (Last Song 4 U)	Kris Delano	Hip hop/rap	Blanktapes	
7	Lala	Matthaios	Hip hop/rap	Independent	
7	Shhh	Jerome Banaay, Ash'D	Hip hop/rap	Independent	
7	Top	Bini	P-pop	Star Music	
7	Pa-Pa-Pa-Palaban	G22	P-pop	Republic Records Philippines (UMG Philippines)	
7	Yumi & The Apocalypse	SOS	Alternative	Careless Music	
9	Sikat Ang Pinoy	Darren Espanto, Julie Anne San Jose	Pop	Star Music	
10	Parang Ayaw Ko Na	Joshua Mari	Hip hop/rap	Independent	
12	GODSPEED (HIGH ELO)	Katsy Lee, Mark Thompson	Club/EDM	Independent	
13	Kulang Na Kulang	Luna and Apollo	Indie rock	Independent	
13	Arch	Lightskeen Baby	Hip hop/rap	Global Noir	
14	Numbers	KZ Tandingan	Pop	Star Music	
14	Tag-init	Marlo Mortel	Pop	Star Music	
14	Nandito Lang Ako	Jojo Mendrez	Pop	Star Music	
14	Larawan	Rangel	Pop	Warner Music Philippines	
14	Masterpiece	Malena Leonard	Pop	GMA Playlist	
14	Dito Ka Muna	Day One	Pop	The Cozy Cove	
14	Meet Me There (Album)	Eda	Pop	Independent	
14	Blinders (Album)	Kim Trinidad	Pop	Independent	
14	Tayo	Healy After Dark	Indie pop	O/C Records	
14	Dulo	Dream Seven	Rock	The Cozy Cove	
14	Ano Ba Talaga?	Carousel Casualties	Alternative rock	Offshore Music; Sony Music Philippines	
14	No Sleep	Shanti Dope	Hip hop/rap	Universal Records	
14	Backshots (Album)	Waiian	Hip hop/rap	Sony Music Philippines	
14	Palusot	Bert Symoun, Jadboii	Hip hop/rap	Unstable Records	
14	45 Bars	Pio Balbuena	Hip hop/rap	Independent	
14	BGYO (EP)	BGYO	P-pop	Star Music	
14	Tabi-tabi	Vxon	P-pop	Cornerstone Music	
14	Umaapoy	Fado, Aliyah Buenaventura	Electronic	Fado Productions	
14	Diyos ng Pag-asa	Hangad	Contemporary; Christian	Jesuit Music Ministry	
15	Bulletproof	Sica	Hip hop/rap	Greenhouse Records	
17	Tanging Ikaw	Joshua Mari	Hip hop/rap	Independent	
17	Chamba	Paul Eyy	Hip hop/rap	Independent	
18	Biktima	Chicosci	Alternative rock	Tower of Doom Music	
19	Sa Susunod sa Akin	Nica del Rosario	Pop	FlipMusic Records	
20	Plain Tee	Thugsta, Costa Cashman	Hip hop/rap	Independent	
20	4Ever U	Sawndass Music, Jr Crown, Honcho	Hip hop/rap	Independent	
21	Feels Like It's the End of the Line	Kean Cipriano, Ice Seguerra	Pop	O/C Records	
21	Pag-ibig ng Ikaw at Ako	Earl Agustin	Pop	Vicor Music	
21	Nonchalant	Chloe SJ	Pop	Star Music	
21	Para Pilitin Ka	Jikamarie, Skusta Clee	Pop	Warner Music Philippines	
21	To the Girl I Used to Know	Reanne Borela	Pop	Warner Music Philippines	
21	Funny	Ena Mori	Pop	Offshore Music; Sony Music Philippines	
21	SSS (Stuck Song)	Shanni	Pop	Sony Music Philippines	
21	Kabanata (EP)	Jao	Pop	PolyEast Records	
21	Love You Bad	Kylix	Pop	Universal Records	
21	Ulitin Ang Minsan	El Gardo, Rees Gonzales	Pop	Independent	
21	Pag Kailangan Mo	Jemay Santiago	Pop	Independent	
21	Namimiss	Frank Ely	Pop	Evolution Media	
21	Ipagpatawad Mo	Ame	Alternative rock	Evolution Media	
21	Tama Na	Modern Day Dream	Alternative rock	Independent	
21	Sobrang Sungit	Zo zo	Hip hop/rap	Viva Records	
21	Patalikod	Dreycruz, Teys, E-kove	Hip hop/rap	Unstable Records	
21	Meron Daw Bago	Kiddotin	Hip hop/rap	RealWrld	
21	200K	Eno	Hip hop/rap	Independent	
21	Alam Mo Ba?	1st.One	P-pop	Warner Music Philippines	
21	Panginoon, Kaawaan Mo Kami	Hangad	Contemporary; Christian	Jesuit Music Ministry	
21	Reaches Out (Album)	Pippen	Christian	Star Music	
22	Tugatog	Mike Kosa, Ian Angeles	Hip hop/rap	Independent	
23	Oo	Abaddon, Ms Yumi	Hip hop/rap	Sony Music Philippines	
26	Sandali	Diego Gutierrez	Pop	Sony Music Philippines	
26	Kaswal (EP)	Sandwich	Rock	PolyEast Records	
28	Ayos Lang	Janine Berdin	Pop	Island Records Philippines (UMG Philippines)	
28	Kilala	Ace Banzuelo	Pop	Sony Music Philippines	
28	Someome (EP)	Pixie Labrador	Pop	Offshore Music; Sony Music Philippines	
28	K	Eliza Maturan	Pop	Unstable Entertainment	
28	Just Flex	Elise Huang	Pop	Underdog Music PH	
28	Death Wish	Lyn Lapid	Pop	Mercury Records (UMG Philippines)	
28	Titingin-tingin	Sitti	Bossa nova	Icons Music	
28	It Was A Moment (Album)	SOS	Alternative	Careless Music	
28	Akin Ka Lang	5th String	Alternative	Enterphil Entertainment	
28	Tadhana	Magiliw Street	Alternative rock	The Cozy Cove	
28	C Me	Robledo Timido, Fern.	Hip hop/rap	RealWrld	
28	Playaz and Pimps (Album)	Young Blood Neet, Bugoy na Koykoy	Hip hop/rap	Independent	
28	Karmen	Zae	Hip hop/rap	Independent	
28	Toktok	1096 Gang	Hip hop/rap	Independent	
28	Tanga	Kaia	P-pop	Sony Music Philippines	
28	Pansamantala	Press Hit Play	P-pop	Sony Music Philippines	
28	Ama Namin	Hangad	Christian	Jesuit Music Ministry	

=== Second quarter ===
==== April ====
Date	Single / album	Artist(s)	Genre(s)	Label(s)	Ref.
1	Sa'kin Ka Tumingin	Haring Manggi	Hip hop/rap	Independent	
2	Milagro	Kai Buizon	Pop	Sony Music Philippines	
2	Sabi Ko Na	Yara	P-pop	Sony Music Philippines	
2	Dance With My Mistakes	Lola Amour	Alternative	Warner Music Philippines	
3	Dapitan	Chndtr	Alternative rock	EMI Records (UMG Philippines)	
4	Internet	Chezka	Pop	Underdog Music PH	
4	Kinakabahan	Lily	Rock	UMG Philippines	
4	B-sides and Rarities Vol. II (Album)	Mayonnaise	Rock	Independent	
4	Ambag	Gloc-9, Shockra	Hip hop/rap	Universal Records	
4	Gasiga	Midnasty	Hip hop/rap	Warner Music Philippines	
4	Tumba	Rajondo	Hip hop/rap	Unstable Records	
4	MMK	Huni	R&B/soul	Underdog Music PH	
4	PLS	SY•NC	P-pop	Underdog Music PH	
5	'Di Na	Chryzquin Yu	Pop	Blvck Entertainment	
7	Kung Nasaan Ka Man	Joshua Mari	Hip hop/rap	Independent	
8	'Nung Ako'y Nakakulong	Haring Manggi Miguelito Malakas	Hip hop/rap	Independent	
9	Frizzle Anne (EP)	Frizzle Anne	Pop	Independent	
10	Black Civic	Jeko Royo	Hip hop/rap	Dollar Records	
10	Eva't Adan	Nobb	Hip hop/rap	Independent	
11	Umawit Ka (Pop version)	Morissette, Rachel Alejandro	Pop	Culturtain Musicat Productions	
11	When She Cries	Nasser	Pop	Curve Entertainment	
11	Balang Araw	JC Herrero	Alternative	Warner Music Philippines	
11	Saranggola	Ben&Ben	Alternative folk	Sony Music Philippines	
11	Liwanag	Sponge Cola	Rock	Sony Music Philippines	
11	Tunay	Shanti Dope	Hip hop/rap	Universal Records	
11	Fresh	Playertwo	Hip hop/rap	Warner Music Philippines	
11	Best Seller (Album)	Ex Battalion	Hip hop/rap	Ex Battalion Music	
11	Natural	Teys	Hip hop/rap	Independent	
11	Modernong Punk	Ghetto Gecko	Hip hop/rap	Independent	
11	Sapulso (EP)	1621	P-pop	Star Music	
12	Misa ng Pag-asa (Album)	Hangad	Christian	Jesuit Music Ministry	
12	Champagne	CK YG, Paris	Hip hop/rap	GhostWorldwide	
12	Panahon	Guddhist Gunatita	Hip hop/rap	Independent	
13	OTW	Shaira	Bangsamoro pop	AHS Productions	
14	U Yeah	Grin Department	Reggae	Independent	
16	Blessings	RJ dela Fuente, Gary Valenciano	Inspirational	Manila Genesis Entertainment; Waterwalk Records	
16	Save Point	Katsy Lee	Club/EDM	Independent	
17	Sa Dapit-hapon	Young Voices of the Philippines	Contemporary; Christian	Jesuit Music Ministry	
18	Little Sunny Baby	Ena Mori	Pop	Offshore Music; Sony Music Philippines	
18	Need Ya	Realest Cram, Young Blood Neet	Hip hop/rap	GhostWorldwide	
18	Mahal Ko	Calein	Hip hop/rap	Independent	
20	Parang Mamamatay	Apekz	Hip hop/rap	Independent	
20	MSK	Kjwan	Rock	Independent	
20	Hope in the Precious Cross	Exalt Worship	Contemporary; Christian	CCF Media	
21	Kandila	Morobeats, JMara	Hip hop/rap	Independent	
21	Sa Piling Niya	Joshua Mari	Hip hop/rap	Independent	
23	Love the Chase	James Reid	Pop	Sony Music Philippines	
23	Nahanap Kita	Amiel Sol	Pop	Ivory Music and Video	
25	PDKL	Arthur Miguel	Pop	Warner Music Philippines	
25	Being With You	Angeline Quinto	Pop	Universal Records	
25	M.K.S	Will Mikhael	Pop	Universal Records	
25	Beautiful Girls	Fern.	Pop	Island Records Philippines (UMG Philippines)	
25	Sumayaw	Never the Strangers	Pop	Island Records Philippines (UMG Philippines)	
25	Buzzkill (Album)	Lyn Lapid	Pop	Mercury Records (UMG Philippines)	
25	Madapaka	Kim Molina	Pop	Viva Records	
25	Naiilang	Le John	Pop	Moody Music Company	
25	Kunwari Lang	Zephanie	Pop	Cornerstone Music	
25	Peace of Mind	Darla Baltazar	Pop	Wings Music Group	
25	Sarap Angkinin	Earl Generao	Pop	Yellow Room Music	
25	Pasa Pasa	Andrej Agas	Pop	Agas Music	
25	Bakit Ganon Lang Kadali	Jemay Santiago	Pop	Independent	
25	Swabe (EP)	Various artists	Pop, R&B/soul	Viva Records; Vicor Music; Ivory Music and Video	
25	Topak	Kiss N Tell	Alternative pop	Soupstar Music	
25	Lonely Hearts (EP)	Banda ni Kleggy	Rock	Soupstar Music; Warner Music Philippines	
25	Ano Ba Talaga Tayo?	The Juans	Pop rock	Viva Records	
25	Sagad	Silent Sanctuary	Alternative rock	Universal Records	
25	Ako Pa Ba O Hindi?	Allmo$t, Cien	Hip hop/rap	Viva Records	
25	Makasama Sandali	Robledo Timido, Elhé	Hip hop/rap	RealWrld	
25	BWYB	Shnti, Zae	Hip hop/rap	Independent	
25	Sugal	Jeff Grecia	Hip hop/rap	Independent	
25	Back to Bliss	Kyla	R&B/soul	Star Music	
25	Keep Going	Matthaios	R&B/soul	Independent	
25	Arise	Gloryfall	Contemporary; Christian	Waterwalk Records	
25	Simula at Wakas (EP)	SB19	P-pop	Sony Music Philippines	
25	Para Sa Iyo	6ense	P-pop	Sony Music Philippines	
25	Sh*t Sobrang Init	Vxon	P-pop	Cornerstone Music	
29	Manloloko	Zack Tabudlo	Pop	Republic Records Philippines (UMG Philippines)	
29	Whiskey	I Belong to the Zoo	Alternative rock	Independent	
30	Puso	Rob Deniel	Pop	Vicor Music	
30	Kape	Magnus Haven	Alternative rock	Vicor Music	
30	Frosty Temperature (Album)	Bugoy na Koykoy	Hip hop/rap	2 Joints Enterprises	
30	Back on My Chest Coast Sh!t (EP)	Lightskeen Baby	Hip hop/rap	Global Noir	
30	4 A.M.	2Icey, Brgr	Hip hop/rap	Independent	

==== May ====
Date	Single / album	Artist(s)	Genre(s)	Label(s)	Ref.
1	SunBright	True Faith	Alternative	Independent	
1	May Nanalo Na	Loonie, Frizzle Anne	Hip hop/rap	Independent	
1	Gumamellow (EP)	Cianne Dominguez	Soul, Acoustic, Mellow	Starpop Artist	
2	Ina	Dia Maté, Regine Velasquez	Pop	Radical Music	
2	Walls	Yumi Lacsamana	Pop	Star Music	
2	Pambihira	Kiyo, Zild Benitez	Pop	Independent	
2	Ikaw, ikaw, Ikaw	Icebox, Eliza Maturan	Pop	Unstable Entertainment	
2	Dahan Dahan	Paolo Santos	Pop	Evolution Media	
2	Bitin	Over October	Alternative rock	Underdog Music PH	
2	Akala Ko	Blaster Silonga	Alternative rock	Island Records Philippines (UMG Philippines)	
2	Isang Libong Araw	Mondo	Alternative folk	Independent	
2	O.A.D.	Orca	Metalcore	Independent	
2	Korona	Jr Crown	Hip hop/rap	Sony Music Philippines	
2	Lambingan Na This	Ryannah J, Kiyo	R&B/soul	O/C Records	
2	Tayo	KV	R&B/soul	Everything Entertainment	
4	Bomba Na	Jae Bourgeoisie	Hip hop/rap	Dream Records	
5	Slidin'	Realest Cram, Enzo MF, Ohthreesosa, YB Neet	Hip hop/rap	GhostWorldwide	
5	Ako Dapat	One Verse	P-pop	PH Entertainment	
7	We Need 2 Talk	Praceful Gemini, Waiian	Hip hop/rap	Sony Music Philippines	
7	Kasama Ka	Raven	Hip hop/rap	Sony Music Philippines	
8	Pag-ibig Na Walang Hanggan	EJ de Perio	Pop	Sony Music Philippines	
8	Huwag Sana Kayong Magkita (Album)	Allegra	R&B/soul	Independent	
9	Ahon	December Avenue, Morissette	Pop	Tower of Doom Music	
9	Lahat Ay Kayang Gawin	Regine Velasquez	Pop	Star Music	
9	Parking Lot	Jeremy Glinoga, Darren Cashwell, Chie Filomeno	Pop	Star Music	
9	Chloe Angeleigh...For Real (EP)	Chloe SJ	Pop	Star Music	
9	Aking Mithiin	Shane G	Pop	Sony Music Philippines	
9	Hele	Toneejay	Indie pop	Marilag Recordings International	
9	Hingalo	Jan Roberts, Shirebound	Alternative pop	Warner Music Philippines	
9	Magmahalan	The Agadiers	Alternative rock	The Cozy Cove	
9	Sabang	Akong Ayalam	Folk	FlipMusic Records	
9	Kuya Cesar	Gloc-9, Astro, Abaddon	Hip hop/rap	Universal Records	
9	Tribute to Thyself (Album)	Midnasty	Hip hop/rap	Warner Music Philippines	
9	10 Over 10	Teys, Leks, Sano GZ, Lamanila	Hip hop/rap	Unstable Entertainment	
9	Dalawa Tayo	Unotheone	Hip hop/rap	Independent	
9	Masyadong In-Love (Album)	Juan Caoile	R&B/soul	Viva Records	
9	The Baddest	Russell!, Illest Morena	R&B/soul	Public Records Ltd.	
9	Hanggang Sa Huli	Bukas Palad Music Ministry	Christian	Jesuit Music Ministry	
10	Sugod	JMara	Hip hop/rap	Independent	
11	Ginto	Honcho	Hip hop/rap	DeeFyre Records	
11	Isasayaw Kita	Hannah Coscos	Lullaby	Jesuit Music Ministry	
12	Lasting Moments (The Soundtrack) (EP)	Keiko Necesario	Pop	Passion5	
12	LNP	Sponge Cola	Rock	Sony Music Philippines	
15	Bahala Ka	Jnkse	R&B/soul	Independent	
15	Inggit Ka Lang	Rish Mel, Kingpilz, Diggz	Hip hop/rap	Million Racks Records	
16	Pikit Mata	Janine	Pop	Vicor Music	
16	Nanghininayang	Sam Mangubat, Niel Murillo	Pop	Dreamzone	
16	Hindi Pa Rin Sapat	Jennylyn Mercado	Pop	Star Music	
16	Christopher Sommereux (EP)	Christopher Sommereux	Pop	Star Music	
16	'Pag Tinadhana (Album)	Zsa Zsa Padilla	Pop	Star Music	
16	Exclusively	Fly Mama!	Alternative pop	Independent	
16	Superman	Sid Lily	Alternative pop	Independent	
16	Palapit Sa Ü	Geiko	Indie pop	Independent	
16	Flying Kiss	Dilaw	Rock	Warner Music Philippines	
16	Sa'n Ka Pupunta?	The Dawn	Rock	Sony Music Philippines	
16	Vitamin B9	Wilabaliw	Rock	Independent	
16	Kasama	Brisom	Synth	The Cozy Cove	
16	Kuluhanin Ko	Shanti Dope	Hip hop/rap	Universal Records	
16	'06 Mike Baby	PJ Katana, GA Chillerong Ghetto	Hip hop/rap	Viva Records	
16	Ilan Ba Lalake Mo?	Kiddotin	Hip hop/rap	RealWrld	
16	Kalye	A$tro	Hip hop/rap	TMP Industries	
16	Ikaw Lang	Jerome Banaay	R&B/soul	Independent	
17	'Di Ko Na Kaya (Rap Version)	Team Sekai	Hip hop/rap	Independent	
17	O Therese Pinakamamahal	Darwin Lomentigar	Contemporary; Christian	Jesuit Music Ministry	
20	Ikigai	Dionela (feat. Loonie)	R&B/soul	EMI Records (UMG Philippines)	
21	Pampatinde	Lil-P, Badge, Righteous One	Hip hop/rap	Fast Lane Records	
22	How the Heart Breaks	Any Name's Okay	Alternative rock	Sony Music Philippines	
22	Ako/Tayo	Marlon Talavera	Pop	Sony Music Philippines	
22	Akin	Figvres	Indie rock	Independent	
23	CRASHED EP '97 (EP)	Razorblackman	Punk rock	Square Mushroom	
23	Pwede Bang Mamaya	Angela Ken	Pop	Tarsier Records	
23	JEN (EP)	Jennylyn Mercado	Pop	Star Music	
23	Nasusunog	Dwta	Pop	Sony Music Philippines	
23	Nahihiya	Primo.io	Pop	Land of Misfits	
23	Huling Pag-ibig	Mark Carpio	Pop	Independent	
23	Pagtingin	DaivJstn	Pop	Independent	
23	O' Kay Tamis	It All Started in May	Alternative pop	Universal Records	
23	Sa Madaling Araw	Hilera	Rock	Yellow Room Music Philippines	
23	If You're Not Mine	12th Street	Indie rock	O/C Records	
23	Last Fool Show (Album)	Blaster Silonga	Alternative rock	Island Records Philippines (UMG Philippines)	
23	Katood ni Ina	Bukas Palad Music Ministry	Contemporary; Christian	Jesuit Music Ministry	
23	Ikaw Sana	OLG Zack, Realest Cram	Hip hop/rap	GhostWorldwide	
23	Ako Bahala	Ron David, Dyco	Hip hop/rap	Realwrld	
23	Poksa	Jeff Grecia, Ishad	Hip hop/rap	Independent	
24	OTW	VVS Collective	Hip hop/rap	Independent	
25	Therapist	Dello	Hip hop/rap	Sony Music Philippines	
25	Huling Ednis	Gat Putch	Hip hop/rap	Greenhouse Records	
25	AA	Yuridope	Hip hop/rap	The Dope Music	
25	Can't Wait For Tomorrow	Nix Damn P	EDM	Plural Music	
27	Hardin	Luna and Apollo, Fred Engay	Pop	Independent	
28	Abi	Arron Rebustes, Jao	Pop	PolyEast Records	
28	Ulan	Tothapi	Alternative pop	Sony Music Philippines	
28	Daming Dahilan	Joshua Mari	Hip hop/rap	Independent	
29	Dalagang Inosente	Nateman	Hip hop/rap	HTRB Records	
29	Hey Girl	Raf Davis	Hip hop/rap	The Real Deal	
30	Cutterpillow Tribute (Album)	Various artists	Pop, Rock, OPM	Offshore Music; Sony Music Philippines	
30	Come at Me	Monique de los Santos, Ron Henley, Miaow	Pop	Warner Music Philippines	
30	1000 Days	Ferdinand Aragon	Pop	Warner Music Philippines	
30	B Luvd (EP)	Rain Celmar	Pop	Star Music	
30	Rainbow	Krishnah Gravidez	Pop	Universal Records	
30	Gently	Chezka	Pop	Underdog Music PH	
30	Hanggang Tumanda	Daniel Paringit	Pop	EMI Records (UMG Philippines)	
30	Altar	Daryl Ong	Pop	Independent	
30	Kung Loobin	Andrej Agas	Pop	Independent	
30	Daya Mo	Clubs, Northernoot	Indie pop	Warner Music Philippines	
30	Clue	Noel Cabangon	Folk	Icons Music; Widescope Entertainment Corporation	
30	Misbehave	Lola Amour	Alternative rock	Warner Music Philippines	
30	Walang Nagbago	Carousel Casualties	Alternative rock	Offshore Music; Sony Music Philippines	
30	Obviously	Sud	Fusion	Yellow Room Music Philippines	
30	Baby Girl	Allmo$t	Hip hop/rap	Viva Records	
30	Kusang Dumating	Robledo Timido	Hip hop/rap	RealWrld	
30	'Di Ka Kawalan	Hulyo, Vito Miranda, Yuridope	Hip hop/rap	Zypher Records	
30	Down	Nik Makino	Hip hop/rap	Independent	
30	Filipina Queen	G22	P-pop	Cornerstone Music	
30	Para Sa Bayan	Gloryfall	Contemporary; Christian	Waterwalk Records	
31	KBTHN	Ron Henley, Abra	Hip hop/rap	Independent	
31	Furr	Costa Cashman, Fern.	Hip hop/rap	Independent	
31	4 Deep No Sleep (Album)	Bugoy na Koykoy	Hip hop/rap	Independent	
31	Gang Up	Paul N Ballin', Playboy Baby, Sordan	Hip hop/rap	Rawstarr Records	

==== June ====
Date	Single / album	Artist(s)	Genre(s)	Label(s)	Ref.
1	Sayaw (EP)	Kolette	Pop	Star Music	
1	Jamsimanyo	Ney Dimaculangan	Pop, Rock	Black Sheep Manila	
4	Tandang Pananong	Flict G	Hip hop/rap	Sony Music Philippines	
4	Hindi Kita Minahal	Joshua Mari	Hip hop/rap	Independent	
4	Sabi Ko Na (Remix)	Yara	P-pop	Sony Music Philippines	
5	Shagidi	Bini	P-pop	Star Music	
5	Thirsty	Finix	P-pop	GKD Records	
5	Gwapingz	Tommie King	Hip hop/rap	Greenhouse Records	
5	Sobrang Latina	Honcho, DollaPooch	Hip hop/rap	Highlife Records	
6	JGH (Deluxe)	James Reid	Pop, R&B/soul	Careless; Sony Music Philippines	
6	Hawak Kamay	Ekai	Pop	Warner Music Philippines	
6	KIKXV: Kiko Salazar 15th Anniversary Album (Vol. 1)	Kiko Salazar	Pop	Star Music	
6	Wish You the Best	Lyka Estrella, Marielle Montillano	Pop	Star Music	
6	Alon	JL Gaspar	Pop	Universal Records	
6	Pasimple	Imago	Pop rock	Sony Music Philippines	
6	Basura	Sandwich, Suyen	Rock	PolyEast Records	
6	OTW	One Click Straight	Rock	Island Records Philippines (UMG Philippines)	
6	Anghel	Gloc-9, Abbadon, Arvy T	Hip hop/rap	Universal Records	
6	U & I	Playertwo	Hip hop/rap	Warner Music Philippines	
6	Kupido	PrettyMf9ine	Hip hop/rap	Independent	
6	Rainbow	GAT	P-pop	Ivory Music and Video	
6	Walkie Talkie	Ziv, Kaia	P-pop	Sony Music Philippines	
6	We Shout For Joy	Bukas Palad Music Ministry	Contemporary; Christian	Jesuit Music Ministry	
8	Para Tayo Sa Huli	Onin Musika	Alternative pop	Independent	
10	Pagod sa Pahinga	Mike Kosa	Hip hop/rap	Independent	
12	Mhine	Repablikan, Jslim (feat. Ms Yumi)	Hip hop/rap	Sony Music Philippines	
12	QC Gurlz Remix	Stef Aranas (feat. Sassa Gurl)	Hip hop/rap	Offshore Music; Sony Music Philippines	
12	HUH	Lightskeen Baby	Hip hop/rap	Global Noir	
13	Kahel na Langit	Maki	Pop	Tarsier Records	
13	Himig at Pag-ibig (Album)	Earl Agustin	Pop	Vicor Music	
13	Papunta Na Ako/Gustong Gusto	Maven	Pop	Star Music	
13	Magbago	Timmy Cruz	Pop	Star Music	
13	Tayo Hanggang Dulo	Fyang Smith, JM Ibarra	Pop	Star Music	
13	Blind	Gabo Gatdula	Indie pop	O/C Records	
13	Puso	Paham	Alternative rock	Off the Record; Sony Music Philippines	
13	Paasa	The 12/21	Punk rock	Black Sheep Manila	
13	Hilum (Malinong nga Kaisog)	Rees Gonzales	Visayan	Unstable Records	
13	Unsa Ta	Angelo Rudy	Visayan	Independent	
13	Pusher	Shanti Dope	Hip hop/rap	Universal Records	
13	I'm A Vibe	Teys, Sano GZ	Hip hop/rap	Unstable Entertainment	
13	Walang Alangan	Poly Gy	Hip hop/rap	Xclusive Collective	
13	Inaalala	Lua$	Hip hop/rap	Independent	
13	One Night	SJ Maglana	R&B/soul	Independent	
13	Marikit	GAT	P-pop	Ivory Music and Video	
13	Father of Heavenly Lights	Gloryfall	Contemporary; Christian	Waterwalk Records	
14	What It Do?	Fern, Costa Cashman	Hip hop/rap	Island Records Philippines (UMG Philippines)	
16	Gemini	Because	Hip hop/rap	Viva Records	
17	Pakita Mo Sa Akin	Jay R, Illest Morena	R&B/soul	Homeworkz Entertainment Services	
17	Fullest	Dello, Cursebox	Hip hop/rap	Sony Music Philippines	
18	Kung Ikaw Ay Masaya	Dwta	Pop	Sony Music Philippines	
19	Buti 'Di Ka Nanatili	Realest Cram, CK YG, Nateman	Hip hop/rap	GhostWorldwide	
19	Kung Magkikitang Muli	Repablikan (feat. Liriko)	Hip hop/rap	Sony Music Philippines	
19	Kahit Ganyan Ka	Rish Mel, Ednil Beats	Hip hop/rap	Million Racks Records	
19	Click Click Boom	Finix	P-pop	GKD Records	
20	Tayo Lang	Janine Berdin, Illest Morena, Fana	Pop	Island Records Philippines (UMG Philippines)	
20	Bihag	Never the Strangers	Pop	Island Records Philippines (UMG Philippines)	
20	Sink	Ena Mori	Pop	Offshore Music; Sony Music Philippines	
20	Sandali	John Sam	Pop	Offshore Music; Sony Music Philippines	
20	Forever Fyang (EP)	Fyang Smith	Pop	Star Music	
20	Kabit	Dom Guyot	Pop	Sony Music Philippines	
20	Sweet Tangerine	Ysabelle, Patrick Hizon	Pop	PH Records	
20	Mapayapang Mundo	Esang de Torres	Pop	Saturno Music	
20	Lumulutang, Nahuhulog	Yeng Constantino	Pop	Independent	
20	Nananaginip ng Gising	Paolo Santos, Mela	Pop	Independent	
20	Darating Din	Trisha Macapagal	Pop	The Cozy Cove	
20	Bumabalik	Healy After Dark	Indie pop	O/C Records	
20	Walang Kaba	Marina Summers	Drag	Sony Music Philippines	
20	All My Time	Cliff	R&B/soul	Warner Music Philippines	
20	Pano	Gloc-9	Hip hop/rap	Independent	
20	Windows Down	Jeff Grecia	Hip hop/rap	Independent	
20	Nahanap Din Kita	Quest	R&B/soul	Independent	
22	Gugmang Preso	Loonie	Hip hop/rap	Independent	
23	Parachute	Mikey Bustos	Pop	Independent	
24	She Wanna Get Numb	Gat Putch	Hip hop/rap	Greenhouse Records	
24	Baby Mixtape 4 (EP)	Lightskeen Baby	Hip hop/rap	Global Noir	
26	BTRN (Beterano)	Repablikan	Hip hop/rap	Sony Music Philippines	
27	Superdiva	Vice Ganda, Regine Velasquez	Pop	Star Music	
27	Minsan Lang Kita Iibigin	Jason Dy	Pop	Star Music	
27	Kaileidoscope (Album)	Kai Montinola	Pop	Star Music	
27	JMielle in Love (EP)	JM dela Cerna, Marielle Montillano	Pop	Star Music	
27	Favorite Friend	Jolianne	Pop	Careless; Sony Music Philippines	
27	Sulyap Mo Lang	Ronnie Liang	Pop	RL Music	
27	Magkasintahan	Leila	Pop	Yellow Room Music; Sony Music Philippines	
27	No Turning Back	Joey Generoso	Pop	Icons Music	
27	Sana Nandito Ka	Jeniffer Maravilla	Pop	GMA Playlist	
27	Para Bago	The Vowels They Orbit	Pop rock	Sony Music Philippines	
27	Kaibigang Matalik	Giniling Festival	Rock	Independent	
27	Nung Ika'y Nawala	Letter Day Story	Alternative pop	Independent	
27	Pasado	It All Started in May	Alternative pop	Universal Records	
27	OTW/Broke (EP)	One Click Straight	Alternative rock	Island Records Philippines (UMG Philippines)	
27	'Yan Ang Hirap Sa'yo (Album)	Kiddotin	Hip hop/rap	RealWrld	
27	Tunay	Kuya Bryan	Hip hop/rap	KB Records	
27	5	Kael Guerrero, Yuridope	Hip hop/rap	Isosceles Records	
27	Or Nah	Rajondo	Hip hop/rap	Unstable Records	
27	Way Back Home	Lua$	Hip hop/rap	Independent	
28	Shelter of the Broken	Ice Seguerra	Pop	Star Music	

=== Third quarter ===
==== July ====
Date	Single / album	Artist(s)	Genre(s)	Label(s)	Ref.
2	Malakas Lang Ang Matitira	Haring Manggi	Hip hop/rap	Mayamang Manggi Records	
3	Hi Mary	Kingpilz, Ednil Beats	Hip hop/rap	Million Racks Records	
3	Sumugal Sa Akin	Finix	P-pop	GKD Records	
4	I'm Okay	Moira Dela Torre (feat. Ben&Ben)	Pop	Republic Records Philippines (UMG Philippines)	
4	Mapasakin Ka	Sam Concepcion, Moira Dela Torre	Pop	Universal Records	
4	Life at 29	Leanne & Naara	Pop	Warner Music Philippines	
4	Hindi Ko Alam	Jed Madela	Pop	Star Music	
4	Ipagbukas	Jason Dy	Pop	Star Music	
4	Ikaw Pa Rin (Album)	Darren Espanto	Pop	Star Music	
4	Hanap	David La Sol	Pop	The Cozy Cove	
4	Tahan Na, Tahanan	Matt Wilson	Pop	Wild Dream Records	
4	Pagbigyan	Carl Beley	Pop	Unstable Entertainment	
4	Huling Hantungan	Yves Villamor	Pop	Xclamation	
4	Be Alright	Issa Rodriguez	Pop	Underdog Music PH	
4	Kung Hindi Na Kaya	Poppert Bernadas, Paolo Benjamin	Pop	Independent	
4	N.D.N.G.	Jay Abordo	Indie pop	Mabuhay Music Group	
4	So Far Away (And Out of Sight)	Hale	Alternative rock	EMI Records (UMG Philippines)	
4	Para Nimo	Oh! Caraga	Visayan rock	Independent	
4	BLGBGN	Gloc-9, Abaddon	Hip hop/rap	Universal Records	
4	Himala	Dreycruz, JeryC	Hip hop/rap	Unstable Entertainment	
4	Ready	Erik Villanueva	R&B/soul	Mabuhay Music Group	
4	Dapat Lang Ako Lang	Vxon	P-pop	Cornerstone Music	
5	Senyas	Gat Putch, Matteyo	Hip hop/rap	Greenhouse Records	
10	Ella	Marlon Talavera	Pop	Offshore Music; Sony Music Philippines	
10	Tulala	Vvink	P-pop	FlipMusic Records	
11	Home	Justin Vasquez	Pop	Republic Records Philippines (UMG Philippines)	
11	Magic	Jason Dhakal	Pop	Warner Music Philippines	
11	Babalik	Keanna Mag	Pop	Vicor Music	
11	Sikretong Tayo Lang May Alam	Shanni	Pop	Sony Music Philippines	
11	So Safe	Elise Huang	Pop	Underdog Music PH	
11	Bawat Araw Mas Mahal Kita	Hey Its Je	Pop	Independent	
11	Tulad ng Dati	Jemay Santiago	Pop	Independent	
11	Upside Down	Iiicccyyy	Indie pop	Filla Killa Records	
11	Ano Ba Talaga Tayo?	The Juans (feat. Janine Berdin)	Pop rock	Viva Records	
11	Drama Queen TV (Album)	Kitchie Nadal	Pop rock	Independent	
11	Alay Kapwa	Ben&Ben	Alternative folk	Star Music	
11	Tabe	Nik Makino, Robledo Timido	Hip hop/rap	Diamond Squid	
11	Pahingi	Lua$	Hip hop/rap	Independent	
11	HSP	Purples n' Oranges	R&B/soul	Independent	
14	Ohh La La/Señorita	Wrive	P-pop	Star Music	
15	Summer Dream	Miguel Escueta	Pop	Independent	
16	Aura	IV of Spades	Pop rock	Sony Music Philippines	
17	Ego	Jay R, Jay Chan, Sen Peders, Soup Pha	R&B/soul	Homeworkz Entertainment Services	
18	Joaquin	Jireh Lim	Pop	Warner Music Philippines	
18	Ano Na?	Rhodessa	Pop	Viva Records	
18	The World is so Small (After All) (Album)	Paolo Sandejas	Pop	Sony Music Philippines	
18	LT. Butterfly	Denice Lao, Fref Engay, Rise High	Pop	Passion Sampler	
18	Banana Milk	Rees Gonzales, Lois	Pop	Unstable Entertainment	
18	Ngalan Mo	Yden	Pop	Independent	
18	Sabihin Na	Dear Dahlia	Pop rock	Universal Records	
18	The Moment	Lola Amour (feat. Kokoro)	Alternative	Warner Music Philippines	
18	I Can Be the One	Zae, Sica	Hip hop/rap	Independent	
18	Yung Tipo	Zo zo	Hip hop/rap	Independent	
18	Lantad	Dyco, Robledo Timido	Hip hop/rap	RealWrld	
18	'Di Mo Sigurado	Ron David	Hip hop/rap	RealWrld	
18	On My Grind	Stef Aranas	R&B/soul	Offshore Music; Sony Music Philippines	
18	Bagong Umaga	Gloryfall	Contemporary; Christian	Waterwalk Records	
20	Rest Day II	CLR	Hip hop/rap	The Artist Co.	
24	Soundtrack sa Pelikula (EP)	Smugglaz	Hip hop/rap	Independent	
24	Thirsty (EP)	Finix	P-pop	GKD Records	
25	Ayoko Magmadali	John Roa	Pop	Viva Records	
25	KIKXV: Volume 2	Kiko Salazar	Pop	Star Music	
25	Gunita (EP)	Enzo Almario	Pop	Star Music	
25	Bato sa Buhangin	Matéo	Pop	Abyss Company	
25	Pangarap Natutupad	Liezel Garcia	Pop	Nashville Skyline Music	
25	Play With Me (Again)	Paolo Santos	Pop	Evolution Media	
25	Halina	Chrstn	Pop	O/C Records	
25	Haaayyy	Pastel Sky	Pop	The Cozy Cove	
25	Kuha Ang Inis	Robledo Timido	Hip hop/rap	RealWrld	
25	Bumalik	Lo Ki	Hip hop/rap	Viva Records	
25	Tunay	Jay R	R&B/soul	Hitmakers Entertainment	
25	One-half And	Kristina Dawn	R&B/soul	Downtown Q' Entertainment	
25	A New Song	Bukas Palad Music Ministry	Contemporary; Christian	Jesuit Music Ministry	
26	Mga Idol	Guddhist Gunatita, Nateman, Mhot	Hip hop/rap	Independent	
29	Runway	Mica Javier	R&B/soul	Jamaica LLC	
30	Umaaligid	Sarah Geronimo, SB19	Pop	Viva Records; G Productions	
30	Naguguluhan	Zack Tabudlo	Pop	Republic Records Philippines (UMG Philippines)	
30	Malalang Nilalang	Gracenote	Pop rock	EMI Records (UMG Philippines)	
30	My Day	Young Blood Neet, Realest Cram	Hip hop/rap	Independent	
31	High Altitudes (Album)	Bugoy na Koykoy	Hip hop/rap	Independent	
31	Thanks G	A$tro	Hip hop/rap	Independent	

==== August ====
Date	Single / album	Artist(s)	Genre(s)	Label(s)	Ref.
1	Sa Panaginip Na Lang	Ashtine Olviga	Pop	Viva Records	
1	Paalam	Rico Blanco	Pop	Sony Music Philippines	
1	Hala	Jerge	Pop	Evolution Media	
1	Sabihin Lang (Kung Ayaw Mo)	Kenaniah	Pop	O/C Records	
1	Misfire (EP)	Chezka	Pop	Underdog Music PH	
1	Hindi Ko Alam	Athena Gail	Pop	Underdog Music PH	
1	Ayaw Baya	Arthur Nery	Visayan	Viva Records	
1	Hindi Pala Tayo	Orient Pearl	Pop rock	Black Sheep Manila	
1	Araw-araw	Iluna	Alternative rock	Independent	
1	Mahal Kita	MC Einstein, Nik Makino, Yeng Constantino	Hip hop/rap	Halfway House	
1	We Gon' Get It	J emm Dahon, King Lheanard, Kushin, GH Town	Hip hop/rap	Viva Records	
1	Fine Sh!t	Lightskeen Baby	Hip hop/rap	Global Noir	
1	Blessed	Raf Davis	Hip hop/rap	The Real Deal	
1	Kakaiba	GAT	P-pop	Ivory Music and Video	
2	Oxygen	Bini, Orchestra of the Filipino Youth	Pop	Coke Studio Philippines	
2	Panga-Rap	Pio Balbuena	Hip hop/rap	Tambay	
8	Ipinangako	Erik Santos	Pop	Star Music	
8	ODDicted (EP)	Jeremy Glinoga	Pop	Star Music	
8	Being Ice (Album)	Ice Seguerra	Pop	Star Music	
8	Sino Nga Ba Siya?	Mika Salamanca	Pop	Star Music	
8	rOe (EP)	Ena Mori	Pop	Offshore Music; Sony Music Philippines	
8	Tanga	Noah Alejandre	Pop	Evolution Media	
8	Langit Ka, Lupa Ako	Good Luck Mito	Pop	The Cozy Cove	
8	Pa'no Bang Mag-isa?	Mark Carpio	Pop	Independent	
8	Tides	Yael Yuzon, Miaow	Pop rock	Independent	
8	Ako Na Lang	The Juans	Pop rock	Viva Records	
8	Black N' White	Dilaw	Alternative pop	Warner Music Philippines	
8	Panaginip	Plume	Alternative pop	AltG Records	
8	Wifi Love	Earl Generao	Indie pop	Yellow Room Music	
8	Bagani (Album)	Oh! Caraga	Visayan	Bahandi Records	
8	Bonethugs	Gloc-9, Abaddon	Hip hop/rap	Universal Records	
8	Sayang	Yoki, Kiyo	Hip hop/rap	Independent	
8	I Bet You Never	4th Impact	P-pop	Independent	
9	Bless Out Darkness	Bukas Palad Music Ministry	Contemporary; Christian	Jesuit Music Ministry	
9	Sakripisyo	Haring Manggi	Hip hop/rap	Mayamang Manggi Records	
13	Nanaman	IV of Spades	Pop rock	Sony Music Philippines	
13	Oh My Pumpkin!	MNL48	P-pop	Independent	
13	Because	Yno	Alternative pop	Sony Music Philippines	
15	Band Aid	Moira Dela Torre (feat. Johnoy Danao)	Pop	Republic Records Philippines (UMG Philippines)	
15	In Lab	Ogie Alcasid	Pop	Star Music	
15	Exam	Ben Mara	Pop	Star Music	
15	Reiven (EP)	Reiven Umali	Pop	Star Music	
15	Indak	Angelo Garcia	Pop	Vicor Music	
15	Hardin	Ila	Pop	PolyEast Records	
15	Halata	Paul Pablo	Pop	Boombox Music	
15	Love on Loop (Album)	Lola Amour	Alternative	Warner Music Philippines	
15	Duwag	Paham	Alternative	Off the Record; Sony Music Philippines	
15	Fujiko	Just Hush	Hip hop/rap	Viva Records	
15	World Wide Web	Lightskeen Baby	Hip hop/rap	Global Noir	
15	Serendipity	Kxle	Hip hop/rap	Off Human	
15	Coke Boys	Zjay, Tu$ Brothers	Hip hop/rap	Independent	
15	Set Me Apart	Darla Baltazar, Crowned Worship	Contemporary; Christian	Independent	
15	Sulong	Toto Sorioso	Contemporary; Christian	Jesuit Music Ministry	
15	Viñas DeLuxe (EP)	Viñas DeLuxe	Drag	Star Music	
17	Don't U Say	Alisson Shore	R&B/soul	Independent	
18	Simoy	Rob Deniel	Alternative	Viva Records	
18	Iisang Daan	Rob Deniel, Kyle Echarri	Alternative, Soul	Viva Records	
18	Nakupo	Kyle Echarri	Pop	Viva Records	
18	Kumusta Na	Rob Deniel	Alternative, Pop	Viva Records	
18	Lipstick Na Itim	Kyle Echarri	Pop	Viva Records	
18	Balisong	Amiel Sol, Shanne Dandan	Acoustic, Soul	Viva Records	
20	Kuryente	Ziv, Jolianne	Pop	Sony Music Philippines	
20	LezGo	Young Blood Neet	Hip hop/rap	GhostWorldwide	
20	Asian Eyyy!	P-NICE	Dance, Pop	World of Wonder	
21	Unang Halik	TJ Monterde	Pop	Independent	
21	U Were Never Mine	Justin Vasquez	Pop	Republic Records Philippines (UMG Philippines)	
21	Listahan ng Pangalan	Marlon Talavera	Pop	Offshore Music; Sony Music Philippines	
21	Headlines	BGYO	P-pop	Star Music	
21	Mundo ng Magigiting	Join the Club	Alternative rock	Independent	
22	Tahimik Na Buhay Kapiling Ka	Amiel Sol	Pop	Ivory Music and Video	
22	Libu-Libong Buwan (Uuwian)	Kyle Raphael	Pop	Viva Records	
22	Action	Jayda Avanzado	Pop	Republic Records Philippines (UMG Philippines)	
22	Pusuan	Marion Aunor	Pop	Wild Dream Records	
22	The Mire is Where Grace Abounds	Darla Baltazar	Pop	Wings Music Group	
22	Mahal Mo Kasi	Destiny Palisoc	Pop	KDR Music House	
22	Things We Used To Say	Cheats	Indie rock	Independent	
22	Dos (Album)	Never the Strangers	Alternative pop	Island Records Philippines (UMG Philippines)	
22	Payag Ka Ba?	Teys	Hip hop/rap	Unstable Entertainment	
22	Clique Freestyle	Jeff Grecia	Hip hop/rap	Independent	
22	Kulang	Joshua Mari	Hip hop/rap	Independent	
22	Never Ever	Jay R, Shannice	R&B/soul	Hitmakers Entertainment	
22	Lamig	Dom Guyot	R&B/soul	Sony Music Philippines	
23	Palaisipan	Loonie (feat. Arthur Nery)	Hip hop/rap	Independent	
23	Teka Muna	Guddhist Gunatita	Hip hop/rap	Independent	
23	Stop Ball	Gat Putch	Hip hop/rap	Greenhouse Records	
25	Nang-iwan	Joshua Mari	Hip hop/rap	Independent	
29	Ulap	Gigi de Lana	Pop	Tritone Studios	
29	Dito Ka Lang, 'Wag Kang Lalayo	Klarisse de Guzman	Pop	Star Music	
29	Crazy	Kai Montinola, Kolette, Rain Celmar	Pop	Star Music	
29	Minamahal	Ashtine Olviga, Andres Muhlach	Pop	Viva Records	
29	Miss Kita	Frank Ely	Pop	Evolution Media	
29	Ikaw Na Lang	Fern.	Pop	Island Records Philippines (UMG Philippines)	
29	Paano Ba 'To?	The Cohens	Pop rock	Tarsier Records	
29	Gayuma	Nobita, Yeng Constantino	Alternative pop	Sony Music Philippines	
29	Manila	It All Started in May	Alternative pop	Universal Records	
29	Rehab	Shanti Dope	Hip hop/rap	Universal Records	
29	Edad	Cookie$	Hip hop/rap	The Bakeshop Studios	
29	Lapuk	Nik Makino, Shao Lin	Hip hop/rap	Independent	
29	T4NGA	Elhe	R&B/soul	RealWrld	
29	Mahal Ko	Dro Perez	R&B/soul	Wavy Records	
29	To Be Close to Jesus	Young Voices of the Philippines	Contemporary; Christian	Jesuit Music Ministry	

==== September ====
Date	Single / album	Artist(s)	Genre(s)	Label(s)	Ref.
1	Tulad ng Dati	Ena Mori, Over October	Alternative rock	Coke Studio Philippines	
1	Rock Baby	Alamat, Mrld	R&B/soul	Coke Studio Philippines	
1	Let Love Be The Gift	Christian Bautista, Abi Marquez	Ballad	Independent	
1	Skyami	Realest Cram, CK YG	Hip hop/rap	GhostWorldwide	
4	Placevo	Gat Putch	Hip hop/rap	Greenhouse Records	
5	Hayup Ka	Janine Berdin	Pop	Island Records Philippines (UMG Philippines)	
5	Joseph K.	Elijah Canlas	Pop	Island Records Philippines (UMG Philippines)	
5	Wala? Nandiyan	Belle Mariano, Cesca, Trisha Denise	Pop	Star Music	
5	KIKXV: Volume 3	Kiko Salazar	Pop	Star Music	
5	Rarara (Album)	Dilaw	Alternative rock	Warner Music Philippines	
5	Gime Me A Kiss	Kean Cipriano	Alternative rock	O/C Records	
5	Fall Season	Dionela, Alex Bruce	R&B/soul	Coke Studio Philippines	
5	Blessed	James Reid	R&B/soul	Careless Music; Sony Music Philippines	
5	Donnabella Freestyle	Clien, Allmo$t	Hip hop/rap	Viva Records	
5	Smooch Kriminal	Robledo Timido	Hip hop/rap	RealWrld	
5	Moshpit	Apekz, A$tro	Hip hop/rap	Independent	
5	Babawiin	Joshua Mari	Hip hop/rap	Independent	
5	Android	Chocolate Factory	Reggae	Numinous Philippines	
5	Kind and Merciful	Himig Heswita, Bukas Palad Music Ministry	Contemporary; Christian	Jesuit Music Ministry	
8	Nightshift	La Mave	Hip hop/rap	Independent	
9	Kiss (Never Let Me Go)	JKris, Chloe Redondo	Hip hop/rap	BDB.PH Music	
10	Konsensya	IV of Spades	Alternative rock	Sony Music Philippines	
10	Sandali	Cup of Joe	Alternative rock	Viva Records	
10	Maangas	Paul N Ballin	Hip hop/rap	Rawstarr Records	
12	What If Tayo?	Mika Salamanca, Brent Manalo	Pop	Star Music	
12	Sarhan	Gigi de Lana	Pop	KDR Music House	
12	Ako Lang	Dia Maté	Pop	Radical Company	
12	Love I'm Feelin'	Will Mikhael	Pop	Universal Records	
12	Digital	Brei	Pop	Universal Records	
12	Hirang	Daryl Ong	Pop	Independent	
12	Tawid (Album)	The Juans	Pop rock	Viva Records	
12	Liwanag	Magiliw Street	Alternative rock	Nine Degrees North	
12	Weaponized	Pedicab	Alternative rock	Independent	
12	Kakampi	Gloc-9, Abaddon, Hero	Hip hop/rap	Universal Records	
12	Sabi Ko Sa'yo	Playertwo (feat. Lustbass)	Hip hop/rap	Warner Music Philippines	
12	Gabayan Mo Kami	Luci J	Hip hop/rap	Lucidreams Music	
12	Bawal Bastos	Lua$, Adze, Emjey, Noizy Boy	Hip hop/rap	Melodiya Records	
12	Bounce	Mike Kosa, Dank Puffs, J Skeelz	Hip hop/rap	Independent	
12	What A Day	Gloryfall (feat. Hailey Huyssen)	Contemporary; Christian	Waterwalk Records	
14	Lason	Alisson Shore, Because	Hip hop/rap	Independent	
17	Ikaw Sana	Rob Deniel	Pop	Vicor Music	
17	Buzzkill (Forever) (Album)	Lyn Lapid	Pop	Mercury Records (UMG Philippines)	
17	Humahalik	Allmo$t	Hip hop/rap	Viva Records	
17	Grace (Gigil Sa'yo)	Gat Putch	Hip hop/rap	Greenhouse Records	
17	Kuntento	Matthaios	R&B/soul	Independent	
17	Saan Kailan	Jarlo Base	R&B/soul	Sony Music Philippines	
18	Got To Be Ü	Hazel Faith	Pop	Sony Music Philippines	
19	Kolorcoaster (EP)	Maki	Pop	Tarsier Records	
19	Unimaginable (Album)	Klarisse de Guzman	Pop	Star Music	
19	The Artist (Album)	Marlo Mortel	Pop	Star Music	
19	Khimo (Album)	Khimo	Pop	Star Music	
19	Intergalactic Adikinsane (Album)	Rocksteddy	Rock	Sony Music Philippines	
19	Wasabi (Halmanataki)	Gracenote	Rock	EMI Records (UMG Philippines)	
19	Tulala	Hilera	Rock	Yellow Room Music	
19	Pink Skies	The Bloomfields	Pop rock	Lilystars Records	
19	Relapse	One Click Straight	Alternative rock	Island Records Philippines (UMG Philippines)	
19	Kahit 1 Month Pa Lang	Hattus, Eunice Rain	Indie folk	Off the Record; Sony Music Philippines	
19	Musika	Jeff Grecia	Hip hop/rap	Independent	
19	Hotline G	MaxyPresko, Kxle	Hip hop/rap	Independent	
19	Mahiwaga	A$tro	Hip hop/rap	Urban Department	
19	High Time	Reyn4	Drag	World of Wonder Productions	
20	Republika ng Tambay (EP)	Pio Balbuena	Hip hop/rap	Independent	
22	Bleed	Mica Javier	R&B/soul	Independent	
25	Headlines (EP)	BGYO	P-pop	Star Music	
26	Lab Songs ng Mga Tanga (Album)	Janine Berdin	Pop	Island Records Philippines (UMG Philippines)	
26	Kung Di Mo Alam	Justin Vasquez	Pop	Republic Records Philippines (UMG Philippines)	
26	K*pal	Bryan Chong	Pop	Star Music	
26	Out of the Darkness	Sam Benwick	Pop	Independent	
26	Dahan	Over October	Alternative rock	Underdog Music PH	
26	Gabi-gabi	Magnus Haven	Alternative rock	Vicor Music	
26	Pinapaasa	Soapdish	Alternative rock	Yellow Room Music	
26	Industriya	Shanti Dope	Hip hop/rap	Universal Records	
26	Don't Wanna Think About You	Allmo$t, Clien	Hip hop/rap	Viva Records	
26	4 AM	CK YG	Hip hop/rap	GhostWorldwide	
26	Adik Na Sa'yo	Nik Makino	Hip hop/rap	Independent	
26	Space Cake	Sajka	Hip hop/rap	Independent	
26	Sana Tumawag	Sica	Hip hop/rap	Independent	
26	Wait	Jay R	R&B/soul	Hitmakers Entertainment	
26	Magayon	Juan Caoile	R&B/soul	Viva Records	
26	Ako Na	AJAA	P-pop	Star Music	
26	Muni-muni	6ense	P-pop	Sony Music Philippines	
28	Pakinggan Mo	Klied Cuangco	Ballad	Star Music	
28	Ang Bituin	Sean Bernardez	Ballad	Star Music	
28	Sisikat Bukas	MJ Alcano	Ballad	Star Music	
28	Dalangin	Quinn Holmes	Ballad	Star Music	
28	Pangarap Ko	Yassi Estrera	Ballad	Star Music	
28	Maaabot Ko	Alexa Mendoza	Ballad	Star Music	

=== Fourth quarter ===
==== October ====
Date	Single / album	Artist(s)	Genre(s)	Label(s)	Ref.
1	Pangako Ng Bukas	Miguel Escueta, Champ Lui Pio	Pop	Independent	
1	Kapa	Raven	Pop	Sony Music Philippines	
1	Puso at Isip	Nateman, Yung Bawal, Baby Blood	Hip hop/rap	Sony Music Philippines	
2	First Luv	Bini	P-pop	Star Music	
2	Blessed AF (Album)	Bugoy na Koykoy	Hip hop/rap	Independent	
3	Please	Sugarcane	Pop	Warner Music Philippines	
3	Sulyap	Arthur Miguel	Pop	Warner Music Philippines	
3	Ikaw	JC Herrero	Pop	Warner Music Philippines	
3	Kapag Umuulan	Leyo	Pop	Sony Music Philippines	
3	Kumikilos	Dwta (feat. Higit sa Pag-ibig, The Musical)	Pop	Sony Music Philippines	
3	Slow	Ica Frias	Pop	Off the Record; Sony Music Philippines	
3	Ang Sakit Sakit	Jessa Zaragoza	Pop	Nine Degrees North	
3	Teka	Paolo Santos	Pop	Evolution Media	
3	Next Episode (Album)	Kyla	R&B/soul	Star Music	
3	Pano Kaya	Nik Makino	Hip hop/rap	Independent	
3	Dank and Dope	Yuridope, Dank Puffs	Hip hop/rap	Independent	
3	Unti-unti	A$tro, Jeff Grecia	Hip hop/rap	Independent	
6	GN2U	Kristina Dawn	R&B/soul	Downtown Q' Entertainment	
7	Sa Una Lang Masaya	Joshua Mari	Hip hop/rap	Independent	
8	Hadlang	Jason Marvin	Pop	Sony Music Philippines	
8	Suliranin	IV of Spades	Alternative rock	Sony Music Philippines	
9	Don't Ask Me Why	DNA	P-pop	Star Music	
10	Tanaw	Jan Roberts	Pop	Warner Music Philippines	
10	Tayo Na Lang Kaya	Carmela Lorzano	Pop	MQuest Music	
10	Departure (Album)	Bryan Chong	Pop	Star Music	
10	Nosi Ba Lasi?	EJ de Perio	Indie pop	Sony Music Philippines	
10	Amihan	I Belong to the Zoo	Alternative rock	Independent	
10	Biyaya	Dear Juliet	Alternative rock	Independent	
10	Palayo sa Mundo	Arthur Nery, Jolianne	R&B/soul	Careless Music; Sony Music Philippines	
10	Nobody	Kris Lawrence	R&B/soul	Homeworkz Entertainment Services	
10	Hindi Na Babalik	Myrus	R&B/soul	Independent	
10	Magarang Kotse	Gloc-9, Abaddon	Hip hop/rap	Universal Records	
12	Freeky	Sica	Hip hop/rap	AB Music	
12	Patangay	Luci J, Guddhist Gunatita	Hip hop/rap	Lucidreams Music	
14	Init ng Katawan	Aris Conception	Ballad	BenTria Productions	
15	Delikado	The Dawn, Sean Archer	Rock	Sony Music Philippines	
15	Tatlong Hiling	Vvink	P-pop	FlipMusic Records	
16	Gangsta	Costa Cashman, Fern.	Hip hop/rap	Independent	
17	Tulala	Nicole	Pop	Ivory Music and Video	
17	May Forever Ba	Marimar	Pop	MQuest Music	
17	Lutang	Jed Baruelo	Pop	Sony Music Philippines	
17	Wasak Na Puso	Six Part Invention	Pop	Star Music	
17	Teleserye	Destiny Palisoc	Pop	KDR Music House	
17	Aking Tatanggapin	Lani Misalucha	Independent		
17	Pusong Malamig	Dreycruz, Bert Symoun	Hip hop/rap	Unstable Entertainment	
17	Freedom	La Mave	Hip hop/rap	NPS Music	
17	The Album is Done (Album)	Nik Makino	Hip hop/rap	Independent	
17	Siga	Apekz	Hip hop/rap	Independent	
17	Don Romantiko	Yes My Love	P-pop	Star Music	
18	Freeky	Sica	Hip hop/rap	Independent	
18	Pagkatao	Guddhist Gunatita	Hip hop/rap	Independent	
20	Downfall of us all (EP)	The Feeble One	Punk rock/alternative		
21	Que	Kristina Dawn	R&B/soul	Downtown Q' Entertainment	
23	Sa Huling Pag-uwi Mo	Aegis	Rock	Alpha Music	
24	Umpisa	Moira Dela Torre, (feat. Adie)	Pop	Republic Records Philippines (UMG Philippines)	
24	Yours	Justin Vasquez	Pop	Republic Records Philippines (UMG Philippines)	
24	Kailan Ka Uuwi?	Juan Karlos (feat. Flow G)	Pop	Island Records Philippines (UMG Philippines)	
24	Dalawa	Jason Dhakal	Pop	Warner Music Philippines	
24	Langit Lupa	Dwta	Pop	Sony Music Philippines	
24	Ganda-gandahan (Remix)	Dia Maté (feat. Sassa Gurl)	Pop	Radical Company	
24	Balikan	The Bloomfields	Pop	Lilystars Records	
24	Buhay-buhayin	Similar Sky	Pop rock	Nine Degrees North	
24	Buhos ng Ulan	Silent Sanctuary	Alternative rock	Universal Records	
24	Manariwa	I Belong to the Zoo	Alternative rock	Independent	
24	Martir	Zelle	Alternative rock	Independent	
24	P Day	CK YG	Hip hop/rap	Ghost Worldwide	
24	Sin City Boy Mixtape (EP)	Lightskeen Baby	Hip hop/rap	Global Noir	
24	'Wag Maingay	Kiddotin	Hip hop/rap	RealWrld	
24	Get Dat	Al James	Hip hop/rap	Independent	
24	Part Time	Zae	Hip hop/rap	Independent	
24	Chemistry	Cliff	R&B/soul	Warner Music Philippines	
24	Sa'yo	Jay R	R&B/soul	Hitmakers Entertainment	
24	Libog	Dom Guyot, Jikamarie	R&B/soul	Sony Music Philippines	
25	Jazzy Ties	1096 Gang	Hip hop/rap	Independent	
29	RD Covers Live (EP)	Rob Deniel	Pop	Vicor Music	
29	Patient	Sofronio Vasquez	Pop, R&B	Star Music	
29	Ekis	Sean Archer	Pop rock	Sony Music Philippines	
30	You're My Christmas Song	Aby, Chad Borja	Christmas	Sony Music Philippines	
31	Nahihiya	Kenaniah	Pop	O/C Records	
31	Akin Lang	Kevin Montillano	Pop	KDR Music House	
31	8000	Shanti Dope	Hip hop/rap	Universal Records	
31	Kahit Umulan	La Mave, Waiian	Hip hop/rap	NPS Music	
31	Rich Uncle Activities (Album)	Bugoy na Koykoy	Hip hop/rap	2 Joints Enterprise	
31	OG Kaybee	Abaddon	Hip hop/rap	Rhyme and Rhythm	
31	GV GV Lang	A$tro	Hip hop/rap	Urban Department	
31	Ayos Lang	Demi	R&B/soul	Sony Music Philippines	
31	Kabataang Pinoy	BGYO, Cloud 7	P-pop	Star Music	

==== November ====
Date	Single / album	Artist(s)	Genre(s)	Label(s)	Ref.
2	Ako'y Ikaw	Mike Kosa, Mason Karet	Hip hop/rap	Independent	
4	Make A Wish	Kristina Dawn	R&B/soul	Downtown Q' Entertainment	
5	Andalucia (Album)	IV of Spades	Rock	Sony Music Philippines	
5	You Deserve It	James Reid	R&B/soul	Careless; Sony Music Philippines	
6	Paruparo (Album)	Bini	P-pop	Star Music	
7	Haliparot, Delulu	AADA	Pop	Star Pop	
7	La Loba	Ena Mori	Pop	Offshore Music	
7	Hinga Muna	Fred Engay	Pop	Orieland	
7	Let Our Love	Nicole Laurel Asensio	Pop	Warner Music Philippines	
7	Hating Kapatid OST	Various artists	Pop	GMA Playlist	
7	Told Ya So	Sam Benwick	Pop	Independent	
7	Clue	Rangel	Pop	Independent	
7	Diwa	Solace Out the Door	Alternative pop	Nine Degrees North	
7	Gusto Ko Lang Maalala (EP)	The Vowels They Orbit	Alternative	Sony Music Philippines	
7	Sa'yo Lang	Shirebound	Alternative rock	Independent	
7	Ikaw Lagi	Alyson	Indie rock	Offshore Music	
7	All Day	Gloc-9	Hip hop/rap	Universal Records	
7	Sa Dagat	Escala	Hip hop/rap	Off the Record; Sony Music Philippines	
7	I Don't Know	Zeke Abella	Hip hop/rap	Independent	
7	Ako Naman Muna	Syd Hartha	R&B/soul	Sony Music Philippines	
7	Luzviminda	Alamat	P-pop	Viva Records	
7	Aking Musika (Album)	Wilbert Ross	P-pop	Viva Records	
7	Our Savior Was Born	Gloryfall	Contemporary; Christian	Waterwalk Records	
7	Paskong-Pasko Na	Timmy Cruz	Christmas	Star Music	
8	Malakas	Young Blood Neet, Kiyo	Hip hop/rap	GhostWorldwide	
11	Walang Makakapigil (Album)	Gracenote	Pop rock	EMI Records (UMG Philippines)	
11	Lonely Room	Mica Javier, Lil Eddie	R&B/soul	Jamaica LLC	
12	EA Na Taga	Unxpctd	Hip hop/rap	Sony Music Philippines	
12	Naalala	It All Started in May	Alternative pop	Universal Records	
12	Ikaw Ang Pag-asa	Adelene Rabulan	Inspirational	KDR Music House	
13	For You	Zack Tabudlo	Pop, R&B	Republic Records Philippines (UMG Philippines)	
13	Puno ng Puso ang Paskong Pinoy	Various artists	Christmas	GMA Music	
14	Simula	Julie Anne San Jose	Pop	Independent	
14	Gusto Ko Lang Sumaya	Yeng Constantino	Pop	Independent	
14	'Wag Ka Nang Umuwi	Noah Alejandre	Pop	Evolution Media	
14	Ikaw Lang Ang Hiling	Brei	Pop	Universal Records	
14	Manila Sound: Jarea (Album)	Jarea	Pop	Star Music	
14	24th	Chrstn	Pop	O/C Records	
14	Ang Ilaw Mo	Healy After Dark	Alternative rock	O/C Records	
14	Sa Uulitin	David La Sol	Indie pop	Nine Degrees North	
14	For The Chosen (EP)	Lo Ki	Hip hop/rap	Viva Records	
14	Happy Accidents (Vol. 2) (EP)	Playertwo	Hip hop/rap	Warner Music Philippines	
14	Sasama Ka Ba?	Baby Blood, Kiddotin	Hip hop/rap	Believe Music	
14	또 (Also)	Kristina Dawn	R&B/soul	Downtown Q' Entertainment	
14	Perfect Christmas	Ronnie Liang	Christmas	RL Music	
14	Paborito Kong Pasko	JM dela Cerna, Marielle Montillano	Christmas	Star Music	
14	Ngayong Pasko'y Ikaw Pa Rin	Jojo Mendrez	Christmas	Star Music	
14	Love, Joy, Hope: Sabay Tayo Ngayong Pasko	Various artists	Christmas	Star Music	
14	Baduy	Vvink, DJ Love (feat. Pio Balbuena)	P-pop	FlipMusic Records	
16	Santo Carlo Acutis (Ulirang Kaibigan ng Kabataan)	Darwin Lomentigar, City of Voices	Contemporary; Christian	Jesuit Music Ministry	
16	Preety Girls Stunna	Sica	Hip hop/rap	Independent	
17	Bebe	Skusta Clee	Hip hop/rap	Saucy Island	
17	Until I Reach the Sun (Album)	The Ridleys	Alternative folk	Underdog Music PH	
19	What's Yo Name?	Fern.	Pop	Island Records Philippines (UMG Philippines)	
19	Sungit	Any Name's Okay	Alternative pop	Sony Music Philippines	
20	Flames (Album)	Bini	P-pop	Star Music	
20	Kanta Sa Kanya	La Mave	R&B/soul	Heatwave Records	
21	Suob	Juan Karlos	Pop	Island Records Philippines (UMG Philippines)	
21	Bahala Na Sila	Trisha Macapagal	Pop	Nine Degrees North	
21	Pagitan	Rangel	Pop	Independent	
21	David Young (EP)	David Young	Pop	Star Music	
21	FANA (Album)	Fana	R&B	Star Music	
21	Sa Isang Kisap	Klarisse de Guzman	Ballad	Star Music	
21	Memory (EP)	Sugarcane	Alternative	Warner Music Philippines	
21	OSA	Lily	Pop rock	UMG Philippines	
21	Sa Isipan Lagi	Robledo Timido	Hip hop/rap	RealWrld	
21	Buayawa	Cookie$	Hip hop/rap	The Bakeshop Studios	
21	Konting Tiis	JMara	Hip hop/rap	Morobeats	
21	Stamina	Godd Patron, Yuridope	Hip hop/rap	Independent	
21	Heartbroken Christmas	Jay R, Mica Javier	Christmas	Hitmakers Entertainment	
21	This Christmas (Ho Ho Ho)	Dia Maté, Rufa Mae Quinto	Christmas	Radical Company	
21	Destino (Album)	Alamat	P-pop	Viva Records	
21	Pahinga	Hori7on	P-pop	Independent	
21	Panginoon, Sa Iyong Pagdating	Himig Heswita, Hangad	Contemporary; Christian	Jesuit Music Ministry	
22	Tanging Hiling	Sponge Cola	Rock	Sony Music Philippines	
22	The Dissection of Eve (Album)	G22	P-pop	Cornerstone Music	
23	Bira	Haring Manggi	Hip hop/rap	Mayamang Manggi Records	
24	Boo Thang	Paul N' Ballin, Ryannah J	Hip hop/rap	Rawstarr Records	
26	Dito Ka Lang	Nobita	Alternative rock	Sony Music Philippines	
27	Hanggang Kailan	A$tro	Hip hop/rap	Independent	
28	Rupok	Janine Berdin, Dom Guyot	Pop	Sony Music Philippines	
28	Hindi Mo Alam	Ace Banzuelo	Pop	Sony Music Philippines	
28	Heartscapes (Album)	Ica Frias	Pop	Sony Music Philippines	
28	Tibok (Heto Na Ba 'Yon?)	Carren Eistrup	Pop	PolyEast Records	
28	Never Goes Away	Leanne & Naara	Pop	Warner Music Philippines	
28	Sana Ako Na Lang	Rhodessa	Pop	Viva Records	
28	Babala	Jayda Avanzado	Pop	Republic Records Philippines (UMG Philippines)	
28	Aguinaldo	Lyka Estrella	Pop	Star Music	
28	Favorite Season	Bugoy Drilon	Pop	314 Studios	
28	Kaba	Alex Gonzaga	Pop	O/C Records	
28	Clingy	Will Mikhael	Pop	Universal Records	
28	Every Christmas	Catriona Gray	Christmas	Cornerstone Music	
28	Piliin	Adie	R&B/soul	O/C Records	
28	Ahora	Kristina Dawn	R&B/soul	FRKN Records	
28	Pagsibol (EP)	Amiel Sol	Pop, R&B	Ivory Music and Video	
28	Heart of Ifugao	Orange and Lemons (feat. Valerie Pawid West)	Alternative	Lilystars Records	
28	Balik Tanaw (EP)	I Belong to the Zoo	Alternative	Independent	
28	She Feels	Oh, Flamingo!	Indie rock	Offshore Music	
28	Kwintas	Shanti Dope	Hip hop/rap	Universal Records	
28	Gusto Rin	Apekz	Hip hop/rap	Independent	

==== December ====
Date	Single / album	Artist(s)	Genre(s)	Label(s)	Ref.
1	Walang Patid ang Paskong Kapatid	Various artists	Christmas	MQuest Music	
1	Kalawakan	Rob Deniel	Pop	Vicor Music	
2	Thonglor Hideout	Bugoy na Koykoy	Hip hop/rap	2 Joints Enterprise	
3	Nasa	Kai Buizon	Pop	Sony Music Philippines	
5	Lerma	Kiddotin, La Mave	Hip hop/rap	RealWrld	
5	Mabisang Pinay	Dreycruz	Hip hop/rap	Unstable Entertainment	
5	Hand in Hand	Finix	P-pop	GKD Records	
7	Hanggang sa Magunaw ang Mundo	Mayonnaise	Alternative rock	Independent	
8	Laruan	Join the Club	Alternative rock	Universal Records	
8	Kung 'Di Man Tayo	Destiny Palisoc	Pop	KDR Music House	
10	PYP	Yuridope	Hip hop/rap	The Dope Music	
12	Biglaan	Eliza Maturan	Pop	Unstable Entertainment	
12	Tinatangi	Kevin Montillano	Pop	KDR Music House	
12	Pasko'y Walang Katulad	Dylan Menor	Christmas	Universal Records	
12	Paskong Lonely	Allmo$t	Christmas, Hip hop/rap	Viva Records	
12	Hanggang Kailan	Michael Pacquiao	Hip hop/rap	Oblivion Paradise	
12	Escala	Escala	Hip hop/rap	Off the Record; Sony Music Philippines	
12	Di Maiiwasan	Guddhist Gunatita	Hip hop/rap	Independent	
16	Superman	Sofronio Vasquez	Pop	Warner Music Philippines	
17	Bon Appétit, General	Nica del Rosario, Matthew Chang	Pop	FlipMusic Records	
17	Rosas (Album)	Yuridope	Hip hop/rap	Panty Droppaz League	
17	Simbolo ng Pasko	Press Hit Play	P-pop	Sony Music Philippines	
18	Masasanay Din	Jrldm	R&B/soul	Independent	
19	Tahanan	SB19	Pop	Sony Music Philippines	
19	Pakisabi Na Lang	Sam Concepcion	Pop	Universal Records	
19	Walang Ibang Paglalagyan	Andrej Agas	Pop	Agas Music	
19	2G	Al James, Because	Hip hop, rap	Independent	
19	Obviously Insecure Now I'm Losing Sleep (Album)	Sud	Alternative	Yellow Room Music	
19	Tribu Hymn	Oh! Caraga	Regional	Bahandi Records	

== Notable shows ==
=== Local artists ===
Date(s)	Headliner(s)	Venue	City	Event / Tour	Note(s)	Ref(s)
January 11	Maki	Waterfront Hotel & Casino	Cebu	Maki-Concert sa Cebu	—N/a	
January 16	KZ Tandingan, TJ Monterde, Juan Karlos	Abellana Sports Complex	Cebu	Sinulog is Back!	—N/a	
January 17	Philippine Philharmonic Orchestra	Circuit Makati – Samsung Performing Arts Theater	Makati	PPO Concert IV — Europa	Conducted by Grzegorz Nowak	
January 17	Boboy Garovillo, Jim Paredes	Waterfront Hotel & Casino	Cebu	Coming Home: APO Hiking Society at 50 Years Live in Cebu	—N/a	
January 17	Janine Berdin, Shoti, Zack Tabudlo, Wonggoys	Plaza Independencia	Cebu	Coke Studio Live at the Sinulog Festival	—N/a	
January 17 and 24	Odette Quesada	Maybank Performing Arts Theater	Taguig	Odette Quesada Hits 60	—N/a	
January 18	Odette Quesada	Waterfront Hotel & Casino	Cebu	Odette Quesada 40th Anniversary Concert	—N/a	
January 18	Sofronio Vasquez	Waterfront Hotel & Casino	Cebu	Sofronio Vasquez Live	—N/a	
January 24	Maki	University of Baguio	Baguio	Maki-Concert sa Baguio	—N/a	
January 24	Gerald Santos	SM City North EDSA – Skydome	Quezon	Courage	—N/a	
January 25	Odette Quesada	SM City Davao – SMX Convention Center	Davao	Odette Quesada 40th Anniversary Concert	—N/a	
January 25	Manila Symphony Orchestra	Circuit Makati – Samsung Performing Arts Theater	Makati	MSO 99th Anniversary Concert: A Tribute to Burt Bacharach	With special guests, Ryan Cayabyab, Ryan Cayabyab Singers, Lara Maigue, Gian Magdangal, and Alice Reyes Dance Philippines	
January 25	Lei Bautista, Cooky Chua, Wency Cornejo, Naldy Padilla	Music Museum	San Juan	Frontmen and Rock Chix	—N/a	
January 25	Dance Supremacy	The Theatre at Solaire	Parañaque	Dance Supremacy	—N/a	
January 31	Dingdong Avanzado, Martin Nievera, Ice Seguerra, Jessa Zaragosa	Newport Performing Arts Theater	Pasay	The Music of Vehnee Saturno	—N/a	
February 1–2	Aegis	New Frontier Theater	Quezon	Halik Sa Ulan: Valentine Concert	—N/a	
February 1–3	TJ Monterde	Araneta Coliseum	Quezon	Sarili Nating Mundo at the Big Dome	—N/a	
February 6	Manila Symphony Orchestra, Raul Sunico	Metropolitan Theater	Manila	Gabi ng Piyano Konsyertong Pilipino	—N/a	
February 7	Pops Fernandez, Martin Nievera	SM Mall of Asia Arena	Pasay	Always and Forever	—N/a	
February 7	Nina	New Frontier Theater	Quezon	Love Matters	—N/a	
February 8	Cup of Joe	Araneta Coliseum	Quezon	Silakbo	—N/a	
February 8	Kean Cipriano, Juris Fernandez, Duncan Ramos, Ice Seguerra, Sitti, Princess Velasco, Nyoy Volante	The Theatre at Solaire	Parañaque	Love, Sessionistas	—N/a	
February 9	Barbie Almalbis, Lougee Basabas, Acel Bisa, Aia de Leon, Kitchie Nadal, Hannah Romawac	Newport Performing Arts Theater	Pasay	Tanaw	—N/a	
February 13	Ogie Alcasid, Ryan Cayabyab, Louie Ocampo	Solaire Resort North	Quezon	OAC: Original and Absolute Classics	—N/a	
February 14	Philippine Philharmonic Orchestra	Metropolitan Theater	Manila	PPO Concert V — Hope	Conducted by Grzegorz Nowak	
February 14	APO Hiking Society	The Theatre at Solaire	Parañaque	The Apo Hiking Society: Betting On Love	—N/a	
February 14	Gab Pangilinan	Maybank Performing Arts Theater	Taguig	Gab Pangilinan in Concert: This is Not a Musical	—N/a	
February 14–15	Christian Bautista, Yeng Constantino, Erik Santos	Newport Performing Arts Theater	Pasay	Stories of the Heart	—N/a	
February 14–15, 21–22	Regine Velasquez	Circuit Makati – Samsung Performing Arts Theater	Makati	Reset	Stell was initially planned to be a guest performer, but he canceled his appearance due to a schedule conflict.	
February 15	Bini	Philippine Arena	Bocaue	The Grand Biniverse 2025: The Valentine's Repeat	First local act to hold a solo concert at Philippine Arena.	
February 20 – March 9	Repertory Philippines	Eastwood Theater	Quezon	I Love You, You're Perfect, Now Change	—N/a	
February 22	Maki	Corpus Christi School Gymnasium	Cagayan de Oro	Maki-Concert sa CDO	—N/a	
February 22	The Dawn	Music Museum	San Juan	The Dawn: Almost 40	—N/a	
February 28	Cloud 7	Music Museum	San Juan	Nasa Cloud 7 Ako	—N/a	
February 28 – March 2	Lyric Opera of the Philippines	St. Scholastica's College	Manila	Tosca	Directed by Laurice Guillen	
February 28 – March 2	Ballet Philippines	The Theatre at Solaire	Parañaque	Ang Panaginip	—N/a	
March 1	The Itchyworms	Newport Performing Arts Theater	Pasay	The Itchyworms: Good Time Show	—N/a	
March 1	TJ Monterde	SM City Davao – SMX Convention Center	Davao	Sarili Nating Mundo	—N/a	
March 6–7	Cup of Joe	Baguio Cultural and Convention Center	Baguio	Silakbo	—N/a	
March 7–9	Ballet Manila	Aliw Theater	Pasay	The Pearl Gala: Ballet Manila's 30th Anniversary	—N/a	
March 7–30	Tanghalang Pilipino	Tanghalang Ignacio B. Gimenez, CCP Complex	Pasay	Kisapmata	—N/a	
March 14	Philippine Philharmonic Orchestra	Circuit Makati – Samsung Performing Arts Theater	Makati	PPO Concert VI — Homecoming	Conducted by Grzegorz Nowak	
March 14–15	Johnoy Danao	Metropolitan Theater	Manila	Liwayway at Dapithapon	—N/a	
March 15	ArtStart	Music Museum	San Juan	ArtStart: The Reunion	—N/a	
March 16	Pops Fernandez, Martin Nievera	SM City Davao – SMX Convention Center	Davao	Always and Forever	—N/a	
March 22–23	FILharmoniKA	The Theatre at Solaire	Parañaque	Marvel Studios: Infinity Saga Concert Experience	Conducted by Gerard Salonga	
March 22	Cup of Joe	SM City Davao – SMX Convention Center	Davao	Silakbo	—N/a	
March 28	6cyclemind, Imago, Sandwich, Moonstar88, Gracenote, Banda ni Kleggy, and Ultracombo	Mandala Park – 123 Block	Mandaluyong	Soupstar Night: 25 Years of Soupstar Music	—N/a	
March 29	Cup of Joe	IC3 Convention Center	Cebu	Silakbo	—N/a	
March 29	Neocolours	Music Museum	San Juan	Tuloy Pa Rin Ang... 80's	Featuring Gino Padilla	
March 29	Munimuni	Alpas	Bacnotan	Alegorya Philippine Tour	—N/a	
April 2	Munimuni	TBA	Baguio	Alegorya Philippine Tour	—N/a	
April 4–5	Geneva Cruz	Music Museum	San Juan	Gen Evolution	—N/a	
April 4–5	Alice Reyes Dance Philippines	Maybank Performing Arts Theater	Taguig	Pagdiriwang: Sayaw at Alay sa Sining	—N/a	
April 5	Pinoy Big Brother: Gen 11 contestants	SM City North EDSA – Skydome	Quezon	The Unforgettabolabolabol General Assembly	—N/a	
April 6	Munimuni	Whitebox Collective	Lucena	Alegorya Philippine Tour	—N/a	
April 6	Typecast, Urbandub	New Frontier Theater	Quezon	Typecast X Urbandub 25th Anniversary Tour	—N/a	
April 6	Philippine Ballet Theatre	Circuit Makati – Samsung Performing Arts Theater	Makati	The Merry Widow	—N/a	
April 11	Philippine Philharmonic Orchestra	Circuit Makati – Samsung Performing Arts Theater	Makati	PPO Concert VII — Finale	Conducted by Grzegorz Nowak	
April 12	Munimuni	From Here	Cebu	Alegorya Philippine Tour	—N/a	
April 12	Typecast, Urbandub	Baguio Convention Center	Baguio	Typecast X Urbandub 25th Anniversary Tour	—N/a	
April 23–27	Various artists	Circuit Makati – Samsung Performing Arts Theater	Makati	International Dance Day Festival	—N/a	
April 24	Philippine Philharmonic Orchestra	Metropolitan Theater	Manila	PPO Send Off The UK Tour	Conducted by Grzegorz Nowak	
April 25	Munimuni	TBA	Cagayan de Oro	Alegorya Philippine Tour	—N/a	
April 25–June 28	Various artists	Newport Performing Arts Theater	Pasay	Delia D.: A Musical Featuring the Songs of Jonathan Manalo	—N/a	
April 26	MNL48	SM City North EDSA – Atrium	Quezon	MNL48 Reboot and Rise	—N/a	
April 26	Munimuni	TBA	Davao	Alegorya Philippine Tour	—N/a	
April 26–27	Tanghalang Pilipino	Tanghalang Ignacio B. Gimenez, CCP Complex	Pasay	Sigalot sa Venetia	—N/a	
April 27	Mrld	SM City North EDSA – Skydome	Quezon	Mrld, The 7th Sense	With special guest, G22	
May 1	December Avenue	Iloilo Sports Complex	Iloilo	December Avenue Live In Iloilo	—N/a	
May 1–2	Ang Mutya ng Section E cast	New Frontier Theater	Quezon	Section E Nation	—N/a	
May 9	Thea Astley, Chloe Redondo, Jessica Villarubin	Music Museum	San Juan	Born for This	—N/a	
May 17	Munimuni	Mandala Park – 123 Block	Mandaluyong	Alegorya Philippine Tour	—N/a	
May 17	Zsa Zsa Padilla	Circuit Makati – Samsung Performing Arts Theater	Makati	Zsa Zsa Padilla: Through the Years	Directed by Rowell Santiago	
May 22	D'Grind	Music Museum	San Juan	Indak ng Tagumpay	—N/a	
May 24	Ben&Ben	TBA	Cebu	The Traveller Across Dimensions World Tour	—N/a	
May 24	Moonstar88	Eton Centris	Quezon	25 Years of Torete	With special guest, Metro Manila Concert Orchestra	
May 24	Manila Symphony Orchestra	Aliw Theater	Pasay	Music for Peace	—N/a	
May 25	Steps Dance Studio	Circuit Makati – Samsung Performing Arts Theater	Makati	In Performance	—N/a	
May 30 – June 1	Ballet Manila	Aliw Theater	Pasay	Swan Lake	—N/a	
May 31 – June 1	SB19	Philippine Arena	Bocaue	Simula at Wakas World Tour	—N/a	
May 31	TJ Monterde	SM City Bacolod – SMX Convention Center	Bacolod	Sarili Nating Mundo	With special guest, KZ Tandingan	
June 7–8	FILharmoniKA	The Theatre at Solaire	Parañaque	Harry Potter and the Prisoner of Azkaban	Conducted by Gerard Salonga	
June 8	Ben&Ben	TBA	Bacolod	The Traveller Across Dimensions World Tour	—N/a	
June 11	G-Force	SM Mall of Asia Arena	Pasay	G-Force Project 2025	—N/a	
June 14	The Company	The Theatre at Solaire	Parañaque	The Company 40	—N/a	
June 21	Kitchie Nadal	Araneta Coliseum	Quezon	New Ground	—N/a	
June 22	Ben&Ben	TBA	Davao	The Traveller Across Dimensions World Tour	—N/a	
June 27	Jason Dy	Newport Performing Arts Theater	Pasay	Solidyfied: A Decade of Jason Dy	—N/a	
July 4	Neocolours	Music Museum	San Juan	Tuloy Pa Rin Ang... 80's – Episode 2	With special guest, APO Hiking Society	
July 5	Jed Madela	Music Museum	San Juan	Superhero	—N/a	
July 5	Bini, Flow G, G22, Kaia, SB19, Skusta Clee, SunKissed Lola	Philippine Arena	Bocaue	Puregold OPM Con	—N/a	
July 5–6	Philippine Ballet Theatre	Circuit Makati – Samsung Performing Arts Theater	Makati	Maria Makiling	—N/a	
July 11–12	Dulce	Maybank Performing Arts Theater	Taguig	Dulce, Wagi! All Hits Series	—N/a	
July 12	Various	GSIS Building – GSIS Theater	Pasay	Duyog: 1st International Youth Orchestra Festival	—N/a	
July 20	G-Force	The Theatre at Solaire	Parañaque	G Force Project 2025	—N/a	
July 22	RJ Jacinto	RCBC Plaza, Carlos P. Romulo Theater	Makati	RJ 80th: Thank You Birthday Concert	With special guest, Martin Nievera, Zsa Zsa Padilla, Sitti, Arnel Pineda, Jose Mari Chan	
July 24–25	TJ Monterde	Waterfront Hotel & Casino	Cebu	Sarili Nating Mundo	With special guest, KZ Tandingan	
July 25	Marco Sison	The Theatre at Solaire	Parañaque	Seasons of OPM	—N/a	
July 27	K Brosas	New Frontier Theater	Quezon	25K	—N/a	
July 31	Bini, Darren Espanto, Maki, Mayonnaise, Gary Valenciano	Araneta Coliseum	Quezon	Alagang Suki Fest	—N/a	
August 1–3	Ballet Philippines, Manila Symphony Orchestra	The Theatre at Solaire	Parañaque	Peter and the Wolf and Little Red Riding Hood	—N/a	
August 8–9	Regine Velasquez, Vice Ganda	Araneta Coliseum	Quezon	Super Divas	—N/a	
August 9	Manila Symphony Orchestra	British School Manila – Bayanihan Hall Creative Arts Center	Taguig	Brazilian Guitar & Cello	Conducted by Marlon Chen	
August 9	G22, Sarah Geronimo, The Itchyworms, Kamikazee, Maki, Pinoy Big Brother: Celebrity Collab Edition contestants, SB19	SM Mall of Asia Arena	Pasay	Acer Day 2025: Break the Limit	—N/a	
August 9–10	TJ Monterde	Limketkai Center – Atrium	Cagayan de Oro	Sarili Nating Mundo	With special guest, KZ Tandingan	
August 10	Pinoy Big Brother: Celebrity Collab Edition contestants	Araneta Coliseum	Quezon	The Big Col-Love	—N/a	
August 15	Gian Magdangal, Lara Maigue	Music Museum	San Juan	The Greatest Duets 3: OPM Naman!	—N/a	
August 15	Earl Agustin, Amiel Sol, Cup of Joe, Maris Racal	Newport Performing Arts Theater	Pasay	Yugto: Buhay at Pag-ibig	—N/a	
August 15	Viva Artists Agency artists	Araneta Coliseum	Quezon	Vivarkada	—N/a	
August 21	Lani Misalucha	The Theatre at Solaire	Parañaque	Still Lani: The 40th Anniversary Concert	—N/a	
August 22–24	Ballet Manila	Aliw Theater	Pasay	Don Quixote	—N/a	
August 23	Bituin Escalante, Jed Madela, Sofronio Vasquez	The Theatre at Solaire	Parañaque	Bravo! Manila	—N/a	
August 29–30	Bayanihan Philippine National Folk Dance Company	Metropolitan Theater	Manila	Heritage: Reimagined	—N/a	
August 30–31	FILharmoniKA	The Theatre at Solaire	Parañaque	Star Wars: The Empire Strikes Back in Concert	Conducted by Gerard Salonga	
September 5	Alamat, Bini, Alex Bruce Dionela, Ena Mori, Lauv, Mrld, Over October	Araneta Coliseum	Quezon	Coke Studio at the Big Dome	—N/a	
September 5	Nonoy Zuñiga	Newport Performing Arts Theater	Pasay	Beyond Gold	—N/a	
September 6	Janine Teñoso	New Frontier Theater	Quezon	Janine	—N/a	
September 6	Gracenote	Teatrino Promenade	San Juan	Walang Makakapigil	—N/a	/a
September 12	Philippine Philharmonic Orchestra	Metropolitan Theater	Manila	PPO 41st Concert I – Ouverture	Conducted by Grzegorz Nowak	
September 12 – October 12	Tanghalang Pilipino	Tanghalang Ignacio Gimenez, CCP Complex	Pasay	Pingkian: Isang Musikal	—N/a	
September 12–13	Ice Seguerra	Newport Performing Arts Theater	Pasay	Being Ice: Live!	—N/a	
September 13	Bo Cerrudo, Mitch Valdes, Nanette Inventor, Celeste Legaspi, Leah Navarro, Pat Castillo, Pinky Marquez, Ding Mercado	SM Aura – Samsung Hall	Taguig	Into the Groove	—N/a	
September 13–14	TJ Monterde	Santa Rosa Sports Complex	Santa Rosa	Sarili Nating Mundo	With special guest, KZ Tandingan	
September 14	Jaya	New Frontier Theater	Quezon	All Hits	—N/a	
September 19	Freestyle	Newport Performing Arts Theater	Pasay	It's About Time	With special guest, Neocolours	
September 19	Philippine Philharmonic Orchestra	Metropolitan Theater	Manila	PPO 41st Concert II – Le Retour	Conducted by Grzegorz Nowak	
September 20	Noel Cabangon	Music Museum	San Juan	Songs for Hope	—N/a	
September 26	Klarisse de Guzman	Araneta Coliseum	Quezon	The Big Night	—N/a	
September 26 – October 19	9Works Theatrical Production	Rockwell Center – Proscenium Theater	Makati	The Bodyguard: The Musical	—N/a	
September 27	Dulce	Maybank Performing Arts Theater	Taguig	Dulce: Waging Wagi! All Hits Series	—N/a	
October 3–4	Clara Benin	Metropolitan Theater	Manila	Born on a Rainy Night	—N/a	
October 3–5	Ballet Manila	Aliw Theater	Pasay	Florante at Laura	—N/a	
October 4	BGYO	New Frontier Theater	Quezon	BGYO: Now	—N/a	
October 10	Mariane Osabel, Hannah Precillas	Music Museum	San Juan	Versus	—N/a	
October 10–11	Cup of Joe	Araneta Coliseum	Quezon	Stardust	—N/a	
October 11	MNL48	Teatrino Promenade	San Juan	Dream Beyond	—N/a	
October 15	Manila Symphony Orchestra	GSIS Building – GSIS Theater	Pasay	MSO Concerto Competition 2025 Concert of Winners	—N/a	
October 17	Philippine Philharmonic Orchestra	Metropolitan Theater	Manila	PPO 41st Concert III — Concerto	Conducted by Grzegorz Nowak	
October 18	Kean Cipriano, Juris Fernandez, Duncan Ramos, Ice Seguerra, Sitti, Princess Velasco, Nyoy Volante	The Theatre at Solaire	Parañaque	Love, Sessionistas: The Repeat	—N/a	
October 18	Kyla	Circuit Makati – Samsung Performing Arts Theater	Makati	The Kyla Soundscape	—N/a	
October 18	Arman Ferrer, Shiela Valderrama	Maybank Performing Arts Theater	Taguig	As We Are	—N/a	
October 18	Will Ashley	New Frontier Theater	Quezon	Will Ashley Live!	—N/a	
October 19	Autotelic, The Dawn, Kjwan, Lola Amour, Tanya Markova	SM City North EDSA – Skydome	Quezon	Koolpals: Rock n LOL!	—N/a	
October 24	Join the Club, Mayonnaise, Mojofly, Rivermaya, Silent Sanctuary, Soapdish, Stonefree, Tanya Markova	SM City North EDSA – Skydome	Quezon	Back to the Millenials	—N/a	
October 24	Frenchie Dy	Music Museum	San Juan	Here to Stay	—N/a	
October 25	GenZix	Music Museum	San Juan	Genezis: First Chapter	—N/a	
October 25	Philippine Philharmonic Orchestra	Circuit Makati – Samsung Performing Arts Theater	Makati	OST Symphony Concert II: K-Drama in Concert	—N/a	
October 26	SB19	Araneta Coliseum	Quezon	Fast Zone	With special guest, Sarah Geronimo	
October 28	Morissette	Araneta Coliseum	Quezon	Ember	—N/a	
November 4	D'Legends Philippines	Araneta Coliseum	Quezon	D'Legends on the Dance Floor: The Grand Dance Reunion	—N/a	
November 7	Maki	Araneta Coliseum	Quezon	Kolorcoaster	—N/a	
November 7	The Company	Music Museum	San Juan	The Company in Love Local	—N/a	
November 7	Ogie Alcasid, Odette Quesada	SM Mall of Asia Arena	Pasay	Q and A	—N/a	
November 8	Jona	SM Mall of Asia Arena	Pasay	Jona: Journey to the Arena	—N/a	
November 8–9	FILharmoniKA	The Theatre at Solaire	Parañaque	One Piece Music Symphony	Conducted by a guest conductor	
November 14	Philippine Philharmonic Orchestra	Circuit Makati – Samsung Performing Arts Theater	Makati	PPO 41st Concert IV — Triumph and Thanksgiving	Conducted by Grzegorz Nowak	
November 14–December 14	Tanghalang Pilipino	Tanghalang Ignacio B. Gimenez, CCP Complex	Pasay	Gregoria Lakambini: A Pinay Pop Musical	—N/a	
November 15	Ebe Dancel	New Frontier Theater	Quezon	Ebe Dancel: The Repeat	With special guest, The Manila String Machine	
November 16	Ryan Cayabyab, Lani Misalucha, Martin Nievera, Ryan Cayabyab Singers	Rockwell Center – Proscenium	Makati	MaestroClass Concert	—N/a	
November 20	Aegis	Newport Performing Arts Theater	Pasay	The Best of Aegis	—N/a	
November 20–30	Nino Alejandro, Geneva Cruz, David Ezra, Sheila Ferrer, Jeffrey Hidalgo, Jeff Pangan	GSIS Building – GSIS Theater	Pasay	Jeproks: Mga Awitin ni Mike Hanopol	—N/a	
November 21	Dionela	New Frontier Theater	Quezon	The Grace	—N/a	
November 23	1st.One	SM City North EDSA – Skydome	Quezon	1st.One: All In	—N/a	
November 28	Chad Borja	Music Museum	San Juan	All That Sound	—N/a	
November 28	Raymond Lauchengco	The Theatre at Solaire	Parañaque	Everybody Loves Raymond	—N/a	
November 28	Jed Madela	Iloilo Convention Center	Iloilo	Superhero	—N/a	
November 29	Bini	Philippine Arena	Bocaue	Binified	—N/a	
November 29	Manila Symphony Orchestra, Philippine Madrigal Singers	Circuit Makati – Samsung Performing Arts Theater	Makati	MPO Rocks! with the Philippine Madrigal Singers	—N/a	
November 29 – December 21	9Works Theatrical Production	Rockwell Center – Proscenium Theater	Makati	A Christmas Carol	—N/a	
November 30	Ben&Ben, Maki, Over October, other various artists	People Power Monument	Quezon	Trillion Peso March	—N/a	
December 3	Gerald Santos	Newport Performing Arts Theater	Pasay	Gerald Santos: Dreams	—N/a	
December 3	The Clones of Eat Bulaga! contestants	Music Museum	San Juan	Santa Clones Are Coming to Town	Directed by Ice Seguerra	
December 4	SexBomb Girls	Araneta Coliseum	Quezon	SexBomb Girls: The Reunion	—N/a	
December 5	Adie, Amiel Sol, Rob Deniel, Arthur Nery	Araneta Coliseum	Quezon	RAAA!	—N/a	
December 5–7	Ballet Philippines	The Theatre at Solaire	Parañaque	Alice in Wonderland	—N/a	
December 7	Alamat, Rico Blanco, December Avenue, Gloc-9, Sassa Dagdag	SM City Pampanga – Amphitheatre	Angeles	Agus: A Night of Music	—N/a	
December 8	True Faith	Newport Performing Arts Theater	Pasay	Thirty-Three: True Faith 33rd Anniversary Concert	—N/a	
December 9	Nonoy Zuñiga	Newport Performing Arts Theater	Pasay	Beyond Gold: The Repeat	—N/a	
December 9	SexBomb Girls	SM Mall of Asia Arena	Pasay	SexBomb Girls: Rawnd Two	—N/a	
December 10–11	Jose Mari Chan, Apo Hiking Society, The Company, Kuh Ledesma, Martin Nievera, Gary Valenciano, Regine Velasquez	Newport Performing Arts Theater	Pasay	Here and Now: Celebrating the Music of Jose Mari Chan	—N/a	
December 11	Amplify Acapella	Teatrino Promenade	San Juan	I'm Dreamin' of an Amplify Christmas	—N/a	
December 12–13	IV of Spades	SM Mall of Asia Arena	Pasay	IV of Spades Live at the MOA Arena	—N/a	
December 12–13	Tanya Markova	Music Museum	San Juan	Tanya Markova: XV	—N/a	
December 13–14	FILharmoniKA	The Theatre at Solaire	Parañaque	How to Train Your Dragon in Concert	Conducted by Thanapol Setabrahmana of the Thailand Philharmonic Orchestra	
December 23	Various groups	SM City North EDSA – Skydome	Quezon	Sulong! P-pop	—N/a	
December 25–29	Ballet Manila	Aliw Theater	Pasay	Snow White	—N/a	
December 27	SPIT Manila	The Theatre at Solaire	Parañaque	SPIT Tayo!: Sana Palaging Isang Team Tayo!	—N/a	
December 30	Juan Karlos, Eliza Maturan, Zack Tabudlo	Marikina Sports Center	Marikina	Marikina Year-End Concert	—N/a	

=== International artists ===
Date(s)	Headliner(s)	Venue	City	Event / Tour	Note(s)	Ref(s)
January 1–5	Various	SM Mall of Asia Arena	Pasay	Disney on Ice: Find Your Hero	—N/a	
January 8	St. Vincent	Filinvest Tent	Muntinlupa	All Born Screaming Tour	Part of the Karpos Live Series.	
January 14	Cigarettes After Sex	SM Mall of Asia Arena	Pasay	X's World Tour	—N/a	
January 14	Phantom Siita	SM Aura – Samsung Hall	Taguig	Moth to a Flame	—N/a	
January 18–19	Seventeen	Philippine Sports Stadium	Bocaue	Right Here World Tour	Jeonghan and Jun did not participate due to individual priorities, particularly Jeonghan's mandatory conscription and Jun's acting career.	
January 24	Dionne Warwick	New Frontier Theater	Quezon	Dionne Warwick: One Last Time	—N/a	
January 24	Regina Song	Jess & Pat's	Quezon	Fangirl: Live in Manila	—N/a	
January 25	Regina Song	Sari-Sari Cocktails	Makati	Fangirl: Live in Manila	With special guests Clara Benin, Syd Hartha, dwta and Muri.	
January 25	Maroon 5	SM Mall of Asia Arena	Pasay	Maroon 5 Asia Tour 2025	With DJ Mailbox and Culture Wars as the opening acts.	
January 26	N.Flying	New Frontier Theater	Quezon	Hide Out Tour	—N/a	
January 31	Aurora	New Frontier Theater	Quezon	What Happened to the Earth?	With Yaelokre and Ena Mori as the opening acts.	
February 1	Kolohe Kai	SM Aura – Samsung Hall	Taguig	Kolohe Kai: Live	Part of the Insignia Concert Series.	
February 1	Elliot James Reay	Market! Market!	Taguig	Elliot James Reay: Live in Manila	—N/a	
February 8	Steelheart, White Lion	Hoops Dome	Lapu-Lapu	Legends of Rock: Live in Cebu	—N/a	
February 8	The Brand New Heavies	Circuit Makati – Samsung Performing Arts Theater	Makati	The Brand New Heavies Live in Manila	—N/a	
February 11–12	Niki	SM Mall of Asia Arena	Pasay	Buzz World Tour	With Reality Club as the opening act.	
February 11–12	The Script	Araneta Coliseum	Quezon	Satellites World Tour	—N/a	
February 12	Hoobastank	SM Aura – Samsung Hall	Taguig	Hoobastank Live	With Typecast as the opening act. Originally planned to take place at the New Frontier Theater.	
February 12	A1	SM City Bacolod – SMX Convention Center	Bacolod	Valentine's Tour 2025	—N/a	
February 12	Ronan Keating	Waterfront Hotel & Casino	Cebu	Ronan Keating: A Valentine's Special	—N/a	
February 13	Ronan Keating	New Frontier Theater	Quezon	Ronan Keating: A Valentine's Special	—N/a	
February 13	A1	SM City Cagayan de Oro – SMX Convention Center	Cagayan de Oro	Valentine's Tour 2025	—N/a	
February 15	A1	New Frontier Theater	Quezon	Valentine's Tour 2025	—N/a	
February 15	Flowerovlove	Trinoma	Quezon	Flowerovlove Live in Manila	—N/a	
February 15–16	The Corrs	Araneta Coliseum	Quezon	The Corrs: From Manila with Love	—N/a	
February 18	Jinjer	SM City North EDSA – Skydome	Quezon	Asian Tour 2025	—N/a	
February 22	Day6	Araneta Coliseum	Quezon	Forever Young	—N/a	
February 22	Taeyang	SM Mall of Asia Arena	Pasay	The Light Year	—N/a	
February 28	Wave to Earth	SM Mall of Asia Arena	Pasay	Wave to Earth Live	—N/a	
March 1	Enhypen	Philippine Sports Stadium	Bocaue	Walk The Line Tour	—N/a	
March 1	Niki	Araneta Coliseum	Quezon	Buzz World Tour	—N/a	
March 2	Jay B	SMX Convention Center	Pasay	Tape: Re Load	—N/a	
March 4	Keshi	SM Mall of Asia Arena	Pasay	Requiem	—N/a	
March 8–9	Mark Doyle, Moony	Century City Mall – Stratosphere Events Place	Makati	Hedkandi 25th Global Anniversary Party	—N/a	
March 9	Mike Love	Draft Punk Craft Cafe	Cebu	Mike Love in Cebu	—N/a	
March 14	Jisoo	Araneta Coliseum	Quezon	Lights, Love, Action!	—N/a	
March 16	Choi Min-ho	New Frontier Theater	Quezon	Mean:Of My First	—N/a	
March 21	Manu Chao	SM Aura – Samsung Hall	Taguig	Manu Chao Concert Tour	—N/a	
March 22	BoyNextDoor	Araneta Coliseum	Quezon	Knock On Vol.1 Tour	—N/a	
March 22	Lee Chang-sub	SM City North EDSA – Skydome	Quezon	The Wayfarer in Manila	—N/a	
March 29	Taeyeon	SM Mall of Asia Arena	Pasay	The Tense	—N/a	
March 30	Nick Carter	New Frontier Theater	Quezon	Who I Am World Tour	—N/a	
April 3	Stephen Speaks	Newport World Resorts – Bar 360	Pasay	Stephen Speaks at Bar 360	—N/a	
April 4	Kiss of Life	UP Theater	Quezon	Kiss Road in Asia	—N/a	
April 4	Big Mountain	Mango Square Mall	Cebu	Big Mountain Live	—N/a	
April 5	Stephen Speaks	Go SuperClub and SportsBar	Iloilo	Stephen Speaks	—N/a	
April 5	Kyuhyun	New Frontier Theater	Quezon	Kyuhyun 10th Anniversary Asia Tour	—N/a	
April 11	State Champs	SM Southmall – Events Hall	Las Piñas	Asia Tour	—N/a	
April 12	NCT Wish	New Frontier Theater	Quezon	2025 NCT Wish Asia Tour: Log In	—N/a	
April 12	Peder Elias	Greenhills – Teatrino Promenade	San Juan	Peder Elias Asia Tour 2025	—N/a	
April 12–13	J-Hope	SM Mall of Asia Arena	Pasay	Hope on the Stage Tour	—N/a	
April 16	Nervosa	SM City North EDSA – Skydome	Quezon	15 Years of Nervosa: Asia-Pacific Tour	—N/a	
April 25–27	Moonbug Entertainment	New Frontier Theater	Quezon	Cocomelon Sing-a-long Live	—N/a	
April 26	Pamungkas, Scrubb	Mandala Park – 123 Block	Mandaluyong	GNN10 presents: Pamungkas x Scrubb	—N/a	
May 1–2	M2M	Araneta Coliseum	Quezon	The Better Endings Tour	—N/a	
May 2	Nmixx	SMX Convention Center	Pasay	Nmixx Change Up : Mixx Lab	—N/a	
May 3	M2M	SM City Davao – SMX Convention Center	Davao	The Better Endings Tour	—N/a	
May 4	M2M	Waterfront Hotel & Casino	Cebu	The Better Endings Tour	—N/a	
May 4	Toto	SM Mall of Asia Arena	Pasay	Dogz of Oz Tour	With special guest Arnel Pineda.	
May 8	Ado	SM Mall of Asia Arena	Pasay	Ado World Tour 2025: Hibana	—N/a	
May 11	Neck Deep	New Frontier Theater	Quezon	Neck Deep Live	—N/a	
May 16	D4vd	SM Mall of Asia	Pasay	WITHERED Album Showcase	—N/a	
May 17	G-Dragon	Philippine Arena	Bocaue	Übermensch World Tour	—N/a	
May 18	Boyz II Men	Araneta Coliseum	Quezon	Boyz II Men Live in Manila	—N/a	
May 27	Snarky Puppy	Filinvest Tent	Muntinlupa	Snarky Puppy Live	Part of the Karpos Live Series.	
May 29	Luca Brugnoli, Dominic Ferris	St. Scholastica's College – St. Cecilia's Auditorium	Manila	The Encore: By Popular Demand	—N/a	
May 30–31	98 Degrees	SM Mall of Asia Arena	Pasay	98° Live in Manila	With special guests Katrina Velarde, Janine Teñoso, and Jona Viray.	
June 3	Jacob Collier	New Frontier Theater	Quezon	Djesse Vol. 4 World Tour	Originally planned to take place at the World Trade Center.	
June 7–8	CXMMXNS (Reuben Morgan and Ben Fielding)	SM Mall of Asia Arena	Pasay	Mighty to Save Tour	Featuring Aodhan King.	
June 15	Valley	New Frontier Theater	Quezon	Water the Flowers, Pray for a Garden Tour	—N/a	
June 17	J.R. Richards	SMOQUE Bistro + Cafe &bar	Tagbilaran	J.R. Richards Live	—N/a	
June 18	J.R. Richards	Social Park Avenue	Cebu	J.R. Richards Live	—N/a	
June 18	Al McKay	Newport Performing Arts Theater	Pasay	Earth, Wind & Fire by Al McKay	—N/a	
June 21	J.R. Richards	Stratosphere Events Place, Century Mall	Makati	J.R. Richards Live	—N/a	
June 28	Jay Park	New Frontier Theater	Quezon	Serenades & Body Rolls	—N/a	
July 11	Keala Settle	Circuit Makati – Samsung Performing Arts Theater	Makati	This is Me: An Evening with Keala Settle	—N/a	
July 15	Kenny G	New Frontier Theater	Quezon	Kenny G Live: A Saxy Acoustic Night	—N/a	
July 18	Slchld	Greenhills – Teatrino Promenade	San Juan	Slchld Live!	—N/a	
July 21	Faye Webster	Filinvest Tent	Muntinlupa	Faye Webster Live in Manila	Part of the Karpos Live Series.	
July 24	My First Story	New Frontier Theater	Quezon	My First Story Asia Tour 2025	—N/a	
July 25–26	Planetshakers	SM Mall of Asia Arena	Pasay	Abundance Tour	—N/a	
July 25	Elijah Woods	SM Aura – Samsung Hall	Taguig	Give Me the Sunlight Tour	—N/a	
July 26	Elijah Woods	IC3 Convention Center	Cebu	Give Me the Sunlight Tour	—N/a	
July 27	Tiffany Young	SM Aura – Samsung Hall	Taguig	Here for You	—N/a	
July 27	Kai	Araneta Coliseum	Quezon	Kai Solo Concert Tour: Kaion	—N/a	
August 2	Le Sserafim	SM Mall of Asia Arena	Pasay	Easy Crazy Hot Tour	—N/a	
August 6	Various artists	SM Mall of Asia Arena	Pasay	KOSTCon 2025	—N/a	
August 12–13	Beabadoobee	New Frontier Theater	Quezon	Asia Tour 2025	With special guest Jim Paredes on August 13.	
August 15	Real Friends	Bar IX	Muntinlupa	Southeast Asia Tour 2025	With special guest Summerlane.	
August 16	D.O	SM Mall of Asia Arena	Pasay	Doh Kyung-soo Asia Concert Tour: Do it!	—N/a	
August 24	Yoon San-ha	SM City North EDSA – Skydome	Quezon	Prism	—N/a	
August 25	Jang Dong-woo	SM City North EDSA – Skydome	Quezon	Connection	—N/a	
August 27	Black Eyed Peas	SM Mall of Asia Arena	Pasay	Black Eyed Peas Live in Manila	—N/a	
August 28	Tinashe	New Frontier Theater	Quezon	Match My Freak: World Tour	—N/a	
August 30	AHOF	Araneta Coliseum	Quezon	Rendezvous	—N/a	
September 2	Yves	SM Aura – Samsung Hall	Taguig	Cosmic Crispy	—N/a	
September 4–28	Various	The Theatre at Solaire	Parañaque	Dear Evan Hansen	—N/a	
September 5	Dabda	Sari Sari	Makati	Dabda: Live in Manila	With special guests Gabba and (e)motion engine.	
September 6	David Benoit	Newport Performing Arts Theater	Pasay	Encore by David Benoit	With special guests Lara Maigue and Gian Magdangal.	
September 15	Eric Martin	Cafe Shylo	Pasig	Unleashed & Unplugged	With special guest David Cotterill.	
September 18–19	Air Supply	Solaire – Grand Ballroom	Parañaque	Air Supply: 50th Anniversary Celebration	—N/a	
September 20–21	Tyler, the Creator	Araneta Coliseum	Quezon	Chromakopia: The World Tour	With Paris Texas as the opening act.	
September 24	Mayday Parade	Araneta Coliseum	Quezon	Three Cheers for 20 Years Tour	—N/a	
September 29	The Smashing Pumpkins	Araneta Coliseum	Quezon	Rock Invasion Tour	—N/a	
October 1	Eric Martin	Social Park Avenue	Cebu	Unleashed & Unplugged	With special guest David Cotterill. Despite the recent tragedy caused by the earthquake in the Cebu province, the show went go on.	
October 4	Super Junior	SM Mall of Asia Arena	Pasay	Super Show 10	—N/a	
October 4	Twice	Philippine Arena	Bocaue	This Is For World Tour	Jeongyeon will not participate due to health reasons.	
October 8	Babymetal	Araneta Coliseum	Quezon	Babymetal World Tour 2025	—N/a	
October 14	Mariah Carey	SM Mall of Asia Arena	Pasay	The Celebration of Mimi	—N/a	
October 18	Baekhyun	SM Mall of Asia Arena	Pasay	Reverie	—N/a	
October 24	Per Sørensen	The Theatre at Solaire	Parañaque	The Voice of Fra Lippo Lippi: Per Sorensen	—N/a	
October 24	Dept	Greenhills – Teatrino Promenade	San Juan	Dept Live!	—N/a	
October 24	Various artists	SM Lanang – SMX Convention Center	Davao	The ABBA Reunion Tribute Show	—N/a	
October 27	Babyface, Patti Austin	SM Mall of Asia Arena	Pasay	Babyface and Patti Austin's Greatest Hits	Originally scheduled on July 14, but was changed due to accommodate adjustments including additional dates in his Southeast Asian tour.	
October 28	Libera	Aliw Theater	Pasay	Libera: Back at Last!	—N/a	
October 29	Various artists	Solaire Resort North	Quezon City	The ABBA Reunion Tribute Show	—N/a	
October 30	Various artists	Jose Rizal Coliseum	Calamba	The ABBA Reunion Tribute Show	—N/a	
October 31 – November 23	Various	Newport Performing Arts Theater	Pasay	Shrek the Musical	—N/a	
November 2	Jackson Wang	Araneta Coliseum	Quezon	Magicman 2	—N/a	
November 7	Engelbert Humperdinck	Waterfront Hotel & Casino	Cebu	The Last Waltz: The Farewell Tour	—N/a	
November 8	Greyson Chance	Greenhills – Teatrino Promenade	San Juan	The Gold Tour	With special guest Mila Bea.	
November 12	Michael Learns to Rock	University of Southeastern Philippines	Davao	Encore All the Hits	—N/a	
November 14	Michael Learns to Rock	Waterfront Hotel & Casino	Cebu	Encore All the Hits	—N/a	
November 15	Hillsong London	TBA	Davao	Hillsong London: Asia Tour	—N/a	
November 15	Nam Woo-hyun	SM Aura – Samsung Hall	Taguig	Tree High School	—N/a	
November 16	Jae Park	SM Aura – Samsung Hall	Taguig	The 1/9 Tour	—N/a	
November 16	Hatsune Miku	SM Mall of Asia Arena	Pasay	Miku Expo	—N/a	
November 18	Michael Learns to Rock	SM Mall of Asia Arena	Pasay	Encore All the Hits	—N/a	
November 20	Hillsong London	TBA	Cebu	Hillsong London: Asia Tour	—N/a	
November 21	Hillsong London	TBA	Bacolod	Hillsong London: Asia Tour	—N/a	
November 22	Jason Derulo	SM Mall of Asia Arena	Pasay	Jason Derulo in Manila	—N/a	
November 22–23	Blackpink	Philippine Arena	Bocaue	Deadline World Tour	—N/a	
November 23	Hillsong London	SMDC Concert Grounds	Parañaque	Hillsong London: Asia Tour	—N/a	
November 25	Alesana	SM City North EDSA – Skydome	Quezon	Alesana Live!	—N/a	
November 27	TV Girl	New Frontier Theater	Quezon	TV Girl 'Perform Their Hits Live!'	—N/a	
November 29	Jeremy Zucker	New Frontier Theater	Quezon	Garden State	—N/a	
November 30	Midori	Ayala Museum	Makati	Midori in Manila	—N/a	
December 3	Tyla	SM Mall of Asia Arena	Pasay	We Wanna Party Tour	—N/a	
December 7	Doja Cat	SM Mall of Asia Arena	Pasay	Ma Vie World Tour	—N/a	
December 8	Rich Brian	New Frontier Theater	Quezon	Where Is My Head? Tour	—N/a	
December 9	Secondhand Serenade	Waterfront Hotel & Casino	Cebu	Playback Presents: A Secondhand Symphony – the 20th Anniversary of Awake	—N/a	
December 11	Secondhand Serenade	SM City Davao – SMX Convention Center	Davao	Playback Presents: A Secondhand Symphony – the 20th Anniversary of Awake	—N/a	
December 12	The Fray	Araneta Coliseum	Quezon	How to Save a Life: 20th Anniversary Tour	—N/a	
December 13	The Cab	New Frontier Theater	Quezon	Playback Presents: The Cab	—N/a	
December 14	Secondhand Serenade	New Frontier Theater	Quezon	Playback Presents: A Secondhand Symphony – the 20th Anniversary of Awake	—N/a	
December 15	All-4-One	SM Lanang – SMX Convention Center	Davao	All-4-One Live in Davao	—N/a	
December 20–30	Various	SM Mall of Asia Arena	Pasay	Disney on Ice: Magic in the Stars	—N/a	
December 29	Chloe Foston	City of Dreams – Grand Ballroom	Parañaque	The Carpenters: Reborn	—N/a	

=== Music festivals ===
Date(s)	Event	Venue	City	Notable performers	Note(s)	Ref(s)
January 18–19	Sinulog at the Manor	Queensland Manor	Cebu	December Avenue; Dionela; various DJs	—N/a	
January 19	Rock'It (Roots, Rock, Reggae) Festival	Atmosphere Dine Sports Bar & KTV	Cebu	Gabby Alipe; Junior Kilat; Supitsados	Franco was also part of the original lineup but had to cancel their appearance after the band's main vocalist (Franco Reyes) was suffered in an accident.	
January 19	G Music Fest at the Sinulog Festival	Ayala Center Cebu	Cebu	Denise Julia; Other various artists	Part of the G Music Fest series by Globe Telecom	
January 26	G Music Fest at the Dinagyang Festival	Sunburst Park	Iloilo	Al James; Other various artists	Part of the G Music Fest series by Globe Telecom	
February 13–15	BarakoFest 2025	Manila-Batangas Bypass Road	Lipa	Hev Abi; KZ Tandingan; Vice Ganda	—N/a	
February 22–23	Waterbomb festival	Quirino Grandstand	Manila	Baekho; BamBam; B.I; Dynamic Duo; Epik High; Gray; Hwasa; Hyolyn; Kang Daniel; Kim Jong-kook; Kwon Eun-bi; Lee Chae-yeon; Oh My Girl; Reddy; RGP; STAYC; Sunmi; U-Kwon; Viviz; Yang Se-chan	—N/a	
February 22	SM Fandom OPM Series – Hip Hop Fest	SM City North EDSA – Skydome	Quezon	Ron Henley; Al James	Part of the SM Fandom OPM Series.	
February 23	Plus63 Festival	Aseana City	Parañaque	Kehlani; James Reid	—N/a	
March 8	Malasimbo Music and Arts Festival	Intramuros	Manila	François K; Mike Love	It is the festival's first iteration since 2020.	
March 15	Fusion: The Philippine Music Festival	CCP Complex	Pasay	Alamat; Allmo$t; Barbie Almalbis; Ben&Ben; December Avenue; The Itchyworms; Kaia; Maki; Zack Tabudlo	This marks the 10th anniversary event.	
March 15	Red Horse Beer Pambansang Muziklaban Finals	Paseo de Santa Rosa	Santa Rosa	Chicosci; Dilaw; Greyhoundz; Mayonnaise; Razorback	—N/a	
March 22–23	Wanderland Music and Arts Festival	Filinvest City Event Grounds	Muntinlupa	Daniel Caesar; Chet Faker; Dilaw; Hermitude; Honne; Mayonnaise; The Paper Kites; Plain White T's; Sinosikat?; Regina Song; Urbandub	This marks the 10th anniversary event.	
March 25	Circus Music Festival 6	Bridgetowne Concert Grounds	Pasig	Adie; Al James; Autotelic; Zild Benitez; Kean Cipriano; Dionela; Flow G; Freestyle; The Itchyworms; Maki; Mayonnaise; Arthur Nery; Rivermaya; Unique Salonga; Blaster Silonga; South Border; Urbandub	Part of the Circus Music Festival	
March 29	Splash Rave: The Songkran Festival	Okada Manila – Cove Manila	Parañaque	Various DJs	—N/a	
April 2–5	UP Fair 2025	University of the Philippines Diliman – Sunken Garden	Quezon	6cyclemind; Abra; Adie; Autotelic; Ace Banzuelo; Ben&Ben; Clara Benin; Yeng Constantino; Cup of Joe; December Avenue; Gloc-9; Gracenote; The Itchyworms; Mayonnaise; Morissette; Munimuni; Kitchie Nadal; Over October; Precious Paula Nicole; James Reid; The Ridleys; This Band; Unique Salonga; Sponge Cola	The aggregated event for the 2025 edition is divided into 4 events: Kalye Tunes (Wednesday, April 2); Quests (Thursday, April 3); Elements (Friday, April 4); REV Music Festival (Saturday, April 5)	
April 4–5	All of the Noise	The Astbury	Makati	Ena Mori; Pedicab; SOS; Various artists from Asia	The event marks the 10th anniversary of The Rest is Noise.	
April 4–5	Taguig Music Festival	Arca South Open Grounds	Taguig	Rico Blanco; Ebe Dancel; Dionela; Lola Amour; Mayonnaise; Armi Millare; Nobita; This Band	—N/a	
April 11–13	Lubao International Balloon and Music Festival	Pradera Verde	Lubao	Al James; Alamat; Bamboo; Ben&Ben; Darren Espanto; Mayonnaise; Kyle Echarri; Juan Karlos; The Juans; Lola Amour; James Reid; Silent Sanctuary; Skusta Clee; Zack Tabudlo	—N/a	
April 26	Castaway Music Festival 2025	SM City Pampanga	San Fernando	Dionela; Various artists	Part of the annual Castaway Music Festival series by SM Malls.	
April 26	R-18 Level Up Free Concert	Filinvest City Event Grounds	Muntinlupa	Maki; SunKissed Lola; Angela Ken	—N/a	
April 27	Summer Blast 2025	Philippine Arena	Bocaue	Earl Agustin; Yeng Constantino; Sarah Geronimo; Hori7on; I Belong to the Zoo; SunKissed Lola	Part of the annual Summer Blast series.	
May 2–3	Hydro Boracay: The TakeOver	Boracay – Station 1	Malay	Various DJs	—N/a	
May 3–4	Aurora Music Festival - Clark	Clark Global City	Angeles	BGYO; Bini; Rico Blanco; Cup of Joe; Moira Dela Torre; Dionela; Flow G; Maki; Arthur Nery; Over October	Part of the Aurora Music Festival series.	
May 9	Playback Music Festival	SM Mall of Asia Arena	Pasay	Boys Like Girls; The Click Five; Secondhand Serenade	Initially scheduled for May 8 at the SMX Convention Center Manila, but was rescheduled and relocated to May 9 at the adjacent SM Mall of Asia Arena.	
May 10	Playback Music Festival	Waterfront Hotel & Casino	Cebu	Boys Like Girls; The Click Five; Secondhand Serenade	—N/a	
May 10–11	Matsuri in Manila	Rizal Park	Manila	Lily; FuMi; James Reid; Maria Ozawa; Myrtle Sarrosa	—N/a	
May 16	Castaway Music Festival 2025	SM City Baliwag	Baliwag	Amiel Sol; Hori7on	Part of the annual Castaway Music Festival series by SM Malls.	
May 17	Minsan Fest	Quezon Memorial Circle	Quezon	Autotelic; Clara Benin; Zild Benitez; Ebe Dancel; The Itchyworms; Reese Lansangan; Mayonnaise; Sud	—N/a	
May 25	Daddy Aid	Marikina Sports Center	Marikina	6cyclemind; Ben&Ben; Moira Dela Torre; Dilaw; Gloc-9; Gracenote; Imago; Lily; Lola Amour; Moonstar88; Over October; Sandwich; Tanya Markova	—N/a	
May 30 – June 1	AndFriends Festival	Okada Manila – Crystal Pavilion	Parañaque	Bbno$; Ylona Garcia; Zedd	—N/a	
June 7	Anisama World 2025 Manila	Araneta Coliseum	Quezon	Ave Mujica; Flow; Hiroshi Kitadani; Mayu Maeshima; MindaRyn; Toshiya Miyata; Nobodyknows	—N/a	
June 7	Break the Silence Music Festival	Parklinks	Pasig	December Avenue; Juan Karlos; Zack Tabudlo	—N/a	
June 14–15	Malaya Music Fest	Okada Manila – Cove Manila	Parañaque	Ely Buendia; I Belong to the Zoo; Kamikazee; Mayonnaise; Sandwich; Silent Sanctuary	—N/a	
June 14–15	Bicol Loco Music Festival	Legazpi Airport	Legazpi	Earl Agustin; Rico Blanco; Hev Abi; Kim Ji Soo; SB19; Zack Tabudlo	—N/a	
June 21	Fête de la Musique Philippines 2025	Ayala Triangle Gardens	Makati	Ely Buendia; Ito Kashitaro; Leanne & Naara; Armi Millare; Ena Mori; James Reid; The Ridleys; Janine	—N/a	
June 21	Fête de la Musique Philippines 2025	Ayala Malls Central Bloc	Cebu	Various artists	—N/a	
June 27	Fête de la Musique Philippines 2025	Various venues	Makati	Various artists	Pocket stages in various venues	
June 28	Fête de la Musique Philippines 2025	Various venues across the Philippines		Various artists	Pocket stages in various venues	
June 28	LOV3LABAN: 2025 Pride March and Festival	University of the Philippines Diliman – Sunken Garden	Quezon	Alamat; Janine Berdin; BGYO; Brigiding; Klarisse de Guzman; Michelle Dee; Viñas DeLuxe; G22; Gian and Rapha of Cup of Joe; Dia Maté; Precious Paula Nicole; Eva Le Queen; Pura Luka Vega	—N/a	
September 5	Coke Studio PH Live	Araneta Coliseum	Quezon	Alamat; Bini; Lauv; Ena Mori; Mrld; Over October	—N/a	
September 12–13	Dutdutan 2025 Philippine Tattoo Expo	World Trade Center	Pasay	Various rock artists	—N/a	
October 10	Fusion: The Philippine Music Festival - ElBi	University of the Philippines Los Baños – Upper Grounds	Los Baños	Earl Agustin; Alamat; December Avenue; Kaia	—N/a	
October 18	Fusion: The Philippine Music Festival - Cebu	SM Seaside City	Cebu	Al James; Cup of Joe; Urbandub	—N/a	
October 25	Aurora Music Festival – Davao	Crocodile Farm Concert Ground	Davao	Bini; Rob Deniel; Maki; Amiel Sol	Part of the Aurora Music Festival series.	
October 31	Bigfish: Cream Halloween Ball 2025	SM Mall of Asia Arena	Pasay	Dash Berlin; Various international DJs	This marks the return of Bigfish events since 2016.	
October 31	AndFriends Halloween 2025	Okada Manila – Crystal Pavilion	Parañaque	Various DJs	—N/a	
November 8	KISLAP Music Festival	Sta. Rosa Multi-Purpose Complex	Santa Rosa	Rico Blanco; Ebe Dancel; The Ridleys	—N/a	
November 21	Playback: Pop It Up Music Festival	SM Mall of Asia Arena	Pasay	David Archuleta; Blue; Vanessa Carlton	—N/a	
November 22	Aurora Music Festival – Cebu	City di Mare	Cebu	Earl Agustin; Ben&Ben; Rico Blanco; Cup of Joe; Maki; SB19	Part of the Aurora Music Festival series.	
November 28–30	Pinoy Playlist Music Festival 2025	BGC Arts Center	Taguig	Various artists	—N/a	
December 6	JBL Sound Fest 2025	Parklinks	Pasig	Rico Blanco; Cup of Joe; Flow G; Hori7on	—N/a	
December 6	Maginhawa Arts and Food Festival	Maginhawa	Quezon	Autotelic; Clara Benin; Syd Hartha; Mrld; Over October; Sud; Taylor Sheesh; Viñas DeLuxe	—N/a	
December 19	Maskipaps: the Crossover 2025	Sunken Garden, University of the Philippines Diliman	Quezon	Al James; Cup of Joe; December Avenue; Angela Ken; Maki; Over October; Sponge Cola; The Ridleys	—N/a	

=== New Year's Eve events (December 31) ===
Event / Tour	Venue	City	Headliner(s)	Note(s)	Ref(s)
Step Right Up to 2026	Okada Manila – Cove Manila	Parañaque	Yeng Constantino; Tom Taus; Gary Valenciano	Hosted by Randy Santiago and Regine Tolentino	
Symphony of the Stars	Solaire – Grand Ballroom	Parañaque	FILharmoniKA; Raymond Lauchengco; Lea Salonga	—N/a	
The Grand Countdown to 2026	Newport World Resorts	Pasay	Earl Agustin; Bamboo; Billy Crawford; Cup of Joe; GAT; Sarah Geronimo; Matteo Guidicelli; Jessica Sanchez; Amiel Sol; Janine Teñoso	—N/a	
Kapuso Countdown to 2026	SM Mall of Asia	Pasay	AHOF; Various artists from GMA/Sparkle	Also televised on GMA Network	
Bridgetowne Countdown to 2026	Bridgetowne Concert Grounds	Pasig	Bamboo; Rob Deniel; Hey June!; Imago; Angela Ken	Hosted by Macoy Dubs and MJ Lastimosa.	
Makati in Full Color – Ayala Avenue New Year's Eve Countdown to 2026	Ayala Avenue corner Makati Avenue	Makati	Ely Buendia; Cup of Joe; Divine Divas (Brigiding, Precious Paula Nicole, Viñas DeLuxe); Juan Karlos; Morissette; Sofronio Vasquez; Theatre Group Asia’s A Chorus Line cast; DJ Cupcakes	—N/a	
NYE at the 5th	5th Avenue, Bonifacio Global City	Taguig	Apl.de.ap; Dionela; G22; Jay R; Mars Miranda; TJ Monterde; Parokya ni Edgar; SB19; KZ Tandingan	—N/a	
New Year's Eve Countdown	The Palace Manila, Uptown Bonifacio	Taguig	Various DJs	—N/a	
Queezon City New Year Countdown to 2026	Quezon Memorial Circle	Quezon	Dilaw; Gloc-9; Kamikazee; Reese Lansangan; Lola Amour; Mayonnaise; Angeline Quinto	Hosted by Allan K., Pokwang and Super Tekla.	
Eastwood-QC New Year Countdown to 2026	Eastwood City	Quezon	Rico Blanco; Klarisse de Guzman; Kaia; Maki; Ena Mori	Hosted by Princess Legaspi and Martin Javier	
A Night of Icons	Solaire Resort North	Quezon	Sharon Cuneta; Rachelle Ann Go; Martin Nievera	—N/a	
Sama-sama sa 2026: The NET25 New Year’s Countdown	Philippine Arena	Bocaue	Gigi de Lana; Arnel Pineda; Shamrock; SunKissed Lola	Also televised on Net 25	

=== Cancelled/postponed shows ===
Scheduled date(s)	Headliner(s)	Venue	City	Event / Tour	Reason(s) cited	Ref(s)
February 8	Alamat; Barbie Almalbis; Sarah Geronimo; The Juans; Kaia; Arthur Nery; Over October; James Reid	Bridgetowne Open Grounds	Pasig	Enigma Music City	"Unforeseen circumstances and challenges"	
March 19	Kylie Minogue	SM Mall of Asia Arena	Pasay	Tension Tour	Undisclosed	
March 29	Hori7on; Irene; Riize; Seulgi	Araneta Coliseum	Quezon	IAM K-POP	"Unforeseen circumstances"	
June 27	Adie; Earl Agustin; Munimuni; Over October; Parokya ni Edgar; Pura Luka Vega; The Ridleys; Taylor Sheesh	Bridgetowne Concert Grounds	Pasig	Cosmos: An OPM Festival	Postponed due to foreseeable weather conditions; later cancelled.	
July 7–8	Hollywood Film Orchestra	Metropolitan Theater	Manila	The Music of Hans Zimmer & the Others	Logistical issues	
July 7	Hollywood Film Orchestra	Metropolitan Theater	Manila	The Magical Music of Harry Potter: Live in Concert	Logistical issues	
July 8	Hollywood Film Orchestra	Metropolitan Theater	Manila	The Music of the Lord of the Rings & The Hobbit: Live in Concert	Logistical issues	
October 18	Dong Abay; Basti Artadi; Eraserheads; General Luna; Imago; The Itchyworms; Moonstar88; Blaster Silonga	SMDC Concert Grounds	Parañaque	Eraserheads Electric Fun Festival	Originally scheduled on May 31, then October 18, but later postponed (rescheduled to 2026).	
December 6–7	Adie; Earl Agustin; Alamat; Ely Buendia; Bamboo; Bini; Cup of Joe; Denise Julia; Dionela; Sarah Geronimo; Gloc-9; Kamikazee; Arthur Nery; Parokya ni Edgar; Amiel Sol	SMDC Concert Grounds	Parañaque	Wonderful Moments Music Festival	Rescheduled to February 7–8, 2026 after reevaluation.	

== Deaths ==
- February 27 – Romano Trinidad (b. 1996), rapper and FlipTop emcee
- April 12 – Pilita Corrales (b. 1939), singer and actress
- April 16 – Nora Aunor (b. 1953), actress, singer, and National Artist for Film and Broadcast
- April 22 – Hajji Alejandro (b. 1954), singer and composer
- May 27 – Freddie Aguilar (b. 1953), folk singer
- October 21 – Davey Langit (b. 1986), singer-songwriter, radio DJ and reality show contestant (Pinoy Dream Academy)
- December 4 – Budoy Marabiles (b. 1971), musician
