= 2022 in Philippine music =

The following is a list of events and releases that have happened or are expected to happen in 2022 in music in the Philippines.

== Notable events ==
- January 5 – "Bazinga", from the P-pop supergroup SB19, retains its top spot in the Billboard Hot Trending Songs chart, for a fourth week at No. 1.
- February 23 – Sibling groups BGYO and Bini were featured on "Xpedition's cover that made them as the first Filipino celebrities to have a NFT magazine cover and the first ever in the Middle East region launched through the Metaverse.
- March – As COVID-19 restrictions were eased to Alert Level 1 in most parts of the country, live concerts and gigs will return for the first time in 2 years.
- April 25 – Global entertainment company Live Nation launched its Philippine branch with the acquisition of local promotion/organizer Music Management International (MMI).
- May – OPM rock band Callalily officially reformed as Lily following the departure of Kean Cipriano (who now pursues his own musical career and managing indie label O/C Records). The band is now searching for a new vocalist, taking Cipriano's place. 4 months later, it was officially announced that former JBK member and Rak of Aegis musical cast member Joshua Bulot is the new leading vocalist of Lily.
- June 7 – Songs of Apo Hiking Society, Gary Valenciano, Kiana Valenciano, Ryan Cayabyab, Moira Dela Torre, Angela Ken, BGYO and Bini were announced to be part of The Lunar Codex—the first project to send film and music to the moon.
- July 8 – UMG Philippines formally launched Republic Records Philippines, the third imprint label after Def Jam Philippines and Island Records Philippines. Several artists from the UMG Philippines roster including Darren Espanto, Elha Nympha and Zack Tabudlo were joined the new label.
- July:
  - Kai Honasan formally announced her departure from indie-alternative band Autotelic, pursuing her resumption as a solo artist.
  - Coke Studio Philippines announced its 6th season with a lineup of 6 artists, namely: Bini, Arthur Nery, Adie, KZ Tandingan, Shanti Dope, and The Juans. Each artists will collaborate with 6 individual talented fans who submitted their entries via social media.
- September 5 – BGYO was announced and became the only Filipino act, alongside other 6 K-pop idols, to headline the first ever K-pop Halloween Concert in the Philippines—Hallyuween 2022.
- September 11 – BGYO and H&M Philippines announced the Philippines' first ever concert in a digital universe—BGYO Celestial Spaces: H&M Concert from the Virtual Universe—with a tagline, "where music meets style".
- September 18 – Khimo Gumatay, a 22-year-old singer from Makati, was hailed as the grand winner of Idol Philippines season 2.
- September 19 – It was announced by Ely Buendia that the Eraserheads will hold their upcoming reunion concert, entitled "Huling El Bimbo 2022", on December 22, 2022. It will be their first reunion concert since their "The Final Set" concert in 2009. Following the announcement, fans however, concerned about the band's and band members' past issues, including Marcus Adoro's abusive allegations.
- September 20 – Joshua Camacho Bulot was introduced as the newest vocalist of Lily, replacing Kean Cipriano.
- October 12 – Filipino singer-songwriter Adie was among the global rising music acts on Spotify's RADAR, according to Rolling Stone.
- November 4 – Following the release of BGYO's second album Be Us, the group delivered an extraordinary feat of having 2 albums and 32 tracks on iTunes Philippines Charts at the same time, the first Filipino act to do so.
- November 20 – Indie post-rock/math rock band tide/edit announced their disbandment after 11 years, with their final show held in Makati.
- November 25 – Moira Dela Torre officially signed with UMG Philippines label Republic Records Philippines.
- November:
  - Actress/singer Lea Salonga collaborates with acapella group Pentatonix for their version of Jose Mari Chan's iconic Christmas song "Christmas in Our Hearts", to be featured in Pentatonix's sixth album Holidays Around the World.
  - Indie alternative pop band Banna Harbera announced their disbandment, with their final show held on December 27 at SaGuijo, Makati.
- December
  - Kiara San Luis officially departed from Imago as the lead vocalist. Kharren Granada, known as a solo artist performing as Kurei, took over the leading vocals of the said band.
  - Zack Tabudlo was held as the Most Streaming Local Artist for Spotify Wrapped of 2022. Meanwhile, "Ikaw Lang", a song by pop-rock band Nobita, was hailed as the Most Streaming Local Track of 2022.

== Debuting acts ==
=== Bands ===
- 6ENSE
- ANAYA
- BLVCK ACE
- BOIZ
- Breē
- Calista
- Chelsea Alley
- Dilaw
- DIONE
- Flow Minister
- G22
- Hey June!
- Paper Satellites
- Party Pace
- Plan B
- Quaderno
- Sectionjuan
- SMS
- SunKissed Lola
- VXON
- YGIG

=== Solo artists ===
- Anji Salvacion
- Arthur Miguel
- Baet Alcantara
- Boy Graduate
- CHRSTN
- Daniel Paringit
- Denise Julia
- DENȲ
- dwta
- Jae K
- Jano
- Jay Garche
- Jelo The Weirdo
- JMara (of Morobeats)
- LEILA (Leila Manalac)
- Manila Luzon
- Marielle Belleza
- Marina Summers
- Markus
- Minty Fresh
- MRLD
- Noah Alejandre
- Relden
- Shanaia Gomez
- Sheki
- Silas
- Toni Panagu
- Valfer
- Waiian

== Reunion/Comebacks ==
- Chelsea Ronquillo
- Perkins (formerly Perkins Twins)
- O.C. Dawgs
- Rivermaya
- Run Dorothy
- Shamrock
- Agaw Agimat

== Disbanded ==
- JBK
- tide/edit
- Banna Harbera

== Released in 2022 ==
=== First quarter ===
==== January ====
Date	Single / Album	Artist(s)	Genre(s)	Label(s)	Ref.
1	Panahon	Hey June!	Pop rock	Warner Music Philippines	
1	Batugan	Flow G	Hip Hop/Rap	Ex Battalion Music Entertainment	
1	HATDOG	Zack Tabudlo (feat. James Reid)	Pop	Island Records Philippines (UMG Philippines)	
6	Someday	Jeremy G	Pop	Star Music	
7	Caleruega	Joshua Feliciano feat. Acapellago	Pop	Viva Records	
7	This Beat Will Save You	Guji Lorenzana	Pop	Vicor Records	
7	Zephanie	Zephanie	Alternative, Indie Pop	Star Music	
7	Reset	Ignatius Coloma (feat. Rotsanjani Mojica)	Alternative rock	Enterphil Entertainment Corporation; Ivory Music	
7	Your Special Day	Tank B Music	Hip Hop/Rap	Enterphil Entertainment Corporation; Ivory Music	
7	wala na!	Soulthrll	Hip Hop/Rap	Warner Music Philippines	
7	Strangers	The Adamant	Alternative	Warner Music Philippines	
7	Different Shade of Blue	Paolo Sandejas	Pop	Universal Records	
9	The Beast	VXON	P-Pop	Cornerstone Entertainment	
11	Entertain Me	Ylona Garcia	Pop	88rising Paradise Rising	
12	Kung Ako ang Pumiling Tapusin Ito	Sponge Cola	Pop rock, Alternative	Sony Music Philippines	
13	PSG	Al James	Hip Hop/Rap	Believe Music	
14	It's Okay Not To Be Okay	Angela Ken	Indie pop	Star Music	
14	Huling Mensahe	Bandang Lapis	Pop rock	Viva Records	
14	Bagong Yugto	Quest (feat. Elai)	Hip Hop/Rap	Warner Music Philippines	
14	Click	Lola Amour (feat. Leanne & Naara)	Rock	Warner Music Philippines	
14	New Love	Perkins	Pop	Warner Music Philippines	
15	Ang Wakas	Arthur Miguel	Pop	Warner Music Philippines	
15	Shout Out	1st.One	P-Pop	FirstOne Entertainment	
17	OBLIVION	Unique Salonga	Easy listening	O/C Records	
19	Pumila Ka	Maris Racal (feat. Raven)	Pop	Balcony Entertainment; Sony Music Philippines	
19	Kambing	Michael Bars	Hip Hop/Rap	Sony Music Philippines	
20	Kalapati	Jarlo Base	Indie pop	Sony Music Philippines	
21	Paano	Alexa Ilacad	Pop	Off the Record	
21	Everybody Hurts	Christian Bautista, Julie Anne San Jose	Pop	Universal Records	
21	Tell Me	Press Hit Play	P-Pop	Evolution Media	
24	Serve	Zae and Paul N Ballin	Hip Hop/Rap	Rawstarr Records	
26	Eh Ano	Abaddon	Hip Hop/Rap	Sony Music Philippines	
28	From The Sea (EP)	Morissette, Dave Lamar, From The Sea	Pop	Underdog Music PH, Stages Sessions	
28	Gigi De Lana	Gigi De Lana	Pop	Star Music	
28	Fantasy	Dia Mate	Pop	Island Records Philippines (UMG Philippines)	
28	La Luna	Pablo	Pinoy pop	Independent	
28	Para Sa'Yo (EP)	Noel Cabangon	Pop	Universal Records	

==== February ====
Date	Single / Album	Artist(s)	Genre(s)	Label(s)	Ref.
3	NVMD	Denise Julia	R&B/Soul	Independent	
4	Basic (EP)	Shanti Dope	Hip Hop/Rap	Universal Records	
4	I Guess That Was Goodbye	Lyn Lapid	Pop	UMG Philippines	
4	Losin' My Mind	Ethan Loukas	Pop	Blacksheep Records Manila	
4	Vivid	Ena Mori	Indie pop	Offshore Music	
6	Lilo	One Click Straight	Alternative	Island Records Philippines (UMG Philippines)	
9	Mag-ingat	Ben&Ben	Alternative folk	Sony Music Philippines	
11	Gusto Ko Nang Bumitaw – From "The Broken Marriage Vow"	Morissette	Indie Pop, OPM	Star Music	
11	Ayoko Lang	Angelina Cruz	Pop,	Universal Records	
11	Daydreams Vol. 1	Drive of Daydreams	Rock	O/C Records	
11	Iba	Zack Tabudlo (feat. Moira Dela Torre)	Pop	Island Records Philippines (UMG Philippines)	
11	Butanding	Mayonnaise	Pop rock	Sony Music Philippines	
11	Habangbuhay	Ebe Dancel	Pop	Widescope Entertainment	
11	maybe forever (EP)	Jeremy G	Pop	Star Music	
11	The Clash Season 4 Finalists Sing Originals (EP)	Various Artists	Pop	GMA Music	
11	Heartbeat on Me	Kiana V	R&B/Soul	Independent	
11	Tawag Mo	Piolo Pascual and KZ Tandingan	Pop	Star Music	
11	Kndmn	Meg Zurbito	Blues	Ivory Music	
14	ABKD	Alamat	P-Pop	Viva Records	
14	Race Car	Calista	P-Pop	Madhouse Music	
14	Honey Calm Down	Cheats	Alternative	Island Records Philippines (UMG Philippines)	
14	Underfined (EP)	Dello	Hip Hop/Rap	Independent	
16	Pagmamahal Mo Lang	O.C. Dawgs (feat. Flow G)	Hip Hop/Rap	Panty Droppaz League	
16	Babae	Ace Banzuelo	R&B/Soul	Sony Music Philippines	
16	Santigwar	Dwta	Pop	Sony Music Philippines	
16	Madali	Lola Amour and Al James	Pop	Warner Music Philippines	
17	360	Carissa (featuring Ely Buendia)	Pop	Tower of Doom Music	
18	Gusto Ko Nang Bumitaw (Band Version)	Morissette	Indie Pop, OPM	Star Music	
18	Habol	MC Einstein	Pop	Haftway House	
18	Lakas Ng Pinas	Alisson Shore	P-Pop	TikTok	
18	Kailangan ko ng...	jikamarie	R&B/Soul	Warner Music Philippines	
18	Paliwanag	Gloc-9 and Yeng Constantino	Hip Hop/Rap	Universal Records	
18	Barcode 2 (Album)	Pricetagg	Hip Hop/Rap	Rawstarr Records	
18	Puso	Nonoy Peña	Pop	Ivory Music	
18	iro	Relden	Pop	Tarsier Records	
18	call me when you wake up (Live session)	Tala	Pop	Universal Records	
18	Misteryo	Alexa Ilacad and KD Estrada	Pop	Star Music	
18	When I See You Again	Alexa Ilacad and KD Estrada	Pop	Star Music	
22	Paro Paro G The Album	DJ Sandy	Dance	Evolution Media	
23	Yugto	Any Name's Okay	Indie pop	Sony Music Philippines	
25	Bang!	G22	P-Pop	Cornerstone Entertainment	
25	The One	Leanne & Naara	Pop	Warner Music Philippines	

==== March ====
Date	Single / Album	Artist(s)	Genre(s)	Label(s)	Ref.
1	Lakbay	Def Jam Rekognize	Hip Hop/Rap	Def Jam Philippines (UMG Philippines)	
2	1530	Disktrack (feat. Romeo)	Hip Hop/Rap	Sony Music Philippines	
2	Sa Kabila Ng Lahat	Unit 406	Alternative	UMG Philippines	
4	woman (EP)	Vanya	Pop	Star Music	
4	At Kahit	Jose Carlito	Rock	Star Music	
4	Primera	Hero	Hip Hop/Rap	Universal Records	
4	You'll Be Safe Here	Adie	Indie pop	O/C Records	
4	Diskarte	Sectionjuan	Indie pop	Blacksheep Records Manila	
4	Sinta	Quaderno	Alternative	Enterphil Entertainment Corporation; Ivory Music	
4	Makina	Dan Gil and Marga Jayy	R&B/Soul	Warner Music Philippines	
4	Solo na Lobo	Midnasty	Hip Hop/Rap	Warner Music Philippines	
4	Eh Papaano	JRLDM (feat. jikamarie)	Hip Hop/Rap	Warner Music Philippines	
4	Hype One's (Album)	Nik Makino	Hip Hop/Rap	Independent	
4	Rosas	Nica Del Rosario (featuring Gab Pangilinan)	Singer-songwriter	FlipMusic	
6	Bahaghari	Dionela	R&B/Soul	UMG Philippines	
8	Kidlat	LITZ	P-Pop	Viva Records	
9	Paulit-Ulit	Chen	Pop	UMG Philippines	
11	Phoenix (Acoustic Version)	Morissette	Singer-Songwriter	Underdog Music PH	
11	11 (EP)	True Faith	Pop	Viva Records	
11	The Outsider	Lyn Lapid	Pop	UMG Philippines	
11	Naninigurado	huhsmile	Pop	UMG Philippines	
11	I'd Like To	SAB, Moophs	Indie pop	Tarsier Records	
11	Tag-araw	Sitti	Bossa nova	Widescope Entertainment	
16	LAHI	HBOM	Hip Hop/Rap	FFP Records, Sony Music Philippines	
18	Dalampasigan	Anji Salvacion	Pop	Star Music	
18	Alon	8 Ballin'	Hip Hop/Rap	Def Jam Philippines (UMG Philippines)	
18	Araw, Buwan, Taon, Dekada	6cyclemind	Rock	Sony Music Philippines	
18	STRESSES	of Mercury	R&B/Soul	Sony Music Philippines	
18	Liwanag	The Juans	Pop rock	Viva Records	
18	Panira	Flow Minister	Hip Hop/Rap	Viva Records	
18	Tulong	Bloodflowers	Blues	Enterphil Entertainment Corporation; Ivory Music	
18	I Can't Make You Love Me	Iona Gibbs	Easy listening	Curve Entertainment	
18	Eyes on You	Perkins	Pop	Warner Music Philippines	
18	Kaya	Paul Pablo	Pop	Warner Music Philippines	
18	Routine	Jolianne	R&B/Soul	Careless Music	
20	Live at the Den (EP)	One Click Straight	Alternative	Island Records Philippines	
21	Praning	Flow G	Hip Hop/Rap	Ex Battalion Music Entertainment	
22	Gitna (EP)	The Company	A capella, Pop	Star Music	
23	Maglakbay	Baet Alcantara	Alternative	Sony Music Philippines	
25	Bola Bola (Original Soundtrack) (EP)	BGYO, KD Estrada, Akira Morishita	Pop	Star Music	
25	Here We Go (EP)	4th Impact	P-Pop	Sony Music Philippines	
25	Pag-ibig Nga Naman	Kunns	R&B/Soul	Sony Music Philippines	
25	Asan Ka Na Ba?	Zack Tabudlo	Disco, Pop	Island Records Philippines	
25	Manila Magic	Jay R and Mica Javier	Pop, R&B/Soul	Homeworkz Entertainment Services	
25	Epic	7 Shots of Wisdom, Kristyles and Southeast Cartel	Hip Hop/Rap	Def Jam Philippines	
25	Pilak	Gloc-9	Hip Hop/Rap	Universal Records	
25	Running	Sharlene San Pedro	Pop	Yellow Room Music; Sony Music Philippines	
25	Panaginip	Geca Morales	Pop	Ivory Music	
25	Sadly Falling	Hannah Precillas	Pop	GMA Music	
25	Babangon Muli	Mark Carpio	Pop	Viva Records	
25	SentiMo (EP)	JEM	Pop	Soupstar Music	
25	Di Nga Pala Tayo	CHNDTR	Pop	UMG Philippines	
25	Obra (EP)	Keiko Necesario	Indie pop	Warner Music Philippines	
25	Sensitive Sun	Party Pace	Rock, Electronic	Music Colony Records	
30	Bawal Sumuko Dito	Flict G	Hip Hop/Rap	Sony Music Philippines	
31	Mahal Kong Pilipinas	JMara	Hip Hop/Rap	Def Jam Philippines (UMG Philippines)	
31	Drop 1 (EP)	Juan Karlos	Pop rock	Island Records Philippines (UMG Philippines)	

=== Second quarter ===
==== April ====
Date	Single / Album	Artist(s)	Genre(s)	Label(s)	Ref.
1	No Way Man	MNL48	P-Pop	HalloHallo Entertainment; Universal Records	
1	Up!	Bini and BGYO	P-Pop	Star Music	
1	P.S.	VXON	P-Pop	Cornerstone Entertainment	
1	Mananatili	Cup of Joe	Pop rock	Viva Records	
1	Umiibig Pa Rin	Sam Cruz	Pop	Universal Records	
1	Pabalik Sa'yo	Darren Espanto	Pop	UMG Philippines	
1	Maligayang Pagkukunwari	Mrld	Pop	O/C Records	
1	Manila Meltdown (EP)	Paper Satellites	Alternative, Indie	Lilystars Records	
3	Kung Ikaw Ang Kasama (Sparkle Summer Song)	Zephanie	Pop	GMA Playlist	
6	U Got Me	ALLMO$T	R&B/Soul	Viva Records	
7	Totoo	Nobita	Pop	Sony Music Philippines	
7	Bling Bling	DIONE	P-Pop	FirstOne Entertainment	
8	Blah Blah	KAIA	P-Pop	Sony Music Philippines	
8	La Bulaquena	Orange and Lemons	Kundiman, Rock	Lilystars Records	
8	Winning	KZ Tandingan	Pop	Tarsier Records	
8	Want Love	Aloura	Pop	Warner Music Philippines	
8	Bizarre Love Triangle	B.O.U.	Easy listening	Curve Entertainment	
8	Bayan Kang Magiliw	Dulce, Renz Verano and Richard Reynoso (ft. Ima Castro, Beverly Salviejo)	OPM	Independent	
8	Fallin' 4 U (Dream Version)	Daydream	P-Pop	Rebel Records; Warner Music Philippines	
9	this is God's land	Aidan Bernales	Pop	Independent	
13	Sa Panaginip Na Lang	Alamat	P-Pop	Viva Records	
13	Reyna ng Sablay	Hazel Faith	Pop	Sony Music Philippines	
13	LOVE	Plan B	Hip Hop/Rap	Sony Music Philippines	
14	Kita Kita Sa Huli	Zelijah	Hip Hop/Rap	Sony Music Philippines	
15	Dalawampu't Dalawang Oo (2200)	Ez Mil	Hip Hop/Rap	FFP Records Management	
15	The Outsider	Lyn Lapid	Pop	Republic Records, UMG Philippines	
15	Just Because	Debonair District, Lara Maigue	Jazz	Warner Music Philippines	
16	Alas Dos	Josue	Hip-hop	Radkidz	
18	I L Y	Ogie Alcasid and Regine Velasquez (ft. DJ MOD)	Pop	Star Music	
20	Buhangin	Acel	Alternative folk	Sony Music Philippines	
20	Discovery	Any Name's Okay	Alternative folk	Sony Music Philippines	
20	Bullet Sun	Ex Battalion	Hip Hop/Rap	Ex Battalion Music Entertainment	
22	Best Time	BGYO	P-Pop	Star Music	
22	Dagdag Na Alaala	Angela Ken	Pop	Star Music	
22	Let Me Be Me	Krystal Brimner	Pop	Star Music	
22	Babalik	Elha Nympha	Pop	UMG Philippines	
22	Kundiman	Rob Deniel	Pop	Vicor Music	
22	3:33	Lesha, Careless	Pop	Careless Music	
22	Kung Pwede Lang	The Knobs	Pop	Universal Records	
22	Maya	Shanti Dope	Hip Hop/Rap	Universal Records	
22	Manifest	Lo Ki	Alternative hip hop	DRP Records	
22	Don't Stop	The Sundown	Rock	Island Records Philippines	
22	Bago	Quest	R&B/Soul	Warner Music Philippines	
22	aking buwan (EP)	Jikamarie	R&B/Soul	Warner Music Philippines	
22	Dazed (Book Version)	Kiana V	Neo soul	Independent	
23	Ginaganahan	Clien of ALLMO$T	R&B/Soul	Viva Records	
27	Quaranfling	Ken Chan	Pop	GMA Music	
29	Pit A Pat	Bini	P-Pop	Star Music	
29	Kasingkasing Dalampasigan (EP)	Anji Salvacion	Indie pop	Star Music	
29	Ikuwento Natin (EP)	Kiss N' Tell	Rock	Star Music	
29	As You Are	Zack Tabudlo	Pop	Island Records Philippines (UMG Philippines)	
29	Ikaw Lang Ang Mahal	Mark Carpio	Pop	Viva Records	
29	Simpatiko	Mojofly (feat. Monty Macalino)	Alternative rock	Yellow Room Music; Sony Music Philippines	
29	Permanente (EP)	Quest	R&B/Soul	Warner Music Philippines	
29	3019	Dilaw	Indie rock	Warner Music Philippines	
29	Last Thing I'd Do	Denise Barbacena	Pop	GMA Playlist	
29	Tales From Tha Crypt Vol. 1 (EP)	Bawal Clan	Hip Hop/Rap	Homonym/Hyphen Distribution	
30	Tamales	Conscious and the Goodness	Hip Hop/Rap	Hyphen Music	

==== May ====
Date	Single / Album	Artist(s)	Genre(s)	Label(s)	Ref.
1	Paninindigan Kita	Ben&Ben	Pop, Alternative	Sony Music Philippines	
1	Wala	J.Mara	Hip Hop/Rap	Def Jam Philippines	
4	CHANGIN' Vol. 2	of Mercury	Electronic	Sony Music Philippines	
6	Hotel Room	Kyle Echarri, Markus, and Moophs	R&B	Tarsier Records	
6	Porket	JBK	Pop	Warner Music Philippines	
6	Palms of Two Sinners	Kemrie Barcenas	Pop	Universal Records	
7	Casino	Rivermaya	Alternative	Sony Music Philippines	
8	Isip at Kamalayan	Ang Bandang Shirley	Pop rock	Wide Eyed Records Manila	
10	Dekada '70 (demo)	Zild	Alternative	Independent	
11	Mahika	Adie and Janine Berdin	Indie pop	O/C Records	
13	Kumpisal	Gloc-9 (feat. Skusta Clee)	Hip Hop/Rap	Universal Records	
13	Phases: In Fragments	Jensen Gomez	Alternative	Off the Record (UMG Philippines)	
13	LARO	Janine Teñoso	Pop	Viva Records	
13	Kupido	Arthur Miguel	Pop	Warner Music Philippines	
13	Kumpas	Moira Dela Torre	Pop	Star Music	
17	Verified	Lian Kyla	Pop	Star Music	
20	No Goodbyes (EP)	Sandwich	Rock	PolyEast Records	
20	Babalik	G22	P-Pop	Cornerstone Entertainment	
20	Reign	allen&elle	Pop	Tarsier Records	
20	MISS USED (EP)	Relden	Pop	Tarsier Records	
20	Nova	Young Cocoa	Hip Hop/Rap	Offmute	
20	Ngiti	Matthaios	Hip Hop/Rap	Midas Records	
20	Oh, Jo	Magnus Haven	Indie pop	Blacksheep Records Manila	
20	to have (EP)	Kyl Aries	R&B/Soul	Independent	
20	Own Advice (EP)	Boy Graduate	Hip Hop/Rap	Warner Music Philippines	
20	Kwarto	Matt Lozano	Pop	GMA Music	
25	Laman ng Panaginip	Sponge Cola	Pop, Alternative	Sony Music Philippines	
25	Pananadalian	EJ de Perio	Pop	Sony Music Philippines	
27	Run to Me (Original Soundtrack) (EP)	Alexa Ilacad, KD Estrada	Indie pop	Star Music	
27	Blind	Elise Huang	Pop	Island Records Philippines (UMG Philippines)	
27	Di Papakawalan	Maris Racal	Pop	Sony Music Philippines	
27	Wag Hayaan	647	Alternative	Sony Music Philippines	
27	Hinto Galaw	MRLD	Pop	O/C Records	
27	Alam Ko Naman	Frizzle Anne	Indie pop	O/C Records	
27	FANCY	8 Ballin'	Hip Hop/Rap	Def Jam Philippines (UMG Philippines)	
27	Kamusta	Shanti Dope (feat. Flow G)	Hip Hop/Rap	Universal Records	
27	Vibin	Ylona Garcia	Pop	88rising	
27	Ikaw Ang	Sam Concepcion (featuring Yeng Constantino, Yuridope, Moophs)	Pop	Tarsier Records	
28	Bulan	Felip	P-Pop	Independent	
30	Eroplano	Jom of ALLMO$T	R&B/Soul	Independent	
30	MUSK	Aidan Bernales	Rap	Independent	
31	Still in Love	Eyedress	Indie rock	Lex Records	

==== June ====
Date	Single / Album	Artist(s)	Genre(s)	Label(s)	Ref.
1	R.B.M.S.	GFAB (featuring Alisson Shore)	R&B/Soul	Good Boy Music	
1	Di Inakala	Paul Pablo	Pop	Warner Music Philippines	
1	Alapaap	Baet Alcantara	Pop	Sony Music Philippines	
2	i won't be too far	ABY	Pop	Sony Music Philippines	
3	Last Reply...	Keifer Sanchez	Pop	Star Music	
3	She @ 20 (EP)	SAB	Pop	Star Music	
3	Nag-iisa Lang (for Baby Sylvio)	Angeline Quinto	Lullaby	Star Music	
3	HELP	Markus, Aman Segar	R&B/Soul	Tarsier Records	
3	Turn Up	Just Hush (featuring Lo Ki)	R&B/Soul	DRP Records, Viva Records	
3	Baka Naman	Marielle Belleza	Pop	Vicor Music	
3	Bitaw	Daniel Paringit	Pop	UMG Philippines	
3	Ikaw	Jonn Walter	Pop	Ant Hill Studios	
3	Habol V.2	MC Einstein	Pop	Haftway House	
3	A Collection of Skies	Mica Caldito	Pop	Warner Music Philippines	
3	Mamayapa	Chantal Salonga	Pop	Warner Music Philippines	
3	Rosas (Extended Version)	Nica Del Rosario (featuring Gab Pangilinan, Matthew Chang and Tinig Tumitindig Grand Choir)	Pop	FlipMusic	
3	Sinasambit	Anna Aquino	Pop	PolyEast Records	
3	SOS	Ena Mori	Indie pop	Offshore Music	
3	Trippin' Out	Deuces	Indie pop	PolyEast Records	
3	Sana Masaya Ka Na	Eevee	Alternative	Ivory Music and Video	
4	Organic	Wonggoys	Visayan Pop rock	22 Tango Music	
6	Walls and Spaces (EP)	Yolanda Moon	Indie rock, Electronic	Independent	
9	Heaven	Darren Espanto, Calum Scott	Pop	UMG Philippines	
10	Isa Pa Nga	Tres Marias	Rock	Star Music	
10	Fine	Karylle	Easy listening	Independent	
10	Estranghero	Cup of Joe	Pop rock	Viva Records	
10	Dito	Hero, Matthaios	R&B/Soul	Universal Records	
10	Gaga	Flow G, Skusta Clee, Yuridope	Hip Hop/Rap	Independent	
10	WTF I Actually Wrote These Songs (EP)	Janine Berdin	Pop	Star Music	
10	Lustre	The Cokeheads	Pop	Enterphil / Ivory Music & Video	
10	Elise, Live (EP)	Elise Huang	Pop	Island Records Philippines	
11	Ate Sandali	Maris Racal	Pop	Sony Music Philippines	
11	Hara	Raven	Pop	Sony Music Philippines	
15	Your Glory is Greater	Gloryfall	Christian music	Waterwalk Records	
17	My Miracle	XOXO	Pop	GMA Music	
17	Huli	Arthur Miguel	Pop	Warner Music Philippines	
17	Pagtingin	Leann Ganzon	Pop	Ivory Music & Video	
17	Dito Ka Lang	Patrick Quiroz	Pop	Cornerstone Entertainment	
17	G.G.D.	DAZE (featuring Nik Makino)	Hip Hop/Rap	Off the Record (UMG Philippines)	
17	Hindi Na Tama 'To	Kuatro Kantos	Alternative	Sony Music Philippines	
17	MINE	CHNDTR	Pop rock	UMG Philippines	
17	Still	Miguel Odron	Pop	Star Music	
18	Ibulong Mo Na Sa Hangin	Six Part Invention	Pop rock	Star Music	
18	Manifest	Issa Lo Ki	Hip Hop/Rap	Viva Records	
21	Sumpa	Valfer	P-Pop	Viva Records	
22	Ilusyon ni Juan	Jano	Hip Hop/Rap	Def Jam Philippines	
23	Langyang Pag-Ibig	Ben&Ben	Alternative folk	Sony Music Philippines	
24	Lagi	Bini	P-Pop	Star Music	
24	Panata	JM Yosures	Pop	Star Music	
24	Anghel	Zack Tabudlo	Pop	Island Records Philippines; UMG Philippines	
24	Hayaan Lang	Jay Garche	Pop	Universal Records	
24	PS	Vanillo	Pop	Enterphil / Ivory Music & Video	
24	Lugar Kung S'an	Hey June!	Pop	Warner Music Philippines	
24	Kaloy	Dilaw	Indie rock, Alternative	Warner Music Philippines	
24	KISLAP	Jikamarie	R&B/Soul	Warner Music Philippines	
26	Bitaw	Daryl Ong	Pop	Viva Records	
27	Closer	Belle Mariano	Pop	ABS-CBN Film Productions	
27	Winter Archives 2020 (EP)	Jom of ALLMO$T	R&B/Soul	Independent	
29	Langit	Dionela	Pop	UMG Philippines	
30	I Wish You Were Gay	Kio Priest	Pop	Independent	
30	kunwari	Juan Karlos	Pop	Island Records Philippines; UMG Philippines	
30	AIGHT	R!S (featuring TEEN)	Hip Hop/Rap	Def Jam Philippines; UMG Philippines	

=== Third quarter ===
==== July ====
Date	Single / Album	Artist(s)	Genre(s)	Label(s)	Ref.
1	Kaulayaw	Psalms David	Pop	GMA Music	
1	Huwag Mo Kong Iwan	Ogie Alcasid	Pop	Star Music	
1	Sindi	Gracenote	Pop	Universal Records	
1	Bestfriend	Jom of ALLMO$T (featuring Michael Pacquiao)	R&B/Soul	Viva Records	
1	Galit	Jae K (featuring Yuridope)	R&B/Soul	WAYBETTR, Viva Records	
1	Girl Gang	R Rules	P-Pop	UMG Philippines	
1	Kulang Pa Ba	JP Noche	P-Pop	PolyEast Records	
1	Gusto Ko Chubby Ka	Tubero	Metal	Tower of Doom Music	
1	Juxtaposition	Splendio Tritus	Rock	KDR Music House	
1	Nissan	Midnasty	Hip Hop/Rap	Warner Music Philippines	
1	Hiraya	Keen	Hip Hop/Rap	Warner Music Philippines	
2	Indoor Swimming Pool	Bugoy na Koykoy	Hip Hop/Rap	2 Joints Enterprise	
5	K: Para Sa Bayan Kong Mahal	Kuh Ledesma	OPM, Kundiman	Independent	
6	Did I Let You Go	Jon Guelas, Vivoree	Pop	Star Music	
7	Limbo	Any Name's Okay	Indie pop	Sony Music Philippines	
7	DAMHIN	Plan B	Hip Hop/Rap	Sony Music Philippines	
7	Say U Love Me	Alamat	P-Pop	Viva Records	
8	Kung Alam Mo Lang	Bandang Lapis	Pop rock	Viva Records	
8	Akin Ka Na Lang (A Family Affair OST)	Gigi De Lana and the Gigi Vibes	Indie pop	Star Music	
8	Buhok	Gloc-9, Liezel	Hip Hop/Rap	Universal Records	
8	Hauntingly	Silas	Pop rock	Vicor Music	
8	Kahit Na, Kahit Pa	Belle Mariano	Pop	ABS-CBN Film Productions	
8	All Out of Love	Renz Robosa	Pop	Ivory Music and Video	
8	Safe With Me	Kim de Leon	Pop	GMA Playlist	
8	Fool	Eric Ejercito	Pop	Viva Records	
8	Mahiyain	DENȲ	Pop	WAYBETTR, Viva Records	
8	Ngiti ng Buwan	Hazel Faith	Pop	Sony Music Philippines	
8	Life Changes	Stephen Ku	Pop	Warner Music Philippines	
8	EYEZ ON YOU (WHAT IT DO BABY!)	J. WALTR	Hip Hop/Rap	Warner Music Philippines	
8	Margarita	TREV	Hip Hop/Rap	Warner Music Philippines	
8	Paruparo	Sugarcane	Alternative	Warner Music Philippines	
9	Alak Pa	Skusta Clee (featuring Yuridope)	Hip Hop/Rap	Panty Droppaz League	
13	Tumitigil Ang Mundo	BGYO	P-Pop	Star Music	
13	Walang Himala	Ace Banzuelo	Pop	Sony Music Philippines	
15	Power (Miss Universe Philippines 2022)	Morissette	Pop	Empire.PH Music	
15	Hot Maria Clara	Sanya Lopez	Pop	GMA Music	
15	Tahan	Mark Oblea	Pop	Universal Records	
15	Patawad	Kristina Academia	Pop	Soupstar Music	
15	Tado	Marlo Mortel	Pop	PolyEast Records	
15	Faith	Fern.	Pop	Island Records Philippines (UMG Philippines)	
15	Dahil Ikaw	Faith Cuneta	Adult contemporary	Curve Entertainment	
15	Affable Dork	Clara Benin	Indie pop	Offmute	
15	Demons	Lesha	Indie pop	Careless Music	
15	Fade Away	JRLDM, Chyno With a Why?	Hip Hop/Rap	Warner Music Philippines	
17	7	Flict G (featuring Kjah and Kial)	Hip Hop/Rap	Sony Music Philippines	
20	Hahayaan	One Click Straight	Alternative	Island Records Philippines (UMG Philippines)	
20	OUT OF YOU	of Mercury	R&B/Soul	Sony Music Philippines	
20	PaRaLang	HBOM	Hip Hop/Rap	Sony Music Philippines	
20	Beep	VVS Collective (featuring R!S of 8 Ballin')	Hip Hop/Rap	Def Jam Philippines (UMG Philippines)	
20	Bakit Ka Aalis	Shamrock	Alternative	Independent (via Ditto Music)	
21	Mapayapa	Baet Alcantara	Alternative	Sony Music Philippines	
22	Tapat Sa'yo	4th Impact	P-Pop	Sony Music Philippines	
22	Paano Uusad	Nobita	Pop rock	Sony Music Philippines	
22	Akala Maling Akala	Angela Ken	Pop	Star Music	
22	Yakap	Zack Tabudlo	Pop	Republic Records Philippines (UMG Philippines)	
22	MINE (Cheesy Version)	CHNDTR	Pop	Republic Records Philippines (UMG Philippines)	
22	cherry soda	Tala	Pop	Universal Records	
22	Disinasadya	Ferdinand Aragon	Pop	Warner Music Philippines	
22	Sakali	Meg Zurbito	Pop	Ivory Music and Video	
22	Last Dance	The Sundown	Rock	Island Records Philippines (UMG Philippines)	
22	Seryoso	SOS	Indie pop	Bavarian Records	
22	Panandalian / Good for a Time	Benjamin Kheng featuring Bea Lorenzo	Pop	Sony Music Entertainment	
22	Yahweh	Victory Worship	Praise and Worship	Victory	
23	Pira-piraso	Mariane Osabel	Pop	GMA Music	
23	If I Can See You When I Pass Away	Aidan Bernales	Pop	Singer/Songwriter	Independent
25	You Won't See Me Crying	Elise Huang	Island Records Philippines (UMG Philippines)		
27	Kapit	Cheats	Island Records Philippines (UMG Philippines)	Pop, Alternative	
27	Horizon	Cydel, Marc Fichel	Pop	Republic Records Philippines (UMG Philippines)	
27	Duality	Ez Mil	Hip Hop/Rap	FFP Records, Virgin Records, UMG	
29	Lyric and Beat (Original Soundtrack)	Various Artists (Darren Espanto, Jeremy G, Angela Ken, Jonathan Manalo, Kyle Echarri, AC Bonifacio, Andrea Brillantes, Seth Fedelin, Sheena Belarmino, Awra Briguela)	Indie pop	Star Music	
29	Para Sa'yo	Shanaia Gomez	Indie pop	StarPop	
29	Kundi Ikaw	Seth Fedelin	Pop	StarPop	
29	Hanggang Dito na Lang	Arra San Agustin	Pop	GMA Playlist	
29	I Wanna Know	BOIZ	P-Pop	Viva Records	
29	Langga	Wilbert Ross	Pop	Viva Records	
29	Mamahalin Kita	Joslin	Pop	Viva Records	
29	Maid in Malacañang (Original Soundtrack)	Various artists (Marion Aunor, Daryl Ong, Jehramae)	Pop	Viva Records	
29	Maria Clara	Magnus Haven	Pop	Blacksheep Records Manila	
29	When We Were Young	Stereotype	Pop	Ivory Music and Video	
29	Praising Hours	Esang de Torres	P-Pop	PolyEast Records	
29	Showtime	8 Ballin'	Hip Hop/Rap	Def Jam Philippines (UMG Philippines)	
29	Hulaan	Unit 406	Rock	Republic Records Philippines (UMG Philippines)	
29	Don't Blame the Wild One!	Ena Mori	Indie pop	Offshore Music	
29	Sigurado	Aly Remulla	Indie pop	O/C Records	
29	Bahala Na	Kenaniah	Indie pop	O/C Records	
29	fairytale	Aloura	Pop	Warner Music Philippines	
29	Thunder (Lustbass Remix)	Muri	Pop	Warner Music Philippines	
30	Sinag	Arthur Nery (featuring Samantha Benwick)	Pop	Coke Studio Philippines, Viva Records	
30	Day Onez	Shanti Dope (featuring Aeron Alcoran a.k.a. Rookie)	Hip Hop/Rap	Coke Studio Philippines, Universal Records	
31	Equinox	CRWN, Six the Northstar	R&B/Soul	Pool Records	

==== August ====
Date	Single / Album	Artist(s)	Genre(s)	Label(s)	Ref.
1	Undangon Ta Ni	Morissette	P-Pop	Underdog Music PH	
3	Bula	Suzara (featuring Sly Kane)	Pop	Sony Music Philippines	
5	Di Ka Akin	Gary Valenciano, Julie Anne San Jose	Pop	Universal Records	
5	Tampo	Julia Daniel	Pop	YR Music, Sony Music Philippines	
5	Takipsilim	Modern Day Dream	Pop rock	Blacksheep Records Manila	
5	Aninag	Quaderno	Alternative	Ivory Music and Video	
5	Ford Valencia (EP)	Ford Valencia	Pop	Star Pop	
5	Wasabi?	Flamingos and Eggs	Pop	Warner Music Philippines	
5	Chismis	Ex Battalion	Hip Hop/Rap	Ex Battalion Music	
5	Di Na Tama	Owfuck	Hip Hop/Rap	Music Colony Records, Warner Music Philippines	
5	lofi beats to study ur bible to	Good Guys Go to Heaven	Hip Hop/Rap	Tarsier Records	
5	Was This Love? (Langyang Pag-ibig English Version)	Ben&Ben	Alternative folk	Independent	
5	sober / a quiet life	Aidan Bernales	Pop/Rock	Independent	
6	Love Yourself	Bini (featuring Miller Villo and Ciena Marie Operario)	P-Pop	Coke Studio Philippines, Star Music	
6	Simple Lang	ANAYA	Pop rock	Ivory Music and Video	
8	Mukhang Pera Sa'yo	Debonair District	Jazz	Warner Music Philippines	
10	Kala Ko Tayo	EJ Del Perio	Pop	Sony Music Philippines	
10	King of Kings (Tagalog Version)	Gloryfall	Christian	Waterwalk Records	
11	Isang Anghel	Zild	Rock	Island Records Philippines (UMG Philippines)	
11	Twin Flame	Peaceful Gemini (featuring NueVo)	Hip Hop/Rap	Sony Music Philippines	
11	La Lluvia	REN (featuring Plan B and Sur Henyo)	Hip Hop/Rap	Sony Music Philippines	
12	Tricks	Shanti Dope	Hip Hop/Rap	Universal Records	
12	0916	Because	R&B/Soul	Viva Records	
12	All Ur Love	Kyl Aries	R&B/Soul	Independent	
12	Kabado	Adie	Indie pop	O/C Records	
12	Baliw	ASTER	Rock	Off the Record (UMG Philippines)	
12	Happy You Stayed	SAB	Pop	Tarsier Records	
14	Patuloy Lang Ang Lipad	BGYO	Indie pop	Star Music	
16	GOOD TO ME	Nathan Huang, Darla Baltazar	Christian	Waterwalk Records	
17	Looking Back (Live at the PETA Theater)	Lola Amour	Rock	Warner Music Philippines	
17	4 ACES	HBOM	Hip Hop/Rap	Sony Music Philippines	
17	Leaving Home (EP)	Any Name's Okay	Pop	Sony Music Philippines	
18	Laman Ng Panaginip (Acoustic ver.)	Sponge Cola	Pop rock	Sony Music Philippines	
19	Infinity	Quest (featuring John Roa)	Pop	Warner Music Philippines	
19	can't get enough	Jason Dhakal	R&B/Soul	Warner Music Philippines	
19	Pasilip	Soulthrll (featuring Kiyo)	Hip Hop/Rap	Warner Music Philippines	
19	Kulet	Fateeha	Hip Hop/Rap	Def Jam Philippines (UMG Philippines)	
19	Nararararamdaman	Blaster	Alternative, Rock	Island Records Philippines (UMG Philippines)	
19	Close to You	Cydel	Pop	Republic Records Philippines (UMG Philippines)	
19	To The Stars (EP)	ASTER	Rock	Off the Record (UMG Philippines)	
19	Hawak Mo Na	Sandiwa	Pop rock	Ivory Music and Video	
20	Tinatanggi	Adie (featuring Chrstn)	Pop	Coke Studio Philippines, O/C Records	
20	Ang Forever Ko'y Ikaw	Mcoy Fundales	Pop	GMA Music	
23	ILY ILY	Alamat feat. Lyca Gairanod	P-Pop	Viva Records	
24	Eroplano	Baet Alcantara	Alternative	Sony Music Philippines	
24	ENOUGH	of Mercury	R&B/Soul	Sony Music Philippines	
24	Leron	Arthur Miguel (featuring Trisha Macapagal)	Pop	Warner Music Philippines	
26	Turn Up	1st.One	P-pop	Warner Music Philippines	
26	The Ones We Once Loved	Ben&Ben	Pop	Sony Music Philippines	
26	Jopay	LEILA	Pop	YR Music, Sony Music Philippines	
26	Kasama Ka (EP)	Various artists (Denize Castillo, Eunice Janine, Jaycen Cruz, Kimpoy Rivera, Tiara Shaye)	Pop	Kumu Music	
26	Paraya	Vilmark Viray	Pop	GMA Music	
26	Di Umiinom	Gloc-9, Hero	Hip Hop/Rap	Universal Records	
26	superficial energy	Denise Julia	R&B/Soul	Independent	
26	Kalimutan	dia maté	R&B/Soul	Island Records Philippines (UMG Philippines)	
26	Intravenuos	Sepia Times	Indie pop	Island Records Philippines (UMG Philippines)	
26	Krystal Brimner (EP)	Krystal Brimner	Pop	Star Pop	
27	Diskarte	The Juans	Pop rock	Coke Studio Philippines, Viva Records	
31	Pahinga	Elha Nympha	Pop	Republic Records Philippines (UMG Philippines)	
31	3rd Eye	Lesha	Pop	Careless	
31	SHAWTY	Donnalyn Bartolome	Pop	Independent	
31	Breaking Bad	Michael Bars	Hip Hop/Rap	Sony Music Philippines	
31	Byahe	Kunns	Hip Hop/Rap	Sony Music Philippines	

==== September ====
Date	Single / Album	Artist(s)	Genre(s)	Label(s)	Ref.
2	WYAT (Where You At)	SB19	P-Pop	Sony Music Philippines	
2	FIYAAH	VXON	P-Pop	Cornerstone Entertainment	
2	in another life	Zion Aguirre	Pop	Tarsier Records	
2	Ikaw Pa Rin	MRLD	Pop	O/C Records	
2	Next Week	Moonstar88	Pop rock	Soupstar Music, ADA Philippines	
3	Sabi-Sabi	KZ Tandingan (featuring Pau Dimaranan)	Pop	Coke Studio Philippines	
3	Until I Reach the Sun – Vol. 1	The Ridleys	Alternative	Independent	
8	Ayoko Pa	Alex Bruce	Hip Hop/Rap	Sony Music Philippines	
9	Tayuman	Kean Cipriano	Pop rock	O/C Records	
9	Saan Tayo Nawala	Eevee	Alternative	Ivory Music and Video	
9	Analogies on Love	Aviators	Alternative	Tarsier Records	
9	Legit	Hero (featuring Jekkpot)	Hip Hop/Rap	Universal Records	
9	Forever, The Night (EP)	Sin Santos	Hip Hop/Rap	Warner Music Philippines	
9	Beautiful Kind	Kat Agarrado	R&B/Soul	Warner Music Philippines	
9	I Just Wanna	Keen	R&B/Soul	Warner Music Philippines	
9	Luv Is	VXON (featuring Zephanie)	P-Pop	GMA Music	
9	Bagong Kanlungan	EJ de Perio	Pop	Sony Music Philippines	
9	Hintay / Bola	Madeline	Pop	YR Music, Sony Music Philippines	
9	LDR (Love. Dreams. Reality)	Geca Morales	Pop	Enterphil Entertainment Corporation	
12	Palibot libot	Rico Blanco	Alternative pop	Sony Music Philippines	
14	Ako Nalang	Jason Marvin	Pop	Sony Music Philippines	
14	Tayo Parin Talaga	Raven	Pop	Sony Music Philippines	
14	The Lunchtime Special (EP)	Lola Amour	Rock	Warner Music Philippines	
16	Pero	Zack Tabudlo	R&B/Soul	Republic Records Philippines (UMG Philippines)	
16	Duwag	Zild	Alternative	Island Records Philippines (UMG Philippines)	
16	Future Lover	Janno Gibbs	Pop	Viva Records	
16	Isa Isa Lang Kase	Wilbert Ross	Pop	Viva Records	
16	Sana	Aubrey Caraan	Pop	Vicor Music	
16	Hardest Thing	Jon Guelas	Pop	Tarsier Records	
16	Mataray	Matthaios	Hip Hop/Rap	Midas Records	
16	Chill	Rice Lucido	Indie pop	O/C Records	
17	For J	Markus	Pop	Tarsier Records	
17	Positibo	Nik Makino, Jimmy Pablo	Hip Hop/Rap	Eastbound	
21	O Kay Ganda	Blaster	Alternative	Island Records Philippines (UMG Philippines)	
21	Balang Araw	Plan B	Hip Hop/Rap	Sony Music Philippines	
22	If You Only Knew	Acel	Pop	Sony Music Philippines	
23	Pagbigyang Muli	Morissette, Jonathan Manalo	Indie pop	Star Music	
23	Defy	G22	P-Pop	Cornerstone Entertainment	
23	Hotel Runs	Nameless Kids	Pop	Tarsier Records	
23	Sinta	Rob Deniel	Pop	Vicor Music	
23	Soy-Sauced Lovers (EP)	Flamingos and Eggs	Pop	Warner Music Philippines	
23	Just for Today	Reanne Borela	Pop	Warner Music Philippines	
23	Bago Ka Umuwi	Suddenly Monday	Pop	YR Music, Sony Music Philippines	
23	Angat Buhay Tayo	Nica Del Rosario (feat. Jeli Mateo, Justine Peña, Matthew Chang)	Pop	FlipMusic	
23	Mahal Mo Parin Ako	Unit 406	Pop	Republic Records Philippines (UMG Philippines)	
23	Hebishram	Gloc-9, Hero, Ramdiss, Bishnu	Hip Hop/Rap	Independent	
23	Araw	Juan Karlos	Pop rock	Island Records Philippines (UMG Philippines)	
23	Hook Up	ALLMO$T	R&B/Soul	Viva Records	
23	Asa	John Roa	R&B/Soul	Viva Records	
28	Musika	Dionela	Pop	Republic Records Philippines (UMG Philippines)	
28	CHANGIN' Vol. 3 (EP)	Of Mercury	Pop	Sony Music Philippines	
28	Pasahili (para sa hindi pinili)	Arthur Miguel	Pop	Warner Music Philippines	
29	u & i	James Reid	Pop	Careless	
29	Feel Good (Album)	Bini	Pop	Star Music	
29	MAMA	Loir	Pop	Sony Music Philippines	
30	Dalawa	KAIA	P-Pop	Sony Music Philippines	
30	Sambit	Press Hit Play	P-Pop	Evolution Media	
30	Tahan	Night Over Alaska	Pop	Sony Music Philippines	
30	Phases	Aloura	Pop	Warner Music Philippines	
30	Panulay	Midnasty (featuring Batang Indio, JRLDM)	Hip Hop/Rap	Warner Music Philippines	
30	Day Ones	VVS Collective (featuring Akosi Dogie)	Hip Hop/Rap	Def Jam Philippines (UMG Philippines)	
30	MRT	One Click Straight	Alternative	Island Records Philippines (UMG Philippines)	
30	Papatungo	No Lore	Alternative	Off the Record, UMG Philippines	

=== Fourth quarter ===
==== October ====
Date	Single / Album	Artist(s)	Genre(s)	Label(s)	Ref.
1	Feel Good	Bini	P-Pop	Star Music	
5	Anino	Suzara	Pop	Sony Music Philippines	
5	Malumanay	Jarlo Base	Pop	Sony Music Philippines	
5	Di Ako Lasing	Jom and ALLMO$T (featuring Ayuks)	R&B/Soul	Viva Records	
6	Antipara (EP)	Krayola	Alternative	Enterphil Entertainment Corporation	
7	Dati-Dati	Sarah Geronimo	Pop	Viva Records	
7	I Drop	Bayani Agbayani	Pop	Viva Records	
7	Te Amo	Jeankiley (featuring Krissha Viaje, Ella Cruz)	Pop	Viva Records	
7	Sa Ulan	Nobita	Pop	Sony Music Philippines	
7	Pagod Na	Janine Berdin, Sam Mangubat	Pop	Star Music	
7	Detached	Lyn Lapid	Pop	Republic Records, UMG Philippines	
7	No Rush	Justin Vasquez	R&B/Soul	Republic Records, UMG Philippines	
7	Tara G!	The Juans	Pop rock	Star Music	
7	Hands to Heaven	I Belong to the Zoo	Indie pop	Universal Records	
7	RESBAK	Gloc-9 (featuring Shanti Dope, CLR, Omar Baliw, Pricetagg)	Hip Hop/Rap	Universal Records	
7	Tus	Keen	Hip Hop/Rap	Warner Music Philippines	
8	My Kosmik Island Disk	Blaster	Alternative, Rock	Island Records, UMG Philippines	
12	dahan-dahan	Lola Amour	Pop rock	Warner Music Philippines	
12	Namimiss	CHNDTR	Pop	Republic Records, UMG Philippines	
13	LOVESCENE	James Reid	Pop	Careless	
13	Big Ape (EP)	Young Blood Neet	Hip Hop/Rap	2k Playaz, Ghost Worldwide	
14	Kung Wala Na Ako	Kyle Raphael	Pop	Viva Records	
14	Marupok	Ataska	Pop	Viva Records	
14	Born To Cry (EP)	Kanishia	Pop	Star Pop	
14	Clear to Me	Leah Halili	Pop	Independent	
14	Take Me Back	Zack Tabudlo (featuring Yonnyboii)	Pop	Republic Records, UMG Philippines	
14	Duda	Zild	Alternative	Island Records, UMG Philippines	
14	Shot Puno	Juan Karlos	Rock	Island Records, UMG Philippines	
14	ur man	Jason Dhakal	R&B/Soul	Warner Music Philippines	
14	COY (Cuz of You)	Kyla, Brian McKnight Jr.	Neo soul	Tarsier Records	
16	Para Sa'Kin	Chelsea Ronquillo	Pop	O/C Records	
19	Ulan	Baet Alcantara	Pop	Sony Music Philippines	
20	Magnet	BGYO	P-Pop, dance-pop, techno	Star Music	
21	Puede Ba	Maymay Entrata	Pop	Star Music	
21	Liquid Courage	Paolo Sandejas	Pop	Universal Records	
21	Unan	Leanne & Naara	Pop	Warner Music Philippines	
21	Don't Have Time	Calista	P-Pop	Madhouse Music	
21	Forever Young	Press Hit Play	P-Pop	Evolution Media	
21	Sino Mali	Hey June!	Pop rock	Island Records, UMG Philippines	
21	Another Day	dia maté	Pop	Island Records, UMG Philippines	
21	Ripped Jeans	Jon Cuelas	Pop	Tarsier Records	
21	Memories	Komiko	Pop	Warner Music Philippines	
21	Sweet Symphony	H3rizon	R&B/Soul	Warner Music Philippines	
21	Home	Juicebox	Indie rock	Warner Music Philippines	
21	Me & You	Eva Smalls, Ian Sndrz	EDM	Sora Music Group, Warner Music Philippines	
21	Nauseous	Party Pace	Rock	Music Colony Records, Warner Music Philippines	
21	Aalis Ka Ba?	I Belong to the Zoo	Alternative	Independent	
21	Curtains	Southern Lights	Alternative	YR Music, Sony Music Philippines	
22	Phases: In Full	Jensen Gomez	Alternative	Off the Record, UMG Philippines	
23	Love Is Us This Christmas	Various artists	Christmas	GMA Music	
23	Iingatan Kita	Agaw Agimat	Alternative	MMC Records	
25	the sun is you	Jikamarie	R&B/Soul	Warner Music Philippines	
26	Fool	Dom Guyot	R&B/Soul	Republic Records, UMG Philippines	
26	Here in my Arms	The Vowels They Orbit	Indie pop	Sony Music Philippines	
28	Pasulong (mini album)	Alamat	P-Pop	Viva Records	
28	Cuore	Sarah Geronimo	Pop	Viva Records	
28	By My Side	Zack Tabudlo (featuring Tiara Andini)	Pop	Republic Records, UMG Philippines	
28	Awake	Shanaia Gomez	Pop	StarPop	
28	Colour Everywhere	Morissette	Pop	Universal Records	
28	Pasilyo	SunKissed Lola	Pop	Independent (c/o Ditto Music)	
28	Bawal	Nicole Asensio	Pop	Warner Music Philippines	
28	Pasahili	Arthur Miguel	Pop	Warner Music Philippines	
28	Dosesn't Mean Anything	Marga Jayy	R&B/Soul	Warner Music Philippines	
28	Pinalabe	Midnasty	Hip Hop/Rap	Warner Music Philippines	
28	Medisina	Zild	Alternative	Island Records, UMG Philippines	
28	3 A.M.	The Ransom Collective	Indie pop	Mustard Music	

==== November ====
Date	Single / Album	Artist(s)	Genre(s)	Label(s)	Ref.
3	Be Us	BGYO	Pop	Star Music	
4	Alay	Silent Sanctuary	Pop	Independent (c/o Ditto Music)	
4	153	Dionela	Pop	Republic Records, UMG Philippines	
4	merry xmas ibblock kita	Huhsmile	Pop	Republic Records, UMG Philippines	
4	Gumamela	Jireh Lim	Pop	Warner Music Philippines	
4	When You Say My Name	Jeli Mateo	Pop	FlipMusic	
4	Divine	Marina Summers, Moophs	Pop, Dance, LGBT	Tarsier Records	
4	Kaibigan Lang	Carissa	Pop Rock	Tower of Doom Music	
4	Love & Euphony (EP)	Kyl Aries	R&B/Soul	Independent	
7	Para	YARA	P-Pop	APT Entertainment	
9	Tandemic	Suzara	Pop	Sony Music Philippines	
9	Leo Rising (EP)	Peaceful Gemini	Hip Hop/Rap	Sony Music Philippines	
9	Bumitaw	HBOM (featuring Damsa, Jack Ladymasta)	Hip Hop/Rap	Sony Music Philippines	
10	Glorious	Gloryfall	Christian	Waterwalk Records	
11	Tayo Ang Ligaya ng Isa't Isa	Various artists	Christmas	ABS-CBN	
11	Pasko Na Nga Giliw Ko	Ianna dela Torre	Christmas	Star Music	
11	Pag-ibig Ko'y Panalo	Kakai Bautista	Pop	Star Music	
11	Sabik	Mark Carpio	Pop	Viva Records	
11	Bigkas (EP)	Zion Aguirre	Pop	Tarsier Records	
11	Rainbow	Invictus	Pop	Enterphil Entertainment Corporation	
11	Bittersweet	Jess Connelly	R&B/Soul	Independent	
11	Changin'	Of Mercury	R&B/Soul	Sony Music Philippines	
11	Show U	Zelijah	Hip Hop/Rap	Sony Music Philippines	
11	Rex Lapis (Wangsheng Funeral Remix)	Dello (featuring Ms. Yumi)	Hip Hop/Rap	Sony Music Philippines	
11	Anino	Oh, Flamingo!	Alternative	Sony Music Philippines	
11	houseplants	Cheats	Rock	Island Records, UMG Philippines	
11	Against the Light of Day	The Breed	Rock	Warner Music Philippines	
11	DYCEMO	Quest	Hip Hop/Rap	Warner Music Philippines	
16	Committed	Quest	Hip Hop/Rap	Warner Music Philippines	
16	Matimtiman	Munimuni	Alternative folk	Sony Music Philippines	
16	May Sasabihin Lang	Raven	Pop	Sony Music Philippines	
17	Imagine More	Morissette	Pop	Walt Disney Records, UMG Philippines (distribution)	
18	Dahil Sa Mahal Kita	1st.One	P-Pop, Ballad	Warner Music Philippines	
18	Everyday	Aloura	Pop	Warner Music Philippines	
18	My Confessions	Rocky Sandoval	R&B/Soul	Warner Music Philippines	
18	Uhaw	Dilaw	Alternative	Warner Music Philippines	
18	Dahan-Dahan	One Click Straight	Alternative	Island Records, UMG Philippines	
18	Tulak	Lily	Pop rock	Lx2 Music	
18	Days	KD Estrada	Indie pop	Star Music	
18	Ngayong Pasko	The Knobs	Christmas, Pop rock	Universal Records	
18	Kulang	Ace Banzuelo	Pop	Sony Music Philippines	
18	Hindi Kita Kailangan	Rienne	Pop	Off the Record, UMG Philippines	
18	Balang Araw	Nica Del Rosario	Pop	FlipMusic	
18	Akin Ka Lang	Frizzle Anne, John Roa	Pop	O/C Records	
18	Beautiful	Clien and ALLMO$T (featuring Lipip)	R&B/Soul	Viva Records	
19	Maitim na Mahika	John Roa (featuring Yuridope, Blaster)	Hip Hop/Rap	Viva Records	
22	Belief	July XIV	Pop rock	Independent	
25	Intertwine	Over October (featuring The Ridleys)	Alternative	Island Records, UMG Philippines	
25	Shaba Shaba	YGIG	P-Pop	Universal Records	
25	Close 2 U	Bey	Pop	Universal Records	
25	An Inconvenient Love (Original Soundtrack) (EP)	Various artists	Pop	ABS-CBN Film Productions	
25	Dear	Ben&Ben	Pop	Sony Music Philippines	
25	3:15	Syd Hartha (featuring Kiyo)	R&B/Soul	Sony Music Philippines	
25	Pinadama	Zack Tabudlo	R&B/Soul	Republic Records, UMG Philippines	
25	Mood Swing (Par Edition)	JRLDM	Hip Hop/Rap	Music Colony Records, Warner Music Philippines	
25	Butterfly Gang	Soulthrll	Hip Hop/Rap	Warner Music Philippines	
25	Haranahin	Mayor & Co	Indie pop	HandpickedWorld Music	
25	Outlines (EP)	No Lore	Alternative	Off the Record, UMG Philippines	
27	Overcurrent	Gabba	Rock	A Spur of the Moment Project	
29	Deus Ex Machina	July XIV	Pop rock	Independent	
30	Rosas	Baet Alcantara	Pop	Sony Music Philippines	
30	Crossroads	ABY	Pop	Sony Music Philippines	
30	VV XXXMAS	VVS Collective	Christmas, Hip Hop/Rap	Def Jam Recordings, UMG Philippines	

==== December ====
Date	Single / Album	Artist(s)	Genre(s)	Label(s)	Ref.
1	Hit Me	DJ Loonyo	Pop	Universal Records	
1	City Girl	Shanti Dope (featuring HELLMERRY)	Hip Hop/Rap	Universal Records	
1	Gabay at Tanglaw	Various	Christmas	SMNI	
1	GAIN	Jason Marvin	Pop	Sony Music Philippines	
1	Tumatakbong Oras	Oh, Flamingo!	Alternative	Sony Music Philippines	
1	Salawahan	Oh, Flamingo!	Alternative	Sony Music Philippines	
2	Christmas Starts When the Bers Begin (EP)	The Itchyworms	Christmas, Pop Rock	Sony Music Philippines	
2	Pag-Paasa Ang Pasko	Tank B Music	Christmas, Alternative	Enterphil Entertainment Corporation	
2	Drag Den	Manila Luzon	Dance Pop, LGBT	Warner Music Philippines	
2	Numb	Boy Graduate	Pop	Warner Music Philippines	
2	Nahuhulog Na Sa'yo	Noah Alejandre	Pop	Warner Music Philippines	
2	Pasko sa Atin	Debonair District	Christmas, Jazz	Warner Music Philippines	
2	Malay Mo	Hero, Ramdiss	Hip Hop/Rap	Universal Records	
3	Salamat Nalang	Isabel Laohoo	Pop	Independent (c/o Ditto Music)	
8	Unang Pasko	Jason Marvin	Christmas	Sony Music Philippines	
9	Gusto Ko Nang Bumitaw (Brian Cua Club Remix)	Morissette, Brian Cua	Pop	Star Music	
9	'Di Mo Na Ako Kailangan	The Juans	Pop rock	Viva Records	
9	Manila	Jason Dhakal	R&B/Soul	Warner Music Philippines	
9	Letters	Muri	Pop	Warner Music Philippines	
12	Nyebe	SB19	P-Pop	Sony Music Philippines	
14	Hometown	Sponge Cola	Pop rock	Sony Music Philippines	
16	Tayo ang Ligaya ng Isa't Isa (Extended Version)	Various artists	Christmas	ABS-CBN	
16	Inferno (EP)	Jace Roque	Pop	Independent (c/o Ditto Music)	
16	Unan (Acoustic)	Leanne & Naara	Indie pop	Warner Music Philippines	
16	Uhaw (Tayong Lahat)	Dilaw	Alternative	Warner Music Philippines	
16	Kusgan	Midnasty	Hip Hop/Rap	Warner Music Philippines	
17	XTC	Jae K	Hip Hop/Rap	WAYBETTR, Viva Records	
19	6oodBoy	6ENSE	P-Pop	B.C. Entertainment	
20	SUD: Live at the Cozy Cove	Sud	Alternative	Warner Music Philippines	
20	Idol	Ex Battalion	Hip Hop/Rap	Ex Battalion Music	
21	Tell Me	Sheki	R&B/Soul	Vernalossom	
23	Christmas Party	SB19	Pop	Sony Music Philippines	
23	Magasin	Nobita	Pop rock	Sony Music Philippines	
23	12:34	Because	R&B/Soul	Viva Records	
28	Patawad, Paalam, Salamat	Quest	R&B/Soul	Warner Music Philippines	
29	Don't Wait Up	Kio Priest, Minty Fresh	Funk, LGBT	Independent	
30	Sansinukob, Salamat	Sarah Geronimo	Pop	Viva Records	
30	Ang Huling El Bimbo	Ace Banzuelo	Pop	Sony Music Philippines	
30	SUPERPROXY (Version 2K22)	Alex Bruce, Of Mercury, Sofia Ines	Pop	Sony Music Philippines	

== Concerts and music festivals ==
Most of the shows this year were supposed to be held in 2020, but postponed due to the COVID-19 pandemic. Some concerts may be held in mid-late 2022 or postponed in 2023 depending on safety conditions related to the ongoing coronavirus.

=== Local artists ===
Date(s)	Artist(s)	Venue	City	Event / Tour	Note(s)	Ref(s)
March 5	Gigi De Lana	Newport Performing Arts Theater	Pasay	DOMINATION: A Gigi de Lana And The Gigi Vibes Concert	First live concert held in 2022. Aired also via live streaming on April 23, 2022, through KTX.ph	
March 26	December Avenue, Shanti Dope, Gloc-9, AJ Raval, Michael Pangilinan, Jacky Chang, Missing Filemon, Sephy Francisco	Cebu City Sports Center	Cebu City	Arat na Cebu!	—N/a	
April 2	Gloc-9 and Shanti Dope (with JKris, Loir and Hero)	Newport Performing Arts Theater	Pasay	Rapsody	—N/a	
April 10	Various (incl. This Band, Nina, Luke Mejares, South Border, Shamrock, Mocha Uson, Mocha Girls, SexBomb New-Gen, Jason Fernandez, Vivian Velez, Boobsie Wonderland, Arnell Tamayo, Wendell Ramos, Jimmy Bondoc, Banat By, Glydel Mercado, Jay Manalo)	Ermita, Manila		Isigaw Mo, Isko!: A Grand Rally Concert for Isko Moreno	—N/a	
April 23	SB19	Smart Araneta Coliseum	Quezon City	Dunkin Presents SB19 Live in Araneta Coliseum	—N/a	
April 23	Lions and Acrobats, She's Only Sixteen	Saguijo Bar	Makati	Red Ninja Year 13	—N/a	
April 23	Red Ollero	Teatrino, Promenade Mall, Greenhills	San Juan	Red Ollero: Finally (first leg)	First stand-up comedy concert since COVID-19 pandemic.	
April 23	Adie	Ayala Malls Solenad	Santa Rosa, Laguna	ALive! Concert Series	—N/a	
April 23	Zack Tabudlo	Market! Market!	Taguig	ALive! Concert Series	—N/a	
April 24	Zack Tabudlo, Over October	Ayala Malls Manila Bay	Parañaque	ALive!: Live at The Garden	—N/a	
April 24	Arthur Nery	Ayala Malls Solenad	Santa Rosa, Laguna	ALive! Concert Series	—N/a	
April 26	Calista (with AC Bonifacio, Elmo Magalona, Yeng Constantino, Darren Espanto, Andrea Brillantes and Ken San Jose)	Smart Araneta Coliseum	Quezon City	Vax to Normal Concert	—N/a	
April 29	Ez Mil	New Frontier Theater	Quezon City	Panalo: Homecoming Tour 2022	Originally supposed to be held at the Smart Araneta Coliseum prior to changing venue.	
April 30	Basil Valdez and Jamie Rivera	Newport Performing Arts Theater	Pasay	Love and Light	—N/a	
May 1	Zild, Keiko Necesario	Ayala Malls Manila Bay	Parañaque	ALive!: Live at The Garden	—N/a	
May 6	Ez Mil	Albay Astrodome	Legazpi	Panalo: Homecoming Tour 2022	—N/a	
May 6	Red Ollero	Teatrino, Promenade Mall, Greenhills	San Juan	Red Ollero: Finally (second leg)	—N/a	
May 7	The Koolpals podcast hosts (GB Labrador, James Caraan and Nonong Ballinan), Comedy Manila artists	Music Museum, Greenhills	San Juan	The Koolpals: Live at the Music Museum	—N/a	
May 8	Leanne & Naara, Basically Saturday Night	Ayala Malls Manila Bay	Parañaque	ALive!: Live at The Garden	—N/a	
May 8	Arthur Nery	Fairview Terraces	Quezon City	ALive! Concert Series	—N/a	
May 13	Arthur Nery	Ayala Malls Cloverleaf	Quezon City	ALive! Concert Series	—N/a	
May 13	Adie	Harbor Point, Subic Freeport	Zambales	ALive! Concert Series	—N/a	
May 13	Ez Mil	CAP Convention Center	Baguio	Panalo: Homecoming Tour 2022	—N/a	
May 14	Sud, Lola Amour	Ayala Malls Manila Bay	Parañaque	ALive!: Live at The Garden	—N/a	
May 14	Jon Santos (with Gian Magdangal, Alisah Bonaobra and OJ Mariano)	Newport Performing Arts Theater	Pasay	LiveScreaming	—N/a	
May 15	Ez Mil	Subic Freeport	Zambales	Panalo: Homecoming Tour 2022	—N/a	
May 21	Arthur Nery	Alabang Town Center	Muntinlupa	ALive! Concert Series	—N/a	
May 24	Nadine Lustre	Market! Market!	Taguig	ALive! Concert Series	—N/a	
May 27	Alex Calleja	Music Museum, Greenhills	San Juan	Alex Calleja: May Nanalo Na!	—N/a	
May 28	Arthur Nery	Ayala Malls Feliz	Marikina	ALive! Concert Series	—N/a	
June 4	Arthur Nery	Marquee Mall	Angeles City, Pampanga	ALive! Concert Series	—N/a	
June 4	Ez Mil	SMX Convention Center – SM Lanang Premier	Davao City	Panalo: Homecoming Tour 2022	Concert originally scheduled on May 1, but moved due to uncertain reasons.	
June 11	Anne Curtis	Newport Performing Arts Theater	Pasay	Luv-Anne	Aired via live streaming through KTX.ph and Vivamax	
June 11	Rico Blanco, Ebe Dancel, Zild, Never the Strangers, Maris Racal, Raven	Music Museum, Greenhills	San Juan	Balcony Entertainment: Live	—N/a	
June 11	Marco Sison	Teatrino, Promenade Mall, Greenhills	San Juan	An 80's Saturdate with Marco Sison	—N/a	
June 17–18	Sharon Cuneta and Regine Velasquez	Marriott Grand Ballroom, Resorts World Manila	Pasay	Iconic	—N/a	
June 18	Red Ollero	Samsung Performing Arts Theater, Circuit Makati	Makati	Red Ollero: Finally (final leg)	—N/a	
June 25	Martin Nievera	The Theatre, Solaire Resort & Casino	Parañaque	Live Again!: The Best of the Concert King	—N/a	
June 26	Andrew E., Chad Borja, Dulce, Florante, Freddie Aguilar, Ice Seguerra, Isay Alvarez, Jed Madela, Jimmy Bondoc, Martin Nievera, Moymoy Palaboy, Robert Sena, Philippine Philharmonic Orchestra	Quirino Grandstand	Manila	Salamat, PRRD!: A Thanksgiving Concert	—N/a	
July 2	Arthur Nery	New Frontier Theater	Quezon City	Arthur Nery: Live at the New Frontier Theater	—N/a	
July 10	Various artists	The Theatre, Solaire Resort & Casino	Parañaque	Wish Date 3	Organized by Wish 107.5 and KDR Music House.	
July 23	Kim Chiu, Carlo Aquino, Charlie Dizon, Andrea Brillantes, Maymay Entrata, Donny Pangilinan, Belle Mariano, KD Estrada, Alexa Ilacad, BGYO, Janine Berdin, AC Bonifacio, Lian Kyla, Angela Ken, Kyle Echarri, Gigi de Lana, Eric Nicolas and Shanaia Gomez	Newport Performing Arts Theater in Resorts World Manila	Pasay City	Star Magic 30th Anniversary Tour: Beyond The Stars	Originally, SAB was part of the Manila leg of the tour but wasn't able to join.	
July 30	Lola Amour	Ayala Malls Circuit	Makati	Fallen Concert Tour	With special guests Clara Benin and Leanne & Naara.	
August 1	Philippine Philharmonic Orchestra (with Isay Alvarez, Robert Seña, Bituin Escalante, The Nightingales, and Bo Serrudo)	Strike Gymnasium	Bacoor, Cavite	PPO Concert at Bacoor City, Cavite	—N/a	
August 6	Arthur Nery	Harbor Point, Subic Freeport	Zambales	ALive! Concert Series	—N/a	
August 6	Maris Racal, Maymay Entrata, Edward Barber, Zanjoe Marudo, Kim Chiu, Carlo Aquino, Charlie Dizon, Andrea Brillantes, Donny Pangilinan, Belle Mariano, KD Estrada, Alexa Ilacad, Janine Berdin, AC Bonifacio, SAB, Lian Kyla, Angela Ken, Kyle Echarri, Gigi de Lana and Eric Nicolas	Kings Theatre in Brooklyn	New York City, United States	Star Magic 30th Anniversary Tour: Beyond The Stars	Originally, BGYO was part of the US leg of the tour but wasn't able to join.	
August 7	Zack Tabudlo	Venice Grand Canal Mall, McKinley Hill	Taguig	Z Marks the Spot	With special guest Johnny Orlando	
August 7	SB19, Parokya ni Edgar, Janina Vela, Alodia Gosiengfiao, Yow x Awi x CLR, KAIA, Adie, Sud	Mall of Asia Arena	Pasay	Acer Day 2022	Sarah Geronimo, originally part of the lineup, was absent from the event.	
August 12	Maris Racal, Maymay Entrata, Edward Barber, Zanjoe Marudo, Kim Chiu, Carlo Aquino, Charlie Dizon, Andrea Brillantes, Donny Pangilinan, Belle Mariano, KD Estrada, Alexa Ilacad, Janine Berdin, AC Bonifacio, SAB, Lian Kyla, Angela Ken, Kyle Echarri, Gigi de Lana and Eric Nicolas	The Warfield Theatre in San Francisco	California, United States	Star Magic 30th Anniversary Tour: Beyond The Stars	Originally, BGYO was part of the US leg of the tour but wasn't able to join.	
August 13	Mayonnaise, MOJOFLY, Sharlene San Pedro, 647, Julia Daniel, KuatroKantos, LEILA, Madeline, Night Over Alaska, Southern Lights, Suddenly Monday	Alabang Town Center	Muntinlupa	YR Music 9th Anniversary Concert	—N/a	
August 14	Maris Racal, Maymay Entrata, Edward Barber, Zanjoe Marudo, Kim Chiu, Carlo Aquino, Charlie Dizon, Andrea Brillantes, Donny Pangilinan, Belle Mariano, KD Estrada, Alexa Ilacad, Janine Berdin, AC Bonifacio, SAB, Lian Kyla, Angela Ken, Kyle Echarri, Gigi de Lana and Eric Nicolas	The Saban Theatre in Los Angeles	California, United States	Star Magic 30th Anniversary Tour: Beyond The Stars	Originally, BGYO was part of the US leg of the tour but wasn't able to join.	
August 25	Various artists from KJC Music	Hotel Lucky Chinatown	Manila	SMNI Music Festival	Aired via live streaming through YouTube.	
August 26	Chad Kinis, Lassy, MC Muah (with special guests Vice Ganda, Zeinab Harake, and others)	New Frontier Theater	Quezon City	Beks 2 Beks 2 Beks: Beks Battalion Concert	—N/a	
August 26–27	Nonoy Zuñiga, Rey Valera, Marco Sison, Hajji Alejandro, Pops Fernandez	Newport Performing Arts Theater	Pasay	Four Kings and a Queen	—N/a	
August 28	Various artists	Marikina Sports Center	Marikina	Cycle of Life: Wish 107.5 8th Anniversary Concert	First face-to-face event of Wish 107.5 since the pandemic.	
September 2	Various artists	Samsung Hall – SM Aura Premier	Taguig	Kumu Is 4 U: Birthday Concert	Aired via live streaming through Kumu	
September 5	BGYO	General Santos City Oval Plaza	General Santos	TNT Saya Fest sa Tuna Festival	The event was part of a month long celebration of General Santos' 24th Tuna Festival and marks as BGYO's first-ever Mindanao show.	
September 10	Lola Amour	Ayala Malls Capitol Central	Bacolod	Fallen Concert Tour	With special guests Dizzy on Swings and &ND.	
September 11	Rico Blanco	Smart Araneta Coliseum	Quezon City	Rico Blanco: Live at the Smart Araneta Coliseum	With special guests Ebe Dancel and Zild	
September 11	Sud	Teacher's Village	Quezon City	SUD Anniversary Show	With special guest Toneejay.	
September 16	Tala, Jikamarie, Denise Julia	The Island – The Palace Manila, Uptown Bonifacio	Taguig	Jameson Connects: Manila	In partnership with Magic 89.9.	
September 17	SB19	Smart Araneta Coliseum	Quezon City	WYAT: Where You At? Tour	—N/a	
September 24	Side A (original and new band members)	Newport Performing Arts Theater	Pasay	Then and Now: Redux 360 Side A Experience	First live audience concert of the "Side A Redux" series after two consecutive virtual concerts in 2021. With special guest Clara Benin.	
September 25	Lola Amour	Centrio	Cagayan de Oro	Fallen Concert Tour	With special guests Soulthrll and Neuvmbr.	
September 30	This Band	Vista Mall Las Piñas	Las Piñas	This Five!: This Band 5th Anniversary Concert	With special guests Magnus Haven, Mayonnaise, Autotelic, CHNDTR and others.	
October 1	Lola Amour	Glorietta	Makati	Fallen Concert Tour	With special guests Clara Benin, Leanne & Naara and Arthur Miguel.	
October 1	SB19	Waterfront Cebu City Hotel & Casino	Cebu	WYAT: Where You At? Tour	—N/a	
October 1	Ben&Ben	MacEwan Hall – University of Calgary in Calgary	Alberta, Canada	Ben&Ben Live On Tour 2022	—N/a	
October 2	Ben&Ben	Midway Music Hall in Edmonton	Alberta, Canada	Ben&Ben Live On Tour 2022	—N/a	
October 6	Ben&Ben	Enso Event Centre in Vancouver	British Columbia, Canada	Ben&Ben Live On Tour 2022	—N/a	
October 7	Various artists	Newport Performing Arts Theater	Pasay	Yugyuganation 2	With special participation of Mike Hanopol and Sampaguita	
October 8	Christian Bautista	Samsung Performing Arts Center, Circuit Makati	Makati	The Way You Look at Me: Christian Bautista 20th Anniversary Concert	—N/a	
October 8	SB19	SMX Convention Center, SM City Clark	Pampanga	WYAT: Where You At? Tour	—N/a	
October 9	BGYO, Alamat, 1st.One, Dione and SMS	Spaceport Grounds, Enchanted Kingdom	Laguna	EK's 27th Pre-Anniversary Concert:P-pop Day	—N/a	
October 9–10	Ben&Ben	The Opera House in Toronto	Ontario, Canada	Ben&Ben Live On Tour 2022	Originally scheduled for October 9, but was extended for one more day	
October 11	BGYO with Pam Swing	Zamboanga Grandstand	Zamboanga City	TNT Saya Fest sa Zamboanga Hermosa	—N/a	
October 15	Bamboo, SMS, Victoria's Way and Kingsmen	Spaceport Grounds, Enchanted Kingdom	Laguna	EK's 27th Anniversary Concert	—N/a	
October 15	SB19	SMX Convention Center, SM Lanang Premier	Davao City	WYAT: Where You At? Tour	—N/a	
October 15	Ice Seguerra	The Theatre, Solaire Resort & Casino	Parañaque	Becoming Ice: 35th Anniversary Concert	With special guests Gary Valenciano and Chito Miranda.	
October 15	Various artists	Newport Performing Arts Theater	Pasay	Mr. Music: The Hits of Jonathan Manalo	Originally, certain artists, such as singer-songwriter SAB and singer Fana were part of the original lineup, but pulled out due to various reasons. Some other artists such as Janine Berdin and Idol Philippines Season 2 finalists Bryan Chong, Ann Raniel, PJ Fabia and Nisha Bedaña replaced them.	
October 14–16	South Border, Neocolours	Various locations	United States	Tuloy Pa Rin Kahit Kailan Tour	With special guests Duncan Ramos, Jireh Lim, Cedric Escobar and Deney	
October 15	Lola Amour	Ayala Center Cebu	Cebu City	Fallen Concert Tour	With special guest Paul Pablo.	
October 16	Lola Amour	Ayala Malls Central Bloc	Cebu City	Fallen Concert Tour	With special guest Lourdes.	
October 21	Ben&Ben	Palladium Times Square in New York City	New York, United States	Ben&Ben Live On Tour 2022	—N/a	
October 22	Ben&Ben	Warehouse 2101 in Washington, D.C.	District of Columbia, United States	Ben&Ben Live On Tour 2022	—N/a	
October 22	Lola Amour	U.P. Town Center	Quezon City	Fallen Concert Tour	With special guests Leanne & Naara, Arthur Miguel, and Jason Dhakal.	
October 23	Lola Amour	Abreeza	Davao City	Fallen Concert Tour	With special guests 3 am, and Jo3m Manzanares.	
October 23	The Juans	Smart Araneta Coliseum	Quezon City	The Juans Live in Araneta	—N/a	
October 23	Ben&Ben	Fox Theater in San Francisco	California, United States	Ben&Ben Live On Tour 2022	—N/a	
October 26	Ben&Ben	North Shore Center for the Performing Arts in Chicago	Illinois, United States	Ben&Ben Live On Tour 2022	—N/a	
October 28	Ogie Alcasid, Ian Veneracion	Newport Performing Arts Theater	Pasay	KilaboTitos 2022	—N/a	
October 28	Ben&Ben	The Fonda Theatre in Los Angeles	California, United States	Ben&Ben Live On Tour 2022	—N/a	
October 31	Zild (with special guests One Click Straight, Ena Mori and Megumi Acorda)	Whitespace Manila	Makati	Gabi ng Paniki: Halloween Night + Zild's Medisina Album Launch	Also featuring a one-night reunion performance of Barbie's Cradle. Originally scheduled on October 29 but was moved due to weather concerns brought by Tropical Storm Nalgae (Paeng).	
November 5	Gary Valenciano, Martin Nievera, Ogie Alcasid, Zsa Zsa Padilla, Regine Velasquez-Alcasid, KZ Tandingan, Kim Chiu, Darren Espanto, Iñigo Pascual, BGYO, Bini, AC Bonifacio, Kyle Echarri, Donny Pangilinan, Belle Mariano, Bamboo, Ez Mil, Lovi Poe, Jane De Leon, Janella Salvador, Vaughn Mugol, Jessica Sanchez, Francisco Martin, Cheesa Laureta, Elha Nympha, Dessa, Rizza Navales, Brian Puspos and Bailey May.	Orleans Arena in Las Vegas	Nevada, United States	ASAP Natin 'To Las Vegas	Originally, Angeline Quinto was planned to be part of the show, but was pulled out and replaced by Iñigo Pascual.	
November 5	Lola Amour	Harbor Point	SBMA	Fallen Concert Tour	With special guests Sud and Aerolites.	
November 6	December Avenue, Nyoy Volante, Mark Michael Garcia, Peniel, Kimberly Baluzo, Plethora and The Bradz	The Theatre, Solaire Resort & Casino	Parañaque	Wish Date 4: My Sweet Lady	Organized by Wish 107.5 and KDR Music House.	
November 12	Lola Amour	Marquee Mall	Angeles City, Pampanga	Fallen Concert Tour	With special guest Rangel.	
November 18	Klarisse De Guzman	New Frontier Theater	Quezon City	Her Time	—N/a	
November 18	Gloc-9, Shanti Dope	Various locations	Toronto, Canada	Rapsada sa Canada Tour	—N/a	
November 18	Ebe Dancel	Central Park, Filinvest City	Muntinlupa	Come Together for Christmas	—N/a	
November 19	Martin Nievera	The Theatre, Solaire Resort & Casino	Parañaque	M4D: Martin 4 Decades	—N/a	
November 20	tide/edit	Justin Bella Alonte Photography Studio, Chino Roces Ave.	Makati	ALL OUR DAYS: A tide/edit Special Showcase	Final show of the band.	
November 25	Gloc-9, Shanti Dope	Various locations	Winnipeg, Canada	Rapsada sa Canada Tour	—N/a	
November 25	Rivermaya	Central Park, Filinvest City	Muntinlupa	Come Together for Christmas	—N/a	
November 26	Acel Bisa, Aia de Leon, Barbie Almalbis, Hannah Romawac, Kitchie Nadal and Lougee Basabas	The Theatre, Solaire Resort & Casino	Parañaque	Gabi Na Naman: TANAW	A collaborated concert featuring former vocalists of female-lead Pinoy rock bands (Moonstar88, Imago, Barbie's Cradle, MOJOFLY and SessiOnroad).	
November 26	Julie Anne San Jose, Rayver Cruz	Newport Performing Arts Theater	Pasay	Julieverse	—N/a	
November 26	Zack Tabudlo	Bonifacio High Street	Taguig	High Street Serenade at 5th	—N/a	
November 26	Autotelic (with special guests December Avenue and Ang Bandang Shirley)	123 Block, Mandala Park	Mandaluyong	Isang Dekadang Autotelic	—N/a	
November 29	Kean Cipriano, Adie, Unique Salonga	New Frontier Theater	Quezon City	Pulso: Kean x Adie x Unique	—N/a	
November 30	BGYO, Johnoy Danao, Janine Teñoso	Eton Centris Open Grounds	Quezon City	Wish Upon A Sun	A free concert presented by Sun Life Philippines in partnership with Wish 107.5 for the campaign "Sun Life's Partner for Life".	
December 2	Lily	Music Museum	San Juan	Magbalik: The Comeback Concert	—N/a	
December 2	Lola Amour	Central Park, Filinvest City	Muntinlupa	Come Together for Christmas	—N/a	
December 2	Juan Karlos Labajo, BGYO, 8Track, Dustine Mayores, Amanda Zamora	Pinaglabanan Shrine open parking grounds	San Juan City	Kapaskuhan sa Makabagong San Juan: Free Concert	A free concert as part of the activity "Kapaskuhan sa Makabagong San Juan".	
December 2–3	Kuh Ledesma, Odette Quesada, Fe Delos Reyes	Newport Performing Arts Theater	Pasay	All About Love	—N/a	
December 3	Various artists	BGC Arts Center	Taguig	Paskong Pinoy Playlist Music Festival: A Christmas Tribute to 2022 PPMF Awardees	The show will honor Philippine music artists Jose Mari Chan, Pilita Corrales, Babsie Molina and Jonathan Velasco.	
December 3	Unique Salonga	Bonifacio High Street	Taguig	High Street Serenade at 5th	—N/a	
December 3	Nica Del Rosario	Power Mac Center Spotlight, Circuit Makati	Makati	Balang Araw: Nica del Rosario's 12th Year Celebration Concert	—N/a	
December 7	Drag Race Philippines season 1 finalists (Precious Paula Nicole, Marina Summers, Eva Le Queen, Minty Fresh, Viñas DeLuxe, Brigiding, Lady Morgana, Turing, Corazon, Prince)	Music Museum	San Juan	Ho! Ho! Ho! Live at the Music Museum	—N/a	
December 9	Gloc-9, Shanti Dope, Al James, Flow G, CLR, Omar Baliw, Banda ni Kleggy, Butta B.	Vertis Event Ground, Vertis North	Quezon City	Salubong: The Christmas Concert Year 2	First face-to-face live convert event after last year's virtual concert.	
December 9	Jose Mari Chan, The Company	Newport Performing Arts Theater	Pasay	Christmas in our Hearts: Jose Mari Chan in Perfect CompanY	—N/a	
December 9	Itchyworms	Central Park, Filinvest City	Muntinlupa	Come Together for Christmas	—N/a	
December 9	Gloc-9, Greyhoundz	Cuneta Astrodome	Pasay	Rock for Charity	—N/a	
December 9	South Border, Neocolours	SMX Convention Center, SM Lanang Premier	Davao City	Tuloy Pa Rin Kahit Kailan Tour	—N/a	
December 10	Adie	Bonifacio High Street	Taguig	High Street Serenade at 5th	—N/a	
December 10	Darren Espanto, Moira Dela Torre, BGYO	Xiaomi Pop Venue BHS Amphitheater, Bonifacio Global City	Taguig City (Across the Bonifacio High Street Xiaomi Store)	Xiaomi Pop PH 2022: A Merry Xiaomi Christmas!	A free concert presented by Xiaomi Philippines.	
December 10	Various artists (Autotelic, Leanne & Naara, Fern., Jikamarie and others)	The Pop-Up, Katipunan Avenue	Quezon City	Docdefy X	Never the Strangers was also part of the original line-up, but they cancelled their performance after one of the band members tested positive for COVID-19.	
December 10	Bini	SM Mall Of Asia Music Hall	Pasay City	Spotify Wrapped 2022: Playground	A two-part concert presented by Spotify Philippines.	
December 11	BGYO	SM Mall Of Asia Music Hall	Pasay City	Spotify Wrapped 2022: Playground	A two-part concert presented by Spotify Philippines.	
December 12	December Avenue, Gracenote, The Vowels They Orbit, Hey June, Better Days, Jem, Carissa, Kiss n' Tell	Eton Centris Open Grounds	Quezon City	It's a Vibing December	—N/a	
December 14	Acel Bisa, Aia de Leon, Barbie Almalbis, Hannah Romawac, Kitchie Nadal and Lougee Basabas	123 Block, Mandala Park	Mandaluyong	Gabi Na Naman: Tanawin	A Thanksgiving and Listening Party following TANAW concert.	
December 15	MNL48	Music Museum	San Juan	MNL48; Magical Night of Love Christmas Concert	—N/a	
December 16	Bamboo, KZ Tandingan	CDC Parade Grounds	Clark Freeport Zone, Pampanga	Rock and Soul Supremacy	—N/a	
December 16	Franco, Urbandub	Central Park, Filinvest City	Muntinlupa	Come Together for Christmas	—N/a	
December 16	Basil Valdez	Music Museum	San Juan	Sundan ang Bituin: A Benefit Concert	—N/a	
December 17	Rey Valera, Marco Sison, Dulce	Music Museum	San Juan	Parol, Bibingka at Puto Bumbong: A Christmas Concert	—N/a	
December 17	Jose Mari Chan, Lola Amour	Bonifacio High Street	Taguig	High Street Serenade at 5th	—N/a	
December 18	SB19	Araneta Coliseum	Quezon City	WYAT: Where You At? Homecoming	—N/a	
December 18	Ben&Ben	SMDC Festival Grounds	Parañaque	Ben&Ben Homecoming Concert 2022: Manila	It was originally scheduled on September 3 (known as Ben&Ben Send-off Concert) at CCP Complex Open Grounds, but was postponed and rescheduled to a later date due to uncertain reasons.	
December 19	Various artists (including Mayonnaise, Adie, Lola Amour, Soapdish, Kenaniah, Dotty's World, and Earl Generao)	University of Santo Tomas	Manila	UST Paskuhan Concert 2022	The Paskuhan Concert series returns for the first time after 2 years since the COVID-19 pandemic.	
December 21	Various artists (including December Avenue, Zack Tabudlo, Juan Karlos, Zild, and Tanya Markova)	Sunken Garden, University of the Philippines Diliman	Quezon City	Social U: Polaris – Balik-UP Concert	The concert portion of the annual UP Lantern Parade returns for the first time after 2 years since the COVID-19 pandemic.	
December 22	Eraserheads	SMDC Festival Grounds	Parañaque	Huling El Bimbo Concert	First reunion concert since "The Final Set" in 2009.	
December 27	Banna Harbera	Social House, Circuit Makati	Makati	Sorry and Goodbye: Last Banna Gig	Final show of the band.	
December 31	Darren Espanto, SB19, Zephanie, Sponge Cola	Seaside Blvd., SM Mall of Asia	Pasay	SM Mall of Asia NYE Countdown to 2023	—N/a	
December 31	Gigi De Lana, Lani Misalucha	Newport Performing Arts Theater	Pasay	Power Divas: New Year’s Eve Concert	New Year's Eve events at Newport World Resorts	
December 31	TBA	The Plaza, Newport City	Pasay	New Year Countdown Party at The Plaza	New Year's Eve events at Newport World Resorts	
December 31	Arnel Pineda, KZ Tandingan, Liezel Garcia, TJ Monterde	Okada Manila	Parañaque	Okada Manila NYE: Rockin' 2023 Countdown Concert at the Grand Ballroom	—N/a	
December 31	Sam Concepcion, Elha Nympha	Okada Manila	Parañaque	Okada Manila NYE 2023: Razzle Dazzle at The Fountain	—N/a	
December 31	Sarah Geronimo, Bamboo, Morissette, Ebe Dancel, G-Force, DJ Mike Lavet	5th Avenue, Bonifacio Global City	Taguig	Alive!: BGC-Taguig Countdown to 2023	—N/a	
December 31	Christian Bautista, Yeng Constantino, Zack Tabudlo, Lola Amour	Eastwood City	Quezon City	Eastwood City New Year Countdown to 2023	First New Year's Eve concert open to the public since COVID-19 pandemic	

=== International artists ===
Date(s)	Artist(s)	Venue	City	Event / Tour	Note(s)	Ref(s)
May 29	NCT Dream, Key of Shinee, WEi and ALICE	Smart Araneta Coliseum	Quezon City	Begin Again: KPOP Edition	—N/a	
June 10	Kim Soo-hyun	Mall of Asia Arena	Pasay	One ExtraOrdinary Day Fan Meeting	—N/a	
June 26	Rowoon	Mall of Asia Arena	Pasay	Rowoon Live Fan Meeting in Manila	—N/a	
July 16	Louis Tomlinson	Smart Araneta Coliseum	Quezon City	Louis Tomlinson World Tour	Originally supposed to be held at the New Frontier Theater, but moved to a new venue due to public demand.	
July 22	Red Velvet	Mall of Asia Arena	Pasay	BE YOU: The World Will Adjust	With special guests BGYO, Bini and Lady Pipay.	
July 22	Yerin	New Frontier Theater	Quezon City	ARIA Fansign Event in Manila	—N/a	
July 22	Maximillian	Eastwood Mall	Quezon City	Maximillian: Live!	—N/a	
July 23	Maximillian	Venice Grand Canal Mall, McKinley Hill	Taguig	Maximillian: Live!	—N/a	
July 23	Youngjae	New Frontier Theater	Quezon City	SUGAR Mini Concert Tour	—N/a	
July 29	Jackson Wang, BamBam, and TREASURE	Mall of Asia Arena	Pasay	2022 K-Pop Masterz in Manila	—N/a	
July 29	Clive Farrington and Andrew Mann of When in Rome, Dave Jackson of The Room, and Ian Donaldson of H_{2}O	Grand Ballroom, Okada Manila	Parañaque	Sneak Attack 3: The Return	With special guests Orange and Lemons and other local bands.	
August 6	Cha Eun-woo	Smart Araneta Coliseum	Quezon City	Just One 10 Minute Starry Caravan in Manila	—N/a	
August 10	Johnny Orlando	Balara Content Studio	Quezon City	Harana in Manila: A Night of Lights and Serenade	—N/a	
August 13	Billie Eilish	Mall of Asia Arena	Pasay	Happier Than Ever, The World Tour	—N/a	
August 15	All Time Low	Mall of Asia Arena	Pasay	All Time Low: Live in Manila	With Chicosci as opening act.	
August 19	Yugyeom	New Frontier Theater	Quezon City	Yugyeom Live in Manila	—N/a	
August 27	The Maine	Skydome – SM City North EDSA	Quezon City	The Maine: Back in Manila	—N/a	
September 3	Alexander 23	Samsung Hall – SM Aura Premier	Taguig	Alexander 23 Live in Manila	—N/a	
September 4	NCT 127	Mall of Asia Arena	Pasay	Neo City – The Link	—N/a	
September 8–11	Planetshakers	Mall of Asia Arena	Pasay	Greater Asia Tour: Manila (Pasay City)	—N/a	
September 11	(G)I-dle	New Frontier Theater	Quezon City	Just Me ( )I-dle World Tour	—N/a	
September 11	Lapillus	Fairview Terraces	Quezon City	Lapillus Live at Ayala Malls	—N/a	
September 14	Valentina Ploy	Commune	Makati	Valentina Ploy Manila Showcase	—N/a	
September 16	Beabadoobee	New Frontier Theater	Quezon City	Beatopia Tour	—N/a	
September 23	The Script	Mall of Asia Arena	Pasay	The Script: Greatest Hits Tour	with Special Guest ANDREAH	
September 23	Youngjae, Ateez, IKon	Smart Araneta Coliseum	Quezon City	2022 K-Pop Masterz EP.2 in Manila	—N/a	
September 24	Hwang In-youp	New Frontier Theater	Quezon City	1st Asia Fan Meeting Tour	It was originally scheduled on August 20.	
September 27	Oh Wonder	Filinvest Tent – Filinvest City	Muntinlupa	Karpos Live: Oh Wonder	With special guest Paolo Sandejas	
September 29	Tony Hadley	Newport Performing Arts Theater	Pasay	40th Anniversary Tour	—N/a	
September 30	Jessi	Mall of Asia Arena	Pasay	ZOOM in Manila	—N/a	
September 30 – October 1	Troy Laureta, Loren Allred, Matt Bloyd, Cheesa	Newport Performing Arts Theater	Pasay	East Meets West – A Troy Laureta Live Experience	Also featuring Ogie Alcasid, Jed Madela, Jona, and Regine Velasquez-Alcasid with the special participation of Adah and Tanya Manalang	
October 1	Jay B	Smart Araneta Coliseum	Quezon City	Jay B Tape: Press Pause In Manila	—N/a	
October 2	Gulf Kanawut	Smart Araneta Coliseum	Quezon City	Gulf: 1st Fan Meeting in Manila	—N/a	
October 8	Jeremy Zucker	New Frontier Theater	Quezon City	More Noise World Tour	With special participation of Zack Tabudlo as opening act.	
October 10–11	Boys Like Girls	New Frontier Theater	Quezon City	Asia Tour	Originally scheduled to be held in 2020 but was postponed due to COVID-19 pandemic.	
October 10–11	Seventeen	Mall of Asia Arena	Pasay	Be The Sun World Tour	—N/a	
October 12	Boys Like Girls	Sky Hall – SM Seaside City Cebu	Cebu City	Asia Tour	Originally scheduled to be held in 2020 but was postponed due to COVID-19 pandemic.	
October 13	HAYD	The Top of the Alpha, Alphaland Tower	Makati	HAYD in the Clouds: Manila	—N/a	
October 16	Anne-Marie	New Frontier Theater	Quezon City	Dysfunctional Tour	—N/a	
October 20	Calum Scott	New Frontier Theater	Quezon City	Bridges World Tour	With special guests Mitch James and Darren Espanto.	
October 21	NCT Dream, WayV, Golden Child, Xdinary Heroes	Smart Araneta Coliseum	Quezon City	I-POP U 2022	—N/a	
October 22	Kang Daniel	New Frontier Theater	Quezon City	First Parade Asia Tour	—N/a	
October 23	Park Eun-bin	Skydome – SM City North EDSA	Quezon City	Park Eun-Bin Asia Fan Meeting Tour – Eun-Bin Note: Binkan	—N/a	
October 26	Michael Learns to Rock	Smart Araneta Coliseum	Quezon City	Back on the Road Tour 2022	With special guest Nina.	
October 27	Tomorrow X Together	Mall of Asia Arena	Pasay	Act: Lovesick	Originally scheduled on October 15–16 but was moved to a later date.	
October 28	Tomorrow X Together	Mall of Asia Arena	Pasay	Act: Lovesick	Originally scheduled on October 15–16 but was moved to a later date.	
October 28	Michael Learns to Rock	Waterfront Cebu City Hotel & Casino	Cebu City	Back on the Road Tour 2022	With special guest Nina.	
October 29	Michael Learns to Rock	SMX Convention Center – SM Lanang Premier	Davao City	Back on the Road Tour 2022	With special guest Nina.	
October 29	CL, Epik High, KARD, Pentagon, Gaho x KAVE, BGYO and DJ Soda	Mall of Asia Arena	Pasay	Hallyuween 2022	Philippines' first ever K-pop Halloween Party headlines by the 6 K-Pop artists alongside Philippines' very own idol group BGYO.	
October 30	The Bootleg Beatles	PICC Plenary Hall	Pasay	The Bootleg Beatles: Live	—N/a	
November 5	Russ	Mall of Asia Arena	Pasay	The Journey is Everything World Tour	With special guest Bugus.	
November 5	Jack White	Samsung Hall – SM Aura Premier	Taguig	Supply Chain Issues Tour	—N/a	
November 10	Eric Nam	Samsung Hall – SM Aura Premier	Taguig	There and Back Again Asia Tour	—N/a	
November 11	Jung Ho-Yeon	New Frontier Theater	Quezon City	Jung Ho-Yeon 1st Fanmeeting in Manila	—N/a	
November 11–13, 15–16	LANY	Mall of Asia Arena	Pasay	A November to Remember Tour	—N/a	
November 14	LANY	Solaire Resort & Casino	Parañaque	A Picture Perfect Night with LANY	—N/a	
November 16	Prep	Samsung Performing Arts Theater, Circuit Makati	Makati	PREP Live in Manila	—N/a	
November 17	Fiji Blue	Samsung Hall – SM Aura Premier	Taguig	Asia Tour 2022	—N/a	
November 19	F4 Thailand: Boys Over Flowers cast (Vachirawit Chivaaree, Win Metawin, Dew Jirawat, Nani Hirunkit)	World Trade Center Metro Manila	Pasay	Shooting Star: Asian Tour	—N/a	
November 21	Alec Benjamin	New Frontier Theater	Quezon City	The (Un)Commentary Tour	—N/a	
November 23	Jacob Collier	Filinvest Tent – Filinvest City	Muntinlupa	Karpos Live: DJESSE World Tour	—N/a	
November 26	Boy Pablo	New Frontier Theater	Quezon City	2022 Asia Tour	—N/a	
November 26	Bonnie Bailey, Moony, Sybil	The Platform Events Place, Newport World Resorts	Pasay	Club Divas Live in Manila	—N/a	
November 26	Everglow, AKMU, Momoland	Mall of Asia Arena	Pasay	Ripples For Hope 2022: A K-pop Friendship Day & Night	—N/a	
November 30	DPR	Filinvest Tent – Filinvest City	Muntinlupa	Karpos Live: Regime World Tour	—N/a	
December 3	STAYC	EVM Convention Center	Quezon City	STAYC 1st Fanmeeting in Manila	—N/a	
December 3	Stacey Ryan	Venice Grand Canal, McKinley Hill	Taguig	Fall in Love in Manila	—N/a	
December 4	Nadech Kugimiya, Yaya Sperbund	New Frontier Theater	Quezon City	Nadech & Yaya: 1st Fan Meet in Manila	—N/a	
December 8	Maroon 5	Mall of Asia Arena	Pasay	2020 Tour	—N/a	
December 8	TVXQ, BoA, Exo's Chen and Xiumin	Mactan Newtown Open Grounds	Cebu	Be You 2: The World Will Care	With special guest Pilita Corrales, Ian Veneracion, Lady Pipay, G22 (Manila only), and Lukas Magallano (Cebu only)	
December 9	TVXQ, BoA, Exo's Chen and Xiumin	Smart Araneta Coliseum	Quezon City	Be You 2: The World Will Care	With special guest Pilita Corrales, Ian Veneracion, Lady Pipay, G22 (Manila only), and Lukas Magallano (Cebu only)	
December 9	Lacuna Coil	Samsung Hall – SM Aura Premier	Taguig	Lacuna Coil Live in Manila	—N/a	
December 11	Keshi	New Frontier Theater	Quezon City	Hell/Heaven Tour	—N/a	
December 11	Nurse Blake	The Theatre, Solaire Resort & Casino	Parañaque	The PTO Comedy Tour	—N/a	
December 15	Air Supply	Newport Performing Arts Theater	Pasay	Lost in Love Experience Tour	—N/a	
December 17	Seventeen	Philippine Arena	Bocaue, Bulacan	Seventeen World Tour: Be the Sun	—N/a	
December 17	Acraze	SMDC Festival Grounds	Parañaque	Alesso Live in Manila	Alesso cancelled his supposed scheduled performance due to uncertain reasons. With supporting acts from DJs Ace Ramos, Martin Pulgar, Marc Marasigan, Rico Arce, Kat DJ, Deuce, Katsy Lee, and David Ardiente.	
December 17–18	Super Junior	Mall of Asia Arena	Pasay	Super Show 9: Road	Originally scheduled for August 6, but Super Junior member Siwon did not join the concert after he tested positive for COVID-19. On that same day, it was announced that the event had been reorganized as a fan meet and greet after an announcement that Eunhyuk's father had died shortly before the event. This was later rescheduled as a two-night concert.	
December 31	Tujamo	Cove Manila, Okada Manila	Parañaque	Okada Manila NYE: 2023 'Til Infinity Countdown Party at Cove Manila	With supporting acts from DJs Marc Marasigan, Migs Santillan, Mike Lavarez, and Jenil.	

=== Virtual concerts ===
Date(s)	Artist(s)	Venue	City	Event / Tour	Note(s)	Ref(s)
January 23	Morissette	Remote location		PHOENIX : Morissette's 10th Anniversary Concert	Aired via live streaming through KTX.ph	
January 28–29	Angeline Quinto (with Moira Dela Torre and Nina)	Metropolitan Theater	Manila	10Q: Ten Years of Angeline Quinto at the Metropolitan Theatre – Part 4	Aired via live streaming through KTX.ph	
January 30	Belle Mariano	Remote location		Daylight: A Belle Mariano Digital Concert	Aired via live streaming through KTX.ph	
February 12–13	Bini, BGYO	Remote location		One Dream: The Bini & BGYO Concert Version 2022	Aired via live streaming through KTX.ph	
February 18–19	Angeline Quinto (with Ogie Alcasid (January 30), Kyla, KZ Tandingan and Yeng Constantino (DIVAS reunion))	Metropolitan Theater	Manila	10Q: Ten Years of Angeline Quinto at the Metropolitan Theatre – Part 5	Aired via live streaming through KTX.ph	
March 5	Zack Tabudlo	Remote location		Sabihin Mo Na: A Zack Tabudlo Digital Concert	Aired via live streaming through Facebook and YouTube	
April 9–10	Julie Anne San Jose	Remote location		Limitless Musical Trilogy – Part 3: Rise	Aired via live streaming through Synergy	
April 22	Gary Valenciano, Regine Velasquez, Noel Cabangon, Brownman Revival, Kitchie Nadal, Nyoy Volante, Lou Bonnevie	Remote location		Earthday Jam 2022	Aired via live streaming through YouTube (Earthday Jam Foundation)	
April 30	Anji Salvacion	Remote location		Feels: The Concert	Aired via live streaming through KTX.ph	
May	Various K-Pop artists	Remote location		KCON 2022	Aired via live streaming through Smart GigaPlay	
September 23	5 Seconds of Summer	Royal Albert Hall	London, United Kingdom	The Feeling of Falling Upwards – Global Livestream	Aired via live streaming through Dreamstage	
September 24–25	BGYO	H&M Virtual Universe		BGYO Celestial Spaces: H&M Concert from the Virtual Universe	—N/a	
September 24–25	Various international artists (including Black Eyed Peas, Avril Lavigne, Diplo, Halsey, Megan Thee Stallion, Sam Smith, Pitbull, and The Black Keys)	T-Mobile Arena	Las Vegas, United States	iHeartRadio Music Festival 2022	Aired via live streaming on Smart GigaPlay	
October 15	Various artists	Remote location		Gabay Guro Grand Gathering 2022	Aired via live streaming through Facebook and YouTube (Gabay Guro)	
October 29	Coldplay	River Plate Stadium	Buenos Aires, Argentina	Music of the Spheres World Tour	Aired via live streaming; showing at selected SM Cinema branches nationwide	
November 17	Morissette, Christian Bautista, Janella Salvador, Stell of SB19, Zack Tabudlo and Zephanie	Various remote locations		A Night of Wonder (Disney+ Philippines Launch)	Hosted by Robi Domingo and Catriona Gray. Aired via live streaming through Disney+, as well as on Facebook and TikTok (Disney+ Philippines). Note: The livestream event is pre-recorded.	
November 17	BTS	SoFi Stadium	Los Angeles, United States	Permission to Dance on Stage: LA	Streamed via Disney+ Philippines; Note: The event was streamed since September 8 (2 months prior to the launch of Disney+ in the Philippines)	
November 21	Elton John (with special guests Dua Lipa, Kiki Dee and Brandi Carlile)	Dodger Stadium	Los Angeles, United States	Elton John Live: Farewell from Dodger Stadium	Streamed via Disney+ Philippines	
December 10	Various international artists (including Dua Lipa, Lizzo, Charlie Puth, Backstreet Boys, The Kid Laroi, AJR, Demi Lovato, Lauv, Ava Max, Dove Cameron and Jax)	Madison Square Garden	New York City, United States	iHeartRadio Jingle Ball 2022	Aired via live streaming on Smart Livestream	
December 30	Various artists	Various remote locations		BYE 2022: Music is Universal	Aired via live streaming through Facebook, YouTube and TikTok (UMUSIC Philippines)	

=== Music festivals ===
Date(s)	Artist(s)	Venue	City	Festival	Note(s)	Ref(s)
January 22	Various artists, including: Kyla; Zephanie; Fana; Quest; Rob Deniel; Sam Concepcion; Adie; This Band; Leanne & Naara; Sud; Jikamarie	Various remote locations		Kumu Music Night	Aired via live streaming on Kumu	
February 26	Various artists, including: The Itchyworms; Munimuni; Lola Amour; Clara Benin; Oh, Flamingo!; Of Mercury; Raven; Carousel Casualties; allen&elle	Various remote locations		Cosmos: An OPM Festival	Aired via live streaming on Facebook	
March 19	December Avenue; Silent Sanctuary; Ace Ramos; Marc Marasigan	Central District Football Field	Bacolod	Love Dance Festival: Sunset Fest 2022	—N/a	
March 25–26	Various artists, including: Alamat; Ataska; Bandang Lapis; Jerald Napoles; Katrina Velarde; Kim Molina; LITZ; Lyca Gairanod; Magnus Haven; Mark Bautista; Matteo Guidicelli; PPop Generation; Rob Deniel; Sarah Geronimo; SB NewGen; The Juans; This Band; Thyro Alfaro; Wilbert Ross; Yumi Lacsamana	Various remote locations		Padayon: Online Concert for Typhoon Odette	Aired via live streaming on KTX.ph	
April 9–10	Various artists, including: 1st.One; 4th Impact; Alamat; BGYO; Bini; KAIA; MNL48; Press Hit Play; SB19; VXON	Araneta Coliseum	Quezon City	2022 P-POP CON	—N/a	
April 9	Various, including: Ex Battalion; Siakol; Aegis; Andrew E.; Salbakuta; Toni Gonzaga; Bayani Agbayani; Karla Estrada; Dulce; Rodjun Cruz; Dianne Medina; Anton Diva; Renz Verano; Beverly Salviejo; The Dukes Band; Plethora; The Fridays Band; ILT	Leyte Grandstand, Leyte Sports Complex	Tacloban	Grand Rally: A Free Concert for BBM-Sara UniTeam	—N/a	
April 23	Hale; Silent Sanctuary; Meg Fernandez	The Amphitheater – SM City Pampanga	Pampanga	Castaway Music Festival 2022	—N/a	
April 30	December Avenue; Gloc-9; Aia de Leon; Magnus Haven; Matthaios; 1st.One; Bini; Jumanji; Itchyworms	Philippine Arena	Bulacan	Maligaya Summer Blast 2022	—N/a	
April 30	Various, including: Sandwich; 6cyclemind; Moonstar88; Imago; Gracenote; Pedicab; Banda ni Kleggy; The Vowels They Orbit; We Got; JEM; Kiss n' Tell; Bey; Hey June!	Market! Market!	Taguig	ALive!: Happy Plays Music Festival	—N/a	
May 14	Various, including: Sandwich; 6cyclemind; Moonstar88; Imago; Gracenote; Pedicab; Banda ni Kleggy; The Vowels They Orbit; We Got; JEM; Kiss n' Tell; Bey; Hey June!	Ayala Malls Solenad	Santa Rosa, Laguna	ALive!: Happy Plays Music Festival	—N/a	
May 28	Various, including: Sandwich; 6cyclemind; Moonstar88; Imago; Gracenote; Pedicab; Banda ni Kleggy; The Vowels They Orbit; We Got; JEM; Kiss n' Tell; Bey; Hey June!	Ayala Malls Manila Bay	Parañaque	ALive!: Happy Plays Music Festival	—N/a	
June 4	Various, including: Sandwich; 6cyclemind; Moonstar88; Imago; Gracenote; Pedicab; Banda ni Kleggy; The Vowels They Orbit; We Got; JEM; Kiss n' Tell; Bey; Hey June!	Alabang Town Center	Muntinlupa	ALive!: Happy Plays Music Festival	—N/a	
June 11	Various, including: Sandwich; 6cyclemind; Moonstar88; Imago; Gracenote; Pedicab; Banda ni Kleggy; The Vowels They Orbit; We Got; JEM; Kiss n' Tell; Bey; Hey June!	Glorietta	Makati	ALive!: Happy Plays Music Festival	—N/a	
July 22	Various, including: Sandwich; 6cyclemind; Moonstar88; Imago; Gracenote; Pedicab; Banda ni Kleggy; The Vowels They Orbit; We Got; JEM; Kiss n' Tell; Bey; Hey June!	U.P. Town Center	Quezon City	ALive!: Happy Plays Music Festival	—N/a	
June 10	Zack Tabudlo; Adie; Skusta Clee; Kiyo; Al James; Because; Alisson Shore; ALLMO$T; Michael Pangilinan; Ronnie Alonte	Clark Global City, Clark Freeport Zone	Pampanga	AURORA 2022: Clark Hot Air Balloon and Music Festival	—N/a	
June 11	Ben&Ben; December Avenue; Arthur Nery; Unique Salonga	Clark Global City, Clark Freeport Zone	Pampanga	AURORA 2022: Clark Hot Air Balloon and Music Festival	—N/a	
June 18	Zack Tabudlo; The Juans; Adie; Nobita; I Belong to the Zoo	Cove Manila, Okada Manila	Parañaque	Malaya Music Fest 2022	—N/a	
June 19	Ben&Ben; Urbandub; Mayonnaise; Moonstar88; Imago	Cove Manila, Okada Manila	Parañaque	Malaya Music Fest 2022	—N/a	
June 21	Various artists, including: Marc Fichel; DJ Blutch; Maxime Cozic	Siargao		Fete De La Musique Philippines 2022	—N/a	
June 23–24	Various artists, including: Marc Fichel; DJ Blutch; Maxime Cozic	Sofitel Philippine Plaza Manila	Pasay	Fete De La Musique Philippines 2022	—N/a	
June 24	Various artists, including: Marc Fichel; DJ Blutch; Maxime Cozic	Poblacion	Makati	Fete De La Musique Philippines 2022	—N/a	
June 25	Various artists, including: Marc Fichel; DJ Blutch; Maxime Cozic	Intramuros	Manila	Fete De La Musique Philippines 2022	—N/a	
June 25	Various artists, including: Marc Fichel; DJ Blutch; Maxime Cozic	Cebu		Fete De La Musique Philippines 2022	—N/a	
June 26	Various artists, including: Marc Fichel; DJ Blutch; Maxime Cozic	Baguio		Fete De La Musique Philippines 2022	—N/a	
June 26	Various artists, including: Marc Fichel; DJ Blutch; Maxime Cozic	Pampanga		Fete De La Musique Philippines 2022	—N/a	
June 26, 28	Various artists, including: Marc Fichel; DJ Blutch; Maxime Cozic	El Nido	Palawan	Fete De La Musique Philippines 2022	—N/a	
July 2	Silent Sanctuary; Adie; Al James; Agsunta; Munimuni; Lola Amour; Because; Nobita; Bandang Lapis; DJ Jet Boado; DJ Patty Tiu; MC Boo	Bulacan Sports Complex	Malolos, Bulacan	Malo Summer Fest 2.0	—N/a	
July 15	Various artists, including: 1st.One; Alamat; BGYO; Bini; LITZ; MNL48; PPop Generation; Press Hit Play; VXON	Mall of Asia Arena	Pasay	Tugatog: Filipino Music Festival	—N/a	
July 16	Various, including: Ben&Ben; Zack Tabudlo; Adie; Nobita; Mayonnaise; Agsunta; Ace Ramos	Batangas Provincial Sports Complex	Batangas	SIGLA Music Festival	—N/a	
July 24	Various, including: Juan Karlos; Fern.; Blaster and the Celestial Klowns; Cheats; One Click Straight; Over October; dia maté; Elise Huang; Chen Pangan; 10 a.m. Departure	Venice Grand Canal, McKinley Hill	Taguig	Nomad: An Island Records Philippines Festival	—N/a	
August 6	Pamungkas; Ben&Ben; Mayonnaise; Aia de Leon; SOS; Blaster and the Celestial Klowns	123 Block, Mandala Park	Mandaluyong	Gabi na Naman: Gimme Shelter	Cheats, Munimuni and Clara Benin were originally part of the lineup, but won't be able to perform due to unforeseen circumstances.	
August 13	Various artists	123 Block, Mandala Park	Mandaluyong	The Last Ninja Fest	The La Union leg on August 20 has been cancelled due to health and safety concerns.	
September 17	Phum Viphurit; The Juans; KAIA; BugABoo; Matthaios; Unique Salonga; I Belong to the Zoo; JOEM; Lola Amour; Cast of Drag Race Philippines; Arthur Miguel; Paul Pablo	Globe Circuit Event Grounds	Makati	G Music Fest 2022	First face-to-face event of the annual music festival after 2 consecutive virtual editions. Also aired via live streaming on Globe Virtual Hangouts.	
September 30	Sandwich; 6cyclemind; Gracenote; Banda ni Kleggy; The Vowels They Orbit; We Got; JEM; Better Days; Hey June!	Ayala Malls The 30th	Pasig	ALive!: Happy Plays Music Festival	—N/a	
October 1	Bamboo; Darren Espanto; Jeremy Glinoga; KZ Tandingan; Jon Guelas; Ez Mil; SAB; Angela Ken; Tara Flanagan; Apostol; Mc Zani; Clencha; Clarissa Mae; Justine; DJ Miamor; DJ Menace; DJ Flecs; DJ Jeff Nang; Waleska; Efra	Apps Court Farm, Hurst Rd, Walton-on-Thames KT12 2EG, United Kingdom	London	1MX London 2022	Originally, it was planned on July 23, 2022, but rescheduled on October 1, 2022, due to "travel concerns"	
October 8	Various rock artists and bands, including: Urbandub; Rico Blanco; Mayonnaise; Sandwich; Hilera; Soapdish; Chelsea Alley	Metrotent Convention Center	Pasig	Macbeth Music Festival	—N/a	
October 14–15	Various artists and bands	World Trade Center	Pasay	Dutdutan 2022	—N/a	
October 15	Various artists and bands, including: Kamikazee; Franco; Urbandub; Blaster; Jose Carlito; Ena Mori; Kiyo; Waiian; Bawal Clan	Globe Circuit Event Grounds	Makati	The Rail SOS: Skate. Music. Art. Fashion.	—N/a	
October 17–23	Various artists and bands, including: Darren Espanto; December Avenue; Zack Tabudlo; Morissette; Blaster; Zild; Cheats; Justin Vazquez; dia maté; Fern.; Kindred; One Click Straight; Nica Del Rosario; lullaboy; Elise Huang; VVS Collective; 8 Ballin'; Juan Karlos; Zephanie; Bonnie Bailey	The Podium	Mandaluyong	UMUSIC Fanverse 2022	Also featuring the finalists of Drag Race Philippines season 1 on October 21. With special pre-recorded performances from New Hope Club, Yungblud, The Sundown, Southernwave, Jazelle, Travis Atreo and Sepia Times.	
October 21–23	Various artists	Tourism Strip Mainstage, Lacson	Bacolod	Masskara Sunset Stage	—N/a	
October 21	Various K-pop and P-pop artists	CCP Open Grounds	Pasay	Popstival 2022	—N/a	
October 22	Various, including: Rico Blanco; December Avenue; Unique Salonga; Kean Cipriano; Adie; Mayonnaise; Matthaios; Nobita; Al James	CSI Stadia	Dagupan	Gig One Dagupan	—N/a	
October 31	Bamboo; Mayonnaise; Magnus Haven; Ron Henley; Gloc-9; Shanti Dope; Nik Makino; Marc Marasigan; X Factor; Katsy Lee; Patty Tiu; MC Blain; MC Ronthug	Globe Circuit Event Grounds	Makati	Halloween Howlers 2022	—N/a	
November 11–12	Various Pinoy hip hop artists	Metrotent Convention Center	Pasig	Calle Con: Urban Music & Fashion Festival 2022	—N/a	
November 19	Various artists and DJs, including: Nik Makino; Issa Lo Ki; Siobe Lim; Young JV; Mix Fenix; Katsy Lee; HOEST; Marc Marasigan; Ron Poe; Kate Jagdon	CCP Open Grounds	Pasay	Verve: An Epic Music Festival	—N/a	
November 19	Ben&Ben; December Avenue; Zack Tabudlo; Arthur Nery; Adie; Unique Salonga; Al James; Kiyo; Victor Jao; Kate Jagdon; Via Chan; Kyle Zagado	City di Mare Event Grounds, South Road Properties	Cebu City	Cebu Aurora Festival	—N/a	
November 26	Various Pinoy rock artists, including: Blaster and the Celestial Klowns; Tanya Markova; CHNDTR; Agaw Agimat	Marikina Sports Center	Marikina	Tunog at Letra Music Festival 2022	—N/a	
November 27	I Belong to the Zoo; TJ Monterde; MC Einstein; NKO; Claudine Co; Kenji; Pau Dimaranan; Kit Inciong; Myca Capili; Kim Macaraig	Trinoma	Quezon City	ALive: Just Music Festival	—N/a	
December 2–4	Various artists and DJs, including: Johnny Stimson; Joan; Ely Buendia; Parokya ni Edgar; Rico Blanco; Barbie Almalbis; Moonstar88; Orange and Lemons	Enchanted Kingdom	Santa Rosa, Laguna	Salo Salo Fest 2022	—N/a	
December 3	Various, including: Ben&Ben; December Avenue; Zack Tabudlo; Adie; Kiyo; Mayonnaise; Lola Amour; Al James	Cabuyao Athletes Basic School Grounds – Cabuyao City Government Complex	Cabuyao, Laguna	SIGLA Music Festival: Laguna	Originally supposed to be held at The Plaza Concert Grounds in Calamba, Laguna, but the venue has changed due to unknown issues. 2nd leg of the SIGLA Music Festival series.	
December 9–10	Joji; Jackson Wang; Niki; Rich Brian; EaJ; Yoasobi; Adawa; Akini Jing; Atarashii Gakko!; Bibi; Elephante; Guapdad 4000; Jinxzhou; Manila Grey; Milli; Spence Lee; Stephanie Poetri; Warren Hue; Ylona Garcia; Zack Tabudlo; Denise Julia; August 8; Manila Killa; SB19; Zedd (special guest)	SMDC Festival Grounds	Parañaque	Head in the Clouds Festival: Manila	—N/a	
December 16	Parokya ni Edgar; Arthur Nery; Over October; Kritiko; DJ Hannah Ichiko	The Island – The Palace Manila, Uptown Bonifacio	Taguig	JBL Sound Fest 2022	—N/a	
December 17	M1LDL1FE; Ysa Yaneza; Cheats; Ang Bandang Shirley; Lola Amour; Gabba; Munimuni; Any Name's Okay; Narda; One Click Straight; Oh, Flamingo!; Kindred	123 Block, Mandala Park	Mandaluyong	Gabi na Naman: Year-End Party	—N/a	
December 30	Zack Tabudlo; Mayonnaise; Silent Sanctuary; This Band	Blue Bay Walk, Metropolitan Park	Pasay	Blue Bay Walk Music Fest: Countdown to 2023	—N/a	

=== Canceled/postponed dates ===
Date(s)	Artist(s)	Venue	City	Event / Tour	Reasons	Ref(s)
August 6	Super Junior	Mall of Asia Arena	Pasay	Super Show 9: The Road	Super Junior member Siwon won't be join in the concert after he tested positive for COVID-19. On August 6, it was announced that the event had been reorganized as a fan meet and greet after an announcement that Eunhyuk's father had died shortly before actual staging the concert. Concert was later rescheduled to December 17–18.	
August 20	Various artists	Surf City	San Juan, La Union	The Last Ninja Fest: La Union	Health and safety concerns (COVID-19 protocols)	
September 22–24	Various artists and DJs	Iligan City Wet Park	Iligan	Iligan Music Festival	Arthur Nery, included in the original artist lineup, has backed out from the event. It was later announced that after the unsuccessful 1st night of the festival (due to an attendance of a few number of festival goers and forced to do livestream amid criticism and received negative views), the organizers had been officially cancelled the rest of the entire festival.	
September 27	Pink Sweats	New Frontier Theater	Quezon City	Pink Moon World Tour	Unforeseen circumstances, as announced by organizer Live Nation Philippines.	
October 27	The Bootleg Beatles	SMX Convention Center – SM Lanang Premier	Davao City	The Bootleg Beatles: Live	Unforeseen production logistics; Manila concert will proceed.	
October 29	The Bootleg Beatles	Waterfront Hotel and Casino	Cebu City	The Bootleg Beatles: Live	Unforeseen production logistics; Manila concert will proceed.	
October 29	Justin Bieber	CCP Complex Open Grounds	Pasay	Justice World Tour	It was announced by Bieber and AEG Live that all of his remaining 2022 schedule of his tour after October 18 (including the Manila leg) will be postponed and rescheduled to a later date in 2023 (unless otherwise advised) due to Bieber prioritizing his health.	
November 3	Avril Lavigne	Smart Araneta Coliseum	Quezon City	Love Sux Tour	Postponed to 2023 (along with Hong Kong), due to scheduling and logistic issues. Originally scheduled to be part of Head Above Water Tour but moved due to COVID-19 pandemic.	
November 18–19	Alanis Morissette	SM Mall of Asia Arena	Pasay	World Tour: 25 Years of Jagged Little Pill	Scheduling conflicts and logistical challenging issues. Originally scheduled to be held in 2020 but was postponed due to COVID-19 pandemic.	
December 3	Clinton Kane	New Frontier Theater	Quezon City	Someday It'll All Be Ok Tour	Unforeseen circumstances.	
December 7	Sarah Brightman	Smart Araneta Coliseum	Quezon City	A Christmas Symphony Tour	Unforeseen circumstances. Originally supposed to be held her concert as part of the "HYMN World Tour" in 2020 which was postponed/cancelled due to the COVID-19 pandemic.	
December 15	Everglow	New Frontier Theater	Quezon City	Everglow: Southeast Asia Tour	Unspecified reason yet to be announced.	

== Deaths ==
- January 23 – Romano Vasquez (b. 1971), former actor and singer
- February 21 – Jomer "OG Kaybee" Galicia (b. 1988), rapper
- March 22 – Eva Castillo (b. 1969), singer
- March 29 – Jun Lopito (b. 1958), guitarist
- April 7 – Carlos Salazar (b. 1930), actor and singer
- October 3 – Mon Legaspi (b. 1968), bassist for The Dawn and Wolfgang
- October 31 – Danny Javier (b. 1947), singer-songwriter and member of APO Hiking Society
- December 1 – Sylvia La Torre (b. 1933), singer and actress
- December 9 – Jovit Baldivino (b. 1993), singer
