= Harbor Point (Subic) =

Shopping mall in the Philippines

Ayala Malls Harbor Point
- Location: Olongapo City, Philippines
- Coordinates: 14°49′29″N 120°16′49″E
- Address: Rizal Avenue, Subic Bay Freeport Zone
- Opened: April 26, 2012; 14 years ago
- Developer: Ayala Land, Inc.
- Manager: Ayala Malls
- Owner: Ayala Corporation
- Num. of stores: Over 300 shops and restaurants
- Floor area: 53,787 m^{2} (578,960 sq ft)
- Floors: 3 levels
- Parking: more than 500 cars
- Website: ayalamalls.com.ph/malls-philippines/harbor-point

Ayala Malls Harbor Point is a shopping mall in Subic Bay Freeport Zone in Olongapo City, Philippines owned by property development firm Ayala Land, Inc., a real estate subsidiary of Ayala Corporation. This mall has a total gross floor area of 53,787 m^{2} (578,960 sq ft). It is the first Ayala mall located in the Olongapo portion of the Subic Bay Freeport Zone and the second in the Central Luzon region.

The Mall is located across the river (a foot bridge essentially connects the two locations) from its significant market competition, SM City Olongapo Downtown, owned by SM Prime Holdings which will become SBFZ's new Central Business District. The mall was named Harbor Point because of SBFZ's bayside location. It was opened on April 26, 2012.

The mall is composed of three major levels. It also has a Puregold supermarket which serves as the anchor store.

== History ==
Ayala Land signed in October 2009 an agreement with the Subic Bay Metropolitan Authority (SBMA), for the development of a 7.5-hectare property along Rizal Highway within the Subic Bay Freeport Zone, straddling the boundary between the Olongapo portion of the Subic Bay Freeport Zone and Barangay Asinan of Olongapo near the free port's main gate. Ayala Land Inc. envisions the development of an integrated mixed-use master-planned community which will include a shopping mall, Business Process Outsourcing office building, and hotel that will rise in the SBFZ Central Business District. This development is part of the company's strategy to establish mixed-use master-planned growth centers in various parts of the country More than 400 local and international companies may locate at the Ayala Harbor Point mall.

== Gallery ==
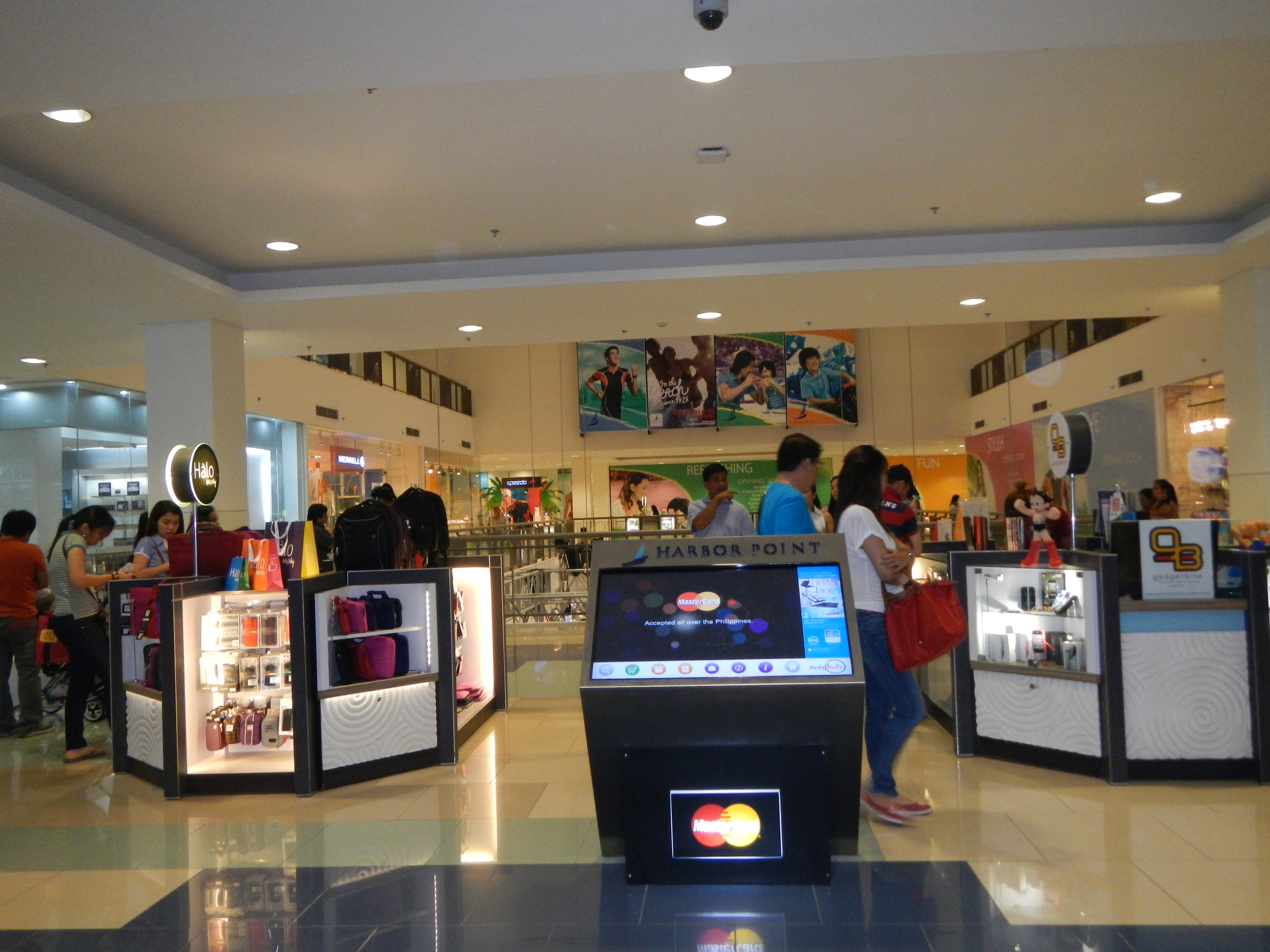
Screen map of the mall and stores

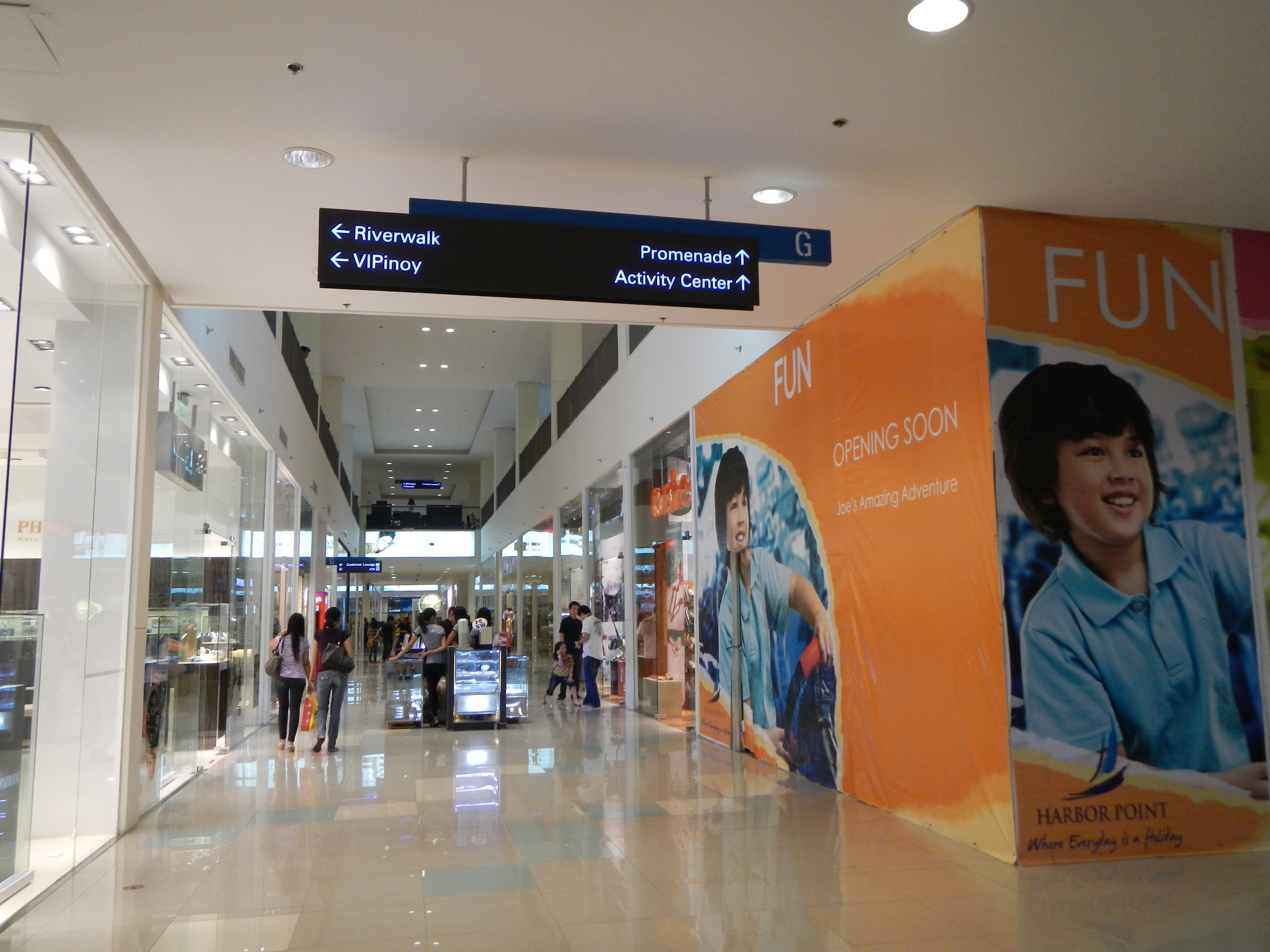
Interior

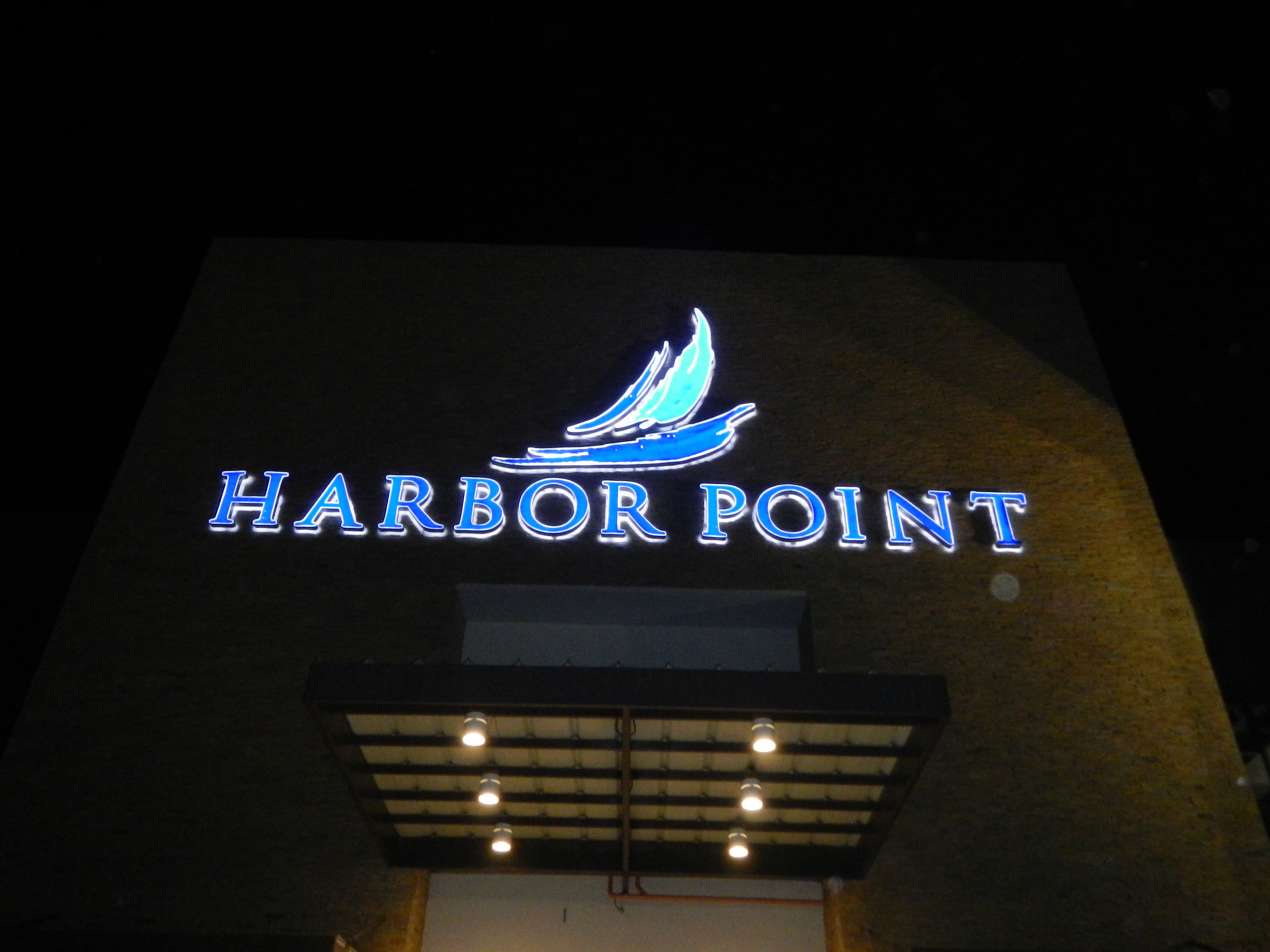
Frontage

Night landscape

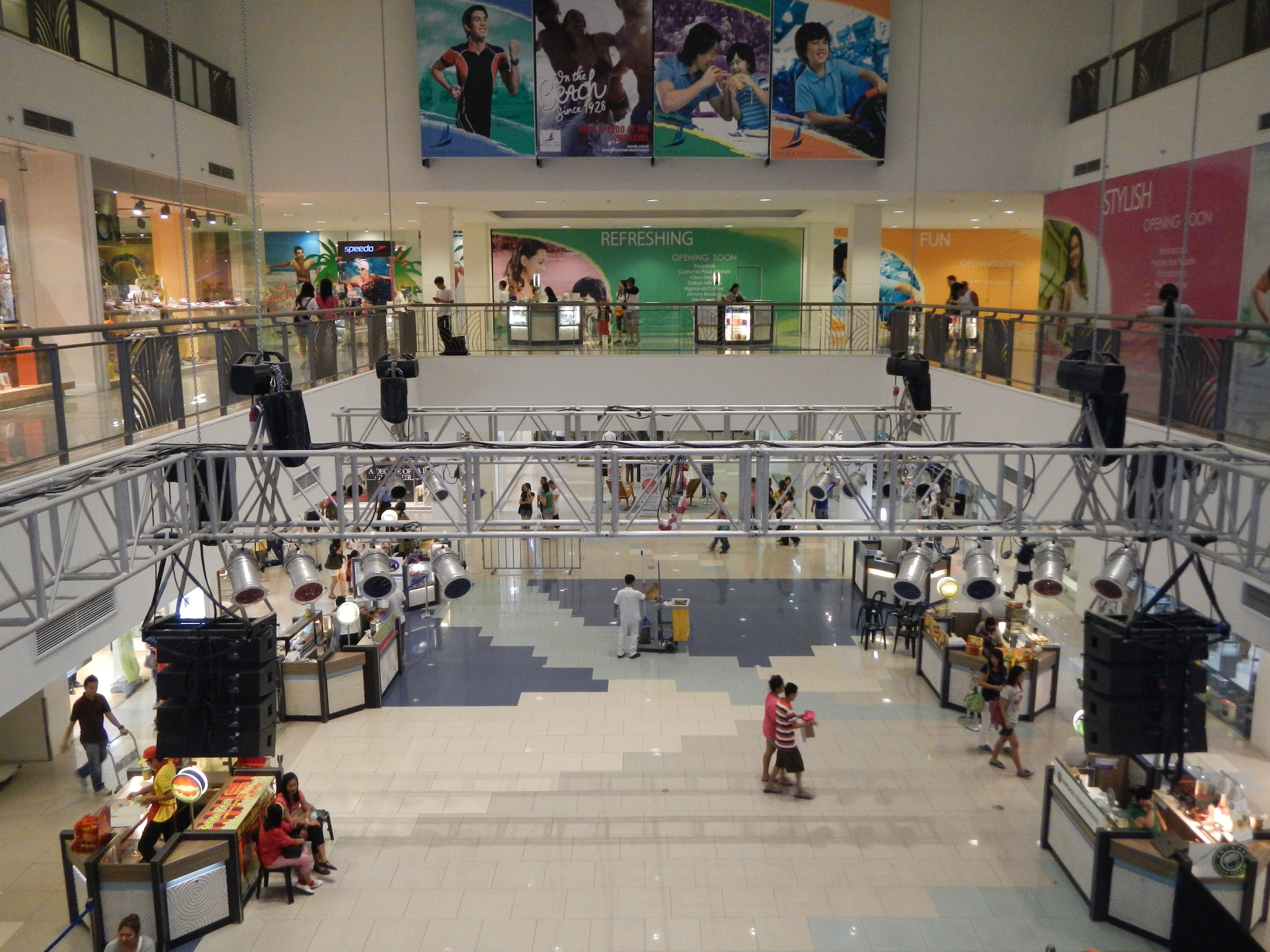
View of the floors

== See also ==
- SM City Olongapo Central
- SM City Olongapo Downtown
- List of shopping malls in the Philippines
