= Sud (band) =

Filipino indie rock/jazz fusion band

- Origin: Manila, Philippines
- Genres: Indie; Alternative Soul
- Years active: 2011–present
- Labels: Yellow Room Music Philippines; Araw Sa Gabi Artist Management
- Members: Sud Ballecer; Carlos de la Fuente; Kohl Aguilar; Raisa Racelis
- Past members: Gelo Acosta; Sam Valenia; Carlo Maraingan; Marc Reyes; Chii Balanaa; Jimbo Cuenco

Sud (pronounced sōōd) is a Filipino alternative soul band formed in 2011. The band is composed of Sud Ballecer on vocals and guitar, Carlos de la Fuente on saxophone, Kohl Aguilar on keyboards, Raisa Racelis on bass.

They are currently signed to the Yellow Room Music Philippines, an independent label founded by Monty Macalino of Mayonnaise, and are under Araw Sa Gabi Artist Management.

The band is popularly known for their mainstream hit 'Sila' which they released in 2015. The mentioned track also started the 'Sud Cinematic Universe' with its short-film-like music video, which featured a narrative-driven style that the band would later carry over to their subsequent releases. This approach became part of their artistic identity, blending music with visual storytelling. The song received significant airplay on local radio and streaming platforms, and its success helped the band gain widespread recognition in the Philippine indie music scene. 'Sila' ultimately marked a breakthrough in their career and cemented their reputation as one of the prominent acts in the OPM alternative scene.

== Band members ==
=== Current ===
- Sud Ballecer - vocals
- Raisa Racelis - bass
- Patrick Felipe - drums
- Carlos de la Fuente - saxophone
- Kohl Aguilar - keyboards

=== Performing Members ===
- Patrick Felipe - drums
- Harrold Go - guitars

=== Former ===
- Gelo Acosta (rhythm guitar, backing vocals)
- Sam Valenia (guitar, backing vocals)
- Carlo Maraingan (percussion)
- Marc Reyes (bass)
- Chii Balanaa (guitar)
- Jimbo Cuenco (drums)

== Discography ==
=== Studio albums ===
| Year | Album | Label | Ref(s) |
|---|---|---|---|
| 2016 | Skin | Self-released | |
| 2021 | Dumaloy | Warner Music Philippines | |

=== Singles ===
- "Smilky"
- "Profanities"
- "Make U Say"
- "Sila"
- "Show Me"
- "How We Play"
- "Di Makatulog"
- "Huwag na Huwag Mong Sasabihin" (original by Kitchie Nadal)
- "Headlights"
- "Baliw"
- "Sana Bumalik"
- "Sagutan"
- "Dumaloy"
- "Ginhawa"
- "Baka Bukas"
- "Yakal"
- "Gusto Ko Lang Mag-Isa"
- "Obviously"
