= The Vowels They Orbit =

Filipino alternative and pop band

- Origin: Metro Manila, Philippines
- Genres: OPM / Pinoy rock Indie pop Pop rock
- Years active: 2018–present
- Labels: Soupstar Entertainment; Sony Music Philippines
- Members: Nikka Melchor; Hannah Dela Cruz; Gene Santiago; Patch Javier
- Past members: Jeremy Sayas

The Vowels They Orbit, also known as The VTO, is a 5-piece indie pop/rock band from Metro Manila, Philippines. They consist of Nikka Melchor (vocals and guitar), Hannah Dela Cruz (keyboard and backup vocals), Jeremy Sayas (drums and backup vocals), Gene Santiago (guitar), and Patch Javier (bass). The band is represented by Soupstar Entertainment.

== History ==
The bandmates knew each other since 2013, when they were all in high school. The band was formed in 2018 while they were in college at the University of Santo Tomas. The band name came from when the five of them practiced together at night and would go stargazing after. After signing with Soupstar Music, they became openers for the Manila concert of American pop rock band Against the Current a few months later.

In 2019, the band officially signed to Sony Music Philippines, and were the first artists to be signed to the label, as Sony was making its return to the Philippine music scene at the time. They also released their debut single "Selos" that year. It became a hit on Spotify, with 350,000 streams soon after its release, and reached #2 on the Spotify Philippines Top 50 Viral Charts. In 2020, the band released their debut 5-track EP Ang Unang Ikot, featuring previous releases like "Selos" and "Kiliti".

On November 11, 2021, the band released their comeback single "Una", which was also the lead single for their second EP. They released their second EP, tuloy tuloy tuloy!, on March 10, 2023, which was also their fifth anniversary.

== Artistry ==
Although the band is known as indie-pop, they combine different genres such as folk, mellow rock, alternative, soul, and jazz. Rick Olivares of ABS-CBN compared them to a young Up Dharma Down. The band has cited Moonstar88 and Swedish rock band The Cardigans as their influences.

== Band members ==
=== Current Members ===
- Nikka Melchor – lead vocals, guitar
- Hannah Dela Cruz – keyboard, backup vocals
- Gene Santiago – guitar
- Patch Javier – bass

=== Former Members ===
- Jeremy Sayas – drums, backup vocals

== Accolades ==
Award	Year	Nominees	Category	Result	Ref.
Wish 107.5 Music Awards	2021	"Kiliti"	Wishclusive Contemporary R&B Performance of the Year	Nominated	
Wish 107.5 Music Awards	2021	The Vowels They Orbit	Wish Breakthrough Artist of the Year	Nominated	

== Discography ==
=== Extended plays ===
List of extended plays with selected details
Title	EP Details
Ang Unang Ikot	Released: July 17, 2021 (PH); Label: Sony Music Philippines; Format: Digital download, Streaming media
tuloy tuloy tuloy!	Released: March 10, 2023 (PH); Label: Sony Music Philippines; Format: Digital download, Streaming media

=== Singles ===
List of singles, showing year released and album name
Title	Year	Album	Ref(s)
"Selos"	2019	Ang Unang Ikot (EP)	
"Kiliti"	2019	Ang Unang Ikot (EP)	
"Pasa"	2020	Ang Unang Ikot (EP)	
"Una"	2021	tuloy tuloy tuloy! (EP)	
"Here In My Arms"	2022	tuloy tuloy tuloy! (EP)	
"If You Come Back To Me"	2023	tuloy tuloy tuloy! (EP)	
"Sandali"	2023	tuloy tuloy tuloy! (EP)	
