= Clara Benin discography =

- Studio albums: 2
- EPs: 3
- Singles: 17
- Music videos: 8
- Promotional singles: 4

Filipina singer and songwriter Clara Benin has released two studio albums, three extended plays (EPs), seventeen singles and eight music videos.

== Albums ==
=== Studio albums ===
| Title | Details | Notes |
|---|---|---|
| Human Eyes | Released: March 7, 2015 (PH); Label: Sonic Boom, Loudbox; Formats: CD, digital download, streaming | |
| Befriending My Tears | Released: August 11, 2023 (PH); Label: Offmute; Formats: CD, digital download, streaming | |

== Extended plays ==
| Title | Details | Notes |
|---|---|---|
| Riverchild | Released: November 26, 2015 (PH); Label: Sonic Boom, Loudbox; Formats: CD, digital download, streaming | |
| I Rose Up Slowly | Released: October 11, 2019 (PH); Label: Formats: CD, digital download, streaming | |
| Fragments | Released: November 27, 2020 (PH); Label: Sony Music Philippines; Formats: Digital download, streaming | Fragments track listing: No. / Title / Writer(s) / Length; 1. / "fragments" / Benin / 1:27; 2. / "Wine" (featuring Charlie Lim) / Benin / 5:43; 3. / "Sweet Nothings" / Benin / 3:39; 4. / "Araw't Gabi" / Benin / 4:44; 5. / "Wine" / Benin / 5:50; Total length: / / / 21:23 |

== Singles ==
=== As lead artist ===
List of singles where Clara Benin is lead artist
| Title | Year | Album | Ref. |
|---|---|---|---|
| "Riverchild" | 2015 | Riverchild | |
| "Parallel Universe" | 2017 | Non-album singles | |
| "Team" (Note: Cover version of the song by Lorde) | 2019 | Non-album singles | |
| "It's Okay" | 2020 | Non-album singles | |
| "Wine" | 2020 | Fragments | |
| "Araw't Gabi" | 2020 | Fragments | |
| "Suara Hati" (Note: Indonesian version of her cover of the song by Side A) | 2021 | Non-album single | |
| "blink" | 2021 | Befriending My Tears | |
| "affable dork" | 2022 | Befriending My Tears | |
| "different..." | 2023 | Befriending My Tears | |
| "small town" | 2023 | Befriending My Tears | |
| "keep still" | 2023 | Befriending My Tears | |
| "Can't Wait To See You On Christmas Day" | 2023 | Non-album single | |
| "hiding in the bathroom" | 2024 | Befriending My Tears | |
| "muscle memory" | 2026 | Non-album singles | |
| "the one to blame" | 2026 | Non-album singles | |
| "cinnamon coffee" | 2026 | Non-album singles | |

=== As featured artist ===
List of singles where Clara Benin is featured artist
| Title | Year | Album | Main artist | Ref. |
|---|---|---|---|---|
| "Some Kind of Magic" | 2015 | Non-album singles | Asch | |
| "Here Comes The Feeling" | 2016 | Non-album singles | Ryoku | |
| "Fallin" | 2016 | December Avenue | December Avenue | |
| "Plastic Bag" | 2016 | Non-album single | Dane Hipolito | |
| "No Greater Love" | 2016 | Life Of A Champion | Quest | |
| "Right Time" | 2016 | Salubungan | Johnoy Danao | |
| "Sailing" | 2017 | Non-album single | CRWN | |
| "Aliens" | 2017 | Colors | Ryoku | |
| "Puno" | 2018 | Here Today | Coeli | |
| "Do It All" | 2019 | Troubadour Tales Chapter 2 | Johnoy Danao | |
| "Different Kind of Love" | 2019 | Non-album single | Amadeo | |
| "Solomon" | 2019 | Kulayan Natin | Munimuni | |
| "Umami" | 2020 | Umami | Asch | |
| "A Day At A Time" | 2021 | Gentle Bones | Gentle Bones | |
| "Closer Than Before" | 2021 | The Lunchtime Special | Lola Amour | |
| "Stasis" | 2022 | Glasshouse 1 | Lowswimmer | |
| "Slowdown" | 2022 | Glasshouse 2 | Lowswimmer | |
| "Reflection" | 2023 | Non-album single | Ichika Nito | |
| "Telepono" | 2025 | Telepono | ONE CLICK STRAIGHT | |
| "roses" | 2025 | the world is so small (after all) | Paolo Sandejas | |
| "Lipgloss" | 2026 | Pour My Heart Out | Ivoris | |

=== Promotional singles ===
List of promotional singles by Clara Benin
| Title | Year | Album | Ref. |
|---|---|---|---|
| "Kung Akin Ang Langit" (with Mcoy Fundales) | 2014 | Philpop 2014: Loud & Proud | |
| "Do You Wanna Be Free" (with Bea Lorenzo and Janine Teñoso) | 2019 | Non-album singles | |
| "Di Na Muli" (a cover from Itchyworms, with Bea Lorenzo and Ben&Ben) | 2019 | Non-album singles | |
| "Awit ng Bagong Taon" (with Quest, Jireh Lim, SUD, Barbie Almalbis, EJ De Perio, Leanne & Naara, Reese Lansangan, Keiko Necesario, Pochoy Labog, Lola Amour and Magnus Haven) | 2020 | Non-album singles | |
