= Munimuni discography =

- Studio albums: 1
- EPs: 2
- Singles: 7

Filipino indie folk band Munimuni has released one studio album, one extended play (EPs) and four singles. The band consists of AJ Jiao on lead vocals and guitar, TJ de Ocampo on lead guitar, John Owen Castro on flute and background vocals, Jolo Ferrer on bass, and Josh Tumaliuan on drums.

== Albums ==
=== Studio albums ===
Kulayan Natin
- Released: July 26, 2019 (PH)
- Label: Marilag Records and Productions
- Formats: CD, digital download, streaming

No.	Title	Writer(s)	Length
1.	"Simula"	de Ocampo	6:46
2.	"Bakunawa"	Jiao	3:05
3.	"Oras" (Remastered)	Jiao	5:21
4.	"Bahay na Puti"	de Ocampo	5:19
5.	"Tahanan" (Remastered)	Castro	4:13
6.	"Solomon" (featuring Clara Benin)	de Ocampo	6:18
7.	"Pagsibol"	Castro	7:00
8.	"Bawat Piyesa"	de Ocampo	6:26
9.	"Kalachuchi" (Remastered)	de Ocampo	7:12
10.	"Banaag"	de Ocampo	5:56
11.	"Kulayan Natin"	Jiao	10:14
Total length:			67:42

== Extended plays ==
Simula (EP)
- Released: March 17, 2017 (PH)
- Label: Marilag Records and Productions
- Formats: CD, digital download, streaming

No.	Title	Writer(s)	Length
1.	"Bukang-Liwayway"	Jiao	4:20
2.	"Tanikala"	Jiao	3:42
3.	"Sa Pag-alala"	de Ocampo	0:57
4.	"Sa Hindi Pag-alala"	de Ocampo	4:08
5.	"Sa'yo"	de Ocampo	5:52
6.	"Marilag"	Jiao, de Ocampo	4:34
Total length:			23:33

== Singles ==
List of singles, showing year released and album name
Title	Year	Album	References
"Tahanan"	2018	Kulayan Natin	
"Oras"	2018	Kulayan Natin	
"Kalachuchi"	2018	Kulayan Natin	
"Minsan"	2019	Pop Machine	
"Kasama Kita"	2020	mga kantang isinulat mag-isa	
"Tinig"	2020	mga kantang isinulat mag-isa	
"Nawa"	2020	mga kantang isinulat mag-isa	

== Covers ==
List of covers, showing year released and album name
Title	Year	Album	References
"Minsan" (a cover from Eraserheads)	2019	Pop Machine	
