= Shirebound =

Filipino indie folk band

- Also known as: Shirebound & Busking
- Origin: Philippines
- Genres: Indie folk; folk pop
- Years active: 2016–present
- Members: Iego Tan

Shirebound (stylized in lowercase; formerly Shirebound & Busking) is a Filipino indie folk band and music project founded by singer-songwriter Iego Tan. Originally established as a solo project under the name Shirebound & Busking, it later evolved into a full band and adopted the shortened name Shirebound.

The project is known for the song "Waltz of Four Left Feet", first released in 2016 and later included in Tan's debut album For Princesses, By Thieves (O Mga Awit Ng Hiraya Para Sa Guni-guning Sinta), released in 2019. The song later entered the Philippines Hot 100, becoming the act's first chart entry.

As a band, Shirebound later released songs including "Hingalo", "sayo lang", "sa ating pag ibig", and "Pahintulot", the latter becoming their second entry on the chart.

== History ==
Iego Tan started Shirebound & Busking in 2016 as a solo project. The name was taken from The Shire from the works of J. R. R. Tolkien. Tan said the name came from feeling like "a displaced Hobbit". The word "Busking" was added because of his admiration for Irish musician Glen Hansard. Tan also tried busking while studying at the University of the Philippines. The project released the single "Waltz of Four Left Feet" in 2016. Other releases followed, including "A Million Little Things", "Dalum At Hibas", and "Aninipot", a collaboration with Bea Lorenzo.

In 2019, Shirebound & Busking released the album For Princesses, By Thieves (O Mga Awit Ng Hiraya Para Sa Guni-guning Sinta) and the EP Lumpin. Tan returned in 2022 with "Power And Sleep", his first release since Lumpin. The project later became a full band and shortened its name to Shirebound.

In 2025, the group collaborated with Jan Roberts on the song "Hingalo". In November, the band released "sayo lang". Billboard Philippines described it as the band's "first single together". The release was accompanied by the SHIRENANIGANS: sayo lang Single Launch event at 123 Block in Mandaluyong. "Waltz of Four Left Feet" later entered the Philippines Hot 100 at number 52 after gaining attention online. The band performed "Waltz of Four Left Feet" on the Wish 107.5 Bus.

In 2026, Shirebound released "sa ating pag ibig". The release was followed by the Waltz Sa Ating Pag-Ibig launch event at 123 Block featuring performances from The Itchyworms, TONEEJAY, SUYEN, Syd Hartha, Project Yazz, and Revisors. The same year, the band's collaboration with Jan Roberts, "Pahintulot", later entered the Philippines Hot 100, becoming the band's second chart entry.

== Musical style ==
Shirebound's music has been described as indie folk. Many of Tan's songs focus on romance, longing, and nature. Tan has cited Glen Hansard as an influence.

== Discography ==
=== Studio albums ===
- For Princesses, By Thieves (O Mga Awit Ng Hiraya Para Sa Guni-guning Sinta) (2019)

=== EPs ===
- Lumpin (2019)

=== Singles ===
- "Waltz of Four Left Feet" (2016)
- "A Million Little Things"
- "Dalum At Hibas"
- "Aninipot" (with Bea Lorenzo)
- "Power And Sleep" (2022)
- "Hingalo" (with Jan Roberts) (2025)
- "sayo lang" (2025)
- "sa ating pag ibig" (2026)
- "Pahintulot" (featuring Jan Roberts) (2026)

== Accolades ==
Award	Year	Category	Recipient(s)	Result	Ref.
Wish Music Awards	2026	Wishclusive Contemporary Folk Performance of the Year	"Waltz of Four Left Feet"	Nominated	
Wish Music Awards	2026	Wishclusive Collaboration of the Year	"Pahintulot" featuring Jan Roberts	Nominated	
