= Jerms =

Filipino musician

- Also known as: Jerms
- Born: Jermaine Lois Choa Peck
- Genre: Indie folk
- Occupations: Singer; songwriter; musician; environmental advocate; actor
- Instruments: Vocals; percussion
- Years active: 2013–present
- Member of: The Ransom Collective

Jermaine Lois Choa Peck, known professionally as Jerms, is a Filipino musician, singer-songwriter, and environmental advocate. She is the co-vocalist and percussionist of the indie folk band the Ransom Collective.

In 2024, Peck began her solo career as independent artist with the release of her debut single "Alay sa Gabay", followed by the extended play (EP) Hiraya Manawari (2025). She participated in environmental initiatives, including plastic reduction and reforestation projects in the Philippines.

== Early life ==
Peck graduated with a degree in Speech Communication from the University of the Philippines Diliman's College of Arts and Letters. She also played as a goalkeeper for the university's women's football team.

== Music career ==
=== The Ransom Collective ===
Peck became a member of the Ransom Collective after being introduced to its founding members through a mutual acquaintance. The group entered a competition connected to the Wanderland Music and Arts Festival and won first place, earning a performance at the festival. She is one of the vocalist and percussionist of the band. The group also includes Kian Ransom, Leah Halili, Muriel Gonzales, Redd Claudio, and Lily Gonzales.

The band released its self-titled extended play in 2014 and its debut album Traces in 2017. Its songs include "Fools", "Settled", and "Open Road". The band's members have also pursued solo projects. Bassist Leah Halili released solo music, including "Fourth of July", while siblings Muriel Gonzales and Lily Gonzales and other members also pursued solo projects.

In 2026, the band released "Tongue Tied", its first new single in nearly four years following "3 AM" in 2022. The release marked the band's return to releasing original music after a period of reduced activity while its members worked on individual projects.

=== Solo career ===
Peck began releasing solo music in 2024 under the name Jerms. On November 22, she released her debut single "Alay sa Gabay". The song was inspired by her experiences living and working on a farm in Zambales with her friends. It was the first of a planned series of releases leading to her debut EP and was produced by Kashira. The song's music video was filmed in Zambales with cinematographer Susan Larsson. Peck developed the concept while traveling in Indonesia and wanted to feature natural landscapes in the video. In an interview with The Beat Manila, she explained that her solo work allowed her to explore her musical identity outside the band.

On April 16, 2025, Peck released "Tahan Na", a single about finding comfort during difficult times. She said the song took on a personal meaning following her father's death. It was released ahead of her debut EP Hiraya Manawari, which came out on May 15, 2025.

In May 2026, Peck marked the anniversary of Hiraya Manawari with the release of the music video for "Party Gubat". The project was made in collaboration with Forest Foundation Philippines, with direction by Paolo Moreno and production support from Antevasin Digital.

== Advocacy ==
Peck has participated in environmental initiatives alongside her music career. These include The Plastic Solution and Tribes and Treks, a reforestation project in Zambales. Her involvement with The Circle Hostel helped introduce her to environmental work and collaborations with local communities and organizations. Peck's work also included collaboration with the Sambali Foundation. She has incorporated her interest in nature and conservation into her solo music, including "Alay sa Gabay" and the "Party Gubat" music video.

== Discography ==
=== Extended plays ===
- Hiraya Manawari (2025)

=== Selected singles ===
- "Alay sa Gabay" (2024)
- "Tahan Na" (2025)
- "Amarte" (2025)
- "far from home" (2025)
- "Hiwaga" (2025)
