= Kai Honasan =

Filipino singer-songwriter

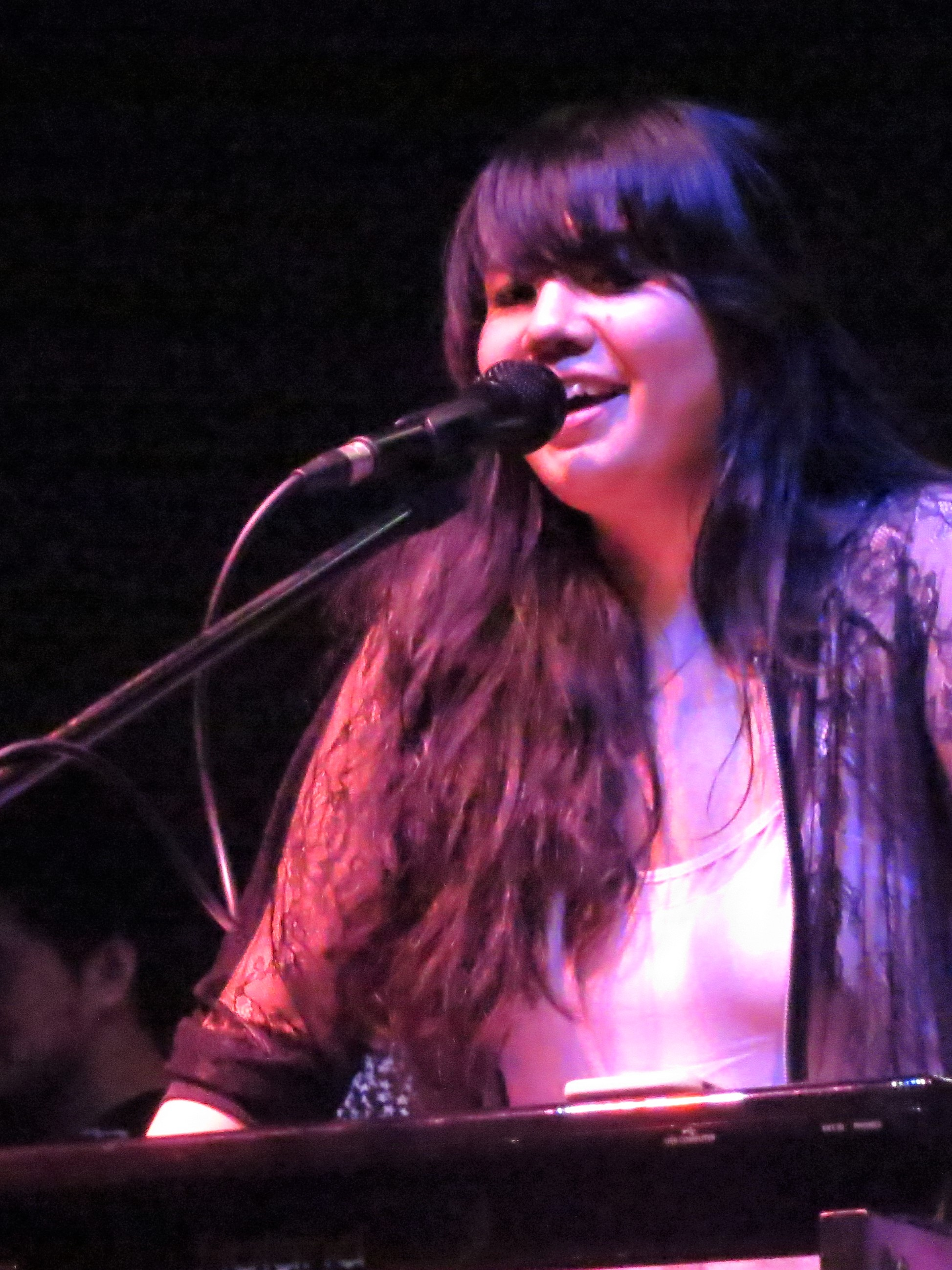
- Kai Honasan performing alongside Reese Lansangan at a gig at Century City Mall, Makati on 17 June 2016

Background information
- Born: Klarisa Rosario Umali Honasan
- Instruments: Ukulele; piano; kazoo
- Years active: 2011–present

Klarisa Rosario Honasan-del Rio, better known as Kai Honasan, is a Filipino independent singer-songwriter best known for quirky, lighthearted ukulele-driven songs, receiving critical acclaim for her first album, "In Your Face", and achieving popular acclaim in the Philippine independent music scene for her live performances. She is married to Eco Del Rio, bassist for Chicosci (a punk Filipino band)

== Early life and musical exposure ==
Raised in a family of artists - including brothers Karel Honasan, a bassist; Martin Honasan, a painter; and later, sister-in-law Barbie Almalbis-Honasan, a popular musician - Kai Honasan first started playing the piano at age 4, and started writing music in her grade school years.

Aside from the Honasan siblings' forays into the arts, the Honasan family is very familiar to the Filipino public, since their father is Philippine Senator Gringo Honasan.

== Formal musical training and early work ==
Taking off from her early exposure to music Honasan studied piano and received a degree in classical music.

She performed at her first professional gig in 2011, fronting for sister-in-law Barbie Almalbis Honasan. Barbie had been a strong musical influence for Kai even before Barbie married Kai's brother Martin, and encouraged Kai to perform her own music. That year, she also attended a songwriting workshop at Berklee College of Music in Valencia, Spain.

In 2012, she was accepted into the Philippines' highly esteemed Elements National Music Camp, where she was mentored by the likes of Ryan Cayabyab, Joey Ayala and Noel Cabangon, among others.

In 2013, she wrote the song "Liwanag" for the ballet "Rock Supremo", which was a collaboration between Ballet Philippines and Rock Ed Philippines. The album's roster featured 11 well established acts, including Ebe Dancel and Radioactive Sago Project.

== "In Your Face (and other songs about other faces)", 2014 ==
In November 2013, Honasan began working with musicians Buddy Zabala and Sancho Sanchez, and sound engineer Shinji Tanaka to turn eight of Honasan's songs into an album. The final product, “In Your Face (and other songs about other faces)” was launched on March 22, 2014 at B-Side, The Collective in Makati.

== The Voice ==
Honasan is also known for having once been a contestant on The Voice of the Philippines.

== Autotelic ==
In addition to her work as a solo artist, Honasan joined pop rock band Autotelic in May 2014, filling in after the departure of Keyboardist Eric Tubon.
