= Muri (musician) =

Filipino musical artist

- Also known as: Muri
- Born: Muriel Gonzales
- Genres: Neo-soul; indie pop; indie folk
- Occupations: Singer-songwriter; musician
- Instruments: Vocals; violin
- Years active: 2013–present
- Label: Warner
- Member of: The Ransom Collective

Muriel Gonzales, known professionally as Muri, is a Filipino singer-songwriter and violinist. She is a member of the indie folk band the Ransom Collective and has also released music as a solo artist. Her sister Lily Gonzales, also serves as the band's keyboardist.

Based in Manila and London, Gonzales released her debut solo single "Thunder" (2021). She received nominations at the Awit Awards and the Wishclusive Music Awards. In 2025, she represented the Philippines at South by Southwest and performed at Bangkok Music City and AXEAN Music Festival. In 2026, she performed at Focus Wales as the Philippines' sole representative. Gonzales' music combines neo-soul and indie pop, with violin arrangements.

== Career ==
Gonzales began playing the violin in fourth grade. During college, she performed at gigs and worked as a session musician for artists including Bullet Dumas, Kjwan, and Similarobjects. She is based in Manila and London.

=== The Ransom Collective ===
Gonzales became a member of the Ransom Collective after being introduced to its founding members through a mutual acquaintance. The group entered a competition connected to the Wanderland Music and Arts Festival and won first place, earning a performance at the festival. Gonzales plays violin in the band, which also includes vocalist Kian Ransom, keyboardist Lily Gonzales, drummer Redd Claudio, bassist Leah Halili, and percussionist Jermaine Choa Peck. The band released its self-titled extended play in 2014 and its debut album Traces in 2017. Its songs include "Settled", "Tides", and "Something Better".

Gonzales and her bandmates later pursued solo projects while continuing to reunite for performances and new releases. In 2026, the band released "Tongue Tied", originally written in 2019 and revisited by the group after being shelved during the COVID-19 pandemic. The song features vocals from Ransom and Gonzales, alongside violin and xylophone arrangements.

The band's bassist Leah Halili, also pursued a solo career, releasing "Fourth of July" as her solo debut. Gonzales' sister Lily Gonzales (under her solo work's name Lili), who plays keyboards in the group, also released solo music.

=== Solo career ===
In 2021, Gonzales released "Thunder", her debut solo single. She wrote the song and recorded it with drummer Pat Sarabia of Oh! Flamingo and keyboardist RJ Pineda of Riot Logic. The song was produced by Allan Dela Merced, who performs as LUSTBASS. It was announced as the first of four planned singles for an upcoming solo extended play.

In 2022, she released "Letters", and received nominations at the 35th Awit Awards and the Wishclusive Music Awards. Her collaboration with LUSTBASS on a remix of "Thunder" was also nominated for Best Remix Recording at the 36th Awit Awards.

On June 7, 2024, Gonzales released "Afternoon", a single inspired by her personal and professional experiences while living in London and Paris. The song was released ahead of her debut solo extended play 11ème, which was produced in France. In July, Gonzales released "Rêve-toi".

In 2025, Gonzales represented the Philippines at South by Southwest, followed by performances at Bangkok Music City and AXEAN Music Festival. She also performed at Focus Wales as the Philippines' sole representative. Her set featured her violin playing and songs from her solo repertoire.

== Discography ==
=== Extended plays ===
- 11ème (2024)

=== Singles ===
- "Thunder" (2021) (LUSTBASS remix; 2022)
- "Letters" (2022)
- "Afternoon" (2024)
- "Rêve-toi" (2024)

== Awards and nominations ==
Year	Award-giving body	Category	Nominated work	Result
2022	Awit Awards	Favorite Female Artist	Muriel Gonzales	Nominated
	Wishclusive Music Awards	Wishclusive Contemporary R&B Performance	"Letters"	Nominated
2023	Awit Awards	Best Remix Recording	"Thunder" (LUSTBASS remix)	Nominated
