= The Ransom Collective =

Filipino indie folk band

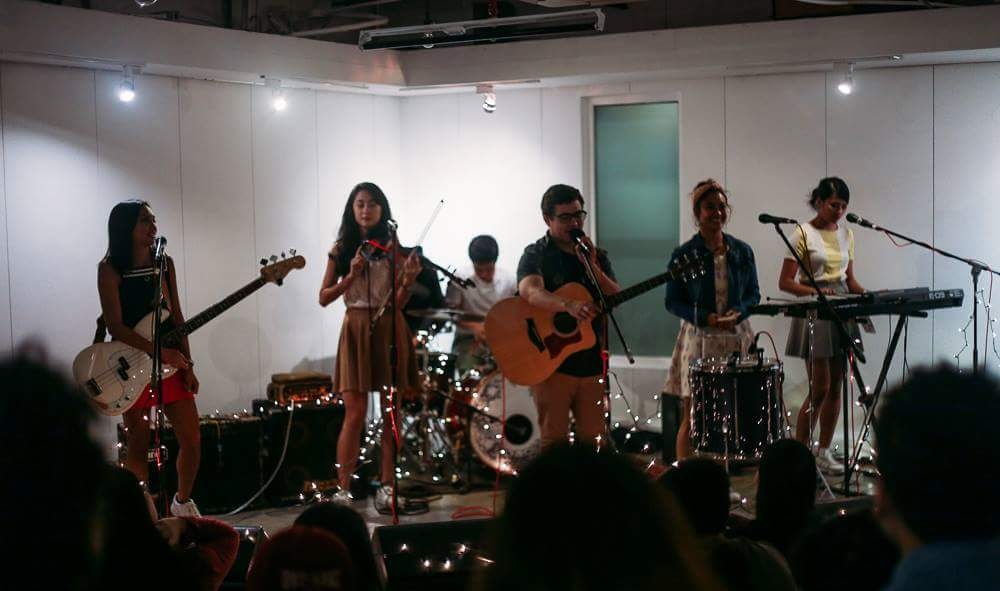
- The Ransom Collective performing at A Space, Greenbelt, Makati in 2016. Left to right: Leah Halili, Muriel Gonzales, Redd Claudio, Kian Ransom, Jermaine Choa Peck, Lily Gonzales.

Background information
- Also known as: TRC, Kian Ransom
- Origin: Manila, Philippines
- Genres: Indie folk; Folk pop
- Years active: 2013–present
- Labels: Universal; Mustard Music
- Members: Kian Ransom; Jermaine Choa Peck; Lily Gonzales; Muriel Gonzales; Leah Halili; Redd Claudio
- Past members: Hunny Lee
- Website: theransomcollective.com

The Ransom Collective (also known as TRC and originally known as Kian Ransom) are a Filipino indie folk band known for their "spirited music that makes for perfect adventure tunes."

The band, which consists of Kian Ransom (vocals/guitars), Jermaine Choa Peck (vocals/percussion), Leah Halili (vocals/bass), sisters Lily (keyboards) and Muriel Gonzales (violin), and Redd Claudio (drums), first received wide public attention when they won first place at Wanderland Music and Arts Festival's pre-event Wanderband competition in January 2014 and played at Wanderland 2014. The group is currently signed to Mustard Music, a sub-label of Universal Records.

The band released their self-titled EP in 2014, featuring hit singles "Fools", "Settled", and "Open Road". They also released their debut album Traces on May 20, 2017.

== History ==
TRC was formed in August 2013 when Kian Ransom, then an indie solo artist, came back to the Philippines after pursuing his college education in Los Angeles. He joined his high school friend Hunny Lee (the first drummer) and would later be joined by Fine Arts students from U.P. Diliman, namely Jermaine Choa Peck and the Gonzales sisters (Lily and Muriel). Leah Halili, Peck's course mate, was later invited to join. The band was named after Ransom himself. Later, Lee left the band and returned to South Korea for his military service duties. Afterwards, Lee was replaced by Redd Claudio (a friend of Halili's brother) as their permanent drummer.

TRC's first big break was joining the Wanderland's pre-event band competition Wanderband, which they won in first place in the finals last January 2014. Their first major gig was at the Wanderland Music and Arts Festival 2014, joining the likes of local and international acts. They released their self-titled EP last September 2014, which featured their debut single Fools.

In 2015, TRC joined the likes of fellow indie acts such as BP Valenzuela, Bullet Dumas, Cheats, MOONWLK and others as part of the collaborated LP vinyl album Fresh Filter Vol. 1 released by Jam 88.3 and Satchmi.

On May 20, 2017, the band released their debut album Traces which featured the singles Settled and Open Road.

== Music influences ==
The Ransom Collective cite as musical influences Mumford & Sons, The Lumineers and Local Natives.

== Members ==
=== Current ===
- Kian Ransom – vocals, guitars (2013–present)
- Jermaine Choa Peck – vocals, percussion (2013–present)
- Leah Halili – vocals, bass guitars (2013–present)
- Lily Gonzales – keyboards (2013–present)
- Muriel Gonzales – violin (2013–present)
- Redd Claudio – drums (2013–present)

=== Former ===
- Hunny Lee – drums (2013)

== Discography ==
=== Studio albums ===
- Traces (2017)

=== EPs ===
- The Ransom Collective (2014)

=== Singles ===
| Year | Song | Album/EP |
|---|---|---|
| 2014 | "Fools" | The Ransom Collective (EP) |
| 2014 | "Run" | The Ransom Collective (EP) |
| 2016/2017 | "Settled" | Traces (album) |
| 2016/2017 | "Open Road" | Traces (album) |
| 2017 | "Tides" | Traces (album) |
| 2019 | "I Don't Care" | (Non-album singles) |
| 2022 | "3 A.M." | (Non-album singles) |

=== Compilation albums ===
- Fresh Filter: Volume 1 (vinyl, LP) (2015)

=== Collaborated singles ===
- "Wonderfilled" (feat. Yuna and GAC) – Oreo Asia
- "Caution To The Wind" (with Gab & John of Urbandub) – Coke Studio Philippines

=== Music videos ===
| Year | Song | Director |
|---|---|---|
| 2015 | "Fools" | Sarie Cruz |
| 2016 | "Settled" | Hunny Lee |
| 2016 | "Wonderfilled" | Carat Content |
| 2016 | "Open Road" | Simon Te |

=== Music competitions ===
- Wanderband (2014) – First Placer
- Deezer "Young Guns" (2014) – Second Placer
- Spotify Emerge Philippines (2015)
