= Leah Halili =

Filipino singer-songwriter

- Born: Leah Anne Mesina Halili
- Genres: Indie folk; folk pop; indie pop
- Occupations: Singer-songwriter; musician
- Instruments: Vocals; bass guitar; ukulele
- Years active: 2013–present
- Member of: The Ransom Collective
- Spouse: Nikee Bañares

Leah Anne Mesina Halili is a Filipino singer-songwriter and musician known as the bassist and vocalist of the indie folk band the Ransom Collective, which formed in 2013. She began releasing independent music as a solo artist in 2021 with the debut single "Fourth of July".

== Career ==
=== The Ransom Collective ===
Halili is the bassist and vocalist of the Ransom Collective, a Filipino indie-folk band formed in 2013. The band was won at the Wanderband competition in 2014 and performing at the Wanderland Music and Arts Festival that year. Its members include Kian Ransom, Jermaine Choa Peck, Lily Gonzales, Muriel Gonzales, Redd Claudio, and Halili. In 2017, The Philippine Star featured Halili and her bandmates in an article about the group's independent approach to music and its growing audience.

In 2026, the band released "Tongue Tied", its first new single in nearly four years following "3 AM", which was released in October 2022. In the years between releases, the band members pursued solo projects, including Halili's solo career.

=== Solo career ===
On July 5, 2021, Halili released her debut single "Fourth of July". The song was recorded by producer Carlos Castaño with Pat Sarabia on drums, John Apura on guitar, and Princess Ybañez on strings. It marked her first release as a solo artist outside her work with The Ransom Collective.

In an interview with BusinessMirror, Halili discussed how the COVID-19 pandemic affected her approach to making music. She described her solo work as "more personal than her work with the band". The lyrics of "Fourth of July" were inspired by an instant connection in a long-distance relationship and a line from the 2001 comedy film Legally Blonde.

On February 9, 2023, Halili performed on Rappler Live Jam, an online music performance series by the news website Rappler.

In January 2024, Halili released "Change", a song about her experiences with anxiety and fear. Produced by Nick Lazaro, the track combines guitar lines with electronic elements. She also organized a performance at Jess and Pat's in Quezon City on January 12, 2024, which marked her debut performance as a solo artist. On July 19, Halili released "River by the Sea". The folk-pop single was produced by Francis Lorenzo, with her partner Nikee Bañares contributing to its songwriting and guitar arrangement. Halili said she was planning a six-track extended play, which she intended to release after remastering her singles and finding a common concept for the project. On November 7, she released "When the Day Ends", following "Change" and "River by the Sea".

Halili later collaborated with The Ransom Collective bandmates Lily and Muriel Gonzales on "Clear to Me", a pop song produced by Carlos Castaño and inspired by her relationship with Bañares. In September 2026, Halili collaborated with the sibling duo Ysanygo on the single "Magical Heart", released through Underdog Music. The collaboration followed her return to recording with The Ransom Collective earlier that year for "Tongue Tied".

== Personal life ==
Halili was based in California and worked as a teacher while pursuing her music career. She is married to musician Nikee Bañares.

== Discography ==
=== As solo artist ===
List of singles as solo artist and showing year released
Title	Year	PHL
"Fourth of July"	2021	—
"Change"	2024	—
"River by the Sea"	2024	—
"When the Day Ends"	2024	—
"—" denotes releases that did not chart or were not released in that region.

=== Collaborations ===
List of collaborative singles
Title	Year	PHL	Artist(s)
"Clear to Me"	2022	—	Leah Halili, Lily Gonzales and Muriel Gonzales
"Magical Heart"	2026	—	Leah Halili and Ysanygo
"—" denotes releases that did not chart or were not released in that region.
