= Elements Music Camp =

The Elements Music Camp (sometimes referred to as the Elements National Music Camp or the Elements National Singer-Songwriter Camp) is a music masterclass for Filipino singer-songwriters, notable for the participation of eminent music personalities from the Philippines such as Ryan Cayabyab, Joey Ayala, and Gary Granada, among others. It is also notable for having helped the careers of numerous young Filipino Musicians, including Bullet Dumas, musical duo Reese and Vica, Josh Villena & Kai Honasan of Autotelic, Clara Benin, Kat Agarrado, Paolo & Miguel Guico, Poch Barretto, & Andrew de Pano of Ben & Ben, Moira dela Torre, Thyro and Yumi, Sitti, among others.

== History ==
The Elements Music Camp is a project of 7101 Music Nation, an organization under the Tao Corporation community of companies. It was formed by Tao Corp.’s president, Julio D. Sy Jr., and music industry veterans Maestro Ryan Cayabyab and Twinky Lagdameo in 2010.

The aim of the Camp—which has trained some of the music business’ best and brightest in recent years—is to gather aspiring and professional singers and songwriters from all over the country and provide them with a venue to learn, collaborate, interact and create music in a natural setting.

From 2010-2014 the camp took place in Bahura Resort, Dauin, Dumaguete City and in 2015, due to the closure of flights for the ASEAN Meeting, was relocated at Kuh Ledesma's Haciena Isabela.

== Notable Mentors ==
Notable musical mentors:

Ogie Alcasid, Gabby Alipe of Urbandub, Jimmy Antiporda, Joey Ayala, Trina Belamide, Joey Benin, Rico Blanco, Ely Buendia, Noel Cabangon, Yeng Constantino, Jay Contreras of Kamikazee, Ebe Dancel, Aia de Leon, Jay Durias of South Border, Audie Gemora, Gary Granada, Gloc-9, Jonathan Manalo, Raymund Marasigan, Jungee Marcelo, Armi Millare of UDD, Chito Miranda of Parokya ni Edgar, Jazz Nicolas of Itchyworms, Louie Ocampo, Jim Paredes, Gerard Salonga, Aiza Seguerra, Top Suzara, Gary Valenciano, Rey Valera, Mike Villegas, Quest, Nyoy Volante, and Yael Yuzon of Spongecola.

Notable music business / production mentors:

Annabel Regalado-Borja, JV Colayco, Quark Henares, Angee Rozul, Ricky Ilacad, Christina Luna, Dean Sunico, and Angelia Valenciano,

Notable vocal production mentors:

Emmy Cayabyab, Clarissa Ocampo, Lemuel Dela Cruz, Dulce, Jed Madela, and Jett Pangan.

Guest Speakers:

John Lee (Tom Lee Music), Jonathan Serbin (Billboard), James Koo (Youtube), and Mike Baldo (Orchard Music)
