= Reese and Vica =

Filipino indie-pop duo

- Genres: Indie pop
- Years active: 2009–present
- Members: Reese Lansangan; Vica Hernandez

Reese and Vica is a Filipino indie-pop duo formed in 2009, composed of Reese Lansangan and Vica Hernandez. Although Lansangan and Hernandez also perform separately, together they are best known for guitar-driven songs characterized by blended vocals and whimsical storytelling. Both musicians are singer-songwriters and play guitar.

The duo met while they were still in college, through the Ateneo Musicians' Pool, a student organization at the Ateneo de Manila University. Deciding to perform as a duo, they released their first EP, "Crossing Neverland," in 2010. This led to the band winning College Band of the Year at the final NU107 Rock Awards, that same year.

In 2012, they collaborated with another duo, "Gab and Josh" (Gab Cabangon and Joshua “J-Blay” Blay) on the track "Pagbabalik" for Rock Rizal, Rock Ed Philippines' tribute album on the occasion of the 150th Birthday of Philippine national hero, Jose Rizal.

Both Lansangan and Hernandez participated the Philippines' highly esteemed Elements National Music Camp in 2013 - the same batch as Clara Benin and Sitti. Here, they were mentored by Ryan Cayabyab, Joey Ayala and Noel Cabangon, among others.

Reese and Vica released their second EP, “Those Who Wander,” in December 2014.
