= Syd Hartha =

Filipino singer-songwriter (born 2001)

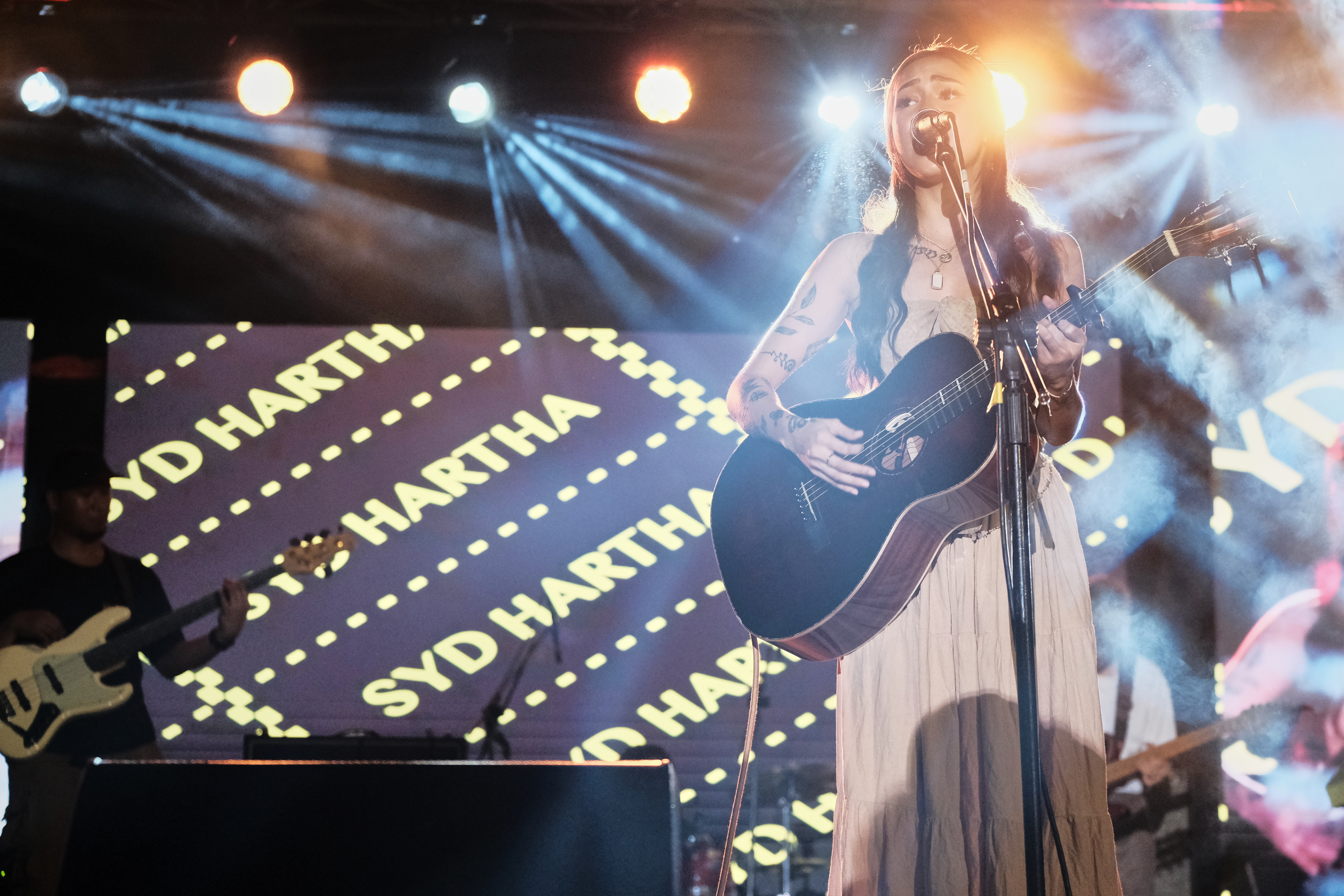
- del Rosario in 2024

Background information
- Born: Sonia del Rosario; October 31, 2001 (age 25); Manila, Philippines
- Genres: Indie; pop-folk; acoustic
- Occupations: Musician; singer; songwriter
- Instruments: Vocals; guitar
- Years active: 2017–present
- Label: Sony Music Philippines
- Website: www.sonymusic.com.ph/artist/syd-hartha/

Sonia del Rosario (born October 31, 2001), known professionally as Syd Hartha (stylized in lowercase), is a Filipino singer-songwriter. She released her debut extended play (EP) Gabay, released on March 22, 2023, which features the tracks "Kung Nag-aatubili" (If You're Reluctant) and "3:15" with rapper kiyo. del Rosario is currently signed under Sony Music Philippines.

== Early life ==
Sonia del Rosario was born on October 31, 2001, in Manila, Philippines, to actress Barbara Ruaro and Eraserheads guitarist Marcus Adoro. Hartha began creating music at the age of 12, experimenting with various instruments despite having no formal training.

== Music career ==
In 2017, del Rosario began posting videos on YouTube, featuring song covers such as "Kiss Me" by Sixpence None The Richer, which was the first video she uploaded. In same year, she released her original tracks "Need You" (Kailangan Kita) and "Sa Dulo" (At the End). She released with her debut single "Paruparo" (Butterfly), and earned her a nomination for Best New Artist at the 2020 MYX Music Awards.

In 2018, del Rosario broke into the music scene with "Tila Tila" (Like a Star). She evolved into a songwriter unafraid to showcase "unguarded moments of vulnerability with captivating rawness" through tracks such as "Ayaw" (Don't Want), "Paruparo", and "Hiwaga" (Mystery).

In 2021, del Rosario was featured by Japanese music project Tokimeki Records released a cover of city pop-version "Carnival" by The Cardigans.

In 2022, del Rosario collaborated with former Munimuni vocalist TJ de Ocampo (known as stage name Toneejay) on his single "Bawat Piyesa (Secret Verse Version)".

In 2023, del Rosario released her debut extended play Gabay (Guide) under Sony Music Philippines, which explores her personal struggles and journey toward reclaiming her identity. The EP was produced by Brian Lotho. The recording of Gabay was initially scheduled for March 2020 but was delayed for three years due to the COVID-19 pandemic and personal challenges. The songs "Kung Nag-aatubili", "Pakay" (Purpose), and "3:15 (featuring kiyo)" were written by herself years ago during a dark period in her life, while the title track "Gabay" and "Lipad" (Fly) were composed during the pandemic.

In 2024, del Rosario released her new single "Panalangin" (Prayer), a cover of Apo Hiking Society's early 1980s hit. At the 37th Awit Awards, Gabay was nominated for Best Traditional Contemporary Folk Recording. She was part of the lineup for Globe Music Fest at Sinulog 2025, which also featured Denise Julia, Shoti, and Mandaue Nights.

== Artistry ==
=== Musical style and themes ===
del Rosario's music blends elements of folk and pop, often characterized by primarily acoustic instrumentation. Her debut EP Gabay, showcases this fusion, chronicling her pains, traumas, and musings as a young woman.

del Rosario known for her delicate vocals and lyrical complexity, often exploring themes of abuse, existentialism, and self-forgiveness. Her songs serve as a medium for expressing deeply personal experiences, many of which she admits she has yet to fully heal from. In an interview with Bandwagon Asia, she shared, "There are songs I wrote about experiences I honestly haven't completely healed from yet and struggle to talk about, but the fact that I'm not just doing all this for myself empowers me and makes me want to fight more."

=== Influences ===
del Rosario cites Lorde and Jhené Aiko as major influences on her music. Her music is rooted in the acoustic genre, influenced by her mother’s fondness for listening to Paramore during her childhood. She developed a passion for playing instruments, eventually learning to play the guitar and write songs. She has cited Original Pinoy Music (OPM) bands such as Spongecola and Parokya ni Edgar.

== Accolades ==
| Award | Year | Category | Recipient(s) | Result | Ref. |
|---|---|---|---|---|---|
| Myx Music Awards | 2020 | New Artist of the Year | syd hartha | Nominated | |
| 6th Wish 107.5 Music Awards | 2021 | Wishclusive Contemporary Folk Performance of the Year | "paruparo" | Nominated | |
| 8th Wish 107.5 Music Awards | 2023 | Wishclusive Contemporary Folk Performance of the Year | "kung nag-aatubili" | Nominated | |
| 37th Awit Awards | 2024 | Best Traditional Contemporary Folk Recording | "Gabay" | Won | |

== Discography ==
=== EPs ===
| Year | Title | Label |
|---|---|---|
| 2023 | Gabay | Sony Music |

=== Singles ===
List of singles, with year released and album/EPs name shown
| Title | Year | Album/EPs |
|---|---|---|
| "Tila-tila" | 2018 | — |
| "Iglap" | 2018 | — |
| "Paruparo" | 2019 | — |
| "Kung Nag-aatubili" | 2021 | Gabay |
| "Sana'y Di Nalang" | 2021 | — |
| "3:15" (with kiyo) | 2022 | Gabay |
| "Gabay" | 2023 | Gabay |
| "Panalangin" | 2024 | — |
| "Damdamin!" | 2024 | — |
