= Riverchild =

EP by Clara Benin
- Released: November 26, 2015
- Studio: Sonic Boom Studios (Taguig, Metro Manila)
- Genre: Indie; folk; acoustic
- Length: 18:53
- Label: Sonic Boom; Loudbox
- Producer: Clara Benin; Joey Benin; Alex Lim; Angee Rozul

Clara Benin chronology
Human Eyes (2015)	Riverchild (2015)	I Rose Up Slowly (2019)

Riverchild is the first extended play (EP) by Filipina singer Clara Benin. Its title comes from the fourth song of the release. The EP consists of five tracks, four original songs and 1 cover.

== Background ==
A few months after Human Eyes was released, Benin already started working on producing more music.

The "Riverchild" EP project serves as an advocacy campaign for bringing children to school. Proceeds will go to the Tapulanga Foundation, a non-profit charitable organization working to uplift the lives of those who were born with less through educational scholarships and healthcare assistance.

== Track listing ==
All songs were written by Benin except where noted.

Riverchild
No.	Title	Writer(s)	Length
1.	"December"		3:31
2.	"Smile"		4:18
3.	"Tila" (Side A cover)	Leevon Cailao	3:05
4.	"Riverchild"		4:58
5.	"I've Been Looking All over the Place for You"		3:01
Total length:			18:53
