= Jan Roberts =

Filipino singer-songwriter

- Born: Jan Roberts Baloloy
- Origin: Albay, Philippines
- Genres: Indie folk; acoustic; OPM
- Occupations: Singer; songwriter
- Instruments: Vocals; guitar
- Years active: 2020–present
- Label: Warner Music Philippines

Jan Roberts Baloloy is a Filipino singer-songwriter and guitarist from Albay. He started sharing his music during the COVID-19 pandemic through online busking on social media platforms. His 2024 single "Sagip" (transl. Save) charted on Spotify Philippines' Viral 100. He is currently signed under Warner Music Philippines.

== Early life and education ==
Roberts grew up in Marikina with his maternal grandparents as his mother had to work abroad. They later moved to Legazpi, Albay after his mother’s retirement. He comes from a family with a background in music and theatre. Roberts learned how to sing from his grandmother and was introduced to playing the guitar by his uncle. Karaoke sessions at home played a large role in his early exposure to music.

Roberts earned a Bachelor of Performing Arts (BPeA) majoring in Theater Arts, at Bicol University College of Arts and Letters. During his early recording career, he split his time between Bicol and Metro Manila to balance his studies with music-related work.

== Career ==
Roberts started writing songs in 2020 during the COVID-19 lockdowns. With live performances put on hold, he began busking online on platforms such as Discord and TikTok, which helped him gain a following. When restrictions were lifted, he moved into street busking and small live shows. He later met executives from Warner Music Philippines through a friend from the band Dilaw, who introduced him to the label.

Roberts made his official debut as a recording artist under Warner Music in 2022. His single "Sagip", reached number three on the Spotify Philippines Viral 100 chart and garnered millions of streams.

He later released songs including "Patlang" (transl. Space) and "Hirap Kalimutan" (transl. Hard to Forget). In 2024, "Sagip" had exceeded five million streams on Spotify. He performed "Sagip" on the Wish 107.5 Bus, and participated in Rappler's Live Jam sessions.

In 2025, Roberts collaborated with the folk band shirebound on the single "Hingalo" (transl. Gasping). He said the experience was meaningful, as shirebound had been an early influence on his musical style.

== Artistry ==
Roberts performs mainly acoustic music, often in the form of soothing and contemplative ballads. He is influenced by artists such as Bullet Dumas, Ebe Dancel, Gary Granada, and Johnoy Danao, and has said he would like to collaborate with Dilaw, Dwta, and Munimuni. Kyla Vivero of Pulp Magazine wrote that Roberts shows being a musician is not only about fame or success, but also about making songs that connect with listeners and reflect shared experiences.

== Discography ==
=== Singles ===
List of singles, showing year released
Title	Year	Ref.
"Binibini"	2022	
"Escolta"	2022	
"Patlang"	2023	
"Sagip"	2024	
"Hirap Kalimutan"	2024	
"U-Belt"	2025	
"Tanaw"	2025	
"Hingalo" (with shirebound)	2025	
