= Human Eyes =

Studio album by Clara Benin
- Released: March 7, 2015
- Studios: Sonic Boom Studios (Taguig, Metro Manila)
- Genres: Indie; folk; acoustic
- Length: 37:16
- Labels: Sonic Boom; Loudbox
- Producers: Clara Benin; Joey Benin; Alex Lim; Angee Rozul

Clara Benin chronology
Human Eyes (2015)	Riverchild EP (2015)

Singles from Human Eyes
- 1. "Easy" Released: January 23, 2013; 2. "Be My Thrill" Released: April 29, 2014; 3. "Dust" Released: January 23, 2015; 4. "Closure" Released: July 7, 2016; 5. "Kingdom Come" Released: January 3, 2017

Human Eyes is the debut studio album by Filipina singer Clara Benin. It was released in 2015 by Sonic Boom and Loudbox.

== Background ==
Benin enrolled in MINT College to study Music Business Management, where a video of her original composition “Closure” which was recorded and posted in 2012 became a college hit. She took time to soak in the creative environment the school had to offer, and where she would eventually find friends and eventually collaborators that would help develop her unique sound. She would also lend her distinctive voice to a commercial for a popular fastfood chain. She would play small gigs for school, and later hook up with independent music outfit Sonic Boom, and eventually expand her fan base to a bigger audience. She would then join Philpop 2014, where her collaboration with McCoy Fundales, would serve as a delicious sampling to the mainstream music market of the great music that was in the wings, waiting for the perfect time. Anticipation for her album release reached a fever pitch, with her haunting rendition of the theme for the independent film “Red.”

"Human Eyes" was recorded in three months at the Sonic Boom studio at MINT College and at Loudbox Studios. The album is self-produced, with the help of her father Joey Benin, indie music impresario Alex Lim, and veteran studio producer/engineer Angee Rozul for mixing and mastering duties.

"Human Eyes" was released on 7 March 2015 at 26th St. Bistro in BGC.

== Singles ==
The first single ("Easy") was released on 23 June 2013. During an interview, Benin said that she wrote "Easy" when she was 17 years old and it was inspired by the movie The Hunger Games.

The second single ("Be My Thrill") was released on 29 April 2014.

The third single ("Dust") was released on 23 January 2015.

The fourth single ("Closure") was released on 7 July 2016.

The fifth single ("Kingdom Come") was released on 3 January 2017.

== Track listing ==
All songs written by Clara Benin.

Human Eyes
No.	Title	Length
1.	"Human Eyes"	4:02
2.	"Easy"	2:53
3.	"Find Me"	4:08
4.	"Be My Thrill"	3:11
5.	"Closure"	3:42
6.	"Dust"	4:13
7.	"Blameless"	3:19
8.	"Cigarettes & Lighters"	3:42
9.	"Naked"	4:09
10.	"Kingdom Come"	3:57
Total length:		37:19
