= Traces (The Ransom Collective album) =

Studio album by The Ransom Collective
- Released: May 20, 2017
- Recorded: 2015–17
- Genre: Folk, pop, alternative
- Length: 53:00

The Ransom Collective chronology
The Ransom Collective	Traces

Singles from Traces
- 1. "Settled" Released: April 11, 2016; 2. "Open Road" Released: December 4, 2016

Traces is the debut studio album of Filipino indie folk band The Ransom Collective which was released on May 20, 2017. The album contains 11 tracks featuring re-recorded versions of songs from their 2014 self-titled EP, namely: Hither, Run, Images, and Fools.

Settled, the lead single, was released on April 11, 2016, and was followed by Open Road which was released on December 4, 2016. A vinyl version was released on March 27, 2018 by indie label Offshore Music.

== Background ==
The band is known for its upbeat and cheerful sound, but frontman Kian Ransom states that Traces will be different as it will be darker compared to their self-titled EP. Lily and Kian also said that Traces will have a more complex sound. “More complex rhythms, transitions, and the occasional fusion of other genres...it’s always good to change it up a little. That means you’re growing as an artist,” says Kian. Traces is a testament to their maturity as musicians and complexity as songwriters, opting for a more diverse content.

The album would also be a very personal one for each of the members. Drummer Redd Claudio says, "You’ll find that each track is based on a separate experience, it’s just narrating those experiences. That for me, shows how personal it is in that sense." "[The album] is about our lives, heartbreak, the things that we celebrate, the things that we go through, happiness. Anything that we go through in our lives, that's what Traces is all about, and all the memories," said Jermaine.

The band was also trying to be unpredictable in their songwriting, especially with Traces. Jermaine Ochoa Peck says, "With the music industry in general, this wave of sound is different from how it sounded before. I think we also just rode that wave. People are starting to be more open to the different sound…indie folk. It’s not only us, there’s a lot of other bands, who are also getting into this kind of music as well."

== Release ==
The band officially released the album on May 20, 2017, and hosted an album launch at The Palace Pool Club in Bonifacio Global City with musical acts Tandems ’91, Tom’s Story, and Ourselves the Elves. Indie musician Reese Lansangan was originally scheduled to perform at the launch, but due to commitments with MCA Music's GetMusic Indie-Go, she wasn't able to join and was replaced instead by Tandems '91.

== Track listing ==
All tracks are written by Kian Ransom.

No.	Title	Length
1.	"Open Road"	4:13
2.	"Settled"	5:07
3.	"Tides"	4:39
4.	"Doubt"	4:10
5.	"Hither (2017 Version)"	4:31
6.	"Something Better"	5:41
7.	"Traces"	4:36
8.	"Present Tense"	4:42
9.	"Run (2017 Version)"	4:49
10.	"Images (2017 Version)"	5:13
11.	"Fools (2017 Version)"	5:19
