= Hellmerry =

Filipino rapper

- Origin: Quezon City, Philippines
- Genres: Pinoy hip hop; trap; lo-fi; G-funk
- Occupation: Rapper
- Years active: 2021–present
- Labels: Young God Records; Sony Music Philippines

Hellmerry (Note: Stylized in all caps) is a Filipino rapper from Quezon City. He began his music career in 2021 and gained recognition for his songs "4:AM" and "My Day". He released his debut extended play (EP) BLUDEVL, while "My Day" became his first entry on the Billboard Philippines Hot 100.

== Career ==
=== 2021–2023: Early years and signing under Sony Music Philippines ===
Hellmerry started his music career in 2021 with the song "444" and became associated with Young God Records, where he released "WILLY WONKA" in January 2022. The song was produced by DAARTH, who also appeared on the first verse, and the music video included a masked guest credited as YXXNG GXD, although the identity of the guest was not confirmed.

In 2023, Hellmerry collaborated with Shanti Dope on "Y.G.G.", a party song influenced by West Coast hip-hop. The two were labelmates at Young God Records (not American record label), collaborated again on "Pull Up", released on October 25, 2023, through Universal Records. Around the same period, Hellmerry released the music video for "WATCHUMEAN", a collaboration with Buddahbeads. He signed with Sony Music Philippines. following the popularity of his releases, including "DAB (Leaked Interlude)", "4:AM", and "Thai Freestyle".

=== 2024–present: BLUDEVL ===
In 2024, Hellmerry released his debut extended play BLUDEVL, on August 10. The seven-track EP includes collaborations with Tommie King, Gaspari777, Baby G, and Zo Fuego. Its tracks include "Buckshot", "YG'z", "Gangsta Baby", "Fast Cash (Interlude)", "Regrets", "Pano Ba?", and "I'm Blessed", as well as a collaboration with Al James on "Tequila Rose". He was included in the Billboard Philippines Hip-Hop Class. In March, Hellmerry joined the Numinous X Asintada Australian Tour with Gloc-9, Flow G, Skusta Clee, Shanti Dope, John Roa, and Omar Baliw. In December, Hellmerry released "My Day", which became his first song to enter the Billboard Philippines Hot 100, debuted at No. 57 and entered the Top Philippine Songs chart at No. 22, and entered the Top Philippine Songs chart at No. 22, later reaching No. 5 on the Top 25 Philippine Songs chart after reaching No. 6. The song was ranked No. 1 on the Billboard Philippines Monthly Top 10 Genre Countdown for hip-hop.

On April 5, 2025, "4:AM" entered the Hot 100 at No. 92, also the music video reached No. 1 on YouTube's music category at the time of Billboard Philippines review. Hellmerry was also nominated for Hip-Hop Song of the Year at the Filipino Music Awards. He was also ranked No. 9 on Billboard Philippines' list of its Top 10 Artists. In September, Hellmerry was featured on Sica's "No Info" alongside Scoop Dogg. In November, he appeared on Scoop Dogg's "Blue Maserati". In October, "Gangsta Baby", a collaboration with Baby G from BLUDEVL, entered the Philippines Hot 100 at No. 82.

On May 23, 2026, Hellmerry released "Summer Crush", which entered the Philippines Hot 100 and the Top Philippine Songs chart. In August, he performed with Scoop Dogg at the Sun & Sands Downtown Hotel in Dubai, United Arab Emirates.

== Musical styles and influences ==
According to Hellmerry, he has open to different genres. He stated that he was open to collaborating with trap, lo-fi, G-funk, Memphis rap, and Afrobeats as long as he gets along with the genre. Before focusing on hip-hop, Hellmerry listened to rock music, including grunge and nu metal.

Hellmerry has cited Stick Figgas, Shanti Dope, Bugoy na Koykoy, Gloc-9, Al James and Flow G among the Filipino artists he listened to before pursuing his own career. Kara Angan of Billboard Philippines noted Hellmerry's softer delivery and use of melodic rap in "4:AM", as well as his use of instruments such as piano and string sounds.

== Discography ==
=== Extended plays ===
List of extended plays, with release date, label, and format shown
Title	Details	Ref.
BLUDEVL	Released: August 10, 2024; Label: Young God Records; Format: EP	

=== Singles ===
List of singles, showing year released, selected chart positions, and associated albums
Title	Year	Peak chart positions		Album	Ref.
		PHL	PHL Top		
"444"	2021	—	—	Non-album single	
"Anghell"	2021	—	—	Non-album single	
"WILLY WONKA"	2022	—	—	Non-album single	
"DAB (Leaked Interlude)"	2023	—	—	Non-album single	
"4:AM"	2023	92	—	Non-album single	
"Thai Freestyle" (with Tu$ Brothers)	2023	—	—	Non-album single	
"Y.G.G." (with Shanti Dope)	2023	—	—	Non-album single	
"Pull Up" (with Shanti Dope)	2023	—	—	Non-album single	
"WATCHUMEAN" (with Buddahbeads)	2023	—	—	Non-album single	
"Tequila Rose" (with Al James)	2024	—	—	Non-album single	
"My Day"	2024	4	3	Non-album single	
"Gangsta Baby" (with Baby G)	2024	82	—	BLUDEVL	
"WADADADENG!" (with YGxTUS, Tus Brothers and Scoop Dogg)	2024	—	—	Non-album single	
"No Info" (with Sica and Scoop Dogg)	2025	—	—	Non-album single	
"Blue Maserati" (with Scoop Dogg)	2025	—	—	Non-album single	
"D14U" (with KV)	2025	—	—	Non-album single	
"Lucky Kingz"	2025	—	—	Non-album single	
"Hot Keys" (with Daarth, Skinny G and Scoop Dogg)	2025	—	—	Non-album single	
"Summer Crush"	2026	49	25	Non-album single	
"WSKNNNMN" (with Scoop Dogg and Ron Henley)	2026	—	—	Non-album single	
"23"	2026	—	—	Non-album single	

== Awards and nominations ==
Award	Year	Category	Work	Result	Ref.
Filipino Music Awards	2025	Hip-Hop Song of the Year	"My Day"	Nominated	
