= Kiyo =

Filipino rapper

- Born: Yukihiro Rubio
- Genres: Pinoy hip hop; Alternative hip hop; lo-fi rap
- Occupations: Rap artist; songwriter
- Instrument: Vocals
- Years active: 2018–present
- Label: dyecast

Yukihiro Rubio, known professionally as Kiyo (stylized in lowercase) is a Filipino rapper and songwriter. He is known for his songs "Ikaw Lang", "Eba" and "Ano Na?".

== Career ==
Yukihiro Rubio started making music independently in 2011 when he was young under the name "kiyo". In 2018, he began writing songs during his teenage years when he collaborated with producer Alisson Shore on the track "Urong Sulong" (Back and Forth). He also collaborated for the track "Ano Na?" (What's Up?) with musical artist Calvin.

In 2019, kiyo released a track "G" which he wrote and was produced by independent artist Space Moses (also featured in the song) & SHORTONE. The following year, he released a single "Ikaw Lang" (Only You), which became a successful video on YouTube reaching 80 million views.

In 2020, kiyo released a single "Eba" which became mainstream gaining over 20 million views on YouTube. In 2021, he released a track "Harana sa Sarili" (Serenade to Oneself) and he explain the track opens with a breezy lo-fi beat, setting a laid-back and feel-good tone. The music video directed by himself depicts his enjoying the simple pleasures of everyday life, such as playing video games, relaxing by the pool, and spending time with friends. The song was included in his debut full-length album HARANASA, scheduled for release on November 26. The 15-track project features collaborations with notable producers and artists such as YZKK, Shortone, and Space Moses.

In 2022, kiyo collaborated with Filipino singer-songwriter Syd Hartha on the single "3:15". The song won Best Collaboration at the 36th Awit Awards.

In 2025, Kiyo collaborated with O/C Records artist Ryannah J on "Lambingan na This" and singer and member of the indie rock band IV of Spades, Zild Benitez, on the single "Pambihira" (Out of the Ordinary).

== Artistry ==
Kiyo's music is characterized by an eclectic blend of lo-fi rap and trap to experimental hip-hop, tropical jazz, ambient electronica, and bedroom pop. His debut album HARANASA, showcases this diversity through soulful samples and innovative production techniques. According to kiyo, the 15-track record from his album explores lyrical themes centered on love and its messily glorious iterations.

== Accolades ==
Year	Award	Category	Work	Result	Ref.
2024	Wish 107.5 Music Award	Wishclusive Hip-hop Performance of the Year	"Ikaw Lang"	Nominated	

== Discography ==
=== Studio albums ===
- HARANASA (2021)

=== Singles ===
- Urong-Sulong (featuring Allison Shore) (2018)
- Ano Na? (featuring Calvin) (2018)
- G (featuring Space Moses) (2019)
- Ikaw Lang (2019)
- Eba (2020)
- Harana sa Sarili (2021)
- glasshouse (2022)
- Puyat (2023)
- Tulo Laway (featuring Ace Cicera) (2023)
- Another Day (featuring Gloc-9) (2025)
- Lambingan na This (featuring Ryannah J) (2025)
- Pambihira (featuring Zild Benitez) (2025)

=== as Featured artist ===
- 3:15 (with Syd Hartha) (2022)
- Simula (by Emman Nimedez, with Allison Shore, Awi Columna) (2022)
