= Ayayayayay =

Studio album by Popong Landero ug ang Bag-ong Lumad
- Released: 1987
- Genre: Folk
- Language: Filipino; Cebuano
- Label: DEMS Foundation

Popong Landero chronology
Ayayayayay (1987)	Laylay sa Sidlakan (1993)

Bagong Lumad studio album chronology
Magkabilaan (1987)	Ayayayayay (1987)	Mga Awit ng Tanod-lupa (1991)

Ayayayayay is a studio album by Filipino folk singer Popong Landero and the Davao-based folk band Bagong Lumad, released in 1987 by the Development Education Media Services (DEMS) Foundation. The group's founder, Joey Ayala, stepped back from his regular role as the band's vocalist to allow Landero the opportunity to be the lead singer in a recording, and instead Ayala positioned himself as an instrumentalist and musical director for the album. Recorded using four-track equipment, 14 of the album's 16 songs are in Filipino, with the remaining two ("Bisan Pa" and "Bugsay") recorded in Cebuano. The title track "Ayayayayay" was originally written in Cebuano for the band's foray into musical theater, Sinalimba, in 1986.

Ayayayayay received positive reviews from critics such as Lav Diaz, who praised the group's musicality and the album's "raw" quality and integrity.

== Tracklist ==
All tracks are written by Popong Landero.

Side one
No.	Title	English translation	Length
1.	"Ayayayayay"
2.	"Malaya"	Free
3.	"Baliw"	Fool
4.	"Alitaptap sa Laot"	Firefly in the Middle of the Ocean
5.	"Bisan Pa"	Regardless
6.	"Awit ng Hardinero"	Song of the Gardener
7.	"Ulan-Ulan"	Raining
8.	"Kaliweteng Gitarista"	Lefthanded Guitarist

Side two
No.	Title	English translation	Length
1.	"Ina"	Mother
2.	"Titser"	Teacher
3.	"Bulaklak sa Dawag"	Flower on Thorny Vines
4.	"Krisis"	Crisis
5.	"Gubat"	Forest
6.	"Mga Panginoon"	Masters
7.	"Bugsay"	Paddle
8.	"Halina, Aking Pangga"	Come Here Now, My Darling

== Critical response ==
Lav Diaz, writing for the Manila Standard, gave Ayayayayay a highly favorable review, praising Landero and the band's musicality as well the album's "raw" economical quality and integrity that comes from the use of old-fashioned four-track equipment instead of more modern technology. Juaniyo Arcellana of National Midweek also gave the album a positive review, calling it an "intensely personal statement" and highlighting the songs "Kaliweteng Gitarista" and "Mga Panginoon." Mike Feria of the Manila Standard considered the album to be one of the highlights of the alternative music scene in 1987.
