= Befriending My Tears =

Studio album by Clara Benin
- Released: August 11, 2023
- Recorded: 2021–2024
- Length: 32:44
- Label: Offmute
- Producer: Fran Lorenzo; Sam Marquez; Gabba Santiago; Tim Marquez; Nick Lazaro; King Puentespina; Ken Yama; Clara Benin

Clara Benin chronology
Fragments (2020)	Befriending My Tears (2023)

Singles from Befriending My Tears
- 1. "blink" Released: December 26, 2021; 2. "affable dork" Released: July 15, 2022; 3. "different..." Released: January 27, 2023; 4. "small town" Released: April 21, 2023; 5. "keep still" Released: July 28, 2023

Befriending My Tears (stylized in lower-case as befriending my tears) is the second studio album by Filipino singer-songwriter Clara Benin. The album was released on August 11, 2023, under Offmute, a sublabel of Sony Music Philippines.

== Background ==
More than eight years after releasing her debut album, Benin announced on social media that she will be releasing her second album titled Befriending My Tears on 11 August 2023. On her approach to the album, Benin stated: “Believing in oneself is at the heart of this album. While the support and belief from others are invaluable, true healing can only begin when you learn to love and believe in yourself. It’s an essential step in the process of reconciling inner pain. We must all befriend our tears to embark on the path to healing.”

Benin released a deluxe edition of the album on November 29, 2024. The deluxe album consists of two new songs, a demo version of the song "blink", a remix version of five songs and a live version of two songs.

== Singles ==
The first single of the album "blink" was released more than two years prior to the release of the album. Benin revealed that the song is about recollecting, reliving and healing from her past experiences.

“I had a series of sleepless nights just recollecting and reliving different times of my life. Some were peaceful times. Some were turbulent times. Some were traumatic times. I didn’t really understand why these memories were resurfacing in my head. Writing ‘blink’ just helped me resolve these thoughts. “I particularly wanted this song to be a sonic journey that is metaphorical to one’s journey towards healing.”

— Clara Benin, on the song "blink", Daily Guardian (December 2021)

More than six months later, the second single of the album "affable dork" was released. Benin revealed that she wrote the song when she was in college and the song was about being head over heels over a person, fantasizing about the relationship like it was in a rom-com story.

“The song is about the thought process of a girl overthinking her relationship with an affable dork because she feels unworthy of his attention. You later on realise that fantasies only remain as such and don’t translate to reality.”

— Clara Benin, on the song "affable dork", NME (July 2022)

The third single of the album "different..." was released in January 2023. The song was inspired by the movie When Harry Met Sally. On her approach to the song, Benin stated: “My song is about having a really good friendship with someone and wondering if you two could take that relationship somewhere different.”

A couple of months later, the fourth single of the album "small town" was released. Benin revealed that the song was a post-breakup song with her high school love interest back when she was living in the province.

“Small town was inspired by my high school experience living in the province, where it was inevitable to bump into someone you know when you're out in public. It's a post-breakup song about trying to find yourself again and struggling because everything around you reminds you of your ex.”

— Clara Benin, on the song "small town", Indiegaga (April 2023)

The fifth single of the album "keep still" was released three months later. Benin revealed that the song explores themes of self-doubt, anxiety, and the fear of not living up to expectations—delving into the internal struggles and insecurities that a person experiences in their relationships and personal life.

== Track listing ==
Standard edition
No.	Title	Writer(s)	Producer(s)	Length
1.	"imposter syndrome"	C. Benin	Sam Marquez; Fran Lorenzo	3:15
2.	"small town"	C. Benin; G. Santiago	Gabba Santiago; Sam Marquez; timothy Run	3:25
3.	"blink"	C. Benin	Clara Benin; Fran Lorenzo	3:47
4.	"different..."	C. Benin	Fran Lorenzo	3:00
5.	"affable dork"	C. Benin	Fran Lorenzo	4:19
6.	"momentary"	C. Benin	Gabba Santiago; Fran Lorenzo	5:19
7.	"keep still"	C. Benin	Clara Benin; Sam Marquez	4:11
8.	"darling, i've been there"	C. Benin	Gabba Santiago; Fran Lorenzo	2:24
9.	"don't hurt yourself trying to get it all back"	C. Benin	timothy Run; Sam Marquez; Fran Lorenzo	3:00
Total length:				32:44

Deluxe edition bonus tracks
No.	Title	Writer(s)	Producer(s)	Length
10.	"hiding in the bathroom"	C. Benin	Sam Marquez; Nick Lazaro; Fran Lorenzo	2:55
11.	"all i do is cry"	C. Benin		4:40
12.	"blink (demo)"	C. Benin		3:16
13.	"small town (crwn's crying in the parking lot edit)"	C. Benin; G. Santiago	crwn	3:47
14.	"blink (timothyRun remix)"	C. Benin	timothy Run	3:42
15.	"different... (kenyama remix)"	C. Benin	Kenyama	3:00
16.	"keep still (theRingmaster remix)"	C. Benin	Clara Benin; Fran Lorenzo	4:21
17.	"don't hurt yourself trying to get it all back (kvtvlv remix)"	C. Benin		2:54
18.	"small town (live at music museum)"	C. Benin		4:01
19.	"momentary (live at music museum)"	C. Benin		5:48
Total length:				71:08

== Personnel ==
- Clara Benin - vocals, co-producer (tracks 3, 7, 16)
- Fran Lorenzo - co-producer (tracks 1, 3–6, 8–10, 16)
- Sam Marquez - co-producer (tracks 1–2, 7, 9–10)
- Tim Marquez - co-producer (tracks 2, 9, 14)
- Gabba Santiago - co-producer (tracks 2, 6, 8)
- Nick Lazaro - co-producer (track 10)
- King Puentespina - co-producer (track 13)
- Ken Yama - co-producer (track 15)
