= Reese Lansangan =

Filipino musician and designer

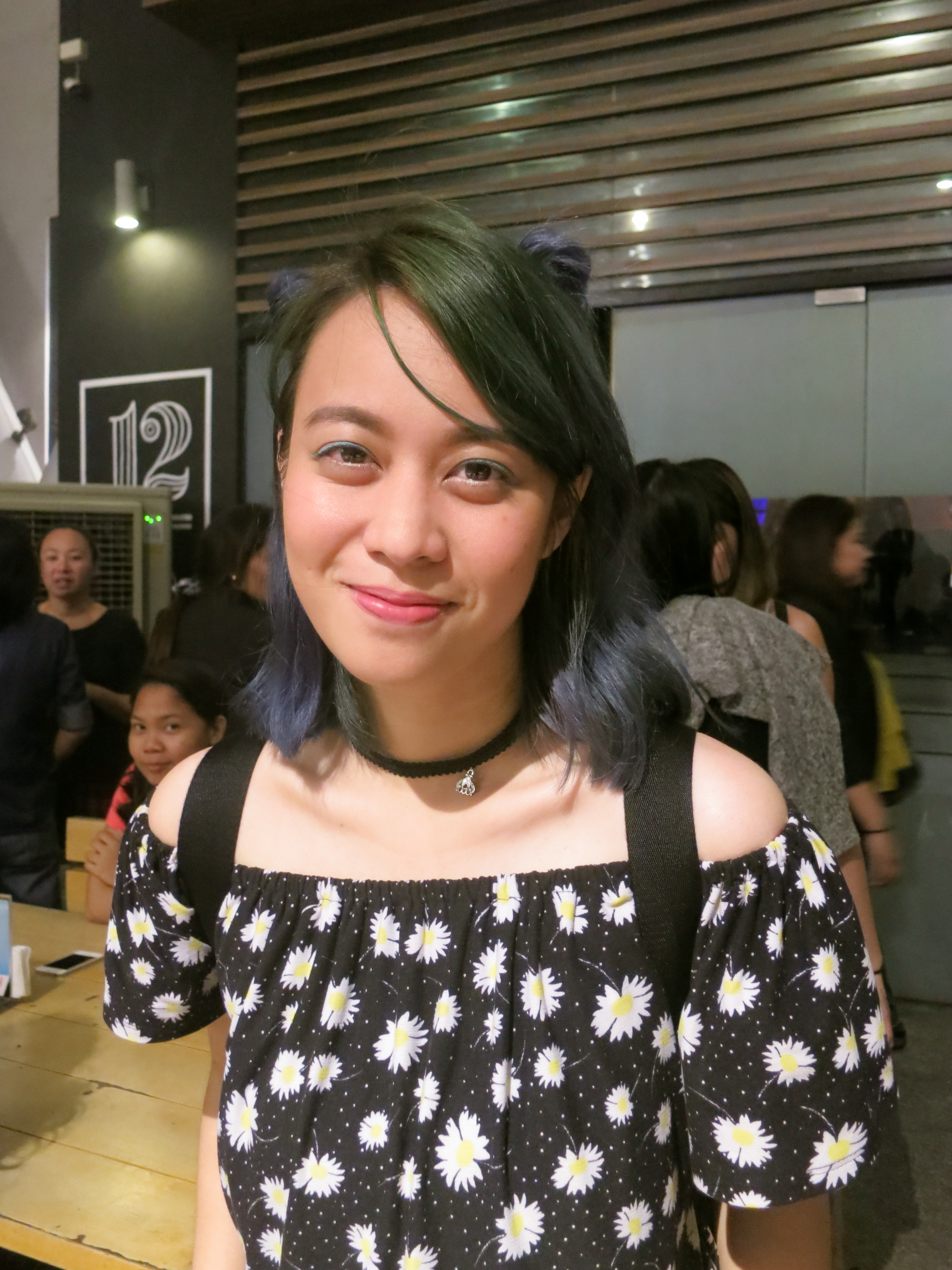
- Lansangan in 2016

Background information
- Born: October 16, 1990 (age 35)
- Origin: Quezon City, Philippines
- Genres: Indie pop, folk
- Occupations: Singer, songwriter, author, visual artist, graphic and fashion designer
- Instruments: Vocals; ukulele; guitar; keyboards
- Years active: 2009-present
- Label: Independent
- Website: reeselansangan.com

Maria Therese "Reese" Lansangan (born October 16, 1990) is a Filipino musician, singer-songwriter, visual artist, graphic designer, fashion designer, and published author. She is best known for her 2015 debut album Arigato, Internet!, and for being half of the indie duo Reese and Vica.

== 2013 Elements National Music Camp ==
In 2013, she was accepted into the Philippines' highly esteemed Elements National Music Camp, where she was mentored by the likes of Ryan Cayabyab, Joey Ayala and Noel Cabangon, among others.

== "Arigato, Internet!", 2015 & 2016 ==
On December 6, 2015, Lansangan launched her debut album called "Arigato, Internet!" at Green Sun, Makati. The album, being her way of thanking the Internet, consists of 11 songs, which were written and produced by herself, with help from some friends.

All tracks are written by Reese Lansangan.

No.	Title	Length
1.	"Exploration No. 5" (Ukulele: Reese Lansangan, Lead guitar: Josh Villena, Bongos: Carlo Maraingan)	3:48
2.	"Grammar Nazi" (Guitar: Reese Lansangan, Lead guitar: Josh Villena, Percussive sounds: Both)	4:40
3.	"Creeper" (Guitar: Reese Lansangan, Lead guitar: Josh Villena, Drums: Gabba Santiago, Upright bass: Miko Villena)	4:57
4.	"Code of Kin" (Guitar: Reese Lansangan, Cello: Coeli San Luis, Keys & Synths: Cholo Hermosa)	4:03
5.	"Slick" (Guitar: Reese Lansangan, Lead guitar: Josh Villena, Bongos: Carlo Maraingan)	3:49
6.	"Bleed" (Lead guitar: Josh VIllena, Drums: Gabba Santiago, Keys: Kai Honasan, Bass: Miko Villena)	3:51
7.	"A Song About Space" (Guitar: Reese Lansangan, Lead guitar: Josh Villena, Keys: Kai Honasan, Synths: Cris Garcimo)	4:24
8.	"Autopilot" (Guitar: Reese Lansangan, Lead guitar: Josh Villena, Drums: Mark Villena, Bass: Miko Villena)	3:31
9.	"St. Petersburg" (Guitar: Reese Lansangan, Lead guitar: Josh Villena, Kick & Keys: Cholo Hermosa)	5:03
10.	"On Wednesdays We Wear Pink" (homage to the movie Mean Girls (2004), Ukulele: Reese Lansangan, Lead guitar: Josh Villena, Percussion: Mark Villena)	4:36
11.	"Go Online" (Ukulele: Reese Lansangan)	5:03
Total length:		47:45

A year after, Lansangan announced that the album would have a limited edition reissue, having 7 bonus songs in collaboration with other local artists. The repackaged album was launched on February 12, 2017 at A Space, Makati.

Additional tracks:

All tracks are written by Reese Lansangan.

No.	Title	Length
1.	"Grammar Nazi (BP Valenzuela remix)" (remix produced by BP Valenzuela)
2.	"Autopilot (Moonlighter remix)" (remix produced by Lester Cruz)
3.	"Exploration No. 5 (CRWN remix)" (remix produced by King Puentespina)
4.	"Bleed (Area 25 remix)" (remix produced by April Hernandez and Clarence Garcia)
5.	"Home" (music & lyrics by Reese Lansangan, Arranged by Reese Lansangan, Choi Padilla, Allen Articulo)
6.	"Trophy Boy (2010 Version)" (music & lyrics by Reese Lansangan, Arrangement by Reese Lansangan, Recorded by Ace Libre, Mixed by Francis Victa)
7.	"St. Petersburg (Band version)" (music & lyrics by Reese Lansangan, Arrangement by Reese Lansangan, Josh Villena, Gabba Santiago, Lead guitar by Josh Villena, Drums by Gabba Santiago, Drums by Jason Conanan)

== "Of Sound Mind & Memory" (EP), 2017 ==
A surprise, four-tracked EP titled "Of Sound Mind & Memory" was released on April 30, 2017, described by Lansangan as "a deeply personal reflection of life and human condition".

All tracks are written by Maria Therese E. Lansangan.

No.	Title	Length
1.	"Aristophanes"	1:59
2.	"Machines and Men"	5:06
3.	"For The Fickle"	5:54
4.	"Wildwood"	4:06
Total length:		17:06

== "Playing Pretend in the Interim" (EP), 2020 ==
Pretend in the Interim is a five-track EP of songs, which are both a writing experiment and an examination of the self as a human living with and for others. Lansangan wrote these songs from different perspectives and characters (an encyclopedia salesman, a long-gone celebrity, a haunting ghost...) - seeing experiences with borrowed eyes. It is a combination of research, imagination, secondhand stories, histories, and things she has heard and witnessed along the way.

All tracks are written by Maria Therese E. Lansangan.

No.	Title	Length
1.	"Mall Rats"	4:04
2.	"Extended Vacation"	3:58
3.	"Ghosting"	4:14
4.	"The Encyclopedia Salesman"	4:22
5.	"When It Happens"	4:04
Total length:		20:43

== Coke Studio PH Season 1 (2017) ==
In the first season of Coke Studio PH, Reese Lansangan partnered with Filipino band Franco for a collaboration. They played one song from each other's own tracks in their own rendition and one entirely new song, which both of them made.

== Paramore Front Act (2018) ==
On August 23, 2018, Lansangan together with her guitarist, Josh Villena, performed as an opening act for the highly revered pop punk band, Paramore, on their third visit to Manila, Philippines for their Tour Four.

== Personal life ==
Lansangan graduated from the Ateneo de Manila University in 2011 with a Bachelor of Fine Arts degree in information design.

=== Published author ===
Lansangan has also co-authored a poetry book, In Case You Come Back with Marla Miniano and Jamie Catt in 2016. The book contains musings on different topics such as love, family, adventures, childhood, insecurities, and quirks, among other things. In September 2017, the three of them released a second book called, The Maps That Contain Us, a poetry and flash fiction book.

=== Reading advocacy ===
Lansangan has acknowledged that books and reading play a big part of her life, and a big influence on her art. During a holiday in the US in 2015, she started a personal tradition she refers to as the #ArigatoInternetHunt, where she hides copies of her album in various books, for strangers to find. She turned the tradition into an official promotion event, working with the Philippine bookstore chain Fully Booked (which she referred to as her "favorite bookstore.") in 2017.

== Discography ==
=== Studio albums ===
- Arigato, Internet! (2015)
- Arigato, Internet! (Domo Arigato Edition) (2016)
- Time Well Spent (2021)

=== Extended plays ===
- Of Sound Mind & Memory (2017)
- Playing Pretend in the Interim (2020)

== Awards and nominations ==
=== Wish Music Awards ===
Year	Award	Nominated work	Result	Ref.
2018	Wishclusive Contemporary Folk Performance of the Year	"Exploration No. 5"	Nominated	
2020	Wish Contemporary Folk Song of the Year	"An Opportunity To Go To The Moon"	Won	
