= Kulayan Natin =

Studio album by Munimuni
- Released: July 26, 2019
- Genre: Indie folk
- Length: 67:42
- Label: Marilag Records and Productions

Munimuni chronology
Simula (EP) (2017)	Kulayan Natin (2019)

Singles from Kulayan Natin
- 1. "Tahanan" Released: March 15, 2018; 2. "Oras" Released: August 29, 2018; 3. "Kalachuchi" Released: December 1, 2018

Kulayan Natin is the debut studio album by Filipino indie folk band Munimuni. It was released on July 26, 2019 by Marilag Records and Productions.

== Background ==
Two years after releasing their debut EP, Munimuni finally released their debut album.

Its title comes from the last song of the album, "Kulayan Natin".

Imagine a scene in a movie where the only colors present are black and white, with two people walking on a road and together “paint” the surroundings.

— AJ Jiao, on the meaning of the song/album,

== Singles ==
The first single of the album, "Tahanan" was released in March 2018. The song is about someone assuring a person experiencing difficulties that he will stay no matter what life brings. Owen Castro, the writer of the song, shared in an interview, "That’s nice, because that’s the goal of the song, to release all your tears. So if there are tears still left inside, you should let it out. Crying on that first line is okay because it means the tears will soon run out."

The second single of the album, "Oras" was released in August 2018.

The third single of the album, "Kalachuchi" was released in December 2018. The inspiration behind the song was during his days at the University of the Philippines Diliman, de Ocampo was walking with a “special person” inside the university premises sometime in May years ago, talking about the latter's problem, when that person saw kalachuchi flowers blossoming inside the university grounds.

== Track listing ==
Kulayan Natin
No.	Title	Writer(s)	Length
1.	"Simula"	TJ de Ocampo	6:46
2.	"Bakunawa"	Red Calayan; Adj Jiao	3:05
3.	"Oras" (Remastered)	Jiao	5:21
4.	"Bahay na Puti"	de Ocampo	5:19
5.	"Tahanan" (Remastered)	John Owen Castro	4:13
6.	"Solomon" (featuring Clara Benin)	de Ocampo	6:18
7.	"Pagsibol"	Castro	6:52
8.	"Bawat Piyesa"	de Ocampo	6:26
9.	"Kalachuchi" (Remastered)	de Ocampo	7:12
10.	"Banaag"	de Ocampo	5:56
11.	"Kulayan Natin"	Castro; de Ocampo; Jolo Ferrer; Jiao; Josh Tumaliuan	10:14
Total length:			67:42

== Personnel ==
=== Munimuni ===
- Adj Jiao – lead vocals ("Simula", "Bakunawa", "Oras", "Kulayan Natin"), guitar, backing vocals
- TJ de Ocampo – guitar, lead vocals ("Bahay na Puti", "Solomon", "Bawat Piyesa", "Kalachuchi", "Banaag"), backing vocals
- John Owen Castro – flute, backing vocals, lead vocals ("Tahanan", "Pagsibol")
- Jolo Ferrer – bass
- Josh Tumaliuan – drums

=== Additional personnel ===
- Clara Benin – co-lead vocals ("Solomon")
- Martin Honasan – creative director
- Arvin Ventura – sound engineer, mixing, mastering
- Luke Sigua – assistant sound engineer
