= I Rose Up Slowly =

EP by Clara Benin
- Released: October 11, 2019
- Genre: Indie; folk; acoustic
- Length: 19:20
- Producer: Nick Lazaro

Clara Benin chronology
Riverchild (2015)	I Rose Up Slowly (2019)	Fragments (2020)

Singles from I Rose Up Slowly
- 1. "Wrestle" Released: October 26, 2018

I Rose Up Slowly is the second extended play (EP) by Filipina singer Clara Benin. Its title comes from the fourth song of the EP, "I Rose Up Slowly". The EP consists of five original tracks, all were written by Benin herself.

== Background ==
After releasing her first EP Riverchild, Benin took a break with her music career. Benin then returned in 2018 and started recording her second EP, I Rose Up Slowly.

In October 2018, Benin released "Wrestle", the only single in the EP.

== Track listing ==
5 songs were written by Benin.

I Rose Up Slowly
No.	Title	Writer(s)	Length
1.	"Airplane Mode"	Benin	2:02
2.	"Tightrope"	Benin	3:53
3.	"Wrestle"	Benin	4:42
4.	"I Rose Up Slowly"	Benin	4:28
5.	"OMW (Back Home)"	Benin	4:15
Total length:			19:20
