= Bullet Dumas =

Filipino indie singer-songwriter

- Born: April 10, 1986 (age 40); Tacloban, Leyte, Philippines
- Genres: contemporary folk, OPM, indie
- Occupations: Musician, singer-songwriter, math teacher
- Years active: 2010–present

Bullet Dumas (born April 10, 1986) is a Filipino indie singer-songwriter. Dumas is best known for a contemporary folk style which has been described by critics as "raw, earthy," and distinctively Filipino, characterized by the use of the acoustic guitar as a strong rhythmic accent.

Dumas is widely known as a member of a folk trio that includes Johnoy Danao and Ebe Dancel named "3D", which is derived from the members' surnames. The group had a hit song entitled "Burnout", the official soundtrack of the movie, I'm Drunk, I Love You in 2017. The track is a remix of Dancel's original version with his original band, Sugarfree in 2001.

In 2018, Dumas released his debut album entitled "USISA".

== Personal life ==
Dumas was born on April 10, 1986. Aside from being a musician, Dumas also works as a Math teacher.

== Career ==
Dumas first received major critical attention when he attended the first ever Elements National Music Camp in 2010, where his musical stylings caught the attention of camp mentors, which were major figures in the Filipino contemporary music scene, including Ryan Cayabyab, Trina Belamide, Joey Ayala and Francis Reyes.

Since becoming an alumnus, Dumas began building a broader public following by performing as an independent musician, sharing the stage most notably with such artists as Johnoy Danao, Ebe Dancel, Gary Granada, Gary Valenciano, and Clara Benin.

In May 2014, Dumas released an EP, containing his songs "Pssst!" and "Ninuno" (the Filipino word for 'ancestor'), which became radio singles, garnering significant airplay in the few Manila radio stations whose formats allow for the playing of indie folk music. After a year of joint performances with fellow artists Johnoy Danao and Ebe Dancel culminated in a first anniversary concert at Music Museum in San Juan in February 2016, Dumas was signed the Filipino talent management agency Stages Talents

On October 6, 2018, Dumas released his debut album entitled "USISA" digitally, he also released a limited number of copies physically. Dumas launched his album in his first solo concert at the Music Museum on the same date. On February 16, 2019, Dumas released the official music video of the carrier single with same name on Facebook and YouTube and garnered half a million views.
