= Lili (musician) =

Filipina singer-songwriter

- Born: Lily Marie Judiel Gonzales; 2 July 1994 (age 32); Quezon City, Philippines
- Genres: Indie pop, folk, acoustic
- Occupations: Musician, songwriter
- Instruments: Guitar, ukulele, piano
- Years active: 2013–present
- Label: Sony
- Website: www.just-lili.com

Lily Marie Judiel Gonzales (born 2 July 1994), known by her stage name Lili, is a Filipina indie pop singer-songwriter, performing both as a solo artist and as a member of the indie folk band The Ransom Collective.

== Personal life ==
Gonzales was born on 2 July 1994 in Quezon City, Philippines. Her grandparents are both artists. Her grandfather, Josefino Cenizal, was an actor, director, and composer, his most popular song being "Hindi Kita Malimot" (I Can't Forget You). Her grandmother is Olivia Cenizal, a popular Filipino actress in the 1950s.

== Musical career ==
Gonzales joined the Philippine music scene in 2013 as keyboardist of The Ransom Collective (alongside her sister Muriel who plays as violinist). Since the COVID-19 pandemic, the band has been on an unofficial hiatus. In March 2020, Gonzales was in Indonesia when lockdown was declared. She returned home to the Philippines in December 2020, and feeling inspired by her experience, found the time to write, record, and produce new songs. Under the name Lili, she released her first single "Summer" in April 2021 followed by her second single "Till Then" in June. On July 23, 2021, she dropped "By the Sea", her first ukulele song. All three singles are set to appear under her debut album Sunchild.

=== Album ===
Title	Details
Sunchild	Released: October 28, 2021; Label: Sony Music Philippines

=== Singles ===
Year	Song	Album
2021	"Summer"	Sunchild
2021	"Till Then"	Sunchild
2021	"By the Sea"	Sunchild
