= Clara Benin =

Filipino singer-songwriter (born 1994)

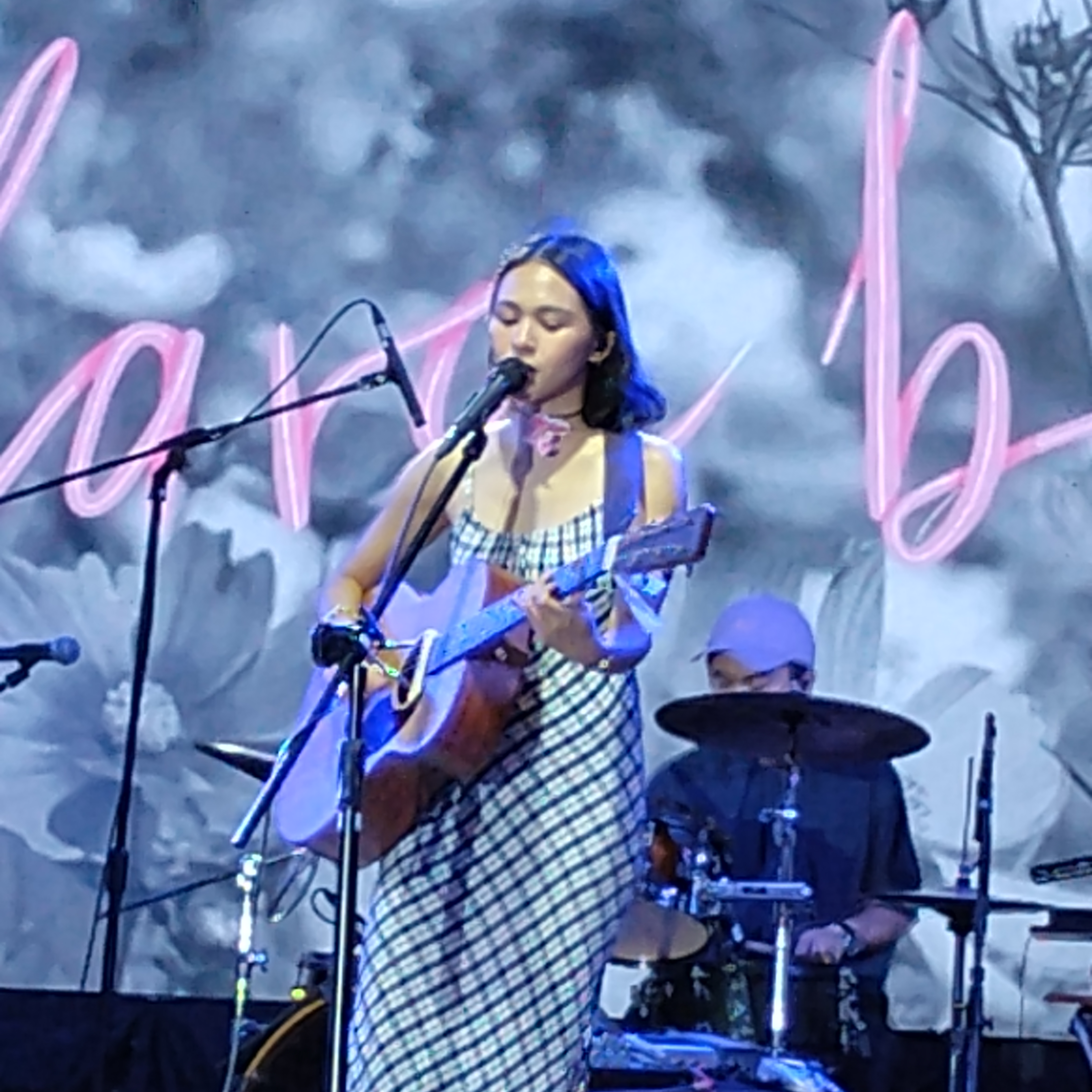
- Benin in 2025

Background information
- Born: February 19, 1994 (age 32); Manila, Philippines
- Genres: Indie; folk; acoustic
- Occupations: Musician; singer; songwriter; producer
- Instruments: Vocals; guitar; piano; keyboards
- Years active: 2013–present
- Label: Offmute
- Website: clarabenin.com

Clara Benin (born February 19, 1994) is a Filipino singer-songwriter best known for her track "Parallel Universe". As of October 2019, Benin has amassed tens of millions of streams on Spotify.

== Early life and education ==
Clara Benin was born on February 19, 1994, in Manila, Philippines, as the eldest daughter of former Side A member Joey Benin. She has three other siblings: Boey, Jaco, and Sarah; they are also inclined to music. She moved to Bacolod during high school then went back to Metro Manila for college, taking up music business production at MINT College in Taguig. After graduating, Benin went back to Bacolod to rest.

== Career ==
=== 2012–2014: Early days ===
==== Elements National Music Camp ====
In 2012, while studying in college, Benin released a video of her original composition "Closure".

In 2013, she was accepted, in the same batch with fellow artists Reese and Vica and Sitti, into the Philippines' Elements National Music Camp. Here she was mentored by Ryan Cayabyab, Joey Ayala and Noel Cabangon.

==== Philippine Popular Music Festival ====
In 2014, she performed the McDonald's jingle "Hooray for Today". She then participated with Mcoy Fundales at the third Philippine Popular Music Festival to interpret the song entry "Kung Akin Ang Langit", written by Chi Datu-Bocobo and Isaac Joseph Garcia. The song won the Spinnr People's Choice Award.

Benin wrote and recorded the theme song ("Araw't Gabi") for the independent film Red.

=== 2015: Breakthrough ===
Her debut album "Human Eyes" was released on March 7, 2015, at 26th St. Bistro in BGC.

==== Debut album: Human Eyes ====
"Human Eyes" was recorded in three months at the Sonic Boom studio at MINT College and at Loudbox Studios. The album is self-produced, with the help of her father Joey Benin, indie music impresario Alex Lim, and studio producer/engineer Angee Rozul for mixing and mastering.

==== First EP: Riverchild ====
In November 2015, Benin released the EP titled Riverchild that she produced, wrote, and mixed.

The "Riverchild" EP is part of an advocacy campaign for bringing children to school. Proceeds will go to the Tapulanga Foundation, a non-profit charitable organization working to uplift the lives of those who were born with less through educational scholarships and healthcare assistance.

=== 2016: Hiatus ===
In 2016, Benin announced that she would take a break from music after her first solo concert due to personal reasons.

=== 2017–present: Comeback ===
In 2017, after announcing a hiatus, Benin made her comeback and released a new single titled "Parallel Universe".

==== Zandari Festa and Coke Studio Philippines ====
Benin performed in the 2019 edition of Zandari Festa, an annual three-day music festival held in Seoul, South Korea.

It was announced that Benin will be participating in the third season of Coke Studio Philippines, an annual music television program in the Philippines featuring performances by various Filipino music artists.

==== Second EP: I Rose Up Slowly ====
In October 2019, nearly four years after releasing her debut EP, Benin released her second EP titled I Rose Up Slowly. The EP consists of five original tracks, produced by Nick Lazaro.

==== Third EP: Fragments ====
In November 2020, Benin released her third EP titled Fragments, featuring "Araw at Gabi" and "Wine", which are songs that she previously released.

==== Second album: Befriending My Tears ====
In August 2023, Benin released her second album Befriending My Tears. The album consisted of nine original songs and was released under Sony Music Philippines sublabel OFFMUTE.

== Discography ==
Albums

- Human Eyes (2015)
- Befriending My Tears (2023)

EPs

- Riverchild (2015)
- I Rose Up Slowly (2019)
- Fragments (2020)

== Accolades ==
Year	Award	Category	Notable Works	Result	Ref(s)
2014	3rd Philippine Popular Music Festival	Spinnr People’s Choice Award	"Kung Akin Ang Langit" (with Mcoy Fundales)	Won	
2020	5th Wish 107.5 Music Awards	Wishclusive Contemporary Folk Performance of the Year	"I Rose Up Slowly"	Won	
2020	5th Wish 107.5 Music Awards	Wishclusive Collaboration of the Year	"Solomon" (with Munimuni)	Nominated	
2020	5th Wish 107.5 Music Awards	Wish Artist of the Year	"Clara Benin"	Nominated	
2021	6th Wish 107.5 Music Awards	Wishclusive Contemporary Folk Performance of the Year	"It’s Okay”	Nominated	
2021	6th Wish 107.5 Music Awards	Wish Contemporary Folk Song of the Year	"Wine"	Nominated	
2021	6th Wish 107.5 Music Awards	Wish Artist of the Year	"Clara Benin"	Nominated	
2021	34th Awit Awards	Best Ballad Recording	"Araw at Gabi"	Nominated	
2021	34th Awit Awards	Peoples' Voice Favorite Female Artist	"Clara Benin"	Nominated	
2022	35th Awit Awards	Best Engineered Recording	"Blink" (with Fran Lorenzo)	Won	
2023	8th Wish 107.5 Music Awards	Wishclusive Contemporary Folk Performance of the Year	"Blink”	Nominated	
2023	8th Wish 107.5 Music Awards	Wish Contemporary Folk Song of the Year	"Affable Dork"	Nominated	
2023	36th Awit Awards	Best Jazz Recording	"Affable Dork"	Nominated	
2023	36th Awit Awards	Best Performance by a Female Recording Artist	"Affable Dork"	Nominated	
2024	9th Wish 107.5 Music Awards	Wishclusive Rock/Alternative Performance of the Year	"Small Town”	Nominated	
2024	9th Wish 107.5 Music Awards	Wish Contemporary Folk Song of the Year	"Imposter Syndrome"	Nominated	
2024	9th Wish 107.5 Music Awards	Wish Artist of the Year	"Clara Benin"	Nominated	
2024	37th Awit Awards	Best Performance by a Solo Artist	"Small Town”	Nominated	
2024	37th Awit Awards	Best Christmas Recording	"Can't Wait to See You On Christmas Day”	Nominated	
