= Side A (group) =

Filipino pop band

- Origin: Manila, Philippines
- Genres: Rock; Pop; OPM; R&B
- Works: Albums; singles; songs; covers; recording sessions; performances
- Years active: 1985–present
- Labels: Ivory; Vicor; Warner; Viva; MCA
- Spinoff of: Freeverse
- Members: Naldy Gonzalez; Ernie Severino; Leevon Cailao; Ned Esguerra; Yubs Esperat; (see § Band members for others)

Side A is a Filipino pop band formed in 1985. They gained recognition in the Filipino music scene in the late 1980s through to the early 2000s. They are best known for their single "Forevermore." In 1993, the group's third album went triple platinum and in the mid-1990s, Side A garnered two Awit Awards.

== History ==
=== Formation: 1985-1990 ===
Side A was founded in 1985 by the brothers Rodel and Naldy Gonzalez, Mar Dizon, Gabe Escalon, Bobot Barroga and their original lead singer Ding Silverio. The band played at Holiday Inn, Rumors, Zigzag, Tavern on the Square and also performed at The Rock Wars Concert. They also performed at the Grand Hyatt Hotel Baguio back to back with The Powerplay Band. Through their eventual manager, Wyngard Tracy's support the band gained a following and made a name in the local music circuit. Due to professional and musical differences, Ding, Gabe and Bobot eventually left the band and were replaced by Pido Lalimarmo, Joey Benin and Kelly Badon. The band released its eponymous debut album in 1989. The band was first managed by the Christian-oriented artist management company called Artistation Inc., owned by the late Wyngard Tracy.

=== First recordings ===
Side A's debut album included their first hit single "Eva Marie" which kickstarted their recording career. Classic Side A songs such as "Windows of Our Souls" and "'Di Pa Huli" can be found on the album. The uptempo "'Di Pa Huli" garnered further attention. Instead of being written as "Side B", the B-side of their albums were written as "Side A too".

Shortly after the success of their debut album, Rodel Gonzalez left for the band Second Wind. Pido Lalimarmo and Mar Dizon left in 1990 to form Artstart. Lalimarmo and Dizon remained with Artstart until 1994 when Lalimarmo united with Eva Marie Poon (sister of Richard Poon) to form Take One and Dizon joining Parliament Syndicate.

=== Side A mania and touring years ===
Side A's second album, The White Album, also their debut release under Vicor Music, earned double and triple platinum status for its sales. One of the biggest hits included on the album is "Hold On", featuring new lead vocalist Joey Generoso born in 1962 and new drummer Ernie Severino completing and forming the band's long-running line-up.

The Blue Album, their second album under Vicor, also went double and triple platinum. The album features a cover version of Labuyo's "Tuloy Pa Rin Ako" which was recorded live at the Music Hall, one of the premiere lounges in Manila. The album cover is the same design as the White Album with the embossed Side A logo, only this time in blue.

In 1995, the album By Your Side under Warner reached gold status. The band won two Awit Awards: Best Performance by a Group for "By Your Side" and Best Jazz Performance with vocals for "True Love Can Always Wait". It was also the only album they released internationally with two additional singles: "Forevermore" and a cover of the Joey Albert song, "Tell Me". This album commemorated Side A's 10 years in the music industry.

Side A held a 10th anniversary concert at the Cuneta Astrodome in Pasay and a live recording of the show was released titled Side A Live! The 10th Anniversary Concert which went triple platinum. This album contained cover versions of international and local OPM love songs. It includes the Joey Benin-written Janno Gibbs original "I Believe in Dreams", as well as a version of James Taylor's "Your Smiling Face" in which all of the band members could be heard singing solo parts.

In 1997, the album Year 12 was released and was certified gold. The album features a collaboration of international songwriters including Sharon Cuneta. It commemorated their twelfth year as a band.

In September 1998, Side A's offering for the Philippine Centennial Year, the album Ang Ating Awitin was released. Advance orders of the album guaranteed a gold album award for the group in its first week of release. It includes an alternative version of the Hotdog song, "Manila".

In 1999, the band released Remember December, their first and only Christmas album, and in 2000 the album Will I Ever was released with its carrier single, "Will I Ever". The album proved to be a minor success.

A compilation of all the band's greatest hits from 1985 to 2001 was released in the album The Platinum Collection. It contains new versions of their old hits.

In 2003, the band released the album "Titanium"

=== Departures and struggles ===
In 2005, Kelly Badon left the band to form The Kelly Badon Project with former members of Freeverse. Badon was replaced by former Take One guitarist Leevon Cailao (making him the youngest member of the band). His debut with the band features him singing Fra Lippo Lippi's "Later" on their 2005 Gig: All Hits Live (at Bagaberde) album. The live album had minimal success.

Joey Benin left Side A in 2008. He currently tends a fish farm and a developing natural organic farmland in Silay, Negros Occidental with his wife and kids. He was replaced by Ned Esguerra, former Freeverse member.

Joey Generoso left Side A in 2015 to pursue a solo career under the name Joey G.

=== Sudden return and reunion ===
In September 2020, the original lineup - the Gonzalez brothers, Joey Benin, Kelly Badon, Mar Dizon and Pido Lalimarmo - released a re-recording of "'Di Pa Huli" via Patreon. The single is part of the original lineup's reunion project Side A Redux: First Album, consisting of new versions of songs from their eponymous 1989 debut album as well as new material. The original lineup staged an online benefit concert titled "Calesa: Side A Redux" on January 30, 2021.

In January 2021, the current lineup released a new single "Until You".

== Artistry ==
Side A is renowned for its refined musicianship, vocal harmonies, and blend of soft rock, pop, OPM, R&B, and psychedelic influences. The band’s artistry is defined by emotionally expressive arrangements, instrumental performances, and songs that emphasize melody and heartfelt storytelling. Their love songs, combined with production and ensemble playing, have made them one of the most known bands in Original Pilipino Music (OPM).

== Band members ==
Principal members

- Naldy Gonzalez - keyboards, vocals (1985–present)
- Ernie Severino - drums, percussion, vocals (1990–present)
- Leevon Cailao - guitar, rhythm, vocals (2005–present)
- Ned Esguerra - bass, vocals (2008–present)
- Yubs Esperat - vocals, guitar (2015–present)

Early members

- Pido Lalimarmo - vocals, guitar (1985–1990, 2020 reunion)
- Rodel Gonzalez - guitar, saxophone, vocals (1985–1990, 2020 reunion)
- Mar Dizon - drums, percussion, vocals (1985–1990, 2020 reunion)
- Kelly Badon - guitar, rhythm, vocals (1985–2005, 2020 reunion)
- Joey Benin - bass, vocals (1985–2008, 2020 reunion)
- Joey Generoso - vocals, guitar (1990–2015)

Temporary members

- Ding Silverio - vocals, guitar (1985)
- Bobot Barroga - bass (1985)
- Gabe Escalon - guitar (1985)
- Benjie "Bagets" Mendez - drums, percussion (1988–1992)

== Discography ==
Side A's core catalogue consists of the original 9 OPM studio albums, Forevermore (a special album which was brought into the core catalog in the 1990s when their discography was standardized for compact disc). Their songs including the So Many Questions and Until Then, which contains Filipino non-album singles and EP tracks not released on the previously mentioned 9 releases.

- Side A (1989)
- Side A (The White Album) (1991)
- Side A (The Blue Album) (1993)
- So Many Questions (Single) (1994)
- By Your Side (1995)
- Forevermore (1995)
- Until Then (Single) (1996)
- Side A 12 (1997)
- Ang Awitin Natin (1998)
- Will I Ever (2000)
- Titanium (2003)
- Only One (2009)
