= Joey Benin =

Filipino musician and composer (born 1967)

- Born: 22 December 1967 (age 58); Manila, Philippines
- Occupations: bass guitarist, singer, songwriter
- Years active: 1985–2008; 2020
- Known for: Side A
- Spouse: Eva Marie "Bing" Ledesma
- Children: Jaco Benin; Clara Benin; Sarah Benin; Boey Benin

Joey Benin or Joey B (born 22 December 1967) is a Filipino bassist, singer, producer and musical arranger. He is best known as a former member of the band Side A and as songwriter for the hit song "Forevermore".

== Music career ==
In 1985, Benin joined Side A as bass player. At the time, he was the youngest member in the band and also responsible for the song "Eva Marie". He later left Side A permanently to spend more time with his family and their business. Joey B was replaced by Ned Esguerra, former member of the band Freeverse.

As a composer, he has worked with such artists as Pido Lalimarmo, Janno Gibbs, Regine Velasquez, Martin Nievera, his own band Side A and Japanese sound/recording engineer Koji Ishikawa.

== Personal life ==
Benin studied at UP College of Music with a Major in Guitar and Minor in Piano. He is married to Eva Marie "Bing" Ledesma-Benin; to whom the song "Eva Marie" was written for. They have four children: Boey, Jaco, Clara (of the song "Clara's Eyes") and Sarah.

After leaving Side A, Benin became a haciendero, currently tending a fish farm and develops a natural organic farmland in Silay, Negros Occidental. He also writes music for Tapulanga and Kalipay. Both foundations are helping less fortunate children find homes and get a good education.

Benin is currently one of the staff and ministers of Victory Silay.

== Discography ==
=== Popular compositions and arrangements ===
- "I Believe in Dreams" – Janno Gibbs
- "Forevermore" – Side A's single won them the 1996 Awit Award for Best Performance by a Group for the third consecutive year and the Song of the Year.
- "Only You" – Regine Velasquez

=== Movie theme song ===
- "Munting Hiling" – Inang Yaya
- "Nanay" – Inang Yaya theme song (finalist at Gabi ng Parangal Famas Awards ’07)
- "Forevermore" – Forevermore
- "Got to Believe in Magic" – song arrangement for the film Got 2 Believe

=== Awards as a songwriter and musician ===
- Awit Award for Song of the Year 1996 – "Forevermore"
- Katha Music Award for Song of the Year 1996 – "Forevermore"
- Awit Award for Best Arrangement 1998 – "Ugoy ng Duyan"
- Metro Pop 1999 – third place with "Clara's Eyes"
- Awit Award for Song of the Year 1999 – "Clara's Eyes"
- Awit Award for Best Arrangement 1999 – "Clara's Eyes"
