= Toneejay =

- Born: TJ de Ocampo
- Genres: Pop
- Instruments: Guitar; vocals
- Formerly of: Munimuni (until 2020)

TJ de Ocampo known professionally as Toneejay (stylized as TONEEJAY) is a Filipino singer-songwriter. He was also the vocalist of indie band Munimuni.

== Career ==
=== Munimuni ===
TJ de Ocampo was a vocalist for the indie band Munimuni and was among the original members when it got formed in 2012 or 2013. With the group, they mostly performed songs in the Filipino language. The group went on a hiatus in September 2020. In June 2021 the band returned but announced the departure of de Ocampo.

=== Solo artist ===
De Ocampo in January 2022, released his debut album entitled Beginning/End. It is a nine-track album written mostly in English, save for the last song, "Lenggwahe". De Ocampo is now performing under the name TONEEJAY.

Toneejay credits TikTok for helping his music career which he says enabled him reach a younger demographic. One notable work he performed was the song "711" which topped Billboard Philippines and the Spotify Philippines chart in late 2023.

== Personal life ==
Toneejay has a child.
