= Wanderland Music and Arts Festival =

Annual music festival in the Philippines

Wanderland

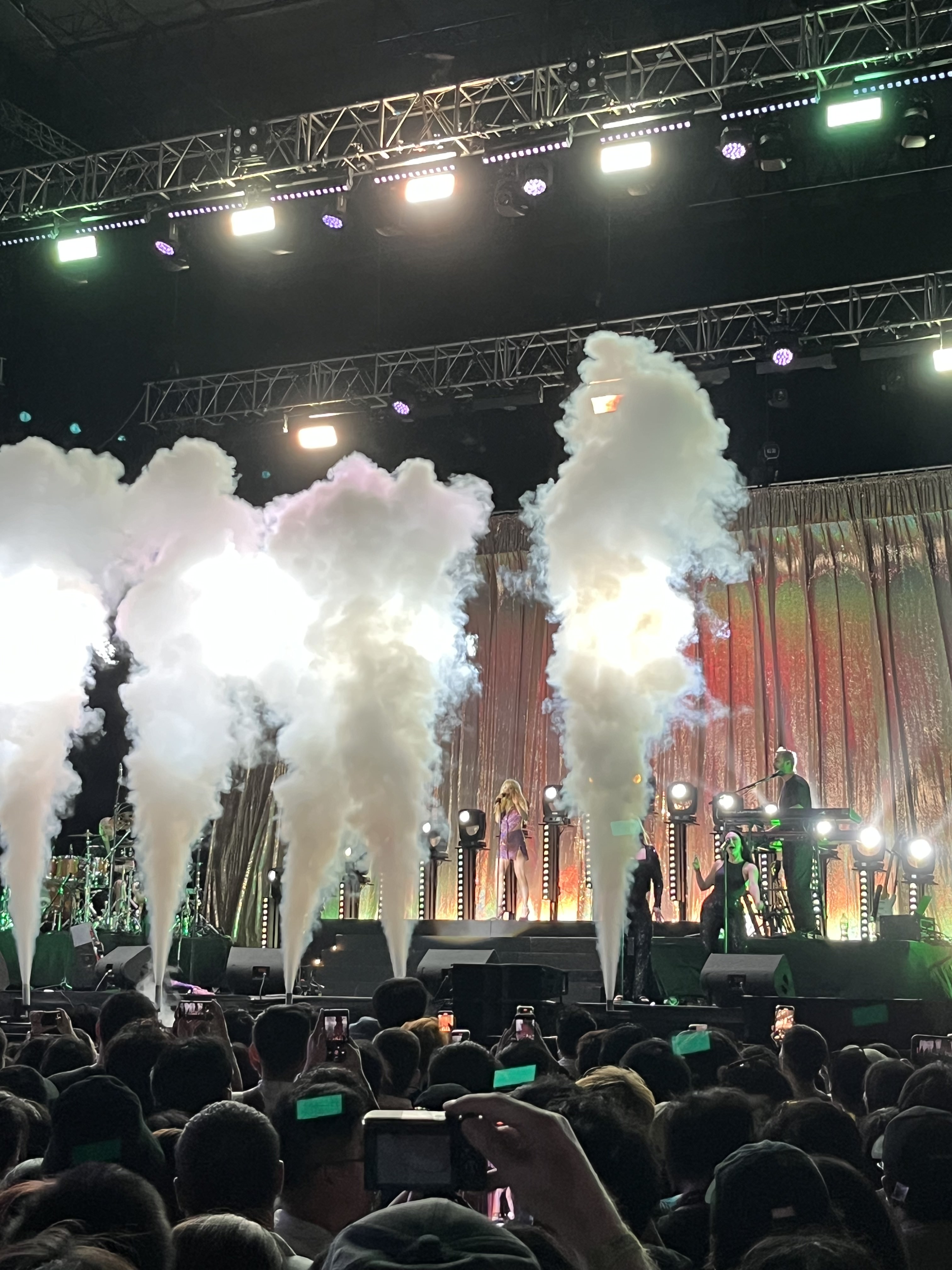
- Carly Rae Jepsen during the So Nice Tour at Wanderland 2023
- Genre: Indie, rock, hip hop and others
- Dates: March
- Locations: Globe Circuit Event Grounds; Makati, Philippines (2013–2016); Filinvest City Event Grounds; Muntinlupa, Philippines (2017–2025)
- Years active: 2013–2025 (on hiatus)
- Founders: Stephanie Uy; John Uy; Nicole Uy
- Organiser: Karpos Multimedia
- Website: Official website

The Wanderland Music and Arts Festival, commonly referred to as Wanderland, was an annual outdoor music and arts festival held in the Philippines organized by Karpos Multimedia. It showcased international and local live music, and art installations.

== History ==
=== Karpos Multimedia ===
Promotional logo during Wanderland Jungle 2017

The Wanderland Music and Arts Festival was founded in 2013 by Karpos Multimedia Inc., a Manila-based content marketing and event management company established by siblings Stephanie, John, and Nicole Uy in 2011. The company, initially a graphics and web design firm, entered the concert production industry in 2012. Karpos's first major production was the Irish band The Cranberries's concert at the Araneta Coliseum.

=== Origins and early development ===
The idea for Wanderland was conceived during a casual discussion among the Uy siblings when Stephanie, John, and Nicole were still college students. Stephanie attended the De La Salle–College of Saint Benilde, while John and Nicole were at De La Salle University. They were inspired by the lack of similar festivals in the Philippines and sought to create an event comparable to international music festivals. Despite their limited experience in festival organization, the siblings pursued the project with guidance from their father, who was a television station executive, and support from their family.

The inaugural Wanderland Music and Arts Festival was held in 2013 at Circuit Makati, featuring international acts such as The Temper Trap, Neon Trees, and Nada Surf, alongside local artists like UDD and She's Only Sixteen. The Uy siblings organized the festival with minimal prior experience, and they told Esquire magazine about the significant challenges they faced in securing sponsors, managing logistics, and promoting the event. Nonetheless, Wanderland 2013 was widely regarded as a success by several music critics. Ysmael Suarez and Alfonso Dimla of The LaSallian reported that the festival, described as an "instant classic", provided attendees with a diverse lineup and a vibrant atmosphere. Despite challenges such as crowd density and heat, the festival-goers engaged actively with the performances and activities, contributing to the festival's lively ambiance. Abigail Bautista of the Philippine Daily Inquirer highlighted the enthusiastic crowd responses, particularly to sets by UDD and The Temper Trap. Suarez and Dimla noted that the acts delivered "electric" performances, with UDD and The Temper Trap eliciting strong audience participation, especially during encores like "Tadhana" and "Sweet Disposition", respectively.

Stephanie Uy, president of Karpos Multimedia, acknowledged the challenges in planning and executing the event within a short timeframe. In an interview with Ralph Mendoza of The Philippine Star, she described the event as a significant achievement despite the logistical difficulties and highlighted the Karpos team's effective management of the festival. Uy also said that the festival demonstrated Manila's readiness for large-scale music events and set a new standard for future festivals in Southeast Asia.

=== Growth and expansion ===
Following its successful debut, Wanderland quickly gained popularity and expanded its scope. Each year, the festival introduced new elements, including art installations and interactive experiences. In 2019, Wanderland extended from a single-day event to a two-day festival. In addition to music, Wanderland has also expanded to cater to various forms of art, incorporating visual art. This expansion allowed for a broader lineup and enhanced activities, accommodating the growing interest from attendees and providing a more comprehensive festival experience that enriches the cultural experience of festival-goers.

==== Pre-events ====
Karpos Multimedia has introduced Wanderband, an annual battle of local independent bands. The winner and runner-up are given the chance to play live at the Wanderland Music and Arts Festival. Notable Wanderband winners include Lola Amour, who won the 2016 edition to perform at Wanderland 2017. Since 2017, Karpos has launched a similar annual battle for live visual artists to perform at Wanderland called Wanderartists.

In partnership with JanSport, Wanderland held a prelude mini concert to the Wanderland Music and Arts Festival 2015 entitled Bonfire Sessions at the SM Mall of Asia in Pasay.

=== Wanderland 2020 ===
Due to the COVID-19 pandemic in the Philippines, organizers announced on March 4, 2020, that the music festival would be indefinitely postponed in accordance with quarantine, mass gathering, and social distancing protocols set by the Inter-Agency Task Force for the Management of Emerging Infectious Diseases.

=== Wanderland 2023 ===
After a two-year hiatus due to the COVID-19 pandemic, Karpos announced in November 2022 that they would hold Wanderland again on March 4–5, 2023, which was billed as 'Wanderland: The Comeback. For the event, Karpos retained the sports and athletics theme that they initially used for Wanderland 2020.

=== Wanderland 2025 ===
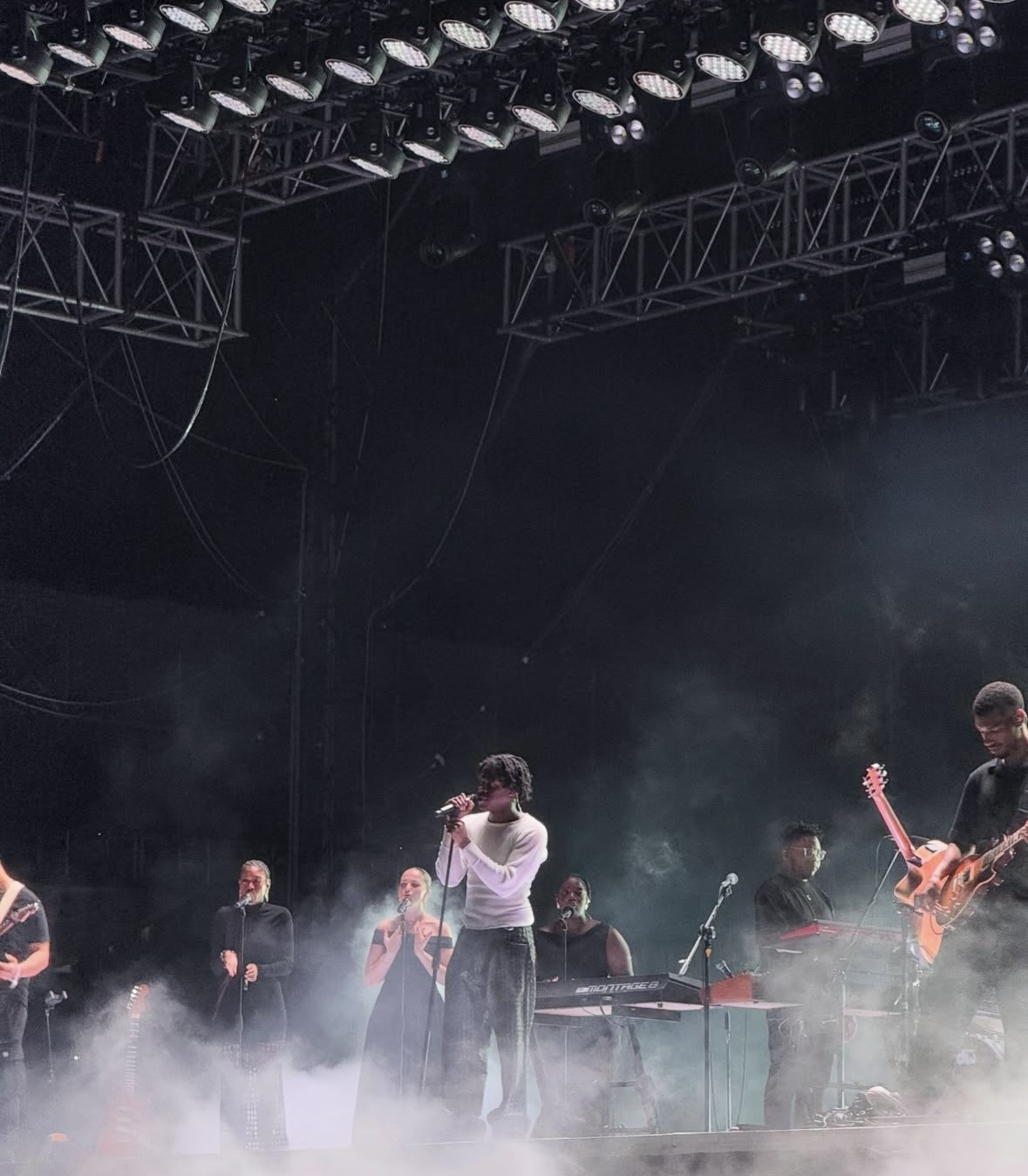
Daniel Caesar performing at Wanderland World: A World of Wonders on March 22, 2025

On December 17, 2024, Karpos announced that the upcoming Wanderland Festival, titled Wanderland World: A World of Wonders, would commemorate the festival's tenth anniversary on March 22–23, 2025, with a theme celebrating its past editions. Karpos expressed its intention to invite artists who previously headlined earlier iterations of the festival. On January 29, 2025, Karpos confirmed that Canadian singer Daniel Caesar and English duo Honne—headliners from the 2018 and 2019 festivals, respectively—would return as the main acts for Wanderland 2025.

Music reviewers generally praised Wanderland World: A World of Wonders. Gabriel Saulog, Rome Saenz, and Ralph Regis of Billboard Philippines emphasized the festival's successful blend of nostalgia and innovation, highlighting returning acts like Caesar and Honne alongside emerging artists such as local band ALYSON, American project Dayglow, and Thai singer-songwriter Mindfreakkk. Caesar's anticipated set received praise for audience engagement but criticism for excessive reliance on crowd participation instead of fully displaying his vocal capabilities. Honne's visually striking closing performance was well-received. Paul John Caña of Esquire described Wanderland as an essential cultural event akin to prominent regional festivals such as Clockenflap in Hong Kong and Fuji Rock in Japan, appreciating its communal atmosphere and escapism from daily life. He praised Australian musician Chet Faker's Philippine debut and Dayglow's performance while also raising questions about the festival's future given a noticeable absence of references to upcoming editions, which typically appear on jumbotron screens throughout the event. Juno Reyes of Rappler praised the punctuality and smooth execution of the festival schedule.

=== Wanderland 2026 ===
On March 17, 2026, organizer Karpos announced that the Wanderland Music and Arts Festival will not take place in 2026 and would be placed on hiatus for foreseeable future.

== Editions ==
Edition	Year	Dates	Headliners	Theme	Standard ticket price (₱)	Venue	Ref(s)
1	2013	May 18	The Temper Trap; Neon Trees; Nada Surf; Avalanche City; Colour Coding; Tully on Tully	Summer festival	3,000	Globe Circuit Event Grounds, Carmona, Makati	
2	2014	May 17	The Drums; The Paper Kites; The Royal Concept	Carnival	4,800	Globe Circuit Event Grounds, Carmona, Makati	
3	2015	April 25	Kid Cudi	Camp	5,500	Globe Circuit Event Grounds, Carmona, Makati	
4	2016	March 5	Death Cab for Cutie; Bon Iver; The Naked and Famous; San Cisco; Panama; Blackbird Blackbird	Outer space	4,800	Globe Circuit Event Grounds, Carmona, Makati	
5	2017	March 4	The Temper Trap; The Ting Tings; Explosions in the Sky; Yuna; Purity Ring	Jungle	5,500	Filinvest City Event Grounds, Alabang, Muntinlupa	
6	2018	March 10	Kodaline; Jhené Aiko; French Kiwi Juice; Daniel Caesar; Lauv	Arcade game	5,210	Filinvest City Event Grounds, Alabang, Muntinlupa	
7	2019	March 9–10	The Kooks; Two Door Cinema Club; Honne	Magic	7,000	Filinvest City Event Grounds, Alabang, Muntinlupa	
–	2020	March 7–8 (cancelled)	Foals; Chet Faker; Joji; Niki	Sports	6,000	Filinvest City Event Grounds, Alabang, Muntinlupa	
8	2023	March 4–5	Phoenix; Carly Rae Jepsen	Sports	8,500	Filinvest City Event Grounds, Alabang, Muntinlupa	
9	2024	March 9–10	Jack Johnson; Thundercat	Neighborhood	8,610	Filinvest City Event Grounds, Alabang, Muntinlupa	
10	2025	March 22–23	Daniel Caesar; Honne	"World of wonders" (10th anniversary special theme)	8,690	Filinvest City Event Grounds, Alabang, Muntinlupa	

== See also ==
- Clockenflap, a similar music festival held around the same time in Hong Kong
