= Munimuni =

Filipino indie folk band

- Also known as: The AJ Project (2013)
- Origin: Quezon City, Philippines
- Genres: Indie folk; indie rock; Makata pop
- Years active: 2012–2020; 2021–present
- Labels: Marilag Records and Production (2017-2020); Independent (2021–present); Sony Music Philippines (distribution; 2021–present)
- Members: Adj Jiao; John Owen Castro; Jolo Ferrer; Josh Tumaliuan; Ben Ayes
- Past members: Red Calayan (left 2018); TJ de Ocampo (left 2020)
- Website: ‣ Facebook; facebook.com/munitheband; ‣ Instagram; instagram.com/munitheband; ‣ Twitter; twitter.com/munitheband

Munimuni is a Filipino indie folk band from Quezon City, Philippines. The band currently consists of Adj Jiao (guitar, vocals), John Owen Castro (flute, vocals), Jolo Ferrer (bass), Josh Tumaliuan (drums), and Ben Ayes (guitar).

== History ==
=== Formation (2012–2013) ===
Munimuni was formed in UP Diliman, where TJ de Ocampo met Adj Jiao who was, at that time, doing a musical project with Red Calayan. They figured out that they had similar tastes in music, so they started writing and arranging songs together.

A year after their start, de Ocampo was sent to Japan as an exchange student, and the band added John Owen Castro as the band's session keyboardist. Munimuni kept on doing gigs while de Ocampo was away.

=== Simula EP (2017) ===
In 2017, Munimuni released their debut EP titled Simula. The EP featured the songs "Sa Hindi Pag-alala", "Sa'yo", and "Marilag".

=== Kulayan Natin (2019) ===
Two years after releasing their debut EP, Munimuni finally released their debut album. Titled Kulayan Natin, it featured the songs "Tahanan", "Oras", "Kalachuchi", and "Solomon" (featuring Filipina singer Clara Benin).

=== Hiatus (2020) ===
On September 30, 2020, the band announced on Twitter that they will be on a hiatus.

=== The comeback #MaligayaAngPagbabalik (2021) ===
On June 9, 2021, the band announced their comeback with a social media hashtag, along with a new song titled "Maligaya" and TJ de Ocampo's departure from the band.

== Band members ==
=== Current members ===
- Adj Jiao – guitar, lead vocals, backing vocals (2012–present); occasional drums (2023-present)
- John Owen Castro – flute, backing vocals, lead vocals (2014–present)
- Jolo Ferrer – bass, backing vocals (2017–present)
- Josh Tumaliuan – drums, backing vocals (2018–present); occasional lead vocals and guitar (2023-present)
- Ben Ayes - guitar (2023-present)

=== Past members ===
- Red Calayan - drums, backing vocals (2012–2018)
- TJ de Ocampo - guitar, lead vocals, backing vocals (2012–2020)

=== Session musicians ===
- Ian Tumaliuan - bass (2016-2017), guitar (2021-2022)
- Luke Sigua - drums

== Discography ==
=== Studio albums ===
- Kulayan Natin (2019)
- Alegorya (2024)

=== EPs ===
- Simula (2017)
- búhay/buháy (2021)

=== Singles ===
- "Tahanan" (2018)
- "Oras" (2018)
- "Kalachuchi" (2018)
- "Pop Machine: Minsan" (2019)
- "mga kantang isinulat mag-isa" (2020)
- "Talinghaga" (2020)
- "Alat" (2020)
- "Sanggol" (2020)
- "Maligaya" (2021)
- "Ambag Ko" (2021)
- Matimtiman (2022)
- Sikat ng Araw (2023)
- Kapayapaan (2023)
- Dito Muna (2023)

== Accolades ==
Year	Award	Category	Notable Works	Result	References
2020	5th Wish Music Awards	Wishclusive Collaboration of the Year	"Solomon"(with Clara Benin)	Nominated	
2020	5th Wish Music Awards	Wish Breakthrough Artist of the Year	"Munimuni"	Nominated	
