= Joey Ayala =

Filipino singer-songwriter (born 1956)

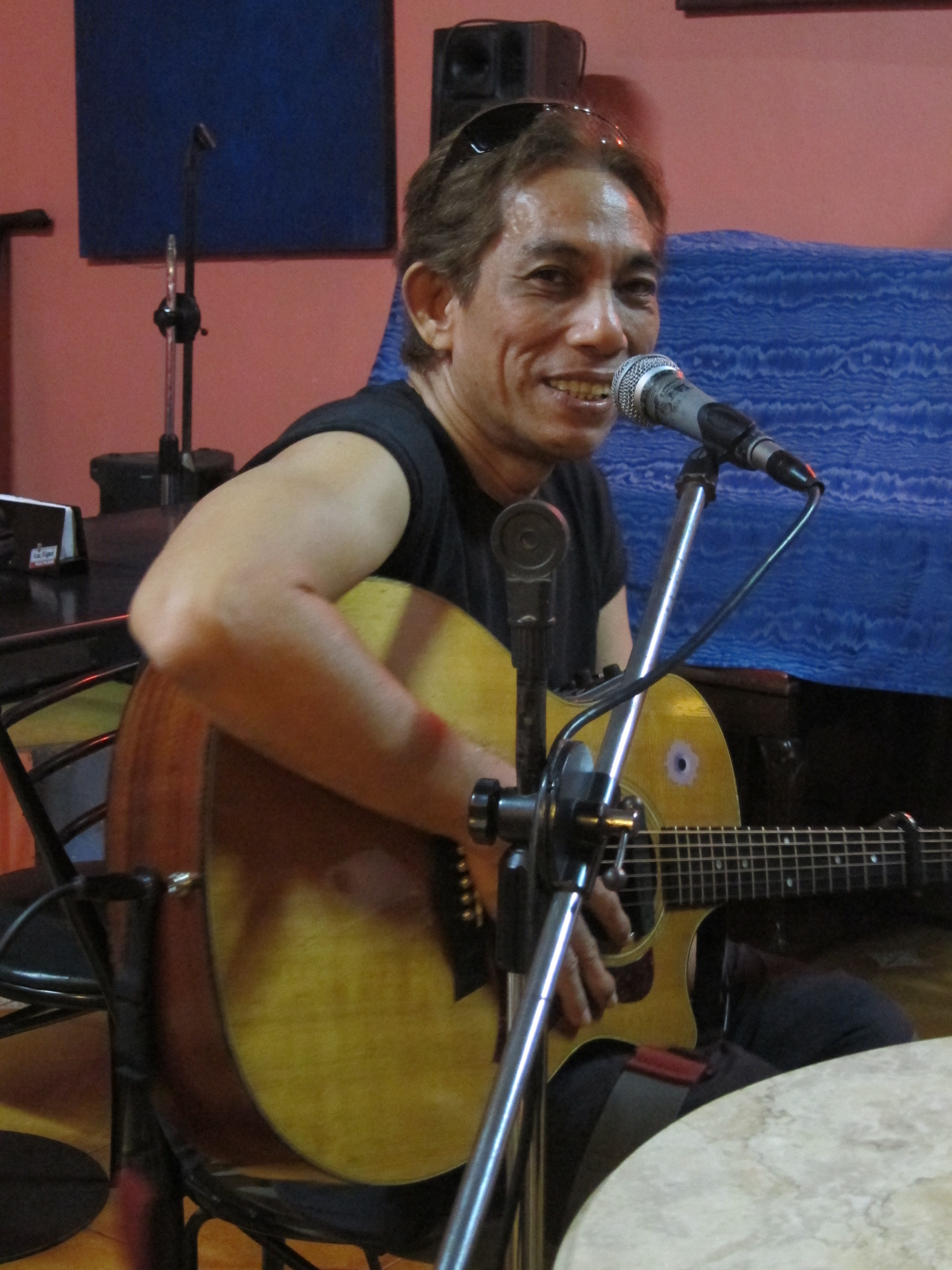
- Ayala performing at Conspiracy Bar in Quezon City

Background information
- Born: José Iñigo Homer Lacambra Ayala; June 1, 1956 (age 70); Bukidnon, Philippines
- Genres: Folk music Neofolk; Acoustic rock Kundiman; World music
- Occupations: singer, songwriter, musician
- Instruments: guitar, vocals, harmonica, percussion
- Years active: 1982-present
- Labels: Universal; Star Records
- Website: joeyayala.com

José Íñigo Homer Lacambra Ayala (born June 1, 1956), professionally known as Joey Ayala, is a Filipino singer-songwriter. A former journalist and copywriter, Ayala is considered among the most prominent folk musicians in the Philippines. He previously served as the chairman of the music committee of the National Commission for Culture and the Arts. He is well known for his style of music that combines the sounds of Filipino ethnic instruments with modern pop music. His public music life started when he released an album recorded in a makeshift studio in 1982 in Davao City. To date, he has released fourteen albums.

== Early life and education ==
Joey Ayala was born on June 1, 1956 to painter, fictionist and agriculturist Jose V. Ayala Jr. and poet Tita Lacambra.

As a child, Ayala grew up in Manila, attending the Ateneo de Manila High School in Quezon City. During his high school years, Ayala became addicted to drugs and began having suicidal tendencies. He later credited his first purchase of a guitar as having improved his situation, and by his senior year in high school, he began writing songs alongside his performance of songs by The Beatles, Neil Young and James Taylor. At the age of 17, Ayala moved with his family to Davao City in 1973 after his father became head of Hijo Plantation Inc.'s research division. Ayala later graduated from Ateneo de Davao with an economics degree, and was later hired by his college professor Alfredo Navarro Salanga to be a business journalist for the San Pedro Express.

== Career ==
In the mid-1980s, Ayala wrote the music for the stage musical Nukleyar II, staged by the Philippine Educational Theater Association (PETA).

Some of the Filipino ethnic instruments Ayala is known to use include the two-stringed Hegalong of the T'Boli people of Mindanao, the Kubing, the bamboo jaw harp found in various forms throughout the Philippines, and the 8-piece gong set, Kulintang, the melodic gong-rack of the indigenous peoples of the southern regions of the country. He also uses modern instruments in his music, such as the electric guitar, bass guitar, synthesizer/sequencer and drums.

The name of his band "Bagong Lumad" literally means "New Native", a name and philosophy that was carried over into Bagong Lumad Artists Foundation, Inc. (www.blafi.org), now a "UNDP Responsible Party" working on SiningBayan (Social Artistry) capacity-building projects with the Civil Service Commission, the Department of Education, and other GOs and NGOs in the Philippines. He served as the (2008–10) Chairman and Vice-Chairman (2011–13) of the National Committee on Music under the National Commission for Culture and the Arts.

In 2013, Ayala entered the second Philippine Popular Music Festival as a composer and interpreter for the song, "Papel", where it vied as one of its twelve finalists. The song featured collaborations with rapper Gloc-9 and guest vocals by Denise Barbacena. He previously participated in 2012 as an interpreter for the song "Piso" written by Kristofferson Melecio.

In 2014, Ayala was featured in the BBC Travel episode featuring the Philippines.

== Personal life ==
=== Political views ===
Ayala is a supporter of 16th Philippine president Rodrigo Duterte, aligning with him on the question of federalism ("Federalism is at least a step closer to politics-according-to-Nature") and deeming him to be rude yet "transparent". He also expressed that his support comes from recognizing himself in Duterte. In May 2016, he stated that "For better or worse his presidency will AT LEAST be more entertaining and less predictable than the straight line[...] trajectory of media-whipped, Philippine patronage politics. People Power Potential is at its peak when unpredictability reigns. Stability is only a sign that the powerful are snug as bugs in a rug."

== Discography ==
=== Albums ===
==== Solo and Joey Ayala at ang Bagong Lumad ====
- Panganay ng Umaga (1985)
- Magkabilaan (1987)
- Mga Awit ng Tanod-lupa (1991)
- Lumad sa Syudad (1995)
- Lupa't Langit (1997)
- 16 Love Songs
- Awit ng Magdaragat
- Organik
- Basta May Saging
- JoeyAyala: RAW
- Encantada (Music from a Ballet Philippines dance-drama, 1992.)
- Parol (Music from a Ballet Philippines Christmas dance-drama, 1995.)
- Palay Bigas Kanin (A multi-artist collaborative album directed by Ayala, 2010. Available for educational use via the web.)
- Sita at Rama (In collaboration with sibling Cynthia Alexander. Music for a puppet theater production by Amelia Lapena Bonifacio.)

==== As musical director ====
- Ayayayayay (Popong Landero ug ang Bag-ong Lumad, 1988)

=== Singles ===
- "Tabi Po"
- "Bankerohan"
- "Papel" (A Song Finalist Of PhilPop Festival 2013)
- "Magkaugnay (Ang Lahat ng Bagay)" (Released By Universal Records)
- "Karaniwang Tao"

=== Music videos ===
- Tabi Po (Released by Star Music, 1995)
- Papel (Released by Universal Records)

== Accolades and citations ==
- Fr. Neri Satur Award for Environmental Heroism "For promoting environmental awareness and arts education from ancestral roots to new artistic routes of musical expression advocating for the protection of the environment and the conservation of natural resources." (Awarded by the National Commission for Culture and the Arts and the Department of Education, April 24, 2009, in observance of Earth Day 2009.)
- Best Musical Score Brutus, independent film by Tara Illenberger, awarded by Cinemalaya, 2008.
- Benigno S. Aquino, Jr. Award for Social Artistry (Joey Ayala) has taught the young generations through his well-celebrated songs, the essence of communion and community, of compassion and service, and of human dignity. He exemplified through his most ordinary actions what it means to be a man of God and a man for others. His passionate commitment to music in teaching values makes him a genuine model of social artistry. Given this 18th day of August 2007, at the University of the Philippines National College of Public Administration and Governance (UP-NCPAG), Quezon City. (Conferred by the Federation of Catholic Schools’ Alumni/ae Associations – FeCaSAA - in partnership with the Good Citizenship Movement – GCM.)
- Best Traditional Song, 8th KATHA Music Awards, Songwriter, lyrics of "Pag-uwi", 16 November 2002.
- Grand Prize, Metropop Songwriting Contest, lyricist of "Pag-uwi", music by Louie Ocampo, interpreted by Martin Nievera. 2001.
- Best Movie Theme, “Walang Hanggang Paalam”, used in the film Bagong Buwan by Marilou Diaz-Abaya. 2001.
- Gawad Urian, Pinakamahusay na Musika, mula sa Manunuri ng Pelikulang Pilipino Best Music Award, Philippine Movie Critics, for the film Batang Westside by Lav Diaz.
- Datu Bago Award "For being an outstanding composer-performer-bandleaderlyricist, arranger, writer who has defined the ethnic character of Mindanao music that he renders magnificently well using his voice and indigenous instruments resulting in the consciousness of the Filipino soul of intimations of its moral values and environmental responsibilities." (Awarded by the City of Davao, 2000, 63rd Araw ng Dabaw.)
- National Fellow for Poetry, University of the Philippines, 1999.
- Best World Music Vocal Performance, KATHA. “D’yos, D’yos” by Tata Betita, interpreted by Joey Ayala for the 1998 MetroPop Music contest.
- Philippines Free Press Annual Literary Award 2nd Prize Winner, Short Story Category, "Life & Times on Chicken Avenue" awarded 24 January 2000, Mandarin Oriental Hotel, Makati.
- Special Philippine Centennial Citation "For creating distinctively Filipino music rooted in ethnic rhythms of power and artistry that draws the collective consciousness particularly of the youth to gravitate on environmental and socio-political issues in a profound but entertaining manner. His music and performance art give world-class exposure and glory to our noble Lumads, our National Bird and our country." (Awarded by the City of Davao, 1998.)
- Special MAGIS Award for Outstanding Alumni "For creating music that delineates the unique Filipino soul, for defining the ethnic character of Philippine music through the use of native instruments, especially in harmony with foreign instruments like drums and acoustic guitar, and for awakening in the Filipino an awareness of its own heritage as a people." (Awarded by Ateneo de Manila University, 1996.)
- Gawad ng Pagkilala "Dahil sa paglikha ng mga awiting mayaman sa pagpapahalagang moral sa wikang Filipino at paglalapat ng musika sa pamamagitan ng katutubong mga instrumento... nakatutulong sa pagpapayabong at pagpapaunlad ng wika at kalinangang Pilipino." (Mula sa Komisyon ng Wikang Pilipino, 1993.)
- Special citation "For providing inspiration to the youth and progressive movements committed to ecological wholeness, justice and peace through music and song." (Awarded by Concerned Women of the Philippines, 1992.)
- The Outstanding Young Men (TOYM) Award "For humanitarian efforts directed towards the two objectives of art - as relevant socially-oriented medium and as aesthetic principle"; accompanied by the Gerry Roxas Leadership Medal (awarded by The Philippine Jaycees, 1989)
- Gawad Malayang Pilipino "Dahilan sa kanyang di matatawarang ambag sa paglilinang ng kamalayang makabansa sa pamamagitan ng kanyang mga musika." (For his outstanding contributions for enriching the nationalistic awareness through music) (awarded by University of Makati, 2017)

Year	Award giving body	Category	Nominated work	Results
1998	NU Rock Awards	Rock Video of the Year	"Tabi Po"	Won
