= December Avenue discography =

- Studio albums: 2
- EPs: 2
- Live albums: 1
- Singles: 28
- Music videos: 10
- Collaborative singles: 1
- Promotional singles: 4

Filipino indie pop/alternative rock band December Avenue has released two studio albums, one live album, two extended plays (EPs), twenty-eight singles, four promotional singles and ten music videos. The group is composed of Zel Bautista on vocals and guitars, Jem Manuel on guitars, Don Gregorio on bass, Jet Danao on drums and backing vocals, and Gelo Cruz on keyboards and backing vocals.

== Albums ==
=== Studio albums ===
December Avenue
- Released: February 15, 2016 (PH)
- Label: Tower of Doom
- Formats: CD, digital download

No.	Title	Writer(s)	Length
1.	"City Lights"		4:22
2.	"Sleep Tonight"		4:49
3.	"Fallin'" (featuring Clara Benin)		4:10
4.	"Ears and Rhymes"		3:16
5.	"I'll Be Watching You"	Bautista	4:31
6.	"Back to Love"		4:34
7.	"Eroplanong Papel"	Bautista	5:03
8.	"Dive"		2:55
9.	"Forever"		3:34
10.	"Breathe Again"		3:42
11.	"Time To Go"		4:21
Total length:			45:17

Langit Mong Bughaw
- Released: December 20, 2019 (PH)
- Label: Tower of Doom
- Formats: CD, digital download, LP

No.	Title	Length
1.	"Sa Ngalan Ng Pag-Ibig" (Piano Version)	5:42
2.	"Kahit 'Di Mo Alam"	4:42
3.	"Huling Sandali"	5:43
4.	"Magkunwari ('Di Man Tayo)"	4:38
5.	"Bulong"	4:30
6.	"Kahit Sa Panaginip" (featuring Khalil Ramos)	3:51
7.	"Sa Ngalan Ng Pag-Ibig"	4:45
8.	"Dahan"	4:57
9.	"Kung 'Di Rin Lang Ikaw" (featuring Moira Dela Torre)	4:27
10.	"Sa Paghimig Mo"	3:56
11.	"Muling Magbabalik"	4:49
Total length:		52:00

=== Live albums ===
For the Roadies (Tower Sessions Live)
- Released: July 19, 2020 (PH)
- Label: Tower of Doom
- Formats: digital download

No.	Title	Length
1.	"Bulong (Tower Sessions Live)"	5:47
2.	"Breathe Again (Tower Sessions Live)"	4:32
3.	"Fallin' (Tower Sessions Live)"	4:21
4.	"Kahit 'Di Mo Alam (Tower Sessions Live)"	4:51
5.	"Ears and Rhymes (Tower Sessions Live)"	3:44
6.	"Sleep Tonight (Tower Sessions Live)"	5:09
7.	"Bakas Ng Talampakan (Tower Sessions Live)"	4:21
8.	"Huling Sandali (Tower Sessions Live)"	5:46
9.	"Kung 'Di Rin Lang Ikaw (Tower Sessions Live)"	5:19
10.	"Sa Ngalang Ng Pag-Ibig (Tower Sessions Live)"	5:17
Total length:		49:07

== Extended plays ==
Time to Go EP
- Released: 2010
- Label: Tower of Doom
- Formats: CD, digital download

No.	Title	Length
1.	"Time To Go"	4:27
2.	"Candles"	4:45
3.	"World On My Shoulder"	2:33
4.	"Moon Song"	2:18
Total length:		14:03

Sleep Tonight EP
- Released: 2011
- Label: Tower of Doom
- Formats: CD, digital download

No.	Title	Writer(s)	Length
1.	"Sleep Tonight"		4:42
2.	"I’ll Be Watching You"	Bautista	4:07
3.	"World On My Shoulder"		2:33
4.	"City Lights"		4:18
Total length:			15:40

== Singles ==
=== As lead artist ===
List of singles as lead artist, showing year released, selected chart positions, and associated albums
Title	Year	Peak chart positions		Album
Title	Year	PHL	TPS	Album
"Time To Go"	2010	–	–	Time to Go EP
"Breathe Again"	2013	–	–	December Avenue
"Sa Ngalan Ng Pag-Ibig"	2017	78	–	Langit Mong Bughaw
"Kahit 'Di Mo Alam"	2017	–	–	Langit Mong Bughaw
"Bulong"	2018	20	21	Langit Mong Bughaw
"Kung 'Di Rin Lang Ikaw" (featuring Moira Dela Torre)	2018	–	–	Langit Mong Bughaw
"Magkunwari ('Di Man Tayo)"	2019	–	–	Langit Mong Bughaw
"Dahan"	2019	–	–	Langit Mong Bughaw
"Huling Sandali"	2019	–	–	Langit Mong Bughaw
"Kahit Sa Panaginip"	2019	–	–	Langit Mong Bughaw
"Sa Panaginip Mo"	2019	–	–	Langit Mong Bughaw
"Muling Magbabalik"	2019	–	–	Langit Mong Bughaw
"Bakas Ng Talampakan"	2020	–	–	Non-album singles
"Polaris"	2020	–	–	Non-album singles
"Unfamiliar"	2020	–	–	Non-album singles
"Drive"	2020	–	–	Non-album singles
"Isang Himala"	2021	–	–	Non-album singles
"Saksi Ang Langit"	2022	3	2	Non-album singles
"Ilang Beses Kita Mamahalin?"	2023	–	–	Non-album singles
"Wala Nang Iba" (featuring Belle Mariano)	2023	–	–	Non-album singles
"In My Arms Is Where I'll Keep You"	2023	–	–	Non-album singles
"Face of God"	2024	–	–	Non-album singles
"Paraya"	2024	–	–	Non-album singles
"Ahon" (featuring Morissette)	2025	–	–	Non-album singles

=== Collaborative singles ===
List of collaborative singles by December Avenue
Title	Year	Other acts	Ref.
"Summer Song"	2018	Gracenote; Autotelic	

=== Promotional singles ===
List of promotional singles by December Avenue
Title	Year	Album	Ref.
"Kahit Sa Panaginip" (with Khalil Ramos)	2018	Non-album singles	
"Kung Ako Nalang Sana" (Note: Cover version of the song by Bituin Escalante)	2018	Non-album singles	
"Jingle Bells x Deck The Halls" (with Khalil Ramos)	2018	Non-album singles	
"Tadhana" (with Just Hush)	2019	Non-album singles	

=== Special releases ===
List of special singles released by December Avenue
Title	Year	Album	Ref.
"I Don't Wanna Wait" (Note: Cover version of the song by Paula Cole)	2011	Non-album singles	
"Paskong Alaala"	2017	Non-album singles	
"Sa Dulo Ng Walang Hanggan (Sa Ngalan Ng Pag-Ibig Piano Version)"	2018	Non-album singles	
"Umaaraw, Umuulan" (Note: Cover version of the song by Rivermaya)	2020	Rico Blanco Songbook	
