= Steve Badiola =

Filipino musician

- Born: Steve Frank Badiola
- Origin: Laguna, Philippines
- Genres: Emo; post-hardcore; alternative rock; indie folk
- Occupations: Musician; singer; songwriter
- Instruments: Vocals; guitars
- Years active: 1999–present
- Member of: Typecast; singsmetosleep

Steve Frank Badiola is a Filipino singer-songwriter, musician and one of the founding members of the rock band Typecast, which formed in 1999. He also releases music under the name singsmetosleep as a solo project.

== Early life ==
Badiola was hailed from Laguna, Philippines. His parents were instrumentalists, which made him develop an interest in music. He mostly taught himself to play the guitar.

== Career ==
=== Typecast ===
Badiola began performing with Typecast in 1999, when he was around 17 years old. The band has released songs including "Will You Ever Learn", "Last Time", and "Another Minute Until Ten".

Badiola has recorded several albums and EPs with Typecast, including Last Time (2002), The Infatuation Is Always There (2004), Every Moss and Cobweb (2006), How Your Influence Betrays You (2011), Word Sits Heavy (2014), and We Sits Heavy (2020). (Note: Typecast also released the EPs Gush and Lionheart in 2026. No detailed sources about the releases' background were found, although both EPs are listed on Apple Music.) The band's fifth album Eulogy was scheduled for release on October 23, 2026. During the recording of the album The Infatuation Is Always There (2004), Badiola worked with producers Raymund Marasigan and Diego Castillo, who helped him improve his vocal performances in the studio.

In 2018, Typecast released "Perfect Posture", a song that deals with mental health. Badiola discussed the importance of expressing anxiety and other emotions through music and said he wanted listeners to take mental health seriously.

=== Solo project ===
Badiola also releases music under the name singsmetosleep, a solo project separate from his work with Typecast. On June 14, 2019, he collaborated with Biboy Renia of Join the Club and Jeff Bolivar of Soapdish on the song "Maraming Makikinig".

He released his first solo single, "Home", on April 30, 2020. The song has a softer sound than Typecast's music, with acoustic guitar and electronic elements. Badiola has described his solo work as drawing from indie folk, ambient music, and neofolk, as well as his interest in electronic music.

Badiola said that he had written and recorded solo songs even before Typecast began. He decided to release some of these songs separately because their "softer sound" did not fit the band's music. He also discussed plans for a remix version of "Home" featuring other musicians and expressed interest in releasing a solo album.

In December 2024, Badiola released the solo single "Windmills". On February 21, 2025, he released an acoustic version of "Will You Ever Learn".

On February 20, 2026, he released "All We Know", his first original solo single since "Windmills".

== Personal life ==
In 2021, Badiola was hospitalized after a hit-and-run accident. He sustained injuries to his knee and the right side of his head and face and required surgery for his knee.

== Discography ==
=== Solo singles ===
- "Home" (2020)
- "Windmills" (2024)
- "Will You Ever Learn" (acoustic version, 2025)
- "All We Know" (2026)

=== Collaborations ===
- "Maraming Makikinig" (with Biboy Renia and Jeff Bolivar, 2019)

== Awards and nominations ==
Year	Award-giving body	Category	Nominated work	Result
2007	NU Rock Awards	Vocalist of the Year	Steve Badiola	Nominated
2007	NU Rock Awards	Guitarist of the Year	Steve Badiola	Nominated
