= Kaguluhan Music Festival =

Pinoy rock and heavy metal music festival

- Genre: Pinoy rock, heavy metal
- Locations: Cavite, Philippines
- Years active: 2004-2013, 2018

The Kaguluhan Music Festival was a Pinoy rock and heavy metal music event held every November mostly in the province of Cavite, in the Philippines. Organized by a small event production outfit, the music festival has, since its inception, contributed to the success of its local talents; some have become recording artists, while others have opened for international acts.

The festival's name, Kaguluhan, is a Tagalog word for "frenzy" or "commotion". The organizers adopted the name as a metaphor and sarcastic catch phrase visually describing the rock and metal scene; uncompromising yet fun and organic.

== History ==
Founded by musician and head organizer Edzel Rebamontan, the music festival's purpose is to give fresh and potential bands from Cavite an opportunity to showcase their talents and skills to a whole new level of entertainment and excitement by giving them the publicity and promotion they need in pursuing their dreams to become the next rock act in the local music scene. It also serves as a training ground to enhance their performance level, original material and interaction with the crowd, together with some of the hottest local Rock and Metal bands that will be sharing the same stage with them. The event organizers are composed of local musicians and volunteers as they face a six-month preparation prior to the event, from securing venue permits, talent scouting, marketing, merchandising and promoting.

The music event's official logo

== Event leg ==
The first installment was held on October 15, 2004, at the Cavite Coliseum where cockfights are also held. The debut was considered a failure due to the production's high cost and poor marketing strategy of its previous managers and staff. The producers then were uncertain whether the event would ever be staged again, due to the losses suffered.

The second year was held at a small bar in Bacoor, Cavite, at a toned-down production cost which eventually gained the production more knowledge and wisdom, unlike the previous year. The production decided to stage the music festival every November in order not to compete with other events which were held in the month of October. Uncredited bands also got an opportunity to perform but were never officially headlined or got any billing in the show's promotional ads. Afterwards, the production reduced the talent line-up, limiting it to at least only ten bands to avoid over-billing.

Moshpit in the cockpit - festival-goers slam dance to a frenzy at the Cavite Coliseum where the first Kaguluhan Music Festival was held

Hundreds of festival patrons at the 2008 Kaguluhan Music Festival

The third year was held at the Imus plaza gymnasium in Imus, Cavite, where the production concluded that their struggle since the first year had finally paid off as Kaguluhan's hype incredibly increased, thanks to the growing fan base and followers of its homegrown artists among the well-known established acts who also joined the festival.

The fourth year was held at an auditorium near a public wet market in Noveleta, Cavite, where the event debuted its first ever vanity wall where spectators got the chance to take pictures of themselves in front of it or with their rock idols as well. The production also revitalized their official social networking pages and uploaded countless streaming videos that includes a retrospective highlight reel, video blogs and a profile video featuring in-depth interviews with some band members and personalities involved, giving their personal insights and testimonials to the festival's growing success which are viewed and posted on YouTube.

The fifth year was held at the Cavite School of St. Mark in front of SM City Bacoor. Spectators from different municipalities from Cavite and Metro Manila came to witness history as the attendance record of the previous four events was broken by an estimated total of seven hundred patrons. The performing bands experienced tears of joy as the crowd sang along with their original songs while some were moshing, and others stage diving. Some vocalists accidentally broke the wooden center stage floor raising the massive crowd up to their feet. According to some spectators, the media, and even celebrities begin to take notice of the annually held music festival; some of the big music events held prior to Kaguluhan have even moved their scheduled dates either to witness or feel its enormously growing reputation in the music scene.

In the wake of its sixth year, the organizers hope that other event production outfits from different regions would step up and most importantly, help their fellow unsigned artists from their respective region fulfill their goals to become the next big thing in the local music scene making sure those talents gets exposed everywhere.

The seventh year broke the attendance of the fifth year with at least 1,200 attendees to cheer on their hometown heroes and welcomed guests from Manila by charging the crash barriers and forming epic mosh pits until the wee hours of the morning, creating just enough of a ruckus and racket for the entire country to see and hear and proving once more that the best bands in the land were at their own backyards.

The eighth year introduced a next generation of bands and a new venue at the Bacoor coliseum in Molino, which featured a more solid technical production of sound and lights, and better acoustics for all the bands who played. It was also said to believe that it would be the last Kaguluhan event to be held in Cavite, as it explores the possibilities and opportunities in finding new places and venues in the future and introduce more upcoming bands outside the region.

The ninth year was held at the Pasay city sports complex and introduced a new set of local acts from different parts in the land led by Paramita, Piledriver, Bought by Blood, Serefamus, Exillion, Penguin along with Cavite bands Fherrond, Sucketseven and Anak Dalita. It also marked the first time for Kaguluhan to have held the event on the nation's capital of Manila and headlined by an international metal band Shepherds The Weak.

== Final leg and legacy ==
In the summer of 2013, musicians and personalities who had participated at Kaguluhan disclosed to social networking sites that the festival's upcoming tenth anniversary would also be its final installment, as its head organizer (Rebamontan) announced his retirement and ventures to other opportunities besides music. With that news, public clamor from its loyal attendees and followers demanded the production to conclude the music festival in Cavite as a result of the event's ninth-leg trip to Pasay and the negative reception of a short-lived competing rock event organized by a small group of former event headliners.

After weeks of brainstorming, the producers returned to Cavite not just of the intention of concluding Kaguluhan, but by launching two new music events that would carry the values and traditions of what the music festival had established. The two events entitled "Skoolampagan" and "Imusikahan" was held on November 9 and 23 at the Cavite School of St. Mark and the Imus plaza gymnasium, created and organized by production volunteers led by event host Allen Estrada and Kaguluhan co-founding member Jeff Bernales.

On Kaguluhan's 15th year, one of its pioneering bands announced the festival's return for one commemorative show and help conclude Imusikahan's five year run in the Cavite music scene. The event featured a new generation of bands discovered from the outgoing event led by: Trece, 300 Violin Orchestra, Los Pollos Hermanos, Clockwork Orange, Save The Fall and 123 Pikit. Bands that also joined, are fellow Kaguluhan alumni acts: Deepsleep, Kaikatsuna, Starscream and Imbue No Kudos.

== Concert film ==
On August 1, 2009, the filmmakers together with the music festival's event organizing team held a special screening of Kaguluhan Music Festival: The documentary event experience which was filmed in November 2008. The concert film earned an R rating from the MTRCB and was well received by its attendees; the filmmakers have fixed the month of November for its initial home video release for a limited time and supply only.

== Performer lineup ==
Headline bands	Date	Venue
Greyhoundz, A.D.A. (Aggressive Dog Attack), Sin, Stagnant, Starscream	October 15, 2004	Bacoor, Cavite
Fingertrap, Salin Mana, Katoliko, Badburn, Typecast	November 19, 2005	Bacoor, Cavite
Queso, Death By Stereo, Balatek, Sultans of Snap, Stilth, Sleptic, Kaikatsuna	November 4, 2006	Imus, Cavite
Bloodshedd, Cog, Tragedy 42, Intolerant, Burn Your Lies	November 10, 2007	Noveleta, Cavite
Valley of Chrome, Imbue No Kudos, Deepsleep, The Lost Child, Enfilade	November 8, 2008	Bacoor, Cavite
Dr. Crowley, Langiz, Subculture, Even, Skychurch	November 7, 2009	Bacoor, Cavite
Ozawa, Method, Descant Gott, Mortal Fear, Zero 46	November 13, 2010	Bacoor, Cavite
Ugahab, Anak Dalita, Nuclear Punishment, Arcadia, Farplane, Carnophage, Dei Filius	November 5, 2011	Molino, Cavite
Shepherds The Weak, Paramita, Penguin, Fherrond, Bought by Blood, Exillion, Serefamus, Sucketseven, Piledriver	November 10, 2012	Pasay, Metro Manila
Dogfight, Sagrado, Hateure, At Times Provoked, Reklamo	November 9, 2013	Bacoor, Cavite
Salt Circa, Paint A Sky, New Material, A Year of Agony Ends, Curbside, Coven	November 23, 2013	Imus, Cavite
Trece, 300 Violin Orchestra, Los Pollos Hermanos, Clockwork Orange, Save The Fall, 123 Pikit	November 10, 2018	Bacoor, Cavite
