= Valley of Chrome =

Filipino heavy metal band

- Valley of Chrome in 2023. From left to right: Marcelino, Borreros, Africa, Eusebio, Constantino.

Background information
- Also known as: Batch 98
- Origin: Laguna, Philippines
- Genres: Metalcore; nu metal; thrash metal; hardcore punk
- Years active: 2000–present
- Labels: Viva; Tower of Doom; Eikon Records
- Members: Tatel Marcelino; Elijah Borreros; Jordan Constantino; Paul Eusebio; Rogel Africa (Note: Indefinite hiatus)
- Past members: Kaloi Cambiliza; Jericho; Jervee; Kimmy Baraoidan; Jethro Mendoza; Voltaire del Rosario
- Website: valleyofchrome.com
- Logo

Valley of Chrome is a Filipino heavy metal band based in Laguna formed in 2000. The band's lineup consists of lead guitarists Tatel Marcelino and Elijah Borreros, bass guitar Jordan Constantino, and drums Paul Eusebio, while vocalist Rogel Africa went on an indefinite hiatus in January 2024 after moving to the United States.

The band has released sixth studio albums between 2004 and 2026, and five extended plays (EPs) between 2001 and 2024. In 2019, Valley of Chrome became the first all-Filipino band to perform at Wacken Open Air in Germany. The band began during the rise of nu metal and later added elements of hardcore punk and thrash metal to its music. It has released albums in both English and Filipino. In 2022, the band won an Awit Award for Best Rock/Alternative Recording for its song "Mahirap Mahalin", which was released in 2021.

== History ==
=== Formation and early releases (2000–2017) ===
Valley of Chrome was formed during 2000 in Laguna by four musicians, including vocalist Jericho, guitarist Jervee, bassist Jordan Constantino, and drummer Kimmy Baraoidan, under the name Batch 98, and later changed its name to Valley of Chrome, when Rogel Africa and Jethro Mendoza joined the band as a co-vocalist and guitarist. The name was taken from the song "Valley of Chrome" by American hip-hop group Cypress Hill. The band released its debut extended play (EP) Beyond Definition in 2001.

In 2002, Jericho and Jervee left the band, and Tatel Marcelino joined as its guitarist. The band released two EPs in its early years, including Transparent in 2002 and Anthems for the Sell-Out Youth in 2003, before signing with Viva Records in 2004. In 2003, Voltaire del Rosario joined the band, replacing Baraoidan as its drummer. In 2004, the band released its debut album Love and Devotion, and toured with fellow bands Chicosci and Typecast to promote the album.

In 2007, the band returned to Tower of Doom, (Note: Tower of Doom's website does not state the year when the band first signed with the label.) which its became part of the Filipino underground metal scene and later released Never the Lifeless in 2007. The band participated in the 2007 and 2008 editions of the Siege Tour, and the song "Forever Young" (2004) from the album Love and Devotion became an informal anthem for the bands that took part in the tour. After releasing Never the Lifeless, the band took a break from recording.

In 2009, del Rosario left the band, and Paul Eusebio later joined as its drummer.

The band returned with its self-titled album, released in 2012, produced by vocalist Africa and Tower of Doom's co-founder and producer Eric Perlas.

In 2014, the band released its fourth EP Dark Horse, which includes a re-recorded version of "Vengeance Unleashed" from its 2002 EP Transparent and a cover of Rumblebelly's "Anino" featuring vocalist Alvin Baes. That year, Kaloi Cambaliza joined the band as a guitarist after Mendoza left.

In 2017, the band was described by the Philippine Daily Inquirer as one of the pioneers of metalcore in the Philippines. That year, the band was chosen to support American metalcore band Miss May I during its first performance in the Philippines at the Skydome in Quezon City.

=== International performances and Victorious (2018–2020) ===
In July 2018, Valley of Chrome performed at Hammersonic, a heavy metal festival in Jakarta, Indonesia. At the time, the band had released five extended plays and three full-length albums. Its lineup included vocalist Rogel Africa, guitarists Tatel Marcelino and Kaloi Cambeliza, bassist Jordan Constantino, and drummer Paul Eusebio.

The band released its fourth studio album Victorious on February 22, 2019, and contains 10 tracks and was described by Africa as the band's heaviest release at that time. Its cover was created by Brazilian artist Marcelo Vasco, who had also worked on album covers for several international metal bands. That year, the band performed at Wacken Open Air in Germany. It was reported as the first all-Filipino band to perform at the festival. In 2020, Valley of Chrome performed online for Wacken Worldwide.

=== Later releases and Rogel Africa's hiatus (2021–present) ===
In December 2021, Valley of Chrome released the single "Mahirap Mahalin" through Tower of Doom.

On July 28, 2022, the band released Confront Thy Curse, a fifth studio album. The album includes six new songs in both English and Filipino, along with previously released singles and re-recorded versions of earlier songs. The band worked on the album remotely during the COVID-19 pandemic and completed the recordings with Perlas. That year, Cambaliza took an indefinite leave from the band to move to Canada, while musician and internet personality Elijah Borreros, also known as Pinuno, joined the band as a guitarist.

In November 2023, the band's album Victorious was prepared for a vinyl release by independent label Eikon Records. The release featured red and black splatter vinyl, an embossed cover, and a poster. On December 29, Valley of Chrome announced that Africa would leave the Philippines to move to the United States. His final show with the band was scheduled for January 13, 2024, at Balcony Music House in Makati. The band described his departure as an indefinite hiatus and said it would continue writing music with him remotely.

In 2024, the band released its fifth EP For Tomorrow Is Never Promised, which includes "Boses", "Walang Takot", and "Luha ng Kaaway". It was recorded by Symoun Durias and mixed and mastered by Macoy Manuel.

In 2026, the band released its sixth studio album Heart-fueled Machine.

== Artistry and influences ==
Valley of Chrome's music has been described as incorporating elements of nu metal, hardcore punk, metalcore, and thrash metal, with influences from hard rock and pop. The band has released songs in both English and Filipino. The song "Never the Lifeless" (2007) was described by Billboard Philippines as a "thrash anthem".

The band's influences include In Flames, Atreyu, Shadows Fall, Killswitch Engage, Metallica, Iron Maiden, and Guns N' Roses.

== Members ==
=== Current members ===
- Tatel Marcelino – guitar (2002–present)
- Elijah "Pinuno" Borreros – guitar (2022–present)
- Jordan Constantino – bass guitar (2000–present)
- Paul Eusebio – drums (2009–present)
- Rogel Africa – vocals (2000–2024)

=== Former members ===
- Kaloi Cambaliza – guitar (2014–2022)
- Jericho – vocals (2000–2002)
- Jervee – guitar (2000–2002)
- Kimmy Baraoidan – drums (2000–2003)
- Jethro Mendoza – guitar (2000–2014)
- Voltaire del Rosario – drums (2003–2009)

Timeline

== Discography ==
=== EPs ===
- Beyond Definition (2001)
- Transparent (2002)
- Anthems for the Sell-out Youth (2003)
- Dark Horse (2014)
- For Tomorrow Is Never Promised (2024)

=== Studio albums ===
- Love and Devotion (2004)
- Never the Lifeless (2007)
- Valley of Chrome (2012)
- Victorious (2019)
- Confront Thy Curse (2022)
- Heart-fueled Machine (2026)

== Accolades ==
Award	Year	Category	Recipient	Result	Ref.
Awit Awards	2022	Best Rock/Alternative Recording	"Mahirap Mahalin"	Won	
