= Zel Bautista =

Filipino musician

- Born: Ronzel Benedict Bautista
- Genres: Indie pop; pop rock; alternative rock; acoustic rock; OPM
- Occupations: Musician; songwriter
- Instruments: Vocals; guitar
- Years active: 2007–present
- Labels: Tower of Doom
- Member of: December Avenue; Above Velvet Air
- Spouse: Patricia Cruz (m. 2023)
- Website: zelbautista.com

Ronzel Benedict Bautista is a Filipino musician known as the lead vocalist and guitarist of the rock band December Avenue. He also launched a solo project under the moniker Above Velvet Air, which debuted with the independently released single "Close to Me" (2025).

== Career ==
Bautista began his music career in 2007 as a founding member of December Avenue, a band formed while he was studying at the University of Santo Tomas. Along with fellow students from the UST's Conservatory of Music, Jem Manuel on lead guitar, Don Gregorio on bass, and Jet Danao on drums, while Bautista served as the band's vocalist and guitarist.

In 2018, the band collaborated with Moira Dela Torre on the single "Kung Di Rin Lang Ikaw" (lit. 'If It Couldn't Be You'), was later featured in the 2019 film Hello, Love, Goodbye. In the same year, they released their second studio album Langit Mong Bughaw, which compiled several of their previously released tracks from 2017.

In 2024, Bautista collaborated with the band Gracenote on the single "Balang Araw ay Mapapangiti" (lit. 'Someday You Will Smile'), was released under EMI Records Philippines.

In 2025, Bautista introduced his solo project under the moniker Above Velvet Air, marking a new chapter in his musical journey. The project debuted with the independently released single "Close to Me". In November, Bautista is set to headline his own solo concert tour in Canada. Announced as The Velvet Tour, the schedule lists shows in Calgary on November 8, followed by McMurray on November 13 and Edmonton on November 15, before wrapping up with a final date in Montreal on November 23.

== Personal life ==
In 2023, Bautista married Patricia Cruz. They had a first child was born in 2024.

== Discography ==
=== As solo artist (Above Velvet Air) ===
List of singles as solo artist, showing year released and album name
Title	Year	PHL	Album
"Close to Me"	2025	—	Non-single album
"Moon Song"	2025	—	Non-single album
"Of Anchor and Fire"	2025	—	Non-single album
"—" denotes releases that did not chart or were not released in that region.

=== Collaborations ===
List of collaborative singles
Title	Year	PHL	Artist(s)	Album
"Balang Araw ay Mapapangiti"	2024	—	Gracenote and Zel Bautista	—
"—" denotes releases that did not chart or were not released in that region.
