= CHNDTR =

Filipino music project

- Origin: Manila, Philippines
- Genres: Pop punk; alternative rock; OPM
- Years active: 2016–2025 (as a band); 2025–present (solo project)
- Labels: Tower of Doom; UMG Philippines; (EMI Records)
- Members: Chin Detera
- Past members: Niko Bacani; Sean de Leon; Benjo Criste; Zach Alcasid; Dani Pajarillo II; Kyle Ynion; Clyde Tibayan; Kit de Gala; Joko Reantaso; Gabriel Luis; Eldrich Tabangcura

CHNDTR (pronounced Chin Detera) is a Filipino music project from Manila, Philippines. Originally established as a rock band, it was formed in 2016. The project transitioned into a solo act in 2025 under the direction of its founding member Chin Detera.

== History ==
CHNDTR was formed in April 2016 after winning the Robinsons Supermarket presented Deli Music Festival Battle of the Bands. The group takes its name from lead vocalist Chin Detera, with all vowels removed as a stylistic choice inspired by early mobile phone texting conventions. According to the band, the spelling was intended to emphasize CHNDTR as a collective rather than frame it as a solo act.

CHNDTR released its debut studio album, Habang Umuulan (2018), through independent record label Tower of Doom. The record centers on themes of heartbreak and emotional vulnerability. Its lead single, "Kulang" (transl. No Enough), became the band's most streamed track, passing one million streams, while songs such as "Martyr", "Maw!", and "Babalik Pa Ba" (transl. Will [You] Come Back) also drew strong online attention.

After the album's release, CHNDTR performed in several live and radio sessions, including Wish 107.5, MYX, and Tower Sessions. The band also served as brand ambassadors for Pony.

In the years that followed, CHNDTR released a number of singles that showed the band exploring new musical ideas. Songs like "Sulat" (transl. Letter), "'Di Nga Pala Tayo" (transl. We're Not Actually Together), and "Mine" continued to tell personal and emotional stories. The music video for "Sulat", was directed by a four-person team, including Paul Bagsic, Ibrahim Manalo, Michael Bihla, and Joseph Cacanindin. The bilingual track "Mine" was inspired by Filipino music from the 1990s, which often mixed English and Tagalog in its lyrics.

CHNDTR collaborated with Filipino rapper Scye on his 2021 single "Paru-Paro" (transl. Butterfly), contributing vocals to the track.

On November 18, 2025, CHNDTR announced its transition from a full band into a solo project led by Chin Detera. The final release credited to CHNDTR as a band was the single "Dapitan" (2025).

== Artistry ==
CHNDTR's music has been described as incorporating elements of punk rock, pop-punk, alternative rock and unique pop rock, featuring guitars that drive the melody and lyrics that deal with personal and emotional themes. Before moving on to a solo project, the band gained recognition for songs shaped by heartfelt experiences, a style often called "hugot-core".

Chin Detera has cited artists such as Barbie Almalbis, No Doubt, and Avril Lavigne as influences. She has described her songwriting process as being partly inspired by her love for films.

== Members ==
=== Current members ===
- Chin Detera – lead vocals, rhythm guitar

=== Former members ===
- Niko Bacani – lead guitar, backing vocals
- Sean De Leon – bass guitar, backing vocals
- Benjo Criste – drums
- Zach Alcasid – drums
- Dani Pajarillo II – drums
- Kyle Ynion – drums
- Clyde Tibayan – bass guitar
- Kit de Gala – bass guitar
- Joko Reantaso – lead guitar
- Gabriel Luis – lead guitar
- Eldrich Tabangcura – lead guitar

== Discography ==
=== Studio albums ===
- Habang Umuulan (2018)

=== Selected singles ===
- "Kulang" (2018)
- "Martyr" (2018)
- "Maw!" (2018)
- "Sulat" (2019)
- "Mine" (2022)
- "'Di Nga Pala Tayo" (2022)
- "Dapitan" (2025)

=== Collaboration ===
- "Paru-Paro" with Scye (2021)
