= Bulong =

Bulong may refer to:

== Places ==
- Bulong, Western Australia
  - Bulong Nickel Mine, a mine located at Bulong, Western Australia
- Bilung (pinyin as Bulong), Biru County, Tibet, China; a township
- Bulong Town, Baicheng County, Xinjiang, China; a town; see Baicheng County

== Culture ==
- Blang people, also known as Bulong, an ethnic group in China
- Blang language, also known as Bulong

== Entertainment ==
- Bulong (film), a 2011 Philippine film

=== Music ===
- Bulong (2019 song), the theme song of the 2019 TV series Hanggang sa Dulo ng Buhay Ko
- Bulong (2018 song), a 2018 song by December Avenue; see December Avenue discography
- Bulong (2004 song), a 2004 song by Kitchie Nadal, off her self-titled album Kitchie Nadal (album)
- Bulong (1992 song), a 1992 song by Janno Gibbs
- Bulong (album), a 1992 album by Janno Gibbs

== Other uses ==
- a type of whispering medical prayer, see History of medicine in the Philippines

== See also ==
- Bolong (disambiguation)
