= Saksi Ang Langit =

2022 song by December Avenue

Single by December Avenue
- Language: Filipino
- English title: Heaven's a Witness
- Released: November 25, 2022
- Genre: Indie pop; alternative rock
- Length: 4:19
- Label: Tower of Doom
- Songwriters: Ronzel Bautista; Muriel Danao
- Producers: December Avenue; Tower of Doom

December Avenue singles chronology
"Isang Himala" (2021)	"Saksi Ang Langit" (2022)	"Ilang Beses Kita Mamahalin?" (2023)

Music video
- "Saksi Ang Langit" on YouTube

"Saksi Ang Langit" (lit. 'Heaven's a Witness') is a song by Filipino band December Avenue. It was released as a digital single on November 25, 2022, through Tower of Doom, and was written by Ronzel Bautista and Muriel Danao. Different from the bands' regular previous songs about difficult experiences, "Saksi Ang Langit" is an indie pop alternative rock track that speaks profoundly about love in its best forms.

The song resurged on the internet nearly three years later due to the viral wedding of Zeinab Harake and Bobby Ray Parks Jr. and later on to become a sleeper hit. It made a strong debut at number six on Billboard Philippines Hot 100 and number 3 on Top Philippine Songs on June 28, 2025, marking the band's highest debut for a song in the Billboard Philippines charts.

== Background and release ==
Following their successful tour in Canada and the United States, the band released their single, "Saksi Ang Langit" on November 25, 2022.

== Composition and lyrics ==
"Saksi Ang Langit"
A 21-second sample of "Saksi Ang Langit", where the chorus can be heard.

The song was composed by Ronzel Bautista and Muriel Danao, and produced by December Avenue and Tower of Doom. Different from the bands' regular previous songs about difficult experiences, "Saksi Ang Langit" is an indie pop alternative rock track that speaks profoundly about love in its best forms.

According to the band's keyboardist Gelo Cruz, said that the melody is light, slow, and feel-good, making listeners feel warm like a warm sunrise after a cold night. The keyboard tunes complement Jem Manuel's upbeat guitar riffs, creating a rush that gets your blood pumping. Don Gregorio's bass lines perfectly glue the rhythm and melody together, completing the song.

Jet wrote a song reflecting his love for his daughter and dreams, expressing his unconditional love for her, stating that, "parang kanta sa magiging kasal niya paglaki. Saksi ang langit sa unconditional love na iyon." December Avenue reiterates that the song can serve as a poignant ode to parent-child love, a romantic serenade for soulmates, or an expression of self-love.

== Reception ==
=== Commercial performance ===
Originally released in November 2022, the song gained popularity again in June 2025, reaching number three on the Billboard Top Philippine Songs and number six on the Philippines Hot 100. On July 3, the song rose to number two on the Top Philippine Songs chart and number three on the Philippines Hot 100. On July 16, the song peaked at number two on the Philippines Hot 100.

The band achieved significant success on two Spotify charts, reaching 2 on Viral 50 Philippines and Top 50 Philippines, 3 on Spotify Top Artists Philippines, and 31 on the Viral Top 50 Global chart.

== Accolades ==
Award	Year	Category	Result	Ref.
Wish Music Awards	2024	"Wish Rock/Alternative Song of the Year"	Nominated	
Awit Awards	2023	"Music Video of the Year"	Nominated	
Awit Awards	2023	"People's Voice Favorite Song"	Nominated	

== Charts ==
Chart performances for "Saksi Ang Langit"
Chart (2025)	Peak position
Philippines (IFPI)	2
Philippines Hot 100 (Billboard Philippines)	2
Philippines (Top Philippine Songs)	2

== Credits and personnel ==
Credits are adapted from Apple Music.

- December Avenue — performer, producer
- Zel Bautista — vocals, songwriter (Note: Zel is short for Ronzel)
- Don Gregorio — bass
- Gelo Cruz — keyboards
- Jem Manuel — lead guitar
- Muriel Danao — drums, songwriter (Note: Also known as Jet Danao)
- Tower of Doom — producer
