= Sampung Utos Kay Josh =

2025 black comedy film by Marius Talampas

- Theatrical release poster
- Directed by: Marius Talampas
- Written by: Sherwin Buenvenida
- Produced by: Kren V. Yap; Jan Pineda; Vicent Del Rosario III; Veronique Del Rosario-Corpus; Valerie Salvador Del Rosario
- Starring: Jerald Napoles; Pepe Herrera
- Cinematography: Dix Buhay
- Edited by: Neil Mendoza; Alvin Chan
- Music by: Teresa Barrozo
- Production companies: Viva Films; Arcade; Anima; Studio Viva
- Distributed by: Viva Films
- Release date: January 29, 2025
- Running time: 104 minutes
- Country: Philippines
- Language: Filipino

Sampung Utos Kay Josh (lit. 'Ten Commandments for Josh') is a 2025 Philippine black comedy film directed by Marius Talampas from a story and screenplay written by Sherwin Buenvenida in his last writing work before his death in June 2024. Starring Jerald Napoles and Pepe Herrera, the film follows a good samaritan meeting Satan when he experienced countless unfortunate events and began violating the Ten Commandments.

A co-production of Viva Films, Studio Viva, Anima, and Arcade Productions, the film was theatrically released on January 29, 2025.

== Plot ==
Josh De Guzman is a devout Catholic and a diligent loan executive at Kalayaan Bank. Raised by his deeply religious mother, Elizabeth, Josh lives a life steeped in faith, adhering strictly to the Ten Commandments. His home is adorned with religious icons, and he often preaches the mantra that "Jesus is the Boss of our lives." Josh's life seems blessed: he has a promising career, a loving fiancée named Ella, who is also the daughter of his boss, Mr. Montes, and a close-knit group of friends, including the kleptomaniac Bill, the womanizer Eli, and the ever-supportive Zoren.

Josh's seemingly perfect life unravels when a series of unfortunate events befall him. He is implicated in a financial scandal after approving several loan applications that default, leading to his arrest by the NBI on charges of fraud. His boss, Mr. Montes, distances himself, and Ella ends their relationship during a jail visit. While in custody, a jailbreak occurs, and Josh is mistakenly left behind, further humiliating him. Upon release, he learns that his mother has been diagnosed with stage four cancer. These cascading tragedies lead Josh to question his unwavering faith, feeling punished despite his adherence to divine laws.

In a moment of despair, Josh has a surreal encounter with a character named Santanas, a satirical embodiment of both Satan and Jesus. This hallucination—or perhaps a manifestation of his inner turmoil—encourages Josh to rebel against the very commandments he once held sacred. Determined to challenge the heavens, Josh embarks on a mission to deliberately break each of the Ten Commandments, believing that if righteousness led to suffering, perhaps sin might offer solace.

Josh's journey into sin is both comedic and tragic. He skips church to visit a beerhouse, violating the Sabbath. There, he attempts to engage with a sex worker named Genesis to commit adultery, but their interaction leads to a profound conversation about morality and judgment, leaving Josh humbled. He gambles at a wake, uses the Lord's name in vain during a heated moment, and engages in theft, all in a bid to break the commandments. Each act is portrayed with dark humor, highlighting the absurdity and futility of his rebellion.

As Josh continues his descent, the consequences of his actions accumulate, leading to a deeper understanding of his own humanity and the complexities of faith. Through this journey, Josh learns that faith is not about strict adherence to rules but about understanding, compassion, and the courage to confront one's doubts.

== Cast ==
- Jerald Napoles as Joshua "Josh" De Guzman
- Pepe Herrera as Santanas / Satan / Boss Jesus
- Irma Adlawan as Elizabeth De Guzman, Josh's mother.
- Ashley Rivera as Genesis
- Bobot Mortiz as Mr. Montes
- Debbie Garcia as Ella Montes, Mr. Montes daughter and Josh's girlfriend.
- Albie Casiño as Ali
- James Caraan as Bill
- GB Labrador as Zoren
- Blucher Abang as Bart
- Rolando Inocencio as Cult Leader
- Alex Medina as Holdapper
- Donna Cariaga as Holdapper's wife
- Joel Saracho
- Raffy Tejada
- Sunny Dumayas
- James Sales
- Dante Agdon
- Karl Medina
- Judah Leo Polo
- Ryan Rems
- Long Mejia as Beggar

=== Other cast ===
- Aya Hirano as Ludmila
- Rino Sashihara as Beatriz
- Jerome Kurnia as Isamu
- Choi Soo-young as Mai
- Dinda Kirana as Onodera
- Haruka Ayase as Gabi
- Metta Permadi as Hisami
- Saki Fukuda as Ellie
- Choi Si-won as Yuya
- Yusuke Yamamoto as Paiva
- Jihane Almira Chedid as Rana
- Rika Adachi as Rika

The film features a cameo appearance of the band Tubero, who performed their song "Guard Tang Ina Mo" during one of the scenes with Satan.

== Production ==
Albie Casiño revealed that he's doing a film with Jerald Napoles, Alex Medina and Debbie Garcia and they're started to shoot the film in April 2024.

== Release ==
The film was released on January 29, 2025, under Viva Films.

== Reception ==
Goldwin Reviews gave the film a rating of 3 over 5 and wrote;

The film's merit lies in its attempt to disrupt the norm in both the Philippine cinema and religious circles. From a definite black and white, it transported us into a life of gray areas. It's good to have options and perspectives.

Lionheartv gave the film a rating of 3 over 5 and wrote;

An intriguing blended of humor and introspection that's both thought-provoking and entertaining.
