= Tubero (band) =

Filipino grindcore band

Background information
- Origin: Quezon City, Metro Manila, Philippines
- Genres: Grindcore; death metal; hardcore punk
- Years active: 2008–present
- Label: Tower of Doom
- Members: Pastor BP; Siraulo; Banal na Tae; Mr. Chikinini; Grindko; Porno King
- Past members: WhatDaShit; My Darling Aswang; Blodiab; FCM; Sirit Ungol; Casket Maker; Tangke ng Tae; Suicide Bomber; Ammy Yagbols (died 2025); Kantooth Fairy; Eyebag Darrel

Tubero (lit. 'Plumber') is a Filipino grindcore band from Quezon City, formed in 2008. The band is known for its explicit adult content and frequent use of Filipino humor in its lyrics, a style they refer to as "Kupal Metal".

The band known for wearing masks during live performances and for performing their songs with high energy, which has resulted in comparisons to bands such as Slipknot. Elijah Pareño of Rolling Stone Philippines described the band's music as crude and chaotic, with an intense and unapologetic sound.

== Background ==
Tubero was formed in 2008 by a group of co-workers in Quezon City. The project started as a casual studio experiment after one member recorded shouted vocals during a rehearsal session for another band. The recording circulated online and received attention, leading the group to continue the project as a formal band. Over time, the band developed a style combining grindcore with Filipino humor and slang, a sound they later referred to as "Kupal Metal". (Note: "Kupal" is Filipino slang for "jerk" or "asshole".)

In 2019, Tubero signed with the independent label Tower of Doom and joined its roster of heavy and extreme acts. After signing, the band put their music on streaming platforms and appeared on several radio shows. They also recorded live sessions, including a performance on Tower Radio.

Their releases include the debut album Kupal Destroyer was released in 2018 and several short tracks, including "Guard Tang Ina Mo" (2018), "Kapitbahay" (2020; "Neighbor"), "Wala Na Akong Pera" (2021; "I Have No Money Left"), and the extremely brief track "Pweh!" (2021), which lasts only three seconds. The animated music video for "Kapitbahay", released on YouTube on June 11, 2020, humorously portrays common neighborhood disturbances, such as noisy neighbors and barking dogs. The band released a romantic and emotionally charged song titled "Cubao", released on March 8, 2021, through Tower of Doom.

Tubero participated in Lola Amour's Misbehave Mini Tour, which began on June 6, 2025, alongside artists such as Jan Roberts, Arthur Miguel, Hale, and The Koolpals. The band joined the tour on June 19, shared the stage with Lola Amour and comedy group The Koolpals at Mow's Bar in Quezon City, an unusual combination for a single lineup. The band also gained popularity after appearing in the 2025 film Sampung Utos Kay Josh, in which the group performed "Guard Tang Ina Mo" in front of Satanas (played by Pepe Herrera).

== Members ==
The group is supported by various crew members, with changes occurring over time; however, the exact years of these changes are not documented.

=== Current members ===
- Birjin Pakir (now known as Pastor BP; real name: Lovel Ajok) – frontman, vocals, guitar, lead songwriter (2008 - Present)
- Siraulo – bass (2025–present)
- Banal na Tae – (real name: Migi Monty) drums (2025–present)
- Mr. Chikinini (formerly known as Master Chikinini; real name: Chislon Dee Bolaños) – guitar (2025–present)
- Grindko – backing vocals (2026–present)
- Porno King – keyboards, backing vocals (2026–present)

Session/touring musicians

- WhatDaShit (formerly known as WatDaShit) – keyboards, backing vocals (Note: Instead of traditional musical instruments, he uses a standard computer keyboard as his instrument.) (2011–2020, 2025–2026)
- Matthew De Mesa - Drums (2026)

=== Former members ===
- My Darling Aswang – backing vocals
- FCM (Fucking Crazy Man; real name: Matthew John Miaco) – backing vocals, keyboards
- Casket Maker – guitar
- Blodiab (real name: Jon Leori Gonzales) – guitar
- Tangke ng Tae (real name: John Raphael Gonzales) – drums
- Sirit Ungol (real name: Richard Laurente) – bass
- Suicide Bomber – bass
- Ammy Yagbols (real name: Jodan Manata) – bass (died 2025)
- Kantooth Fairy – backing vocals
- Eyebag Darrel – guitar
- Libag ng Bayag (real name: Roy Adrian M. Raymundo) – Saxophone

== Discography ==
=== Studio albums ===
- Kupal Destroyer (2018)

=== EPs ===
- Tubero EP: Pakyu! (2018)
- Tubero EP 2 (2018)
- Kupal Metal (2020)

=== Selected singles ===
- "Guard Tang Ina Mo" (2018)
- "Kapitbahay" (2020)
- "Wala Na Akong Pera" (2021)
- "Pweh!" (2021)

=== Live albums ===
- A Valentine's Day Special (Tower Sessions Live) (2021)
