= Bolong (disambiguation) =

Bolong may refer to:

- Bolong yixianensis, a genus of iguanodontian dinosaur
- Bolong, New South Wales, Australia; a locality
- Bolong River, New South Wales, Australia; a river
- Bolong, Zamboanga, Philippines; a former town that was merged into Zamboanga City

== See also ==
- Bulong (disambiguation)
