= Tower of Doom (record label) =

Philippine independent record label

- Parent company: Independent
- Founded: 2002; 24 years ago
- Founder: Eric Perlas; Carlo Perlas
- Status: Active
- Genre: Rock, metal, alternative
- Country of origin: Philippines
- Location: Quezon City, Metro Manila, Philippines
- Official website: towerofdoom.net

Tower of Doom is an independent record label and recording studio based in Quezon City, Philippines. It was founded in 2002 by musician brothers Eric and Carlo Perlas. Over the years, the record label has become an important part of the Filipino music scene, especially in rock, metal, and alternative genres. Tower of Doom has helped many local artists grow, providing professional recording services and giving both established and new musicians a platform to share their music.

Eric and Carlo Perlas told Billboard Philippines that Tower of Doom started as a small home studio and described how their label operates differently from traditional companies. They emphasized the studio's focus on helping artists grow and supporting the Filipino rock music. Tower of Doom's work in audio and video production has earned widespread recognition, including more than 23 nominations and wins at the Awit Awards, the country’s first Cannes Lion Grand Prix, and several other awards in both local and international advertising.

== History ==
Tower of Doom started in the summer of 2002 as a small home-based digital studio in a college apartment, where Eric Perlas helped friends and fellow musicians record their original songs. In 2005, the label moved to a proper recording facility in Teachers Village, Quezon City, and over time grew into a multi-studio setup. Tower of Doom runs two large studios in New Manila, Quezon City, providing a full range of services, including audio recording, mixing, mastering, as well as video production for music videos, lyric videos, and live-streamed shows known as Tower Sessions.

In 2022, Tower of Doom signed a distribution deal with Ingrooves Music Group, allowing the label to share its music with listeners around the world. The first release under this deal was the December Avenue's single "Saksi Ang Langit". Eric and Carlo, said the collaboration would help the label grow both in the Philippines and internationally. Ingrooves, a global leader in music distribution and marketing, provides independent labels with the tools to expand their reach.

Tower of Doom is well known for supporting local rock artists such as Greyhoundz, Valley of Chrome, Gabby Alipe (from Urbandub), and Tanya Markova, and for producing its popular live performance series, Tower Sessions. Guji Lorenzana, Ingrooves' Country Manager for the Philippines, described the record label as "one of the most exciting independent record labels in the country", noting that December Avenue's single was a strong way to launch their partnership.

== Notable artists ==
- December Avenue
- Tanya Markova
- CHNDTR
- Carissa
- Valley of Chrome
- Gabby Alipe
- Ebe Dancel
- Wilabaliw
- Arcadia
- Greyhoundz
- The Itchyworms
- Kamikazee
- Franco
- Parokya Ni Edgar
- Tubero
- Sponge Cola
- Typecast
- Chicosci
- LostThreads
- Stickfiggas
- Queso
- Orca

== See also ==
- Tarsier Records
- O/C Records
