= Hugot (slang) =

Filipino slang word

Hugot (often referred to as hugot lines) is a Filipino slang word or quotation often used for short lines or remarks that come from personal feelings. These are usually about love, relationships, or situations people go through in daily life. The word comes from the Tagalog verb hugot, which means "to pull out" and in common use it points to feelings that are taken from personal experience and put into words, especially in casual talk or online posts.

== Definition ==
In contemporary use, people use hugot for short lines that come from personal feelings. These lines often talk about love, heartbreak, or daily life, and people often respond by saying the phrase "Hugot!" or "#Hugot" when they relate to the line or feel the emotion behind it.

== Origins and usage ==
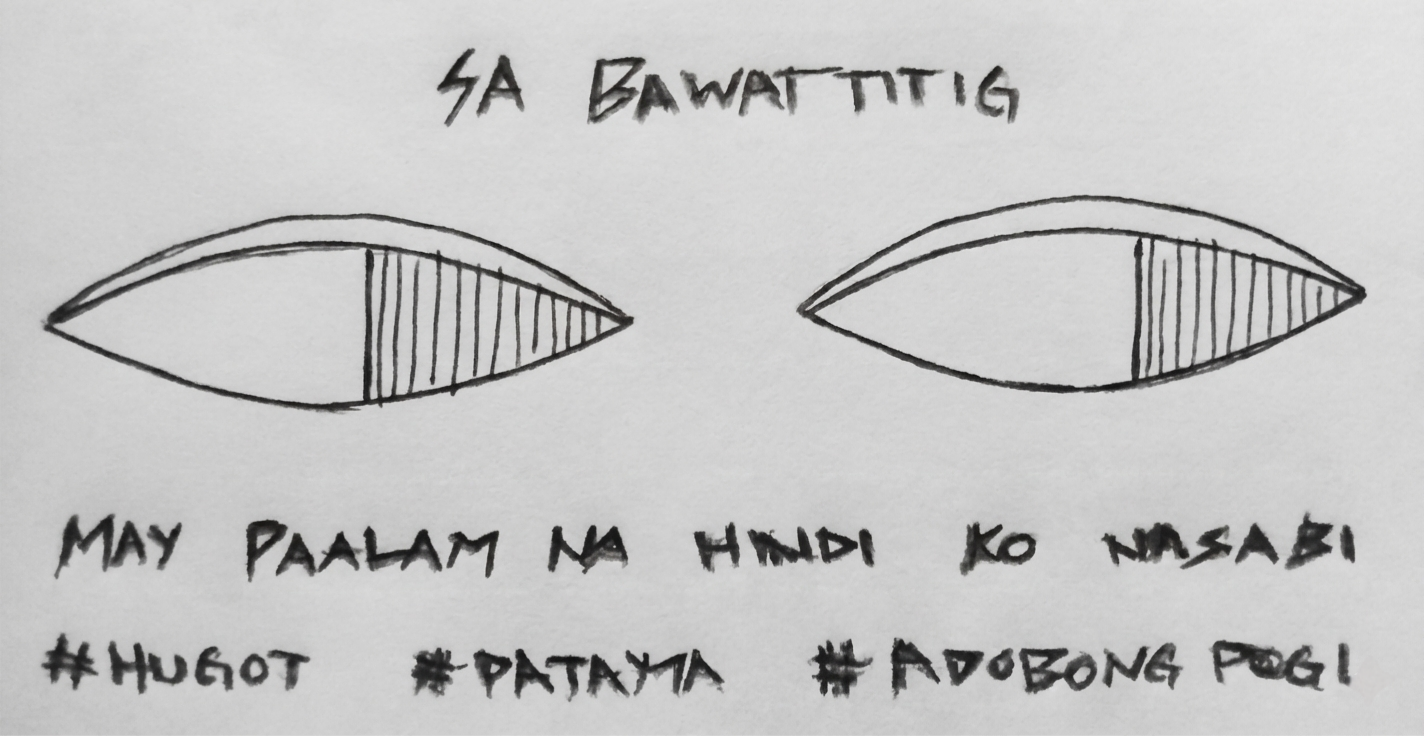
Example of a Hugot line illustration showing eyes with the handwritten phrase "Sa bawat titig, may paalam na hindi ko nasabi" ("In every gaze, there is a goodbye I never said") and hashtag that are commonly used online.

Hugot became widely used in the mid-2010s, around the same time social media grew in the Philippines. Sites like Facebook, Twitter (now known as X), and Instagram gave people a place to share short, emotional posts that others could easily relate to and spread.

The term also became closely associated with Philippine popular culture, particularly romantic films known for emotionally heavy dialogue. Director Antoinette Jadaone's film That Thing Called Tadhana (2014) is frequently cited as contributing to the mainstream visibility of hugot expressions in cinema.

Hugot lines are commonly shared as text posts, memes, captions, and jokes on social media. People are drawn to them because of their simplicity and how easily they can relate to their own experiences. Hugot expressions have also appeared in films, television programs, merchandise, and advertising, showing how they have become part of culture in the Philippines.

== Criticism ==
Cultural commentators describe hugot as part of a broader Filipino tradition of wordplay and emotional expression, similar to banat and other forms of verbal humor. The Guidon has said that hugot comes from youth culture in the 2000s, when music and poetry often showed personal struggles.

The Philippine Star wrote that hugot can help people deal with emotions. Some hugot lines include extra details or are made mostly to get attention, which can make them less effective. There are also studies that suggest reading too many sentimental posts online might make people less reflective, though experts do not fully agree.

== See also ==
- Marites
- Walang Forever
