= The Infatuation Is Always There =

Studio album by Typecast
- Released: August 2004
- Genre: Emo; post-hardcore; pop-punk
- Length: 52:23
- Label: EMI
- Producer: Raimund Marasigan; Diego Castillo

Typecast chronology
Last Time (2002)	The Infatuation Is Always There (2004)	Every Moss and Cobweb (2006)

The Infatuation Is Always There is the second album by Filipino band Typecast, but their first release on a major record label. It was released in August 2004 under EMI Records Philippines on audio compact disc and produced by Raimund Marasigan and Diego Castillo. A vinyl record version of this album will be available for the first time to commemorate the album's 20th anniversary. It will be released under Eikon Records. 2 versions of the vinyl record will be available by January 2025. 250 copies of 2-colored vinyl will be available on Eikon Records' Facebook page, and 100 copies of Opaque Purple will be available exclusively from the Ted Ellis Record store.

== Track listing ==
1. Another Minute Until Ten
2. Breathe Through the Glass
3. Escape the Hurt
4. Assertion
5. Clutching
6. The Infatuation Is Always There
7. Out Comes the Brave
8. Last Time
9. 21 and Counting
10. Wait
11. Scars of a Failing Heart
12. Guilt Kill

== Credits ==
- Lyrics: Steve Badiola and Melvin Macatiag for "Assertion" and "Scars of a Failing Heart"
- Studio recording: Sound Creation and Squid Crib Studios
- Record and mix: Raimund Marasigan
- Distribution: EMI Records Philippines
