= December Avenue (December Avenue album) =

Studio album by December Avenue
- Released: February 15, 2016
- Studio: Tower of Doom Records (Quezon City, Metro Manila)
- Genre: Indie pop; emo; pop punk; pop rock; alternative rock; acoustic rock
- Length: 45:17
- Label: Tower of Doom
- Producer: Eric Perlas

December Avenue chronology
Sleep Tonight EP (2011)	December Avenue (2016)	Langit Mong Bughaw (2019)

Singles from December Avenue
- 1. "Time To Go" Released: 2010; 2. "Sleep Tonight" Released: 2011; 3. "I’ll Be Watching You" Released: 2011; 4. "City Lights" Released: 2011; 5. "Eroplanong Papel" Released: 2016

December Avenue is the debut studio album by Filipino band December Avenue. It was released on February 15, 2016, by Tower of Doom Records.

== Background ==
After independently releasing two EPs, December Avenue released their first studio album in February 2016. Released under Tower of Doom Music, the album contains 11 tracks that took 5 years to make. When asked why it took years for December Avenue to release an official debut album, vocalist Zel Bautista explained that aside from their conflicting schedules, building hype was crucial in the process of creating one. The same question was asked during December Avenue's Rappler Live Jam performance, with Bautista saying that it did not feel right to release an album without much of a following. Members added that they felt that December Avenue have fulfilled their musical destiny upon the album's release, and that they are “overwhelmed.”

== Singles ==
December Avenue released their first single, “Time To Go” in 2010, and it started their slow rise to the mainstream indie circuit. Regularly playing gigs, December Avenue has gained a steady fan base since then.

The second single ("Sleep Tonight"), the third single ("I'll Be Watching You"), and the fourth single ("City Lights") from the album were released on 2011 via EP called Sleep Tonight.

== Track listing ==
December Avenue
No.	Title	Writer(s)	Length
1.	"City Lights"		4:22
2.	"Sleep Tonight"		4:49
3.	"Fallin'" (featuring Clara Benin)		4:10
4.	"Ears and Rhymes"		3:16
5.	"I'll Be Watching You"	Bautista	4:31
6.	"Back to Love"		4:34
7.	"Eroplanong Papel"	Bautista	5:03
8.	"Dive"		2:55
9.	"Forever"		3:34
10.	"Breathe Again"		3:42
11.	"Time To Go"		4:21
Total length:			45:17

== Personnel ==
=== December Avenue ===
- Zel Bautista - vocals, acoustic guitar
- Jem Manuel - lead guitar
- Don Gregorio - bass guitar
- Jet Danao - drums, percussion, backing vocals
- Gelo Cruz - keyboards, backing vocals
