= Langit Mong Bughaw =

Studio album by December Avenue
- Released: December 20, 2019
- Recorded: 2017–2019
- Studios: Tower of Doom Records (Quezon City, Metro Manila)
- Genres: Indie pop; emo; pop punk; pop rock; alternative rock; acoustic rock
- Length: 53:41
- Label: Tower of Doom
- Producer: Eric Perlas

December Avenue chronology
December Avenue (2016)	Langit Mong Bughaw (2019)

Singles from December Avenue
- 1. "Sa Ngalan Ng Pag-Ibig" Released: April 29, 2017; 2. "Kahit 'Di Mo Alam" Released: September 17, 2017; 3. "Bulong" Released: April 8, 2018; 4. "Kung 'Di Rin Lang Ikaw" Released: July 22, 2018; 5. "Magkunwari ('Di Man Tayo)" Released: February 7, 2019; 6. "Dahan" Released: February 14, 2019; 7. "Huling Sandali" Released: April 7, 2019; 8. "Sa Paghimig Mo" Released: December 21, 2019; 9. "Muling Magbabalik" Released: December 21, 2019

Langit Mong Bughaw (lit. 'Your Blue Sky') is the second studio album by Filipino band December Avenue. It was released on December 20, 2019, by Tower of Doom Records. It is currently the most streamed Filipino album of all time on Spotify.

== Background ==
Three years after releasing their self-titled debut album, December Avenue released their sophomore album on 20 December 2019. Released under Tower of Doom Music, the album contains 11 tracks.

== Singles ==
December Avenue released their first single "Sa Ngalan Ng Pag-Ibig" in April 2017.

"Kahit 'Di Mo Alam", the second single of the album was released in September 2017.

The third single of the album "Bulong" was released in April 2018. According to Koi Busalla, the band manager/ co-producer, the music video of the song tackles about mental health awareness, he explained in an interview, "They basically based it on the song’s message itself. From that idea, we picked our brains out and enhanced every possible scene that would make it more dramatic at the same time realistic. We want to show people that we should love someone unconditionally. These lines speaks deeper than words. “Ako’y alipin ng pag-ibig mo / Handang ibigin ang ‘sang tulad mo.” You can love someone but not anyone can love someone at his/her worst."

The fourth single of the album "Kung 'Di Rin Lang Ikaw" was released in July 2018, in collaboration with Filipina singer Moira Dela Torre. According to Zel Bautista, the lead singer of the band, the song is about moving on, he said in an interview, "I always put myself in other people’s shoes to feel what they do in a situation to become relatable with listeners." The song was used as one of the official soundtracks of Hello, Love, Goodbye.

The fifth single, "Magkunwari ('Di Man Tayo)" was released in February 2019. The song was used as the official sound track of Filipino tv-series TODA One I Love.

The sixth single "Dahan" was released in February 2019, one week after releasing their fifth single. Although the song became popular in 2014 as Filipino singer Jireh Lim released a video of him singing the song, many fans were confused of who the original singer was, Lim then explained on his tweet, "Nag cover lang po ako ng song na Dahan. How many times do I have to remind you?! December Avenue po ang original non.".

The seventh single of the album, "Huling Sandali" was released in April 2019 and was used as one of the official soundtracks of the movie, Tayo Sa Huling Buwan Ng Taon.

The eighth single "Sa Paghimig Mo" and the ninth single "Muling Magbabalik" was released in December 2019.

== Track listing ==
Langit Mong Bughaw
No.	Title	Length
1.	"Intro"	1:26
2.	"Bulong"	4:25
3.	"Kung 'di Rin Lang Ikaw" (featuring Moira Dela Torre)	4:24
4.	"Magkunwari ('di Man Tayo)"	4:36
5.	"Muling Magbabalik"	4:48
6.	"Sa Ngalan Ng Pag-Ibig"	4:33
7.	"Sa Paghimig Mo"	3:51
8.	"Dahan"	4:55
9.	"Kahit 'di Mo Alam"	4:42
10.	"Kahit Sa Panaginip"	4:39
11.	"Huling Sandali"	5:40
12.	"Sa Dulo Ng Walang Hanggan" (Sa Ngalan Ng Pag-Ibig Piano Version)	5:42
Total length:		53:41

== Personnel ==
=== December Avenue ===
- Zel Bautista - vocals, acoustic guitar
- Jem Manuel - lead guitar
- Don Gregorio - bass guitar
- Jet Danao - drums, percussion, backing vocals
- Gelo Cruz - keyboards, backing vocals
