= December Avenue (band) =

Filipino rock band formed in 2007

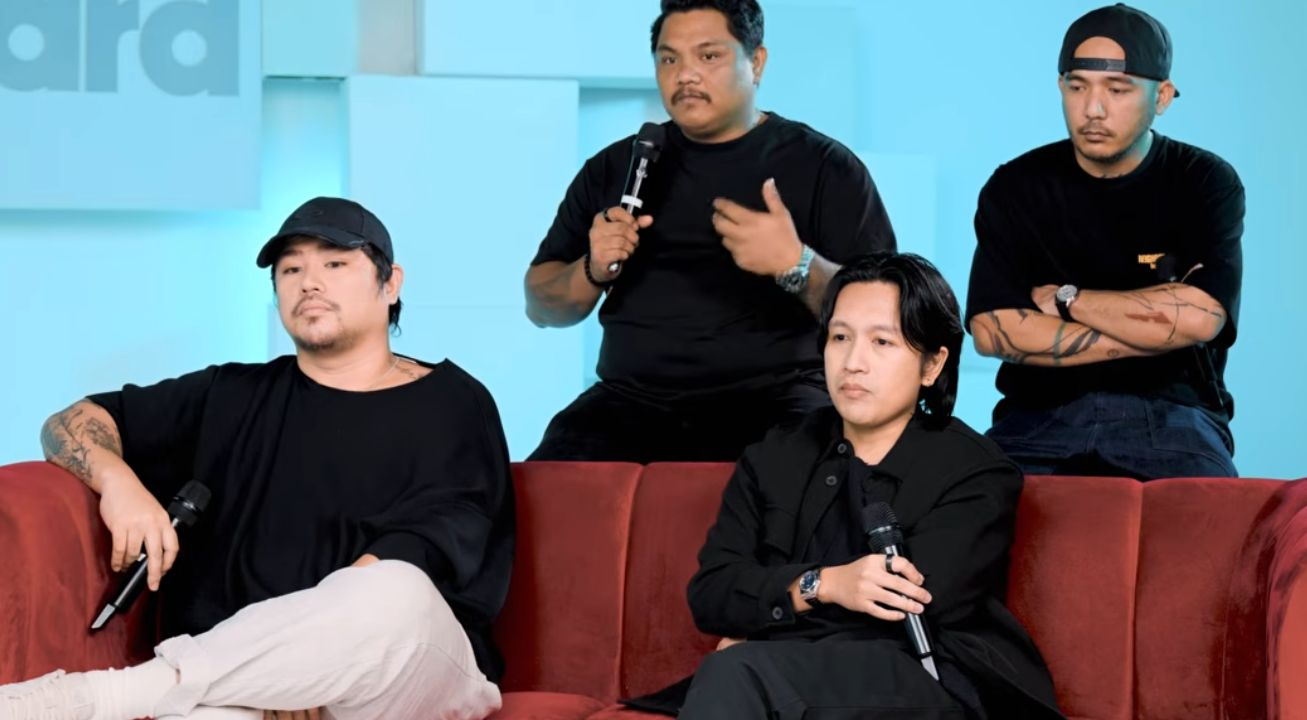
- From left to right: Zel Bautista, Jet Danao, Gelo Cruz, and Jem Manuel

Background information
- Also known as: Sense of Sound (formerly)
- Origin: Metro Manila, Philippines
- Genres: Pop rock; indie rock; alternative rock; emo pop
- Years active: 2007–present
- Label: Tower of Doom
- Members: Zel Bautista; Jem Manuel; Jet Danao; Gelo Cruz
- Past members: Don Gregorio
- Website: www.decemberave.com

December Avenue is a Filipino rock band from Manila, known for their viral compositions online. The band is one of the most streamed OPM bands of all-time. The band is composed of Zel Bautista on vocals and guitars, Jem Manuel on guitars, Jet Danao on drums and backing vocals, and Gelo Cruz on keyboards and backing vocals.

Bautista, Manuel, and Danao started out in their alma mater University of Santo Tomas in 2007. Cruz, an alumnus of De La Salle-College of St. Benilde, was later added in 2016. Bautista is the chief composer of the band. Originally known for their predominantly English songs, the band has released Tagalog songs since 2016.

== Career ==
=== 2007–2015: Formation ===
December Avenue began as a college band in their alma mater University of Santo Tomas in 2007. All students of UST's Conservatory of Music, it featured Zel Bautista on vocals and guitar, Jem Manuel on lead guitar, Don Gregorio on bass and Jet Danao on drums. Their name, December Avenue, is based on the music they want to make, helping people move on in life with December "being the last month" and an avenue "toward a new year". In 2009, they performed at the "Pilipino:Kaya Natin Ito" concert that raised funds for Gawad Kalinga.

Their first song "Time to Go" was released. That single helped them break into the mainstream and they started getting more gigs, mostly in the underground scene. However, in their early years, they earned little from their gigs, and often had to fund themselves.

=== 2016–2018: Breakthrough and December Avenue ===
In February 2016, December Avenue released their first full-length, self-titled album. One of the songs from that album, "Eroplanong Papel", became one of their most famous singles. They also added Gelo Cruz on keyboards that year and released "Sa Ngalan ng Pag-Ibig", which boosted their fanbase and became one of their most defining singles. During this time, they started writing more songs in Tagalog. They ended the year with their first headlining concert in Greenhills that featured guests such as Clara Benin, as well as Gabby Alipe and John Dinopol of Urbandub. The concert sold out in a few days.

In 2018, December Avenue collaborated with Gracenote and Autotelic for the single "Summer Song". The song was used for 7-Eleven's summer campaign. They then released several singles including "Bulong", a song on mental health, and "Kung Di Rin Lang Ikaw", their collaboration with Moira dela Torre. "Kung Di Rin Lang Ikaw" and their song "Sa Ngalan ng Pag-ibig" were featured in the film Hello Love, Goodbye.

=== 2019–present: Langit Mong Bughaw ===
In 2019, December Avenue recorded the song "Magkunwari ('Di Man Tayo)" for the GMA series TODA One I Love. They also featured on the soundtrack for the indie film Tayo Sa Huling Buwan ng Taon with "Huling Sandali". For 2019, they were named as the most streamed artist on Spotify for the Philippines. They are the first Filipino act to top Spotify Wrapped, with "Kung Di Rin Lang Ikaw" claiming the top spot as the Most Streamed Track for 2019. At the end of the year, they released their second album Langit Mong Bughaw on December 20.

After the release of their album, December Avenue performed with Boyce Avenue and I Belong to the Zoo during Boyce Avenue's concert on February 14, 2020. On April 5, December Avenue launched the single "Bakas Ng Talampakan", which was a tribute to Bautista's dog. They were then featured on Rico Blanco's tribute album "Rico Blanco Songbook" with a cover of "Umaaraw, Umuulan".

On May 19, 2021, the band released their single "Drive", which featured R&B sounds. It was followed by the release of "Isang Himala" on August 7. They then performed at the Expo 2020 Dubai, then went on a US tour alongside Zack Tabudlo. After their tour, they released a new single "Saksi Ang Langit", which differed from their previous work due to its more uplifting sound.

In February 2023, it was announced that their album Langit Mong Bughaw had become the most streamed Filipino album of all-time on Spotify, with over 720 million streams. Soon after, December Avenue released a single "Ilang Beses Kitang Mamahalin". They also went on tour in several major cities of Australia and New Zealand. On June 30, they released their collaboration with Belle Mariano "Wala Nang Iba". To close out the year, they released the song "In My Arms Is Where I’ll Keep You", a tribute to Bautista's partner.

For 2024, December Avenue was supposed to hold their 15th anniversary concert initially scheduled for February 11. That was postponed to August 30 at the Mall of Asia Arena. In between dates, they released "Face of God". Another international tour was announced before their anniversary concert. The concert, entitled "Sa Ilalim Ng Mga Bituin : December Avenue Concert", sold out and featured Barbie Almalbis as a special guest.

== Artistry ==
Logo until 2020

Logo since 2020

Their music has been described as pop rock, indie rock and alternative rock. Baby A. Gil of The Philippine Star described their sound as "pop rock of the light kind that echoes early Manila Sound" with sweet and simple lyrics. Their music has also been influenced by pop. Lead vocalist Zel Bautista has been influenced by the R&B genre. Vocalist Zel Bautista infrequently employs screaming vocals signifying pain and grief.

According to the band, their songs are meant to help people move on in life. Their lyrics are based on real-life experiences; honest and sentimental, yet optimistic. Although they're known for songs about "life and loss", they also want to cover more inspirational and hopeful themes in their future projects.

== Members ==
Current members

- Zel Bautista – vocals, acoustic guitar (2007–present)
- Jem Manuel – lead guitar (2007–present)
- Jet Danao – drums, percussion, backing vocals (2007–present)
- Gelo Cruz – keyboards, backing vocals (2016–present)

Touring substitutes

- Carissa Ramos – bass guitar (2025–present)
- Jaco Sosmeña – drums, percussion
- Eo Marcos – drums, percussion
- Miko Matsumoto – lead guitar

Past members

- Don Gregorio – bass guitar (2007–2025), backing vocals (2007–2016)

== Discography ==
Studio albums

- December Avenue (2016)
- Langit Mong Bughaw (2019)

EPs

- Time To Go (2010)
- Sleep Tonight (2011)

== Tours ==
- December Avenue Concert (2019)
- Dec Ave (2023)
- Sa Ilalim Ng Mga Bituin: December Avenue’s 15th Anniversary Concert (2024)
- Sa Ilalim Ng Mga Bituin: The Repeat (2024)
- For The Ones We Love (2026)
- Polaris - Beneath The Same Sky Tour (2026)

== Awards and nominations ==
Award ceremony	Year	Category	Nominee(s)/work(s)	Result	Ref.
EdukCircle Awards	2019	Most Influential OPM Band of the Year	"December Avenue"	Won	
MOR Pinoy Music Awards	2019	Best Collaboration	"Kung Di Rin Lang Ikaw" with Moira Dela Torre	Won	
MOR Pinoy Music Awards	2019	Band of the Year	"Kung Di Rin Lang Ikaw" with Moira Dela Torre	Nominated	
MOR Pinoy Music Awards	2019	Song of the Year	"Kung Di Rin Lang Ikaw" with Moira Dela Torre	Nominated	
MOR Pinoy Music Awards	2019	Digital Artist of the Year	"Bulong"	Nominated	
MYX Music Awards	2019	Group of the Year	"December Avenue"	Nominated	
MYX Music Awards	2019	Collaboration of the Year	"Kung Di Rin Lang Ikaw" with Moira Dela Torre	Won	
PMPC Star Awards for Music	2019	Collaboration of the Year	"Kung Di Rin Lang Ikaw" with Moira Dela Torre	Won	
PMPC Star Awards for Music	2019	Song of the Year	"Kung Di Rin Lang Ikaw" with Moira Dela Torre	Nominated	
Wish Music Awards	2019	Wishclusive Collaboration of the Year	"Kung Di Rin Lang Ikaw" with Moira Dela Torre	Nominated	
Wish Music Awards	2019	Wishclusive Rock Performance of the Year	"Kahit Di Mo Alam"	Nominated	
Wish Music Awards	2019	Wish Group of the Year	"December Avenue"	Nominated	
Awit Awards	2020	Best Song Written for Movie/TV	"Huling Sandali"	Won	
Awit Awards	2020	Best Ballad Recording	"Kung Di Rin Lang Ikaw" with (Moira Dela Torre)	Nominated	
Awit Awards	2020	Best Collaboration	"Kung Di Rin Lang Ikaw" with (Moira Dela Torre)	Nominated	
Awit Awards	2020	Best Pop Recording	"Kung Di Rin Lang Ikaw" with (Moira Dela Torre)	Nominated	
Awit Awards	2020	Song of the Year	"Kung Di Rin Lang Ikaw" with (Moira Dela Torre)	Nominated	
Wish Music Awards	2020	Bronze Wishclusive Elite Circle	"Kahit Di Mo Alam"	Won	
Wish Music Awards	2020	Bronze Wishclusive Elite Circle	"Kung Di Rin Lang Ikaw" with (Moira Dela Torre)	Won	
Wish Music Awards	2020	Silver Wishclusive Elite Circle	"Kung Di Rin Lang Ikaw" with (Moira Dela Torre)	Won	
Wish Music Awards	2020	Silver Wishclusive Elite Circle	"Sa Ngalan Ng Pag-Ibig"	Won	
Wish Music Awards	2020	Wish Group of the Year	"December Avenue"	Nominated	
Wish Music Awards	2020	Wish Rock/Alternative Song of the Year	"Huling Sandali"	Nominated	
Wish Music Awards	2024	Wish Rock/Alternative Song of the Year	"Saksi Ang Langit"	Nominated	
