= Typecast (band) =

Filipino rock band

- Origin: Santa Rosa City, Laguna, Philippines
- Genres: Emo; alternative rock; pop-punk; post-hardcore
- Years active: 1999–present
- Labels: Independent- Distribution by: EMI Philippines; Warner Music; Tower of Doom
- Members: Steve Badiola; Chi Ressureccion; Pakoy Fletchero; Sep Roño
- Past members: Melvin Macatiag; Ryan Ronquillo

Typecast is a Filipino rock band from Santa Rosa City, Laguna. Originally an underground act, they surfaced on the mainstream Philippine music scene, while managing to hold on to their underground roots.

== Career ==
Laguna has been home to hardcore punk bands since the early 1990s. Brought up in a DIY community, the band came together in 1999, initially doing cover versions, after that they started doing their own songs. In 2004, they released their debut studio album, The Infatuation Is Always There, which paved their way to become one of the most influential rock bands in Southeast Asia.

With the release of their second studio album, "Every Moss and Cobweb", in 2007, the band changed their sound from gritty to melancholic lyrics that turned out to be emo.

The band broke into the local mainstream with the single "Will You Ever Learn", which won Best Song of the Year at the 2007 NU Rock Awards. This success eventually led to the opportunity to open for other popular bands such as Thursday, Darkest Hour, Good Charlotte, Saosin, Anberlin, All Time Low, Dashboard Confessional, The Used, and Cobra Starship.

In March 2013, Steve Badiola recorded a tribute to Karl Roy with Ian Rondilla entitled "Missed". The track was recorded at Tower of Doom Studios.

In 2014, drummer Melvin Macatiag was removed from the band and was replaced by Sep Roño in 2015.

Typecast released their first Tagalog song, "Mulat Na Mata", in 2019.

== Critical reception ==
Typecast pioneered the social networking website as a venue for independent music in Southeast Asia and holds the most number of friends and fans in the area. They were named as one of the most influential rock bands in Southeast Asia according to Magmug.com, an online magazine based in Singapore and Malaysia.

== Musical styles ==
The band's sound emphasizes on alternative rock, pop punk, post-hardcore and emo, which marked them in the country's rock music scene. Having often been mistaken for an American band, even Geoff Rickly of the band Thursday said that the band reminds him of the post-rock band Explosions in the Sky. Badiola's voice has also been compared to Chris Carrabba's.

== Discography ==
Studio albums

- Last Time (2002)
- The Infatuation Is Always There (2004)
- Every Moss and Cobweb (2006)
- How Your Influence Betrays You (2011)
- Eulogy (2026)

EPs

- Word Sits Heavy (2014)
- Gush (2026)
- Lionheart (2026)

== Members ==
Current members

- Steve Frank Badiola – lead vocals, guitars (1999–present)
- Chi Resurreccion – co-vocals, bass guitar (2003–present)
- Pakoy Fletchero – lead guitar, backing vocals (2005–present)
- Sep Roño – drums (2015–present)

Past members

- Melvin Macatiag – drums (1999–2014)
- Ryan Ronquillo – bass (1999–2002)

== Awards and nominations ==
Year	Award giving body	Category	Nominated work	Results
2007	NU Rock Awards	Song of the Year	"Will You Ever Learn"	Won
2007	NU Rock Awards	Vocalist of the Year	Steve Badiola	Nominated
2007	NU Rock Awards	Best Music Video	"Will You Ever Learn"	Nominated
2007	NU Rock Awards	Producer of the Year	"Every Moss and Cobweb"	Nominated
2007	NU Rock Awards	Album of the Year	"Every Moss and Cobweb"	Nominated
2007	NU Rock Awards	Artist of the Year	—N/a	Nominated
2007	NU Rock Awards	Best Live Act	—N/a	Nominated
2007	NU Rock Awards	Drummer of the Year	Melvin Macatiag	Nominated
2007	NU Rock Awards	Guitarist of the Year	Steve Badiola	Nominated
2008	MYX Music Awards	Favorite Rock Video	"Will You Ever Learn"	Nominated
2013	MYX Music Awards	Favorite Rock Video	"Reverend's Daughter"	Nominated
