= List of Tsinghua University people =

This is a list of people associated with Tsinghua University in Beijing.

== Politics and public service ==
=== People's Republic of China ===
- Hu Jintao - former General Secretary of the Chinese Communist Party, President of China
- Xi Jinping - current General Secretary of the Chinese Communist Party, President of China
- Zhu Rongji - former Premier of China, founding dean of Tsinghua University School of Economics and Management
- Wu Bangguo - former Chairman of the Standing Committee of the National People's Congress
- Wu Guanzheng - member of the Politburo Standing Committee of the Chinese Communist Party
- Huang Ju - former Vice Premier of China
- Zhou Xiaochuan - Governor of the People's Bank of China
- Jia Chunwang - Minister of State Security 1985–1998, then Minister of Public Security
- Lou Jiwei - Minister of Finance

=== Republic of China ===
- Sun Li-jen - Kuomintang general
- Qi Xueqi - Kuomintang General
- Cha Liang-chao - educator and philanthropist

=== Malaysia ===
- Tengku Zafrul Aziz - Minister of Finance

== Science and technology ==
- Qingyan Chen - mechanical engineer
- Shiing-Shen Chern - mathematician, Wolf Prize winner (1984)
- Wang Ganchang - nuclear physicist
- Chao Ko - mathematician
- Guo Yike - computer scientist
- Ma Weiming - electric engineer and naval designer
- Zhao Jiuzhang - physicist
- Wu Youxun - physicist
- Henry X. Liu - Bruce D. Greenshields Collegiate Professor of Engineering at the University of Michigan
- Jinhua Lu - Fellow of the Institute of Electrical and Electronics Engineers
- Xiaoquig Ding - Department of Electronic Engineering professor and supervisor
- Shuyun Zhou - physicist

== Business and entrepreneurship ==
- Min Chueh Chang - co-inventor of the combined oral contraceptive pill (1933)
- Tim Cook - American business executive, chairman of the advisory board for Tsinghua University's economics school
- Anthony Pangilinan - Filipino businessman and media personality
- Stephen A. Schwarzman - billionaire co-founder and CEO of the Blackstone Group, founder of the Schwarzman Scholars at Tsinghua University
- Jiang Bin - billionaire co-founder of GoerTek
- Sun Hongbin (born 1963), billionaire real estate developer

== Arts and social science ==
- Zhang Junmai - metaphysics, Chinese philosophy
- Zhang Dongsun - epistemology, ethics, Western philosophy, Chinese philosophy
- Jin Yuelin - logic, Western philosophy, Chinese philosophy
- Feng Youlan - Chinese philosophy
- Pan Guangdan - writer, sociologist
- Wen Yiduo - Chinese literature, writer
- Zhu Ziqing - Chinese literature
- Liang Shih-Chiu - scholar, Chinese literature
- K. C. Hsiao - scholar, political scientist
- Weiping Wu - dean of the Columbia Graduate School of Architecture, Planning and Preservation
- Wu Wenzao - scholar, sociologist
- Fei Xiaotong - researcher of sociology and anthropology
- Qian Zhongshu - one of the most famous writers of pre-Revolutionary China; wrote Fortress Besieged
- Mu Dan - poet
- Manuel Pérez García - associate professor at Shanghai Jiao Tong University and ERC Grantee 2015
- Liu Yu - political scientist and writer
- Huang Teng-hui - visual arts
- Luo Niansheng - translation of Ancient Greek literature

== Education ==
- Zhou Peiyuan - former president of Peking University

== Others ==
- Amy Lyons - Australian internet personality active in China, took Chinese courses at Tsinghua
- Zhang Yuzhe - astronomer
- Jin Tianming - pastor of Shouwang Church, a very influential church in Beijing

== Faculty ==
- Liang Qichao - philosopher and reformist during the Qing dynasty
- John L. Thornton - former president and co-chief operating officer of Goldman Sachs
- Tsiang Tingfu - historian and diplomat
- Wang Guowei
- Qin Hui
- David Daokui Li - economist and the Director of the Center for China in the World Economy (CCWE)
- Wang Hui
- Laurie Olin - landscape architect and author
- Liang Sicheng - architect and historian
- Chen Yinke - historian and linguist
- Patrick Chovanec - commentator and consultant on Chinese economy and US-China relations
- Lin Huiyin - architect, poet, and historian
- Chen Yinque - historian and linguist
- Jie Tang - creator of AMiner
- Norbert Wiener - theoretical and applied mathematician (Visiting Professor)
- Andrew Chi-Chih Yao - Turing Award winner (2001), computer scientist
- Shing-Tung Yau - Fields Medal winner (1982), mathematician
- Caucher Birkar - Fields Medal winner (2018), mathematician
- Nicolai Reshetikhin - mathematical physicist
- Zhang Li - Dean and Professor in the School of Architecture
- Ma Yuehan - pioneer in physical education and modern Chinese sports

== Nobel laureates ==
- Yang Chen Ning - physicist, Nobel Prize laureate (physics, 1957)
