= Pangilinan =

Pangilinan is an Kapampangan surname used across many ethnic groups indigenous to the Philippines. Notable people with the surname include:

- Anthony Pangilinan (born 1965), Filipino businessman, public speaker, and television and radio host
- Candy Pangilinan (born 1972), Filipino film and television actress and comedian
- Donny Pangilinan (born 1998), Filipino actor, model, singer, host and VJ
- Kiko Pangilinan (born 1963), Filipino lawyer and politician
- Jaclyn Pangilinan (born 1986), Filipino-American swimmer, specialized in breaststroke events
- Manuel V. Pangilinan (born 1946), Filipino businessman and sports patron
- Maria Cecilia Laxa-Pangilinan (born 1970), known as Maricel Laxa, Filipino comedian and actress
- Michael Pangilinan (born 1995), Filipino singer, actor, and model
- Rafael Pangilinan Reavis (born 1977), known as Rafi Reavis, Filipino-American professional basketball player
- Rich Pangilinan, known as DJ Riddler, American dance DJ, producer, remixer, music director, on-air personality
- Rochelle Pangilinan (born 1982), Filipina dancer, actress and recording artist
- Simone Francesca Emmanuelle Pangilinan (born 2000), known as Kakie, Filipino singer-songwriter

== See also ==
- Pangelinan
