= Paolo Valenciano =

Filipino songwriter and director (born 1984)

- Born: October 12, 1984
- Education: De La Salle University
- Occupations: Television director, concert director, singer, songwriter
- Years active: 2010 - present
- Spouse: Samantha Godinez Valenciano (m. 2013)
- Children: 3
- Father: Gary Valenciano
- Relatives: Kiana Valenciano (sister); Gab Valenciano (brother); Kiko Pangilinan (uncle); Anthony Pangilinan (uncle); Sharon Cuneta (aunt-in-law); Maricel Laxa (aunt-in-law); Gab Pangilinan (cousin); Donny Pangilinan (cousin); Josh Buizon (cousin); Kakie (cousin); KC Concepcion (step-cousin)

Juan Paolo Martin Pangilinan Valenciano (born October 12, 1984) is a Filipino recording artist, songwriter, television director, concert director and theater actor-director. He is the eldest son of Filipino OPM singer Gary Valenciano.

== Early life and education ==
Valenciano was born on October 12, 1984 in Manila to Gary Valenciano, an OPM singer and Angeli Pangilinan, a talent manager. Valenciano is the eldest son with two younger siblings: Kiana and Gab.

He is an alumnus of De La Salle University. Valenciano was a member of DLSU Green Media Group, known as Communication Arts Society.

== Career ==
Valenciano started his career as the lead vocalist of indie rock-band Salamin. In 2004, Salamin was formed with members composed of Paolo Valenciano as the front man and lead vocalist, Jr Enrile as vocalist, Sho Hikino as lead guitarist, Mikael Bersales on bass, Mikael Dualan on rhythm guitar and Eo Marcos on drums.

In 2005, Enrile left the band to pursue other career; and a new guitarist, Justin Alfafaea was added to the group. The band released two albums, their self-titled, debut album, "Salamin" and "Hello Anxiety". The rockband served as opening act performer for Gary Valenciano concerts, Bamboo concerts and the American rockband Switchfoot concert.

He pursued a solo career as a recording artist and released his first album, Silence/Sound under Star Records in 2014.

In 2018, Valenciano left his band and decided to work as a full time director.

He is the executive producer of Billboard Philippines team since 2023.

== Personal life ==
In 2013, Valenciano married his bestfriend Sam Godinez on February 7, 2013 in Manila Polo Club. The couple has three children.

== Filmography ==
=== Television ===
Year	Title	Role	Ref.
2012	The X Factor Philippines	himself	
2013	Gandang Gabi, Vice!	Guest	
2014	The Singing Bee PH	himself	
2014	ASAP	himself (performer)	
2015	The Ryzza Mae Show	Guest	
2018-2019	Studio 7	Director	
2022	At Your Home	Project consultant	
2023-2025	All-Out Sundays	Director	
2025	Stars on the Floor	Director	

=== TV special ===
Year	Title	Role	Ref.
2021	"Alden's Reality"	Director	
2021	"Christmas with the G's"	Director	

=== Theater ===
Year	Title	Role	Ref.
2004	"The Lion, The Witch and the Wardrobe"	Peter (actor)	
2015	"3 Stars and a Sun: Musical"	Chino (actor)	
2015	"Sandbox Collective: No Filter 2"	alternate for Mikael Daez (actor)	
2022	"Joseph the Dreamer"	Director	

== Discography ==
=== Studio album as solo artist ===
Title	Album details
Silence/Sound	Release date: 30 September 2014; Label: Star Records; Formats: CD, Digital download

=== Studio album as Salamin (rockband) ===
Title	Album details
Salamin	Release date: 2006; Label: Nugen Records; Formats: CD, Digital download
Hello Anxiety	Release date: 2010; Label: Nugen Records; Formats: CD, Digital download

=== Soundtrack ===
Year	Song	Movie	Role	Ref.
2010	Sir, You Are Out of Line	Dagim	Co-written	

== Concert ==
=== As concert director ===
Year	Title	Artist (s)	Venue	Role	Ref.
2011	"And I love her"	Jericho Rosales	Teatrino Promenade	Co-director	
2012	"On Higher Ground"	Gary Valenciano	Music Museum	Co-director	
2014	"Gary V: Arise 3.0"	Gary Valenciano	Araneta Coliseum	Co-director	
2015	"Fly High that's so Raven"	Gary Valenciano, Ogie Alcasid, Bamboo	ICA, Greenhills	Director	
2015	"Celestine concert"	Toni Gonzaga	SM Mall of Asia Arena	Director	
2015	"From the Top"	Sarah Geronimo	Araneta Coliseum	Director	
2016	"December Avenue Live"	December Avenue	Teatrino, Green hills	Director	
2017	"Martin @35 concert"	Martin Nievera	The Theater at Soliare Resort	Director	
2017	"R3.0"	Regine Velasquez	SM Mall of Asia Arena	Director	
2017	"Gary Valenciano: Love in Motion"	Gary Valenciano	Shangri-la Hotel in Bonifacio	Director	
2018	"Unstoppable"	Darren Espanto	Khia Theater	Director	
2018	"Biyaheng Diyes concert	Mitoy Yonting and the Draybers	New Performing Arts Theater	Director	
2018	"The Best Day of My Life"	Zsa Zsa Padilla	New Performing Arts	Director	
2018	"OA: Ogie Alcasid 30th Anniversary"	Ogie Alcasid	Araneta Coliseum	Director	
2019	"Rico Blanco X IV Spades Live in concert"	Rico Blanco & IV of Spades	Metrotent Convention Center	Director	
2019	"MaestroRy: A Tribute to Ryan Cayabyab"	Ryan Cayabyab with various musicians	The Theater at Soliare	Director	
2020	"The Sweetheart and the Balladeer"	Julie Anne San Jose & Christian Bautista	Urdaneta City	Director	
2020	"Alden's Reality"	Alden Richards	Virtual concert	Director	
2021	"Freedom "	Regine Velasquez	Virtual concert	Director	
2021	"Kuwaderno: A Ben&Ben Online Concert"	Ben&Ben	Virtual concert	Director	
2021	"Christmas with G's"	Sarah Geronimo & Matteo Guidicelli	Virtual concert	Director	
2022	"Iconic "	Regine Velasquez & Sharon Cuneta	Resorts World Manila	Director	
2022	"LUV-ANNE: The Comeback concert"	Anne Curtis	Resorts World Manila	Director	
2022	"JulieVerse: A limitless of talent (love)"	Julie Anne San Jose & Rayver Cruz	New Performing Arts	Director	
2022	"Huling El Bimbo: The Eraserheads Reunion concert"	Eraserheads	SMDC Festival Grounds	Director	
2023	"Sarah G X Bamboo"	Bamboo & Sarah Geronimo	Araneta Coliseum	Co-director	
2023	"Solo (concert residency)"	Regine Velasquez	Samsung Performing Arts Theater	Director	
2023	"The Way You Look at Me"	Christian Bautista	Samsung Performing Arts Theater	Director	
2024	"Juan Karlos Live!"	Juan Karlos Labajo	SM Mall of Asia Arena	Director	
2024	"Sa Ilalim ng mga Bituin"	December Avenue	SM Mall of Asia Arena	Director	
2025	"Simula at Wakas World Tour"	SB19	Philippine Arena	Director	
2025	"Stardust"	Cup of Joe	Araneta Coliseum	Director	
2026	"Get, Get, Aw!: The SexBomb Concert"	SexBomb Girls	SM Mall of Asia Arena	Co-director	
2026	"SANDALI: The Cup of Joe Fest"	Cup of Joe	Philippine Sports Stadium	Director	

=== Guest appearance ===
Year	Title	Artist (s)	Venue	Role	Ref.
2006	"Faces of Love 2"	Gary Valenciano & Zsa Zsa Padilla	NBC Tent	Guest performer	
