= Donny Pangilinan =

Filipino actor, singer, host (born 1998)

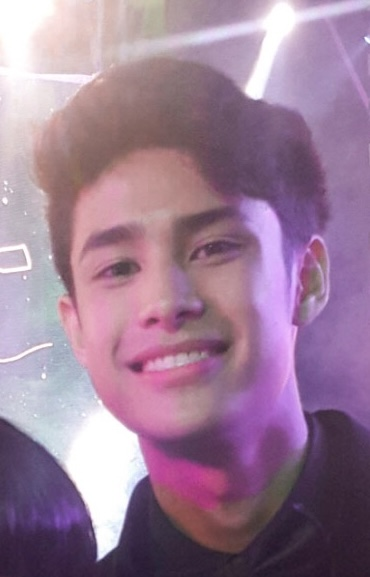
- Pangilinan in 2018
- Born: Donato Antonio Laxa Pangilinan; February 10, 1998 (age 28); Manila, Philippines
- Occupations: Actor; singer; host; video jockey
- Years active: 2016–present
- Agent: Star Magic (2018–present)
- Parent(s): Maricel Laxa; Anthony Pangilinan
- Relatives: Tony Ferrer (grandfather); Kiko Pangilinan (uncle); Paolo Valenciano (cousin); Gab Valenciano (cousin); Kiana Valenciano (cousin); Gab Pangilinan (cousin); Josh Buizon (cousin); Kakie (cousin); Gary Valenciano (uncle); Sharon Cuneta (aunt); Espiridion Laxa (granduncle)
- Musical career
- Genres: OPM
- Years active: 2017–present
- Label: Universal Records (2017–present)

Donato Antonio Laxa Pangilinan (born February 10, 1998) is a Filipino actor, presenter, singer and video jockey. He started his career in 2016 as a video jockey for the pay TV channel Myx. He made his film debut in the Regal Films production Walwal (2018). Pangilinan has since starred in a number of Star Cinema productions, most notably in James & Pat & Dave (2020), He's Into Her (2021), and Can't Buy Me Love (2023–2024).

== Early life and education ==
Donato Antonio Laxa Pangilinan was born on February 10, 1998, to actress Maricel Laxa and businessman Anthony Pangilinan. He has four siblings. He was named after both his grandfathers; his first given name Donato was derived from his paternal grandfather, while his second given name Antonio came from his maternal grandfather, actor Tony Ferrer, whose birth name was Antonio Laxa. Pangilinan studied at Brent International School for secondary education and, in 2018, was admitted into the University of the Philippines Open University.

In October 2022, he earned his Bachelor of Ministry in Christian Leadership degree from the College for Global Deployment. He had the graduation ceremony together with his sisters, Ella and Hannah, who received their own degrees as well.

== Career ==
=== 2016–2019: Career beginnings, MYX, and Walwal ===
Pangilinan started his career in a Koko Krunch commercial alongside his mother. His entry into Philippine entertainment began with guest appearances in various ABS-CBN shows in 2016. He is also a host for the Sunday variety show ASAP, and was a VJ for Myx channel.

In 2018, Pangilinan made his on-screen debut in the Regal Films production Walwal, where he was paired with actress Kisses Delavin. In the same year, he was signed by Star Magic in the same batch as Tony Labrusca and Charlie Dizon, as part of Star Magic Circle 2018. He appeared in the films To Love Some Buddy and Fantastica.

In 2019, the split of his onscreen partnership with Kisses Delavin was reported.

=== 2019–2021: James and Pat and Dave, He's Into Her, and DonBelle ===
In November 2019, it was announced that Pangilinan would be teaming up with Belle Mariano for He's Into Her, an iWantTFC original series based on the Wattpad novel by Maxine Lat (Maxinejiji). Following this, he made an appearance in the film The Mall, The Merrier.

In 2020, Pangilinan played his first lead role in the film James and Pat and Dave with Ronnie Alonte and Loisa Andalio. In the same year, he was one of the hosts for the TV5 variety show Sunday Noontime Live! from Brightlight Productions, which lasted for three months. Pangilinan subsequently renewed his contract with Star Magic in February 2021. He's Into Her premiered in May 2021 after a long delay in production. Its record-breaking launch crashed the streaming platform iWantTFC upon its release due to the surge of the number of viewers who wanted to watch the premiere episode. The series was marked a huge success as it continuously trended throughout its run, and has helped iWantTFC to top all free entertainment apps in the country. It was also the number one most watched series on the streaming platform. For the soundtrack of He's Into Her, Pangilinan collaborated with Mariano for a duet version of the latter's single Sigurado under Star Music. Aside from this, he also released his own version of the series' theme song "He's Into Her" by BGYO. Following the series' success, the cast headlined a special online concert, He's Into Her: The Benison Ball for the fans to enjoy through the streaming platform KTX.ph. VIP tickets for the show sold out after only three days since release. At the end of show, it was announced that a second season of the show will take place. Shortly after the successful concert, ABS-CBN Entertainment also unveiled a documentary about the making of He's Into Her showing the production of the series from conceptualization, auditions, lock-in tapings, the hardships of the entire production team and how they managed to push through during a global pandemic and after the shutdown of ABS-CBN.

=== 2021–2022: Wings, Love Is Color Blind, and He's Into Her 2 ===
In November 2021, Pangilinan released his new single "Wings" under Universal Records Philippines. After the success of He's Into Her, Pangilinan and Mariano landed their first lead roles as a love team in a Star Cinema movie titled Love Is Color Blind. The film premiered through streaming platforms KTX.ph and Smart's GigaPlay app. Shortly after coming to Netflix, the film ranked atop the streaming service's trending lists in the Philippines. Upcoming projects for the pair include a teleserye and a short film to be directed by Cathy Garcia-Molina, in collaboration with the Hong Kong Tourism Board. He was also one of the artists to take part in ABS-CBN's 2021 Christmas Station ID, "Andito Tayo Para Sa Isa't Isa". In 2022, he was among the guests in Belle Mariano's first concert entitled Daylight: A Belle Mariano Digital Concert, which was streamed via KTX.ph. The second season of He's Into Her premiered in April 2022. Upon release of the pilot episode, the series immediately became a trending topic in the Philippines. A movie-cut of the first season of He's Into Her premiered at the Drive-In Cinema One: A Drive-Thru Movie Experience, in partnership with Ayala Malls Vertis North and Vertis North Estate. In August 2022, Star Magic toured in the United States as part of their 30th anniversary celebration. Pangilinan were among the stars who staged the shows. The artists first performed at the Newport Performing Arts Theater, Resorts World Manila, followed by the US shows in Kings Theater, Brooklyn, The Warfield, San Francisco, and in the Saban Theatre, Beverly Hills.

=== 2023–present: Can't Buy Me Love, GG: Good Game ===
In 2023, Donny Pangilinan and Belle Mariano marked their first lead roles in a prime time drama series on Can't Buy Me Love. Pangilinan portrayed the character of Bingo Mariano, a street-smart and hardworking Filipino boy who lives in Binondo, Manila. Pangilinan also starred alongside his mother Maricel Laxa in the esports drama film GG: Good Game, which was released on January 24, 2024. Later on, he co-starred again alongside Belle Mariano in Viu's romantic comedy miniseries How to Spot a Red Flag, and featured as a guest hurado on the noontime variety show It's Showtime during the 2024 Magpasikat anniversary competition. In 2025, it was announced that Pangilinan was selected as one of the new judges for the seventh season of the reality competition show Pilipinas Got Talent.

== Personal life ==
As of 2024, Pangilinan resides in Laguna.

== Filmography ==
Key
†	Denotes productions that have not yet been released

=== Film ===
Year	Title	Role	Notes	Ref.
2018	Walwal	Bobby	Supporting Role	
2018	To Love Some Buddy	Jeremy	Supporting Role	
2018	Fantastica	Pepe Padilla	Supporting Role	
2019	The Mall, The Merrier	Jose Rizal	Supporting Role	
2020	James & Pat & Dave	Dave Verona	Main Role	
2021	He's Into Her: The Movie Cut Part One	Deib Lohr "Sensui" Enrile	Lead Role	
2021	He's Into Her: The Movie Cut Part Two	Deib Lohr "Sensui" Enrile	Lead Role	
2021	Love Is Color Blind	Domino "Ino" Urbano	Lead Role	
2022	He's Into Her: The Movie Cut	Deib Lohr "Sensui" Enrile	Lead Role	
2022	An Inconvenient Love	Manny Siena	Lead Role	
2024	GG: Good Game	Seth Romulo	Lead Role	
2026	Tayo sa Wakas	Cisco Serrano	Lead Role	

=== Television ===
Year	Title	Role	Ref.
2016–2018	Myx	Video jockey (VJ)	
2017–present	ASAP	Host / performer	
2018–2019	Playhouse	Ezekiel "Zeke" Domingo	
2019	Ipaglaban Mo: Dayuhan	Philip	
2020	Alamat Ng Ano	Leonardo	
2020–2021	Sunday Noontime Live!	Host / performer	
2021	Aja! Aja! Tayo sa Jeju	Host	
2021	He's Into Her (season 1)	Deib Lohr "Sensui" Enrile	
2022	He's Into Her (season 2)	Deib Lohr "Sensui" Enrile	
2023–2024	Can't Buy Me Love	Andrei "Bingo" Mariano	
2024	TV Patrol	Guest Star Patroller	
2024	How to Spot a Red Flag	Matteo Iñigo "Matt" Flores	
2024–present	Eat Bulaga!	Guest / performer	
2024–present	It's Showtime	Guest Hurado / performer	
2025	Pilipinas Got Talent	Judge (season 7)	
2025	Pinoy Big Brother: Celebrity Collab Edition	Houseguest	
2025–2026	Roja	Liam Roja	

=== Documentary ===
Year	Title	Role	Ref.
2021	He's Into Her: The Journey	Himself	
2022	All Time HIH: The Road to He's Into Her Season 2	Himself	

=== Music videos ===
Year	Title	Performer	Director	Note/s	Ref.
2017	"Did You"	Donny Pangilinan	—N/a	—N/a	
2018	"Sorry I Left"	Donny Pangilinan, Janina Vela	Benedict Mariategue	—N/a	
2019	"Walk With You"	Donny Pangilinan	Ysa Aranda	—N/a	
2019	"Ngiti Mo"	Donny Pangilinan	Ysa Aranda	—N/a	
2020	"Dream"	Donny Pangilinan, ANDREAH	Donny Pangilinan	—N/a	
2021	"He's Into Her - Donny's Version"	Donny Pangilinan	—N/a	In studio	
2021	"Upuan"	Ben&Ben	Niq Ablao	—N/a	
2021	"Wings"	Donny Pangilinan	Amiel Kirby Balagtas	—N/a	
2022	"Closer"	Belle Mariano	—N/a	—N/a	
2022	"Kahit Na, Kahit Pa (Visualizer)"	Belle Mariano	Edrex Clyde Sanchez	—N/a	

=== Concerts ===
==== Offline ====
Year	Title	Tour	Venue	Note/s	Ref.
2022	Star Magic 30: Beyond The Stars (Manila Show)	Star Magic 30th Anniversary Tour	Newport Performing Arts Theater, Resorts World Manila	In celebration of Star Magic's 30th anniversary.	
2022	Star Magic 30: Beyond The Stars (New York Show)	Star Magic 30th Anniversary Tour	Kings Theater, Brooklyn	In celebration of Star Magic's 30th anniversary.	
2022	Star Magic 30: Beyond The Stars (San Francisco Show)	Star Magic 30th Anniversary Tour	The Warfield, San Francisco	In celebration of Star Magic's 30th anniversary.	
2022	Star Magic 30: Beyond The Stars (Los Angeles Show)	Star Magic 30th Anniversary Tour	Saban Theatre, Beverly Hills	In celebration of Star Magic's 30th anniversary.	
2022	He's Into Her: All Access	—N/a	Araneta Center	He's Into Her Grand Finale Concert	

==== Online ====
Year	Title	Note/s	Ref.
2021	He's Into Her: The Benison Ball	with the He's Into Her cast	
2022	Daylight: A Belle Mariano Digital Concert	as a guest performer	

== Discography ==
=== Extended plays ===
Year	Album	Track listing	Performed by	Label	Ref.
2019	Donny Pangilinan	Ngiti Mo	Donny Pangilinan	Universal Records	
2019	Donny Pangilinan	Did You	Donny Pangilinan	Universal Records	
2019	Donny Pangilinan	Different Kind of Love	Donny Pangilinan	Universal Records	
2019	Donny Pangilinan	Green Light	Donny Pangilinan	Universal Records	
2019	Donny Pangilinan	Walk with You	Donny Pangilinan	Universal Records	

=== Singles ===
Year	Title	Performed by	Label	Ref.
2017	Did You	Donny Pangilinan	Universal Records	
2018	Different Kind of Love	Donny Pangilinan	Universal Records	
2018	Green Light	Donny Pangilinan	Universal Records	
2020	Dream	Donny Pangilinan, ANDREAH	Independent	
2021	Sigurado (Duet Version)	Donny Pangilinan, Belle Mariano	Star Music	
2021	He's Into Her - Donny Version	Donny Pangilinan	Star Music	
2021	Wings	Donny Pangilinan	Universal Records	

=== Appearances ===
==== As a featured artist ====
Year	Title	Performed by	Label	Ref.
2020	Good Night	KARRENCITA, Donny Pangilinan	FUGA Aggregation, Believe Music, Viva Records	
2018	Sorry I left	Janina Vela, Donny Pangilinan	Believe Music, Universal Records	

==== Original soundtracks ====
Year	Title	Show	Performed by	Label
2021	He's Into Her - Donny Version	He's Into Her	Donny Pangilinan	Star Music

==== Station ID ====
Year	Title	Label	Ref.
2021	Andito Tayo Para Sa Isa't Isa	ABS-CBN, Star Music	

=== Composition credits ===
Year	Title	Performed by	Written and Composed by	Produced by	Label
2017	Did You	Donny Pangilinan	Donny Pangilinan, Marcus Davis	—N/a	Universal Records
2018	Different Kind of Love	Donny Pangilinan	Donny Pangilinan, Carlisle Tabanera, Lauren Tabanera	—N/a	Universal Records
2018	Green Light	Donny Pangilinan	Donny Pangilinan, Lauren Tabanera, Theo Martel	—N/a	Universal Records
2018	Sorry I Left	Donny Pangilinan, Janina Vela	Donny Pangilinan, Janina Vela	—N/a	Believe Music, Universal Records
2019	Walk with You	Donny Pangilinan	Donny Pangilinan, Carlisle Tabanera	—N/a	Universal Records
2020	Dream	Donny Pangilinan, ANDREAH	Donny Pangilinan, Andrea Hosking	Kiko "kikx" Salazar	Universal Records
2021	Wings	Donny Pangilinan	Donny Pangilinan, Benicio Bryant, Jon Ingoldsby, Robin Grubert	Jon Ingoldsby, Robin Grubert	Universal Records

== Awards and nominations ==
=== Film and television awards ===
Year	Award Ceremony	Category	Nominated work	Result	Ref.
2022	Seoul International Drama Awards	Outstanding Asian Star	—N/a	Nominated	
2022	VP Choice Awards 2021	Male Promising Star of the Year	—N/a	Won	
2022	VP Choice Awards 2021	Love Team of the Year (shared with Belle Mariano)	—N/a	Won	
2022	VP Choice Awards 2021	Fandom of the Year (shared with Belle Mariano)	—N/a	Won	
2022	VP Choice Awards 2021	TV series of the year	He's Into Her	Won	
2022	7th Push Awards	Push Popular Love Team of the Year (shared with Belle Mariano)	—N/a	Won	
2021	RAWR Awards	Love Team of the Year (shared with Belle Mariano)	—N/a	Won	
2021	Asian Academy Creative Awards	Best Original Programme by a Streamer/OTT	He's Into Her	Won	
2021	Tag Awards Chicago	Best Love Team (shared with Belle Mariano)	—N/a	Won	
2021	Venice TV Awards	Cross Platform Programming	He's Into Her	Nominated	
2019	Box Office Entertainment Awards	Most Promising Male Star for Movies	—N/a	Won	

=== Creator awards ===
Year	Award Ceremony	Award	Notes	Awards Issued by
2020	YouTube Creator Awards	Silver Creator Award	100,000 subscribers	YouTube

=== Listicles ===
Year	Publisher	Listicle	Placement	Ref.
2022	Preview	50 Most Influential	Included	
2022	People Asia	Men Who Matter	Included	
2026	People Asia	Men Who Matter	Included	
