= Maricel Laxa =

Filipina actress

Maricel Laxa-Pangilinan
- Born: Maria Cecilia Ilanan Laxa; February 25, 1970 (age 56); Pasay, Rizal, Philippines
- Other names: Cecilia, Cel
- Years active: 1989–present
- Spouse: Anthony Pangilinan (m. 1993)
- Children: 5 (including Donny)
- Parents: Tony Ferrer (father); Imelda Ilanan (mother)
- Relatives: Espiridion Laxa (uncle); Kiko Pangilinan (brother-in-law); Sharon Cuneta (sister-in-law); Gary Valenciano (brother-in-law); Paolo Valenciano (nephew-in-law); Gab Valenciano (nephew-in-law); Kiana Valenciano (niece-in-law); Gab Pangilinan (niece-in-law); Josh Buizon (nephew-in-law); Kakie (niece-in-law)

Maria Cecilia "Maricel" Ilanan Laxa-Pangilinan (born February 25, 1970) is a Filipino actress. She won Best Supporting Actress awards in the 1992 FAMAS Awards and Star Awards for her role in the 1992 film Iisa Pa Lamang.

For most of her career in the 1990s, she did films with Regal Films and two films with Star Cinema. She appeared in some television series such as Marinella (1999–2001) and Ysabella in 2007. In 2020-2021 she resumed acting in TV5 and portrayed Faith Aguinaldo in the drama Paano ang Pasko and Paano Ang Pangako (Second Season) in 2021. In 2022, Laxa returned to GMA Network to portray Valerie Lim in Mano Po Legacy: The Family Fortune and Gemma Monastrial in Apoy sa Langit. She transferred to ABS-CBN as she starred in the action drama, The Iron Heart. In 2024, she returned to the GMA Network to star in the legal drama series, Lilet Matias: Attorney-at-Law.

== Education ==
Laxa attended primary school at St. Theresa's College in Quezon City, De La Salle Santiago Zobel School in Muntinlupa, and Assumption Antipolo. She spent her teenage years in the United States, where she attended Palisades Charter High School (then known as Pali High School) in Los Angeles, California.. Maricel graduated with a degree of B.S. Social Sciences at the University of the Philippines Manila and earned her Master's Degree in Family Life and Child Development at the University of the Philippines Diliman. She has a doctorate degree in Theology from the College for Global Deployment in Washington State as well.

== Personal life ==
Laxa is married to Anthony Pangilinan and the couple has five children namely Ella, Donny (also an actor), Hannah, Benjamin and Solana. Ella married Enrique Lhuillier Miranda in Puerto Real Gardens, Intramuros on December 6, 2023.. According to UPLB, Maricel is a columnist and motivational speaker on women’s empowerment, parenting, and spiritual development. Alongside her husband, she co-founded the “Intentional Parenting” advocacy, a program that equips Filipino families with practical tools to build strong, values-based homes.

== Filmography ==
=== Film ===
- Long Ranger and Tonton (Shooting Stars of the West) (1989)
- Elvis and James: The Living Legends! (Buhay Pa... Mukhang Alamat Na!) (1989)
- Last 2 Minutes (1989)
- Ganda Babae, Ganda Lalake (1990)
- Makiusap Ka sa Diyos (1991)
- Uubusin Ko ang Lahi Mo (1991)
- Banana Split (Basta Driver Sweet Lover) (1991)
- Buburahin Kita sa Mundo (1991) – Donna
- Ikaw ang Lahat sa Akin (1992)
- Dudurugin Kita ng Bala Ko (1992)
- Iisa Pa Lamang (1992)
- Alyas Boy Kano (1992)
- Hindi Kita Malilimutan (1993) – Jocelyn
- Makati Ave.: Office Girls (1993)
- Ang Ika-Labing Isang Utos: Mahalin Mo Asawa Mo (1994)
- Bocaue Pagoda Tragedy (1995)
- Run Barbi Run (1995)
- Minsan Lamang Magmamahal (1997)
- Magic Kingdom: Ang Alamat ng Damortis (1997)
- Magkaibigan (2008)
- Litsonero (2009)
- My Lady Boss (2013)
- Hello, Love, Goodbye (2019)
- Magikland (2020)
- 1521 (2023) – Ahmani
- GG: Good Game (2024) – Iya

=== Television / Digital series ===
Year	Title	Role(s)
1990–1997	GMA Supershow	Herself - Host
1995–1996	Kadenang Kristal	Hannah
1998	Mula sa Puso	Atty. Elaine Regalado
1999	Marinella	Jessica
2005–2006	Mga Anghel na Walang Langit	Dolores "Loleng" Bello
2007	Ysabella	Young Doña Victoria
2010	Kokey at Ako	Dianne Reyes
2020	Paano ang Pasko?	Faith Aguinaldo
2021	Paano ang Pangako?	Faith Aguinaldo
2021	Daddy's Gurl	Marita
2022	Mano Po Legacy: The Family Fortune	Valerie Lim / Rosemarie Lim
2022	Apoy sa Langit	Gemma Monastrial / Gemma Hidalgo
2022–2023	The Iron Heart	Atty. Helen Gomez
2023	Can't Buy Me Love	Young Catherine
2024	Open 24/7	Margarita
2024	Lilet Matias: Attorney-at-Law	Meredith "Mer" Magbanua- Simmons
2025	It's Okay to Not Be Okay	Olivia Jose

== Awards ==
Laxa has won one FAMAS Award, one Gawad Urian Award, and one Star Award.

Group	Year	Award	Result
FAMAS Awards	(1993)	Best Supporting Actress Iisa pa Lamang	Won
PMPC Star Awards for TV	1993	Best Comedy Actress A.T.M.	Won
Gawad Urian Awards	(1993)	Best Actress Ikaw ang Lahat sa Akin	Nominated
Gawad Urian Awards	(1993)	Best Supporting Actress Iisa Pa Lamang	Nominated
Gawad Urian Awards	(1998)	Best Supporting Actress Minsan Lamang Magmahal Tied with Elizabeth Oropesa.	Won
Star Awards	(1998)	Supporting Actress of the Year Minsan Lamang Magmahal	Won
