= Anthony Pangilinan =

Filipino businessman and media personality (born 1965)

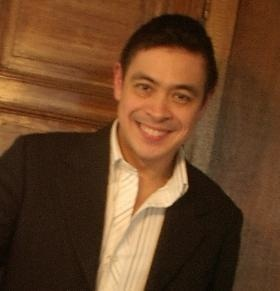
- Pangilinan in 2007
- Born: Anthony Nepomuceno Pangilinan; January 1965 (age 61)
- Education: INSEAD (EMBA); Tsinghua University (EMBA)
- Occupations: Businessman; management consultant; television host; public speaker; writer
- Years active: 1985–present
- Spouse: Maricel Laxa (m. 1993)
- Children: 5, including Donny
- Relatives: Kiko Pangilinan (brother); Tony Ferrer (father-in-law); Espiridion Laxa (uncle-in-law); Gary Valenciano (brother-in-law); Sharon Cuneta (sister-in-law); Paolo Valenciano (nephew); Gab Valenciano (nephew); Kiana Valenciano (niece); Gab Pangilinan (niece); Josh Buizon (nephew); Kakie (niece)
- Website: anthonypangilinan.com

Anthony Nepomuceno Pangilinan (born January 1965) is a Filipino motivational speaker, corporate trainer, businessman, broadcaster, and writer. He is the founder and chairperson of BusinessWorks, a management consulting firm, and has hosted several television and radio programs, including Big News on ABC (1997–1998), IBC News Tonight on IBC (2002), A Second Look on RPN (2004), and The Boardroom on CNN Philippines (2016–2024); he received PMPC Star Award nominations for the latter two programs. Pangilinan has written books on personal development and marriage, including Designed for Success (2010), and co-authored Sabi Ni Mister, Sabi Ni Misis (2014) and Marriage Is a Marathon (2023) with his wife, actress Maricel Laxa. He is also a contributing columnist for BusinessWorld and serves as officer-in-charge of the anti-human trafficking organization Called to Rescue Philippines.

He previously served as international president of the global student organization AIESEC and is the only Filipino to have held the position. Pangilinan and Laxa have five children, including actor Donny Pangilinan.

== Early life and education ==
Anthony Nepomuceno Pangilinan was born in January 1965 to Donato Tongol Pangilinan Jr., an engineer and entrepreneur from Pampanga, and Emma Monasterial Nepomuceno, a public school teacher from Nueva Ecija and Marinduque. He has eight siblings, including Senator Kiko Pangilinan.

During his youth, Pangilinan attended La Salle Green Hills in Mandaluyong, where he became involved in student leadership activities, including service in the student council. In his early twenties, he was elected international president of the global student organization AIESEC. Pangilinan is the only Filipino to have held that position. The role required him to relocate to Belgium and serve full-time, leading him to take a leave of absence from his university studies for approximately two years. After completing his term, he returned to the Philippines to finish his degree in architecture.

Pangilinan earned an executive master's degree in business administration from INSEAD in France and Tsinghua University in China.

== Career ==
=== Business ===
While completing his higher education, Pangilinan founded BusinessWorks, a startup company that provides change-management consulting for corporations. He delivers corporate training on leadership and resilience at business events. Pangilinan leads workshops for companies and seminars on goal-setting. He serves as the chairperson and chief distributor of BusinessWorks.

Pangilinan also owns a Shell gas station in South Forbes Golf City, Silang, Cavite.

=== Media ===
Pangilinan began his career in broadcasting in the early 1990s. He was an evening newscast anchor on PTV's News on 4 from 1992 to 1994, ABC's Big News from 1997 to 1998, IBC's News Tonite in 2002, and PTV's NewsLife in 2016.

In the 2010s, he hosted the weekly radio program Magbago Tayo (transl. Let's Change) on Radyo5 92.3 News FM and AksyonTV.

In 2015, he began hosting the web series Like A Bossing, a magazine show about entrepreneurs which was published on the Digital5 website.

In 2016, Pangilinan began hosting the weekly current affairs program The Boardroom on CNN Philippines. The show had ended its run by the time CNN Philippines ceased its operations in 2024.

=== Writing ===
Pangilinan contributes to BusinessWorld through his weekly Monday column Success Plus!.

In 2010, Pangilinan wrote and published the book Designed for Success: Discover Who You Are and What You Do Best.

He and his wife Maricel Laxa have authored two books together: Sabi Ni Mister, Sabi Ni Misis (transl. Mister Says, Misis Says; 2014) and Marriage Is a Marathon (2023).

=== Advocacy ===
Pangilinan is the officer-in-charge of Called to Rescue Philippines, an anti-human trafficking non-governmental organization.

== Personal life ==
Pangilinan has been married to actress Maricel Laxa since 1993. They have five children together, including actor Donny Pangilinan.

He is an avid runner who has completed all six World Marathon Majors with his wife. Pangilinan has also done triathlons since 2008, finishing an Ironman 70.3 by 2010. In 2024, Pangilinan successfully underwent a cardiac surgery after suffering from heart valve leaks. The following year, he completed his first race since the surgery.

Pangilinan is a Christian. His two favorite devotions are Lettie Cowman's Streams in the Desert (1918) and Oswald Chambers's My Utmost for His Highest (1935).

Pangilinan actively campaigned for his older brother Kiko's vice-presidential election campaign in 2022 and his senatorial campaign in 2025, often speaking on Kiko's behalf at sorties he could not attend.

== Awards and recognitions ==
In 2004, Pangilinan was nominated for Best Public Affairs Program Host at the 18th PMPC Star Awards for Television for hosting A Second Look on the Radio Philippines Network. In 2017, he was nominated for Best Lifestyle Show Host at the 31st PMPC Star Awards for Television for hosting The Boardroom.

== See also ==
- List of INSEAD alumni
- List of Tsinghua University people
