= Gab Valenciano =

Filipino actor-singer

- Born: Jose Angelo Gabriel Pangilinan Valenciano; June 11, 1988 (age 38); Manila, Philippines
- Occupations: Actor, musician, dancer, model, choreographer, drummer, percussionist, director
- Years active: 2004–present
- Spouse: Tricia Centenera (m. 2015; div. 2016)
- Father: Gary Valenciano
- Relatives: Paolo Valenciano (brother); Kiana Valenciano (sister); Kiko Pangilinan (uncle); Anthony Pangilinan (uncle); Sharon Cuneta (aunt); Maricel Laxa (aunt); Gab Pangilinan (cousin); Donny Pangilinan (cousin); Josh Buizon (cousin); Kakie (cousin); Leo Martinez (uncle); Andi Manzano (cousin)

Jose Angelo Gabriel Pangilinan Valenciano (Tagalog pronunciation: [balɛnˈʃano]; born June 11, 1988), professionally known as Gab Valenciano, is a Filipino dancer, actor, musician, host, percussionist, drummer, choreographer, director, and commercial model. He is the son of Gary Valenciano. He was known for his YouTube videos called "Super Selfie".

He is second of three siblings by Gary Valenciano and Angeli Pangilinan. His paternal grandmother is a Puerto Rican of Italian descent. He graduated from De La Salle–College of Saint Benilde.

== Personal life ==
Valenciano and his fiancée Tricia Centenera married in March 2015 with their wedding held at two venues in the Philippines: Tagaytay and Boracay. Valenciano and Centenera divorced in 2016.

In the electoral landscape of 2022, amidst the fervor surrounding the national elections, renowned artist and performer Gab Valenciano publicly affirmed his endorsement for the political lineup of Leni Robredo and Kiko Pangilinan. Valenciano's declaration of support extended beyond mere verbal endorsement, as he actively participated in the rallies organized by the said political lineup.

== Filmography ==
=== Television ===
- Tonight with Boy Abunda - talk show, guest: 2017
- I Can Do That – 2017
- ASAP – variety show, semi-regular artist: 2004–present
- Ay, Robot! – Sitcom, QTV 11, guest: 2007
- Hokus Pokus – sitcom/reality show, guest: 2007
- SOP Rules – variety show, guest artist: 2005, 2007
- SOP Gigsters – Sunday teen show, guest artist: 2005, 2006
- Club TV – dance show, regular host (one season): 2005
- Art Angel – children's show, guest artist: 2005
- Star Olympics 2005 – host
- MTV Pilipinas – guest artist: 2005
- MTV Aids Summit – guest artist: 2004
- ASAP Fanatic – guest artist: 2004
- Star in a Million – guest artist: 2004
- Star Circle Quest – guest artist: 2005
- Myx Mo! – guest artist: 2008
- Umagang Kay Ganda – guest artist: 2008, 2009
- The Sweet Life – guest artist: 2008, 2009
- Banana Split – cast member: 2010–2011
- The 700 Club Asia – guest: 2004–present
- Wowowin - variety show, director: 2020–2022

=== Live appearances ===
- Guest artist, Gary V. Live @ 25, 2009
- Guest artist, Rachelle Ann Falling In Love Concert, 2009
- Guest artist, Philippine Life Insurance Association Anniversary, 2007
- Guest artist, JIL Anniversary, Hong Kong 2007
- Guest artist, JIL Anniversary, Taiwan 2007
- Gary V. US Tour first leg – guest artist, 2007
- Gary V. Pure Inspiration (5 shows) – guest artist, 2007
- Gary V. AT 23 – (series, 10 shows) – guest artist, 2006
- Gary V at the Ayala Malls (4 venues) – guest artist, 2006
- Microsoft Overseas Workers Welfare Administration Joint Launch – guest artist, Makati 2006
- Battle of the Bands – Liwasang Bonifacio, guest artist – 2006
- Philippine HipHop Finals judge/guest artist – 2005
- Skechers Street Dance Competition – host, 2005
- Guest artist, JIL Anniversary, Italy 2007
- Meg Magazine Anniversary – guest artist, 2005
- Gary V. PhilippineTour – (8 cities) guest artist, 2005
- Gary V. Soulful, Waterfront Hotel, Cebu City, guest artist, 2005
- Gary V. Hits Lucena, guest artist, 2005
- Symphony of the Heart – Araneta Coliseum, guest artist, 2005
- Gary V Hits – The Repeat! (4 shows) guest artist, 2004
- Gary V Thankful – Araneta Coliseum – guest artist, 2004
- GaryV Live! Lanao del Norte; guest artist, 2004
- Gary V. Hits Music Museum – (12 shows) guest artist, 2003

== Awards and nominations ==
Year	Award giving body	Category	Nominated work	Results
2008	Awit Awards	Best Performance by a New Male Recording Artist (Performance Award)	"Shake Yo Thang"	Nominated
2008	Awit Awards	Best Performance by a New Male Recording Artist (People's Choice Award)	"Shake Yo Thang"	Nominated
