= Kiana Valenciano =

Filipino singer and songwriter

- Born: Kristiana Maria Mikaela Pangilinan Valenciano; December 21, 1992 (age 33)
- Occupations: Singer; musician
- Spouse: Lisandro Tolentino (m. 2023)
- Father: Gary Valenciano
- Relatives: Paolo Valenciano (brother); Gabriel Valenciano (brother); Kiko Pangilinan (uncle); Anthony Pangilinan (uncle); Gab Pangilinan (first cousin); Donny Pangilinan (first cousin); Josh Buizon (first cousin); Kakie (first cousin)
- Musical career
- Genre: R&B
- Instrument: Vocals
- Years active: 2014–present
- Label: Tarsier Records

Kristiana Maria Mikaela "Kiana" Pangilinan Valenciano-Tolentino (Tagalog pronunciation: [balɛnˈʃano], born December 21, 1992) is a Filipino R&B singer and songwriter. She is the daughter of Filipino singer Gary Valenciano. She started as an independent artist in 2017 with the release of her singles "Circles" and "Does She Know". In 2018, she signed with music label Tarsier Records and released her debut EP, Grey, which included the Awit Awards nominee for Best Performance of a Female Artist, "Caught U".

In 2019, Valenciano released See Me, her first full-length album, which included 10 self-written tracks. In May 2019, she performed in New York City at the culminating concert of Viacom's Asian-American Heritage Month. She then performed a number of shows in Los Angeles, California.

== Career ==
In 2017, as an independent artist, Valenciano released her debut single Circles. This was followed by the release of the hit single Does She Know. In July of the same year. she was featured in the James Reid track Mean 2 U for his album Palm Dreams. In September, she signed with Tarsier Records, which is a division of Star Music. In the same month, she released a new single called Misfits. In February 2018, she released the 4-track EP Grey.

In March 2019, she released her debut album See Me, which featured 10 tracks and collaborations with Curtismith, Sofia, KINGwAw, and Moophs. In September, she collaborated with fern on a track called Sweet. In December, she released the single Hide My Love.

In January 2020, she collaborated with Australian music producer Billy Davis for the song No Rush. In April, she released the single Corners. In May, she collaborated with Cambodian-American singer SATICA in the track called Ambrosia. In July 2020, Kiana was introduced as part of 88rising's Paradise Rising collective alongside other Filipino artists such as Jason Dhakal, Massiah, fern, and Leila Alcasid. As part of Paraside Rising's EP semiluscent, Kiana released the single Safe Place.

== Personal life ==
Valenciano and her partner Lisandro "Sandro" Tolentino confirmed their secret marriage in 2023. They had been living in Los Angeles, California

== Discography ==
=== Albums ===
- See Me (2019)

=== EPs ===
- Grey (2018)

=== Singles ===
As main artist
Year	Title
2016	"Circles"
2017	"Does She Know" (feat. Curtismith)
2017	"Misfits"
2018	"I'll Be There" (with Marcus Davis)
2018	"See Me"
2019	"Sweet" (with Fern.)
2019	"Hide My Love"
2020	"No Rush" (feat. Billy Davis)
2020	"Corners"
2020	"Ambrosia" (with SATICA, AOBeats)

=== Other appearances ===
Year	Title	Album	Ref.
2014	"Dear Heart"	Philpop 2014: Loud and Proud	
2014	"With You" (Gary Valenciano with Kiana Valenciano)	Gold	
2017	"Mean 2 U" (James Reid with Kiana Valenciano)	Palm Dreams	
2017	"Personal" (KingwAw with Kiana Valenciano)	Island City Dreams	
2018	"Tumbang Preso" (Billy Crawford and Kiana Valenciano)	Awit at Laro	
2019	"Permanente" (Quest feat. Kiana Valenciano)		
2020	"Safe Place"	semiluscent	

=== Music videos ===
Year	Title	Director
2016	"Circles"	Mike Carandang
2017	"Does She Know" (feat. Curtismith)	Gabriel Valenciano
2018	"Misfits"	Luis Daniel Tabuena
2019	"5:30"	GeloYellow
2020	"No Rush" (feat. Billy Davis)	Jed Regala

== Awards and nominations ==
Year	Award	Category	Notable Work	Result	Ref.
2019	32nd Awit Awards	Best Performance by a Female Recording Artist	Caught U	Nominated	
2020	33rd Awit Awards	Best Performance by a Female Recording Artist	5:30		
