= Uubusin Ko ang Lahi Mo =

Philippine action drama film

- Directed by: Pepe Marcos
- Screenplay by: Humilde "Meek" Roxas
- Story by: Bernard Factor Canaberal
- Produced by: Wally Chua; Victor Villegas
- Starring: Phillip Salvador; Maricel Laxa; Robert Arevalo; Eddie Gutierrez
- Cinematography: Rey de Leon
- Edited by: Pepe Marcos
- Music by: Jaime Fabregas
- Production company: Moviestars Production
- Distributed by: Moviestars Production
- Release date: July 25, 1991
- Running time: 100 minutes
- Country: Philippines
- Language: Filipino

Uubusin Ko ang Lahi Mo (lit. I Will Consume Your Race) is a 1991 Philippine political action drama film edited and directed by Pepe Marcos. The film stars Phillip Salvador, Maricel Laxa, Robert Arevalo and Eddie Gutierrez.

The film is streaming online on YouTube.

== Plot ==
The Canonigos led by Mayor Placido (Eddie) have enjoyed sole political control of the town of Sto. Niño for several years. But, their abusive reign is threatened when Fortunato Guerrero (Robert) plans to run for town mayor.

== Cast ==
- Phillip Salvador as Lt. Peping Guerrero
- Maricel Laxa as Helen
- Robert Arevalo as Fortunato Guerrero
- Marita Zobel as Pacita Guerrero
- Eddie Gutierrez as Mayor Placido Canonigo
- Michael de Mesa as Frank
- Kevin Delgado as Eddie Boy
- Atoy Co as Jun
- Cathy Mora as Joanna
- Benedict Aquino as Renato
- Eric Francisco as Rupert
- Jeena Alvarez as Neneng
- Dencio Padilla as Mang Bernardo
- Madel Locsin as Estela
- Johnny Vicar as Provincial Commander
- Zandro Zamora as Police Chief
- Nanding Fernandez as Police Chief
- Evelyn Loreto as Mayor's Wife
- Jojo Lapus as Ariston
- Vangie Labalan as Ariston's Wife

== Awards ==
Year	Awards	Category	Recipient	Result	Ref.
1992	10th FAP Awards	Best Supporting Actor	Eddie Gutierrez	Won	
