= Edjop (film) =

2026 biographical film by Katski Flores

- Theatrical poster, designed by Tom Esterra III
- Directed by: Katski Flores
- Written by: Katski Flores; Jade Francis Castro
- Starring: Elijah Canlas
- Cinematography: Neil Daza
- Edited by: Benjamin G. Tolentino
- Music by: Len Calvo
- Production companies: Open Water Productions; Mad Goats
- Distributed by: Warner Bros. Pictures
- Release date: September 16, 2026
- Running time: 122 minutes
- Country: Philippines
- Language: Filipino

Edjop is a 2026 Philippine biographical political drama film directed by Katski Flores and co-written by Jade Francis Castro. Starring Elijah Canlas in the title role, the film is based on the life of Edgar Jopson, a young man from an affluent family who became an underground activist who confronted President Ferdinand Marcos and his regime. It also stars Jodi Sta. Maria, Kakie Pangilinan in her cinematic debut, Cedrick Juan, and Menchu Lauchengco-Yulo.

A co-production of Open Water Productions and Mad Goats, in association with Narra Post-Production Studios, and distributed by Warner Bros. Pictures, the film was released theatrically on September 16, 2026.

== Plot ==
Edgar Jopson is an Ateneo-educated son of a grocer who lived a life of affluence. However, he abandoned this kind of life when he became an underground activist of the Communist Party of the Philippines.

== Cast ==
- Elijah Canlas as Edgar Jopson: The titular student leader-turned-underground activist who was a son of a grocer.
- Jodi Sta. Maria as Joyette Jopson: The second child of Edgar and Joy who is a triathlete.
- Menchu Lauchengco-Yulo as Joy Jopson: Edgar's wife
  - Kakie Pangilinan as young Joy Jopson
- Cedrick Juan as Noy Jopson
- Stefanie Akashi as Andrea
- Teroy Guzman as Hernan
- Issa Litton as Josefa
- Thea Marabut as Inday
- Nour Hooshmand as Sucel
- Jethro Tenorio as Ka Felising
- Nico Locco as Thomas
- Jerome Dawis as Freddie
- Gab Pangilinan as Portia
- Christian Esguerra as Ferdinand Marcos

== Production ==
=== Development ===
Filmmaker Katski Flores made the decision to develop Edgar Jopson's life story into a film in 2021 after triathlete Joyette Jopson, a classmate and Edgar's daughter, approached her at their high school reunion. Later on, the latter accepted Flores' request to begin the project from the first base. Before Flores accepted the project, no director had ever agreed to direct the film while a sequence treatment was already developed.

Cinematographer Neil Daza immediately joined the project, citing that he shared the activist's upbringing. Besides Daza, Jade Castro joined as co-writer while Maki Sarmiento and Erik Manalo were respectively assigned as line producer and production designer.

=== Casting and filming ===
Elijah Canlas was initially offered by the production team to play young Edjop until the production team, including producer Joyette Jopson, decided to cast him also as the older Edjop, citing the successful result from a screen test in November 2023. In 2025, Kakie Pangilinan joined the cast as the young Gloria Maria "Joy" Asuncion, Edjop's wife.

Flores selected journalist and digital content creator Christian Esguerra to act as Ferdinand Marcos, who appears in a critical sequence that lasts less than a minute. Esguerra wanted a journalist role instead, and underwent an acting crash course with actor Ron Capinding, who had played the role of Marcos in the 2023 play The Impossible Dream.

== Release ==
A trailer published on February 2026 announced that the film would be released in the same year. In July 2026, a Philippine theatrical release on September 16 was announced.

Edjop had its international premiere on October 27, 2026, in the Asian Future Competition section of the 39th Tokyo International Film Festival.

== Reception ==
=== Critical response ===
Critics praised the performances and the film's treatment of Edgar Jopson as both a political figure and a family member. Fred Hawson, writing for ABS-CBN, commended Elijah Canlas's portrayal of Jopson, as well as the performances of Jodi Sta. Maria and Kakie Pangilinan, and praised Neil Daza's cinematography, Benjamin Tolentino's editing, and the film's period production design. Wanggo Gallaga of Lifestyle Inquirer similarly praised Canlas's performance for its earnestness and sincerity. Philip Cu Unjieng of the Manila Bulletin praised the cast's performances, particularly Canlas and Sta. Maria; the screenplay for accurate depictions of the 1970s and 1980s and its treatment of history; and Flores's directorial efforts.

Reyza Ferranco of Rolling Stone Philippines regarded the parallel stories of Jopson and his daughter Joyette as a compelling variation on the conventional biographical film, and praised Canlas's portrayal of Jopson's political development and vulnerability. Ferranco, however, found the depiction of the First Quarter Storm insufficient in scale, particularly its representation of the large demonstrations of the period. Tomatometer-approved film critic Paul Emmanuel Enicola praised Daza's cinematography, Tolentino's editing, Canlas's performance, and Pangilinan's film debut, while finding that the film occasionally relied excessively on exposition and its recurring race metaphor. He also said that Jopson's privileged background could have been developed more visually and that the alternating focus on Joyette sometimes interrupted Jopson's story, although he considered the family perspective an element that distinguished the film from a more conventional biopic.
