= Kakie =

Filipina singer-songwriter

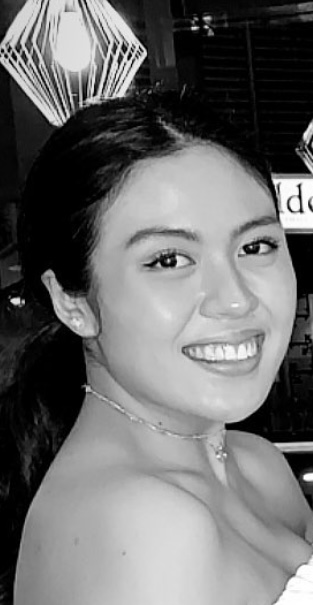
- Kakie in 2020
- Born: Simone Francesca Emmanuelle Cuneta Pangilinan; December 16, 2000 (age 25); Philippines
- Other name: Frankie Pangilinan
- Parents: Sharon Cuneta; Kiko Pangilinan
- Relatives: KC Concepcion (half-sister); Pablo Cuneta (grandfather); Anthony Pangilinan (uncle); Maricel Laxa (aunt-in-law); Gary Valenciano (uncle-in-law); Gab Valenciano (cousin); Kiana Valenciano (cousin); Gab Pangilinan (cousin); Donny Pangilinan (cousin); Josh Buizon (cousin); Helen Gamboa (great-aunt); Tito Sotto (great-uncle-in-law); Ciara Sotto (aunt); Gian Sotto (uncle)
- Musical career
- Genres: Indie pop
- Occupation: Singer-songwriter
- Instruments: Vocals, guitar
- Years active: 2019–present
- Label: Curve Entertainment

Simone Francesca Emmanuelle "Frankie" Cuneta Pangilinan (Tagalog pronunciation: [kuˈnɛtɐ paŋɪˈlinan]; born December 16, 2000), also known by her stage name Kakie (Tagalog pronunciation: [ˈkakɪ]), is a Filipino singer-songwriter.

== Early life and education ==
Pangilinan was born to singer-actress Sharon Cuneta and Francis Pangilinan, who would later be elected as senator the following year. She comes from a clan of performing artists and politicians.

She attended high school at The Beacon Academy in Biñan and took up a college course on literature and anthropology at The New School in New York City, graduating in 2025.

== Career ==
As an infant and child, Pangilinan (then credited by her nickname Frankie) first appeared with her mother, Sharon Cuneta, in television commercials, including Kimbies, Nido, and McDonald's.

In July 2019, Kakie released her first single, "TYL" ("true young lovers"), produced by former Eraserheads frontman Ely Buendia, who also played guitar for the track. It gained millions of streams after she performed it live on Wish 107.5.

In June 2021, she released her seven-track extended play entitled abOUT hER SPACE, led by the track "afterparty" and distributed by her record label Curve Entertainment.

In 2025, she was cast in her first film role as the wife of dissident Edgar Jopson in the biopic Edjop. In August 2025, she was named Chairperson of the Committee on Youth of the Senate Spouses Foundation Inc. during the fourth senatorial term of her father.

In 2026, Kakie released a single, "Kontrabida".
