= GG: Good Game =

- Directed by: Prime Cruz
- Written by: Prime Cruz; Hannah Pangilinan; Zachary Aquino
- Produced by: Pamela .L. Reyes
- Starring: Donny Pangilinan; Igi Boy Flores; Kaleb Ong; Maricel Laxa; Gold Azeron; Ronaldo Valdez; Baron Geisler; Johannes Rissler; Boots Anson-Roa
- Edited by: Renard Torres
- Music by: Andrew R. Florentino
- Animation by: Robosheep Studios
- Production companies: Betelguese Media; MQuest Ventures
- Distributed by: CMB Film Services; Star Cinema
- Release date: January 24, 2024
- Running time: 100 minutes
- Country: Philippines
- Language: Filipino

GG: Good Game is a 2024 Philippine teen sports drama film directed by Prime Cruz from a story and screenplay he co-wrote with Zachary Aquino and Hannah Pangilinan. The film stars Donny Pangilinan, Igi Boy Flores, and Ronaldo Valdez.

It was one of Valdez's final film roles following his death in 2023; the film was dedicated to him.

== Plot ==
GG, an acronym for "good game," centers around Seth, a determined aspiring pro-gamer who immerses himself in the world of video games as the player "Eskape" and gets into a "competitive barkada gaming" while navigating the various challenges within his own family.

Grieving the loss of his beloved grandmother, who raised him, Eskape is compelled to live with his estranged mother, who had abandoned him as an infant. His life changes dramatically when he receives an invitation to join an underdog esports team.

== Cast ==
- Donny Pangilinan as Seth (Eskape)
- Igi Boy Flores as Joseph (XtraRice)
- Kaleb Ong as Santino (Ace)
- Maricel Laxa as Iya (Icebox)
- Gold Azeron as Patrick (Trickz)
- Ronaldo Valdez as Francis
- Baron Geisler as Kurt
- Johannes Rissler as Kelvin (Kev)
- Boots Anson-Roa as Griselda
- Christian Vasquez as Dennis
- DJ Durano as Tito Rexy
- Raemon Oscar Bingcang (Razzie Binx) as the e-sports host
- Manny V. Pangilinan as himself (cameo)

== Reception ==
Riya Singh of Midgard Times rated the film 4.5 out of 10, describing the story as half-baked because of its lack of focus on Seth's personal problems. She praised the actors' performances and the theme of teamwork but found the gaming competitions boring. Januar Junior Aguja of The Freeman gave the film 3/5 stars, describing the film as far from being perfect, but “GG” ticks the right boxes on being a movie that properly represents esports.
