= Tony Ferrer =

Filipino actor (1934–2021)

- Born: Antonio Dising Laxa; June 12, 1934; Macabebe, Pampanga, Philippine Islands
- Died: January 23, 2021 (aged 86); Pasig, Metro Manila, Philippines
- Occupation: Actor
- Years active: 1960–2007
- Children: 4 (including Maricel Laxa)
- Relatives: Espiridion Laxa (brother); Anthony Pangilinan (son-in-law); Donny Pangilinan (grandson)

Antonio Dising Laxa (June 12, 1934 – January 23, 2021), better known by his stage name Tony Ferrer, was a Filipino actor, film director and producer. He was tagged as the James Bond of the Philippines for his films in which he played a spy named Tony Falcon in the Agent X-44 movie series.

He won Best Actor at the Quezon City Film Festival for Sapagkat Sila'y Aming Mga Anak (1970) with Boots Anson-Roa and Vilma Santos. He received the nominations for FAMAS Award Best Actor in Sabotage (1966) and I Love Mama, I Love Papa (1971).

== Career ==
Laxa was born in Macabebe, Pampanga, Philippines to Sofronio Laxa and Eufrocina Dising.

His first film was Kilabot sa Barilan (1960) with Fernando Poe Jr. and Zaldy Zshornack. His next supporting roles were in such war films as Mga Tigreng Tagabukid (1962) and Suicide Commandos (1962) starring Fernando Poe Jr., Romeo Vasquez and Joseph Estrada.

He starred in Marcong Bagsik (1964) with Divina Valencia. He starred as Tony Falcon, Agent X-44 in Sabotage (1966), directed by Eddie Garcia. He did drama films like Living Doll (1970) and The Golden Child (1971) with Snooky Serna. He did action films like Walang Duwag Sa Kayumanggi (1975) with Lotis Key, Mission: Get The Killers On The Loose (1975) with Gina Pareño, Alat (1975) with Chanda Romero, and Jailbreak! (1976) with Alma Moreno.

He was also paired with Niño Muhlach in Wonder Boy (1976). Ferrer was paired with Nora Aunor in Sa Lungga ng Mga Daga (1978).

He starred with Ramon Revilla in Nardong Putik (1972), Lito Lapid in Back To Back (1979), Ramon Zamora in Experts (1979), Rey Malonzo in Deadly Fighters (1979), Ace Vergel in Pangkat Do Or Die (1980), Vic Vargas in Dope Godfathers (1983), Bembol Roco and Efren Reyes Jr. in Over My Dead Body (1983), Fernando Poe Jr in Ang Agila at ang Falcon (1980), Bong Revilla in Chinatown: Sa Kuko ng Dragon (1988), Ronnie Ricketts in Black Sheep Baby (1989) and Jess Lapid Jr. in Isang Milyon sa Ulo ni Cobra (1990).

He also did international films like The Vengeance of Fu Manchu (1967) with Christopher Lee, Cosa Nostra Asia (1974) with Chris Mitchum, Blind Rage (1978) with Fred Williamson, and Cover Girl Models (1975) with Pat Anderson for New World Pictures.

On the July 2, 1981, Ferrer's directorial debut the musical film Legs... Katawan... Babae! premiered, it's a film vehicle for the disco group Hagibis. The film co-stars Myrna Castillo, Laarni Enriquez, Dinah Dominguez Val Iglesias, etc.

Ferrer had special participation as Tony Falcon in the remake of Agent X44 (2007), an action-comedy, played by Vhong Navarro.

He appeared in more than 155 films, including the 21-film series Agent X-44.

== Personal life ==
Ferrer was the younger brother of Espiridion Laxa, producer of Tagalog Ilang-Ilang Pictures and EDL Productions.

He was paired with Mutya ng Pilipinas Alice Crisostomo in The Golden Child (1971), and subsequently married her a year later. They had two kids, actress Mutya Crisostomo and Falcon. He had a daughter with actress Imelda Ilanan, Maricel Laxa. He also had a son, Mark by Pinky Poblete. Ferrer lived with his sister and brothers in Pasig in his last years. He had a non-showbiz partner.

His grandson, Donny Pangilinan, is also an actor.

== Death ==
Ferrer died on 23 January 2021 at home in Pasig, at the age of 86 due to heart illness and diabetic complications.

== Selected filmography ==
- Kilabot sa Barilan (1960)
- Baril sa Baril (1961)
- Mga Tigreng Taga-Bukid (1962)
- Limang Kidlat (1963)
- Dugong Tigre (1964)
- G-2 (1965) - Agent X-44
- Kalaban ng Sindikato (1965) - Agent X-44
- Tatlo sa Tatlo (1965)
- Interpol: Hadlang sa Manlulupig (1965) - Agent X-44
- Sabotage (1966) - Agent X-44
- Frame Up! (1967) - Agent X-44
- The Vengeance of Fu Manchu (1967)
- Masters of Karate (1968)
- Infiltrators (1969)
- Biyak Na Bato (1970)
- I Love Mama, I Love Papa (1971)
- Nardong Putik (1972)
- Dakilang 9 (1973)
- Kung Fu Master (1974)
- Magnum 44 (1974) - Agent X-44
- Death Machine (1975)
- Cover Girl Models (1975)
- Walang Duwag sa Kayumanggi (1975)
- Mission: Get The Killers On the Loose (1975)
- The Interceptors (1976)
- Ben Boga (1976)
- Jailbreak! (1976)
- Cortes (1977)
- Last Target (1978)
- Sa Lungga ng Mga Daga (1978)
- Blind Rage (1978)
- Sabotage 2 (1979) - Agent X-44
- The Experts (1979)
- Ang Agila at ang Falcon (1980)
- Shoot the Killer (1981)
- Over My Dead Body (1983)
- Hanggang sa Huling Bala (1984)
- Boy Tipos (1985)
- Walang Ititirang Buhay (1986)
- Kamandag sa Araw (1987)
- Chinatown: Sa Kuko ng Dragon (1988) - Peter Wang
- Isang Bala, Isang Buhay (1989)
- Black Sheep Baby (1989)
- Kahit Singko Ay Di Ko Babayaran ang Buhay Mo (1990)
- May Araw Ka Rin Bagallon (1990)
- Isang Milyon sa Ulo ni Cobra (1990)
- Ipaglaban Mo Ako, Boy Topak (1991)
- Hepe, Isasabay Kita sa Paglubog ng Araw (1991)
- Digos Massacre (1991)
- Sonny Boy, Public Enemy No. 1 of Cebu (1992)
- Bukas Tatakpan Ka ng Diyaryo (1993)
- Patapon (1993)
- Pambato (1993)
- Geron Olivar (1993)
- Aguinaldo (1993)
- Manila Boy (1993)
- Matinik Na Kalaban (1995)
- Adan Lazaro (1996)
- Tawagin Mo Ang Lahat ng Santo (1997)
- Pards 2 (1997)
- Talahib at Rosas 2 (1999)
- Total Aikido (2001)
- Mahal Kita... Kahit Sino Ka Pa! (2001)
- Akala Mo (2002)
- Enterpool: S.C.I.A., Senior Citizen in Action (2005)
- Agent X44 (2007)
