= Alessandra Lanzara =

Italian-American physicist

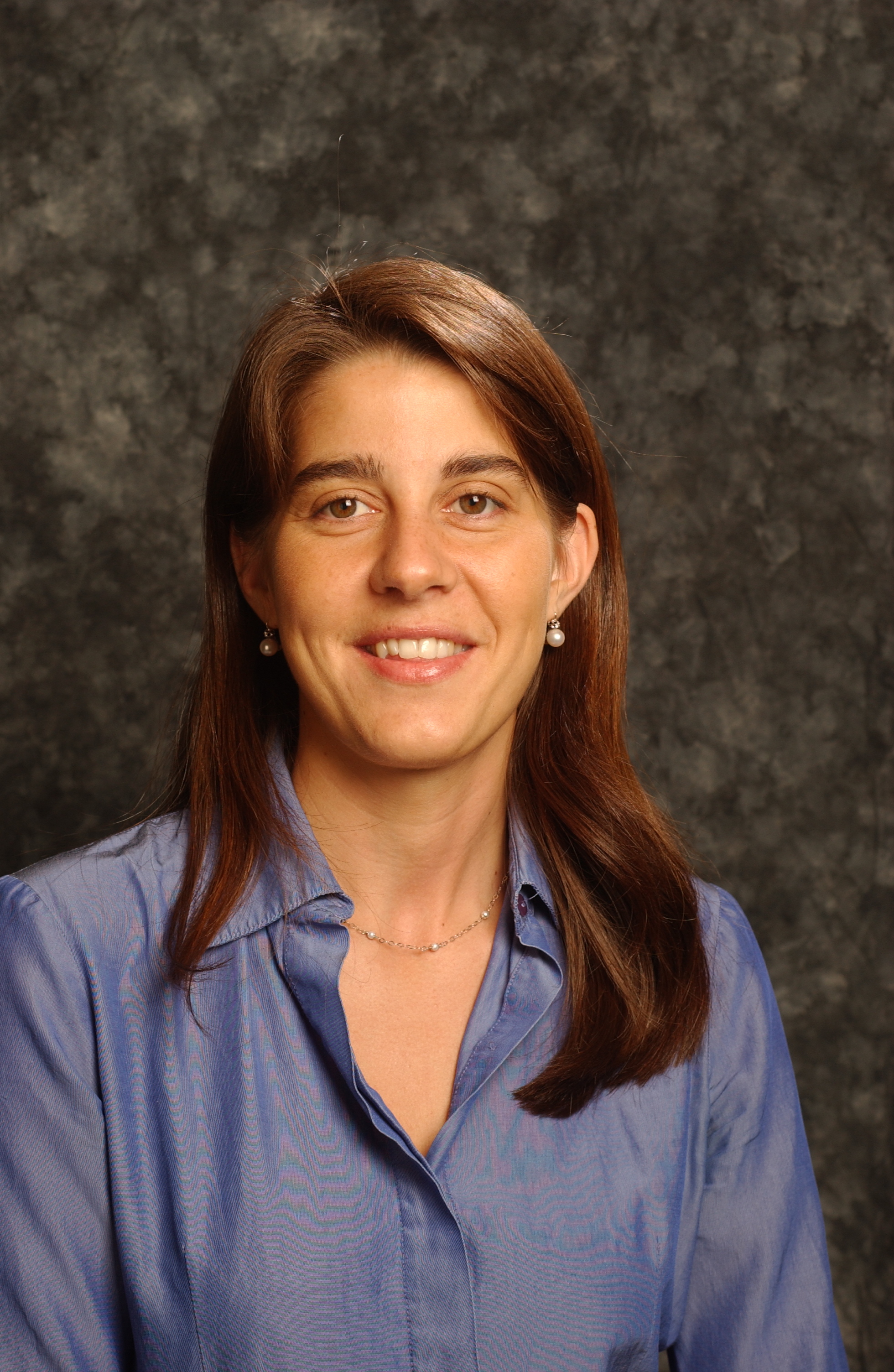
- Education: University of Rome La Sapienza
- Scientific career
- Fields: Condensed Matter Physics
- Workplaces: University of California, Berkeley Lawrence Berkeley National Laboratory
- Doctoral students: Shuyun Zhou

Alessandra Lanzara is an Italian-American physicist and the distinguished Charles Kittel Professor of physics at the University of California, Berkeley since 2002, where she leads an experimental materials physics group. She is the founding director of Center for Sustainable Innovation at UCB and the co-founder of Quantum Advanced Detection (QUAD) LLC.

== Education ==
Lanzara obtained her Laurea in physics (equivalent to an M.S., 1994) and doctorate in Physics and Materials Sciences (1999) from the University of Rome La Sapienza in Italy. Lanzara subsequently held a postdoctoral fellowship appointment at Stanford University until 2002. In 2002, Lanzara joined UC Berkeley Physics Department as assistant professor and was promoted associated professor with tenure in 2006. She advanced to Full Professor in 2011. She was named 2019-2020 Bakar Fellow for advancing her materials work in quantum computing applications.

== Research ==
Lanzara is best known for her original contribution to the study of quantum materials such as high temperature superconductors, topological phases of matter and two dimensional materials. Her contributions include the discovery of spin momentum locking and electron-phonon interaction in high-temperature superconductors, symmetry breaking in graphene, and optical control of spin photocurrents in topological materials. She is also known for developing a new synthesis method that has enabled the synthesis of large wafers of graphene and engineering of its bandage, critical for any electronic applications and for the development of a cutting edge instrumentation to image the spin of the electrons with full energy and momentum resolution. Lanzara holds 5 patents in the US and EU and has coauthored more than 200 papers. She founded QUAD, a company that develops and manufactures high efficiency detection systems for manufacturing process control technology.

== Awards ==
Lanzara is an elected fellow of the American Academy of Arts and Sciences (2022), of the European Academy of Science (2022) and the American Physical Society (2008). In 2015 she was identified as one of the 'Leading Scientists of the World' by the International biographical center in Cambridge. She has received numerous prizes among which the Fibonacci Prize, 2016 and the Marie Goeppert-Mayer Award of the American Physical Society, 2009 In 2014 Lanzara gave the opening lecture for the Centennial of the Italian Physical Society.

== Notable publications ==
- Lanzara, Alessandra; Vishwanath, Ashvin; Hussain, Zahid; Eisaki, Hiroshi; Jozwiak, Christopher; Smallwood, Christopher L.; Zhang, Wentao; Serbyn, Maksym; Lin, Chiu-Yun (2018-12-14). "Revealing hidden spin-momentum locking in a high-temperature cuprate superconductor". Science. 362 (6420): 1271–1275. Bibcode:2018Sci...362.1271G. doi:10.1126/science.aao0980. ISSN 0036-8075. PMID 30545882.
- Lanzara, A.; Lee, D.-H.; Neto, A. H. Castro; A. K. Schmid; Gabaly, F. El; Fedorov, A. V.; Siegel, D. A.; Zhou, S. Y. (April 2008). "Origin of the energy bandgap in epitaxial graphene". Nature Materials. 7 (4): 259–260. arXiv:0804.1818. Bibcode:2008NatMa...7..259Z. doi:10.1038/nmat2154b. ISSN 1476-4660.
- Lanzara, A.; Neto, A. H. Castro; Guinea, F.; Lee, D.-H.; de Heer, W. A.; First, P. N.; Fedorov, A. V.; Gweon, G.-H.; Zhou, S. Y. (October 2007). "Substrate-induced bandgap opening in epitaxial graphene". Nature Materials. 6 (10): 770–775. arXiv:0709.1706. Bibcode:2007NatMa...6..770Z. doi:10.1038/nmat2003. ISSN 1476-4660. PMID 17828279.
- Lanzara, Alessandra; Orenstein, Joseph; Lee, Dung-Hai; Eisaki, Hiroshi; Koralek, Jake D.; Zhang, Wentao; Jozwiak, Christopher; Hinton, James P.; Smallwood, Christopher L. (2012-06-01). "Tracking Cooper Pairs in a Cuprate Superconductor by Ultrafast Angle-Resolved Photoemission". Science. 336 (6085): 1137–1139. arXiv:1206.2300. Bibcode:2012Sci...336.1137S. doi:10.1126/science.1217423. ISSN 0036-8075. PMID 22654053.
- Lanzara, Alessandra; Louie, Steven G.; Fedorov, Alexei V.; Deslippe, Jack; Hwang, Choongyu; Park, Cheol-Hwan; Siegel, David A. (2011-07-12). "Many-body interactions in quasi-freestanding graphene". Proceedings of the National Academy of Sciences. 108 (28): 11365–11369. arXiv:1106.5822. Bibcode:2011PNAS..10811365S. doi:10.1073/pnas.1100242108. ISSN 0027-8424. PMC 3136305. PMID 21709258.
- Miller, Tristan L.; Zhang, Wentao; Eisaki, Hiroshi; Lanzara, Alessandra (2017-02-27). "Particle-Hole Asymmetry in the Cuprate Pseudogap Measured with Time-Resolved Spectroscopy". Physical Review Letters. 118 (9) 097001. arXiv:1703.03884. Bibcode:2017PhRvL.118i7001M. doi:10.1103/PhysRevLett.118.097001. PMID 28306293.
- Lanzara, Alessandra; Shen, Zhi-Xun; Lee, Dung-Hai; Hussain, Zahid; Robert J. Birgeneau; Rotundu, Costel R.; Kemper, Alexander F.; Gotlieb, Kenneth; Sobota, Jonathan A. (2016-10-14). "Spin-polarized surface resonances accompanying topological surface state formation". Nature Communications. 7 13143. arXiv:1609.01842. Bibcode:2016NatCo...713143J. doi:10.1038/ncomms13143. ISSN 2041-1723. PMC 5067600. PMID 27739428.
- Lanzara, Alessandra; Orenstein, Joseph; Lee, Dung-Hai; Eisaki, Hiroshi; Koralek, Jake D.; Zhang, Wentao; Jozwiak, Christopher; Hinton, James P.; Smallwood, Christopher L. (2012-06-01). "Tracking Cooper Pairs in a Cuprate Superconductor by Ultrafast Angle-Resolved Photoemission". Science. 336 (6085): 1137–1139. arXiv:1206.2300. Bibcode:2012Sci...336.1137S. doi:10.1126/science.1217423. ISSN 0036-8075. PMID 22654053.
- Siegel, David A.; Regan, William; Fedorov, Alexei V.; Zettl, A.; Lanzara, Alessandra (2013-04-02). "Charge-Carrier Screening in Single-Layer Graphene". Physical Review Letters. 110 (14) 146802. arXiv:1304.5837. Bibcode:2013PhRvL.110n6802S. doi:10.1103/PhysRevLett.110.146802. PMID 25167021.

== Patents ==
1. Versatile spin-polarized electron source

Patent N: 9142634, September 22, 2015

Patent N: US2011223094-A1;

C. Jozwiak, C. H. Park, K. Gotlieb, S. G. Louie, Z. Hussain, A. Lanzara

2. Method for Synthesis of high-quality graphene

U.S Patent No. 8142754, March 27, 2012

Patent N: US2011223094-A1; US8142754-B2- Issued March 27, 2012

A. Lanzara, A. K. Schmid, X. Yu, C. Hwang, A. Kohl, C. Jozwiak

3. Time-of-flight electron energy analyzer

U.S Application No. 20130126727, May 23, 2013

Patent N: WO2011019457- A1; US2013126727-A1

C. Jozwiak, Z. Hussain, A. Lanzara, G. V. Lebedev, A. K. Schmid, N. C. Andresen, J. Graf.
