= Adan Lazaro =

- Directed by: Pepe Marcos
- Screenplay by: Henry Nadong
- Story by: Roi Vinzon
- Produced by: Espiridion Laxa
- Starring: Roi Vinzon
- Cinematography: Danny Bustos
- Edited by: Pepe Marcos
- Music by: Rey Magtoto
- Production company: EDL Productions
- Distributed by: EDL Productions
- Release date: January 18, 1996
- Running time: 106 minutes
- Country: Philippines
- Language: Filipino

Adan Lazaro is a 1996 Philippine action film edited and directed by Pepe Marcos. The film stars Roi Vinzon (who wrote the story) in the title role.

== Synopsis ==
Lt. Adan Lazaro, a U.S trained Intelligent Agent returns home and goes undercover to hunt down the terrorist group who killed Senator Miranda and stop them from creating chaos and destabilizing the country.

== Cast ==
- Roi Vinzon as Lt. Adan Lazaro,
  - Ian Ignacio as Young Adan
- Sunshine Cruz as Rowena
- Eddie Rodriguez as Col. Roque
- Tony Ferrer as Vertigo
- Roldan Aquino as Gen. Roxas
- King Gutierrez as Norman
- Levi Ignacio as Lito
- Jeanette Fernando as Annette Santos
- Zandro Zamora as Donato
- Berting Labra as Kanor
- Ernie David as Mokong
- Alfred Manal as Buknoy
- Rodney Shattara as Tonton
- Ernie Zarate as Sen. Miranda

== Production ==
Principal photography for the film took half a year to finish. The film had a budget that is twice for a typical action film.
