= Pangelinan =

Pangelinan is the Oceanian variant of Pangilinan. Notable people with the surname include:

- Edward Pangelinan (born 1941), 1st Resident Representative from the Northern Mariana Islands to the United States House of Representatives
- Ben Pangelinan (1955–2014), Guamanian politician and businessman
- Lourdes Pangelinan (born 1954), director general of the Secretariat of the Pacific Community
- Maria Frica Pangelinan, Northern Mariana Islander politician
- Sean Pangelinan (born 1987), Guamanian canoeist
- Susan Pangelinan (born 1961), United States Air Force officer
- Zachary Pangelinan (born 1988), Guamanian footballer and rugby union player

== See also ==
- Pangilinan
