= Xiaoqing Ding =

Chinese engineer

- Education: Tsinghua University
- Occupation: The PhD Supervisor of the Department of Electronic Engineering
- Employer: Tsinghua University
- Known for: Computer engineering
- Awards: "Best Overall Performing Face Verification Algorithm" in the 2004 Face Authentication Test; Graduate Golden Medal from Tsinghua University; Chinese National Science and Technology Progress Awards in 1992, 1999, 2003, and 2008
- Honours: Fellow of the International Association for Pattern Recognition and for the Institute of Electrical and Electronics Engineers

Xiaoqing Ding is a Chinese electric engineer and a professor and the PhD Supervisor of the Department of Electronic Engineering at Tsinghua University in Beijing. She focuses on the fields of facial recognition and multilingual character and document recognition with such languages as Chinese, Japanese, Korean, Mongolian, Tibetan, Uighur, Arabic, and English. Her technologies have been marketed to many large companies, such as Microsoft Office, and are used worldwide.

== Awards ==
Ding was awarded China's most prestigious four National Science and Technology Progress Awards in 1992, 1999, 2003, and 2008. She also won the award for "Best Overall Performing Face Verification Algorithm" in the 2004 Face Authentication Test at International Association for Pattern Recognition's 2004 event and received the better performance in FRVT2006.

She was also awarded the graduate Golden Medal from Tsinghua University.

She was named a fellow of the Institute of Electrical and Electronics Engineers in 2011. She was also awarded a fellowship with the International Association for Pattern Recognition.
