= Zhang Li (architect) =

Chinese architect and academic

- 张利
- Born: 1970 (age 55–56); Beijing, China
- Other name: Li Brian Chang
- Occupations: Architect and academic

Academic background
- Education: M., Architecture; PhD., Engineering
- Alma mater: Tsinghua University

Academic work
- Institutions: Tsinghua University

Zhang Li (张利) is a Chinese architect and academic serving as Dean and Professor in the School of Architecture at Tsinghua University. He is also the vice-president of Region IV of the International Union of Architects (UIA) and Editor-in-Chief of the World Architecture Magazine.

Li is a Changjiang Scholar appointed by the Ministry of Education and National Master of Engineering Design and Geotechnique Investigation. He has received awards for Atelier TeamMinus, including the AR+D Highly Commended Award in 2013, the 2014 ArchMarathon Best Art and Culture Building Award, the Zumtobel Group Award for Young Professionals in 2017, the 2019 International Urban Project Award from Bauwelt and World Architecture Magazine, and the Certificate of Recognition from the United Nations Economic and Social Commission for Asia and the Pacific in 2021. He won the 11th Liang Sicheng Architecture Prize in 2023, sponsored by the Architectural Society of China (ASC) and supported by the International Union of Architects (UIA).

== Education and career ==
Born in Beijing, China, in 1970, Li earned a Master of Architecture and a PhD in Engineering from the School of Architecture at Tsinghua University under the supervision of Guan Zhaoye. He began his academic career at Tsinghua University, where he became a professor. He has also held visiting appointments at institutions such as the National University of Singapore (2010), Syracuse University (2012), and the Polytechnic University of Turin (2017). Additionally, he has delivered lectures at the Harvard Graduate School of Design, the University of Hong Kong, the Berlage Institute, the University of Pennsylvania, the Royal Institute of British Architects, and other institutions.

In 2001, Li founded Atelier TeamMinus as a design studio, which he developed into a professional architectural firm by 2005. In 2011, he incorporated it into the Architectural Design and Research Institute of Tsinghua University.

== Contributions ==
Li founded Urban Ergonomics, an interdisciplinary domain focused on creating livable spaces and design intervention technologies.

Li's engagement extended to the Beijing 2022 Olympic Winter Games, having led the development of competition venues including the Zhangjiakou Zone, the National Ski Jumping Center ('Snow Ruyi'), and the Big Air Shougang. Furthermore, he curated the Chinese Pavilion at the Biennale Architettura 2021 - The 17th International Architecture Exhibition.

== Awards and honors ==
- 2013 – Highly Commended Award, AR+D
- 2014 – Best Art and Culture Building, ArchMarathon
- 2017 – Award for Young Professionals, Zumtobel Group
- 2019 – International Urban Project Award, Bauwelt and World Architecture Magazine
- 2021 – Certificate of Recognition, United Nations Economic and Social Commission for Asia and the Pacific
- 2023 – Liang Sicheng Architecture Prize, Architectural Society of China (ASC) and the International Union of Architects (UIA)

== Selected works ==
- Jinchang Culture Center, Jinchang, China (2008)
- “Xin-Jiu-Zhou-Qing-Yan” Roof Garden, China Pavilion, Expo, Shanghai, China (2010)
- Jianamani Visitor Center, Yushu, China (2013)
- Aranya Idea Camp and Community Center, Qinhuangdao, China (2017)
- Piazza and Art Space, Horticulture Village, Gujiaying, Beijing, China (2019)
- Big Air Shougang, Beijing, China (2019)
- National Ski Jumping Center, Beijing, China (2021)
- Pavilion of People's Republic of China, 17th International Architecture Exhibition, Biennale Architettura, Italy (2021)
