= List of Sarah Geronimo live performances =

Filipino artist live performances

Filipino singer, actress, and performer Sarah Geronimo has been a prominent figure in the Philippine entertainment industry since winning Star for a Night in 2003. Known for her powerful vocals and dynamic stage presence, Geronimo has headlined numerous concerts, tours, television specials, and festival appearances locally and internationally. This is a comprehensive list of her notable live performances across her career.

== Headlining Concerts & Tours ==
=== Popstar: A Dream Come True ===
Location	Date	Venue	Associated album	Notes	Ref.
San Juan	October 4, 2003	Music Museum	Popstar: A Dream Come True	Her first major solo concert	
San Juan	October 24, 2003	Music Museum	Popstar: A Dream Come True	Her first major solo concert	

=== The Other Side ===
Location	Date	Venue	Notes	Ref.
Quezon City	September 30, 2005	Araneta Coliseum	Her first solo arena concert	

=== In Motion ===
Location	Date	Venue	Notes	Ref.
Quezon City	July 14, 2007	Araneta Colisuem	Her first major solo concert	
Ohio	August 18, 2007	Dayton Convention Center		
Hongkong	February 28, 2008	Charter Garden	Her first concert in Hong Kong	
Candon CIty	April 19, 2008	Beach Area	20,000 in attendance	
Camarines Sur	December 5, 2009			

=== The Next One ===
Location	Date	Venue	Notes	Ref.
Quezon City	November 8, 2008	Araneta Coliseum	One-night only concert	
