= Henry X. Liu =

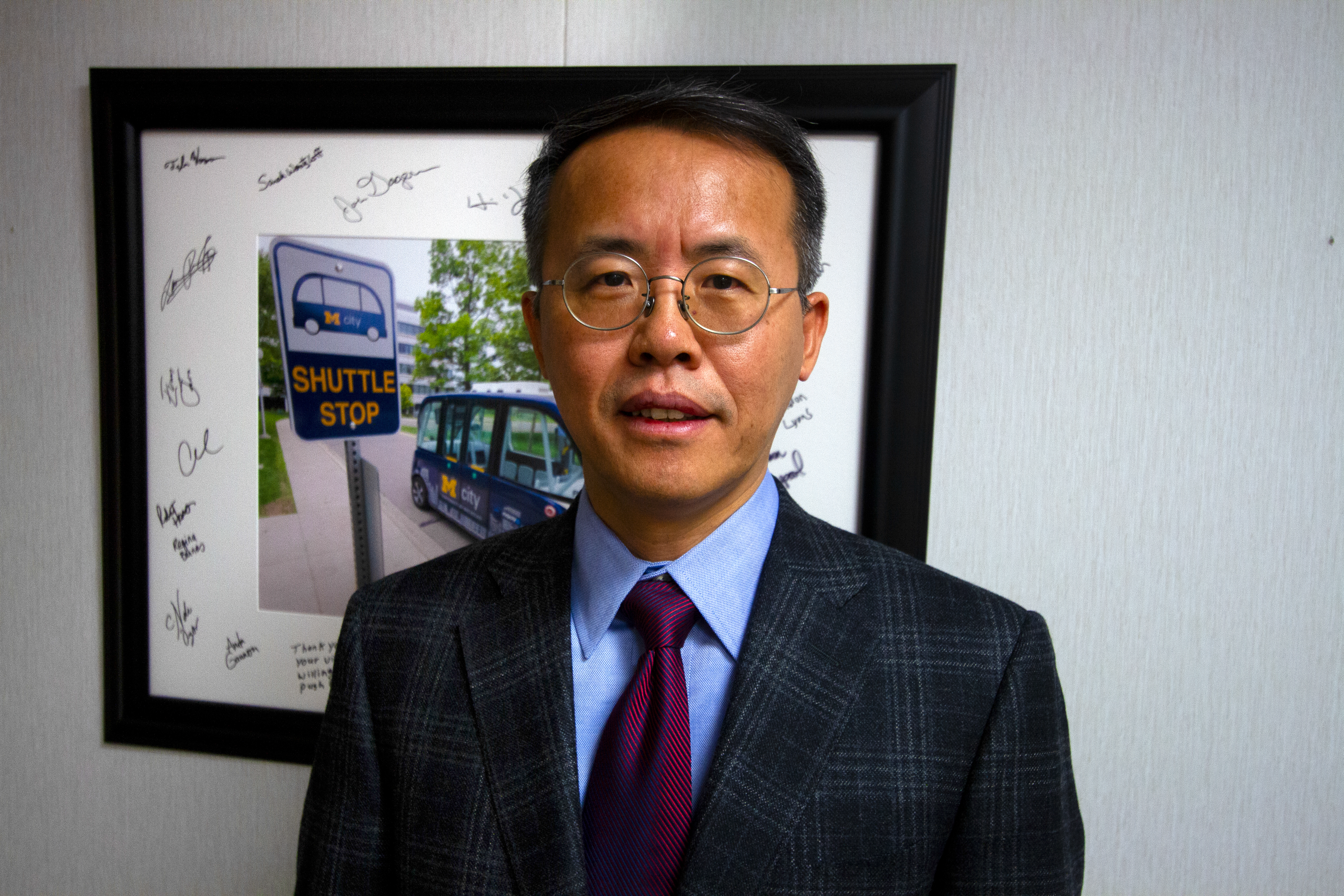
- Occupations: Engineer, academic and an author

Academic background
- Education: B.Eng., Automotive Engineering; Ph.D., Civil and Environmental Engineering
- Alma mater: Tsinghua University (B.Eng.); University of Wisconsin (Ph.D.)

Henry X. Liu (Chinese: 刘向宏) is a Chinese American engineer, academic and an author. He is the Bruce D. Greenshields Collegiate Professor of Engineering, the Director of Mcity, a professor of Civil and Environmental Engineering, a Professor of Mechanical Engineering, and a research professor at the University of Michigan Transportation Institute.

Liu is known for his contributions to traffic flow monitoring, modeling and control as well as for his work in testing and evaluating connected and automated vehicles. He has published over 140 peer-reviewed journal articles, with an h-index of 64, in journals such as Nature, Nature Communications, and Transportation Research Part A, B, C. His research has been featured in media outlets including the Associated Press, Wall Street Journal, CNBC, and Forbes.

Liu is the Managing Editor of the Journal of Intelligent Transportation Systems.

== Education ==
Liu completed his Bachelor of Engineering in Automotive Engineering from Tsinghua University in 1993. In 2000, he completed his Ph.D. in Civil and Environmental Engineering from the University of Wisconsin-Madison.

== Career ==
Liu joined the California PATH Program at the University of California, Berkeley, as a postdoctoral researcher from 2000 to 2003. From 2003 to 2005, he was an Assistant Professor of Civil and Environmental Engineering at Utah State University. He then moved to the University of Minnesota-Twin Cities, where he served as an assistant professor of Civil Engineering from 2005 to 2011, followed by appointment as an Associate Professor from 2011 to 2014. Since 2014, he has been a professor of Civil and Environmental Engineering at the University of Michigan, and in 2023, he was appointed as the Bruce D. Greenshields Collegiate Professor of Engineering at the University of Michigan. Since 2016, he has been the Director of the Center for Connected and Automated Transportation (CCAT) at the University of Michigan Transportation Research Institute and since 2022, he has been the Director of Mcity. He has been appointed as the new director of the expanded UMTRI, which now includes Mcity, and will officially assume his role on March 1, 2025.

In 2011, he co-founded SMART Signal Technologies and served as chairman of its advisory board until 2014. From 2017 to 2019, he was a DiDi Fellow and Chief Scientist at DiDi Global. He is a board member of professional organizations, including IEEE ITS Society, ITS America, and the American Center for Mobility.

== Research ==
Liu has conducted research at the intersection of transportation engineering, automotive engineering, and artificial intelligence. He is most known for his fundamental research in the area of cyber-physical transportation systems, particularly on testing/evaluation of autonomous vehicles and the development of smart traffic signal systems. He is among the first to develop a systematic methodology to test the behavior competence of autonomous vehicles. He and his research group made the methodological innovation for training AI-based agents to learn when to execute what adversarial maneuver. The advancement is enabled by the development of the dense deep reinforcement learning (D2RL) approach, which allows neural networks to learn from densified information with safety-critical events and achieves tasks that are intractable for the traditional deep reinforcement learning approach. The paper detailing this innovation was published in Nature and featured as the cover story of the March 23, 2023 issue.

Liu also developed the OSaaS (Optimizing Signals as a Service) system, a technology that enables real-time optimization of traffic signal timing without requiring additional infrastructure or fixed-location sensors. The system utilizes vehicle trajectory data from connected vehicles, such as those equipped with GPS or navigation systems, to dynamically adjust traffic signals. The technology relies on data-driven optimization models capable of measuring signal performance, diagnosing issues, and optimizing timing parameters in real time. Furthermore, all computations are performed in the cloud, allowing for efficient scalability. The methodology and applications of the OSaaS system were outlined in a paper published in Nature Communications.

Liu's team developed the world's first traffic signal optimization system based on connected vehicles, known as OSaaS (Optimizing Signals as a Service), which was subsequently licensed to DiDi and General Motors (GM). With his team, he also developed an AR testing platform and a scenario generation method (NADE) for autonomous vehicles. He also developed an advanced method for collecting high-resolution data from traffic signal systems, utilizing this data to enhance the optimization of traffic signal parameters.

== Selected articles ==
- Liu, H.X. and Feng, S. (2024) Curse of Rarity for Autonomous Vehicles, Nature Communications, 15(1), 4808. https://doi.org/10.1038/s41467-024-49194-0
- Wang, X., Jerome, Z., Wang, Z., Zhang, C., Shen, S., Kumar, V., Bai, F., Krajewski, P., Deneau, D., Jawad, A., Jones, R., Piotrowicz, G., and Liu, H.X. (2024) Traffic light optimization with low penetration rate vehicle trajectory data, Nature Communications 15, 1306, DOI: 10.1038/s41467-024-45427-4.
- Feng, S., Sun, H., Yan, X., Zhu, H., Zou, Z., Shen, S., and Liu H.X. (2023). Dense reinforcement learning for safety validation of autonomous vehicles. Nature 615, 620–627. https://doi.org/10.1038/s41586-023-05732-2.
- Yan, X., Zou, Z., Zhu, H., Sun, H., and Liu H.X. (2023). Learning naturalistic driving environment with statistical realism. Nature Communications 14, 2037. https://doi.org/10.1038/s41467-023-37677-5.
- Feng, S., Yan, X., Sun, H., Feng, Y., and Liu H. (2021) Intelligent driving intelligence test for autonomous vehicles with naturalistic and adversarial environment, Nature Communications, DOI: 10.1038/s41467-021-21007-8.
- Zheng, J., and Liu, H. X. (2017). Estimating traffic volumes for signalized intersections using connected vehicle data. Transportation Research Part C: Emerging Technologies, 79, 347–362.
- Liu, H. X., Wu, X., Ma, W., & Hu, H. (2009). Real-time queue length estimation for congested signalized intersections. Transportation research part C: emerging technologies, 17(4), 412–427.
