= Shuyun Zhou =

Chinese physicist

- Education: University of California, Berkeley
- Scientific career
- Thesis: Dirac fermions in graphene and graphite : a view from angle-resolved photoemission spectroscopy (2007)
- Doctoral advisor: Alessandra Lanzara

Shuyun Zhou is a Chinese physicist and a tenured professor of physics at Tsinghua University. She is the distinguished Professor of the 2017 "Cheung Kong Scholars" of the Ministry of Education of the People's Republic of China, and won the 13th "China Young Women Scientists Award".

== Education and career ==
Shuyun obtained her B.S. in Physics (2002) from the Tsinghua University in China. She earned her Ph.D. degree in 2007 at University of California, Berkeley where she worked with Alessandra Lanzara. She did postdoctoral research at Lawrence Livermore National Laboratory and was a project scientist there until 2012 when she moved to Tsinghua University where she was named professor in 2017.

== Research ==
Zhoul is known for her work on the electronic structure of two-dimensional materials and heterostrucures. This work includes investigations into graphene and Dirac fermion.

== Awards ==
In February 2017, she was received the a fellowship from the L'Oréal-UNESCO For Women in Science China program, also known as the China Young Women Scientists Award. She received the Sir Martin Wood Prize for physical science research in China in 2019.

== Selected publications ==
- Zhou, S. Y.; Gweon, G.-H.; Graf, J.; Fedorov, A. V.; Spataru, C. D.; Diehl, R. D.; Kopelevich, Y.; Lee, D.-H.; Louie, Steven G.; Lanzara, A. (2006). "First direct observation of Dirac fermions in graphite". Nature Physics. 2 (9): 595–599. arXiv:cond-mat/0608069. Bibcode:2006NatPh...2..595Z. doi:10.1038/nphys393. ISSN 1745-2473.
- Zhou, S. Y.; Siegel, D. A.; Fedorov, A. V.; Lanzara, A. (2008-08-20). "Metal to Insulator Transition in Epitaxial Graphene Induced by Molecular Doping". Physical Review Letters. 101 (8) 086402. arXiv:0807.4791. Bibcode:2008PhRvL.101h6402Z. doi:10.1103/PhysRevLett.101.086402. ISSN 0031-9007. PMID 18764644.
- Deng, Ke; Wan, Guoliang; Deng, Peng; Zhang, Kenan; Ding, Shijie; Wang, Eryin; Yan, Mingzhe; Huang, Huaqing; Zhang, Hongyun; Xu, Zhilin; Denlinger, Jonathan; Fedorov, Alexei; Yang, Haitao; Duan, Wenhui; Yao, Hong (2016). "Experimental observation of topological Fermi arcs in type-II Weyl semimetal MoTe2". Nature Physics. 12 (12): 1105–1110. arXiv:1603.08508. doi:10.1038/nphys3871. ISSN 1745-2473.
- Zhou, S. Y.; Gweon, G.-H.; Fedorov, A. V.; First, P. N.; de Heer, W. A.; Lee, D.-H.; Guinea, F.; Castro Neto, A. H.; Lanzara, A. (2007). "Substrate-induced bandgap opening in epitaxial graphene". Nature Materials. 6 (10): 770–775. arXiv:0709.1706. Bibcode:2007NatMa...6..770Z. doi:10.1038/nmat2003. ISSN 1476-1122. PMID 17828279.
