= Gary Valenciano =

Filipino singer (born 1964)

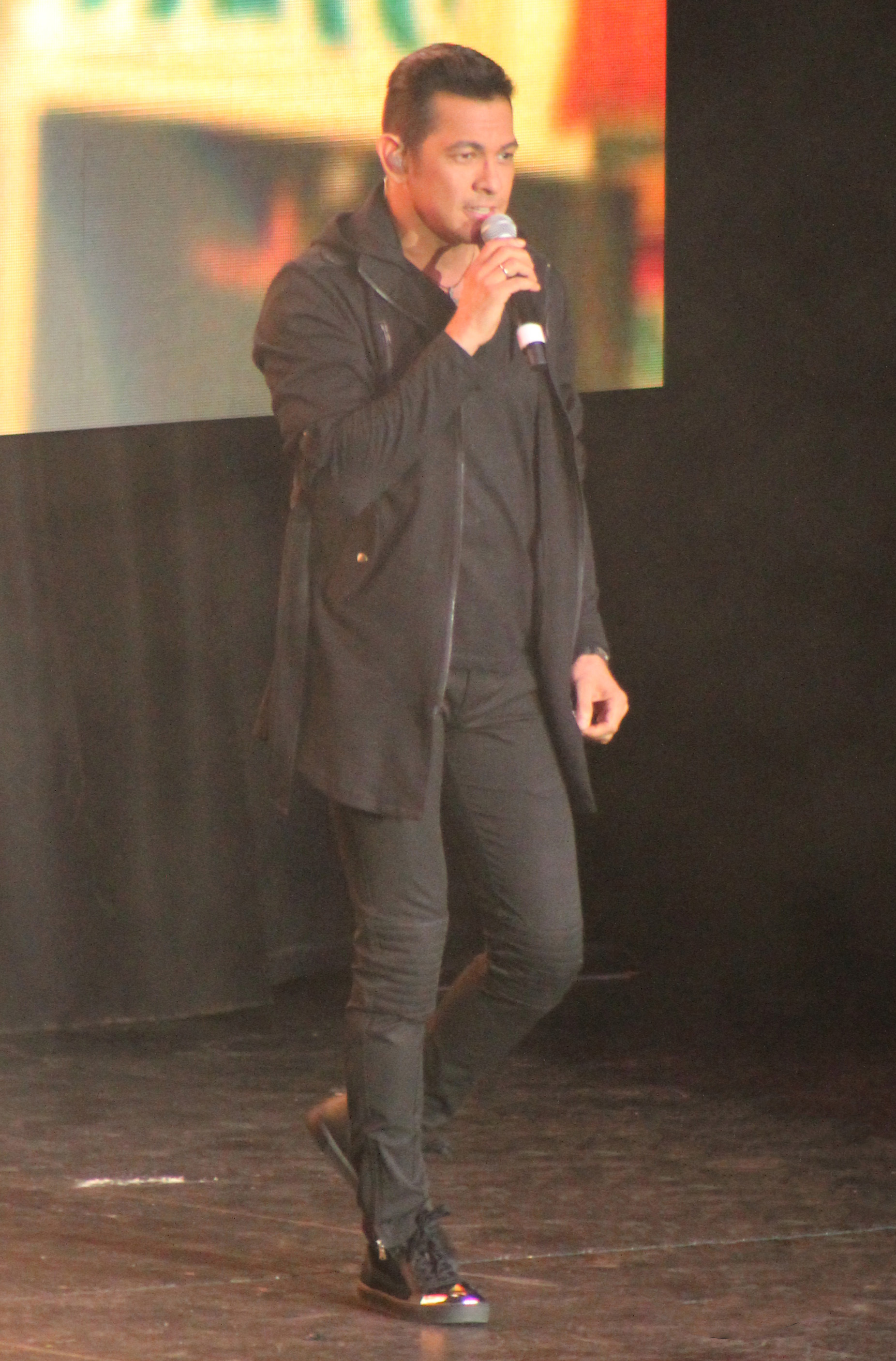
- Valenciano performing in Toronto in 2014
- Born: Edgardo Jose Santiago Valenciano; August 6, 1964 (age 61); Santa Mesa, Manila, Philippines
- Occupations: Singer; musician; dancer; record producer; actor; television host; reality show judge
- Agent: Star Magic (2024–present)
- Works: Discography
- Spouse: Angeli Pangilinan (m. 1984)
- Children: Paolo Valenciano; Gabriel Valenciano; Kiana Valenciano
- Relatives: Kiko Pangilinan (brother-in-law); Anthony Pangilinan (brother-in-law); Leo Martinez (brother-in-law); Sharon Cuneta (sister-in-law); Maricel Laxa (sister-in-law); Chito Miranda (nephew); Neri Naig (niece-in-law)
- Musical career
- Genres: OPM; pop; inspirational
- Instruments: Vocals; piano; drums; percussion
- Years active: 1982–present
- Labels: Star Music; Vicor Music; Universal Records
- Website: garyv.com

Edgardo Jose "Gary" Santiago Valenciano (born August 6, 1964) is a Filipino singer and actor. Known for his musical versatility and performances, he is a recipient of various accolades, including 12 Awit Awards, three FAMAS Awards, and a Myx Magna Award.

Valenciano began his career in 1984 with the release of his self-titled debut album. In the succeeding years, he has ventured on screen, with appearances in several films and television shows. He has performed alongside artists such as Brian McKnight, George Duke, Paul Jackson Jr., Michael Shapiro, Ricky Martin, Cliff Richard, Leon Patilo, Michael W. Smith, Sandi Patti, Steven Curtis Chapman, and Kool & the Gang. Valenciano is also a philanthropist, having been appointed as the country's first UNICEF National Ambassador in 1997.

He is one of ABS-CBN's contract artists and has been a mainstay co-host of the weekly variety show ASAP since 2003.

== Early life and education ==
Edgardo Jose Santiago Valenciano was born in the Santa Mesa district of the City of Manila on August 6, 1964. He is the sixth of the seven children of Vicente Calacas Valenciano, a Bicolano from Camalig, Albay, and Grimilda Santiago y Olmo (1934–2019) from Arecibo, Puerto Rico. His parents met in New York City, married, and settled in Manila. His mother is a Puerto Rican of Italian descent who sang opera in Manila during the 1960s. Valenciano attended primary and secondary school in La Salle Green Hills, and was a part of the Kundirana.

== Career ==
In 1978, at 14 years old, Valenciano made his first television appearance in an advertisement for Fress Gusto, a now-discontinued soft drink sold by San Miguel Corporation.

He started as a choir singer, then launched his career in singing and show business on May 13, 1983. He first appeared as a solo artist in 1982 in the television programme The Pilita and Jackie Show, and later in Germspesyal and Penthouse Live.

He had his first solo concert in April 1984 at the Araneta Coliseum, followed by a number of albums. Three of his albums were released internationally, including the Christian-inspired album Out of the Dark. He won the Awit Award twelve times in the "Best Male Recording" category alone. He has been called "Mr. Pure Energy" due to his high energy dance performances in concerts.

As an actor, he won the "Best Single Performance by an Actor" trophy when he performed in a drama television movie for GMA Network in the '90s. He has appeared in 14 full-length films as the lead actor for some of the top movie companies like Viva Films, Regal Films, Seiko Films, and Star Cinema, with leading ladies like Vilma Santos, Maricel Soriano, Lorna Tolentino, Kris Aquino, Sharon Cuneta, Gretchen Barretto, Princess Punzalan, and Ms. Universe 1993 Dayanara Torres.

As an inspirational artist, he recorded a number of Christian albums and was chosen to do a music video for the Billy Graham Evangelistic Association (BGEA) for a song he co-wrote, "Could You Be Messiah," in 1994. He was then tapped for Global Mission in Puerto Rico in 1994 where he performed with Michael W. Smith and Steve Green. BGEA tapped him as well as in Amsterdam 2000 where he performed for over 10,500 evangelists. He is a member of the Board of Trustees of Christian Broadcasting Network, producers of The 700 Club. He performed at the 50th anniversary of CBN in Virginia Beach and has guested on The 700 Club USA many times.

As a performing artist, Valenciano has performed all over the world, including in North America, Asia, Europe, Oceania, the Middle East and elsewhere. In the '80s and '90s he was dubbed "the Michael Jackson of the Philippines", and continues to hold concerts all over the world in major venues.

In 1998, he became UNICEF Philippines' first National Ambassador. In 2006, the Doha Asian Games Organising Committee has named Gary Valenciano the official performer of the Asian Games' theme song, "Side By Side". In 2008, he marked his tenth year as a UNICEF Ambassador with a visit to Sitio Avocado, a former war zone in Negros Oriental.

Valenciano returned to acting in 2008 by appearing in the drama anthology Maalaala Mo Kaya, where he portrayed a prisoner who finds religion and becomes a born again Christian. That same year, he was nominated for "Best Single Performance by an Actor" in the 22nd PMPC Star Awards for TV.

In 2009, Valenciano released a collaborative album with Martin Nievera called As 1, with the carrier single of the same title.

In 2010, Valenciano was in a Holy Week drama special, Gulong ("Wheel"), a CBN Asia production shown on GMA.

For his 25th anniversary in 2008, STAR RECORDS, the music arm of ABS-CBN, released GV 25, a compilation of songs he composed and recorded sung by music stars of the Philippines like Sharon Cuneta, Rachel Ann Go, Martin Nievera, Piolo Pascual, Jed Madela, Erik Santos, and Christian Bautista.

For his 30th anniversary in 2013, his concert ARISE, which was originally staged at the Araneta Coliseum for two nights and restaged at the MOA ARENA to a jam-packed audience, won as PMPC's Best Concert of the Year. His album With You won the Best Inspirational Album for the same year at the Catholic Mass Media Awards.

=== Philanthropy ===
Valenciano formed the Shining Light Foundation in 1989, focusing on supporting diabetics and a scholarship program that has produced many multi-awarded scholars and students.

== Personal life ==
Valenciano married Maria Anna Elizabeth "Angeli" Pangilinan, the sister of senator Francis Pangilinan, on August 6, 1984. Together, they have three children: Paolo Valenciano, a director and the vocalist of the band Salamin; Gabriel Valenciano, a singer, keyboardist, dancer, and director; and Kiana Valenciano, a model and singer-songwriter. The family resides in Antipolo.

He is currently living with type 1 diabetes, and has been an endorser for several wellness products related to the condition. In May 2018, Valenciano started feeling ill after a performance with his son Gabriel for the celebration of his 35th anniversary in showbiz on ABS-CBN's Sunday afternoon show ASAP, and had to undergo open heart surgery due to blockage of his left anterior descending artery caused by his diabetes. The procedure was successfully performed on May 6, 2018, and he was released from the hospital by May 12.

On April 17, 2019, Valenciano's mother died in Orlando, Florida, after battling pneumonia, congestive heart failure, and H1N1 flu.

== Concerts ==
Valenciano dubbed as Philippines "Mr. Pure Energy" has performed over 100 concerts worldwide throughout his career in the music industry.

== Filmography ==
=== Film ===
Year	Film	Role	Notes	Source
1984	Hotshots	Mike Morales	Valenciano's first movie appearance	
1986	Horsey-horsey: Tigidig-tigidig	Tommy		
1986	Payaso		cameo appearance	
1987	Di bale na lang	Nelson	main role	
1987	Maria Went to Town	Fernando		
1988	Ibulong mo sa Diyos	Gilbert Tabuena	main role	
1988	Rock-a-Bye Baby	Mike Montemayor	main role	
1988	Natutulog Pa Ang Diyos	Mark Vilchez		
1990	Kung Tapos na ang Kailanman	Jeric Israel	main role	
1990	Papa's Girl	Raffy Moreno	main role	
1990	Pangako ng Puso	Jerry Cortez		
1991	Kaputol Ng Isang Awit	Johnny Abrigo	main role	
1995	Hataw na	Robbie Mohica	main role	
1996	SPO1 Don Juan: Da Dancing Policeman	Bicycle Cop	cameo appearance	
2005	Gary V: Music Video Collection	Himself	Valenciano's music video collection	
2007	The Bicycle (Gulong)	Tito Lito		
2011	Subject: I Love You	Choy	Based on the "I Love You" computer virus of 2000	
2012	I Do Bidoo Bidoo: Heto nAPO Sila!	Nick Fuentebella		

=== Television ===
Year	TV program	Role	Notes
1988, 1990, 1992	Ryan Ryan Musikahan	Himself	Guest Performer
1994	Maalaala Mo Kaya	Sendong	"Sandcastle" Season 3 episode 33
1995	CBN Asia Holy Week Special		
1996	Ikaw, Ako at Ang Awit	Adrian	GMA Telesine Specials
1997–2003	SOP	Himself	Main host/performer
2001–2002	Ikaw Lang ang Mamahalin	Ricky Lopez	cameo appearance
2003–present	ASAP	Himself	Main host/performer
2006	Sa Ngalan Ng Anak: A CBN Asia Holy Week Special		
2009	May Bukas Pa		Guest
2010	The X Factor Philippines		Judge
2010–present	It's Showtime	Himself	Magpasikat 2010 Head Judge TNT 1-6 Head Judge Magpasikat 2021 Head Judge
2010	Gulong: A CBN Asia Holy Week Special		
2010	Twist and Shout	Himself	Host
2011	Minsan Lang Kita Iibigin	Himself	Guest / Wedding singer
2012	Walang Hanggan	Himself	Guest / Wedding singer
2013	The Voice of the Philippines	Himself	trust adviser of Sarah Geronimo
2015	Your Face Sounds Familiar Season 1	Himself	Jury
2015	Your Face Sounds Familiar Season 2	Himself	Jury
2017	Your Face Sounds Familiar: Kids Season 1	Himself	Jury
2017	FPJ's Ang Probinsyano	Himself	Guest / Wedding Singer
2018	Your Face Sounds Familiar: Kids Season 2	Himself	Jury
2019	World of Dance Philippines	Himself	Judge
2021	Your Face Sounds Familiar Season 3	Himself	Jury
2022	Idol Philippines (season 2)	Himself	Judge
2025	Idol Kids Philippines	Himself	Judge
2025	Eat Bulaga!	Himself	Guest/Performer
2025–2026	Your Face Sounds Familiar Season 4	Himself	Jury

== Awards and nominations ==
=== Music ===
Year	Award giving body	Category	Nominated work	Results
1996	GMMSF Box-Office Entertainment Awards	Total Entertainer of the Year	—N/a	Won
1998	GMMSF Box-Office Entertainment Awards	Best Male Singer	—N/a	Won
2002	MTV Pilipinas Music Award	Favorite Male Video	"Can We Just Stop and Talk Awhile"	Won
2003	Aliw Awards	Best Male Concert Performer	"XXTREME"	Won
2004	17th Awit Awards	Best Performance by a Duet	"Sana Maulit Muli"(with Kyla)	Won
2006	19th Aliw Awards	Best Male Performer in a Major Concert	"Thankful"	Won
2006	19th Aliw Awards	Entertainer of the Year	—N/a	Won
2006	19th Aliw Awards	Hall of Fame	—N/a	Won
2007	20th Awit Awards	Best Performance by a Male Recording Artist	"In Another Lifetime"	Won
2007	MYX Music Awards	Favorite Male Artist	—N/a	Nominated
2007	MYX Music Awards	Favorite Mellow Video	"You Give Me Reason"	Nominated
2008	21st Awit Awards	Best Performance by a Male Recording Artist (Performance Award)	"Sana Maulit Muli"	Won
2008	21st Awit Awards	Best Performance by a Duet	"Hard Habit To Break" with Jed Madela	Won
2008	21st Awit Awards	Best Performance by a Male Recording Artist (People's Choice Award)	"Sana Maulit Muli"	Nominated
2009	22nd Awit Awards	Best Ballad Recording	"When I Hear You Call"	Won
2009	22nd Awit Awards	Best Collaboration	"Letting Go" with Powerplay feat. Mon Faustino	Won
2009	22nd Awit Awards	Best Performance by a Male Recording Artist	"When I Hear You Call"	Nominated
2009	22nd Awit Awards	Best Dance Recording	"Shout For Joy Gabriel Valenciano Mix)"	Nominated
2009	22nd Awit Awards	Best Inspirational/Religious Recording	"When I Hear You Call"	Nominated
2009	22nd Awit Awards	Best Musical Arrangement	"When I Hear You Call"	Nominated
2009	22nd Awit Awards	Music Video of the Year	"When I Hear You Call"	Nominated
2009	GMMSF Box-Office Entertainment Awards	Male Concert Performer of the Year	"Gary Live@25"	Won
2010	23rd Awit Awards	Best Ballad Recording	"Tayong Dalawa"	Won
2010	23rd Awit Awards	Best Performance by a Male Recording Artist	"How Can I"	Nominated
2010	23rd Awit Awards	Best Collaboration	"As 1" with Martin Nievera	Nominated
2010	23rd Awit Awards	Album of the Year	"As 1" with Martin Nievera	Nominated
2010	23rd Awit Awards	Best Rock/Alternative Recording	"AYT" with Sponge Cola	Nominated
2010	GMMSF Box-Office Entertainment Awards	Male Recording Artist of the Year	—N/a	Won
2011	24th Awit Awards	Best Performance by a Male Recording Artist	"Did It Ever" & "Kung Tayo'y Magkakalayo"	Nominated
2011	24th Awit Awards	Best Ballad Recording Artist	"Kung Tayo' Magkakalayo"	Nominated
2011	24th Awit Awards	Best Christmas Recording	"Ngayong Pasko Magniningning ang Pilipino" with Toni Gonzaga & University of Santo Tomas Singers	Nominated
2012	25th Awit Awards	Best Performance by a Male Recording Artist	"Minsan Lang Kita Iibigin"	Nominated
2013	26th Awit Awards	Best Performance by a Male Recording Artist	"Hanggang sa Dulo ng Walang Hanggan"	Won
2013	26th Awit Awards	Best Ballad Recording	"Hanggang sa Dulo ng Walang Hanggan"	Won
2013	26th Awit Awards	Best Performance by a Male Recording Artist	"In Your Eyes"	Nominated
2014	6th PMPC Star Awards for Music	Male Recording Artist of the Year	—N/a	Won
2014	6th PMPC Star Awards for Music	Concert of the Year	Arise 3.0	Won
2015	46th GMMSF Box-Office Entertainment Awards	Male Concert Performer of the Year	Arise 3.0	Won
2015	28th Awit Awards	Best Performance by a Male Recording Artist	"Saytay," "Kapalaran"	Nominated
2015	28th Awit Awards	Album of the Year	"With You"	Nominated
2015	28th Awit Awards	Best Inspirational/Religious Recording	"Ipagpatuloy Mo, Galing ng Pilipino"	Won
2015	28th Awit Awards	Best Dance Recording, Best Inspirational/Religious Recording	"Saytay"	Nominated
2015	28th Awit Awards	Best Song Written For Movie/TV/Stage Play	"Ipagpatuloy Mo, Galing ng Pilipino"	Won
2016	8th PMPC Star Awards for Music	Concert of the Year	"Gary V. Presents"	Nominated
2016	8th PMPC Star Awards for Music	Compilation Album of the Year	"GOLD"	Won
2017	8th Eduk Circle Awards	Most Influential Concert Performer	"Love in Motion"	Won
2017	8th Eduk Circle Awards	Best Male Music Artist	"Wag Ka Nang Umiyak"	Nominated
2018	9th PMPC Star Awards for Music	Levi Celerio Lifetime Achievement Award	(His overall contribution to OPM)	Won
2018	9th PMPC Star Awards for Music	Best Album Design Cover of the Year	"Gary V. @ Primetime"	Won
2018	9th PMPC Star Awards for Music	Compilation Album of the Year	"Gary V. @ Primetime"	Nominated
2018	9th PMPC Star Awards for Music	Concert of the Year	"Love in Motion"	Nominated
2019	10th PMPC Star Awards for Music	Male Recording Artist of the Year	"Ililigtas Ka Niya"	Nominated

=== Film and television ===
==== FAMAS ====
Year	Nominee / work	Award	Result
1988	Ibulong mo sa Diyos	Best Theme Song	Won
1995	Sana Maulit Muli	Best Theme Song	Won
2000		Dr. Ciriaco Santiago Memorial Award	Won
2006	"Ikaw Lamang" for the movie Dubai	Best Theme Song	Won

==== Golden Screen TV Awards ====
Year	Nominee / work	Award	Result
2006	Ikaw Lamang	Best Theme Song	Won
2011	ASAP Rocks	Outstanding Male Host in a Musical or Variety Program	Nominated
2013	I Do Bidoo Bidoo: Heto nAPO Sila!	Best Performance by an Actor in a Lead Role-Musical or Comedy	Nominated

=== Other accolades ===
- First artist in the world to have a Sennheiser Special Edition microphone named after him – Sennheiser Evolution Series 2001
- First and current UNICEF National Ambassador of Goodwill in the Philippines, 1998–present
- Stargate People Asia 2024 Men Who Matter - Legacy Awardee
