= Espiridion Laxa =

Filipino lawyer and film producer (1929–2009)

Espiridion Dising Laxa (December 18, 1929 – September 15, 2009) was a Filipino lawyer and film producer. He founded Tagalog Ilang-Ilang Productions & EDL Productions and served as an official for several film festivals and associations.

== Career ==
Laxa was a lawyer who was a senior partner at Laxa, Mapile & Associates. In the film world he served as an official for the Metro Manila Film Festival, the Philippine Motion Picture Producer Association, the Film Academy of the Philippines, and the Motion Picture Anti-Film Piracy Council Inc.

== Filmography ==
This 2 movie productions was distributed and uploaded by OctoArts Films, streaming at YouTube.

=== Tagalog Ilang-Ilang Productions (TIIP) ===
- Baril sa baril (1961) Fernando Poe Jr., Joseph Estrada, Perla Bautista, Isabelle Lopez.
- Tondo Boy (1962) starred Joseph Estrada, Melinda Molina, Max Alvarado, Vicente Liwanag.
- Hari ng mga maton (1962) Joseph Estrada with a full cast
- Markang rehas (1962) starred Joseph Estrada and Perla Bautista
- Patapon (1963) starred Joseph Estrada, Jess Lapid, Perla Bautista, etc.
- Basagulero (1963) Max Alvarado, Joseph Estrada, Menchu Morelli.
- Isputnik vs. Darna (1963) starred Nida Blanca, Tony Ferrer, Liza Morena, etc.
- Kung hindi ka susuko...! (1963) starred Fernando Poe Jr., Joseph Estrada, Max Alvarado
- Fandong Asintado (1963) starred Fernando Poe Jr.
- Limang Kidlat (1963) starred Fernando Poe Jr., Romeo Vasquez, Jose Romulo, Tony Ferrer, & Bob Soler
- Pambato (1964) starred Joseph Estrada and a full cast
- Sa kamay ng mga kilabot (1965) starred Joseph Estrada, Larry Silva, etc.
- Labanang lalake! (1965) starred Joseph Estrada, Jess Lapid, Perla Bautista, etc.
- The Crimebuster (1968) starred Tony Ferrer, Eddie Garcia, Gina Laforteza, etc.
- The Blackbelter (1968) starred Tony Ferrer, Eddie Garcia, Gina Laforteza, etc.
- Raton Ariel (1968) starred Anna Gonzales, Jess Lapid, Steve Alcarado, etc.
- Masters of Karate (1968) starred Victor Bravo, Tony Ferrer, Gina Laforteza
- Karate Fighters (1968) starred Tony Ferrer, Victor Bravo, Daisy Romualdez
- Bigat ng kamay (1968) No available information
- Armalite Commandos (1968) No available information
- Don't Ever Say Goodbye (1972) starred Vilma Santos & Edgar Mortiz
- Mr. Lonely (1972) starred Victor Wood & Amapola (Maria Cabase)
- Kampanerang kuba (1973) starred Vilma Santos, Edgar Mortiz, etc.
- You Are My Destiny (1973) starred Victor Wood & Amapola (Maria Cabase)
- King Khayam and I (1974) starred Joseph Estrada, Vilma Santos, etc.
- Darna and the Giants (1974) starred Vilma Santos, Divina Valencia, etc.
- Darna vs. the Planet Women (1975) starred Vilma Santos & Zandro Zamora
- Chicks (1980) starred Rio Locsin, Lorna Tolentino, & Amy Austria
- Mabuting Kaibigan, Masamang Kaaway (1991) starred Fernando Poe Jr. & Vic Vargas

=== EDL Productions ===
- Muslim .357 (1986) starred Fernando Poe Jr.
- Ibigay Mo Sa Akin Ang Bukas (1987) starred Vilma Santos, Gabby Concepcion, & Richard Gomez
- Patapon (1993) starred Ronnie Ricketts, Cristina Gonzales, & Mariz Ricketts
- Pambato (1993) starred Ronnie Ricketts & John Regala
- Matinik Ng Kalaban (1995) Ronnie Ricketts
- Adan Lazaro (1996) starred Roi Vinzon
- Tapatan Ng Tapatan (1996) starred Lito Lapid & Dante Varona
- Bagsik Ng Kamao (1997) starred Edu Manzano & Luisito Espinosa
- Alipin Ng Aliw (1998) starred Liz Alindogan
- Ang Maton At Ang Showgirl (1998) starred Rita Magdalena & Michael Rivero
- Droga, Pagtatapat Ng Mga Babaeng Addict (1999) starred Rita Magdalena
- Talahib At Rosas 2 (1999) starred Joko Diaz & Maricel Morales
- Batang .45 (1999) starred Michael Rivero
- Ang Boyfriend Kong Pari (1999) starred Ronnie Ricketts & Vina Morales
- Antonio Cuervo - Police: Walang Pinipili Ang Batas (2000) starred Roi Vinzon
- Lakas At Pag-Ibig (2001) starred Daisy Reyes & Leo Rabago
- Kapag Buhay Ang Inutang... Buhay Din Ang Kabayaran (2001) starred Joko Diaz

== Awards/citations ==
- Lifetime Achievement Award (Film Academy of the Philippines)
- Dr. Ciriaco Santiago Memorial Award (FAMAS)
- Manila's 1993 Awardee (Patnubay ng Sining at Kalinangan)
- Flavio Macaso Memorial Award (FAMAS)

== Death ==
Espiridion Laxa died on September 15, 2009, of cardiac arrest related to prostate cancer. He was 79 years old.
