= Over October =

Filipino alternative rock band

- Origin: Manila, Philippines
- Genres: Indie pop; Alternative rock; pop rock
- Years active: 2014–present
- Labels: Red Ninja Production; MCA/UMG Philippines (Island Records); Underdog Music PH
- Members: Josh Buizon; Joshua Caleb Lua; Joric Canlas
- Past members: Anton Rodriguez; Janessa Geronimo
- Website: overoctober.com

Over October is a Filipino indie/alternative rock band based in Manila, Philippines. Formed in October 2014, it is composed of Josh Buizon on lead vocals and rhythm guitars, Joshua Caleb Lua on lead guitars, and Joric Canlas on bass. The band has been released its debut EP Free in 2016, followed by two singles "Never Stop" in 2017 and "Wait" in 2018. The band gained exposure when their latest single "Ikot" became a hit in 2024.

== History ==
The band was formed in 2014 when it was started out as a college band representing for the Ateneo Musicians Pool. The band was later signed with independent label Red Ninja Production and released their debut EP Free in 2016.

In 2019, the band officially joined MCA Music and released its debut full-length album Press Play with their lead single "Alive". In 2021, the band released its second EP Maybe Today, Maybe Tomorrow.

Since 2023, the band has been signed with Underdog Music PH. On April 12, 2024, the band released its new single "Ikot". The song was later made unto the Billboard Philippines Hot 100. Following the success of "Ikot", the band has released another single "Kaakit-akit"; as well as their first major solo concert at the Music Museum in October 2024.

On July 2026, Janessa Geronimo has announced her departure from the band after 12 years. The band is set for another concert on October 4, 2026 at the New Frontier Theater as Geronimo making her final appearance with the band.

== Musical influences ==
The band heavily inspires the musical styling of John Mayer, Jason Mraz, Coldplay, and Hillsong.

== Band members ==
=== Current members ===
- Josh Buizon – lead vocals and rhythm guitars
- Joshua Caleb Lua – lead guitars
- Joric Canlas – bass

=== Former members ===
- Anton Rodriguez – guitars (until 2026)
- Janessa Geronimo – drums

== Discography ==
=== Albums ===
- Press Play (2019)
- Make Believe (2024)

=== EPs ===
- Free (2016)
- Maybe Today, Maybe Tomorrow (2021)

=== Singles ===
- "Never Stop"
- "Wait"
- "Alive"
- "Mr. Sun"
- "Sandali Lang"
- "Intertwine" (with The Ridleys)
- "Ikot"
- "Kaakit-akit"
- "Lumayo"

=== Collaborations ===
List of collaboration singles, showing associated albums
| Title | Year | Album | Ref. |
|---|---|---|---|
| "Tulad ng Dati" (Coke Studio PH) (with Ena Mori) | 2025 | Non-album single | |
| "Moved on Last" (with Angela Ken) | 2026 | Non-album single | |
| "The Weather" (with Fly By Midnight) | 2026 | Non-album single | |
| Where Dreams Fly (Cebu Pacific 30th anniversary theme) | 2026 | Non-album single | |

== Awards and nominations ==
| Award | Year | Category | Recipient(s) | Result | Ref. |
|---|---|---|---|---|---|
| New Hue Video Music Awards | 2025 | Indie Artist of the Year | Over October | Won | |
