= Gab Pangilinan =

Filipino actress and singer (born 1991)

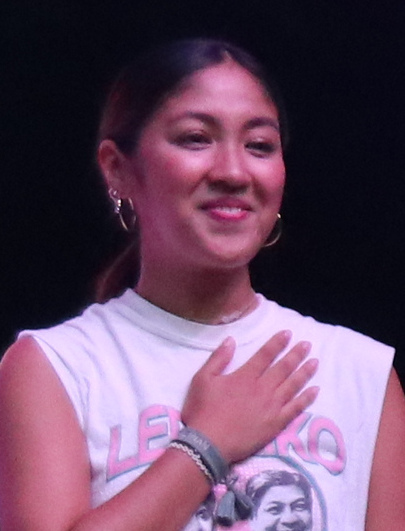
- Pangilinan in 2022
- Born: Gabriela Noelle Sevilla Pangilinan; November 22, 1991 (age 34)
- Other names: Gabriela Pangilinan; Gab Pangilinan-Salomon
- Education: Ateneo de Manila University (AB)
- Occupations: Actress; singer; producer
- Years active: 2014–present
- Spouse: Myke Salomon (m. 2023)
- Relatives: Kiko Pangilinan (uncle); Anthony Pangilinan (uncle); Sharon Cuneta (aunt); Maricel Laxa (aunt); Gary Valenciano (uncle); Paolo Valenciano (cousin); Gab Valenciano (cousin); Kiana Valenciano (cousin); Donny Pangilinan (cousin); Josh Buizon (cousin); Kakie (cousin)
- Musical career
- Origin: Quezon City, Metro Manila
- Genres: Broadway; pop; jazz; classical
- Instrument: Vocals

Gabriela Noelle Sevilla Pangilinan-Salomon (born November 22, 1991) is a Filipino actress and singer known for her work in musical theater, having starred in the Metro Manila productions of Rak of Aegis (2014), Grease (2014), Side Show (2018), Mula sa Buwan (2018, 2022), Beautiful: The Carole King Musical (2019), Ang Huling El Bimbo (2019, 2023), The Last Five Years (2023), Pingkian: Isang Musikal (2024), and Jesus Christ Superstar (2026). She has also worked on screen, including in the musical web series Still (2021). In music, she was a featured vocalist on the song "Rosas" (2022).

Pangilinan has received recognition from Philippine and regional award-giving bodies, including as a recipient of an Asian Television Award for Still and an Awit Award for "Rosas", and as a three-time Gawad Buhay nominee for Mula sa Buwan, The Last Five Years, and Pingkian: Isang Musikal.

== Early life and education ==
Gabriela Noelle Sevilla Pangilinan was born on November 22, 1991, to dentist Vicky Sevilla and businessman Joseph Pangilinan, brother of Senator Kiko Pangilinan and media personality Anthony Pangilinan. Gab has a younger sister, Kara, who is also an actress. Both their parents were singers; Vicky was a member of the Kuh Ledesma-led band Music and Magic, while Joseph was a member of the Kundirana. Gab's paternal grandmother, Emma Nepomuceno, was a coloratura soprano and a theater actress.

Pangilinan began formal theater training at age 7 through a summer workshop for children, which she attended for six consecutive years. Her parents allowed her to pursue theater but treated it as an extracurricular activity rather than a career path. They prioritized her formal education and preferred that she pursue what they considered a "practical" profession. Pangilinan received her first paycheck as a performer at around 10 years old. At 11, teachers encouraged her to move up to a more advanced class. At 12 years old, she decided she wanted to study at the Ateneo de Manila University in Quezon City so she could join its musical theater organization, Ateneo Blue Repertory. At 15, Pangilinan joined her first production as part of the ensemble of High School Musical.

She attended the Ateneo de Manila for tertiary education where she joined Ateneo Blue Repertory. While in college, she interned at Atlantis Theatrical under the supervision of theater directors Bobby Garcia and Chari Arespacochaga. In 2013, Pangilinan graduated from the university with a Bachelor of Arts degree in communication. After graduating, she worked as a foreign exchange spot broker.

== Career ==
=== Stage ===
Pangilinan began her professional theater career in 2014, making her acting debut as an ensemble member in Rak of Aegis, a musical based on Aegis's songs that was produced by the Philippine Educational Theater Association (PETA). Two months into the production, she resigned from her corporate job and decided to fully pursue theater. Later that year, Pangilinan joined the Manila rerun of Grease by 9 Works Theatrical at Carlos P. Romulo Auditorium, RCBC Plaza, Makati, where she played Cha-Cha DiGregorio alongside leads Guji Lorenzana and Tippy Dos Santos as Danny Zuko and Sandy Dumbrowski, respectively. Over the following decade, she built a career largely centered on musical theater, with roles and engagements described by Philippine arts institutions and theater organizations as spanning ensemble, supporting, and leading work across major Metro Manila-based companies.

In 2015, Pangilinan played Annie in the music-driven romantic thriller F(r)iction, starring Red Concepcion and Myke Salomon, staged at the De La Salle–College of Saint Benilde in Manila. F(r)iction was directed by Toff de Venecia, based on a book by Bym Buhain and Miyo Sta. Maria, with Ejay Yatco composing the music and writing the lyrics. In 2016, Pangilinan starred as Chelsea in PETA's dystopian-themed musical 3 Stars and a Sun, based on the songs of Francis Magalona. She alternated the role with Anj Heruela. A few months later, Pangilinan appeared as the spirit Ariel in Nona Shepphard and Liza Magtoto's reimagining of William Shakespeare's The Tempest, a PETA production developed with partners including the British Council and the Japan Foundation and set in a Philippine context informed by survivor accounts from Super Typhoon Yolanda (Haiyan). She was also among the credited cast of MusicArtes's production of Godspell, in a staging directed by Anton Juan, with performances reported at Carlos P. Romulo Auditorium in June 2016.

In 2018, Pangilinan was cast as conjoined twin Daisy Hilton alongside Kayla Rivera's Violet Hilton in Side Show staged by Atlantis Theatrical Entertainment Group, with performances at RCBC Plaza. Later that year, she was listed among cast members for Rak of Aegis' sixth and final run.

She appeared in Atlantis Theatrical's Manila staging of Beautiful: The Carole King Musical as the lead singer of the Shirelles and as Marilyn Wald, which ran from June 14 to July 7, 2019, at Meralco Theater in Pasig. That same year, Pangilinan began portraying a young Joy in the jukebox musical Ang Huling El Bimbo, alternating the role with Tanya Manalang. The musical, which was based on the music of Eraserheads, concluded a final run at the Newport Performing Arts Theater in Pasay in July 2023. Pangilinan also played Roxane in Mula sa Buwan (From the Moon), a musical adaptation of Edmond Rostand's 1897 play Cyrano de Bergerac. She reprised the role during the production's 2022 return, which was staged at the Samsung Performing Arts Theater in Circuit Makati and followed earlier runs staged at the Areté of her alma mater, Ateneo de Manila University, in 2018.

Atlantis Theatrical Entertainment Group announced in February 2020 that Pangilinan would portray Cuban-American singer Gloria Estefan in its Manila staging of On Your Feet!, a jukebox musical based on the life and music of Gloria and Emilio Estefan. Gloria herself approved Pangilinan's casting after viewing her audition videos, which were sent to Estefan by director Bobby Garcia. The production was scheduled to run from November 13 to December 6, 2020, at the Circuit Performing Arts Theater in Circuit Makati.

During the same period, Pangilinan was cast in other major Metro Manila productions. She played Marela in Repertory Philippines's staging of Anna in the Tropics, which was scheduled to open on March 13, 2020, but was canceled before opening after Metro Manila entered community quarantine related to the COVID-19 pandemic. She was also announced as an alternate for Eds delos Santos in Tabing Ilog: The Musical at the Dolphy Theatre in Quezon City. Likewise, the performances were canceled as COVID-19 restrictions expanded in March 2020.

From September to October 2023, Pangilinan starred as struggling actress Cathy Hiatt opposite her husband Myke Salomon as rising novelist Jamie Wellerstein in Barefoot Theatre Collaborative's Manila staging of The Last Five Years at Power Mac Center Spotlight in Circuit Makati. In an interview with Theater Fans Manila, Pangilinan said she had been interested in performing the musical since early adolescence. The same interview described her and Salomon as serving as co-producers as part of the company's producing team.

Pangilinan starred in Tanghalang Pilipino's Pingkian: Isang Musikal (Flint: A Musical), which covers the life of Filipino general Emilio Jacinto and his involvement in the Philippine Revolution, in March 2024. She was cast in a dual role as Jacinto's wife, Catalina de Jesus, and the traitor Florencio Reyes. In October 2024, she played Desdemona in Company of Actors in Streamlined Theatre's version of William Shakespeare's Othello at Mirror Studio Theater in Makati.

In May 2025, Pangilinan appeared in Barefoot Theatre Collaborative's Philippine staging of We Aren't Kids Anymore at Power Mac Center Spotlight, described by GMA News Online as a coming-of-age song cycle by Drew Gasparini.

In February 2026, Philippine media reported that Pangilinan was cast as Mary Magdalene in the Manila engagement of the rock opera Jesus Christ Superstar, scheduled to run from May 2 to May 31, 2026, at The Theatre at Solaire in Parañaque, presented by GMG Productions with Crossroads Live and Work Light Productions.

On July 12, 2026, Barefoot Theatre Collaborative announced that Pangilinan will headline the Filipino original musical Gabriela: The Musical, set to open on November 13, 2026 at Hyundai Hall, Areté in Quezon City. She will play the title role of the Filipino revolutionary Gabriela Silang.

=== Screen ===
Pangilinan made her screen debut on the web series Forever Sucks (2016), released by D5 Studio, where she played Izabel's (Jasmine Curtis-Smith's) co-worker Nancy Jane. That same year, she appeared on the television series Till I Met You, which aired on ABS-CBN until 2017.

She later starred as Sab in the Viu original musical narrative series Still (2021), for which she won Best Leading Female Performance (Digital) at the 27th Asian Television Awards the following year.

Pangilinan also starred in the Star Cinema film My Lockdown Romance (2020) as the best friend of Jameson Blake's character.

=== Music ===
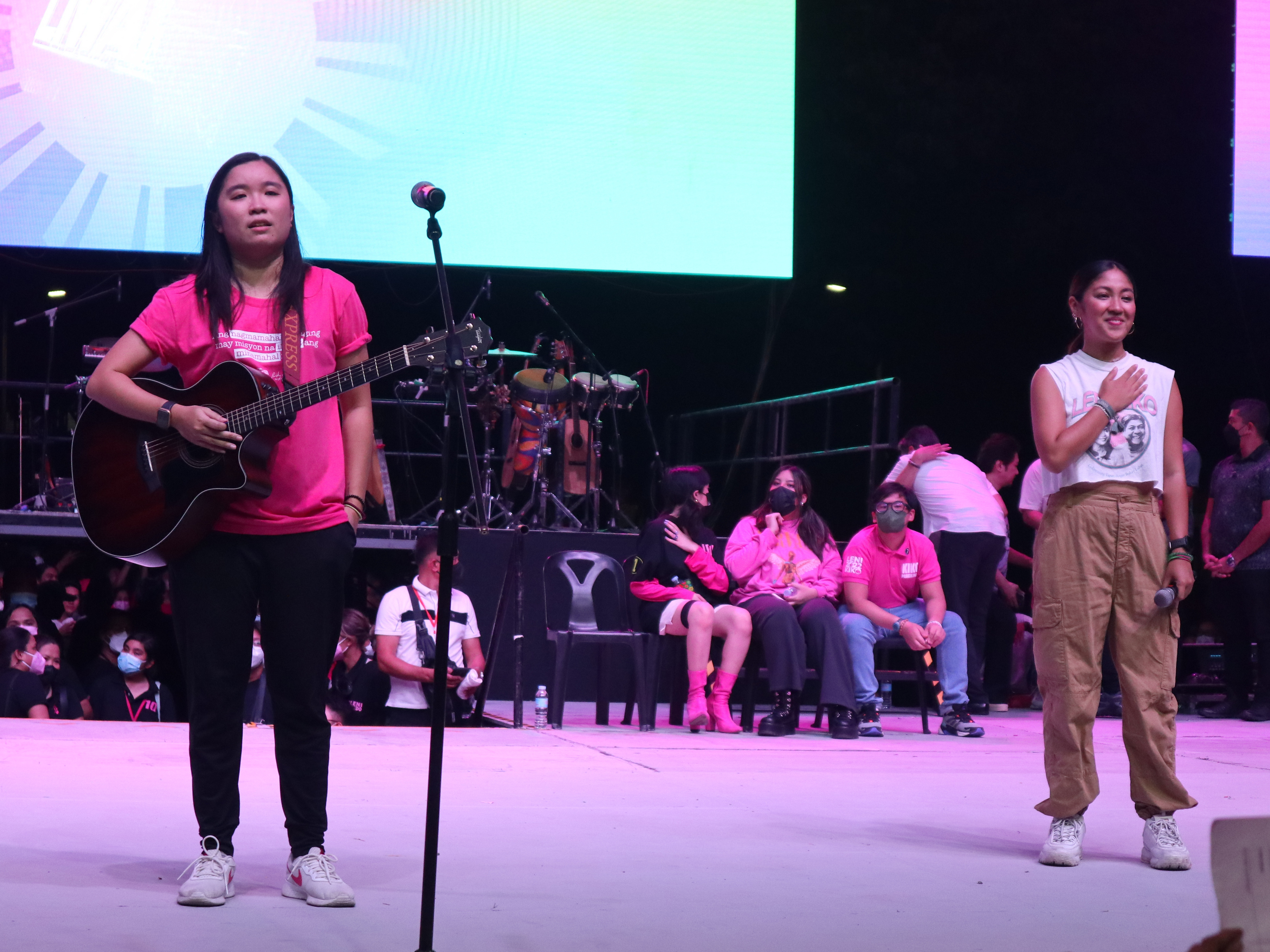
Pangilinan (right) performing "Rosas" with Nica del Rosario (left) at a post-election Team Robredo–Pangilinan gathering in 2022

In music, Pangilinan collaborated as the featured vocalist on "Rosas", a work by Filipino singer-songwriter Nica del Rosario for Leni Robredo's 2022 presidential campaign. Pangilinan's uncle, Kiko Pangilinan, was Robredo's running mate in the campaign. "Rosas" won the Best Collaboration award at the 36th Awit Awards in November 2023.

She was also among the performers in the 2023 remake of Jim Paredes's "Handog ng Pilipino sa Mundo" released on YouTube ahead of the People Power Revolution's 37th anniversary.

On February 14–15, 2025, Pangilinan headlined her first solo concert, Gab Pangilinan in Concert: This is Not a Musical, staged for two nights at the Globe Auditorium in Bonifacio Global City, Taguig.

== Artistry ==
Pangilinan has been described as a soprano.

== Personal life ==
Pangilinan began dating musical director and fellow actor Myke Salomon in 2016. They first met during the 2014 production of Rak of Aegis, in which they both starred and for which Salomon arranged the music. They have since worked together in other productions, including 3 Stars and a Sun (2016), Ang Huling El Bimbo (2019, 2023), Mula sa Buwan (2022), The Last Five Years (2023), and We Aren't Kids Anymore (2025). Immediately after the closing performance of Mula sa Buwan at the Samsung Performing Arts Theater in Circuit Makati on September 18, 2022, Salomon proposed to Pangilinan on stage, and they became engaged. They married on February 20, 2023, at Laiya Beach in San Juan, Batangas.

She stated in a 2023 interview that her favorite musicals were Once on This Island, The Last Five Years, and Wicked.

== Acting credits ==
=== Film ===
Year	Title	Role	Notes	Ref.
2020	My Lockdown Romance	Gad Cervantes		
2026	Edjop	Portia		

=== Television and digital series ===
Year	Title	Role	Notes	Ref.
2016	Forever Sucks	Nancy Jane	Web series	
2016–2017	Till I Met You			
2020	Love Me Hater	Marga Meneses	Miniseries	
2020	Bawal na Game Show	Herself	Contestant	
2021	Still	Sab	Miniseries	
2026	Born to Shine	young Charice		

=== Theater ===
Year	Title	Role	Notes	Ref.
2014	Rak of Aegis	Ensemble	PETA-PHINMA Theater, Quezon City	
2014	Once on This Island	Ti Moune	Ephesus Teatro, Makati	
2014	Grease	Cha-Cha DiGregorio	Carlos P. Romulo Auditorium, Makati	
2015	F(r)iction	Annie	De La Salle–College of Saint Benilde, Manila	
2016	3 Stars and a Sun	Chelsea	PETA-PHINMA Theater, Quezon City	
2016	The Tempest Reimagined	Ariel	PETA-PHINMA Theater, Quezon City	
2017	Dirty Old Musical	Ensemble	Music Museum, San Juan	
2017	Tagu-taguan, Nasaan Ang Buwan?	Princess Mina	PETA-PHINMA Theater, Quezon City	
2017	Godspell	Ensemble	Carlos P. Romulo Auditorium, Makati	
2018	Chitty Chitty Bang Bang	Ensemble	Newport Performing Arts Theater, Pasay	
2018	Rak of Aegis	Ensemble	PETA Theater Center, Quezon City	
2018	Side Show	Daisy Hilton	Carlos P. Romulo Auditorium, Makati	
2018	Mula sa Buwan	Roxane	Ateneo de Manila University, Quezon City	
2019	Ang Huling El Bimbo	Young Joy	Newport Performing Arts Theater, Pasay	
2019	Beautiful: The Carole King Musical	Shirelle / Marilyn Wald	Meralco Theater, Pasig	
2020	On Your Feet!	Gloria Estefan	Circuit Performing Arts Theater, Makati	
2022	Mula sa Buwan	Roxane	Samsung Performing Arts Theater, Makati	
2023	Ang Huling El Bimbo	Young Joy	Newport Performing Arts Theater, Pasay	
2023	The Last Five Years	Cathy Hiatt	Power Mac Center Spotlight, Makati	
2024	Pingkian: Isang Musikal	Catalina de Jesus / Florencio Reyes	CCP Black Box Theater, Pasay	
2024	Othello	Desdemona	Mirror Studio Theater, Makati	
2025	We Aren't Kids Anymore	Drew	Power Mac Center Spotlight, Makati	
2026	Jesus Christ Superstar	Mary Magdalene	The Theatre at Solaire, Parañaque	
2026	Gabriela: The Musical	Gabriela Silang	Ateneo de Manila University, Quezon City	

== Discography ==
=== Albums ===
Year	Title	Label	Notes	Ref.
2024	Mula sa Buwan (2022 Live Performance Recording)	O/C Records	Live album	

=== Singles ===
Year	Title	Notes	Ref.
2019	"Magasin" (originally by Eraserheads)	For the soundtrack of the musical Ang Huling El Bimbo; collaboration with David Ezra, Rafa Suguion-Reyna, Phi Palmos, Lance Reblando, Carla Guevara Laforteza, Myke Salomon, and Nicco Manalo	
2021	"Mundo Umikot Ka"	For the soundtrack of the miniseries Still; collaboration with Julie Anne San Jose, Lance Reblando, Mike Shimamoto, and Abe Autea	
2021	"Sumandali"	For the soundtrack of the miniseries Still; collaboration with Mike Shimamoto	
2022	"Rosas" (Nica del Rosario song)	Featured artist	
2023	"Handog ng Pilipino sa Mundo"	Collaboration with various artists	

== Awards and nominations ==
Pangilinan won Best Leading Female Performance (Digital) at the 27th Asian Television Awards for her role as Sab in Still (2021).

She received an Awit Award for Best Collaboration for "Rosas", credited as a collaboration with Nica del Rosario.

She is also a three-time nominee for the Gawad Buhay awards, with cited nominated stage performances including Pingkian: Isang Musikal (2024), The Last Five Years (2023), and Mula sa Buwan (2022).

== See also ==
- List of Filipino actresses
- List of Filipino singers
