= Circulo Verde =

Mixed-use development in the Philippines

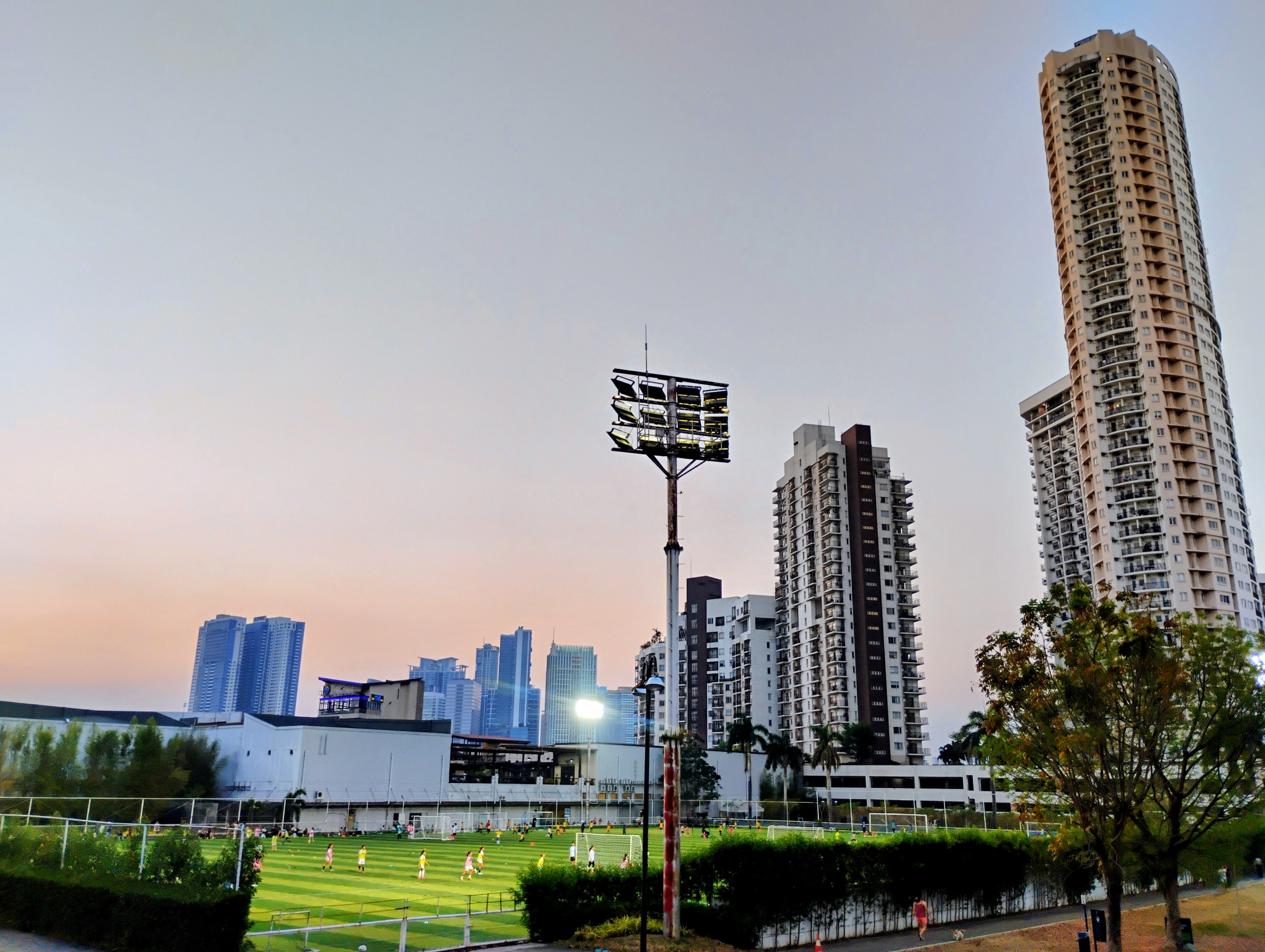
- Circulo Verde in 2026

Project
- Opening date: 2009
- Developer: Circulo Verde Development Corp.
- Owner: Ortigas & Company
- Website: Circulo Verde

Location
- Interactive map of Circulo Verde
- Coordinates: 14°36′4″N 121°5′20″E
- Country: Philippines
- Region: Metro Manila
- City: Quezon City
- Barangay: Bagumbayan
- Address: Calle Industria

Circulo Verde is a mixed-use development in Quezon City, Metro Manila, the Philippines. It is a primarily residential enclave on a meander of the Marikina River in the village of Bagumbayan on Quezon City's border with Pasig. The 12.47-hectare (30.8-acre) riverfront community is a redevelopment of the former cement plant owned by Concrete Aggregates Corp., a subsidiary of Ortigas & Company. It is one of the four major estates owned and developed by the company in Metro Manila, which in 2019 maintained a combined land bank of 50 hectares (120 acres) across the Eastern Manila cities of Mandaluyong, Pasig and Quezon City.

== Location ==
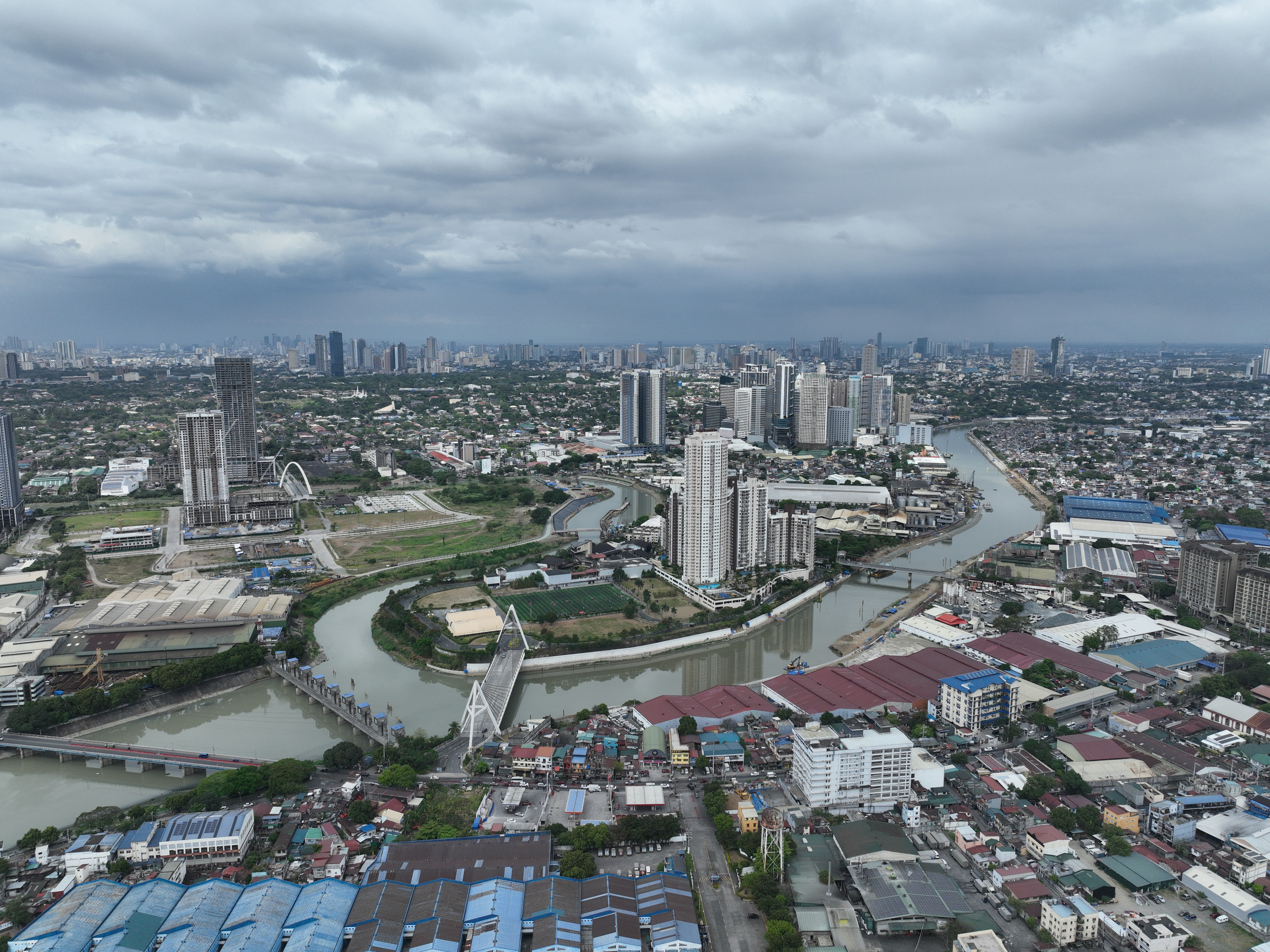
Circulo Verde (center) with surrounding areas

Circulo Verde is located along Calle Industria in the southeastern edge of Quezon City just south of the Eastwood City and Nuvo City developments. It is on the confluence of the Marikina River and the Manggahan Floodway surrounded on three sides by the river and the village of Manggahan, Pasig. The development is situated in a mainly industrial area, with a number of industrial plants such as those of Chemrez Technologies and Universal Robina along Industria. It is immediately north of the Rosario weir of the Manggahan Floodway and opposite the Parklinks development to the west. The development sits eight meters above the Marikina River.

== History ==
The area of Circulo Verde in Bagumbayan formed part of the 4,033-hectare (9,970-acre) friar estate known as Hacienda de Mandaloyon which Ortigas & Company founder Francisco Ortigas and Frank W. Dudley purchased from the Order of Saint Augustine in the 1920s. The agricultural estate spanned portions of what are now the cities of Mandaluyong, Pasig, San Juan and Quezon City, and also include the 100-hectare (250-acre) Ortigas Center, the 16-hectare (40-acre) Greenhills, the 18.5-hectare (46-acre) Ortigas East (former Frontera Verde), and the 10-hectare (25-acre) Capitol Commons, as well as the 10-hectare (25-acre) Camp Crame and the 30-hectare (74-acre) Camp Aguinaldo currently leased to the national government.

In February 2008, Ortigas & Company bought back the Bagumbayan plant of subsidiary Concrete Aggregates Corp. for ₱1.1 billion for redevelopment as a commercial and residential estate. The development, initially named Aqua Verde, was launched in March 2009 with 15 residential towers of staggered heights and a total of 4,000 condominium units announced as part of the ₱20 billion mixed-use project.

The development courted controversy in 2011 when local government officials of the surrounding cities and municipalities of Marikina, Pasig, Quezon City, Antipolo, Cainta, Rodriguez and San Mateo have accused the project's developer of encroaching on the Marikina River and constricting its flow when a river wall was being developed. The officials of the Typhoon Ketsana-hit areas expressed concern on the impact of the alleged reclamation when photographs of the river wall's construction were shared showing a supposed decrease in the river's width from 150 meters to just 50 meters. The project's engineer consultant, DCCD Engineering, denied the accusations and claimed that the riverbank protection wall actually improved the river's flow. The perimeter wall was also designed to avoid soil erosion that may be caused by the currents of the Marikina River running alongside the development. DCCD also claimed that the project was in full compliance with the Water Code of the Philippines explaining that the 16-meter easement in Circulo Verde was followed.

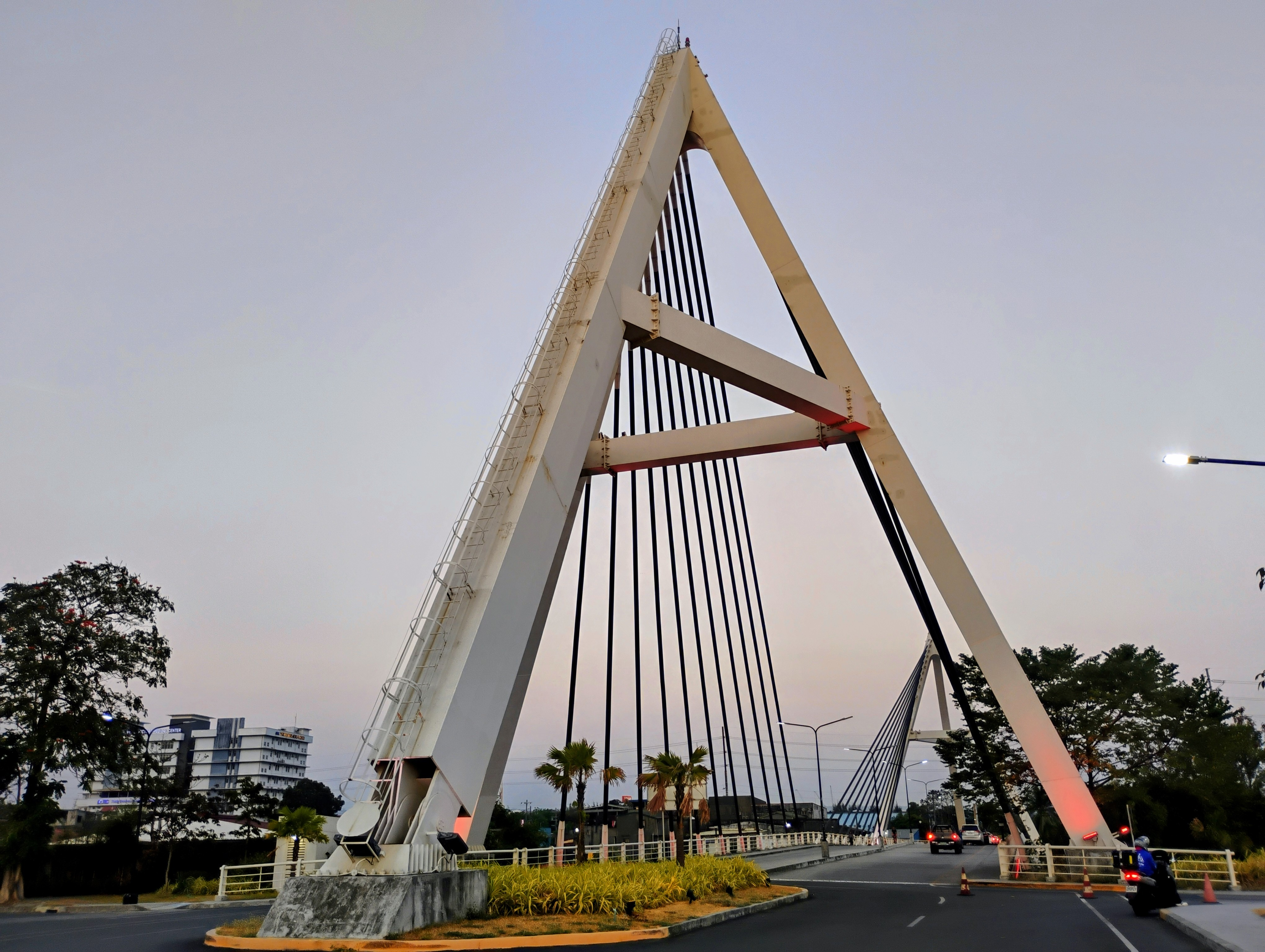
Circulo Verde Bridge

In April 2012, Ortigas & Company announced the construction of a 137-metre (449 ft) steel bridge over the Marikina River in partnership with the Pasig city government that will connect Calle Industria and the Circulo Verde perimeter road with Amang Rodriguez Avenue in Manggahan. It also announced that a 1.4-hectare (3.5-acre) central park and a stand-alone retail center will be constructed in the property. The company held the groundbreaking ceremony for the four-lane 19.2-metre (63 ft) wide bridge in June 2019 and announced a target completion date of H2 2020.

== Developments ==
Circulo Verde houses five high-rise condominium complexes, the Majorca, Ibiza, Seville, Lleida and Avila. It also contains a low-rise townhouse development called Circulo Verde Garden Homes. Other developments within the mixed-use community include:

- Bannister Academy
- CV Sports Hub, a multi-use recreational sports center. It consists of three facilities, namely The Bike Playground, CV Quad and Palms Arena. The Bike Playground is the first bike park in the Philippines which opened in March 2017. It features an asphalt pump track and has a 1-kilometer outdoor trail and a kids' track. The CV Quad is a convertible court for basketball, volleyball, badminton and futsal. Palms Arena is Circulo Verde's FIFA standard-sized football pitch.
- Hachi Park, a 365-square-metre (3,930 ft^{2}) dog park named after the famous Japanese Akita dog, Hachikō. The park is equipped with benches and dog stations including water vessels and rubbish bins, and is secured by a 1.2 meter-high fence. It opened in February 2014.
- Industria, the retail anchor for the Circulo Verde development which opened in October 2015. The ₱400 million lifestyle center has two levels with a total of 14,000 square metres (150,000 ft^{2}) of retail space. It houses a mix of cafes, restaurants and a co-working space.
- The Cirque, a 55-unit serviced apartment which opened in October 2017. It is managed by Hospitality Innovators Inc.

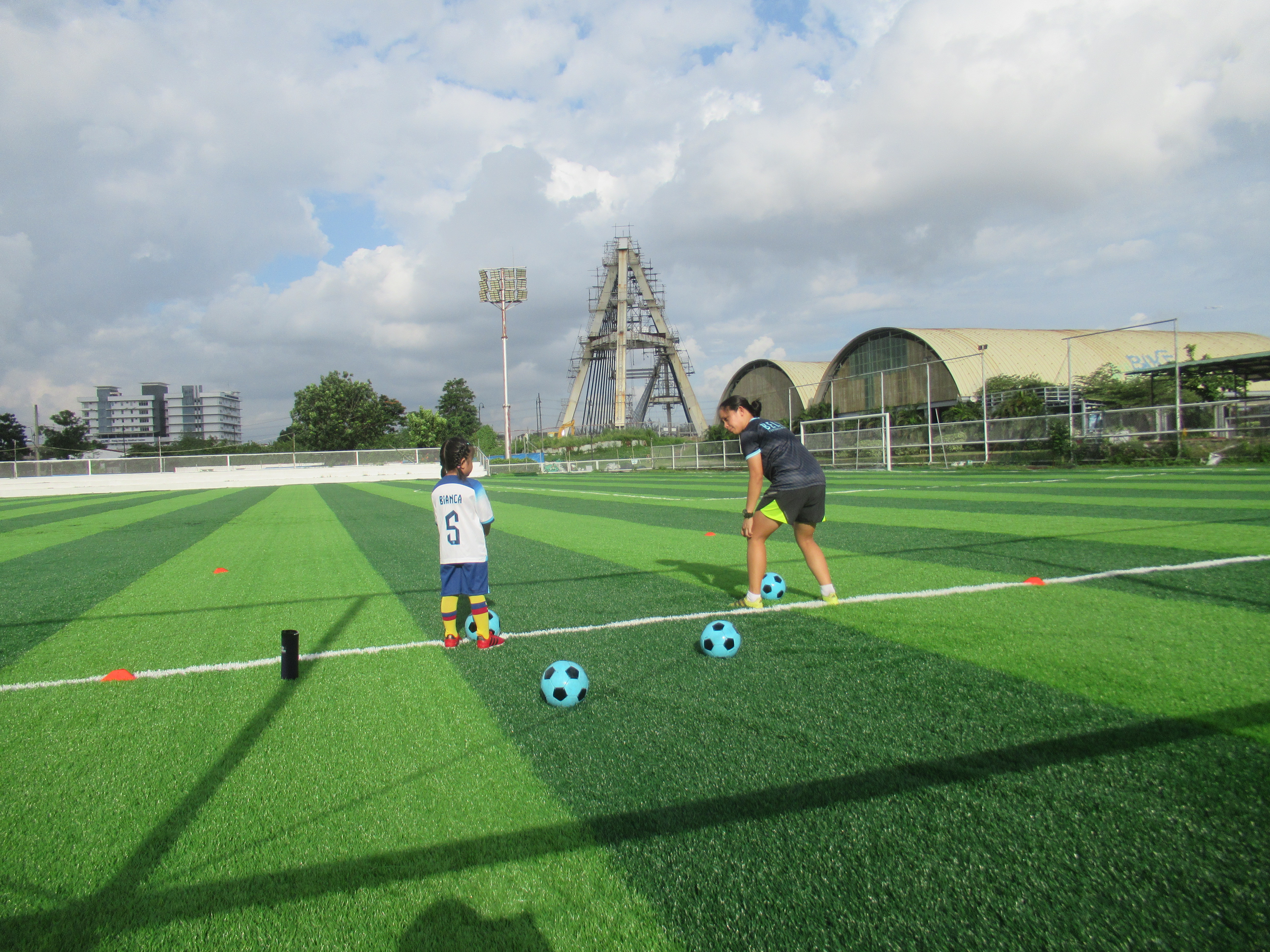
Football field

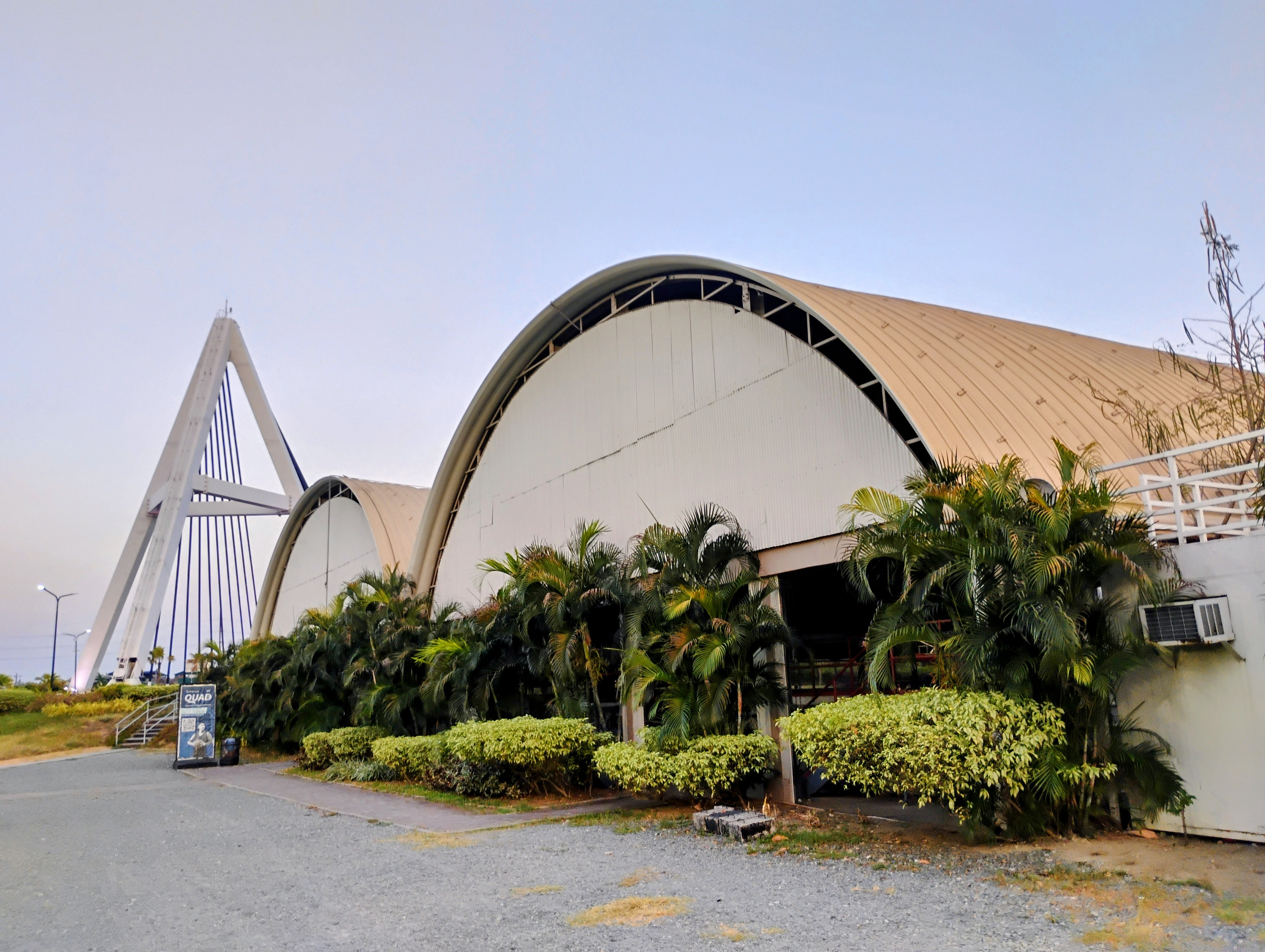
Basketball court
