= Sophia Laforteza =

Filipino and American singer (born 2002)

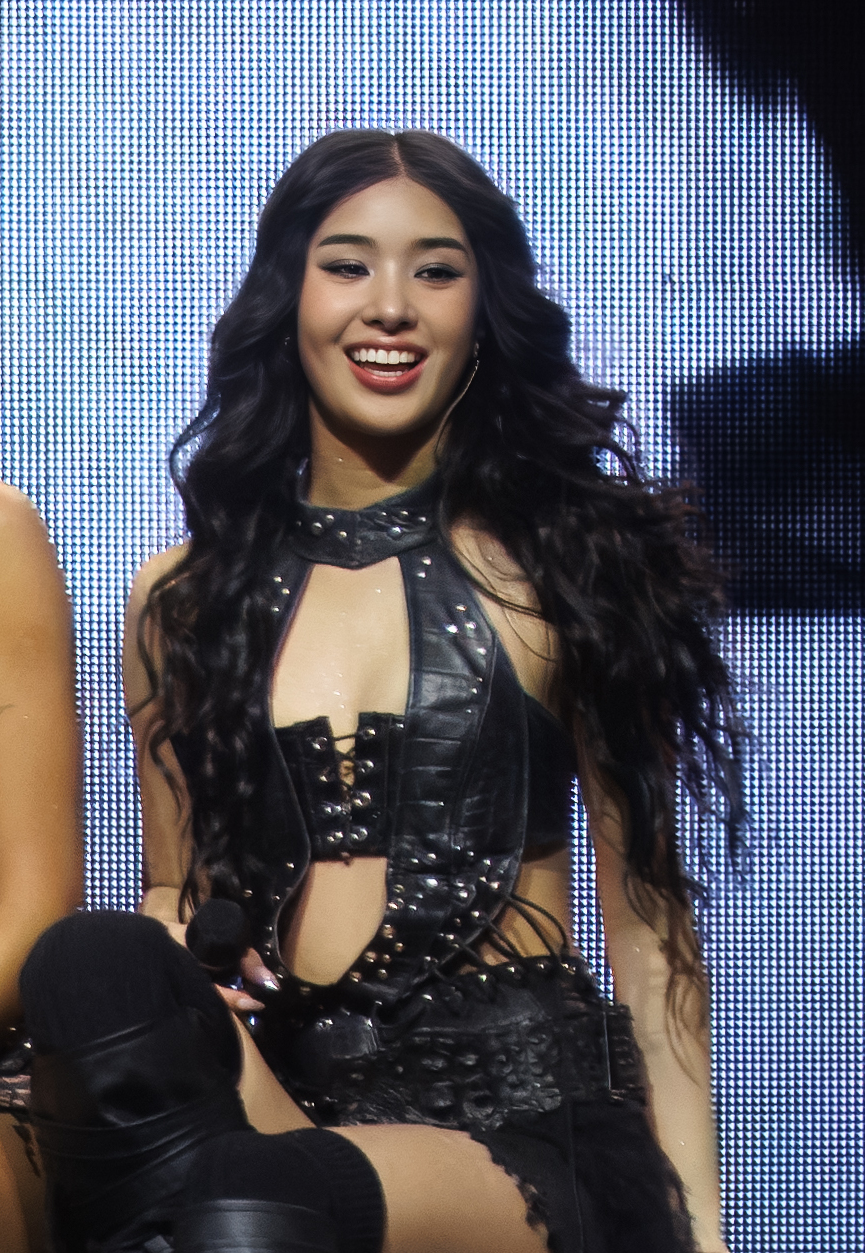
- Laforteza in 2025
- Born: Sophia Elizabeth Guevara Laforteza; December 31, 2002 (age 23); New York City, U.S.
- Citizenship: United States; Philippines
- Occupation: Singer
- Years active: 2008–present
- Mother: Carla Guevara Laforteza
- Musical career
- Genre: Pop
- Instrument: Vocals
- Years active: 2024–present
- Labels: Hybe UMG; Geffen
- Member of: Katseye

Sophia Elizabeth Guevara Laforteza (born December 31, 2002) is a Filipino and American singer. In 2024, she made her debut as the leader of the girl group Katseye, formed through the 2023 reality show Dream Academy created by Hybe and Geffen Records.

== Early life ==
Sophia Elizabeth Guevara Laforteza was born on December 31, 2002, at the Jamaica Hospital Medical Center in the Jamaica neighborhood in Queens, New York, and grew up in Manila, Philippines. Her mother, Carla Guevara Laforteza, is a musical theater actress and singer, while her father, Godfrey Laforteza, is an executive chef at Newport World Resorts. Laforteza has an older brother and a younger sibling, and is fluent in Tagalog and English. Laforteza is clinically diagnosed with attention deficit hyperactivity disorder. She receives psychiatric help and therapy for the condition.

Laforteza has been singing since she was three years old. At age five, she took several classes in ballet, jazz, musical theater, hip hop, and tap dancing. She graduated with the highest academic honors from Multiple Intelligence International School in Quezon City in June 2021.

== Career ==
=== Beginnings ===
At the age of five, Laforteza appeared on the Philippine talk show She Said, She Said with her mother. The two sang together on the program. In May 2022, she competed on the Philippine game show Family Feud. Before debuting with Katseye, she collaborated with Filipino singer Angia Laurel on a cover of Audrey Mika's "Y U Gotta Be Like That", which was uploaded on YouTube.

=== 2023–present: Dream Academy, debut with Katseye, and hiatus ===
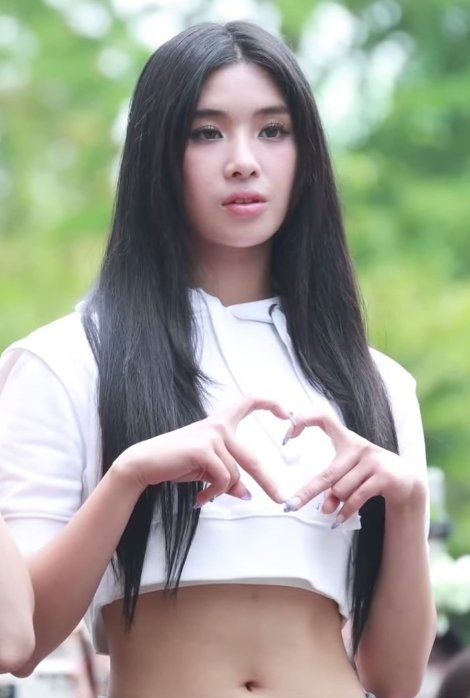
Laforteza in 2024

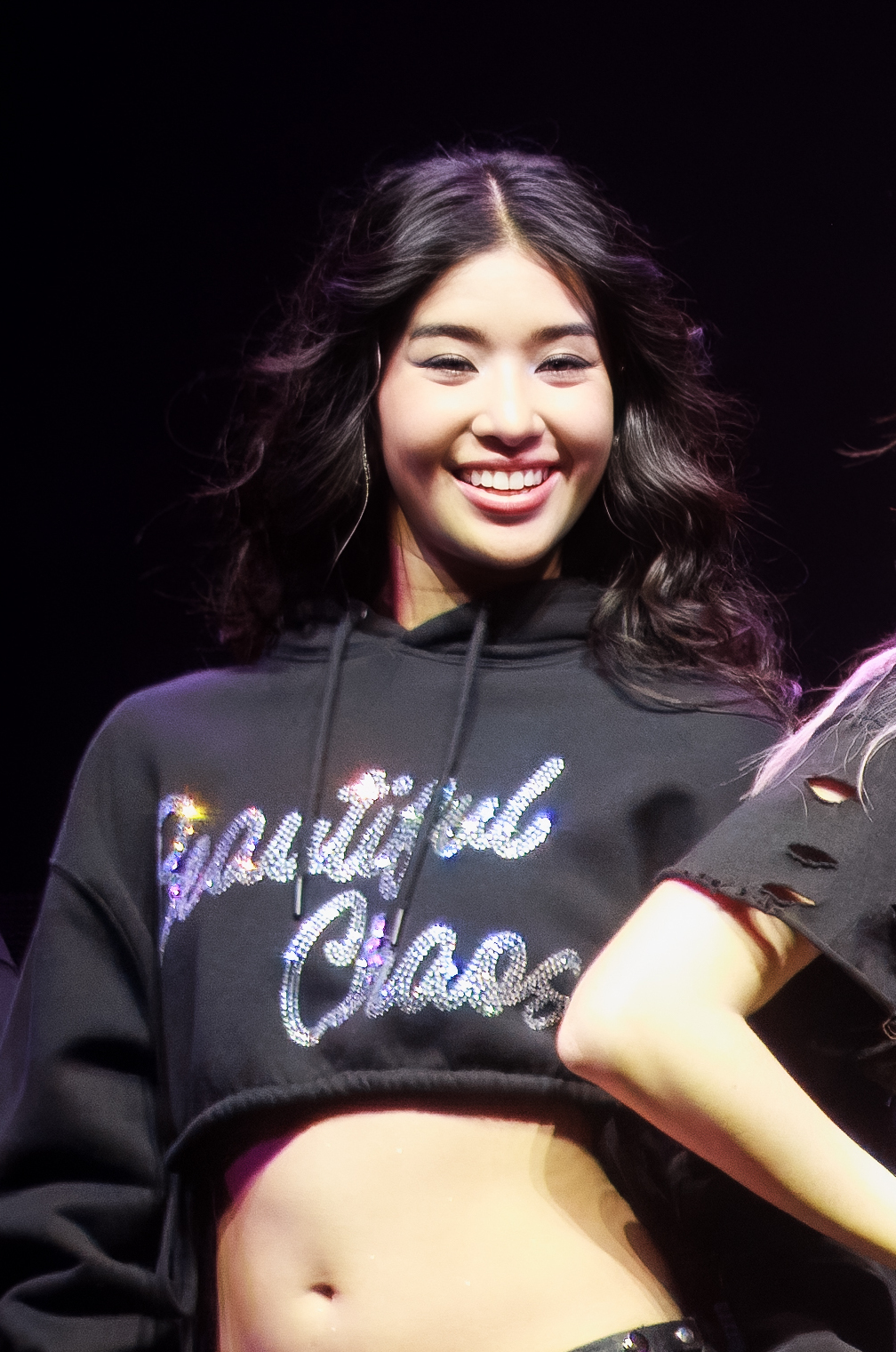
Laforteza in 2025

From August 19 to November 17, 2023, Laforteza represented the Philippines on the American reality television show Dream Academy, created in collaboration with Hybe and Geffen Records to determine the members of a described "global" girl group. Laforteza was selected from over 120,000 applicants worldwide to be one of the twenty finalists on the show. Throughout the competition, Laforteza consistently ranked high in the fan voting missions. At the live finale on November 17, 2023, she was announced as the first member of the group (later named Katseye) and was also designated as the group's leader. As a member of Katseye, Laforteza became the first Filipino artist to sign with a Hybe label. She received public support from Filipino fans and expressed gratitude, thanking them for helping make her "dream come true".

On June 19, 2026, it was announced that Laforteza had joined the soundtrack for the DreamWorks Animation film, Forgotten Island, performing a cover of INXS’ “Never Tear Us Apart”. It was later revealed that Laforteza would also have a cameo in the film.

On August 7, 2026, after being absent for two festival performances, it was announced that Laforteza was set to go on a temporary hiatus for her "personal health and wellness", writing to fans that "Making this decision wasn't easy, but I'm learning that health has to come first." On August 30, Hybe and Geffen Records revealed that Laforteza was not going to be participating during the European leg of The Wildworld Tour. Laforteza also gave a statement, saying "I have to remind myself every day that our health and mental well-being should always be prioritized; you can't pour from an empty cup."

On October 8, it was announced that Laforteza would resume group activities in January 2027 and miss the rest of The Wildworld Tour. Carla Guevara-Laforteza, Sophia's mom, also confirmed in late October during an interview for ABS-CBN News that Sophia has started training again.

== Media image ==
Laforteza has been lauded for representing Filipinos internationally and embracing her identity. She has been described as a "beacon" and someone who shares pride in her heritage. She is also noted to share many close friendships and online collaborations with fellow Filipino artists. In 2025, she expressed support for anti-corruption protests in the Philippines. The solidarity was described as Laforteza using her global spotlight to help amplify the movement.

Her makeup and beauty routines, particularly the styling of her lips, have received positive attention within the cosmetics sphere, sparking curiosity and coverage on how to replicate them.

Laforteza's bond with her family has also gained media attention. In 2025, the Filipino magazine Mega published an article interviewing the mothers of the Philippines' "most influential" women, including the mothers of Laforteza, Kathryn Bernardo, and Michelle Dee. In September, Nylon Manila's Rafael Bautista called Laforteza's relationship with her parents "goals". In October, Laforteza's mother, theater actress Carla Guevara Laforteza, told The Philippine Star's Dolly Anne Carvajal, "I don't mind being called 'the mom of Sophia Laforteza.'" She added that she introduces herself simply as Sophia Laforteza's mother in some interviews.

== Discography ==
As a contestant of Dream Academy, Laforteza participated in the promotional release of the contestants' shared songs for competition. They were performed on November 17, 2023, and released to streaming platforms on August 21, 2024.

=== As lead artist ===
Title	Year	Album
"Dirty Water" (as part of The Debut: Dream Academy)	2024	The Debut: Dream Academy - Live Finale
"All The Same" (as part of The Debut: Dream Academy)	2024	The Debut: Dream Academy - Live Finale
"Never Tear Us Apart"	2026	Forgotten Island (Original Motion Picture Soundtrack)

== Filmography ==
=== Film ===
Year	Title	Role	Notes	Ref.
2026	Forgotten Island	Not credited	Voice	

=== Television programs ===
Year	Title	Role	Ref.
2008	She Said, She Said	Herself	
2022	Family Feud	Herself	
2023	Dream Academy	Herself	
2024	Pop Star Academy: Katseye	Herself	

== Accolades ==
=== State honors ===
List of state honors, showing countries of origin, years given, names of organizations, and names of honors
Country	Year	Organization	Honor	Ref.
Philippines	2026	House of Representatives	House Resolution No. 951 (Note: A resolution to commend Sophia Laforteza for her historic performance on Coachella 2026.)	
