= Parklinks =

Mixed-use development in Metro Manila, Philippines

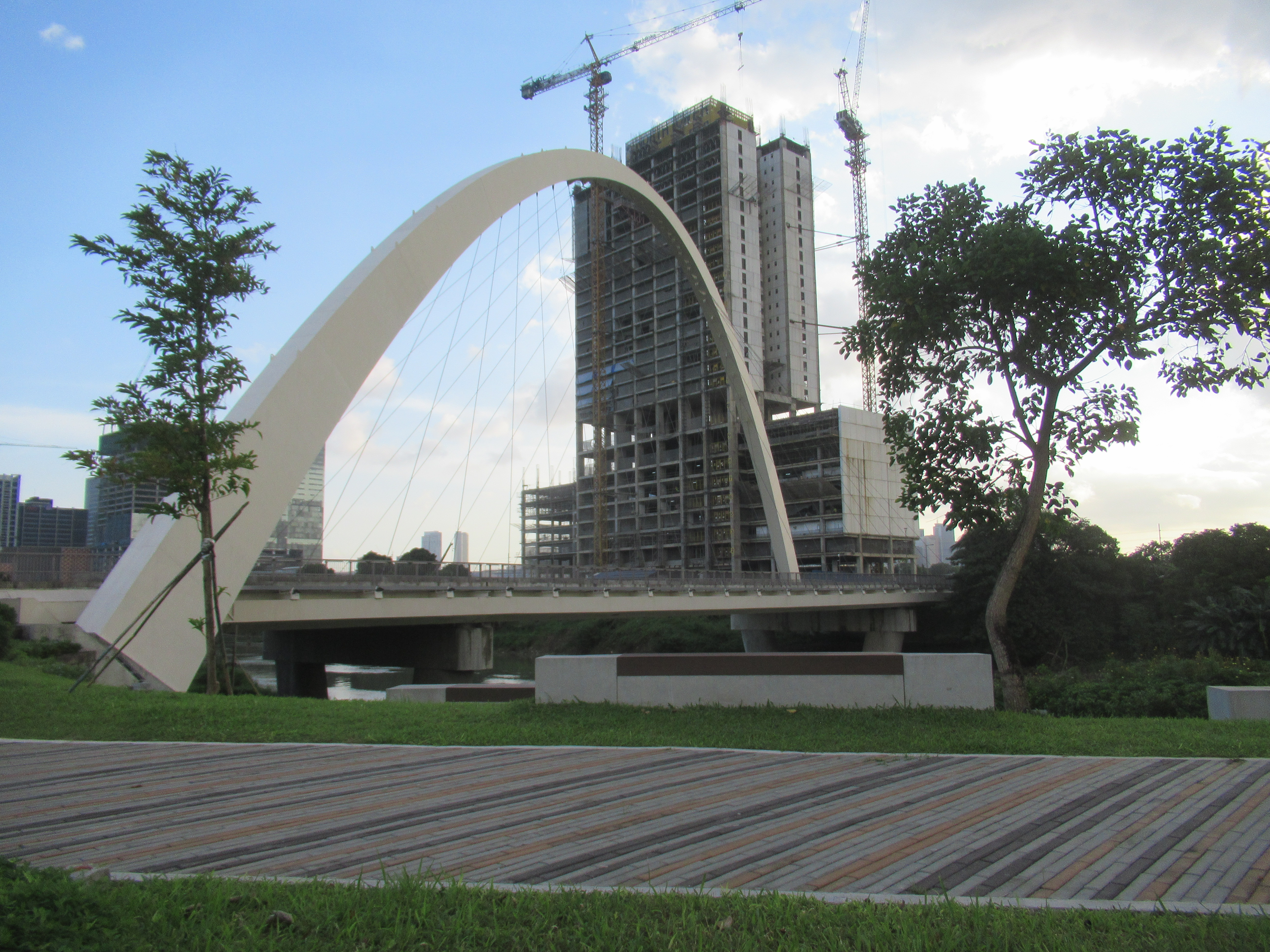
- Parklinks in 2023

Project
- Opening date: 2016
- Developer: ALI Eton Property Development Corp.
- Owner: ALI Eton Property Development Corp.
- Website: parklinks.ph

Physical features
- Transport: 16 18 36 39 41 50 56 61 Green Meadows Avenue

Location
- Interactive map of Parklinks
- Coordinates: 14°35′58″N 121°5′1″E
- Location: Metro Manila, Philippines
- Address: Eulogio Rodriguez Avenue Jr. (C-5 Road)

Parklinks is a 35-hectare (86-acre) mixed-use development that straddles the Pasig–Quezon City boundaries in the Philippines. It is a joint project of LT Group and Ayala Land located on the banks of the Marikina River in the eastern part of Metro Manila. The riverfront development is the biggest along the segment of C-5 Road north of the Pasig River and is planned to contain a 3-hectare (7.4-acre) central urban park, an esplanade, river terrace, riparian gardens and bike trails designed to make it one of the greenest urban estates in the Manila metropolitan area.

== Location ==
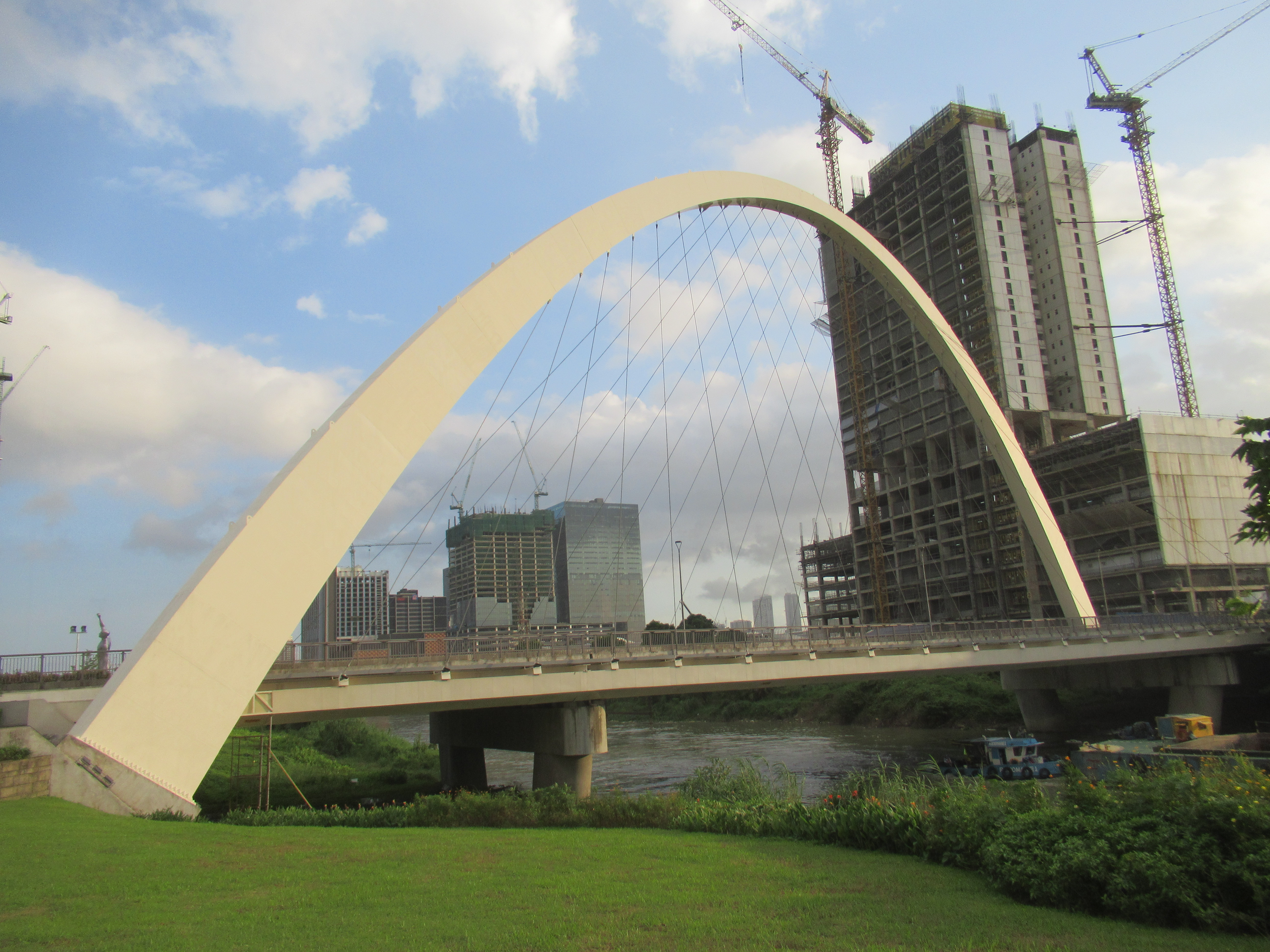
Parklinks Bridge, a 200-meter-long (660 ft) arch bridge, links developments on both sides of the Marikina River

Parklinks occupies two parcels of land separated by the Marikina River which marks the border between Pasig and Quezon City. The larger portion of the development, 30 hectares (74 acres), is on a small peninsula bounded on three sides by a meander of the river in Manggahan, Pasig adjoining the village of Rosario to the south. The remaining 5 hectares (12 acres) is on a narrow strip of land across the river to the west in Ugong Norte, Quezon City with C-5 Road (Eulogio Rodriguez Jr. Avenue) frontage. An iconic 110-metre (360 ft) long bridge is planned to connect these properties on both sides of the Marikina River. Across the river to the east from the Pasig property is the Circulo Verde development situated on the inside of another bend of the river in Bagumbayan, Quezon City. It is neighbored by several manufacturing facilities and warehouses such as the Piscor Compound and Litton Mills on Amang Rodriguez Avenue. Its Quezon City property on the west is flanked by a mix of commercial and industrial buildings and neighbors the Bridgetowne township of Robinsons Land to the south and the Green Meadows gated village across C-5 to the west.

== History ==
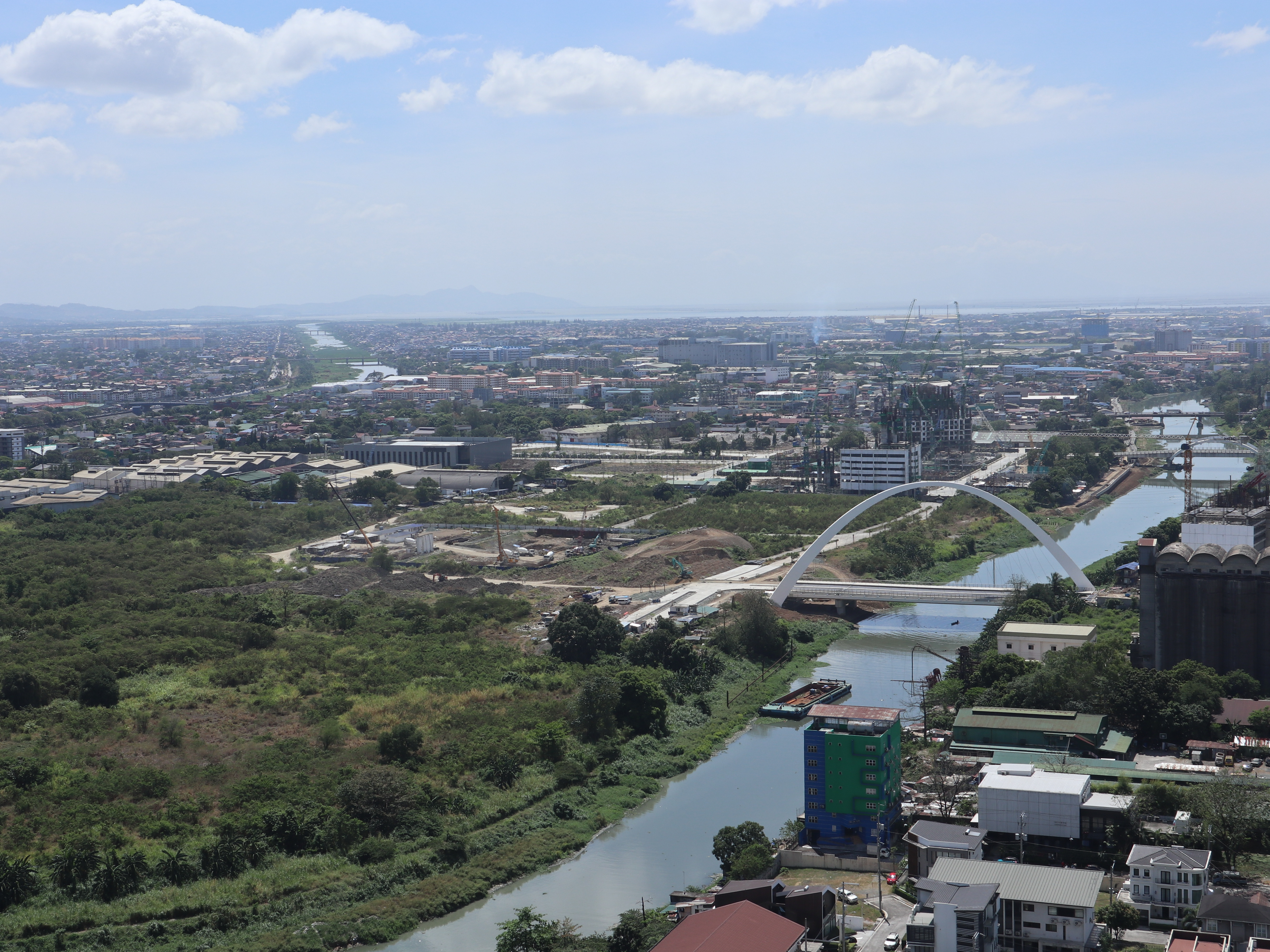
Site of the development with the Parklinks Bridge

Parklinks is a redevelopment of a former steel mill site in a rapidly gentrifying area of the C-5 corridor between Libis and Pasig. In January 2016, Ayala Land and LT Group's Eton Properties Philippines entered into a partnership to jointly develop the 30-hectare Manggahan property owned by Eton and the adjacent 5-hectare Ugong Norte property owned by Ayala. The joint venture, ALI Eton Property Development Corp., is 50% owned by Eton and 50% owned by Ayala. The first phase of the development was launched in January 2018 with ₱53 billion in committed investment over ten years.

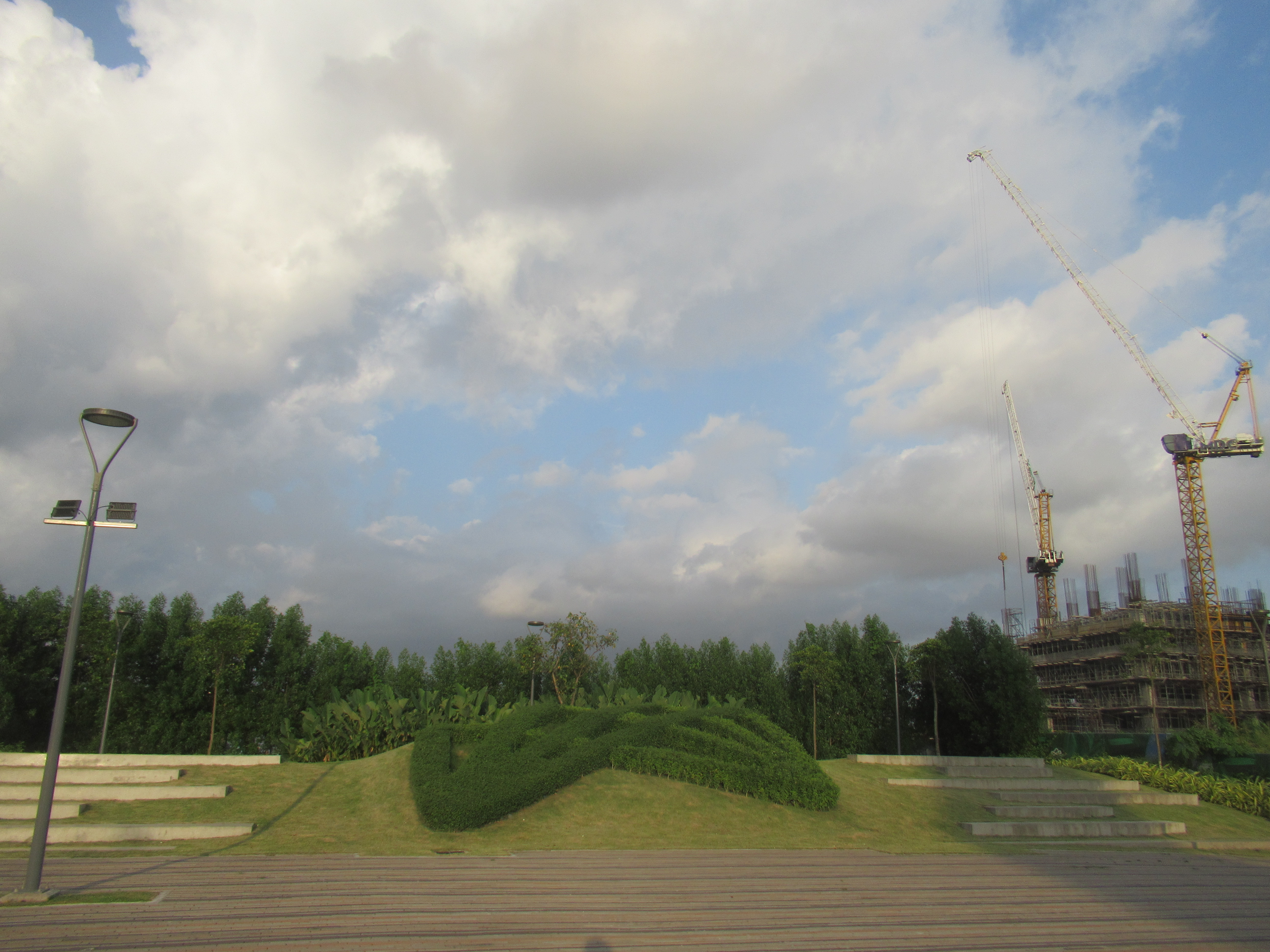
The gardens

== Projects ==
The first phase of the Parklinks development will include three office towers, the first of which will rise atop a shopping mall. The estate was designed with large green open spaces comprising fifty percent of the area.

=== Ayala Malls Parklinks ===
Parklinks mall is a lifestyle center under construction in the Quezon City side of the estate fronting C-5. It will have 52,000 square metres (560,000 sq ft) of retail space spread over five floors and will also house a 3,500-square-metre (38,000 sq ft) sports complex consisting of a basketball court, volleyball court, badminton courts and fitness gym.

=== Residential developments ===
Ayala Land Premier is developing a luxury condominium in Parklinks. Two other Ayala Land residential brands, Alveo and Avida, will also be building their own residential projects on the property.

Educational Institution

MIIS ( Multiple Intelligence International School ): a progressive international school, partnered with Ayala Land and Eton Properties to establish their new campus within the Parklinks estate acting as one of the anchor educational institutions within the estate.

==== Parklinks Towers ====
Plans for the Parklinks North Tower were unveiled in November 2018. It will be Ayala Land's first luxury condominium development in Quezon City. The 55-storey, 280-unit building will have direct links to the shopping mall and the river esplanade. It is expected to be turned over by 2025. A second luxury condominium development was announced in September 2019. Parklinks South Tower will house 313 units.

==== The Lattice ====
The Lattice is a 43-storey residential tower project by Alveo Land, a subsidiary of Ayala Land. Announced in November 2019, the development will be built right next to Parklinks' central park.

== See also ==
- Greenhills
- Araneta City
- Eastwood City
- Bridgetowne
- Ortigas East
- Arcovia City
- Capitol Commons
- Ortigas Center
