= Ang Huling El Bimbo (musical) =

2018 jukebox musical by Dingdong Novenario

- a musical featuring the songs of the most iconic 90's band
- Book: Dingdong Novenario
- Premiere: July 20, 2018: Newport Performing Arts Theatre, Metro Manila
- Productions: 2018; 2019; 2023

Ang Huling El Bimbo: a musical featuring the songs of the most iconic 90's band popularly known as Ang Huling El Bimbo, is a jukebox musical written by Dingdong Novenario, featuring the hit songs of the Filipino band Eraserheads. It features the lyrics and melodies of at least 40 of the band's songs, including the titular song. Dexter Santos directed and choreographed the musical, with Myke Salomon serving as its musical director. The Manila Philharmonic Orchestra, conducted by Rodel Colmenar, provided the music, accompanied by a live band. The set design is by Gino Gonzales, with lighting by Monino Duque.

The musical premiered on July 20, 2018 at the Newport Performing Arts Theatre in Pasay. A second production was made in 2019 featuring new cast, and ran from March 1 to April 6, and again from July 5 to August 18. A recorded 2019 performance was streamed for free online on the official YouTube channel and Facebook page of ABS-CBN from May 8 to 9, 2020. It was also streamed on TFC Online in September 2020, and on digital platform KTX.PH from November 28 to 29, 2020.

== Background ==
Director Dexter Santos first watched the band perform when he was a Theatre Arts college student at the University of the Philippines Baguio in the 1990s. Later, as a teacher at the University of the Philippines Diliman, Santos required his Theatre Arts students to perform an hour-long piece based on an Eraserheads song.

== Plot ==
=== Act 1 ===
The show opens with someone dancing. As the light goes dim, a corpse is shown. The next scene then shows three men, Emman, Anthony, and Hector, having problems with work. (“Poor Man’s Grave”/“Slo Mo”/“Walang Nagbago”). They are then called to inform them that Joy Manawari has died (“Waiting For The Bus”/“Sino Sa Atin”).

Three young men named Emmanuel “Emman” M. Azarcon, Anthony “AJ” F. Cruz, Jr., and Hector Q. Samala are being sent off to college by their parents ("Toyang"/“Waiting For The Bus”), who then become roommates (“Minsan”/“Alapaap”/“Tindahan Ni Aling Nena”).

Back in present day, the police officer questions the connection of Joy to three of them (“Ligaya”). A flashback shows them being introduced to their CAT commandant, Arturo Banlaoi, their student leader, Andre Antonio, and a fried banana seller, Joy Manawari (“Cutterpillow”). Joy lives with her Tiya Dely and they run a karinderya named Toyang’s (“Lightyears”/“Pare Ko”/“Ligaya”/“Shirley”/“Tikman”).

Andre breaks up with Joy because of Banlaoi (“Ligaya”/“Tama Ka”). The trio tries to comfort her, and vice versa (“Huwag Kang Matakot”/“Sembreak”/“Hey Jay”/”Wishing Wells”/“Fine Time”). Back in present day, Banlaoi makes the trio wait for Joy's daughter (“Ligaya”) and her aunt (“Shirley”/“Tikman”/“Bogchi Hokbu”)

Another flashback shows them ditching their graduation rehearsals for a joyride to Antipolo (“Alapaap”/“Fill Her”). They are interrupted by drunk men who then take the trio hostage and violate Joy.

=== Act 2 ===
In the midst of graduating students, she tries to find the three boys but they are evasive (“With A Smile”). Joy has flashbacks of that fateful night (“Spoliarium”). Banlaoi forces Tiya Dely and Joy to sell beer and girls at Toyang's so the business won’t close (“Tikman”/“Paru-parong Ningning”). Tiya Dely confronts Joy about her late nights. They plan to return to the province but Banlaoi makes Joy stay behind so she can become his drug mule (“Kilala”/“Balikbayan Box”/“Alkohol”).

An older Joy still works as a drug courier for Banlaoi to provide for her daughter (Ligaya/“With A Smile”/“Spoliarium”). Joy tries to contact the trio to make them avengers but they are busy: Hector with his TV series (“Maskara”). Emman with his work and wife (“Poor Man’s Grave”/“Magasin”), and Anthony about his sexuality (“Kailan”/“Torpedo”/“Kaliwete”). Several women confront Hector (“Walang Nagbago”/“Huwag Mo Nang Itanong”/“Maselang Bahaghari”/“Umaaraw Umuulan”). Joy goes back to the house and writes a letter for Ligaya (“Ligaya"/"Spoliarium”). The trio is seen fighting (“Spoliarium”). Joy calls them but no one answers, and is then hit by a vehicle (“Wating”).

Tiya Dely and Ligaya enter the morgue (“Fill Her”/“Ligaya”). Banlaoi tries to give them money but they refuse. Hector tells Tiya Dely that they would shoulder the funeral costs. Ligaya talks to the trio and they promise to take care of her (“Ang Huling El Bimbo”).

== Roles and principal cast ==
Principal Cast
Character	2018	2019 (Red Team)	2019 (Blue Team)	2023
Joy Manawari	Menchu Lauchengco-Yulo	Carla Guevara Laforteza	Menchu Lauchengco-Yulo	Menchu Lauchengco-Yulo / Katrine Sunga
Hector Samala	Gian Magdangal	David Ezra	Gian Magdangal	Gian Magdangal
Emman Azarcon	OJ Mariano	Myke Salomon	OJ Mariano	OJ Mariano / Bullet Dumas
Anthony "AJ" Cruz	Jon Santos	Rafa Siguion-Reyna	Jon Santos	Nino Alejandro
Young Joy	Tanya Manalang	Tanya Manalang	Gab Pangilinan	Gab Pangilinan
Young Hector	Reb Atadero / Bibo Reyes	Reb Atadero	Bibo Reyes	Anthony Rosaldo
Young Emman	Boo Gabunada	Nicco Manalo / Vic Robinson	Boo Gabunada	Paw Castillo
Young AJ	Topper Fabregas	Lance Reblando	Phi Palmos	Topper Fabregas
Tiya Dely	Shiela Francisco	Shiela Francisco	Shiela Francisco	Shiela Francisco
Arturo Banlaoi	Jamie Wilson	Paolo O'Hara / Tad Tadioan	Jamie Wilson	Jamie Wilson

=== Principal characters ===
- Joy Manawari - A young woman who helps her aunt run a small eatery inside a college campus. To augment their earnings, she also sells afternoon snacks to the students
- Hector Samala - A rich film student looking to learn more about directing and film at a local college before flying out to attend a film school in New York.
- Emman Azarcon - A provincial student aspiring to become a lawyer. He is the first person in their family to attend college in the city.
- AJ Cruz - A closeted military brat studying Business Management. He is verbally and physically abused by his father for being gay.
- Tiya Dely - Joy Manawari's aunt. She runs a small eatery called Toyang's that serves affordable meals to college students.
- Arturo Banlaoi - A CAT college commandant-turned-councilor who runs an illicit drug ring.
