= Parklinks Bridge =

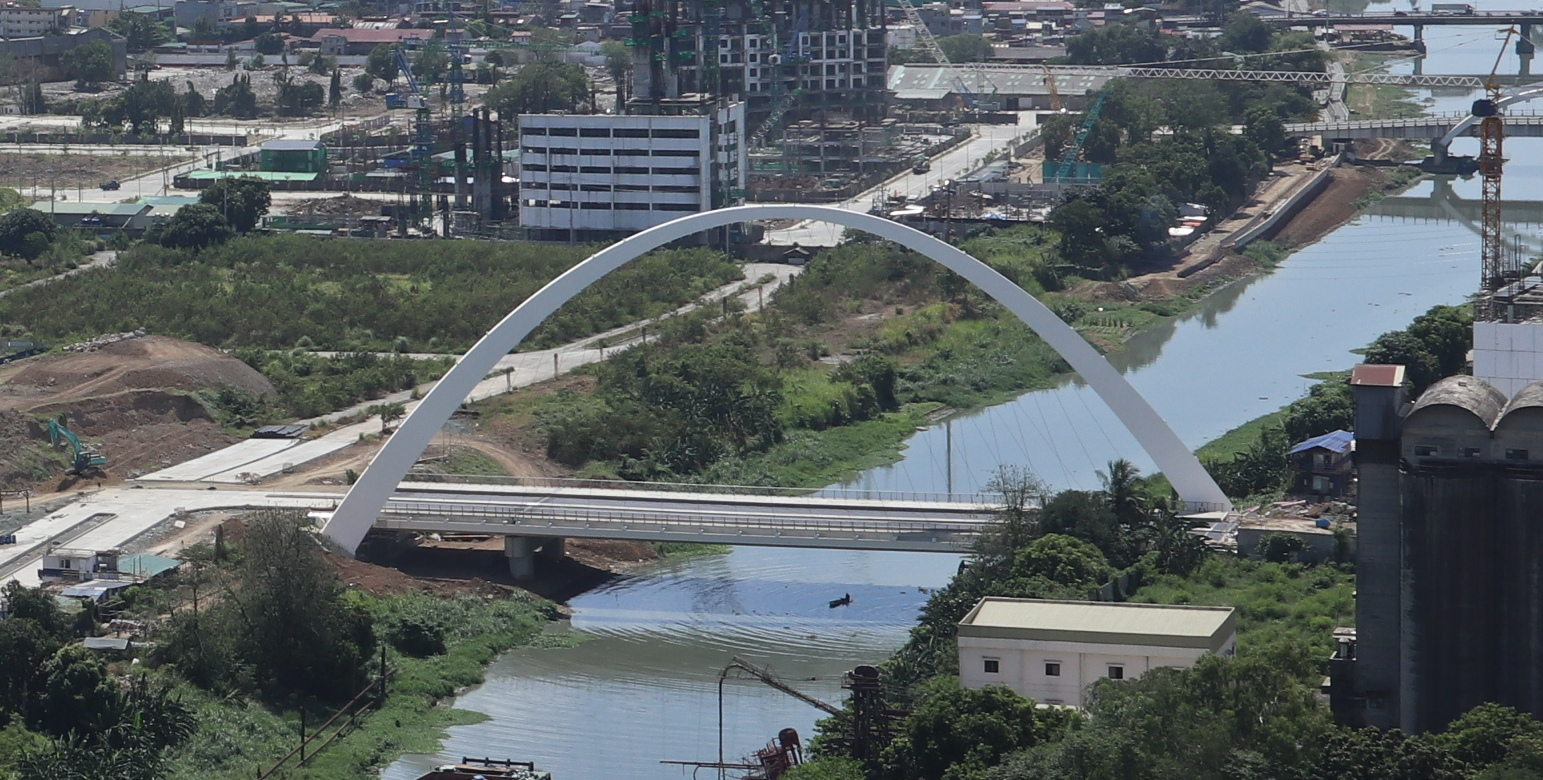
- Coordinates: 14°35′57″N 121°04′57″E
- Carries: Motor vehicles, pedestrians and bicycles
- Crosses: Marikina River
- Locale: Parklinks, Pasig and Quezon City, Metro Manila, Philippines
- Named for: Parklinks
- Preceded by: Caruncho Bridge
- Followed by: Bridgetowne Bridge

Characteristics
- Total length: 110 m (361 ft)
- Width: 25 m (82 ft)
- Height: 40 m (131 ft)

History
- Inaugurated: November 28, 2022

The Parklinks Bridge is a road bridge connecting Pasig and Quezon City in Metro Manila, Philippines.

== Background ==
The Parklinks Bridge is a structure which crosses over the Marikina River, connecting the cities of Pasig and Quezon City. It is part of the Parklinks mixed-use development of Ayala Land and Eton Properties. The road bridge spans 110 m (360 ft) and has a width of 25 m (82 ft). Imitating a cable-stayed bridge, Parklinks Bridge has a 40 m (130 ft) high arch with a diagonal base. It has Systra Philippines and Systra Korea as its structural designers. It was inaugurated on November 28, 2022.
