= Rosas (Nica del Rosario song) =

2022 song by Nica del Rosario featuring Gab Pangilinan

Single by Nica del Rosario featuring Gab Pangilinan
- Language: Tagalog
- Released: March 4, 2022
- Recorded: 2022
- Genre: OPM, political
- Length: 4:33
- Label: FlipMusic Records
- Composers: Gianina Camille "Nica" del Rosario, Rap Sanchez
- Producers: Nica del Rosario, Rap Sanchez

Nica del Rosario singles chronology
"Kay Leni Tayo" (2021)	"Rosas" (2022)	"Live Forever" (2022)

Music video
- "Rosas" on YouTube

"Rosas" (transl. rose or pink) is a song by Filipino singer-songwriter Nica del Rosario featuring theater actress Gab Pangilinan. It was written and produced by del Rosario and Rap Sanchez and was released on March 4, 2022, through FlipMusic Records. The song was a tribute to then-Vice President and 2022 presidential candidate Leni Robredo.

== Background and composition ==
Del Rosario told Billboard Philippines how "Rosas" almost never came to fruition. She described the song's creation as unplanned and emotionally driven, recalling, “It was almost an accident. I had so much emotion, because it was 2 in the morning. There was so much chaos going on in our country… I just wanted to help.”

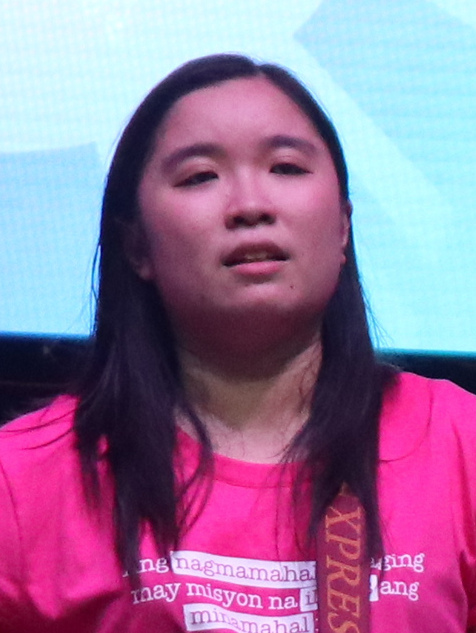
Nica del Rosario, the singer and composer of "Rosas".

Prompted by a friend's challenge, del Rosario wrote the song quickly, inspired by her emotions and support from her wife, Justine Peña. Initially hesitant to release it in late 2021, she was convinced by her partner and colleagues that people needed to hear "Rosas." Within weeks, del Rosario and Gab Pangilinan recorded and released the song.

The unexpected impact of "Rosas" made del Rosario believe in herself again and realize that people valued her voice. It also marked a shift in her career from writing for others to using her own voice to inspire a movement among Filipinos.

Prior to "Rosas", she also recorded and released a campaign jingle titled "Kay Leni Tayo" featuring Jeli Mateo and Peña, on August 17, 2021, two months before Leni Robredo filed her certificate of candidacy for President. While "Kay Leni Tayo" was fast-paced, youthful, and incorporates rap melodies, "Rosas" is a slower, and more heartfelt pop political song performed in the key of D♯/E♭ Major using 6/8 time with a tempo of 150 beats per minute. The song features theater actress Gab Pangilinan, who is also the niece of the Robredo's running-mate, Senator Kiko Pangilinan. Del Rosario described the song as the "imagined point-of-view of Vice President Leni Robredo... what she would like to say to the people of this nation [Filipinos]". It was also inspired by the Sara Bareilles-penned song, "Seriously", performed by Leslie Odom, Jr., which takes the perspective of U.S. president Barack Obama.

== Music video ==
The music video directed by Treb Monteras premiered on April 22, 2022, a day before Robredo's birthday. It was made possible through the efforts of Film Workers for Leni, FlipMusic Records, and all volunteers and supporters of Robredo.

It features a diverse group of women including actresses, vloggers, activists, models, and singers such as Gabby Padilla, Yana Kalaw, Levina Alabanza, Leanne & Naara, Natasha Kintanar, Janina Gacosta, Robredo's daughters Aika and Tricia Robredo, Wynona Galvez, Gretchen Laurel, Zsaris, Saab Magalona, Jennycha Victorio, Janina Vela, Chai Fonacier, Mia Reyes, Ayn Bernos, Madelene de Borja, Gelyn Rosillo, Tippy Dos Santos, Cha Roque, Ma Line Nalangan, Ymi Sy, May Alabanza, Mela Habijan, Kelsey Hadjirul, Ceej Tantengco, Pangilinan's niece Hannah Pangilinan, Mitzi Sumilang, Alex Castro, Ana Patricia "Patreng" Non, Save San Roque Alliance and Bing Domantay.

== Live performances ==
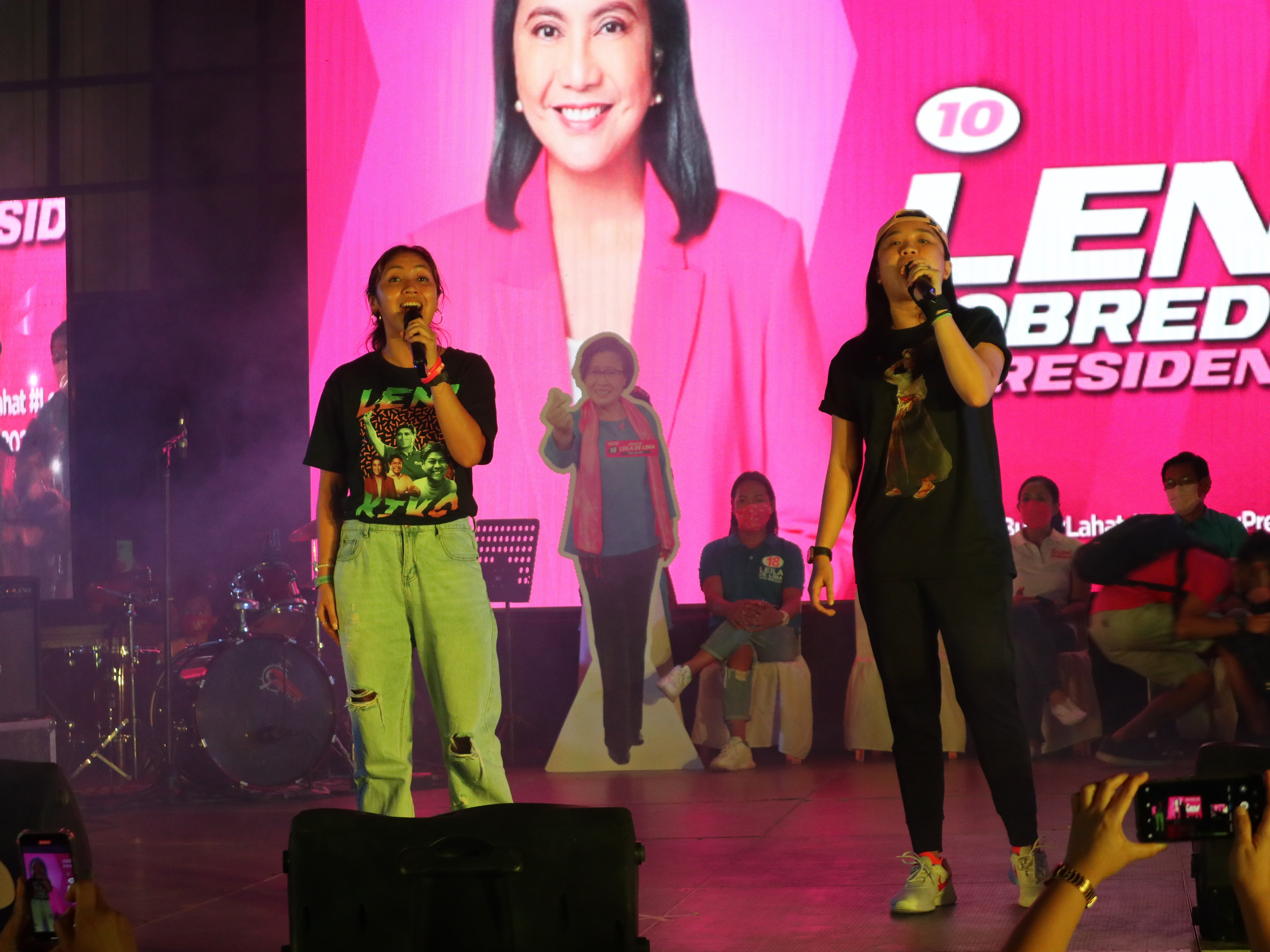
Nica del Rosario and Gab Pangilinan performing "Rosas" during the Leni-Kiko Lakad ng Pag-asa rally in Quezon City.

On March 20, 2022, del Rosario and Pangilinan performed at F. Ortigas Jr. Road (Emerald Avenue) in Pasig City for the grand rally dubbed "PasigLaban". They also performed on April 5, 2023, at Rizal Capitol Grounds in Antipolo, Rizal, for the "People's Rally". On April 23, 2022, del Rosario and Pangilinan, along with Bukas Palad Music Ministry, performed a new version of the song in Pasay City to celebrate Robredo's 57th birthday at "Araw Na10 'To! H2H Day at People's Rally para sa Kaarawan ni VP Leni Robredo", attended by over 400,000 people. On May 7, 2022, del Rosario performed at Ayala Avenue in Makati City with Filipino comedian and It's Showtime host Vice Ganda during the Angat Buhay Pilipino Miting De Avance. It was attended by almost 750,000 people, making it the campaign's biggest rally.

On that same event, Maysh Baay of Moonstar88, Jomal Linao and Allan Burdeos of Kamikazee, Ariel Lumanlan of Chelsea Alley and Arcadia, and Carissa Ramos of Catfight performed a rock version of the song and released it shortly after the performance.

== Extended version ==
"Rosas (Extended Version)"

Single by Nica del Rosario, Gab Pangilinan, Matthew Chang, and Tinig Tumitindig Grand Choir
- Released: June 3, 2022
- Recorded: 2022
- Genre: OPM, political
- Length: 5:17
- Label: FlipMusic Records
- Songwriter: Gianina Camille "Nica" del Rosario

On May 10, 2022, del Rosario posted on Twitter the new additional verses and snippets for "Rosas", later referred as the "extended version", following partial, unofficial results that showed Robredo's opponent, Bongbong Marcos, leading by a wide margin. The lyrics were inspired by Robredo's speech, where she expressed gratitude to supporters, assured volunteers that their efforts have not been in vain, and encouraged them on to continue the fight beyond the elections.

Five days after the election, on May 14, 2022, del Rosario and Pangilinan, accompanied by violinist Matthew Chang, performed the extended version at a thanksgiving event, titled "Tayo ang Liwanag: Isang Pasasalamat", held at the Ateneo de Manila University in Quezon City.

The extended version was officially released on June 3, 2022, across all streaming platforms. It features Gab Pangilinan, violinist Matthew Chang, and the Tinig Tumintindig Grand Choir.

== Rosas: The Song. The Journey ==
A documentary titled Rosas: The Song. The Journey, directed by Nolan Bernardino, was produced to explore the impact and creation process of the song. It is a joint project by FlipMusic Productions and Happy House Manila and was released on February 25, 2023, with exclusive screening on cinemas. The documentary features interviews with Nica del Rosario, collaborators, and discusses the song's significance in Philippine politics and culture. The documentary provides insights into the song's journey from inception to its release and subsequent reception among the public, both as a work of art and as a symbol of hope for a better future.

== Notable cover versions ==
- On 8 May 2022, Julie Anne San Jose posted a short acoustic rendition of the song on her Twitter account.

== Chart performance ==
"Rosas" debuts at number twenty-one on Billboard Hits of the World (Philippines Songs) chart on the week dated May 14, 2022. It eventually skyrocketed and peaked at number two the following week, behind anees' "Sun and Moon". It also topped local iTunes and Apple Music charts. On Spotify Philippines daily chart, "Rosas" rises to number-one on the election day (May 9, 2022) with 372,499 local streams, becoming the first all-female duet by OPM artists number-one song on the said chart. It remains at number-one, the following day, with an increased 403,997 local streams. "Rosas" became the first number-one song by an OPM female artist since Moira Dela Torre's featured role on Ben&Ben's 2021 song "Pasalubong" and the first number-one song by an OPM female lead artist since Dela Torre's "Paubaya" (2020). With the notable performance of "Rosas" on Spotify, Nica del Rosario became the first OPM female artist to reach the top ten of the Spotify Philippines Daily Top Artists chart. At that time, Del Rosario and Gab Pangilinan has joined Dela Torre as the only OPM female artist to reach number-one on Spotify Philippines chart.

It also reached number-one on the Philippines and global Spotify Viral charts.

== Track listings ==
- Digital download
1. "Rosas" – 4:33
- Digital download – Extended Version
1. "Rosas" – 5:17
- Digital download – Brian Cua Dance Remix
1. "Rosas" (Brian Cua Dance Remix) – 4:16
- Digital download – Toy Armada Orchestral Tribute
1. "Rosas" (Toy Armada Orchestral Tribute) – 4:28

== Personnel ==
Credits adapted from YouTube.

- Gianina Camille "Nica" del Rosario – vocal, guitarist, composer
- Gab Pangilinan – vocal
- Matthew Chang – violin
- Rap Sanchez – mixed, mastered
- Jeralph Sanchez – composer

== Charts ==
Weekly chart performance for "Rosas"
Chart (2022)	Peak position
Philippines (Billboard)	2

== Awards and nominations ==
Year	Awards ceremony	Category	Results	Refs
2022	Big Bold Brave Awards	Gen Z Approved Hit	Nominated	
2023	Awit Awards 2023	Record of the Year	Nominated	
2023	Awit Awards 2023	Song of the Year	Nominated	
2023	Awit Awards 2023	Best Collaboration	Won	
2023	Awit Awards 2023	Best Ballad Recording	Nominated	

== See also ==
- Leni Robredo 2022 presidential campaign
