= Multiple Intelligence International School =

Multiple Intelligence International School (MIIS)

Location
- Parklinks Estate, Pasig City; Philippines; 14°35′58″N 121°05′01″E

Information
- School type: Progressive
- Motto: With Our Intelligences, We Make A Difference!
- Established: 1996
- Founder: Dr. Mary Joy Canon Abaquin, EdD
- Lower and Middle School Principal: Mikhal Arroyo
- Upper School Principal: Dr. Mary Joy Canon Abaquin, EdD (Acting)
- Grades: Preschool-12
- Accreditation: Council of International Schools
- Website: www.mischool.edu.ph

Multiple Intelligence International School (MIIS) is an international progressive school. The Campus of MIIS is located in Parklinks, Pasig, where it features classrooms for students grades K-12.

== History ==
The Multiple Intelligence International School was first established as Child's Place Preschool in 1996, by Mary Joy Canon-Abaquin.

It is the first educational institution in the Philippines that has based its approach on the multiple intelligence framework of Harvard-based cognitive psychologist, Howard Gardner.

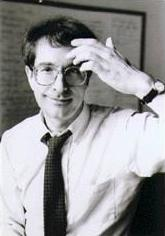
MIIS follows the Multiple Intelligences Framework by Dr. Howard Gardner

Child's Place is the preschool department of MIIS that caters to the Preschool Child from 2 to 5 years. The Multiple Intelligence International School (Grades 1-8) was founded to serve Lower and Middle School students. MIIS Upper School (Grades 9-12), was founded in 2007.

In 2012, music researcher Pamela Costes-Onishi conducted a study that evaluated MIIS' Music Education curriculum with that of the Department of Education and found that it had distinct differences in approach and pedagogy.

In 2016, MIIS celebrated their 20th founding anniversary.

In 2018, MIIS was given accreditation by the Council of International Schools. MIIS was the fourth international school in the Philippines to attain CIS accreditation at the time.

On September 23, 2019, MIIS partnered with Smart Communications to hold the Youth Innovation Challenge, at the Philippine International Convention Center.

== Academics and curriculum ==
MIIS focuses on eight intelligences among their students, following Howard Gardner's Multiple Intelligences Theory.

The K-12 program covers six years of primary education, four years of Junior High School, and two years of Senior High School. MIIS is aligned with the Philippine Department of Education standards for the enhanced K-12 program.

The school has been acknowledged as a leader in youth entrepreneurship in the Philippines.

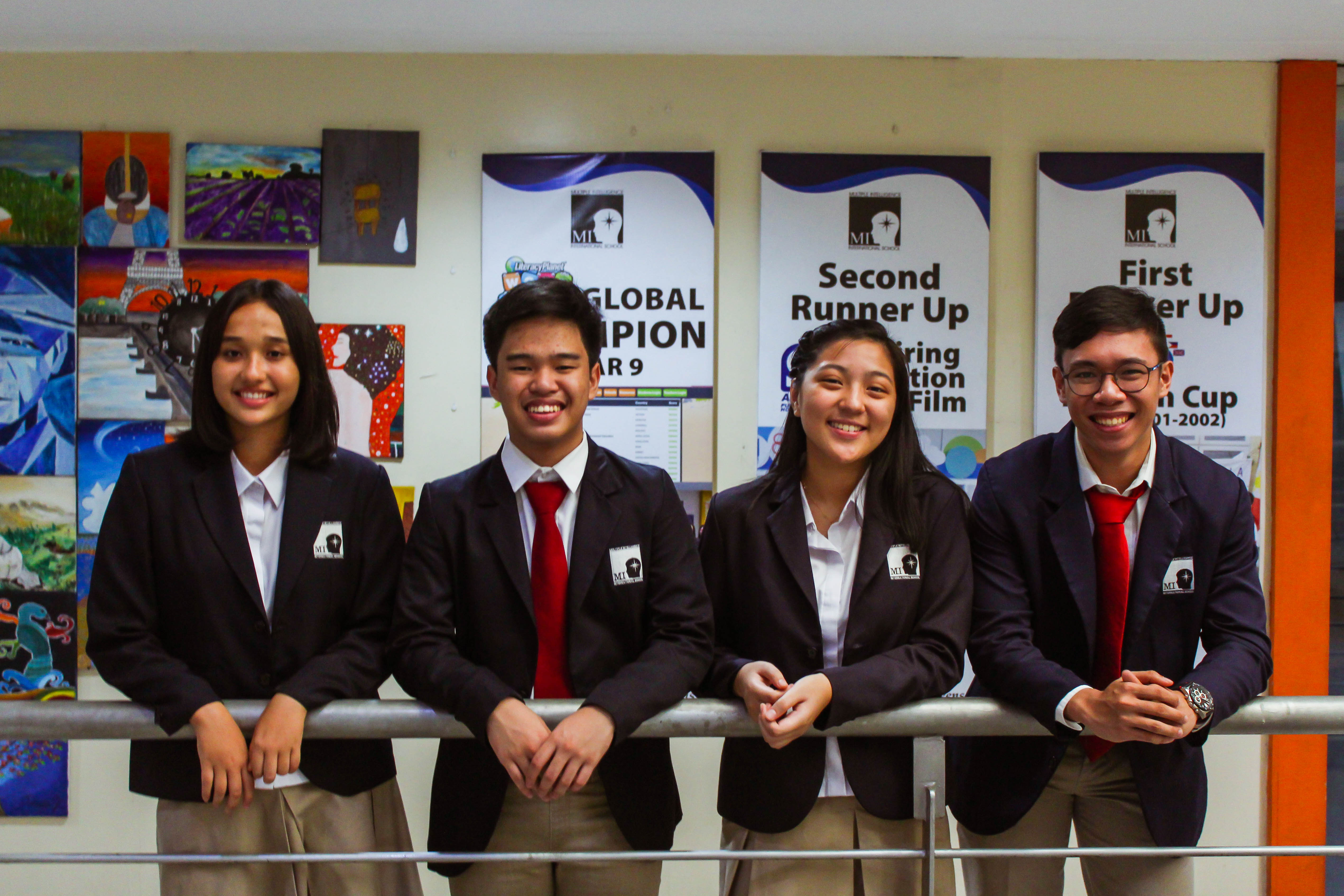
Students from the MIIS Upper School wearing the MIIS uniform.

== Campus ==
MIIS (Multiple Intelligence International School) is situated in a newly-built campus along Road 3 within the master-planned Parklinks estate, a mixed-use development that straddles the boundary between Pasig and Quezon City, positioned near the banks of the Marikina River.

The MIIS Main Campus was previously situated at Loyola Heights, Quezon City (Housing Preschool, Lower School and Middle School), along with another campus previously situated at Elizabeth Hall, Katipunan Avenue, Quezon City (Housing Upper School, Grades 9-12).

== Notable alumni ==
- Ange Kouame, basketball player (Ateneo Blue Eagles, Philippines national team)
- Sophia Laforteza, singer (Katseye)
