= Carla Guevara Laforteza =

Filipina singer and actress (born 1975)

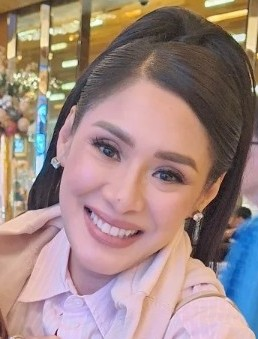
- Guevara in 2024

Background information
- Born: Maria Carla Helena Amado Guevara; December 26, 1975 (age 50); Manila, Philippines
- Genres: R&B, musical theater, jazz, praise and worship
- Occupations: Singer, actress
- Instrument: Vocals
- Years active: 1993–present
- Label: Rebel Philippines
- Spouse: Godfrey Laforteza III (m. 2002)
- Children: 3, including Sophia

Maria Carla Helena Amado Guevara-Laforteza (born December 26, 1975) is a Filipina musical theater actress who performs in both local and international productions. She is known for playing Kim and Gigi in Miss Saigon in West End, London, in the 1990s. She is also a recording artist and talent handler.

== Education and personal life ==
On March 2, 2002, Guevara married dancer and chef Godfrey Laforteza III in Long Island, New York. They have three children, including Sophia (born 2002), a singer and leader of the Los Angeles-based girl group Katseye.

== Career ==
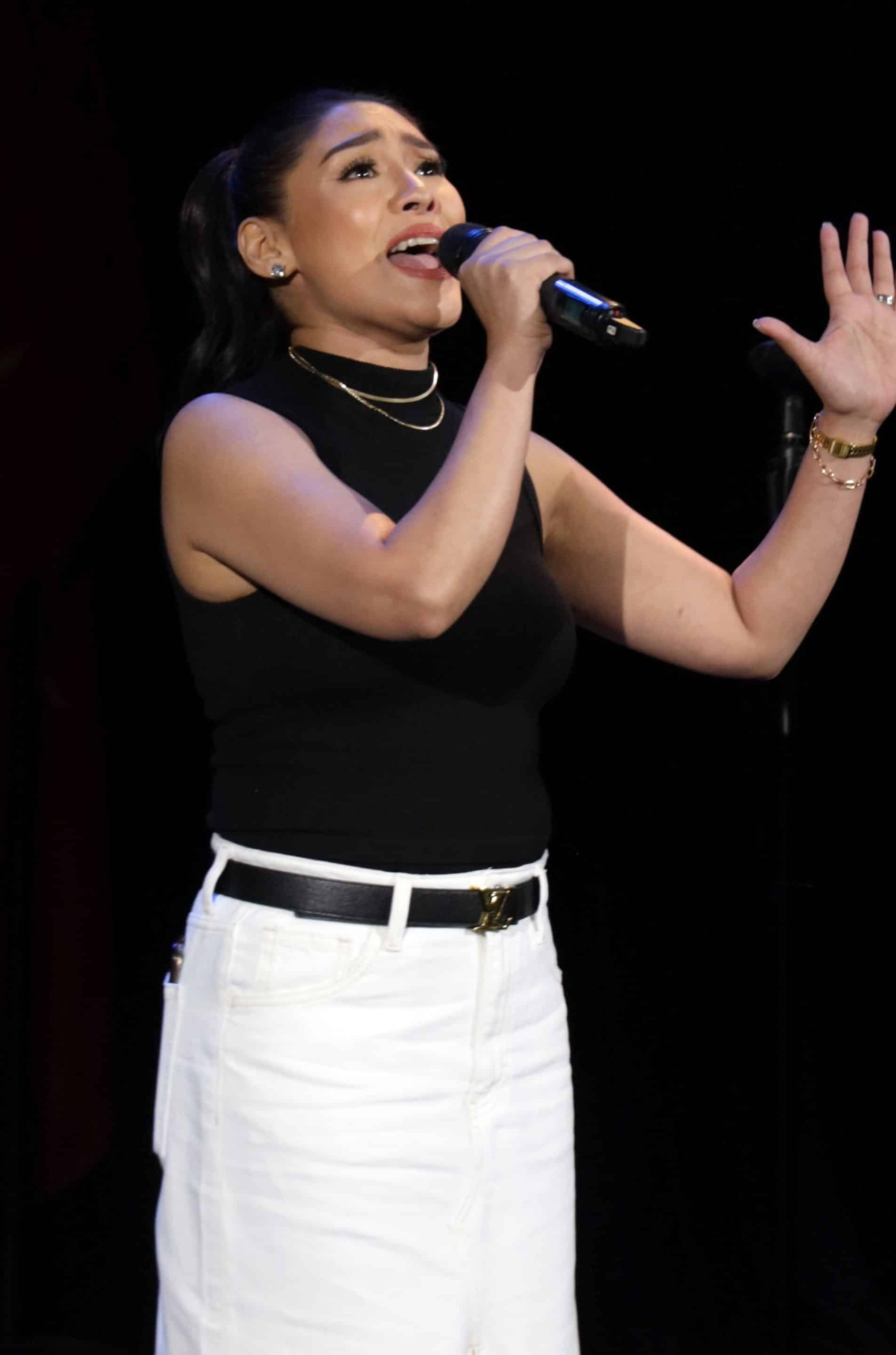
Guevara Laforteza performing at the Cultural Center of the Philippines in 2024

Laforteza started with the Rep Children's Theater in 1993, where she was cast in various plays such as Camelot, Once on This Island, Annie, Romeo and Juliet, and Taming of the Shrew.

In 1995, she joined the Miss Saigon production in London as an understudy for "Kim", "Gigi" and "Yvette". She stayed there for two years

In 1997, she went back to the Philippines and appeared in theatrical and television shows.

In 1999, Laforteza began her career in television in Munting Paraiso, ABS-CBN drama series.

From 2001 to 2005, she moved to New York and worked there as a baker, medical assistant, restaurant manager, and salesperson, among others. She earned a degree in Hotel Operations Management and took courses at New York University in acting.

In 2011, Laforteza did the role of Nina in Breakups and Breakdowns.

She also did the roles of Sour Kangaroo in Repertory Philippines' production of Seussical and Sister Berthe in Resort World Manila's Sound of Music.

In 2013, Laforteza was among the actress of Be Careful with My Heart, a television hit series in the Philippines

In 2018, Laforteza played the role Lily in Binonodo, a Tsinoy Musical wherein she was recognized as Aliw Best Actress in Musical.

In 2019, Laforteza was chosen to play as Joy in Ang Huling El Bimbo, stage production that featured Eraserheads hit songs. She received honor for in this performance as 2019 LEAF Award for Most Outstanding Actress in a Musical.

In 2022, Laforteza was cast in the ABS-CBN television series Flower of Evil, a Filipino adaptation of a widely popular South Korean drama. In the same year, Laforteza portrayed Rachel in Joseph the Dreamer, a role that earned her the Aliw Award for Best Featured Actress in a Musical. Her performance stood out, bringing depth to the character and contributing to the overall impact of the production.

Laforteza commemorated her 24-year journey with Star Magic, receiving a Loyalty Award in 2023.

In 2024, Laforteza played the role of Rose and Edith in One More Chance: The Musical.

Laforteza is one the Filipino stars who performed on the two-night fundraising concert "Do You Hear the People Sing?", featuring selections from Les Misérables and Miss Saigon.

Laforteza celebrated her 30th year in musical theater at the Cultural Center of the Philippines (CCP) on the Triple Threats concert "A La Carlotta" on August 11, 2024.

== Achievements ==
Carla Guevara Laforteza's recognition in Philippine theater stems from her versatility and impact on stage. Some of her notable awards include:

2024 ALIW Best Featured Actress in a Musical for One More Chance.

2023 Best Featured Actress in Musical- Snow white and the Prince. Laforteza won this award for the portrayal of the Queen in Repertory Philippines Theater Production of Snow White and the Prince.

2022 Aliw Best Featured Actress in Musical for her Role Rachel in Joseph the dreamer stage play where she sang "He opens the Window"

2019 LEAF Award for Most Outstanding Actress in a Musical for her portrayal of Joy in Ang Huling El Bimbo. The show explored themes of friendship and the challenges faced over time.

2018 Aliw Best Actress In Musical - Laforteza won this award for her role as Lily in Binondo a Tshino Musical.

GEM Award for Best Featured Artist - Laforteza was awarded this for her portrayal of Kapitana Mary Jane in Rak of Aegis. This award underscores her standout performance in a highly popular musical, which brought together comedy, music, and social themes

== Notable stage credits ==
Year	Title	Role	Location	Notes
2026	The Notebook	Mother	Manila (Theatre Group Asia)	
2026	Bagets: The Musical	Virgie	Manila (Viva Communications Inc)	
2025	Into the Woods	The Giant/Granny/Snow White	Manila (Theatre Group Asia)	
2025	Come from Away	Hannah	Manila (GMG Productions)	
2024	Going Home to Christmas	Pat	Manila (Repertory Philippines)	
2024	One More Chance: The musical	Rose/Edith	Manila (Peta)	
2023	Snow White and the Prince	Queen	Manila (Repertory Philippines)	
2022	Joseph the Dreamer	Rachel	Manila (Trumpets)	
2021	The Great Christmas Cookie Bake-Off	Isabel Guevara/Anna’s Mom/Grandma	Manila (Repertory Philippines)	
2019	The Quest for the Adarna	Adarna	Manila (Repertory Philippines)	
2019	Beautiful: The Carole King Musical	Carole's Mother	Manila (Atlantis)	
2018–2019	Ang Huling El Bimbo	Joy Manawari	Manila	
2018	Rapunzel, Rapunzel, A Very Hairy Fairy Tale	Lady Za Za	Manila (Repertory Philippines)	
2018	Binondo: A Tsinoy Musical	Lily	Manila	
2017	Matilda the Musical	Mrs. Wormwood	Manila (Atlantis)	
2017	Spamalot	The Lady of the Lake	Manila (Upstart Prod)	
2017	Once Upon a Mattress	Princess Winnifred	Manila (Ephesus Teatron Group Inc.)	
2016	Hansel and Gretel	Witch	Manila (Repertory Philippines)	
2016	Rak of Aegis	Mary Jane (MJ)	Manila (Peta)	
2016	3 Stars and a Sun	Congresswoman Inky	Manila (Peta)	
2015	Saturday Night Fever	Club Singer/Flo Manero	Manila (Atlantis)	
2014	Shrek the Musical	Dragon	Manila (Atlantis)	
2012	Nine	Carla	Manila (Atlantis)	
2011	Breakups and Breakdowns	Nina	Upstart Prod (Philippines)	
2011	Seussical	Sour Kangaroo	Manila (Repertory Philippines)	
2010	Rent	Maureen Johnson	Manila (9 Works Theatrical)	
2010	The Wedding Singer		Manila (9 Works Theatrical)	
2010	Sleeping Beauty	The Queen	Manila (Repertory Philippines)	
2009	Jack and the Beanstalk	Golden Harp	Manila (Repertory Philippines)	
2009	The 25th Annual Putnam County Spelling Bee	Olive Ostrovsky	Manila (Atlantis)	
2007	Fiddler on the Roof	Fruma-Sarah	Manila (Repertory Philippines)	
2007	Cinderella Kids	Stepmother	Manila (Repertory Philippines)	
2007	Song and Dance	Emma	Manila (Repertory Philippines)	
2001	Celebration III		Manila (Repertory Philippines)	
2000	The Little Mermaid	Princess Sapphire	Manila (Trumpets)	
1999	The King and I	Tuptim	Manila	
1998	The Taming of the Shrew	Bianca	Manila (Repertory Philippines)	
1998	Annie	Lily St. Regis	Manila (Repertory Philippines)	
1998	The Baker's Wife	Genevieve Castagnet	Manila (Repertory Philippines)	
1997	South Pacific		Manila (Repertory Philippines)	
1997	Alice in Wonderland	Alice	Manila (Repertory Philippines)	
1997	Company	Marta	Manila (Repertory Philippines)	
1995–1997	Miss Saigon	Kim/Gigi	London	
1995	Once on This Island		Manila (Repertory Philippines)	
1994	The Emperor's New Clothes	Lady Winifred	Manila (Repertory Philippines)	
1994	Camelot		Manila (Repertory Philippines)	
1994	Jack and the Beanstalk		Manila (Repertory Philippines)	
1993	Aladdin		Manila (Repertory Philippines)	

== Television appearances ==
Year	Show	Role
2025	Rainbow Rumble	Herself/Contestant
2022	Flower of Evil	Lilia Ramirez
2013–2014	Be Careful with My Heart	Ms. Pacheco
1999	Ang Munting Paraiso	Honey
