= Bobby Garcia =

Filipino theatre (1969–2024)

Roberto "Bobby" Trinidad Garcia (1969–2024) was a Filipino theatre director, producer, and casting director.

== Early life and education ==
Born in Manila in 1969, Garcia's passion for theatre began after seeing Annie on Broadway as a child. He moved to New York at 17, earning a Bachelor of Arts from Fordham University and later an Master of Fine Arts in directing from the University of British Columbia.

== Career ==
In 1999, Garcia founded Atlantis Productions in the Philippines to stage professional musical theatre, beginning with a production of Rent. Garcia, who directed more than 50 musicals, won three Aliw Awards for direction and was inducted into its Hall of Fame.

In 2005, Garcia was appointed the first show director for Hong Kong Disneyland. As a casting consultant, his projects included the international tour of Disney's The Lion King and the Broadway revival of M. Butterfly. A frequent collaborator with actress Lea Salonga, Garcia worked with her on numerous productions, including an acclaimed version of Sweeney Todd.

In 2023, Garcia served as a co-producer and casting consultant for the Broadway musical Here Lies Love, notable for being the first Broadway show with an all-Filipino main cast. Following the closure of Atlantis during the COVID-19 pandemic, Garcia co-founded Theatre Group Asia with Clint Ramos. During this period, he moved to Vancouver and directed several productions in Canada for the Arts Club Theatre Company and Sheridan College. Garcia died on December 17, 2024. At the time of his death, Garcia was preparing for his Stratford Festival debut as director of Dirty Rotten Scoundrels.
