= Chemrez =

Manufacturer in the Philippines

Chemrez Technologies
- Formerly: Concepcion Air Conditioning Corporation
- Company type: Public
- Traded as: PSE: SPH
- Industry: Chemicals
- Founded: Apr 17, 1989
- Headquarters: Bagumbayan, Quezon City, Metro Manila
- Area served: Philippines
- Key people: Filemon T. Berba, Jr. (Chairman); Leon L. Lao (President & CEO); John L. Lao (EVP); Dean A. Lao (Managing Director)

Chemrez Technologies, Inc. (PSE: COAT) is a manufacturer of powder coatings based in the Philippines. It has been listed on the Philippine Stock Exchange since December 8, 2000 and is a member of the D&L Group of Companies.

On June 9, 2006, shareholders of Corro-Coat, Inc. approved the purchase of Chemrez, Inc. and its biodiesel project. Corro-Coat will conduct a public offering late in 2006 to raise funds for the transaction.

At the same meeting, shareholders also approved the change in company name to "Chemrez Technologies, Inc." to reflect the predominant contribution of the goodwill of the Chemrez name and its business units in the combined entity.

== See also ==
- Jotun (company)
