= John Guleserian =

American cinematographer

- Born: Chicago, Illinois, U.S.
- Years active: 2002–present
- Spouse: Theresa Avram Guleserian (m. 2010)
- Children: 1

John Guleserian (/ˌɡʊləˈsɛriən/;) is an American cinematographer.

== Early life ==
Guleserian aspired to be a filmmaker from a young age. He worked as an ice cream truck driver before studying cinematography at college, first as an undergraduate at Columbia College Chicago and then graduate school at the AFI Conservatory. While studying, he spent his spare time "shooting short films for any director that would let me" to gain experience.

== Career ==
Guleserian began a longstanding collaboration with writer–director Drake Doremus at AFI, which both men attended at the same time. In 2006, he photographed Doremus's thesis project, and they paired up again to shoot numerous commercials and music videos in addition to the 2009 feature film Spooner. They later collaborated on Like Crazy, a romantic drama film that premiered at the 2011 Sundance Film Festival and won the festival's Grand Jury Prize, an achievement that Guleserian later said "opened up a lot of opportunities" for him. One such opportunity was the 2013 romantic comedy About Time, which was the first big-budget studio film Guleserian worked on; previously, he had only shot independent films with smaller budgets. The same year, he returned to work with Doremus as cinematographer on Breathe In, starring Felicity Jones and Guy Pearce. Since Doremus's films are largely improvised, Guleserian filmed these projects unconventionally, with mostly handheld camerawork in takes that usually last over ten minutes.

Guleserian's television credits include I Heart Vampires and Tim and Eric Awesome Show, Great Job!, and he was the director of photography on the 2014 films Parts per Billion, Song One and Before We Go. He shot the 2015 film Equals, a science fiction romance directed by Doremus and starring Kristen Stewart and Nicholas Hoult. He also filmed the 2015 sex comedy The Overnight, a project he became involved in because of his wife, a production designer hired to work on the film, who introduced Guleserian to the director, Patrick Brice.

In December 2014 he was named one of Complex magazine's "Underrated Cinematographers Poised to Make It Big in 2015". He has expressed an interest in working as a visual consultant on animated films.

== Filmography ==
=== Feature film ===
Year	Title	Director	Notes
2009	Spooner	Drake Doremus	
2009	ZMD: Zombies of Mass Destruction	Kevin Hamedani	
2011	Like Crazy	Drake Doremus	
2013	Breathe In	Drake Doremus	
2013	About Time	Richard Curtis	
2014	Song One	Kate Barker-Froyland	
2014	Kiss Me	Jeff Probst	
2014	Parts per Billion	Brian Horiuchi	
2014	Before We Go	Chris Evans	
2015	The Overnight	Patrick Brice	
2015	Equals	Drake Doremus	
2018	Love, Simon	Greg Berlanti	
2018	Zoe	Drake Doremus	
2018	Trial by Fire	Edward Zwick	
2020	An American Pickle	Brandon Trost	
2020	Happiest Season	Clea DuVall	
2021	He's All That	Mark Waters	
2021	Candyman	Nia DaCosta	
2023	Cocaine Bear	Elizabeth Banks	
2023	Genie	Sam Boyd	
2025	You're Cordially Invited	Nicholas Stoller	
TBA	Judgment Day	Nicholas Stoller	
TBA	The 99'ers	Nicole Kassell	

=== Television ===
Year	Title	Director	Notes
2006	Orastories	Annie Mebane; Lindsay Stidham	TV short
2007–2009	Tim and Eric Awesome Show, Great Job!	Tim Heidecker; Eric Wareheim; Jonathan Krisel	29 episodes
2015	Transparent	Silas Howard; Jim Frohna	Episodes "Bulnerable" and "The Book of Life"
2015–2016	Casual		23 episodes
2017	Friends from College	Nicholas Stoller; Andrew Gurland; Francesca Delbanco	All 16 episodes
2020	Homemade	Kristen Stewart	Episode "Crickets"
2023-2025	Platonic	Nicholas Stoller; Francesca Delbanco	20 episodes
