= Zoe (2018 film) =

2018 American science fiction film

- Official release poster
- Directed by: Drake Doremus
- Screenplay by: Richard Greenberg
- Story by: Richard Greenberg; Drake Doremus
- Produced by: Drake Doremus; Robert George; Michael Pruss
- Starring: Ewan McGregor; Léa Seydoux; Christina Aguilera; Miranda Otto; Rashida Jones
- Cinematography: John Guleserian
- Edited by: Douglas Crise
- Music by: Dan Romer
- Production companies: Global Road Entertainment; He Li Chen Guang Media; Scott Free Productions
- Distributed by: Amazon Studios
- Release dates: April 21, 2018 (Tribeca Film Festival); July 20, 2018 (United States)
- Running time: 104 minutes
- Country: United States
- Language: English
- Box office: $401,912

Zoe is a 2018 American romantic science fiction film directed by Drake Doremus and starring Ewan McGregor, Léa Seydoux, Christina Aguilera, Rashida Jones, and Miranda Otto.

The film had its world premiere at the Tribeca Film Festival on April 21, 2018. It was released on July 20, 2018, by Amazon Studios.

== Plot ==
In the not-too-distant future, the most cutting-edge technology has honed romantic relationships down to a science: A computerized test can determine the likelihood of successful partnership between two individuals, and androids—known as “synthetics”—have been designed as the ideal partners, ones who are completely understanding and will never leave. Zoe and Cole work in the research facility responsible for developing this technology. Zoe and Cole are friends but Zoe harbors a crush on him, and is disappointed when she takes the compatibility test and finds out they have a 0% compatibility. When she tells Cole this information, he gently tells her that she is a synthetic.

Synthetics had always been programmed to know they were synthetics, but Zoe was a new model and an experiment to see if a synthetic could pass as a human. Although Zoe has been implanted with false memories that she believed were her own, as in Blade Runner, it is clear that Zoe is special as she has developed her own feelings. Cole gently takes Zoe into the world with this new self-awareness, seeing her reactions, but also falling in love with her. He is wary of getting physical with her, but they eventually do. Zoe feels that Cole is holding back.

When Zoe is hit by a car, exposing her synthetic intestines, it causes Cole to pull away from Zoe after repairing her. Meanwhile, the AI company has shifted direction to releasing Benysol, a pill which gives the person taking it the feeling of being in love for several blissful hours. It is a huge success, with people going to Benysol clubs and even hanging out in certain parks to meet partners they take it with. Cole and Zoe clearly miss each other, but they both take Benysol with multiple partners, which only leaves them feeling empty. Cole's friends encourage him to be with Zoe, even though she is synthetic, but he cannot do it. One day Zoe visits the AI lab and discovers a room full of Zoes, the next generation of her, Zoe 2.0. She realizes that she does not wish to live without Cole and visits the brothel where she asks the owner to shut her down. However, at the last minute she changes her mind and some of the brothel girls take her to her apartment, where Cole finds her and professes his love. She cries, which her model was not supposed to be able to do.

== Cast ==
- Ewan McGregor as Cole
- Léa Seydoux as Zoe
- Christina Aguilera as Jewels
- Theo James as Ash
- Rashida Jones as Emma
- Miranda Otto as The Designer
- Matthew Gray Gubler as Michael

== Production ==
On August 19, 2016, it was announced that Charlie Hunnam and Léa Seydoux would star in the untitled sci-fi romance film, which Drake Doremus would direct from a script by Rich Greenberg who collaborated with Doremus on the Emmy winning web series The Beauty Inside. On October 25, 2016, Stuart Ford's IM Global came on board to fully finance the film, titled Zoe, with Scott Free Productions' Michael Pruss producing along with Doremus and Robert George. By May 2017, Ewan McGregor replaced Hunnam in the film, a supporting cast of Christina Aguilera, Theo James, Rashida Jones, Miranda Otto and Matthew Gray Gubler were added, and a filming start date of May 8 was established, with the filming taking place in Montreal.

== Release ==
The film had its world premiere at the Tribeca Film Festival on April 21, 2018. Prior to the premiere, Amazon Studios acquired distribution rights to the film in the United States, Canada, the United Kingdom, the Republic of Ireland, Italy, Australia and New Zealand, while Netflix acquired distribution rights to release the film as a Netflix Original film in Japan and the Benelux. IM Global merged with Open Road Films (who previously co-released Gleason with Amazon) to form Global Road Entertainment.

The film was released on July 20, 2018.

== Reception ==
On review aggregator website Rotten Tomatoes, the film holds an approval rating of 32%, based on 25 reviews, and an average rating of 4.3/10. Its consensus states "Zoe has some interesting ideas but never manages to get a satisfying grip on them, settling for slow-moving sci-fi that ultimately fails to engage." On Metacritic, the film has a weighted average score of 39 out of 100, based on 10 critics, indicating "generally unfavorable reviews". Morgan Rojas of Cinemacy believed that "the performances from McGregor and Seydoux are equally raw and vulnerable", and that Aguilera added a "star power" to the film. Common Sense Media editor Andrea Beach praised the movie for the two leading performances and additional work by "talented supporters—Rashida Jones, Miranda Otto, and Christina Aguilera".
