= Endings, Beginnings =

2019 romantic drama film by Drake Doremus

- Film poster
- Directed by: Drake Doremus
- Written by: Jardine Libaire; Drake Doremus
- Produced by: Francis Chung; Robert George; Drake Doremus; Jeong Tae-sung
- Starring: Shailene Woodley; Jamie Dornan; Sebastian Stan; Matthew Gray Gubler
- Cinematography: Marianne Bakke
- Edited by: Garret Price
- Music by: Philip Ekstrom
- Production companies: CJ Entertainment; Protagonist Pictures
- Distributed by: Samuel Goldwyn Films (United States); Smile Ent. (South Korea)
- Release dates: September 8, 2019 (TIFF); April 17, 2020 (United States); June 24, 2020 (South Korea)
- Running time: 110 minutes
- Countries: South Korea; United States
- Language: English
- Box office: $239,231

Endings, Beginnings is a 2019 romantic drama film, directed by Drake Doremus, from a screenplay he wrote alongside Jardine Libaire. The film is semi-improvised and loosely based on the screenplay. It stars Shailene Woodley, Jamie Dornan, Sebastian Stan and Matthew Gray Gubler.

30-something Daphne, recently single after ending a long-term, dead-end relationship, explores new possibilities over the next year, reaching a new chapter in her life.

It had its world premiere at the Toronto International Film Festival on September 8, 2019. It was released on April 17, 2020, by Samuel Goldwyn Films.

== Plot ==
30-something Daphne, reeling from a recent break up with Adrian, moves into her sister Billie's poolhouse and quits her job. Following advice from a friend, she decides to take a six-month sabbatical from alcohol and men as she feels she lost four years with him.

Visiting her mother Sue at Christmas, Daphne and she are obviously estranged. She has a European partner named Karl and does not keep up-to-date with her daughters' lives. When Daphne tells Sue about the break up she has no sympathy, and gifts her her wedding ring.

At Billie's New Years party, Daphne meets Frank and Jack. Both flirt with her, but they are very different. Frank is a free-spirited bad boy, unpredictable, and always ready for adventure; Jack is a sober, intelligent, sensitive, writer and academic.

Daphne and Jack go out and talk for hours. Frank contacts her, insisting on meeting. He is jealous, as his friend Jack has been talking about her. Not only does Frank ply her with alcohol, but he seduces her. By the next day, Daphne insists he not use her as the wedge in his friendship with Jack.

Returning home with her niece, Daphne witnesses her sister and her brother-in-law fighting, which only exacerbates the once-idealistic Daphne's growing despair regarding long-term love. She takes the ring her mother gave her to pawn it, as it was originally from a bigamist father. Daphne gets a message from Jed, her former boss, apologizing for having sex with her (which likely caused her break-up with Adrian and quitting her job).

Unable to choose between Jack and Frank, these almost polar opposites, Daphne finds herself bouncing between them instead. She enjoys the distinct ways each man sees her, as if she is trying out different versions of herself to see the kind of life that might be waiting for her. With Jack, Daphne is more domesticated, practically living together, watching movies at home and having long talks. Simultaneously, she texts with Frank.

Daphne, after having moved to her own place which does not allow pets, gets a surprise visit from Frank while Jack is away. Saying he is going away and cannot take Jack's dog, he dumps it on her. Moments later Frank returns, and they have another passionate encounter.

Frank and Daphne end up spending the weekend together, doing a road trip up north. They go to a house party with friends he does not share with Jack. Arriving two hours late to her sister's baby shower, several women gossip about Daphne behind her back.

Jack returns and he and Daphne resume their relationship. Going out dancing one night, when she sees Jed, she suggests they go, but does not say why. Weeks later, as she has felt nauseous in the mornings, Daphne takes a home pregnancy test. After going to a gynecologist to confirm, she gives Jack the news that she is pregnant.

Although when they had first met Jack had said he did not want kids, he is overjoyed. However, when Daphne confesses the baby could be Frank's, he is upset so asks her to leave. Once they have some time to think, she meets with Jack and she explains she is going to own her actions. While he is happy for Daphne, he cannot get beyond the sense of betrayal.

Sue and Karl marry, and at the reception, Daphne and her mother clash. Speaking alone, Sue explains that her seemingly flitting from man to man as her daughters grew, was in the hope of achieving stability for them. However, she never found the right fit.

Daphne finally contacts human resources at her old job to explain she had left so suddenly because of her boss Jeb's inappropriate behavior. Out shopping at five 1/2 months pregnant, she runs into Frank after not seeing him since the weekend they spent together. He is surprised to see her bump, so she explains she tried to reach him but he no longer is friends with Jack.

Frank sends a message to Daphne so they can meet up. Although slightly taken aback, he says he wants to be a dad. Later Daphne and Sue see each other, making peace. She even gets an encouraging message from Adrian.

== Cast ==
- Shailene Woodley as Daphne, Billie's sister, Adrian's ex-girlfriend, Sue's daughter and a thirty-something woman navigating love and heartbreak over the course of one year
- Jamie Dornan as Jack, an Irish writer, Daphne's boyfriend
- Sebastian Stan as Frank, Daphne's other boyfriend
- Matthew Gray Gubler as Adrian, Daphne's ex-boyfriend
- Lindsay Sloane as Billie, the foil sister of Daphne and Sue's daughter, who is the financial shoulder for Daphne to lean on, and is married with a baby on the way
- Ben Esler as Jed
- Shamier Anderson as Jonathan
- Noureen DeWulf as Noureen
- Wendie Malick as Sue, Daphne and Billie's mother
- Kyra Sedgwick as Ingrid
- Sherry Cola as Chris
- Jonathan Freeman as Graham
- Kai Lennox as Fred

== Production ==
It was announced in October 2018 that filming had begun on Drake Doremus’s next film project, which he co-wrote with author Jardine Libaire in Los Angeles. Shailene Woodley, Jamie Dornan, Sebastian Stan, Matthew Gray Gubler, Lindsay Sloane and Shamier Anderson were set to star. In November 2018, Sherry Cola joined the cast of the film.

== Release ==
The film had its world premiere at the Toronto International Film Festival on September 8, 2019. Shortly after, Samuel Goldwyn Films acquired distribution rights to the film. It was originally scheduled to be released in theaters on May 1, 2020. On March 26, 2020, the COVID-19 pandemic led to the film being brought forward and released digitally on April 17, 2020.

== Reception ==
Endings, Beginnings holds a 45% approval rating on review aggregator website Rotten Tomatoes, based on 74 reviews, with an average of 5.2/10. The site's critical consensus reads: "Endings, Beginnings smothers its talented ensemble cast's committed work in a carelessly constructed, aimlessly dawdling story." On Metacritic, the film holds a rating of 42 out of 100, based on 18 critics, indicating "mixed or average" reviews.

Peter DeBruge of Variety gave the film a negative review, writing: "Doremus tells his story in snippets, jump-cutting between grubby handheld footage of Daphne's life shot from with her face all or partially obscured. The film traps us outside her head, never really allowing us inside it." David Rooney of The Hollywood Reporter also gave the film a negative review, writing: "The movie aims to make Daphne's journey raw and real, but mostly it's just insipid." Jeanette Catsoulis of The New York Times gave the film a positive review, writing: "The writing might be a tangle of limp clichés, but the actors - especially Woodley and the terrific Wendie Malick as Daphne's mother - sweat to sell every line." Pete Hammond of Deadline Hollywood also gave the film a positive review, writing: "Shailene Woodley, Jamie Dornan, and Sebastian Stan enliven and enrich this film of three 30-somethings caught up in a love triangle."
