= The Beauty Inside =

The Beauty Inside may refer to the following:

- The Beauty Inside (web series), a six-episode social film from Intel and Toshiba
- The Beauty Inside (2015 film), a South Korean adaption of the film
- The Beauty Inside (TV series), a 2018 South Korean television series
