= Ben York Jones =

American screenwriter and film actor (born 1984)

- Born: February 11, 1984 (age 42); Englewood, New Jersey, United States
- Occupations: Screenwriter, film actor
- Agent: Paradigm

Ben York Jones (born February 11, 1984) is an American screenwriter and film actor best known for writing and co-starring in Like Crazy (2011) which won the Dramatic Grand Jury Prize at the 2011 Sundance Film Festival.

== Early life and career ==
Though born on the east coast, Jones grew up in Orange County, California. He attended Woodbridge High School in Irvine, California and graduated with a BFA in Film Production from Chapman University in 2006.

In 2010, the feature film Douchebag premiered in Dramatic Competition at the Sundance Film Festival. Jones starred in and co-wrote the film, though he was given an associate producer credit in lieu of a writing credit. Following the film's premiere, Jones and long time friend Drake Doremus began conceiving Like Crazy. Both he and Doremus had been through similar long-distance relationships, which served to inform the film's plot.

Following Like Crazy, Jones co-wrote the film Breathe In which premiered at the 2013 Sundance Film Festival. In the summer of 2016, production wrapped on Jones' adapted screenplay entitled Ashes in the Snow. The film is based on Ruta Sepetys' New York Times Bestseller Between Shades of Gray. Jones changed the title to avoid any possible confusion with the vastly dissimilar Fifty Shades of Grey franchise.

In 2017, Jones wrote Newness, directed by Doremus, which had its world premiere at the Sundance Film Festival.

February 2026, signed with Paradigm.

== Filmography ==
Year	Title	Role	Notes
2010	Douchebag	Tom Nussbaum	Associate Producer
2011	Like Crazy	Ross	Written by
2012	The Beauty Inside	Alex #1	
2012	Safety	Morgan	Short
2013	Hollywood & Vines		Short; Written by
2013	Breathe In		Written by
2017	Ashes in the Snow		Screenplay by
2017	Newness		Writer, producer
2018	Everything Sucks!	Mr. Stargrove	Creator, writer, producer, actor
