= Michael Pruss =

British film producer

Michael Pruss is a British film producer. He works for Scott Free Productions.

== Filmography ==
- Breathe In (2013)
- Equals (2015)
- Newness (2017)
- Zoe (2018)
- American Woman (2018)
- Our Friend (2019)
- Earthquake Bird (2019)
- Boston Strangler (2023)
- Napoleon (2023)
- A Sacrifice (2024)
- Alien: Romulus (2024)
- Gladiator II (2024)
- The Chronology of Water (2025)
- The Dog Stars (2026)
- Nightwatching (TBA) filming
