= Jonathan Schwartz (producer) =

American film producer, screenwriter (born 1969/70)

- Education: University of California, Berkeley (B.A.); George Washington University Law School (J.D.)
- Occupation: Film producer

Jonathan Schwartz (born 1969/1970) is an American film producer and former entertainment lawyer, known for producing independent features. Schwartz's credits include Wristcutters: A Love Story (2006), Douchebag (2010), Like Crazy (2011), Smashed (2012), Nobody Walks (2012), Breathe In (2013), Imperial Dreams (2014), and The Vanishing of Sidney Hall (2017). Through his production label, Super Crispy Entertainment, most of Schwartz's works have screened, won awards and secured distribution at the Sundance Film Festival. Throughout his career, he has collaborated extensively with producer Andrea Sperling, director Drake Doremus and actor-producer Logan Lerman.

== Early life and education ==
A Los Angeles native, Jonathan Schwartz attended University of California, Berkeley, where he received his degree in rhetoric. He attended George Washington University Law School, where he graduated with a Juris Doctor. He was subsequently involved in the sports business by working as a sports researcher for companies like HBO and NBC Sports, which led him to become acquainted with Minnesota Vikings owners Zygi and Audrey Wilf. He moved back to Los Angeles and became a junior lawyer for the ICM Partners talent and literary agency. Schwartz subsequently worked for Real World Studios, answering to English singer-songwriter and cinemaphile Peter Gabriel.

== Career ==
Schwartz founded his film production company, Crispy Films, in 2004. Utilizing his connections established through his career at HBO, NBC, ICM and Real World Studios, Schwartz managed to establish a number of major studio projects, including an adaptation of Thomas Hauser's novel Mark Twain Remembers, with James Franco attached to star. However, said production fell into a state of development hell, prompting Schwartz to pursue smaller, independent productions. The studio's breakthrough came with Wristcutters: A Love Story, a black comedy road movie that premiered at the 2006 Sundance Film Festival. In 2007, Schwartz co-produced Funny Games, an American remake of the 1997 Austrian psychological thriller of the same name.

In 2008, Schwartz was introduced to a number of his future long-term collaborators, including fellow film producer Andrea Sperling, following the recommendation of a sales agent with Creative Artists Agency. Schwartz and Sperling became producing partners and Crispy Films was subsequently renamed Super Crispy Entertainment, with the Wilfs financing their projects. That same year, an agent also arranged for Schwartz to be introduced at a Starbucks coffee shop to the up and coming director Drake Doremus. Schwartz's next two projects included Doremus' comedy-drama films Spooner, which premiered at the Slamdance Film Festival in 2009, as well as Douchebag, which premiered at the 2010 Sundance Film Festival. Schwartz and Sperling executive produced the science fiction mystery fantasy comedy film Kaboom, which premiered at the 2010 Cannes Film Festival and was awarded the first Queer Palm award.

Schwartz collaborated again with Sperling as his producing partner and Doremus as director on the film Like Crazy, which premiered at the 2011 Sundance Film Festival. The film won the festival's Grand Jury Prize and helped launch the careers of Felicity Jones and Jennifer Lawrence. At the 2012 Sundance Film Festival, Schwartz and Sperling were awarded the U.S. Dramatic Special Jury Prize for Excellence in Independent Film Producing. The final collaboration to date between Schwartz and Doremus was Breathe In, which premiered at the 2013 Sundance Film Festival and subsequently released by the Cohen Media Group.

Jonathan Schwartz and Andrea Sperling partnered up with Greg Ammon to produce the drama Bleeding Heart, starring Jessica Biel and Zosia Mamet, which was shot in late 2013. It premiered at the Tribeca Film Festival two years later, resulting in it being acquired and released by Gravitas Ventures. At the 2014 Sundance Film Festival, Schwartz premiered the crime-drama Imperial Dreams, directed by Malik Vitthal and starring John Boyega - which led the actor to be cast as Finn in the Star Wars sequel trilogy. At South by Southwest three months later, the next film produced by Schwartz, the Portland-based drama All the Wilderness premiered, featuring Danny DeVito, having been supported during development by Glenn Howerton and the other leads of It's Always Sunny in Philadelphia. The film was acquired and released by Screen Media Films the following year. Schwartz collaborated with Oscar-winning writer & director Shawn Christensen, to produce The Vanishing of Sidney Hall, which premiered at the 2017 Sundance Film Festival and was distributed by A24 in 2018.

Schwartz partnered with Logan Lerman, the lead actor and executive producer of The Vanishing of Sidney Hall, to produce reportedly numerous subsequent films. The partnership began with Press Play, written and directed by Greg Björkman, which was released in June 2022. In June 2023, Schwartz and Lerman were announced as producers alongside Andrea Iervolino & Monika Bacardi on the Hollywood thriller Skincare, directed by Austin Peters.

== Filmography ==
- The King of Utah (2004 - short) (producer/writer)
- Wristcutters: A Love Story (2006) (executive producer)
- Funny Games (2007) (co-producer)
- Spooner (2009) (producer/writer/actor)
- Douchebag (2010) (producer/writer)
- Kaboom (2010) (executive producer)
- The Way Back (2010) (executive producer)
- Like Crazy (2011) (producer)
- Smashed (2012) (producer)
- Nobody Walks (2012) (producer)
- Breathe In (2013) (producer)
- Imperial Dreams (2014) (producer)
- All the Wilderness (2014) (producer)
- Bleeding Heart (2015) (producer)
- The Vanishing of Sidney Hall (2017) (producer)
- Rosy (2018) (producer)
- Ashes in the Snow (2018) (executive producer)
- Press Play (2022) (producer)
- Skincare (2024) (producer)
