= Michael Schaefer (producer) =

German film producer

- Occupation: Film producer
- Years active: 1998–present

Michael Schaefer is a German film producer best known for the 2015 film The Martian.

== Career ==
In July 2012, after leaving Summit Entertainment, Schaefer was hired as the president of Ridley Scott's company, Scott Free Productions.

In 2015, Schaefer produced the science fiction film The Martian starring Matt Damon, which Scott directed. He received an Academy Award nomination for the film for Best Picture at the 88th Academy Awards along with Simon Kinberg, Scott, and Mark Huffam.

In October 2016, it was announced that Schaefer would be leaving Scott Free to become president at Arnon Milchan's New Regency. In October 2023, it was announced Schaefer would be departing New Regency after seven years with the company.

== Filmography ==
Producer

- Beefcake (1998) (assistant producer)
- Der Madendoktor (2001) (TV Movie)
- No Regrets (2001)
- Mouse (2001) (Short)
- Annie & Boo (2004) (Short)
- Winterreise (2006) (co-producer)
- Exodus: Gods and Kings (2014)
- Child 44 (2015)
- Equals (2015)
- The Martian (2015)
- Morgan (2016)
- Newness (2017)
- Alien: Covenant (2017)
- Murder on the Orient Express (2017)
- Blitz (2024)

Executive producer

- Now You See Me (2013)
- The Counselor (2013)
- Concussion (2015)
- Mark Felt: The Man Who Brought Down the White House (2017)
- The Lighthouse (2019)
- Ad Astra (2019)
- Everybody's Talking About Jamie (2021)
- Deep Water (2022)
- The Northman (2022)
- Barbarian (2022)
- Amsterdam (2022)
