= Drake Doremus =

American film director (born 1983)

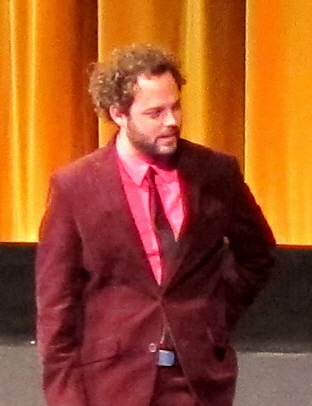
- Drake Doremus at the 2011 London Film Festival
- Born: March 29, 1983 (age 43); Orange, California
- Education: American Film Institute (MFA)
- Occupations: Film director, writer, producer

Drake Doremus (/dəˈriːməs/; born March 29, 1983) is an American film director, screenwriter and producer best known for directing the films Like Crazy (2011), which won the Grand Jury Prize Dramatic at the 2011 Sundance Film Festival, Douchebag (2010), which was in Dramatic competition at the 2010 Sundance Film Festival, and Equals (2015).

== Career ==
Doremus studied directing at the AFI Conservatory, being the youngest fellow ever accepted into the film school. At the recommendation of a talent agent in 2008, Doremus was introduced to producer Jonathan Schwartz, who would produce his subsequent four films.

His 2011 film Like Crazy has been described as loosely inspired by his real life experiences. It stars Anton Yelchin, Felicity Jones, and Jennifer Lawrence. Most of the dialogue in the film was improvised, with only a 50-page detailed outline as a script. The film was shot in a month on only a $250,000 budget, and won the Grand Jury Prize at the 2011 Sundance Film Festival.

In 2012, Doremus directed a six-part social film for Intel and Toshiba called The Beauty Inside. It was written by Richard Greenberg, and stars Mary Elizabeth Winstead and Topher Grace. The series earned him a Daytime Emmy for Outstanding New Approaches - Original Daytime Program or Series. In June 2013, his film Breathe In starring Felicity Jones, Guy Pearce, Amy Ryan, and Mackenzie Davis opened the Edinburgh International Film Festival EIFF. Doremus directed the 2015 science-fiction romantic drama film Equals, written by Nathan Parker based on a story by Doremus and starring Kristen Stewart, Nicholas Hoult, Guy Pearce, and Jacki Weaver.

In 2017, Doremus directed and produced the romantic drama Newness, which had its world premiere at the Sundance Film Festival. The film reunites Doremus with Nicholas Hoult, who starred in his previous film Equals. It also stars Laia Costa. He again forayed into science-fiction romance with Zoe, written by Richard Greenberg and released by Amazon Studios on July 20, 2018. It stars Léa Seydoux, Ewan McGregor, Theo James, Rashida Jones, Matthew Gray Gubler, Miranda Otto, and Christina Aguilera. Doremus directed the advertisement for Hugo Boss' "The Scent Private Accord" perfume, starring Jamie Dornan.

Doremus frequently collaborates with Ben York Jones, who co-wrote Like Crazy and Breathe In with Doremus and wrote Newness. York Jones produced Douchebag and Newness, and appeared as an actor in Spooner, Douchebag, Like Crazy, and The Beauty Inside. In addition, he received special thanks on Equals. Doremus is also a frequent collaborator with actor Matthew Gray Gubler, who has had roles in Newness, Zoe, and Endings, Beginnings.

=== Future work ===
It was announced that Doremus is teaming with Amazon to co-executive produce and direct a television series based on Jardine Libaire's book White Fur. Doremus is set to direct another romantic drama entitled Aurora, produced by CJ Entertainment. It was also announced that Doremus has signed a two-year deal with Paramount Television to develop new projects and direct existing projects.

== Personal life ==
Doremus' film Like Crazy was inspired by his own long-distance relationship and marriage. In an interview with IndieWire, he said:

I'm a divorcee. I got married to this woman to try and get her back, I went through the visa stuff, to try and get her back in the States ... I'd spent so much time here, visiting someone when I was in a long-distance relationship, so I was so familiar with what it feels like to be jet-lagged, and only be here for 5 days, and try to be romantic, and try to fit in the love, and try to relive what we were going through, while taking in a new city, and being nine hours ahead. That relationship was from 2001 to 2008. she was in the US from 2001-2004, so from 04-08 it was back and forth, four years of long distance.

Doremus lives in London and Los Angeles with his wife, artist Triana de Lamo Terry and daughter Tallulah.

== Filmography ==
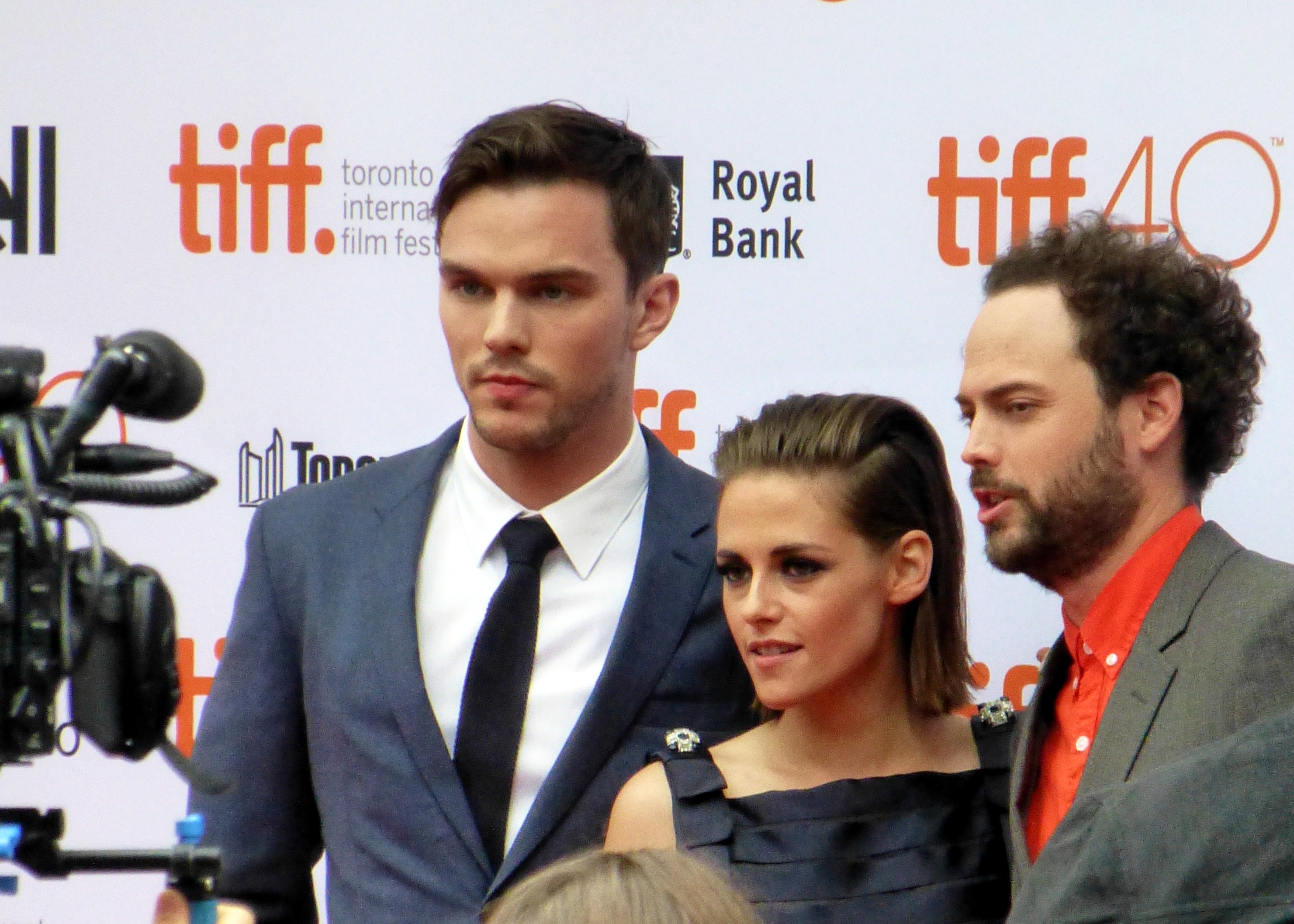
Doremus with Kristen Stewart and Nicholas Hoult at the premiere of Equals, 2015

=== Feature films ===
Year	Title	Director	Writer	Producer
2006	Moonpie	Yes	Yes	No
2008	Spooner	Yes	Story	No
2010	Douchebag	Yes	Yes	No
2011	Like Crazy	Yes	Yes	No
2013	Breathe In	Yes	Yes	No
2015	Equals	Yes	Story	No
2017	Newness	Yes	No	Yes
2018	Zoe	Yes	No	Yes
2019	Endings, Beginnings	Yes	Yes	Yes
2026	Next Life	Yes	Yes	Yes

=== Music videos ===
Year	Song	Artist	Notes
2009	"Ten Thousand Years"	Goddamn Electric Bill	Director/writer
2018	"Diabolo Menthe"	Soko	Director

== Awards and nominations ==
Year	Film	Association	Award	Result
2009	Spooner	Newport Beach Film Festival	Outstanding Achievement in Filmmaking	Won
2009	Spooner	Sonoma Valley Film Festival	Best Lounge Feature	Won
2010	Douchebag	Sundance Film Festival	Grand Jury Prize	Nominated
2011	Like Crazy	Sundance Film Festival	Grand Jury Prize	Won
2011	Like Crazy	Chicago Film Critics Association Awards	Most Promising Filmmaker	Nominated
2013	The Beauty Inside	Daytime Emmy Awards	Outstanding New Approaches - Original Daytime Program or Series	Won
2013	Breathe In	AFI Fest	Audience Award	Nominated
2013	Breathe In	Chicago International Film Festival	Audience Choice Award	Nominated
2013	Breathe In	Deauville Film Festival	Grand Special Prize	Nominated
2015	Equals	Venice Film Festival	Soundtrack Stars Award	Won
2015	Equals	Venice Film Festival	Golden Lion	Nominated
2015	Equals	Venice Film Festival	Green Drop Award	Nominated
2016	Equals	Jameson CineFest - Miskolc International Film Festival	International Ecumenical Award	Nominated
2016	Equals	Cleveland International Film Festival	Best American Independent Feature Film	Nominated
