= Nobody Walks =

- Official film poster
- Directed by: Ry Russo-Young
- Written by: Lena Dunham; Ry Russo-Young
- Produced by: Jonathan Schwartz; Andrea Sperling; Alicia Van Couvering
- Starring: John Krasinski; Olivia Thirlby; Rosemarie DeWitt; Jane Levy
- Cinematography: Christopher Blauvelt
- Edited by: John Walter
- Production company: Super Crispy Entertainment
- Distributed by: Magnolia Pictures
- Release dates: January 22, 2012 (Sundance Film Festival); October 12, 2012 (United States)
- Running time: 83 minutes
- Country: United States
- Language: English
- Box office: $25,342

Nobody Walks is a 2012 American independent drama film directed by Ry Russo-Young. The film premiered in Competition at the 2012 Sundance Film Festival and won a special Jury Prize.

The film stars John Krasinski, Olivia Thirlby, Rosemarie DeWitt, India Ennenga, Jane Levy and Justin Kirk, and was co-written by Russo-Young and Lena Dunham.

Magnolia Pictures released the film on VOD September 6, 2012 and in theaters October 12, 2012.

== Plot ==
23-year-old Martine has just arrived in the Silver Lake area of Los Angeles when she moves into a wealthy family's pool house, and begins working to complete her art film. Meanwhile, Peter, a laid-back father of two, agrees to his wife's request to help their young guest complete the project. The more time Martine spends with her surrogate family, the more apparent it becomes no one will walk away from this situation unchanged.

== Reception ==
Rotten Tomatoes gives the film a score of 40% based on 40 reviews, with an average rating of 5.19/10. Roger Ebert awarded the film 2 out of 4 stars, remarking, "“Nobody Walks” proves to be unsatisfactory because it establishes a well-defined group of characters and shows them disrupted by the careless behavior of a tiresome young woman and two adults who allow themselves to be motivated in one way or another by her infectious libido."
