= Andrea Sperling =

American film producer (born 1968/1969)

- Born: 1968 or 1969 (age 56–57)
- Education: University of California, Santa Barbara (B.A. 1990)
- Occupation: Film producer
- Years active: 1992–present
- Style: New Queer Cinema
- Spouse: Jamie Babbit (divorced)
- Children: 2

Andrea Sperling (born c. 1968/69) is an American independent film producer based in Los Angeles. The films she has produced include Totally Fucked Up, But I'm a Cheerleader, D.E.B.S. and Itty Bitty Titty Committee and the Sundance Top Prize-winning Like Crazy.

== Early life and education ==
Sperling attended the University of California, Santa Barbara where she took classes under Gregg Araki. While enrolled, she interned during the summers at Avenue Pictures. She graduated in 1990 with a B.A. in Film History, Theory and Criticism.

== Career ==
Upon graduation, Sperling's former professor, Gregg Araki, asked her to work with him on The Living End. The duo would continue their partnership into Araki's next three movies — Totally Fucked Up, The Doom Generation, and Nowhere — which were collective dubbed the "Teen Apocalypse Trilogy". The trilogy has been characterized as "... teen alienation, hazy sexuality and aggression."

Sperling has been credited with helping to launch the New Queer Cinema movement with her films dating as far back as the 1990s. In 2008, Sperling was introduced to her long-term producing partner, Jonathan Schwartz of Crispy Films, following the recommendation of a sales agent with Creative Artists Agency. Sperling joined Crispy Films, which was subsequently renamed Super Crispy Entertainment.

In 2014, Sperling branched into television, working on the Golden Globe Award-winning series Transparent. She was elevated to executive producer in 2015.

== Awards and honors ==
She was inducted into the Academy of Motion Picture Arts and Sciences in 2014. Sperling was named as a member of the 2008 and 2015 Out100 class by Out.

== Personal life ==
Sperling is based in Los Angeles, California. She is a lesbian and was previously married to colleague, Jamie Babbit, with whom she has two children.

Sperling has sat on the board of directors of non-profit organization and film production company POWER UP and was with the organization from the beginning.

== Filmography ==
- 1993: Totally Fucked Up
- 1993: Terminal USA
- 1995: The Doom Generation
- 1996: A Small Domain (short)
- 1996: Color of a Brisk and Leaping Day
- 1997: Fame Whore
- 1997: Nowhere
- 1998: Freak Weather
- 1998: Desert Blue
- 1999: Sleeping Beauties (short)
- 1999: But I'm a Cheerleader
- 2001: Stuck (short)
- 2002: Pumpkin
- 2002: Scumrock
- 2003: D.E.B.S. (short)
- 2003: Hummer (short)
- 2004: D.E.B.S.
- 2004: A Memoir to My Former Self (short)
- 2005: Starcrossed
- 2005: Harsh Times
- 2005: The Quiet
- 2007: If I Had Known I Was a Genius
- 2007: Itty Bitty Titty Committee
- 2008: Adventures of Power
- 2010: Sympathy for Delicious
- 2010: Kaboom
- 2011: Like Crazy
- 2012: Breaking the Girls
- 2012: Smashed
- 2012: Nobody Walks
- 2013: Breathe In
- 2014: Imperial Dreams
- 2014: All the Wilderness
- 2015: Bleeding Heart
- 2017: Professor Marston & The Wonder Women
