= Bleeding Heart (film) =

- Theatrical release poster
- Directed by: Diane Bell
- Written by: Diane Bell
- Produced by: Jonathan Schwartz; Andrea Sperling; Greg Ammon
- Starring: Jessica Biel; Zosia Mamet; Joe Anderson; Edi Gathegi; Kate Burton; Harry Hamlin
- Cinematography: Zak Mulligan
- Edited by: John-Michael Powell
- Music by: Liam Howe
- Production companies: Super Crispy Entertainment; Fido Features
- Distributed by: Gravitas Ventures
- Release date: April 16, 2015 (Tribeca Film Festival)
- Running time: 87 minutes
- Country: United States
- Language: English

Bleeding Heart (originally titled Shiva & May) is a 2015 American drama film written and directed by Diane Bell and starring Jessica Biel, Zosia Mamet, Joe Anderson and Edi Gathegi. The film was produced by Jonathan Schwartz, Andrea Sperling, and Greg Ammon.

== Plot ==
May, a yoga instructor (Biel) makes contact with her younger half-sister Shiva (Mamet); the two share a mother, Susan, but were born ten years apart, with their mother giving May up for adoption to a rich family while Shiva bounced around foster homes. Despite their glaringly different backgrounds, the two bond quickly, although May is soon uncomfortable about Shiva's boyfriend Cody (Anderson). Dex, May's boyfriend and partner in their yoga school, is uncomfortable around Shiva when he learns about her true history, but May refuses to leave her sister, particularly when she finds that Shiva returned a thousand dollars that May had given her to pay for rent.

== Cast ==
- Zosia Mamet as Shiva
- Jessica Biel as May
- Joe Anderson as Cody
- Edi Gathegi as Dex
- Kate Burton as Martha
- Harry Hamlin as Ed (cameo)

== Production ==
On October 1, 2013, Diane Bell started casting for her new film. On October 7, Jessica Biel and Zosia Mamet were officially cast as long-lost sisters along with Kate Burton and Joe Anderson and it began shooting the same day. Edi Gathegi was cast a week later.

== Filming ==
Filming started in Los Angeles in October 2013.

== Release ==
The film premiered at the Tribeca Film Festival on April 16, 2015.

== Reception ==
=== Critical response ===
According to critic aggregation site Rotten Tomatoes, the film has a critic score of 43%. Frank Scheck of The Hollywood Reporter wrote: "Despite its non-exploitative approach to its subject, the film... is too schematic and obvious to have the desired impact. Content collapsed. Biel turns in a fine performance as the unlikely violent hero, but Mamet excels in a role far different than her Shoshanna on HBO's Girls."
