= Imperial Dreams =

2014 film directed by Malik Vitthal

- Official poster
- Directed by: Malik Vitthal
- Written by: Malik Vitthal; Ismet Prcic
- Produced by: Jonathan Schwartz; Andrea Sperling; Katherine Fairfax Wright
- Starring: John Boyega; Rotimi Akinosho; Keke Palmer; Glenn Plummer; De'Aundre Bonds
- Cinematography: Monika Lenczewska
- Edited by: Suzanne Spangler
- Music by: Flying Lotus
- Production company: Super Crispy Entertainment
- Distributed by: Netflix
- Release dates: January 20, 2014 (Sundance); February 3, 2017 (Netflix)
- Running time: 90 minutes
- Country: United States
- Language: English

Imperial Dreams is an American hood film written and directed by Malik Vitthal. The film had its world premiere at 2014 Sundance Film Festival on January 20, 2014. It won the Audience Award at the festival. The film was released as a Netflix original film on February 3, 2017 but removed in February 2023.

== Plot ==
A 21-year-old reformed gangster Bambi's devotion to his family, particularly his son Daytone, and his family's future are put to the test when he is released from prison and returns to his violent old stomping grounds in Watts, Los Angeles. Themes include mass incarceration, the importance of education, and the many obstacles present in the system that prevent those interested in rehabilitation from surviving when placed back in society.

== Cast ==
- John Boyega as Bambi
- Rotimi Akinosho as Wayne
- Keke Palmer as Samaara
- Glenn Plummer as Uncle Shrimp
- Kellita Smith as Tanya
- De'Aundre Bonds as Gideon
- Sufe Bradshaw as Detective Gill
- Jernard Burks as Cornell
- Nora Zehetner as Janine
- Anika Noni Rose as Miss Price
- Maximiliano Hernández as Detective Hernandez
- Ethan and Justin Coach as Daytone
- Todd Louiso as Peter Hall
- Sufe Bradshaw as Detective Gill
- Wilfred Lopez as Jail visitor
- Zilah Mendoza as Work Source Woman

== Production ==
The title Imperial Dreams references a point in the movie where the nature of emperors of the projects is expounded upon. It's also a reference to the housing projects where the movie takes place, Imperial Courts, in Watts.

== Reception ==
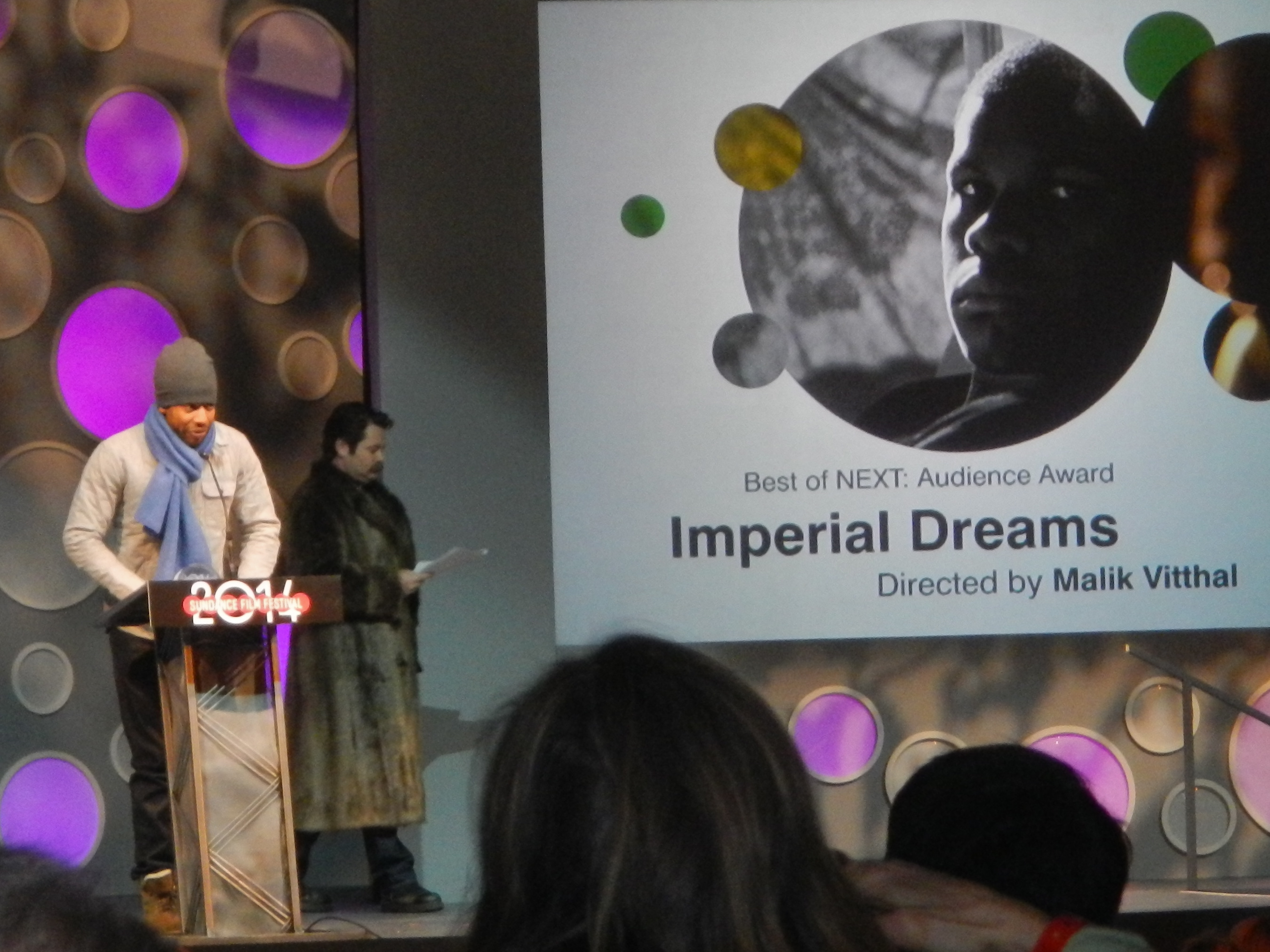
The film won the Audience Award: Best of NEXT at the 2014 Sundance Film Festival.

Imperial Dreams received positive reviews from critics. Review aggregator Rotten Tomatoes reports that 91% of 11 film critics have given the film a positive review, with an average rating of 7.3 out of 10.

Geoffrey Berkshire of Variety, in his review called the film "Bighearted yet surprisingly nuanced." Justin Lowe by his review for The Hollywood Reporter praised the film in calling it "An assured debut that stands to connect with a diverse audience." Chase Whale of Indiewire graded the film B+ by saying that "John Boyega first wowed audiences with his dynamite performance in Attack the Block. Once again playing the anti-hero, Imperial Dreams is another victory lap for this young actor, who's going to go on to do big, big things."

== See also ==
- List of hood films
