= Smashed (film) =

2012 film directed by James Ponsoldt

- Theatrical release poster
- Directed by: James Ponsoldt
- Written by: James Ponsoldt; Susan Burke
- Produced by: Jonathan Schwartz; Andrea Sperling; Jennifer Cochis
- Starring: Mary Elizabeth Winstead; Aaron Paul; Nick Offerman; Megan Mullally; Kyle Gallner; Mary Kay Place; Octavia Spencer
- Cinematography: Tobias Datum
- Edited by: Suzanne Spangler
- Music by: Eric D. Johnson; Andy Cabic
- Production company: Super Crispy Entertainment
- Distributed by: Sony Pictures Classics
- Release dates: January 22, 2012 (Sundance Film Festival); October 12, 2012 (United States)
- Running time: 81 minutes
- Country: United States
- Language: English
- Budget: $500,000
- Box office: $499,725

Smashed is a 2012 American drama film directed by James Ponsoldt, written by Ponsoldt and Susan Burke, and starring Mary Elizabeth Winstead and Aaron Paul. Winstead and Paul play a married couple, Kate and Charlie Hannah, both alcoholics. After a series of embarrassing incidents caused by her drinking habit, Kate decides to get sober with the help of a coworker and a sponsor from Alcoholics Anonymous.

The script was partly based on Burke's own experience of giving up alcohol at a young age, since she felt that her narrative had not yet been told on film. She and Ponsoldt wrote the script over six months, and the main roles were cast in September 2011. The film's US$500,000 budget was financed by independent investors including Minnesota Vikings owner Zygi Wilf. It was shot in Los Angeles in October 2011. It premiered at the 2012 Sundance Film Festival on January 22, 2012 and was released by Sony Pictures Classics on October 12, 2012. The film received positive reviews, with Winstead's performance receiving unanimous praise, and was nominated for several awards for her acting.

== Plot ==
Kate Hannah, an elementary school teacher, arrives at work hungover and vomits in front of her class. Asked by a student if she is pregnant, she pretends she is, then continues the lie to the school principal, Mrs. Barnes. Her co-worker Dave reveals that he knows she has been drinking and she makes him swear not to tell anyone.

Attending a party with her husband Charlie and his brother Owen, Kate drinks heavily. While leaving, she meets a woman who asks Kate for a ride. Kate is offered crack and the two get high together. The next morning, Kate wakes alone on the street. She finds her car and drives home, where Charlie acknowledges they both are alcoholics. They get intoxicated and have sex before Charlie passes out. Kate heads out alone to buy wine but is turned down by the cashier. She urinates on the floor because the bathroom door is locked, then steals a bottle of wine.

Waking up, Kate realizes she has passed out again. At work, Dave, a recovering alcoholic, invites her to an Alcoholics Anonymous (AA) meeting. There, she befriends Jenny, who has chosen a passion for food and cooking over alcohol. Kate decides to become sober and change her life. Dave drives Kate home, but bluntly makes an offensive comment which upsets her. When Kate and Charlie visit her estranged alcoholic mother, Rochelle, Kate mentions the AA meetings but Rochelle is skeptical; Kate's father left them after getting sober and now lives in another state with his "shiny new family".

Kate is surprised the next day when she is thrown a baby shower by her colleagues. She reconciles with Dave, putting his comments behind them. At home, Kate is angry when it becomes clear Charlie told Owen and his friend about Kate smoking crack. That night, she rebuffs Charlie's sexual advances. At school, Kate is questioned by a curious student as to why she is not gaining weight. She subsequently feigns a miscarriage and her students accuse her of having an abortion, for which she reprimands them.

Kate tells Charlie she feels she must confess to Mrs. Barnes the truth about her faked pregnancy. Charlie discourages her, warning that she will lose her job, and they begin to fight over financial issues. Kate lashes back that she would never depend on Charlie's parents' money and that she has struggled her whole life. Kate decides to tell Mrs. Barnes the truth and is fired. In a bar, she relapses. Jenny and Dave drive her home, where she starts an altercation with Charlie.

After some time, Kate speaks at an AA meeting, celebrating one year of sobriety, while Charlie gets in trouble for riding a bicycle while drunk. Kate visits Charlie and they play croquet. Charlie asks if she would move back in with him if he begins going to AA meetings. Kate says he must get sober for himself, not for her. Charlie then asks Kate to play another round, to give him a chance to redeem himself. The film ends before Kate gives her answer.

== Cast ==
- Mary Elizabeth Winstead as Kate Hannah
- Aaron Paul as Charlie Hannah
- Octavia Spencer as Jenny
- Nick Offerman as Dave Davies
- Megan Mullally as Principal Patricia Barnes
- Mary Kay Place as Rochelle
- Kyle Gallner as Owen Hannah
- Bree Turner as Freda
- Mackenzie Davis as Millie
- Richmond Arquette as Arlo
- Natalie Dreyfuss as Amber
- Brad Carter as Felix
- Lisa Yamada as Angela

== Production ==
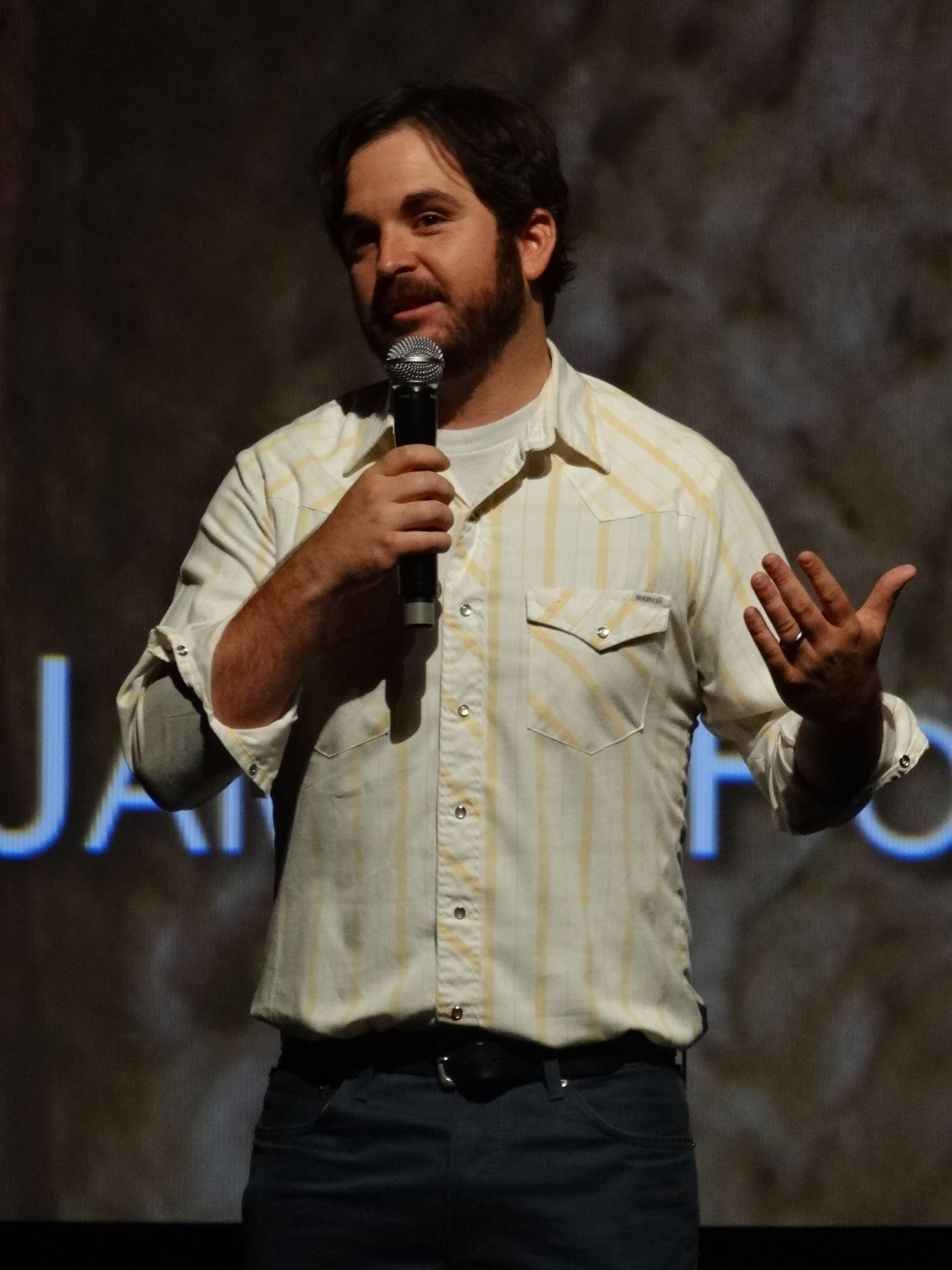
James Ponsoldt, who directed Smashed from a script he wrote with Susan Burke

Smashed was conceived by James Ponsoldt and Susan Burke after they had a conversation about things they had done while drunk. Some of the story's details were based on Burke's own experience; she was a heavy drinker until she was 24 years old, when she started attending Alcoholics Anonymous meetings. Burke felt that her experiences with alcoholism had not been represented on film before, and so she decided to write about a young woman deciding to become sober. Burke and Ponsoldt discussed the story, characters and tone in detail before they began to write the script. Since they lived on opposite sides of the United States, they communicated by email, dividing the script into 15-page installments which they wrote alternately. The entire writing process took six months.

Casting negotiations for the film's main roles—played by Mary Elizabeth Winstead, Aaron Paul, Octavia Spencer and Nick Offerman—took place in September 2011. To prepare for her role, Winstead talked with Burke about her recovery and attended a variety of AA meetings, where she spoke with other young women who had gotten sober. To act drunk, she used Ivana Chubbuck's method as described in her book The Power of the Actor. Paul said that in preparation for the film he recorded himself "getting severely intoxicated" and studied the footage. In order to build a rapport together, Winstead and Paul got drunk together the night before filming began, which Winstead described as being "very messy".

Smashed was filmed in Los Angeles over 19 days in October 2011. It was shot on a $500,000 budget, which was sourced by producers Jonathan Schwartz and Andrea Sperling of Super Crispy Entertainment from independent financiers, including Minnesota Vikings owner Zygi Wilf.

== Release ==
=== Box office ===
Smashed premiered at the Sundance Film Festival on January 22, 2012. It was also screened at the Deauville American Film Festival, the Toronto International Film Festival, the Athens Film Festival, Jameson CineFest, the Stockholm International Film Festival, and the Hamptons International Film Festival.

Sony Pictures Classics bought the film's distribution rights after its premiere at Sundance and gave it a limited release on October 12, 2012. On its opening weekend, the film grossed $26,943 from four theaters, averaging $6,736 per theater and ranking number 53 at the box office. The film earned $376,597 domestically from 13 weeks in release, with a widest release of 50 theaters. It earned $123,128 internationally for a total gross of $499,725.

=== Critical response ===
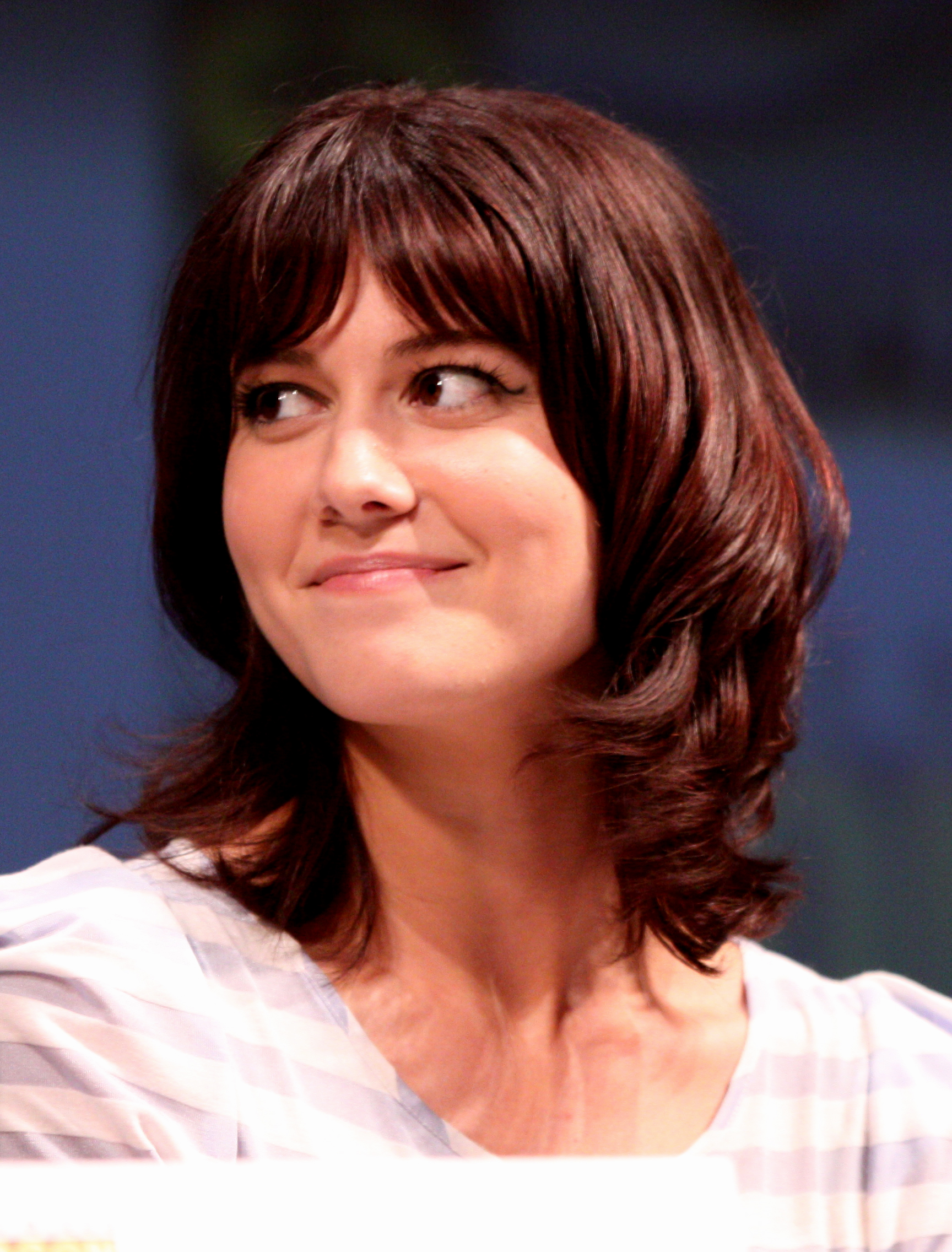
Mary Elizabeth Winstead was praised by many critics for her performance in the film

The film received generally positive reviews from critics. On Rotten Tomatoes, it holds a rating of 83% based on 107 reviews with an average score of 6.8 out of 10. The site's critical consensus reads, "Smashed resists the temptation to play up its serious subject matter for high theatrics, opting instead to let its gentle tone and Mary Elizabeth Winstead's marvelous performance carry the day." Metacritic gave the film a score of 71 out of 100, based on 32 reviews.

Variety critic Justin Chang commended Smashed for its "sheer emotional generosity" and Ponsoldt and Burke for their optimistic and sympathetic approach to the story. Stephen Holden of The New York Times praised the film's neutral and unsentimental tone and its "refus[al] to indulge a voyeuristic taste for ... sordid details". Similarly, Empire magazine's James White commended the film for avoiding clichés and condescension "by combining a light, frank, comic touch with real emotion and weighty, human performances by all those involved", and gave it 4 out of 5 stars. In a review for The Hollywood Reporter, Todd McCarthy praised Smashed for its emotional intimacy and realism.

Michael O'Sullivan, writing for The Washington Post gave the film 2 out of 4 stars, likening it to "a dramatic public service announcement" rather than an insightful narrative. Slant Magazine's Chris Cabin also opined that the story was underdeveloped and that the film "offers a cheap and easy sort of inspiration in lieu of genuine inquiry" into the recovery process of alcoholics. Marjorie Baumgarten of The Austin Chronicle did not find the film to be insightful, writing that the filmmakers were "preaching to the choir" with their portrayal of alcoholism and recovery.

Winstead received critical acclaim for her role. Film critic Roger Ebert, who gave the film 3.5 stars out of 4, wrote that she "is sort of wonderful in this movie, worn and warm" and commended her decision not to portray the character as a victim. Rolling Stone's Peter Travers described Winstead's performance as "unmissable and unforgettable", praising the comedy and intellect she simultaneously brought to the role. Mick LaSalle of the San Francisco Chronicle felt that Winstead was striking as Kate and speculated that Smashed would prove to be "the doorway to great things" in her career. Joe Williams from St. Louis Post-Dispatch gave the film 3 out of 4 stars and stated "There will never be another Marilyn Monroe or Elizabeth Taylor, but Hollywood may have found a new Lee Remick in Mary Elizabeth Winstead."

=== Accolades ===
When Smashed premiered at the Sundance Film Festival, Ponsoldt was nominated for the Grand Jury Prize in the Dramatic category, while producers Andrea Sperling and Jonathan Schwartz received a nomination for the Special Jury Prize for Excellence in Independent Film Producing. Winstead was nominated for the Independent Spirit Award for Best Female Lead. Octavia Spencer received a nomination for Outstanding Supporting Actress at the Black Reel Awards. For their work on the film, casting directors Avy Kaufman and Kim Coleman were nominated for a Casting Society of America Artios Award for a Low Budget Feature in the Comedy or Drama category.

== Soundtrack ==
A soundtrack to accompany the film was released digitally by Lakeshore Records on October 9, 2012. It features a mix of the film's original score, composed by Andy Cabic and Eric D. Johnson, as well as music from other artists heard throughout various portions of the film.

No.	Title	Artist	Length
1.	"Shower and a Beer"	Andy Cabic, Eric D. Johnson	1:46
2.	"I Want to See the Bright Lights Tonight"	Richard, Linda Thompson	3:08
3.	"Wake Up and Run"	Andy Cabic, Eric D. Johnson	1:04
4.	"Someone2Dance"	Bart Davenport	3:02
5.	"Highland Park Bike Ride"	Andy Cabic, Eric D. Johnson	1:30
6.	"Por Ti"	La Tentazion	2:57
7.	"Dreams-Come-True-Girl"	Cass McCombs	5:21
8.	"Lake Arrowhead"	Andy Cabic, Eric D. Johnson	0:33
9.	"When the Shelter Came"	Dark Meat	3:41
10.	"Santa's Village"	Andy Cabic, Eric D. Johnson	1:13
11.	"Planet of Women"	Sonny & The Sunsets	3:20
12.	"One More Game of Croquet"	Andy Cabic, Eric D. Johnson	1:41
13.	"Our Anniversary"	Smog	6:13

== See also ==
- Candy (2006 film)
