= Parts per Billion =

2014 American romantic drama

Parts Per Billion
- Preview Poster
- Directed by: Brian Horiuchi
- Screenplay by: Brian Horiuchi
- Produced by: Michael Benaroya; David Dickson; Molly Hassell; Jennifer Levine
- Starring: Frank Langella; Gena Rowlands; Rosario Dawson; Penn Badgley; Teresa Palmer; Josh Hartnett
- Cinematography: John Guleserian
- Edited by: Curtiss Clayton
- Music by: Mark Kilian
- Production companies: Benaroya Pictures; Interactor Media; PalmStar Entertainment; XYZ Films
- Distributed by: Millennium Entertainment
- Release date: March 25, 2014 (HKIFF)
- Running time: 98 minutes
- Country: United States
- Language: English
- Budget: $1.5 million

Parts per Billion is a 2013 American romantic drama written and directed by Brian Horiuchi. It stars an ensemble cast comprising Frank Langella, Gena Rowlands, Rosario Dawson, Penn Badgley, Teresa Palmer, and Josh Hartnett as three loosely connected couples who must deal with a looming biological attack.

== Plot ==
Erik, a struggling musician who lives off his family's considerable wealth, clashes with his girlfriend, Anna, over what they know are trivial details in their relationship. Apprehensive after watching news reports of increasing conflict in the Middle East, Anna comes to believe that they should spend more time together, but Erik seems preoccupied with music composition and maintaining friendly relations with his ex-girlfriends. At the same time, Len and Mia, a married couple, experience trouble in their own relationship. Len, a depressed and unemployed writer, struggles to find direction in his life. He confesses to his sister, a nurse named Sarah, that he has taken his wife, Mia, for granted until recently. Mia, an accomplished lawyer, has just successfully represented Andy, a scientist of some renown, from accusations of selling trade secrets to a research facility in the 1970s. Anna, worried about visions that she has had recently of a looming apocalypse that involve a young girl, confides in Rick, Len's best friend, that she fears she may be suffering from schizophrenia.

Andy, Erik's grandfather, insists that he take more money, but Erik refuses, as he wants to prove that he can make it on his own. Misunderstanding Erik's motives, Andy accuses Erik of being too good to take his money, as it was made through the production of biological weapons. Although Andy admits that he knew that the research was likely unethical, his wife, Esther, brushes off his guilt and says that the money kept their daughter alive long enough to give birth to Eric. Meanwhile, the situation in the Middle East worsens considerably. Biological weapons are at first rumored to have been deployed, then proven. Although the United States urges calm, Europe suffers massive casualties as trade winds blow the toxins westward. Andy, aware of the worst-case scenarios, urges Sarah to take appropriate precautions when she attends to him and his wife. Sarah in turn alerts Len, who takes Mia into their basement. As panic spreads through the country following loss of contact with the East Coast, Rick attempts to purchase a survival kit. When he comes up short of money, he grabs one and begs to be given a chance for survival; the owner shoots him as a looter.

Andy and Esther survive through the use of oxygen tanks. Esther, an optimist, believes that Erik and Anna have survived somehow, but Andy, a realist, insists that they must be dead. Flashbacks interspersed with Andy's and Esther's argument show Erik and Anna playfully flirting, having sex, and celebrating the news that Anna is pregnant. The flashbacks end with the apparent deaths of both Anna and Erik as they lie in bed. Andy and Esther set out to the local hospital to recover more oxygen tanks, where they discover Sarah's body. Discouraged, Esther begins to lose the will to live, but Andy encourages her with the knowledge that they have each other. At the same time, Len and Mia debate whether they should commit suicide together. Len is hurt by Mia's admission that she failed to discourage a coworker from falling in love with her, but he argues they have real chance to survive. Mia mocks Len's "Adam and Eve" scenario where they rebuild civilization, but Len begs her to stay with him; Mia tearfully pauses on the basement stairs. In the final scene, the young girl that Anna saw in her visions earlier is depicted finding Anna's ring and showing it to her mother.

== Cast ==
- Frank Langella as Andy
- Gena Rowlands as Esther
- Rosario Dawson as Mia
- Josh Hartnett as Len
- Teresa Palmer as Anna
- Penn Badgley as Erik
- Alexis Bledel as Sarah
- Hill Harper as Rick
- Stephen Sowan as Jabe
- Jon Prescott as Jay
- Matt Lockwood as Jon
- Conor Leslie as Des

== Production ==
In 2008, it was announced that Olivia Thirlby, Robert Pattinson and Dennis Hopper had been cast in the film, with shooting expected to begin within a month. However, conflicting shooting schedules with another film, The Twilight Saga: New Moon, forced Pattinson to drop out in early 2009. In November, a press release from the Michigan Film office revealed that the movie had been awarded incentives amounting to $295,766 in the form of state tax credits, by the state of Michigan and was expected to hire 73 Michigan workers. On December 12, 2012, AKA/Bow Street Films announced that Teresa Palmer, Penn Badgley, Hill Harper and Alexis Bledel had joined the cast. Shooting was scheduled to begin in Detroit and last all through Christmas. Also announced as cast members were Gena Rowlands, Frank Langella, Josh Hartnett, Molly Haskell, and Jennifer Levine. Joe Jenckes and Rosario executive produced.

== Release ==
On April 21, 2014 Millennium Entertainment acquired the US distribution rights to the film. It was released on video on demand on May 20, 2014, and on home video on June 6, 2014.

== Reception ==
Thomas Spurlin of DVD Talk rated it 2/5 stars and wrote that the film is too pessimistic and heavy-handed to properly address its philosophical themes. Bill Gibron of DVD Verdict wrote, "This lame, loosely knitted nonsense tries to bring the end of the world down to a human level and fails over and over again."
