= All the Wilderness =

2014 drama film directed by Michael Johnson

- Theatrical release poster
- Directed by: Michael Johnson
- Written by: Michael Johnson
- Produced by: Jonathan Schwartz; Andrea Sperling
- Starring: Kodi Smit-McPhee; Virginia Madsen; Isabelle Fuhrman; Evan Ross; Danny DeVito
- Cinematography: Adam Newport-Berra
- Edited by: John-Michael Powell
- Music by: Jónsi & Alex
- Production companies: Super Crispy Entertainment; Kamp Grizzly
- Distributed by: Screen Media Films
- Release dates: March 9, 2014 (South by Southwest); February 20, 2015 (United States)
- Running time: 85 minutes
- Country: United States
- Language: English

All the Wilderness (originally titled The Wilderness of James) is a 2014 American drama film written and directed by Michael Johnson. The film stars Kodi Smit-McPhee, Virginia Madsen, Isabelle Fuhrman, Evan Ross and Danny DeVito. The film was released on February 20, 2015, by Screen Media Films.

== Premise ==
James recently lost his father and is having trouble coping. He also seems obsessed with the death of people and animals. Because of this and other psychological problems, his mother sends him to Dr. Pembry; James does not want to go. He ends up making friends with street musician Harmon and spending his nights on the city streets.

== Cast ==
- Kodi Smit-McPhee as James Charm
- Virginia Madsen as Abigail Charm, James's widowed mother
- Isabelle Fuhrman as Val, James's love interest
- Evan Ross as Harmon, James's best friend
- Danny DeVito as Dr. Pembry, James's dean of students
- Hannah Barefoot as Crystal
- Pat Janowski as Carolyn
- Tabor Helton as William Charm, James's late father

== Production ==
Filming took place in Portland, Oregon.

== Release ==
The film premiered at South by Southwest on March 9, 2014. On November 4, 2014, Screen Media Films acquired distribution rights to the film. The film was released in the United States on February 20, 2015.

== Reception ==
On the review aggregator website Rotten Tomatoes, 63% of 24 critics' reviews are positive. Metacritic, which uses a weighted average, assigned the film a score of 54 out of 100, based on 11 critics, indicating "mixed or average" reviews.
