= Like Crazy =

2011 romantic drama film directed by Drake Doremus

- Theatrical release poster
- Directed by: Drake Doremus
- Written by: Drake Doremus; Ben York Jones
- Produced by: Jonathan Schwartz; Andrea Sperling
- Starring: Anton Yelchin; Felicity Jones; Jennifer Lawrence
- Cinematography: John Guleserian
- Edited by: Jonathan Alberts
- Music by: Dustin O'Halloran
- Production company: Super Crispy Entertainment
- Distributed by: Paramount Vantage; Indian Paintbrush
- Release dates: January 22, 2011 (Sundance); October 28, 2011 (United States)
- Running time: 90 minutes
- Country: United States
- Language: English
- Budget: $250,000
- Box office: $3.8 million

Like Crazy is a 2011 American romantic drama film directed by Drake Doremus and starring Anton Yelchin, Felicity Jones, and Jennifer Lawrence. Written by Doremus and Ben York Jones, the film tells the story of Anna (Jones), a British exchange student who falls in love with an American student, Jacob (Yelchin), only to be separated from him when she is denied reentry into the United States after staying in the country longer than her student visa allows.

Doremus based the storyline of the film partly on his own long-distance relationship with a woman living in London while he lived in Los Angeles. Rather than writing a traditional screenplay, he and Ben York Jones compiled a 50-page outline of the film from which the actors improvised almost all of the dialogue. Filming took place over four weeks in Los Angeles and London with a budget of $250,000.

Like Crazy premiered on January 22, 2011 at the Sundance Film Festival, where it won the festival's Grand Jury Prize. It was released in theaters on October 28, 2011 and grossed $3.9 million at the box office. Most reviews of the film were positive, with reviewers giving particular praise to the performances of Yelchin and Jones, although some found the plot implausible and contrived.

== Plot ==
Anna Gardner, a British exchange student attending college in Los Angeles, meets and falls in love with Jacob Helm, an American student who returns her affections. After graduation, Anna decides to spend the summer with Jacob rather than return to the United Kingdom, unaware of the consequences of overstaying her student visa, which expired upon her graduation. After returning to London for a family engagement, Anna flies back to Los Angeles, where she is detained, denied entry, and deported back to the United Kingdom by immigration officials.

Despite her efforts at appealing the immigration decision, Anna is told she is banned from entering the United States. The couple's love for each other grows strained by their separation and long-distance relationship. Jacob then leaves behind his successful design business and visits Anna in London for a few weeks after calling her one night. There, he learns that Anna's parents, Bernard and Jackie, have hired an immigration lawyer to try to get the ban lifted. Bernard suggests that marrying may help their efforts. Jacob is uncomfortable with the suggestion, and the couple struggle with their feelings.

After Jacob returns to the United States, he and Anna grow apart, and Jacob starts dating Samantha, a girl who's in love with him. Anna also tries to find a new life for herself, beginning work as a secretary for a magazine, but she is unable to abandon her feelings for Jacob. Later, while Jacob is talking to a customer, he accidentally tells "Anna" to get the phone, to which Samantha answers. Anna eventually calls Jacob from London, and both admit that they will never find in others what they found in each other and that they should marry. Jacob then breaks up with Samantha, returns to London, and marries Anna in a small registry office ceremony with her parents as witnesses — Jacob and Anna affirming that they will "never allow anything to destroy the feelings we share for each other". With a tearful parting, Jacob returns to his business in Los Angeles while the couple waits six months before they appeal the ban on Anna's visa.

Six months later, Jacob flies back to the United Kingdom for the appeal, but it is rejected. With their relationship compromised and no hope of resolving the visa issue, Anna and Jacob begin to fight with each other out of jealousy and frustration. Jacob flies back to the US and rekindles his relationship with Samantha while Anna starts dating Simon. Anna eventually gets promoted at work to the position of editor—something she had been working towards. Her love life, however, is not as positive or fulfilling—she realizes Simon does not evoke the same feelings in her as Jacob, whom she still misses.

Sometime later, Anna is finally offered a new visa. Anna invites her parents over for dinner to meet Simon, whom they end up not liking. Afterwards Simon proposes to Anna, to which she declines. She leaves her job, boyfriend, and apartment and flies to Los Angeles to Jacob, who greets her with flowers at the airport where they have an awkward reunion. Jacob brings Anna to his house where he joins her in the shower. As the water falls over them they remember happier memories they had together at the beginning of their relationship, which has now become strained due to their indiscretions during the time spent apart.

== Cast ==
- Anton Yelchin as Jacob Helm
- Felicity Jones as Anna Gardner
- Jennifer Lawrence as Samantha
- Charlie Bewley as Simon
- Alex Kingston as Jackie Gardner
- Oliver Muirhead as Bernard Gardner
- Chris Messina as Mike Appletree
- Finola Hughes as Liz
- Ben York Jones as Ross
- Jamie Thomas King as Elliot
- Keeley Hazell as Sabrina

== Production ==
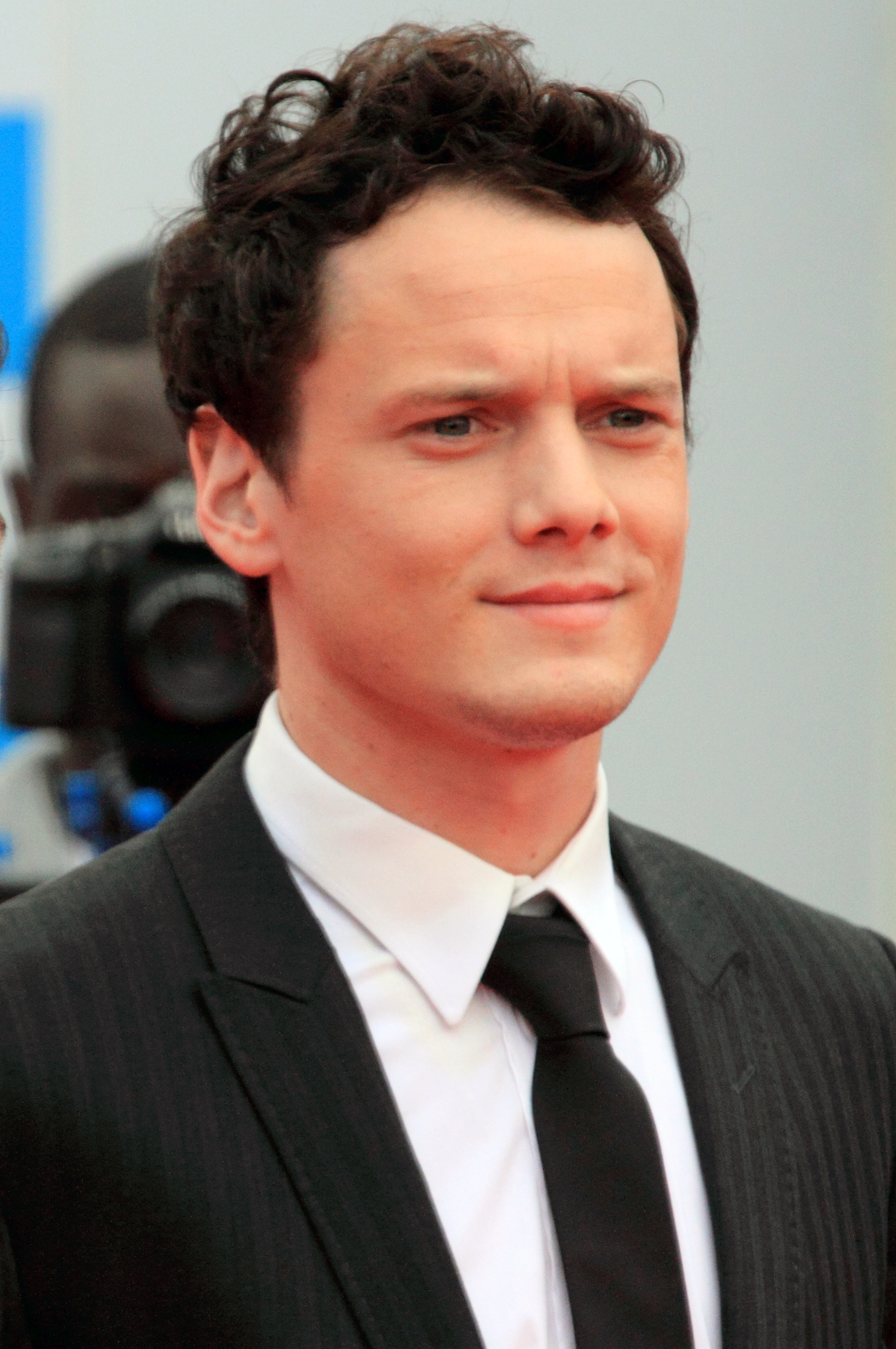
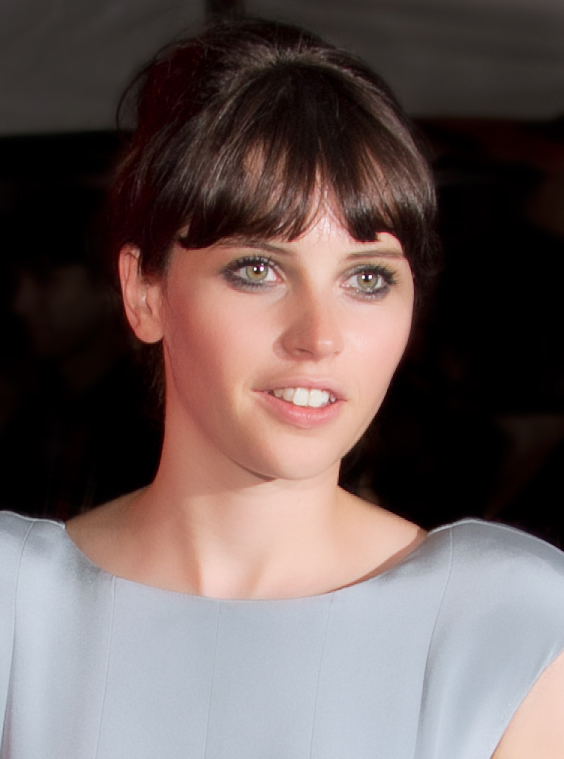
Anton Yelchin (left) was Drake Doremus's first choice for the role of Jacob; Felicity Jones (right) was cast as Anna after shooting rough versions of several scenes from the film.

=== Development ===
Drake Doremus was inspired to make Like Crazy by the end of his eight-year long-distance relationship with Desiree Pappenscheller, who lived in London while Doremus lived in Los Angeles. Many elements of the film resemble their real-life relationship, such as frequent travelling between Los Angeles and London, trouble with American immigration laws, a brief marriage, a trip to Santa Catalina Island (where Jacob takes Anna in the early stages of their relationship), and the gift of a bracelet (in the film, a bracelet is given to Anna by Jacob). The story was co-written by Ben York Jones, who had also been involved in long-distance relationships. Together, they assembled a 50-page outline of the film which read more like a short story than a traditional screenplay. The outline included backstory, plot points, specific scene objectives, themes and emotional moments, but had minimal dialogue.

Anton Yelchin was Doremus's first choice to play Jacob, based on Yelchin's previous work, and was cast almost immediately after meeting Doremus to discuss the role. After auditioning a number of actresses from Los Angeles and London to play Anna, Doremus talked to English actress Felicity Jones over the phone and asked her to tape rough versions of two scenes from the film. He was so impressed with her rendition of the film's final scene—in which Anna and Jacob stand silently in a shower—that he decided to cast her. After Jones arrived in Los Angeles, she and Yelchin began an intensive week-long rehearsal before filming began. Yelchin and Jones met in a Mexican restaurant to get to know one another and during the week prior to shooting, spent "all day and often all night" discussing Anna and Jacob's relationship with each other and Doremus.

=== Filming ===
Like Crazy was filmed over four weeks—the first three in Los Angeles and the last in London. The production budget was $250,000, which included the cost of airfare for the cast and crew. The film was shot on a Canon EOS 7D still camera with cinema lenses, mounted on a rig constructed by cinematographer John Guleserian. He chose the 7D for its portability and the ease it provided for shooting improvised scenes, where he found other cameras too cumbersome. Guleserian said that many of the film's scenes were shot "really far away from our characters [followed by] really tight close ups" due to the technological limitations of the camera, but he noted that this added to the tone of the film.

Only a small number of crew members were employed to maintain the sense of intimacy that Doremus wanted on set. At its largest, the crew consisted of around 20 people, while some scenes were shot with as few as three crew members, such as a scene on a Santa Monica beach where only Doremus, Guleserian and a boom operator were present in addition to the actors. Doremus would often ask members of the crew to leave when filming intimate scenes between Jones and Yelchin so that the two actors would feel more comfortable. These scenes would be shot in improvised takes of up to 30 minutes in length, with Doremus providing only occasional direction. The film's dialogue was almost entirely improvised by the actors, whose lines Doremus believed would come about "by virtue of being fully involved in the character and the moment".

=== Music ===
The film's original score was composed by pianist Dustin O'Halloran. Other music used in the film included songs by Paul Simon, M83, Stars, The Mary Onettes and Figurine. Doremus listened to several of these artists as he developed the story; he said that their songs "became the fabric of the film". He assembled a similar set of songs on a CD which he gave to the cast and crew to listen to throughout production.

An official soundtrack, titled Like Crazy: Music from the Motion Picture, was released on CD and in digital format in conjunction with the film's release.

== Release ==
Like Crazy premiered at the Sundance Film Festival on January 22, 2011, where it won the Grand Jury Prize. Less than a day later, Paramount Vantage and Indian Paintbrush beat bidders including Fox Searchlight, The Weinstein Company and Summit Entertainment to acquire distribution rights to the film in a joint bid for a $4 million minimum guarantee in addition to a prints and advertising fee around $10 million.

The film was given a limited release in theaters on October 28, 2011. It earned $123,140 on its opening weekend with a per-theater average of $30,785 from four theaters. Its widest release was 162 theaters, and it closed on January 12, 2012 after playing for 11 weeks, earning $3.4 million at the domestic box office. It grossed $457,383 internationally, making a total worldwide box office gross of $3.8 million.

In the United States, Like Crazy was released by Paramount Home Media on DVD and Blu-ray and made available for digital download on March 6, 2012. It was released on DVD in the United Kingdom on May 28, 2012. The DVD release included an audio commentary recorded by Doremus, Guleserian and editor Jonathan Alberts, while the Blu-ray included deleted and alternate scenes in addition to the commentary.

== Reception ==
=== Critical reception ===
On Rotten Tomatoes the film has an approval rating of 70% based on reviews from 152 critics; the website's critics consensus states: "It has the schmaltzy trappings of many romantic films, but Like Crazy allows its characters to express themselves beyond dialogue, crafting a true, intimate study." On Metacritic the film has an average score of 68 out of 100 based on reviews from 38 critics, indicating "generally favorable" reviews.

Joe Morgenstern for the Wall Street Journal, described Like Crazy as a "wise and beautiful little film", giving particular praise to Guleserian's cinematography and Yelchin's and Jones's improvised performances. David Edelstein of New York magazine claimed that Like Crazy was "the most infectious love story in decades", comparing its "wonderfully sane" perspective to other romance films and romantic comedies. Entertainment Weekly's Lisa Schwarzbaum gave the film an A− grade and praised Doremus, Yelchin, and Felicity Jones's storytelling ability in creating "a palpably real, universally identifiable manifestation of young love in all its ecstasy and agony". In a review for Rolling Stone, Peter Travers gave the film 3.5 out of 4 stars, writing that "Drake Doremus has crafted a crazily inventive and totally irresistible tale of first love that makes the familiar seem bittersweet and heart-stoppingly new". He described Felicity Jones as "a marvel" and Yelchin as "outstanding". Time magazine's Mary Pols commended the film's ambiguous ending and wrote, "Like Crazy is a cinematic love potion and you leave it feeling bewitched." Roger Ebert of the Chicago Sun-Times gave the film 3 out of 4 stars, praising Jones' and Yelchin's performances and the "intelligent, graceful indie style" of the film, although he found the storyline somewhat unrealistic. Indiewire's Eric Kohn gave the film a B+ grade and felt that while the plot developed slowly, Yelchin and Jones shared "an indelible and entirely realistic chemistry". Variety film critic Andrew Barker, who described the film as "an exquisite, beautifully acted gem", gave particular praise to the film's "dexterous editing", given that it "contains nary an extraneous detail, while still managing to luxuriate in the tender and awkward silences of young love".

A negative review of the film came from Manohla Dargis of The New York Times, who found it "a conventional, wan affair, despite its art-cinema flourishes" and thought that Anna's decision to overstay her visa was a contrived plot point that conflicted with Doremus's attempt at creating realism. The Globe and Mail's Rick Groen also found Like Crazy unrealistic, giving the film 2 out of 4 stars and writing that "nothing feels more false than a failed attempt at getting real". Writing for Salon, Andrew O'Hehir opined that the film was uninteresting, unmemorable, and "sickly sweet". Nick Pinkerton of the Village Voice found Jones' and Yelchin's performances "aggressively average" and described the film as "a rote story, arbitrarily scattered into abstraction".

=== Accolades ===
Award	Date of ceremony	Category	Recipients	Result
Casting Society of America	October 29, 2012	Outstanding Achievement in Casting – Low Budget Feature – Comedy or Drama	Eyde Belasco	Nominated
Chicago Film Critics Association	December 19, 2011	Most Promising Filmmaker	Drake Doremus	Nominated
Empire Awards	March 25, 2012	Best Female Newcomer	Felicity Jones	Won
Golden Trailer Awards	May 31, 2012	Theatrical Trailers – Best Romance	Paramount Pictures; Ignition Creative	Won
Gotham Awards	November 28, 2011	Breakthrough Actor	Felicity Jones	Won
Hamptons International Film Festival	October 16, 2011	Breakthrough Performer	Anton Yelchin	Won
Hollywood Film Festival	October 24, 2011	Hollywood Spotlight Award	Anton Yelchin	Won
Hollywood Film Festival	October 24, 2011	New Hollywood Award	Felicity Jones	Won
MTV Movie Awards	June 3, 2012	Best Song from a Movie	Figurine – "IMpossible"	Nominated
National Board of Review	December 1, 2011	Best Breakthrough Performance	Felicity Jones	Tied (Note: Jones tied with Rooney Mara for her performance in The Girl with the Dragon Tattoo.)
San Diego Film Festival	September 2010	Audience Choice Award Feature Film	Like Crazy	Won
Sundance Film Festival	January 29, 2011	Grand Jury Prize – Dramatic	Like Crazy	Won
Sundance Film Festival	January 29, 2011	Special Jury Prize – Dramatic	Felicity Jones	Won

== Notes ==
Awards
Preceded by Winter's Bone	Sundance Grand Jury Prize: U.S. Dramatic; 2011	Succeeded by Beasts of the Southern Wild
