= Equals (film) =

2015 American film by Drake Doremus

- Theatrical release poster
- Directed by: Drake Doremus
- Screenplay by: Nathan Parker
- Story by: Drake Doremus
- Produced by: Michael Pruss; Chip Diggins; Ann Ruark; Michael Schaefer; Jay Stern
- Starring: Nicholas Hoult; Kristen Stewart; Guy Pearce; Jacki Weaver
- Cinematography: John Guleserian
- Edited by: Jonathan Alberts
- Music by: Sascha Ring; Dustin O'Halloran
- Production companies: Route One Films; Scott Free Productions; Freedom Media; Infinite Frameworks Studio
- Distributed by: A24; DirecTV Cinema
- Release dates: September 5, 2015 (Venice); May 26, 2016
- Running time: 101 minutes
- Country: United States
- Language: English
- Box office: $2.1 million

Equals is a 2015 American science fiction romantic drama film directed by Drake Doremus, produced by Michael Pruss, Chip Diggins, Ann Ruak, Michael Schaefer, and Jay Stern, and written by Nathan Parker from a story by Doremus. It stars Nicholas Hoult and Kristen Stewart as two people living in a dystopian, post-apocalyptic world where all the people are robotic, emotionless workers, and any sign of emotions is treated as a disease. Additional roles are played by Guy Pearce and Jacki Weaver.

The film had its world premiere in 2015 in the international competition section of the 72nd Venice International Film Festival. The film had its North American premiere in the Special Presentations programme at the 2015 Toronto International Film Festival. The film was released on May 26, 2016 through DirecTV Cinema prior to opening in a limited release on July 15 by A24. It grossed $2.1 million worldwide and received mixed reviews.

== Plot ==
In a futuristic dystopian society, citizens, known as "members", live under the Collective, the legislative body which monitors and controls the people's actions. Citizens are mentally stabilized and all emotions and most illnesses are eradicated, with emotion and sexual activity contrary to the society's rules, and conception is through artificial insemination via a conception summons.

Silas, a citizen, works as an illustrator for Atmos. Returning home one night, he sees two citizens detained by officials and is reminded of a purported epidemic of Switched-On Syndrome (SOS), a multi-stage "disease" that restores human emotions. Sufferers who do not take their own lives progress to stage four and are detained in the dreaded Defective Emotional Neuropathy Facility (the DEN), the Collective's institution, which no one ever leaves. The next day at work a suicidal employee jumps to his death and the emotionless workers coldly analyze the moment. Silas is the only group member to notice fellow worker Nia having an emotional reaction. Later in a team meeting, he again sees Nia's expression portray emotion.

The following day Silas becomes distracted during a conference at Atmos, falls asleep more often, and experiences a nightmare for the first time. He goes for a check-up and is befriended by an official named Jonas with stage 2 SOS. Silas is diagnosed with Stage 1 and is given a prescription. Nevertheless he worsens, as his drawings become emotional and his interest in Nia grows. Suspecting that Nia also has SOS, he confronts her but she insists that she is clean. One day he follows Nia into the bathroom and they touch for the first time. She reveals that she has had SOS for over a year, hiding it to avoid discovery and ostracisation. They kiss and continue to meet on subsequent nights, exploring and sharing their emotions. One night in the bathroom they hear Leonard, the company manager, and Silas converses with him. Leonard spots Nia's workstation powered on and reveals that he has been monitoring Silas. Silas decides to get a job separate from Nia in a gardening section.

Leonard introduces Silas's replacement, Dominic, to Nia the next day. While conversing with Dominic she suffers a slight anxiety attack during the lunch break. At night while picking up their prescriptions Jonas invites Silas for a walk, and then discloses that he is part of a secret support group and offers help. He decides to go, where he meets fellow members Bess, Peter, Thomas, Gil, Max and Alice, and learns that the DEN's patients half of the time, mostly through encouragement, end their own lives. Nia then shows up at his apartment and they have sex, agreeing to spend more time there. Thereafter, the Ashby ENI cure for SOS is announced and successfully created. Scared, the two decide to go to the Peninsula, a secluded, primitive section of land, to the bewildered support of the group, who warn them they can never return if successful. Jonas gives Silas instructions to ask for Oliver, a pilot, to fly him to the Peninsula. Silas and Nia make plans to go to Wellington, the closest location towards the border, on Saturday. However, Nia gets a conception summons and goes to the clinic, where she discovers that she is pregnant and so is taken to the DEN.

In a near-panic Silas visits Jonas about the situation, who tells him to stay calm and go back home. Depressed, Silas goes home and becomes saddened. Bess, upon hearing from Jonas and seeing that Nia was Stage 4, takes her to a room with Jonas and Gilead and they brief Nia on a deceased Stage 3 SOS patient, Eva. They then help her to fake her death by switching identity implants with Eva, so that Eva is considered alive and Nia is considered dead. She is successful and leaves the DEN but doesn't find Silas at his apartment. Meanwhile, Silas finds out that Bess, Jonas and Gilead were betrayed by Max, and were given the cure. He goes to the DEN where they tell him Nia died and so he contemplates suicide on a rooftop, but gets the cure instead. He returns to his apartment and finds Nia alive and that his treatment for SOS was in vain. They have only about five hours left before Silas' treatment takes full effect and eradicates his emotions. Nia encourages him to fight it by remembering the feeling when they touch. Silas makes her promise that she will not give up on him. The next morning an emotionless Silas remembers her, having loved her, and their escape plan but doesn't actually feel said love beyond mere remembrance. The following morning they nevertheless set their plan into motion. With Nia heartbroken and sitting well apart, they take the Wellington train and set off to the unknowns of the Peninsula. Silas observes Nia from a distance, remembering what they had been to each other, and seemingly affected by her portrayal of emotions much like the beginning of the film. Some way into the journey, Silas moves to sit next to Nia, he moves to touch her hand and she responds to join their hands tightly together.

== Cast ==
- Nicholas Hoult as Silas
- Kristen Stewart as Nia
- Guy Pearce as Jonas
- Jacki Weaver as Bess
- David Selby as Leonard
- Kate Lyn Sheil as Kate
- Scott Lawrence as Mark
- Kai Lennox as Max
- Rebecca Hazlewood as Zoe
- Rizwan Manji as Gilead
- Teo Yoo as Peter
- Umali Thilakarathne as Alice
- Aurora Perrineau as Iris
- Toby Huss as George
- Bel Powley as Rachel
- Tom Stokes as Dominic
- Claudia Kim as The Collective (voice)
- Ananda Jacobs as The Receptionist

== Production ==
In October 2013, it was revealed that Drake Doremus would be directing the film, with Kristen Stewart and Nicholas Hoult starring. In June 2014, Guy Pearce joined the film, also announcing that the screenplay of the film was written by Nathan Parker, with Ridley Scott, Michael Schaefer, Ann Ruark, and Jay Stern producing, while Chip Diggins would produce under Route One, and Mike Pruss, Lee Jea Woo, Choi Pyung Ho and Russell Levine would executive produce. In July 2014, Kate Lyn Sheil, Aurora Perrineau, and Jacki Weaver, joined the cast of the film. Initially, the project was set up at Indian Paintbrush.

=== Filming ===
Doremus, Stewart, Hoult, and producer Michael Pruss attended a press conference in Tokyo on August 2, 2014 to announce the start of the film. Principal photography began on August 4, 2014 in Japan and continued until August 28, after which production moved to Singapore for another three weeks. Filming finished in Singapore on September 26, 2014.

=== Costuming controversy ===
In August 2016, Abby O’Sullivan protested that she had to share costume design credit with Alana Morshead, Doremus' girlfriend, who had previously worked as an actress and stylist and, O’Sullivan claimed, was not involved in the manufacturing or production duties involved with the film.

== Release ==
In September 2014, the first image from the film was released. Equals was sold by Mister Smith Entertainment to over 35 territories for distribution at Marché du Film during the Cannes Film Festival. On July 29, 2015, it was announced that Equals was selected to compete for the Golden Lion at the 72nd Venice International Film Festival and had its world premiere on September 5. On August 18, 2015, it was announced the film was selected to have its North American premiere at the 2015 Toronto International Film Festival. On October 16, 2015, it was announced A24 alongside DirecTV Cinema had acquired the distribution rights of the film. The film was released on DirecTV Cinema on May 26, 2016, before opening in a limited release on July 15, 2016.

== Reception ==
The film has received mixed reviews from critics. On review aggregator Rotten Tomatoes, the film has an approval rating of 36% based on 87 reviews with a weighted average score of 5.2/10. The website's critical consensus reads, "Equals is a treat for the eyes, but its futuristic aesthetic isn't enough to make up for its plodding pace and aimlessly derivative story." On Metacritic the film has a weighted average score of 43 out of 100, based on 27 critics, indicating "mixed or average" reviews.

Peter Debruge of Variety, giving the film a positive review, said "Kristen Stewart and Nicholas Hoult play citizens living in an emotion-free future who struggle to understand the attraction they feel for one another in this stylish, if simplistic sci-fi romance." IndieWire gave the film a C−, writing that "the real wonder and marvel and breathless mystery of Equals may be that something so dazzlingly white can be so very dull."

== See also ==
- Brave New World
- Equilibrium (film)
- 1984 (novel)
- THX 1138
- Turn Me On (film)
- We (novel)
