= Newness =

- Theatrical release poster
- Directed by: Drake Doremus
- Written by: Ben York Jones
- Produced by: Drake Doremus; Ben York Jones; Michael Schaefer; Michael Pruss; Robert George; John Finemore
- Starring: Nicholas Hoult; Laia Costa; Courtney Eaton; Danny Huston; Jessica Henwick; Esther Perel
- Cinematography: Sean Stiegemeier
- Edited by: Lisa Gunning
- Music by: Gwilym Gold; Keegan DeWitt
- Production companies: Scott Free Productions; Seville International; Lost City
- Distributed by: Lost City
- Release dates: January 25, 2017 (Sundance); November 3, 2017 (United States)
- Running time: 117 minutes
- Country: United States
- Language: English

Newness is a 2017 American romantic drama film directed by Drake Doremus from a screenplay by Ben York Jones. It stars Nicholas Hoult, Laia Costa, Courtney Eaton, Danny Huston and Esther Perel.

The film had its world premiere at the Sundance Film Festival on January 25, 2017. It was released on November 3, 2017, by Lost City.

== Plot ==
Living in Los Angeles, Martin is a divorced pharmacist while Gabriella is a physical therapy assistant from Spain. One night, the two go out with people they met on a dating app. After both dates end badly, they return to the app and match with each other. Meeting at a bar, they spend the rest of the night talking and getting to know each other. In the morning, they return to Martin's apartment and have sex. Soon after, they begin a relationship and Gabriella moves in with Martin.

Visiting Martin's parents, his father tells Gabriella that his mother has dementia. She also sees photos around the house of Martin's ex-wife, Bethany, and of an unknown girl. At home, Gabriella confronts Martin for not mentioning his mother's condition or the girl in his childhood photos. Frustrated, he accuses her of being nosy and reveals he had a sister who died when she was 16. They have a heated argument where Gabriella storms out. The next day, an acquaintance invites Gabriella to a dinner party. Meanwhile, Martin goes clubbing with his co-workers. They both cheat on each other that night, but confess the next morning, and then decide to begin an open relationship.

Gabriella's friend, Blake, invites them to a party at her boss, Larry's house. There, they both spend the night flirting with others, Martin with Blake and Gabriella with Larry who is a much older man. They then continue a string of hookups with other people until Gabriella suggests a threesome, to which Martin requests for Blake but is rebuffed by Gabriella because of their friendship. She soon starts spending more time with Larry and his daughter.

Meanwhile, Martin discovers his ex-wife recently had a child. Unsettled, he watches old home videos and later goes to a bar where he runs into Blake. After a night of drinking, it is revealed Bethany miscarried when they were together and he has unresolved feelings for her. The conversation makes Blake uncomfortable and she leaves. Martin returns home immediately to talk to Gabriella but she dismisses him. Later, Larry gives Gabriella a necklace, which she hides from Martin and they have sex. The next morning, Gabriella admits she climaxed during sex with Larry, which disturbs Martin as her other dates have never done so.

Gabriella discovers Martin's private messages to his ex-wife and he reveals he found the hidden necklace from Larry. The two have another fight and break up. Gabriella then moves in with Larry. Larry reveals that in two weeks, he will be leaving on a 2-year business trip around Europe, inviting Gabriella to join him, so she can visit her family. Meanwhile, Martin meets up with Bethany where she says she is now content with her life and wishes him well before they amicably part ways.

At a party hosted by Larry, Gabriella demands him to uninvite Blake to which he refuses and calls her immature. She immediately leaves to a club where she seduces two men before breaking down and texting Martin. The next day, Gabriella tries to apologize to Larry but he belittles her and she leaves him. Later, she returns to Martin's apartment who admits he was never comfortable with an open relationship. The two reconcile and redeclare their love for each other.

== Cast ==
- Nicholas Hoult as Martin Hallock
- Laia Costa as Gabriela "Gabi" Silva
- Danny Huston as Larry Bejerano
- Courtney Eaton as Blake Beeson
- Matthew Gray Gubler as Paul
- Pom Klementieff as Bethany
- David Selby as Artie Hallock
- Amanda Serra as Jean "Jeannie" Hallock
- Jessica Henwick as Joanne
- Albert Hammond Jr. as Roland
- Daniel Zovatto as Oren
- Eric Edelstein as Angeleno
- Kai Lennox as Bret Jackson
- Esther Perel as herself
- Maya Stojan as Quinn

== Production ==
The film was financed and produced quickly, and shot during fall 2016.

== Release ==
The film had its world premiere at the Sundance Film Festival on January 25, 2017. Shortly after, Netflix acquired worldwide SVOD distribution rights for the film. It was released on November 3, 2017.

=== Critical reception ===
On Rotten Tomatoes the film has an approval rating of 71% based on reviews from 17 critics, with an average rating of 6.30/10. On Metacritic, the film has a score of 50 out of 100, based on reviews from 8 critics, indicating "mixed or average reviews".

John DeFore of The Hollywood Reporter wrote: "As a sympathetic look at two likeable lovers who don't know what's good for them, it's enough to give us a rooting interest — even if we're rooting for the two protagonists to accept the consequences of their mistakes and move on." Owen Gleiberman of Variety wrote: "The trouble with Newness — and the reason it's shot in such a clinical vérité fashion — is that it’s a thesis movie, heady and ambitious yet overly thought out."
