= Everything Sucks! =

2018 American comedy-drama television series

- Genre: Coming-of-age; Comedy drama; Romantic comedy; Teen drama
- Created by: Ben York Jones; Michael Mohan
- Directed by: Michael Mohan; Ry Russo-Young
- Starring: Jahi Di'Allo Winston; Peyton Kennedy; Patch Darragh; Claudine Nako; Rio Mangini; Quinn Liebling; Sydney Sweeney; Elijah Stevenson
- Composer: Hrishikesh Hirway
- Country of origin: United States
- Original language: English
- No. of seasons: 1
- No. of episodes: 10

Production
- Executive producers: Josh Appelbaum; André Nemec; Jeff Pinkner; Scott Rosenberg; Ben York Jones; Michael Mohan
- Running time: 22–27 minutes
- Production company: Midnight Radio

Original release
- Network: Netflix
- Release: February 16, 2018

Everything Sucks! is an American comedy drama television series created by Ben York Jones and Michael Mohan. The series is set in the real-life town of Boring, Oregon in 1996, and focuses on a group of teenagers who attend the fictional Boring High School as they proceed to make a movie together while dealing with issues such as finding their sexualities, mental health, and growing up.

Ten half-hour episodes were ordered by Netflix and the series was released on February 16, 2018. On April 6, 2018, it was announced that Netflix had cancelled the series after one season.

== Plot ==
Everything Sucks! revolves around students at Boring High School in Oregon in 1996; centering around the A/V Club, and the Drama Club, with both groups seen as misfits. Luke O'Neil is a freshman at Boring, along with his best friends, McQuaid, a pessimistic geek, and Tyler Bowen, a squeaky-voiced, immature teen. Immediately, the boys are seen as social outcasts and join the A/V Club, where Luke develops a crush on Kate Messner, the principal's daughter and a sophomore at Boring. Kate, however, starts questioning her sexuality and develops a crush on drama student Emaline Addario, who is dating fellow drama student Oliver Schermerhorn. However, Kate starts dating Luke after rumors of her being gay are spread around the school.

When an accidental destruction of the sets, inadvertently caused by Kate, causes the play to be cancelled, Luke and his friends suggest the A/V Club and Drama Club make a movie together, which would then be screened to the whole high school. Meanwhile, Luke deals with discovering VHS tapes that his father made before leaving him and his mother years prior. Throughout the season, Luke's mother, Sherry, begins to grow close to Ken Messner, Kate's father and the principal of Boring, and Kate is struggling with her identity and sexuality, Tyler struggles with his friends' interest in girls, and McQuaid develops a crush on Emaline, only to be rejected.

== Cast ==
=== Main cast ===
- Jahi Di'Allo Winston as Luke O'Neil, a freshman in A/V club who has a crush on Kate Messner. His father, Leroy, abandoned him and his mother when he was a child.
- Peyton Kennedy as Kate Messner, the daughter of the principal and a sophomore in A/V club. She starts questioning her sexuality and develops a crush on Emaline Addario.
- Patch Darragh as Ken Messner, the principal and Kate's dad who starts to connect with Sherry, Luke's mother. His wife, Kate's mother, died when Kate was five.
- Claudine Nako as Sherry O'Neil, Luke's mother and a flight attendant who starts to become romantically close to Ken
- Quinn Liebling as Tyler Bowen, a freshman in A/V club and one of Luke's best friends. He has ADHD and dyslexia.
- Elijah Stevenson as Oliver Schermerhorn, a senior in drama club and Emaline's boyfriend, who eventually runs away to New York
- Sydney Sweeney as Emaline Addario, a junior in drama club and Oliver's ex-girlfriend with a flair for drama
- Rio Mangini as McQuaid, a freshman in A/V club, one of Luke's best friends

=== Recurring cast ===
- Abi Brittle as Leslie, a religious member of A/V club, who is friends with Kate and later develops a crush on Tyler
- Jalon Howard as Cedric, a member of the drama club
- Connor Muhl as Scott Pocket, a pervy student who reads the morning announcements with Jessica
- Nicole McCullough as Jessica Betts, a perfectionist who reads the morning announcements with Scott
- Ben York Jones as Mr. Stargrove, the quirky A/V club teacher

=== Guest stars ===
- Zachary Ray Sherman as Leroy O'Neil, Luke's father who left when he was 7 years old
- Jen Taylor as Miss Stock, a teacher of Boring High School

== Episodes ==
No.	Title	Directed by	Written by	Original release date
1	"Plutonium"	Michael Mohan	Ben York Jones & Michael Mohan	February 16, 2018
As a new year begins at Boring High School, freshman Luke and his friends, McQuaid and Tyler join the A/V club. Luke develops a crush on Kate Messner, the principal's daughter. Emaline, a drama student, catches the eyes of Kate during lunch. Luke invites Kate over to his house to fix her camera, and she takes a porn magazine from his garage. At home, Kate stares at photos of women in the magazine and is about to masturbate before her father walks in and interrupts, thinking she is looking at the photos due to insecurity about her body image. Luke then makes a plan on how to ask Kate out.
2	"Maybe You’re Gonna Be the One That Saves Me"	Michael Mohan	Ben York Jones & Michael Mohan	February 16, 2018
Luke plans on how to ask Kate out. Kate, after encountering Emaline in the locker room, deals with rumors of her being a lesbian and 'dyke' being written on her locker. Luke makes a video for Kate based on the music video for "Wonderwall" and proceeds to ask her out, which she says yes to. Meanwhile, Luke finds VHS tapes, which contain videos of his father, who left when he was young, talking to the camera.
3	"All That and a Bag of Chips"	Michael Mohan	Noelle Valdivia	February 16, 2018
Luke and Kate watch the drama club rehearse for the upcoming school play, but Kate ends up pulling the fire alarm when Luke tries to kiss her, destroying the sets for the play. The drama club plans revenge after their play is then cancelled, resulting in Emaline going to detention, as well as Luke, who covers up for Kate. At the end, Kate, McQuaid, Tyler, and Luke go to the drama club with plan to ease tensions. Meanwhile, Ken, the principal, and Sherry, Luke's mother, meet when Sherry is called in following Luke's detention.
4	"Romeo & Juliet in Space"	Michael Mohan	Hayley Tyler	February 16, 2018
Luke, Tyler, McQuaid, and Kate present the idea of a movie in place of the play, in order to ease the tensions between the two groups. While playing spin-the-bottle, Luke lands on Kate and they kiss in the closet, which results in Kate revealing that she thinks she is a lesbian. Following this, the drama club says that they will take up the A/V club's offer. Meanwhile, Sherry and Ken engage in spontaneous immature behavior, including TP-ing someone's house.
5	"What the Hell’s a Zarginda?"	Ry Russo-Young	Ben York Jones & Michael Mohan	February 16, 2018
Luke tries to help Kate deal with her recent revelation. Luke suggests that they stay in a relationship so that no one suspects that she is a lesbian with the condition that Luke tells Kate if he starts falling in love with her. Luke and Oliver hold auditions for the movie before casting Oliver and Emaline in the lead roles. Emaline takes Kate shopping after she is told Kate would be helping with costumes. Ken invites Luke over for dinner, and Luke realizes he is in love with Kate after listening to her sing "Rocket Man".
6	"Sometimes I Hear My Voice"	Ry Russo-Young	Ben York Jones	February 16, 2018
Luke gets tickets for him and Kate to see Tori Amos in Portland, so they take a car from Luke's garage and drive there. At the concert, Kate sees two girls kissing and realizes it's time for her and Luke to break up. Kate proceeds to argue with Luke and tells him that she's happy the way she is and that nothing can change her. She says that it was important that she knew who she was, saying that he needed to stop making it about him. She then tells Luke that he only enjoyed the idea of her, and the idea of a girlfriend. Ken and Sherry partake in contraband that was confiscated from a student, they go around the school before going swimming and kissing, before Kate calls Ken to pick them up following the car being towed.
7	"Cheesecake to a Fat Man"	Ry Russo-Young	Sean Cummings	February 16, 2018
Following his breakup with Kate, Luke is angry and irritable in their last couple days of filming. Kate changes her room around and attempts to pierce her nose, while her father celebrates in joy after his night with Sherry. Kate then convinces her dad to fund a field trip to Dominguez Rocks, to serve as a backdrop for a part of their film. Meanwhile, Oliver, Emaline, and Tyler experiment with drugs with the assistance of McQuaid following a visit on the internet.
8	"I Just Wanna Be Anybody"	Michael Mohan	Hayley Tyler	February 16, 2018
The A/V Club and Drama Club go to California to shoot important scenes for their movie. However, when it's revealed that Oliver left for New York, McQuaid offers to take his role. In Oliver's absence, Emaline starts acting and dressing differently and at the motel that night, she tells Kate that she's lucky she can just be herself because she was afraid of who she was now without Oliver. Emaline then admits she was jealous of Kate, while Kate admits that she finds Emaline attractive and the two almost kiss before being interrupted. Meanwhile, Kate tracks down Luke's father at a Blockbuster and takes Luke to see him. However, Luke quickly leaves and becomes angry at Kate.
9	"My Friends Have Been Eaten by Spiders"	Michael Mohan	Noelle Valdivia	February 16, 2018
Returning home from his trip, Luke discovers that his mother and Ken have been seeing each other, and proceeds to react angrily to it, causing Sherry to call off their relationship. Luke later becomes frustrated after footage of the film was edited without his permission. Emaline and Kate talk, and Emaline asks if Kate meant what she said at the motel, to which Kate says she did and both of them admit their feelings towards each other. Kate soon realizes Luke had something to do with their parents' breakup and proceeds to have a talk with him. Kate tells him about her favorite memory of her mother, a day when her mother took her to the county fair. Kate then tells him that later that day, her mother killed herself by jumping off the bridge they were standing on. Kate expresses anger at Luke for whatever he did to screw up her father's happiness. Meanwhile, McQuaid plans to ask out Emaline following their kiss during the movie shoot.
10	"We Were Merely Freshmen"	Michael Mohan	Ben York Jones & Michael Mohan	February 16, 2018
Luke, last minute, re-shoots and edits the movie following Kate's words to him and hatches a plan to get his mother and Ken back together. Kate realizes the changed ending is about them, and Luke finally realizing that they're just friends. Kate expresses her gratitude to Luke, and they make amends and Luke apologizes to his mother following the film. After the screening, Emaline takes Kate back to the auditorium, where they dance to Duran Duran on the stage and kiss. McQuaid, who built up the courage to ask Emaline out, walks in on them kissing, and walks out, dejected. Afterwards, Kate, Ken, Sherry, and Luke go and get pizza. The season ends with Luke's father, Leroy, turning up at the door.

== Production ==
Filming for the series took place in Oregon in the towns of Boring, Oregon City, Portland and at Fort Rock State Natural Area near Bend in summer 2017. The crew managed to film in a real Blockbuster in Sandy which eventually closed after they finished shooting. The A/V club scenes were filmed at Willamette Falls Studios, a non-profit public access center in Oregon City.

== Reception ==
Everything Sucks! received positive reviews from critics. Rotten Tomatoes gave the first season an approval rating of 72% based on 47 reviews, and an average rating of 6.1/10. The site's critical consensus states, "A flawed series that ticks off all the nostalgia boxes, Everything Sucks! still manages to tug at the heartstrings." Metacritic gave the first season a weighted average score of 62 out of 100 based on reviews from 19 critics, indicating "generally favorable reviews". The series is frequently compared to Stranger Things, Freaks and Geeks, as well as Degrassi.

Everything Sucks!, although well received, was criticized for its over-the-top use of tropes, sometimes unrealistic situations, as well as not developing its supporting characters. However, the coming out storyline and the performances of the ensemble cast, particularly Winston and Kennedy, received much praise. Emine Saner from The Guardian wrote that the creators "took the idea of nostalgia and teenhood so far they just ended up repeating tropes", however praised Kate's storyline as well as Winston and Kennedy's performances. On the other hand, Jen Chaney of Vulture gave Everything Sucks! a positive review, praising its "treatment of its young characters", and once again, praised Kennedy and Winston's performances. However, she did criticize some dialogue choices, some of the music, and the under developed supporting characters. Caroline Framke of Vox said, that it "takes too long to figure out its twist on a typical coming-of-age romance. But once it gets there, it’s great" and gave particular praise to Kate's storyline.
