= Ry Russo-Young =

American filmmaker

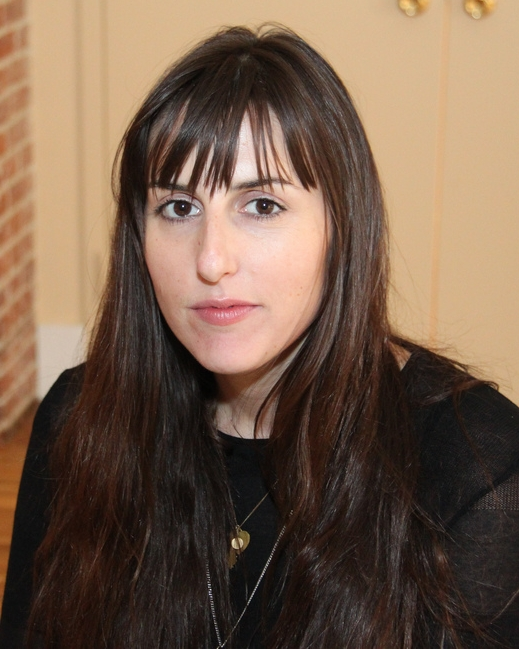
- Russo-Young in 2012
- Born: November 16, 1981 (age 45); New York City, U.S.
- Education: Oberlin College
- Known for: filmmaker

Ry Russo-Young is an American filmmaker and producer, originally from New York City. Her early independent work has been associated with the mumblecore genre, though she has gone on to direct wide-release feature films Before I Fall (2017) and The Sun Is Also a Star (2019) as well as high profile documentary projects Nuclear Family (2021), Call Her Alex (2025), and episodic television (And Just Like That..., Shrinking).

== Early life and education ==
Ry Russo-Young is the younger daughter of same-sex parents Sandy Russo and Robin Young. Her mother Sandy is a retired lawyer who formerly worked as the housing law coordinator of Legal Services NYC in Manhattan. Russo-Young was born with the given name "Ry", which is not a nickname. Her elder sister, Cade, was born in 1980, conceived from another donor.

When she was young, her sperm donor, Thomas Haus Steel, a lawyer known for civil rights cases and a gay man, and that of Cade sometimes vacationed with the family, "until those relationships ruptured.” In Russo and Young's view, “it was a given that Steel would have no parental rights, although they made it clear he was welcome to visit the family and to get to know Ry and Cade.” When Steel sought permission to take Russo-Young to see his parents and grandmother, they refused, leading him to file for paternity.

In 1991, Steel sued Russo-Young's mothers for recognition as father and for immediate visitation, losing the initial judgement but winning on appeal to the State Supreme Court; he never enforced his right to visitation and only spoke with Russo-Young once more before his death from AIDS in 1998, aged 48; Russo-Young, having heard of his fatal illness, called him: "'He was high on medicine... saying, "I'm sorry, I loved you, I never meant to hurt you, I always wanted to be your father." But after going through the case, I was rolling my eyes. You know: "So now you want me to forgive you because you're on your deathbed?"... I mean, there was a time when I did care a lot about him... Not as a father - more like an icon of a man.'" Steel's New York Times obituary, listing his partner and son, parents, and siblings, made no reference to Russo-Young. Russo-Young has explored her upbringing in her work, particularly in the 2021 three-part HBO documentary Nuclear Family. She attended Oberlin College and Saint Ann's School in Brooklyn. As of 2019, she resided in Los Angeles, California.

== Early work ==
Her 2005 short film Marion won several awards including a Silver Hugo for Best Experimental Short at the Chicago International Film Festival. Her first feature, Orphans, won a special jury prize at South by Southwest in 2007. Her films Nobody Walks and You Wont Miss Me appeared at the Sundance Film Festival. Nobody Walks won a special jury prize and was released by Magnolia Pictures in 2014. You Wont Miss Me won a Gotham Award for Best Film Not Playing at a Theater Near You. She also appeared as an actress in Joe Swanberg's Hannah Takes the Stairs and Alex Ross Perry's The Color Wheel.

== Career ==
Russo-Young directed Before I Fall, based on the book by Lauren Oliver. The film stars Zoey Deutch, Halston Sage, Logan Miller, and Jennifer Beals, and was released by Open Road Films in 2017. Before I Fall premiered at the Sundance Film Festival in January 2017 and also had a special screening at the Next Wave 17 Toronto International Film Festival in February 2017.

Russo-Young's next feature as director is The Sun Is Also a Star, adapted from Nicola Yoon’s novel of the same name. The film stars Yara Shahidi, Charles Melton, and John Leguizamo, and was co-produced by MGM and Warner Brothers. The film follows high school student Natasha Kingsely (Shahidi) who falls for Daniel Bae (Melton) the day before she is to be deported. It was released on May 17, 2019.

In 2018, Russo-Young directed three episodes of the Netflix original series Everything Sucks!, as well as episodes of Sweetbitter, and Marvel's Cloak & Dagger. More recent television work includes episodes of the HBO series And Just Like That and Shrinking.

In 2015, Russo-Young won a Creative Capital award for her film, The Family Movie. which evolved over several years into a 3-part documentary series. Released in 2021 on HBO, Russo-Young directed and appeared in the film, retitled Nuclear Family. The documentary explores the landmark custody dispute that hinged on the parental rights of her two mothers (a same-sex couple) and the interests of her biological father. Russo-Young followed this with the 2025 documentary series on Hulu titled Call her Alex following podcaster and media personality Alex Cooper of the podcast Call Her Daddy. The first episode premiered at the Tribeca Film Festival in June, 2025.

== Personal life ==
Russo-Young lives in Los Angeles with her husband Colin Spoelman, Yale-educated co-founder and master distiller of the Kings County Distillery whisky manufacturer in Brooklyn, whom she married in 2014, and their two sons. She is Jewish.

== Awards ==
Russo-Young's You Wont Miss Me won a Gotham Award for Best Film Not Coming to Theater Near You. In 2022, Nuclear Family was nominated for an Independent Spirit Award, a GLAAD Media Award, and a Peabody Award in 2021.

== Filmography ==
=== As director ===
- 2025: Call Her Alex
- 2023: Shrinking (Episodes "Fortress of Solitude" and "Fifteen Minutes"
- 2023: And Just Like That... (Episodes "February 14th" and "A Hundred Years Ago"
- 2021: Nuclear Family
- 2021: Panic (Episodes: "PANIC" and "HEIGHTS")
- 2019: The Sun Is Also a Star
- 2018: Cloak & Dagger (Episode: "Princeton Offense")
- 2018: Sweetbitter (Episode: "Weird Night")
- 2018: Everything Sucks! (Episodes: "What the Hell's a Zarginda?", "Sometimes I Hear My Voice", and "Cheesecake to a Fat Man")
- 2017: Before I Fall
- 2012: Nobody Walks
- 2009: You Wont Miss Me
- 2007: Orphans
- 2005: Marion (Short)
- 2003: Babes in Toyland (Short)
