= Douchebag (film) =

- Theatrical poster
- Directed by: Drake Doremus
- Written by: Andrew Dickler; Drake Doremus; Jonathan Schwartz; Lindsay Stidham
- Produced by: Jonathan Schwartz; Marius Markevicius
- Starring: Andrew Dickler; Ben York Jones; Marguerite Moreau
- Cinematography: Chris Robertson; Scott Uhlfelder
- Edited by: Andrew Dickler
- Music by: Casey Immoor; Jason Torbert
- Production companies: Super Crispy Entertainment; Sorrento Productions
- Distributed by: Red Dragon
- Release date: January 22, 2010 (Sundance)
- Running time: 72 minutes
- Country: United States
- Language: English
- Box office: $20,615

Douchebag is a 2010 film directed by Drake Doremus. The film is a black comedy set in Los Angeles, focusing on Alex Barradas, his older brother Sam Nussbaum (Andrew Dickler) and Sam's fiancée Steph (Marguerite Moreau).

== Plot ==
Sam Nussbaum is a seemingly environmentally-conscientious vegetarian living an established life in Los Angeles with his fiancée, Steph. When Steph asks Sam why he has been estranged from his younger brother, Tom, for two years, he tells her that Tom resented him taking their dog, Angela, to college. Steph introduces herself to Tom - an aspiring artist financially dependent upon his parents - who she brings home, to surprise Sam. The brothers agree in secret to keep their animosity at bay until the wedding the following week, for Steph's sake.

While perusing Tom's fifth grade yearbook, Sam and Steph learn about Tom's sweetheart, Mary Barger. Sam and Steph suggest that Tom bring Mary to the wedding as a date, although there are three women in California sharing that name. Sam and Tom drive to Santa Monica, to meet the first incorrect woman, who Sam has an unpleasant interaction with, due to them gifting her flowers and her not wishing to return them. Despite Tom and Steph's protests, Sam insists that he and his brother travel to the second Mary in Palm Springs. At the roller rink she works at, she denies that she is Tom's childhood sweetheart, but she still goes on an impromptu date at the rink with him. Mary enjoys her time with Tom, but concludes with a kiss that they would not work out.

Steph visits a tuxedo shop, where she learns that Tom never was fitted for the wedding, despite his claims otherwise. Sam and Tom press on toward San Diego. Along the way, they visit a teahouse, where Sam flirts with another patron, Sarah, who gives him her mobile number. Tom watches as Sam eats a hamburger, despite claiming to be a vegetarian. Along the drive, Sam insists that they stay at a motel, despite their destination not being far away. After having beers together, Sam sneaks out to a party, where he meets up with and has sex with Sarah.

Awaking to find himself alone the following morning, Tom calls Steph, who asks him what happened between the brothers. Sam returns, prompting a confrontation with Tom, revealing that Angela was a woman he was attracted to who Sam had sex with. After Tom abandons him, Sam visits Sarah, who he tells he is not a nice person to. Sam and Tom reunite and rectify their relationship. They drive to the last and real Mary's home, but Tom says it does not matter anymore, and they head back to Los Angeles. Steph states she does not wish to get married, while Sam confesses that he needs to improve upon himself. Sam moves out, although he wishes to garden for Steph on a weekly basis. Sam visits Tom at an art gallery featuring his illustrations depicting their road trip.

== Cast ==
- Andrew Dickler as Sam Nussbaum
- Ben York Jones as Thomas Nussbaum
- Marguerite Moreau as Steph
- Nicole Vicius as Mary Barger #2
- Amy Ferguson as Sarah
- Wendi McLendon-Covey as Mary Barger #1

== Background ==
Douchebag is Doremus' third feature. It was filmed in Santa Monica, Palm Springs and outside Doremus' father's house on the Newport Peninsula.

The film was an official selection for the 2010 Sundance Film Festival. The success of the film at the festival led to it being picked up by distributor Red Dragon for a theatrical release in September 2010.

== Critical reception ==
Douchebag received a "Rotten" score of 55% on the review aggregator website Rotten Tomatoes, based on a weighted average of 23 total reviews. Variety's Justin Chang opined that the film "often feels forced and unconvincing", although praising Dickler's film debut as "memorably repellent". Entertainment Weekly's Owen Gleiberman called it "a bubblingly sharp and fresh and dark and winning comedy". The Hollywood Reporter called it "a clever DIY comedy". BoxOffice was less complimentary, calling it "undistinguished, in the sense that its ideas and emotional payloads are both safe and small".
