= Breathe In (film) =

- Theatrical release poster
- Directed by: Drake Doremus
- Written by: Drake Doremus; Ben York Jones
- Produced by: Jonathan Schwartz; Andrea Sperling; Steven Rales; Mark Roybal
- Starring: Guy Pearce; Felicity Jones; Amy Ryan; Mackenzie Davis
- Cinematography: John Guleserian
- Edited by: Jonathan Alberts
- Music by: Dustin O'Halloran
- Production companies: Indian Paintbrush; QED International; Super Crispy Entertainment
- Distributed by: Cohen Media Group
- Release dates: January 19, 2013 (Sundance); March 28, 2014 (United States)
- Running time: 97 minutes
- Country: United States
- Language: English
- Box office: $500,207

Breathe In is a 2013 American romantic drama film co-written with Ben York Jones and directed by Drake Doremus, starring Guy Pearce, Felicity Jones, and Amy Ryan. It follows a high school music teacher who has an affair with a foreign exchange student from England who is his daughter's age, stemming from his disillusion with life and their shared love of music. It premiered at the Sundance Film Festival on January 19, 2013, the director's third film to play there.

== Plot ==
Keith Reynolds is a high school music teacher married to Megan and living in a small town an hour and half from New York City. He gave up a career as a musician following the arrival of their daughter Lauren, who is very nearly 18 and is a champion swimmer. In his spare time, he substitutes for a cello player in an orchestra and is applying for a permanent role. Keith finds his life frustrating, resents his job as a teacher, and his wife's dismissal of his music playing, calling it a "hobby." He wants to move back to the City and work in an orchestra, but Megan refuses to consider this as she disliked the uncertainty of the income and the lifestyle. He is able to audition for an opening in the orchestra, which he subsequently wins. Even then, Megan is reluctant to discuss moving their family back to the City, which frustrates Keith.

The family is to host a foreign exchange student from England, Sophie, for one semester. When Sophie arrives, she is disappointed by the distance from Manhattan which she wanted to visit. Sophie's mother died when she was very young and she was raised by her uncle and aunt. Her uncle introduced her to the piano, but has recently died, affecting Sophie badly. Sophie tells her aunt that she is not practicing her music because she does not know who she is playing for anymore.

Sophie reveals to Keith that she is an accomplished musician and they bond over their mutual interest. While they are alone at the house, she tells Keith about the death of her uncle and that she wants to choose to play music. Sophie is unsure and has lost her purpose following her uncle's death, so she does not play. Keith has chosen not to play for the sake of his family.

Keith and Sophie embark on a platonic love affair, only kissing, spending time together and talking about running away together. Lauren sees them together at a nearby lake and reveals her knowledge to Sophie by attacking her while she is asleep in bed. Sophie panics after Lauren's attack and tells Keith she must leave. Keith tells her he will run away with her. They plan to meet in New York City after a performance, packing their things.

Lauren --- angry at her father and having been spurned by Aaron, a boy she has previously slept with and also falsely bragged he slept with Sophie --- gets drunk and crashes her car. Meanwhile, Megan discovers Keith and Sophie's affair and their plan to run away. While she is smashing things around the house in anger, she gets a call telling her Lauren is hurt and in hospital.

Following his performance, Keith meets up with Sophie. They load their things in the car and are enjoying their first moments alone and happy when Keith receives a cryptic text from Megan telling him that something has happened to Lauren. He appears at the hospital where an angry spurned Megan lunges at him. They arrive home later to a scene of destruction and broken pottery. Sophie sitting watches as the couple silently walk in.

The film ends with the family having a photo shoot. Lauren is fine, but has a bandage over her eye. Keith has decided to return to his wife, and Sophie has left.

== Cast ==
- Guy Pearce as Keith Reynolds
- Felicity Jones as Sophie
- Amy Ryan as Megan Reynolds
- Mackenzie Davis as Lauren Reynolds
- Ben Shenkman as Sheldon
- Alexandra Wentworth as Wendy Sebeck
- Hugo Becker as Clément
- Brendan Dooling as Ryan
- Kyle MacLachlan as Peter Sebeck
- Lucy Davenport as Sophie's mom
- Jenny Anne Hochberg as Swim Team Member
- Elise Eberle as Angela
- Nicole Patrick as Theresa
- Brock Harris as Paul
- Stephen Sapienza as Swim Team Member
- Matthew Daddario as Aaron

== Production ==
=== Casting ===
Breathe In is the third film from director Drake Doremus to play at the Sundance Film Festival. Doremus won the festival's dramatic grand jury prize in 2011 with Like Crazy, his first film with leading lady Felicity Jones, who took the special jury prize for acting that year. Discussing his casting of Jones in his early film Like Crazy, Doremus remembers, "She sent me a tape she made in her flat. She did the ending of the movie, actually in her shower. And it was like, 'OK, wow.' I cast her without even meeting her." After they completed Like Crazy, they began talking about working together again. "I felt like the journey wasn't complete yet, and that we had some more exploring to do."

=== Filming ===
Using the same technique as on Like Crazy, Doremus and co-screenwriter Ben York Jones prepared a detailed outline for each scene without dialogue, and then rehearsed with the cast for several weeks while they improvised the words. Doremus explains: "I start with a 60-page outline that basically reads like a short story, filled with backstory, the emotional beats of the scene, subtext, plot points, but very little dialogue. ... Every take, the scene gets more and more distilled. The first take is 15 minutes, the second take is 10, and before you know it we get down to the two-minute scene we need. ... It is exhausting! But that's a great word to describe it: we exhaust every possibility until we realise what it needs to be, and when you get down to that point, the actors just don't care any more. There is no performing for the camera; there's just being, and you just gotta focus on being in the moment."

Doremus' films are known for their "intimate" style. His use of hand-held cameras, often right in the actors' faces, and his ability to draw out performances from his actors that are natural and unaffected, creates the illusion that we're "invading private moments" in the lives of the characters.

Breathe In was filmed on location in upstate New York and Terminal 4 in JFK International Airport in Queens, New York.

== Release ==
Breathe In received a limited release in the United States, opening in 18 theatres and grossing $15,324 (an average of $851 per theatre). The film's widest release was 41 theatres and it ended up making $89,661 domestically. Internationally, the film earned $481,079 and was re-released in South Korea in 2015, earning a further $19,128. The cumulative worldwide total was $500,207.

== Reception ==
On Rotten Tomatoes the film has an approval rating of 56% based on reviews from 80 critics. The site's consensus states: "Breathe In's plot never quite sparks the way it should, but it remains thoroughly watchable thanks to strong performances from Felicity Jones and Guy Pearce." On Metacritic, the film has a weighted average score of 60 out of 100 based on reviews from 21 critics, indicating "mixed or average" reviews.

In his review for Collider.com, Adam Chitwood gave the film an A− rating, noting that it is "rare to find a film of this kind that is genuinely moving without feeling overly manipulative or sappy". Chitwood continued:

Breathe In completely wraps the viewer up in the emotions of its characters and doesn't let go for 97 captivating, intense, and ultimately heartbreaking minutes. ... The connection between Keith and Sophie grows stronger over the course of the film, and it's clear that Sophie represents everything Keith loved about his previous life as a free and happy musician before Megan became pregnant and they were forced to retire to suburban life. On paper, this premise could easily be executed as bland and boring melodrama. Instead, Doremus steers the film with a delicate intimacy and maturity that wholly mesmerizes; every shot here is a gorgeous composition that serves the actors and story to great effect.

Chitwood thought the entire cast was "fantastic", singling out Pearce who "turns in one of the best performances of his career". Chitwood concludes, "With impeccable performances, inspired direction, beautiful cinematography, and a devastating story, Breathe In marks one of the best family dramas in recent years and a promisingly mature leap forward for director Drake Doremus."

In his review for CinemaBeach, Bryan Thompson called the film "an adult masterpiece that carries Doremus’s thoughtful and methodic style into something both beautiful and tragic". Thompson also praised the "subtle but beautiful performances by the film's cast", singling out Guy Pearce who is "particularly stellar" at creating the "complex and sympathetic" character of Keith.

Pearce offers a naiveté to the character that allows for an innocence and youthful longing that is both piteous and believable. Ryan is equally magnificent as the suffering wife whose obliviousness, or more likely denial, is honest despite its path towards destruction. I've already been vocal about my admiration of Jones in the past, and the young actress shines again here ... The fact that Jones imbues a softness and delicacy to this self-assured eighteen-year-old only proves she's perhaps the best young actress currently working.

While pointing out that the film is as "predictable as melodrama comes", Thompson also believes the film "shines ... in the smaller moments". Thompson notes, "As Keith and Sophie explore their taboo relationship, the film can easily fall into the trap of cliché, but it skirts the edges thanks to a realism and honesty framed through fully formed characters and sequences that are quiet but speak volumes, building on relationships and emotion rather than story." Thompson concludes that despite the film's weaknesses—particularly the last act crisis that "feels forced"—the finer moments of Breathe In make up for the flaws, and that Doremus and company are "fast becoming filmmaking virtuosos".

In his first look review for The Guardian, Jeremy Kay gave the film four out of five stars, calling it a "finely calibrated piece of work from one of the more talented US film-makers to emerge in recent years". Kay notes that while the story is predictable and nothing new, Doremus "makes it all utterly captivating" and "mines just the right amount of drama and spontaneous comedy from each moment and the foreshadowing is perfectly weighted". Kay also praises the acting performances: "Pearce is rarely disappointing, and as Keith, brings a deceptively shallow authority that Sophie can see right through. ... Jones impresses again and imbues Sophie with a wise head and a gently haunted manner that speaks to an almost prescient awareness of how all this is likely to end. Ryan and Davis have less to do but offer strong support. ... As the mother, Amy Ryan is warm and welcoming, while her daughter Lauren, played by newcomer Mackenzie Davis, is equally generous and invites Sophie into her circle of friends."
