= Jardine Libaire =

American novelist

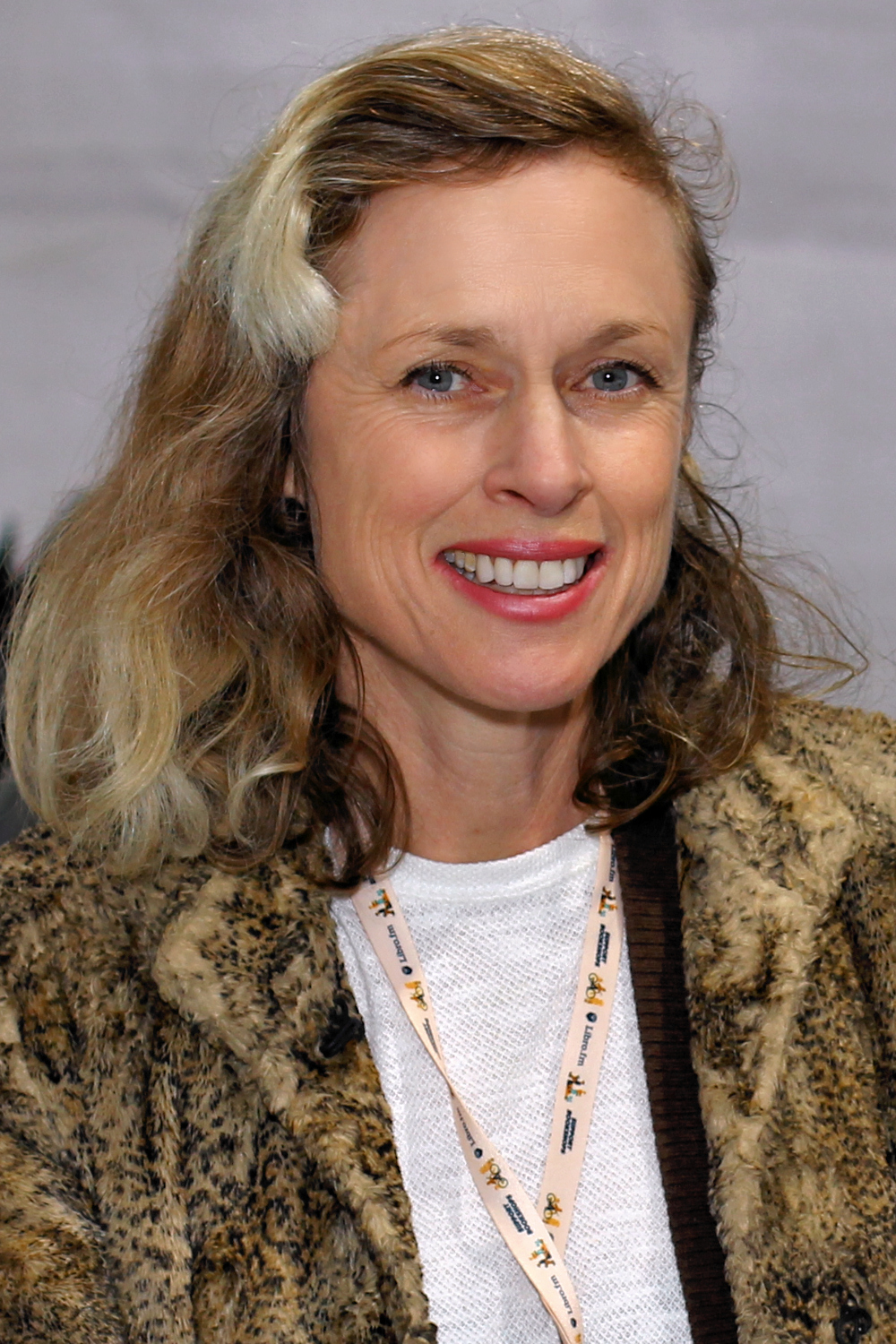
- Libaire at the 2023 Texas Book Festival
- Education: Skidmore College; University of Michigan (MFA)
- Occupation: Writer
- Writing career
- Notable awards: Hopwood Award
- Website: jardinelibaire.com

Jardine Raven Libaire is an American writer based in Austin, Texas. She is author of the novel White Fur.

== Life ==
Jardine is a graduate of Skidmore College and a 1997 graduate of the University of Michigan Creative Writing MFA Program, where she was a winner of the Hopwood Award. Jardine has been the recipient of residency fellowships from the Edward F. Albee Foundation, the Ucross Foundation, the Saltonstall Foundation, Brush Creek Foundation for the Arts, and OMI International Arts Center. She was also a winner of the Glascock Poetry Prize.

Jardine collaborated on the book Gravity is Stronger Here, contributing nonfiction poems that complement Phyllis B. Dooney's photographs of a family in Greenville, MS. This project won Honorable Mention for the 2016 Dorothea Lange - Paul Taylor Prize.

== Bibliography ==
- Here Kitty Kitty (Little, Brown and Company 2004) ISBN 0-316-73688-0
- White Fur (Hogarth 2017) ISBN 1-474-604-88-9
- You're An Animal (Penguin Random House 2023) ISBN 9780593449431

=== Writing as Carolyn Says and with Hobson Brown and Taylor Materne ===
- Miss Educated: An Upper Class Novel (HarperCollins Children's Books 2007) ISBN 0-06-085083-3
- The Upper Class (Harpercollins Children's Books 2007) ISBN 0-06-085082-5
- Crash Test (Harperteen 2008) ISBN 0-06-085085-X
- Off Campus (Harperteen 2008) ISBN 0-06-085084-1
