= The Beauty Inside (web series) =

- Written by: Richard Greenberg
- Directed by: Drake Doremus
- Starring: Mary Elizabeth Winstead; Topher Grace
- Country of origin: United States

Production
- Production company: B-Reel

Original release
- Release: 16 August 2012

The Beauty Inside is a 2012 social Internet series developed by Intel and Toshiba, directed by Drake Doremus, written by Richard Greenberg, and starring Topher Grace, Mary Elizabeth Winstead, and Matthew Gray Gubler.

Hollywood's first social film that gives audience members the chance to play the lead role, the series is presented in six filmed episodes interspersed with interactive storytelling that take place on the main character's Facebook timeline.

The Beauty Inside garnered 70 million views, won a Daytime Emmy Award for Outstanding New Approach to an Original Daytime Program or Series, the Grand Prix at the Cannes Lions Festival, two Webby Awards, and the Best Film/TV Award at the SXSW Interactive Awards.

== Plot ==
Alex wakes up every morning in a different body. He's the same person inside, but outside he's always someone else. And it's been happening for as long as he can remember. He shares his story through filmed episodes and real-time conversations with the audience. Audience members play Alex throughout the experience, both in filmed episodes and on his Facebook timeline, via photos and videos, adding to his narrative at every step of the story.

== Cast ==
- Mary Elizabeth Winstead as Leah
- Topher Grace as Alex's inner monologue
- Matthew Gray Gubler as Alex #26
- Caitriona Balfe as Alex #34
- Anna Akana as Alex #29
- Daniela Garcia as Alex #12
- Steve Zissis as Alex #32
- Jordan Masterson as Alex #14
- Keeley Hazell as Alex #26
- Oliver Muirhead as Alex #23
- Eric Edelstein as Alex #29
- Ben York Jones as Alex #1
- Jeff Ward as Handsome Alex
- Siena Goines as Alex #9
- David Hoflin as Alex #9
- Takayo Fischer as Alex #3
- Bambadjan Bamba as Alex #2
- Melvin Gregg as Alex #30
- Marshall Manesh as Alex #4

== Episode ==
- 1) "The Beauty Inside" (BTS), Durations - 02:32
- 2) Episode 1, Durations - 06:39
- 3) Episode 2, Durations - 04:36
- 4) Episode 3, Durations - 08:32
- 5) Episode 4, Durations - 04:43
- 6) Episode 5, Durations - 07:47
- 7) Episode 6, Durations - 09:37

== Adaptations ==
In 2015, South Korean director Baik released a full-length feature film with the title The Beauty Inside, which is based on the film. It stars Han Hyo-joo and Kim Dae-myung.

In January 2017, it was announced that Fox 2000 had acquired the film rights for an American remake of the 2015 film, with Emilia Clarke set to play the female lead.

There is also a South Korean television series based on the 2015 movie; starring Seo Hyun-jin, Lee Min-ki, Lee Da-hee and Ahn Jae-hyun. It aired on JTBC from October 1 to November 20, 2018.
