= List of Nicholas Hoult performances =

- Nicholas Hoult filmography
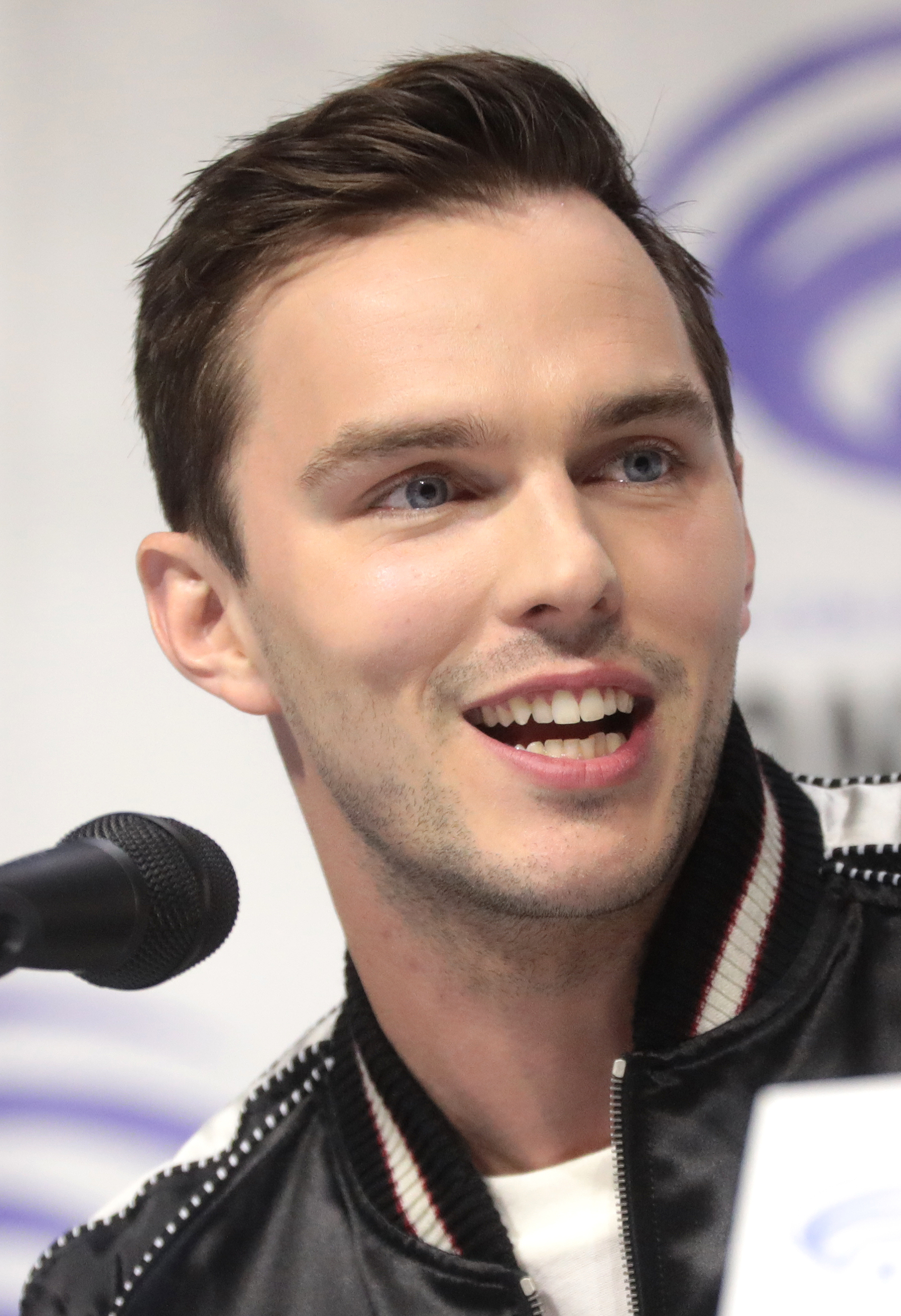
- Hoult in 2019

Filmography
- Feature films: 41
- Television series: 23
- Television film: 2
- Music videos: 2
- Audiobook narration: 1
- Video games: 2
- Theatre: 1

English actor Nicholas Hoult made his acting debut as a child in the film Intimate Relations (1996). He gained wider recognition at age 11 for his starring role in the comedy-drama film About a Boy (2002). At the age of 17, he played the character Tony Stonem in the British series Skins (2007–2008), a role that helped him transition to mature roles. At the Trafalgar Theatre in London, he starred in the play New Boy in 2009.

Hoult expanded to films with the drama A Single Man (2010), for which he received a BAFTA nomination. His subsequent film roles include X-Men (2011–2019), Warm Bodies (2013), Jack the Giant Slayer (2013), Mad Max: Fury Road (2015), The Favourite (2018), Tolkien (2019), The Menu (2022) Renfield (2023), Juror #2 (2024), Nosferatu (2024), and Superman (2025). For his portrayal of Peter III of Russia in the satirical series The Great (2020–2023), he earned nominations for two Golden Globe Awards and a Primetime Emmy Award.

== Filmography ==
Key
| † | Denotes films that have not yet been released |

=== Actor ===
==== Film ====
| Year | Title | Role | Notes | Ref. |
|---|---|---|---|---|
| 1996 | Intimate Relations | Bobby Beasley | | |
| 2002 | About a Boy | Marcus Brewer | | |
| 2005 | Wah-Wah | Ralph Compton | | |
| 2005 | The Weather Man | Mike Spritzel | | |
| 2006 | Kidulthood | Blake | | |
| 2009 | A Single Man | Kenny Potter | | |
| 2010 | Clash of the Titans | Eusebios | | |
| 2011 | X-Men: First Class | Henry "Hank" McCoy / Beast | | |
| 2013 | Warm Bodies | R | | |
| 2013 | Jack the Giant Slayer | Jack | | |
| 2014 | Young Ones | Flem Lever | | |
| 2014 | X-Men: Days of Future Past | Henry "Hank" McCoy / Beast | Shared role with Kelsey Grammer | |
| 2015 | Dark Places | Lyle Wirth | | |
| 2015 | Mad Max: Fury Road | Nux | | |
| 2015 | Equals | Silas | | |
| 2015 | Kill Your Friends | Steven Stelfox | | |
| 2016 | X-Men: Apocalypse | Henry "Hank" McCoy / Beast | | |
| 2016 | Underdogs | Ezequiel "Ace" | Voice role, English dub | |
| 2016 | Collide | Casey Stein | | |
| 2017 | Rebel in the Rye | J. D. Salinger | | |
| 2017 | Newness | Martin Hallock | | |
| 2017 | Sand Castle | Matt Ocre | | |
| 2017 | The Current War | Nikola Tesla | | |
| 2018 | Deadpool 2 | Henry "Hank" McCoy / Beast | Uncredited cameo | |
| 2018 | The Favourite | Robert Harley | | |
| 2019 | Tolkien | J. R. R. Tolkien | | |
| 2019 | Dark Phoenix | Henry "Hank" McCoy / Beast | | |
| 2019 | True History of the Kelly Gang | Constable Fitzpatrick | | |
| 2020 | The Banker | Matt Steiner | | |
| 2021 | Those Who Wish Me Dead | Patrick Blackwell | | |
| 2022 | The Menu | Tyler Ledford | | |
| 2023 | Renfield | Renfield | | |
| 2024 | The Garfield Movie | Jon Arbuckle | Voice role | |
| 2024 | The Order | Bob Mathews | | |
| 2024 | Juror #2 | Justin Kemp | | |
| 2024 | Nosferatu | Thomas Hutter | | |
| 2025 | Superman | Lex Luthor | | |
| 2026 | How to Rob a Bank | Ryan | | |
| 2027 | CoComelon: The Movie † | Boba (voice) | In production | |
| 2027 | Man of Tomorrow † | Lex Luthor | Post-production | |
| TBA | Cry to Heaven † | Tonio Treschi | Post-production | |

==== Television ====
| Year | Title | Role | Notes | Ref. |
|---|---|---|---|---|
| 1996 | Casualty | Craig Morrissey | Episode: "It Ain't Me, Babe" | |
| 1997 | Brass Eye | School Boy | Episode: "Drugs"; uncredited | |
| 1998 | Silent Witness | Tom Evans | Episode: "An Academic Exercise" | |
| 1999 | The Ruth Rendell Mysteries | Barry | Episode: "The Fallen Curtain" | |
| 2000 | The Bill | Hugh Austin | Episode: "The Squad" | |
| 2001 | Doctors | Conor Finch | Episode: "Unfinished Business" | |
| 2001 | Holby City | Oscar Banks | Episode: "Borrowed Time" | |
| 2001 | Magic Grandad | Tom | 3 episodes | |
| 2001 | Waking the Dead | Max Bryson | 2 episodes | |
| 2001 | World of Pub | 11-year-old show presenter | Episode: "Sixties" | |
| 2002 | Judge John Deed | Jason Powell | Episode: "Everyone's Child" | |
| 2002 | Murder in Mind | Andrew Wilsher | Episode: "Memories" | |
| 2002 | Mystery Hunters | Himself | Episode: "Macbeth/Salem" | |
| 2004 | Keen Eddie | Edward Mills | Episode: "Who Wants to Be in a Club That Would Have Me as a Member?" | |
| 2007 | Coming Down the Mountain | David Phillips | Television film | |
| 2007–2008 | Skins | Tony Stonem | Main role; series 1 and 2 | |
| 2008 | Wallander | Stefan Fredman | Episode: "Sidetracked" | |
| 2012 | Robot Chicken | Harry Potter, Captain America | Voice role; episode: "Collateral Damage in Gang Turf War" | |
| 2018 | Watership Down | Fiver | Voice role; miniseries | |
| 2020–2021 | Crossing Swords | Patrick | Voice role; also consulting producer | |
| 2020–2023 | The Great | Peter III / Yemelyan Pugachev | Main role; also executive producer | |
| 2025 | Peacemaker | Lex Luthor | Episode: "Ignorance Is Chris" | |

==== Music videos ====
| Year | Artist | Song | Ref. |
|---|---|---|---|
| 2010 | The Midnight Beast | "Lez Be Friends" | |
| 2023 | The Rolling Stones | "Mess It Up" | |

==== Video games ====
| Year | Title | Role | Ref. |
|---|---|---|---|
| 2010 | Fable III | Elliot | |
| 2025 | Injustice 2 | Lex Luthor | |

==== Audiobooks ====
| Year | Title | Role | Duration | Ref. |
|---|---|---|---|---|
| 2010 | Slam, Nick Hornby | Narrator | 7 hours and 13 min | |

==== Soundtracks ====
| Year | Original song | Original soundtrack | Notes | Ref. |
|---|---|---|---|---|
| 2002 | "Killing Me Softly with His Song" | About a Boy | By Nicholas Hoult and Hugh Grant | |
| 2007 | "On the Street Where You Live" | Skins | By Nicholas Hoult | |
| 2007 | "God Only Knows" | Skins | By Nicholas Hoult, Georgina Moffat and the Bristol City Chamber Choir | |
| 2007 | "Wild World" | Skins | By Nicholas Hoult, Mike Bailey, Siwan Morris and Joe Dempsie | |

=== Producer ===
| Year | Original title | Type | Credits as | | | Ref. |
| Year | Original title | Type | Actor | Producer | Director | Ref. |
|---|---|---|---|---|---|---|
| 2007 | Unseen Skins | Online episodes | Yes | No | Yes | |
| 2020–2021 | Crossing Swords | Series | Yes | Yes | No | |
| 2020–2023 | The Great | Series | Yes | Yes | No | |
