= Zola Books =

American ebook retailer

Zola Books Inc.
- Company type: Private
- Industry: Publishing
- Founded: September 20, 2012
- Founder: Joe Regal; Michael Strong
- Headquarters: New York, U.S.
- Key people: Matt Goldfarb (CTO)
- Website: zolabooks.com

Zola Books is a New York based social eBook retailer that combines a social network, bookseller and recommendation engine. Founded by literary agents and launched in September 2012. the company was described by The Washington Post as "a venture whose strategy is to combine all three of the e-book world’s major market functions — retailing, curation and social-networking — in an ambitious bid to become a one-stop destination for book lovers on the Web".

== History ==
Zola Books was founded 2012 by Joe Regal. Several authors invested in Zola, including Audrey Niffenegger, Gregory David Roberts and Chandler Burr.

Zola Books acquired Bookish.com in January 2014, desiring Bookish.com's algorithmic software, which gave users book recommendations and suggestions. Zola launched "The Everywhere Store," its own e-commerce widget, in October 2015.

== Corporate affairs ==
=== Leadership ===
Zola Books is led by Co-Founders Joe Regal and Michael Strong. Other key executives are:

- Matt Goldfarb, Chief Technology Officer
- Anita Perala, Director Product Development
- Maryann Regal, Director Customer Service

=== Products ===
The site currently sells six eBook exclusives: The Accidental Victim by James Reston Jr., Isaac Marion's The New Hunger, Making Mavericks by surfer Frosty Hesson, The Chemickal Marriage by Gordon Dahlquist, Autumn Leaves by comic Annabelle Gurwitch and The Time Traveler's Wife by Audrey Niffenegger.

The company will soon start selling eBooks from a variety of different publishers. The social aspects of the website come from the ability to follow authors, publishers and other readers, read book lists created by them, and see what friends are reading and where they highlight or mark passages in a book. The site also features publishing news, exclusive author Q&As, and a large amount of book reviews. Zola is supportive of independent bookstores and provides them with storefronts on the site and a way for customers to pledge their allegiance to a certain store so that store receives money from all of that customer's purchases on the site.

== Miscellaneous ==
The name Zola comes from the idea of including everything from Z to A on the website and being like Amazon but backwards.
