= Nicholas Hoult =

English actor (born 1989)

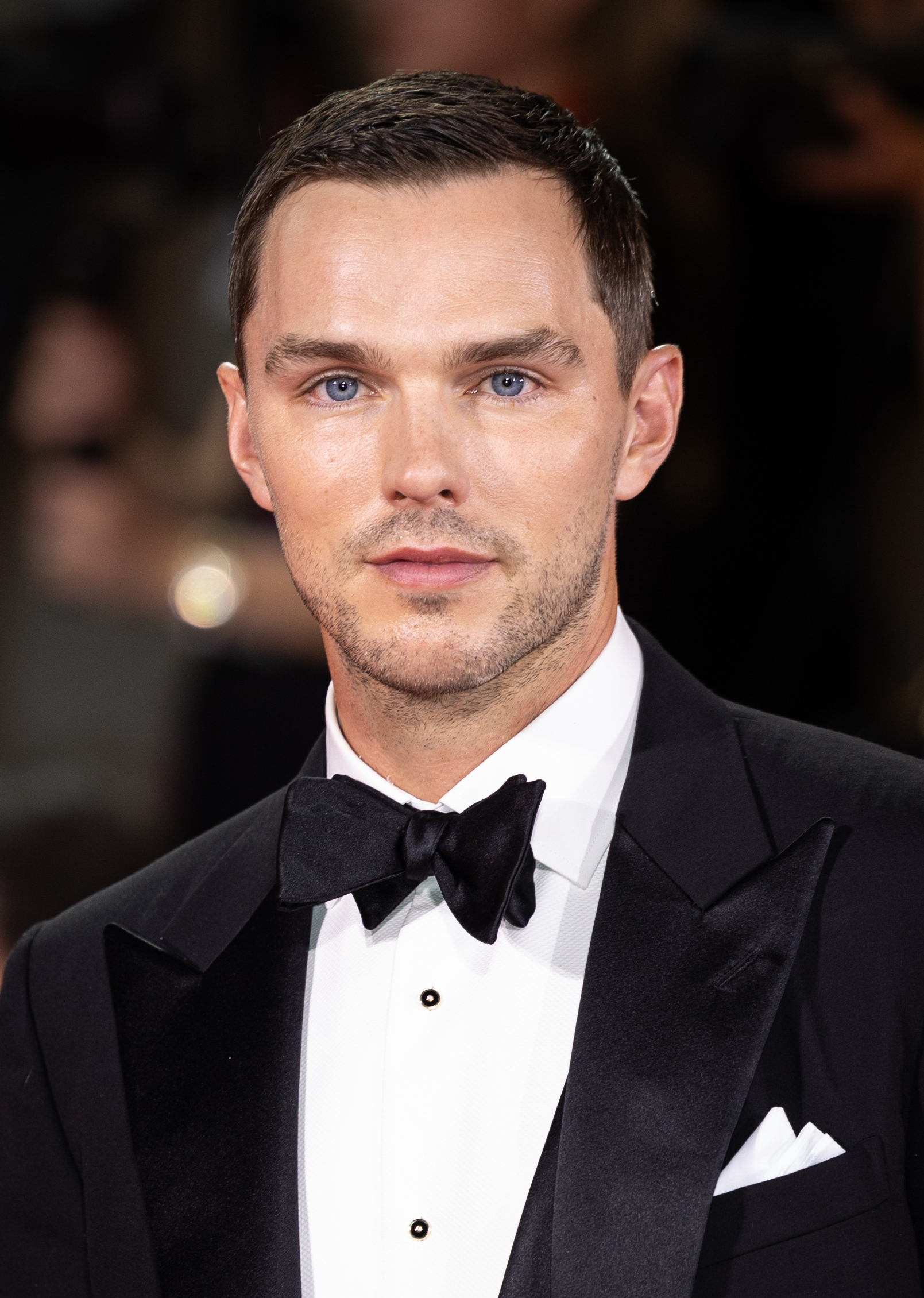
- Hoult in 2024
- Born: Nicholas Caradoc Hoult; 7 December 1989 (age 36); Wokingham, Berkshire, England
- Occupation: Actor
- Years active: 1996–present
- Works: Full list
- Spouse: Bryana Holly (m. 2022)
- Children: 4
- Relatives: Anna Neagle (great-aunt)
- Awards: Full list

Nicholas Caradoc Hoult (/hoʊlt/; born 7 December 1989) is an English actor. His filmography includes work in big-budget mainstream productions and starring roles in independent projects in American and British films. His accolades include nominations for a British Academy Film Award, two Golden Globe Awards, and a Primetime Emmy Award. He was included in Forbes 30 Under 30 in 2012.

Hoult performed in local theatre productions as a child. He made his screen debut aged six, in the 1996 film Intimate Relations, and appeared in several television programmes. His breakthrough came with his role as Marcus Brewer in the 2002 comedy-drama About a Boy. He achieved wider recognition for his performance as Tony Stonem in the E4 teen series Skins (2007–2008). His transition to adult roles began with the 2009 drama A Single Man and the fantasy film Clash of the Titans (2010). He played the mutant Hank McCoy / Beast in the 2011 superhero film X-Men: First Class, a role he reprised in later instalments of the film series.

Hoult played the title role in the adventure film Jack the Giant Slayer (2013) and the zombie lead in the Romeo and Juliet homage comedy Warm Bodies (2013). He had supporting roles in the action film Mad Max: Fury Road (2015), portrayed various historical figures such as Robert Harley in the black comedy The Favourite (2018) and Peter III, Emperor of Russia in the Hulu comedy-drama series The Great (2020–2023). His work on The Great earned him nominations for two Golden Globes and a Primetime Emmy Award. He has since starred in the black comedy The Menu (2022), the courtroom drama Juror #2 (2024), the horror film Nosferatu (2024), and the superhero film Superman (2025).

Outside of film, Hoult voiced Elliot in the 2010 action role-playing game Fable III and appeared in the 2009 West End play New Boy. He supports the charitable organisations Teenage Cancer Trust and Christian Aid. He is also a trained racing driver, competing in the Ferrari Challenge racing series.

== Early life ==
Nicholas Caradoc Hoult was born on 7 December 1989, in Wokingham, Berkshire, England, to Glenis (née Brown), a piano teacher, and Roger Hoult, a commercial pilot. His middle name, Caradoc (pronounced /ka.ˈra.dɔk/), originates from Middle Welsh and translates to "beloved one." His paternal great-aunt, Anna Neagle, was a renowned stage and film actress, celebrated during the 1930s and 1940s. Hoult has three siblings: an older brother and two sisters.

Hoult spent much of his early years in the village of Sindlesham, located in the borough of Wokingham, where his family lived on a quiet estate. His older siblings were passionate about acting and dancing from a young age, participating in classes and auditions. As a child, Hoult often accompanied them to these events, which sparked his own interest in acting. Reflecting on his childhood in a 2011 interview with The Guardian, he described his upbringing as "pretty outdoorsy" and "normal," noting that he and his siblings enjoyed "running around in the garden and making tree houses."

He attended the Coombes Infant and Nursery School before moving on to Arborfield Church of England Junior School for his primary education. He also developed a passion for ballet during his early years and performed as a dancer with several high-profile companies, participating in regional productions. He notably took part in prestigious productions of Swan Lake and The Nutcracker with the English National Ballet, showcasing his versatility and dedication to the performing arts. However, in 2002, at the age of 12, Hoult decided to shift his focus towards acting and enrolled at the renowned Sylvia Young Theatre School, marking the beginning of his formal training in the craft.

At the age of 14, Hoult left his previous school and attended Ranelagh School, a Church of England's secondary school in Bracknell, Berkshire, where he continued his education while balancing his growing interest in acting. By 2006, he made the decision to further his studies at Farnborough Sixth Form College in Hampshire, where he studied A-levels in English literature, biology, and psychology. After filming the first season of Skins, he chose to leave his studies behind and dedicate himself fully to acting.

Apart from his acting pursuits, Hoult also had a musical background. As a child, he played the trombone and was an active member of his local choir. Hoult played basketball for the Reading Rockets, who played in the English Basketball League. He was later appointed as the club's ambassador.

== Career ==
=== 1996–2005: Early career ===
Hoult's acting potential was discovered at the age of three, by a theatre director during a performance of a play that starred Hoult's brother. The director was impressed at Hoult's ability to "concentrate well" and offered him a role in his next theatre production The Caucasian Chalk Circle. Hoult began attending auditions and at the age of five was cast in the 1996 drama Intimate Relations, his first feature-film role. He later appeared in the television programmes Casualty, Brass Eye, Silent Witness, The Bill, Judge John Deed, and Doctors, among others. Hoult initially treated acting as a hobby rather than a potential career option; in a March 2009 interview with The Daily Telegraph, he said he was not "in love with it ... I just enjoyed it. It was like playing for a football team. When you got a part it was great. And meeting new people. It was an exciting new world."

Hoult's next feature-film appearance came at the age of eleven, in Chris and Paul Weitz's 2002 comedy-drama film About a Boy. Hoult was initially reluctant to audition for the role as the casting process was a lengthy one and interfered with his schooling. He nonetheless decided to participate in the early rounds of auditions and was eventually cast in the role of Marcus, a "woolly-hatted, oddball son of a suicidal, hippy-ish single mother, [who] gets bullied horribly at school". About a Boy was a commercial success, grossing more than $130 million worldwide and receiving praise by film critics. Hoult's portrayal of a lonely schoolboy was well-received; David Thomas, writing for The Daily Telegraph, attributed the film's appeal and success to Hoult's performance. By the time the film was released, Hoult had left his junior school in Arborfield and began attending Sylvia Young Theatre School in London. He said the change was difficult; his time there was short and he preferred attending a regular school. He still did not want to pursue acting as a profession and at 14 he left Sylvia Young Theatre School in favour of Ranelagh School.

Hoult starred in Richard E. Grant's semi-autobiographical film Wah-Wah (2005) as Ralph Compton, a boy who is forced to deal with the disintegration of his family. The film, set in Swaziland during the 1960s, chronicles the waning years of the Swaziland Protectorate. Hoult made his debut in Hollywood with Gore Verbinski's film The Weather Man (2005) as the son of a television weather presenter undergoing a mid-life crisis. The film and Hoult's performance went largely unnoticed. Both Wah-Wah and The Weather Man performed poorly at the box office.

=== 2006–2010: Skins and West End debut ===
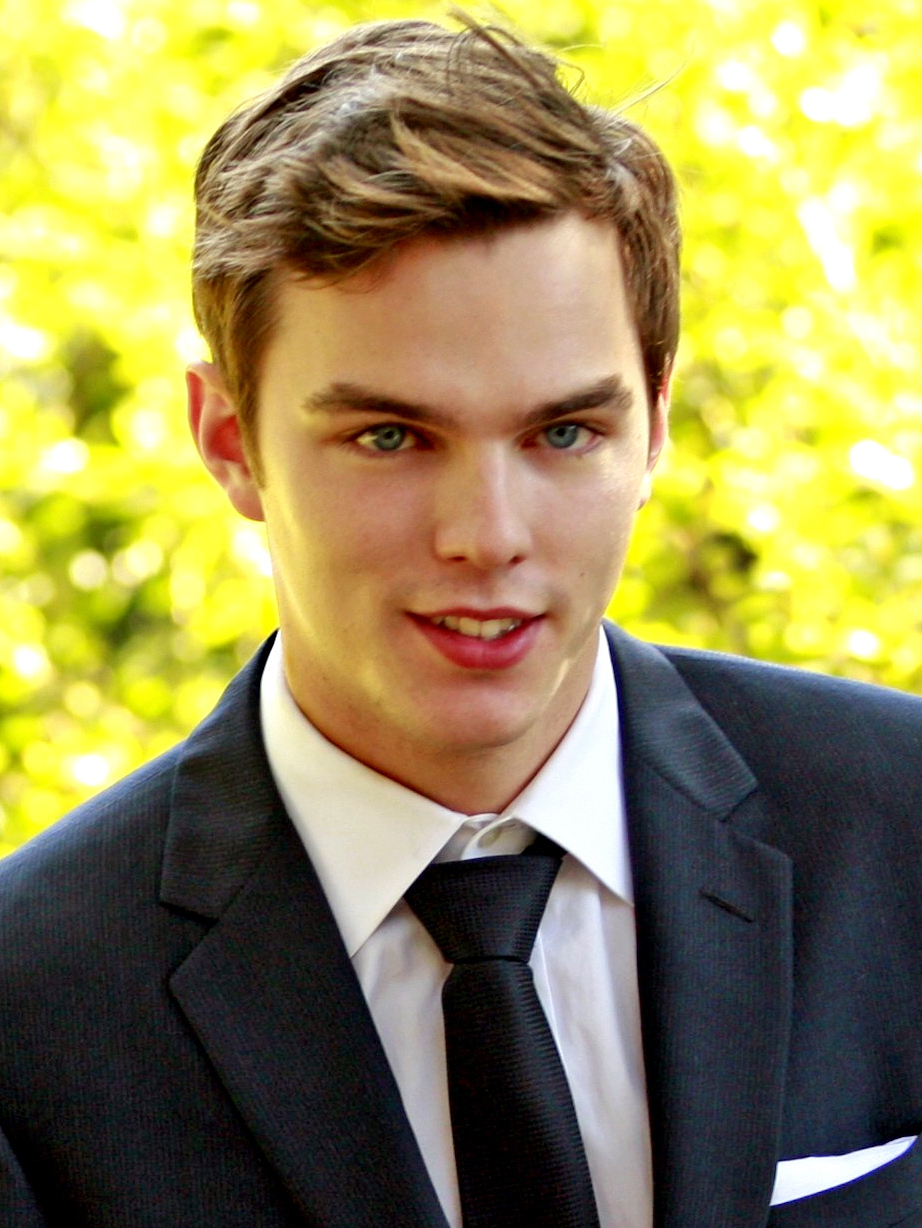
Hoult at the 2009 Santa Barbara International Film Festival

Hoult was a student at Sixth Form College Farnborough in 2006 when he was cast in the lead role of the television teenage-drama Skins. He was initially sceptical of his ability to play Tony Stonem, a manipulative, egocentric anti-hero, and identified more closely with the supporting character Sid. The programme was a success and ran for seven series, only two of which Hoult appeared in. His performance was well received; the character was popular, and Hoult garnered widespread attention. Skins won the British Academy of Film and Television Arts (BAFTA) Philip Audience Award, and Hoult was nominated for the Golden Nymph Award for Best Actor in a Drama Series. Critic Elliott David lauded Hoult for his performance in a 2016 retrospective review, and wrote that he "maintain[ed] the inexplicable core of his character throughout". During his time on Skins, Hoult felt overwhelmed by the attention he received and considered quitting acting altogether at one point. Instead, he left school at the end of Skins' first series and chose to focus solely on acting.

Hoult briefly appeared as Stefan Fredman in the pilot episode of the British television series Wallander. He later made his West End theatre debut as Mark, the protagonist in William Sutcliffe's coming-of-age play New Boy; the production premiered at Trafalgar Studios and had record-breaking ticket sales, which was mostly attributed to Hoult's popularity among viewers of Skins. The play was staged for a week in March 2009 because Hoult had committed to a part in the fantasy-adventure film Clash of the Titans (2010), filming for which was scheduled for mid-2010. Hoult's performance as Mark, a "ferociously bright and articulate but sexually confused sixth-former" received mixed responses from critics. Dominic Cavendish of The Daily Telegraph wrote that his performance was persuasive, but Lyn Gardner of The Guardian found him average and highlighted his inability to bring out the "unresolved sexual tension beneath [the] banter". Clash of the Titans was panned by critics but was a success at the box office, grossing nearly $500,000,000 worldwide.

Hoult next appeared in Tom Ford's A Single Man (2009), after the actor originally cast in the role of Kenny Potter left the film a few days before filming commenced. Hoult had previously shown interest in the project and had sent a recorded audition tape; he was eventually chosen for the role of Kenny, a homosexual college student who helps a college professor deal with his grief. A Single Man was variously described by media outlets as the first adult role for Hoult, who described Kenny as a "spontaneous" character not simply defined by his sexuality. Because the role was his first as an American character, Hoult worked on his accent; Sukhdev Sandhu of The Daily Telegraph noted Ford's choice of casting British actors as Americans (Hoult and Matthew Goode) and vice versa (Julianne Moore). A Single Man opened to widespread acclaim despite reservations from critics about Ford's directorial abilities; it was a box-office success. The film earned Hoult a nomination for the BAFTA Rising Star Award at the 2010 ceremony. In 2010, Hoult voiced the character of Elliot in Lionhead Studios' action role-playing game Fable III (2010).

=== 2011–2016: Commercial success with X-Men and Mad Max ===
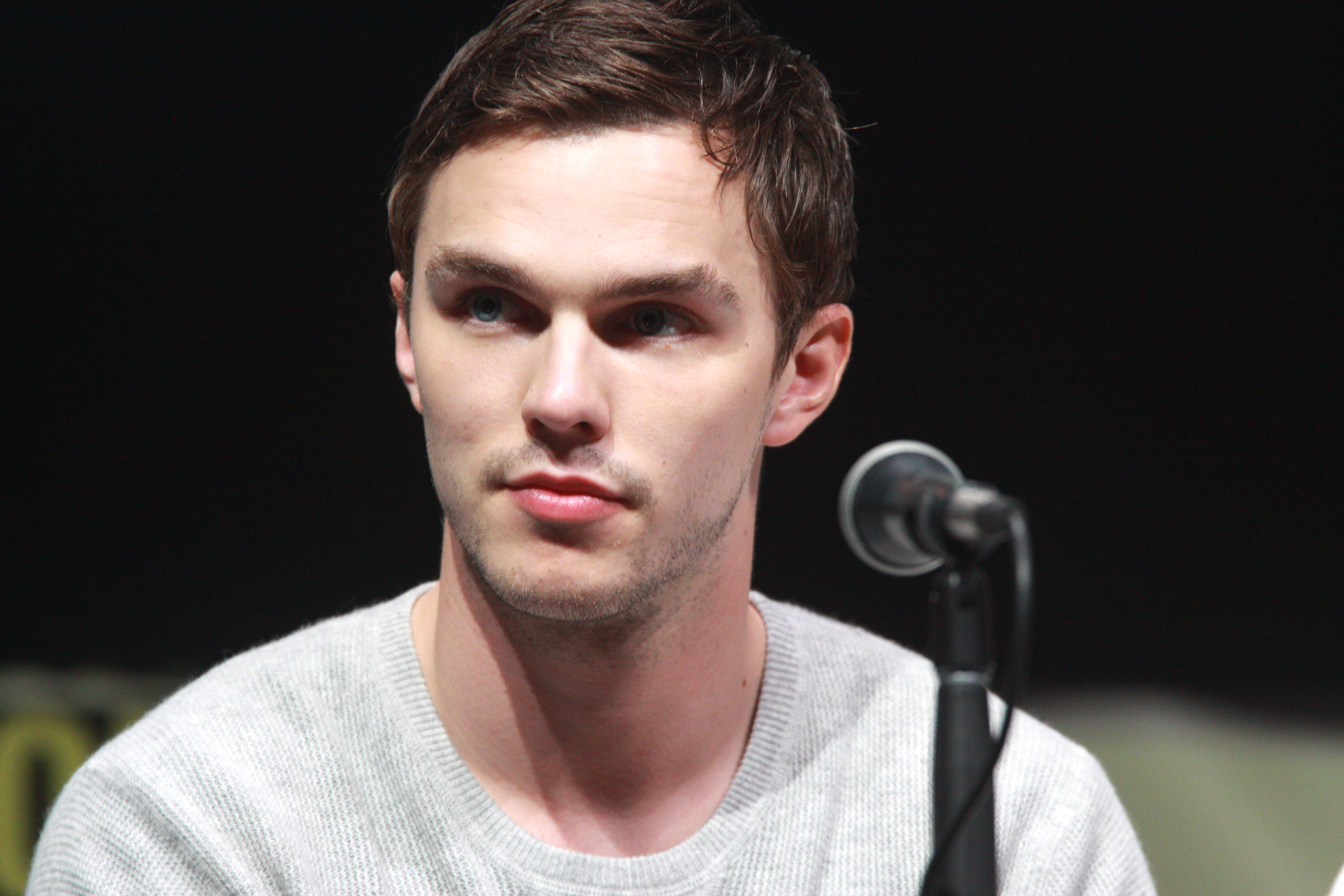
Hoult promoting X-Men: Days of Future Past at the 2013 San Diego Comic-Con

Hoult was cast as Nux in George Miller's action film Mad Max: Fury Road; the project spent several years in development hell because plans for a fourth film in the Mad Max franchise encountered financial difficulties. Filming was planned for mid-2010, but heavy rain caused severe delays during pre-production in Australia. With no other immediate commitments, Hoult began to look for other prospects. He was eventually cast in the role of Hank McCoy / Beast for the X-Men film series owing to his ability to play somebody "gentle with a capability of being fierce". Before filming began on the 2011 Matthew Vaughn-directed instalment X-Men: First Class, a prequel to the franchise's earlier films, Hoult familiarised himself with his character; he said he "formulated [his] own version of the Beast" and took inspiration from Kelsey Grammer's performance in the previous X-Men: The Last Stand because he wanted to emulate Grammer's charm and eloquence. Hoult learned to speak in a dialect similar to Grammer's without trying to imitate it. He also underwent physical training and gained weight to better suit his character. The film, which was widely praised by critics for its script and performances, performed moderately well at the box office, collecting about $353 million against a production budget of $160 million. Although it was the lowest-ranked production in the entire series in terms of revenue, Chris Aronson of 20th Century Fox deemed it "an excellent start to a new chapter of the franchise".

Mad Max: Fury Road was eventually filmed in 2012 in the Namibian desert. Miller had conceived Nux, a terminally ill slave, as a "quasi kamikaze pilot"; Hoult said of his character; "he's very enthusiastic and committed and affectionate but also kind of clumsy". Hoult shaved his head and followed a strict diet because his role required him to lose a lot of weight. He also talked about performing stunts in the film, describing the entire experience as "scary", but favourably compared the stunt crew and Miller's choice to incorporate real action sequences instead of using a green screen, saying it made the performance more believable because the actors are placed in a real situation. Fury Road opened to critical acclaim on 14 May 2015 and grossed more than $378 million worldwide, making it the highest-grossing film in the Mad Max franchise. The technical aspects and stunt sequences drew particular praise from film critics and it was credited for reviving interest in the series. Shalini Langer noted that while the real hero of the film was Charlize Theron, "[Hoult] is the closest in the acting department ... as Joe's 'war boy' chasing imagined glory". Hoult's "fabulously unhinged" performance was also praised by Robbie Collin of The Daily Telegraph. Also in 2012, Hoult was included in the Forbes 30 under 30 list.

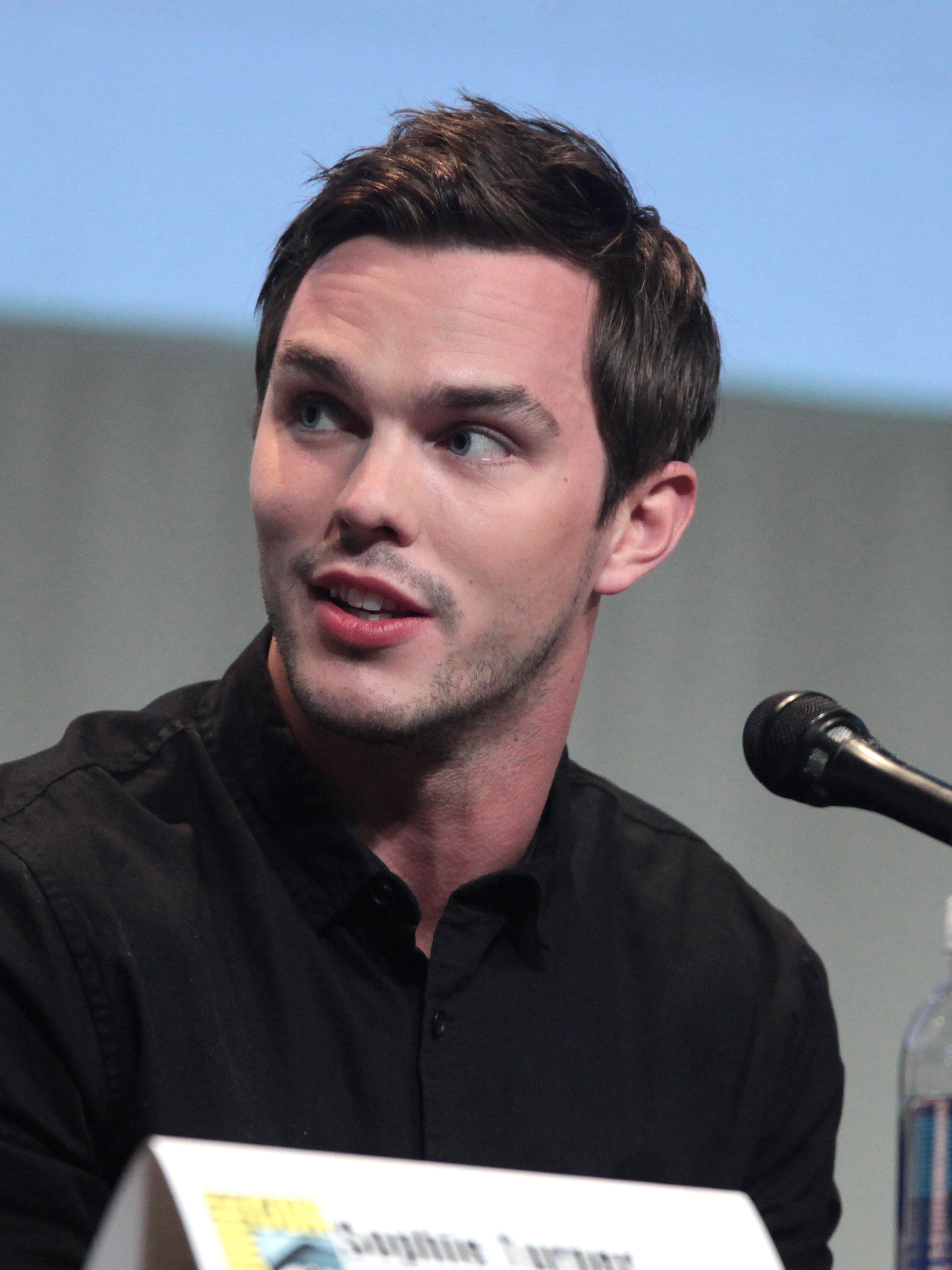
Hoult promoting X-Men: Apocalypse at the 2015 San Diego Comic-Con

In 2013, Hoult had starring roles in two major films; he first played a zombie named R in Jonathan Levine's romantic comedy Warm Bodies, which was released on 1 February. An adaptation of Isaac Marion's novel of the same name, the film is presented from point of view of the central character, mostly through narration. Levine said he had difficulties finding a suitable actor to play R until he met Hoult, who was attracted to the project—which he described as "much more than a horror movie" owing to the use of multiple pop culture and literary allusions—and even more so to the role which "bowled [me] over". Hoult said he drew inspiration from Edward Scissorhands (1990) because he thought the central characters in both films share the same difficulties. To prepare for the role of a zombie, Hoult and the other actors practised with Cirque du Soleil performers; he said of the experience; "we would take our shoes off in a dance studio ... kind of grow out of the wall and make our bodies feel very heavy". The film garnered positive response from critics and audiences. Ben Kendrick praised Hoult for the restraint in a potentially Razzie-worthy role: "[he] brings a lot of life to R without stepping too far in the other direction [and although his] zombie mannerisms may come across a bit forced but, overall, his memorable moments outnumber (and outweigh) the awkward ones." Hoult was also described as "an extremely appealing actor, [who] is charm personified" in his role of the living-dead.

Hoult's next film, Bryan Singer's 2013 fantasy adventure Jack the Giant Slayer, failed at the box office and received mixed response from critics. He played the eponymous hero in the film, which is based on the British fairy tales "Jack the Giant Killer" and "Jack and the Beanstalk". Hoult's performance was poorly received by film critics Mary Pols, Justin Chang and Richard Roeper; Pols was critical of his "disconcerting" imitation of Hugh Grant and the other two dismissed him and his character as "bland" and "boring", respectively.

Hoult then appeared in Jake Paltrow's science-fiction film Young Ones (2014). Set in a dystopian future where water is scarce, the film had Hoult play Flem Lever, a young man who is trying to claim the land owned by the film's central character Ernest Holm. Hoult thought the role was unlike any of his previous work and said his character's questionable choices throughout the film intrigued him. Hoult read novels written by S. E. Hinton to prepare for the role. The film was shot in a deserted location in South Africa; Hoult said filming in the hot weather conditions was difficult but the "beautiful" scenery helped to tell the story better. He said it also made him more conscious of environmental concerns. The film premiered at the 2014 Sundance Film Festival and was met with mixed responses. Commentators highlighted the film's standout scenery but were critical of its plot. Keith Uhlich of The A.V. Club said Hoult was a poor fit for the story's "stoically retrograde machismo".

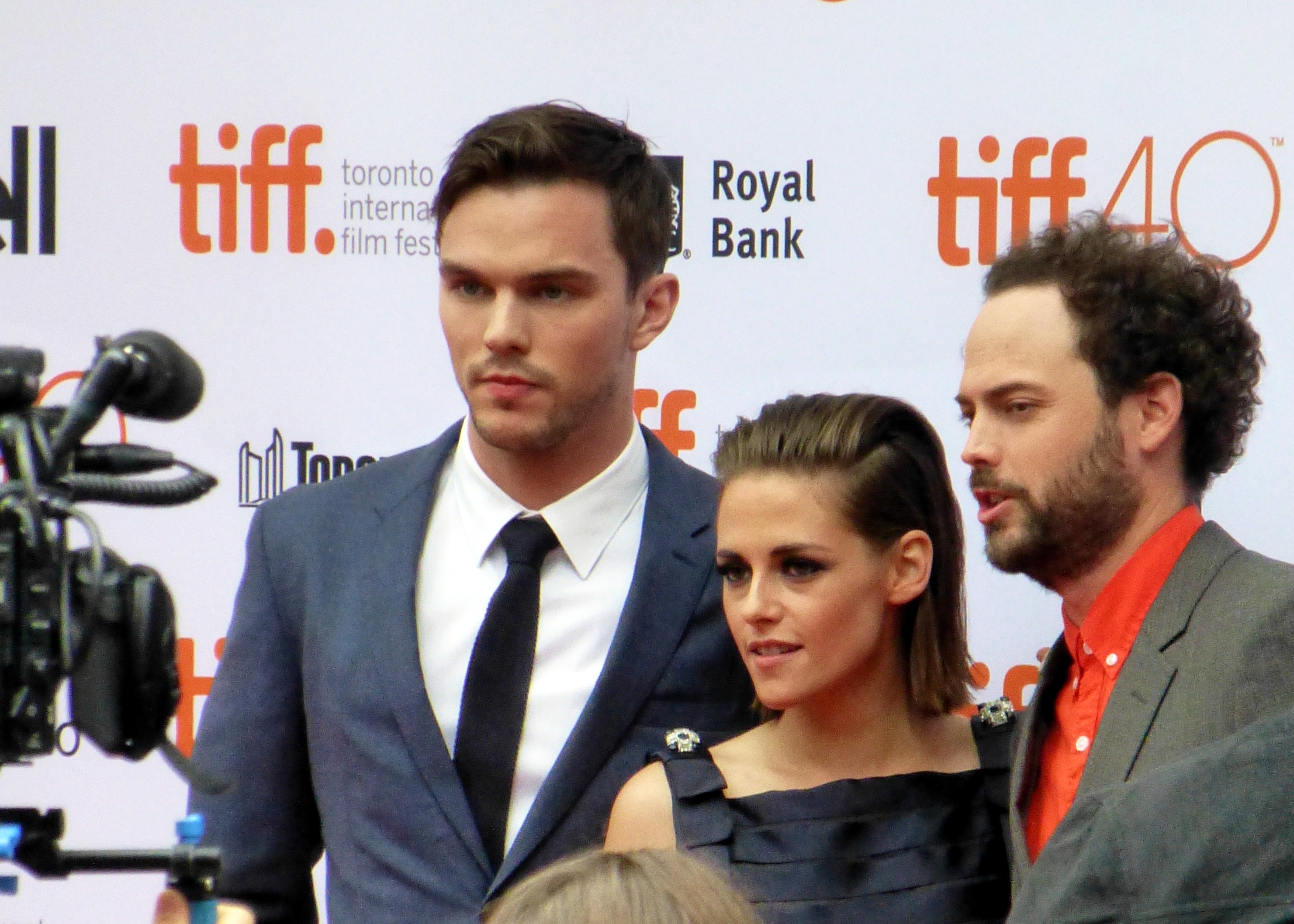
Hoult with Kristen Stewart and Drake Doremus at the premiere of Equals during the 2015 Toronto International Film Festival

Hoult reprised his role as Beast in Bryan Singer's X-Men: Days of Future Past, his other release of 2014. Hoult said playing the character was a freeing experience for him and that it was "fun to suddenly be able to break loose ... when you're wearing the makeup ... you can perform big ... you get to have two very different techniques, performances." He also said the lengthy make-up procedure could last up to three and a half hours. X-Men: Days of Future Past earned more than $747 million worldwide, making it the highest-grossing film in the series and in Hoult's career at that time.

In 2015, Hoult had three other releases—the feature film adaptation of Gillian Flynn's mystery novel Dark Places; Owen Harris' dark comedy Kill Your Friends, based on the 2008 novel of the same name; and Equals, a dystopian, science-fiction romantic drama directed by Drake Doremus—all of which were critical failures and rank among the lowest-grossing films of his career. Response to Hoult's performance in Equals was relatively better; Peter Travers called him and his co-star Kristen Stewart "quietly devastating", and Katie Walsh, writing for Los Angeles Times, said the duo were "finely matched both in their androgynous beauty and in their performances of a repressed humanity". Despite doubts about his contract with the franchise, Hoult returned for the 2016 film X-Men: Apocalypse. Upon release, the film became the third-ranked X-Men film in terms of worldwide box office collections, earning about $540 million. It was also a top-grossing production outside the United States.

=== 2017–2019: Biographical and independent films ===
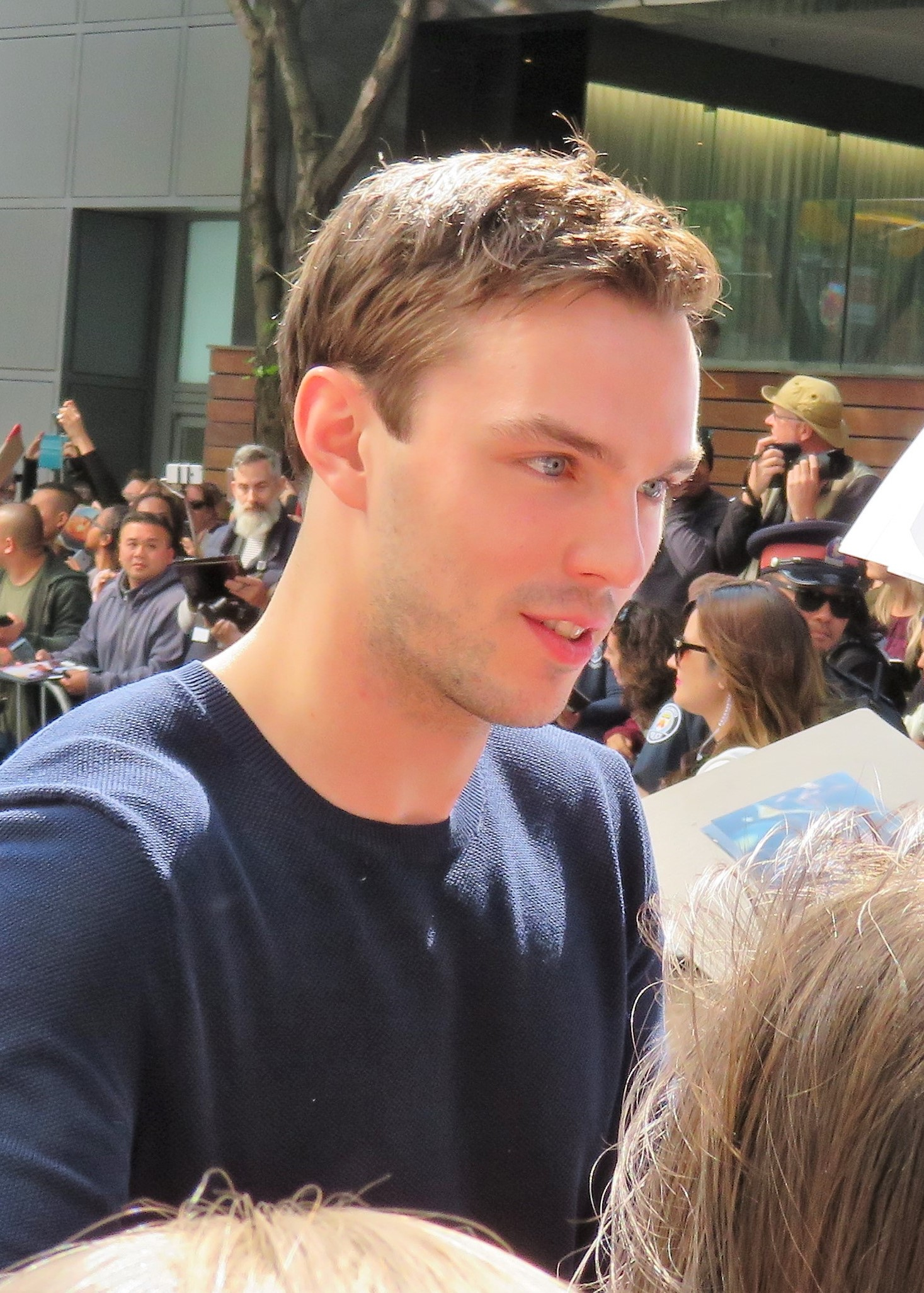
Hoult at an event for The Current War in 2017

The action film Collide, in which Hoult starred as a drug dealer, was released in the United States in February 2017 to a poor response from audiences and critics. The film garnered negative reviews; its dismal box office performance was attributed to poor marketing and multiple delays caused by the 2015 chapter 11 bankruptcy of its production company Relativity Media. Forbes' Scott Mendelson analysed the film's failure and said Hoult did not necessarily have enough "star power" to draw audiences. He highlighted the misogyny and sense of entitlement in the entertainment industry, writing that director Eran Creevy and Hoult would get better offers despite the failure of films like Collide, as opposed to the women and other minority groups, who are either ignored or stereotyped. Responses to Hoult's next film, the romance drama Newness, were more enthusiastic. The production had its world premiere at the 2017 Sundance Film Festival; it stars Hoult as one half of a Los Angeles-based couple who meet through online dating and begin an open relationship. Drake Doremus, the film's director, said Hoult's role was unlike his previous work; "a very complex and emotionally mature performance that we haven't seen yet".

Hoult starred in a series of biographical and historical films in 2017; he said he preferred playing characters that might help him improve as an actor and that the "actors I look up to started doing their best work in their early 30s and I'll be hitting that age ... I'm just trying to learn". He portrayed American author J. D. Salinger in Danny Strong's Rebel in the Rye, which chronicles Salinger's life from his youth to the World War II era and the years preceding the publication of his debut novel, The Catcher in the Rye. Hoult auditioned for the role because he was intrigued by the film's script and Salinger's enigmatic personality; "I didn't know he fought in the second world war and landed on D-Day: ... had intermittent PTSD or that he became interested in Vedanta philosophy and meditated and did yoga." To prepare for the role, Hoult read The Catcher in the Rye and biographies about Salinger. Hoult said the biggest challenge was to get a real understanding of Salinger's character; "everyone has an idea of [Salinger] in their mind ... you're creating a character that people have very strong feelings about. You can't prove to be right or wrong through impressions." Rebel in the Rye opened to a poor response from film critics. Carson Lund of Slant was largely unimpressed by Hoult's "feeble" performance and his inability to "reinvest the character with the complexities lost in the story's programmatic telling". RogerEbert.com's Matt Fagerholm wrote that although Hoult was capable of illuminating the insecurities and fixations of his character, he is never "quite believable as Salinger". Fagerholm ascribed the failure to the script, which left the character's key motivations "frustratingly muddled".

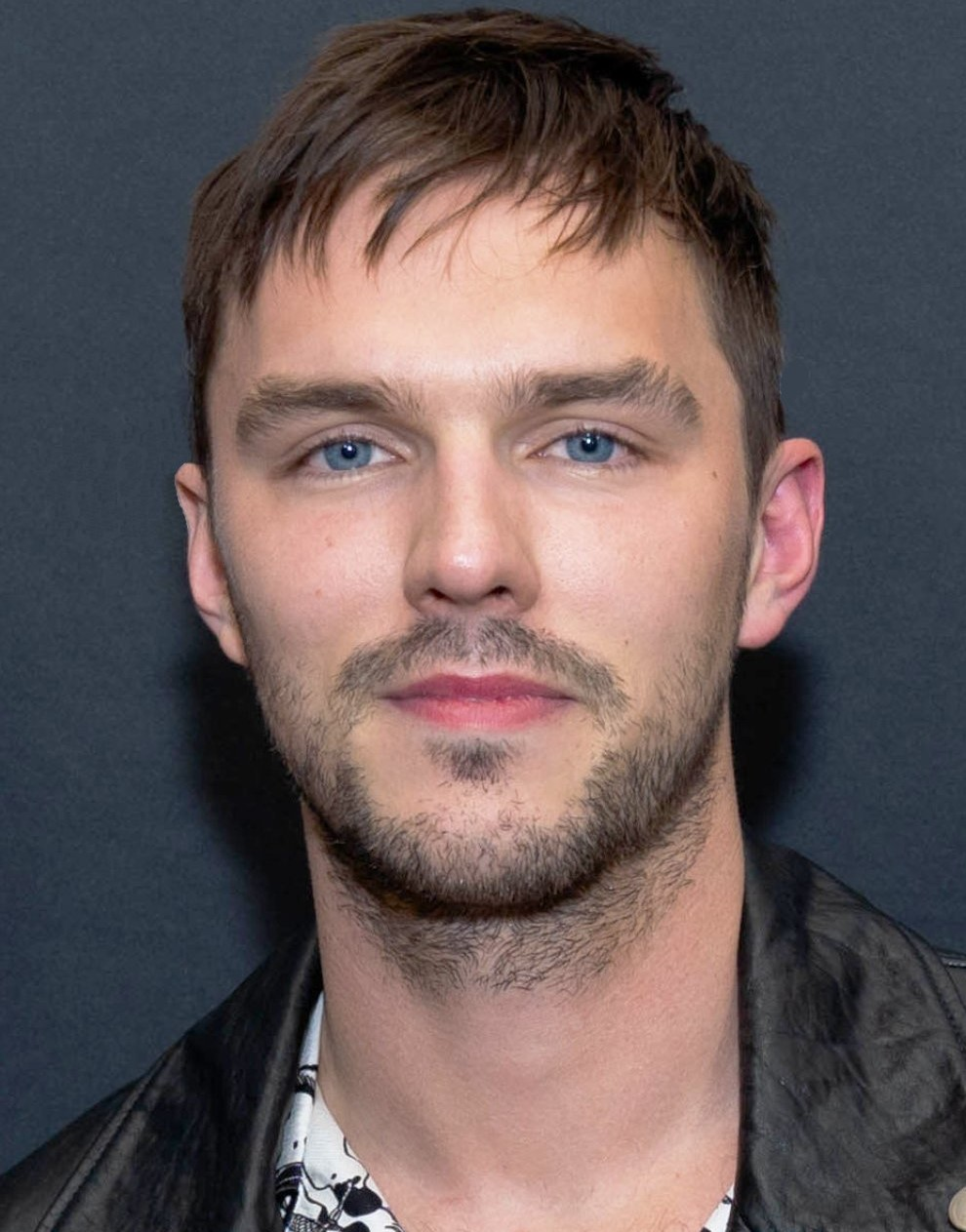
Hoult at the 2019 Montclair Film Festival

Hoult co-starred in The Current War, a dramatisation of the feud between electrical pioneers Thomas Edison and George Westinghouse. Hoult was cast in the role of Nikola Tesla, for which he grew a moustache and attended science lessons about electromagnetism and dynamos. He lost weight for his role by following a strict diet. Response to The Current War was mixed; David Ehrlich of IndieWire described Hoult's performance as a tribute to David Bowie, who had previously played Tesla in The Prestige (2006). In a departure from biographical dramas, Hoult then starred as an American soldier in Sand Castle, a production he described as a very different war film "in terms of the pacing and the emotion ... very under the surface, that futility-of-war idea". He recalled the filming experience in the Jordanian military bases practising clearing procedures: "we put on these masks, get given these guns, are put inside this pitch-black house ... try and hunt down these bad guys hiding inside. You're in all the gear ... the adrenaline starts pumping." Released on Netflix in 2017, the film garnered mixed reviews.

In The Favourite (2018), a critically acclaimed period drama about Anne, Queen of Great Britain, Hoult played the supporting role of Robert Harley, 1st Earl of Oxford and Earl Mortimer. He next voiced Fiver in the animated television miniseries adaptation of Richard Adams' 1972 novel Watership Down. In 2019, Hoult portrayed author J. R. R. Tolkien in the biopic Tolkien. He next reprised his role as Hank McCoy in the X-Men film Dark Phoenix. Both Tolkien and Dark Phoenix were poorly received.

=== 2020–present: Antagonistic characters ===
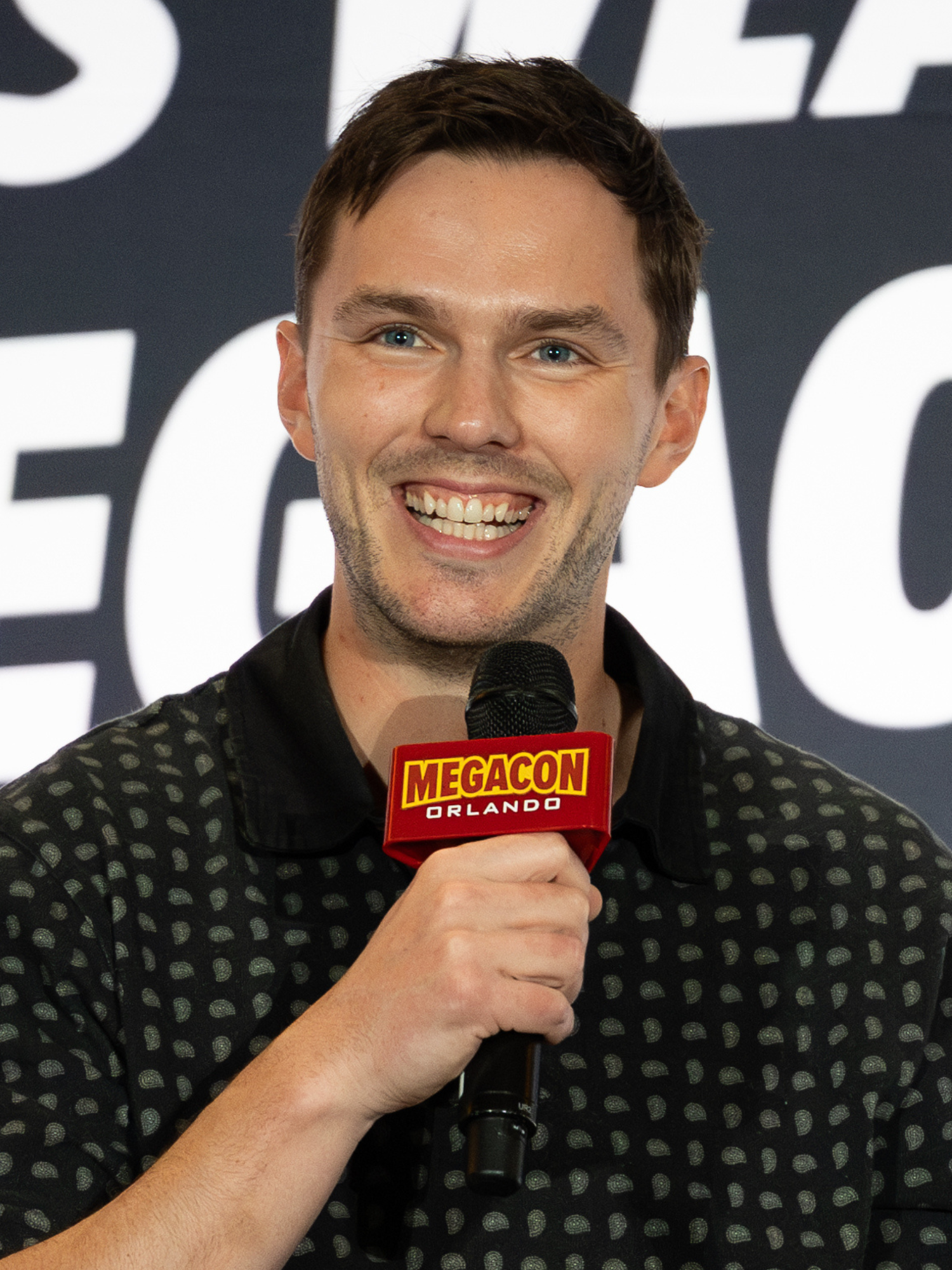
Nicholas Hoult at MegaCon in 2025

The following year, Hoult began starring as Peter III of Russia in the Hulu comedy-drama series The Great. The series and his performance received critical acclaim. He was nominated for two Golden Globe Awards and a Primetime Emmy Award for Outstanding Lead Actor in a Comedy Series. In 2021, Hoult appeared in a villainous role in the thriller Those Who Wish Me Dead. Hoult starred in the black comedy film The Menu in 2022. It received positive reviews. Hoult next played the titular role in the comedy-horror film Renfield. In June 2023, he was invited to join the Academy of Motion Picture Arts and Sciences in the actors branch.

In 2024, Hoult voiced Jon Arbuckle in the animated film The Garfield Movie. That same year, he also starred in the crime thriller The Order (2024), directed by Justin Kurzel, and the courtroom drama Juror #2 (2024), directed by Clint Eastwood. Hoult also starred as Thomas Hutter in Nosferatu, written and directed by Robert Eggers. Hoult appeared as Lex Luthor in Superman (2025) from director James Gunn. Hoult described Luthor as obsessive, determined, and relentless, and wanted the character to feel like a credible threat to Superman. Gunn took inspiration for the character from Brian Azzarello's limited comic book series Lex Luthor: Man of Steel (2005) as well as Jerry Siegel's "reckless scientific genius" version of Luthor in comic books from the 1950s and 1960s.

In 2026, Hoult will star in How to Rob a Bank directed by David Leitch, which tells the story of a bank robbery. He will also star in Tom Ford's Cry to Heaven.

Hoult did a screen test for the role of James Bond in October 2026 for the franchise's upcoming 26th film. The role ultimately went to Robert Pattinson.

In 2027, he will reprise his role as Lex Luthor in Man of Tomorrow, will be part of the voice cast for CoComelon: The Movie, and was announced to play Gilderoy Lockhart in the second season of the HBO show Harry Potter before being replaced by Kit Harington due to scheduling conflicts. Hoult received backlash after the announcement of his involvement with Harry Potter due to the transphobic views of the author of the Harry Potter novels, J. K. Rowling.

== Personal life ==
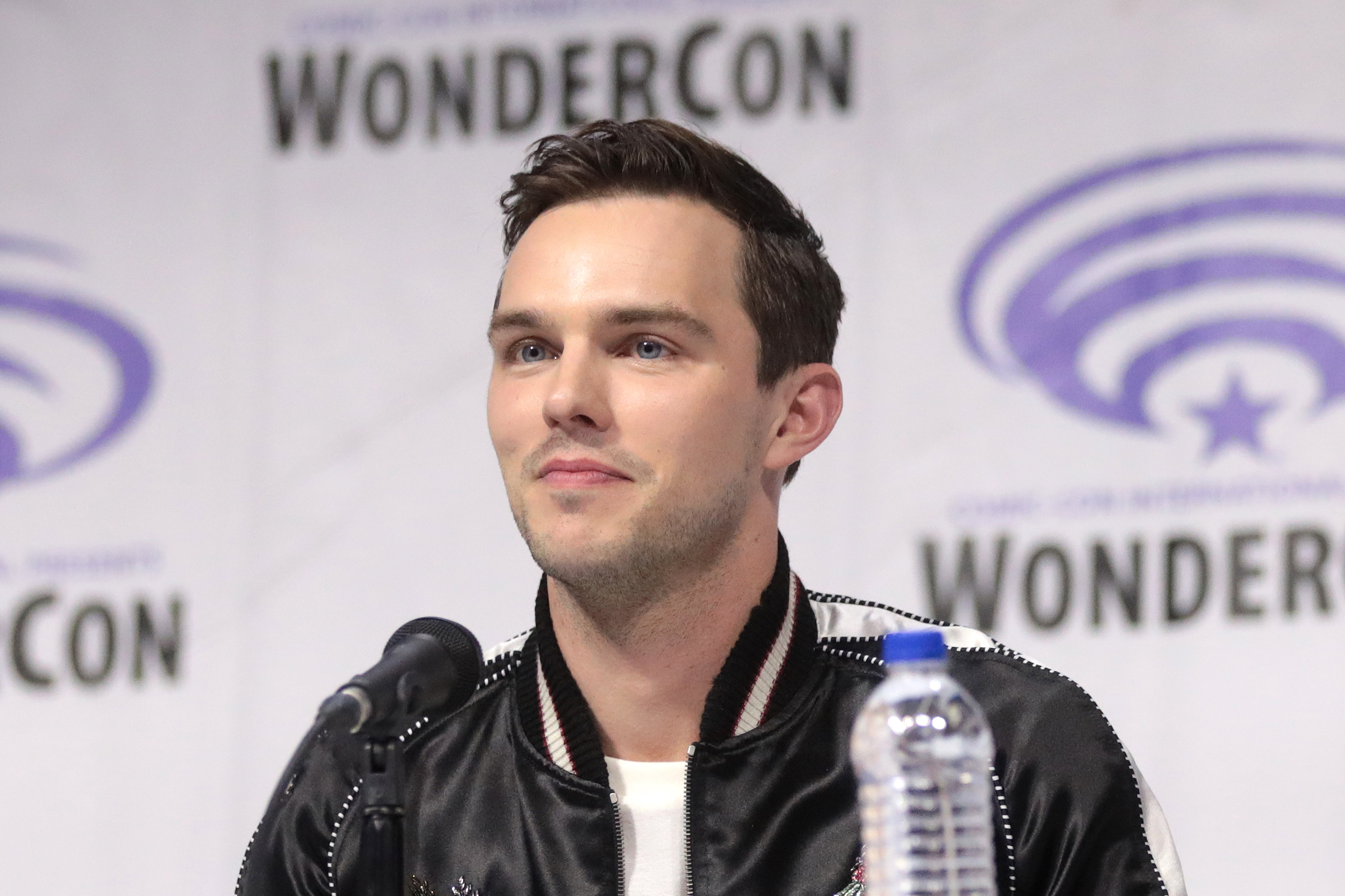
Hoult at the 2019 WonderCon

Hoult divides his time between London and Huntington Beach, California. In his free time, he plays basketball and golf and trains in jiu-jitsu and boxing. He is also an avid fan of Grand Prix motorcycle racing and Formula One and has been spotted at various Grand Prix events over the years. Hoult graduated from Ferrari's Corso Pilota driving school in 2022 and has competed in multiple Ferrari Challenge events. In 2024, he won the "Track Attack" at Watkins Glen with his Ferrari 296 GTB.

During the filming of X-Men: First Class in 2010, Hoult began dating his co-star Jennifer Lawrence. Their relationship ended around the time they wrapped filming X-Men: Days of Future Past in August 2013.

Hoult is the father of four children with American model Bryana Holly, with whom he has been in a relationship since 12 December 2016. Their first child was born in 2018, their second in 2022 and they welcomed twins in 2025. Hoult called Holly his "wife" at the 2024 Governors Awards on 17 November 2024.

Hoult grew up near Reading F.C., but since moving to London from California, he has become an Arsenal fan.

== Philanthropy ==
Hoult is a philanthropist and supports numerous charities; he has been associated with organisations that support children. He was appointed the first National Society for the Prevention of Cruelty to Children (NSPCC) Young Person Ambassador, for supporting the charity's activities aimed at children and young people. Since 2009, he has also been involved with the Teenage Cancer Trust; he continues to visit patients supported by the organisation and has helped promote its awareness campaigns, including the sun-safety campaign "Shunburn". Hoult designed sweaters for Save the Children's and Selfish Mother's joint Christmas Jumper Day campaign. He encouraged customers to buy the festive collection and support the charitable cause, which he thought would bring a "real change to children's lives". He also donated a pair of shoes, which was auctioned by Small Steps Project, an organisation that helps homeless and malnourished children. Hoult was inducted into the NSPCC Hall of Fame in 2010 for his contributions to the campaign against child cruelty.

Hoult visited Nairobi, Kenya, as a part of a Christian Aid project aimed at providing clean water and sanitation. During his stay he met local people and helped clean the locality. He said of his experience; "I met great people making the best of the situation ... it is heart-breaking in many ways to see the living conditions". Hoult also participated in the Rickshaw Run in January 2017, in which participants drove an auto rickshaw (also called a tuk tuk) for 3,000 kilometres (1,900 mi) across India to raise funds for Teenage Cancer Trust and World Wide Fund for Nature. He has also been associated with Jeans for Refugees, a project and fundraising initiative intended to help refugees around the world. He donated a signed pair of jeans to the organisation; profits from the campaign were donated to the refugee support agency International Rescue Committee.

On 1 August 2020, he participated in the Outreach Project campaign alongside Charlize Theron, where the film Mad Max: Fury Road was screened at a drive-in theater in Los Angeles to raise funds. In 2021, for Save the Children UK, he took part in Misan Harriman's campaign to raise awareness about the urgent changes children want to see in the world: "Ban plastic. Reduce pollution." In June 2022, he participated in Biotherm's #BeAWaterLover campaign to raise awareness about ocean preservation and to announce the brand's commitment to becoming Ocean Positive by 2030. In both 2022 and 2023, he championed Armani's Acqua for Life campaign.

In 2025, Hoult was named a Save the Children Ambassador. As part of his new role, he visited an after-school workshop in London, where he spoke with children about topics related to his role as Lex Luthor in Superman (2025) and promoted values such as compassion and responsibility. As an ambassador, Hoult supports the organisation's initiatives focused on education, health, and child welfare at a global level.

== Awards and nominations ==
Award	Year (Note: Indicates the year in which the ceremony was held. Where available, the year is linked to the article for the specific ceremony.)	Category	Nominated work	Result	Ref.
Actor Awards	2021	Outstanding Performance by a Male Actor in a Comedy Series	The Great	Nominated	
Actor Awards	2021	Outstanding Performance by an Ensemble in a Comedy Series	The Great (Note: Shared with the cast)	Nominated	
Actor Awards	2022	Outstanding Performance by an Ensemble in a Comedy Series	The Great	Nominated	
Astra TV Awards	2022	Best Actor in a Streaming Series, Comedy	The Great	Nominated	
Astra TV Awards	2024	Best Actor in a Streaming Series, Comedy	The Great	Nominated	
British Academy Film Awards	2010	Rising Star Award	—N/a	Nominated	
Critics' Choice Movie Awards	2003	Best Young Actor	About a Boy	Nominated	
Critics' Choice Movie Awards	2019	Best Acting Ensemble	The Favourite	Won	
Critics' Choice Super Awards	2026	Best Actor in a Superhero Movie	Superman	Nominated	
Critics' Choice Super Awards	2026	Best Villain in a Movie	Superman	Nominated	
Critics' Choice Television Awards	2021	Best Actor in a Comedy Series	The Great	Nominated	
Critics' Choice Television Awards	2022	Best Actor in a Comedy Series	The Great	Nominated	
Florida Film Critics Circle	2018	Best Ensemble	The Favourite	Won	
Golden Globe Awards	2021	Best Actor – Television Series Musical or Comedy	The Great	Nominated	
Golden Globe Awards	2022	Best Actor – Television Series Musical or Comedy	The Great	Nominated	
Golden Nymph Awards	2008	Best Actor in a Drama Series	Skins	Nominated	
London Film Critics' Circle	2025	British/Irish Performer of the Year	Juror #2 / Nosferatu / The Order	Nominated	
MTV Movie & TV Awards	2021	Best Villain	The Great	Nominated	
Nickelodeon Kids' Choice Awards	2017	#Squad	X-Men: Apocalypse	Nominated	
People's Choice Awards	2012	Favorite Ensemble Movie Cast	X-Men: First Class	Nominated	
Phoenix Film Critics Society	2002	Best Performance by a Youth in a Leading or Supporting Role – Male	About a Boy	Won	
Primetime Emmy Awards	2022	Outstanding Lead Actor in a Comedy Series	The Great	Nominated	
San Diego Film Critics Society	2024	Special Award for Body of Work	Nosferatu / Juror #2 / The Order / The Garfield Movie	Won	
Satellite Awards	2019	Best Cast – Motion Picture	The Favourite	Won	
Satellite Awards	2021	Best Actor in a Musical or Comedy Series	The Great	Nominated	
Savannah Film Festival	2022	Vanguard Award	The Menu	Won	
Seattle Film Critics Society	2025	Villain of the Year	Superman (for his performance as Lex Luthor)	Nominated	
Teen Choice Awards	2011	Choice Movie: Chemistry	X-Men: First Class	Nominated	
Teen Choice Awards	2013	Choice Movie Actor: Comedy	Warm Bodies	Nominated	
Teen Choice Awards	2013	Choice Movie Actor: Romance	Warm Bodies	Nominated	
Teen Choice Awards	2013	Choice Movie: Breakout Star	Warm Bodies	Won	
Teen Choice Awards	2014	Choice Movie: Scene Stealer	X-Men: Days of Future Past	Nominated	
Teen Choice Awards	2015	Choice Movie: Scene Stealer	Mad Max: Fury Road	Nominated	
Young Artist Awards	2003	Best Performance in a Feature Film – Leading Young Actor	About a Boy	Nominated	
Young Hollywood Awards	2014	Super Superhero	X-Men: Days of Future Past	Nominated	
