= Jonathan Abrams (writer) =

American television writer

Jonathan Abrams is an American film and television and theatrical book writer known for writing the Broadway musical The Heart of Rock and Roll. He wrote the original screenplay for the thriller film Juror #2 for Warner Bros. Pictures, which was directed by Clint Eastwood and released on October 27, 2024.

Abrams was raised in San Francisco and is a graduate of the USC School of Cinematic Arts.
