= Warm Bodies =

2010 novel by Isaac Marion

- Author: Isaac Marion
- Language: English
- Genre: Post-apocalyptic fiction, gothic fiction, paranormal romance, black comedy
- Publication date: October 14, 2010
- Media type: Print, e-book, audiobook
- Pages: 240 pages
- ISBN: 978-0-09-954934-5

Warm Bodies is a paranormal romance novel by author Isaac Marion. Described as a "zombie romance", it makes allusions to William Shakespeare's Romeo and Juliet. The author, based in Seattle, originally wrote a short story titled "I Am a Zombie Filled with Love". Atria Books, a division of Simon & Schuster, acquired the publishing rights to the full novel in early 2010.

== Plot ==
In a post-apocalyptic future, a male zombie still in the early stages of decay lives in a community of the dead in an abandoned airport near the city. He cannot remember his name, and refers to himself as "R". After the collapse of human civilization, zombies hunt for the living, seeking to eat their brains; doing so allows them to relive the memories, feelings, and thoughts of their prey. Zombies whose flesh has completely decayed away are known as "Boneys", which act as "pack leaders" of sorts to the others, who are known as "Fleshies" and still retain traces and behaviors from their previous lives as humans, though R explains that most of the behaviors are done out of force of habit rather than an attempt to "live". R, a Fleshy, is unusual as he shows distaste for eating human flesh, and can form several coherent syllables in one breath, and collects various objects from the outside world that he hoards in his "house", a Boeing 747 airliner parked at the airport.

In a hunt, R feeds on the brain of a young man named Perry. After experiencing his memories, R sees Perry's girlfriend Julie, and in a moment of mercy, saves her from the others. He disguises her scent with zombie blood, and takes her home where he hides her in the 747 airplane. He slowly gains Julie's trust, and convinces her to stay for a while until the others forget about her. R feeds her food from the airport's restaurant, entertains her with his treasures, including a record player, and Julie tries to teach him to drive a car which R has managed to get started. She also tells him a little bit about her life. In time, R begins feeling guilty over killing Perry, but continues to eat the remains of his brain, seeing it as a rare treasure, and experiences many of Perry's memories.

Julie is attacked by several zombies, and R helps her fend them off. His fellow zombie M is confused and angered by his behavior, but relents his attack. However, several Boneys, attracted by the noise, arrive, and one of them shows R some old photos of the dead and living fighting each other, telling him that they need to maintain the status quo. They leave along with the rest, and R takes Julie back to the airplane. In the morning, Julie convinces R to take her home, and they leave while the dead watch them. The Boneys attack and try to kill Julie, but with M's help, they get away in R's car. On the way to the city, they camp out in a suburban house, and Julie allows R to share a bed with her. The next morning, Julie calls her father, and sends R out for fuel. When he returns, Julie is gone. R begins walking back to the airport in a heavy rainstorm, and feels cold for the first time since he "died". On the road, R runs into M and some other zombies who have been chased out by the Boneys. M explains that, ever since the confrontation with the Boneys in the airport, the zombies have been changing like R, and experiencing things such as dreams and old memories. R decides to go after Julie, and follows her scent to an abandoned stadium converted into a large community for human survivors, led by Julie's father Grigio. After disguising himself as a human, R locates Julie's house and sees her on her balcony, and they reunite. R has further visions of Perry's memory; some form of Perry's soul is living inside R, and has intertwined with R's own. He also realizes that Perry and Julie had started to become distant from each other shortly before Perry's death, largely due to Perry beginning to lose his will to live.

During a party in the community, R becomes intoxicated, and, no longer able to control his zombie instincts, attacks a guard, infecting him and causing a small outbreak in the stadium. Grigio discovers R, and, deducing what he is, attacks him despite Julie's protests, but is stopped by Julie's friend Nora, allowing Julie and R to escape. Outside, the crowd of zombies has grown. What Julie and R have between them has infected many others, causing them to change and seek to regain their humanity. However, as they deliberate on what to do next, the Boneys attack both the Living and Fleshies alike. The couple meets up with Nora, and they flee to a roof where they see the battle between the Boneys and the Living. As they watch, Julie has an epiphany: the plague started because the human race crushed itself beneath the weight of its negative emotions, until it released a dark force that changed the humans so that everyone could see their evil. In the midst of the chaos and bloodshed, R and Julie kiss; the strength of their love cures R of the plague completely and both their eyes turn gold. Grigio, not believing that a cure for the plague exists and thinking that R has infected Julie, attempts to kill them both, but is stopped by one of his own soldiers and attacked by a Boney. As Julie shoots the Boney, both it and Grigio fall off the roof of the stadium shriveling into dust and bones. The action apparently causes the rest of the Boneys to flee, and the battle ends with the Living and Dead establishing peace. The epilogue reveals that in the aftermath of the battle, the word about the origins of the plague was spread among the other surviving communities, allowing for a true chance at a cure, and R looks forward to what the future now brings, for the Living and the Dead both.

== Reviews ==
Paste Magazine said, "Marion explores the meaning of humanity through R's journey towards personhood, a tale that gets grander in scale as his empathy builds and the book's true villains—cynicism, apathy and status quo—are revealed."

== Related books ==
=== Prequel ===
On January 28, 2013, Zola Books published Isaac Marion's novella e-book prequel to Warm Bodies, titled The New Hunger. Library Journal praised its "rich, evocative prose". Cinema Blend gave a mostly positive review, remarking that it "feels more like an add-on to Warm Bodies than a self-contained story" but stating that fans of Warm Bodies would enjoy the novella.

=== Sequel ===
On October 15, 2012, Marion announced via his blog that he was writing a sequel. Three years later, he announced that the project had grown into two books, making the series four books in total. The first of these, titled The Burning World, was released on February 7, 2017, and Marion launched an elaborate campaign to encourage preordering through his own web store, creating original story materials as rewards. Marion self-published a limited run of the final book in the series, The Living, on November 13, 2018.

== Adaptations ==
=== Film ===
Actor Nicholas Hoult starred as the zombie R in a feature film adaptation written and directed by Jonathan Levine and released in February 2013. The film also starred Teresa Palmer as Julie Grigio, Rob Corddry as M, and John Malkovich as General Grigio. Other principal cast members included Dave Franco, Analeigh Tipton, and Cory Hardrict. In the film, Julie's father is not killed and though a stadium is used for certain scenes, a city barred with walls replaces it as the humans' primary residence. The official movie poster in which R was giving Julie a bunch of flowers is not included in the movie but happened in the novel. There were also cut-scenes that were not included in the officially released movie that changed the flow of the story.

=== Television ===
In May 2019, a Warm Bodies television series adaptation was announced to be in development, produced by Lionsgate.
