= Isaac Marion =

American writer (born 1981)

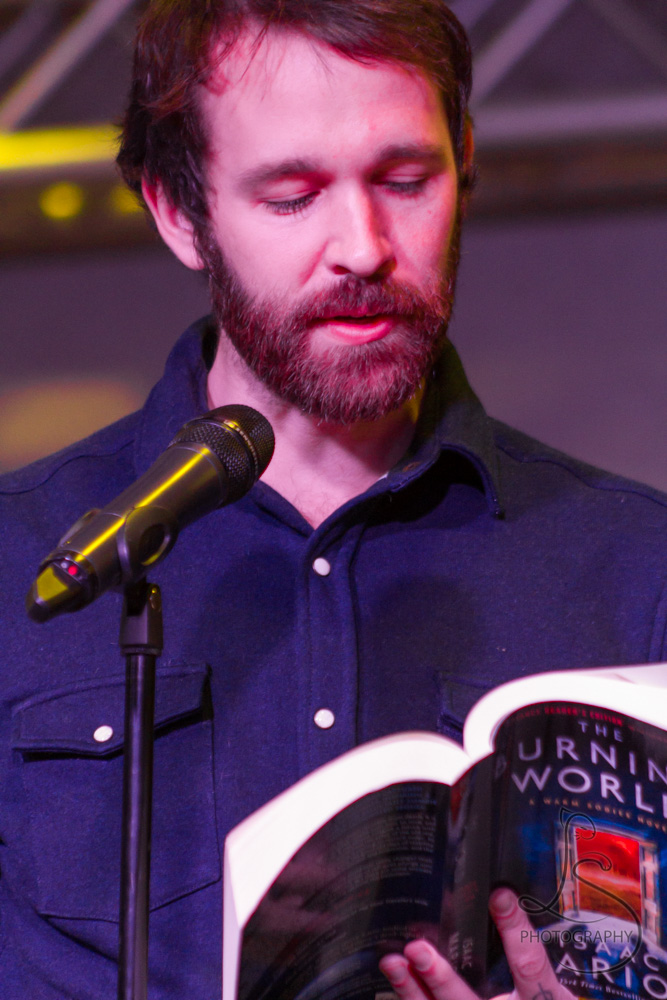
- Isaac Marion at 2016 Newcon PDX
- Occupations: Novelist, musician
- Writing career
- Language: English
- Notable work: Warm Bodies series
- Website: isaacmarion.com

Isaac Marion is an American writer. He is best known as the best-selling author of the "zombie romance" novel Warm Bodies and its series.

== Background ==
Marion was born near Seattle. Once based in Portland, he now lives in the country with his cat and posts regularly to his YouTube channel.

== Career ==
Before Warm Bodies, Marion had self-published three other novels. Warm Bodies was published by Atria Books on October 14, 2010. It received critical acclaim from publications such as The Guardian, The Seattle Times and Paste and authors Audrey Niffenegger and Stephenie Meyer. Summit Entertainment acquired the rights to the novel, and it has been made into the film Warm Bodies, written and directed by Jonathan Levine and starring Nicholas Hoult, Teresa Palmer and John Malkovich. The movie was released on February 1, 2013. It grossed 116 million dollars in the international box office.

Marion released a prequel novella, The New Hunger, in 2015, published by Emily Bestler Books in the US and Vintage in the UK. The first true sequel, The Burning World, was released by Emily Bestler Books in 2017. The Seattle Times called it "a thrilling coast-to-coast journey". The Bellingham Herald called it "a richly imagined philosophical journey." Kirkus Reviews noted that "Marion has ambitiously expanded on his original idea." The Stranger called it, "Poignant and poetic...brings zombie lit back from the dead."

Despite critical acclaim and a 4.5 star average review on Amazon, sales of The Burning World were disappointing, with many fans reporting that bookstores were not stocking it at all during its initial release. Marion has hinted at a publisher "fumble" that may have caused this but has not revealed details.

Marion had already written the final book in the series, The Living, but due to these low sales Emily Bestler Books refused to publish it. Marion chose to release The Living independently through a startup distributor, Zola Books. After selling this limited run of hardcovers, The Living is currently listed as "out of print" and only available as an ebook. Marion has stated he has no plans to release a paperback edition until he finds a publisher to pick it up.

Marion has published three short stories with the literary nonprofit organization Tethered By Letters. He contributed a story, "The Girl on the Table" to Nights of the Living Dead, an anthology based on the original George Romero film. His story "What Mike Saw" appeared in Weird Tales.

Marion spent over three years writing his newest novel, The Overnoise, which is currently on submission.

=== Music ===
Besides writing books, Marion also writes music. He has a 2007 solo album, Dead Children (released under the name "Isaac Marion's Moon Colony"), which he considers a companion piece to Warm Bodies. He was also part of a brief electronic/indie rock duo named The Tallest Building in the World, with guitarist Jared McSharry. The pair released their lone concept album, Look Down, in 2005. Both albums have been made available to download by Marion via Bandcamp.

== Personal life ==
Marion is also a photographer and a painter. According to his Simon & Schuster biography, Marion decided "to forgo college in favor of direct experience." He began writing while still in high school, and self-published three novels before Warm Bodies.
