= Juror No. 2 =

2024 film by Clint Eastwood

Juror #2
- Theatrical release poster
- Directed by: Clint Eastwood
- Written by: Jonathan Abrams
- Produced by: Clint Eastwood; Tim Moore; Jessica Meier; Adam Goodman; Matt Skiena
- Starring: Nicholas Hoult; Toni Collette; J. K. Simmons; Kiefer Sutherland
- Cinematography: Yves Bélanger
- Edited by: Joel Cox; David Cox
- Music by: Mark Mancina
- Production companies: Dichotomy Films; Malpaso Productions
- Distributed by: Warner Bros. Pictures
- Release dates: October 27, 2024 (AFI Fest); November 1, 2024 (United States)
- Running time: 114 minutes
- Country: United States
- Language: English
- Budget: $35 million
- Box office: $27 million

Juror #2 is a 2024 American legal thriller film co-produced and directed by Clint Eastwood (in his final film as director before retirement) and written by Jonathan Abrams. The film stars Nicholas Hoult, Toni Collette, J. K. Simmons, and Kiefer Sutherland. In the film, a man serving on the jury of a high-profile murder trial realizes that he may be responsible for the victim's death.

Juror #2 had its world premiere at AFI Fest on October 27, 2024, and was released in the United States by Warner Bros. Pictures on November 1, 2024. The film received positive reviews from critics and was named one of the Top 10 Films of 2024 by the National Board of Review.

== Plot ==
In Savannah, Georgia, journalist and recovering alcoholic Justin Kemp is called for jury duty, which he tries to excuse himself from as his wife, Ally, is approaching her due date in a high-risk pregnancy after a previous miscarriage. He is seated in the case of the death of Kendall Carter who, a year prior, had a fight with her boyfriend, James Sythe, at a bar and was later found dead under a bridge; Sythe is charged with her murder.

Hoping to attract voters with a high-profile domestic violence conviction in her run for district attorney, Faith Killebrew acts as prosecutor. Witnesses confirm that Sythe was drunk and disorderly on the night in question and that he followed Kendall after she stormed off. The coroner testifies that her injuries were consistent with a battery by a blunt instrument, character witnesses attest Sythe had a history of violence, and an eyewitness claims to have seen Sythe at the location from which Kendall's body was thrown.

Justin realizes he might have killed Kendall himself: on the night of her death, he was at the same bar as the couple and, when later driving home, he hit something with his car and got out to see what it was, but he assumed it was a deer and kept driving. Concerned that an innocent man might be convicted, Justin seeks advice from his Alcoholics Anonymous sponsor Larry, a defense attorney, who tells him that if he comes forward he would likely be prosecuted and convicted, as no one would believe he was sober because of his previous DUI convictions. Justin resolves to argue for a not-guilty verdict, using his own sobriety story to show that Sythe is capable of change.

Most of the jurors favor a conviction at first, but at Justin's suggestion, fellow juror Harold, a retired detective, argues in favor of examining the facts more closely, citing that the eyewitness testimony could have been skewed by confirmation bias. Another juror notes that there would have been low visibility and another, a medical student, points out that Kendall's injuries could have been the result of a hit and run driver. More jurors begin to agree with this theory, which causes Justin to fear he may be identified as the killer. Harold breaks jury rules by collecting data on body-shop visits following Kendall's death, which includes Justin's car. Justin strategically reveals Harold's research to the judge, who removes Harold from the jury.

Realizing law enforcement officers had primed the eyewitness to identify Sythe at trial, Killebrew grows conflicted about the case and visits the owners of the vehicles on the repair records. Justin's vehicle is on the list but is registered to Ally, who parrots his cover story to Killebrew. Ally later confronts Justin about this and he admits to have been in the bar that night - the due date of the twins they lost to an earlier miscarriage - but did not drink. Now realizing Justin's possible involvement in the death, Ally agrees that he must do what he can to protect their family. Justin tells Larry the trial is headed for a hung jury, but Larry cautions that, as Killebrew has tied the case to her election campaign, Sythe could be re-tried and forcing a mistrial will not save him.

With one juror adamant he will not change his guilty vote, Justin convinces the rest to vote to convict and is not present when the verdict is given. After Sythe is sentenced to life without parole, Killebrew discovers Justin is Ally's husband and confronts him. When she argues that Sythe has been convicted of a crime he is innocent of while the real perpetrator goes free, Justin implores her to leave the case alone, countering that Sythe had a history of violence while he, "a good man", would see his life and family destroyed, adding that Kendall's death was unintentional and that admitting she tried the wrong man could harm her chances at becoming DA. Ally gives birth to their baby and Justin sells his car to remove any connection to the crime; he starts to feel relieved and ready to move on from the case, until Killebrew arrives at his doorstep.

== Cast ==
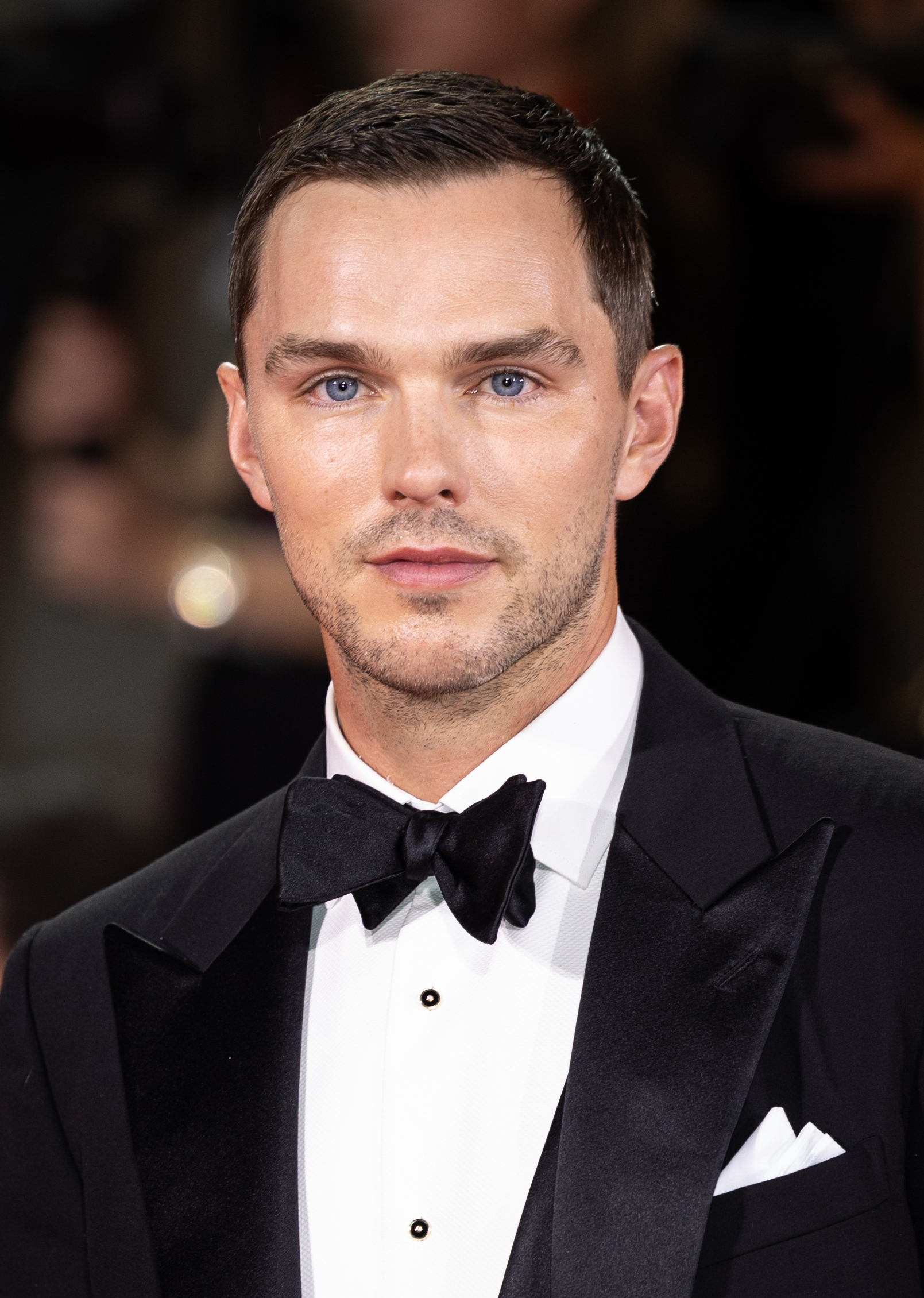
Nicholas Hoult plays the eponymous juror.

- Nicholas Hoult as Justin Kemp, a journalist called up for jury duty
- Toni Collette as Faith Killebrew, the Assistant District Attorney prosecuting the Carter case
- J. K. Simmons as Harold, a former homicide detective and juror
- Chris Messina as Eric Resnick, the public defender who represents Sythe
- Gabriel Basso as James Michael Sythe, the suspect
- Zoey Deutch as Allison Crewson, Kemp's wife and a local schoolteacher
- Cedric Yarbrough as Marcus, a juror
- Leslie Bibb as Denice Aldworth, the jury foreperson
- Kiefer Sutherland as Larry Lasker, a lawyer and Kemp's Alcoholics Anonymous sponsor
- Amy Aquino as Judge Thelma Hollub (nameplate prop, throughout the film, says "Thelma Stewart")
- Adrienne C. Moore as Yolanda, a juror

== Production ==
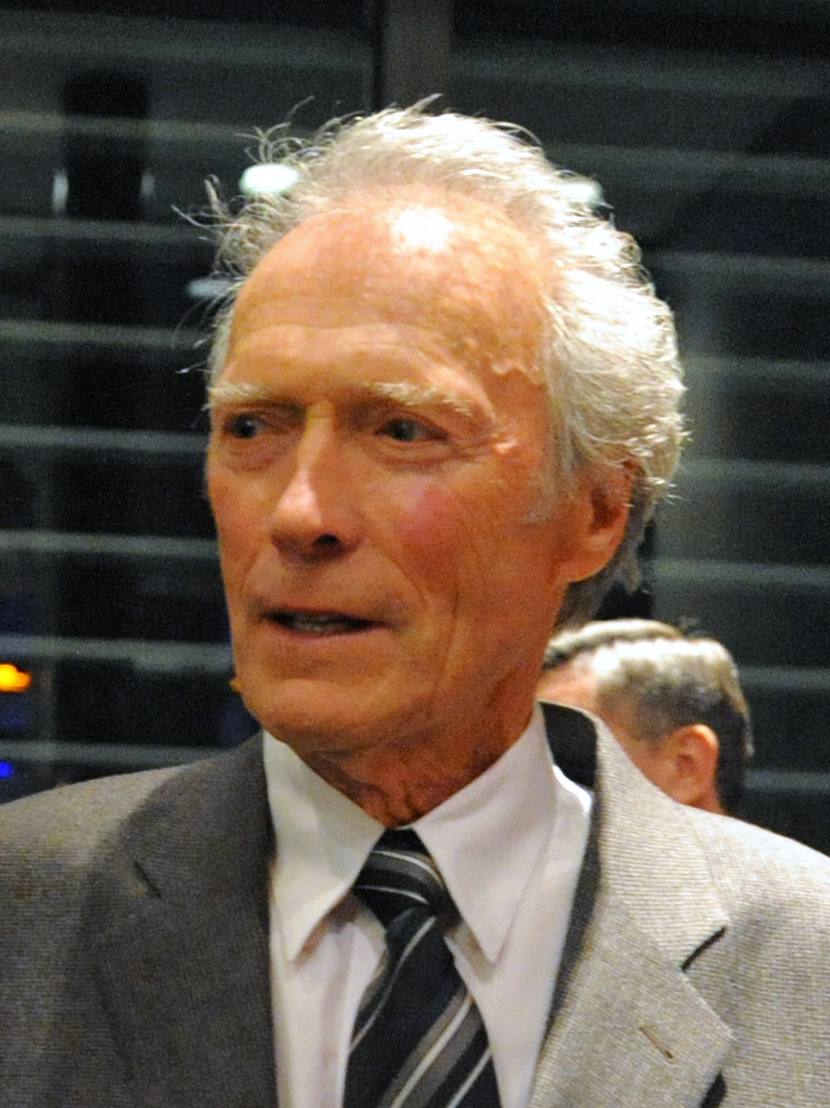
Clint Eastwood was 93 years old when production began for Juror #2.

It was announced in April 2023 that filmmaker Clint Eastwood had set the project as his next film, with Nicholas Hoult and Toni Collette in negotiations to star. They were confirmed the following month, with Zoey Deutch and Kiefer Sutherland also joining the cast, and Gabriel Basso entering negotiations for a role. In June, Leslie Bibb was added to the cast. In November, Chris Messina joined the cast while Basso was confirmed. J. K. Simmons, Amy Aquino, Adrienne C. Moore, Cedric Yarbrough, Chikako Fukuyama, Onix Serrano and Francesca Eastwood were added in December.

Collette and Hoult reunited 22 years after playing mother and son in About a Boy (2002). This was the second time working together for Deutch and Hoult, after the film Rebel in the Rye (2017).

Production began in June 2023, when Eastwood was 93 years old, with filming locations including Savannah, Georgia, and Los Angeles, before it was suspended in July due to the 2023 SAG-AFTRA strike. Production resumed in November upon the conclusion of the strike. Post-production had wrapped by April 2024. Mark Mancina composed the score for the film; he previously worked on Eastwood's Cry Macho (2021). It was the final film Eastwood directed before his retirement in 2026.

== Release ==
Juror #2 premiered as the closing film of the 38th edition of the film festival AFI Fest on October 27, 2024; the event continues a long-standing relationship between Eastwood and the American Film Institute (AFI), which previously launched the world premieres of American Sniper (2014), J. Edgar (2011), and Richard Jewell (2019) at the festival.

Warner Bros. Pictures initially envisioned Juror #2 as a direct-to-streaming release on Max. However, Warner Bros. gave the film a limited release on November 1, 2024. The film was released in fewer than 50 domestic theaters, and Warner Bros. was expected to not report box office results. Variety characterized Warner Bros.' decision to deny the film a wide release as "a peculiar approach for a filmmaker who still has commercial appeal", noting that Eastwood had been making films for Warner Bros. for 50 years and was still delivering major commercial successes, including American Sniper (2014), Sully (2016), and The Mule (2018). Vulture's Bilge Ebiri suggested that Warner Bros.' decision implied deep problems with the modern-day studio system, suggesting that "Eastwood, for all his genre cred and iconic stature, is one of the few major filmmakers left making studio-financed adult dramas. To the modern studio executive, he must look like a glitch in the matrix – not an artist to be protected, but an error to be corrected."

The film's atypical release entailed Warner Bros. announcing that the film would debut on Max on December 20, 2024, branded as a Max original. A spokesperson for the studio claimed that a direct-to-streaming release was the original intent, and that they agreed with the filmmakers to reconsider a limited theatrical run in order to generate word-of-mouth ahead of the Max release.

The film received a wide release in the UK, showing at more than 300 cinemas nationwide.

Juror #2 was released on DVD and Blu-ray by Warner Bros. Home Entertainment on February 4, 2025.

== Reception ==
=== Box office ===
In the United States, the film opened in 35 theaters and grossed an estimated $90,000 on its first day and $260–270,000 over the weekend; Warner Bros. did not report official numbers, to reportedly "save face" for Eastwood "by avoiding any negative box office headlines". Internationally, the film grossed $5 million from six territories in its opening weekend, including $3.1 million in France, where the film also received good reviews from critics.

=== Critical response ===
On the review aggregator website Rotten Tomatoes, 93% of 175 critics' reviews are positive, with an average rating of 7.3/10. The website's consensus reads: "A legal thriller with a heavy conscience, Juror #2 is less a summation of Clint Eastwood's storied directorial career than another terrific reminder of his knack for plain-spoken drama." Metacritic, which uses a weighted average, assigned the film a score of 72 out of 100, based on 37 critics, indicating "generally favorable" reviews.

Vulture's Bilge Ebiri commented that Juror #2 inverts many tropes of the courtroom drama genre, writing that while in an ordinary legal thriller, "the system usually prevailed" and "justice would be served, even if it took a few extra tries", Eastwood's drama is a film "about how the system can fail even as everybody tries their best". He added that Eastwood's perspective is mirrored by his "own growing cynicism about the effectiveness of [government and legal] institutions".

Several critics noted that Juror #2 did not fit a traditional political narrative. IndieWire's Christian Zilko called the film "one of the best studio films of 2024", writing that while the film "introduces a reverence for law, order, and due process that seems to suit a lifelong conservative, it eventually reveals a more apolitical patriotism that's uniquely Eastwoodian". The New Yorker's Richard Brody agreed that while Eastwood is "one of the most distinctive and original political filmmakers ... the politics [the film] brings to life is essentially, and forcefully, anti-political ... Eastwood treats celebrity as a diabolical tool and sees the gap between publicity and reality as a trap door to hell". The Neue Zürcher Zeitung commented that Juror #2 could be read as a parable of America's political divide, in which Sythe, a representative of Donald Trump's blue-collar voting base, is being judged by Kemp, a representative of the progressive elite, who realizes he may have been blind to his own offenses.

The New York Times' Manohla Dargis praised the film and Hoult's performance, but commented that the visuals were more functional than impressive. Peter Debruge of Variety added that while "as always, Eastwood respects our intelligence", the film "ranks among his quietest films, forgoing spectacle in favor of self-reflection".

Filmmakers Luca Guadagnino, Lance Oppenheim, and Whit Stillman all cited Juror #2 as among their favorite films of 2024.

=== Accolades ===
Award	Date of ceremony	Category	Recipient(s)	Result	Ref.
AACTA International Awards	February 7, 2025	Best Supporting Actress	Toni Collette	Nominated	
CEC Awards	February 3, 2025	Best Foreign Film	Juror #2	Nominated	
Columbus Film Critics Association	January 2, 2025	Actor of the Year (for an exemplary body of work)	Nicholas Hoult	Runner-up (Note: Also for The Garfield Movie, Nosferatu, and The Order)	
Georgia Film Critics Association	January 8, 2025	Oglethorpe Award for Excellence in Georgia Cinema	Clint Eastwood and Jonathan Abrams	Won	
Hawaii Film Critics Society	January 13, 2025	Best Overlooked Film	Juror #2	Nominated	
International Cinephile Society	February 9, 2025	Best Picture	Juror #2	19th place	
London Film Critics' Circle	February 2, 2025	British/Irish Performer of the Year	Nicholas Hoult	Nominated (Note: Also for Nosferatu and The Order)	
Michigan Movie Critics Guild	December 9, 2024	Film Excellence	J. K. Simmons	Nominated (Note: Also for Red One and Saturday Night)	
National Board of Review	December 4, 2024	Top Ten Films	Juror #2	Honored	
New Mexico Film Critics	December 15, 2024	Best Actor	Nicholas Hoult	Runner-up	
Oklahoma Film Critics Circle	January 3, 2025	Best Body of Work	Nicholas Hoult	Won	
San Diego Film Critics Society	December 9, 2024	Special Award for Body of Work	Nicholas Hoult	Won	
