= Doug Emmett =

American cinematographer

- Born: U.S.
- Occupation: Cinematographer
- Years active: 2004 - Present

Doug Emmett is an American cinematographer.

== Career ==
Emmett is a graduate of the Kanbar Institute of Film, Television and New Media of the Tisch School of the Arts at New York University.

He is a member of the International Cinematographers Guild (IATSE Local 600) and the Directors Guild of America.

He has worked on music videos for Vampire Weekend, Father John Misty, Weezer, Nasty Cherry and more.

Ref.:

== Filmography ==
=== Feature film ===
Year	Title	Director
2004	The Midnight Shorts Collection (Note: Shared credit with Kevin Anderton, Paul Buhl and David Kornfeld)	Kevin Anderton
2010	Fighting Fish	Annette Apitz
2010	Monogamy	Dana Adam Shapiro
2011	Loveless	Ramin Serry
2011	Damsels in Distress	Whit Stillman
2012	28 Hotel Rooms	Matt Ross
2012	Bachelorette	Leslye Headland
2012	The Giant Mechanical Man	Lee Kirk
2012	Refuge	Jessica Goldberg
2012	Paranormal Activity 4	Henry Joost; Ariel Schulman
2013	The To Do List	Maggie Carey
2014	Alex of Venice	Chris Messina
2014	The One I Love	Charlie McDowell
2014	The Remaining	Casey La Scala
2016	The Edge of Seventeen	Kelly Fremon Craig
2017	We Don't Belong Here	Peer Pedersen
2017	Thumper	Jordan Ross
2018	Sorry to Bother You	Boots Riley
2020	Unpregnant	Rachel Lee Goldenberg
2020	I Care a Lot	J Blakeson
2022	Breaking	Abi Damaris Corbin
2024	The American Society of Magical Negroes	Kobi Libii
2025	Swiped	Rachel Lee Goldenberg

=== Television ===
Year	Title	Director	Notes
2010	30 for 30	Adam Kurland; Lucas Jansen	Segment Silly Little Game
2012	Talhotblond	Courteney Cox	TV movie
2014-2015	Faking It	Jamie Travis; Claire Scanlon; Joe Nussbaum; Lee Rose; Erin Ehrlich	16 episodes
2016	Togetherness	Mark Duplass; Jay Duplass	Season 2
2016	Speechless	Christine Gernon	Episode "P-i-Pilot"
2017-2019	Room 104		23 episodes; Also directed episode "The Internet"
2018	The Rookie	Liz Friedlander	Episode "Pilot"
2021	Truth Be Told	Rosemary Rodriguez	Episode "Ghosts at the Feast"
2021	On the Verge	Julie Delpy; Mathieu Demy; David Petrarca	9 episodes
2024	Presumed Innocent	Greg Yaitanes	5 episodes
2025	Hal & Harper	Cooper Raiff	Episodes "Pilot" and "Going to Each Other"

Miniseries

Year	Title	Director	Notes
2022	Angelyne	Matt Spicer; Lucy Tcherniak	With Tod Campbell
2026	His & Hers	Anja Marquardt	3 episodes
