= Anton Yelchin =

American actor (1989–2016)

- Антон Ельчин
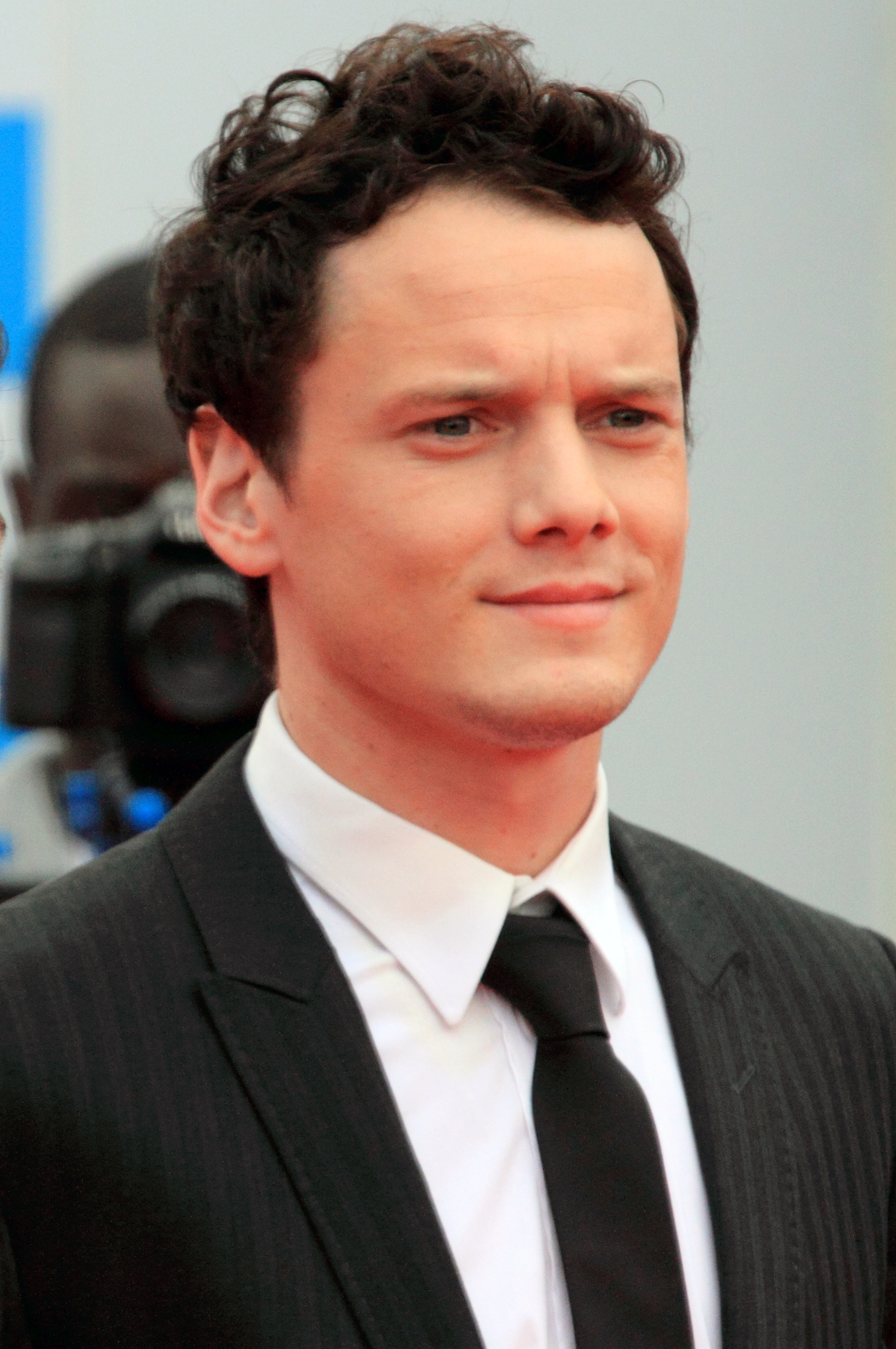
- Yelchin in 2011
- Born: March 11, 1989; Leningrad, Soviet Union (now Saint Petersburg, Russia)
- Died: June 19, 2016 (aged 27); Los Angeles, California, U.S.
- Resting place: Hollywood Forever Cemetery, Los Angeles, California, U.S.
- Occupation: Actor
- Years active: 2000–2016
- Relatives: Eugene Yelchin (uncle)
- Website: antonyelchinofficial.com

Anton Viktorovich Yelchin (Russian: Антон Викторович Ельчин, IPA: [ɐnˈton ˈvʲiktərəvʲɪtɕ ˈjelʲtɕɪn]; March 11, 1989 – June 19, 2016) was an American actor. Born in the Soviet Union to a Russian Jewish family, he emigrated to the United States with his parents at the age of six months. He began his career as a child actor, appearing as the lead of the mystery drama film Hearts in Atlantis (2001) and a series regular on the Showtime comedy-drama Huff (2004–2006). Yelchin landed higher-profile film roles in 2009, portraying Pavel Chekov in the Star Trek reboot and Kyle Reese in Terminator Salvation. He reprised his role as Chekov in the sequels Star Trek Into Darkness (2013) and Star Trek Beyond (2016).

Yelchin frequently worked on independent and lower-profile films, headlining the romantic drama Like Crazy (2011), the 2011 remake of Fright Night, the supernatural thriller Odd Thomas (2013), the romance 5 to 7 (2014), the horror comedy Burying the Ex (2014), the neo-noir The Driftless Area (2015), and the horror thriller Green Room (2015). As a voice actor, he voiced Clumsy Smurf in the live-action Smurfs films (2011–2013) and lead role James "Jim" Lake Jr. on the Netflix animated series Trollhunters: Tales of Arcadia (2016–2018). He maintained an active career until his accidental death in 2016, when he was fatally injured by his SUV.

== Early life and education ==
Yelchin was born on March 11, 1989, in Leningrad, Russian SFSR, Soviet Union. His parents, Irina Korina and Viktor Yelchin, were pair figure skaters who were stars of the Leningrad Ice Ballet for 15 years. His family is Jewish, and were subjected to religious and political oppression in the Soviet Union. Yelchin said that his grandparents "suffered in ways [he] can't even begin to understand under Stalin". Nationally, Yelchin's parents were the third-ranked pair team; they thus qualified for the 1972 Winter Olympics, but were not permitted to participate by the Soviet authorities. Yelchin said the reason was unclear: "I don't exactly know what that was – because they were Jewish or because the KGB didn't want them to travel."

Yelchin's family left for the United States in September 1989, when Anton was six months old, and were thereafter granted refugee status from the Department of State. His mother worked as a figure skating choreographer and his father as a figure skating coach, having been Sasha Cohen's first trainer. Yelchin's uncle is the children's author and painter Eugene Yelchin. In an article published in the Los Angeles Times in December 1989, Yelchin's mother stated, "A woman came up, saw Anton, and said, 'He's beautiful. He will be actor.'" Yelchin stated that he "wasn't very good" at figure skating, his parents' profession.

Yelchin grew up in the San Fernando Valley. He attended the Sherman Oaks Center for Enriched Studies in Tarzana, California, and enrolled at the University of Southern California in the fall of 2007 to study film.

Yelchin was born with cystic fibrosis, though the details of his medical condition were revealed posthumously in 2017 by a foundation established in his name, the Anton Yelchin Foundation.

== Career ==
After his film debut in A Man Is Mostly Water, Yelchin's early roles in both film and television include Delivering Milo, Along Came a Spider, Taken, and House of D. Yelchin played Bobby Garfield in Hearts in Atlantis (2001), for which he received a Young Artist Award for Best Performance in a Feature Film: Leading Young Actor in 2002.

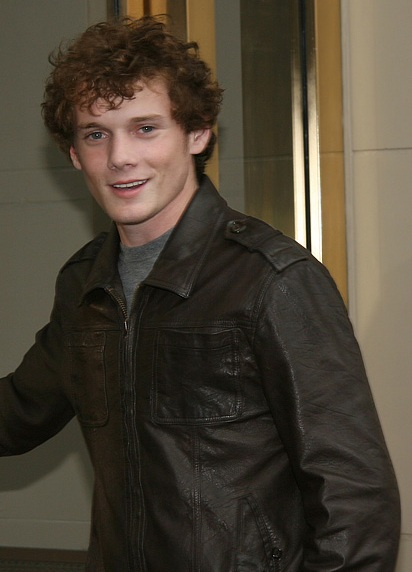
Yelchin at the 2008 Toronto International Film Festival

On Showtime's television series Huff, Yelchin played Byrd Huffstodt, the 14-year-old son of the eponymous character (Hank Azaria). In 2004, he guest-starred in the Season Four episode of Curb Your Enthusiasm as Stewart, Cheryl David's cousin and a self-described magician who knows a card trick. In 2006, he guest-starred in the Law & Order: Criminal Intent episode "Tru Love", as a boy who falls in love with his teacher. He also appeared in the Criminal Minds episode "Sex, Birth & Death" as Nathan Harris, a boy who has murderous urges toward prostitutes and approaches Dr. Spencer Reid to help him before he actually does kill.

In Alpha Dog, Yelchin played Zack Mazursky, a character based on real-life murder victim Nicholas Markowitz. USA Today's review described Yelchin's performance as "heartbreakingly endearing". After the film's premiere, Markowitz's mother praised his portrayal of her son. Yelchin subsequently headlined Fierce People, which received a limited release on September 7, 2007. In 2008, he played the title role in Charlie Bartlett, a film about a wealthy teenager in a public high school. He also appeared alongside the Russian duo t.A.T.u. in the film You and I (which was filmed in Moscow during the summer of 2007) and costarred in Middle of Nowhere.

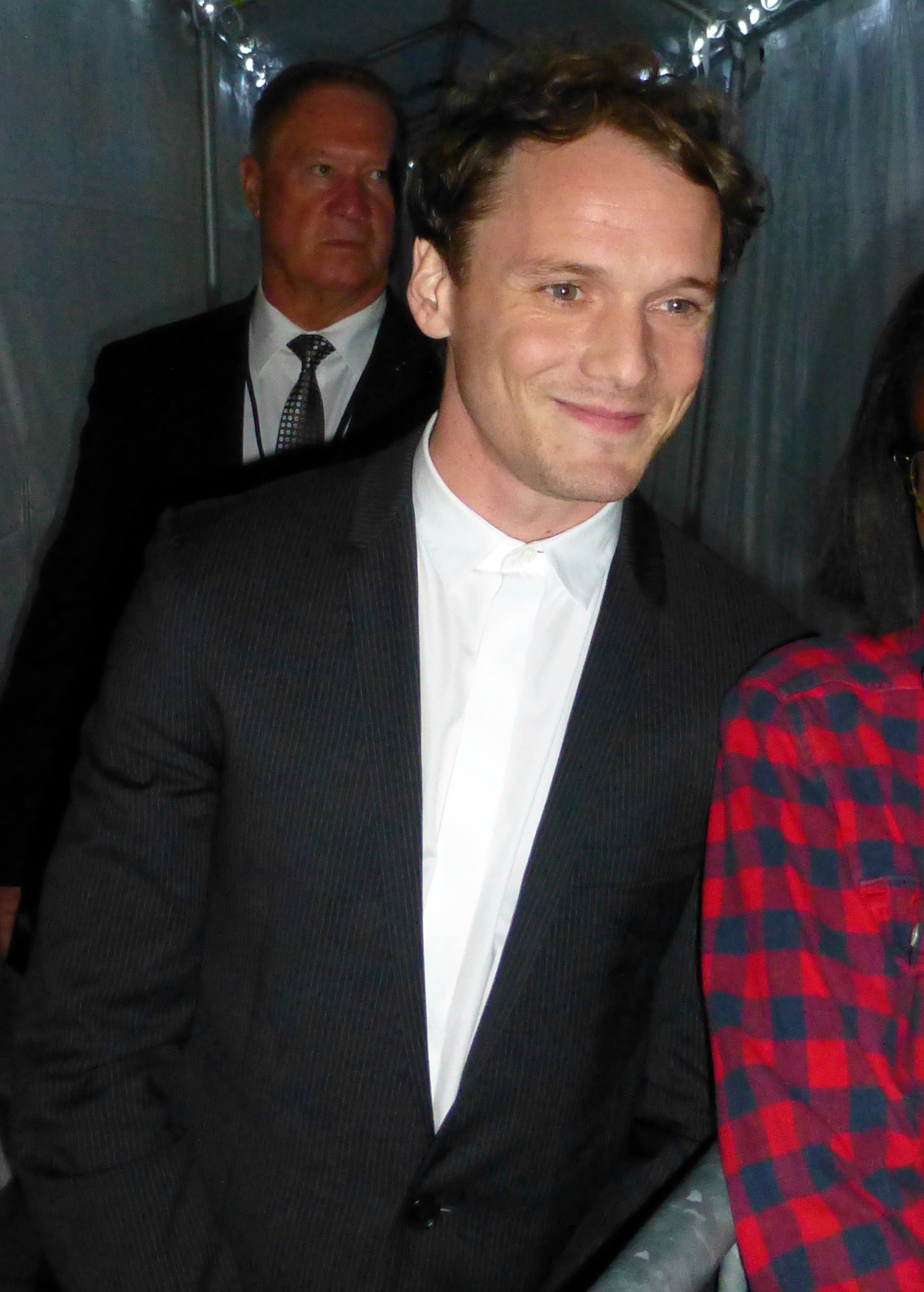
Yelchin at the 2015 Toronto International Film Festival

Yelchin played supporting roles in two blockbuster films released in May 2009: Star Trek, in which he played teenage navigator Pavel Chekov, and Terminator Salvation, in which he played a young Kyle Reese.

In 2011, Yelchin played Charley Brewster in Craig Gillespie's remake film Fright Night, starred in the romantic drama Like Crazy, and voiced Clumsy Smurf in the film adaptation of The Smurfs, as well as its 2013 sequel. He replaced Russell Tovey for the voice role of Albino Pirate in the American version of the animated film The Pirates! In an Adventure with Scientists! (also known as The Pirates! Band of Misfits) (2012). Yelchin voiced Shun in Studio Ghibli's From Up on Poppy Hill.

Yelchin again played the role of Chekov in the 2013 film Star Trek Into Darkness. He also played the lead in the thriller Odd Thomas (2013) as well as the horror comedy Burying the Ex and the romantic film 5 to 7 (both in 2014). In 2015, Yelchin starred in the independent horror film Green Room, which premiered at the Cannes Film Festival that year and received a limited theatrical release in May 2016, and the neo-noir film The Driftless Area.

Shortly before his death, Yelchin reprised his role as Chekov in Star Trek Beyond, which was released on July 22, 2016. He also completed filming several independent films that were released posthumously. Yelchin also recorded the voice role of Jim Lake Jr. on Guillermo del Toro's Trollhunters: Tales of Arcadia.

== Personal life ==
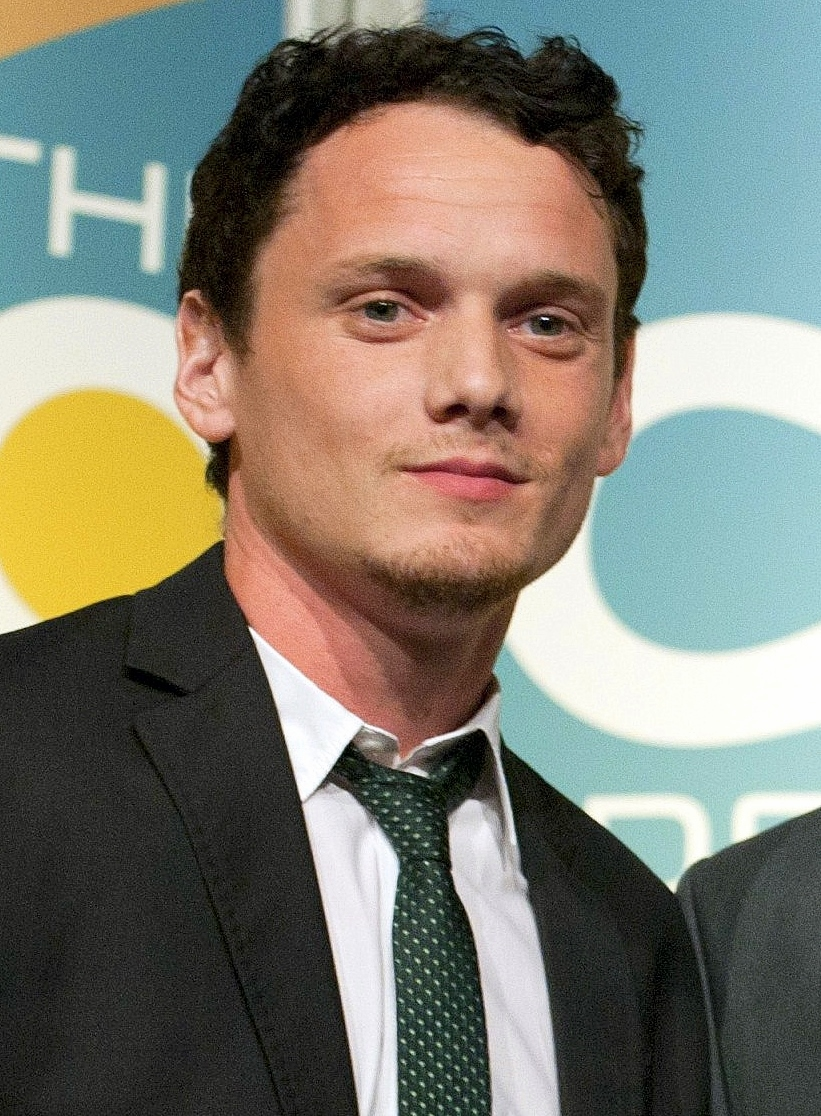
Yelchin in 2011

Yelchin enjoyed playing guitar, which he said gave him fulfillment, and was a fan of acoustic blues music. He once played for a punk band called The Hammerheads.

He was also interested in photography. In January 2018, an exhibit of Yelchin's photography entitled Anton Yelchin: Provocative Beauty was displayed at New York City's De Buck Gallery. Yelchin's photography has since been critically acclaimed by various magazines around the world as exhibits continue.

Yelchin briefly dated his co-star Kristen Stewart when they were filming Fierce People; after his death, she described him as her "first heartbreak".

== Death ==
After Yelchin failed to arrive at a rehearsal on June 18, 2016, he was found by friends at around 1:10 a.m. on June 19, 2016, pinned between his Jeep Grand Cherokee and a brick pillar gate post outside his house in Studio City, Los Angeles, dead from an accident. As Yelchin got out of his car and went to check his locked gate for mail, the vehicle apparently rolled back down his driveway, which was on a steep incline, and trapped him against the pillar and a security fence. Yelchin was pronounced dead at age 27 at the scene; the Los Angeles County Coroner's office identified the cause of death as "blunt traumatic asphyxia" and stated that there were "no obvious suspicious circumstances involved".

=== Tributes ===
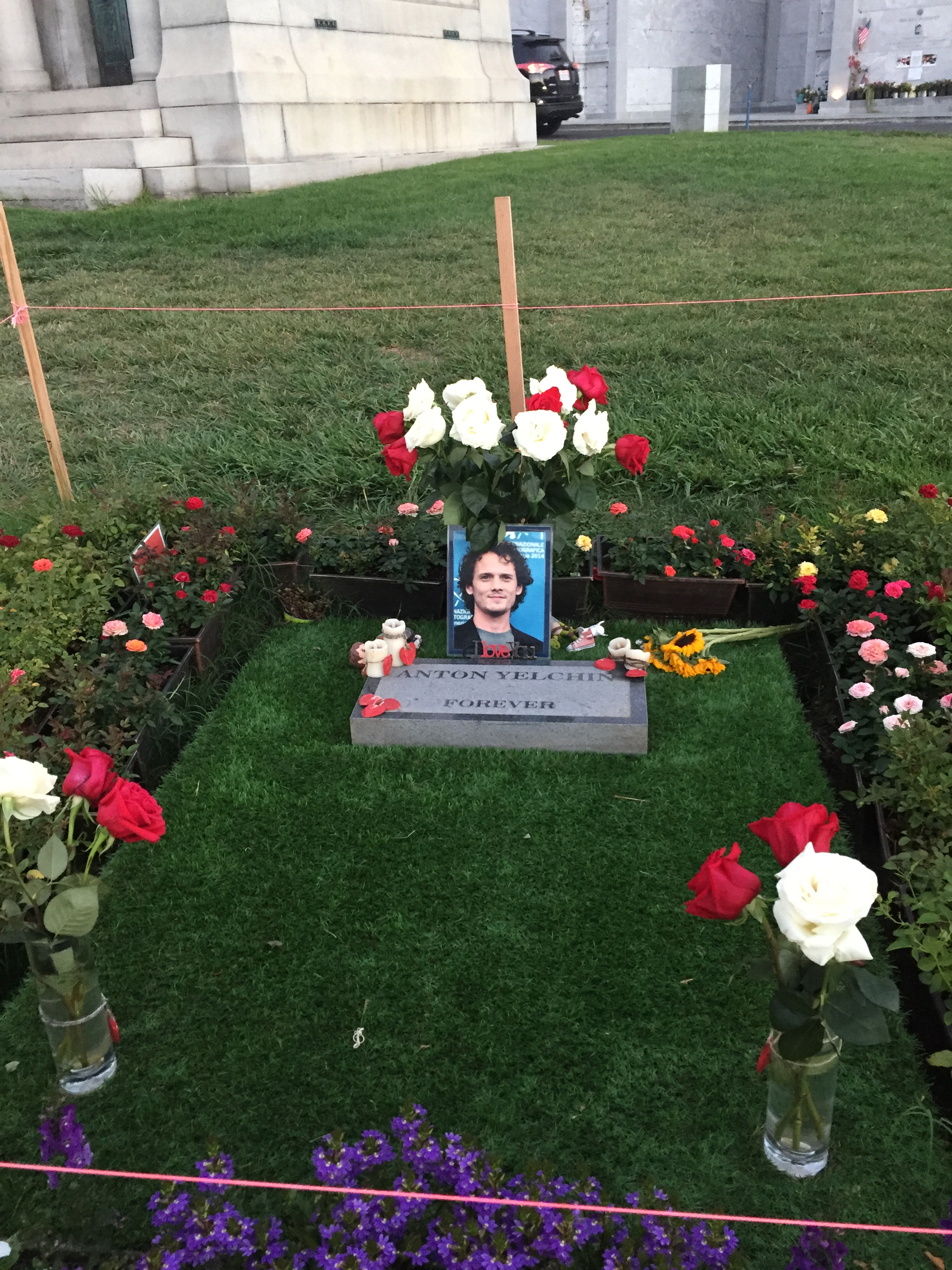
Yelchin's temporary gravestone at the Hollywood Forever Cemetery was later replaced with a bronze statue of his likeness.

Following Yelchin's death, the producers of Star Trek stated that the role of Chekov would not be recast and that the character would be written out of any subsequent Star Trek films. Star Trek Beyond was dedicated to Yelchin and Leonard Nimoy, who also died between the release of Star Trek Into Darkness and Star Trek Beyond. Smurfs: The Lost Village was dedicated to Yelchin, as he had provided the voice of Clumsy Smurf in the live-action Smurfs films. Additionally, We Don't Belong Here, Rememory, Porto, Newness, Thoroughbreds, and the first two episodes of Trollhunters are dedicated to him, with the entirety of Trollhunters being dedicated to him upon its conclusion in May 2018. Yelchin was also featured in the "In Memoriam" section during the 89th Academy Awards. Following the announcement and aftermath of his death, numerous actors/actresses and other celebrities also paid tribute to Yelchin, posting their condolences via social media.

In October 2017, a bronze statue of Yelchin was erected at his grave in the Hollywood Forever Cemetery. Celebrities present at the unveiling ceremony included Jennifer Lawrence, Zoe Saldana, Simon Pegg, J. J. Abrams, Emile Hirsch, Demi Moore, Jon Voight, Drake Doremus, and Jeremy Saulnier. Saldana spoke at the ceremony, paying tribute to Yelchin: "It is a bittersweet moment, because we're here for Anton, and he's not here with us. But, it alleviates my heart knowing that we'll keep him alive. We're going to keep remembering him in the hope that by practicing all the things he believed in and remembering all the love that he gave us, and all the joy he gave us, we're able to just keep him here with us."

Yelchin was memorialized in the online video game Star Trek Online. He received a memorial plaque alongside several other late Star Trek actors, including Nimoy, James Doohan, and Star Trek creator Gene Roddenberry. A Starfleet vessel named "Yelchin" is mentioned twice in Star Trek: Discovery episode "Unification III" (S03E07) and again in the season four finale "Coming Home" (S04E13).

On January 28, 2019, Viktor and Irina Yelchin premiered a documentary about their son—Love, Antosha—at the 2019 Sundance Film Festival.

In the final episode of Star Trek: Picard, a transmission can be heard from an Anton Chekov. Canonically, Anton Chekov is the son of Pavel Chekov, and was voiced by Walter Koenig, the first actor who played Pavel Chekov in Star Trek: The Original Series.

=== Lawsuit and recalls ===
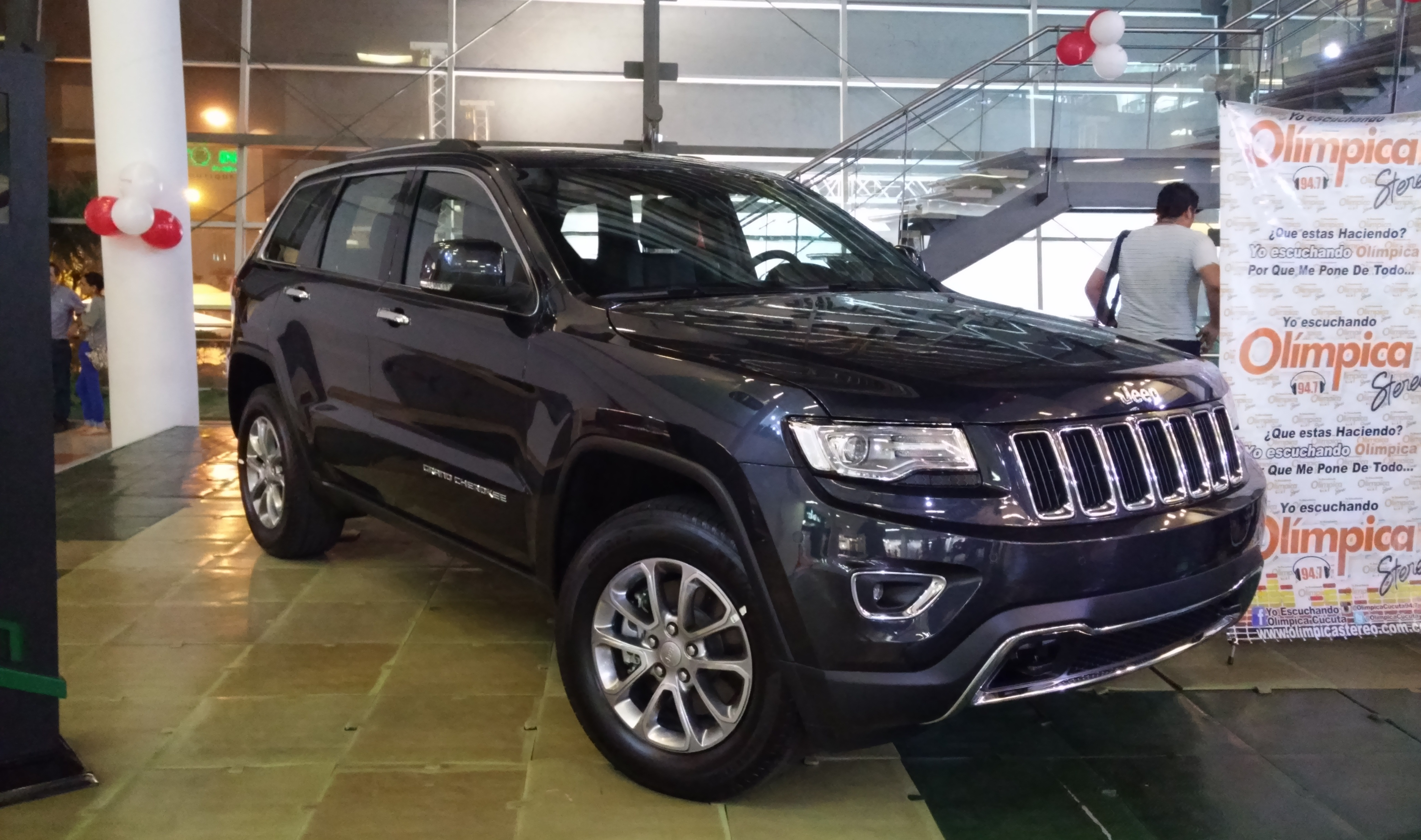
A Jeep Grand Cherokee like the one Yelchin owned

Fiat Chrysler Automobiles (FCA), the manufacturer of the Grand Cherokee, was aware of 2014 and 2015 models having a high rate of rollaway incidents due to a gearshift design that could make it difficult for the driver to determine whether the vehicle was in park or still in gear. FCA had already recalled all 2014–15 Grand Cherokees for this concern in April 2016, but the software patch to repair the vehicles did not reach dealers until the week of Yelchin's death. Following his death, FCA accelerated the recall campaign and took steps to get the affected Jeeps repaired more quickly than originally planned.

On August 1, 2016, Yelchin's parents announced through their attorney that they were planning to file a wrongful death lawsuit against Fiat Chrysler. The dealership from which Yelchin purchased the vehicle stated that he was responsible for his own death, because he had allegedly "misused" and "modified" the vehicle. The dealer also asked to be removed from the lawsuit. On March 22, 2018, it was announced that Yelchin's family and Fiat Chrysler had confidentially settled out of court.

== Filmography ==
=== Film ===
Year	Title	Role	Director	Notes
2000	A Man Is Mostly Water	Augie	Fred Parnes	
2001	Delivering Milo	Milo	Nick Castle	
2001	15 Minutes	Boy in Burning Building	John Herzfeld	
2001	Along Came a Spider	Dimitri Starodubov	Lee Tamahori	
2001	Hearts in Atlantis	Bobby Garfield	Scott Hicks	
2002	A Time for Dancing	Jackson	Peter Gilbert	
2002	Rooftop Kisses	Charlie	Andrew Bernstein	
2004	House of D	Tommy Warshaw	David Duchovny	
2005	Fierce People	Finn Earl	Griffin Dunne	
2006	Alpha Dog	Zack Mazursky	Nick Cassavetes	
2007	Charlie Bartlett	Charlie Bartlett	Jon Poll	
2008	New York, I Love You	Boy in the Park	Brett Ratner	Segment: "Brett Ratner"
2008	Middle of Nowhere	Dorian Spitz	John Stockwell	
2009	Star Trek	Pavel Chekov	J. J. Abrams	
2009	Terminator Salvation	Kyle Reese	McG	Also plays physical embodiment of Skynet (uncredited) in a Kyle Reese disguise
2010	Memoirs of a Teenage Amnesiac	Ace Zuckerman	Hans Canosa	
2011	Like Crazy	Jacob Helm	Drake Doremus	
2011	You and I	Edvard Nikitin	Roland Joffé	
2011	The Beaver	Porter Black	Jodie Foster	
2011	From Up on Poppy Hill	Shun Kazama	Gorō Miyazaki	Voice (English dub)
2011	The Smurfs	Clumsy Smurf	Raja Gosnell	Voice
2011	The Smurfs: A Christmas Carol	Clumsy Smurf	Troy Quane	Short film; voice
2011	Fright Night	Charley Brewster	Craig Gillespie	
2012	The Pirates! Band of Misfits	Albino pirate	Peter Lord	Voice (American dub)
2013	Odd Thomas	Odd Thomas	Stephen Sommers	
2013	Star Trek Into Darkness	Pavel Chekov	J. J. Abrams	
2013	Only Lovers Left Alive	Ian	Jim Jarmusch	
2013	The Smurfs: The Legend of Smurfy Hollow	Clumsy Smurf	Stephan Franck	Short film; voice
2013	The Smurfs 2	Clumsy Smurf	Raja Gosnell	Voice
2013	After the Disco Part One: Angel and the Fool	Oliver	Jacob Gentry	Short film
2013	After the Disco Part Two: Holding On for Life	Oliver	Jacob Gentry	Short film
2014	The Apprentice	Wayne	Steve Baker and Damon Escott	Short film; deleted Movie 43 segment
2014	Rudderless	Quentin	William H. Macy	
2014	5 to 7	Brian Bloom	Victor Levin	
2014	Cymbeline	Cloten	Michael Almereyda	
2014	Burying the Ex	Max	Joe Dante	
2014	Dying of the Light	Milton Schultz	Paul Schrader	
2015	Experimenter	Rensaleer	Michael Almereyda	
2015	Broken Horses	Jacob Heckum	Vidhu Vinod Chopra	
2015	The Driftless Area	Pierre	Zachary Sluser	
2015	Green Room	Pat	Jeremy Saulnier	
2015	Court of Conscience	Father James	James Haven	Short film
2015	Unity	Narrator	Shaun Monson	Documentary
2016	Star Trek Beyond	Pavel Chekov	Justin Lin	Posthumous release; Dedicated to his memory
2016	Porto	Jake Kleeman	Gabe Klinger	Posthumous release; Dedicated to his memory
2017	Thoroughbreds	Tim	Cory Finley	Posthumous release; Dedicated to his memory
2017	Rememory	Todd	Mark Palansky	Posthumous release; Dedicated to his memory
2017	We Don't Belong Here	Maxwell Green	Peer Pedersen	Posthumous release; Dedicated to his memory
2019	Love, Antosha	Himself	Garret Price	Archive footage; documentary about Yelchin's life

=== Television ===
Year	Title	Role	Notes
2000	ER	Robbie Edelstein	Episode: "Be Still My Heart"
2000	Geppetto	Fighting Kid at School	Television film
2002	Judging Amy	Davis Bishop	Episode: "The Justice League of America"
2002	Taken	Jacob Clarke – Child	2 episodes
2002	The Practice	Justin Langer	2 episodes
2003	Without a Trace	Johnny Atkins	Episode: "The Bus"
2004	Curb Your Enthusiasm	Stewart	Episode: "The Blind Date"
2004	NYPD Blue	Evan Grabber	Episode: "Take My Wife, Please"
2004	Jack	Jack	Television film
2004–2006	Huff	Byrd Huffstodt	Main role
2006	Law & Order: Criminal Intent	Keith Tyler	Episode: "Tru Love"
2006	Criminal Minds	Nathan Harris	Episode: "Sex, Birth, Death"
2011	The Life & Times of Tim	Trent	Voice role; episode: "The Caddy's Shack/The Sausage Salesman"
2015–2016	SuperMansion	Dudley	Voice role; 2 episodes
2016–2018	Trollhunters: Tales of Arcadia	Jim Lake Jr	Voice role; 41 episodes; posthumous release dedicated to him

=== Video games ===
Year	Title	Voice role
2013	Star Trek	Pavel Chekov
2013	The Smurfs 2	Clumsy Smurf

=== Music videos ===
Year	Title	Artist(s)	Role	Ref.
2013	"Holding On for Life"	Broken Bells	Oliver	

== Accolades ==
Year	Award	Category	Title of work	Result	Ref.
2002	Phoenix Film Critics Award	Best Youth Performance	Hearts in Atlantis	Nominated	
2002	Young Artist Award	Best Performance in a Feature Film – Leading Young Actor	Hearts in Atlantis	Won	
2003	Young Artist Award	Best Performance in a TV Movie, Mini-Series or Special – Supporting Young Actor	Taken	Nominated	
2005	Young Artist Award	Best Performance in a TV Movie, Miniseries or Special – Leading Young Actor	Jack	Nominated	
2009	Boston Society of Film Critics Awards	Best Ensemble Cast	Star Trek	Won	
2009	Washington DC Area Film Critics Association Awards	Best Ensemble	Star Trek	Nominated	
2010	Broadcast Film Critics Association Awards	Best Acting Ensemble	Star Trek	Nominated	

== See also ==
- Davey Moore – American boxer who died in very similar circumstances
