= Love, Antosha =

2019 film by Garret Price

- Theatrical release poster
- Directed by: Garret Price
- Produced by: Adam Gibbs; Drake Doremus
- Starring: Anton Yelchin (archival footage); Jodie Foster; Jennifer Lawrence; Chris Pine; Kristen Stewart
- Narrated by: Nicolas Cage
- Cinematography: Radan Popovic
- Edited by: Garret Price
- Music by: Saul Simon MacWilliams
- Production company: Lurker Productions
- Distributed by: Lurker Productions
- Release dates: January 28, 2019 (Sundance); August 2, 2019
- Running time: 92 minutes
- Country: United States
- Languages: English; Russian
- Box office: $50,168

Love, Antosha is a 2019 American independent documentary film directed and produced by Garret Price, focusing on the life and career of actor Anton Yelchin. The film premiered in the Doc Premieres category at the 2019 Sundance Film Festival on January 28, 2019. The film was produced and released by Lurker Productions in New York and Los Angeles in August 2019.

== Premise ==
The film reveals Yelchin's struggle with cystic fibrosis, which his parents told him about when he was 17 and he hid from close friends, colleagues, and the public. The film further shows Yelchin's passion for his artistic pursuits and close relationship with his parents. Nicolas Cage stars as the narrator of the film, reading Yelchin's various writings.

== Interviews ==
- J. J. Abrams
- Sofia Boutella
- John Cho
- Marlon Clark
- Ian Cripps
- Ryan Dean
- Willem Dafoe
- Joe Dante
- Paul David
- Drake Doremus
- Ben Foster
- Jodie Foster
- Craig Gillespie
- Dave Glowacki
- Bryce Dallas Howard
- Nick Jones
- Avy Kaufman
- Martin Landau †
- Frank Langella
- Jennifer Lawrence
- Mary Lester
- Mark Palansky
- Simon Pegg
- Chris Pine
- Jon Poll
- Zachary Quinto
- Purush Rao
- Zoe Saldaña
- Luke Shaft
- Sophie Simpson
- Kristen Stewart
- Anya Taylor-Joy
- Gena Tuso
- Jon Voight
- Richard Wicklund

† = Person interviewed died prior to the documentary's release.

== Production ==
Jon Voight, Yelchin's co-star from the 2015 short film Court of Conscience, initially suggested to Yelchin's parents to create a documentary. They first reached out to Drake Doremus, who had directed Yelchin in Like Crazy, but Doremus felt he was too close to Yelchin to direct a film and suggested Garret Price.

== Reception ==
Review aggregator Rotten Tomatoes reports an approval rating of 97% based on 61 reviews, with an average rating of 7.9/10. The site's consensus reads: "Using raw materials left behind by its subject, Love, Antosha takes a thoughtful -- and powerful -- look at a life and career cut short." Metacritic reports an aggregated score of 78 based on 14 reviews, indicating "generally favorable" reviews.

Andrew Barker of Variety wrote that the film was "a touching and surprising portrait of an actor who had much more going on in his life — from a serious illness to some seriously left-field artistic inclinations — than was mentioned in his obituaries.”

Pat Padua of The Washington Post gave Love, Antosha three out of five stars, saying that "at once charming and bittersweet. But the film loses focus a little as it heaps accolades on the late actor". Glenn Kenny of The New York Times said that "[Love, Antosha is] affectionate, heartbreaking documentary about [actor's] life, directed by Garret Price, presents Yelchin as a soldier of cinema, and a lot more".

Stephen Farber of The Hollywood Reporter said that Love, Antosha is "a rich reminiscence of a gifted actor who died far too young". Kenneth Turan of the Los Angeles Times said in his opening comments "You feel the love in 'Love, Antosha' that’s for sure. But you also feel something else, a sadness that is close to overwhelming".
