= Tarzana, Los Angeles =

Neighborhood of Los Angeles, California

Tarzana, Los Angeles "The Zana"
- Neighborhood of Los Angeles
- Tarzana
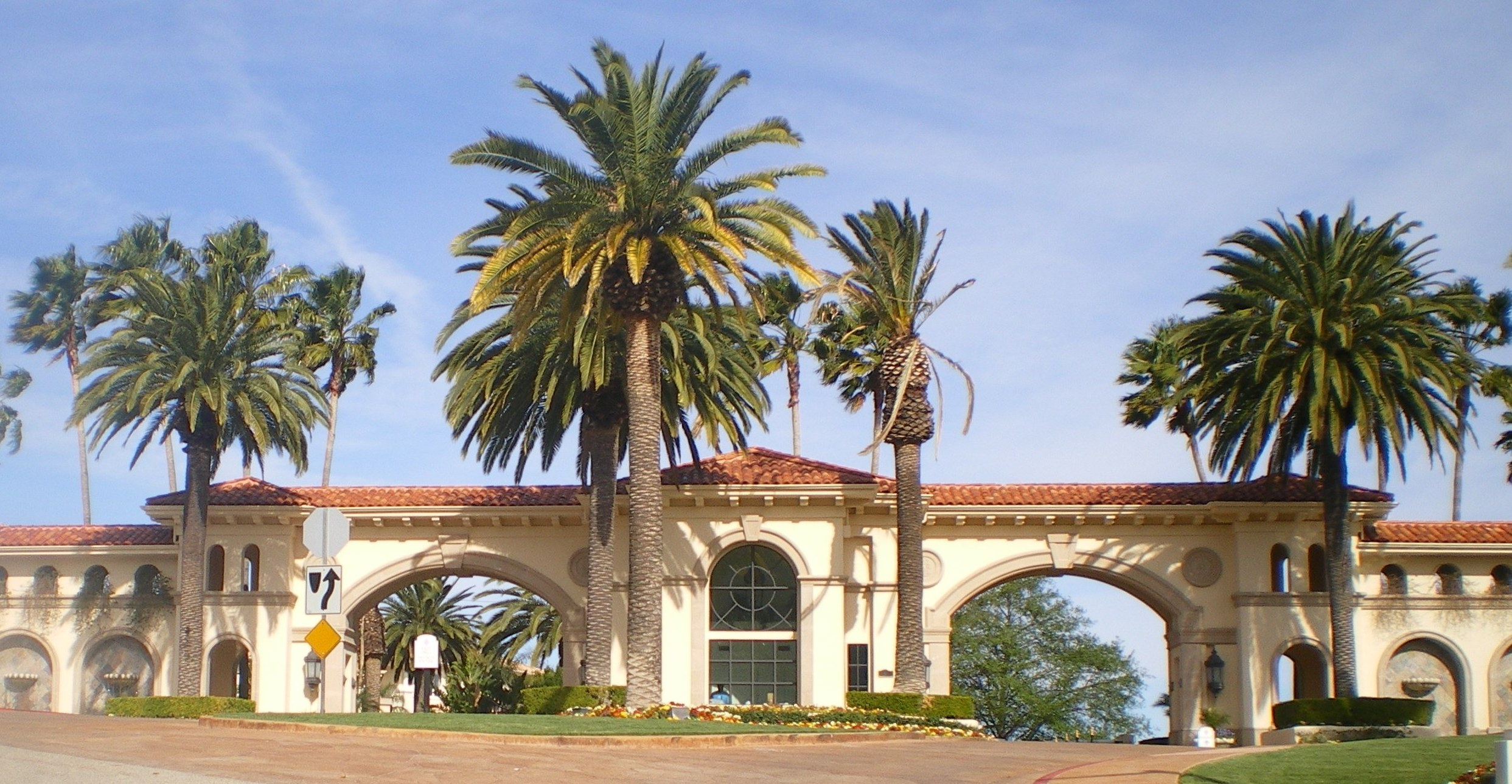
- Mulholland Park Gate in Tarzana in 2007

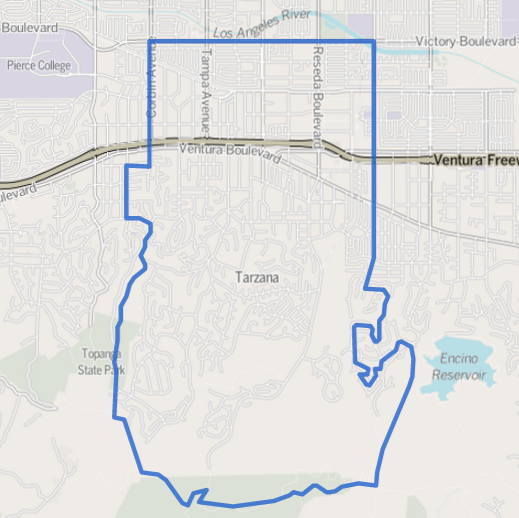
- Location of Tarzana (highlighted in blue) in Los Angeles

- Location of Tarzana in Los Angeles and the San Fernando Valley Tarzana, Los Angeles (the Los Angeles metropolitan area) Tarzana, Los Angeles (California)
- Coordinates: 34.17333°N 118.55306°W
- Country: United States
- State: California
- County: Los Angeles
- City: Los Angeles
- Named for: Tarzan
- Time zone: UTC-8 (PST)
  - Summer (DST): UTC-7 (PDT)
- ZIP Code: 91356, 91357, 91335
- Area codes: 747 and 818
- Website: tarzananc.org

Tarzana (/tɑːrˈzænə/) is a neighborhood in the San Fernando Valley region of Los Angeles, California. Tarzana is on the site of a former ranch owned by author Edgar Rice Burroughs. It is named after Burroughs' fictional jungle hero, Tarzan.

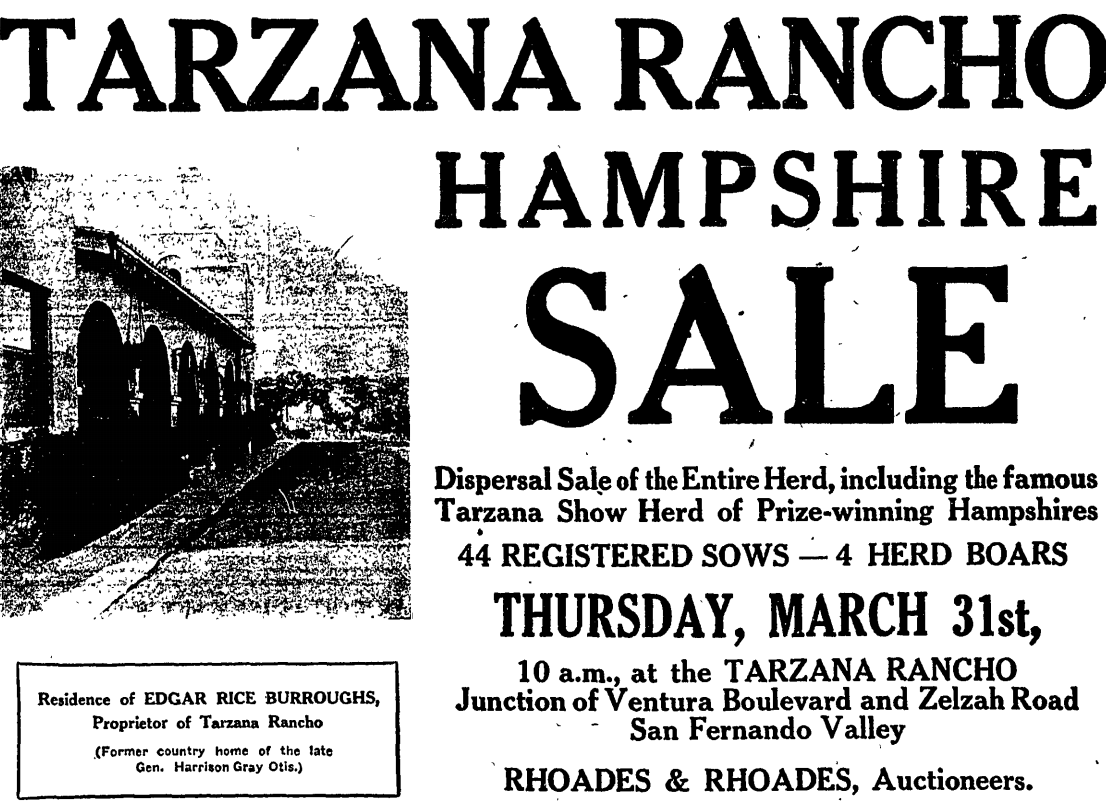
Newspaper advertisement for sale of hogs, 1921

== History ==
The area now known as Tarzana was occupied in 1797 by settlers and missionaries from New Spain who established the San Fernando Mission. The region was later absorbed by Mexico, and then was surrendered to the United States in 1848 in the Treaty of Guadalupe Hidalgo following the Mexican–American War. As part of the U.S., it evolved into a series of large cattle ranches. Investors in the region turned grazing fields into large-scale wheat farms during the 1870s.

The area was purchased in 1909 by the Los Angeles Suburban Homes Company. Los Angeles Times founder and publisher General Harrison Gray Otis invested in the company and also personally acquired 550 acres (2.2 km^{2}) in the center of modern-day Tarzana.

In February 1919, Edgar Rice Burroughs, author of the popular Tarzan novels, relocated to California from Oak Park, Illinois. He and his family had wintered in Southern California twice before, and he found the climate ideal. On March 1, 1919, Burroughs purchased Otis's tract and established Tarzana Ranch. Burroughs subdivided and sold the land for residential development, some parcels of which were utilized as small farms.

== Geography ==
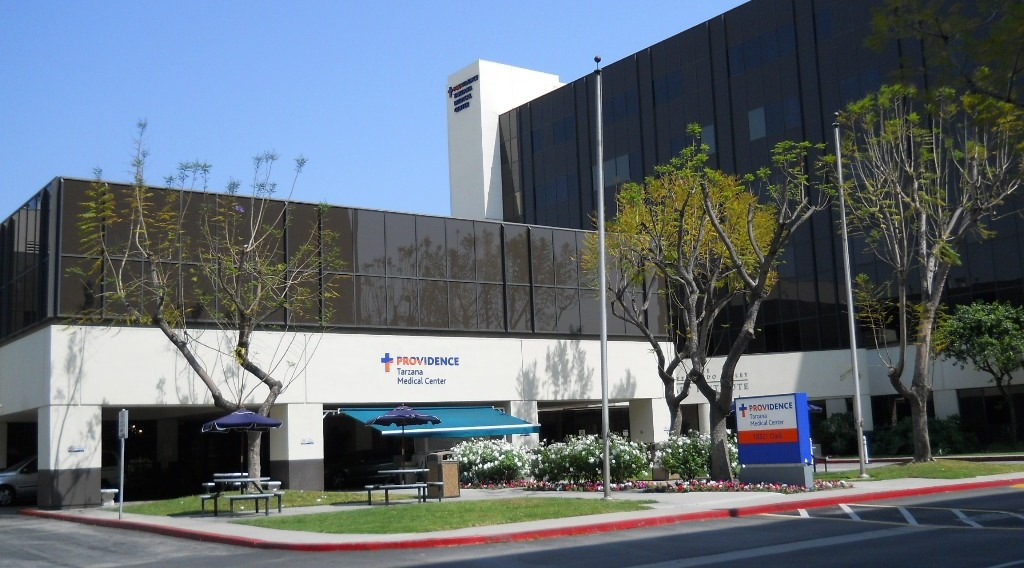
Providence Tarzana Medical Center

=== Boundaries ===
Tarzana, which measures 8.79 square miles (22.8 km^{2}), is bounded on the south by Topanga State Park, on the east by Encino, on the north by Reseda and on the west by Woodland Hills.

Victory Boulevard marks the northern edge of the neighborhood; Lindley Avenue, the eastern; Corbin Avenue, with a jog to Oakdale Avenue, the western; and Topanga State Park, the southern.

=== Climate ===
Tarzana experiences a hot-summer Mediterranean climate. Due to its inland location, there is a higher degree of diurnal temperature variation than more coastal areas of Los Angeles.

Climate data for Tarzana, Los Angeles
Month	Jan	Feb	Mar	Apr	May	Jun	Jul	Aug	Sep	Oct	Nov	Dec	Year
Mean daily maximum °F (°C)	69 (21)	71 (22)	73 (23)	79 (26)	82 (28)	89 (32)	95 (35)	97 (36)	92 (33)	85 (29)	76 (24)	71 (22)	82 (28)
Mean daily minimum °F (°C)	45 (7)	47 (8)	48 (9)	50 (10)	54 (12)	58 (14)	62 (17)	64 (18)	61 (16)	55 (13)	50 (10)	45 (7)	53 (12)
Average precipitation inches (mm)	5.02 (128)	5.26 (134)	4.62 (117)	1.86 (47)	0.90 (23)	0.07 (1.8)	0.01 (0.25)	0.16 (4.1)	0.24 (6.1)	1.59 (40)	2.40 (61)	3.23 (82)	25.36 (644.25)

== Demographics ==
The U.S. Census counted 35,502 people living in Tarzana in 2000, and Los Angeles estimated the neighborhood's population at 37,778 in 2008. There were 4,038 people per square mile, among the lowest population densities in the city. As of November 2025 the current population is 38,184.

According to the 2000 Census, the racial composition was predominantly white (70.7%), followed by Asian (5%), and black or African American (3.6%). The Los Angeles Times considered the area as "moderately diverse". 35.1% of the population was foreign-born, with Iranian (10.3%) and Russian (9.1%) as the most common ancestries. Iran (24.2%) and Mexico (12.1%) were the most common foreign places of birth.

The percentage of divorced men and women was among the county's highest. Some 9% of the residents were military veterans. The percentages of residents aged 50 and older were among the county's highest. The median age is 38. The median household income in 2008 dollars was considered high, at $73,195.

== Notable people ==
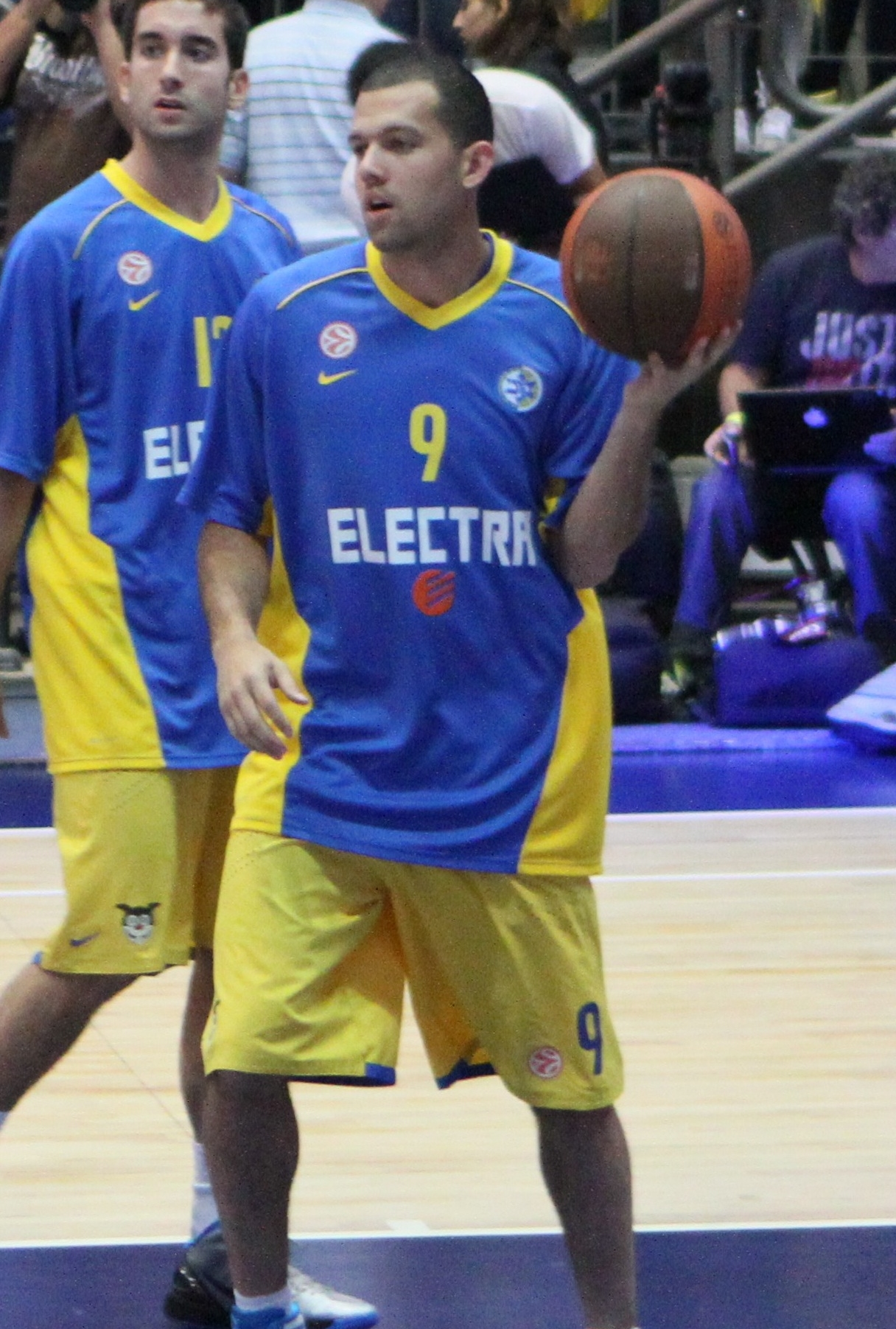
Jordan Farmar

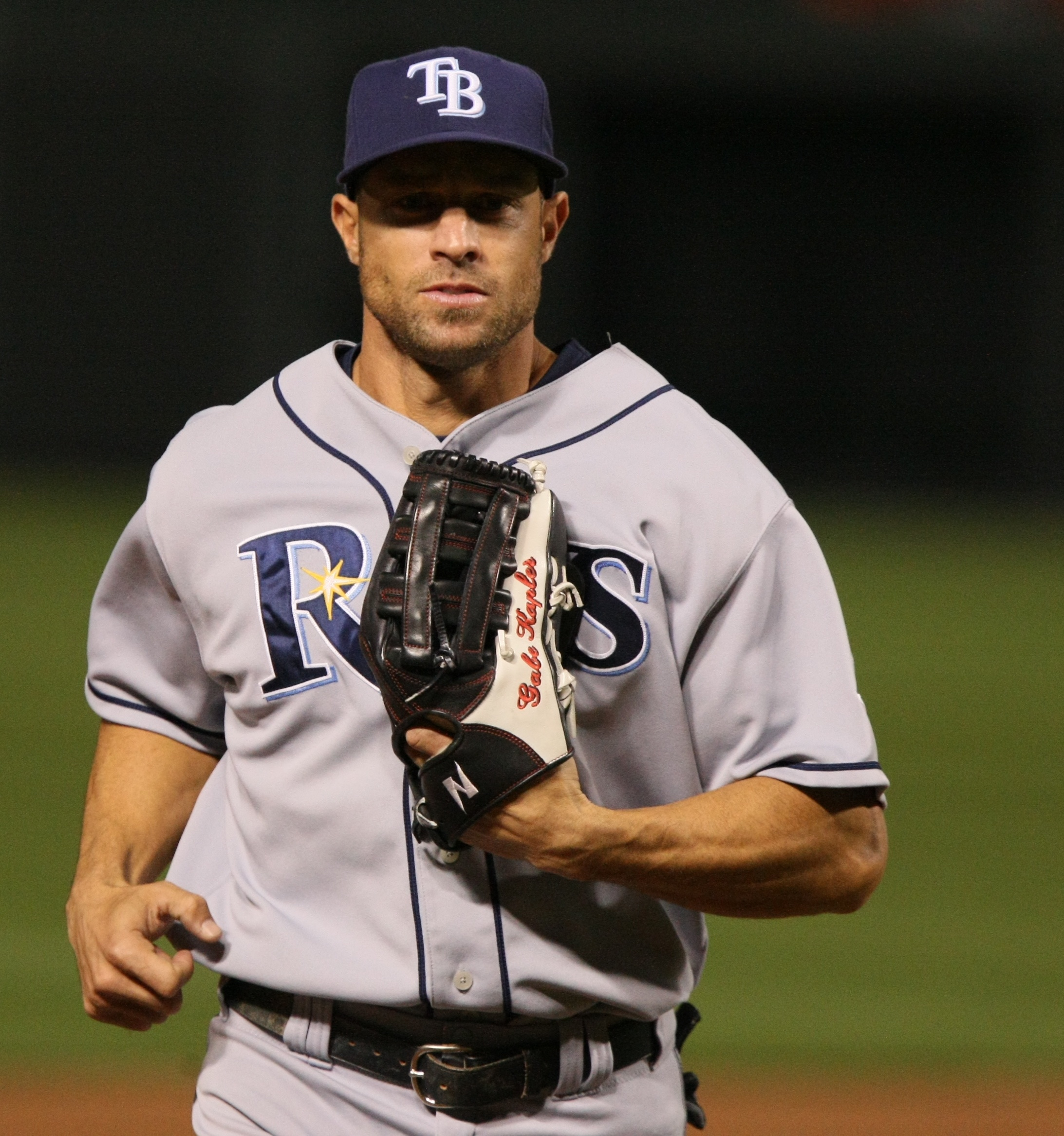
Gabe Kapler

- Paul Abrahamian, reality television participant
- Paul Thomas Anderson, filmmaker
- Marc Anthony, singer
- Ed Asner (1929–2021), actor
- Banks, singer
- Judy Blumberg (born 1957), competitive ice dancer
- Edgar Rice Burroughs, author and founder of the neighborhood
- Mike Borzello (born 1970), MLB coach, including for 5 World Series champion teams
- Cindy Bortz, 1987 World Junior Champion figure skater
- Chris Brown (born 1989), singer
- Doja Cat, rapper, singer, songwriter, and record producer
- Shavahn Church, American-British gymnast
- Jordan Cohen (born 1997), American-Israeli basketball player in the Israeli Basketball Premier League
- Mike Connors, actor
- Bob Crane, actor and radio host
- Kaley Cuoco, actress and producer
- Jason Derulo, singer
- Jordan Farmar (born 1986), American-Israeli NBA basketball player
- Amanda Fink, tennis player
- Selena Gomez, actress, singer
- David Gregory, television journalist
- James Handy, actor
- Robert Hoyt, sound engineer
- Chubby Johnson, actor; served as honorary mayor of Tarzana
- Gabe Kapler (born 1975), Major League Baseball outfielder, and manager (San Francisco Giants)
- Khloé Kardashian, television personality
- Luke Kennard (born 1996), NBA player with the Los Angeles Clippers, lives in Tarzana
- Lisa Kudrow, actress, grew up in Tarzana
- Blake Lively, actress, born in Tarzana
- Jon Lovitz, comedian and actor, born in Tarzana
- Ron Masak, actor, was honorary sheriff of the Tarzana neighborhood for 35 years
- Heather McDonald, comedian
- David Oyelowo, actor, lives in Tarzana
- Rosanna Pansino, YouTube personality
- Lyndsey Parker, entertainment journalist
- Paul Rodriguez, skateboarder, born in Tarzana
- Jim Rome, radio personality, born in Tarzana
- Benji Samit, screenwriter and producer
- Eric Schwartz, comedian, musician, and actor
- JoJo Siwa, YouTube personality and reality television star
- Hailee Steinfeld (born 1996), actress and singer
- Brody Stevens, comedian
- Benny Urquidez, kickboxer, martial arts choreographer, and actor
- Wilmer Valderrama, actor
- David Was, composer, musician, journalist
- Bobby Womack, soul singer-songwriter
- Anton Yelchin (1989–2016), actor

== Education ==
A total of 40.3% of Tarzana residents aged 25 and older have earned a four-year degree. Percentages of those residents with a bachelor's degree or with a master's degree are also high for the county.

=== Elementary and secondary schools ===
Schools within Tarzana are:

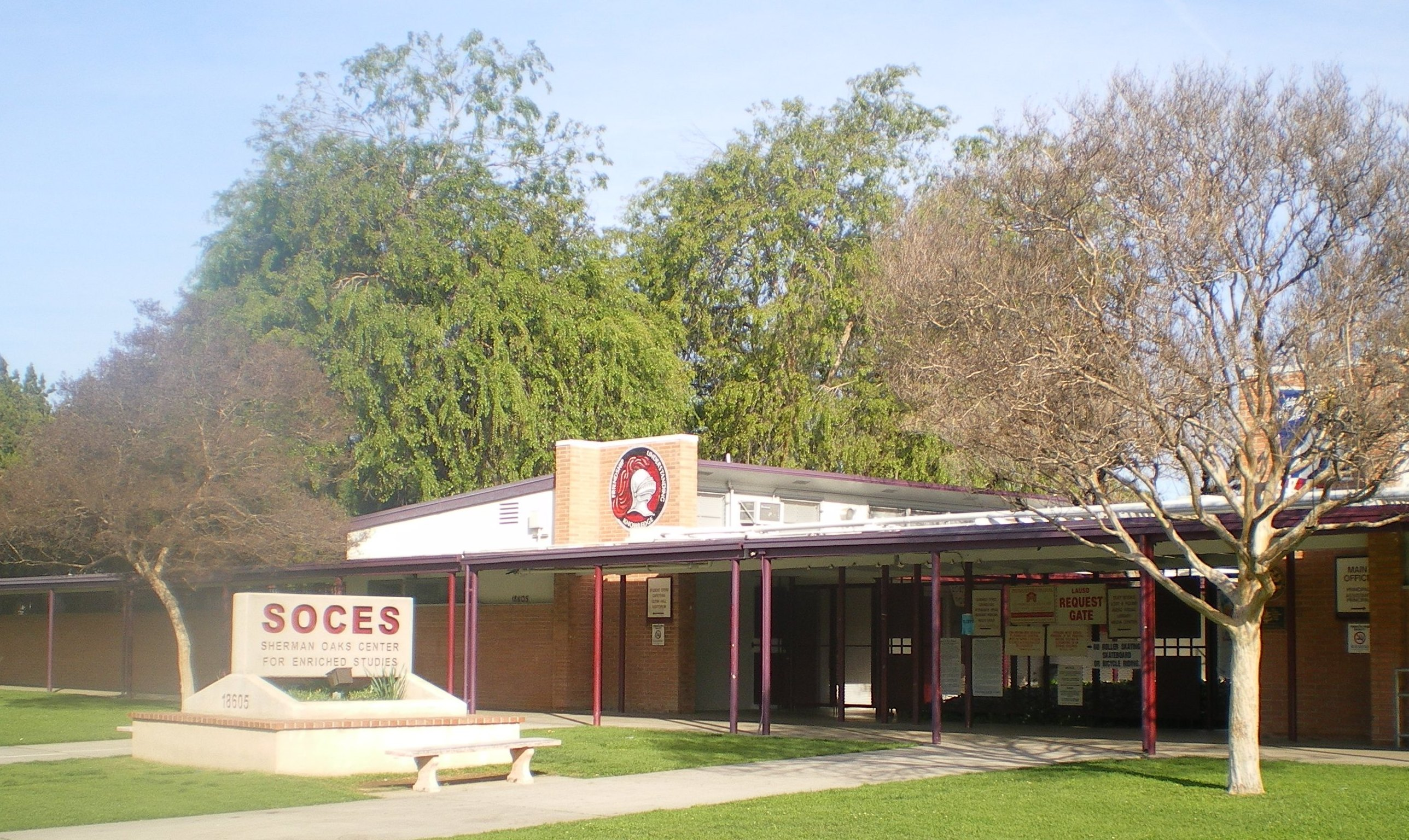
Sherman Oaks Center for Enriched Studies

- Gaspar de Portola Middle School, LAUSD, 18720 Linnet Street
- Sherman Oaks Center for Enriched Studies (4–12), LAUSD alternative, 18605 Erwin Street
- Vanalden Avenue Elementary School, LAUSD, 19019 Delano Street
- Tarzana Elementary School, LAUSD, 5726 Topeka Drive
- CHIME Institute's Schwarzenegger Community School, LAUSD charter, 19722 Collier Street
- Wilbur Charter for Enriched Academics, LAUSD K–5, 5213 Crebs Avenue
- Nestle Avenue Elementary School, LAUSD, 5060 Nestle Avenue

Zoned high schools serving Tarzana include:

- Birmingham High School in (Lake Balboa area)
- Reseda High School (in Reseda area)
- Taft High School (in Woodland Hills area)

Private schools include:

- Lycée International de Los Angeles West Valley Campus

=== Postsecondary schools ===
- Columbia College Hollywood, a private nonprofit film school on Oxnard Street.
- Hypnosis Motivation Institute, a private, non-profit college of hypnotherapy on Ventura Boulevard.

=== Public libraries ===
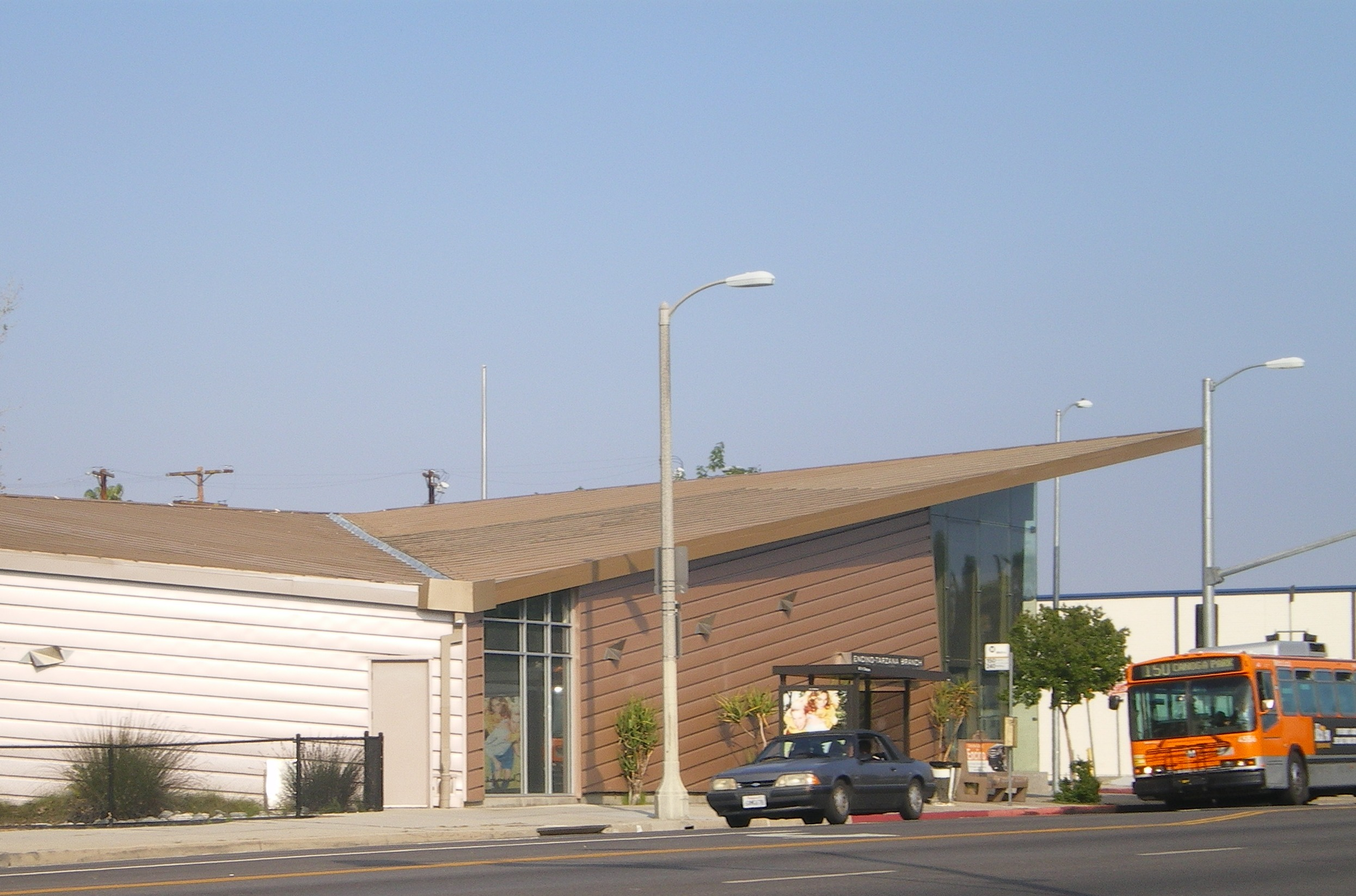
Encino-Tarzana Branch of the Los Angeles Public Library, 2008

The Los Angeles Public Library operates the Encino-Tarzana Branch on Ventura Boulevard in Tarzana.

== Recreation and parks ==
The Tarzana Recreation Center has a gymnasium that also is used as an auditorium; the building's capacity is 600. The park also has barbecue pits, a lighted baseball diamond, lighted outdoor basketball courts, a children's play area, a community room, an indoor gymnasium without weights, picnic tables, and lighted volleyball courts.

Caballero Canyon, located on the north side of the Santa Monica mountains in Tarzana offers multiple trails for hiking, mountain biking and unobstructed views of the San Fernando Valley. There is a 3.6-mile (5.8 km) loop trail located here that is moderately trafficked and allows dogs on a leash. At the top of the trail hikers and mountain bikers will see signs leading the entrance of Topanga State Park. There are no fees or permits required to hike Caballero Canyon.
