= Rememory =

2017 film by Mark Palansky

- Theatrical release poster
- Directed by: Mark Palansky
- Written by: Mark Palansky; Michael Vukadinovich
- Produced by: Daniel Bekerman; Lee Clay
- Starring: Peter Dinklage; Julia Ormond; Anton Yelchin; Henry Ian Cusick; Gracyn Shinyei; Colin Lawrence
- Cinematography: Gregory Middleton
- Edited by: Jane MacRae; Tyler Nelson
- Music by: Gregory Tripi
- Production companies: Great Point Media; First Point Entertainment; Scythia Films
- Distributed by: Lionsgate Premiere
- Release dates: January 25, 2017 (Sundance); August 24, 2017 (Google Play); September 8, 2017 (United States)
- Running time: 111 minutes
- Countries: United Kingdom; United States; Canada
- Language: English
- Box office: $70,212

Rememory is a 2017 British-American-Canadian science fiction mystery film directed by Mark Palansky and written by Mark Palansky and Michael Vukadinovich. The film stars Peter Dinklage, Julia Ormond, Anton Yelchin, Henry Ian Cusick, Gracyn Shinyei and Colin Lawrence. The film premiered at the 2017 Sundance Film Festival on January 25, 2017. The film was released on Google Play on August 24, 2017, before being released in theaters and video on demand on September 8, 2017, by Lionsgate Premiere. The film received generally negative reviews from critics.

== Plot ==
Sam Bloom (Peter Dinklage) and his brother Dash (Matt Ellis) are driving in the night when their car collides with another, causing his brother’s death.

After a year, scientific pioneer Gordon Dunn (Martin Donovan) mysteriously dies. He has created a device that allows one to record memories and watch them. Bloom sets about trying to solve the murder using this memory machine, while also hoping to recover the memory of his brother's death to understand his final words. Bloom learns that Dunn’s device has a technical fault which causes recurring hallucinations for its users including him. Most of the users have been quite upset with Dunn, directly blaming him for their mental deterioration. He also finds out that Dunn and his wife Carolyn (Julia Ormond) were separated after they lost their only daughter in an accident. After a confrontation with one of his patients, Dunn realized how much pain his machine caused people and attempted to use it to erase his own painful memories. However, doing so resulted in his death when the machine sent him into synaptic failure.

Bloom re-watches his “accident memory” and realizes his brother was just singing song lyrics as he died. The real truth of his memory is realizing that the Dunns were in the other car and that their daughter was killed in the collision. Bloom had fled the scene after seeing the little girl dead, leaving his brother to take the fall. Bloom hands over his memory to Carolyn as a sort of confession apology. Time passes and it is unclear if she watches the memory glass, later she throws it into the sea with Dunn’s recordings as she watches her daughter playing on the water—a hallucination resulting from her own use of the memory device. A montage of the lives of everyone affected by the device is shown over the launch of the repaired memory device while a recording by Dunn plays describing the power of memories for a person.

Sam is last seen at the dock, with a completed model he had created of all of the test subjects, Carolyn, himself, and Dunn and throws it into the water, as a means of allowing himself to let go and move on.

== Cast ==
- Peter Dinklage as Sam Bloom
- Julia Ormond as Carolyn Dunn
- Martin Donovan as Gordon Dunn
- Anton Yelchin as Todd
- Henry Ian Cusick as Robert Lawton
- Evelyne Brochu as Wendy Polk
- Matt Ellis as Dash Bloom
- Colin Lawrence as Mike Buckland
- Chad Krowchuk as Neil Frankel
- Gracyn Shinyei as Jane Dunn
- Scott Hylands as Charles
- Courtney Richter as Cindy
- Kathryn Kirkpatrick as Becca
- Carrie Anne Fleming as Norma Myers
- Andrew Herr as Wendy's Male Lover

== Production ==
On March 27, 2012, Catherine O'Hara and Peter Dinklage joined the cast of the film. On February 10, 2016, Julia Ormond replaced O'Hara in the film. Principal photography began in Gastown, Vancouver on January 25, 2016, and ended on February 22, 2016.

== Release ==
The film premiered at the 2017 Sundance Film Festival on January 25, 2017. The film was released on Google Play on August 24, 2017, before being released in theaters and video on demand on September 8, 2017, by Lionsgate Premiere.

== Reception ==
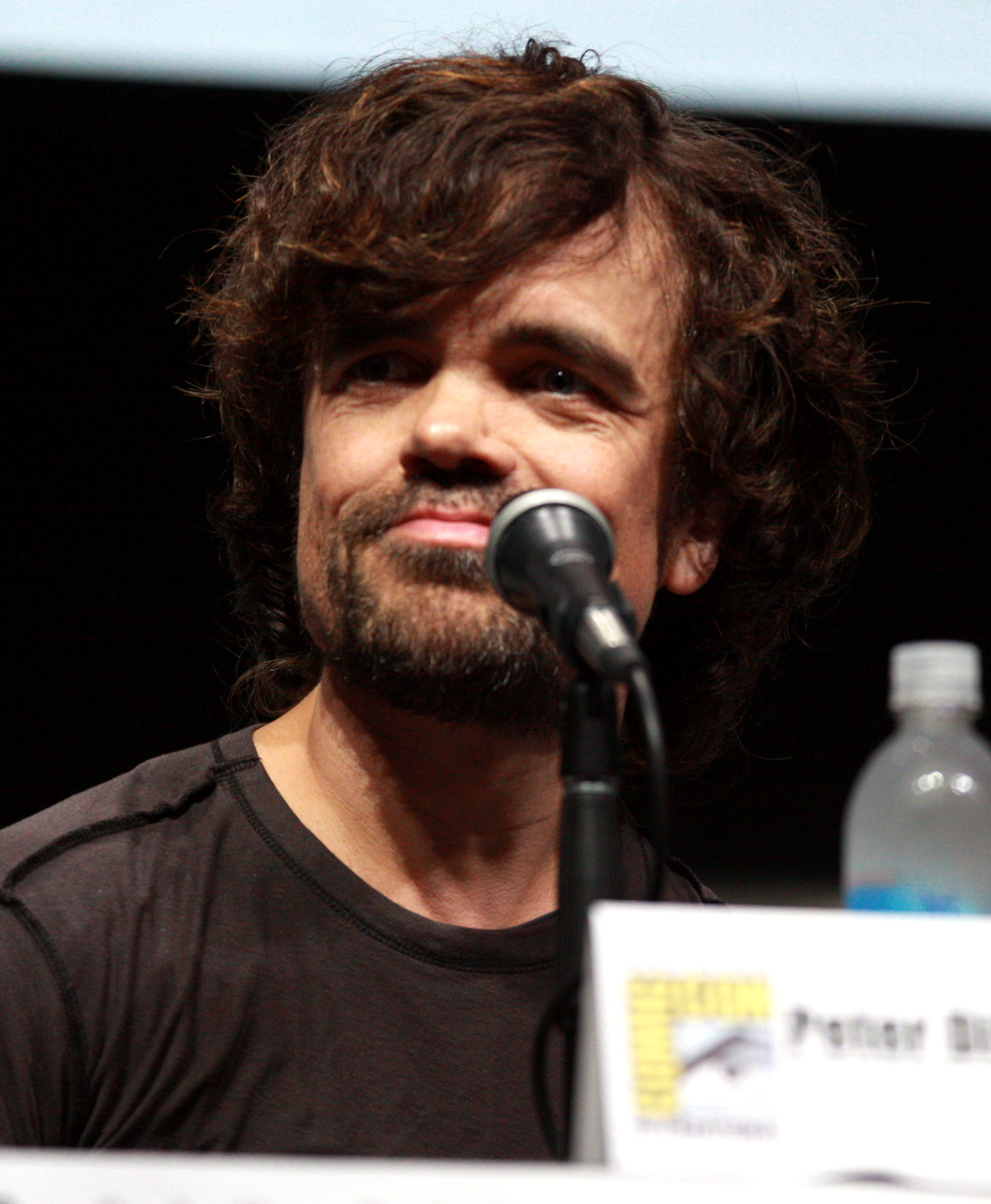
Despite negative reviews for the film itself, Peter Dinklage received praise for his performance as Sam Bloom.

Review aggregator website Rotten Tomatoes gives the film an approval rating of 25%, based on 20 reviews with a consensus reading, "Rememory has some intriguing themes and a compelling cast to work with, but they're lost in the fog of a forgettable melodrama."

Guy Lodge of Variety reviewed the film, saying, "A bit of a trudge, despite Dinklage's committed and empathetic performance." Yasmin Kleinbart of The Young Folks and Scott Beggs of Nerdist both went on to say that "Dinklage deserves better than this film." Meredith Borders of Birth.Movies.Death. shared similar sentiments, saying, "If it weren't for Dinklage's remarkable performance, the film would have very little to recommend it."

John DeFore of The Hollywood Reporter gave a more positive review, saying, "A good-looking mystery whose sci-fi elements take a back seat to meditations on guilt and deception."

== See also ==
- Reversion, a 2015 film also dealing with a human memory device
