= Stories of Lost Souls =

- DVD cover
- Directed by: Mark Palansky; Deborra-Lee Furness; Andrew Upton; Col Spector; Toa Stappard; William Garcia; Illeana Douglas; Paul Holmes
- Produced by: Thomas Bannister
- Starring: Josh Hartnett; Hugh Jackman; Cate Blanchett; Keira Knightley; Paul Bettany; James Gandolfini; Jeff Goldblum; Daryl Hannah; Billy Boyd
- Distributed by: America Video Films
- Release dates: 3 February 2005 (United States); 27 August 2007 (United Kingdom)
- Running time: 90 minutes
- Countries: United States; United Kingdom; Australia
- Language: English

Stories of Lost Souls is an anthology film starring Josh Hartnett, Hugh Jackman, Keira Knightley, Cate Blanchett, James Gandolfini, Paul Bettany, and Illeana Douglas and directed by eight different directors including Deborra-Lee Furness and Mark Palansky.

The film was executive produced by Thomas Bannister and released direct-to-video in the United States on 3 February 2005.

The film was later released in the United Kingdom on 27 August 2007.

== Segments ==
The Same

Directed by Mark Palansky – Starring Josh Hartnett, Jason Acuña and Jacqui Maxwell

A creepy house. Every night a dwarf awaits his beautiful neighbor's return. He will do anything to win the girl of his dreams, including murder; he kills another neighbor and chops off the corpse's legs. Upon leaving the crime scene, the girl sees him and uncovers her own legs, which look like porcelain.

Standing Room Only

Directed by Deborra-Lee Furness – Starring Hugh Jackman, Michael Gambon, Joanna Lumley, and Mary Elizabeth Mastrantonio

The story revolves around a group of people waiting in line for a performance.

Bangers

Directed by Andrew Upton – Starring Cate Blanchett

The haunting tale of a woman descending into madness. Julie-Anne, a moderately successful career woman, is preparing dinner for her gruff and unsympathetic mother. As she cooks mashed potatoes and sausages, she tells an indifferent audience of her mother and cat about a recent promotion at work. As she rants about her job it becomes apparent that she is in the middle of a mental breakdown that culminates in burned sausage and mashed potatoes all over the floor.

New Year's Eve

Directed by Col Spector – Starring Keira Knightley

The story of a seductive temptress at a New Year's Eve party.

Euston Road

Written by Tristram Pye and directed by Toa Stappard – Starring Paul Bettany

A fast car. Two men talking in a hotel bar. Seven questions in eight minutes. And it is 9 pm on Euston Road. Figure it out.

A Whole New Day

Directed by William Garcia – Starring James Gandolfini

The story of an abusive alcoholic who wakes up in an abandoned apartment after a black-out. A man on the floor comes to consciousness in an empty apartment – no furniture, no décor on the walls, no gas in the stove. He has only his cell phone, a jacket, and a hangover. Elsewhere in the city, his wife is in a kitchen, harried by three rambunctious children, angry at her husband. She leaves a message on his cell phone that the marriage is over. He calls his friend Jimmy to tell him to bring over some beer. Then, a young woman he does not know walks into the apartment. What is going on?

Supermarket

Directed by Illeana Douglas – Starring Daryl Hannah, Jeff Goldblum and Illeana Douglas

The story of a woman who works at a supermarket where Daryl Hannah continually slacks off, nearly drooling fans stalk her, and Jeff Goldblum comes in to shop for pastries.

Sniper 470

Directed by Paul Holmes – Starring Billy Boyd

A futuristic story of a lone sniper on a mission in outer space.
