= Sherman Oaks Center for Enriched Studies =

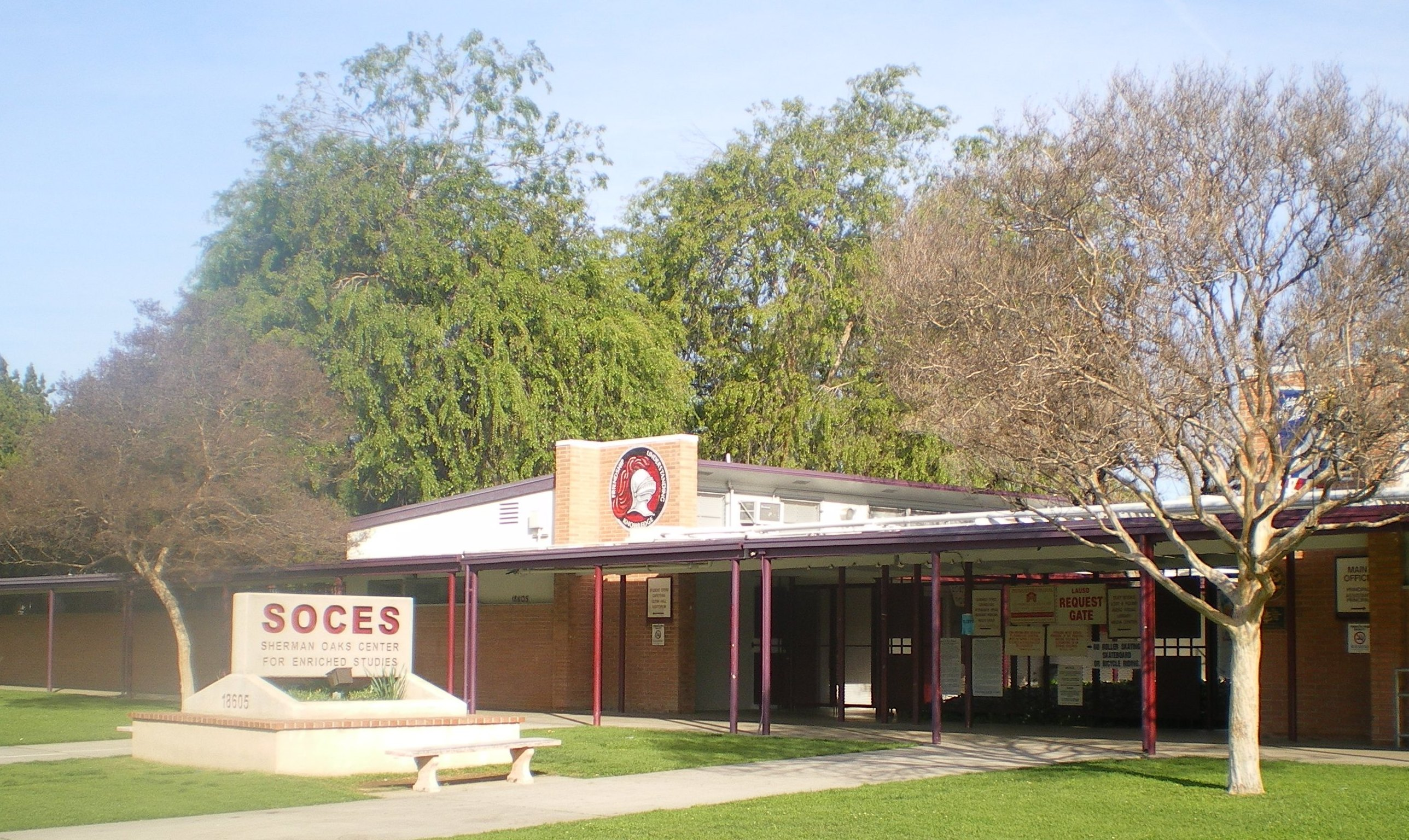

Location
- 18605 Erwin Street; Tarzana, California 91335; United States; 34°11′3″N 118°32′18″W

Information
- Type: Public/ Magnet
- Established: 1953
- School district: Los Angeles Unified School District
- Principal: vacant
- Teaching staff: 66.00 (FTE)
- Grades: 4-12
- Enrollment: 2089
- Student to teacher ratio: 31.36
- Campus: Suburban
- Colors: Burgundy, Gray, Black
- Mascot: Knights
- Nickname: SOCES, CES
- Website: shermanoaksces.lausd.org

Sherman Oaks Center for Enriched Studies is a magnet public school in the San Fernando Valley, Los Angeles, California, United States.

Despite the name, SOCES is located in the Tarzana section of Los Angeles on the former campus of Sequoia Junior High School. (Prior to 1980, the campus was located at the site of present-day Sherman Oaks Elementary School in the Sherman Oaks section of Los Angeles). The school is a part of the Los Angeles Unified School District.

SOCES is a California Distinguished School at which students can stay from 4th through 12th grade. SOCES is listed as a national gold-rated school and is one of the "Best High Schools in America" according to U.S. News & World Report. The school is also listed in the Washington Post's "America's Most Challenging High Schools". The school was named a National Magnet School of Distinction by the Magnet Schools of America in 2008 and 2009. As of July 2007, the school was issued a full six-year term of accreditation by the Western Association of Schools and Colleges' accreditation process. SOCES has a three-year average Academic Performance Index score of 888 as of September 2014.

== Notable alumni ==
- Anton Yelchin - actor
- Cameron Boyce - actor
