= Annie Starke =

American actress (born 1988)

- Born: April 26, 1988 (age 38)
- Education: Hamilton College (BA)
- Occupation: Actress
- Years active: 2001–present
- Spouse: Marc Albu (m. 2018)
- Children: 1
- Mother: Glenn Close
- Relatives: William Close (maternal grandfather)

Annie Starke Albu (born April 26, 1988) is an American actress who has appeared on film and Broadway.

== Early years ==
The daughter of actress Glenn Close and movie producer John Starke, she was raised in Bedford, New York. Starke attended Hamilton College in Clinton, New York, studying the history of art.

== Career ==
Starke appeared in the films Albert Nobbs and We Don’t Belong Here, and also appeared in The Wife as a younger version of Joan Castleman, the character played by her mother Glenn Close. Starke also played a younger version of Close in the Owen Wilson and Ed Helms comedy Father Figures.

== Personal life ==
Starke’s godfather is Robert F. Kennedy Jr. Starke married money manager Marc Albu in Bedford, New York, at her mother's estate on June 30, 2018. Starke is a dog lover and – as of March 2018 – has a Labrador called Big Al. She welcomed her first child, a son, Rory Westaway Albu, on February 7, 2025.

Starke is an equestrian rider. In February 2004, at age 15, she won the Children's Modified Jumper Championship at the 32nd Winter Equestrian Festival in Florida.

== Filmography ==
=== Film ===
Year	Title	Role	Notes
2011	Albert Nobbs	Young chocolate shop waitress	
2016	We Don’t Belong Here	Madeline Green	
2017	The Wife	Young Joan Castleman	
2017	Father Figures	Young Helen Baxter	Uncredited

=== Television ===
Year	Title	Role	Notes
2001	South Pacific	Singing Jerome	Television film
2020	Ratched	Lily Cartwright	Recurring role; 4 episodes
