= We Don't Belong Here (film) =

- Film poster
- Directed by: Peer Pedersen
- Written by: Peer Pedersen
- Produced by: Annelise Dekker; Adam Gibbs; Michael Kristoff; Roger Joseph Pugliese
- Starring: Catherine Keener; Anton Yelchin; Riley Keough; Molly Shannon; Maya Rudolph; Cary Elwes
- Cinematography: Doug Emmett
- Edited by: Jake Pushinsky; Suzanne Spangler
- Music by: Michael Yezerski
- Production company: Bright Space
- Distributed by: Sony Pictures Entertainment
- Release date: April 4, 2017
- Running time: 89 minutes
- Country: United States
- Language: English

We Don't Belong Here, previously titled The Greens Are Gone, is an American drama film written and directed by Peer Pedersen. It stars Catherine Keener, Riley Keough, Maya Rudolph, Molly Shannon, Cary Elwes and Anton Yelchin in his final film role. The film was released on April 4, 2017, by Sony Pictures Entertainment.

== Premise ==
Nancy Green is the mother of a dysfunctional family. She is pushed to her limits, after her son, Maxwell, disappears.

== Cast ==
- Catherine Keener as Nancy Green, Madeline, Elisa, Lily and Maxwell's mother
- Kaitlyn Dever as Lily Green, Nancy's youngest daughter
- Anton Yelchin as Maxwell Green, Nancy's son
- Riley Keough as Elisa Green, Nancy's daughter
- Annie Starke as Madeline Green, Nancy's oldest daughter
- Molly Shannon as Deborah
- Justin Chatwin as Tomas
- Austin Abrams as Davey
- Debra Mooney as Grandmother
- Maya Rudolph as Joanne
- Cary Elwes as Frank Harper
- Michelle Hurd as Tania
- Sarah Ramos as Jill
- Mark Famiglietti as Man at Track

== Production ==
On May 14, 2014, it was announced that Catherine Keener, Kiernan Shipka, Anton Yelchin, Riley Keough, Annie Starke, Cary Elwes and Lois Smith had joined the cast of the film, then titled The Greens Are Gone. Keener would play the mother of a dysfunctional family who is pushed to her limits after the disappearance of her son, played by Yelchin. Shipka would play her bipolar teenage daughter, while Keough and Starke would play the troubled grown daughters. Starke, Glenn Close's daughter, made her acting debut in the film. Peer Pedersen would make his directorial debut on the film based on his own script, produced by Annelise Dekker, Adam Gibbs, Michael Kristoff and Roger Joseph Pugliese. On June 5, 2014, Kaitlyn Dever joined the film, replacing Shipka, to play the bipolar daughter. Later, on June 12, 2014, Elwes's casting was confirmed by Deadline; he would play Frank, a local in the town. On June 13, 2014, Maya Rudolph was confirmed to be in the cast.

=== Filming ===
Principal photography on the film began on July 7, 2014, in Worcester, Massachusetts. The first day of filming took place at the historic Ralph's Chadwick Square Diner, where Kaitlyn's character sings a ‘70s hit song; the scene took up only three-and-a-half pages of the script. On July 8, 2014, filming was taken place in Norwood, where the crew used the Norwood Theatre office as the set for the film and converted it into the bookstore named "Harper Booksellers." Several shots were taken in and out of the store all day, which featured Dever, Elwes, Rudolph and Shannon, and the store was owned by Elwes's character. On July 10, 2014, filming took place in Wellesley, where they used the Elm Bank Reservation as the set for the film. Filming wrapped-up on July 24, 2014.

=== Post-production ===
In April 2015, the film was in post-production, with an originally scheduled premiere of late 2015. Michael Yezerski was set to provide the score for the film.

== Release ==
The film was released through video on demand, DVD and Blu-Ray on April 4, 2017. With its release delayed until long after filming had been completed in July 2014, the producers were able to dedicate the film to Yelchin, who died in June 2016.
