= The Driftless Area =

2015 film by Zachary Sluser

- Teaser poster
- Directed by: Zachary Sluser
- Screenplay by: Tom Drury; Zachary Sluser
- Based on: The Driftless Area by Tom Drury
- Produced by: Aaron L. Gilbert; Keith Kjarval
- Starring: Zooey Deschanel; Anton Yelchin; John Hawkes; Aubrey Plaza; Alia Shawkat
- Cinematography: Daniel Voldheim
- Edited by: Tom Cross
- Music by: Saunder Jurriaans; Daniel Bensi
- Production companies: Unified Pictures; Bron Studios
- Distributed by: Sony Pictures Home Entertainment
- Release date: April 18, 2015 (Tribeca Film Festival)
- Countries: Canada; United States
- Language: English

The Driftless Area is a 2015 Canadian-American neo-noir dramedy film directed by Zachary Sluser and starring Anton Yelchin, Zooey Deschanel, and John Hawkes. Alia Shawkat, Aubrey Plaza, Frank Langella, and Ciarán Hinds also appear in supporting roles. The film is based on the 2006 novel of the same title by Tom Drury, who co-wrote the screenplay with Sluser.

== Plot ==
A college graduate turned bartender, Pierre, returns to his hometown in the Driftless Area after his parents' death. Shane picks up Pierre, who was hitchhiking and carrying a rosebush, after Pierre's car breaks down. Shane charges Pierre $20 for the privilege and kicks him out of his vehicle further down the road, stealing his rosebush. Pierre takes a rock out of his pocket and hurls it at the car, which causes Shane to crash on the next curve. Pierre inspects the scene and finds a $77,000 bag of money in Shane's truck. He plans to give his newfound money to a woman who gave him the rock, and who needs plastic surgery for a badly scarred face. He feels the money is destined for her, since she told him that she could only ever get the needed surgery "if she ever found a pile of money." Meanwhile, Shane wakes up from the crash and steals a car from a woman who stopped to help him.

While walking through a field, Pierre falls into a well and is rescued by Stella. Pierre feels indebted to her for saving his life, and goes on to fall in love with her. Stella is a ghost, inadvertently killed in an arson fire set by Shane on his brother's orders, believing the house empty. Tim Geer is helping Stella deal with her situation and get retribution for a life stolen.

Shane, his brother Ned, and Lyle arrive to get back their money. Eventually they catch up to Pierre, who leads the trio into a trap. Over a disagreement at their predicament, short-tempered Shane shoots Lyle through the heart. Shane and Pierre kill each other in a shootout. As Shane lies dying, Stella appears to him and questions her killing, then comforts Pierre through his last breath. Pierre seemingly knew he was going to die as he wrote a will giving his car to his friend, Carrie, his grey felt hat to Keith, and his binoculars to Stella.

Pierre wakes up on a beach and is greeted by Stella. She explains they are going to have a lot of time together, just as he had wished for before.

== Cast ==
- Anton Yelchin as Pierre Hunter
- Zooey Deschanel as Stella
- John Hawkes as Shane
- Alia Shawkat as Carrie
- Aubrey Plaza as Jean
- Ciarán Hinds as Ned
- Frank Langella as Tim Geer
- Benjamin Rogers as Keith
- Erika Portnoy as Tragic Woman

== Production ==
Production on the film began on May 14, 2014, in Vancouver, British Columbia, Canada. Filming wrapped on June 12, 2014.

=== Music ===
The film's original score was composed by Saunder Jurriaans and Danny Bensi.

== Release ==
The film had its world premiere at the Tribeca Film Festival on April 18, 2015. The film screened as the Opening Night film for the Aruba International Film Festival on October 7, 2015. Shortly afterwards, it was announced that Sony Pictures Worldwide Acquisitions had acquired distribution rights to the film. The film was released on April 26, 2016, on video on demand and home media formats.
