= Paul Holmes (director) =

Paul Holmes is a British freelance television director and lecturer at Napier University in Edinburgh, Scotland.

Holmes wrote and directed a short film Sniper 470, starring actors Billy Boyd and Carmen Pieraccini. Holmes was nominated for a BAFTA for producing the short A Small Deposit, along with director Eleanor Yule. He also produced and directed a short film Going Down.

Holmes previously worked in children's television, directing drama series such as Newcastle-based Byker Grove. He also worked on the children's programme Balamory, and between 2005 and 2006 Holmes directed several episodes of BBC Scotland's Glasgow-based soap River City.

== Filmography ==
Year	Title	Notes
1993	A Small Deposit	BAFTA Nominated
1997	Going Down	TV short
1997	Mr. Wymi	14 Episodes
1998	Hububb	Episode "Tee's for Two"
2004	Byker Grove	4 Episodes
2005	Stories of Lost Souls	Episode "Sniper 470"
