= Peer Pedersen =

American film producer

- Born: Peer Pedersen; New York, New York, United States
- Education: The New School
- Occupation: Filmmaker
- Years active: 2008–present

Peer Pedersen is an American film producer known for producing the films Lucky Them and Live at the Foxes Den, as well the documentary Finders Keepers. Pedersen also directed the independent feature film We Don't Belong Here.

== Early life ==
Pedersen was born in New York City and raised in Rye, New York. He has four younger sisters. His parents are divorced. Pedersen was interested in arts at an early age, acting in school plays like The Emperor's New Clothes in which he played the title character. Pedersen graduated from Brunswick School in 2005, and five years later at the Sundance Film Festival, he met his future producing partners, Adam Gibbs and Michael Kristoff. He attended the University of Southern California School of Cinematic Arts for film studies, and holds a degree in media studies from The New School.

== Career ==
Pedersen began his career as production assistant on two short films, The Only Girl and Father Time (both 2008). Pedersen served as executive producer for Live at the Foxes Den (2013), a drama film with Jackson Rathbone in the lead role of Bobby Kelly, a young lawyer who aspires at a music career. Directed by Michael Kristoff in his directorial debut, the film was released in a limited release and through video on demand on December 6. He then executive produced the indie drama Lucky Them (2013), starring Toni Collette and Thomas Haden Church. The film which centers on a rock journalist (Collette) searching for her famous ex-boyfriend, had its world premiere at the 2013 Toronto International Film Festival, and was released theatrically the following year by IFC Films.

Pedersen co-produced the documentary Finders Keepers (2015) about John Wood, a man who embarks on a legal battle to reclaim his mummified leg. It premiered with rave reviews at the Sundance Film Festival, being acquired for domestic distribution and released in theaters and on digital platforms later that year by The Orchard. Pedersen has also produced the short film Minimum Wage (2015), which screened at the Palm Springs International Festival of Short Films.

Pedersen made his directorial debut with the independent drama We Don't Belong Here (2017), starring Kaityln Dever, Catherine Keener, Anton Yelchin, Riley Keough, Cary Elwes and Justin Chatwin. The film about a dysfunctional family was released through video on demand, DVD and Blu-ray on April 4 by Sony Pictures Home Entertainment. Pedersen dedicated the film to Yelchin, who died in June 2016.

== Filmography ==
=== As producer ===
Year	Title	Notes
2013	Lucky Them	executive producer
2013	Live at the Foxes Den	executive producer
2015	Finders Keepers	co-producer
2015	Minimum Wage	Short film
2017	We Don't Belong Here	also writer and director

=== As production assistant ===
Year	Title	Notes
2008	The Only Girl	Short film
2008	Father Time	Short film
