= A Man Is Mostly Water =

2000 film

- Directed by: Fred Parnes
- Written by: Fred Parnes
- Produced by: Libbie Chase; Fred Parnes
- Starring: Fred Parnes
- Cinematography: D. Alan Newman
- Edited by: Kate Ahmed
- Music by: Skip Heller
- Production company: Dog Park Productions
- Release date: October 12, 2000 (Austin)
- Running time: 110 minutes
- Country: United States
- Language: English

A Man Is Mostly Water is a 2000 American comedy film written by, directed by and starring Fred Parnes. It was Anton Yelchin's film debut.

== Cast ==
- Fred Parnes as Roper
- Christopher Rydell as Andy
- Mark Curry as Jeff
- Paulina Mielech as Lily
- Linda Pine as Amanda
- Heather Roop as Jaime
- Anton Yelchin as Augie
- Richard Edson as Bud Guy
- Mark Rydell as Distributor
- Bill Pullman as Parking Fascist
- Lou Rawls as Mailman
- Peter Barton as Jack
- Phil LaMarr as Testifier
