= Finders Keepers (2015 film) =

- Theatrical release poster
- Directed by: Bryan Carberry; Clay Tweel
- Cinematography: Adam Hobbs
- Edited by: Bryan Carberry; Tchavdar Georgiev; Clay Tweel
- Music by: Osei Essed; Dan Romer
- Release date: January 27, 2015 (Sundance Film Festival)
- Running time: 82 minutes
- Country: United States
- Language: English

Finders Keepers is a 2015 documentary film by Bryan Carberry and Clay Tweel. The story details John Wood's attempts to recover his mummified leg from Shannon Whisnant, after Whisnant found the leg in a grill purchased at a storage unit auction.

== Synopsis ==
In 2004, John Wood and his father, Tom, are involved in a plane crash in Tom's Cessna. Tom is killed and John's leg must be amputated below the knee. John—celebrating a year of sobriety after an addiction to drugs in his youth—blames himself for the crash, even though his brother and nephew assure him that the crash was not his fault. John requests that the hospital return his amputated leg to him, intending to turn it into a shrine to his father as a way of coping with his grief.

John is surprised when, rather than return his leg and foot bones, the hospital gives him his entire amputated leg, including the flesh and muscle. John makes several failed attempts to skin the leg himself before deciding to mummify it. The leg ends up in a barbecue grill in John's storage shed, undergoing a primitive mummification process.

John relapses into drug addiction after he begins drinking beer while taking the painkillers prescribed to him after his surgery. He spends the rent money for his storage shed on drugs, and the shed is put up for auction by its owner.

The shed is purchased by Shannon Whisnant, a local entrepreneur. When he discovers the leg, Whisnant sees it as an opportunity to fulfil his lifelong dream of being a rich and famous television personality. Whisnant begins spreading news of the leg in the local media, calling himself “The Foot Man” and expressing his desire to create a roadside attraction using it. When John learns of this, he makes contact with Whisnant to try and get the leg back. Whisnant agrees only to return ownership of the leg to John on the grounds that John allow him to display the leg, with both men collecting a profit. John initially agrees in an attempt to get Whisnant to turn the leg over to him, intending to renege on the agreement later. When Whisnant learns of this, he refuses to turn the leg over and begins going on local radio to make fun of John and mock Tom's death. Whisnant reveals that, as a child, his father was one of the few people in town not employed by Tom Wood's furniture business, and that he has always resented never being invited to birthday parties at John's house. Whisnant's friends and family indicate that his desire to be a beloved celebrity stems from the severe physical and emotional abuse he suffered at the hands of his father.

Both men become fixated on the leg to the extent that it interferes with their personal lives. Depression over the incident leads John further into drug abuse, and he ends up homeless and living under a bridge. Whisnant becomes obsessed with marketing himself to the local community as "The Foot Man", spending money on shirts, fliers, and other promotional merchandise for a business venture that doesn't exist yet. His wife tells him that she is considering divorcing him due to his behavior; Whisnant retorts that he will be happy and productive once he is famous and has his own television show.

In 2006, Judge Mathis learns of the feud between the men and agrees to have them on his show. Mathis chastises Whisnant for his behavior and orders him to return the leg to John, but tells John that he must reimburse Whisnant $5,000 for the cost of the storage shed. Noticing that John has arrived to court high on drugs, Mathis offers to help him get treatment. John agrees and Mathis pays for him to go to a rehab facility. John successfully recovers from his addictions, returns to work, and gets engaged. An area vet agrees to taxidermy the leg for him, and John completes the memorial to his father.

Whisnant remains bitter over the loss of the leg and continues trying to make himself a local celebrity. He is hired to appear on a reality television show, but gets into an argument with the producers when he learns that aspects of the show are staged. He finally concludes that the barbecue grill in which he found the leg is cursed, and decides that he can only lift the curse by throwing it into the ocean. The film ends with Whisnant going on talk radio to announce his candidacy for President of the United States in the 2016 Presidential Election.

== Aftermath ==
Whisnant continued to promote himself as "The Foot Man" for the next ten years, selling merchandise, appearing on podcasts, and attempting to sell a book of essays. In 2014 he was arrested after employees saw him driving around a Wells Fargo brandishing a .38 revolver; he was later released into the care of a local hospital for unspecified reasons. After years of struggling with morbid obesity, Whisnant suffered a fatal heart attack in November 2016. He was memorialized by Film School Rejects, on whose podcast he appeared after the film came out.

== Reception ==
As of August 2016, the film had a 98% rating on the review aggregator website Rotten Tomatoes. Writing for RogerEbert.com, Nick Allen wrote "“Finders Keepers” succeeds with a staggering amount of empathy when its narrative focuses on more than a prized foot, and centers on two men experiencing life phenomenons bigger than them."
