= Mark Palansky =

Canadian film director

- Born: Toronto, Ontario, Canada
- Occupations: film director, screenwriter
- Years active: 1998–present
- Spouse: Tara Palansky

Mark Palansky is a Canadian film director and screenwriter. He got his start working as an assistant director on film productions such as Armageddon and Pearl Harbor. He then worked as a second unit director on The Island and The Amityville Horror.

His directorial debut was a 2001 short film called The Same starring Josh Hartnett. The short film was later featured on in the 2005 compilation film Stories of Lost Souls. Palansky made his big screen debut in 2006 with the modern day fairytale Penelope, starring Christina Ricci as a young blueblood cursed with a pig snout. The film received mixed reviews from critics.

In October 2009, it was announced that Palansky was set to direct for Sony Pictures Entertainment an action-adventure film Iron Jack, a project that sparked a bidding war in 2008. The story takes place in the 1930s and tells of a renowned novelist and his quest to unearth a legendary treasure. Sony picked up up-and-coming screenwriter Johnny Rosenthal's spec script for $1.25 million against $2 million, beating offers made from CBS Films, MGM and Spyglass. No production schedule was announced for the film and no further development has been made as of January 2019.

In a 2008 interview, Palansky revealed that he was working on two other projects with actor Peter Dinklage. These were Mendel's Dwarf, described as a scientific love story, and Hop Frog, based on the short story by Edgar Allan Poe The latter was set to start principal photography in the second half of 2016, with the title changed to The Jester. In 2017, he directed Dinklage in the science fiction-drama Rememory. That same year, he directed a two-part episode of the Netflix series A Series of Unfortunate Events, based on the book series by Lemony Snicket.

== Filmography ==
- 1999: Shutter
- 2001: The Same
- 2006: Penelope
- 2017: Rememory

=== Currently unreleased ===
- Iron Jack
- Mendel's Dwarf
- The Jester
