= Tom O'Brien (actor) =

American actor

- Born: Thomas Patrick O'Brien; April 12, 1965 (age 61); Burbank, California, U.S.
- Occupation: Actor
- Years active: 1981–present

Thomas Patrick O'Brien (born April 12, 1965) is an American writer, director, producer, and actor. His credits include The Twilight Zone (1986), L.A. Law (1986), The Big Easy (1987), Moonlighting (1987), The Accused (1988), The Young Riders (1989), Murder She Wrote (1995), Timecop (1997), The X-Files (1997), NYPD Blue (1998), Charmed (2001), CSI: Crime Scene Investigation (2001), Smallville (2002), Stargate: SG-1 (2004), Supernatural (2008), Fairhaven (2012) and Manhattan Romance (2014).

== Early life ==
O'Brien was born April 12, 1965 in Burbank, California, U.S. He trained at the American Conservatory Theater in San Francisco.

== Career ==
O'Brien became an actor aged seventeen, he appeared in ACT's mainstage productions of The Holdup; and A Midsummer Night's Dream as Puck, opposite Annette Bening.

O'Brien's feature film acting credits include his feature film debut in The Big Easy and opposite Jodie Foster in The Accused (1988).

Other credits include The Twilight Zone (1986), L.A. Law (1986), Moonlighting (1987), The Young Riders (1989), Murder She Wrote (1995), Timecop (1997), The X-Files (1997), NYPD Blue (1998), Charmed (2001), CSI: Crime Scene Investigation (2001), Smallville (2002), Stargate: SG-1 (2004), and Supernatural (2008).

In 2012, O'Brien wrote, directed, produced and starred alongside Sarah Paulson, Chris Messina, Rich Sommer, and Alexie Gilmore in the American comedy film Fairhaven (2012).

In 2014, he again wrote, directed, produced and starred alongside Katherine Waterston, Caitlin FitzGerald and Gaby Hoffmann in the American romantic comedy-drama film Manhattan Romance (2014).

== Filmography ==
Actor

- Manhattan Romance (2014) (RomCom film O'Brien wrote, directed and starred in
- Fairhaven (2012) comedy film O'Brien wrote, directed and starred in
- Supernatural (2008) (TV Series) as Clark Adams in episode "Long-Distance Call" / dir. Robert Singer
- Stargate: SG-1 (2004)(TV Series) as Brian Vogler in episode "Covenant" / dir. Martin Wood
- Stephen King's Dead Zone (2004)(TV Series) recurring as Dr. Jaeger opposite Anthony Michael Hall in episode "Tipping Point"
- The Perfect Husband: The Laci Peterson Story (2004)(TV Movie) as Detective Frank Ross
- DC Sniper: 23 Days of Fear (2003)(TV Movie) as Lieutenant Jacobs opposite Charles Dutton
- Smallville (2002)(TV Series) recurring as reporter Roger Nixon (5 episodes)
- Philly (2001)(TV Series) as Tom McGuire in episode "Light My Fire"
- Charmed (2001)(TV Series) as Zile in episode "Bride and Gloom"
- CSI: Crime Scene Investigation (2001)(TV Series) as Max Duncan in episode "And Then There Were None"
- Facade (2000) as Bob Kelner opposite Eric Roberts / dir. Carl Colpaert
- Strange World (1999)(TV Series) as Daryl Jamison / dir. Peter Markle
- The Strip (1999)(TV Series) as Tony Kalunian (2 episodes)
- NYPD Blue (1998)(TV Series) as Gary Walker in episode "A Box of Wendy" / dir. Mark Tinker
- Daybreak (1998)(TV Series) pilot regular / dir. Tucker Gates
- Soldier of Fortune, Inc. (1998)(TV Series) as Wayne Chandler in episode "Double-Edged Sword"
- The X-Files (1997)(TV Series) as Sgt. Louis Frisch in episodes "Max" and "Tempus Fugit" / dirs. Rob Bowman and Kim Manners
- Dark Skies (1997)(TV Series) as Kellog in episode "White Rabbit"
- JAG (1997)(TV Series) as Captain Cahill in episode "We the People"
- Timecop (1997)(TV Series) recurring as Ian Pascoe (3 episodes)
- The Big Easy (1996)(TV Series) Guest Star
- The Last Best Place (1996)(TV Movie) Jake
- Maloney (1996)(TV Series) as Henry Vanderwald in episode "Night of the Gardenia"
- Early Edition (1996)(TV Series) as Kurt Porter in episode "Gun"
- Murder She Wrote (1995)(TV Series) as Jason Giles in episode "Home Care"
- Baby Brokers (1994)(TV Movie) as Frankie Dees / dir. Mimi Leder
- For Love and Glory (1993)(TV Movie) as Christian Morgan / dir. Roger Young
- Crash Landing: The Rescue of Flight 232 (1992)(TV Movie) as Chris Porter opposite Charlton Heston / dir. Lamont Johnson
- Son of the Morning Star (1991)(TV Mini-Series) as Charlie Reynolds / dir. Mike Robe
- Bar Girls (1990) as Jack Gallagher / dir. Eric Laneuville
- Love and Lies (1990) as Tom / dir. Roger Young
- Island Son (1990)(TV Series) Guest Star in episode "Icarus Falling"
- Storm and Sorrow (1990) as John Roskelly / dir. Richard A. Colla
- Flashback (1990) as Agent Phil Praeger / dir. Franco Amurri
- The Young Riders (1989)(TV Series) as Jed in episode "False Colors"
- Men (1989), ABC series regular as Officer Danny McDaniel
- Physical Evidence (1989), as Matt Farley with Burt Reynolds and Theresa Russell
- The Accused (1988), as Best Actress Academy Award Winner Jodie Foster's boyfriend Larry
- Satisfaction (1988), as Hubba Lee with Justine Bateman
- The Big Easy (1987), as Bobby McSwain / dir. Jim McBride
- Moonlighting (1987)(TV Series) as Inmate in episode "Cool Hand Dave: Part 1"
- 21 Jump Street (1987)(TV Series) as Jake Whitaker/Danny Jacobson in episode "Low and Away"
- Stingray (1987)(TV Series) as Joey Lane in episode "Bring Me the Hand That Hit Me"
- Thirtysomething (1987)(TV Series) as Dave Firland, the Carpenter in episode "Housewarming"
- The Twilight Zone (1986)(TV Series) as Mickey Shaunessy in episode "The Convict's Piano"
- L.A. Law (1986)(TV Series Pilot), as Justin Pregerson / dir. Gregory Hoblit
- Call to Glory (1984)(TV Series Pilot), ABC series regular as Patrick Thomas

Writer, director, actor, and co-producer

- Manhattan Romance (2014) RomCom: Writer, director, actor, and co-producer
- Fairhaven (2012) Comedy film: Writer, director, actor, and co-producer
