= Michael Nardelli =

American actor and producer

- Born: United States
- Occupations: Actor, film producer

Michael Nardelli is an American actor and producer.

== Early life ==
Nardelli is one of four children of Susan L. "Sue" (née Schmulbach) and businessman Bob Nardelli. He received his Bachelor of Arts degree in film and theater from the University of Southern California, and was a member of the improv troupe Groundlings.

== Career ==
Nardelli made his acting debut in an episode of Quintuplets in 2004 as "Stradivarius Helberg". He then co-starred in Derby Stallion opposite Zac Efron and later played "Daniel" in a 2009 episode of My Name Is Earl.

Nardelli began Taggart Productions and made his producing debut in 2010 with Another Happy Day. The film was directed by Sam Levinson (director Barry Levinson's son) and stars Kate Bosworth, Demi Moore, Thomas Haden Church, Ellen Burstyn, Ellen Barkin and George Kennedy. Nardelli also portrayed Kate Bosworth's brother in the film. The film received critical acclaim at the 2011 Sundance Film Festival according to The Hollywood Reporter and won the Waldo Salt Screenwriting Award for Best Screenplay for Levinson.

Nardelli also produced the 2012 romantic comedy The Giant Mechanical Man, starring Jenna Fischer, Topher Grace, Chris Messina and Malin Åkerman. and co-starred in the political comedy / true story Grassroots, starring Jason Biggs, Christopher McDonald, Tom Arnold and Cedric the Entertainer which was directed by Stephen Gyllenhaal.

In 2015, Nardelli produced the ensemble science fiction film Circle, also appearing in the film as Eric.

== Filmography ==
Year	Title	Role	Other notes
2005	The Derby Stallion	Randy Adams	
2010	Hyenas	Vinnie	
2011	Another Happy Day	Dylan	Producer
2011	Grassroots	Willis	
2012	The Collection	Josh Solomon	
2012	Chu and Blossom	Actor	
2012	The Giant Mechanical Man	--	Producer
2015	Circle	Eric	Producer
2016	Christmas in Homestead	Ian	

== Television ==
Year	Title	Role	Episode
2004	Quintuplets	Stradivarius Helberg	"(Disdainfully) the Helbergs"
2008	My Name Is Earl	Teenage Daniel	"Got the Babysitter Pregnant"
2008	Eleventh Hour	Peter Van Horn	"Agro"
2011	CSI: NY	Matthew Kane	"Get Me Out of Here!"
2012	Revenge	Trey Chandler	"Intuition"
2012	The Mob Doctor	Kyle Bennet	"Fluid Dynamics"
2019	Dark/Web	James	
