= Circle (2015 film) =

2015 American film by Aaron Hann and Mario Miscione

- Official release poster
- Directed by: Aaron Hann; Mario Miscione
- Written by: Aaron Hann; Mario Miscione
- Produced by: Justin Bursch; Scott Einbinder; Michael Nardelli; Tim Nardelli; Brent Stiefel
- Starring: Michael Nardelli; Carter Jenkins; Lawrence Kao; Allegra Masters; Julie Benz
- Cinematography: Zoran Popovic
- Edited by: Tom Campbell
- Music by: Justin Marshall Elias
- Production companies: Taggart Productions; Votiv Films
- Distributed by: FilmBuff
- Release date: May 28, 2015 (SIFF)
- Running time: 87 minutes
- Country: United States
- Language: English

Circle is a 2015 American science fiction psychological thriller film written and directed by Aaron Hann and Mario Miscione. The ensemble cast includes Carter Jenkins, Lawrence Kao, Allegra Masters, Michael Nardelli, Julie Benz, Mercy Malick, Lisa Pelikan, and Cesar Garcia. It was inspired by the 1957 drama 12 Angry Men and was shot in 2014. It premiered at the Seattle International Film Festival on May 28, 2015, before being released to video-on-demand on October 16. In the film, fifty people wake up in a darkened room, only to find that one of them is killed every two minutes or when they attempt to leave. When they realize that they can control which person is selected to die, blocs emerge based on personal values.

A sequel was announced in June 2024 and began production in June 2025.

== Plot ==
Fifty people awaken in a darkened room, arranged in two concentric circles around a black dome. When they attempt to move from their designated platforms or touch the others, alarms sound off. When someone ignores the warning and leaves formation, a beam from the dome kills them, and their body is quickly removed. As the others panic, a man attempts to calm them, but the device kills him mid-sentence. Thereafter, every two minutes, another person is killed. After several people die, the group realizes that the room's technology allows them to use hand gestures to vote for who dies, while arrows on the floor show each person their own vote but not others'. They attempt to boycott the vote, but someone is randomly selected to die after two minutes.

Following a college student's suggestion, the group buys time to think by deciding in advance to eliminate the elderly for the next selections. The captives discuss where they are, how they got there, who has abducted them, and why. A young man, Eric, remembers attempting to flee Los Angeles, and others concur. Eric says that he was pulled into the air, later waking in a red room with other humans. The old man next in line agrees, saying he saw and heard aliens. The disbelieving group eliminates him instead of listening.

After the college student aggressively targets a 52-year-old cancer survivor over the objections of people who do not consider her elderly, he is eliminated. Several people say they recognize the others: a man identifies the woman next to him as his wife, another man identifies the doctor he was having an affair with, and a tattooed man is eliminated after he admits to a cop's accusation of domestic violence. After several minorities are quickly eliminated, an African-American man claims the process has become racist. Several others dispute this, but when the cop goes on a racist rant, he is selected next.

The captives experiment with voting, find they cannot vote for themselves, and attempt to give one vote to every person in the circle. One man gives a second vote for a pregnant woman, so Eric votes for him; this causes a tie and the man is killed in a run-off vote. After several take their own lives by leaving formation to buy the others time, an atheist antagonizes the theists who praised the volunteers' faith. The atheist is briefly saved, but when he mocks the girl beside him for having her boss pay for her breast enlargement, he is killed. A homophobic lawyer targets a lesbian, and he is killed as a result. The group realizes that one of the final two people left must not vote (and be killed) to render a winner.

The group creates a schism. One bloc (led by Eric, a Marine, a one-armed man) believes that everyone should sacrifice themselves to save a pregnant woman and a little girl, while the other bloc (led by a bearded man and a banker) wants to eliminate them immediately as a threat to their survival, as they believe everyone is equal and no special privileges should be afforded. After eliminating a Spanish translator, a Hispanic immigrant and the little girl tie, resulting in him sacrificing his own life. The husband is forced to vote with Eric's bloc when they threaten to eliminate his wife, but, under interrogation, the couple admit that they concocted the relationship to curry favor, resulting in the "husband's" elimination.

Eric's faction incurs heavy losses after a five-way tie but eliminates the other faction, leaving only Eric, the pregnant woman, the girl, and a silent man who has never voted. Eric theorizes that aliens have used the process to learn about humanity's values. After the silent man is eliminated, Eric and the girl agree to simultaneously sacrifice themselves. As the girl dies by suicide, Eric instead casts a last-second vote to kill the pregnant woman, only to realize that the pregnant woman's unborn child counts as a person. Eric votes to kill the child and then wakes up in Los Angeles where he joins a group of people, composed primarily of children and pregnant women, watching a fleet of alien crafts float over Los Angeles.

== Cast ==
- Allegra Masters as Pregnant woman
- Aimee McKay as Beth
- Ashley Key as Young girl
- Autumn Federici as Woman #4
- Bill Lewis as Oldest man
- Brent Stiefel as Young man
- Cameron Connerty as Guy
- Carter Jenkins as College guy
- Cesar Garcia as Raul Jimenez
- Coley Mustafa Speaks as African American man
- Daniel Lench as Rich guy
- Daniel Yelsky as Shaun
- David Reivers as Bruce
- David Saucedo as Hispanic man
- Demaris Gordon as Older woman #2
- Emilio Rossal as Man #3
- Fay DeWitt as Old woman
- Floyd Foster Jr as Old man #2
- Gloria M. Sandoval as Foreign woman
- Han Nah Kim as Asian girl
- Howard S. Miller as Old man liar/Howard
- Jacquelyn Houston as Susan
- Jamie Lee Redmon as Teenage girl
- Jay Hawkins as Panicking man
- John Edward Lee as Counter
- Jordi Vilasuso as Soldier
- Julie Benz as Wife
- Kaiwi Lyman-Mersereau as Bearded man
- Kevin Sheridan as Man #1
- Kurt Long as Deacon
- Lawrence Kao as Asian kid
- Leandra Terrazzano as Woman #2
- Lisa Pelikan as Cancer survivor
- Marc Cedric Smith as Pilot
- Marisol Ramirez as Woman #1
- Matt Corboy as Craig
- Mercy Malick as Lesbian
- Michael DiBacco as Cop
- Michael McLafferty as Lawyer
- Michael Nardelli as Eric
- Molly Jackson as Katie
- Muneer Katchi as Silent man
- Nasrin Mohammedi as Muslim woman
- Rebecca Rivera as Translator
- Rene Heger as Atheist
- Rory Uphold as Woman #3
- Sara Sanderson as Christina
- Shane Spalione as Man #2
- Vijaya Kumari as Quiet woman
- Zachary Rukavina as One-armed man

== Production ==
The script was inspired by 12 Angry Men. Producer and star Nardelli, already a fan of the directors' webseries The Vault, became involved after they pitched the script to him. Pre-production took about three years. Nardelli said he was impressed with the script's ability to cover political, social, and psychological issues. In comparing it to Cube, he said Circle provides more answers and gives more of a definitive ending. Casting for some roles was broad, and others were specific; the intention was always to have a wide cross-section. The writer-directors did not intend for any character to be outright villainous, though several espouse intolerant opinions. Hann and Miscione wanted to address topical issues and provide a cynically tinged, antagonistic presence for the film. Principal photography began in February 2014 and lasted two weeks. All of the scenes were storyboarded prior to shooting, and the directors tried to be as prepared as possible; regardless, they still encountered problems, as all actors had to be available for every shoot. Nardelli said that the psychological extremes experienced by the cast made it difficult to wind down after shooting.

After the film was released on Netflix, the writers and director opened a verified Q&A on Reddit. Among the many topics covered, the writers spoke about the artistic and logistical reasons behind shooting in one room, and the benefits of using unknown actors.

== Release ==
Circle premiered on May 28, 2015, at the Seattle International Film Festival. FilmBuff released it to video-on-demand on October 16.

== Critical reception ==
On the review aggregator website Rotten Tomatoes, 57% of 7 critics' reviews are positive, with an average rating of 4.2/10.

John DeFore of The Hollywood Reporter called it a "Twilight Zone-y drama [that] works better than expected". Tony Kay of City Arts Online wrote: "The movie engineers suspense expertly, and there's puzzle-box fun in trying to piece together exactly what's going on as each prospective execution barrels forward". Ain't It Cool News wrote that although it is not "a fully realized concept", it is "thought-provoking" and provocative. Valeria Koulikova of the Queen Anne & Magnolia News wrote: "While the film's attempts to address social problems are beautifully done, leaving a bit of uncertainty in the end would have made a stronger finale".
