= Natalie Gold =

American actress (active 2001– )

- Education: New World School of the Arts; Emerson College
- Occupation: Actress
- Years active: 2001–present

Natalie Gold is an American actress who has appeared in film, television, and stage productions, including on Broadway.

== Early life and education ==
Gold grew up in Miami, Florida, and studied theatre at the New World School of the Arts and Emerson College.

== Career ==
In New York, she has appeared on and off Broadway in Appropriate, Kyoto, Fever Chart, The Language of Trees, Distracted, Peace for Mary Frances, Kill Floor, and Howard Katz.

She is best known for playing Rava Roy on the HBO series Succession and Julia Harwell on the AMC thriller series Rubicon, as well as for appearances on The Walking Dead: World Beyond, The Leftovers, The Americans, Wu-Tang: An American Saga, Alpha House, BrainDead, East New York, Sneaky Pete, and The Good Wife.

She has appeared in films including Before the Devil Knows You're Dead (2007), Love & Other Drugs (2010), I Don't Know How She Does It (2011), Birdman (2014), Collateral Beauty (2016), and The Land of Steady Habits (2018).

== Acting credits ==
=== Film ===
Year	Title	Role	Notes
2004	Noise	Divorced woman	
2007	Before the Devil Knows You're Dead	Secretary	
2009	The International	Assistant District Attorney	Uncredited
2010	Love & Other Drugs	Dr. Helen Randall	
2011	Almost Perfect	Karen	
2011	I Don't Know How She Does It	Young Mother with Cell Phone	
2012	Fairhaven	Jill	
2014	Birdman	Clara	
2014	Hungry Hearts	Lawyer Jennifer Donadio	
2016	Collateral Beauty	Adam's mom	
2017	Rough Night	Carmen	Uncredited
2017	Becks	Lizzy	
2018	Unsane	Female patient	
2018	The Land of Steady Habits	Dana	
2018	Rich Boy, Rich Girl	Jackie	
2019	Fair Market Value	Ms. Turner	
2023	Ex-Husbands	Heather	

=== Television ===
Year	Title	Role	Notes
2003, 2005, 2010, 2011	Law & Order: Criminal Intent	Claudia, Maya, Interviewer, Danielle Magee	4 episodes
2005	Without a Trace	Paramedic	Episode: "Showdown"
2006, 2023, 2025	Law & Order	Alex / Megan Wallace	3 episodes
2006	Six Degrees	Paramedic #1	Episode: "Masquerade"
2007–2008	Guiding Light	Suzie	4 episodes
2009	Important Things with Demetri Martin	Wife 1	Episode: "Power"
2009	The Good Wife	Anna Loeb	Episode: "Unorthodox"
2010	Rubicon	Julia Harwell	7 episodes
2013	Killing Kennedy	Ruth Paine	Television film
2013–2014	Alpha House	Katherine Sims	15 episodes
2014	The Americans	Leanne Connors	2 episodes
2014–2017	The Leftovers	Sam's mother	5 episodes
2015	Elementary	Sarah Penley	Episode: "Under My Skin"
2015	Good Girls Revolt	Angie	Television film
2016	BrainDead	Jules	3 episodes
2018	Sneaky Pete	Gayle Porter	Episode: "The Sinister Hotel Room Mystery"
2018–2023	Succession	Rava Roy	12 episodes
2020	New Amsterdam	Gretchen Cafferty	Episode: "A Matter of Seconds"
2020	Platonic	Rebecca	Episode: "Episode 8: Not a Match"
2020–2021	The Walking Dead: World Beyond	Dr. Lyla Belshaw	8 episodes
2022	Bull	Jill White	Episode: "With These Hands"
2022–2023	East New York	Dr. Faith Sorenson	3 episodes
2023	Wu-Tang: An American Saga	Beth	Episode: "Triumph"
2024	American Horror Stories	Riva	Episode: "Backrooms"

=== Theatre ===
Year	Title	Role	Venue	Ref.
2002	Twelfth Night	Ensemble / Maria	Delacorte Theater	
2006	Festen	Helen / Else / Pia / Mette (replacement)	Music Box Theatre	
2007	Howard Katz	Nat / Jess	Laura Pels Theater	
2008	The Fever Chart	Tanya Langer	The Public Theater	
2008	The Language of Trees	Loretta	Black Box Theater	
2009	Distracted	Dr. Zavala / Waitress / Carolyn / Nurse	Laura Pels Theater	
2013	Scarcity	Ellen	Rattlestick Playwrights Theater	
2015	Kill Floor	Sarah	Claire Tow Theater	
2018	Peace for Mary Frances	Rosie	Alice Griffin Jewel Box Theatre	
2023	Appropriate	Rachel	Helen Hayes Theatre; Belasco Theatre	
2025	Kyoto	Shirely	Lincoln Center Theatre	
