= Lou Liberatore =

American actor (born 1959)

Lou Liberatore (born 1959) is an American actor.

A graduate of Fordham University, Liberatore made his New York City stage debut in the 1982 Circle Repertory Company production of Richard II. As a permanent member of the company he appeared in The Great Grandson of Jebediah Kohler, Black Angel, and As Is and Burn This, both of which transferred to Broadway. The latter earned him both Tony and Drama Desk Award nominations for Best Featured Actor in a Play. He also appeared off-Broadway in Sight Unseen.

Liberatore's television credits include Tales of the City, Who's the Boss?, Sex and the City, Law & Order, and the made-for-TV movies If It's Tuesday, It Still Must Be Belgium, Original Sin, Baby Brokers, and Tom Clancy's Op Center. He also appeared in the film It's My Party.

== Filmography ==
=== Film ===
| Year | Title | Role | Notes |
|---|---|---|---|
| 1987 | If It's Tuesday, It Still Must Be Belgium | Marty Bacon | TV movie |
| 1994 | Baby Brokers | Tom Culbert | TV movie |
| 1995 | Tom Clancy's Op Center | Surveillance Technician | TV movie |
| 1996 | It's My Party | Joel Ferris | |

=== Television ===
| Year | Title | Role | Notes |
|---|---|---|---|
| 1993 | Tales of the City | Chuck | Miniseries |
