= RD Covers (Live) =

EP by Rob Deniel
- Released: October 29, 2025
- Genre: OPM
- Length: 22:50
- Language: Tagalog
- Label: Vicor
- Producer: Jean-Paul Verona

RD Covers (Live) is a debut live extended play (EP) by the Filipino singer-songwriter Rob Deniel. It was released on October 29, 2025, through Vicor Music. It contains four tracks, all of which are cover versions of songs originally performed by Filipino artists such as Ogie Alcasid and Jaya. It was produced all tracks by Jean-Paul Verona.

== Background and release ==
On September 15, 2025, Rob Deniel announced the release of his single "Ikaw Sana," which came released on September 17, 2025. The track is a cover of Ogie Alcasid song originally released in 2001 on the collaboration album A Better Man with Regine Velasquez. He also performed the song as part of a Wishclusive session for Wish 107.5, in tribute to Alcasid. He also performed in a concert with Arthur Nery, Amiel Sol, and Adie titled "RAAA," an acronym formed from their first names. The concert took place at the Araneta Coliseum on December 5, 2025.

Following the release of "Ikaw Sana," Deniel released the debut EP with consisting of four tracks on October 29, 2025, by Vicor Music.

== Composition ==
RD Covers (Live) is twenty-two minutes and fifty seconds total running time. The EP features four cover versions of Original Pilipino Music tracks including Ogie Alcasid's "Nandito Ako" (lit. 'I'm Here'), "Ikaw Sana" (transl. Hope You), and "Bakit Ngayon Ka Lang" (transl. Why Only Now?), along with Jaya's "Wala Na Bang Pag-Ibig" (transl. Is There No More Love?). All of the tracks was performed and recorded live with Deniel's band.

== Track listing ==
RD Covers (Live) track listing
No.	Title	Writer(s)	Producer(s)	Length
1.	"Wala Na Bang Pag-Ibig"	Vehnee Saturno	Jean-Paul Verona	4:37
2.	"Bakit Ngayon Ka Lang"	Aaron Paul Del Rosario; Ogie Alcasid	Verona	5:45
3.	"Ikaw Sana"	Alcasid	Verona	6:27
4.	"Nandito Ako"	Del Rosario	Verona	6:01
Total length:				22:50

== Personnel ==
Credits are adapted by Tidal.

- Rob Deniel – vocal (all tracks)
- Aaron Paul Del Rosario – composer (2, 4), lyricist (2, 4)
- Ogie Alcasid – composer (2, 3), lyricist (2, 3)
- Vehnee Saturno – composer (1), lyricist (1)
