= Jonathan Hogan =

American actor

- Born: June 13, 1951 (age 75); Chicago, Illinois, U.S.
- Occupation: Actor
- Years active: 1976–present

Jonathan Hogan (born June 13, 1951) is an American actor.

Born and raised in Chicago, Illinois, Hogan made his New York City stage debut in the off-Broadway Circle Repertory Company's highly successful production of The Hot l Baltimore. He remained with the company for Fifth of July (for which he composed the incidental music), Balm in Gilead (sharing a Drama Desk Award for Outstanding Ensemble Acting), Burn This, and As Is, all of which eventually transferred to Broadway. The last garnered him Drama Desk and Tony Award nominations as Best Actor in a Play. Additional Broadway credits include Comedians, The Caine Mutiny Court Martial, and The Homecoming.

Hogan's television credits include stints on soap operas The Doctors, Ryan's Hope, As the World Turns, and One Life to Live and appearances on L.A. Law, Quantum Leap, Law & Order: Criminal Intent, Law & Order: Special Victims Unit, Law & Order: Trial by Jury, the original Law & Order, in which he has been a guest star four times, and House of Cards.
