= The Giant Mechanical Man =

2012 film by Lee Kirk

- Theatrical poster
- Directed by: Lee Kirk
- Written by: Lee Kirk
- Produced by: Jenna Fischer; Molly Hassell; Michael Nardelli; Brent Stiefel
- Starring: Jenna Fischer; Chris Messina; Malin Åkerman; Topher Grace
- Cinematography: Doug Emmett
- Edited by: Robert Komatsu
- Music by: Rich Ragsdale
- Production companies: Taggart Productions; Votiv Films; Two Tall Boots
- Distributed by: Tribeca Films
- Release date: April 27, 2012
- Running time: 94 minutes
- Country: United States
- Language: English
- Budget: $900,000
- Box office: $7,396

The Giant Mechanical Man is an American romantic comedy film written and directed by Lee Kirk. It debuted at the 2012 Tribeca Film Festival and was distributed by Tribeca Films.

== Plot ==
Janice is a woman in her 30s who has yet to learn how to navigate adulthood. Tim, a devoted street artist, finds that being a silver-painted street performer doesn't pay the bills. His chosen career leads his girlfriend to break up with him. Janice is evicted from her apartment and forced to move in with her overbearing sister, Jill. Janice receives pressure to date an egotistical self-help guru called Doug. She meets Tim when they both end up working at the zoo.

As Janice and Tim begin working together at the zoo, they slowly develop a lighthearted connection that evolves into a quality friendship. After bumping into each other by coincidence a couple of times away from work, they eventually agree to go out on a date. The date goes exceedingly well and they end up sleeping together, then go on to develop a great connection via conversation afterward.

Janice's sister, Jill, then tries to create a relationship between Janice and Doug. Janice has no interest but ends up on a semi-forced date with Doug. Janice walks by Tim while he's in his Mechanical Man costume and does not realize it is him. As they turn the corner out of Tim's line of sight, Doug has his arm around her and finds this the opportune moment to go in for a kiss. Janice declines his advances, but Tim, unfortunately, does not see her do that. Tim is very hurt and cuts off contact with Janice, which is confusing to her since she has no idea that he saw her with Doug.

As she leaves a movie theater, where Tim was supposed to join her and meet Jill, she sees the Giant Mechanical Man again and takes the opportunity to confess her situation to him. As she continues talking, he reveals himself to be Tim, and they clasp hands as they face each other and smile.

== Cast ==
- Jenna Fischer as Janice
- Chris Messina as Tim
- Topher Grace as Doug, a pompous motivational speaker
- Malin Åkerman as Jill, Janice's sister who wants her to date Doug
- Lucy Punch as Pauline, Tim's ex-girlfriend
- Bob Odenkirk as Mark, Pauline's brother
- Rich Sommer as Brian, Jill's significant other
- Sean Gunn as George, Janice's former boss
- Travis Schuldt as Hal Baker

== Production ==
Filming began in November 2010 in Detroit, Michigan. Kirk had imagined setting the film during Autumn in Chicago but instead filmed in during Winter in Detroit as Michigan tax incentives made it more affordable to shoot there. The film was shot over 19 days. Many scenes were shot in the Detroit Zoo.

== Reception ==
On review aggregator Rotten Tomatoes, the film has an approval rating of 70% based on 23 reviews, with an average rating of 5.60/10. On Metacritic it has a weighted average score of 43% based on reviews from 23 critics, indicating "mixed or average reviews".

John Anderson of Variety gave the film a positive review, stating that the film "will meet most audiences' standards for 'charming.'" Anderson also noted that Grace's "hair-flipping delivery virtually steals the movie."

Mike McGranaghan of The Aisle Seat gave the film three out of four stars, stating that "Jenna Fischer and Chris Messina do exceptional work here, making the characters immensely likable. You can relate to them even if you've never quite walked a mile in their shoes. The stars share a nice chemistry as well, creating a bond that brings real warmth to the story's emotional ending." McGranaghan noted that the film "wears its indie quirks on its sleeve a little too much. Some of those quirks feel forced, especially the stuff with Topher Grace's self-possessed creep."
