= Rob Deniel =

Filipino singer-songwriter (born 2003)

- Born: Rob Deniel Barrinuevo; October 6, 2003 (age 22); San Pablo, Laguna
- Origin: Laguna, Philippines
- Genres: Indie-pop; Rock; OPM
- Occupations: Singer; songwriter; musician
- Instruments: Vocals; guitar
- Years active: 2020–present
- Label: Viva

Rob Deniel A. Barrinuevo (born October 6, 2003) is a Filipino singer-songwriter and multi-instrumentalist. He signed a record deal in 2020 under Viva Records. In September 2020, he released his debut single "Baby I Tried", which was followed with the release of "Ulap" the following week.

His song, "Miss Miss" debuted at number 25 on Billboard Top Philippine Songs for the week of August 3, while "RomCom" debuted at number 24 at the same chart where it first relaunched on July 6, 2024. He regained mainstream popularity when he performed two of Ogie Alcasid's songs, "Ikaw Sana" and "Nandito Ako" at the 10th Wish Music Awards, in which the former was released as a track eight months later and debuted at number six on the Billboard Top Philippine Songs in 2025.

The latter was released the following month, as a track on his extended play RD Covers (Live). It debuted at number ten on the Philippines Hot 100 and number four on the Top Philippine Songs.

== Early life and education ==
Rob Deniel A. Barrinuevo was born on October 6, 2003 in San Pablo, Laguna. He went to Mapúa Malayan Colleges Laguna and Blessed Christian School in Laguna. His father gave him his first guitar as a gift on his twelfth birthday.

== Career ==
In June 2020, at the age of 16, Rob independently released his debut single, "Ulap" (Cloud). He recorded the song in his bedroom using a mobile phone and the GarageBand app, handling both vocals and instrumentation himself. The track gained significant attention on platforms like SoundCloud and YouTube, leading to his signing with Viva Records in October 2020.

In March 2023, Rob released his single, "Ang Pag-ibig" (The Love). Two days later, he released the music video of the song, which features Rob and Karina Bautista. On August, he released his new single "RomCom". He cited the movie "La La Land" as the inspiration for the song, contrasting it with a happy ending in the song. He also released the music video of the song and features Bini member Maloi Ricalde, Vladia Dusuanco, Hyacinth Callado, and Sam Benwick. On December, he released his single, "Miss Miss".

In February 2024, Rob was featured in the ILYSM: A Valentine Harana Concert, along with other singers, like Arthur Nery, Adie, mrld, Janine Teñoso, & rhodessa. On June, he collaborated with Janine Teñoso and released their single, "Distansya" (Distance). On September, Rob released his single titled "Arrowmance".

In April 2025, Rob released his single "Puso" (Heart), which serves as a follow-up to his previous singles. He was also featured in the SWABE cover album alongside artists like Earl Agustin, Amiel Sol, Janine Teñoso, and Rhodessa, performing a cover of Hotdog's song, "Ikaw Ang Miss Universe Ng Buhay Ko".

In September 2025, Rob released a performance cover video of Ogie Alcasid's song, "Ikaw Sana" (lit. 'Hope It is You'), in which it coincided with its release of the track in all platforms after performing two of the latter's songs (Note: Including "Nandito Ako") at the 10th Wish Music Awards in January. The following month, he released his debut live extended play, titled RD Covers (Live), where it consists three of Alcasid's songs and Jaya's Wala Na Bang Pag-Ibig (lit. 'Is There No Love Anymore'), following his cover that was peaked at number six at the Billboard Top Philippine Songs.

He hosted alongside Arthur Nery, Amiel Sol, and Adie, and performed in a concert titled 'RAAA' (Note: Which stands for Rob, Arthur, Amiel, and Adie) at the Araneta Coliseum on December 5.

== Artistry ==
Rob cites musical influences such as Elvis Presley, Apo Hiking Society, Harry Styles, Rey Valera, and The Beatles. He stated that, "I was really shy about it when I was little but I really love performing like singing and dancing a little."

== Accolades ==
Award	Year	Category	Recipient(s)	Result	Ref.
Wish Music Awards	2025	Wish Song Collaboration of the Year	"Distansya" (with Janine Teñoso)	Nominated	
Wish Music Awards	2025	Wishclusive Rock/Alternative Performance of the Year	"RomCom"	Nominated	

== Discography ==
=== Studio albums ===
List of studio albums, with release date, label, and format shown
Title	Details	Ref.
Wander Boy	Released: February 13, 2026; Label: Vicor Music; Format: digital download, streaming	

=== Live albums ===
List of live albums, with release date, label, and format shown
Title	Details	Ref.
RD Covers (Live)	Released: October 29, 2025; Label: Vicor Music; Format: digital download, streaming	

=== Singles ===
List of singles, showing year released, selected chart positions, and associated albums
Title	Year	Peak chart positions				Album	Ref.
Title	Year	PHL	HOT 100	PHL Top	IFPI	Album	Ref.
"Ulap"	2020	—	—	—	—	Non-album singles	
"Gabi"	2020	—	—	—	—	Non-album singles	
"Baby I Tried"	2020	—	—	—	—	Non-album singles	
"Ang Rosas"	2021	—	—	—	—	Non-album singles	
"Darling, Darling"	2021	—	—	—	—	Non-album singles	
"Diwa"	2021	—	—	—	—	Non-album singles	
"Kundiman"	2022	—	—	—	—	Non-album singles	
"Sinta"	2022	—	—	—	—	Non-album singles	
"Ang Pag-ibig"	2023	—	—	—	—	Non-album singles	
"RomCom"	2023	21	42	24	—	Non-album singles	
"Miss Miss"	2023	14	36	20	—	Non-album singles	
"Distansya" (with Janine Teñoso)	2024	—	—	—	—	Non-album singles	
"Arrowmance"	2024	—	—	—	—	Non-album singles	
"Happy Ending"	2024	—	—	—	—	Non-album singles	
"Puso"	2025	—	—	—	—	Non-album singles	
"Simoy"	2025	—	—	—	—	100 Awit Para Kay Stella (OST)	
"Iisang Daan" (with Kyle Echarri)	2025	—	—	—	—	100 Awit Para Kay Stella (OST)	
"Kumusta Na"	2025	—	—	—	—	100 Awit Para Kay Stella (OST)	
"Ikaw Sana" (Note: Cover version of Ogie Alcasid's song)	2025	—	11	5	14	RD Covers (Live)	

=== Other charted songs ===
List of other charted songs, showing year released and selected chart positions
Title	Year	Peak chart positions			Album
Title	Year	HOT 100	PHL Top	IFPI	Album
"Nandito Ako"	2025	5	2	4	RD Covers (Live)
"Wala Na Bang Pag-Ibig" (Note: Cover version of Jaya's song)	2025	20	9	—	RD Covers (Live)
