= Alex of Venice =

- Directed by: Chris Messina
- Written by: Jessica Goldberg; Katie Nehra; Justin Shilton
- Produced by: Jamie Patricof; Lynette Howell
- Starring: Mary Elizabeth Winstead; Don Johnson; Derek Luke; Katie Nehra; Chris Messina; Skylar Gaertner; Reg E. Cathey; Timm Sharp
- Cinematography: Doug Emmett
- Edited by: Amy P. McGrath
- Music by: David Wingo
- Production company: Electric City Entertainment
- Distributed by: Screen Media Films
- Release dates: April 18, 2014 (Tribeca); April 17, 2015 (United States)
- Running time: 86 minutes
- Country: United States
- Language: English
- Box office: $588

Alex of Venice is a 2014 American drama film directed by Chris Messina in his directorial debut. It is written by Jessica Goldberg, Katie Nehra, and Justin Shilton. The film stars Mary Elizabeth Winstead, Don Johnson, Katie Nehra, Chris Messina, Derek Luke, Skylar Gaertner. The film premiered at the Tribeca Film Festival on April 18, 2014, and has expanded to a few other film festivals.

The film was released in a limited release and through video on demand beginning on April 17, 2015.

== Plot ==
Alex, a young environmental lawyer in Venice, California, is working hard to support her family. Her stay-at-home husband George, an artist, decides he's unhappy and can't continue taking care of their shy school-aged son Dakota or Alex's aging father Roger. When George leaves Alex, Roger invites her wild younger sister Lily, a clothing designer, to stay with them and help look after Dakota.

Alex needs to deal with an impending legal case against Frank, a property developer with whom she has a brief sexual relationship, as well as her father's increasing forgetfulness. Roger, a former television actor who doesn't want to accept his declining acuity, is cast as the aged manservant Firs in a stage production of The Cherry Orchard by Anton Chekhov, but he struggles to remember his lines and cues. He also begins to demonstrate confusion, so his daughters take him to a doctor who gives him a brain scan.

Alex loses the legal case, and at a party afterward she takes the drug ecstasy and becomes furious with Lily when she learns that Lily has not taken Dakota to school for a week. Alex calls George and tells him that it's not safe for her to drive; he finds her high and takes her home. The next day Lily apologizes for letting Dakota skip classes. Alex forgives her and thanks her, and she tells her that George is not coming back to her but that she wants to spend more time with Dakota. George tells Dakota he will continue to be his father but won't stay with Alex. Alex tells Dakota that she and George still love him and that this will never change. Later the family attends Roger's performance, which goes well.

== Cast ==
- Mary Elizabeth Winstead as Alex
- Don Johnson as Roger
- Derek Luke as Frank
- Katie Nehra as Lily
- Chris Messina as George
- Skylar Gaertner as Dakota
- Julianna Guill as Anya
- Reg E. Cathey as Walt
- Timm Sharp as Josh
- Matthew Del Negro as James
- Michael Chernus as Trofimov
- Jennifer Jason Leigh as Maureen
- Will McCormack as Lee

== Production ==
=== Casting ===
Mary Elizabeth Winstead was cast in the film on June 12, 2013. She said of the script, "I immediately loved it. It was one of those things where I cried like 5 times when I first read it. I just felt really connected to the role and thought it was so beautifully written."

Messina approached Don Johnson to play the role of Alex's father Roger. Johnson said he "wasn't initially won over to play Alex's father," but "Chris wouldn't leave me alone – he came up to my house in North Los Angeles, and I wasn't really looking to work, so I dragged him to my boys' basketball game and made him watch, and he feigned interest." Johnson ultimately agreed, saying he was "intrigued by Messina's infectious passion" and "the material resonated with me because it had different tempos and rhythms."

Upon casting himself in the film, Messina said, "I thought there were a lot of other actors who could've done a better job [...] I was scared to do both (acting and directing), but I wanted to do it to learn what it’d be like. Maybe two weeks out, I was trying to convince Jamie [Patricof, producer] to hire somebody else!" Producers Katie Nehra and Justin Shilton had wanted Messina for the role years ago. "He was our only George," said Shilton.

=== Filming ===
Shooting began on June 17, 2013, and wrapped on July 17. Filming took place on location in Venice Beach.

Messina has stated he was inspired and influenced by several filmmakers that he has worked for before. "I would say Woody Allen and Sam Mendes were huge inspirations. [Woody] casts his movies really well and then he kind of lets you go. [...] With Sam Mendes, he said something that I quote constantly. He told me that every actor comes with a gift, and it's the director’s job to let that gift out." Messina has also named Kramer vs. Kramer, Hannah and Her Sisters and the work of John Cassavetes as "models for the film's quiet naturalism".

Messina directed the film back-to-back while shooting The Mindy Project. Of the experience, he said, "That was maybe the dumbest thing – it was grueling, and I would never do that again [...] I’d be on set at Mindy during the day and then editing at night, and constantly on the phone during breaks."

== Release ==
The film premiered at the Tribeca Film Festival on April 18, 2014. Alex of Venice was also shown at the San Francisco International Film Festival on May 8, 2014 and at the Seattle International Film Festival on June 6, 2014.

In August 2014, Alex of Venice was picked up by Screen Media Films for release in early 2015. The film was screened in a limited release and through video on demand beginning on April 17, 2015.

== Reception ==
=== Critical response ===
On the review aggregator website Rotten Tomatoes, 74% of 31 critics' reviews are positive, with an average rating of 6.1/10. The website's consensus reads: "Alex of Venice does immensely likable things with its overly familiar parts, adding up to an agreeable calling card for debuting director Chris Messina." Metacritic, which uses a weighted average, assigned the film a score of 56 out of 100, based on 10 critics, indicating "mixed or average" reviews.

Above all, the cast's performance has been highly praised by critics, with Winstead prominently singled out. Ronnie Schieb of Variety said, "Winstead gives an extraordinary performance in this uneven but pleasurably mellow indie." Yazdi Pithavala of Moviewallas.com added, "A great deal of the film’s success lies in the casting of Mary Elizabeth Winstead as the lead." Screen Invasion noted, "Winstead is quietly stunning in all of Alex's various circumstances, from bewildered, overwhelmed and frazzled, to focused, confident and accepting."

Johnson also received praise for his performance, with Lisa Rainwater of Galo Magazine saying, "Johnson's ability to slip into the skin of his characters...has been underrated far too long." Messina's directing has also been commended. The Arts Guild said, "Messina has created a film that does successfully look at a [character's] growth out of chaos".

One reviewer complained that the script "leaves many details behind" and that "the audience is left questioning the plot from the get go"; but also felt that "the performances... make up for the film's ambiguity."
