= Mark Felt: The Man Who Brought Down the White House =

2017 American biographical political thriller film

- Theatrical release poster
- Directed by: Peter Landesman
- Written by: Peter Landesman
- Based on: Mark Felt: The Man Who Brought Down the White House by Mark Felt; John O'Connor
- Produced by: Ridley Scott; Giannina Scott; Marc Butan; Anthony Katagas; Peter Landesman; Steve Richards; Jay Roach
- Starring: Liam Neeson; Diane Lane; Marton Csokas; Ike Barinholtz; Tony Goldwyn; Tom Sizemore; Bruce Greenwood; Michael C. Hall; Brian d'Arcy James; Josh Lucas; Eddie Marsan; Wendi McLendon-Covey; Maika Monroe
- Cinematography: Adam Kimmel
- Edited by: Tariq Anwar
- Music by: Daniel Pemberton
- Production companies: Mandalay Pictures; Torridon Films; MadRiver Pictures; Endurance Media; Scott Free Productions; Riverstone Pictures; Cara Films
- Distributed by: Sony Pictures Classics
- Release dates: September 8, 2017 (TIFF); September 29, 2017 (United States)
- Running time: 104 minutes
- Country: United States
- Language: English
- Box office: $4.4 million

Mark Felt: The Man Who Brought Down the White House is a 2017 American biographical political thriller film written and directed by Peter Landesman, and based on the 2006 autobiography of FBI agent Mark Felt, written with John O'Connor. The film depicts how Felt became the anonymous source nicknamed "Deep Throat" for reporters Bob Woodward and Carl Bernstein and helped them in their investigation of the Watergate scandal, which resulted in the resignation of President Richard Nixon.

The film stars Liam Neeson, Diane Lane, Tony Goldwyn, and Maika Monroe. It premiered at the Toronto International Film Festival on September 8, and was theatrically released on September 29, 2017, by Sony Pictures Classics. It is also the fourth film on the Watergate scandal, following All the President's Men (1976), The Final Days (1989), and Dick (1999).

== Plot ==
The movie starts on April 11, 1972. Nixon's advisers at the White House ask Mark Felt how to ask J. Edgar Hoover to step aside as the FBI director. Some days later, Hoover dies. Pat Gray becomes the acting FBI director. In June 1972, several ex-CIA and FBI agents burglarize Watergate hotel to bug the DNC headquarters.

Members of the Weather Underground bomb the Pentagon. Attorney General Richard Kleindienst announces that the Watergate investigation has concluded without the White House or CREEP (Nixon's re-election committee) being implicated.

Pat Gray's Senate confirmation hearings get derailed when it comes to light that he was sending the FBI investigative files to the White House. A side story of the movie revolves around Mark Felt tracking and locating his runaway hippie daughter in a commune.

== Cast ==
- Liam Neeson as Mark Felt, the FBI agent and deputy director who became "Deep Throat", the anonymous whistleblower who helped expose the Watergate scandal
- Diane Lane as Audrey Felt, Mark's brilliant and troubled wife, who shares the burden of Mark's dangerous dilemma about Watergate
- Tony Goldwyn as Ed Miller, An FBI Intel chief
- Maika Monroe as Joan Felt, Mark and Audrey's daughter
- Kate Walsh as Pat Miller, Ed's wife
- Josh Lucas as Charlie Bates, an FBI agent and Felt lieutenant who suspects that Felt is leaking classified information on the Watergate investigation
- Michael C. Hall as John Dean, the Nixon White House counsel and architect of the Watergate cover-up who was desperate to stop the Washington Post leaks
- Marton Csokas as Pat Gray, FBI Acting Director and one of Felt's rivals who then had to withdraw his nomination after destroying Watergate evidence
- Tom Sizemore as Bill Sullivan, one of Felt's rivals at the FBI
- Julian Morris as Bob Woodward, the Washington Post metropolitan reporter who teamed with Carl Bernstein to expose the Watergate dealings, and an acquaintance of Felt after meeting him as an admiral's aide while in the Navy
- Wendi McLendon-Covey as Carol Tschudy, Felt's secretary
- Ike Barinholtz as Angelo Lano, the head of the investigation
- Bruce Greenwood as Sandy Smith, Time magazine reporter
- Brian d'Arcy James as Robert Kunkel, an FBI special agent
- Noah Wyle as John Stanley Pottinger, who prosecuted Felt and other FBI officials for ordering break-ins to search homes of suspected domestic terrorist radicals without warrants
- Eddie Marsan as Agency Man

== Production ==
An untitled project about FBI agent Mark Felt, known as Deep Throat, who was an informant for reporters Bob Woodward and Carl Bernstein, was announced on January 24, 2006, written by Peter Landesman. The film was to be directed by Jay Roach for Universal Pictures and Playtone, and Tom Hanks and Gary Goetzman were attached as producers. On November 3, 2015, it was announced that Landesman would himself direct the film, which had been titled Felt. Liam Neeson was cast in the title role. MadRiver Pictures financed the film and also produced it, along with Scott Free Productions, Playtone, and Cara Films. The film was produced by Ridley Scott, Goetzman, Hanks, Giannina Scott, Marc Butan, Roach, and Landesman. On November 5, 2015, Diane Lane was cast to play Felt's brilliant and troubled wife, Audrey, who shares the burden of Felt's dangerous dilemma about the White House's Watergate scandal. On November 6, 2015, Jason Bateman joined the film to play an FBI agent and Felt lieutenant, Charlie Bates, who suspects that Felt is leaking classified information on the Watergate investigation. On December 9, 2015, Maika Monroe also joined the cast, as Felt's daughter Joan.

On April 29, 2016, a complete cast was announced; Tony Goldwyn as FBI intel chief Ed Miller; Kate Walsh as Miller's wife, Pat; Josh Lucas as Charlie Bates, replacing Bateman; Michael C. Hall as John Dean; Marton Csokas and Tom Sizemore as Felt's rivals at the FBI, Pat Gray and Bill Sullivan, respectively; Wendi McLendon-Covey as Felt's secretary, Carol Tschudy; Ike Barinholtz as head of the Watergate investigation, Angelo Lano; Bruce Greenwood as Time magazine reporter Sandy Smith; Brian d'Arcy James as FBI special agent Robert Kunkel; Noah Wyle as Stan Pottinger; and Colm Meaney and Eddie Marsan as CIA agents, though Meaney did not appear in the finished film. Felt's real-life grandson Will Felt also appears in a background cameo as a CIA agent, and Daniel Pemberton composed the film's score.

Principal photography began on May 2, 2016, in Atlanta. Filming locations included the Virginia–Highland neighborhood, Cobb Galleria, and North Druid Hills.

Cinematographer Adam Kimmel shot the film with Arri Alexa XT cameras. It was his first time using digital cameras to shoot a feature film. This was also the first film to be shot with Cooke Anamorphic/i SF (Special Flair) anamorphic lenses, which feature a special coating on the standard Anamorphic/i lenses that increase flare, bokeh, and other aberrations inherent in anamorphic. Kimmel thought these lenses helped him find a balance between a 1970s period look and a "more accessible" modern one. Because Kimmel and Landesman didn't think the 2.40:1 anamorphic aspect ratio was right for the film, it was cropped on the sides to a 2:1 ratio.

Much of Diane Lane's performance was cut due to running time constraints. At a press conference, Landesman and Liam Neeson both championed Lane's performance, saying how devastated they all were (especially Lane herself) that so much of her work was not in the finished film. There were hints that the scenes may be included as "deleted scenes" or as part of an "extended cut" on the home video release of the film.

== Release ==
In May 2017, Sony Pictures Classics acquired US distribution rights to the film, which had been retitled The Silent Man. Under the title Mark Felt: The Man Who Brought Down the White House, it premiered as part of the Special Presentations section of the 2017 Toronto International Film Festival on September 8, and was theatrically released in the United States on September 29, 2017.

=== Critical response ===
On review aggregator Rotten Tomatoes, the film holds an approval rating of 34% based on 111 reviews, with an average rating of 5.3/10. The website's critics consensus reads: "Mark Felt may dramatize the man behind Deep Throat, but its stodgy treatment of history offers little insight into the famous whistleblower." On Metacritic, the film has a weighted average score of 49 out of 100, based on 29 critics, indicating "mixed or average reviews".

Mike Ryan of Uproxx gave the film a generally positive review, praising Neeson while criticizing the script and writing, "Mark Felt: The Man Who Brought Down the White House (please get a new title) does its job of presenting who Mark Felt was and what a burden it was for him personally to betray his beloved FBI. And if you want to know more about Felt (or, maybe, you just like Liam Neeson), then Mark Felt: The Man Who Brought Down the White House does its job. But, I'd recommend anyone palette cleanse after by watching All the President's Men."
