= Maloi =

Filipino singer and dancer (born 2002)

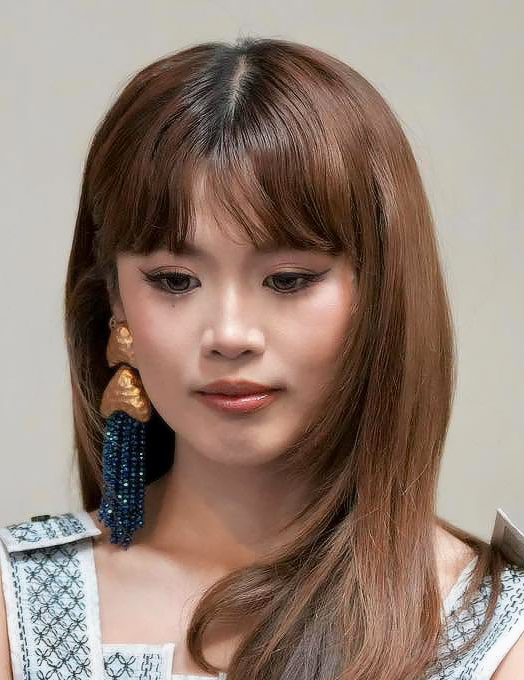
- Maloi at the Senate of the Philippines in May 2026
- Born: Mary Loi Yves Kipte Ricalde; May 27, 2002 (age 24); Lemery, Batangas, Philippines
- Occupations: Singer; performer; actress
- Years active: 2020–present
- Musical career
- Genres: P-pop; bubblegum pop; teen pop; EDM
- Instruments: Vocals
- Label: Star
- Member of: Bini
- Maloi’s voice On the podcast Podcast Ng Mga Walang Jowa (Podcast of those without a partner); Recorded July 2023

Mary Loi Yves Ricalde (born May 27, 2002), known professionally as Maloi (English: /məˈlɔɪ/, Tagalog pronunciation: [maˈlo.i]), is a Filipino singer, performer, and actress under Star Music. She is one of the main vocalists of the Filipino girl group Bini. In October 2023, Maloi appeared in the music video for "RomCom" by Rob Deniel. In February 2024, she became a regular judge for It's Showtime's Tawag ng Tanghalan Kids (transl. Call of the Stage Kids). She also starred in the music video for "Dilaw" (transl. Yellow) by Maki in May. In May 2025, she won Female TikTok Face of the Year at the 6th VP Choice Awards.

Since 2024, various publications — including Vogue Philippines, Billboard Philippines, and Rappler — have recognized a distinct fashion and lifestyle aesthetic associated with Maloi, called "Maloi-core". This encompasses style trends such as wearing red "Bayonetta glasses".

== Early life and education ==
Mary Loi Yves Ricalde was born on May 27, 2002 in Lemery, Batangas, Philippines. She started singing when she was three years old, and in school, participated in extra-curricular activities, including swimming and badminton varsity teams, serving as a majorette, and joining the school chorale. She was a member of the group when it won three gold medals as the Philippines' representative to a choral competition in Malaysia in 2018.

She completed senior high school at the Japan-Philippine Institute of Technology in Bulacan as a scholar. As of 2025, Maloi is studying communications at Thames International School. (Note: This refers to a school in Quezon City, Philippines, not the Thames International College in Nepal.)

== Career ==
In 2018, Maloi auditioned for Star Hunt Academy (SHA) in Laguna and was selected as a trainee in early 2019. On October 10, 2020, Maloi was one of the last eight trainees to graduate and was officially announced as a member of an idol group.

In November 2020, Maloi officially became a member of the Filipino girl group Bini as a main vocalist, Maloi wrote the rap section of Bini's 2021 song "Kinikilig" (transl. Smitten), along with Mikha.

In October 2023, Maloi appeared in Rob Deniel's music video for the song "RomCom", where she reenacted a scene from the Filipino romantic comedy movie A Very Special Love. In February 2024, Maloi became a regular judge for It's Showtime's Tawag ng Tanghalan Kids. On May 24, she starred in the music video for the song "Dilaw" (transl. Yellow) by Maki. The two portrayed high school students who form a romantic connection as they bond over art and adventure.

On November 30, Maloi sang "Hanggang Ngayon" (transl. Until Now) with Ogie Alcasid at the latter's concert, Ogieoke 2: Reimagined. The track was originally a duet between Alcasid and Regine Velasquez. At Maki's Manila concert in December, Maloi joined him onstage when he sang "Dilaw". He told The Philippine Star, "Dilaw would not be complete if not for Maloi." Throughout 2024, major publications recognized Maloi's strong Internet presence. Nylon Manila identified her as an online "trendsetter". Likewise, Billboard Philippines recognized her as an "it girl" and "online persona". On January 29, 2025, Village Pipol unveiled Maloi as one of their nominees for the magazine's 6th VP Choice Awards (VPCA), under the category Female TikTok Face of the Year.

On February 11, Maloi performed "Huwag na Huwag Mong Sasabihin" (transl. Don't Ever Say) with Kitchie Nadal at Nadal's gig in Marikina. On May 30, Maloi won Female TikTok Face of the Year at the VP Choice Awards.

On May 31, her fans held an event called "Everything Everywhere Maloi at Once" in Quezon City, which included Maloi-themed activities. Yzavelle Bevera, one of the organizers, told Rappler, "It's everything about art and everything that she loves and everything that we love about her." The news site reported that over 800 fans were in attendance.

On September 10, Maloi appeared as a special guest on It's Showtime alongside Colet. Maloi was one of the guest mentors on Idol Kids Philippines, which ended on September 28. On November 7, she was a surprise performer at Maki's Kolorcoaster concert at the Araneta Coliseum. They performed an "emotional" duet version of "Dilaw".

In 2026, Maloi and fellow Bini member Mikha Lim were among the lead performers at the opening ceremony of UAAP Season 89 at the SM Mall of Asia Arena.

== Other work ==
Maloi is a digital artist. In a fashion feature for Parcinq titled Imaginarium, she discussed her passion for art with the magazine's Hans Ethan Carbonilla. In June 2024, her solo Biniverse performance incorporated her paintings. She also designed the cover artwork for Bini's single "Shagidi", which was revealed on May 27, 2025.

== Personal life ==
As of 2024, Maloi lived with her parents and three siblings in General Trias. The following year, Maloi was diagnosed with polyendocrine metabolic ovarian syndrome (PMOS).

== Philanthropy ==
In December 2024, Maloi conducted an outreach program at a children's facility in Tondo, Manila, along with her fans.

== Media image ==
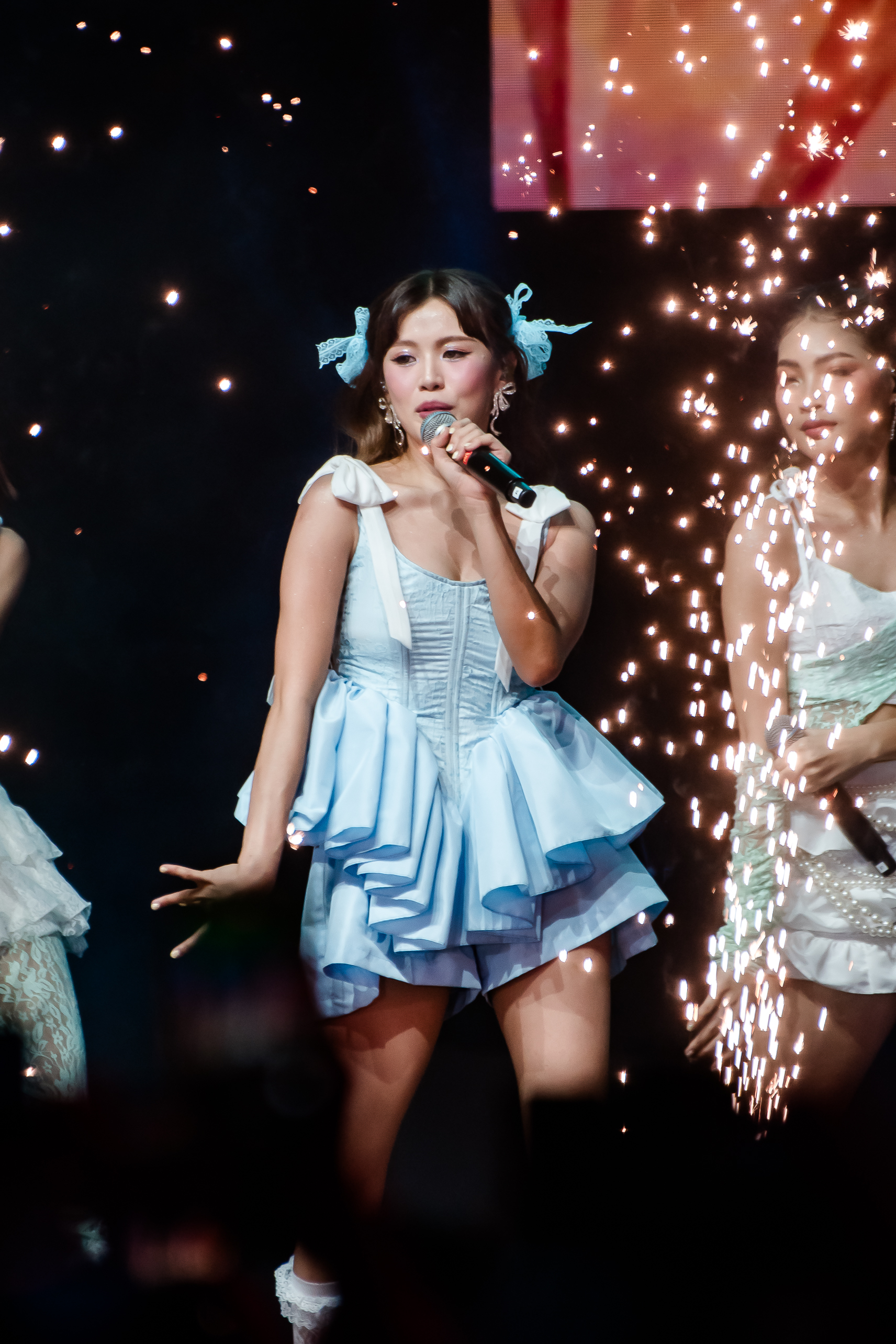
Maloi during Samsung Galaxy AI Festival 2024

Various publications have recognized Maloi for her distinctive fashion sense. In May 2024, fashion magazine Preview and youth-oriented magazine Gen-Z both described her as a "style star". Meanwhile, Nylon Manila's Nica Glorioso described her as a "style icon" in September. Glorioso credited her for being "one of the[...] pioneers" in the Philippines for a fashion trend called "Bayonetta glasses", referring to thin-framed, rectangular glasses similar to the pair often worn by the video game character after which it was named.

Roby Altura of Gen-Z wrote that Maloi's stint as a judge on Tawag ng Tanghalan established her as "the poster girl" for the coquette aesthetic. Vogue Philippines has also acknowledged the impact of Maloi's personal style in the public consciousness. Vogue writer Bianca Custodio noted in October, "Picture red Bayonetta glasses, ribbons in the hair, oversized jersey shirts paired with ankle-length skirts, and a bag covered in all kinds of charms, and you'd find it would be hard not to think of Maloi's pale pink flushed cheeks."

Vogue described the aforementioned style as "Maloi-core". Likewise, Billboard Philippines acknowledged the online popularity of the term "Maloi-core", based on Maloi's "habits and quirks". In a report about the "Everything Everywhere Maloi at Once" event, Rappler writer Bea Gatmaytan identified her fans' bracelet-crafting as Maloi-core.

== Discography ==
=== As a lead artist ===
List of singles, showing year released and associated albums
Title	Year	Album	Ref
"Here With You" (with Gwen Apuli)	2024	What's Wrong with Secretary Kim? Original Soundtrack	

=== Songwriting credits ===
List of singles, showing year released and associated albums
Title	Year	Artist	Album	Composer	Lyricist
"Kinikilig"	2021	Bini	Born to Win	No	Yes

== Filmography ==
=== Television ===
Year	Title	Role	Ref.
2024–2025	It's Showtime	Judge/Guest	
2025	Idol Kids Philippines	Mentor	

=== Music videos ===
Year	Title	Artist	Ref.
2023	"RomCom"	Rob Deniel	
2024	"Dilaw"	Maki	

== Awards and nominations ==
Award	Year	Category	Nominee(s)	Result	Ref.
JuanCast	2025	Mic Drop! Greatest Laughs: Funniest P-Pop Member	Maloi	Won	
VP Choice Awards	2025	Female TikTok Face of the Year	Maloi	Won	
VP Choice Awards	2026	Female TikTok Face of the Year	Maloi	Won	
P-pop Music Awards	2025	P-pop Favorite Fashion Icon of the Year	Maloi	Nominated	

== Listicle ==
Name of publisher, year listed, name of listicle, and placement
Publisher	Year	Listicle	Placement	Ref.
Nylon Manila	2024	6 Celebrities and Idol Groups Embodying What It Means To Be Anik-Anik Girlies	Placed	
Billboard Philippines	2025	13 Halloween Costume Ideas Inspired by Your Favorite OPM Artists	Placed	
&Asian	2025	Asian Celebs Go All Out For Halloween: Some Of Our Favourites!	Placed	
