= Baby Brokers =

- Written by: Susan Nanus
- Directed by: Mimi Leder
- Starring: Cybill Shepherd; Nina Siemaszko; Anna Maria Horsford; Jeffrey Nordling; Tom O'Brien; Joseph Maher; Shirley Knight
- Composer: Anthony Marinelli
- Country of origin: United States
- Original language: English

Production
- Producer: Boris Malden
- Cinematography: Neil Roach
- Editor: Jacque Elaine Toberen
- Running time: 100 minutes
- Production companies: Steinhardt Baer Pictures Company; BBK Productions; Columbia Pictures Television

Original release
- Network: NBC
- Release: February 21, 1994

Baby Brokers is a 1994 American true-life-event drama film directed by Mimi Leder and written by Susan Nanus. The film stars Cybill Shepherd, Nina Siemaszko, Anna Maria Horsford, Jeffrey Nordling, Tom O'Brien, Joseph Maher and Shirley Knight. The film premiered on NBC on February 21, 1994.

== Plot ==
Debbie Freeman (Shepherd) is an LA psychotherapist who wants to adopt a baby. An expectant couple, Leanne (Siemaszko) and Frankie Dees (O'Brien), who at first appear willing to let her privately adopt their child in exchange for financially supporting them for six months during Leanne's pregnancy, disappear when Freeman discovers they are in negotiations with another couple. The Dees, who gave up numerous children in the past while scamming multiple couples with each pregnancy, also run out on the latest prospective parents, leaving behind an incriminating notebook with names and phone numbers. Taking her story public, Freeman is instrumental in the Dees' arrest and Leanne's later conviction in federal court for multiple counts of mail and wire fraud. Freeman's going public with her anguish in losing a child she expected to adopt results in a woman reaching out to her to arrange a private adoption.

== Cast ==
- Cybill Shepherd as Debbie Freeman
- Nina Siemaszko as Leeanne Dees
- Anna Maria Horsford as Randi
- Jeffrey Nordling as John
- Tom O'Brien as Frankie Dees
- Joseph Maher as Leo
- Shirley Knight as Sylvia
- Gary Werntz as Dick Plager
- Leah Lail as Carly
- Lou Liberatore as Tom Culbert
- Scott Jaeck as Scott Tillman
- Lynn Milgrim as Laurie Tillman
- Peter Crook as Dr. Robert Silk
- Catherine MacNeal as Rita Hoyt
- Bob McCracken as Alan Hoyt
- Barbara Worthington as Sister Elizabeth
- Takayo Fischer as Dr. Emily Weiss
- Esther Scott as Polly O'Neill
- Patricia Childress as Angela
- Secunda Wood as Julia
- Paul Perri as Dr. Carlson
- Terry Murphy as Herself
- Lynn Milgrim as Laurie Tillman
