= Men (TV series) =

American drama television series

- Genre: Drama
- Created by: Steve Brown
- Starring: Ving Rhames; Ted Wass; Saul Rubinek; Tom O'Brien
- Country of origin: United States
- Original language: English
- No. of seasons: 1
- No. of episodes: 8 (3 unaired) (list of episodes)

Production
- Running time: 60 minutes
- Production companies: Charles E. Sellier, Jr. Productions; Cajun Productions; Universal Television

Original release
- Network: ABC
- Release: March 25 – April 22, 1989

Men is an American drama television series that aired from March 25 until April 22, 1989.

== Premise ==
A reporter, a surgeon, a lawyer and a cop bond over a weekly poker game in Baltimore.

== Cast ==
- Ted Wass as Steven Ratajkowski
- Saul Rubinek as Paul Arnas
- Ving Rhames as Charlie Hazard
- Tom O'Brien as Off. Danny McDaniel
- Kimberley Pistone as Lisa Vaneti
- Candy Ann Brown as Margaret Hazard

== Episodes ==
Only five of the eight episodes were broadcast in the US in 1989. The full series aired on the ITV network in the UK in 1990, and then in Germany in 1993.

| No. | Title | Directed by | Written by | Original release date | U.S. viewers (millions) | Rating/share (households) |
|---|---|---|---|---|---|---|
| 1 | "Men (pilot episode)" | Unknown | Unknown | Unaired in the USA | N/A | N/A |
| 2 | "Baltimore" | Peter Werner | Steve Brown | March 25, 1989 | 9.3 | 6.4/12 |
The guys mourn the death of a friend who kept them together.
| 3 | "Thomas" | Unknown | Unknown | April 1, 1989 | 6.7 | 4.8/9 |
Danny needs help with the eulogy. Paul does some research for the newspaper.
| 4 | "Occupational hazard" | Unknown | Unknown | Unaired in the USA | N/A | N/A |
| 5 | "The Trouble with Harvey" | Unknown | Unknown | April 8, 1989 | 5.7 | 4.1/8 |
When Danny suddenly disappears, the men examine their relationships with women.
| 6 | "When the Wind Blows" | Unknown | Unknown | April 15, 1989 | 5.5 | 4.2/8 |
| 7 | "Cupid Ms... Takes" | Unknown | Harry Stein | April 22, 1989 | 6.2 | 4.5/9 |
| 8 | "Every Good Boy Does Fine" | Unknown | Unknown | Unaired in the USA | N/A | N/A |
