= Angelo Lano =

American FBI agent

Angelo Joseph Lano
- Born: January 12, 1939 (age 87); United States
- Occupation: FBI special agent
- Years active: 1961–1990
- Known for: Heading the FBI investigation into the Watergate scandal
- Notable work: Testimony as a witness in the Watergate case: Ike Barinholtz in Mark Felt: The Man Who Brought Down the White House (2017); Chris Messina in Gaslit (2022)

Angelo Joseph Lano (born January 12, 1939) is a former American field agent for the Federal Bureau of Investigation (1961–1990) in Washington, D.C., notable for his work heading the investigation of, and appearing as a witness for, the Watergate scandal surrounding President Richard M. Nixon. Lano was one of a number of FBI agents who was falsely accused as a source of information for Carl Bernstein and The Washington Post during the investigation, which helped shift White House suspicions away from Mark Felt, who was revealed as informant Deep Throat on May 31, 2005.

He was portrayed by Ike Barinholtz in the 2017 film Mark Felt: The Man Who Brought Down the White House and by Chris Messina in the 2022 television series Gaslit.

== Sources ==
- Jaworski, Leon The Right and the Power: The Prosecution of Watergate, 1976 ISBN 0-88349-102-8
