= Burn This =

Play written by Lanford Wilson

- Written by: Lanford Wilson
- Characters: Anna Mann; Pale; Burton; Larry
- Original language: English
- Genre: Drama
- Setting: Lower Manhattan

Premiere
- Place premiered: Theater 890, New York City

Burn This (stylized as Burn/This for the 2019 revival) is a play by Lanford Wilson. Like much of Wilson's work, the play includes themes of gay identity and relationships.

== Plot summary ==
The play begins shortly after the funeral of Robbie, a young, gay dancer who drowned in a boating accident with his lover Dom. In attendance were Robbie's roommates: his sensitive dance partner and choreographer, Anna, and confident, gay advertising executive Larry. Soon joining them in Robbie's lower Manhattan loft are screenwriter Burton (Anna's longtime lover) and Pale (Robbie's cocaine-snorting, hyperactive restaurant manager brother). In the face of their shared tragedy, the quartet attempts to make sense of their lives and reconsider their own identities and relationships. Anna learns to be independent and self-confident. She begins to pursue her interest in choreography and begins a relationship with Pale, ending her dispassionate relationship with her longtime boyfriend.

== Production history ==
Burn This was commissioned by the Circle Repertory Company. The play opened Off-Broadway on February 19, 1987 at Theatre 890. Directed by Marshall W. Mason, the cast featured Jonathan Hogan, Joan Allen, John Malkovich, and Lou Liberatore. John Lee Beatty won the 1988 Henry Hewes Design Award for Scenic Design for this production. The world premiere was produced by the Center Theatre Group at the Mark Taper Forum in Los Angeles opening January 22, 1987, also directed by Mason.

The play transferred to Broadway at the Plymouth Theatre, opening on October 14, 1987 and closing on October 29, 1988 after 437 performances and seven previews. Again directed by Mason, the original cast appeared in the Broadway production. Over the course of the production, replacements and understudies included Lisa Emery, Scott Glenn, Lonny Price, and Eric Roberts.

The West End production directed by Robert Allan Ackerman opened on November 7, 1990 at the Lyric Theatre. Malkovich and Liberatore were joined by Juliet Stevenson and Michael Simkins. The play had previously played at the Hampstead Theatre prior to transferring to the Lyric Theatre.

The Sydney Theatre Company in Australia presented Burn This at the Wharf Theatre in 1990, starring Heather Mitchell and Richard Roxburgh.

The 2002 Signature Theatre Company revival directed by James Houghton at the Union Square Theatre opened on August 27 in previews, officially on September 19, and closed on December 29, 2002. The cast featured Edward Norton, Catherine Keener, Ty Burrell, and Dallas Roberts. Norton won an Obie Award, and both he and the production received Lucille Lortel Award nominations. Peter Sarsgaard replaced Norton, and Elisabeth Shue replaced Keener on November 20, 2002.

A Broadway revival of Burn This was announced to begin in February 2017 and open on March 6, 2017 at the re-opened Hudson Theatre. Jake Gyllenhaal was to star, with direction by Michael Mayer. On October 21, 2016, it was announced that the production was postponed until the 2017-18 season due to scheduling conflicts with Gyllenhaal.

A revival opened on Broadway at the Hudson Theatre on March 15, 2019 in previews with the official opening on April 16. The cast featured Adam Driver as Pale, Keri Russell as Anna, David Furr as Burton and Brandon Uranowitz as Larry, with direction by Michael Mayer. The production closed on July 14, 2019.

== Casts ==
Character	Los Angeles Premiere (1987)	Off-Broadway / Broadway (1987)	West End (1990)	Off-Broadway Revival (2002)	Broadway Revival (2019)
Pale	John Malkovich	John Malkovich	John Malkovich	Edward Norton	Adam Driver
Anna	Joan Allen	Joan Allen	Juliet Stevenson	Catherine Keener	Keri Russell
Burton	Jonathan Hogan	Jonathan Hogan	Michael Simkins	Ty Burrell	David Furr
Larry	Lou Liberatore	Lou Liberatore	Lou Liberatore	Dallas Roberts	Brandon Uranowitz

Notable replacements

- Pale: Paul Perri (1988), Eric Roberts (1988), Scott Glenn (1988), Peter Sarsgaard (2002)
- Anna: Lisa Emery (1988), Elisabeth Shue (2002)
- Larry: Lonny Price (1988)

== Award and nominations ==
=== Original Broadway Production ===
Year	Award	Category	Nominee	Result
1987	Tony Award	Best Actress in a Play	Joan Allen	Won
1987	Tony Award	Best Featured Actor in a Play	Lou Liberatore	Nominated
1987	Drama Desk Awards	Outstanding Actor in a Play	John Malkovich	Nominated
1987	Drama Desk Awards	Outstanding Featured Actor in a Play	Lou Liberatore	Nominated
1987	Theatre World Award		Eric Roberts	Won

=== 2019 Broadway Revival ===
Year	Award	Category	Nominee	Result
2019	Tony Awards	Best Revival of a Play		Nominated
2019	Tony Awards	Best Actor in a Play	Adam Driver	Nominated
2019	Tony Awards	Best Featured Actor in a Play	Brandon Uranowitz	Nominated
2019	Drama Desk Award	Outstanding Featured Actor in a Play	Brandon Uranowitz	Nominated
2019	Drama League Award	Outstanding Revival of a Broadway / Off-Broadway Play		Nominated
2019	Drama League Award	Distinguished Performance	Adam Driver	Nominated
