= RomCom =

Single by Rob Deniel

from the album Wander Boy
- Language: Tagalog
- Released: August 25, 2023
- Genre: pop
- Length: 3:57
- Label: Viva
- Songwriter: Rob Deniel A. Barrinuevo
- Producers: Jean-Paul Verona; Rob Deniel A. Barrinuevo

Rob Deniel singles chronology
"Sinta" (2023)	"RomCom" (2023)	"Miss Miss" (2023)

Music video
- "RomCom" on YouTube

"RomCom" is a song by the Filipino singer-songwriter Rob Deniel. It was released on August 25, 2023, through Viva Records. It was written by Deniel and produced with Jean-Paul Verona. The song has been described as romantic-styled pop with retro influences and was inspired in part by the American film La La Land. Its accompanying music video features references to several Philippine romantic comedies and includes appearances by Vladia Disuanco, Bini member Maloi Ricalde, Hyacinth Callado, and Sam Benwick.

"RomCom" peaked at number twenty-one on Billboard's now defunct Philippines Songs chart. It also reached at number forty-two on the Billboard Philippines Hot 100 and number thirty-four on the Top Philippine Songs chart.

== Background and release ==
Deniel released the single "Sinta" (transl. My Love), which has been noted for its resemblance to the classic Original Pilipino Music style known as "Manila sound." He had transitioned from recording with GarageBand on his iPhone to working in a professional studio.

After the release of "Sinta," he released new single titled "RomCom" on August 25, 2023.

== Composition ==
"RomCom" is three minutes and fifty-seven seconds long. It was written by Rob Deniel and produced with Jean-Paul Verona. The song has been described as romantic styled pop with retro influences consistent with Deniel's established musical aesthetic. In an interview during the single's launch on August 27, Rob stated that the song explores the experience of falling in love for the first time. He cited the 2016 American musical romantic comedy-drama film La La Land as a primary inspiration, noting that unlike the movie, the song concludes with a happy ending. Deniel also mentioned that he drafted four versions of the song ranging from slow to fast before settling on the mid-tempo arrangement that he felt best conveyed its intended essence.

== Music video ==
The music video incorporates references to notable Filipino romantic comedies, including Kita Kita (transl. I See You), A Very Special Love, Diary ng Panget (lit. 'Diary of an Ugly'), and Flames: The Movie. Deniel appears alongside Vladia Disuanco, Bini member Maloi Ricalde, Hyacinth Callado, and Sam Benwich in recreations of notable scenes from these films. Segments include the ramen scene from Kita Kita, the door-locking misunderstanding from A Very Special Love, the dynamic between Cross and Eya from Diary ng Panget, and the "you've got something on your face" moment from Flames: The Movie. The latter also references actors Jolina Magdangal, Marvin Agustin, Claudine Barretto, Rico Yan, Empoy Marquez, Alessandra De Rossi, Sarah Geronimo, John Lloyd Cruz, James Reid and Nadine Lustre (JaDine). Agustin and Magdangal who are also mentioned in the song's lyrics.

== Charts ==
Chart (2024)	Peak position
Philippines (Billboard)	21
Philippines Hot 100 (Billboard Philippines)	42
Philippines Top Songs (Billboard Philippines)	34

== Listicles ==
Name of publisher, year listed, name of listicle, and placement
Publisher	Year	Listicle	Placement	Ref.
Billboard Philippines	2025	8 Filipino Love Songs that Soundtrack your Favorite Love Teams – Staff Picks	Placed	

== Credits ==
Credits are adapted from Tidal.

- Rob Deniel – vocal, composer, lyricist
- Jean-Paul Verona – producer
