= Manhattan Romance =

2014 film by Tom O'Brien

- Release poster
- Directed by: Tom O'Brien
- Written by: Tom O'Brien
- Produced by: Mike Harrop; Tom O'Brien
- Starring: Tom O'Brien; Katherine Waterston; Caitlin FitzGerald; Gaby Hoffmann
- Cinematography: Scott Miller
- Edited by: Nick Houy
- Production company: Beacon Films
- Distributed by: Level 33 Entertainment
- Release dates: October 14, 2014 (New Orleans Film Festival); October 2, 2015 (United States)
- Running time: 94 minutes
- Country: United States
- Language: English

Manhattan Romance is a 2014 American romantic comedy-drama film written and directed by Tom O'Brien, who stars alongside Katherine Waterston, Caitlin FitzGerald, and Gaby Hoffmann.

== Plot ==
Filmmaker Danny is working on a documentary about relationships, consisting of interviews with various acquaintances and strangers about their love lives.

Theresa is one of them, who has only open relationships. She is a flirty neo-hippie, who mystifies Danny. She will pause in her interaction with him to have intense and freeing connections with others. In a free dance group, later in a café...at one moment kissing provocatively in her bedroom, then insisting they just sleep.

Right after Danny videos her talking about her poly-amorous lifestyle, he offers to give her a massage which progresses to her removing her top. He perceives it as coquettishness, so has Danny daydreaming of romping in her bedroom, but she continues to try to keep their interaction non-sexual.

Between these frustrating encounters, he sees his friend Carla. He tells her about his unreciprocated desire for Theresa, she shows mild sympathy in response, unbelieving that he puts up with it. Danny also films Carla and Emmy discussing their lesbian romance. During the interview he discovers his friend had broken up with a Brad to be with her, making him realise she hasn't always been gay.

At a wedding reception, Danny inevitably gets discussed by his older relatives. As he didn't bring a date and isn't in a relationship, one is convinced he's in the closet. Danny and his mom's boyfriend smoke pot and he is given unwanted details of her sex life.

Carla shows up at Danny's, blue about things with Emmy, and they smoke pot and drink copious amounts of wine. They later prowl about town, entering a pub where she says that Emmy wouldn't explain about a connection, so she fears she's cheating.

Danny explains that his relationships with women were either purely sexual or platonic at college. Carla asserts he continues to be that way to avoid intimacy. As she has been living with Emmy, he puts her up for the night. She insists they share his bed.

Time passes, and Danny bumps into Emmy, who's surprised he and Carla haven't spent time together. She invites him to an election party the next day. That night, he visits Theresa who's hanging with the shirtless dance group organizer. Uncomfortable, he shrugs off one of her full body hugs.

At the election night party, when Danny sees Carla he takes her out back. He says he loves her and he kisses her, at first resisting, but then kisses back. He tells her he finally doesn't feel lonely thanks to her and tries to get her to admit she's unhappy. Emmy finds them, and senses something. She lightly asks Danny to give a kiss to Carla, and he goes.

Emmy confronts Carla who ultimately breaks it off with her. We cut to Danny traveling upstate to discuss the premiere in the film festival. He defends his leaving the film open-ended. Afterwards, Carla approaches him, praising the film. They go for a walk, searching for a café, and we watch them walk off into the distance.

== Cast ==
- Tom O'Brien as Daniel "Danny"
- Katherine Waterston as Carla
- Caitlin FitzGerald as Theresa
- Gaby Hoffmann as Emmy
- Zach Grenier as Trevor
- Louis Cancelmi as Jarrod
- Ean Sheehy as Hal
- Paul O'Brien as Uncle Bob
- Jessie Barr as Gayle

== Release ==
Manhattan Romance had its world premiere at the New Orleans Film Festival on October 14, 2014. In June 2015, Level 33 Entertainment acquired U.S. and Canadian distribution rights to the film. It was released in the United States in select theaters and on iTunes on October 2, 2015.
