= Rich Sommer =

American actor (born 1978)

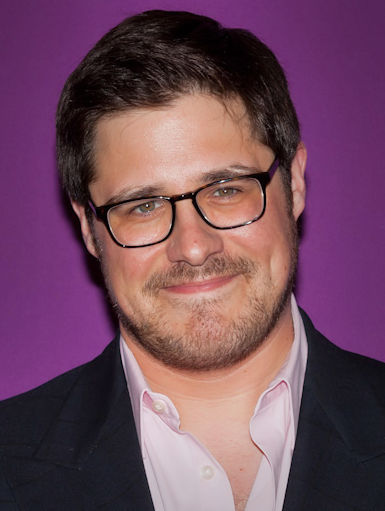
- Sommer in 2012
- Born: February 2, 1978 (age 48); Toledo, Ohio, U.S.
- Education: Concordia College (BA); Case Western Reserve University (MFA)
- Occupation: Actor
- Years active: 2004–present
- Spouse: Virginia Donohoe (m. 2005)
- Children: 2

Richard Sommer (born February 2, 1978) is an American actor, known for his portrayal of Harry Crane on the AMC drama series Mad Men (2007–2015) for which he earned two Screen Actors Guild Awards along with the ensemble cast. He is also known for his roles in the comedy-drama films The Devil Wears Prada (2006), Celeste and Jesse Forever (2012), The Giant Mechanical Man (2012), Hello, My Name Is Doris (2015), and BlackBerry (2023) as well as voicing Henry in the 2016 video game Firewatch. He guest starred in a number of Elementary episodes. More recently, he portrayed Detective Dean Riley in The CW crime drama television series In the Dark (2019).

== Early life and education ==
Sommer was born in Toledo, Ohio, and raised in Stillwater, Minnesota, where he was educated at Oak-Land Junior High School and Stillwater Area High School. He then went on to attend Concordia College in Moorhead, Minnesota, where he majored in theater and sang in The Concordia Choir. Sommer studied improvisation at the Brave New Workshop in Minneapolis, and started an improv group, the Slush Puppies, in Moorhead. In 2004, he received his Master of Fine Arts in acting from Case Western Reserve University in Cleveland, Ohio. Sommer returned to the school in 2006 to teach icebreakers to law students, and again in 2008 to do an improv workshop with undergraduate theatre students.

== Career ==
Sommer's most notable film role to date is as Anne Hathaway's friend Doug in the 2006 film The Devil Wears Prada. He has appeared in commercials for companies such as Bud Light, Dairy Queen, Nextel, and Sprint.

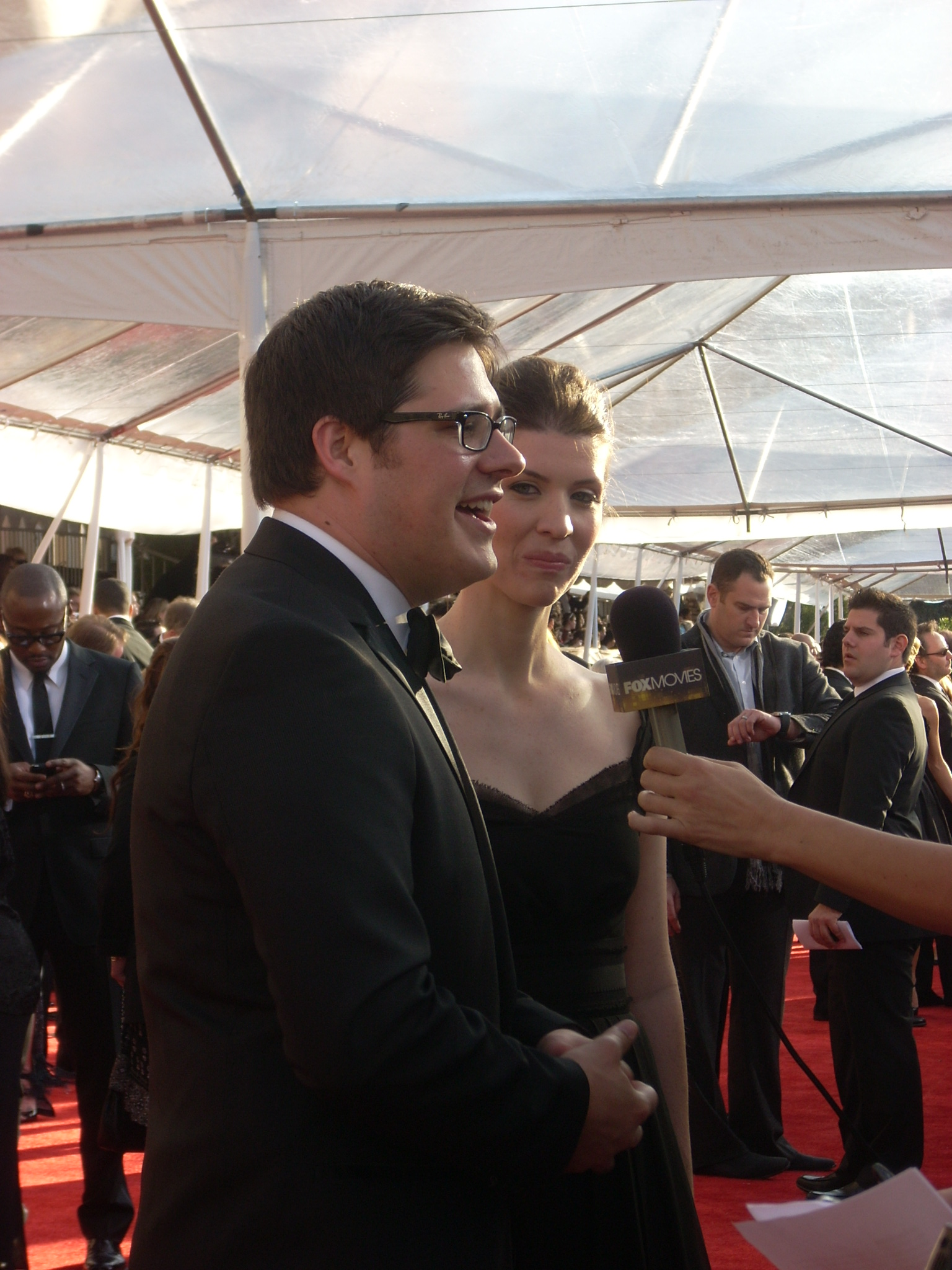
Sommer at the 15th Screen Actors Guild Awards in 2009

From 2007 until its ending in 2015, Sommer maintained a regular role on AMC's period drama series Mad Men as Harry Crane, a media buyer who becomes head of the television department in a 1960s Madison Avenue ad agency. In 2008, Sommer appeared as a guest star in two episodes of NBC's mockumentary sitcom series The Office, portraying the role of Alex. In 2010, he played Jimmy Wilson in a guest appearance on Ugly Betty.

In 2011, Sommer guest starred in two episodes of The CW's drama-thriller series Nikita as electrical engineer and CIA consultant Malcolm Mitchell. The following year, he co-starred with Bob Odenkirk and Jenna Fischer in the romantic comedy film The Giant Mechanical Man. In May 2012, he began performances of the Roundabout Theatre Company's production of Harvey on Broadway, co-starring alongside Jim Parsons. Also that same year, he guest starred in NBC's police procedural series Law & Order: Special Victims Unit as Boyd Hartwell.

On March 1, 2014, it was reported that Sommer had been cast in the CBS pilot Good Session; however, the network later declined to pick up the project to series. In November 2014, Sommer reprised his role as Harlan Emple in an episode of CBS's procedural drama series Elementary, after guest starring as the character in an episode the previous year. From February 2 to March 13, 2016, Sommer starred in the Off-Broadway revival of Sam Shepard's play Buried Child, with Ed Harris and Amy Madigan. That same year, he also co-starred in Rob Reiner's biopic LBJ as Press Secretary Pierre Salinger, alongside Woody Harrelson in the title role.

In 2018, Sommer appeared in the horror mystery film Summer of 84, opposite Graham Verchere, Judah Lewis and Tiera Skovbye.

Sommer is a fan favorite on the podcast Never Not Funny, hosted by comedian and podcasting pioneer Jimmy Pardo. In 2020, he became a recurring guest on the streaming version of The George Lucas Talk Show, appearing as himself and as his own fictional roommate, Steven Charleston.

== Personal life ==
Sommer lives in Los Angeles with his wife, Virginia Donohoe, whom he married on August 13, 2005. They have two children.

Sommer is a fan of tabletop games and hosted a podcast about them called CARDBOARD!

== Filmography ==
=== Film ===
Year	Title	Role	Notes
2006	The Devil Wears Prada	Doug	
2010	Radio Free Albemuth	FBI Agent #2	
2012	Celeste and Jesse Forever	Max	
2012	The Giant Mechanical Man	Brian	
2012	Fairhaven	Sam	
2015	Hello, My Name Is Doris	Robert	
2015	My Name Is David	His GRE Student	
2016	LBJ	Pierre Salinger	
2017	Girlfriend's Day	Buddy	
2017	A Crooked Somebody	Michael Vaughn	
2018	Summer of 84	Wayne Mackey	
2018	A Futile and Stupid Gesture	Harry Crane	
2019	Code Geass: Lelouch of the Re;surrection	Shesthaal (voice)	English dub
2021	King Richard	Patrick Dougherty	
2023	Fair Play	Paul	
2023	BlackBerry	Paul Stannos	
2026	Tony	Pierre Bourdain	
2026	Misty Green	Brad	
2026	Fresh Meat	Health Inspector	Segment: "Sate the Screen"

=== Television ===
Year	Title	Role	Notes
2007	Law & Order	Mike Scholl	1 episode
2007–2015	Mad Men	Harry Crane	Main role, 92 episodes
2008	Without a Trace	Will Herring	1 episode
2008	The Office	Alex	Episodes: "Weight Loss", "Customer Survey"
2009	Law & Order	Zach Marshall	1 episode
2009	The Storm	Dr. Jack Hoffman	2 episodes
2010	Ugly Betty	Jimmy Wilson	Episode: "Fire and Nice"
2010	Burn Notice	Winston	1 episode
2011	CSI: Crime Scene Investigation	Scott Horan	Episode: "Man Up"
2011	Curb Your Enthusiasm	Veterinarian	Episode: "Vow of Silence"
2011	Nikita	Malcolm Mitchell	2 episodes
2012	Law & Order: Special Victims Unit	Boyd Hartwell	1 episode
2013–2018	Elementary	Harlan Emple	3 episodes
2014	The League	Freddie Mandino	1 episode
2015	The Simpsons	Young Man (voice)	Episode: "My Fare Lady"
2015	Comedy Bang! Bang!	Agent Bill Ritz	1 episode
2015	Wet Hot American Summer: First Day of Camp	Graham	Miniseries, 6 episodes
2015	Playing House	Brian	1 episode
2015–2017	Regular Show	Various voices	7 episodes
2016	Last Week Tonight with John Oliver	Apple Engineer	1 episode
2016	Grey's Anatomy	Noah	1 episode
2016	Filthy Preppy Teens	Melville	1 episode
2016	Adventure Time	Grand Prix (voice)	1 episode
2016	TripTank	Man / Gary (voice)	1 episode
2016	Masters of Sex	Dale Connelly	2 episodes
2016–2017	Love	Dustin	Recurring role, 5 episodes
2016–2020	Elena of Avalor	Captain Daniel Turner (voice)	Recurring role, 9 episodes
2017	Wet Hot American Summer: Ten Years Later	Graham	Miniseries, 6 episodes
2017–2019	GLOW	Mark Eagan	Recurring role, 12 episodes
2018	Adam Ruins Everything	(voice)	3 episodes
2018	Champaign ILL	Zack Chevalier	1 episode
2019	FBI	Dr. Ed Praeger	1 episode
2019–2020	In the Dark	Detective Dean Riley	Main role, 26 episodes
2020	Run	Laurence Richardson	Recurring role, 5 episodes
2020	F Is for Family	Various voices	1 episode
2020–2022	Close Enough	Keith Nash (voice)	3 episodes
2020–2023	The George Lucas Talk Show	Himself / Steven Charleston	4 episodes
2022	The Dropout	Kevin Hunter	Miniseries, 1 episode
2022–2023	Minx	Lenny	3 episodes
2022–2024	Alice's Wonderland Bakery	Captain Dodo / various (voice)	Recurring role, 14 episodes
2022–2024	Firebuds	Mr. Wexell (voice)	Recurring role, 5 episodes
2023	White House Plumbers	Egil Krogh	Miniseries, 1 episode
2024	Clipped	Seth Burton	Miniseries, 4 episodes
2024	Mr. Throwback	Dr. Rich	Recurring role, 5 episodes
2025	Big City Greens	Bank Boss (voice)	1 episode
2026	R.J. Decker	Bryce	1 episode
2026	9-1-1	LAFD Captain Thorne	1 episode

=== Theatre ===
Year	Title	Role	Notes
2012	Harvey	Duane Wilson	Studio 54
2013	The Unavoidable Disappearance of Tom Durnin	Chris Wyatt	Laura Pels Theatre
2016	Buried Child	Bradley	Jewel Box Theatre

=== Video games ===
Year	Title	Role
2011	L.A. Noire	John Cunningham
2016	Firewatch	Henry (voice)
2020	Half-Life: Alyx	Larry / Drone / Combine Soldier (voice)
2020	Dota 2	Aghanim (voice)

== Awards and nominations ==
Year	Association	Category	Work	Result
2007	Satellite Awards	Best Cast – Television Series	Mad Men	Won
2007	Screen Actors Guild Awards	Outstanding Performance by an Ensemble in a Drama Series	Mad Men	Nominated
2008	Screen Actors Guild Awards	Outstanding Performance by an Ensemble in a Drama Series	Mad Men	Won
2009	Screen Actors Guild Awards	Outstanding Performance by an Ensemble in a Drama Series	Mad Men	Won
2010	Screen Actors Guild Awards	Outstanding Performance by an Ensemble in a Drama Series	Mad Men	Nominated
2012	Screen Actors Guild Awards	Outstanding Performance by an Ensemble in a Drama Series	Mad Men	Nominated
2015	Screen Actors Guild Awards	Outstanding Performance by an Ensemble in a Drama Series	Mad Men	Nominated
2016	The Game Awards	Best Performance	Firewatch	Nominated
2017	New York Game Awards	Great White Way Award for Best Acting in a Game	Firewatch	Won
