= Fairhaven (film) =

- Theatrical release poster
- Directed by: Tom O'Brien
- Screenplay by: Tom O'Brien
- Story by: Tom O'Brien; Chris Messina
- Produced by: Massoumeh Emami; Tom O'Brien
- Starring: Sarah Paulson; Chris Messina; Rich Sommer; Alexie Gilmore; Natalie Gold; Maryann Plunkett
- Cinematography: Peter Simonite
- Edited by: Nick Houy
- Music by: Blow Up Hollywood
- Production company: Beacon Films
- Distributed by: Starz Digital
- Release dates: April 20, 2012 (Tribeca Film Festival); January 11, 2013 (United States)
- Running time: 81 minutes
- Country: United States
- Language: English

Fairhaven is a 2012 American comedy film written and directed by Tom O'Brien. The film stars Sarah Paulson, Chris Messina, Rich Sommer, Alexie Gilmore, Natalie Gold and Maryann Plunkett. The film was released on January 11, 2013, by Starz Digital.

== Plot ==
A man returns to his Massachusetts coastal hometown for the funeral of his father and a reconnection with two old friends.

== Cast ==
- Sarah Paulson as Kate
- Chris Messina as Dave
- Rich Sommer as Sam
- Alexie Gilmore as Angela
- Natalie Gold as Jill
- Maryann Plunkett as Maddy
- Tom O'Brien as Jon
- Georgia Lyman as Sara
- Paul O'Brien as Gary
- Tim Haber as Chet
- Phyllis Kay as Dave's Mom
- Alicia Racine as Stacy

== Release ==
The film premiered at the Tribeca Film Festival on April 20, 2012. The film was released on January 11, 2013, by Starz Digital.

== Critical reception ==
The Hollywood Reporter said in its review, "Writer-director-actor Tom O’Brien’s feature debut, Fairhaven, is a small-scale but warmly satisfying drama about a trio of male friends from a sleepy Southeastern Massachusetts fishing village, reunited in their thirties for a funeral."
