= Chris Messina =

American actor (born 1974)

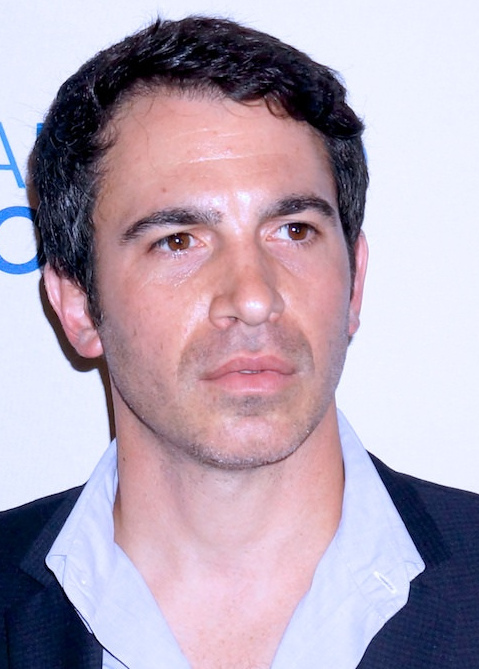
- Messina in 2014
- Born: August 11, 1974 (age 52); Northport, New York, U.S.
- Occupations: Actor; director; writer; producer
- Years active: 1995–present
- Spouses: Rosemarie DeWitt (m. 1995; div. 2006): Jennifer Todd
- Children: 2
- Relatives: Suzanne Todd (sister-in-law)

Christian Messina (born August 11, 1974) is an American actor. He is best known for starring as Danny Castellano in the series The Mindy Project (2012–2017), which earned him two nominations for the Critics' Choice Television Award for Best Actor in a Comedy Series.

Messina's film appearances include Vicky Cristina Barcelona (2008), Julie & Julia (2009), Devil (2010), Argo (2012), Ruby Sparks (2012), Celeste and Jesse Forever (2012), Cake (2014), Birds of Prey (2020), I Care a Lot (2020), Call Jane (2022), Air (2023), and The Boogeyman (2023). Messina wrote, executive produced, and starred in the comedy film Fairhaven (2012). He also directed and starred in the drama film Alex of Venice (2014).

On television, Messina appeared as Ted Fairwell in the HBO drama series Six Feet Under (2005), Chris Sanchez in the Audience Network legal thriller series Damages (2011–2012), Reese Lansing in the HBO political drama series The Newsroom (2012–2014), Richard Willis in the HBO miniseries Sharp Objects (2018), Nick Haas in the USA Network crime drama series The Sinner (2020), Angelo Lano in the Starz political miniseries Gaslit (2022), and as Nathan Bartlett in the Peacock comedy thriller Based on a True Story (2023).

== Early life and education ==
Messina was raised in Northport, New York, on Long Island, where he studied theater in high school. He attended Marymount Manhattan College, but dropped out after one semester.

== Career ==
He studied acting privately with teachers around Manhattan, and started his career as an off-Broadway actor. He has appeared in episodes of the television series Law & Order, Third Watch, and Medium. He had a recurring role in the fifth and final season of the HBO drama series Six Feet Under as Ted Fairwell. His film credits include Rounders, The Siege, You've Got Mail, and Towelhead.

He starred in an HBO pilot Anatomy of Hope, directed by J. J. Abrams. Simon Callow also starred, but the pilot was not picked up to series. In October 2007, Daily Variety named him as one of ten actors to watch. He starred in Devil, under the direction of John Erick Dowdle and Drew Dowdle, for producer M. Night Shyamalan and Universal Pictures. In April 2010, Monogamy, directed by Dana Adam Shapiro and starring Messina and Rashida Jones, premiered at the Tribeca Film Festival, where the film won the jury prize for Best New York Narrative.

Messina joined the cast of Damages for its fourth and fifth seasons. He played a recurring character on HBO's The Newsroom. Messina was a series regular on the Fox/Hulu sitcom The Mindy Project, playing Dr. Danny Castellano, until his character was eventually phased out in seasons 4 and 5. He made his return in three episodes, including the season and series finale, in season 6.

In 2014, Messina played the role of a cheating spouse in the music video for Sam Smith's "I'm Not the Only One". That same year, he directed the independent drama, Alex of Venice, starring Mary Elizabeth Winstead, Don Johnson and Matthew Del Negro. He co-starred in Ben Affleck's crime drama Live by Night, which was released in December 2016. In 2018, Messina starred in a leading role alongside Amy Adams in the HBO series Sharp Objects.

In 2020, Chris Messina starred as mob killer Victor Zsasz in Birds of Prey. When asked how he felt about playing a twisted character, Messina replied, "I've played too many nice guys in my career. So it was like just really a lot of fun to let loose."

In 2021, Messina portrayed attorney Dean Ericson in the black comedy thriller I Care a Lot.

== Personal life ==
He was married to actress Rosemarie DeWitt for 12 years, divorcing in 2006.

Messina and his second wife Jennifer Todd have two sons.

== Filmography ==
=== Film ===
Year	Title	Role	Notes
1995	When Dating Turns Dangerous	Zach	Educational film
1998	Rounders	Higgins	
1998	The Siege	Corporal	
1998	You've Got Mail	Fox Salesperson	
2000	Turn It Up	Baz	
2001	Ordinary Sinner	Silvio	
2005	Road	Larry	
2005	Bittersweet Place	Seymour	
2005	The Crooked Corner	Nephew	
2006	Ira & Abby	Ira Black	
2007	Security	Zelly	Short film
2007	Towelhead	Barry	
2008	Humboldt County	Max	
2008	Made of Honor	Dennis	
2008	Vicky Cristina Barcelona	Doug	
2009	Brief Interviews with Hideous Men	Subject #19	
2009	Away We Go	Tom Garnett	
2009	Julie & Julia	Eric Powell	
2010	Greenberg	Philip Greenberg	
2010	Monogamy	Theo	
2010	Devil	Detective Bowden	
2010	An Invisible Sign	Ben Smith	
2011	Like Crazy	Mike Appletree	
2011	The Trouble with Bliss	NJ	
2012	Celeste and Jesse Forever	Paul	
2012	28 Hotel Rooms	Man	Also executive producer
2012	The Giant Mechanical Man	Tim	
2012	Fairhaven	Dave	Also writer and executive producer
2012	Denise	Brad	Short film
2012	Ruby Sparks	Harry Weir-Fields	
2012	Argo	Malinov	
2013	Palo Alto	Mitch	
2014	The Oven	Narrator	Short film
2014	Showing Up	Himself	Documentary
2014	Alex of Venice	George	Also director
2014	Manglehorn	Jacob	
2014	Cake	Jason	
2015	Digging for Fire	Billy T	
2016	Ordinary World	Jake	
2016	Live by Night	Dion Bartolo	
2016	The Sweet Life	Kenny	
2017	Blame	Jeremy Woods	
2019	The True Adventures of Wolfboy	Denny	
2020	Birds of Prey	Victor Zsasz	
2020	She Dies Tomorrow	Jason	
2020	Love Is Love Is Love	Jack	
2020	I Care a Lot	Dean Ericson	
2020	The Secrets We Keep	Lewis Reid	
2022	Call Jane	Will	
2022	The Aviary	Seth	
2022	Dreamin' Wild	Matt Sullivan	
2023	Air	David Falk	
2023	The Boogeyman	Will Harper	
2023	I.S.S.	Gordon Barrett	
2024	Juror #2	Eric Resnik	
2026	Pressure	Irving P. Krick	Post-production
TBA	Lear Rex	Duke of Cornwall	Post-production
TBA	Tumor		Post-production

=== Television ===
Year	Title	Role	Notes
1995	Law & Order	Tommy Bell	Episode: "Rebels"
1996	Law & Order	Kevin Turner	Episode: "Homesick"
2000	Third Watch	Charlie	Episode: "History"
2001	Big Apple	Ricky	Episode: "A Ministering Angel"
2003	Law & Order	Don Cushman	Episode: "Suicide Box"
2005	Six Feet Under	Ted Fairwell	6 episodes
2007	Medium	Casey Edward Frank	Episode: "The Whole Truth"
2011–2012	Damages	Chris Sanchez	16 episodes
2012–2014	The Newsroom	Reese Lansing	12 episodes
2012–2017	The Mindy Project	Dr. Daniel Castellano	Main role (season 1–4); Recurring (season 5–6): 90 episodes
2018	Sharp Objects	Detective Richard Willis	Main role: 8 episodes
2019	Robot Chicken	Various voices	Episode: "Boogie Bardstown in: No Need, I Have Coupons"
2020	The Sinner	Nick Haas	Main role (season 3): 5 episodes
2022	Gaslit	Agent Angelo Lano	Recurring role: 4 episodes
2023–2024	Based on a True Story	Nathan Bartlett	Main role, Executive Producer (S2)
TBA	The White Lotus †	TBA	Season 4

=== Stage ===
Year	Title	Role	Run	Theater and production	Notes
1997	The American Clock	Sidney Margolies/ Charley/Ralph/ Walter	October 19, 1997 – unknown	Signature Theatre Company at The Peter Norton Space	
1999	The Group	Director	August 9–20, 1999	All Seasons Theatre Group at The Ensemble Studio Theatre	
1999	Refuge	Nat	November 18 – December 12, 1999	Playwright's Horizon Studio Theater	
2000	The Hologram Theory	Joe Buck	March 27 – April 9, 2000	McGinn/Cazale Theater	
2000	The Light Outside	Frankie	November 5 – December 16, 2000	The Flea Theater	
2001	Tamicanfly	C.J.	January 17 – February 4, 2001	McGinn/Cazale Theater	
2001	Blur	Joey D'Amico	May 17 – June 24, 2001	Manhattan Theater Club at New York City Center Stage II	
2001–02	Good Thing	Bobby	December 16, 2001 – January 6, 2002	The New Group at The Theater at St. Clements Church	
2002	This Thing of Darkness	Abbey/Reef	May 30 – June 16, 2002	Atlantic Theater Company at Linda Gross Theater	
2002	Faster	Skram	September 8 – October 13, 2002	Rattlestick Theater	
2002–03	Far Away	Todd	November 11, 2002 – January 18, 2003	New York Theatre Workshop	
2003	Salome by Oscar Wilde: The Reading	The Young Syrian (Captain of the Guard)	April 30 – June 12, 2003	Ethel Barrymore Theater	Broadway debut for Messina
2003	St. Scarlet	Director	June 13 – July 12, 2003	Ontological Theater at St. Mark's Church	
2004	Motel Blues: Management	Mike	March 25 – April 11, 2004	Apartment 929 at Greenwich Street Theatre	
2004	The Seagull	Treplev	May 24–29, 2004	White Heron Theater company at Second Stage Theatre	
2004	The Cherry Orchard	Trofimov	August 11–22, 2004	Williamstown Theatre Festival at Adams Memorial Theater	
2004	Late Night, Early Morning		October 21–31, 2004	2004 Tribeca Theatre Festival	

== Awards and nominations ==
Year	Award	Category	Work	Result
2011	CinEuphoria Award	Best Supporting Actor - International Competition	Away We Go	Won
2012	Awards Circuit Community Award	Best Cast Ensemble	Argo	Nominated
2012	Detroit Film Critics Society Award	Best Ensemble	Argo	Nominated
2012	San Diego Film Critics Society Award	Best Ensemble Performance	Argo	Nominated
2012	Phoenix Film Critics Society Award	Best Ensemble Acting	Argo	Nominated
2012	Washington D.C. Area Film Critics Association Award	Best Ensemble	Argo	Nominated
2013	Central Ohio Film Critics Association Award	Best Ensemble	Argo	Nominated
2013	Palm Springs International Film Festival	Best Ensemble	Argo	Won
2013	Critics' Choice Movie Award	Best Acting Ensemble	Argo	Nominated
2013	Screen Actors Guild Award	Outstanding Performance by a Cast in a Motion Picture	Argo	Won
2014	Critics' Choice Television Award	Best Actor in a Comedy Series	The Mindy Project	Nominated
2014	Seattle International Film Festival	New American Cinema Award	Alex of Venice	Nominated
2015	Critics' Choice Television Award	Best Actor in a Comedy Series	The Mindy Project	Nominated
