= List of Israeli films of 2001 =

A list of films produced by the Israeli film industry in 2001.

== 2001 releases ==
| Premiere | Title | Director | Cast | Genre | Notes | Ref |
|---|---|---|---|---|---|---|
| Date unknown | Caravan 841 | Zion Rubin | | Drama, coming-of-age | Best Script at the Jerusalem International Film Festival, 2001 and Honorable Mention at The San Francisco International Film Festival, 2001 | |
| 22 February | Mars Turkey (Hebrew: מרס תורכי) | Oded Davidoff | Alon Aboutboul, Yael Hadar, Gal Zaid, Dalit Kahan | Comedy, Crime, Drama, Thriller | | |
| 8 March | Lemon Popsicle 9: The Party Goes On (Hebrew: אסקימו לימון 9: החגיגה נמשכת) | Tzvi Shissel | Nicky Goldstein, Ido Lev, Elad Stefansky | Comedy, Romance | | |
| 10 May | Desperado Square (Hebrew: כיכר החלומות) | Benny Toraty | Joseph Shiloach, Yona Elian, Mohammad Bakri and Uri Gavriel | Drama | | |
| 17 May | Late Marriage (Hebrew: חתונה מאוחרת) | Dover Kosashvili | Lior Ashkenazi, Ronit Elkabetz, Moni Moshonov and Lili Kosashvili | Comedy, Drama, Romance | Israeli-French co-production; Screened at the 2001 Cannes Film Festival | |
| 14 July | Made in Israel | Ari Folman | Menashe Noy, Jenya Dodina | Drama | | |
| 18 July | Ingil (Hebrew: אנג'ל) | Arnon Zadok | Idan Bardach, Omer Barnea, Jonathan Cherchi and Oshri Cohen | Drama | | |
| 16 August | Yellow Asphalt (Hebrew: אספלט צהוב) | Danny Verete | Sami Samir, Tatjana Blacher | Drama | | |
| 29 August | Eden (Hebrew: עדן) | Amos Gitai | Samantha Morton, Thomas Jane | Drama, Romance, War | Israeli-French-Italian co-production | |
| 1 September | Girafot (Hebrew: ג'ירפות lit. "Giraffes") | Tzahi Grad | Meital Dohan, Liat Glick, Tinkerbell | Action, Drama | | |
| 28 October | A Five Minutes Walk (Hebrew: חמש דקות בהליכה) | Itai Lev | Alon Aboutboul, Sharon Alexander, Dvir Benedek | Crime, Drama | | |

== Awards ==
| === Ophir Award === | === Wolgin Award === |

== Notable deaths ==
- September 8 – Dudu Dotan, Israeli entertainer and actor (b. 1949)

== See also ==
- 2001 in Israel
