= 2001 in Israel =

- Decades: 1980s; 1990s; 2000s; 2010s; 2020s
- See also: History of Israel; Timeline of Israeli history; List of years in Israel

Events in the year 2001 in Israel.

== Incumbents ==
- President of Israel – Moshe Katsav
- Prime Minister of Israel – Ehud Barak (Israeli Labor Party) until March 7, Ariel Sharon (Likud)
- President of the Supreme Court – Aharon Barak
- Chief of General Staff – Shaul Mofaz
- Government of Israel – 28th Government of Israel until March 7, 29th Government of Israel
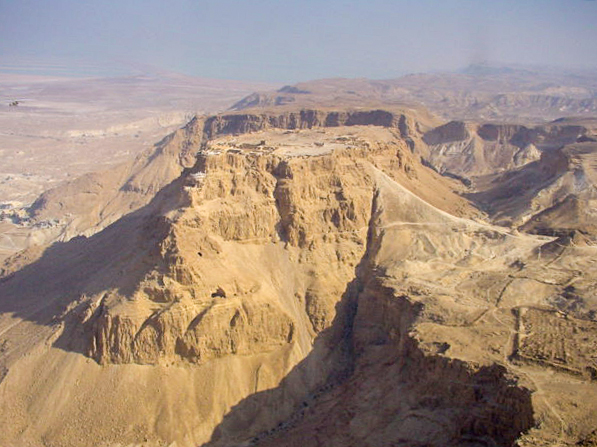
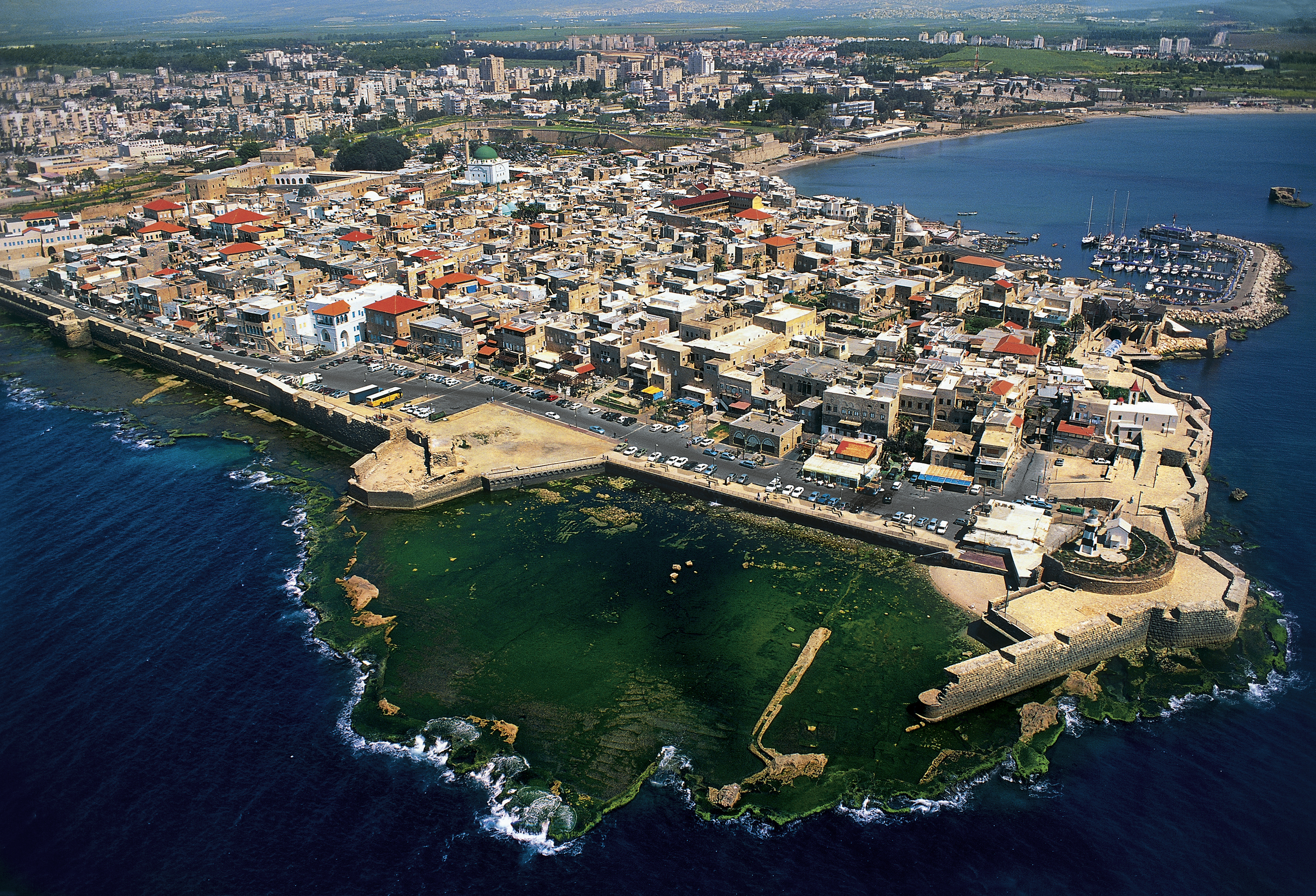
Masada and the Old City of Acre, Israel are designated by UNESCO as World Heritage Sites
- February 6 – Likud Party leader Ariel Sharon wins the Israeli prime ministerial election which are held following the resignation of Ehud Barak.
- March 7 – Ariel Sharon presents his cabinet for a Knesset "Vote of Confidence". The 29th Government is approved that day and the members were sworn in.
- March 22 – Israeli former general, defense minister and transportation minister Yitzhak Mordechai is convicted of harassing and sexually assaulting two women, and receives an 18-month suspended sentence. Several days after his conviction, he resigned from the Knesset.
- May 24 – The Versailles wedding hall disaster in Jerusalem kills 23 and injures over 200 in Israel's second worst civil disaster to the 2021 Meron crowd crush.
- July 16–23 – The 2001 Maccabiah Games are held.
- October 4 – Siberia Airlines Flight 1812 crashes over the Black Sea en route from Tel Aviv to Novosibirsk, Russia; 78 are killed, 51 of them are Israeli citizens, mostly immigrants from the former Soviet Union.
- November – The Israeli developed and produced assault rifle Tavor TAR-21 was first introduced to the IDF forces.
- December 13 – Masada and the Old City of Acre, Israel are designated UNESCO World Heritage Sites.
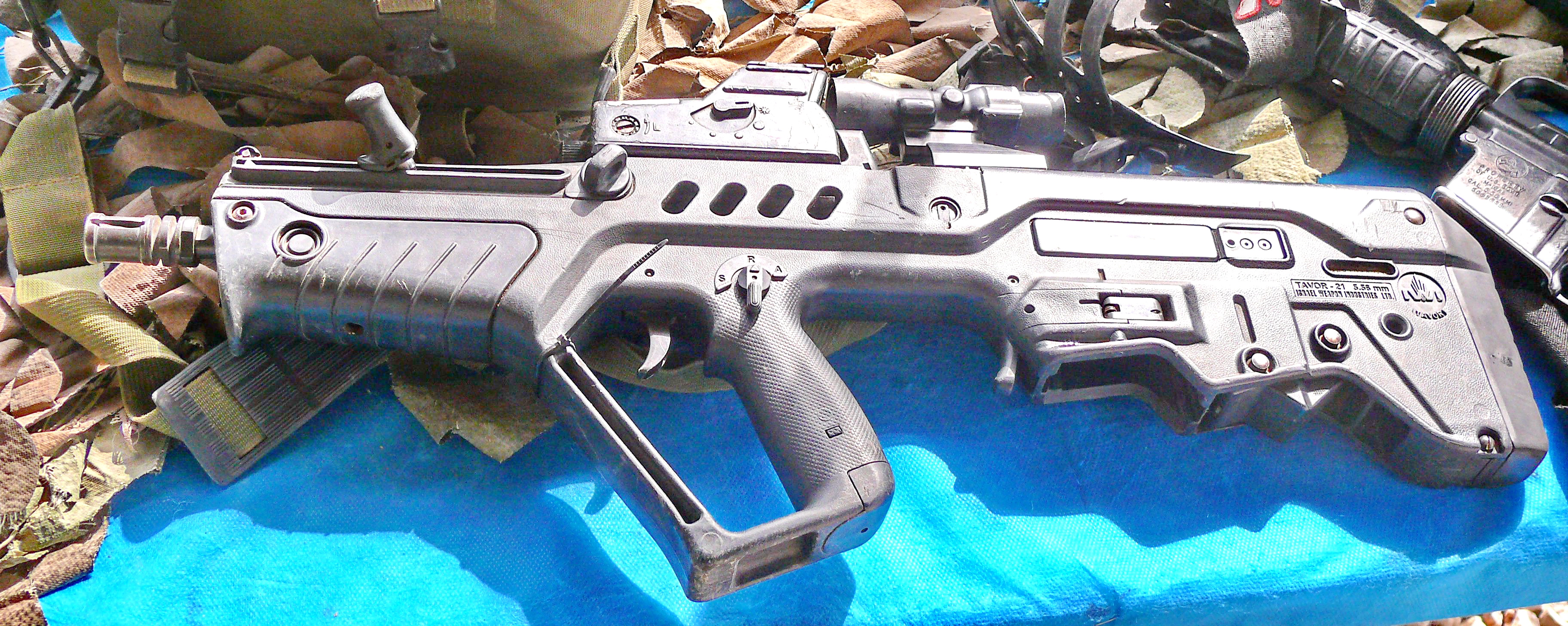
The Israeli developed and produced assault rifle Tavor TAR-21 was first introduced to the IDF forces.

=== Israeli–Palestinian conflict ===
The most prominent events related to the Israeli–Palestinian conflict which occurred during 2001 include:

- January 21–27 – Taba Summit: Peace talks between Israel and the Palestinian Authority aimed at reaching the "final status" of negotiations. Ehud Barak temporarily withdraws from negotiations during the Israeli elections, subsequently Ariel Sharon refuses to continue negotiating in the face of the newly erupted violence.
- July 19 – Kach members fire on a car in the West Bank killing three Palestinians.

Notable Palestinian militant operations against Israeli targets

The most prominent Palestinian militant acts and operations committed against Israeli targets during 2001 include:

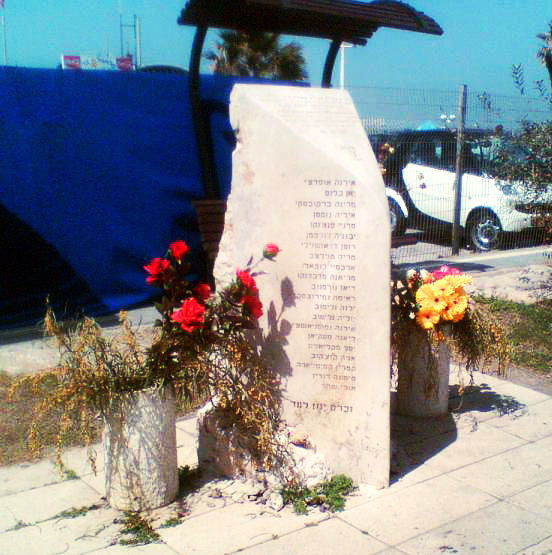
Memorial for the victims of the Dolphinarium discothèque suicide bombing

- January 1 – Netanya center bombing: 54 people are injured when a car, containing 44 pounds of explosives, explodes near a bus stop in Netanya's shopping district. Hamas claimed responsibility.
- January 17 – Murder of Ofir Rahum: A 24-year-old female Bir Nabala Palestinian activist Amana Jawad Mona, through an online chat claiming to be an American tourist and seduces 16-year-old Israeli high school student Ofir Rahum, arranged for a meeting in Jerusalem but instead drives him to the Ramallah outskirts where Palestinian militants executes Rahum.
- March 1 – Mei Ami junction bombing: An Israeli is killed and nine other people are injured when a Palestinian suicide bomber detonates a bomb in a service taxi. Hamas responsibility suspected.
- March 4 – Netanya bombing: 3 elderly Israelis are killed in a suicide bombing in downtown of the coastal city of Netanya. Hamas claims responsibility.
- March 26 – Murder of Shalhevet Pass: a Palestinian sniper killed the 10-month-old Israeli infant Shalhevet Pass in the Avraham Avinu neighborhood in Old City of Hebron.
- March 27 – Talpiot industrial zone bombing: 7 people are injured in a car bomb attack during the morning rush hour in the Talpiot neighborhood in southeast Jerusalem. Palestinian Islamic Jihad claimed responsibility.
- March 27 – Egged bus No. 6 French Hill junction bombing: 28 people were injured, two seriously, in a suicide bombing on a northbound No. 6 bus at the French Hill Junction. Hamas claimed responsibility.
- March 28 – Mifgash Shalom attack: 3 Israelis are killed in a suicide bombing. Hamas claims responsibility.
- April 16 – Five mortar shells land, for the first time in the history of Israel, in the Israeli city Ashdod.
- April 22 – Kfar Saba bombing: A Palestinian Arab suicide bomber kills an Israeli doctor of American origin in Kfar Saba and injures 60 others. Hamas claims responsibility.
- April 23 – Or Yehuda bombing: 8 people are lightly injured when a car explodes in the town of Or Yehuda. Hamas claimed responsibility. Hamas claimed responsibility.
- May 8 – Murder of Koby Mandell and Yosef Ishran
- May 18 – Kenyon HaSharon bombing: 5 Israelis are killed in a suicide bombing in a shopping mall in Netanya and over 100 are wounded. Hamas claims responsibility.
- May 25 – Hadera bus station suicide bombing: at least 12 people are injured when a car explodes near the bus station in the city Hadera. Hamas claimed responsibility.
- May 27 – Jerusalem bombings: two car bombs detonate in the center of Jerusalem. The explosions caused no serious injuries. PFLP claimed responsibility.
- May 30 – Netanya school bombing: a car bomb detonates outside a school in the coastal city of Netanya. The explosion caused no serious injuries. Palestinian Islamic Jihad claimed responsibility.
- June 1 – Dolphinarium discotheque suicide bombing: A Hamas suicide bomber blows himself up at the entrance of a club on a beachfront in Tel Aviv. 21 Israelis are killed and 132 were wounded, all youths.
- June 22 – Dugit bombing: 2 Israeli soldiers are killed when a Booby trapped car explodes near the Jewish settlement of Dugit. Hamas claimed responsibility.
- July 2 – Yehud suburb bombing: 2 bombs which were planted in cars of 2 Yehud residents explode. The explosion caused no serious injuries. PFLP claimed responsibility.
- July 9 – Kissufim bombing: A Palestinian suicide bomber detonates his car near a in the Southern Gaza Strip crossing point of Kissufim. The explosion caused no serious injuries. Hamas claimed responsibility.
- July 16 – Binyamina Railway Station bombing: 2 Israeli soldiers are killed and 8 civilians are injured when a Palestinian suicide bomber detonates himself near the entrance to the Binyamina railway station.
- August 7 – Zohar Shurgi, 40, of moshav Yafit, was fatally shot in a drive-by shooting on Trans-Samaria Highway.
- August 9 – Sbarro restaurant suicide bombing: A Palestinian suicide bomber wearing an explosive belt weighing five to ten kilograms, containing explosives, nails, nuts and bolts, detonates his bomb. In the blast 15 people (including seven children) are killed, and 130 wounded. Both Hamas and the Islamic Jihad initially claim responsibility.
- August 12 – Wall-Street cafe bombing: One Israeli is killed and 15 others are injured when a Palestinian suicide bomber detonates himself at the "Wall-Street" cafe in Kiryat Motzkin. The Islamic Jihad claim responsibility.
- August 21 – Russian Compound bombing: Palestinian militants explode a bomb in the center of Jerusalem. The explosions caused no serious injuries.
- September 4 – Jerusalem car bomb attacks: Four bombs explode at the same time in Jerusalem. The explosions caused no serious injuries.
- September 9 – Nahariya train station suicide bombing: an Arab-Israeli who was sent by Hamas detonates himself on the crowded platform of the Nahariya Railway Station, killing 3 Israelis and injuring 94. Hamas claim responsibility.
- September 9 – Beit Lid Junction bombing: 12 Israelis are injured when 2 car bomb attacks near a bus at the Beit Lid junction near Netanya. The Islamic Jihad claim responsibility.
- September 15 – Meir Weisshaus, 23, of Jerusalem, was fatally shot in a drive-by shooting on the Ramot-French Hill road.
- October 1 – Talpiot neighborhood bombing
- October 7 – Erez Crossing bombing
- October 7 – Kibbutz Shluhot bombing
- October 17 – Assassination of Rehavam Ze'evi: The Israeli tourism minister Rehavam Zeevi is assassinated in Jerusalem Hyatt hotel by four Palestinian Arab gunmen, members of the PFLP terrorist organization
- November 4 – Shoshana Ben Ishai, 16, of Betar Illit, and Menashe (Meni) Regev, 14, of Jerusalem were killed when a Palestinian terrorist opened fire with a sub-machine gun shortly before 16:00 at a No. 25 Egged bus at the French Hill junction in northern Jerusalem. 45 people were injured in the attack.
- November 26 – Erez Crossing bombing
- November 29 – Egged bus 823 bombing: Three people are killed and nine wounded in a suicide bombing of a bus near Hadera. Both Islamic Jihad and Fatah claimed responsibility.
- December 1 – Ben Yehuda Street Bombing
- December 2 – Haifa bus 16 suicide bombing
- December 5 – Hilton Mamilla bombing
- December 9 – Check Post Junction bombing
- December 12 – Neve Dekalim bombing

Notable Israeli military operations against Palestinian militancy targets
The most prominent Israeli military counter-terrorism operations (military campaigns and military operations) carried out against Palestinian militants during 2001 include:

- February 13 – The Israeli army assassinate Force 17 commander Massud Ayyad in Jabaliya, firing four air-to-surface rockets at his car. Israel states that he was the leader of a Gaza-based Hizbullah cell.
- May 7 – Israel seizes the Palestinian freighter "Santorini" near the shores of Haifa which was on her way from Lebanon to the shores of the Gaza Strip and was found to be carrying a massive amount of weaponry.
- May 18 – In retaliation for a suicide attack earlier in the day Israeli air-force F16s drop 1,100 lb bombs on targets in Gaza City, Nablus, Ramallah and Tulkarm, killing twelve Palestinians and wounding 90. The first use of warplanes in Palestinian areas since 1967.
- July 13 – Hamas activist Fawaz Badran, is killed in Tulkarm when his car explodes in an apparent assassination.
- July 17 – In retaliation to a Palestinian suicide attack which took place the day before in the Binyamina Railway Station, an Israeli helicopter killed four Hamas activists in Bethlehem, whom Israel claimed were planning an attack on the closing ceremony of the Maccabiah Games.
- August 5 – Israeli helicopters fire a pair of laser-guided rockets at a car in the northern West Bank city of Tulkarm carrying the Hamas activist Amer Hassan Madiri.
- August 10 – following the events of the Al-Aqsa Intifada and in response to the Sbarro restaurant massacre, Israeli border police forces raided and took control over the Orient House in East Jerusalem, which was used in the 1980s and 1990s as the headquarters of the PLO in East Jerusalem, as well as nine other unofficial PLO offices in Jerusalem.
- August 27 – Israeli helicopters fire two missiles at a building in Ramallah killing the General Secretary of the Popular Front for the Liberation of Palestine Mustafa Zibri which Israel considered responsible for a string of car bombing attacks.

=== Unknown dates ===
- The Moshe Aviv Tower skyscraper in Ramat Gan officially opens, becoming the tallest building in Israel. (standing at 244.1 m)

== Notable births ==
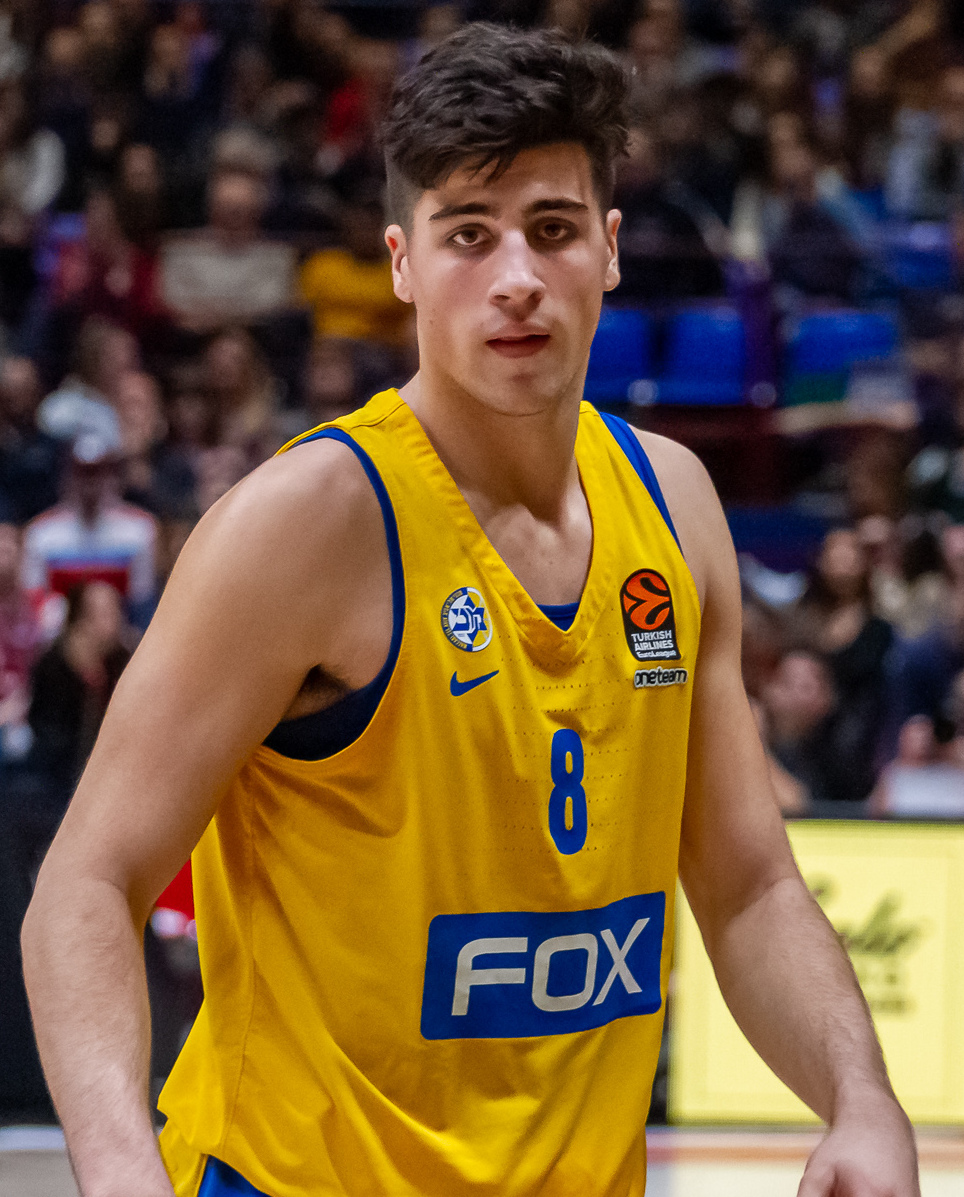
Deni Avdija

- January 3 – Deni Avdija, Israeli-Serbian basketball player
- February 7 – Shani Louk, murder victim (d. 2023)
- March 12 – Anna Zak, Russian-born Israeli singer, model, and influencer
- April 10 – Noa Kirel, musician
- April 19 – Odeya, musician
- August 31 – Yael Shelbia, model and actress
- October 3 – Liel Abada, association footballer

== Notable deaths ==
- September 8 – Dudu Dotan (born 1949), Israeli entertainer and actor.
- October 17 – Rehavam Zeevi (born 1926), Israeli minister and former general, killed by Palestinian militants during the Second Intifada.
- November 2 – Rabbi Elazar Shach (born 1899), Russian (Lithuania)-born co-founder of the political parties Shas and Degel HaTorah, leader of the Lithuanian Orthodox community in Israel.

== See also ==
- 2001 in Israeli film
- 2001 in Palestine
