= Naftali Dean =

- נפתלי דין
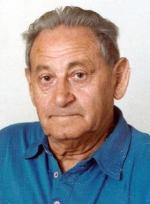
- Born: Naftali Dinovitzer; November 8, 1916; Botoșani, Romania
- Died: March 4, 2001 (aged 84); Hillel Yaffe Medical Center, Israel
- Cause of death: 2001 Netanya bombing

Naftali Dean (Hebrew: נפתלי דין; November 8, 1916 – March 4, 2001), born Naftali Dinovitzer, was the first mayor of the local council of Tel Mond between the years 1954–1970. Dean was killed in the Netanya terror attack which took place on March 4, 2001.

== Biography ==
Dean was born in Botoșani in Romania to Clara and Aaron Dinovitzer. In 1935 Dean immigrated to the British Mandate for Palestine as a journalist covering the events of the Maccabiah Games and remained in the country afterwards. In 1937 he arrived in Tel Mond where he worked as a carpenter in the cooperative "Nagarei HaAriza" (נגרי האריזה). Between the years 1939–1945 Dean helped establish a British military camp in Pardesiya and guard the surrounding communities.

In 1946 Dean worked as the work organiser in the labour and in 1947 he was appointed as the Secretary of the bureau. In the 1948 Arab–Israeli War Dean commanded the district of the village Ziv (nowadays part of moshav Kfar Hess in the Sharon plain), for which he was later on awarded the Haganah emblem.

In 1954, with the establishment of the local council in Tel Mond, Dean was appointed as the mayor of the local council of Tel Mond. Dean served in this position until 1970.

In 1962 Dean received an outstanding citizen certificate from Israeli President Yitzhak Ben-Zvi. In 1980 Dean received an honorary citizenship on behalf of the Council of Tel Mond. Upon his retirement, in 1970 Dean underwent an insurance agents course and afterwards opened his own office in Netanya, where he worked until the day of his death.

On March 4, 2001, while on his way to his office, Dean was critically wounded in a Palestinian suicide attack which took place in the centre of Netanya. Dean was rushed to the Hillel Yaffe Medical Center and died five hours later from his wounds. His daughter's sister, Shlomit Ziv, whom he met by chance right before the attack took place, was killed instantly in the attack. Dean was buried in the Tel Mond cemetery. After his death, the first Council house in Tel Mond was named after him - "Naphtali Building" (בית נפתלי).
