= Woke Up Dead =

American web series

- Genre: Horror/comedy
- Created by: John Fasano
- Directed by: Tim O'Donnell
- Starring: Jon Heder; Krysten Ritter; Josh Gad
- Country of origin: United States
- Original language: English
- No. of seasons: 1
- No. of episodes: 22

Production
- Producers: Brent V. Friedman; Stan Rogow; Jeff Sagansky
- Running time: 3 to 7 minutes

Original release
- Network: Crackle
- Release: October 5 – October 30, 2009

Woke Up Dead is an American horror comedy web series starring Jon Heder as a man who awakens in a full bathtub after "drowning" and has no heartbeat, prompting his friends (Krysten Ritter and Josh Gad) to believe he is a zombie. It began streaming on Sony Pictures Entertainment's Crackle app on October 5, 2009.

== Plot ==
Drex Greene (Jon Heder) accepts a pill from a stranger and wakes up in a bathtub after being underwater for over 15 minutes. His roommate Matt (Josh Gad) videorecords the happenings from there, which involve morgues, a medical student Cassie (Krysten Ritter), detective work, and an unknown stalker.

== Cast ==
- Jon Heder as Drex Greene
- Krysten Ritter as Cassie
- Josh Gad as Matt
- Daniel Roebuck as Shadow Man
- Wayne Knight as Andrew Batten
- Jean Smart as Drex's mother
- Ellia English as Diana Phillips
- Taryn Southern as Debbie, Drex's ex-girlfriend
- Meital Dohan as Aurora
- Christopher Emerson as Mystery Pill Guy

== Production ==
Woke Up Dead is a production of Electric Farm Entertainment, a company that produced Afterworld, which aired on Crackle in 2009. The show was executive produced by Brent V. Friedman, Stan Rogow, and Jeff Sagansky. Heder's co-stars are Krysten Ritter, Josh Gad, and Wayne Knight. New episodes streamed weekdays through the end of October 2009. The first episode was included on the Zombieland DVD. The show was released on DVD, not as episodes but as a continuous film of approximately 90 minutes.

== Episodes ==
No.	Title	Original release date
1	"Up and At 'Em"	October 5, 2009
Drex discovers Debbie his casual girlfriend romantically engaged with a tattooed drug dealer at a party. Later, his roommate Matt finds Drex drowned, but alive, in a bathtub. After Drex is hit by a bus and sent to the morgue, Drex meets medical student Cassie.
2	"The Waking Dead"	October 5, 2009
Drex explains the events of the previous evening to Cassie, and Matt makes plans to turn Drex's zombie life into an online phenomenon with his video camera.
3	"Dead TV"	October 5, 2009
Cassie offers hypostatsis-hematosis as an explanation for Drex's condition, and the search begins for Mystery Pill Guy (the tattooed drug dealer from the party).
4	"The Working Dead"	October 5, 2009
Drex starts a new job, meeting his weird cubicle neighbor Andy (Wayne Knight) and receives an interoffice message that asks him if he "woke up dead".
5	"Work It All Out"	October 6, 2009
Drex arrives home where Matt feeds him calf brains as an experiment. Outside, a van is surveilling Drex.
6	"The Searching Dead"	October 7, 2009
Drex, Cassie and Matt go to the party house to search for information about the pill, which Cassie suspects may be a central nervous system depressant.
7	"Lost and Found"	October 8, 2009
After running some tests, Cassie confirms that Drex's system is decaying but not affecting him negatively. At work, the mysterious interoffice messages to Drex continue.
8	"Dead Man Typing"	October 9, 2009
Drex finds that being a zombie gives him super skills. At work, his newfound powers challenge the reign of Andy, who pulls strings to have Drex subjected to a drug test.
9	"Someone Wicked this Way Comes"	October 12, 2009
Drex declines meeting Debbie, so Cassie is sent to handle matters. While Matt cheers up Drex, Cassie finds a clue about the mystery pill man. To use the new information, Drex risks his new job.
10	"Pill of the Dead"	October 13, 2009
The mystery pill man is revealed. Drex takes Matt and Cassie to see the man who gave him the little blue pill. One answer in this undead puzzle only leads to another, though.
11	"Feeling Groovy"	October 14, 2009
Drex returns to the hospital after he suffers a significant fall. He and Cassie discuss his relationship with Matt.
12	"IM of the Dead"	October 15, 2009
Drex wants to liven up his workspace with a picture of Cassie, but Andy raises an uproar. Possibly, he's the one who made that company policy. After the argument, Drex gets another IM from his Instant Message stalker.
13	"Hide and Seek"	October 16, 2009
Drex is on the hunt. When the mystery IM'er chats again Drex tracks them down goes to meet them, but it might be a trap.
14	"Date Night"	October 19, 2009
Drex is out to find Pitsburgh666, the mystery IMer. Cassie and Matt are not going to let Drex walk into a trap alone. Arriving at the location, they find something that both frightens and turns Matt on.
15	"Warehouse of the Living Dead"	October 20, 2009
Drex gets distracted from his hunt for Pitsburgh666 when he meets an attractive fellow 'Zombie'.
16	"Single Dead Female"	October 21, 2009
Drex uses his new powers to track down WUD Girl, though she is proving hard to track. To find her, Drex lies about his whereabouts to Cassie and Matt.
17	"My Gun is Dead"	October 22, 2009
Drex is trapped by sexy WUD Girl. She does not want to hurt Drex; instead she hasan offer for him that he shouldn't refuse. Meanwhile, Cassie and Matt desperately try to find Drex.
18	"Back to School"	October 23, 2009
Drex returns to Aurora, the WUD Girl, to get answers. Matt and Cassie are left uninformed.
19	"Kiss of the Dead"	October 26, 2009
Drex spends more time with Aurora and learns that he has additional powers.
20	"The Not Bank Job"	October 27, 2009
Drex is becoming closer to Aurora and farther from Cassie, but she can keep an eye on him with Matt's variety of cameras.
21	"Night of the Dead Shark"	October 28, 2009
After breaking into his office and tripping the alarm, Drex and Aurora have to find a way out.
22	"Mother's Day"	October 29, 2009
After getting hit by a bus, Drex receives a visit from his mother, who has Drex's death certificate and an interesting secret.

== See also ==
- List of zombie short films and undead-related projects
