= Monogamy (film) =

- Directed by: Dana Adam Shapiro
- Written by: Dana Adam Shapiro; Evan Wiener
- Starring: Chris Messina; Rashida Jones; Meital Dohan
- Cinematography: Doug Emmett
- Edited by: Mollie Goldstein; Jeremy Kotin
- Music by: Jamie Saft
- Production company: Renart Films
- Distributed by: Oscilloscope Pictures
- Release dates: April 24, 2010 (Tribeca); March 11, 2011 (United States)
- Country: United States
- Language: English
- Budget: $1 million
- Box office: $21,527

Monogamy is a 2010 film directed and co-written by Dana Adam Shapiro. It is about the strained relationship of an engaged Brooklyn couple, Theo (Chris Messina) and Nat (Rashida Jones). Monogamy premiered April 24, 2010 at the Tribeca Film Festival and was given a limited theatrical release on March 11, 2011.

== Premise ==
Theo is bored with his job as a wedding photographer—the generic backgrounds, the artificial posing, the stilted newlyweds—so he develops an unconventional side business, called "Gumshoot," a service where clients hire him to stalk them with his camera. Becoming infatuated with one of his clients, a mystery woman who goes by the name Subgirl, Theo develops a voyeuristic obsession that forces him to confront uncomfortable truths about himself and his impending marriage with Nat.

== Cast ==
- Chris Messina as Theo
- Rashida Jones as Nat
- Meital Dohan as Subgirl
- Zak Orth as Quinny
- Ivan Martin as Will

== Reception ==
Manohla Dargis of The New York Times reviewed the film positively, writing "With modest resources, some nice digital camerawork and an appealing cast — the likable Ms. Jones draws you in easily — Mr. Shapiro keeps you engaged even when his story falters. Theo turns out to be its weakest link…The problem isn’t that [he] isn’t especially good or interesting company, if through no fault of Mr. Messina’s, who doesn’t try to appeal to your sympathies. It’s that Mr. Shapiro appears unsure whether his character, who’s slow on the uptake (you’ll see the ending long before he does), deserves contempt, pity or kindness."

Katey Rich of CinemaBlend wrote, "Without presenting anything particularly revolutionary or even unique, Monogamy is still a pretty satisfying take on a basic story that's fascinated filmmakers for decades." She also praised its "elegant-- maybe a little over-elegant-- cinematography, an excellent sense of place within New York, an inventive score and a well-rounded supporting cast."

Review aggregator website Rotten Tomatoes reports an approval rating of 48% based on 25 reviews.
