= Botoșani =

Municipality in Botoșani County, Romania

- Municipality
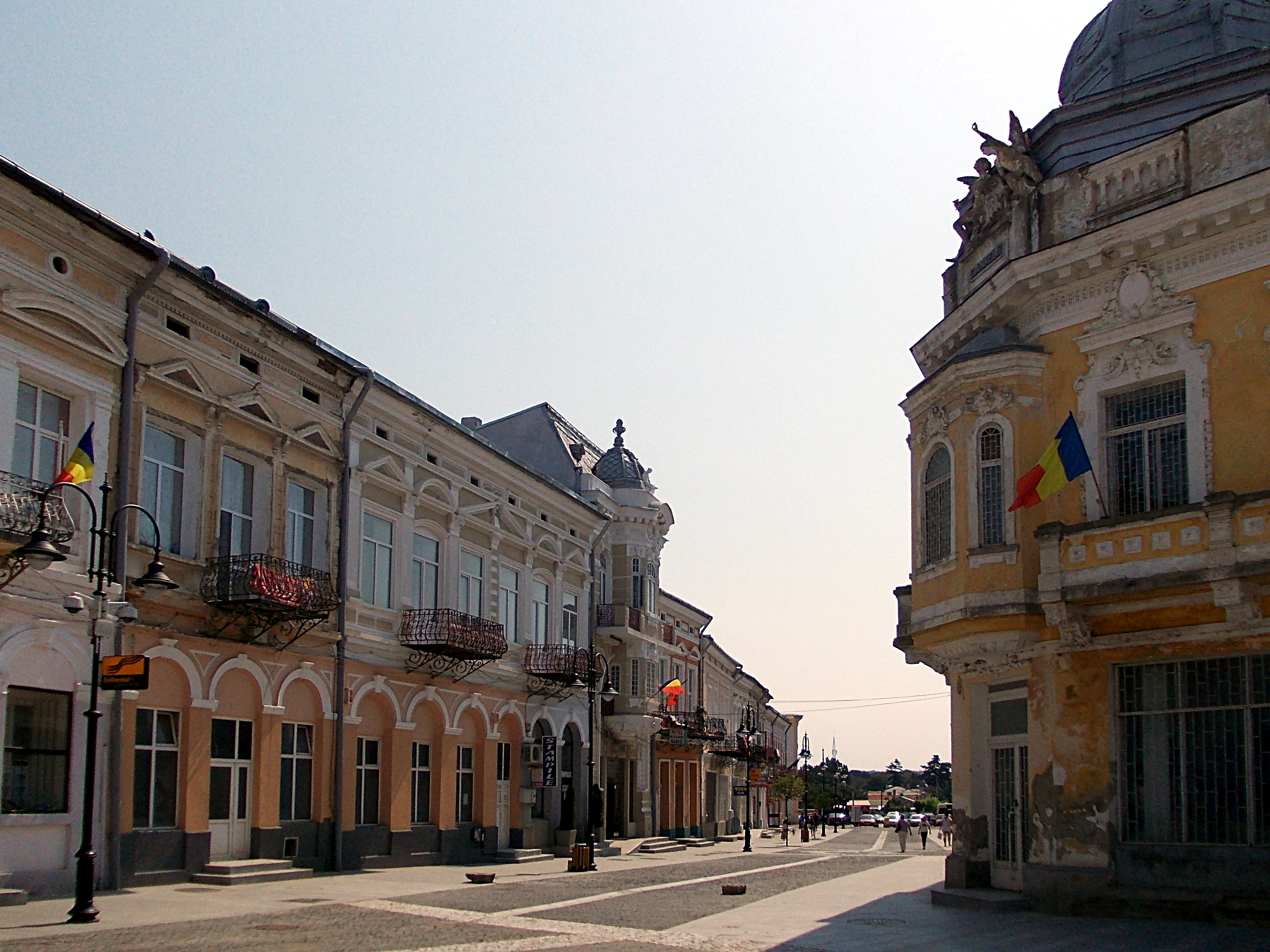
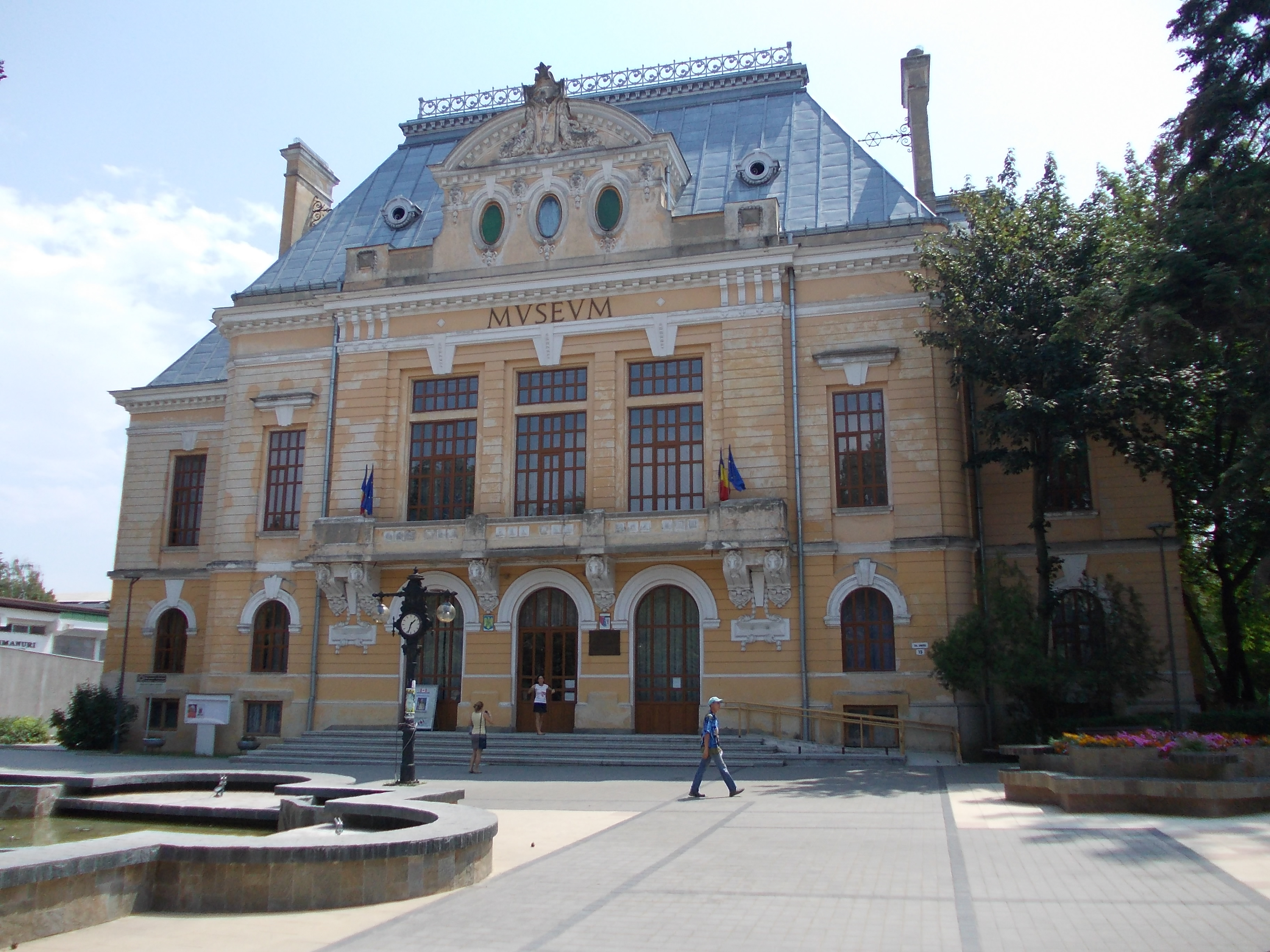
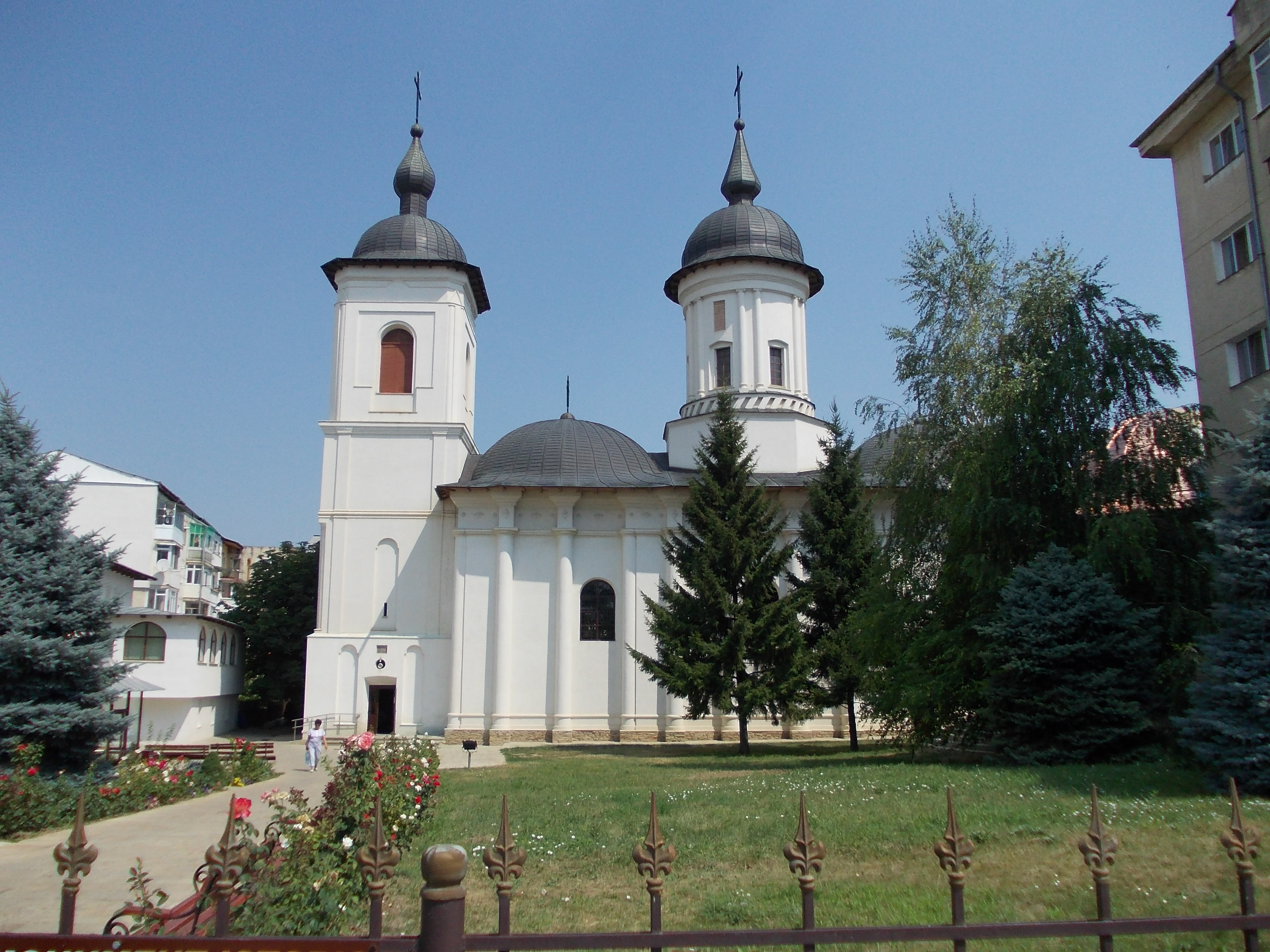
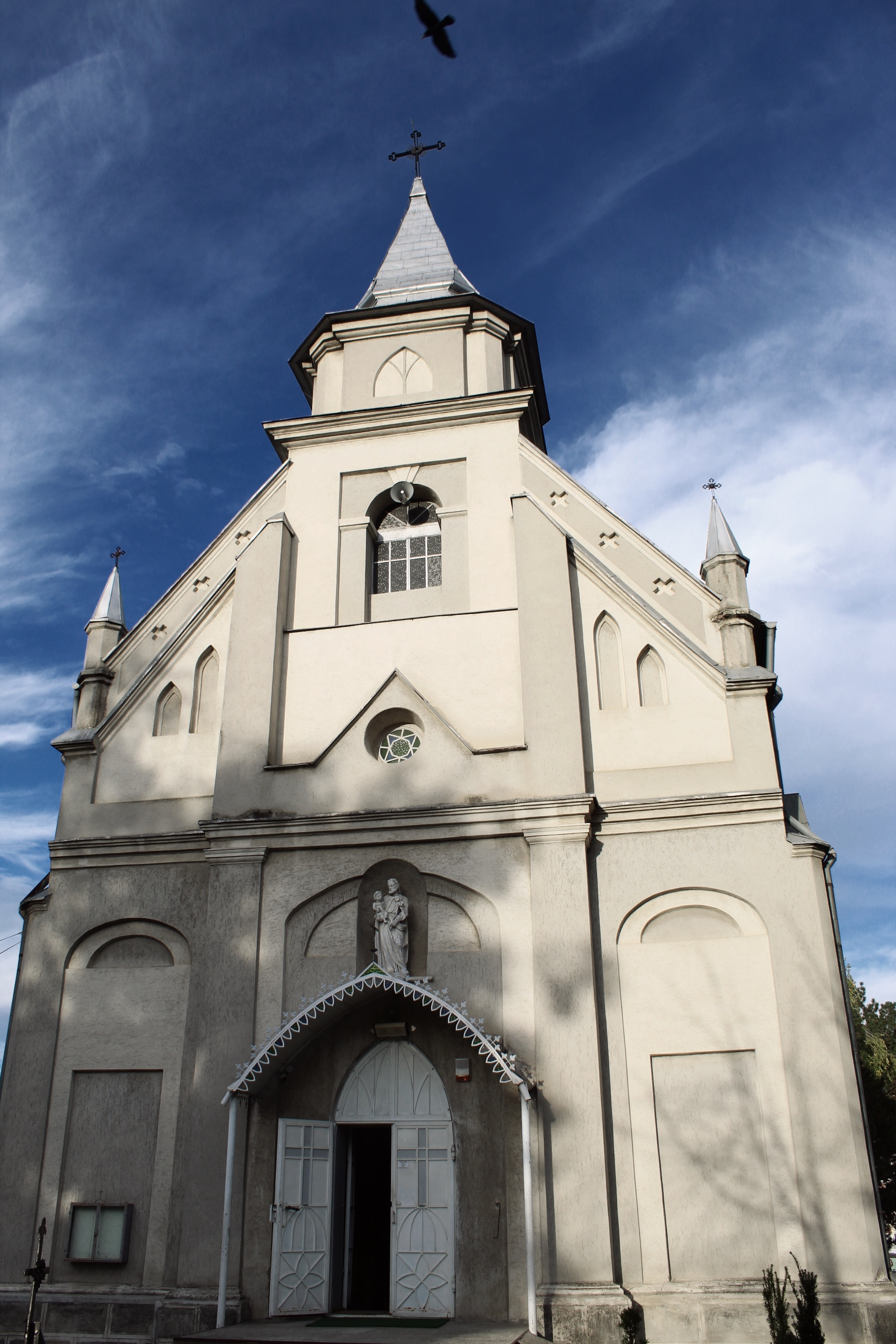
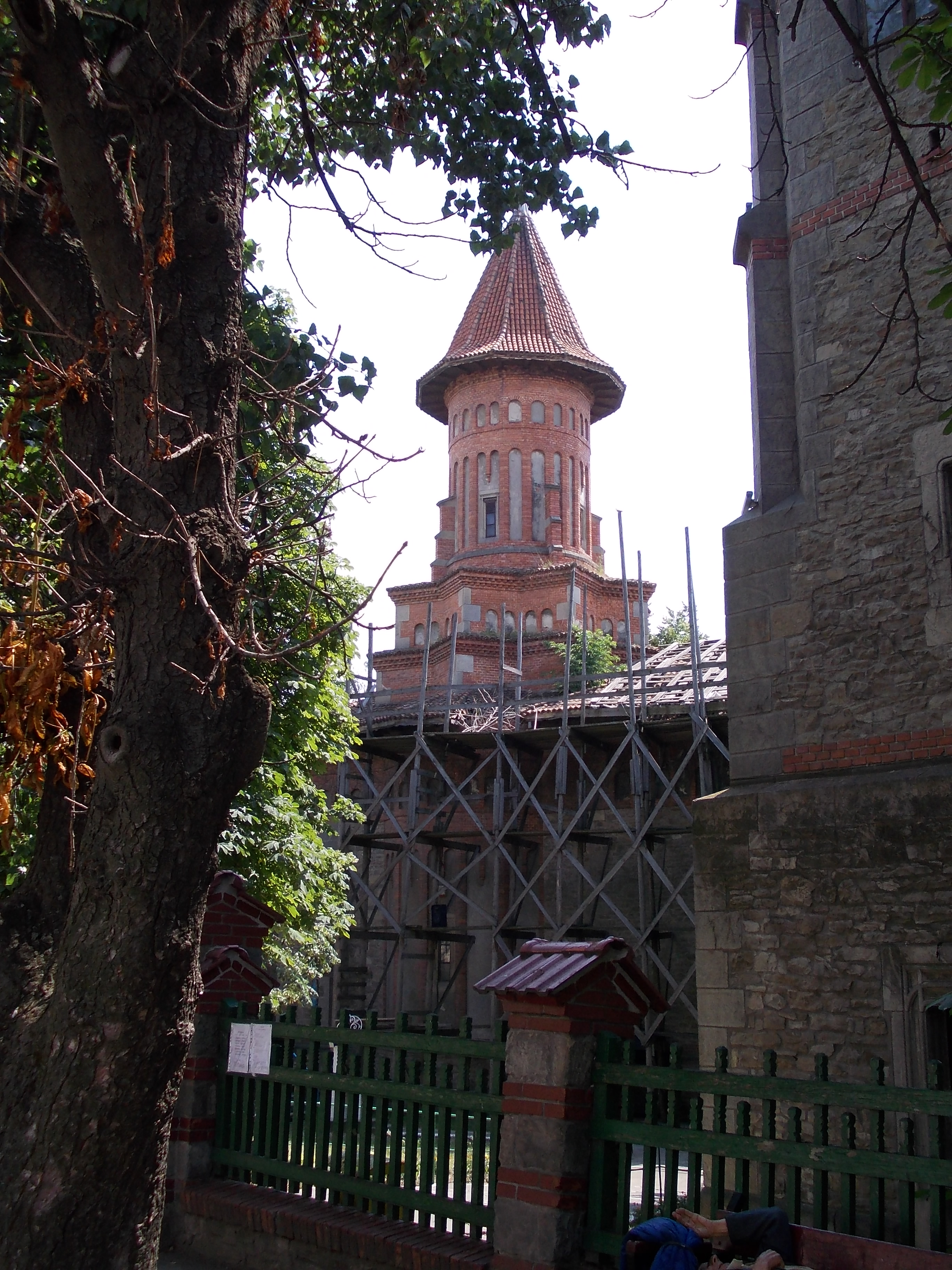
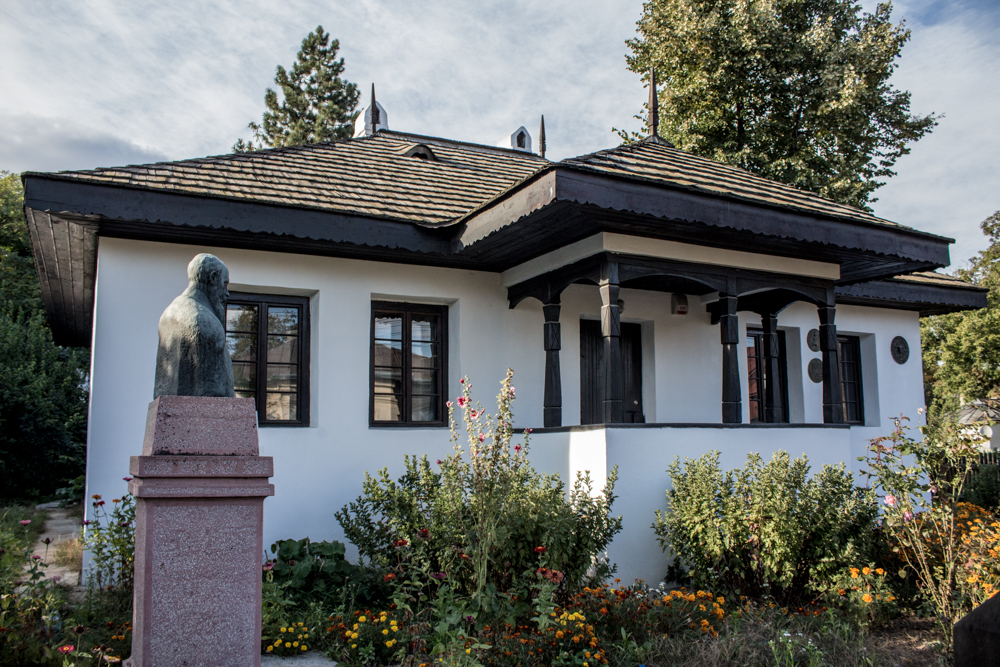
- Old Town Botoșani County Museum Saint Elijah's Church Roman Catholic Church Saint George's Church Nicolae Iorga Memorial House Mihai Eminescu County Library

- Coat of arms

- Location in Botoșani County

- Location in Romania
- Coordinates: 47°44′55″N 26°40′10″E
- Country: Romania
- County: Botoșani
- Established: 1439 (first mention)

Government
  - Mayor (2024–2028): Cosmin-Ionuț Andrei (PSD)
- Area: 41.36 km^{2} (15.97 sq mi)
- Elevation: 170 m (560 ft)
- Population (2021-12-01): 90,010
  - Density: 2,176/km^{2} (5,636/sq mi)
- Time zone: UTC+02:00 (EET)
  - Summer (DST): UTC+03:00 (EEST)
- Postal code: 710xxx
- Area code: +40 x31
- Vehicle reg.: BT
- Website: primariabt.ro

Botoșani (Romanian pronunciation: [botoˈʃanʲ]) is the capital city of Botoșani County, in the northern part of Moldavia, Romania. Today, it is best known as the birthplace of many celebrated Romanians, including Mihai Eminescu, Nicolae Iorga and Grigore Antipa.

== Etymology ==
The name of the city likely has its origin in the name of a boyar family called Botaș, whose name can be found in old records dating to the rule of Stephen the Great in the 15th century. Considered to be one of the most prosperous families in historical Moldavia, their lineage traces back to the 11th century.

== History ==
Botoșani is first mentioned in 1439, in which one chronicle says that "the Mongols came and pillaged all the way to Botușani". In 1498, Moldavian voivode Stephen the Great defeated the Ottoman army of Sultan Bayezid II near Botușani. The town is then mentioned only during the conflicts between Moldavia and Poland: several battles were fought near the town, in 1500, 1505 and 1509. During the reign of Petru Rareș, the town was set ablaze by the Poles. Evidence indicates that the town had a hill fort during his reign.

In the 15th century, it was still not a fully-fledged town, but archeological evidence shows that it was a pre-urban settlement. During the second part of the 14th century, some Transylvanian colonists (most likely German or Hungarian) settled in Botoșani. Additionally, a large community of Armenian traders settled in the 14th or 15th centuries.

At the junction of several commercial roads including the "Moldavian Road", which linked Iași to Hotin, the city was initially a market town. By 1579 it already had "the biggest and the oldest fair of Moldavia".

Some of the most famous Romanian cultural representatives such as Mihai Eminescu, Romania's national poet, and Nicolae Iorga, the famous Romanian historian, were born in Botoșani. Contemporary poet Maria Baciu also hails from Botoșani.

It is also the location of A.T. Laurian National College, founded in 1859, one of Romania's oldest and most prestigious pre-university educational institutions.

=== Jewish community ===
Jews were present in Botoșani by the early 17th century, when the town's position on trade routes linking Moldavia with Poland, Bukovina and Bessarabia attracted Jewish merchants. The community subsequently grew through immigration from Galicia and Ukraine, becoming one of the largest and most important Jewish communities in Moldavia. In 1745, Moldavian prince John II Mavrocordatos granted the town's merchants, including Jews, the right to own houses, and in 1799 Alexander Ypsilantis granted the Jewish community the status of an autonomous corporation. By 1803, approximately 350 Jewish families were paying taxes in the town.

During the 19th century, Jews became an important part of Botoșani's commercial and artisanal life. A Jewish hospital was established in 1817, while secular Jewish schools for boys and girls opened in 1865 and 1896, respectively. The community also maintained numerous synagogues and prayer houses, charitable organizations and religious schools. By 1899, Botoșani had 16,817 Jewish inhabitants, comprising about 51% of the city's population. In the early 20th century, Jews constituted approximately three-quarters of the city's merchants and more than two-thirds of its registered artisans.

The community experienced recurrent antisemitism and official discrimination. During the 1907 Romanian Peasants' Revolt, peasants entered Botoșani and looted Jewish homes, businesses, synagogues and schools; two Jews were killed and more than 1,600 Jewish families were affected. After World War I, Romanian Jews obtained citizenship rights, and Jews became active in municipal politics. The 1930 census recorded 11,840 Jews among Botoșani's 32,355 inhabitants. Jewish communal life included a hospital, schools, an old people's home, charitable societies and a library, while Zionism had a substantial following in the city.

Persecution intensified after the establishment of the National Legionary State in 1940. Jewish property was confiscated or looted, Jews were excluded from public schools and professions, and thousands of Jewish men were subjected to forced labour. Approximately 8,000 Jews from Botoșani were assigned to forced labour during the war, about half of them outside the city. In June 1941, Romanian authorities began holding prominent Jews as hostages and threatening reprisals in the event of Soviet attacks or alleged espionage. Jews were also required to wear the yellow star.

Botoșani became a place of refuge and forced resettlement for Jews expelled from smaller communities in northern Moldavia. Their arrival increased the city's Jewish population to 15,502 by 1942. The local community provided the displaced with accommodation, food and schooling. Romanian authorities deported 148 Jews from Botoșani to the Transnistria Governorate, including people accused of communist activity or other political offences. Unlike the Jewish populations of Bessarabia and Bukovina, however, the majority of Botoșani's Jews were not subjected to mass deportation to Transnistria.

As Soviet forces approached in April 1944, Romanian officials withdrew and deserters and armed groups began looting the city. The Jewish community assumed many municipal and administrative functions, established a civilian guard, maintained the public hospital and old people's home, and registered births and deaths. After Soviet troops entered Botoșani, representatives of the Jewish community formally handed over the city, and Jews were temporarily appointed to public offices in the absence of Romanian officials. The Soviet commander warned the new officials not to turn Botoșani into a "Jewish republic"; this brief episode later became known as the Botoșani Jewish Soviet Republic.

After the war, survivors, evacuees and refugees from Transnistria, Bessarabia and northern Bukovina settled in Botoșani. The Jewish population reached nearly 20,000 in 1945 and was recorded at 19,550 in 1947. Subsequent emigration, principally to Mandatory Palestine and later Israel, led to a rapid decline in the community. Approximately 200 Jews remained in Botoșani in 1990 and 92 in 2003.

== Demographics ==
Historical population
Year	Pop.	±%
1859	27,147	—
1900	32,193	+18.6%
1912	32,574	+1.2%
1930	32,355	−0.7%
1948	29,145	−9.9%
1956	29,569	+1.5%
1966	35,220	+19.1%
1977	63,204	+79.5%
1992	126,145	+99.6%
2002	115,344	−8.6%
2011	106,847	−7.4%
Source: Census data

Historically, Jews constituted a large proportion of Botoșani's population. They numbered 16,817, or about 51% of the population, in 1899; during World War II, the Jewish population rose to 15,502 in 1942 as Jews from surrounding communities were concentrated in the city.

As of 2011 census data, Botoșani has a population of 106,847, a decrease from the figure recorded at the 2002 census, making it the 19th largest city in Romania. The estimated population as of July 2018 was 120,535. The ethnic makeup was as follows:

- Romanians: 98.1%
- Roma: 1%
- Lipovans: 0.6%
- Jews: 0.06%
- Other: 0.24%

== Culture ==
Botoșani is the birthplace of several notable figures in Romanian science and culture. Natives of the city include poet Mihai Eminescu, historian Nicolae Iorga, and mathematician Octav Onicescu, whose work gained recognition both in Romania and internationally.

=== Cultural institutions ===
- "Ciomac Cantemir House" (historic monument dating from 1800), today the headquarters of the "Ștefan Luchian" foundation ();
- "Nicolae Iorga" Memorial House, situated in one of the houses where great historian Nicolae Iorga passed his childhood. Two sections of the house hold a photo documentary exposition and an exhibition of Iorga's first written editions. Another section holds a regularly updated library of history. The Iorga family's salon boasts an interior dating from the final decades of the 19th century;
- "Octav Onicescu" Memorial Museum, realized in October 1995, houses the furniture that once belonged to the mathematician and philosopher Octav Onicescu. In addition, there are also his manuscripts, writings, diplomas, books from his personal library, family photos, and decorations, offering an intimate portrait of a Romanian polymath;
- County Museum (Ethnographic section), housed in a fine example of late-18th-century architecture that once served as the house of Manolache Iorga, the grandfather of the great historian Nicolae Iorga. Open to the public since 1989, the museum displays the most important elements of the area's rural culture; artifacts of the principal occupations (farming, animal husbandry, hunting, fishing, and beekeeping), traditional crafts (spinning, embroidery, furriery, pottery), traditional costumes, and other customary and traditional crafts specific to the Botoşani region.
- County Museum (Historical and Archaeological section), housed in a historic monument dating from 1913, presents in its 17 rooms the story of Botoșani's evolution from prehistory to the present. Exhibits include the dawn of civilization in the region, from the Paleolithic era, to the Neolithic era (with Cucuteni ceramics), and finishing with the Bronze and Iron Ages. More notable displays include weapons made of sharpened stone and bone, decorated pottery, anthropomorphic and zoomorphic figurines, seals belonging to the lords of Moldavia, and historic jewelry. The museum also includes artifacts from the oldest human habitation found in southeastern Europe, discovered in Ripiceni and partially reconstructed and displayed inside the museum.
- "Ștefan Luchian" Art Galleries, the fine-arts section of the County Museum, pays tribute to Botoșani's rich artistic heritage, including the paintings of Ștefan Luchian, Octav Băncilă, and many other contemporary artists; the works of many renowned illustrators, foremost among them Ligia Macovei, the most celebrated illustrator of the poems of Eminescu; the sculptures of Iulia Onila and Dan Covătaru; and the tapestries of Cela Neamţu, Aspazia Burduja, and Ileana Balotă;
- "Mihai Eminescu" National Theatre; the building was opened in 1914, partially destroyed by the bombings of 1944, and restored in 1958 and again in the 1990s. The theatre hosts a team of actors whose remarkable evolution was crowned by their winning of the Grand Prize at the International Theatre Festival in 2001 at Piatra Neamț. The Grand Hall of the theatre also hosts numerous other cultural activities, of which the most notable are the concerts of the Botoșani State Philharmonic.

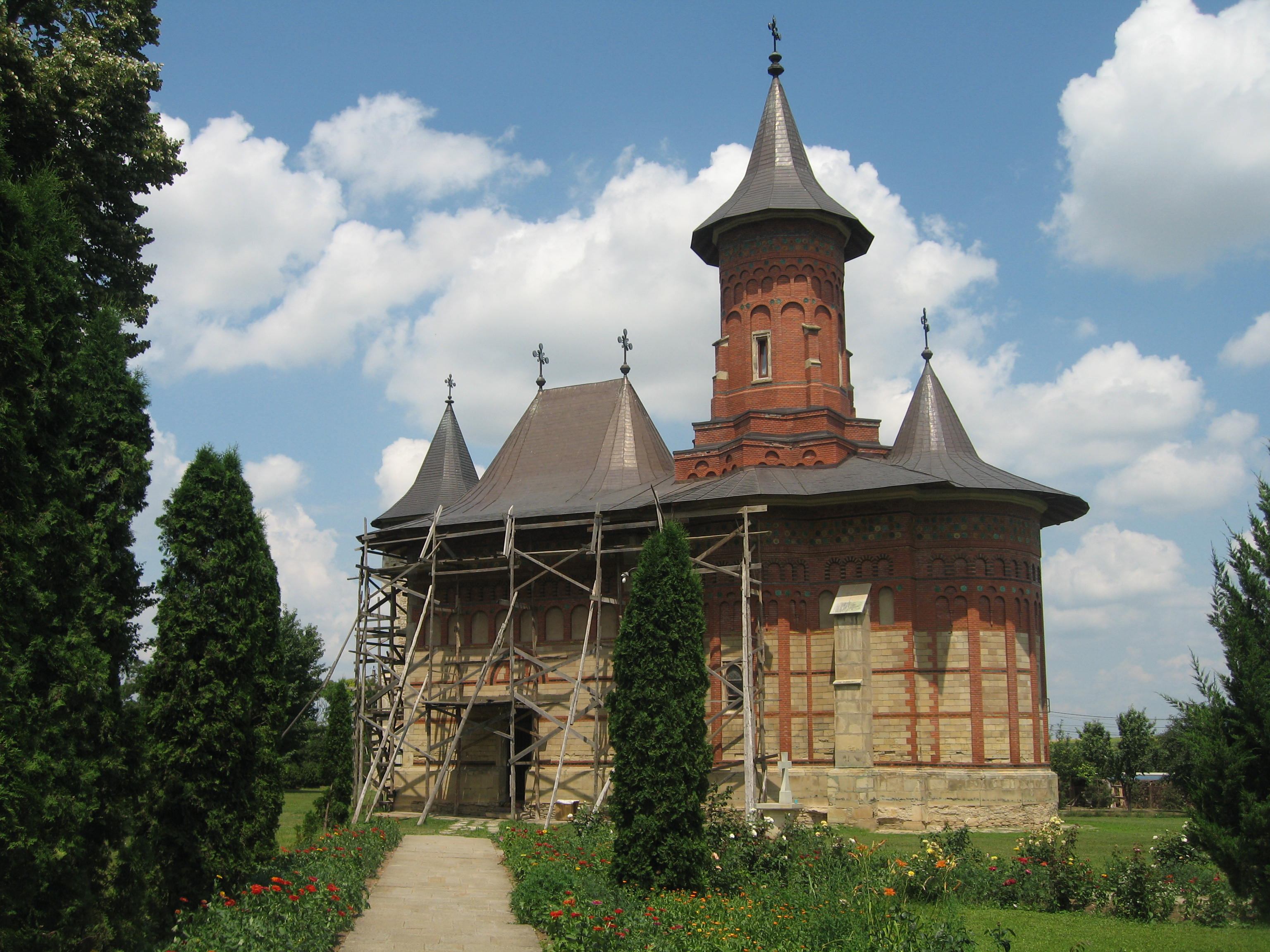
15th-century Saint Nicholas (Popăuți) church

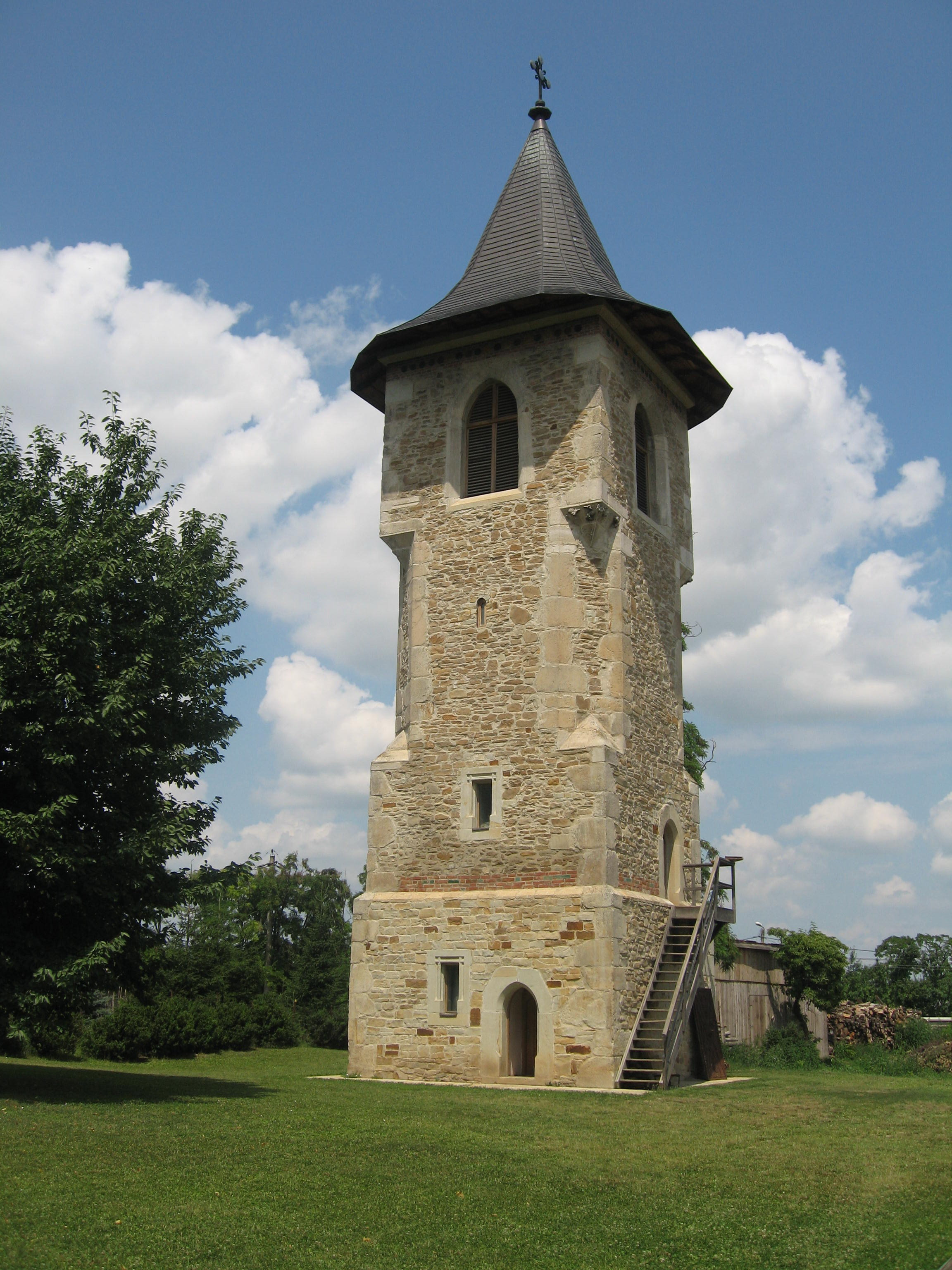
The bell tower of Monastery Popăuți, built in the 15th century by Stephen the Great

- "Vasilache" Puppet Theatre; home to a troupe of puppeteers appreciated not only in Romania but also abroad, as evidenced by their win at the International Puppet Festival in Silistra, June 2001. Every two years the theatre organizes the International Gala of Puppet Theatre, which brings to Botoșani the most prestigious names in puppet theatre, from Romania and abroad;
- Botoșani National Philharmonica, who generally perform in a 19th-century neoclassical building known as Vila Ventura, are renowned all over the county, its artists often finding themselves invited on a permanent basis to participate in concerts throughout Romania and abroad. The Philharmonic is the principal organizer of the series of tributes to George Enescu, tributes which benefit each year from the presence of the great personalities of Romanian art and culture;
- "Rapsozii Botoșanilor" Ensemble, a long-standing folkloric orchestra with a history stretching back for decades, presents a multitude of folkloric songs from Moldavia and the rest of Romania under the direction of its renowned leader, Maestro Ioan Cobâlă. The ensemble has long been associated with the greatest names in Moldavian folklore, such as Sofia Vicoveanca, Laura Lavric, and Daniela Condurache, and continues to nurture the next generation of folkloric talent. The artists of the ensemble are recognized nationally and internationally by virtue of their television appearances and their winning of numerous prizes;
- "Mihai Eminescu" County Library, housed in a building known as the "Casa Moscovici," a late-19th-century structure that combines French and German architectural elements in a unique synthesis. The library contains a collection of around 380,000 volumes;
- The Old Centre (The Old Downtown) is the oldest part of the city from an architectural standpoint, bringing together a large number of commercial buildings dating from the 17th and 18th centuries.

A series of historic churches built by the Lords of Moldavia :

- "Uspenia" Church - founded by Elena Rareş, the wife of king Petru Rareș, in 1552; the site of the christening of Mihai Eminescu.
- "Sfântu Gheorghe" Church - founded by Elena Rareş in 1551.
- "Sfântu Nicolae" Church (Popăuți) - founded by Stephen the Great in 1496. The monastery is surrounded by walls, giving the appearance of a small citadel.

Botoșani boasts many other constructions of special architectural value, among them: the Antipa House, from the end of the 19th century; the Bolfosu House, from the beginning of the 19th century; the Silion House, dating from 1900; and the City Hall, built at the end of the 18th century in an eclectic style with German influences.

- Botosánka is a dance of the Csángós.
- National Jewish Theater (Romania)

== Education ==
Alexandru Ioan Cuza University is the only higher education institution with a branch present in Botosani.

Notable high schools:

- A. T. Laurian National College
- Mihai Eminescu National College
- Gheorghe Asachi Technical College

== Climate ==
Climate data for Botoșani (normals 1991-2020, extremes 1981-present)
Month	Jan	Feb	Mar	Apr	May	Jun	Jul	Aug	Sep	Oct	Nov	Dec	Year
Record high °C (°F)	22.2 (72.0)	25.5 (77.9)	27.8 (82.0)	34.8 (94.6)	35.6 (96.1)	37.5 (99.5)	39.4 (102.9)	40.9 (105.6)	38.0 (100.4)	31.8 (89.2)	30.2 (86.4)	18.4 (65.1)	40.9 (105.6)
Mean daily maximum °C (°F)	1.7 (35.1)	3.9 (39.0)	9.6 (49.3)	16.7 (62.1)	22.6 (72.7)	26.0 (78.8)	28.0 (82.4)	27.7 (81.9)	22.1 (71.8)	15.6 (60.1)	8.4 (47.1)	2.9 (37.2)	15.4 (59.8)
Daily mean °C (°F)	−2.0 (28.4)	−0.3 (31.5)	4.2 (39.6)	10.6 (51.1)	16.1 (61.0)	19.9 (67.8)	21.6 (70.9)	20.8 (69.4)	15.5 (59.9)	9.7 (49.5)	4.3 (39.7)	−0.6 (30.9)	10.0 (50.0)
Mean daily minimum °C (°F)	−5.2 (22.6)	−3.7 (25.3)	0.0 (32.0)	5.2 (41.4)	10.1 (50.2)	14.0 (57.2)	15.6 (60.1)	14.8 (58.6)	10.3 (50.5)	5.5 (41.9)	1.1 (34.0)	−3.7 (25.3)	5.3 (41.6)
Record low °C (°F)	−29.2 (−20.6)	−28.5 (−19.3)	−20.3 (−4.5)	−7.6 (18.3)	−2.1 (28.2)	5.1 (41.2)	7.6 (45.7)	5.6 (42.1)	0.1 (32.2)	−8.0 (17.6)	−22.0 (−7.6)	−27.7 (−17.9)	−29.2 (−20.6)
Average precipitation mm (inches)	20.5 (0.81)	24.0 (0.94)	32.0 (1.26)	50.9 (2.00)	63.1 (2.48)	86.2 (3.39)	92.6 (3.65)	55.5 (2.19)	51.8 (2.04)	47.2 (1.86)	30.7 (1.21)	26.7 (1.05)	581.2 (22.88)
Average precipitation days (≥ 1.0 mm)	5.5	4.9	6.2	7.1	9.4	9.3	8.7	6.4	6.2	6.1	5.2	5.6	80.6
Mean monthly sunshine hours	74.3	97.6	150.8	201	260.4	270.3	293.5	277.7	201.1	150.9	84	65.7	2,127.3
Source 1: NOAA NCEI
Source 2: Meteomanz (records since 2021)

== Transportation ==
Botoșani is served by Suceava "Ștefan cel Mare" Airport (SCV), located 30.5 km (19.0 mi) west of the city centre.

Private entities operate 5 minivans lines.

The main public transportation service is a tram network with two lines, 101 and 102. Historically, Botoşani has used trams from the former Eastern Bloc, but began in 2019 to replace them with a modernized system. In the interim, the trams have been replaced with buses.

== Sport ==
FC Botoșani is the football team that represents Botoșani.

== Twin towns – sister cities ==
Botoșani is twinned with:

- Karaman, Turkey
- Laval, Canada

== Notable residents ==
- Florin Andone (born 1993), Romanian professional footballer
- Grigore Antipa (1867–1944), Romanian biologist
- Gheorghe Avramescu (1884–1945), Romanian Lieutenant General during World War II
- Octav Băncilă (1872–1944), Romanian realist painter and left-wing activist
- Israil Bercovici (1921–1988), Jewish Romanian dramaturg, playwright and director
- Max Blecher, (1909–1938), Jewish Romanian writer
- Demostene Botez (1893–1973), Romanian poet and prose writer
- Pascal Covici (1885–1964), Romanian Jewish-American book publisher and editor
- Georgeta Damian (born 1976), Romanian female rower and winner of five Olympic gold medals
- Naftali Dean (1916-2001), politician
- Mihai Eminescu (1850–1889, born Mihail Eminovici), influential Romanian poet, novelist and journalist
- Reuven Feuerstein (1921–2014), Israeli clinical, developmental, and cognitive psychologist
- Israel Freedman (1878–1934) Jewish Romanian-American Yiddish journalist
- Constantin Gane (1885–1962), Romanian novelist, amateur historian and memoirist
- Alexandru Graur (1900–1988) Romanian linguist
- Nicolae Iorga (1871–1940), Romanian historian, politician, literary critic, memoirist, poet and playwright
- Isidore Isou (1925–2007, born Isidor Goldstein), Romanian-born French poet, dramaturge, novelist, economist, and visual artist
- Dan Lungu (born 1969), Romanian novelist, short story writer, poet and dramatist
- Mime Misu (1888–1953, born Mișu Rosescu), Romanian ballet dancer, pantomime artist, film actor and director
- Octav Onicescu (1892–1983), Romanian mathematician and founder of the Romanian school of probability theory and statistics
- Elie Radu (1853–1931), Romanian civil engineer and academic
- Didia Saint Georges (1888-1979), Romanian composer
- Henric Sanielevici (1875–1951), Romanian journalist and literary critic
- Ion Sân-Giorgiu (1893–1950), Romanian modernist poet, dramatist and essayist, and far-right politician
- Artur Stavri (1869–1928), Romanian poet
- Adolf Josef Storfer (1888–1944), Austrian lawyer turned journalist and publisher
- Ana Toma (1912–1991), Romanian politician

== See also ==
- Botoșani Ghetto
