= Meital Dohan =

Israeli actress and singer

- מיטל דוהן
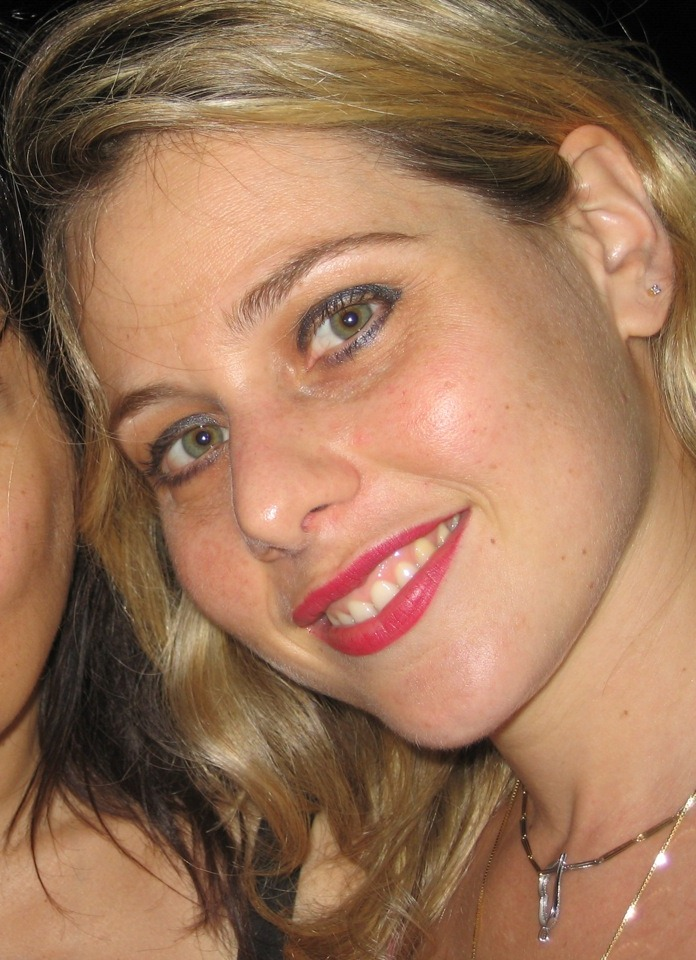
- Dohan in 2007
- Occupations: Actress; Playwright; Comedian; Radio host; Author; Activist; Musician
- Years active: 1998–present
- Height: 1.55 m (5 ft 1 in)
- Website: Official website

Meital Dohan (Hebrew: מיטל דוהן) is an Israeli actress and musician. She began her acting career on Israeli television, appearing on Dancing with the Stars, Esti HaMekho'eret (similar to Ugly Betty), and in Romeo and Juliet. Her work on US-television began when she appeared as Yael Hoffman on the Showtime series Weeds. She landed roles in the HBO series The Sopranos and as Aurora in the Sony Pictures web-comedy Woke Up Dead. Dohan stars in the films Foreclosure and Monogamy a thriller which won the Best Narrative Feature at the Tribeca Film Festival. Her roles in TV and film have led to two including two Ophir Awards and an Israeli Theater Award.

Dohan became involved in music in 2012 when she started to work with hip-hop producer Che Pope. She and Pope recorded her debut album, I'm in Hate With Love. Dohan then received international recognition for her first single "Yummy" and its viral video, which trended at No. 1 on ReverbNation. The single "On Ya" with Sean Kingston charted No. 5 on the UK Club Pop Charts and No. 31 on the Billboard Club Chart. The tracks were remixed by numerous DJs including R3hab and Sidney Samson.

== Early life, family and education ==
In 1994 Dohan joined the Israel Defense Forces and served in the IDF theater, later studying at Nissan Nativ acting school. During her studies, she received scholarships from the America Israel Cultural Foundation in 1996 and 1997 and a Cameri Theater Scholarship for Deserving Young Actress in 1999. In her first year of studies, she wrote, directed, and acted in an original theatre movement production. During the second year of studies, she began working in a variety of television productions and performed in two feature films in her third year. Before graduating, Dohan had signed a contract with Cameri Theater.

== Career ==
=== Acting in Israel ===
Dohan graduated from the Tel Aviv-based acting school Nissan Nativ in 1998. After graduating, Dohan held numerous acting roles at two major theatres in Israel. This began with the Cameri Theater, before also acting at the Haifa Theatre. While at the Cameri Theater, she played several roles which kickstarted her career. She starred in the role of Juliet in Romeo and Juliet at the theatre, but most notably won an Israeli Theater Award in 2000 (the Iraeli equivalent of a Tony Award), for her role in "Best Friends." The Theatrical award was in the 'Most Promising New Actress' category. A couple of years later, Israeli playwright Edna Mazia wrote a part into her play "Bad Children" specifically for Dohan. The role performance in Bad Children lead to another Best Actress award at the Israeli Tony Awards.

After working in theatre for two years, Dohan secured her first major film role as Efrat in the Hebrew-language film Girafot (Giraffes), released in 2001. After she filmed her scenes in the film but prior to its release, Dohan also had roles in The Legend of the Silent Man in 1998 and Instructions Not Included in 1999. Her role in Giraffes led to her first nomination for an Ophir Award (the Israeli equivalent to Oscar) in 2002. For her role in Giraffes she studied French. The film also later won at the 2003 Scottsdale Arizona Film Festival. Her next film, God's Sandbox involves an author who searches for her daughter in the Sinai desert. The film won an award at the 2002 Manchester film festival.

Dohan returned to theater in 2003, where she sang and acted in Moving Flesh at the Cameri Theater. She also began directing at the Tmu-na Theater and co-wrote the original Revue Love Sex on the High Holidays along with Israeli singer Ivri Lider. Aside from theater work, Dohan secured a major TV role, in the Israeli version of Ugly Betty. She played the central comedic role of Nataly. The series was very popular in Israel, winning a number of awards. It won the Ophir Award for Best Comedy Series in 2003, and Dohan won an Israeli Tony Award for her work in the series for her lead role. Later in the same year, Dohan co-wrote a movie script, Orgy by Heart, along with Maayan Keret.

=== Move to United States ===
In 2003, Dohan secured her first role in the United States. She was invited by Karen Shefler to perform in an adaptation of Blood Wedding by Federico García Lorca. Dohan then announced she was working on the one-woman comedy show, Bath Party. It was created by Dohan along with Karen Shefler and Ayelet Dekel and it was performed Off-Broadway at the HERE Arts Center. The theatrical performance was Dohan's big break in US-theatre, receiving positive reviews in New York-based media. In The New York Times review of Bath Party, Dohan was characterized as "a younger, prettier, blonder Rosanna Arquette", noting it as an essentially a one-woman show which "focuses on her not particularly interesting efforts to jump-start an American career, complete with film and television clips, circumlocutory monologues and, perhaps most important for this particular performer, multiple opportunities to reveal her appealing anatomy", and also praising the work of the few others in the cast. Village Voice praised Dohan's work in the play, claiming, "What saves the piece from being a purely wandering, aimless morass is the droll humor and keen comedic timing of Dohan and her associates. Dohan has a sharp wit and notable ability to find the unlikely joke". In 2004, she starred in the feature film To Dance. In speaking toward her work with her co-stars, they wrote, "Their quick banter and easy back-and-forth are polished and at times charming, and together they make even the most disjointed material a pleasure to watch". Later, Dohan co-wrote Love and Sex on the High Holidays with Israeli singer Ivri Lide.

Dohan's big break in the US occurred in 2006. After the first season of the television show Weeds, Dohan secured the role as Yael Hoffman, an admissions director at the rabbinical school that one of the main characters Andy Botwin attended. Dohan appeared in every episode of Season 2. She returned for the 100th episode in 2012.

In 2008, she appeared in both the Off-Broadway and Los Angeles productions of the play Stitching by controversial British playwright Anthony Neilson and directed by Timothy Haskell, an example of "in-yer-face" theater. The play confronts the audience with shocking and sometimes vulgar depictions of human behavior. The Forward said Dohan "Shines on the New York Stage". Of Dohan's work in the Neilson play, The New York Times wrote "With an actress as extremely gorgeous as Meital Dohan and a script that requires her to thrash around in ways most often seen in straight-to-video steamers, you would think that Stitching would be heating up the Wild Project theater to the boiling point." They found that it did not, blaming the Neilson script for working "so hard at being gimmicky that it doesn't give Ms. Dohan and her co-star, Gian Murray Gianino, a chance to find real chemistry. No chemistry, no combustion." They granted that the two leads "give energetic, bruise-inducing performances under Timothy Haskell's direction", but that the script's manner of ricocheting "from comedy to pathos to psychosis without ever really providing the starting point that any play needs" placed too many demands on them.

In 2009, she appeared in two episodes of the online series Woke Up Dead. The series is about a young man who wakes up in a bath tub and has no heartbeat, making friends believe he became a zombie. Dohan plays the character Aurora. The online series received positive reviews, including one from the Los Angeles Times. In 2010, Dohan became the official Spokesperson for Artists 4 Israel and their mural project Paint Israel which aimed to paint the bomb shelters in Sderot and show that America's young, graffiti community supports the people of Israel.

Dohan returned to theatre in January 2011, headlining the Alan Bowne stage play Beirut in a limited revival directed by Andrew and Zach Zoppa in New York City. Later in the year, Dohan starred in the dramatic thriller Monogamy directed and written by Academy Award nominee Dana Adam Shapiro. The film centers on the strained relationship of a Brooklyn couple, Theo (Chris Messina) and Nat (Rashida Jones). The reviewer in The Los Angeles Times determined, "Meital Dohan has no lines in the indie thriller, but her sexy, mysterious presence helps propel the film ...." It notes that even though the character has no lines in the film, she receives top billing. The film won Best Narrative at the Tribeca Film Festival.

Dohan authored a book, Love and Other Bad Habits. In January 2011, she launched a webcast talk radio show, Loud Miracles, which airs on Women's Radio. On her show, Dohan declared, "I am fascinated by Transcendental Meditation and the effects of it. I was so taken by this technique that now we are talking about bringing more awareness to it and bringing it to people that serve in the Israeli Army."

In 2016, she joined the cast on Cabaret Maxime, starring as herself.

=== Music ===
In 2011, Dohan announced the production of her solo album I'm in Hate with Love. Dohan began working with producers Rami Afuni of LMFAO and Che Pope, who was best known for his work with Dr. Dre, Eminem and Lauryn Hill. In October 2011, Dohan debuted "Yummy Boyz", a viral video that was featured on pop sites including Popdust.com, which called the tune catchy, upbeat and exuding the same sexiness and playfulness that the actress turned singer represented. In February 2012, Meital debuted her hit single, "Yummy" produced by Afuni, on iTunes, MTVu, MTV Buzzworthy, MTV LOGO and MTV Networks. Following the success of her video "Yummy Boyz" and her debut single "Yummy", Meital released the track "On Ya" featuring Sean Kingston, which PopCrush called a "club banger". The single hit No. 31 on the Billboard Dance Chart and No. 5 on the UK's Pop Chart, even before it was officially released.

In addition, the song started playing on radio stations including KIIS-FM. "Yummy Boyz" received rave reviews by entertainment sites across the world, quickly solidifying her as a new gay icon and one of the Top 5 Artists to Watch according to PRIDE Radio and Dinah Shore. "Yummy" has also been the most spun single on PRIDE Radio, one of iHeartRadio.com's most popular channels and reached No. 49 on the Billboard dance chart. Due to the success of "Yummy", the singer performed at the Winter Music Conference, White Party, and The Dinah, who named Dohan one of the five emerging artists to watch in 2012. In addition, she presented at the 2012 International Dance Music Awards.

In June 2012, Interview premiered Dohan's second single "On Ya" featuring rapper-singer-songwriter Sean Kingston. Dohan officially released the single on 6 June 2012. Dohan also released an official video for "On Ya" on 14 October 2012, which included Sean Kingston and which garnered over three million views over one month. The video was directed by Ray Kay.

== Partial filmography ==
=== Television ===
- Puzzle (1 episode, 1999)
- Shemesh (1 episode, 2000) as Sarit
- Lochamey HaMasach (2002)
- Shaul (1 episode, 2002)
- My First Sony (2002)
- Esti HaMekho'eret (2003–2004) as Natalie Bushari-Mark
- Elvis, Rosental VeHaIsha HaMistorit (2005) as Natalie Bushari-Mark
- Elvis (2006) as Natalie Bushari-Mark
- The Sopranos (1 episode, 2006) as Yael
- Weeds (7 episodes, 2006) as Yael Hoffman
- Lo Hivtachti Lach (2006)
- Pa'am BaChayim (2007)
- Woke Up Dead (9 episodes, 2009) as Aurora
- Weeds (2012) as Yael Hoffman

=== Film ===
- Agadat HaIsh SheShatak (The Legend of the Silent Man) (1998)
- Bli Daf Hora'ot (Instructions Not Included) (1999)
- Girafot (2001) as Efrat
- Disphoria (2004) as Danielle
- Shark Tale (2004) as Angie (Hebrew dub)
- Tahara (God's Sandbox) (2004)
- If Only He'd Call (2006)
- Lirkod (The Belly Dancer) (2006) as Deby
- Failing Better Now (2010)
- Monogamy (2010) as. Subgirl
- Foreclosure (2011)
- Ponies (2010) (in production) as Aliah

== Awards and nominations ==
- 2002 Ophir Award Best Actress nomination for her role in Giraffes
- 2003 Ophir Award Best Actress nomination for her role in God's Sandbox
- Israeli Theater Award: work in Cameri Theater and for her role as Natalie in the TV series Esti HaMekho'eret
- 2000 Israeli Theater Award for Most Promising Actress for her role as Sofi in Best Girlfriend
