= Botoșani Ghetto =

Ghetto in Botoșani, Romania (1940-44)

The Botoșani Ghetto (Hebrew: גטו בוטושאן; Romanian: Ghetoul Botoșani) operated from September 1940 until April 1944 as an open ghetto in the city of Botoșani, which is located in the northern part of the Western Moldavia region in Romania.

== Botoșani before the Holocaust ==
Botoșani is the capital city of Botoșani County and by the mid-19th century hosted the second largest and most important Jewish community in Moldavia. Over the years, the number of Jews in Botoșani who were engaged in crafts grew, which aroused the opposition of the local Christian population, who demanded from the authorities to prohibit Jews from this trade. However, by 1899, more than 75% of the city's merchants, and about 68% of its craftsmen, were Jews. The city of Botoșani was a mother city in the history of Judaism in Romania. Before World War II, there were two synagogues in Botoșani that served the Jewish community in the city, today only one active synagogue remains.

== The Holocaust Period (1939–1945) ==
=== The Iron Guard Regime and the Deportation of Jews to Transnistria ===
During the Iron Guard regime (September 1940 - January 1941), the 10,900 Jews living in Botoșani were victims of economic oppression and various other restrictions. Many were abducted by the Iron Guard, beaten, and tortured. Jewish men in Botoșani, aged 15 to 70, were conscripted into forced labor even before the forced labor law was enacted in the country in December 1940. 8,000 Jews worked as forced laborers, half of them outside the city in labor camps such as Vădeni, Tiraspol, and Brăila. In addition to forced labor, the Romanian authorities deported 42 Jews suspected of being communists to Transnistria (a region with many concentration camps). Most of them were killed shortly thereafter by the SS and the Romanian Gendarmerie. The total number of Jews from Botoșani deported to Transnistria eventually reached 148, some of whom were accused of inciting against the government or illegal immigration.

=== Actions of the Romanian Ministry of the Interior ===
After the legionnaires (Iron Guard, in 1941) were dismissed, control of the city passed to the Romanian Ministry of the Interior and the Romanian police (the Romanian Gendarmerie). On 26 June 1941, following an order from the Ministry of the Interior, 20 Jews, mainly rabbis and slaughterers, were imprisoned as hostages, and it was announced that for every Russian bombing, two of them would be killed. In July 1941, there were between 50 and 60 hostages. They were imprisoned in two rooms in the Jewish school and eventually transferred to the Great Synagogue. The district prefect announced that he would execute 500 Jews from Botoșani by firing squad if a spy was found among them. The hostages were held in buildings of the Jewish community, such as schools and synagogues, under harsh sanitary conditions, sleeping on the bare floor without blankets during the harsh Romanian winter. No food was provided to the hostages, and the possibility of receiving food packages, clothing, and medicine from their families depended on bribing the guards. A barbed wire fence was placed around the buildings, and local police guarded the entrance. On 3 July 1941, the Ministry of the Interior canceled the order regarding the wearing of the Jewish badge, yet on August 14 of that year, the military command in Botoșani ordered: "Jews of all kinds and ages shall wear on the left side of the chest a six-pointed star made of yellow fabric, with a diameter of 7 cm, on a black background."

=== Actions of the Jewish Community in Botoșani ===
During this period, the Jewish community in Botoșani worked to assist those in need. After the Germans occupied Poland, the community took care of the many refugees who began arriving in the city. After Germany attacked the Soviet Union (June 1941), 11,000 Jews from villages and towns in the area were evacuated to Botoșani. They too were helped by the local community. As a result of the influx of refugees and the expulsion of Jewish students from public schools, the number of students attending elementary schools run by the community increased from 452 in 1940 to 1,050 in 1943. Two high schools were established, attended by 350 students.

=== Liberation of the Ghetto by the Red Army ===
As the Soviet Red Army approached the city in March 1944, the situation in Botoșani turned into anarchy, with gangs, mobs and deserters from the German and Romanian armies starting to rob the town. As government officials left the town, the Jewish community took over the city's municipal roles, established a civilian guard, and ensured the continued operation of the government hospital and the old age home in the city. The Jewish community's delegation surrendered the city to the Soviet forces after they entered Botoșani on 4 April 1944. Jews were appointed to public positions in the absence of Romanian personalities, but the Soviet commander warned them not to turn the city into a "Jewish republic".

== After World War II ==
After the war, people who were evacuated from the surrounding villages and those who returned from Transnistria settled in the city. As a result of this migration, the Jewish population of Botoșani rose to 19,550 in 1947. However, during the following years, many of Botoșani's Jews emigrated, mainly to Israel. By 1969, 500 families and four synagogues remained, the local shochet (kosher butcher) also served as the community rabbi. In 2004, 125 Jews lived in Botoșani.
