= Camp 80 junction bus 823 attack =

2001 suicide bombing in Israel

- Part of Second Intifada
- The attack site
- Location: 32°27′31″N 34°59′10″E; Israel
- Date: November 29, 2001; 24 years ago
- Attack type: Suicide bombing
- Deaths: 3 civilians (+1 bomber)
- Injuries: 9
- Perpetrators: Both Islamic Jihad and Fatah claimed responsibility

The Camp 80 junction bus 823 attack was a suicide bombing which occurred on November 29, 2001, on an Egged bus in northern Israel. The bus, en route from Nazareth to Tel Aviv, was traveling through the town of Pardes Hanna-Karkur. Three passengers were killed in the attack and nine were injured.

Both Fatah and Palestinian Islamist militant organization Islamic Jihad claimed responsibility for the attack.

== The attack ==
On the evening of Thursday, November 29, 2001, a Palestinian militant exploded a bomb he was wearing on the back part of an Egged bus on its way from Nazareth to Tel Aviv. The explosion occurred near Pardes Hanna, after passing an Israel Defense Forces training base. Three people were killed and nine were wounded, one of them critically.

Both the Palestinian Islamic Jihad and Fatah's Al-Aqsa Brigades have claimed responsibility for the attack.

Sources suspect that the bomber, identified as Samer Abu Suleiman from the West Bank village of Silat al-Khartiya by sources in the Islamic Jihad group, infiltrated into Israel near the Arab city of Umm al-Fahm from the Jenin area.

In Jenin, about 3000 Palestinians marched and celebrated after the attack, according to witnesses. They chanted "Sharon, prepare the body bags" referring to then Israeli Prime Minister Ariel Sharon.
