= Girafot =

Girafot (Hebrew: ג'ירפות, "Giraffes") is an Israeli rock band that was started in 1992 by Gilad Kahana and Yair Kass. In 1999, it released its debut album, and has released five albums in total.

== History ==
The band was created by Yair Kass and Gilad Kahana while they were serving in the IDF. It was initially named "Bat Yiftach" ("Jephtah's daughter"). They wrote some songs, but discarded them all except one, titled Girafot ("Giraffes"). Later they added the singer Rotem Dror, whom they asked to provide female background vocals for the song Rami Muasham be-Akhzakat Samim Kalim (רמי מואשם בהחזקת סמים קלים, Rami is Accused of Possessing Soft Drugs).

When they started recording the song Stereo, they decided that they should replace a drum machine with a live drummer, and added Didi Erez, Kass's childhood's friend. They also recruited Amir Tsoref, a well-known musician and producer, who had played with Noar Shulayim, Rockfour, Gingiyot, and other artists. At that time, the band's name was "Khatsi Hai" (חצי האי, "peninsula").

After the recording and before playing live shows, the band added the guitar player Erez Russo and changed its name again, to "Girafot", after the only surviving song from the previously discarded album.

After releasing the debut album Mesokheakh Im Kise (משוחח עם כיסא, Talking to a Chair), which included the hits Wow (וואו) and Yesh Lo Bakhurot Kmo Mayim (יש לו בחורות כמו מים), which attracted attention for their nonsensical lyrics. It also included the song Rami Muasham be-Akhzakat Samim Kalim, which got banned on Israeli radio stations for making direct references to cannabis culture, but drew even more attention to the band, and became a staple of their live shows. After releasing the album, the band began a long concert tour. In 2001, Didi Erez left the band and was replaced with Asi Sason. During that time Kahana started releasing solo albums, as well as publishing newspaper columns and books.

During the early 2000s the band played a lot of shows, and acquired a large fan base, thanks to the improvised speeches that Kahana gave at every show, providing his partly nonsensical commentary ridiculing current events.

In 2006, seven years after the release of their debut album, Girafot released its second album, Gag (גג, "roof"), which was characterized by a more somber tone and a heavier rock sound. The album received positive reviews. It included the hits Gag, Lekhet (לכת, Going), and Maher Miday (מהר מדי, Too Fast). At the peak of success, Rotem Dror left the band, although she later returned for some reunion shows.

In March 2008, the band released the single "Monogamy".

In July 2010, the band released the third album, Ein Knisa Le-pilim (אין כניסה לפילים, No Entrance for Elephants), partly inspired by its trip to India, which was also documented in the film "I Saw Giraffes in India", directed by Ronen Michaeli and Noam Pinkhas. The album was accompanied by the single Lo Yodea Lama Ze Kore Li (לא יודע למה זה קורה לי, I Don't Know Why Is It Happening to Me).

In May 2012, the band released the song Daphni Daphni, inspired by the work of the social activist Daphni Leef, calling it "a tribute to the woman who lit the first match".

In January 2013, the band released its fourth album Tsarikh Lisgor Hakol (צריך לסגור הכול, Everything Must Be Closed), which had a more protest tone, and was influenced by the 2011 Israeli social justice protests.

In August 2017, the band released its fifth album Mi Shelo Kholem, Koes (מי שלא חולם, כועס, Those Who Don't Dream Are Angry), with the singles Mi Shelo Kholem, Koes and Haklavim (הכלבים, The Dogs).

In May 2018, the band received an award for "Achievement of the Year" from ACUM.

As of the beginning of 2022, Gilad Kahana and Yair Kass are the two remaining members in the band.

== Discography ==
- Mesokheakh Im Kise, 1999
- Gag, 2006
- Ein Knisa Le-pilim, 2010
- Tsarikh Lisgor Hakol, 2013
- Mi Shelo Kholem, Koes, 2017
