= 2001 Netanya bombing =

2001 suicide bombing in Netanya, Israel

- Part of the Second Intifada militancy campaign
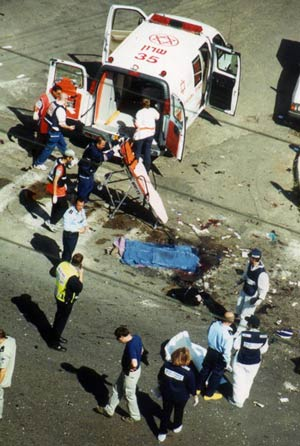
- The attack aftermath

- The attack site
- Location: 32°19′41″N 34°51′32″E; Netanya, Israel
- Date: March 4, 2001; 25 years ago c. 9:00 am
- Attack type: Suicide bombing
- Deaths: 3 civilians (+1 bomber)
- Injuries: 60+
- Perpetrator: Hamas claimed responsibility

The 2001 Netanya bombing was a suicide bombing which occurred on March 4, 2001, at the center of the business district of Netanya, Israel. Three civilians were killed in the attack and over 60 people were injured.

== Attack ==
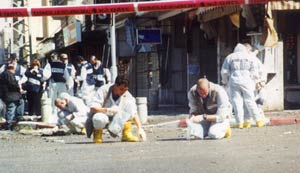
The attack aftermath

On Sunday, March 4, 2001, shortly before 9:00 am, a Palestinian suicide bomber wearing an explosive belt hidden underneath his clothes detonated the explosive device at a busy intersection in the center of the business district of Netanya, Israel. The force of the blast killed Naftali Dean, 85, of Tel Mond, his niece, Shlomit Ziv, 58, of Netanya, and Yevgenya Malchin, 70, of Netanya and injured over 60 people.

== Perpetrator ==
After the attack, the Palestinian Islamist militant group Hamas claimed responsibility for the attack and stated that the attack was carried out by a 23-year-old Palestinian named Ahmed Alyan who was a resident of the West Bank.

== Official reactions ==
Involved parties

Israel:

- Israeli Prime Minister Ariel Sharon stated that "the terror attack is a very serious one that shows that the Palestinian Authority is not taking the necessary steps"

Palestinian territories:

- Ahmed Yassin, the spiritual leader of the Hamas, stated that Hamas would continue to attack Israel until the Israeli occupation will be eradicated and stated that Israelis would "pay a price in accordance with the price paid by the Palestinian people."

International

- France: French officials condemned the attack in Netanya, but at the same time urged Israel to end the blockade on the Palestinian territories.
- United States: The Bush administration condemned the attack and requested that Arafat will arrest those responsible for the attack.
