= Misteryoso =

Single by Cup of Joe
- Language: Filipino
- English title: Mysterious
- Released: May 17, 2024
- Length: 3:41
- Label: Viva Records
- Songwriters: Gian Bernardino; Moon Cairo Peralta; Sam De Leon; Shadiel Chan
- Producer: Shadiel Chan

Cup of Joe singles chronology
"Lahat Ng Bukas" (2024)	"Misteryoso" (2024)	"Multo" (2024)

Audio sample
- file; help

"Misteryoso" (transl. Mysterious) is a single by Filipino band Cup of Joe, it was written by Gian Bernardino, Moon Cairo Peralta, Sam De Leon, and Shadiel Chan who also produced the song. It was released on May 17, 2024, through Viva Records.

== Background and release ==
After the successful of "Tingin" (lit. 'Look') with Janine Teñoso, Cup of Joe shared a teaser video on their social media accounts featuring Gian Bernadino and Raphael Ridao seated side by side, each wearing sunglasses and name tags that read "Mr. Yoso". The video concludes with Bernadino singing the song's title. Viva Records released the single on May 17, through digital download and streaming format.

== Music video ==
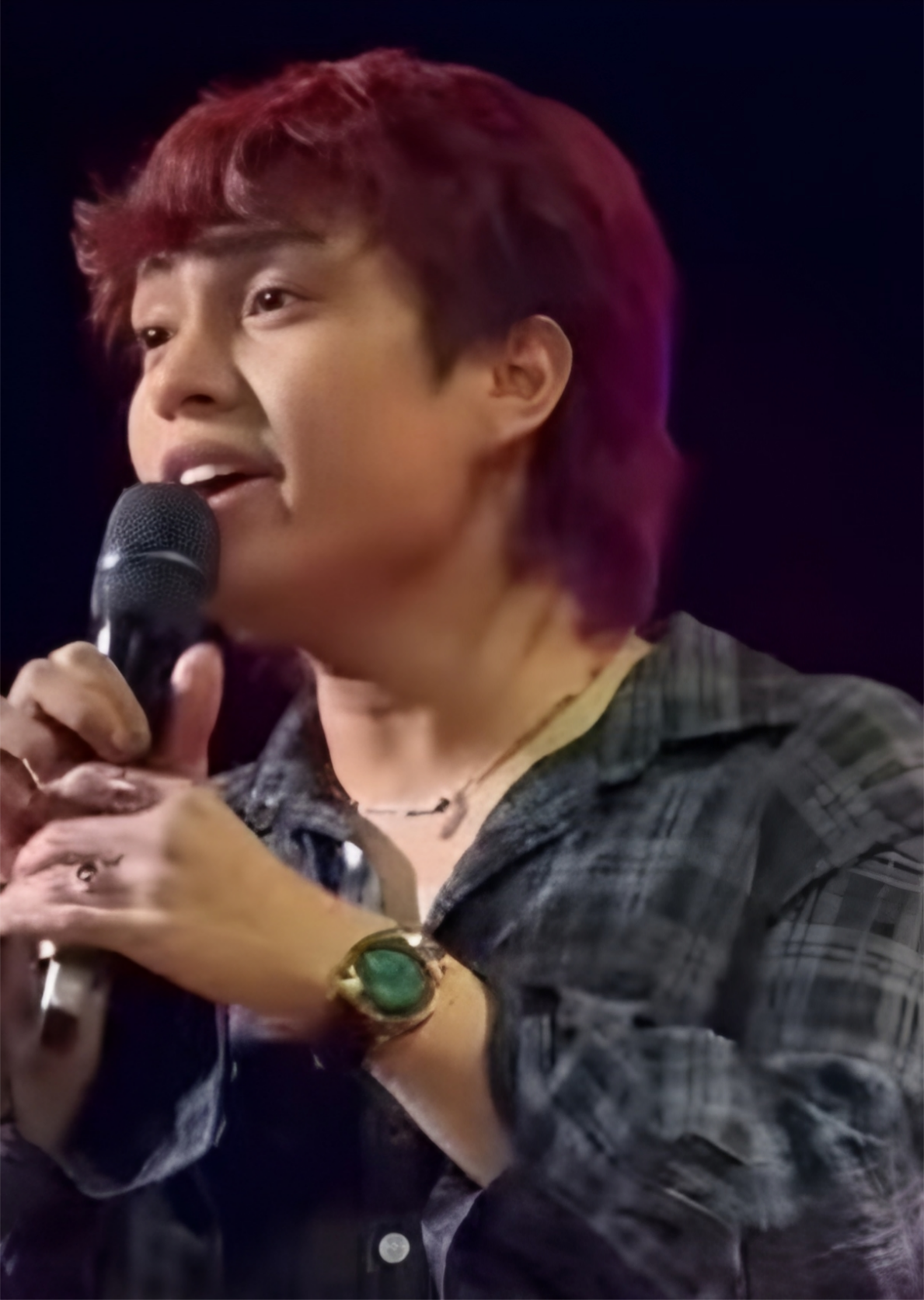
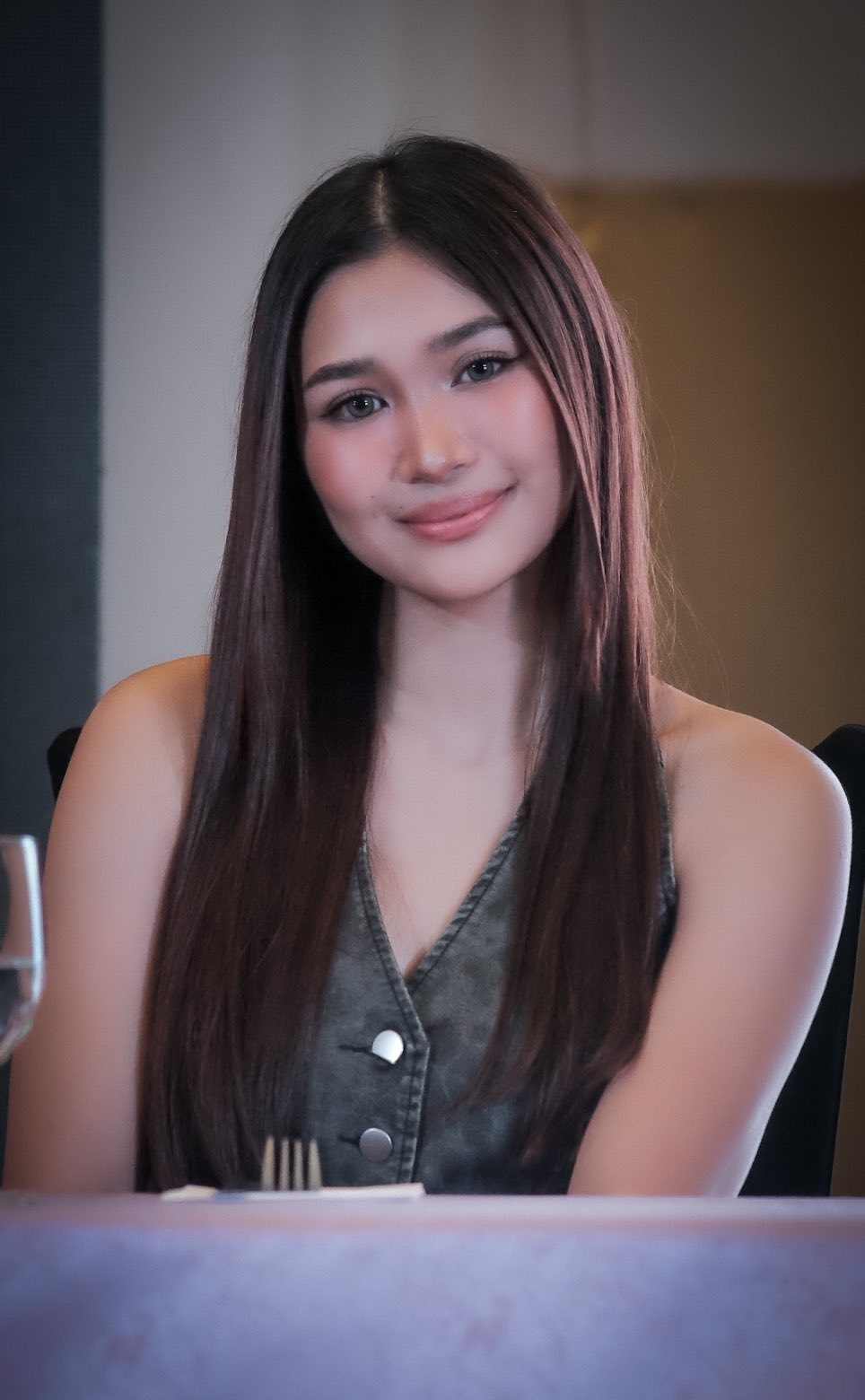
Gian Bernardino and Jhoanna Robles appear in the "Misteryoso" music video.

Directed by Justin De Dios of SB19 and produced by 1Z Entertainment. It stars Gian Bernardino and Jhoanna Robles, a member of P-pop girl group Bini. The storyline of music video follow Cup of Joe working at a design firm, where Gian's character becomes immediately drawn to Jhoanna's character upon her arrival. He begins to daydream about romantic moments with her in whimsical, fantasy like settings, but each time he snaps back to reality. Gian leaves affectionate notes and offers her a cup of coffee, while other members cheer on the building romance. The two characters come together, and the band joins in the celebration. The video ends with a bloopers and behind the scenes clips, including audio of Justin directing the scenes.

The music video reached number three on YouTube Philippines Trending for Music and garnered 500,000 views.

== Commercial performance ==
Following its released on May 17, 2025, "Misteryoso" deuted at number thirteen o the Billboard Philippines Hot 100, and also peaked at number eight on the defunct Top Philippine Songs chart. In 2025, the single entered at number fourteen on the Official Philippines Chart, a country specific subchart under International Federation of the Phonographic Industry (IFPI) the Official Southeast Asia Charts.

In December 2025, "Misteryoso" was recognized by Apple Music Philippines among its Top OPM Songs of the year, placing 10th.

== Charts ==
Chart performance for "Misteryoso"
Chart (2025)	Peak position
Philippines (Hot 100)	13
Philippines (Top Philippine Songs)	8
Philippines (IFPI)	14

== Accolades ==
Award	Year	Category	Result	Ref.
Awit Awards	2025	Song of the Year	Won	
Awit Awards	2025	Best Cover Art	Nominated	
Myx Music Awards	2024	Rock Video of the Year	Nominated	
P-pop Awards	2024	Production Design in a Music Video	Nominated	
PMPC Star Awards for Music	2026	Music Video of the Year	Pending	
Wish Music Awards	2026	Wishclusive Pop Performance of the Year	Nominated	

== Listicles ==
Publisher	Year	Listicle	Placement	Ref.
Billboard Philippines	2024	The 50 Best Songs of 2024	Placed	
Billboard Philippines	2024	The 50 Best Music Videos of 2024	Placed	
