= Pinoy pop =

Philippine popular music genre

- Other names: P-pop; Philippine pop; Filipino pop; Pilipino pop
- Stylistic origins: Pop; Manila sound; OPM
- Cultural origins: Late 1970s, Philippines
- Typical instruments: Bass; piano; guitar; drums

Other topics
- Pinoy rock; Pinoy hip hop; Pinoy reggae; Visayan pop

Pinoy pop (also known as Philippine pop; an abbreviated form of "Pinoy popular music" or "Philippine popular music"; or P-pop) refers to popular music in the Philippines originating from the OPM genre. With its beginnings in the late 1970s, Pinoy pop is a growing genre in the 2020s. Through the 1990s to the 2000s, Pinoy pop was regularly showcased in the live band scene.

Groups such as Neocolours, Side A, Introvoys, the Teeth, Yano, True Faith, Passage and Freestyle popularized songs that clearly reflect the sentimental character of OPM pop of this era.

From 2010 to 2020, Philippine pop music or Pinoy pop went through a huge metamorphosis in its increased quality, budget, investment and variety, matching the country's rapid economic growth, and an accompanying social and cultural resurgence of its Asian identity. P-Pop emerged with a growing influence of Asian-style ballads, idol groups, and EDM, along with less reliance on Western genres, reflecting its popularity among Generation Z Filipinos and mainstream culture.

== Etymology ==
In the early 1970s, Pinoy music or Pinoy pop emerged, often sung in Tagalog. It was a mix of rock, folk and ballads making political use of music similar to early hip hop but transcending class. The music was a "conscious attempt to create a Filipino national and popular culture" and it often reflected social realities and problems. As early as 1973, the Juan de la Cruz Band was performing "Ang Himig Natin" ("Our Music"), which is widely regarded as the first example of Pinoy rock. "Pinoy" gained popular currency in the late 1970s in the Philippines when a surge in patriotism made a hit song of Filipino folk singer Heber Bartolome's "Tayo'y mga Pinoy" ("We are Pinoys"). This trend was followed by Filipino rapper Francis Magalona's "Mga Kababayan Ko" ("My Countrymen") in the 1990s and Filipino rock band Bamboo's "Noypi" ("Pinoy" in reversed syllables) in the 2000s. Nowadays, Pinoy is used as an adjective to some terms highlighting their relationship to the Philippines or Filipinos. Pinoy rock was soon followed by Pinoy folk and later, Pinoy jazz. Although the music was often used to express opposition to then Philippine president Ferdinand Marcos and his use of martial law and the creating of the Batasang Bayan, many of the songs were more subversive and some just instilled national pride. Perhaps because of the cultural affirming nature and many of the songs seemingly being non-threatening, the Marcos administration ordered radio stations to play at least one – and later, three – Pinoy songs each hour. Pinoy music was greatly employed both by Marcos and political forces who sought to overthrow him.

== History ==
=== 1960s–1970s: Beginnings ===
Filipino pop songs mainly referred to songs popularized since the 1960s, usually sentimental ballads and movie themes. Major 1960s Filipino pop acts include Pilita Corrales and Nora Aunor. 1960s-styled ballads maintained their popularity into the 1970s, led by female balladeers dubbed "jukebox queens" such as Claire dela Fuente, Imelda Papin and Eva Eugenio, and male artists such as Anthony Castelo, Edgar Mortiz and Victor Wood.

In the first half of the 1970s, Manila sound dominated the pop scene, with acts such Hotdog, Cinderella and Sampaguita. Originally influenced by rock-and-roll and bubblegum pop, Manila sound would take influences from funk and disco by the second half of the decade, and acts such as VST & Company, the Boyfriends and Hagibis closely emulated contemporaneous popular foreign artists such as the Bee Gees and the Village People in their performance and visual style.

"Original Pilipino music", commonly known through its abbreviation OPM (which was coined by Danny Javier of Apo Hiking Society), would emerge by the mid-1970s, and originally referred to modern Filipino pop music of the time, primarily ballads, that became popular with the decline of Manila sound. Pioneering acts include Apo Hiking Society, Rey Valera, Freddie Aguilar, Basil Valdez, Rico J. Puno and Hajji Alejandro. Female artists that defined 1970s OPM include Sharon Cuneta (then a teenager) and Leah Navarro. Singer-songwriters Ryan Cayabyab and José Mari Chan rose to fame in the 1970s by composing English OPM love songs alongside modern Tagalog songs.

Radio and music festivals played an important role in the popularization of Filipino music of the time through government or broadcasting industry quotas. In 1973, AM broadcasters were required to play 50% Filipino material for music programming with some exceptions. By 1977, all music broadcasters were required to play one Filipino song every hour. Also in 1977, the Metro Manila Popular Music Festival (Metropop Festival) was launched, drawing both amateur and commercial talent; one of the winning songs included "Anak" by Freddie Aguilar, which would become an international hit. The first iteration of the Metropop Festival would last until 1985.

=== 1980s: Golden age of OPM ===
Sentimental OPM ballads became the predominant form of Filipino pop in the 1980s. The growing number of middle-of-the-road (MOR) or adult contemporary (AC) radio stations in the Philippines, as well as an increase in the Filipino music quota to three songs per hour in 1987 provided OPM more exposure on the airwaves. The decade saw the rise of acts such as Martin Nievera, Ric Segreto, Roel Cortez, Sharon Cuneta, Lea Salonga, Zsa Zsa Padilla, Kuh Ledesma, Donna Cruz, Joey Albert, Raymond Lauchengco, Gary Valenciano, the Company, and Smokey Mountain. 1970s OPM acts such as the Apo Hiking Society and Basil Valdez continued their success into the 1980s.

English-language OPM recordings from both professional and amateur talent also exploded in the 1980s. Non-Tagalog or mixed-heritage (usually Filipino-American) artists such as Jose Mari Chan or Martin Nievera largely recorded OPM songs in English. Acts that largely recorded in Tagalog also began to record original English-language material in the 1980s, such as Basil Valdez with "You", and Apo Hiking Society with "When I Met You" and "Love Is for Singing".

=== 1990s: Prominence of rock and acoustic bands, and new generation of balladeers ===
The early to mid-1990s saw the emergence of the pop-rock group, Eraserheads, considered as a turning-point in the OPM music scene. In the wake of their success was the emergence of a string of influential bands such as Yano, Siakol, Parokya ni Edgar, Grin Department, Rivermaya, Moonstar88 and Hungry Young Poets, each of which mixes the influence of a variety of pop and rock subgenres into their style.

Though rock bands have been dominating the mainstream since their commercialization in the '90s, acoustic groups were still regularly showcased in the live band scene such as Side A, True Faith, Neocolours, South Border and Freestyle who popularized songs that clearly reflect the sentimental character of OPM pop. Popular acoustic acts like Nina, Juris (of MYMP) and Aiza Seguerra also prove the diversity of Filipino pop.

The 1990s would see a new generation of Filipino ballad-oriented acts such as Regine Velasquez, Rachel Alejandro, Ogie Alcasid, Ariel Rivera, Rodel Naval, the April Boys, Jaya, Jessa Zaragoza, Carol Banawa and Jolina Magdangal. Artists such as Velasquez and Jaya would continue their careers into the new millennium. Older established artists such as Gary Valenciano, Martin Nievera, Freddie Aguilar and Jose Mari Chan continued to record new material and have exposure on radio throughout the decade.

=== 2000s – early 2010s: Re-emergence of R&B and novelty songs ===
From the early 2000s onwards, Kyla, Nina and Jay R began to be local pioneers of contemporary R&B. Francis Magalona, Andrew E, Gloc-9, Abra, and Shehyee would pioneer Pinoy hip-hop.

Filipino rock continued to flourish in the 2000s with bands such as Hale, Cueshé, Sponge Cola, Chicosci, Kamikazee and Urbandub, and the emergence of the country's first virtual band, Mistula. Though only some of the spearheading bands are still fully intact, many old members formed new bands such as Pupil, Sandwich, and Bamboo. A few band members such as Kitchie Nadal, Barbie Almalbis, and Rico Blanco established steady solo careers.

Local sing and dance groups SexBomb Girls and Viva Hot Babes began to popularize novelty songs among the masses.

=== 2010s–present: Renaissance ===
Since 2010, the genre of Pinoy pop drastically changed as the usual rock bands and novelty songs from the 1990s and 2000s started to fade out of the mainstream, creating the new pop genre without any influence of rock and hip-hop.

In 2010, Little Big Star 2nd runner-up and YouTube star Charice became the first Asian to peak on the top 10 (at No. 8) of the Billboard 200 with her debut album. She was also one of the first Asian artists to have a song peak at No. 1 on Billboard's Dance/Club Play Songs chart.

Notable pop artists of the 2010s include Toni Gonzaga, Moira Dela Torre, Ben&Ben, Yeng Constantino and Sarah Geronimo whose songs "Tala" and "Kilometro" were chosen by CNN Philippines as best songs of the decade.

=== 2020s: Rise of Pinoy idol groups and new generation of solo artists ===
From the influence of K-pop and J-pop, a new era of Pinoy pop was born as P-pop. The Philippines' first idol group MNL48, a sister group of the J-pop group AKB48, started a new era for Pinoy pop when they debuted in 2018. Following them is the all-boy idol group SB19 who also debuted in 2018. They are the first Filipino act trained by a Korean entertainment company under the same system that catapulted K-pop artists into global stardom. SB19 is considered to be the first Pinoy pop idol group to chart on the Billboard Next Big Sound and Billboard Social 50 charts. On November 20, 2019, SB19 made history by being the first Filipino artist to chart and debut on the Billboard Next Big Sound chart debuting and peaking at No. 5. On December 3, 2019, the group broke the all-time record of the longest stay at the No. 1 spot of the Myx Daily Top 10 with "Go Up" staying at the top spot for 53 non-consecutive days. And on April 29, 2021, SB19 become the first Filipino and Southeast Asian act to be nominated at the Billboard Music Awards for Top Social Artist along with BTS, Blackpink, Ariana Grande, and Seventeen. It marked the first-ever appearance of a Filipino artist at the Billboard Music Awards. SB19's Where You At Tour was one of the first concert tours by a Filipino pop boy band. The tour held 10 shows in the country's major cities and in Dubai, New York, Los Angeles, San Francisco and Singapore.

In May 2020, in the midst of pandemic, Star Hunt Academy led by Laurenti Dyogi introduced new Pinoy pop idol group trainees in public, composed of eight SHA Girls (now collectively known as Bini) and five SHA Boys (now collectively known as BGYO). On January 29, 2021, Star Hunt Academy (SHA) Boys officially debuted as BGYO. A week after the release of their debut single "The Light", BGYO made history for being the fastest Pinoy pop group to reach over a million views on YouTube.

On February 14, 2021, Viva Entertainment introduced their newest P-pop group Alamat with the release of their debut single "Kbye". Formed through Pwede: The National Boyband Search, the group distinguishes itself as a multilingual and multiethnic boy band that sings in seven Philippine languages: Tagalog, Ilocano, Kapampangan, Cebuano, Hiligaynon, Bikolano, and Waray-Waray. Shortly after the release of their debut single, Alamat ranked second on the Pandora Predictions Chart, released on the week of February 23 and they also held the distinction of being the second P-pop group to make it on a Billboard chart and the fastest-rising Pinoy act on the Billboard Next Big Sound chart, debuting at number two. On February 24, their debut single "Kbye" ranked sixth on the Myx Daily Top 10 chart.

On June 11, 2021, Star Hunt Academy (SHA) Girls officially debuted as Bini with their debut album Born to Win. Versions in Indonesian, Japanese, Thai, and Spanish were also included on the album. The current members are Jhoanna, Colet, Maloi, Aiah, Stacey, Gwen, Mikha, and Sheena. In June 2024, Bini became the first Filipino artist to top Spotify's Daily Top Artists Philippines chart, surpassing Taylor Swift.

The 2020s also gave the Pinoy pop scene a new generation of young solo artists. In March 2021, singer-songwriter Zack Tabudlo released his single "Binibini", garnering 18.3 million streams on Spotify which became the top song on the said service's local Philippines chart for two consecutive months in April and May.

In October 2021, Arthur Nery gained fame when his best-selling single "Pagsamo" became the top-streaming song on Spotify's Daily Top 50 chart, gaining over 200,000 streams for its lyric video on YouTube for the first 12 hours.

== Culture ==
=== Single promotion and comebacks ===
For many years and in today's rise of Pinoy pop, the Philippine music channel Myx ranks songs on various charts like the Myx Daily Top 10, Pinoy Myx Countdown and Myx Hit Chart. Pinoy pop also has comeback stages such as ASAP and It's Showtime on ABS-CBN, All-Out Sundays on GMA Network, Eat Bulaga! on TV5, and Wowowin on All TV. They also perform at mall shows to promote their music throughout the Philippines and around the world.

=== Awards shows ===
Awards shows like the Wish 107.5 Music Awards and MYX Music Awards are held annually to recognize the contributions of local artists in the Philippines.

== International recognition ==
In 2010, the self-titled album of Charice (now known as Jake Zyrus) debuted at number eight on the Billboard 200, making Zyrus the first Asian solo artist to reach the top 10 on the chart. The album's lead single, "Pyramid", featuring Iyaz, reached number 17 on the UK Singles Chart, making Zyrus the first Filipino singer to have a top 20 single in the UK.

In 2015, Alden Richards' self-titled debut EP Alden Richards landed on the Billboard World Albums Chart at number 10 for the week of October 17, 2015.

In 2017, Morissette was directly hand-picked by the organization of the Korean Asia Song Festival. She lined up to perform with some of the top K-pop groups in Korea, including EXO and MAMAMOO, to name a few. She was invited to sing again at the Asia Song Festival in 2018. Morissette is the only Filipino musician to be invited to this event twice in a row to represent the Philippines. She sang a Korean song ("Resignation"), making her version by transposing the words into English and singing the concluding section of the song in Hangul (Korean language).

In 2019, Pinoy pop idol group MNL48 performed at AKB48 Group Asia Festival 2019, the first held in Bangkok, Thailand on January 27, while the second one was held in Shanghai, China on August 24. Such performances catapulted MNL48 to the international stage, especially with other fans of their 48G counterparts. That same year, MNL48's Abby Trinidad was the group's representative on the New Year's Eve special of NHK's Kohaku Uta Gassen, where along with other 48G counterparts, performed "Koi Soru Fortune Cookie". This is the third time a Filipino performer appeared on the said show, alongside Gary Valenciano and the band Smokey Mountain.

In 2020, Sarah Geronimo's single "Tala" entered at No. 12 on the U.S. Billboard World Digital Song Sales chart. Its accompanying music video also reached the 100 million mark on YouTube, a first for a female Filipino solo artist. The same year, Forbes named her as one of the most powerful celebrities in the Asia–Pacific region citing her efforts on COVID-19 charitable activities. A year later, Tatler Asia named her as one of the region's most influential figures.

In 2020, Pinoy pop boy band SB19 became a Billboard Social 50 mainstay after peaking at No. 15 on the chart, likely due to the music video of their single "Alab". SB19 reached their highest position on the weekly Billboard Social 50 list two weeks after the release of their album, ranking second behind BTS on the week of August 15, 2020. A week later, by placing in the top five of two charts, the group achieved another Billboard milestone: 5th on the Emerging Artist list, their highest ranking to date, while staying 2nd on the Social 50 chart. On the week of October 31, 2020, SB19's "Go Up" peaked at number 2 on Billboard's LyricFind Global chart after debuting at number 17 the week before, while also making its initial appearance at number 9 on the U.S. version of the chart. Two weeks after, "Hanggang sa Huli" debuted at number 16 on Billboard's LyricFind U.S. chart while also debuting at number 4 on the chart's global version. On the week of November 28, 2020, the group reached another milestone, their first number 1 on a Billboard chart, after "Alab (Burning)" debuted at number 1 on Billboard's LyricFind Global chart, and at number 6 on the U.S. version of the chart.

On January 31, two days after their debut, Star Magic's newest P-pop boy band BGYO was featured by EXO Baekhyun's Privé Alliance on the streetwear line's social media accounts, becoming the first P-pop group to ever be featured by the clothing line.

On April 29, 2021, SB19 became the first Filipino group and Southeast Asian act to make it to the final list of the Billboard Music Awards for Top Social Artist along with BTS, Blackpink, Ariana Grande, and Seventeen. It is also the first nomination for a Filipino artist at the Billboard Music Awards. In November 25, their single "Bazainga" entered the Billboard Hot Trending Songs chart, becoming the first Filipino act to do so. It later climbed to No. 1, a first for any South-east Asian act. The song also managed to surpassed BTS' "Butter" for spending the most weeks at No. 1 on the said chart. In 2022, Teen Vogue named them as one of the "Favorite Boy Bands of All Time" alongside the Beatles and One Direction.

In June 2023, the song "GENTO" by SB19 was the first entry on two of Billboard's record charts: World Digital Song Sales—a first among Filipino groups—and the Philippines Songs charts, peaking at numbers eight and eleven, respectively.

In July 2023, Hori7on made history as the first all-Filipino act to debut in South Korea.

At the 2023 Asia Artist Awards (AAA), both SB19 and Hori7on attended and won awards, making them the first Filipino acts to be included in the AAA lineup when the event was held in the Philippines. Hori7on received the Focus Award in Music, while SB19 won the Hot Trend Award and the Best Artist Award (Singer). The two groups were also part of a historic night for Filipino talent at the event held at the Philippine Arena.

In January 2024, Hori7on became the first Filipino act to perform and headline an official Olympic ceremony when they appeared at the Gangwon 2024 Winter Youth Olympics.

In June 2024, Bini entered the Top Artists Global chart on Spotify, reaching 193rd place.

In March 2024, four years after "Tala" entered a Billboard chart, Sarah Geronimo became the first homegrown Filipino artist to receive a Billboard Women in Music award in the United States. Geronimo along with Annalisa of Italy and Luísa Sonza of Brazil were the inaugural recipients of the Global Force Award. The same month, Geronimo was named Woman of the Year at the Billboard Philippines Women in Music event while Bini received the Rising Star award.

On March 11, 2025, SB19's "DAM" debuted at No. 1 on the Billboard World Digital Song Sales chart, making the P-pop group as the first Filipino act to do so. "DAM" is the second SB19 song to appear on the chart, following their hit "GENTO", which debuted and peaked on the chart at No. 8 during the week of June 3, 2023.

On April 15, 2025, Cup of Joe's single "Multo" (lit. ''Ghost'') became the first song by a Filipino act to enter the Billboard Global 200, peaking at No. 80. It was released on September 14, 2024 as the lead single from their debut album Silakbo (lit. ''Outburst'') (2025). The song topped the Billboard Philippines Hot 100 for ten weeks, making it the longest song to remain at No. 1, surpassing Dionela's "Marilag" (transl. "Majesty"), which held the position for eight consecutive weeks. In 2025, the band also entered the Spotify Global Top Artists chart at No. 182.

In 2026, Hori7on were nominated for the Popularity Award and the K-pop World Choice – Group Award at the 35th Seoul Music Awards.It marked the first time a Filipino act was nominated in the prestigious awards ceremony.

In November 2026, Bini and SB19 made history as the first P-pop groups and first homegrown Filipino acts in general to be nominated at the 69th Annual Grammy Awards.

== Artist(s) ==
Some of the most notable P-pop artists who have made significant local and international milestones include soloists Sarah Geronimo, Nadine Lustre, James Reid, Maymay Entrata, KZ Tandingan, Iñigo Pascual, Maki and groups such as SB19, Bini, BGYO, Hori7on and Alamat.

== See also ==
- Culture of the Philippines
- List of Philippine-based music groups
- Music of the Philippines
- Manila sound
- Pinoy hip hop
- Pinoy rock
- Original Pilipino Music
- Rondalla
- PPOPCON
