= Cup of Joe (band) =

Filipino pop rock band

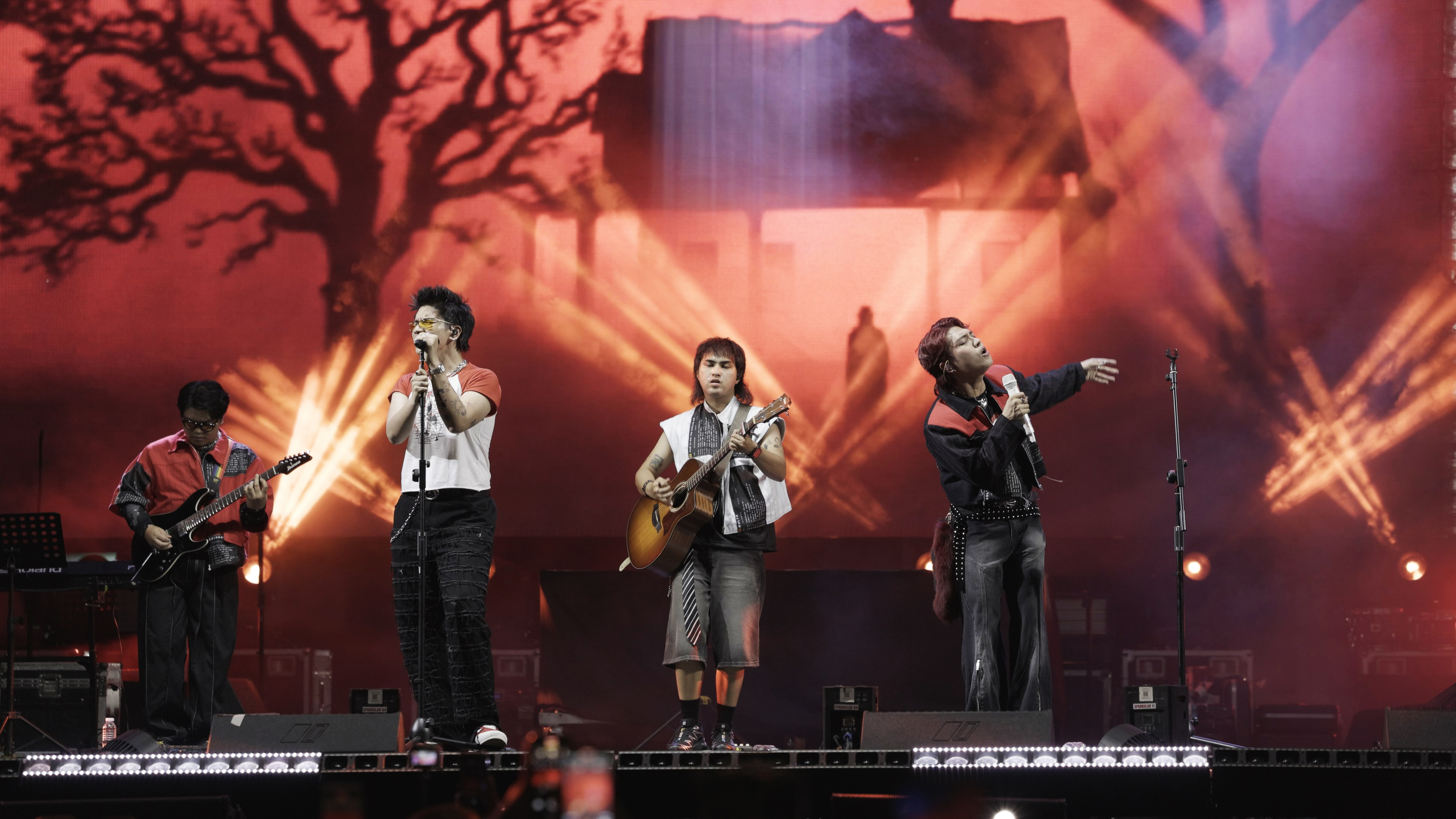
- Cup of Joe performing at the Aurora Music Festival in 2025

Background information
- Origin: Baguio, Philippines
- Genres: Alternative rock; indie pop; pop rock
- Years active: 2018–present
- Label: Viva Records
- Members: Gabriel Fernandez; Gian Bernardino; Raphaell Ridao; CJ Fernandez; Xen Gareza
- Past members: Raphael Severino

Cup of Joe is a Filipino pop rock band based in Baguio formed in November 2018, and signed with Viva Records in 2019. The band's lineup consists of lead vocalists Gian Bernardino and Raphaell Ridao, lead guitarist Gabriel Fernandez, rhythm guitarist CJ Fernandez, and keyboardist Xen Gareza, while bassist Raphael Severino departed in June 2024 after five years with the band. They released the song "Tingin" (lit. 'Look') with Janine Teñoso as part of their debut extended play (EP), Patutunguhan (lit. 'Destination') (2023). The group entered the Billboard Philippines Songs chart with the track.

In 2023, the band topped the Spotify Philippines' Daily Top OPM Groups chart, surpassing Ben&Ben, which had held the position for over a year. They also ranked second on the Daily Top OPM Artists chart and entered the top ten of the Top Artists chart on the platform, reaching number eight.

Cup of Joe's single "Multo" (lit. 'Ghost') became the first song by a Filipino act to enter the Billboard Global 200, peaking at No. 80. Released on September 14, 2024, as the lead single from their debut album, Silakbo (lit. 'Outburst') (2025). The song topped the Billboard Philippines Hot 100 for 33 non-consecutive weeks, making it the longest song to remain at number one, surpassing Dionela's "Marilag" (lit. 'Majesty'), which held the position for eight consecutive weeks. In 2025, the band also entered the Spotify Global Top Artists chart at No. 182.

== Name ==
Logo of the band since 2023.

The band chose the name "Cup of Joe" spontaneously when they needed a name for an event. Lead guitarist Gabriel Fernandez suggested the name without any specific inspiration. Over time, the name gained meaning, as "Cup of Joe", a slang term for coffee, came to reflect the band's relaxed music style. The name also resonates with their connection to Baguio, a city known for its cool climate and laid-back atmosphere. The term "Joe" symbolizes an ordinary person, reflecting the band's identity as students who are eager to share their music.

== History ==
=== 2018–2019: Early years and signing under Viva Records ===
Cup of Joe was formed in November 2018 during their senior year at Saint Louis University Laboratory High School in Baguio. The group began in August 2018 when Gian Bernardino and Raphaell Ridao, after being invited to perform at their school's Buwan ng Wika (National Language Month) celebration, they decided to form a band and began looking for other members. One of the first to join was Gabriel Fernandez from Pangasinan, who had previously played in a band called Pink Soda with Ridao when they were in 11th grade. They met their future bandmates CJ Fernandez (also from Pangasinan), Raphael Severino from Isabela, and Xen Gareza from Abra in the lobby of their school building, where Bernardino introduced himself and helped bring the group together. Their first proper rehearsal took place at the house of their original drummer, Elian Akia.

In 2019, less than a year after forming, Cup of Joe signed with Viva Records. The band began performing more widely. Originally, they played at community events, school music festivals, and private parties around Baguio, covering popular songs. Eventually, they started creating their own music, which led to the release of their song "Nag-iisang Muli" (lit. 'Alone Again'), which earned them the Best Regional Song trophy at the 2019 MOR Awards and a nomination for Best Recording by a New Group at the Awit Awards. The band released the track "Alas Dose" (Twelve O'clock) on November 8, 2019, which became popular during the Christmas season.

=== 2020–2024: Patutunguhan and Severino's departure ===
In 2020, the band released the songs "Sagada" and "Hayaan" (lit. 'Let It Be'). Punch Liwanag, a music critic from Manila Bulletin, praised both tracks as mid-tempo ballads that emphasize the band's alt-pop style. "Sagada" in particular, resonated with listeners due to its "lilting" quality and themes of catharsis.

In 2021, they released "Bukod Tangi" (Unique), a jazzy, new wave-flavored single that drew comparisons to the sound of Truefaith. Originally intended for the 2019 film Unforgettable starring Sarah Geronimo. Although it was not included in the film's official soundtrack, the band cited Geronimo's character, Jasmine, as the inspiration behind the song. They described the song as having catchy choruses and a new wave-inspired sound. This was followed by "Ikaw Pa Rin Ang Pipiliin Ko" (lit. 'I Will Still Choose You'), a folk-pop version that marked the band's shift toward a neo-folk sound. Originally written and released by Marion Aunor in 2018, Cup of Joe reinterpreted the song by shifting its arrangement from a dark, piano-driven ballad featuring upbeat drums and violin riffs.

In 2022, the band released two singles, "Mananatili" (lit. 'Will Remain'), and "Estranghero" (lit. 'Stranger'), which further solidified their connection with their expanding fan base. These tracks showcased a more refined sound and style, drawing inspiration from 1980s and 1990s pop music.

In 2023, the band released their debut EP, Patutunguhan (lit. 'Direction'), which was featured on Billboard Philippines' list of top albums and EPs of 2023. The song "Tingin" (lit. 'Look') debuted on the Billboard's Philippines Songs Chart at number 25. By December 11, it had reached its peak position at number six. Cup of Joe and Janine Teñoso's performance of "Tingin" on the Wish 107.5 Bus was uploaded on July 17 to YouTube, where it garnered over one million views.

In February 2024, Cup of Joe held their first solo concert, titled "Cup of Joe: Seatbelts On!", at the New Frontier Theater on February 9 and 10. The event was presented by Viva Live Inc. On March 22, Cup of Joe announced their participation at the grand debut album concert of their fellow OPM rock band, Lola Amour, which took place on April 13.

On June 26, the band announced on X that Sevi was amicably leaving the band after five years without providing a reason for his departure. On August 2, Cup of Joe released the music video for their hit song "Misteryoso" (lit. 'Mysterious'), starring Jhoanna from Bini and directed by Justin of SB19.

On September 6, Cup of Joe announced a special four-part project titled "DOS: The Sixth JOEnniversary Special" to celebrate their sixth anniversary. The announcement was made through the band's social media platforms, unveiling a series of events that would take place throughout September. In December, Cup of Joe was recognized by Spotify as its Top 3 Group and Top 3 Local Group in the Philippines for 2024.

=== 2025–present: Silakbo and Sandali ===
On January 17, Cup of Joe released their debut studio album Silakbo (lit. 'Outburst'), which explores the five stages of grief: denial, anger, bargaining, depression, and acceptance. One of the album's tracks, "Multo" (lit. 'Ghost'), had previously been released as a single on September 14, 2024.

The band began their second major concert, also titled Silakbo, in February, with a performance at the Araneta Coliseum. The concert paid tribute to their roots in Baguio, featuring stage visuals of pine trees and throwback sets under their alter egos Pink Penoy Club and Pink Soda. During the concert, the band briefly split into two groups for special performances: Gian Bernardino, Xen Gareza, and CJ Fernandez performed as Pink Penoy Club, covering Eraserheads songs such as "Alapaap", "Pare Ko," and "Ang Huling El Bimbo," in tribute to classic OPM. Bernardino, Gareza, and CJ Fernandez, apart from being college roommates, were also the last members to complete the band lineup. Meanwhile, Ridao and Gab Fernandez reunited as Pink Soda, performing songs by Australian band 5 Seconds of Summer, including "Heartbreak Girl" and "She Looks So Perfect", the latter featuring guest singer Maki. They concluded their set with Maki's own track, "Namumula" on day 1. Other guest performers included Keanna Mag and Janine Teñoso and surprise guest artist KZ Tandingan on day 2. Cup of Joe concluded with an encore of "Mananatili" after "Silakbo".

At the inauguration of The Official Philippines Chart on February 19, Cup of Joe was recognized as its top four Local Artist of the Year, while "Tingin" was recognized as its top nine Local Song of the Year. In April 2025, "Multo" entered the Billboard Global 200 chart, placing at 181st place. According to Elijah Pareño of Rolling Stone Philippines, "Multo" established Cup of Joe as "serious pop storytellers".

The band also performed at the REV Music Festival during UP Fair, a student-led event advocating against gender-related violence, discrimination, and promoting LGBTQ+ rights, where they headlined alongside Ben&Ben, Yeng Constantino, and Morissette. The band returned to the Aurora Music Festival in Clark, Pampanga for the third time on May 3 and 4, delivering an emotional and well-received set. They were among the headliners on the second day of the festival, performing alongside girl group Bini.

In June, the band's lead vocalists Bernardino and Ridao performed at Lov3laban, a Pride Month celebration. In July, Cup of Joe announced that they would hold their third major concert, titled Stardust, at the Araneta Coliseum on October 10–11. Tickets for the concert were sold out within a day of their release. An overseas tour, also titled Stardust was later announced, spanning multiple cities in the United States and Canada from October to November. Later that month, they were listed as performers at the Aurora Music Festival in Cebu, which is scheduled for November 22.

In September, the band released a new single, "Sandali", to commemorate their seventh anniversary.

At the kick off concert of the "Stardust" tour in October, Cup of Joe performed several of their prominent singles with all five of the band members covering surprise songs and performing with surprise guest artists.

On day 1, the five members covered Goo Goo Dolls' "Iris" as their surprise song. Gloc-9 also performed Parokya ni Edgar's "Bagsakan," with Gian Bernardino as Chito Miranda and Rapha Ridao as Francis M.
On day 2, the five members covered One Direction's "Night Changes" as their surprise song. Apo Hiking Society's Jim Paredes and Boboy Garovillo performed a medley of "Panalangin" and "Alas Dose."
On day 3, the five members covered Backstreet Boys' "I Want It That Way" as their surprise song, while Yeng Constantino performed her "Jeepney Love Story."

The band then concluded with an encore of "Patutunguhan" after "Multo".

On October 17, the band released their live album Silakbo (Live), and features live recordings from their second solo concert in Araneta Coliseum, supporting their debut album Silakbo, and consists of 22 tracks. The band performed at the Coca-Cola Arena in Dubai on November 29, as part of the "Stardust" tour. Additional stops were announced for 2026 in Santa Rosa, Laguna and Tacloban.

In December, Cup of Joe was designated by Billboard Philippines as the leading artist of 2025. They were also designated by Spotify Philippines as both the Top Local Artist and Top Local Group of 2025, while "Multo" and "Tingin" were included among the Top Local Songs of the year, placing first and seventh respectively. "Multo" was also recognized by Apple Music Philippines as its Top OPM Song of 2025, while "Tingin" and "Misteryoso" also placed seventh and 10th respectively on the said list.

In 2026, "Multo" reached over 500 million streams on Spotify, making it the most-streamed OPM song of all time, surpassing the record previously held by Up Dharma Down's "Tadhana".

In May, the band released their second extended play (EP), titled Sandali on May 1, three weeks ahead of their concert with the same name on the 23. The band took the stage for "Sandali: The Cup of Joe Fest" at the Philippine Sports Stadium in Bulacan, becoming the first OPM act to host a solo concert at the venue. They performed songs from their new EP "Sandali", along with their top hits, surprise guest artists, infamous guest artists, and solo performances.

Kamikazee opened as front act playing "Unang Tikim", "Halik", "Unang Sayaw", and "Doo Bi Doo" for the concert. Bamboo Mañalac performed "Hallelujah" and "Kisapmata". Jay Contreras of Kamikazee performed "Narda", after that the five members stood on a rubber duck cart that was pushed around the track as they sang to "Wag Na Lang" and used water guns. The band then held individual solo stages during the middle of the concert.

"Gab" Fernandez sang Justin Bieber's "One Time" and "One Less Lonely Girl".
"Rapha" Ridao played guitar and sang All Time Low's "Dear Maria, Count Me In" and Jonas Brothers' "Burnin' Up".
"CJ" Fernandez rapped Al James' "Pahinga" and "Repeat" while Al James walked onto the stage as a surprise in the middle of "Pahinga" and sang the rest of the song and "Repeat" with CJ.
"Xen" Gareza sang Coldplay's "Yellow"
"Edgar" Gian Bernardino with surprise guest artists Will Ashley and Maki sang Michael Bublé's version of "Feeling Good".

After the solo stages, they brought back Pink Penoy Club with Ridao and Gab Fernandez covering 5SOS' "Voodoo Doll" while Pink Soda returned with Bernardino, CJ Fernandez, and Gareza covering The Itchyworms' "Beer". Ely Buendia then performed "Alapaap" and "Ang Huling El Bimbo". Cup of Joe then played seven songs before "Multo" and topping off with an encore of "Tataya" and "Sinderela", a jump in a swimming pool in front of the T stage, and a fireworks display.

On July 24, they posted a gig tour called "Sandali Sessions", which is promoting their new Sandali EP with five locations that will be revealed one after another.

Stage	Date(s)	Venue	Location
Unang Yugto (First Stage)	August 7	Viva Cafe	Araneta Center, QC
Ikalawang Yugto (Second Stage)	August 28	Backyard Warehouse Studio	Quezon City
Ikatlong Yugto (Third Stage)	September 6	123 Block	Mandaluyong City
Ikaapat Yugto: Halloween special (Fourth Stage)	October 30	Central Plaza	Eastwood City, QC
Ikalimang Yugto (Fifth Stage)	December 3—4	Araneta Coliseum	Araneta Center, QC

They announced during their "Ikatlong Yugto" (Third Stage) of "Sandali Sessions" that they will have a fifth major solo concert and their third major concert in the Araneta Coliseum, titled "Cup of Joe: Symphony | LIVE AT THE BIG DOME" with the Orchestra of the Filipino Youth on December 3, 2026. The tickets for all categories sold out within 12 hours of selling. They added December 4 show due to demand.

On October 9, they held their last Stardust show in Perth, thus closing their one year tour starting from the Araneta Coliseum to North America, the UAE, Singapore, the Philippines, and Australia. Three weeks after, during "Cup of Joe: Halloween special" or "Sandali Sessions: Ikaapat Yugto" (Fourth Stage), the band announced a temporary hiatus after their "Cup of Joe: Symphony" concert at the Araneta Coliseum scheduled on December 3 to 4. Aside the December 4 hiatus, they are scheduled perform at previously announced events, a concert on December 11 with Bamboo in Dubai's Coca-Cola Arena and a music festival on December 12 at the JBL Soundfest 2026 in Bridgetowne, Pasig.

== Artistry ==
=== Musical style and themes ===
"Misteryoso"
A sample of the chorus of "Misteryoso", an upbeat love song about someone hoping for their love interest to notice them. Producer, Shadiel Chan shared in a press statement that the song was created to fuse classic OPM with modern pop, featuring "ear-tickling elements in unexpected parts of the song" along with a "fairytale-like atmosphere".

Cup of Joe defines their sound as "experimental", blending various genres including acoustic pop, retro, and alternative pop. They also incorporate elements of retro-wave and neo-folk into their music. The band are deeply influenced by their environment in Baguio. Gian Bernardino noted that their single, "Nag-iisang Muli", was inspired by the scenic surroundings where they began writing the song. Raphaell Ridao initiated the songwriting process with the line "Kay lamig ng simoy ng hangin" ("The breeze is so cold"), reflecting the cool breeze of Baguio. Bernardino stated that the creative atmosphere in Baguio has inspired the band, as well as other artists, to write and compose songs.

According to Bernardino, the themes of their songs differ from current trends, as the band took a creative risk by focusing mostly on a positive direction in love. Departing from the usual heartbreak narratives, they aimed to create love songs with a more uplifting and hopeful tone. Carissa Alcantara of Billboard Philippines wrote that Cup of Joe have found a way to turn poetry into music that speaks to universal experiences, noting that whether it's about heartbreak, falling in love, or hope, the six-piece act continues to reinvent familiar stories.

=== Influences ===
Gian Bernardino cites Eraserheads, Rivermaya, and Apo Hiking Society as key influences from the OPM (Original Pinoy Music) scene. Among international artists, he draws inspiration from Olivia Rodrigo, Chappell Roan, Harry Styles, and Benson Boone. He identifies OPM icon KZ Tandingan as his most significant influence. Cup of Joe's influences include Ben&Ben, This Band, and Eraserheads. Bernardino expressed the band's desire to collaborate with Ben&Ben, whom Raphaell Ridao identified as their main influence within the OPM scene, citing their "unique" and "distinctive sound".

Cup of Joe expressed pride in seeing fellow bands from Baguio, making a name for themselves. The band denied the notion of competition between bands, with CJ Fernandez emphasizing their unity as musicians. Fernandez also mentioned their pride in representing Baguio, highlighting the achievements of bands like Dilaw and their mutual support. Xen Gareza noted that Baguio's music scene has "always been rich", attributing its recent exposure to social media and word of mouth, and cited bands like Dilaw and SunKissed Lola as examples. Bernardino also shared that the atmosphere in Baguio has been a source of inspiration for their songwriting and compositions.

== Band members ==
=== Current members ===
- Edgar Gian Bernardino – lead vocals; arranger (2018–present)
- Raphaell "Rapha" Ridao – lead vocals; arranger (2018–present)
- Vixen Zhaesar "Xen" Gareza – keyboards; sub vocals, arranger (2018–present)
- Antonio Gabriel "Gab" Fernandez – lead guitar; sub vocals, arranger (2018–present)
- Clint Joules "CJ" Fernandez – rhythm guitar; sub vocals, arranger (2018–present)

=== Session and touring musicians ===
- Moon Cairo Peralta – drums; co–producer and co–arranger (2018–present)
- Shadiel "Shady" Chan – bass guitar; producer and arranger (2020–present)
- Abner Badua – lead guitar; co–producer and co–arranger (2022–present)

=== Former members ===
- Raphael "Sevi" Severino – bass guitar; arranger (2018–2024)

== Accolades ==
Award	Year	Category	Recipient(s)	Result	Ref.
Aliw Awards	2025	Best Director for a Major Concert	Paolo Valenciano (Stardust)	Nominated	
Awit Awards	2023	Breakthrough Artist of the Year	Cup of Joe	Nominated	
Awit Awards	2023	Favorite Song	"Estranghero"	Nominated	
Awit Awards	2023	Favorite Group Artist	Cup of Joe	Nominated	
Awit Awards	2025	Song of the Year	"Misteryoso"	Won	
Awit Awards	2025	Best Cover Art	"Misteryoso"	Nominated	
Awit Awards	2026	Album of the Year	Silakbo	Nominated	
Awit Awards	2026	Best Sound Engineered Recording	Silakbo	Nominated	
Awit Awards	2026	Dangal ng Musikang Pilipino - Global Impact Award	Cup of Joe	Won	
Filipino Music Awards	2025	People’s Choice Awards: Artist	Cup of Joe	Nominated	
Filipino Music Awards	2025	People’s Choice Awards: Song	"Multo"	Nominated	
Filipino Music Awards	2025	Album of the Year	Silakbo	Won	
Filipino Music Awards	2025	Concert of the Year	Silakbo	Nominated	
Filipino Music Awards	2025	Song of the Year	"Multo"	Won	
Filipino Music Awards	2025	Artist of the Year	Cup of Joe	Nominated	
Filipino Music Awards	2026	People's Choice Awards: Song	"Sandali"	Nominated	
Filipino Music Awards	2026	Tour of the Year	Stardust	Nominated	
Filipino Music Awards	2026	Concert of the Year	Sandali: The Cup of Joe Fest	Nominated	
Filipino Music Awards	2026	Alternative Song of the Year	"Sandali"	Nominated	
Filipino Music Awards	2026	Artist of the Year	Cup of Joe	Nominated	
MOR Pinoy Music Awards	2019	Best Regional Song	"Nag-iisang Muli"	Won	
MOR Pinoy Music Awards	2019	Best Performance by a New Group Recording Artist	Cup of Joe	Nominated	
Myx Music Awards	2024	Breakout Group of the Year	Cup of Joe	Won	
Myx Music Awards	2024	Rock Video of the Year	"Misteryoso"	Nominated	
New Hue Video Music Awards	2024	Group Artist of the Year	Cup of Joe	Won	
New Hue Video Music Awards	2025	Vocalist of the Year	Gian and Rapha	Won	
P-pop Music Awards	2024	Production Design in a Music Video	"Misteryoso"	Nominated	
P-pop Music Awards	2024	Breakthrough Artist of the Year	Cup of Joe	Nominated	
P-pop Music Awards	2025	Artist of the Year	Cup of Joe	Won	
P-pop Music Awards	2025	Song of the Year	"Multo"	Nominated	
PMPC Star Awards for Music	2026	Song of the Year	"Multo"	Nominated	
PMPC Star Awards for Music	2026	Duo/Group Artist of the Year	"Multo"	Nominated	
PMPC Star Awards for Music	2026	Concert of the Year	Seatbelts On!	Nominated	
PMPC Star Awards for Music	2026	Duo/Group Concert Performer of the Year	Seatbelts On!	Nominated	
PMPC Star Awards for Music	2026	Music Video of the Year	"Misteryoso"	Nominated	
VP Choice Awards	2026	Group Performer of the Year	Cup of Joe	Nominated	
VP Choice Awards	2026	OPM Song of the Year	"Pahina"	Nominated	
Wish Music Awards	2023	Wish Song Collaboration of the Year	"Tingin"	Won	
Wish Music Awards	2025	Wishclusive Contemporary Folk Performance of the Year	"Ikaw Pa Rin Ang Pipiliin Ko"	Won	
Wish Music Awards	2025	Wish Group of the Year	Cup of Joe	Nominated	
Wish Music Awards	2026	Wishclusive Pop Performance of the Year	"Misteryoso"	Nominated	
Wish Music Awards	2026	Wishclusive Rock/Alternative Performance of the Year	"Multo"	Won	
Wish Music Awards	2026	Wishclusive Rock/Alternative Song of the Year	"Multo"	Won	
Wish Music Awards	2026	Wish Group of the Year	Cup of Joe	Won	
Zeenfluential Awards	2025	Zeenfluential Music Artist	Cup of Joe	Won	

== Listicles ==
Publisher	Year	Listicle	Placement	Ref.
Billboard Philippines	2024	The 50 Best Songs of 2024	Placed ("Misteryoso")	
Billboard Philippines	2024	The 50 Best Music Videos of 2024	Placed ("Misteryoso")	
Billboard Philippines	2025	13 Halloween Costume Ideas Inspired by Your Favorite OPM Artists	Placed ("Gian Bernardino")	
Billboard Philippines	2025	10 OPM Songs for Reflection and New Beginnings	Placed ("Multo")	
Billboard Philippines	2025	Favorite Albums of 2025	Placed (Silakbo)	
Billboard Philippines	2025	Favorite Songs of 2025	Placed ("Pahina")	
Billboard Philippines	2025	25 Best Filipino Albums And EPs of 2025	Placed (Silakbo)	
Billboard Philippines	2025	7 Filipino Songs to Kickstart your New Year Right	Placed ("Sandali")	
Manila Bulletin	2025	Favorite OPM albums of 2025	Placed (Silakbo)	

== Discography ==
=== Studio albums ===
List of studio albums, with release date, label, and format shown
Title	Details	Ref.
Silakbo	Released: January 17, 2025; Label: Viva Records; Format: digital download, streaming	

=== Live albums ===
List of live albums, with release date, label, and format shown
Title	Details	Ref.
Silakbo (Live)	Released: October 17, 2025; Label: Viva Records; Format: digital download, streaming	

=== Extended plays ===
List of extended plays, with release date, label, and format shown
Title	Details	Ref.
Patutunguhan	Released: June 30, 2023; Label: Viva Records; Format: digital download, streaming	
Sandali	Released: May 1, 2026; Label: Viva Records; Format: digital download, streaming	

=== Singles ===
List of singles by Cup of Joe, showing year released as single, selected chart positions, and associated albums
Title	Year	Peak chart positions							Album
Title	Year	PHL	PHL Top	PHL IFPI	NLD Glob.	SGP Reg.	UAE	WW	Album
"Nag-iisang Muli"	2019	—	—	—	—	—	—	—	Non-album singles
"Sinderela"	2019	—	—	—	—	—	—	—	Non-album singles
"Alas Dose"	2019	—	—	—	—	—	—	—	Non-album singles
"Sagada"	2020	—	—	—	—	—	—	—	Non-album singles
"Hayaan"	2020	—	—	—	—	—	—	—	Non-album singles
"Bukod-Tangi"	2021	—	—	—	—	—	—	—	Non-album singles
"Ikaw Pa Rin Ang Pipiliin Ko"	2021	52	—	—	—	—	—	—	Non-album singles
"Mananatili"	2022	—	—	—	—	—	—	—	Patutunguhan
"Estranghero"	2022	30	18	—	—	—	—	—	Patutunguhan
"Tataya"	2023	—	—	—	—	—	—	—	Patutunguhan
"Tingin" (with Janine Teñoso)	2023	4	5	7	—	—	—	—	Patutunguhan
"Lahat ng Bukas" (with Keanna Mag)	2024	—	—	—	—	—	—	—	Non-album singles
"Misteryoso"	2024	13	8	14	—	—	—	—	Non-album singles
"Multo"	2024	1	1	1	18	16	10	80	Silakbo
"Sandali"	2025	49	—	—	—	—	—	—	Sandali
"—" denotes releases that did not chart or were not released in that region.

==== Other charted songs ====
List of songs by Cup of Joe, showing year released, selected chart positions, and associated albums
Title	Year	Peak chart positions		Album
Title	Year	PHL	PHL Top	Album
"Patutunguhan"	2023	94	–	Patutunguhan
"Pahina"	2025	33	14	Silakbo
"—" denotes releases that did not chart or were not released in that region.

== Filmography ==
=== Television ===
Year	Title	Ref.
2024	I Can See Your Voice Philippines	
2024–2025	ASAP	
2025	Rainbow Rumble	

=== Music videos ===
List of music videos as lead artist, showing year released and directors
Title	Year	Director(s)	Ref.
"Nag-iisang Muli"	2019	Carlo Alvarez	
"Alas Dose"	2019	—	
"Estranghero"	2022	Vj Catacutan	
"Mananatili"	2022	Vj Catacutan	
"Tataya"	2023	Jefferson Hao	
"Tingin"	2023	Jay-Ar Villarojas	
"Misteryoso"	2024	Justin de Dios	
"Lahat ng Bukas"	2024	Miguel Antonio Sonza	
"Multo"	2025	Kris Cazin	

== Concerts and tours ==
=== Headlining concerts ===
List of headlining concerts, showing dates, venues, and locations
Title	Date(s)	Venue	City / Municipality	Country	Ref.
Cup of Joe: Seatbelts On!	February 9–10, 2024	New Frontier Theater	Quezon City	Philippines	
Silakbo	February 8–9, 2025	Smart Araneta Coliseum	Quezon City	Philippines	
Stardust	October 10–12, 2025	Smart Araneta Coliseum	Quezon City	Philippines	
Sandali: The Cup of Joe Fest	May 23, 2026	Philippine Sports Stadium	Bocaue	Philippines	
Cup of Joe: Symphony	December 3–4, 2026	Smart Araneta Coliseum	Quezon City	Philippines	

=== International tours ===
List of international tours, showing dates, venues, and locations
Tour title	Date(s)	Venue	City	Country	Ref.
Stardust	October 31, 2025	Saban Theatre	Beverly Hills, LA	United States	
Stardust	November 1–2, 2025	Graton Resort & Casino	Santa Rosa	United States	
Stardust	November 7, 2025	Chinese Cultural Centre	Calgary	Canada	
Stardust	November 8, 2025	Edmonton Expo Centre	Edmonton	Canada	
Stardust	November 14, 2025	Transcona Country Club	Winnipeg	Canada	
Stardust	November 15, 2025	Chandos Pattison Auditorium	Vancouver	Canada	
Stardust	November 16, 2025	Pickering Casino Resort	Toronto	Canada	
Stardust	November 29, 2025	Coca-Cola Arena	Dubai	United Arab Emirates	
Stardust	February 14, 2026 (cancelled)*	Qatar National Convention Centre	Doha	Qatar	
Stardust	March 8, 2026	Singapore Expo	Singapore	Singapore	
Stardust	April 24, 2026	Bal Theater	San Leandro	United States	
Stardust	April 25, 2026	Saban Theatre	Beverly Hills, LA	United States	
Stardust	May 1, 2026	Melrose Ballroom	Long Island City, NYC	United States	
Stardust	October 3, 2026	Enjoy Venues	Melbourne	Australia	
Stardust	October 5, 2026	The Concourse, Chatswood	Sydney	Australia	
Stardust	October 9, 2026	Metro City	Perth	Australia	

* Doha was cancelled due to lack of legal permits.

=== National tours ===
List of national tours, showing dates, venues, and locations
Tour title	Date(s)	Venue	City	Country	Ref.
Silakbo: the concert tour 2025	March 6–7, 2025 (postponed)†	Baguio Convention and Cultural Center	Baguio City	Philippines	
Silakbo: the concert tour 2025	March 22, 2025	SMX Convention Center	Davao City	Philippines	
Silakbo: the concert tour 2025	March 29, 2025	IC3 Convention Center	Cebu City	Philippines	
Silakbo: the concert tour 2025	June 13, 2025	La Salle Coliseum	Bacolod City	Philippines	
Stardust	February 6, 2026	University of Baguio	Baguio City	Philippines	
Stardust	February 28, 2026	Sta Rosa Multi-Purpose Complex	Santa Rosa City	Philippines	
Stardust	March 21, 2026	Tacloban City Convention Center	Tacloban City	Philippines	
Stardust	March 28, 2026	Waterfront Cebu City Hotel & Casino	Cebu City	Philippines	
Stardust	May 9, 2026	Iloilo Convention Center	Iloilo City	Philippines	
Stardust	May 30, 2026 (cancelled)‡	SMX Convention Center	Davao City	Philippines	
Stardust	September 12, 2026‡	The Atrium, Limketkai Mall	Cagayan de Oro	Philippines	

† Baguio City was labeled as postponed for no circumstances but never received new dates.

‡ Davao City was also labeled as postponed but it was later officially cancelled, with Cagayan de Oro (CDO) being postponed due to Music Awards Japan on June 13. CDO was rescheduled to September 12 from its original June 13 date.
