= Pahina (song) =

Song by Cup of Joe

from the album Silakbo
- Language: Filipino
- English title: Page
- Released: January 17, 2025
- Length: 4:09
- Label: Viva
- Songwriters: Clint Joules Fernandez; Gabriel Fernandez; Gian Bernardino; Raphaell Ridao
- Producer: Jovel Rivera

"Pahina" (lit. 'Page') is a song recorded by Filipino band Cup of Joe for their debut studio album, Silakbo (2025). It is listed as the sixth track of the album, in which it was released on January 17, 2025, through Viva Records. The song is a tribute to a former lover, describing it as the most remarkable chapter of one's life. It was also described as "movie soundtrack-like", involves pleading to a special person about retaining their past love. The song entered two Billboard national charts, and peaked at number 10 and number 5 at the Philippines Hot 100 and Top Philippine Songs, respectively.

== Background and release ==
On January 13, 2025, the band held a press conference in Makati City to discuss the album's release, themes, and the upcoming concert, ahead of its release after the band's previous released single in 2024, titled Multo. The album was titled Silakbo, and consists of 10 personal tracks and each one of the tracks was based on Swiss-American psychiatrist Elisabeth Kübler-Ross' five stages of grief: denial, anger, bargaining, depression, and acceptance.

The album was released on January 17, 2025, ahead of the band's sold out two-day concert at the Araneta Coliseum on February 8 and 9, 2025.

== Composition ==
"Pahina" is four minutes and nine seconds long, and was written by Gian Bernardino, Gabriel Fernandez, Clint Joules Fernandez, and Raphaell Ridao. Produced by Jovel Rivera, a track inspired by CJ's "hearbreak rant", is a tribute to a former lover, describing it as the most remarkable chapter of one's life. Gian also described the track as "movie soundtrack-like", involves pleading to a special person about retaining their past love. CJ also mentioned the track as "bittersweet" due to its inspiration and is a proud creation.

== Controversy ==
On October 15, 2025, Gian Bernardino called out on his social media that post that Renegade Stories' AI-generated rock cover of the song had debuted on Spotify Philippines Viral Songs chart, surpassing the original version. Renegade Stories stated on their Facebook that the cover was not fully AI-generated but incorporated with AI to enhance the recording, saying it was meant to highlight the song's arrangement and melody. The track was later removed on Spotify through DistroKid, as reported by Pop Base Philippines.

== Accolades ==
Award	Year	Category	Result	Ref.
VP Choice Awards	2026	OPM Song of the Year	Nominated	

== Charts ==
Chart performance for "Pahina"
Chart (2025)	Peak position
Philippines (IFPI)	10
Philippines (Philippines Hot 100)	10
Philippines (Top Philippine Songs)	5

== Credits and personnel ==
Credits are adapted from Apple Music.

- Cup of Joe – vocals
- Clint Joules Fernandez – songwriter
- Gabriel Fernandez – songwriter
- Gian Bernardino – songwriter
- Raphaell Ridao – songwriter
- Jovel Rivera – producer
