= Tingin =

Single by Cup of Joe featuring Janine Teñoso

from the EP Patutunguhan
- Language: Filipino
- English title: Look
- Released: April 28, 2023
- Genre: Alternative pop
- Length: 3:42
- Label: Viva
- Songwriters: Gian Bernardino; Vixen Gareza; Redentor Ridao; Raphaell Ridao; Janine Teñoso
- Producer: Shadiel Chan

Cup of Joe singles chronology
"Tataya" (2023)	"Tingin" (2023)	"Lahat ng Bukas" (2024)

Janine Teñoso singles chronology
"Pelikula" (2021)	"Tingin" (2023)	"Apat na Buwan" (2024)

Music video
- "Tingin" on YouTube

"Tingin" (lit. 'Look') is a song by Filipino band Cup of Joe featuring Janine Teñoso from their extended play (EP) Patutunguhan (transl. Destination) (2023). It was released on April 28, 2023 by Viva Records. The song was written by three of the five members of Cup of Joe, Gian Bernardino, Vixen Gareza and Raphaell Ridao, with additional contributions from Redentor Ridao, Teñoso and production from Shadiel Chan. The song was accompanied by a music video released on October 23, 2023, directed by Jay-Ar Villarojas, which follows separate storylines centered on Teñoso, Bernardino and Ridao before converging in a rooftop jam session and stage performance.

"Tingin" debuted at number 25 on the Billboard Philippines Songs chart on October 27, 2023, marking both its first week on the chart and its peak position. Its entry contributed to a new milestone, with 17 Filipino acts charting simultaneously. The song has been performed live on several occasions, including a Wish 107.5 Bus performance uploaded in July 2023, appearances during the band's Silakbo concert tour in 2025, and live sets as an opening act for Lola Amour in April 2024 and at Billboard Philippines: Mainstage at the SM Mall of Asia Arena later that year. In 2024, the song won Wish Song Collaboration of the Year at the Wish Music Awards.

== Background and composition ==
Cup of Joe began production on their debut extended play (EP) Patutunguhan, which was featured on Billboard Philippines' list of top albums and EPs of 2023. The EP includes a mix of new material and previously released singles. "Tingin" was released on April 28, 2023 and later included as the opening track of Cup of Joe's EP Patutunguhan (2023). The song marked the first chart entry for both Janine Teñoso and the band on the Billboard Philippines Songs chart.

"Tingin" is an alternative pop song featuring "dream pop" and "atmospheric" instrumentals. It was written by three of the five members of Cup of Joe, Gian Bernardino, Vixen Gareza and Raphaell Ridao, with additional songwriting from Redentor Ridao and Janine Teñoso. The former four also contributed with arrangements, while production was handled by Shadiel Chan, who also served as recording and mixing engineer. Mayks Go writing for Billboard Philippines, stated that the song explore the viewpoint of someone who stays entirely focused on the person they love, even when surrounded by the chaos of the world. According to the band, the song connected with listeners across different age groups, especially Generation Z and millennials. They said the experience felt surreal and that their focus was on expressing their stories and emotions through the music, rather than chasing commercial success.

== Music video and promotion ==
The official music video for "Tingin" was released by Cup of Joe's YouTube channel on October 23, 2023, and was directed by Jay-Ar Villarojas. The video depicts three perspectives, focusing on Teñoso, Bernardino and Ridao. Each is shown experiencing personal struggles before ultimately coming together for a rooftop jam session, followed by a stage performance.

Cup of Joe and Janine Teñoso's performance of "Tingin" on the Wish 107.5 Bus was uploaded on July 17, 2023 to YouTube. In March 2025, the band performed "Tingin" during their Silakbo concert tour in Cebu. The band served as the opening act for Lola Amour's concert at the Circuit Makati Event Grounds in April 2024, where they performed "Tingin". On October 15, Cup of Joe performed at Billboard Philippines: Mainstage, the first anniversary show, held at the SM Mall of Asia Arena in Pasay City, where they performed their single "Tingin" with the entire arena singing along.

== Commercial performance ==
Following its release on April 28, 2023, "Tingin" debuted at number 25 on the Billboard Philippines Songs chart dated October 27, 2023, also marking its peak position. The song contributed to a week where 17 Filipino acts charted simultaneously on the Philippines Songs chart. By August 10, 2024, the single entered the top 10 of the Billboard Philippines Top Philippine Songs chart, climbing to number 10. The song later climbed to number 4 on the Philippines Hot 100, reached number 5 on the Top Philippine Songs chart, and peaked at number 7 on the Philippines chart under the International Federation of the Phonographic Industry (IFPI).

At the inauguration of the Official Philippines Chart on February 19, 2025, the song was recognized as the ninth Local Song of the Year. As of November 2023, the song had surpassed 22 million streams on Spotify. It also became the top-performing song by an OPM band on several Spotify editorial playlists in the Philippines.

=== Reception ===
In 2024, "Tingin" won Wish Song Collaboration of the Year at the Wish Music Awards. In December 2025, Spotify Philippines included the song among its Top Local Songs of the year, placing seventh. It was also recognized by Apple Music Philippines on December 2, 2025, listing it seventh among its Top OPM Songs.

== Credits and personnel ==
Credits are adapted from Apple Music.

Cup of Joe members

- Gian Bernardino – songwriting, arranger
- Vixen Gareza – songwriting, arranger
- Raphaell Ridao – songwriting, arranger

Contributors

- Redentor Ridao – songwriting, arranger
- Janine Teñoso – featured vocals, songwriting

Production

- Shadiel Chan – producer, mixing engineer, recording engineer

== Charts ==
=== Weekly charts ===
Chart performance for "Tingin"
Chart (2023)	Peak position
Philippines (Billboard)	4

Chart (2025)	Peak position
Philippines Hot 100 (Billboard Philippines)	6
Philippines Top Songs (Billboard Philippines)	4
Philippines (IFPI)	7

=== Year-end charts ===
Year-end chart performance for "Tingin"
Chart (2024)	Position
Philippines Hot 100 (Billboard Philippines)	14
Philippines Top Songs (Billboard Philippines)	9

Chart (2025)	Position
Philippines Hot 100 (Billboard Philippines)	9
Philippines Top Songs (Billboard Philippines)	5
