= Sandali (Cup of Joe song) =

Single by Cup of Joe

from the EP Sandali
- Language: Tagalog
- English title: Moment
- Released: September 10, 2025
- Genre: Pop rock
- Length: 3:39
- Label: Viva
- Songwriters: Edgar Gian Bernardino; Raphaell Ridao; Antonio Gabriel Fernandez; Clint Joules Fernandez; Vixen Zhaesar Gareza
- Producers: Shadiel Chan; Jovel Rivera

Cup of Joe singles chronology
"Multo" (2024)	"Sandali" (2025)

"Sandali" (lit. 'Moment') is song by Filipino band Cup of Joe. It was written by all band members. Produced by Shadiel Chan and Jovel Rivera, the pop rock track is a homage to commitment and loyalty dedicated to their fanbase. It was surprise-released on September 10, 2025, under Viva Records. Its extended play (EP) with the same name was released on May 1, 2026.

The music video was directed by the band's vocalist, Gian Bernardino in his directorial debut, with fellow vocalist Raphaell Ridao contributing to the concept, and features the band performed the song with accompanying animations, with reflecting their identity, emphasizing simplicity through the absence of characters and complex narratives.

== Background ==
The album's release coincided with the commencement of their two-day Silakbo (transl. Outburst) tour kickoff concert at the Araneta Coliseum, prior to national touring. After the major success of their tracks, including Multo, the band announced that they will hold their third major solo concert, Stardust, on October 10 and 11 at the Araneta Coliseum.

In commemoration to their seven-year anniversary, the band surprise-released their track, titled "Sandali". It was hinted as a pre-concert release prior to their upcoming concert.

== Composition ==
The track is three minutes and thirty-nine seconds long and was written by all band members. Produced by Shadiel Chan and Jovel Rivera, the pop rock track that is a homage to commitment and loyalty dedicated to their fanbase. The song marks a shift for the group, as all members contribute vocals during the bridge, a departure from their usual focus on dual frontmen Bernardino and Ridao. This vocal layering imbues the single with a communal energy, enhancing their characteristic bright and emotional pop rock sound.

Musically, "Sandali" features driving guitar riffs, steady chord progressions, and textured synths, which create a more direct musical feel compared to "Multo", with the vocals of Bernardino and Ridao remaining central. It also serves as a comforting reminder of the band's signature blend of melodious storytelling and youthful energy, uniquely featuring each member's contribution to the songwriting, which underscores the group's unity and evolution over time.

== Music video ==
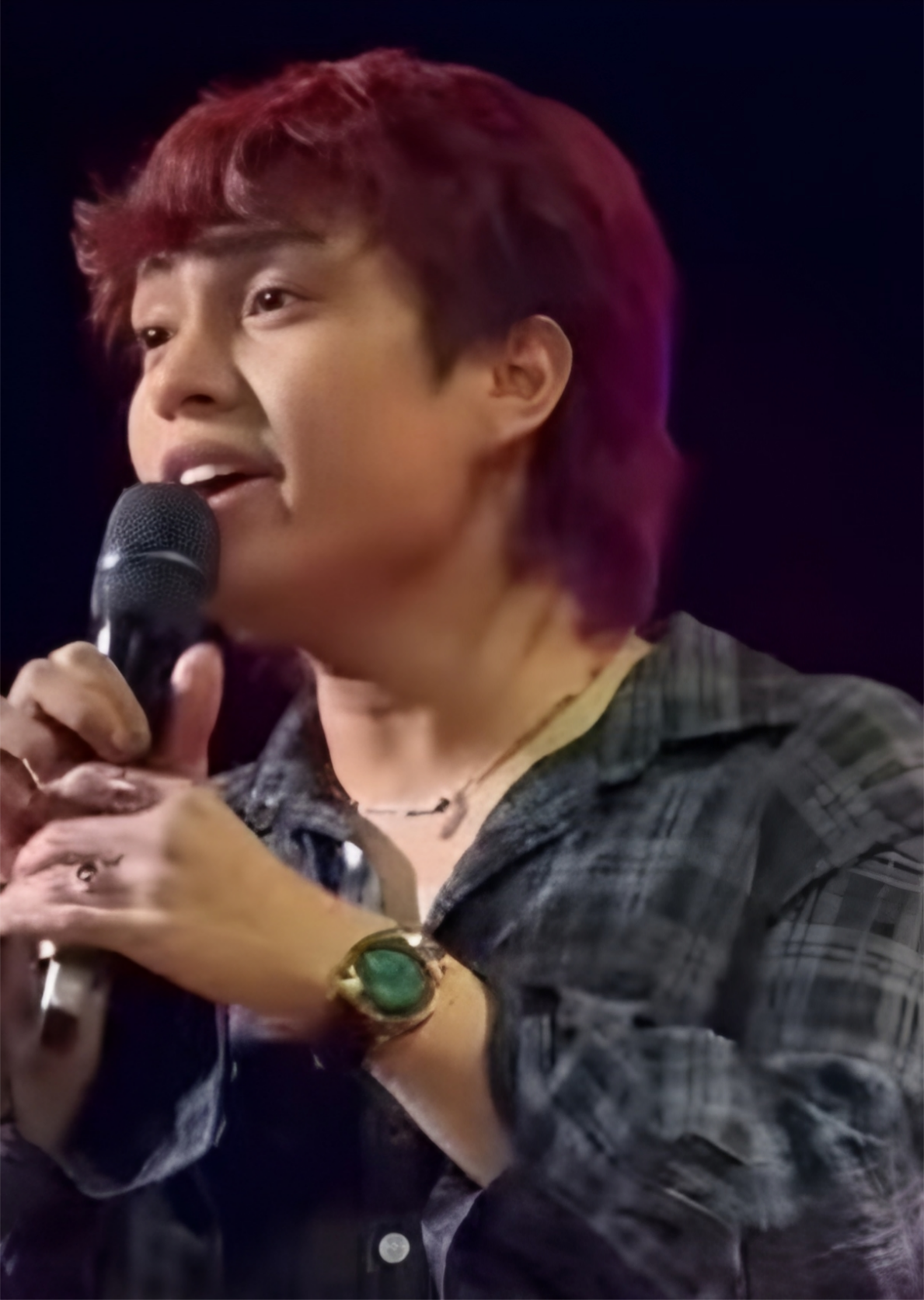
Bernardino made his directorial debut for the music video

The band's vocalist, Gian Bernardino made his directorial debut, with fellow vocalist Raphaell Ridao contributing to the concept. In the music video, the band performed the song with accompanying animations. According to the band, they expressed that the music video reflects their identity, emphasizing simplicity through the absence of characters and complex narratives.

== Credits and personnel ==
Credits are adapted from Apple Music.

- Cup of Joe – vocals
- Edgar Gian Bernardino – songwriter
- Raphaell Ridao – songwriter
- Antonio Gabriel Fernandez – songwriter
- Clint Joules Fernandez – songwriter
- Vixen Zhaesar Gareza – songwriter
- Shadiel Chan – producer
- Jovel Rivera – producer

== Commercial performance ==
Following its release two weeks later, it debuted at number 49 on the Billboard Philippines Hot 100.

== Charts ==
Chart performance for "Sandali"
Chart (2025)	Peak position
Philippines (Philippines Hot 100)	49

== Listicles ==
Name of publisher, year listed, name of listicle, and placement
Publisher	Year	Listicle	Placement	Ref.
Billboard Philippines	2025	25 Best Filipino Songs of 2025	Placed	
Billboard Philippines	2025	7 Filipino Songs to Kickstart your New Year Right	Placed	

== Accolades ==
Award	Year	Category	Result	Ref.
Filipino Music Awards	2026	People's Choice Awards: Song	Pending	
Filipino Music Awards	2026	Alternative Song of the Year	Pending	
