= Gian Bernardino =

Filipino singer and actor (born 2001)

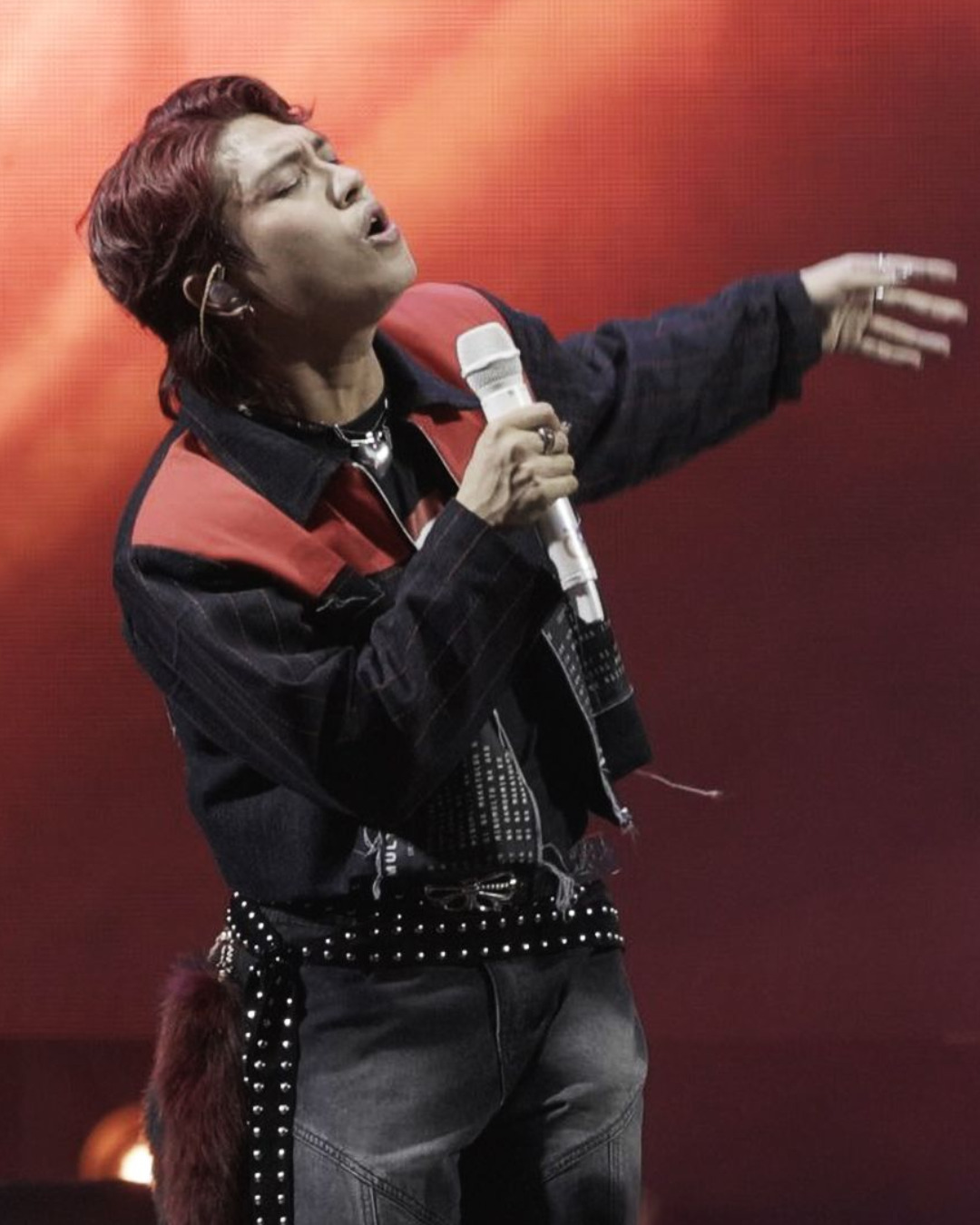
- Bernardino in 2025
- Born: July 24, 2001 (age 25); Villasis, Pangasinan, Philippines
- Education: University of Baguio
- Occupations: Singer; songwriter; actor
- Years active: 2018–present
- Musical career
- Genres: Alternative rock; indie pop; pop rock; OPM
- Instruments: Vocals
- Label: Viva
- Member of: Cup of Joe

Edgar Gian Pascua Bernardino (born July 24, 2001) is a Filipino singer, songwriter, and actor. He is one of two lead vocalists and a founding member of the pop rock band Cup of Joe, formed in 2018. He has written various songs for the band, as well as pursuing acting in film and television.

On November 26, 2021, Bernardino appeared as Kulas in the TV show Quaranthings The Series. On June 5, 2022, he starred in the short film Kubli (lit. 'Hidden'). In 2023, he portrayed the main character Hero in the short film Microplastics, an entry to the QCinema film festival. Bernardino has also starred in the music videos for "Bagong Buwan" (lit. 'New Moon') by J-Quinn and "Sino Ang Tanga" (lit. 'Who's The Fool?') by Maris Racal. In June 2026, Bernardino signed with Viva Films and Viva Artists Agency to expand his solo acting career. In the following months, he was cast as Bunak in the upcoming Filipino adaptation of the Thai horror comedy film Pee Mak (2013) and in the road trip buddy film One For The Road.

== Life and career ==
=== 2001–2019: Early life, Cup of Joe, and Viva Records ===
Edgar Gian Bernardino was born on July 24, 2001. He is an Ilocano hailing from the province of Pangasinan, Philippines. At around the age of three, he began discovering his voice and joined singing contests in Qatar, where he and his family lived from 2004 to 2017. In 2013, he had a solo performance at a National Day celebration in the country, held at the Al-Rayyan Stadium. In 2015, he auditioned for the reality competition series Pinoy Big Brother: 737. He received a callback inviting him to come to the Philippines for the show, but declined when he realized that his family would not allow him to leave Qatar on his own because he was still in eighth grade. He returned to the Philippines when he was in senior high school; according to Bernardino, he experienced bullying at the time because he was "soft".

Bernardino studied at the Saint Louis University Laboratory High School in Baguio, Philippines, where he and Raphaell Ridao formed the band Cup of Joe as Grade 12 students in 2018. The band's music reached listeners beyond Baguio via Spotify and social media. In 2019, Cup of Joe signed with Viva Records, with Bernardino as lead vocalist alongside Ridao. As of 2020, Bernardino was pursuing dentistry at the University of Baguio.

=== 2020–2025: Microplastics and directorial debut ===
In 2020, Bernardino composed and performed "Angat Baguio" (lit. 'Rise Baguio'), which placed third in a Baguio Day songwriting competition held by the province's Tourism Office.

In 2023, Bernardino portrayed the lead role, Hero, in the short film Microplastics, directed by Lino Balmes. It premiered at the QCinema film festival. According to Lé Baltar of Rappler, the film uses microplastics as a metaphor for society deeming queerness as unclean. Despite the film's "fair share of lapses", she commended its refusal to "sanitize" queer experiences.

In July 2024, Bernardino and singer-actress Jhoanna Robles portrayed the leads in the music video for "Misteryoso" (lit. 'Mysterious') by Cup of Joe. He is credited as the track's sole lyricist and also co-produced it with his bandmates. Ghilieah Valeska Tabbada of Pulp called "Misteryoso" the "ultimate feel-good bop" of 2024 and arguably one of the band's best songs. She praised the "heart-fluttering" onscreen chemistry between Bernardino and Robles as well, deeming every scene between them to be "swoon-worthy". The following year, Bernardino starred in the music video for "Bagong Buwan" (lit. 'New Moon'), a synth-pop love song by drag queen J-Quinn, as the singer's love interest. The music video was described as "neon-drenched" and "dreamy". The first episode of his monthly podcast G on Top premiered on May 23. In November, When in Manila included G on Top on their list of Filipino podcast recommendations.

Bernardino wrote eight of the songs in the Cup of Joe's debut album Silakbo (lit. 'Outburst'). In June, Bernardino performed at Lov3laban (pronounced "Love Laban", meaning "Love Fight"), a Pride Month celebration held at the University of the Philippines Diliman in Quezon City, Philippines. On October 3, Bernardino made his directorial debut with the music video for Cup of Joe's single Sandali (lit. 'Wait'), with Raphaell Ridao contributing to the concept. On September 6, Bernardino appeared as one of the guest performers at Janine Teñoso's first solo concert, held at the New Frontier Theater in Quezon City.

=== 2026–present: Other works ===
On February 13, 2026, Bernardino starred as Maris Racal's love interest in the music video for her song "Sino Ang Tanga" (lit. 'Who's The Fool'). The video showed Racal and Bernardino sharing romantic and intimate moments, such as Bernardino gently kissing her leg. Pauline Songco of the Daily Tribune praised the video's "visually compelling storyline" and the onscreen chemistry between Bernardino and Racal.

In March, he was a guest reporter on the digital news program TV Patrol Express. The newspaper SunStar Cebu included Bernardino in their list of best celebrity news presenters of the 2020s, noting his ease and confidence in reporting.

On June 23, Bernardino signed a contract with Viva Films and Viva Artists Agency to expand his solo acting career. On August 12, he was cast as Bunak in the upcoming Filipino remake of the Thai horror comedy film Pee Mak (2013), with Wilbert Ross and Bea Binene in the lead roles. It will be his feature film debut. In September, he joined the lead cast of One For The Road, a road trip buddy comedy also starring Elijah Canlas, Emilio Daez, and JM Ibarra. Kip Oebanda and Victor Villanueva will direct.

== Public image ==
Bernardino has received media attention for challenging gender norms in rock music and fashion. (Note: Attributed to multiple sources:) In July 2023, Filipino magazine Parcinq noted that his "fearless" fashion sense can be masculine, feminine, androgynous, high-fashion, or avant-garde depending on the occasion. Ralph Regis of Billboard Philippines said that Bernardino brings "boldness" and gender fluidity to his clothing and makeup choices, such as pairing corsets with dress shirts. In interviews with Metroscene and ABS-CBN Entertainment, he stated that he hopes to be a role model for younger fans who intend to pursue rock music as well, showing a male rock musician leaning into his feminine side despite pressures to perform hyper-masculinity.

== Musical styles and influences ==
Bernardino is known for his stage presence and playful personality in live performances with Cup of Joe. He sometimes adds spoken word parts to his songs. Nylon Manila described his vocals as emotional and energetic, reflecting the sound of modern OPM pop rock.

Bernardino cited OPM bands such as Eraserheads, Rivermaya, and Apo Hiking Society, also he recalled that he grew up singing ballads and frequently joined amateur competitions as a child. He was first exposed to karaoke hits by international pop musicians such as Celine Dion and Beyoncé. As a teenager, he started listening to OPM and became interested in pop rock, which later led him to try songwriting.

== Other ventures ==
In June 2025, Bernardino and his Cup of Joe bandmate Raphaell Ridao endorsed Filipino makeup brand Careline's Oil Control Face Powder. In July, Bernardino joined Angat Buhay's relief operations to help communities affected by storms and the southwest monsoon ("habagat"), which caused flooding in different parts of the Philippines.

== Personal life ==
In 2025, Bernardino came out as pansexual, explaining that he is attracted to other people of any gender.

== Songwriting credits ==
List of singles, showing year released and associated albums
Title	Year	Artist	Album	Credits	References
"Nag-iisang Muli"	2019	Cup of Joe	Non-album single	Lyricist, arranger	
"Sinderela"	2019	Cup of Joe	Non-album single	Lyricist, arranger	
"Alas Dose"	2019	Cup of Joe	Non-album single	Lyricist, arranger	
"Sagada"	2020	Cup of Joe	Non-album single	Lyricist	
"Bukod-Tangi"	2021	Cup of Joe	Non-album single	Lyricist	
"Estranghero"	2022	Cup of Joe	Non-album single	Lyricist	
"Misteryoso"	2024	Cup of Joe	Non-album single	Lyricist, producer	
"Bubog"	2025	Cup of Joe	Silakbo	Lyricist, composer	
"Siping"	2025	Cup of Joe	Silakbo	Lyricist, composer	
"Pahina"	2025	Cup of Joe	Silakbo	Lyricist, composer	
"'Di Maaari"	2025	Cup of Joe	Silakbo	Lyricist, composer	
"Hinga"	2025	Cup of Joe	Silakbo	Lyricist, composer	
"Silakbo"	2025	Cup of Joe	Silakbo	Lyricist, composer	

== Filmography ==
=== Online/Digital ===
Year	Title	Role	Notes	Ref.
2025–present	G on Top	Himself	Podcast hosted by Bernardino	
2026	Evangelism	Himself	Podcast hosted by Eva Le Queen	

=== Television ===
Year	Title	Role	Ref.
2021	Quaranthings The Series	Kulas	
2026	Gandang Gabi Vice	Himself (Guest)	

=== Film ===
Year	Title	Role	Notes	Ref.
2022	Kubli	Danyel	Short film	
2023	Microplastics	Hero (as a teen)	Short film	
2026	Pee Mak	Bunak	Feature film debut	
TBA	One For The Road	TBA	Lead role	

=== Music videos ===
Year	Title	Artist	Note	Ref.
2024	"Misteryoso"	Cup of Joe	Lead role	
2025	"Bagong Buwan"	J-Quinn		
2025	"Sandali"	Cup of Joe	Directorial debut	
2026	"Sino Ang Tanga"	Maris Racal		

== Awards ==
Award	Year	Category	Nominee(s)	Result	Ref.
New Hue Video Music Awards	2025	Vocalists of the Year	Gian Bernardino	Won	
