= Misterioso =

Misterioso means mysterious in the Italian language, and in the context of written music, is an instruction to the performer to play the music in a mysterious mood. It may also refer to:

- "Misterioso", a composition by jazz pianist Thelonious Monk and the title for two of his albums
  - Misterioso (Thelonious Monk album), 1958
  - Misterioso (Recorded on Tour), 1965
  - Misterioso, a 1991 TV film with Suzan Sylvester and Jack Shepherd, in which the eponymous Monk piece features prominently; aired as part of The Play on One series on BBC One.
- Misterioso (Paul Motian album), 1987
- Misterioso (wrestler) (born 1966), Mexican-American professional wrestler
- Misterioso, Jr., Mexican masked professional wrestler
- Misterioso (novel), by Arne Dahl
  - Misterioso (film), a TV film based on the novel

== See also ==
- "Misteryoso", a 2024 single by Filipino pop/rock band Cup of Joe
