= List of awards and nominations received by Moira Dela Torre =

Moira Dela Torre awards and nominations
Awards and nominations
Award	Wins	Nominations
Awit Awards	11	33
Aliw Awards	1	1
Billboard Philippines Women in Music	1	1
Himig Handog	7	7
LionHearTV RAWR Award	0	3
MTV Europe Music Awards	0	1
MOR Pinoy Music Awards	3	7
Myx Music Awards	5	19
PMPC Star Awards for Music	4	11
PUSH Music Awards	1	4
TAG Awards Chicago	0	1
Village People Choice Award	0	1
WISH Music Awards	4	14
Other awards	3	3

Totals (Note: Certain award groups do not simply award one winner. They acknowledge several different recipients, have runners-up, and have third place. Since this is a specific recognition and is different from losing an award, runner-up mentions are considered wins in this award tally. For simplification and to avoid errors, each award in this list has been presumed to have had a prior nomination.)
- Wins: 37
- Nominations: 70

This is a list of awards and nominations received by Filipino singer-songwriter Moira Rachelle Bustamante Cruzado Dela Torre, best known by her stage name Moira Dela Torre.

Music award|L.A. Music Awards Timeless Artist Of The Year Award|1|1}}

== Awit Awards ==
Year	Award	Nominated work	Result	Ref
2015	Best Ballad Recording	"If You Tell Me You Love Me" with (Ferdie Marquez)	Nominated	
2015	Performance by a New Female Recording Artist	"Love Me Instead"	Nominated	
2015	Performance by a Female Recording Artist	"Love Me Instead"	Nominated	
2018	Best Song Written for Movie/TV	"Saglit"	Nominated	
2018	Performance by a Female Recording Artist	"Titibo-tibo"	Won	
2018	People's Voice Song	"Titibo-tibo"	Won	
2018	Record of the Year	"Titibo-tibo"	Nominated	
2018	Song of the Year	"Titibo-tibo"	Nominated	
2019	Album of the Year	"Malaya"	Won	
2019	Best Ballad Recording	"Tagpuan"	Nominated	
2019	Music Video of the Year	"Tagpuan"	Won	
2019	Record of the Year	"Tagpuan"	Nominated	
2019	Song of the Year	"Tagpuan"	Won	
2019	Best Pop Recording	"Tagu-taguan"	Nominated	
2019	Collaboration of the Year	"Knots" with (Nieman)	Won	
2019	Collaboration of the Year	"Langit Lupa" with (Iñigo Pascual)	Nominated	
2020	Best Ballad Recording	"Kung Di Rin Lang Ikaw" with (December Avenue)	Nominated	
2020	Best Collaboration	"Kung Di Rin Lang Ikaw" with (December Avenue)	Nominated	
2020	Best Pop Recording	"Kung Di Rin Lang Ikaw" with (December Avenue)	Nominated	
2020	Song of the Year	"Kung Di Rin Lang Ikaw" with (December Avenue)	Nominated	
2020	Best Collaboration	"Mabagal" with (Daniel Padilla)	Nominated	
2020	Best Jazz Recording	"Mabagal" with (Daniel Padilla)	Nominated	
2020	Favorite Collaboration Performance	"Mabagal" with (Daniel Padilla)	Won	
2020	Favorite Music Video of the Year	"Mabagal" with (Daniel Padilla)	Won	
2020	Favorite Record of the Year	"Mabagal" with (Daniel Padilla)	Won	
2020	Music Video of the Year	"Mabagal" with (Daniel Padilla)	Nominated	
2020	Record of the Year	"Mabagal" with (Daniel Padilla)	Nominated	
2020	Best Collaboration	"Paalam" with (Ben&Ben)	Nominated	
2020	Record of the Year	"Paalam" with (Ben&Ben)	Nominated	
2020	Best Song Written for Movie/TV	"Unbreakable" with (Regine Velasquez)	Nominated	
2020	Best Christmas Recording	"Yakap"	Nominated	
2020	Most Streamed Artist	"Moira Dela Torre"	Won	
2020	Most Streamed Song	"Ikaw At Ako" with (Jason Marvin)	Won	

== Aliw Awards ==
Year	Award	Nominated work	Result	Ref
2023	Best Major Concert (Female)	“Moira 2023”	Won	
2019	Best Major Concert (Female)	"Braver"	Nominated	

== Billboard Philippines Women in Music ==
Year	Award	Nominated work	Result	Ref
2024	Hitmaker Award	Moira dela Torre	Won	

== Himig Handog ==
Year	Award	Nominated work	Result	Ref
2017	Best Song	"Titibo-tibo"	Won	
2019	Best Song	"Mabagal" with Daniel Padilla	Won	
2019	Listener's Choice for Most Streamed Track	"Mabagal" with Daniel Padilla	Won	
2019	MOR Philippines’ Choice Award	"Mabagal" with Daniel Padilla	Won	
2019	MYX Choice for Best Music Video	"Mabagal" with Daniel Padilla	Won	
2019	ONE Music PH's Choice for Favorite Interpreter	"Mabagal" with Daniel Padilla	Won	
2019	Star Music's Choice Award for Best Produced Track	"Mabagal" with Daniel Padilla	Won	

== LionHearTV RAWR Awards ==
Year	Award	Nominated work	Result	Ref
2018	Hugot Song of the Year	"Tagpuan"	Nominated	
2019	Favorite Performer of the Year	"Moira Dela Torre"	Nominated	
2020	Favorite Performer of the Year	"Moira Dela Torre"	Nominated	

== MTV Europe Music Awards ==
Year	Award	Nominated work	Result	Ref.
2019	Favorite Southeast Asian Artist	"Moira dela Torre"	Nominated	

== MOR Pinoy Music Awards ==
Year	Award	Nominated work	Result	Ref
2018	Female Artist of the Year	"Titibo-Tibo"	Won	
2018	Song of the Year	"Titibo-Tibo"	Nominated	
2018	OPM Revival of the Year	"Sundo"	Nominated	
2019	Best Collaboration of the Year	"Kung Di Rin Lang Ikaw" with December Avenue	Won	
2019	Song of the Year	"Kung Di Rin Lang Ikaw" with December Avenue	Nominated	
2019	OPM Revival of the Year	"Kahit Maputi Na Ang Buhok Ko"	Nominated	
2019	Female Artist of the Year	"Moira dela Torre"	Won	

== Myx Music Awards ==
Year	Award	Nominated work	Result	Ref
2018	Mellow Video of the Year	"Malaya"	Won	
2018	Media Soundtrack of the Year	"Torete"	Nominated	
2018	Song of the Year	"Titibo-tibo"	Nominated	
2019	Artist of the Year	"Moira Dela Torre"	Nominated	
2019	Female Artist of the Year	"Moira Dela Torre"	Nominated	
2019	Collaboration of the Year	"Kung Di Rin Lang Ikaw" with (December Avenue)	Won	
2019	Media Soundtrack of the Year	"Kahit Maputi Na Ang Buhok Ko"	Nominated	
2019	Mellow Video of the Year	"Tagpuan"	Won	
2019	Music Video of the Year	"Tagpuan"	Nominated	
2019	Song of the Year	"Tagpuan"	Nominated	
2020	Artist of the Year	"Moira Dela Torre"	Nominated	
2020	Song of the Year	"Mabagal" with (Daniel Padilla)	Nominated	
2020	Mellow Video of the Year	"Mabagal" with (Daniel Padilla)	Won	
2020	Collaboration of the Year	"Mabagal" with (Daniel Padilla)	Won	
2020	Collaboration of the Year	"Patawad, Paalam" with (I Belong to the Zoo)	Nominated	
2021	Artist of the Year	"Moira dela Torre"	Nominated	
2021	Collaboration of the Year	"Paalam" (with Ben&Ben)	Won	
2021	Mellow Video of the Year	"Patawad"	Nominated	
2021	Song of the Year	"Paubaya"	Nominated	

== PMPC Star Awards for Music ==
Year	Award	Nominated work	Result	Ref
2017	Movie Original Theme Song of the Year	"Malaya" (Camp Sawi) OST	Nominated	
2018	Album of the Year	"Malaya"	Won	
2018	Album Cover of the Year	"Malaya"	Nominated	
2018	Female Recording Artist of the Year	"Malaya"	Nominated	
2018	Music Video of the Year	"Tagpuan"	Nominated	
2018	Movie Original Theme Song of the Year	"Huling Gabi"	Nominated	
2018	Song of the Year	"Titibo-Tibo"	Nominated	
2018	Female Pop Artist of the Year	"Moira dela Torre"	Won	
2019	Song of the Year	"Ikaw at Ako" with (Jason Marvin)	Nominated	
2019	Song of the Year	"Kung Di Rin Lang Ikaw" with December Avenue	Nominated	
2019	Collaboration of the Year	"Kung Di Rin Lang Ikaw" with December Avenue	Won	
2019	Female Recording Artist of the Year	"Kahit Maputi Na Ang Buhok Ko"	Won	

== PUSH Music Awards ==
Year	Award	Nominated work	Result	Ref
2018	Push Music Performance of the Year	"Tagpuan"	Nominated	
2018	Push Music Personality of the Year	"Moira Dela Torre"	Nominated	
2019	Push Original Song of the Year	"Mabagal" with (Daniel Padilla)	Won	
2019	Push Original Song of the Year	"Patawad, Paalam" with (I Belong to the Zoo)	Nominated	

== TAG Awards Chicago ==
Year	Award	Nominated work	Result	Ref
2020	Song of the Year	"Paubaya"	Won	

== Village People Choice Award ==
Year	Award	Nominated work	Result	Ref
2019	Performer of the Year	"Braver"	Nominated	

== Wish Music Awards ==
Year	Award	Nominated work	Result	Ref.
2018	Wish Artist of the Year	"Moira dela Torre"	Nominated	
2018	Wishclusive Contemporary Folk Performance of the Year	"Malaya"	Won	
2018	Wishclusive Viral Video of the Year	"Malaya"	Won	
2018	Wish Pop Song of the Year	"Huling Gabi" ft.(Quest)	Nominated	
2019	Wish Artist of the Year	"Moira dela Torre"	Nominated	
2019	Wishclusive Collaboration of the Year	"Huli Na Ba Ang Lahat" with IV of Spades	Nominated	
2019	Wishclusive Collaboration of the Year	"Kung Di Rin Lang Ikaw" with December Avenue	Nominated	
2019	Wish Contemporary Folk Song of the Year	"Tagu-Taguan"	Nominated	
2019	Wish R&B Song of the Year	"Knots" with Nieman	Nominated	
2020	Wish Artist of the Year	"Moira Dela Torre"	Nominated	
2020	Wishclusive Ballad Song of the Year	"Ikaw At Ako" with (Jason Marvin)	Won	
2020	Wishclusive Collaboration of the Year	"Patawad, Paalam" with (I Belong to the Zoo)	Nominated	
2021	Best Quarantine-Produced Song	"May Pag-Asa" with (Jason Marvin)	Nominated	
2021	Wish Ballad Song of the Year	"Hanggang sa Huli"	Won	

== Other awards ==
- Wishclusive Elite Circle—Bronze Award - for reaching 10 million views on her "Malaya" radio performance on Wish 107.5 radio.
- Wishclusive Elite Circle—Bronze Award - for reaching 10 million views on her "Kung Di Rin Lang Ikaw" radio performance on Wish 107.5 with December Avenue.
- Wishclusive Elite Circle-Silver Award for reaching 25 million views on her "Kung Di Rin Lang Ikaw" radio performance on Wish 107.5 with December Avenue.
