= Aurora Music Festival =

Annual music and arts festival in Pampanga, Philippines

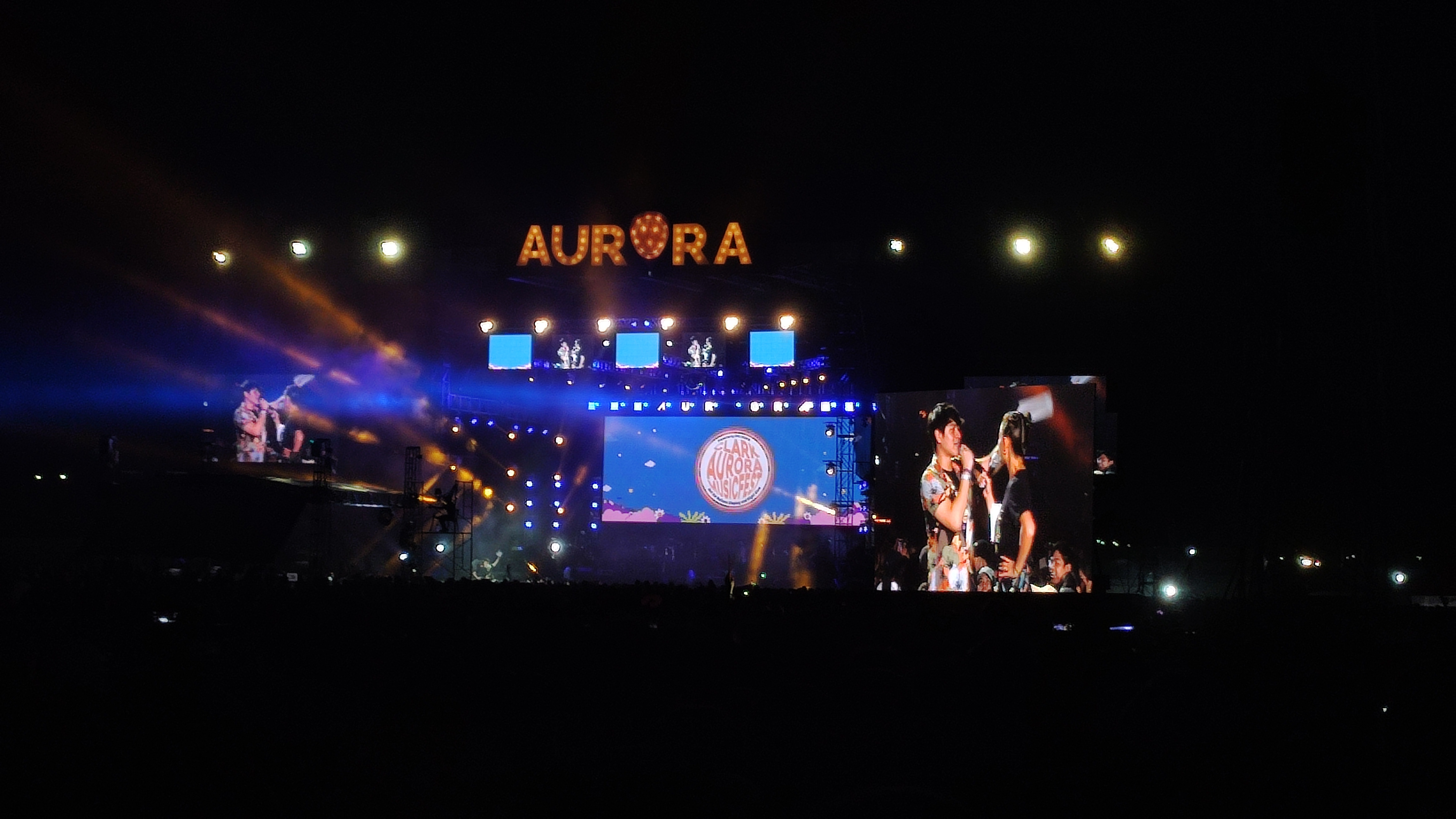
- Genre: Indie; pop; rock
- Dates: Clark: Summer (2-consecutive days); Cebu, Davao: either October or November
- Frequency: Annually
- Locations: Clark: Clark Global City, Pampanga, Philippines; Davao: Crocodile Park Concert Ground, Davao City, Philippines; Cebu: City Di Mare, Cebu City, Philippines
- Years active: 2022–present
- Inaugurated: 10 June 2020; 6 years ago
- Participants: See lineups
- Organiser: Epic Events
- Website: clarkaurorafest.com epiceventsph.com

The AURORA Music Festival (also referred to as the Clark Hot Air Balloon Music, Arts and Food Festival) is an annual music and arts festival featuring live music, food, art installations, and hot air balloons held in Clark Global City in Pampanga, Philippines over the course of two days. The festival was later expanded into Cebu and Davao. It is organized by Epic Events.

== Background ==
=== First edition and COVID-19 pandemic ===
The inaugural Aurora Music Festival, originally scheduled for the summer of 2020, was postponed due to the COVID-19 pandemic. It eventually took place from June 10–11, 2022. The festival featured hot air balloon displays and performances by local artists and bands. Tickets purchased for the original date remained valid for the rescheduled event.

=== Confusion with the Philippine International Hot Air Balloon Fiesta ===
The Aurora Music Festival is held in Clark Global City, inside the Clark Freeport Zone where the Philippine International Hot Air Balloon Fiesta (PIHABF) is also held since 1994 before they moved to Carmona, Cavite for its 2020 edition. When the music festival was announced, it created confusion with it being held at the same place, while also involving hot air balloons.

On April 13, 2022, the organizing committee of PIHABF released a statement to clarify that their event is different from the Clark Hot Air Balloon Music, Arts and Food Festival (AURORA Music Festival), and that they do not have any association with the organization and the management of the said event.

== Lineups ==
Year	Date	Headliners	Attendance	Ref.
2022	June 10–11, 2022	Skusta Clee; Kiyo; Al James; Because; Allison Shore; Michael Pangilinan; ALLMO$T; Ronnie Alonte		
2022	June 10–11, 2022	Ben&Ben; December Avenue; Arthur Nery; Unique Salonga		
2023	April 15–16, 2023	Ben&Ben; December Avenue; Arthur Nery; Adie; Mrld; Lola Amour		
2023	April 15–16, 2023	Ely Buendia; Parokya Ni Edgar; Kamikazee; Sponge Cola; Silent Sanctuary; Mayonnaise		
2024	April 6–7, 2024	SB19; Juan Karlos; Adie; Cup of Joe; December Avenue; Moira dela Torre		
2024	April 6–7, 2024	Rico Blanco; Parokya Ni Edgar; Kamikazee; Orange and Lemons; The Itchyworms; Andrew E		
2025	May 3–4, 2025	BINI; TJ Monterde; Rico Blanco; Arthur Nery; BGYO; Moira dela Torre	150,000	
2025	May 3–4, 2025	BINI; Maki; Cup of Joe; Dionela; Flow G; Over October	150,000	
2026	May 2–3, 2026	SB19; IV of Spades; Sarah Geronimo; Ben&Ben; December Avenue; Armi Millare		
2026	May 2–3, 2026	IV of Spades; SB19; Sexbomb; Parokya ni Edgar; Kitchie Nadal; Kamikazee		

== Expansion ==
Following the success of the Aurora Music Festival's first edition, the festival expanded to other cities and has been held annually in conjunction with the main festival in Clark, usually later in the year.

The first expansion was held in Cebu City on November 19, 2022, at the South Road Properties, with Ben&Ben, Zack Tabudlo, Arthur Nery, Adie, Unique Salonga, and Al James as headliners. This was the first and only edition held in Cebu after the cancellation of the 2023 edition. However, the Cebu edition is set to resume its second year on November 22, 2025, at City Di Mare with SB19 as its headliner.

The festival then expanded to Davao City, bringing Rico Blanco, Ben&Ben, Armi Millare, and Adie to the Crocodile Park Concert Ground on October 28, 2023. The second year of the Davao City edition was held on November 30, 2024, with Ely Buendia, Cup of Joe, Moira Dela Torre, Arthur Nery, and Orange and Lemons as headliners. The 2025 edition in Davao features Bini, Maki, Rob Deniel, and Amiel Sol.
