= Buwan ng Wika =

Month-long observance dedicated to Philippine languages

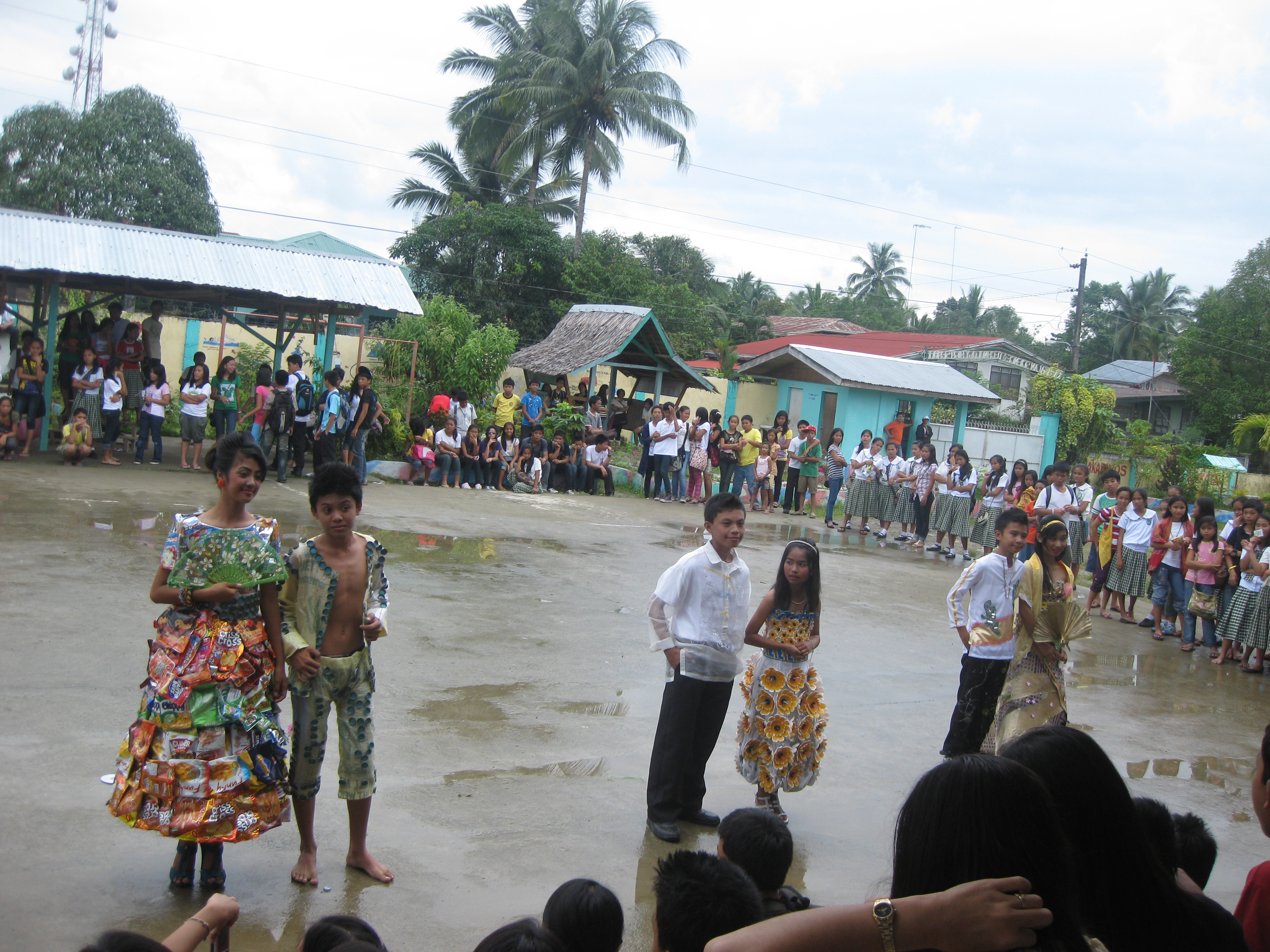
- Students wearing traditional Filipino clothing made from recycled materials as part of the Buwan ng Wika
- Official name: Buwan ng Wikang Pambansa
- Also called: National Language Month
- Observed by: Philippine schools nationwide
- Significance: Promotes importance of Filipino, the national language, and other indigenous languages of the Philippines.
- Begins: August 1
- Ends: August 31
- Duration: Whole month
- Frequency: Annual

Buwan ng Wikang Pambansa (Filipino for 'National Language Month'), simply known as Buwan ng Wika ('Language Month') and formerly and still referred to as Linggo ng Wika ('Language Week'), is a month-long annual observance in the Philippines held every August to promote the national language, Filipino. The Commission on the Filipino Language is the lead agency in charge of organizing events in relation to the observances.

== Background ==
=== National language ===
Efforts to introduce a national language in the Philippines began in 1935 during the Commonwealth era led by President Manuel L. Quezon. In 1946, a language based on Tagalog was adopted as the national language, which was officially designated as Pilipino in 1959. Quezon himself was born and raised in Baler, Aurora, which is a native Tagalog-speaking area. In 1973, Pilipino was formally renamed as "Filipino". Filipino and English were named as the official languages of the Philippines under the 1987 Constitution.

=== Linggo ng Wika ===
The predecessor of the Buwan ng Wika was the Linggo ng Wika ('Language Week'), which was established by president Sergio Osmeña through Proclamation No. 35 in 1946. From 1946 to 1953, the Linggo ng Wika was celebrated annually from March 27 to April 2. The end date was selected due to being the birthday of Tagalog litterateur Francisco Balagtas.

President Ramon Magsaysay modified the dates to March 29 to April 4 in 1954. For the following year, the observance's dates were changed again by Magsaysay to August 13 to 19 through Proclamation No. 186. The change was made due to the older dates falling on students' summer break which meant schools could not take part in it. The end date was selected for being the birthday of Manuel L. Quezon, who became known as the "Father of the National Language". In 1988, President Corazon Aquino affirmed the dates through Proclamation No. 19.

=== Buwan ng Wika ===
In 1997, President Fidel V. Ramos through Proclamation No. 1041 changed the observance duration of the Linggo ng Wika to cover the whole of August. The name of the observance was changed accordingly to Buwan ng Wikang Pambansa.

Since 2019, the promotion of the country's other indigenous languages has been part of the observances in line with the UNESCO's designation of the year as "International Year of Indigenous Languages".

== Observances and activities ==
The Komisyon ng Wikang Filipino (KWF) is the lead agency in charge of the Buwan ng Wika observance. The agency organizes events promoting the local language and Filipino nationalism. Schools customarily hold "costume" events as in the culminating day for the month-long event, where students wear traditional Filipino clothing, and events include Original Pilipino Music singing and traditional Filipino dance competitions.
