= Janine Teñoso =

Filipino singer and songwriter (born 1999)

Janine
- Born: Janine Kris Teñoso; January 11, 1999 (age 27); Manila, Philippines
- Occupations: Singer; songwriter
- Musical career
- Genre: Pop
- Instruments: Vocals; guitar
- Years active: 2016–present
- Labels: Vicor; Viva

Janine Kris Teñoso (born January 11, 1999), also known mononymously as Janine, is a Filipino singer and songwriter. She rose to fame when she became a finalist in the singing competition Born to Be a Star (2016), and later gained popularity with her own cover version of the Itchyworms's hit "Di Na Muli" for the film Sid and Aya (2017).

Since 2016, she has been managed by Viva Artists Agency.

== Early life ==
Janine Kris Teñoso was born on January 11, 1999, in Manila, Philippines. She began her involvement in music through her church's worship ministry, where she started writing songs and performing in church music activities.

== Career ==
She wrote her first song "Fall", when she was 17 years old. In later years, she participated in various singing competitions during her high school years.

She later joined the reality singing competition Born to Be a Star as a contestant and later became a finalist in 2016. Afterwards, she was signed with Viva Entertainment.

In 2017, her popularity came to rise when she was chosen to sing a cover version of Rivermaya's "214" as the official song of the movie 100 Tula Para Kay Stella. This was followed by a cover version of the 2016 PhilPop Awards winning song "Di Na Muli" for the film Sid & Aya: Not a Love Story.

In 2023, she collaborated with pop rock band Cup of Joe for the hit song "Tingin". It later entered into the Top 10 on Billboard Philippines' Top Philippine Songs chart.

In 2024, she released her debut extended play (EP) Apat na Buwan, featuring the lead single of the same title.

== Discography ==
=== Extended plays ===
List of extended plays, with selected details
Title	EP details
Apat na Buwan	Released: September 6, 2024; Label: Vicor Music, Viva Records; Formats: Digital download, streaming

=== Singles ===
- "Fall"
- "214"
- "Di Na Muli"
- "Tingin" (with Cup of Joe)
- "Apat na Buwan"
- "Hulaan"
- "Puso"

== Awards and nominations ==
Award	Year	Category	Recipient(s)	Result	Ref.
New Hue Video Music Awards	2025	EP of the Year	Apat na Buwan	Won	
Wish Music Awards	2023	Wish Song Collaboration of the Year	"Tingin"	Won	
