= Billboard Philippines Women in Music =

Philippine music award

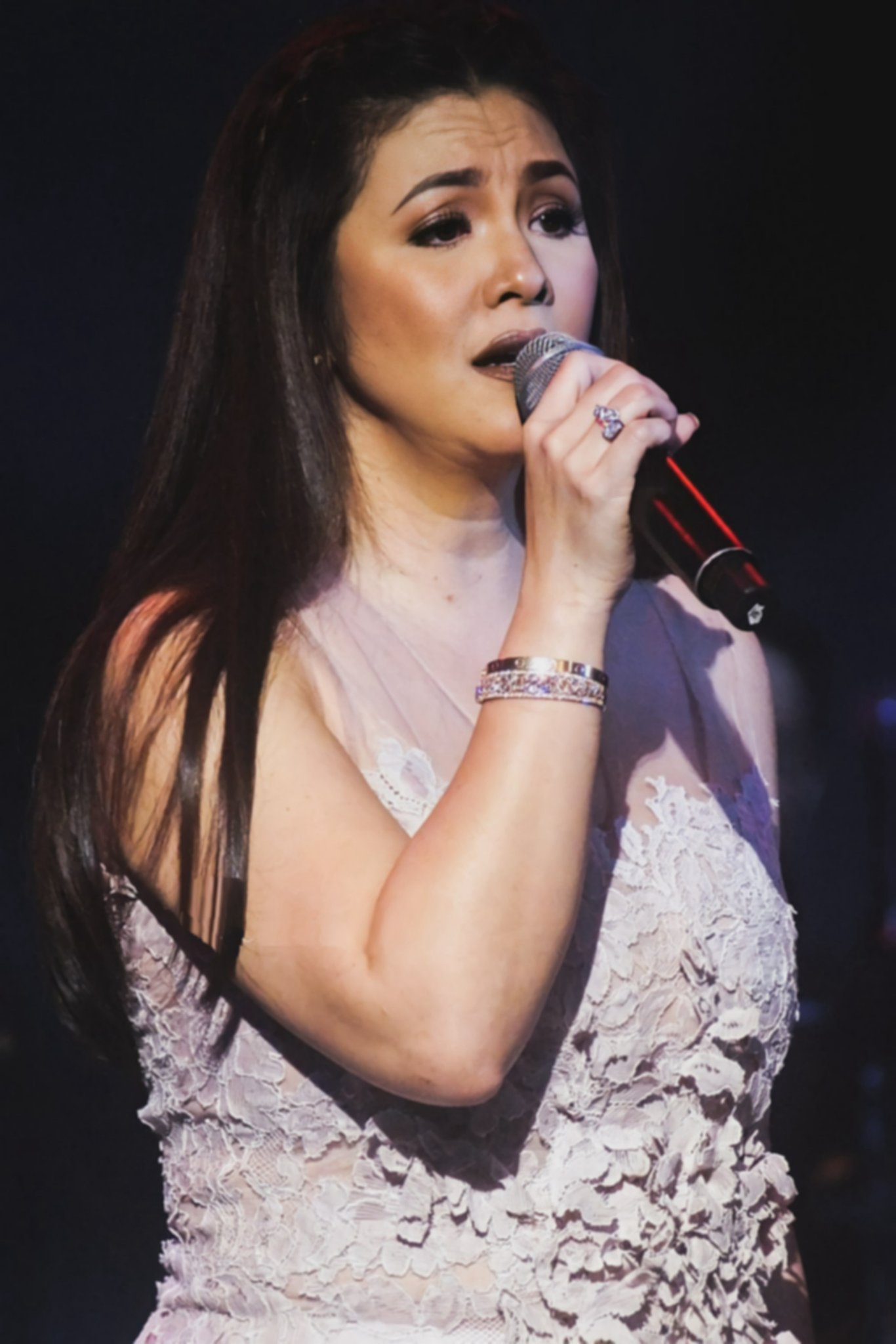
- Regine Velasquez, the most recent Woman of the Year honoree.
- Awarded for: Contributions to the Philippine music industry by women
- Country: Philippines
- Presented by: Billboard Philippines
- First award: 2024
- Currently held by: Regine Velasquez (Woman of the Year)
- Website: billboardphilippines.com/c/women-in-music/

Billboard Philippines Women in Music is an annual event organized by Billboard Philippines that recognizes the most influential women in Filipino music. As the Philippine edition of Billboard's Women of the Year event, it mirrors its American counterpart by featuring a main accolade titled Woman of the Year. The inaugural ceremony took place on March 22, 2024, with Sarah Geronimo being honored as the Woman of the Year.

== History ==
After the inaugural Billboard Women in Music event in 2007, the awards were presented to artists of different nationalities who achieved success on the magazine's charts. In 2023, Billboard introduced its first international edition outside the United States, the Billboard Latin Women in Music, dedicated to recognizing achievements in Latin music. In 2024, the Billboard Women in Music ceremony introduced the Global Force Award, honoring "singers, songwriters, instrumentalists, and producers making groundbreaking contributions to the music industry". Recipients are selected by Billboard's international editions, including Sarah Geronimo, who was chosen by Billboard Philippines. Following this, Billboard expanded the Women in Music ceremonies to individual international editions of the magazine, including Billboard Philippines.

== Woman of the Year Award ==
In 2024, Sarah Geronimo was the first to receive the Woman of the Year award during the event's inauguration. Since then, Billboard Philippines has honored a Filipino female artist with the award every year. The most recent honoree is Regine Velasquez.

- 2024: Sarah Geronimo
- 2025: BINI
- 2026: Regine Velasquez

== Other awards ==
=== Icon Award ===
The Icon award honors a Filipina artist "whose musical work has led them to attain exceptional achievements as well as aided them in making momentous contributions within the music industry and towards the essence of Filipino artistry itself." It was first awarded to Pilita Corrales in 2024.

- 2024: Pilita Corrales
- 2026: Lolita Carbon

=== Powerhouse Award ===
The Powerhouse award honors a Filipina artist "whose music has undisputedly shown utmost superiority when it comes to factors such as streaming, CD and ticket sales, as well as extensive radio play in the Philippines." Regine Velasquez was the first honoree in 2024.

- 2024: Regine Velasquez
- 2026: BINI

=== Hitmaker Award ===
First awarded to Moira dela Torre in 2024, the Hitmaker award is handed to "a Filipina artist whose musical work has caused significant changes and wielded influence on Filipino culture."

- 2024: Moira dela Torre
- 2026: Yeng Constantino

=== Rising Star Award ===
The Hitmaker award honors "those whose work and artistry has aided them in attaining an undeniable rise in the local music scene." Girl group BINI was the first recipient of the award in 2024.

- 2024: BINI
- 2026: G22

=== Rule Breaker Award ===
According to Billboard Philippines, the Rule Breaker award is bestowed upon "a Filipina artist who has consistently torn down barriers alongside defying typical expectations within the music industry; demonstrating a strong resolve to impart a powerful message to the younger generation." Ena Mori received the inaugural award in 2024.

- 2024: Ena Mori
- 2026: KZ Tandingan

=== Executive of the Year Award ===
During the second iteration of the award in 2025, Billboard Philippines honored "the Filipina female executives who have significantly molded the music industry in various ways, even amplifying the voices of Filipino talent on both the local and international stage." Six executives have been honored that year.

- 2025: Rhiza Pascual (Management, Concerts, and Live Entertainment), Atty. Marivic Benedicto (Music Rights), Audry Dionisio (Independent Record Labels), Kathleen Dy-Go (OPM Vanguard), Georgette Tengco (Music Distribution), Roslyn Reyes Pineda (Industry and Record Label)

== Fan-voted awards ==
One of the key differences of Billboard Philippines Women in Music from its American counterpart is the presence of two fan-voted awards. The People's Choice Award is given to an artist chosen by the readers, while the Listeners' Choice Award is given to a song by a Filipina artist, also voted by readers.

Winners are listed first, highlighted in boldface.

=== People's Choice Award ===
==== 2024 ====
- **Morissette**
  - Armi Millare
  - Nadine Lustre
  - Yeng Constantino
  - KZ Tandingan
  - Barbie Almalbis

==== 2026 ====
- **Ashtine Olviga**
  - Mika Salamanca
  - BINI
  - Jikamarie
  - Jolianne
  - Janine Teñoso

=== Listeners' Choice Award ===
==== 2024 ====
- **"Bugambilya" — Belle Mariano**
  - "Hinahanap-hanap" — Jikamarie
  - "Just Because" — Mrld
  - "Tsada Mahigugma" — Maymay Entrata
  - "Sitwasyonship" — Janine Berdin
  - "Sabik" — DENȲ ft. Arthur Nery
  - "B.A.D" — Denise Julia ft. P-Lo
  - "Glue Song" — Beabadoobee
  - "Kisame" — Rhodessa
  - "Delikado" — dwta

==== 2026 ====
- **"TANGA" — KAIA**
  - "Baduy" — VVINK
  - "Nasusunog (Pants On Fire) — dwta
  - "BWYB" — SHNTI, Zae
  - "Isang Linggong Maghihintay" — SUYEN
  - "Funny" — Ena Mori

== See also ==
- Billboard Women in Music
