= Saint Louis University Basic Education School =

Private school in Baguio, Philippines

Location
- High School: Claro M. Recto St., Navy Base Rd., Saint Joseph Village; Elementary: General Luna Rd., Brgy. Lower General Luna; Baguio, Philippines, Benguet

Information
- Former name: Boy's High School; Laboratory Elementary School; Laboratory High School
- Type: Private, Nonsectarian
- Religious affiliation: Roman Catholic
- Established: 1911
- Principal: Alejandro P. Pablico (Basic Education School)
- Assistant to the Principal: Lorna E. Lucas (Academic Affairs) Mary Jane Pagaypay (Administrative Affairs for Elementary) Roy C. Asignacion (Administrative Affairs for High School)
- Campuses: Gonzaga Campus; Navy Base Campus
- Colors: White and Blue
- Slogan: Be the Best, Bida BEdS!
- Song: SLU Hymn
- Publication: Young Louisian Courier; Alab; Tanglaw Hilaga; The Louisian
- Website: www.slu.edu.ph/beds

Saint Louis University Basic Education School is the unification of the basic education school units of Saint Louis University, a private, Roman Catholic, CICM university located in Baguio City, Philippines. The high school department was originally located at the Gonzaga campus but has since been moved to the Navy Base campus since early 2000s. On the other hand, the elementary department is located at the Gonzaga Campus on General Luna Road.

== Departments ==
=== Elementary Department ===
The Basic Education School - Laboratory Elementary Department (SLU BEdS - Elementary Department) is an elementary school that is a part of Saint Louis University. It was founded in 1911 and had been offering a range of classes from Kindergarten to Sixth Grade to students in the local community since 1915. The school is located on the Gonzaga Campus of Saint Louis University, named after Saint Aloysius de Gonzaga, a Jesuit saint known for his work with young people and his dedication to education.

Over the years, the Elementary Department has grown and developed, offering education to students in the local community.

=== Junior High Department ===
The Junior High Department of Saint Louis University is a coeducational school for students at the junior high level. It was originally established in 1921 as the Saint Louis University Boys' High School and was only for male students. The school's first graduates completed their studies in 1929. In 2003, the school became coeducational, accepting male and female students.

The Junior High Department is located at the Navy Base campus, along with the Senior High Department. The two departments were formerly separately administered but are now unified due to the merging of the Elementary and High School departments. This separation was implemented following the implementation of the K-12 program in the Philippines, which added two years to the country's basic education system.

As a coeducational junior high school, the Junior High Department at SLU offers various academic and extracurricular programs and activities to help students grow and learn.

=== Senior High Department ===
The Senior High Department at Saint Louis University is a coeducational school for students in senior high. It was established following the implementation of the K-12 education curriculum system in the Philippines, which added two years to the country's basic education system. The Senior High Department is located on SLU's Navy Base campus, along with the Junior High Department.

==== Color Codes ====
Each strand has their own unique color for easier identification. The color is mostly seen when the students wear their strand uniform.

As of 2026, after the revision of the curriculum by DEPED, the 3 major strands have been reformed into the following, STEM now divided into two pathways, with CARE being dedicated for medical sciences, and FORGE for technology and science education. ABM is now known as ASCEND and HUMMS has also been reformed into SHAPE. By 2027, the school will fully transition with the new pathways as Class of 2027 graduates being the final batch to use the three tracks.

Strand	Color
CARE AND FORGE formerly known as STEM	Green with Diamond Patch
ASCEND formerly known as ABM	Yellow with Diamond Patch
SHAPE formerly known as HUMMS	Royal Blue with Diamond Patch

== Facilities ==
The SLU - BEdS Elementary Department is currently housed at the Gonzaga Campus of Saint Louis University. It consists of the St. Aloysius de Gonzaga Building, Fr. Ghisleen de Vos Building and Msgr. William Brasseur Building.

The SLU - BEdS High School Department, on the other hand, is currently housed at the Navy Base Campus of Saint Louis University. It consists of the Charles Pieters Building, John Van Bauwel Building (formerly Fr. Gerard Linssen Building) and Gerard Decaestecker Building.

== Admission Policy ==
Saint Louis University is a Catholic school that is open to students who live in Baguio and the surrounding area. While the school is primarily for Catholics, non-Catholics are also welcomed to attend, as long as they participate in all of the required religious activities. Students who are dependents of Saint Louis University employees are given priority for admission. In the past, Saint Louis University was only for male students, but in recent years, it has started accepting female students as well.

== School Organizations ==
=== Elementary Department ===
1. Boy Scouts of the Philippines
2. Girl Scouts of the Philippines
3. LPC (Louisian Pupil Council)

=== Junior High Department ===
1. Girl Scouts of the Philippines
2. Boy Scouts of the Philippines
3. CTP (CITIZENSHIP TRAINING PROGRAM) Officers
4. Samahan ng mga Nagkakaisang Mag-aaral (SANAMA - United Student Council)
5. Louisian Junior Police (Inactive since post-pandemic)

=== Senior High Department ===
1. Samahan ng mga Nagkakaisang Mag-aaral (SANAMA - United Student Council)
2. Louisian Rover Scouts

== Campus Ministry ==
Saint Louis University is a Catholic institution guided by the mission of spreading the message of God through love and service to others. Within the university, the Office of the Vice President for Mission and Identity is responsible for ensuring that the university stays true to its mission. The university also has a Campus Ministry that focuses on helping people grow in their faith and have a deeper relationship with Jesus.

The CICM Campus Ministry focuses on Christian formation, which means helping people at the university grow in their faith and have a deeper relationship with Jesus. The Campus Ministry is responsible for three main areas: the Ministry of the Word, which includes evangelization, catechesis (teaching about the Christian faith), guidance, and education; the Ministry of worship; and the Ministry of healing. Another goal of the Campus Ministry is to create a "living encounter with Jesus" on campus through these different ministries. The Campus Ministry works to achieve this goal by collaborating with school administrators, faculty, students, and other stakeholders and by following the guidance of the Office of the Vice President for Mission and Identity. The Campus Ministry also plans and leads activities throughout the year to help people at the university grow in their faith and live out Christian values.
