= Multo (song) =

2024 single by Cup of Joe

Single by Cup of Joe

from the album Silakbo
- Language: Filipino
- English title: Ghost
- Released: September 14, 2024
- Genre: Synth-pop; pop rock
- Length: 3:57
- Label: Viva
- Songwriters: Raphaell Ridao; Redentor Immanuel Ridao
- Producer: Shadiel Chan

Cup of Joe singles chronology
"Lahat ng Bukas (with Keanna Mag)" (2024)	"Multo" (2024)	"Sandali" (2025)

Music video
- "Multo" on YouTube

"Multo" (lit. 'Ghost') is a song by Filipino band Cup of Joe from their debut studio album, Silakbo (2025), and was released as a single in 2024. Written by co-lead vocalist Raphaell Ridao and his brother Redentor during the COVID-19 pandemic, the synth-pop and pop-rock sentimental ballad explores themes of grief, emotional haunting, and self-reflection. Produced by Shadiel Chan, the song marked a more introspective direction in the band's musical style. It was released on September 14, 2024, through Viva Records.

The song received favorable reviews from critics, many of whom described it as a significant evolution of Cup of Joe's sound. Commercially, "Multo" became the first song by a Filipino artist to enter the Billboard Global 200, where it peaked at number 80. In the Philippines, it topped three national charts, including the Billboard Philippines Hot 100, where it remained at number one for 33 non-consecutive weeks, setting the record for the longest-running number-one song in the chart's history. Internationally, the song also reached the top 10 in the United Arab Emirates. It received a nomination for People's Choice Awards — Song and won Song of the Year at the Filipino Music Awards 2025. The song also became the most-streamed OPM song on Spotify, surpassing Up Dharma Down's "Tadhana".

== Background and release ==
On February 9 and 10, 2024, Cup of Joe held its first solo concert, Cup of Joe: Seatbelts on!, at the New Frontier Theater in Quezon City. The band also released its single "Lahat ng Bukas" (2024) on February 9, featuring Keanna Mag. In August 2024, Cup of Joe released the music video for their single "Misteryoso" (2024), starring Jhoanna Robles and directed by Justin de Dios. To mark its sixth anniversary, the band unveiled Dos: The Sixth Joenniversary Special, a four‑part live project on September 6.

On September 14, Cup of Joe surprised its fans with the release of "Multo" under Viva Records, after announcing it just three hours before the release. In March 2025, the music video for the track was released, featuring actors Miles Ocampo and Elijah Canlas. "Multo" served as the first single of the band's first album, Silakbo (lit. 'Outburst'), which was released in January 2025.

== Composition and lyrics ==
"Multo" is three minutes and fifty-seven seconds long. It was written by Cup of Joe's co-lead vocalist Raphaell Ridao and his older brother Redentor during the height of the COVID-19 pandemic. According to Ridao, the two were confined to a room and found it difficult to process their emotions after they both experienced losing someone, eventually turning to songwriting as a means of coping. Produced by Shadiel Chan and Jovel Rivera, the song served as an emotional release for both of them, expressing feelings of longing and sadness that had been difficult to confront.

"Multo"
A 24-second sample of the song's chorus, where the lyrics "Pasindi na ng ilaw" and "Minumulto na 'ko ng damdamin ko" can be heard.

Musically, "Multo" is a synth-pop and pop rock ballad, described as melancholic by Elijah Pareño of Rolling Stone Philippines. It addresses themes of moving forward in life while being persistently affected by the memory of a past relationship, highlighting the process of accepting grief and confronting emotional pain. The lyrics "Pasindi na ng ilaw" (lit. 'Turn on the lights') and "Minumulto na 'ko ng damdamin ko" (lit. 'I'm being haunted by my feelings') have been interpreted as a metaphor for the group's artistic evolution, reflecting a shift from a more playful image to a more introspective exploration of their musical identity.

== Reception ==
"Multo" received favorable reviews from music critics, with most of them regarding the song as an evolution for Cup of Joe's sound. Billboard Philippines' Gabriel Saulog wrote that the song "hits you straight in the feels", adding that "sonically, the track itself is a bit more ambitious and experimental for the band, with a hook that lingers deep upon its first full listen". Likewise, the Philippine magazine Metroscene observed that the song offered a "more refined" version of the band's signature sound. They named it as a standout track on Silakbo, explaining, "The maturity of the sound really stands out, and it's almost like the band's growing alongside their music." Elijah Pareño of Rolling Stone Philippines also wrote that "Multo" established Cup of Joe as serious musicians and storytellers. Nylon Manila's Nica Glorioso called the track "a beautiful song that does its job of making people feel what the band intended them to feel", further describing it as "stirring", "evocative", and "haunting yet cathartic".

Commercially, "Multo" debuted at number 181 on the Billboard Global 200 chart in April 2025, becoming the first song by a Filipino act to enter the chart, and later reached number 80. Meanwhile, the track entered at number 74 on the Billboard Global Excl. U.S. chart, where it marked the highest debut for a Filipino song as well as the first one to enter the top 100 of that chart, later peaking at number 33. In the Philippines, it topped the Philippines Hot 100 and Top Philippine Songs chart for 33 non-consecutive weeks and 38 non-consecutive weeks, respectively, making it the longest number one song in both chart's history. It was overtaken by the song "The Fate of Ophelia" by American singer-songwriter Taylor Swift in the week of October 18, 2025, during which "Multo" was relegated to No. 3. "Multo" also helped Cup of Joe become the first Filipino artist to reach more than 8.3 million monthly listeners on Spotify. The song had an impact on Filipino pop culture as well, with Nylon Manila and ABS-CBN News reporting that "Multo" had become a nearly inescapable viral trend online.

In December 2025, Spotify Philippines declared "Multo" as the Top Local Song of the year. It was also recognized by Apple Music Philippines as its Top OPM Song of 2025.

As of February 19, 2026, "Multo" surpassed Up Dharma Down's "Tadhana" as the most streamed OPM song of all time on Spotify, by roughly 100,000 streams.

== In other media ==
The Filipino teen romance series Ang Mutya ng Section E (transl. The Jewel of Section E) featured "Multo" in its second season. In 2026, Cup of Joe released a stripped-down version of "Multo" for the trailer and soundtrack of romantic drama film The Loved One.

== Listicles ==
Publisher	Year	Listicle	Placement	Ref.
Billboard Philippines	2025	8 Anthems For Those Not Ready To Move On	Placed	
Billboard Philippines	2025	10 OPM Songs for Reflection and New Beginnings	Placed	

== Accolades ==
Award	Year	Category	Result	Ref.
Filipino Music Awards	2025	People’s Choice Awards: Song	Nominated	
Filipino Music Awards	2025	Song of the Year	Won	
P-pop Music Awards	2025	Song of the Year	Nominated	
PMPC Star Awards for Music	2026	Song of the Year	Nominated	
PMPC Star Awards for Music	2026	Duo/Group Artist of the Year	Nominated	
Wish Music Awards	2026	Wishclusive Rock/Alternative Performance of the Year	Won	
Wish Music Awards	2026	Wishclusive Rock/Alternative Song of the Year	Won	

== Credits and personnel ==
Credits are adapted from Spotify.

- Cup of Joe – vocals, arranger
- Raphaell Ridao – songwriter, arranger
- Redentor Immanuel Ridao – songwriter, arranger
- Shadiel Chan – arranger, producer
- Jovel Rivera – producer

== Charts ==
=== Weekly charts ===
Weekly chart performance for "Multo"
Chart (2025)	Peak position
Global 200 (Billboard)	80
Indonesia (Billboard)	25
Philippines (IFPI)	1
Philippines Hot 100 (Billboard Philippines)	1
Philippines Top Songs (Billboard Philippines)	1
Singapore Regional (RIAS)	16
United Arab Emirates (IFPI)	10

=== Year-end charts ===
2025 year-end chart performance for "Multo"
Chart (2025)	Position
Philippines Hot 100 (Billboard Philippines)	1
Philippines Top Songs (Billboard Philippines)	1
