= Silakbo (album) =

Studio album by Cup of Joe
- Released: January 17, 2025
- Length: 38:40
- Language: Filipino
- Label: Viva
- Producers: Jovel Rivera; Shadiel Chan

Cup of Joe chronology
Patutunguhan (2023)	Silakbo (2025)	Sandali (2026)

Singles from Silakbo
- 1. "Multo" Released: September 14, 2024

Silakbo (lit. 'Outburst') is the debut studio album of the Filipino pop rock band Cup of Joe. It was released on January 17, 2025, under Viva Records. It won Album of the Year at the Filipino Music Awards 2025.

== Background and release ==
Following the release of their EP Patutunguhan (2023), which introduced songs like "Estranghero" (Stranger) and "Tingin" (Look) collaboration with Janine Teñoso, Filipino pop-rock band Cup of Joe began working on their first full-length studio album. The band announced their debut studio album, Silakbo, in late 2024 and officially released on January 17, 2025, under Viva Records.

The lead single, "Multo" (Ghost), was released ahead of the album on September 14, 2024. To promote Silakbo, Cup of Joe held a two-night concert at the Araneta Coliseum on February 8 and 9, 2025, both of which sold out. A regional tour followed, with stops in Davao City (March 22), Cebu City (March 29), and their hometown of Baguio.

== Composition and lyrics ==
Silakbo is a concept album that journeys through the five stages of grief—denial, anger, bargaining, depression, and acceptance, as introduced by Swiss-American psychiatrist Elisabeth Kübler-Ross. Each stage is represented by a pair of songs, reflecting the emotional highs and lows of healing and self-discovery. As explained in a Billboard Philippines track-by-track guide, the band used this structure to give listeners an immersive and cathartic experience.

== Track listing ==
Silakbo track listing
No.	Title	Writer(s)	Producer(s)	Length
1.	"Bagyo"	Raphaell Ridao	Shadiel Chan	3:47
2.	"Wine"	Gian Bernardino, Raphaell Ridao, Gab Fernandez, Moon Cairo Peralta	Jovel Rivera	3:38
3.	"Kanelang Mata"	Raphaell Ridao	Jovel Rivera	3:29
4.	"Bubog"	Gian Bernardino	Jovel Rivera	4:16
5.	"Siping"	Gian Bernardino	Jovel Rivera	4:14
6.	"Pahina"	Gian Bernardino, Gabriel Fernandez, Raphaell Ridao, CJ Fernandez	Jovel Rivera	4:04
7.	"Multo"	Raphaell Ridao, Redentor Immanuel Ridao	Shadiel Chan	3:57
8.	"Di Maaari"	Gian Bernardino, Xen Gareza	Shadiel Chan	4:00
9.	"Hinga"	Gian Bernardino, Raphaell Ridao, Gabriel Fernandez	Jovel Rivera	4:13
10.	"Silakbo"	Gian Bernardino, Raphaell Ridao, Gabriel Fernandez, CJ Fernandez	Jovel Rivera	3:56
Total length:				38:40

== Awards and nominations ==
Award	Year (Note: Indicates the year of the ceremony. Each year is linked to the article about the awards held that year, wherever possible.)	Category	Result	Ref.
Awit Awards	2026	Album of the Year	Pending	
Awit Awards	2026	Best Sound Engineered Recording	Pending	
Filipino Music Awards	2025	Album of the Year	Won	

== Listicles ==
Name of publisher, year listed, name of listicle, and placement
Publisher	Year	Listicle	Placement	Ref.
Billboard Philippines	2025	Favorite Albums of 2025	Placed	
Billboard Philippines	2025	25 Best Filipino Albums and EPs of 2025	Placed	
Manila Bulletin	2025	Favorite OPM albums of 2025	Placed	
