= Billboard Philippines =

Philippine edition of the Billboard magazine

- October 15, 2023 cover featuring SB19
- Editor-in-chief: Bret Jackson
- Categories: Music; Entertainment
- Frequency: Bimonthly
- Publisher: Anne Bernisca
- Founded: September 15, 2016; 9 years ago (under Algo-Rhythm Communications)
- First issue: September 15, 2016 (first run); October 15, 2023 (relaunch)
- Company: Modern Media Group (2016–2018); Penske Media Corporation (2023–present)
- Country: Philippines
- Based in: Metro Manila
- Language: English
- Website: billboardphilippines.com
- ISSN: 2984-9861

Billboard Philippines (also shortened as Billboard PH) is a Philippine music and entertainment media brand and magazine owned by Modern Media Group, serving as the local edition of the Billboard magazine. It publishes news, video, opinion, reviews, events, and styles related to the music industry. It is also known for the Billboard Philippines Hot 100, a record chart that tracks the most popular songs in different genres. It also hosts events and releases magazine issues bimonthly.

It was first launched in September 2016 and operated under Algo-Rhythm Communications until 2018 when it ceased operations for undisclosed reasons. In 2023, it was announced that the magazine would be relaunched under a different owner, Modern Media Group. It officially made its return on October 15, 2023.

== History ==
=== 2016–2018: Algo-Rhythm Communications ===
Billboard Philippines was first announced in June 2016. It was officially launched on September 15, 2016, under Algo-Rhythm Communications in partnership with Billboard.

On June 10, 2017, after months of formulations, it announced three weekly music charts: Philippine Hot 100, Philippine Top 20, and Catalog Chart. The first chart was published on June 12, 2017, coinciding with the 119th Philippine Independence Day. All charts were published every Monday.

Billboard Philippines ceased publication on January 15, 2018. The editor-in-chief Francis Reyes and Algo-Rhythm Communications did not release an official statement regarding their inactivity.

=== 2023–present: Relaunch under Modern Media Group ===
The Philippines did not have existing music charts after the brand's cessation in 2018 until 2022 when Billboard launched on February 14, 2022, the Hits of the World, a collection of charts around the world that ranks the top 25 songs weekly in more than 40 countries around the globe; part of this collection is the Philippines Songs chart.

On May 4, 2023, five years after it ceased publication, it was announced that Billboard Philippines will be relaunched with AGC Power Holdings Corp, the same company that owns Vogue Philippines and Nylon Manila, under its new subsidiary Modern Media Group Inc.

Its first issue under the new owner came out on October 15, 2023, featuring SB19 and Regine Velasquez as the cover artists. Bret Jackson is the editor-in-chief, while Francis Reyes returned as the editor-at-large. Media Channels, Billboard Philippines' collection of original series, were also introduced. These include Billboard Soundwaves, featuring weekly performances of an artist's hit single on a cyclorama stage; Billboard Volume, a weekly podcast; and Billboard Studio, where guest artist performs three songs and is released every second and last Thursday of the month.

At the 2024 Women in Music event, Sarah Geronimo became the first Filipino-born artist to be honored by Billboard with the Global Force Award after being nominated by Billboard Philippines. On February 28 of the same year, the local edition of the awards event has been unveiled by Billboard Philippines.

== Charts ==
=== Singles and tracks ===
Title	Type	Positions	Description
Philippines Hot 100	digital downloads + sales + streaming	100	Ranks the top local and international songs in the country.; First introduced on June 12, 2017, the chart was discontinued in January 2018 after the magazine ceased its operations for undisclosed reasons.; Reintroduced in July 2024 after the magazine was relaunched under new management in 2023.
Top Philippine Songs	sales + streaming	25	Ranks the top 25 Filipino songs in the country.; Launched in July 2024.
Top P-pop Songs	digital downloads + sales + streaming	10	Ranks the top 10 P-pop songs based on their performance on the Philippines Hot 100 chart.; Launched in June 2025 and updated monthly.
Top Rock Songs	digital downloads + sales + streaming	10	Ranks the top 10 rock songs based on their performance on the Philippines Hot 100 chart.; Launched in June 2025 and updated monthly.

=== Discontinued charts ===
Title	Discontinuation date	Type	Positions	Description
Catalog Chart	January 2018	digital downloads + streaming + video playback	100	Ranked the top songs that are older than three years but are still being streamed, viewed, and downloaded.; First introduced on June 12, 2017, the chart was discontinued in January 2018 after the magazine ceased its operations for undisclosed reasons.
K-pop Top 5	—N/a		5	Ranked the top 5 K-pop songs in the country.; Launched on September 15, 2017.
Philippine Top 20	January 2018	digital downloads + streaming + video playback	20	Ranked the top 20 Filipino songs in the country.; First introduced on June 12, 2017, the chart was discontinued in January 2018 after the magazine ceased its operations for undisclosed reasons.
Top 20 Social Chart	July 2017	social media activity	20	Ranked the top 20 Filipino recording artists based on their social media activity and presence on selected social media platforms.; First issued in September 2016 for the month of August, the chart was updated monthly.; The chart was last issued in July 2017, with no subsequent releases published for unknown reasons.

== See also ==
- Billboard Philippines Women in Music
- Hits of the World
- Philippines Songs
