= IV of Spades discography =

- Studio albums: 3
- Singles: 19
- Promotional singles: 4
- Music videos: 12

Filipino band IV of Spades has released two studio albums, nineteen singles, four promotional singles, and twelve music videos. The group consists of vocalist and bassist Zild Benitez, vocalist and lead guitarist Blaster Silonga, and drummer Badjao de Castro. Former lead vocalist and rhythm guitarist Unique Salonga was part of the original lineup until his departure in 2018, later returning to the band in 2025.

== Albums ==
=== Studio albums ===
List of studio albums, with selected details
Title	Details
ClapClapClap!	Released: January 18, 2019 (PHL); Label: Warner Music Philippines; Formats: Digital download, CD, streaming
Andalucia	Released: November 5, 2025; Label: Sony Music Philippines; Formats: Digital download, streaming, vinyl record, CD
Tropical Dream	Releases: December 9, 2026; Label: Sony Music Philippines; Formats: TBA

== Singles ==
=== As lead artist ===
List of singles, showing year released, selected chart positions, and associated albums
Title	Year	Peak chart positions		Album
Title	Year	PHL	SGP	Album
"Ilaw Sa Daan"	2016	—	—	Non-album singles
"Hey Barbara"	2017	—	—	Non-album singles
"Where Have You Been, My Disco?"	2017	—	—	Non-album singles
"Mundo"	2018	25	—	Non-album singles
"In My Prison"	2018	—	—	ClapClapClap!
"Bata, Dahan-Dahan!"	2018	—	—	ClapClapClap!
"Take That Man"	2018	—	—	ClapClapClap!
"Bawat Kaluluwa"	2019	—	—	ClapClapClap!
"Come Inside of My Heart"	2019	38	— (Note: "Come Inside of My Heart" did not enter RIAS Top Streaming Chart, but peaked at number 24 on the Top Regional Chart.)	ClapClapClap!
"Nagbabalik" (with Rico Blanco)	2019	—	—	Non-album singles
"Ang Pinagmulan"	2020	—	—	Non-album singles
"Sariling Multo (Sa Panaginip)"	2020	—	—	Non-album singles
"Aura"	2025	4	—	Andalucia
"Nanaman"	2025	—	—	Andalucia
"Konsensya"	2025	87	—	Andalucia
"Suliranin"	2025	—	—	Andalucia
"Isang Pag-ibig"	2026	—	—	Tropical Dream
"Rollercoaster"	2026	—	—	Tropical Dream
"Susundan"	2026	—	—	Tropical Dream
"—" denotes releases that did not chart or were not released in that region.

=== Promotional singles ===
List of promotional singles, showing year released and album name
Title	Year	Album
"Sa Kahapon" (with Shanti Dope)	2018	Coke Studio Homecoming
"Bata, Dahan-Dahan! x Nadarang" (with Shanti Dope)	2018	Coke Studio Homecoming
"Namamasko Po" (with Shanti Dope)	2018	Coke Studio Homecoming
"Kung Ayaw Mo Wag Mo" (Note: "Kung Ayaw Mo Wag Mo" was originally sung by Rivermaya.) (Recorded at Kodama Studios, Philippines)	2019	Spotify Jams

=== Other charted songs ===
List of other charted songs, showing year released, selected chart positions, and associated albums
Title	Year	Peak chart positions	Album
Title	Year	PHL	Album
"Kabisado"	2025	6	Andalucia
"—" denotes releases that did not chart or were not released in that region.

== Guest appearances ==
List of non-single guest appearances, showing year released, other artist(s) featured, and album name
Title	Year	Other artist(s)	Album
"Huli Na Ba Ang Lahat"	2018	Moira Dela Torre	Wish 107.5 FM Bus
"Same Ground" (Note: "Same Ground" was originally sung by Kitchie Nadal.)	2018	Moira Dela Torre	Wish 107.5 FM Bus

== Music videos ==
List of music videos, showing year released and directors
Title	Year	Director(s)	Ref.
As lead artist
"Ilaw Sa Daan"	2017	Myca Guinchoma	
"Hey Barbara"	2017	Myca Guinchoma	
"Where Have You Been, My Disco?"	2017	Raymond Dacones	
"In My Prison"	2018	Raymond Dacones	
"Bata, Dahan-Dahan!"	2018	Raymond Dacones	
"Take That Man"	2018	Shaira Luna	
"Bawat Kaluluwa"	2019	Raymond Dacones	
"Nagbabalik" (with Rico Blanco)	2019	RA Rivera	
"Come Inside of My Heart"	2019	Raymond Dacones and Trina Razon	
"Ang Pinagmulan"	2020	Raymond Dacones and Trina Razon	
"Sariling Multo (Sa Panaginip)"	2020	Daniel Aguilar (Editor)	
"Aura"	2025	Raliug	
"Nanaman"	2025	Kris Cazin	
"Konsensya"	2025	Raliug	
"Suliranin"	2025	Kris Cazin and Unique Salonga	
"Monster"	2025	Kris Cazin	
"Isang Pag-Ibig"	2026	Kris Cazin	
"Rollercoaster"	2026	Kris Cazin	
"Susundan"	2026	Kris Cazin	
