= Zild Benitez discography =

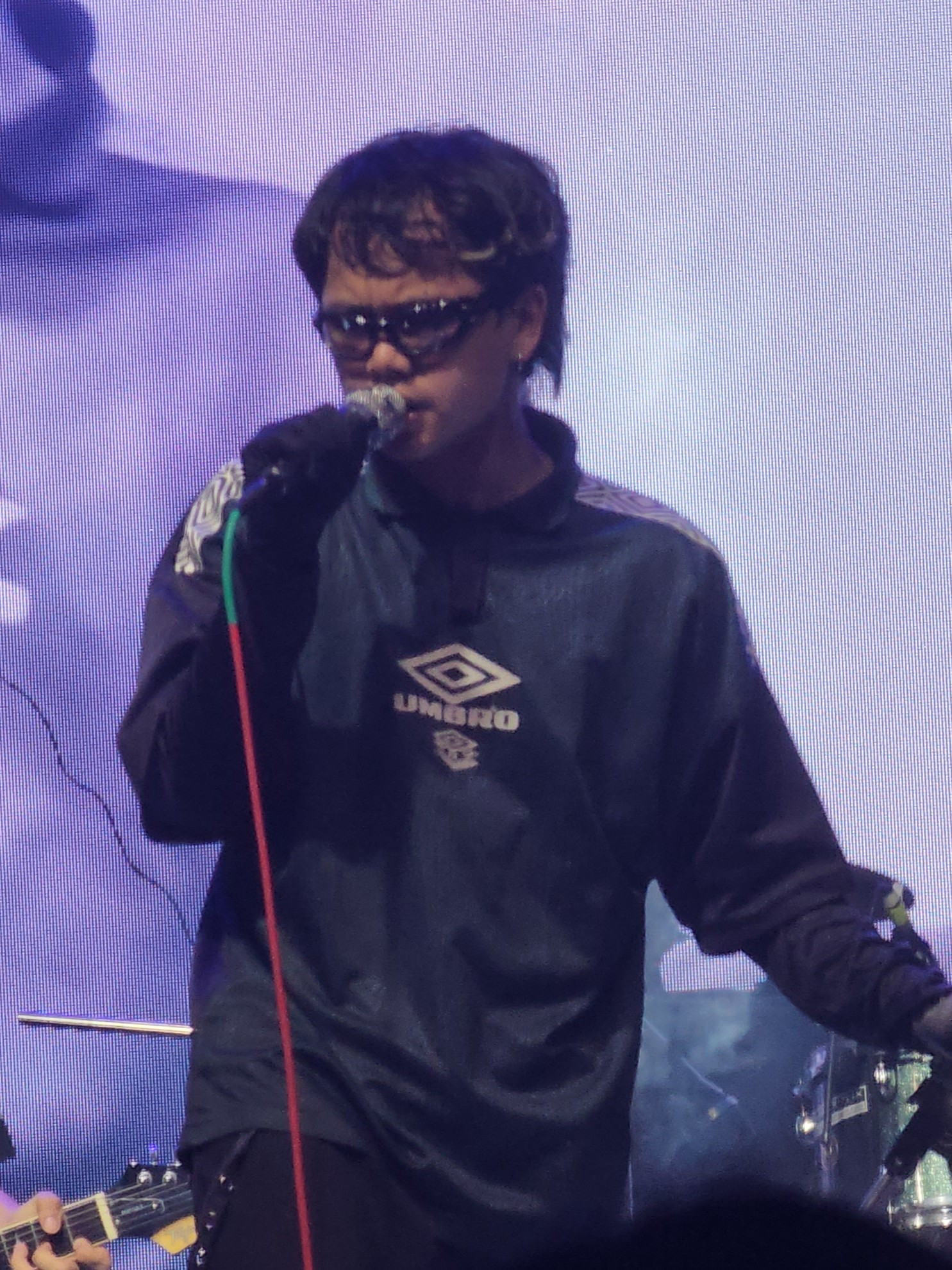
- Benitez performing in 2024
- Studio albums: 4
- Singles: 20
- Music videos: 16

Daniel Zildjian Garon Benitez, mononymously known as Zild has released four studio albums, twenty singles, and sixteen music videos.

After an indefinite hiatus of the rock band IV of Spades in 2020, Benitez released his debut studio, Homework Machine. He released his second studio album, Huminga, on April 8, 2021. He then released his third studio album, Medisina, on October 28, 2022. His fourth studio album, Superpower was released on August 9, 2024.

== Studio Albums ==
=== As a solo artist ===
List of Studio Albums with Selected Details
Title	Album Details	Ref.
Homework Machine	Released: August 6, 2020; Label: Warner Music Philippines; Format: Digital download, streaming media	
Huminga	Released: April 8, 2021; Label: Warner Music Philippines; Format: Digital download, streaming media, 12", vinyl, CD	
Medisina	Released: October 28, 2022; Label: Island Records Philippines UMG Philippines; Format: Digital download, streaming media, 12", vinyl, CD	
Superpower	Released: August 9, 2024; Label: Island Records Philippines UMG Philippines; Format: Digital download, streaming media, 12", vinyl	

=== with IV of Spades ===
Title	Album Details	Ref.
CLAPCLAPCLAP!	Released: January 18, 2019; Label: Warner Music Philippines; Format: Digital download, streaming media, 12", CD	
Andalucia	Released: November 5, 2025; Label: Sony Music Philippines; Formats: Digital download, streaming, vinyl record	

== Singles ==
=== As a solo artist ===
List of singles as lead artist, showing year released and album name
Title	Year	Peak chart positions	Album
Title	Year	PHL	Album
"Sinungaling"	2020	—	Homework Machine
"Dila"	2020	—	Homework Machine
"Habulan"	2020	—	Homework Machine
"Alalahanin"	2020	—	Homework Machine
"Takbo Ng Panahon"	2020	—	Homework Machine
"Ibang Planeta"	2020	—	Himig Handog 2020
"Luha ng Lupa"	2020	—	Non-album single
"Kyusi"	2021	—	Huminga
"Apat"	2021	—	Huminga
"Bungantulog"	2021	—	Huminga
"Huminga"	2021	—	Huminga
"Hele"	2021	—	Huminga
"Isang Anghel"	2022	—	Medisina
"Duwag"	2022	—	Medisina
"Duda"	2022	—	Medisina
"Medisina"	2022	—	Medisina
"Dasal/Kasal"	2022	—	Medisina
"Oh Lunes Nanaman"	2022	—	Medisina
"Segurista"	2024	—	Superpower
"Lia"	2024	—	Superpower

=== As a featured artist ===
List of singles as featured artist, showing year released and album name
Title	Year	Peak chart positions	Album
Title	Year	PHL	Album
"Lunod" (with Ben&Ben and Juan Karlos)	2021	—	Pebble House, Vol. 1: Kuwaderno
"Gabi" (with Juan Karlos)	2023	—	Sad Songs and Bullshit Part 1
"Pambihira" (with Kiyo)	2025	—	Non-album single

=== with Manila Magic ===
Title	Year	Album
In The Night	2016	Non-album singles
I Feel Like Dancing	2016	Non-album singles

== Music videos ==
List of music videos, album, showing year released and directors
Title	Album	Year	Director(s)	Ref.
As lead artist
"Sinungaling"	Homework Machine	2020	Daniel Aguilar	
"Dila"	Homework Machine	2020	Daniel Aguilar	
"Habulan"	Homework Machine	2020	Daniel Aguilar	
"Alalahanin"	Homework Machine	2020	Kevin Dayrit	
"Takbo Ng Panahon"	Homework Machine	2020	Shaira Luna	
"Luha Ng Lupa"	Non-album single	2020	Daniel Aguilar	
"Ibang Planeta"	Himig Handog 2020	2021	Shaira Luna	
"Kyusi"	Huminga	2021	Simon Te	
"Apat"	Huminga	2021	Daniel Aguilar	
"Bungantulog"	Huminga	2021	Raymond Dacones and Trina Razon	
"Huminga"	Huminga	2021	Shaira Luna	
"Hele"	Huminga	2021	Daniel Aguilar	
"Isang Anghel"	Medisina	2022	Daniel Aguilar	
"Duwag"	Medisina	2022	Daniel Aguilar	
"Duda"	Medisina	2022	Daniel Aguilar	
"Medisina"	Medisina	2022	Daniel Aguilar	
"Dasal/Kasal"	Medisina	2022	Navid	
"Segurista"	Superpower	2024	Andrew Kyle Aquino	
"Lia"	Superpower	2024	Raliug	
"I.N.A.S."	Superpower	2024		
