= Come Inside of My Heart =

Single by IV of Spades

from the album ClapClapClap!
- Language: English
- Released: October 13, 2019
- Genre: Indie rock
- Length: 4:06
- Label: Warner Music Philippines
- Songwriter: Blaster Mitchell Silonga
- Producer: IV of Spades

IV of Spades singles chronology
"Bawat Kaluluwa" (2019)	"Come Inside of My Heart" (2019)	"Nagbabalik" (2019)

Alternative cover
- 2023 version cover (Note: Sped up and slowed version.)

Music video
- "Come Inside of My Heart" on YouTube

"Come Inside of My Heart" is a single by Filipino band IV of Spades from their debut album ClapClapClap! (2019). It was written by lead guitarist Blaster Mitchell Silonga and released on January 18, 2019, and later became the fifth and final single from their debut album, officially released as a standalone single on October 13, 2019, through Warner Music Philippines.

== Background and release ==
In 2018, IV of Spades rose to mainstream popularity with the breakout success of their single "Mundo". At the height of the song's popularity, the band announced on May 4, 2018, that lead vocalist and rhythm guitarist Unique Salonga had officially left the group to pursue a solo career.

Following Salonga's departure, the group continued as a trio and began recording their debut album ClapClapClap!. Their fifth and final single, "Come Inside of My Heart", written by lead guitarist Blaster Silonga, and first released on January 16, 2019, as part of the album. It later became the fifth and final single from ClapClapClap!, officially released as a standalone single on October 13, 2019, through Warner Music Philippines.

== Composition ==
"Come Inside of My Heart" has a runtime of four minutes and six seconds long, set in the key of B♭ major, with a tempo of 113 beats per minute.

== Commercial performance ==
The song also charted on the Billboard Philippines Hot 100, peaking at No. 65, and reached No. 24 on the RIAS chart in Singapore. A few years after its release, "Come Inside of My Heart" gained viral popularity on TikTok. The song debuted at No. 13 on the TikTok Billboard Top 50, which tracks music discovery and engagement on the platform.

== Credits and personnel ==
Credits are adapted from Apple Music.

- IV of Spades — vocals, producer
- Blaster Mitchell Silonga — songwriter, electric guitar, vocals
- Zild Benitez — bass, vocals, keyboards
- Badjao de Castro — drums

== Charts ==
Chart performance for "Come Inside of My Heart"
Chart (2019)	Peak position
Singapore Regional (RIAS)	24

Chart performance for "Come Inside of My Heart"
Chart (2024–2025)	Peak position
Philippines (Philippines Hot 100)	38
Philippines (Top Philippine Songs)	20
