= Suliranin =

Single by IV of Spades

from the album Andalucia
- Language: Filipino
- Released: October 8, 2025
- Genre: Psychedelic rock
- Length: 4:05
- Label: Sony Philippines
- Composers: IV of Spades; Unique Salonga
- Lyricist: Unique Salonga
- Producers: Brian Lotho; IV of Spades

IV of Spades singles chronology
"Konsensya" (2025)	"Suliranin" (2025)	"Isang Pag-Ibig" (2026)

Music video
- "Suliranin" on YouTube

"Suliranin" (lit. 'Problem') is a single by Filipino band IV of Spades. A follow-up to the group's previous single, "Konsensya", it was surprise-released on October 8, 2025, through Sony Music Philippines. It was written by Unique Salonga and composed it with the band. Produced by IV of Spades and Brian Lotho, it is a psychedelic rock track that discusses how challenges will dissipate as the narrator invites another person to join them in a blissful paradise, overflowing with joy that soars to the sky. The music video was directed by Unique Salonga and Kris Cazin.

== Background and release ==
After the release of the band's previous singles, "Aura", "Nanaman", and "Konsensya", the band surprise-released their fourth single, titled "Suliranin" (lit. 'Problem'), and will be part of their upcoming album, titled Andalucia. The band performed their first full headline concert at the SM Mall of Asia Arena on December 12.

== Composition ==
The track is four minutes and five seconds long and was composed by the band and its lyrics was written by Unique Salonga. It was produced by IV of Spades and Brian Lotho, with Emil Dela Rosa providing as the mastering engineer and mixing engineer, while the latter and Daniel Monong providing as the recording engineer. It is a psychedelic rock track that discusses how challenges will dissipate as the narrator invites another person to join them in a blissful paradise, overflowing with joy that soars to the sky.

Gabriel Saulog of Billboard Philippines stated that the track executes Unique's style signature, and incorporates psychedelic elements that enhance its otherworldly nature, particularly through rising synths and ethereal vocalizations.

== Credits and personnel ==
Credits are adapted from Apple Music.

- IV of Spades – vocals, composer, producer
- Unique Salonga – composer, lyrics
- Brian Lotho – producer
- Emil Dela Rosa – mastering engineer, mixing engineer, recording engineer
- Daniel Monong – recording engineer
