= Sino (song) =

2018 single by Unique

Single by Unique

from the album Grandma
- Language: Tagalog
- English title: Who
- Released: August 6, 2018
- Genre: Indie rock; psychedelic rock
- Length: 4:40
- Label: O/C
- Songwriter(s): Unique
- Producer(s): Unique Salonga

Unique singles chronology
"Midnight Sky" (2018)	"Sino" (2018)	"Lamang Lupa" (2019)

Music video
- "Sino" on YouTube

"Sino" is a song by Filipino singer-songwriter Unique Salonga. It was released as a digital single from his debut album Grandma on August 6, 2018, through O/C Records. Written by Unique, it is an indie rock track that can be interpreted as a love story about a man who is uncertain about his future partner, and may also be about a man who is a rock, unaware of the support he receives.

== Background and release ==
In May 2018, Unique departed from IV of Spades, seeking to pursue "personal endeavors", much to the dismay of fans. On July 13, Unique released his first single, "Midnight Sky", accompanied by a black-and-white music video. The following month, he released his solo debut album Grandma, transitioning his genre from disco to psychedelic rock.

== Composition ==
"Sino" is four minutes and forty seconds long, composed in the key of B with a time signature of 4/4, and has a tempo of 105 beats per minute. The track is the album's catchiest and most accessible track, featuring a dreamy, romantic bass-driven groove, reminiscent of IV of Spades' "Mundo". Written by Unique, it is an indie rock track that can be interpreted as a love story about a man who is uncertain about his future partner, and may also be about a man who is a rock, unaware of the support he receives.

The song originally featured guitars but was removed, added piano, and removed again. Despite multiple attempts, the song was ultimately decided against as it didn't need anything else. Unique said, "Yun na siya eh," implying that sometimes muting is necessary.

== Music video ==
Directed by O/C Records founder Kean Cipriano, it features Unique performing mundane tasks in an abandoned building. The music video maintains Unique's monochrome aesthetic, but breaks the fourth wall by singing directly to the viewers. Unique initially had a different concept, but it didn't work out. The director and his team decided to stick with a simple, random shot of him in random places, aiming for a "symmetrical" vibe for self-exploration.

== Commercial performance ==
After nearly seven years of its release, "Sino" debuted at number 79 and peaked at number 34 on the Billboard Philippines Hot 100 chart. It also peaked at number nineteen on the Official Philippines Chart.

After the return of IV of Spades in July 2025, the song entered the Billboard Philippines charts, debuting at number twelve at Top Philippine Songs the following month. On September 24, 2025, the song peaked at number 24 at the Philippines Hot 100.

== Charts ==
Chart performance for "Sino"
Chart (2025)	Peak position
Philippines (IFPI)	19
Philippines (Philippines Hot 100)	24
Philippines (Top Philippine Songs)	12

== Accolades ==
Year	Award	Category	Notable Works	Result	Ref.
2021	6th Wish Music Awards	Wishclusive Rock/Alternative Song of the Year	"Sino"	Won	
