= Andalucia (IV of Spades album) =

Studio album by IV of Spades
- Released: November 5, 2025
- Length: 44:45
- Languages: Filipino, English
- Label: Sony
- Producers: Brian Lotho; IV of Spades

IV of Spades chronology
ClapClapClap! (2019)	Andalucia (2025)	Tropical Dream (2026)

Singles from Andalucia
- 1. "Aura" Released: July 16, 2025; 2. "Nanaman" Released: August 13, 2025; 3. "Konsensya" Released: September 10, 2025; 4. "Suliranin" Released: October 8, 2025

Andalucia is the second studio album by Filipino rock band IV of Spades. It was released on November 5, 2025. The album contains 12 tracks, of which four ("Aura", "Nanaman", "Konsensya", and "Suliranin") were previously released as the singles in 2025, after their return for nearly five years of hiatus. It is also the first album that features their lead vocalist and rhythm guitarist, Unique Salonga since his departure from the band in 2018.

== Background ==
In 2018, Unique Salonga left the band IV of Spades to pursue a solo career, leading the band to continue together as 3 members. In 2019, released their first debut album CLAPCLAPCLAP!, and released two final singles such as "Ang Pinagmulan" and "Sa Panaginip (Sariling Multo)" before the group went on indefinite hiatus on August 21, 2020. Zild Benitez began a solo career and released four albums. In 2021, Blaster Silonga pursued his solo career and released a few singles and two albums.

On July 16, 2025, the band officially returned with the surprise-released single "Aura" under Sony Music Philippines, working with their new management, Balcony Music Entertainment. The song also marked Salonga's return as the band's lead vocalist and rhythm guitarist. Over the next two months, the band continued to singles without prior announcement: on August 13, 2025, "Nanaman" (lit. 'Again'), on September 10, 2025, "Konsensya" (lit. 'Conscience'), and on October 8, 2025, "Suliranin" (lit. 'Problem').

According to Billboard Philippines, "Aura" was met immediate success on streaming services and social media platforms. The track debuted on the magazine's record charts with two days of chart-tracking data, entering at number 28 on the Philippines Hot 100 and number 14 on the Top Philippine Songs. The track peaked at number four on the Philippines Hot 100 and number three on the Top Philippine Songs.

== Music and lyrics ==
The album contains a psychedelic funk sound blended with 1970's inspired sound, explores themes of a journey through toxic relationships, nostalgia, and personal evolution (particularly interpreted on the track "Monster). It weaves together the distinct, individual songwriting styles of each member to share stories of yearning, infidelity, and reconciliation.

== Release ==
On August 29, 2025, at the Wish 107.5 11th anniversary concert, the band announced that they will be releasing their second album Andalucia named after Benitez's apartment where they regularly met. It was released on November 5, 2025, through Sony Music Philippines.

The band performed at the inaugural Filipino Music Awards held on October 21, 2025, at the SM Mall of Asia Arena, marked their comeback and won 'Rock Song of the Year' for their comeback song, "Aura", alongside Zild Benitez's song "I.N.A.S." for 'Alternative Song of the Year".

=== Reception ===
Gabriel Saulog of Billboard Philippines described "Kabisado" as one of Blaster's best-penned tracks, describing Blaster's vocals as "dreamy" and his lyrics as "cheeky".

As of May 30, 2026, "Kabisado" peaked at number six on both of the Billboard Philippines Hot 100 and Top Philippine Songs.

== Track listing ==
All music is composed by IV of Spades.

Andalucia track listing (Note: In the vinyl edition, Side A runs from Monster to Tamis ng Pagkakamali, while Side B runs from Aura to Suliranin.)
No.	Title	Writer(s)	Length
1.	"Tara"	Daniel Zildjian Benitez	3:07
2.	"Monster"	Unique Salonga; Daniel Zildjian Benitez; Blaster Silonga	3:00
3.	"Paru-paro"	Daniel Zildjian Benitez	3:21
4.	"Nanaman"	Blaster Silonga (Note: As a lyricist)	3:13
5.	"Konsensya"	Daniel Zildjian Benitez	3:33
6.	"Tamis ng Pagkakamali"	Unique Salonga	3:30
7.	"Aura"	Unique Salonga; Daniel Zildjian Benitez; Blaster Silonga; Christian Gabriel de Castro	5:18
8.	"Karma"	Unique Salonga; Daniel Zildjian Benitez; Blaster Silonga	4:06
9.	"Tangerine Boulevard"	Unique Salonga	4:22
10.	"Kabisado"	Blaster Silonga	3:28
11.	"Rewind"	Christian Gabriel De Castro (Note: On streaming platforms, only De Castro is credited.); Carlo Angelo Del Rio; Kim Lemuel Dela Cruz	3:43
12.	"Suliranin"	Unique Salonga	4:05
Total length:			44:45

== Comeback Concert and the Andalucia Tour ==
=== Comeback Concert at SM Mall of Asia Arena (2025) ===
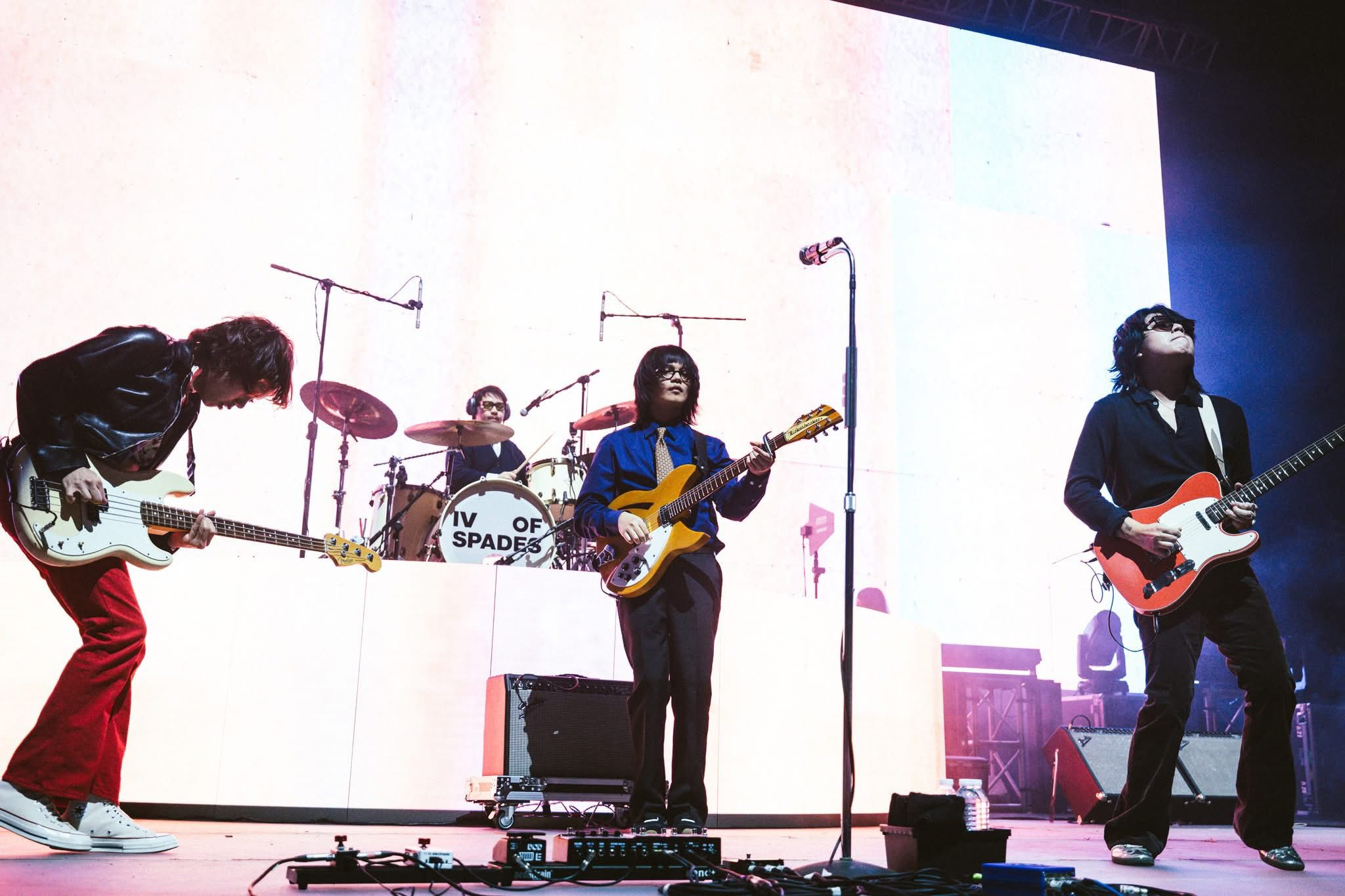
IV OF SPADES Live at SM Mall Of Asia Arena - December 12, 2025

On October 5, 2025, Karpos Multimedia announced that the band was set to perform their comeback concert on December 12, 2025 at SM Mall of Asia Arena. On October 12, 2025, the band uploaded a trailer for their Comeback Concert on YouTube, entitled "12•12•25". It features a teaser of their songs listed on their setlist, including their unreleased, "Sentimental", and songs written during their solo careers. The tickets sales were running low and was sold out immediately in a few days. Due to popular demand, on October 26, 2025, the band announced a second-day concert, scheduled on December 13, 2025. The setlist contained 30 songs, including all the songs from Andalucia, some popular songs from CLAPCLAPCLAP!, their non-album singles, and their solo-era songs, with a total duration of 3 hours of concert. It marked as their first-ever arena show featuring the original members reunited, with new songs performed live for the first time along with the reimagined versions of one of their classic songs, according to Karpos Multimedia.

During the concert, they opened the show by blasting the speakers with "Ecce Homo (A Theme from Mr. Bean)", making the audience applause so loud, before the band kicked off with new materials, "Monster" and "Nanaman". Midway through the show, after the performance of "Tamis ng Pagkakamali", they stepped away from their instruments to perform with acoustic instruments at the other side of the arena. They performed unreleased songs such as "Terminal" and "Okay Lang Ba?". They also entertained fans by playing Tekken through the stage’s LED backdrop before returning onstage.

=== Andalucia Tour (2026) ===
On February 8, 2026, Karpos Multimedia announced an upcoming tour for the band in promotion to the band’s sophomore album. With a teaser posted on Facebook and Instagram, containing 30 songs and 2+ hours, making it a full headline show. The band would be performing in cities nationwide, such as Baguio on May 16, Zamboanga on May 23, Davao on May 31, Sta. Rosa on June 6, Cagayan de Oro on June 27, and Cebu on July 18. The tour date of Baguio was later postponed to August 16, while the concert for Zamboanga was cancelled without any specific reasons.

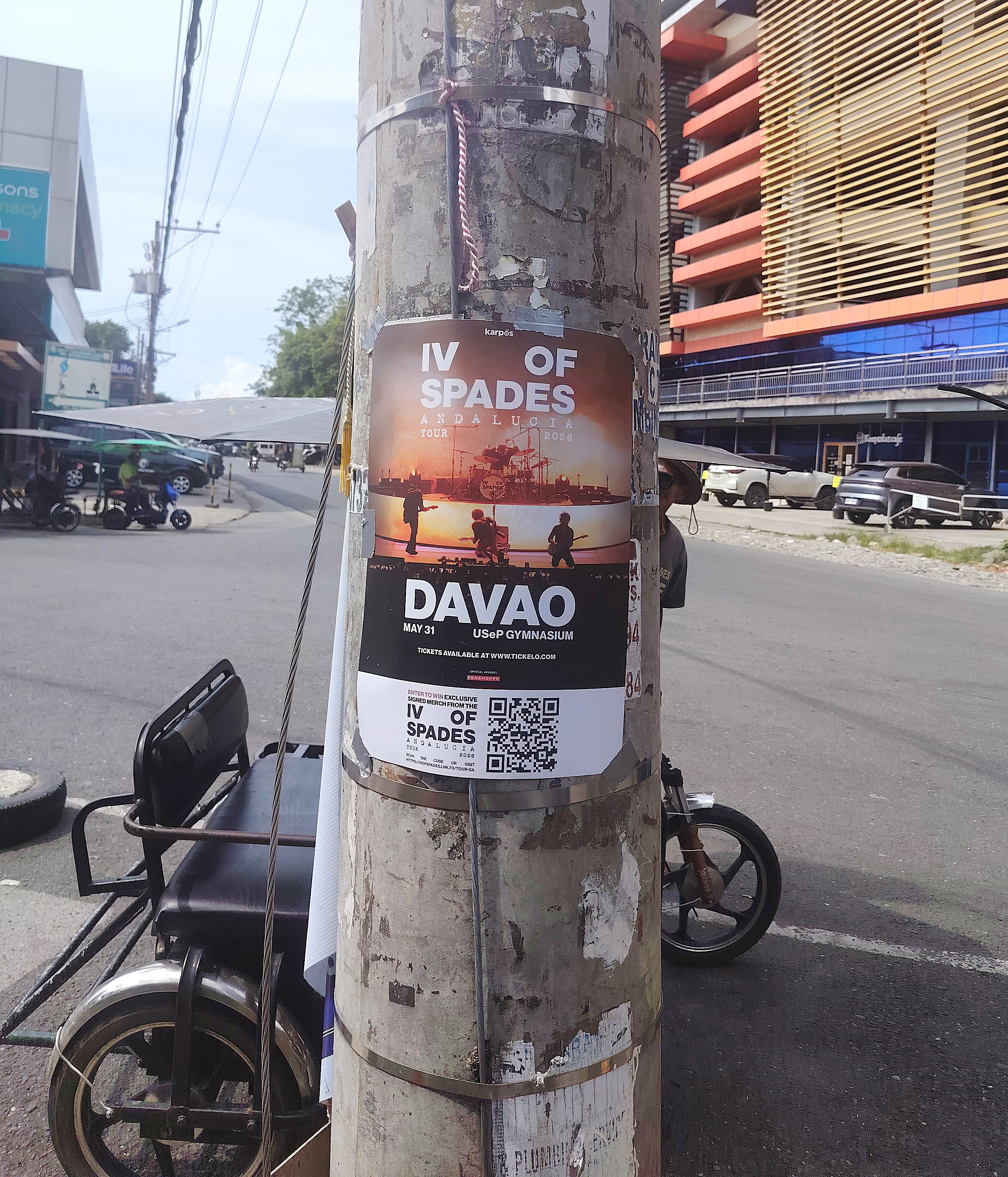
A IV of Spades Andalucia Tour Davao poster in a Davao City street

After their last show ended on August 16 in Baguio, the band commenced to tour in the US and Canada later in October 2026.

== Listicles ==
Name of publisher, year listed, name of listicle, and placement
Publisher	Year	Listicle	Placement	Ref.
Billboard Philippines	2025	25 Best Filipino Albums and EPs of 2025	Placed	
