= Konsensya =

Single by IV of Spades

from the album Andalucia
- Language: Filipino
- Released: September 10, 2025
- Genre: Alternative rock
- Length: 3:33
- Label: Sony Philippines
- Composers: IV of Spades; Daniel Zildjian G. Benitez
- Lyricist: Daniel Zildjian G. Benitez
- Producers: Brian Lotho; IV of Spades

IV of Spades singles chronology
"Nanaman" (2025)	"Konsensya" (2025)	"Suliranin" (2025)

Music video
- "Konsensya" on YouTube

"Konsensya" (lit. 'Conscience') is a single by Filipino band IV of Spades. A follow-up to the group's previous single, "Nanaman", it was surprise-released on September 10, 2025, through Sony Music Philippines. It was written by Zild Benitez and composed it with the band. Produced by IV of Spades and Brian Lotho, the alternative rock track that conveys a deeply sorrowful narrative of longing. The music video depicts the band performing their song at a house party.

== Background and release ==
After the release of the band's previous singles, "Aura" and "Nanaman", the band surprise-released their third single, titled "Konsensya" (lit. 'Conscience'), and will be part of their upcoming album, titled Andalucia.

The cover artwork displays the band performing, captured from a still in the song's official music video. Light streaks on the left side of the image create a vintage aesthetic, reminiscent of 35mm film photography.

== Composition ==
The track is three minutes and thirty-three seconds long and was composed by the band and its lyrics was written by Zild Benitez. It was produced by IV of Spades and Brian Lotho, with Emil Dela Rosa providing as the mastering engineer and mixing engineer, while the latter, Brian Lotho and Daniel Monong providing as the recording engineer. It is an alternative rock track that conveys a deeply sorrowful narrative of longing.

Gabriel Saulog of Billboard Philippines highlighted that Zild's lyricism crafts an almost-haunting hold on you as the song goes by, it reaches its cathartic point as the gorgeous electric riff plays throughout the song’s outro, becoming inescapable in one’s mind.

== Credits and personnel ==
Credits are adapted from Apple Music.

- IV of Spades – vocals, composer, producer
- Zild Benitez – composer, lyrics
- Brian Lotho – producer, recording engineer
- Emil Dela Rosa – mastering engineer, mixing engineer, recording engineer
- Daniel Monong – recording engineer

== Commercial performance ==
Following its release two weeks later, it debuted at number 87 on the Billboard Philippines Hot 100.

== Charts ==
Chart performance for "Konsensya"
Chart (2025)	Peak position
Philippines (Philippines Hot 100)	87
