= Nanaman =

Single by IV of Spades

from the album Andalucia
- Language: Filipino
- Released: August 13, 2025
- Length: 3:13
- Label: Sony Philippines
- Composer: IV of Spades
- Lyricist: Blaster Silonga
- Producers: Brian Lotho; IV of Spades

IV of Spades singles chronology
"Aura" (2025)	"Nanaman" (2025)	"Konsensya" (2025)

Music video
- "Nanaman" on YouTube

"Nanaman" (lit. 'Again') is a single by Filipino band IV of Spades. A follow-up to the group's previous single, "Aura", it was surprise-released on August 13, 2025, through Sony Music Philippines. Band member Blaster Silonga wrote the track and composed it alongside the band. Produced by IV of Spades and Brian Lotho, "Nanaman" portrays the internal struggle of falling in love, particularly the potential loss of one's sanity during the process. The music video features Badjao de Castro riding a bike and Blaster Silonga as the lead vocalist.

== Background and release ==
After the success of the band's previous single, "Aura", which was released on July 16, 2025, peaking at number four in the Billboard Philippines Hot 100 and number three on the Top Philippine Songs charts, the band surprised-release their new single, titled "Nanaman" (lit. 'Again') on August 13, 2025.

The single's cover artwork, unlike "Aura", features a simple photograph of a lone bicycle, sparking online reactions and referencing drummer Badjao's lost bicycle, highlighting the band's lore and inside joke.

== Composition ==
The track is three minutes and thirteen seconds long and was composed by the band and its lyrics was written by Blaster Silonga. It was produced by IV of Spades and Brian Lotho, with Emil Dela Rosa providing as the mastering engineer, while the latter and Daniel Monong providing as the recording engineer. "Nanaman" portrays the internal struggle of falling in love, particularly the potential loss of one's sanity during the process. The song's narrative evokes emotions, reflecting the excitement of the process, but also adding a polished sheen, particularly in the instrumental bridge towards the track's completion, reflecting the track's erratic excitement. "Nanaman" also showcased Silonga as the lead vocals from the band's 2019 debut album, ClapClapClap!, which serves as a deadringer for tracks from Unique's solo work, with chugging chorus effect backed rhythm guitars.

== Music video ==
Directed by Kris Cazin, the music video features drummer Badjao rides a bicycle, referencing a fan joke about his "lost" bike. The music video was inspired by The Beatles' 1964 promotional film of "I Feel Fine", featuring Ringo Starr riding a stationary bike alongside the rest of the band. The local rock outfit heavily influences indie rock with their track, incorporating sonic elements from The Strokes' 2001 debut album, Is This It. Unique also donned a Rickenbacker guitar, popularized by George Harrison.

== Reception ==
Elijah Pareño of Rolling Stone Philippines highlighted that the song features Blaster Silonga as the lead vocalist. He mentioned that Silonga has previously sung vocal duties for the band, including "Come Inside of My Heart" from their debut album, ClapClapClap!. He also wrote that the music video pays tribute to The Beatles' 1964 single "I Feel Fine" performance video.

== Credits and personnel ==
Credits are adapted from Apple Music.

- IV of Spades – vocals, composer, producer
- Blaster Silonga – lyrics, lead guitar
- Unique Salonga – rhythm guitar
- Zild Benitez – bass guitar
- Badjao De Castro – drums
- Brian Lotho – producer
- Emil Dela Rosa – mastering engineer, recording engineer
- Daniel Monong – recording engineer
