= Bita and the Botflies =

Filipino rock band

- Also known as: Adobo Toothpaste
- Origin: Quezon City, Philippines
- Genres: Indie rock; blues rock; alternative rock
- Years active: 2016–present
- Label: O/C Records
- Members: Sofy Aldeguer; Kevin Navea; Rheymon Concepcion; Mark Lincallo
- Past members: Rebel Aldeguer

Bita and the Botflies is a Filipino indie rock band from Quezon City. The band was formed in 2016 and is composed of Sofy Aldeguer on vocals, Kevin Navea on guitars, Rheymon Concepcion on bass, and Mark Lincallo on drums. The band has developed a cult following due to the themes of their music.

== History ==
Bita and the Botflies was formed in 2016 under the original name "Adobo Toothpaste". They later changed their name to "The Botflies", inspired by the parasitic insects that grow inside human flesh. The name "Bita", taken from Sofy Aldeguer's childhood nickname, was added to make the band's name more memorable. The band initially consisted of Sofy and her father Rebel Aldeguer with Kevin Novenario-Navea, and Mark Lincallo.

In October 2017, the group released its debut single "Tagu-Taguan" (transl. Hide and Seek) through Monster RX IndieGround, where it peaked at number five on the station's chart. The band followed this with their debut extended play (EP) Sisikat Ka Iha in 2018.

In 2019, Bita and the Botflies released their first full-length album Peklat Cream, (Note: The word "Peklat" means scar.) along with the single "Manghuhula" (transl. Fortune Teller). The album further established the band’s reputation for unsettling narratives and social commentary.

The band returned in 2021 with the single "Guillotine Drops", inspired by horror and thriller films and series such as Alias Grace and The VVitch. The music video for the song includes witchcraft imagery, with Aldeguer appearing as a disembodied head.

== Artistry ==
Bita and the Botflies describe their sound as groovy, trippy, and kinda creepy, combining blues-rock foundations with pop-leaning melodies. Many of their songs tackle serious and troubling subjects, such as the objectification of women and domestic violence. Rolling Stone Philippines observed that tracks like "Peklat Cream" and "Sisikat Ka Iha" (transl. You Will Become Famous, Girl) feature morbid themes, which the band says reflect particular aspects of Filipino psyche.

Vocalist Sofy focuses on conveying personal and often painful truths, which she says are not yet fully accepted by society, making the band's music stand out. The band draws inspiration from local acts such as Up Dharma Down and IV of Spades. Sofy has cited Amy Winehouse, Lorde, Laura Marling, and Alabama Shakes as her personal influences.

== Members ==
=== Current members ===
- Sofy Aldeguer – vocals
- Kevin Novenario-Navea – guitar
- Rheymon Concepcion – bass
- Mark Lincallo – drums

=== Former members ===
- Rebel Aldeguer – guitar

== Discography ==
=== Studio albums ===
- Peklat Cream (2019)

=== EPs ===
- Sisikat Ka Iha (2018)

=== Singles ===
- "Tagu-Taguan" (2017)
- "Sisikat Ka Iha" (2017)
- "Chop-Chop Blues" (2019)
- "Manghuhula" (2019)
- "Guillotine Drops" (2021)
- "Quiapo" (2025)
- "Winston (1984)" (2026)
