= Grandma (album) =

Studio album by Unique
- Released: August 13, 2018
- Recorded: 2018
- Studios: House of Billy Gaga Studios, Quezon City
- Genres: Indie rock; alternative
- Length: 43:37
- Label: O/C
- Producers: Kean Cipriano (exec.); Unique (co.)

Unique chronology
Grandma (2018)	Pangalan (2020)

Singles from Grandma
- 1. "Midnight Sky" Released: July 12, 2018; 2. "Cha-Ching!" Released: September 1, 2018; 3. "Sino" Released: March 16, 2019

Grandma is the debut studio album by Filipino singer-songwriter Unique Salonga. It was released on August 13, 2018, by O/C Records.

== Background and composition ==
On May 5, 2018, IV of Spades frontman Unique Salonga officially departed from his band, seeking to pursue "personal endeavors", much to the dismay of fans. On July 13, Unique released his first single from the album, "Midnight Sky", accompanied by a black-and-white music video. This coincided with the release of IV of Spades's new single "In My Prison", the band's first after Unique's departure.

On September 1, Unique released the second single from the album, titled "Cha-Ching!" with its black-and-white music video, directed by himself. "Sino", the third single from the album, was released on March 16, 2019. Directed by Kean Cipriano, its music video was also set in black-and-white mode and shot in various places to have a “symmetrical” vibe to achieve a self-exploration feel, according to him.

"OZONE (Itulak Ang Pinto)" features its mood as funky and upbeat. Despite the energetic beat, the song creates an eerie feeling as it refers to the 1996 Ozone Disco fire officially acknowledged as the worst fire in Philippine history.

== Recording ==
With Callalily vocalist Kean Cipriano co-producing, Unique self-produced Grandma. Emil Dela Rosa mixed and mastered the album with Billy Reyes at the House of Billy Gaga Studios. "Cha-Ching!" was one of the first songs to be recorded and utilized heavy synths, percussion tracks, and vocal stacks. Among the first tracks as well was "Midnight Sky" which used a Shure SM57 and an AKG C414 XLS for mics. The song is one of the more minimalist in the album, alongside "Apoy ng Kandila". The tracks "Jules" and "Goodnight Prayer" were mixed to mimic the panning effects of records during the early days of stereo. "OZONE (Itulak Ang Pinto)" features its mood as funky and upbeat. Despite the energetic beat, the song creates an eerie feeling as it refers to the 1996 Ozone Disco fire officially acknowledged as the worst fire in Philippine history.

== Track listing ==
All tracks are written by Unique.

Grandma track listing
No.	Title	Length
1.	"M"	0:34
2.	"Cha-Ching!"	2:40
3.	"OZONE (Itulak Ang Pinto)"	3:34
4.	"Jules"	4:22
5.	"I'll Break Your Little Heart"	4:25
6.	"Sino"	4:40
7.	"Paalala:"	1:05
8.	"Goodnight Prayer"	5:19
9.	"Midnight Sky"	4:04
10.	"Apoy Ng Kandila"	4:25
11.	"We Know"	6:14
12.	"My Old Friend"	2:07
Total length:		43:37

== Accolades ==
Year	Award	Category	Notable Works	Result	Ref.
2019	32nd Awit Award	Best Cover Art	"Grandma"	Won	
2021	6th Wish Music Awards	Wishclusive Rock/Alternative Song of the Year	"Sino"	Won	
