= Sandali (Mrld song) =

- Official single cover

Single by Mrld

from the album 7th Sense
- Language: Tagalog
- English title: Wait
- Released: June 21, 2024
- Genre: Hip-hop; R&B; pop
- Length: 3:31
- Label: O/C Records

Mrld singles chronology
"Lihim" (2024)	"Sandali" (2024)	"M.I.N.O.Y." (2024)

"Sandali" (lit. 'Wait') is a song recorded by the Filipino singer Mrld. It was released under O/C Records on June 21, 2024. It is a hip-hop, R&B, and pop song from the perspective of someone asking their partner to stay, while also keeping their relationship private. Mrld leaked a snippet of the song in November 2023. At the time, it received negative responses due to its sound diverging from the singer's usual folksy style. However, it began to trend on TikTok by March 2024. The song peaked at number 18 on Billboard's Top Philippine Songs chart and number 29 on the Philippines Hot 100.

== Background and release ==
In November 2023, Filipino singer Mrld leaked a snippet of her then-unreleased and unfinished song "Sandali" (lit. 'Wait') online. The track began to trend on TikTok in March 2024. On May 23, she announced the official release date for "Sandali" via X. As of June 2024, more than 200,000 videos on TikTok used the snippet under the name "mrld unreleased song [sic]". "Sandali" was released as a single on June 21, 2024, along with an official lyric visualizer. On March 7, 2025, the song was re-released as a track on 7th Sense, Mrld's debut album.

== Composition and lyrics ==
"Sandali" has been described as a hip-hop, R&B, and pop song. Billboard Philippines' Kara Angan noted that the song's instrumentals sound markedly different from the folksy style with which Mrld is widely associated. According to Mrld, she received considerable criticism for the shift in genre when she first leaked the song in November 2023. The lyrics are from the perspective of someone asking another person to stay while keeping their romantic relationship "lowkey" or private.

== Commercial performance ==
"Sandali" debuted on Billboard Philippines' Hot 100 chart at number 50. In the week of July 13, 2024, "Sandali" was reportedly the biggest gainer on the magazine's charts, entering the Top Philippine Songs list at number 18 and peaking at number 29 on the Hot 100.

== Charts ==
Chart performances for "Sandali"
Chart (2024)	Peak position
Philippines (Philippines Hot 100)	29
Philippines (Top Philippine Songs)	18

== Personnel ==
Credits are adapted from Tidal.

- Mrld - vocals, composition, lyrics
- Jefferson Macasarte - production, arrangement
