= Tropical Dream =

Studio album by IV of Spades
- Released: December 9, 2026
- Languages: Filipino, English
- Label: Sony
- Producers: Brian Lotho; IV of Spades

IV of Spades chronology
| Andalucia (2025) | Tropical Dream (2026) |

Singles from Tropical Dream
- 1. "Isang Pag-Ibig" Released: September 9, 2026; 2. "Rollercoaster" Released: October 7, 2026; 3. "Susundan" Released: November 11, 2026

Tropical Dream (stylized in all caps) is the upcoming third album by the Filipino rock band IV of Spades. Set to be released on December 9, 2026, the album contains 14 tracks. Three tracks from the album, such as "Isang Pag-Ibig", "Rollercoaster", and "Susundan") have been released as singles.

== Background ==
After the release of their second album, Andalucia, IV of Spades embarked on their Andalucia Tour and their US & Canada Tour, during which they released Isang Pag-Ibig, a single written in 2016, followed by Rollercoaster. It was also during this time that the band bagged trophies in the Awit Awards and Filipino Music Awards.

Tropical Dream was subsequently announced on November 11, 2026, the day the IV of Spades released Susundan, which ended up being the third single off the album.

== Track listing ==
All music is composed by the IV of Spades.

Released tracks
| No. | Title | Writer(s) | Length |
|---|---|---|---|
| 3. | "Rollercoaster" | Unique Salonga; Christian Gabriel de Castro; Blaster Silonga; Daniel Zildjian Benitez | 4:33 |
| 6. | "Susundan" | Blaster Silonga | 2:51 |
| 10. | "Isang Pag-Ibig" | Unique Salonga; Daniel Zildjian Benitez | 4:39 |
