= Mrld =

Filipina singer (born 2005)

mrld
- Born: Meriel de Jesus; February 17, 2005 (age 21)
- Origin: Bogo, Cebu, Philippines
- Genres: Original Pilipino Music
- Occupations: Singer; songwriter
- Years active: 2019–present
- Labels: O/C; Viva

Meriel de Jesus, who goes by the mononym Mrld (also stylized all caps, pronounced as individual letters), is a Filipino singer and songwriter. She signed a record deal with Kean Cipriano's label O/C Records / Viva Records, and released her debut track "An Art Gallery Could Never Be Unique As You" under that label in 2021. She gained mainstream popularity with "Art Gallery" as well as the song "Ligaya". In May 2022, she was featured on a billboard ad for Spotify on Women at Times Square.

== Early life ==
Meriel de Jesus was born on February 17, 2005 in Bogo, Cebu, Philippines. She studied Junior High School at City of Bogo Science and Arts Academy (2017- 2019).

== Career ==
In February 2024, Mrld released her single, titled "Lihim" (lit. 'Secret'), after sharing the concept photos. On June, Mrld released her first R&B hip-hop track, titled "Sandali" (lit. 'Wait').

In March 2025, Mrld released her debut album, titled "7th Sense". It includes her previous singles, like "M.I.N.O.Y.", "Sandali", and "Lihim". On April, she had a concert with the same name as her debut album in SM North EDSA, with Healy After Dark and P-pop girl group G22 as the opening acts.

== Artistry ==
Although she has not written any songs in Cebuano, she credited Vispop for being her "gateway" to music in an interview with Billboard Philippines Kara Angan. Angan also credited the genre for molding Mrld's lyricism.

== Discography ==
=== Studio albums ===
List of studio albums, with release date, label, and format shown
Title	Details	Ref.
7th Sense	Released: March 7, 2025; Label: O/C Records; Format: digital download, streaming	

=== Singles ===
Singles
Year	Title	Album	Ref.
2019	"Your Eyes, They Lie"		Non-album singles
2019 (Note: "An Art Gallery" was re-released on March 19, 2021 by O/C Records)	"An Art Gallery Could Never Be Unique as You"		Non-album singles
2020	"My Summer's Cold Without You"		Non-album singles
2020	"What Are We"		Non-album singles
2020	"Hinto Galaw"		Non-album singles
2020	"Kapit Bitiw"		Non-album singles
2021	"Ligaya"		Non-album singles
2022	"Maligayang Pagkunwari"		Non-album singles
2022	"Ikaw Pa Rin"		
2023	"sa'yong sa'yo lang ako"		Non-album single
2024	"Lihim"		
2024	"Sandali"		
2024	"M.I.N.O.Y."		

== Filmography ==
=== Music videos ===
Title	Director(s)	Ref.
"Maligayang Pagkunwari"	Kris Cazin	
"Ikaw pa rin"	Kris Cazin	
