= Homework Machine =

Studio album by Zild
- Released: August 6, 2020
- Recorded: 2020
- Genre: electropop
- Length: 36:47
- Label: Warner Music Philippines
- Producer: Zild Benitez

Zild chronology
Homework Machine (2020)	Huminga (2021)

Singles from Homework Machine
- 1. "Sinungaling" Released: June 12, 2020; 2. "Dila" Released: July 9, 2020; 3. "Habulan" Released: August 6, 2020; 4. "Alalahanin" Released: September 12, 2020; 5. "Takbo Ng Panahon" Released: October 3, 2020

Homework Machine is the solo debut album by the Filipino singer-songwriter and IV of Spades member Zild. It was released on August 6, 2020, under Warner Music Philippines.

== Background ==
On June 12, 2020, Benitez released "Sinungaling" with its music video on YouTube. Few weeks later, he also released "Dila", along with its music video on July 9, 2020.

On August 1, 2020, he posted a picture of the track listing of his solo debut album on Twitter, also announcing the release date of the album on August 6.

With the release of the album, he also released the music video for "Habulan", making it the third single from the album. On September 12, 2020, he released the animated music video of "Alalahanin". He also released the music video for "Takbo Ng Panahon" on October 3, 2020.

== Track listing ==
All tracks are written by Zild Benitez.

Homework Machine track listing
No.	Title	Length
1.	"Sinungaling"	3:44
2.	"Bakit"	4:12
3.	"Dila"	3:41
4.	"Mapagpanggap"	2:58
5.	"Habulan"	3:28
6.	"Alalahanin"	3:46
7.	"Iiwanan Ng Lahat"	2:54
8.	"Hawla"	3:39
9.	"Takbo Ng Panahon"	3:51
10.	"Agaw-dilim"	4:31
Total length:		36:47

== Accolades ==
Year	Award	Category	Notable Works	Result	Ref.
2021	6th Wish Music Awards	Wish Rock/Alternative Song of the Year	"Sinungaling"	Nominated	
2021	16th MYX Music Awards	Rock Video of the Year	"Dila"	Nominated	
