= Aura (IV of Spades song) =

Single by IV of Spades

from the album Andalucia
- Language: Filipino
- Released: July 16, 2025
- Genre: Indie pop; psychedelic pop
- Length: 5:18
- Label: Sony Philippines
- Composers: Blaster Silonga; Daniel Zildjian Benitez; Gabriel de Castro; Unique Salonga
- Lyricist: Daniel Zildjian Benitez: Unique Salonga
- Producers: Brian Lotho; IV of Spades

IV of Spades singles chronology
"Sariling Multo (Sa Panaginip)" (2020)	"Aura" (2025)	"Nanaman" (2025)

Music video
- "Aura" on YouTube

"Aura" is a single by Filipino band IV of Spades and their seventh track from their second studio album, Andalucia. It was surprise-released on July 16, 2025, through Sony Music Philippines. It is the band's first release in five years, following their 2020 single "Sariling Multo (Sa Panaginip)" (transl. Own Ghost (In Dreams)), and their return from an indefinite hiatus. Band members Zild Benitez and Unique Salonga wrote the track and composed it with the rest of the band. Produced by IV of Spades and Brian Lotho, "Aura" is a slow-paced indie pop song about unconditional love, longing, and seeking meaning and home within communities.

The release of "Aura" as well as the band's reunion received mass reactions, including from Original Pilipino Music (OPM) artists and fans, as well as certain individuals. It entered on record charts of Billboard Philippines following its release, debuting at number 28 and peaked at number four on the Philippines Hot 100. It also debuted at number 14 and peaked at number three on the Top Philippine Songs chart.

== Background and release ==
In 2018, Unique Salonga left the band to pursue a solo career, and the group went on indefinite hiatus in 2020.

In 2025, their song "Mundo" (lit. 'World'), in which Unique's last song before he left the band, charted on the Philippines Hot 100, peaking at number 96. On July 16, the band officially returned with the new surprise-released single titled "Aura" under Sony Music Philippines, marking their first release in five years, and also with their new management, Balcony Music Entertainment. The song also marked Salonga's return as the band's lead vocalist and rhythm guitarist.

== Composition ==
"Aura" is a slow-paced indie pop song with a length of five minutes. Band members Zild Benitez and Salonga wrote "Aura" and composed it with the other members, Blaster Silonga and Gabriel de Castro. The band produced the track with Brian Lotho, who has credits on a number of their songs. Lotho is also the recording engineer alongside Daniel Monong and Emil Dela Rosa, who is the mastering engineer. The track has indie pop instrumentation that Mayks Go of Billboard Philippines described as "laidback". It is driven by synthesizers with textures from folk and electronica music, and includes clear acoustic and electric guitar tones, and drums. Silonga, Salonga, and Benitez sing with harmonies, and the latter two do call and response vocals with one another. Lyrically, "Aura" is about unconditional love, longing, and trying to find meaning and home within communities.

== Reception ==
The release of "Aura" as well as the group's reunion was met with mass reactions. Philippine publications reported that fans of Original Pilipino Music (OPM) expressed delight, disbelief, and excitement regarding the reunion on social media. (Note: As reported by ABS-CBN News' Push Team, Billboard Philippines, and GMA Network's news divisions.) A multitude of OPM artists and bands posted their reaction of the reunion or reposted the group's announcement of the song. One such artist was Toneejay, whose post on Facebook about his reaction went viral for the reflection of his experiences with their music. Roslyn Pineda, the General Manager of Sony Music Philippines, said in a press statement that the song's release was an "unprecedented moment in Filipino music" and that she felt "surreal" that the band reunited. The founder and original manager of the group, Allan "Daddy A" Silonga, was exceedingly proud of their reunion based on his post about it on Facebook.

The song received instantaneous commercial reception upon release. According to Billboard Philippines, "Aura" was an immediate success on streaming services and social media platforms. The track debuted on the magazine's record charts with two days of chart-tracking data, entering at number 28 on the Philippines Hot 100 and number 14 on the Top Philippine Songs. The track peaked at number four on the Philippines Hot 100 and number three on the Top Philippine Songs

== Critical response ==
Carl Martin Agustin of Philippine Daily Inquirer believed that it was a new one for the band and that it was emblematic of the "individual paths they took as independent artists." In Rolling Stone Philippines, Elijah Pareño said that the song could be a sign of the group straying away from their previous formulas and focusing on building on the sounds of their solo works. Pareño also described the vocals of Salonga and Benitez as having "a calm but precise energy, leaning less into flash and more into restraint." Jv Ordoñez of Esquire Philippines regarded it as "a more lush and understated" track for the band and a deviation from their sonic influences. He additionally said that the vocals and songwriting conjures "a steady emotional reflection of a yearning and dealing with emotional turmoil".

== Music video ==
Directed and edited by Raliug, and produced by LunchBox Productions, the music video was released together with the song on July 16, 2025. The music video features the band enjoying each other's company on a grassy hilltop, watching sights and running. Within 24 hours of its music video release, it garnered 1.1 million views and was trending at number two on YouTube.

== Accolades ==
Award	Year	Category	Result	Ref.
Filipino Music Awards	2025	Rock Song of the Year	Won	
Filipino Music Awards	2025	People’s Choice Awards — Song	Nominated	
Filipino Music Awards	2025	Song of the Year	Nominated	

== Credits and personnel ==
Credits are adapted from Apple Music.

- IV of Spades — vocals, producer
- Unique Salonga — composer, lyrics
- Zild Benitez — composer, lyrics
- Blaster Silonga — composer
- Gabriel de Castro — composer
- Brian Lotho — producer, recording engineer
- Emil Dela Rosa — mastering engineer, recording engineer
- Daniel Monong — recording engineer

== Charts ==
Chart performance for "Aura"
Chart (2025)	Peak position
Philippines (IFPI)	4
Philippines (Philippines Hot 100)	4
Philippines (Top Philippine Songs)	3

== Listicles ==
Name of publisher, year listed, name of listicle, and placement
Publisher	Year	Listicle	Placement	Ref.
Billboard Philippines	2025	25 Best Filipino Songs of 2025	Placed	
