= Pangalan =

Studio album by Unique
- Released: March 27, 2020
- Recorded: 2019–2020
- Studio: House of Billy Gaga Studios, Quezon City
- Genre: Indie rock; alternative
- Length: 34:24
- Label: O/C Records
- Producer: Unique

Unique chronology
Grandma (2018)	Pangalan (2020)	Daisy (2023)

Singles from Pangalan
- 1. "Lamang Lupa" Released: July 6, 2019; 2. "Bukod-Tangi" Released: August 16, 2019; 3. "Huwag Ka Sanang Magagalit" Released: November 20, 2020; 4. "Mga Katulad Mo" Released: September 25, 2021

Pangalan (stylized as PANGALAN:) (lit. 'Name') is the second studio album by Filipino singer-songwriter Unique Salonga. It was released on March 27, 2020, by O/C Records following his debut studio album Grandma in 2018.

== Background ==
On April 22, 2019, he posted a plain green picture on his Facebook page along with the caption 'SECOND ALBUM', making his fans wonder about his announcement for that album.

On July 6, 2019, he released his first single on the album, "Lamang Lupa," and its vertical music video was later released on July 20, 2019.

The second single from the album, "Bukod-Tangi," was released on August 16, 2019, the day after the first anniversary of his debut album. Its 360° music video was released on YouTube on February 7, 2020.

On November 20, 2020, O/C Records released the music video for "Huwag Ka Sanang Magagalit".

== Production ==
The production and recording of the album started on 2019. The album consists of 8 tracks. Unique was credited as the primary writer, producer, arranger of the album, and the instrumentation of the whole album was made by Salonga himself on vocals, guitar, and synth, Divino Dayacap on piano and percussions, Ghabby Gee on drums, and Emil Dela Rosa on bass, who also mixed and mastered the tracks of the album. "Bukod-Tangi" and "Lamang Lupa," which were the singles from Pangalan, were the first songs to be recorded for the album itself, while "Pahinga" was the last track to be recorded for the album.

== Track listing ==
All tracks are written by Unique.

Pangalan track listing
No.	Title	Length
1.	"Korporasyon"	3:38
2.	"Dambuhala"	3:49
3.	"Bukod-Tangi"	3:50
4.	"Lamang Lupa"	4:06
5.	"Delubyo"	5:05
6.	"Mga Katulad Mo"	4:12
7.	"Pahinga"	4:50
8.	"Huwag Ka Sanang Magagalit"	4:54
Total length:		34:24

== Accolades ==
Accolades for Pangalan
Year	Award	Category	Notable Works	Result	Ref.
2020	5th Wish Music Awards	Wish Rock/Alternative Song of the Year	"Bukod-Tangi"	Nominated	
2021	6th Wish Music Awards	Wish Rock/Alternative Song of the Year	"Huwag Ka Sanang Magagalit"	Nominated	
