= Huminga =

Studio album by Zild
- Released: April 8, 2021
- Length: 39:58
- Languages: English; Tagalog
- Labels: Balcony; Warner
- Producers: Daniel Zildjian Benitez; Tim Marquez

Zild chronology
Homework Machine (2020)	Huminga (2021)	Medisina (2022)

Singles from Huminga
- 1. "Kyusi" Released: February 10, 2021; 2. "Apat" Released: February 25, 2021; 3. "Bungantulog" Released: March 18, 2021; 4. "Huminga" Released: May 2, 2021; 5. "Hele" Released: September 14, 2021

Huminga (lit. 'Breathe') is the second solo studio album by the Filipino singer-songwriter and IV of Spades member Zild. It was released on April 8, 2021, through Balcony Entertainment, distributed by Warner Music Philippines. It was consisting of ten tracks. The album draws on personal themes such as first love, friendship, and isolation. It features a more grounded sound with acoustic, twelve-string guitars, hofner bass, traditional drumming and slide guitar. Its rapid release following his debut invited comparisons to Taylor Swift's Folklore and Evermore.

== Background and release ==
On March 12, 2021, Zild announced his second solo album, Huminga, scheduled for release on April 8, 2021. The album's cover art, featuring a nighttime photograph of the artist in a natural setting, was taken by Shaira Luna. He also released the first physical CD release. It was issued by Balcony Entertainment in partnership with the independent record shop The Grey Market Records, the limited edition included a 26-page booklet featuring photographs by Luna, design by Daniel Aguilar, and illustrations by Sean Eloid Dominguez.

== Composition ==
Huminga consists of ten tracks released by Balcony Entertainment, distributed by Warner Music Philippines. The album has been described the album as a more personal work and "a document of a growing songwriter." Released less than six months after his debut, the album comparisons to the rapid release of Taylor Swift's Folklore and Evermore. The record features a more grounded sound, incorporating acoustic and twelve-string guitar, hofner bass, traditional drumming, and slide guitar. In an interview with NME, Zild stated that Huminga drew on personal experiences he had not previously explored in his songwriting, including the themes of first love, friendship, and isolation. He also cited musical influences from earlier generations, such as John Lennon's "Imagine"; Cynthia Alexander's "Insomia" which featured guitarist Noel Mendez, later recruited for the studio album; and Neil Young's "Heart of Gold".

== Track listing ==
Huminga track listing
No.	Title	Writer(s)	Producer(s)	Length
1.	"Huminga"	Daniel Zildjian Benitez		5:10
2.	"Apat"	Benitez	Benitez; Tim Marquez	4:10
3.	"Bungantulog"	Benitez	Benitez	3:52
4.	"Paalam Mahal"	Benitez	Benitez	3:57
5.	"Kyusi"	Benitez	Benitez	4:31
6.	"Hari"	Benitez	Benitez	3:34
7.	"A Love Song"	Benitez	Benitez	2:32
8.	"Glyndel"	Benitez	Benitez	3:07
9.	"Wala Nang Kumakatok"	Benitez	Benitez	5:53
10.	"Hele"	Benitez	Benitez	3:12
Total length:				39:58

== Personnel ==
Credits are adapted by Tidal.

- Zild (Note: Credited by his real name Daniel Zildjian Benitez.) – vocal (all tracks), composer (all tracks), lyricist (all tracks)
