= O/C Records =

Philippine record label

- Parent company: Viva Records
- Founded: August 14, 2018; 8 years ago
- Founder: Kean Cipriano; Chynna Ortaleza
- Status: Active
- Distributor: Viva Entertainment
- Genre: Various
- Country of origin: Philippines
- Location: Unit 101, Catalina Building, 15 12th St, New Manila, Quezon City, 1112 Metro Manila, Philippines

O/C Records is an independent record label in the Philippines founded on August 14, 2018 by former vocalist of Callalily (changing as Lily after his departure) Kean Cipriano and his wife Chynna Ortaleza as part of Viva Entertainment.

== History ==
Kean Cipriano, former frontman and lead vocalist of the alternative rock band Callalily, ventured into artist management with the indie alternative rock band IV of Spades. The band, known for their musicality, fashion, and artistic style, saw a rapid rise to fame, especially after the release of their hit song "Mundo". However, three months later, the band's lead vocalist, Unique Salonga, announced his departure to pursue a solo career.

Cipriano explained that after releasing "Mundo", he felt his role as their manager was complete and decided to leave. He expressed gratitude for the opportunity but cited the toxicity of the music industry as a reason for starting his own label.

Partnering with Vic del Rosario of Viva Records, Cipriano and his wife, Chynna Ortaleza, founded O/C Records. The name stands for Ortaleza and Cipriano, reflecting their joint efforts.

== Notable artists ==
- 12th Street (Pinoy Rock)
- Adie Garcia
- Alyssa
- Ángelito
- Arthur Nery (Viva)
- Bita and the Botflies
- bird.
- Callalily (until 2021)
- Calein
- Cean Jr.
- Drive of Daydreams
- Earl Generao
- Ell
- Frizzle Anne
- Gian Magdangal
- Glaiza De Castro
- Halina
- Healy After Dark
- Jade Ivy
- Jay Kent
- Jem Cubil
- Johnoy Danao
- Kean Cipriano
- Kenaniah
- King Ina ño
- Lochnezz
- Lolomo O Pao
- Martin Riggs
- Max Importunate
- Mimiyuuuh
- Mrld
- Pappel
- Patty Tiu
- Project Moonman
- Pooky Koma Lagkit
- Rhythm & Drip
- Rice Lucido
- Rockalyt
- Ryannah J
- Sabrina Manansalas
- Telay
- Totoy Mola
- The Wallblossoms
- Thursday Honey
- Una Unani
- Zsaris
