= ClapClapClap! =

Studio album by IV of Spades
- Released: January 18, 2019
- Recorded: 2018
- Genre: Indie rock
- Length: 54:46
- Label: Warner Music Philippines

IV of Spades chronology
ClapClapClap! (2019)	Andalucia (2025)

Singles from ClapClapClap!
- 1. "In My Prison" Released: July 12, 2018; 2. "Bata, Dahan-Dahan!" Released: October 28, 2018; 3. "Take That Man" Released: December 28, 2018; 4. "Bawat Kaluluwa" Released: January 20, 2019; 5. "Come Inside of My Heart" Released: October 13, 2019

ClapClapClap! (stylized in all caps) is the debut studio album by Filipino band IV of Spades. It was released on January 18, 2019 by Warner Music Philippines. The album features songs that were previously released as singles, namely "In My Prison", "Bata, Dahan-Dahan", "Take That Man", "Bawat Kaluluwa", and their fifth single "Come Inside of My Heart".

== Background and recording ==
IV of Spades is a funk-rock band from the Philippines. Formed in 2014, it consists of lead vocalist and bassist Zild Benitez, lead guitarist Blaster Silonga, and drummer Badjao de Castro. Unique Salonga, the band's original lead vocalist, left the band in April 2018 and pursued a solo career, after which Benitez took over singing duties. As the band announced Unique's departure and dispelled rumors of disbanding, they told fans on their Facebook page that they were working on their first full-length record.

Months prior to the album's release, the band issued several successful singles, including "Mundo", which still featured Unique as a vocalist.

According to an interview with Philippine magazine Chalk, the band members decided on recording the album as an overnight decision while recording "In My Prison". Recording and production commenced in August 2018 and lasted for four months.

== Music and lyrics ==
The album departs from the band's prior funk-rock style. CLAPCLAPCLAP! takes influence from various genres including alternative rock, electro pop, pop, indie pop, ballad, pop rock, and psychedelic rock. Three out of 15 of the album's tracks are written in Filipino, specifically "Bata, Dahan-Dahan!", "Bawat Kaluluwa", and "Dulo ng Hangganan". Its lyrical content explores themes of childhood, freedom, and relationships.

== Release ==
ClapClapClap! was released on January 18, 2019 on Spotify, Apple Music, and iTunes. Subsequently, on January 20, a music video for their fourth single "Bawat Kaluluwa" was uploaded on the band's official YouTube page.

== Track listing ==
No.	Title	Writer(s)	Length
1.	"ClapClapClap!"	Zild Benitez, Badjao De Castro, Blaster Silonga	0:15
2.	"Sweet Shadow"	Benitez	4:03
3.	"Bata, Dahan-Dahan!"	Benitez, De Castro, Silonga	4:06
4.	"Bawat Kaluluwa"	Benitez, Silonga	3:58
5.	"Not My Energy"	Benitez, Silonga	4:03
6.	"Come Inside of My Heart"	Silonga	4:06
7.	"The Novel of My Mind"	Benitez, De Castro, Silonga	1:20
8.	"Dulo ng Hangganan"	Benitez, Silonga	5:28
9.	"In My Prison"	Benitez, Silonga, Unique Salonga	3:38
10.	"My Juliana"	Benitez, Silonga	4:46
11.	"I'm a Butterfly"	Benitez, Silonga	4:49
12.	"I Ain't Perfect"	De Castro, Silonga	4:22
13.	"Take That Man"	Benitez, Salonga	3:59
14.	"Captivated"	Benitez, Silonga	3:39
15.	"I Would Rather Live Alone (I'm Not Who I'm Today)"	Benitez	2:14
Total length:			54:46

== Awards and nominations ==
Year	Award	Category	Result	Ref.
2020	Awit Awards 2020	Album of the Year	Won	
2020	Awit Awards 2020	Record of the Year (for Bawat Kaluluwa)	Won	
2020	MYX Music Awards 2020	Rock Video of the Year (for Come Inside of My Heart)	Won	

== See also ==
- IV of Spades discography
