= Blaster Silonga =

Filipino singer-songwriter, musician and producer (born 1999)

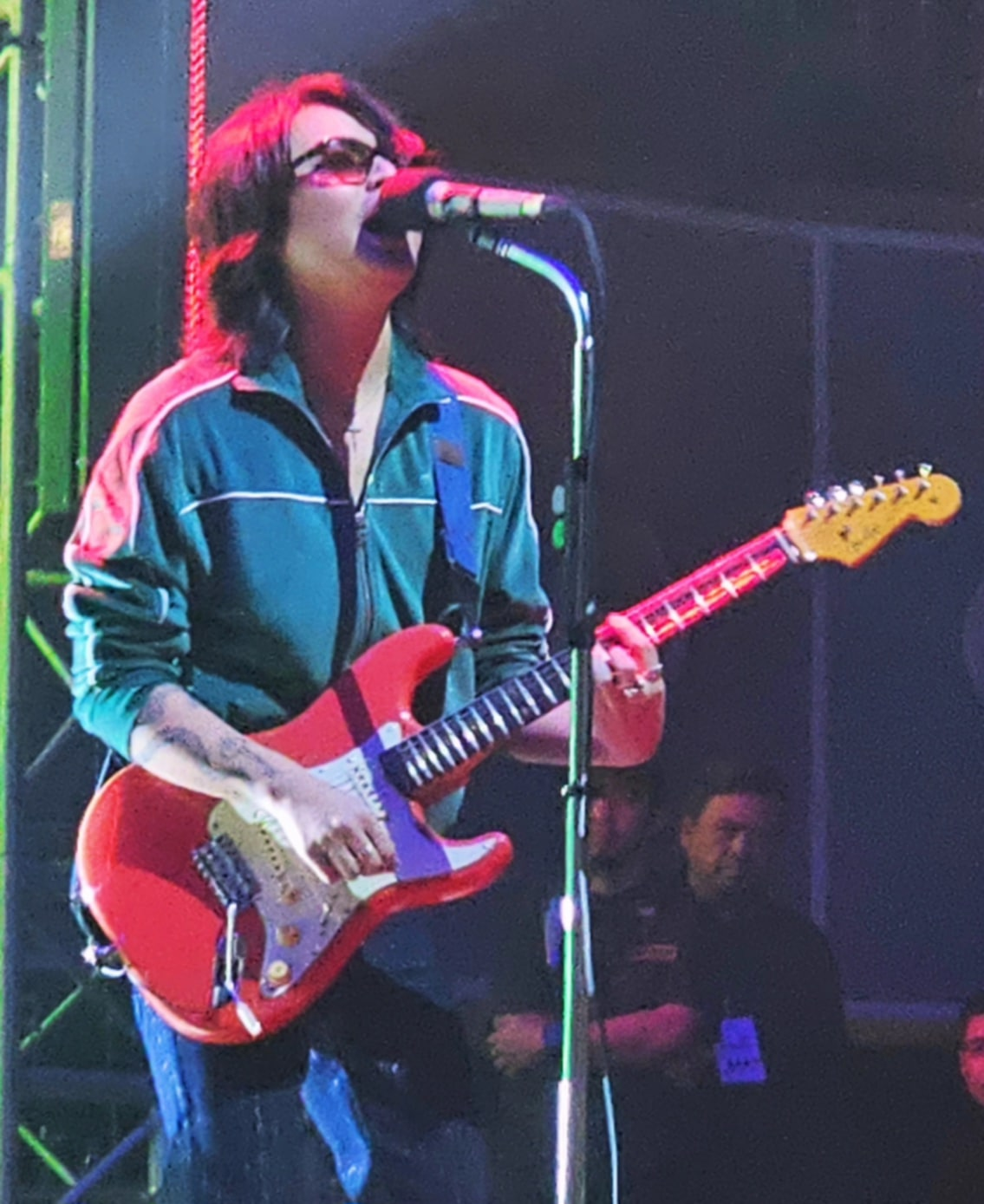
- Silonga in 2025

Background information
- Born: Blaster Mitchell Medina Silonga; September 30, 1999 (age 26); Marikina, Philippines
- Genres: Glam rock
- Occupations: Musician; singer-songwriter; producer
- Instruments: Vocals; guitar; drums
- Years active: 2014–present
- Labels: Island; UMG
- Member of: IV of Spades; Blaster and the Celestial Klowns

Blaster Mitchell Medina Silonga (born September 30, 1999) is a Filipino singer-songwriter, musician and producer. He is best known as the co-vocalist and lead guitarist of the funk rock band IV of Spades. He also pursued a solo career and formed his own band known as "Blaster and the Celestial Klowns" when the band went on an indefinite hiatus in 2020, which he released his first studio album My Kosmik Island Disk in 2022. He released his second and latest studio album Last Fool Show in 2025.

== Early life ==
Blaster was born in Sta. Monica, Tañong, Marikina. He is the son of veteran musician Allan Silonga, a member of 90s band Kindred Garden and the singing group Daddy's Home which finished third in The X Factor Philippines, and the current Senior A&R Manager at Def Jam Recordings Philippines label under UMG Philippines. He has three siblings, namely Dave, Ashanti, and Alleinah.

== Music career ==
=== IV of Spades ===
In June 2014, Allan Silonga decided to form a band for his son. The Silongas were able to recruit drummer Badjao de Castro and bassist Zildjian "Zild" Benitez, who are the sons of Allan's friends. Unique Salonga, Benitez's churchmate who was already writing his own music, was later recruited to become the band's lead singer.

The band has released multiple singles, including the hit single "Mundo", and their debut album ClapClapClap!.

=== Solo career ===
On 13 August 2016, Silonga joined a music competition named "Music Hero" in the noontime show Eat Bulaga!. He originally won the "Electric Guitar Hero" title, but due to IV of Spades' rise to fandom, he and his bandmate, Zild Benitez, who also won the "Bass Hero" title, left their titles and gave it up.

In 2021, Silonga officially signed with UMG Philippines label Island Records Philippines. He released his debut single, "Disko Forever", in both Japanese (released on 30 September 2021) and original Filipino version (released on 29 October 2021).

Coinciding with his solo career, he formed his own band The Celestial Klowns, consists of his brother Dave Silonga on bass, Crystal Jobli on keyboards, Max Cinco on drums, and songwriter-producer Dan Tanedo on guitars.

On October 8, 2022, Silonga released his debut studio album My Kosmik Island Disk, featuring 9 tracks including his newest singles "Nararararamdaman" and "O Kay Ganda".

== Discography ==
=== As a solo artist ===
==== Studio albums ====
List of studio albums with selected details
Title	Album Details
My Kosmik Island Disk	Released: October 8, 2022 (PH); Label: Island Records Philippines UMG Philippines; Format: Digital download, streaming, 12"
Last Fool Show	Released: May 23, 2025 (PH); Label: Island Records Philippines UMG Philippines; Format: Digital download, streaming

==== Singles ====
List of singles as lead artist, showing year released and album name
Title	Year	Peak chart positions	Album
Title	Year	PHL	Album
Disko Forever (Japanese Version)	2021	—	(Non-album single)
Disko Forever	2021	—	My Kosmik Island Disk
Pasko'y Hindi Na Masaya	2021	—	(Non-album single)
Nararararamdaman	2022	—	My Kosmik Island Disk
O Kay Ganda	2022	—	My Kosmik Island Disk
Sa Huli Ang Pagsisisi	2022	—	My Kosmik Island Disk
Kamukha	2024	—	Last Fool Show
Boomerang	2025	—	Last Fool Show
Hari Ng Kapalpakan	2025	—	Last Fool Show
Akala Ko	2025	—	Last Fool Show
"—" denotes releases that did not chart or were not released in that region.

=== As a featured artist ===
Year	Title	Ref(s)
2022	Maitim na Mahika (with John Roa and Yuridope)	
