= Surprise album =

Music album released with little or no prior publicity

A surprise album or surprise release is an album or single with little or no prior announcement, marketing, or promotion. The strategy contrasts traditional album releases, which typically feature weeks or months of advertising in the form of singles, music videos, tour announcements, and album pre-sales.

The concept of the surprise album originated in minimally publicized releases such as Radiohead's In Rainbows (2007) and became a widely adopted strategy after Beyoncé became the first artist to release an album with no prior announcement with her self-titled record (2013). The surprise-release strategy was borne out of a desire to combat music leaks and reinstate focus on the album format in an era dominated by singles and streaming, with artists subsequently emulating the approach as a marketing tactic. Analysts considered the surprise album to be an innovative strategy that transformed how music is released in the digital age. Over time, its rising dominance within the music industry led some journalists to highlight the increasing ambiguity of its definition and the variable effectiveness of artists' attempts at the move.

== History ==
=== 2001–2013: Precursors ===
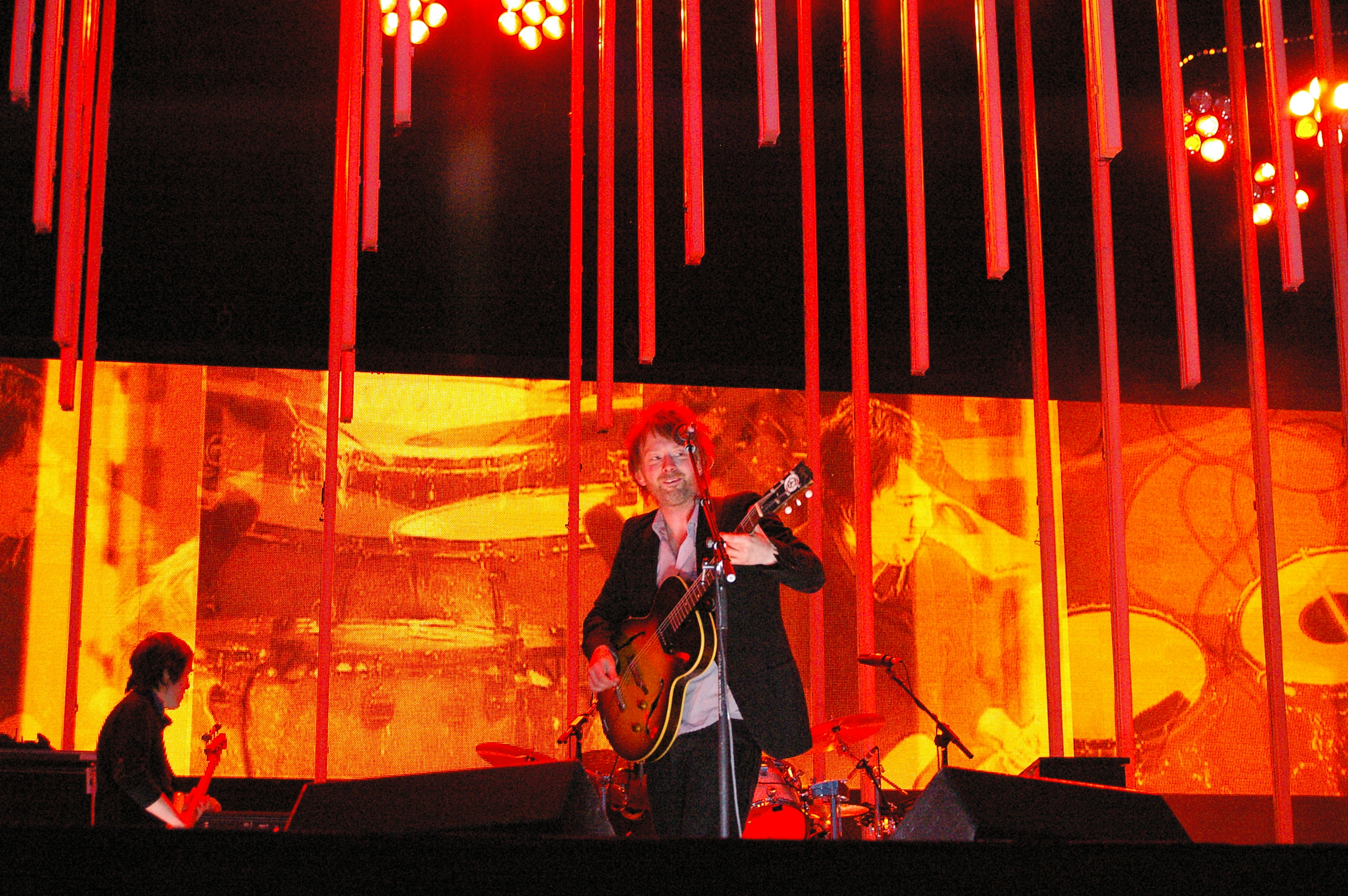
Radiohead on tour for their 2007 surprise album In Rainbows

In 2001, the English musician David Bowie intended to reimagine some of his earlier recordings with a live band as quickly as possible and release it as a surprise. This album, Toy, was delayed several times by Bowie's label Virgin EMI Records, and eventually saw an official release in 2021. A press release from Bowie's team upon release said: "Unfortunately, in 2001 the concept of the 'surprise drop' album release and the technology to support it were still quite a few years off, making it impossible to release Toy, as the album was now named, out to fans as instantly as David wanted."

The English rock band Radiohead announced their 2007 studio album In Rainbows ten days prior to its release, which DIY magazine described as "a pretty unexpected move". Some have retrospectively characterized it as the first surprise album, while others describe it as an unconventional release strategy that preceded the surprise format. Radiohead's bassist, Colin Greenwood, said the band had several motivations, including the increased popularity of the internet as a tool for discovering music, frustrations with the traditional release and promotion format, the freedom of not being signed to a record label at the time, a desire to do something special and unique, and an interest in broadcasting their music directly to listeners globally at the same time. It also served as a countermeasure to Internet leaks of albums, which had become prevalent at the time. In Rainbows is also credited for starting the pay-what-you-want model.

After ending a tumultuous relationship with Interscope Records in 2007, the American band Nine Inch Nails independently released Ghosts I–IV and The Slip in 2008, following a two-week countdown teaser. Both were released free, with the option to purchase higher-quality digital or physical editions, and were released under a Creative Commons license to allow fans the ability to edit as they desired. The Nine Inch Nails manager, Jim Guerinot, said they hoped to pre-empt a leak and control the marketing: "Internet searches peak around the leak, not around the single or the album. By the time the album comes out, it's done."

In 2011, the American rappers Jay-Z and Kanye West advertised false release dates for their collaborative album Watch the Throne, in part an effort to pre-empt leaks. This strategy inspired the singer Frank Ocean to advance the release of his first album Channel Orange (2012) one week earlier than its publicized release date.

On January 8, 2013, Bowie surprise-released the music video for the single "Where Are We Now?" on YouTube, together with an album announcement for The Next Day, to be released two months later. Bowie had recorded the album between 2011 and 2012 in secrecy, requiring personnel involved to sign non-disclosure agreements. At the time, the public was convinced that Bowie had effectively retired. Following the album announcement, The Guardian's Alexis Petridis described it as the "biggest surprise the pop industry has seen in years".

=== 2013: Beyoncé and popularization ===
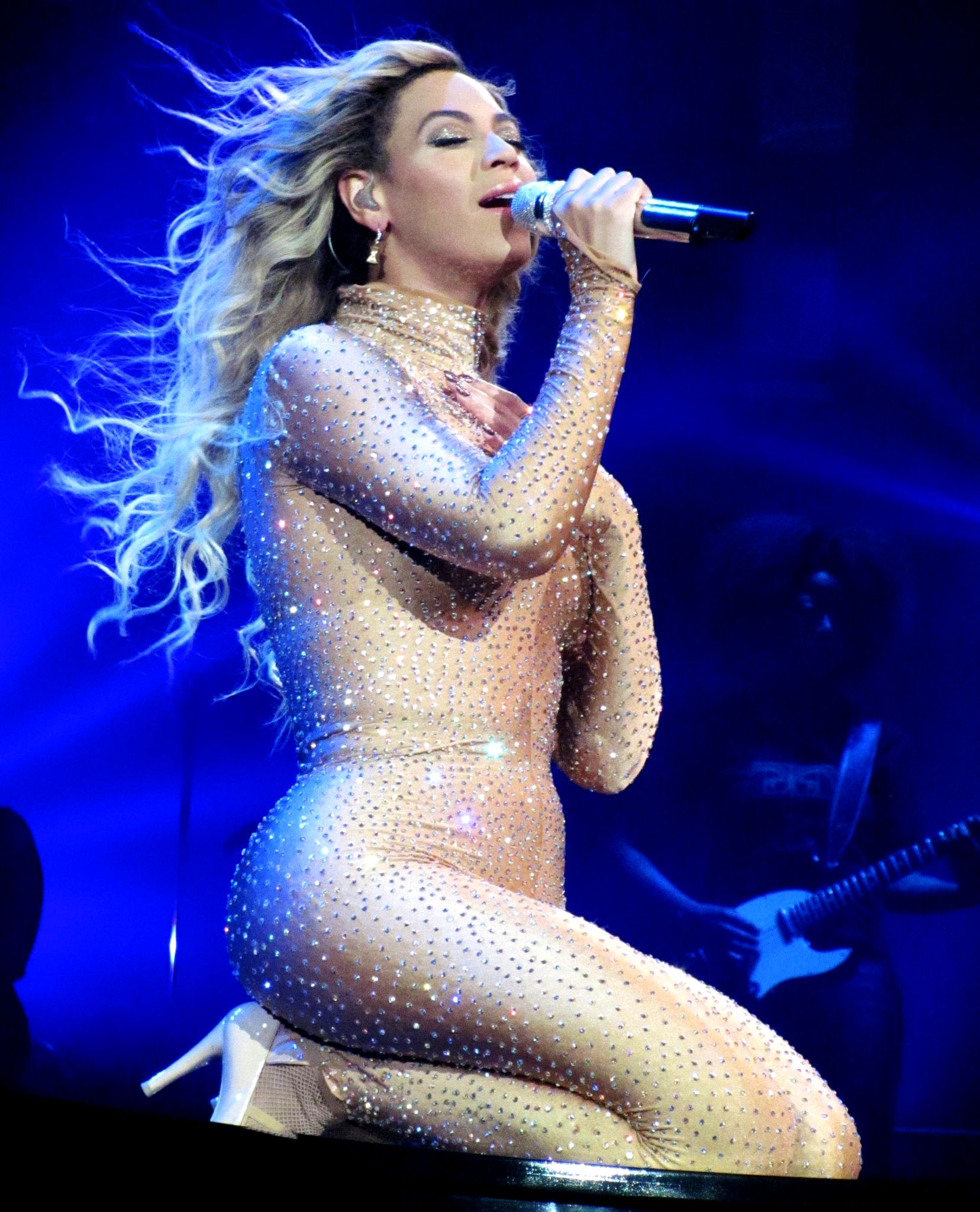
Beyoncé's self-titled studio album (2013) is often credited with popularizing surprise albums.

Beyoncé is credited with releasing the first surprise album with no prior announcement, leading to widespread popularization of the strategy. Beyoncé recorded her fifth studio album, Beyoncé (2013), in complete secrecy, working on it under a codename, "Lily", sharing details with only a small circle of people, and frequently shifting the release date. The album was kept a complete secret from the general public until its release on iTunes at midnight on Friday, December 13, 2013. The album was a commercial success, becoming the fastest-selling album in the history of iTunes within three days of its release, which ultimately contributed to the shifting of Global Release Day to Friday.

It is near-impossible to overstate the importance of Beyoncé's surprise drop. There was simply no precedent for an artist on or even near Bey’s level releasing any kind of secret musical project on an unsuspecting pop world... The album format, increasingly viewed by industry leaders as an inconvenient means to an end, was suddenly exciting again. It was arguably the single most pivotal moment in all of 21st-century pop music.

— Andrew Unterberger, Billboard

Beyoncé later explained that her intent was to reinstate the idea of an album release as a significant, exciting event that had lost meaning in the face of hype created around singles. Harley Brown of Vulture wrote, "Ever since Beyoncé's self-titled visual album appeared like a Christmas miracle on the iTunes store at midnight on a Thursday in December of 2013, the rules for how to release a record were rewritten literally overnight." Beyoncé's name became synonymous with surprise albums, adapting the release format for her follow-up album Lemonade (2016) and The Carters' Everything Is Love (2018).

=== 2014–2015: Increasing adoption ===
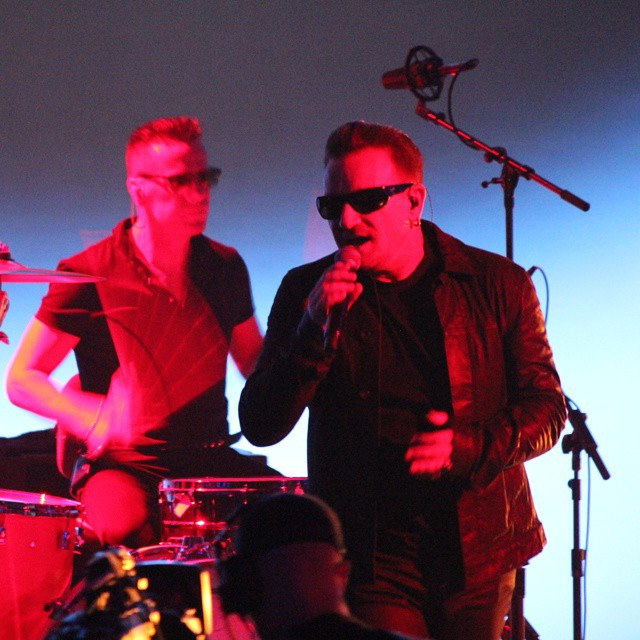
U2 performing at the Apple product launch at which Songs of Innocence was surprise announced in September 2014

The success of Beyoncé encouraged many artists to surprise-release their albums, with the strategy becoming an increasingly regular part of the music industry. In 2014, industry analysts began considering the surprise album strategy not just as an unprecedented move, but rather a mainstay of the release ecosystem. However, some music executives thought the surprise release was a "one-trick pony", questioning its lasting impact if the strategy became more widespread. Surprise releases from this year included Thom Yorke's Tomorrow's Modern Boxes, D'Angelo's Black Messiah, Skrillex's Recess, J. Cole's 2014 Forest Hills Drive and Kid Cudi's Satellite Flight: The Journey to Mother Moon. The response to surprise albums were varied in 2014; Skrillex saw his highest sales from the surprise release, while Kid Cudi had his smallest debut sales week. Irish rock band U2 partnered with Apple Inc. to surprise-release their 2014 studio album Songs of Innocence as an automatic download for all 500 million iTunes users. Many users did not want the album and several months after the release were frustrated that they could not delete the album from their devices.

In 2015, the music industry had fully entered the "surprise-album era", according to Vulture's Lindsay Zoladz. Artists increasingly used the format in different ways, such as by releasing music early in anticipation of leaks (as with Björk's Vulnicura and Madonna's Rebel Heart) or surprise-releasing music online for free (as with Miley Cyrus' Miley Cyrus & Her Dead Petz). Hip-hop artists particularly saw success with the surprise album format. Six out of the seven rap albums to reach number one on the Billboard 200 in 2015 were released with little-to-no promotion, including Drake's If You're Reading This It's Too Late and Kendrick Lamar's To Pimp a Butterfly, which successively broke the record for the most streams in a single day on Spotify.

Music critics described varying reactions to surprise albums in this period. Some described the surprise release as an innovative strategy that benefited fans, artists and record labels alike. Others said that while surprise albums were originally unusual and exciting events, their rising prevalence had led to a collective fatigue. Salon's Nico Lang described the surprise release strategy as having become "broken" and "gimmicky" in 2015, given that many artists merely surprise-released teasers, which stood in contrast to Beyoncé, whose surprise album was effective because of its fully secretive development. NME's Jeremy Allen wrote that some artists' attempts at surprise releases fell short of expectations that year—including Tyler, The Creator's Cherry Bomb and Earl Sweatshirt's I Don't Like Shit, I Don't Go Outside—as they relied too heavily on the surprise format to capture attention. Allen added that surprise releases could get fans' hopes up unrealistically, citing Rihanna's teased release of "Bitch Better Have My Money", where fans anticipated the release of a full album rather than a single.

=== 2016–2017: Widespread presence ===
By 2016, surprise albums had become the norm in the music industry, with many critics describing it as "the year of the surprise album". That year saw many high-profile surprise releases, including Beyoncé's Lemonade, Drake's Views, Rihanna's Anti, Radiohead's A Moon Shaped Pool, James Blake's The Colour in Anything, Chance The Rapper's Coloring Book, Skepta's Konnichiwa, Kendrick Lamar's untitled unmastered, and Frank Ocean's Endless and Blonde. Billboard's Andrew Unterberger said that artists who were still releasing lead singles and going on press tours in 2016 began to look old-world compared to the artists who surprised-released their music. Several major artists also released successful surprise albums in 2017, including Jay-Z's 4:44 and Kendrick's Lamar's DAMN.

In an article for The Ringer, Lindsay Zoladz wrote that many artists who released surprise albums in this time had prioritized promotional innovation over artistic innovation. Zoladz said that Lemonade was an effective surprise album because of its unexpected sonic and thematic experimentation, while the surprise albums from Radiohead, James Blake and Chance The Rapper were unadventurous and predictable. Zoladz concluded that at a time when the music landscape was oversaturated with surprise albums, Beyoncé had reinvigorated the format and guaranteed its continued pervasiveness.

The surprise release approach was regularly adopted outside of the music industry in this period. The production of the film 10 Cloverfield Lane was kept completely secret until a trailer was posted online two months before its release. American comedian Louis C.K. also used the strategy when he sent fans an email announcing the immediate availability of the web series Horace and Pete starring Steve Buscemi. Funny Or Die did not announce the production of the satirical film Donald Trump's The Art of The Deal: The Movie until its release, with screenwriter Joe Randazzo explaining that its surprise release was intended to create an exciting and unifying event for viewers.

=== 2018–2019: Growing disfavor ===
In 2018 and 2019, several publications suggested that the surprise release format had peaked in effectiveness. Vanity Fair's Erin Vanderhoof questioned whether the strategy had lost its spark due to an oversaturation of surprise albums within the market, citing Eminem's Kamikaze, the Carters' Everything Is Love, Meek Mill's Championships, and the Weeknd's My Dear Melancholy.

The surprise album format saw a decline in adoption, falling out of favor amongst major artists in the latter years of the 2010s decade. Both Vanderhoof and The Music Network's Sam Murphy attributed the decline to the evolving promotional strategies in the streaming era. Vanderhoof explained that, as a consequence of the streaming landscape, labels viewed albums as opportunities for playlist placement rather than complete artistic units. Similarly, Murphy wrote that the growing prominence of bundles and pre-adds made surprise drops less feasible, as artists relied on more calculated pre-release marketing efforts. Vulture's Harley Brown attributed the decline to the vinyl revival, as the vinyl production and distribution process can take months, precluding secretive releases.

=== 2020: Pandemic-driven boost ===
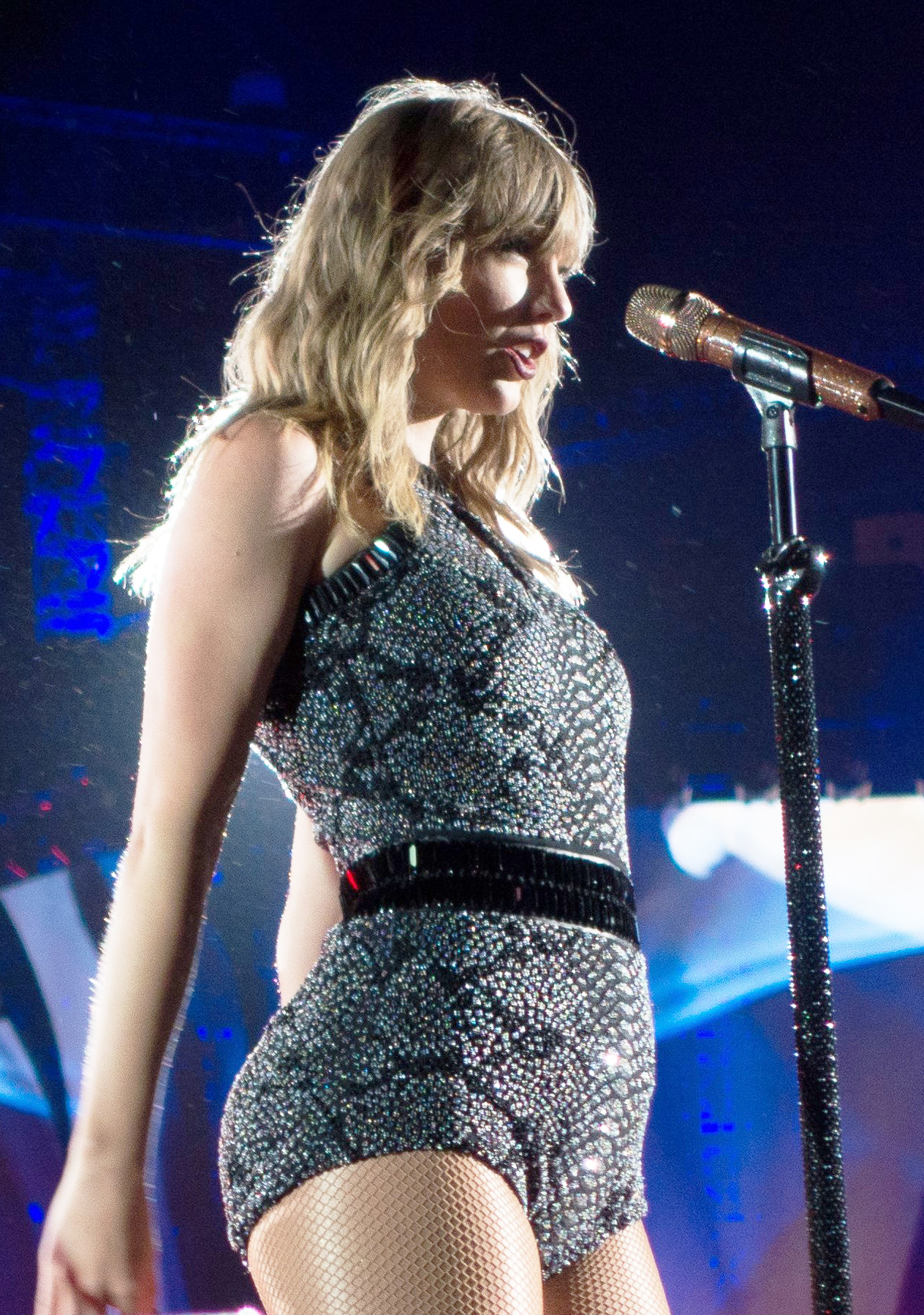
Taylor Swift's surprise album Folklore (2020) marked a departure from her previously extensive rollout campaigns, exemplifying the lasting ubiquity of the release format.

As the rise of social media platform TikTok underscored the prevailing attention economy in 2020, artists increasingly saw success by releasing music quickly to capitalize on sudden flashpoints, rather than sticking to methodically planned schedules. Additionally, the COVID-19 pandemic limited albums' rollout campaigns and physical releases. These factors contributed to the surprise releases of several records in 2020, including Ariana Grande's Positions, Eminem's Music to Be Murdered By, X's Alphabetland, Childish Gambino's 3.15.20, Drake's Dark Lane Demo Tapes, Bad Bunny's Las Que No Iban a Salir, Future's High Off Life, Carly Rae Jepsen's Dedicated Side B, and Run the Jewels' RTJ4.

Taylor Swift announced her 2020 studio album Folklore a day before its release, with its follow-up Evermore also being surprise-released five months later. Both albums were secretly recorded in isolation during the pandemic. Writing for Rolling Stone, Elias Leight described Swift's moves as an acknowledgement of the ubiquity of surprise albums, given that Swift was a "rare holdout" among major artists and an adherent of extensive promotional campaigns and lengthy release cycles. Vulture's Justin Curto suggested that Swift's capitulation to the surprise album trend could signal the end of the traditional rollout.

=== 2021–present: Decline and shifting trends ===
The surprise-release format experienced a decline in popularity following the pandemic, as artists relied on teasers, announcements and rollout campaigns to keep fans' attentions. This marked the end of the surprise album era, according to The Guardian's Gwilym Mumford and Highsnobiety's Sam Davies. Major artists who had previously adopted the surprise album strategy resorted to elaborate promotional campaigns, such as Kanye West's listening parties for Donda (2021), Taylor Swift's gradual tracklist reveal for Midnights (2022), and Drake's national billboard campaign for Certified Lover Boy (2021). Artists who continued to surprise-release music did not see the same commercial success, with Drake's follow-up surprise album Honestly, Nevermind (2022) debuting with a third of the sales of Certified Lover Boy.

Several journalists noted that Beyoncé's 2022 studio album Renaissance had a more traditional rollout than her previous albums, with a release date announcement, lead single and pre-orders. The New York Times saw the rollout as a reflection of the album's retro sound and themes, with Beyoncé eschewing a digital release in favor of elaborate vinyl and CD packages. Billboard writers thought that the release strategy for Renaissance was intended to counter the prevailing surprise album trend popularized by Beyoncé's own 2013 album, with The Wall Street Journal's Neil Shah suggesting that this may signal the end of the surprise album for good.

Despite this decline, late 2024 and 2025 saw the release of a few high-profile surprise albums, including Kendrick Lamar's GNX, Justin Bieber's Swag, Tyler, the Creator's Don't Tap the Glass, and Bring Me The Horizon's Post Human: Nex Gen. Billboard writers discussed whether this marked a return to the surprise album. Stephen Daw characterized it as a pivot in industry strategy, with artists being fatigued again by traditional album campaigns and wanting to generate attention in an increasingly fractured media ecosystem. Andrew Unterberger commented that at this point in time, Beyoncé acts as a bellwether for industry standards, with the release of her upcoming Act III project indicating the future release trends for the music industry. In May 2026, Drake, alongside the traditional release of Iceman, surprise released two studio albums, Maid of Honour and Habibti.

== Reception ==
Rachel Finn of DIY said that while surprise albums were becoming too common to be truly surprising, "it gives artists breathing space to really make an impact and retain control over the way their music is released, pre-empting album leaks and taking their album out of the pre-album press cycle to let the music speak for itself." Entrepreneur and freelance writer Cortney Harding wrote in a Medium article that while surprise albums give artists more flexibility, the strategy can usually only pay off for well-known musicians and can be problematic when the album is exclusive to a specific streaming service. David Sackllah of Consequence noted that, of the many artists to attempt a surprise release, rock bands failed to match the level of excitement of In Rainbows, while Beyoncé took the concept further and opened the floodgates for others. As noted by music journalist Lindsay Zoladz, the definition of "surprise album" is vague. Zoladz expressed criticism toward the overuse of the term that began to dilute its meaning as music journalists were using "surprise album" to describe albums that were previously announced. Zoladz and Lang both noted that surprise releases could be stressful both for music critics, who are under pressure to review the new material quickly, and for fans, who feel compelled to engage with the hype immediately.

Data from Luminate showed that surprise albums can make a larger impact than traditionally released albums. For Beyoncé and GNX, album-equivalent units consistently increased for several weeks as news about the releases spread, where as non-surprise albums did not see the same increases.

According to Variety's Robert Steiner, the surprise album is a high-risk, high-reward strategy that can either add to or detract from an artist's legacy. Steiner explained that what makes a surprise album successful is opportune timing, an invested fan base, and good music. Steiner provided examples for surprise albums that benefited from particular timing: Beyoncé released Beyoncé during a peak of her cultural impact and Lemonade after rumors of Jay-Z's infidelity, Taylor Swift released Folklore during the COVID-19 pandemic after tepid reception to her previous albums Reputation (2017) and Lover (2019), and Kendrick Lamar released GNX after his feud with Drake. Jessica Chou of Refinery29 characterized the surprise album as the "ultimate status symbol", with artists surprise-releasing their records to show that they can be highly successful without needing to conduct promotional campaigns.

== See also ==
- Album era
- Hidden track
