= Zild Benitez =

Filipino singer-songwriter, musician and producer

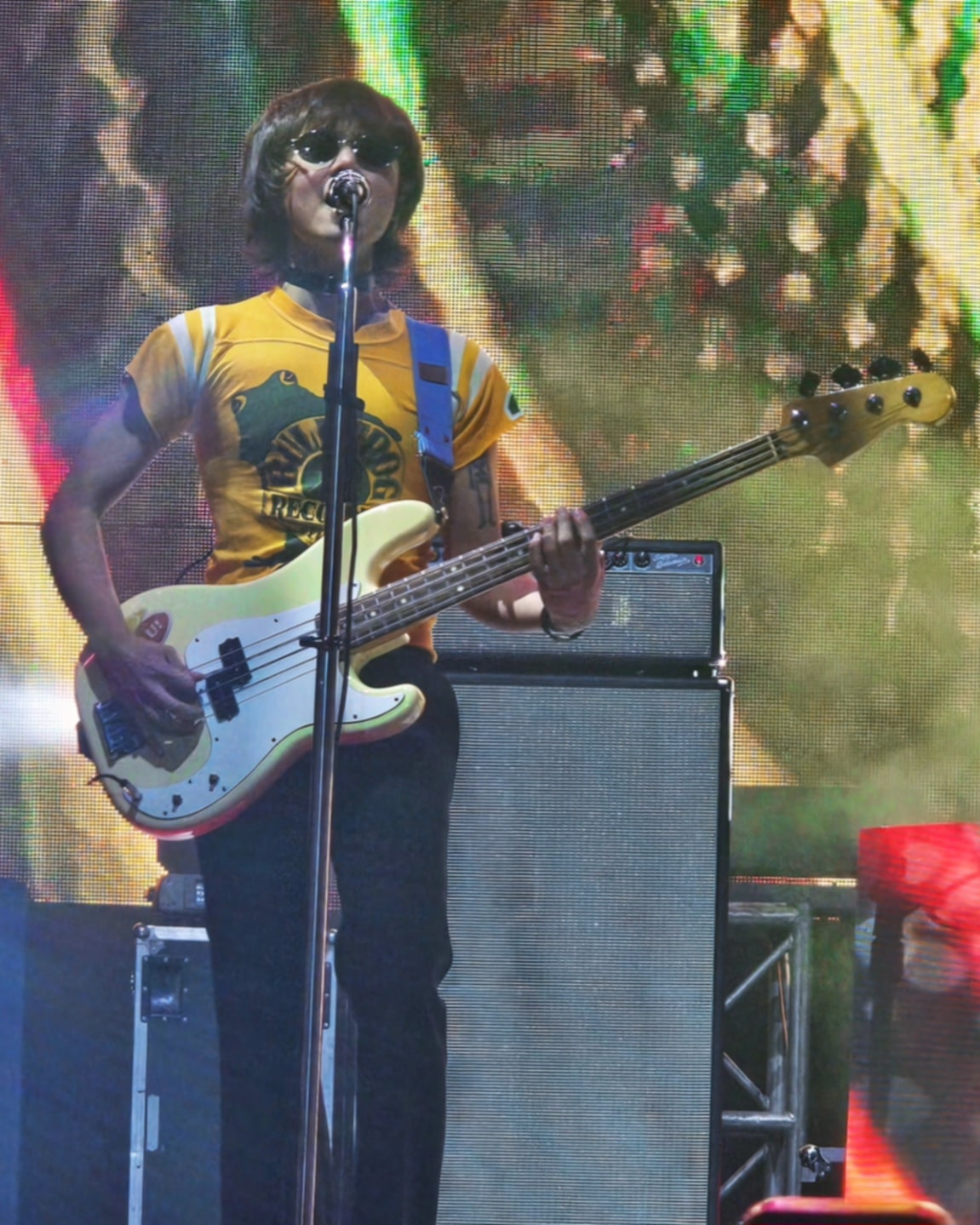
- Benitez in 2025

Background information
- Also known as: Zild
- Born: Daniel Zildjian Garon Benitez; April 23, 1997 (age 29); Quezon City, Philippines
- Genres: Alternative dance; OPM; psychedelic pop; soft rock; synthpop
- Occupations: Musician; singer-songwriter; Producer
- Instruments: Vocals; bass; guitar; piano; keyboards; synthesizers
- Years active: 2014–present
- Labels: Warner; Balcony Entertainment; Island; UMG
- Member of: IV of Spades

Daniel Zildjian Garon Benitez (born April 23, 1997), mononymously known as Zild, is a Filipino singer-songwriter, musician and producer. He is best known as the co-vocalist, pianist, keyboardist and bassist of the rock band IV of Spades, who went on an indefinite hiatus in 2020 and returned in 2025. As a solo artist, Benitez released his first studio album, Homework Machine, in 2020, and has since recorded and released three more studio albums. His latest studio album, Superpower, was released on August 9, 2024.

== Personal life ==
Zild Benitez is the son of Frank Benitez, the former drummer of Hungry Young Poets and Barbie's Cradle. He graduated at De La Salle-College of St. Benilde in 2018 with a Bachelor of Arts degree in Music Production.

During his childhood and teenage years, he became a commercial model for various brands in the Philippines, including Lucky Me! Pancit Canton, Coca-Cola, and Nido. He also had a cameo role in one of ABS-CBN's primetime like "Got to Believe".

== Career ==
=== IV of Spades ===
In June 2014, Allan Mitchell Silonga decided to form a band for his son Blaster, who would become the band's lead guitarist. The Silongas were able to recruit drummer Badjao de Castro and bassist Zildjian "Zild" Benitez, who are the sons of Allan's friends. Unique Salonga, Benitez's churchmate who was already writing his own music, was later recruited to become the band's lead singer.

The band later signed to Warner Music Philippines and released their first single "Ilaw sa Daan".

On 2018, IV of Spades won the New Artist of the Year and the MYX Bandarito Performance of the Year and Nominated as Group the Year at the annual Myx Music Awards. The band also won the Dreams Come True with Air Asia, the airline's search for the most promising acts in the region. The band performed with David Foster as part of their prize. They also won the Favorite New Group award at the 30th annual Awit Awards.

Before their dissolution, Benitez handled the responsibility of lead vocals after their former lead vocalist Unique Salonga who left to pursue "personal endeavors". Months later, the band released their debut studio album, ClapClapClap!, on January 18, 2019.

=== Manila Magic ===
Benitez is also a member of electronic pop duo Manila Magic, with Tim Marquez of One Click Straight.

=== Solo career ===
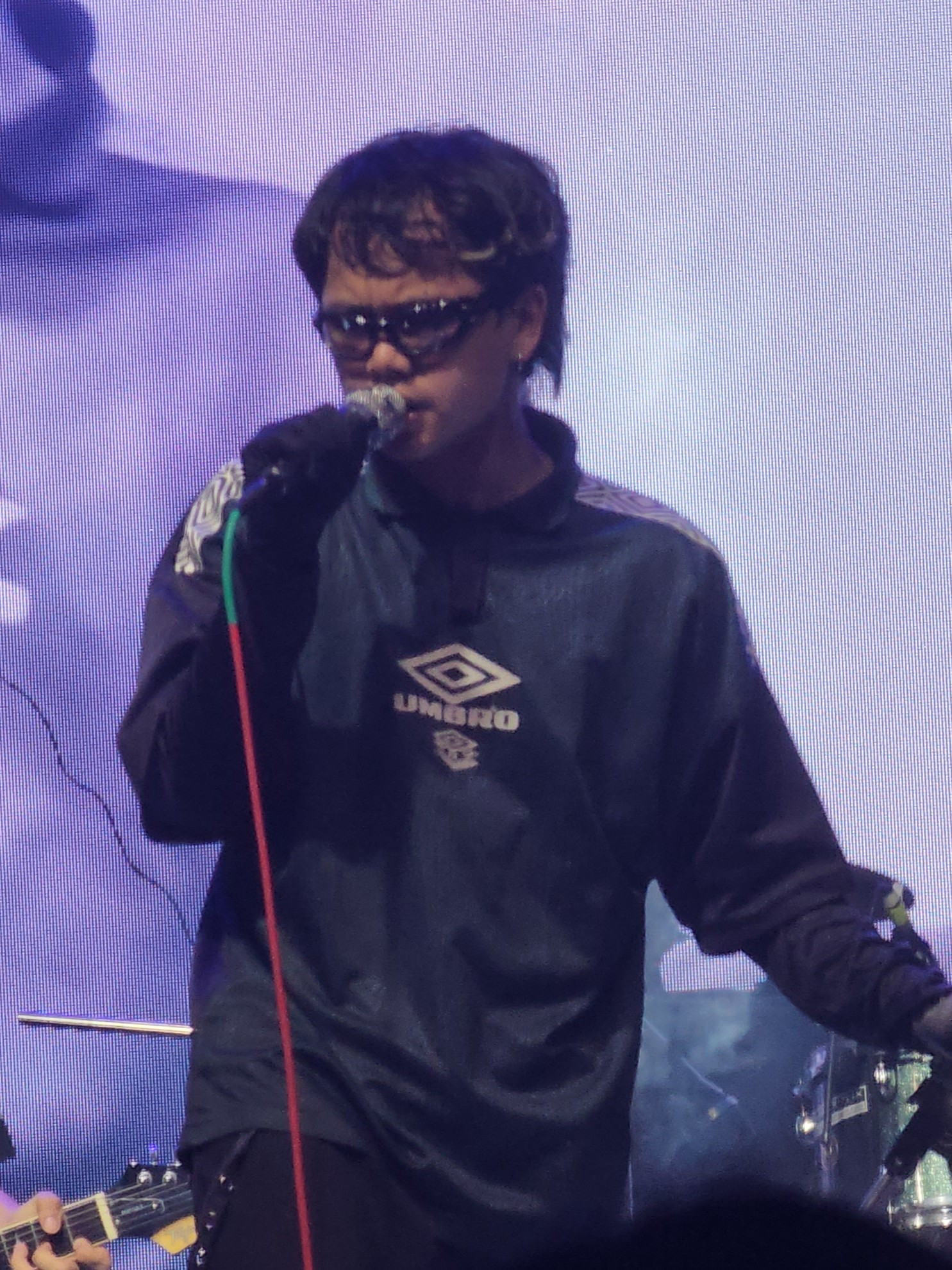
Benitez in 2024

On August 13, 2016, Benitez joined a music competition named "Music Hero" in the noontime show Eat Bulaga!. He originally won the "Bass Hero" title, but due to IV of Spades' rise to fandom, he and his bandmate, Blaster Silonga, who also won the "Electric Guitar Hero" title, left their titles and gave it up.

On June 12, 2020, Benitez released the music video of "Sinungaling" on YouTube. Few weeks later, he also released "Dila", along with its music video on July 9, 2020. On August 6, 2020, he released his debut solo album titled "Homework Machine". It features "Sinungaling" and "Dila" which were released beforehand. In the same year, Benitez signed an artist management contract with Rico Blanco's management label Balcony Entertainment.

On February 10, 2021, Benitez released the music video for his song "Kyusi" on YouTube. Weeks later, he released "Apat" on February 25, he also revealed that "Kyusi" and "Apat" would be part of his upcoming album titled "Huminga", which was released on April 8, 2021. That same year he featured with Ben&Ben and Juan Karlos on the track "Lunod"

In August 2022, Benitez officially signed with UMG Philippines through its division Island Records Philippines. That same month, he released his first single for his third album Medisina, "Isang Anghel", which was followed by "Duwag" in September. The following month, Medisina was released alongside its third single, "Duda". In 2023, he featured with juan karlos on the track "Gabi" on the former's album, Sad Songs And Bullshit Part 1.

In June 2024, a fourth album was announced, followed shortly by the release of its first single, "Segurista". Its second single, "Lia", was released on July 9, 2024. The album, "Superpower", was released on August 9, 2024.

== Discography ==
=== Solo ===
- Homework Machine (2020)
- Huminga (2021)
- Medisina (2022)
- Superpower (2024)

=== With the IV of Spades ===
- CLAPCLAPCLAP! (2019)
- Andalucia (2025)
- Tropical Dream (2026)

== Accolades ==
Award	Year	Category	Recipient	Result	Ref.
Myx Music Awards	2021	Rock Video of the Year	"Dila"	Nominated	
New Hue Video Music Awards	2021	Music Video of the Year	"Lia"	Won	
Wish Music Awards	2021	Wish Rock/Alternative Song of the Year	"Sinungaling"	Nominated	
Wish Music Awards	2021	Wish Breakthrough Artist of the Year	Zild	Won	
Wish Music Awards	2022	Wish Song Collaboration of the Year	"Lunod" (shared with Ben&Ben and Juan Karlos Labajo)	Won	
Wish Music Awards	2025	Wish Rock/Alternative Song of the Year	"Segurista"	Nominated	
Wish Music Awards	2025	Wishclusive Rock/Alternative Performance of the Year	"Medisina"	Nominated	
Filipino Music Awards	2025	Alternative Song of the Year	"I.N.A.S."	Won	
