= IV of Spades =

Filipino pop rock band

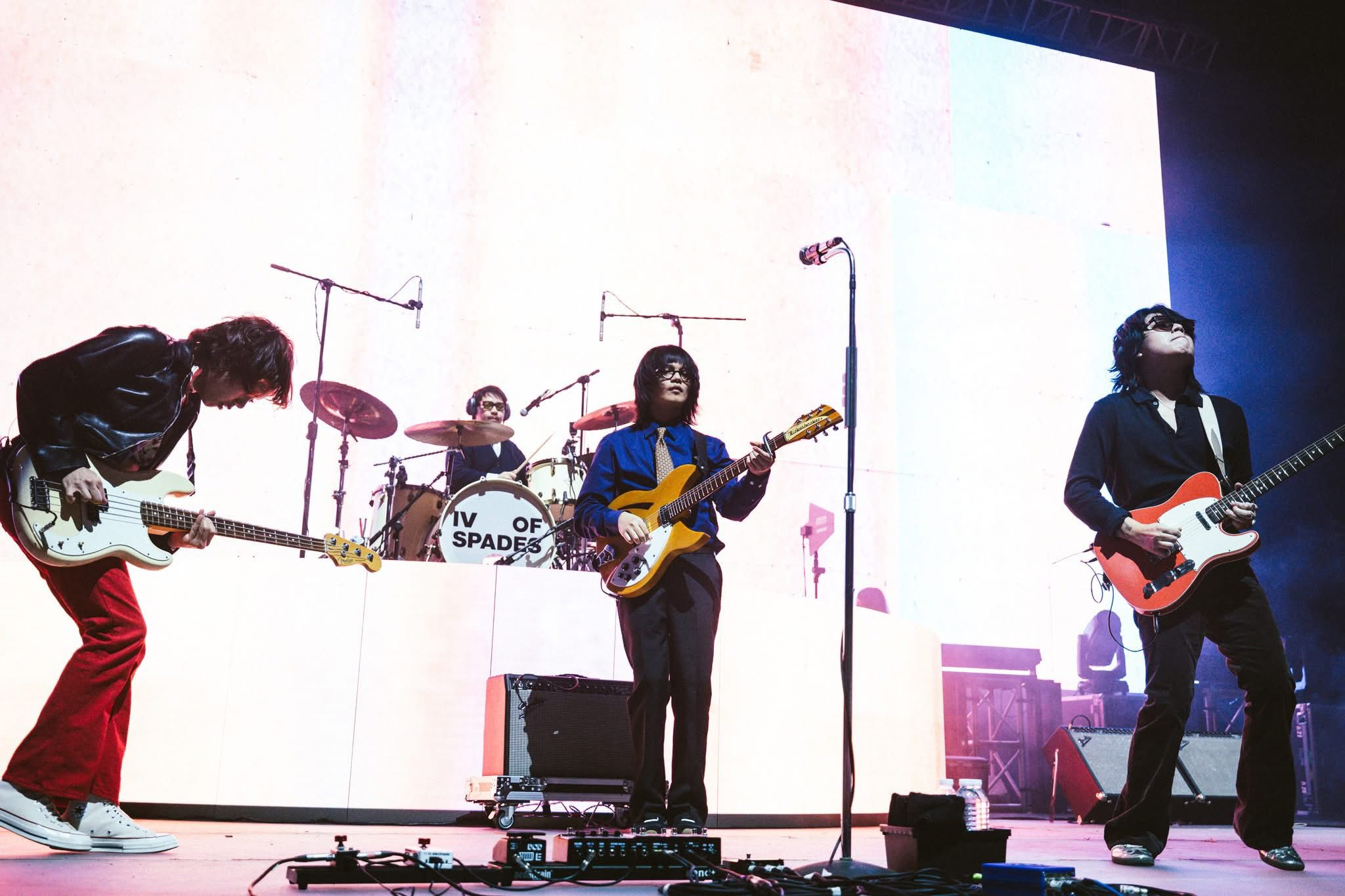
- IV of Spades performing at the MOA Arena on December 12, 2025. Left to right: Zild Benitez, Badjao de Castro, Unique Salonga, Blaster Silonga

Background information
- Also known as: IVOS
- Origin: Metro Manila
- Genres: Pop rock; indie; funk rock
- Years active: 2014–2020; 2025–present
- Labels: Warner; Sony
- Members: Zild Benitez; Blaster Silonga; Badjao de Castro; Unique Salonga
- Website: ivofspades.com

IV of Spades (stylized in all caps; pronounced "Four of Spades" and often shortened as "IVOS") is a Filipino rock band from Metro Manila, Philippines that formed in 2014, consisting of Zild Benitez (vocals, bass and keyboards), Blaster Silonga (vocals, lead guitar), Badjao de Castro (vocals, drums), and Unique Salonga (vocals, rhythm guitar). The band first gained exposure with the release of their fourth single, "Mundo" (2018). Their first album, ClapClapClap!, was released on January 18, 2019. The band went on hiatus on August 21, 2020, and returned in 2025 with the release of their single "Aura" and subsequently released their second album Andalucia, on November 5, 2025.

Prior to their 2020 hiatus, their musical style was described as "pop funk" and funk rock by the local press. (Note: Attributed to multiple sources) The band was also known for their 1970s-inspired outfits. IV of Spades has been nominated and won several musical awards, both in the Philippines and internationally.

Since their comeback in 2025, numerous outlets have dubbed their sound as pinoy rock, alt-rock, soft-rock and pop, in reference to their sophomore album Andalucia.

== History ==
=== 2014–2017: Early years ===
In July 2014, Allan Mitchell Silonga, also known as "Daddy A", planned and decided to form a band for his son Blaster, who would become the band's lead guitarist and vocalist. Daddy A handpicked and recruited drummer Badjao de Castro and bassist Zild Benitez, who are the sons of Daddy A's musician friends Franklin Benitez and Chuck de Castro. Unique Salonga, one of the band's vocalists, was recruited last by Daddy A through his father Randy Salonga, who used to play guitars for Daddy A's vocal group Daddy's Home. Unique already writing his own music, and was later recruited to become the band's lead singer.

Most of the band members are sons of musicians. Blaster's father, Allan Silonga (aka Daddy A), is a member of a band in the 90s, Kindred Garden, which evolved as K24/7, the first R&B and Hip-hop band during that era. He was also part of the singing group, Daddy's Home, which finished third in The X Factor Philippines. Zild's father, Franklin Benitez, was the drummer for the Hungry Young Poets and Barbie's Cradle. Badjao's father, Chuck de Castro, was a member of Makatha & Posivity Band and was also a session rhythm guitarist of the Rage Band. Blaster and Zild gained popularity when they became contestants for Eat Bulaga!'s hit contest, Music Hero. Zild was the first member of the Music Hero Squad and was the Bass Guitar grand champion; Blaster won the Electric Guitar grand champion and the title of Ultimate Music Hero.

IV of Spades signed to a record label and released their debut single "Ilaw sa Daan" (transl. street light) under Warner Music Philippines.

The group's second single, “Hey Barbara” was released on July 9, 2017, and followed up by their third single “Where Have You Been My Disco?”, released on December 9, 2017.

=== 2018–2019: "Mundo", Unique's departure and ClapClapClap! studio album ===
In 2018, the band released their fourth single called "Mundo". A video of their live performance on the song, which was uploaded on Metro Manila-based radio station Wish 107.5's YouTube channel, became the group's highest viewed single on YouTube with 176 million views as of September 2024.

IV of Spades won the New Artist of the Year, MYX Bandarito Performance of the Year, and nominated as Group of the Year at the annual MYX Music Awards. The band also won the Dreams Come True with Air Asia, the airline's search for the most promising acts in the region. The band performed with David Foster as part of their prize. They also won the Favorite New Group award at the 30th annual Awit Awards.

On May 5, 2018, the band announced on their official social media accounts that lead vocalist Unique Salonga had left in order to pursue personal endeavors.

On July 12, 2018, the song "In My Prison" was released simultaneously on Spotify and YouTube. It is the band's first single after Salonga's departure, with Benitez taking over full-time as lead vocalist. They released their sixth single, "Bata, Dahan-Dahan!" on September 14, 2018. After they released their sixth single, they released another single "Sa Kahapon" and this time, with hip-hop artist and rapper Shanti Dope for Coke Studio Homecoming.

In October, IV of Spades was nominated for the Best Southeast Asia Act category in the 2018 MTV Europe Music Awards but lost to Joe Flizzow of Malaysian hip-hop group Too Phat. Within the same month, they returned to Wish 107.5 and collaborated with Moira dela Torre with a new song entitled "Huli Na Ba Ang Lahat". The song was first unveiled during a digital concert held on October 8, 2018. The show, staged by Acer Philippines in partnership with Wish 107.5, was part of the annually-held Acer Day celebration.

The band released their first studio album, ClapClapClap!, on January 18, 2019. It consisted of 15 songs, the most popular being Come Inside of My Heart.

=== 2020–2024: Hiatus ===
The band then released their seventh single entitled "Ang Pinagmulan", on February 16, 2020. After 2 months, they released their final single recorded "Sariling Multo (Sa Panaginip)", on April 17, 2020. On August 21, 2020, the band announced their hiatus. The band members have since been focused on other solo and group projects outside of IV of Spades.

=== 2025–present: Reunion, Andalucia, Tropical Dream ===
On July 16, 2025, IV of Spades announced their return from hiatus with the release of a single titled "Aura". Salonga had also rejoined the band. On August 13, the band surprise-released their second single, titled "Nanaman" (lit. 'Again'). On August 29, at the Wish 107.5 11th anniversary concert, the band announced that they will be releasing their second album titled Andalucia, which was later released on November 5, 2025.The band later surprise-released two more singles titled "Konsensya" (lit. Conscience) on September 10 and "Suliranin" (lit. Problem) on October 8.

The band performed at the inaugural Filipino Music Awards at the SM Mall of Asia Arena on October 21, 2025. On December 12 and 13, they held their solo concert at the same venue.

The band then commenced on a nationwide tour the following year, making stops at Davao, Santa Rosa, Cagayan de Oro, Cebu, and Baguio. On September 9, the band has offically released their long-unreleased single, titled "Isang Pag-Ibig". The band embarked on a North America tour from October 3 to October 18, 2026. During the tour, they released a track titled "Rollercoaster" on October 7. On November 11, they released another single, "Susundan", and announced their upcoming third studio album, titled "Tropical Dream" which is scheduled for release on December 9, 2026.

== Musical style and influences ==
IV of Spades is heavily inspired by 1970s fashion, acts and sounds. Members of the band have cited various musical groups and artists as songwriting influences, including ABBA, Kings of Leon, The Beatles, Tame Impala, My Chemical Romance, Radiohead, and Jet.

== Band members ==
- Zild Benitez – lead and backing vocals, bass guitar (2014–2020, 2025–present); keyboards, synth bass, programming (2018–2020, 2025–present); omnichord (2025–present)
- Blaster Silonga – lead guitar, backing vocals (2014–2020, 2025–present); lead vocals (2018–2020, 2025–present)
- Badjao de Castro – drums, percussion (2014–2020, 2025–present); backing vocals (2018–2020, 2025–present); lead vocals (2019, 2025–present)
- Unique Salonga – lead vocals, rhythm guitar (2014–2018, 2025–present); backing vocals (2025–present)

== Discography ==
- ClapClapClap! (2019)
- Andalucia (2025)
- Tropical Dream (2026)

== Tours ==
Headlining

- The Sweet Shadow Tour (2019)
- IV of Spades Live at the MOA Arena (2025)
- Andalucia Tour (2026)
- US & Canada Tour (2026)

Supporting

- Panic! At the Disco – Pray for the Wicked Tour (2018)

== Awards and nominations ==
Name of the award ceremony, year presented, award category, nominee(s) of the award, and the result of the nomination
Award ceremony	Year	Category	Nominee(s)/work(s)	Result	Ref.
Awit Awards	2018	Best Performance by a Group Recording Artist	"Hey Barbara"	Won	
Awit Awards	2018	Favorite Performance by a Group Recording Artist	"Hey Barbara"	Won	
Awit Awards	2018	Record of the Year	"Hey Barbara"	Won	
Awit Awards	2018	Music Video Of The Year	"Where Have You Been, My Disco"	Won	
Awit Awards	2019	Music Video of the Year	"Take That Man"	Nominated	
Awit Awards	2019	Record of the Year	"Mundo"	Nominated	
Awit Awards	2019	Song of the Year	"Mundo"	Nominated	
Awit Awards	2020	Album of the Year	"ClapClapClap!"	Won	
Awit Awards	2020	Record of the Year	"Bawat Kaluluwa"	Won	
Awit Awards	2026	Best Sound Engineer Recording	"Monster"	Won	
Awit Awards	2026	Best Performance by a Group	"Monster"	Nominated	
Awit Awards	2026	Best Musical Arrangement	"Monster"	Nominated	
Awit Awards	2026	Best Musical Arrangement	"Suliranin"	Nominated	
Awit Awards	2026	Best Cover Art	"Aura"	Nominated	
Awit Awards	2026	Best Music Video	"Aura"	Nominated	
Awit Awards	2026	Song of the Year	"Aura"	Won	
Awit Awards	2026	Record of the Year	"Konsensya"	Nominated	
Awit Awards	2026	Producer of the Year	"IV Of Spades"	Nominated	
Awit Awards	2026	Album of the Year	"Andalucia"	Won	
Filipino Music Awards	2025	Rock Song of the Year	"Aura"	Won	
Filipino Music Awards	2025	People’s Choice Awards — Song	"Aura"	Nominated	
Filipino Music Awards	2025	Song of the Year	"Aura"	Nominated	
LionHearTV RAWR Awards	2018	Hugot Song of the Year	"Mundo"	Won	
Monster RX 93.1 Music Awards	2026	OPM Comeback Artist of the Year	IV of Spades	Won	
MOR Pinoy Music Awards	2019	Band of the Year	"Mundo"	Nominated	
MOR Pinoy Music Awards	2019	Song of the Year	"Mundo"	Nominated	
MTV European Music Awards	2018	Best Southeast Asian Act	"IV of Spades"	Nominated	
MYX Music Awards	2018	Group of the Year	"IV of Spades"	Nominated	
MYX Music Awards	2018	Myx Bandarito Performance of the Year	"IV of Spades"	Won	
MYX Music Awards	2018	New Artist of the Year	"IV of Spades"	Won	
MYX Music Awards	2019	Artist of the Year	"IV of Spades"	Nominated	
MYX Music Awards	2019	Group of the Year	"IV of Spades"	Nominated	
MYX Music Awards	2019	Music Video of the Year	"In My Prison"	Nominated	
MYX Music Awards	2019	Rock Video of the Year	"In My Prison"	Won	
MYX Music Awards	2019	Song of the Year	"Mundo"	Won	
MYX Music Awards	2020	Artist of the Year	"IV of Spades"	Nominated	
MYX Music Awards	2020	Collaboration of the Year	"Nagbabalik" (with Rico Blanco)	Nominated	
MYX Music Awards	2020	Music Video of the Year	"Come Inside of My Heart"	Nominated	
MYX Music Awards	2020	Rock Video of the Year	"Come Inside of My Heart"	Won	
MYX Music Awards	2020	Song of the Year	"Come Inside of My Heart"	Nominated	
MYX Music Awards	2021	Music Video of the Year	"Ang Pinagmulan"	Nominated	
MYX Music Awards	2021	Rock Video of the Year	"Ang Pinagmulan"	Nominated	
PMPC Star Awards for Music	2021	Duo/Group Concert Performer of the Year	"Rico Blanco x IV of Spades Live in Concert!"	Nominated	
Village Pipol Choice Awards	2019	Group Performer of the Year	"IV of Spades"	Nominated	
Wish Music Awards	2018	Wishclusive Urban Performance of the Year	"Ilaw Sa Daan"	Won	
Wish Music Awards	2018	Wish Promising Artist of the Year	"IV of Spades"	Nominated	
Wish Music Awards	2018	Wish Rock/Alternative Song of the Year	"Hey Barbara"	Nominated	
Wish Music Awards	2019	Wishclusive Collaboration of the Year	"Huli Na Ba Ang Lahat" (with Moira Dela Torre)	Nominated	
Wish Music Awards	2019	Wishclusive Rock/Alternative Performance of the Year	"Mundo"	Won	
Wish Music Awards	2019	Wish Group of the Year	"IV of Spades"	Won	
Wish Music Awards	2019	Wish Rock/Alternative Song of the Year	"In My Prison"	Nominated	
Wish Music Awards	2020	Wishclusive Rock/Alternative Performance of the Year	"Bawa't Kaluluwa"	Won	
Wish Music Awards	2020	Wish Group of the Year	"IV of Spades"	Nominated	
Wish Music Awards	2020	Wish Rock/Alternative Song of the Year	"Nagbabalik"	Won	
