= Unique Salonga =

Filipino singer-songwriter, musician and producer

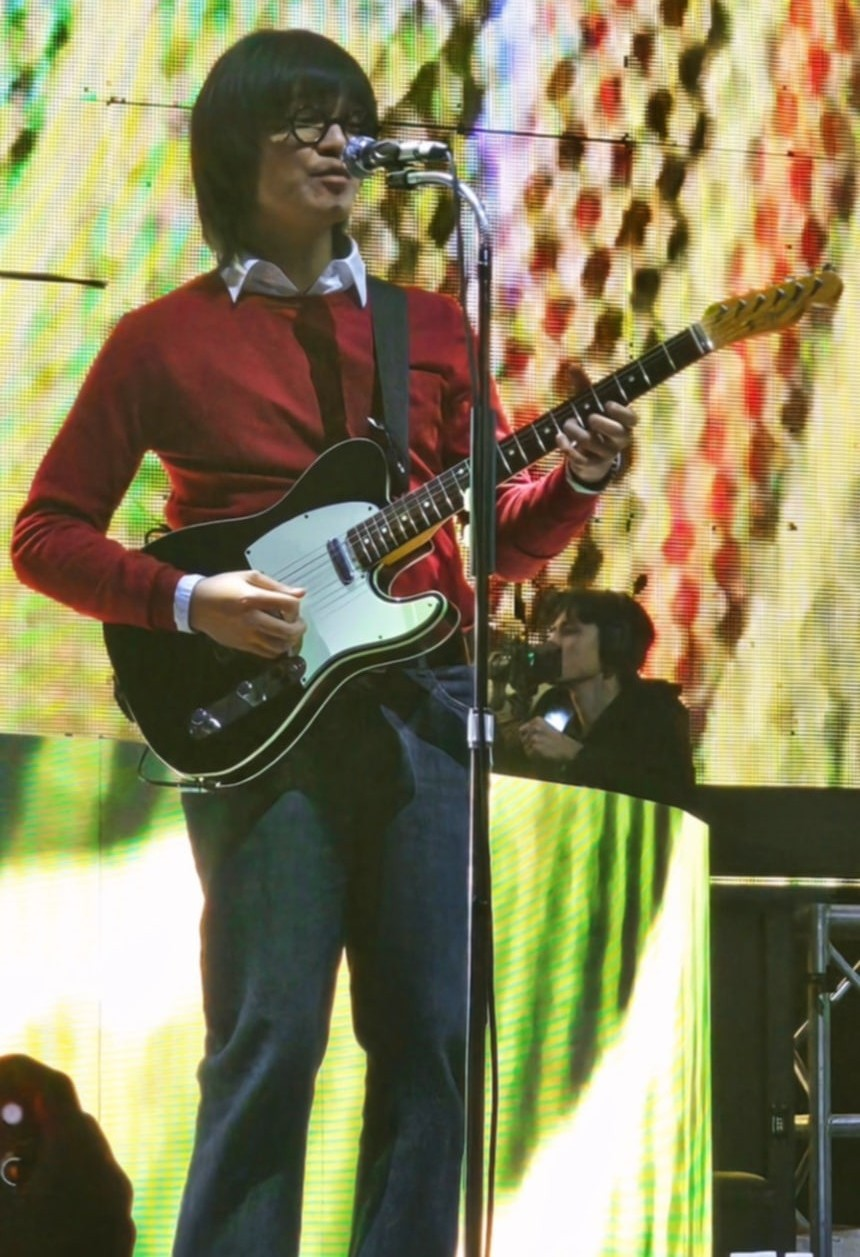
- Salonga in 2025

Background information
- Born: Unique Torralba Salonga; April 26, 2000 (age 26); Manila, Philippines
- Genres: Pinoy rock; psychedelic rock; experimental
- Occupations: Musician; singer-songwriter; producer
- Instruments: Vocals; guitar
- Years active: 2014–present
- Label: O/C
- Member of: IV of Spades

Unique Torralba Salonga (born April 26, 2000) is a Filipino singer-songwriter, musician and producer. He is best known as the lead vocalist and rhythm guitarist of the alternative rock band IV of Spades. He left the band to focus on a solo career and released his first studio album Grandma in 2018, and has since recorded and released two more studio albums. His latest and third studio album Daisy, was released on September 29, 2023. He later rejoined and reunited with the band in 2025.

== Career ==
=== Band frontman ===
==== 2014–2018: IV of Spades ====
In June 2014, Allan Silonga decided to form a band for his son Blaster, who would become the band's lead guitarist. The Silongas were able to recruit drummer Badjao de Castro and bassist Zild Benitez, who are the sons of Allan's friends. Unique Salonga, who was already writing his own music, was later recruited to become the band's lead singer.

IV of Spades signed to a record label and released their first single "Ilaw sa Daan" under Warner Music Philippines.

The group's second single, "Hey Barbara" was released on July 9, 2017, and followed up by their third single "Where Have You Been My Disco?", released on December 9, 2017, via YouTube.

In 2018, the band released their fourth single called "Mundo". It became the group's highest viewed single on YouTube. The band's videos have over 100 million views on YouTube.

IV of Spades won the New Artist of the Year and the MYX Bandarito Performance of the Year and Nominated as Group of the Year at the annual Myx Music Awards. The band also won Dreams Come True with AirAsia, the airline's search for the most promising acts in the region. The band performed with David Foster as part of their prize. They also won the Favorite New Group award at the 30th annual Awit Awards.

On May 4, 2018, Unique Salonga left IV of Spades in order to pursue a solo career.

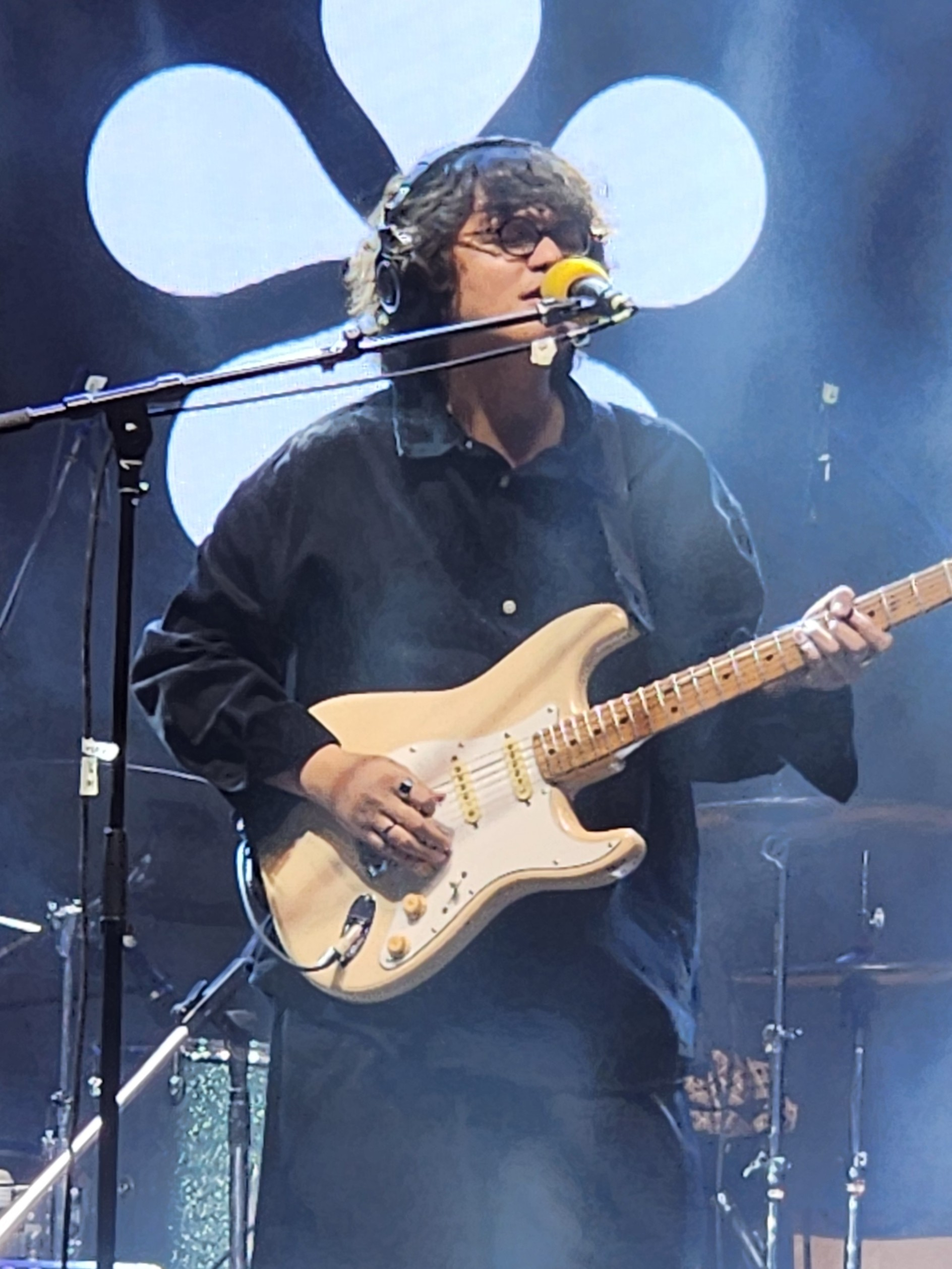
Salonga in 2024

=== Solo career ===
==== 2018–2025 ====
In 2018, Salonga released his debut single, Midnight Sky, under the label of O/C Records of VIVA. In the same year, Salonga released his debut album, Grandma, and his first solo concert was held on September 29, 2018.

He released his second album, Pangalan: in 2020.

On September 29, 2023, Salonga released his third album, Daisy.

=== Reunion with IV of Spades ===
==== 2025-present ====
On July 16, 2025, Salonga made his official return to the band by releasing their new single, "Aura", which also marks the official return of IV of Spades.

== Discography ==
=== Albums ===
List of studio albums with selected details
Title	Album details	Ref.
Grandma	Released: August 13, 2018; Label: O/C Records; Format: Digital download, streaming, 12"	
Pangalan:	Released: March 27, 2020; Label: O/C Records; Format: Digital download, streaming	
Daisy	Released: September 29, 2023; Label: O/C Records; Format: Digital download, streaming	

=== Singles ===
==== As lead artist ====
List of singles as lead artist, showing year released and album name
Title	Year	Peak chart positions	Album
Title	Year	PHL	Album
"Midnight Sky"	2018	—	Grandma
"Cha-Ching!"	2018	—	Grandma
"Sino"	2019	24	Grandma
"Lamang Lupa"	2019	—	Pangalan:
"Bukod Tangi"	2019	—	Pangalan:
"Huwag Ka Sanang Magagalit"	2019	—	Pangalan:
"Mga Katulad Mo"	2021	—	Pangalan:
"Reality Checklist"	2021	—	Non-album single
"Oblivion"	2022	—	Non-album single
"Panahon"	2023	—	Daisy
"—" denotes releases that did not chart or were not released in that region.

== Accolades ==
Year	Award	Category	Notable Works	Result	Ref.
2019	32nd Awit Award	Best Cover Art	Grandma	Won	
2019	14th Myx Music Awards	Male Artist of the Year	Unique	Nominated	
2019	14th Myx Music Awards	Rock Video of the Year	"Cha-Ching!"	Nominated	
2020	5th Wish Music Awards	Wish Rock/Alternative Song of the Year	"Bukod-Tangi"	Nominated	
2020	15th Myx Music Awards	Rock Video of the Year	"Sino"	Nominated	
2021	6th Wish Music Awards	Wishclusive Rock/Alternative Song of the Year	"Sino"	Won	
2021	6th Wish Music Awards	Wish Rock/Alternative Song of the Year	"Huwag Ka Sanang Magagalit"	Nominated	
2024	37th Awit Award	Album of the Year	Daisy	Won	
