= Sheena (singer) =

Filipino singer and dancer (born 2004)

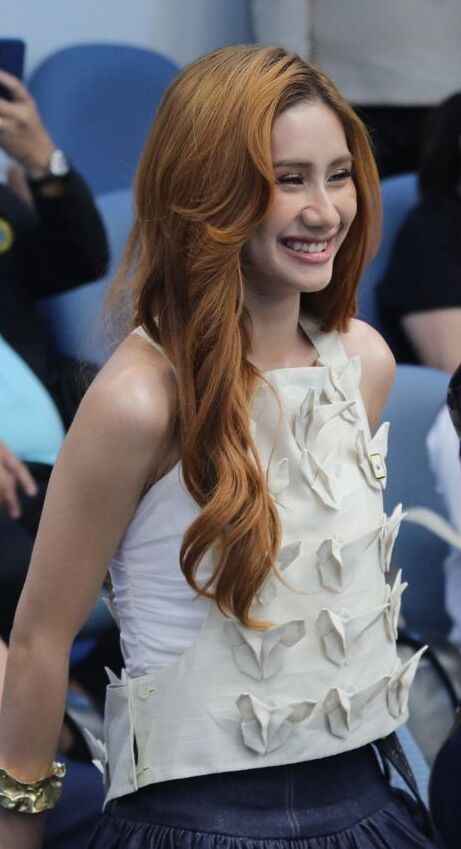
- Sheena at the Senate of the Philippines in May 2026
- Born: Sheena Mae Manuel Catacutan; May 9, 2004 (age 22); Santiago, Isabela, Philippines
- Occupations: Singer; dancer
- Years active: 2020–present
- Musical career
- Genres: P-pop; bubblegum pop; teen pop; EDM
- Instruments: Vocals
- Label: Star
- Member of: Bini

Signature
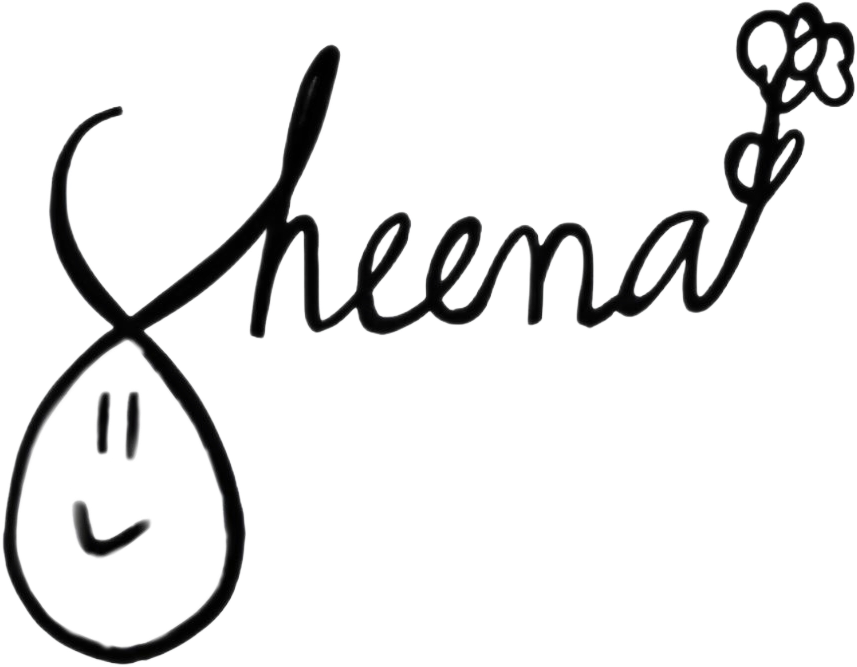

Sheena Mae Manuel Catacutan (born May 9, 2004), known mononymously as Sheena, is a Filipino singer and dancer under Star Music. She is the youngest member, main dancer, and one of the sub vocalists of the Filipino girl group Bini. She was a contestant on Pinoy Big Brother: Otso (2018) with fellow Bini member, Gwen Apuli. In 2025, she portrayed herself in an episode of the anthology series Maalaala Mo Kaya, which depicted her life story. She was also nominated as Viral TikTok of the Year category at VP Choice Awards 2025.

== Early life and education ==
Sheena Mae Catacutan was born on May 9, 2004. She grew up with her single mother, Angelyn, her grandparents and her brother. Angelyn died in 2020 while Sheena was a trainee. Her grandparents and brother live in Santiago, Isabela, where she was born and raised. She is an Ibanag.

Sheena began dancing the age of seven and joined dance workshops in kindergarten. She participated in dance competitions in elementary school and participated in competitions in pop dance, cheer dance and street dance. In high school, she joined a dance group that also competed in dance competitions, especially hip hop. She graduated from high school at the Japan-Philippines Institute of Technology in 2026.

== Career ==
In 2018, she auditioned for Star Hunt Academy (SHA), ABS-CBN's P-pop idol training program, held in Isabela. She first auditioned to be cast in the teen edition of ABS-CBN's reality program Pinoy Big Brother: Otso, where she became an official contestant (housemate), alongside Gwen. After being evicted from Pinoy Big Brother, Sheena was scouted to become a trainee in SHA in 2019.

In November 2020, Sheena officially became a member of ABS-CBN Entertainment's girl group Bini, which officially debuted on June 11, 2021.

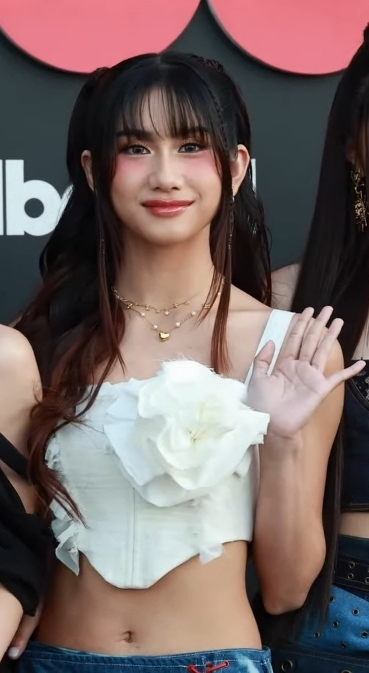
Sheena at the Billboard Korea K-Power event in August 2024

As a member of Bini, Sheena created the choreography for the group's 2023 single "Pantropiko". She is also associated with the usage of the phrase "eyyy" in Filipino parlance, often paired with the hand gesture of extending both thumb and pinky finger similar to the also popular hand gesture shaka sign. The word became part of the lyrics for the group's 2024 single "Salamin, Salamin".

Sheena portrayed herself in a dramatization of her life story in the anthology series Maalaala Mo Kaya (transl. Would You Remember?). Angelica Panganiban was cast as her mother. It was the second episode of the program's revival as a limited series and premiered on May 1, 2025, on iWantTFC. Sheena underwent a two-day acting workshop with actress and acting coach Malou de Guzman in preparation for the role, which marked her first acting project.

== Filmography ==
=== Television ===
Year	Title	Role	Notes	Ref.
2018–2019	Pinoy Big Brother: Otso	Housemate	Reality show	
2023	It's Showtime	Herself	Performer	
2025	Maalaala Mo Kaya	Herself	Biopic, Season 31 (Episode: Camera)	

== Awards and nominations ==
Award	Year	Category	Nominee(s)	Result	Ref.
P-pop Music Awards	2023	Top Female Dancer of the Year	Sheena	Won	
P-pop Music Awards	2025	P-pop Favorite Dancer of the Year	Sheena	Nominated	
P-pop Music Awards	2026	Dancer of the Year	Sheena	Won	
VP Choice Awards	2025	Viral TikTok Video of the Year	"Eyyy" by Sheena Catacutan	Nominated	
VP Choice Awards	2026	Viral TikTok Video of the Year	"Shagidi" by Sheena Catacutan	Nominated	

== Listicles ==
Name of publisher, year listed, name of listicle, and placement
Publisher	Year	Listicle	Placement	Ref.
Billboard Philippines	2025	8 Iconic Musicians Who Came from 'Pinoy Big Brother'	Placed	
