= An Inconvenient Love =

2022 Filipino romantic comedy film

- Official movie poster
- Directed by: Petersen Vargas
- Screenplay by: Joaquin Enrico Santos; Daisy Cayanan
- Story by: Joaquin Enrico Santos
- Produced by: Carlo L. Katigbak; Kris Gazmen; Catsi Catalan; Daisy Cayanan; Kara U. Kintanar; Carmi Raymundo; Marizel Samson-Martinez
- Starring: Belle Mariano; Donny Pangilinan
- Cinematography: Noel Teehankee
- Edited by: Mai Calapardo; Benjamin Gonzales Tolentino
- Music by: Teresa Barrozo
- Production company: ABS-CBN Film Productions
- Distributed by: Star Cinema
- Release date: November 23, 2022
- Running time: 124 minutes
- Country: Philippines
- Language: Filipino
- Box office: $274,431 (₱15 million)

An Inconvenient Love (with a working title as Open 24Ever) is a 2022 Philippine romantic comedy film starring Belle Mariano and Donny Pangilinan, directed by Petersen Vargas and produced by Star Cinema. The film was released on November 23, 2022, in 175 cinemas in the Philippines.

== Plot ==
Manny, a company heir working undercover as a trade union activist, pretends to be in a relationship with Ayef, a passerby, to hide from police hunting for participants during a rally against his father Wilfredo's company. Caught in a rainstorm, Manny lends his umbrella to Ayef, who is heading to the 24-Ever convenience store, before parting ways. Ayef is then shown to be working part-time at 24-Ever to support her ambition to become a professional animator in Singapore, while Manny seeks to prove himself to Wilfredo, who disapproves of Manny's plant boutique shop business. Manny and Ayef track each other down on social media and discover that their workplaces are located near each other. Manny becomes a frequent customer at 24-Ever and slowly gains Ayef's heart, while Ayef learns more about Manny's family from him and becomes friends with his autistic half-brother Dobs.

After Ayef discovers that her domineering mother Terry has been deliberately sabotaging her internship application in Singapore to force her to stay in the Philippines, she goes for a ride with Manny to 24-Ever. After both release their frustrations about their respective families and their happiness with each other, Ayef and Manny agree to be in a romantic albeit conditional relationship for 100 days, subject to whether it is convenient for them to continue. Over the succeeding weeks, Ayef and Manny enjoy being a couple, despite Manny being found out by his father as a labor activist, while Ayef passes her internship interview for Singapore. Falling drunk at a date, both express that they have fallen in love with each other.

Manny invites Ayef to his house for a birthday dinner with his family. However, Wilfredo is incensed when Ayef inadvertently reveals that she met Manny at the rally, while things escalate when Manny's estranged mother Meryl arrives and chastises Wilfredo for his infidelity with Dobs' mother Agnes, who is also Manny's stepmother. As Manny's parents storm off, Wilfredo angrily demands that he close down his plant business and leave Ayef. Outside, Ayef asks for a break-up with Manny, citing his failure to stand up for her over the dinner, but Manny chastises her for loving him only in a less stressful time. Arriving at her home, Ayef encounters her father Filemon standing up to Terry and comforts him. The next day, Terry apologizes to Ayef for sabotaging her dreams and gives her blessing to pursue the internship in Singapore. Manny sees Wilfredo abusing Dobs and decides to stand up to his father before moving out, accompanied by Agnes and Dobs.

On the end date of their supposed relationship, Dobs reminds Manny of Ayef's promise to join him in a drawing session, prompting Manny to seek Ayef one last time. Arriving at her residence, Manny is told by a surprised Terry that she is on her way to the airport for her flight to Singapore. Terry contacts Ayef and tells her of Manny's request. Ayef then runs off to meet Manny at a rally, during which the couple make their romance permanent as Manny wishes good luck to Ayef in her journey.

== Cast and characters ==
=== Main ===
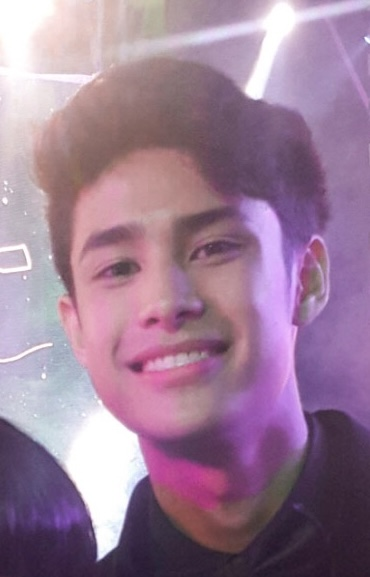
Donny Pangilinan portrays Manny

- Belle Mariano as Ayef—a graduating student and aspiring international animator who works part-time at a convenience store named 24-Ever.
- Donny Pangilinan as Manny—22-year-old owner of HalaManny, a boutique plant shop near 24-Ever.

=== Supporting ===
- JC Alcantara as Dobs—Manny's brother, who has autism spectrum disorder (ASD).
- Epy Quizon as Filemon—Ayef's dad
- Matet de Leon as Terry—Ayef's mom
- Adrian Lindayag as Jobert—Ayef's friend and co-worker.
- Iana Bernardez as Kookie—Ayef's friend and co-worker.
- Sheenly Gener as Fetussa—Ayef's friend and co-worker.
- Chino Liu as Ben 1—Manny's plant shop helper.
- Brian Sy as Ben 2—Manny's plant shop helper.
- Teresa Loyzaga as Meryl—Manny's mother
- Lara Quigaman as Agnes—Manny's stepmom
- Maxene Magalona as Viviana—Manny's sister
- Tirso Cruz III as Wilfredo Siena—Manny's dad and the owner of the Siena Corp.
- Nicco Manalo as a policeman
- Dwein Baltazar as Ayef's professor
- Nor Domingo as a labor activist
- Jomari Angeles as a labor activist
- Clara del Rosario as interviewer
- Aldo Ramzjoo as corman

== Production ==
=== Development ===
An Inconvenient Love marked the return of Star Cinema in the big screen and was the 30th Anniversary offering of the film outfit. The film was first announced in the finale of the He's Into Her (HIH) All Access Grand Concert on August 27, 2022, at the Smart Araneta Coliseum. On September 14, Star Cinema revealed in their social media accounts about the filming status of the movie saying "Keep your eyes peeled for the full cast reveal coming your way very soon". On September 29, the full cast of the movie was officially announced.

According to Cayanan in an interview with the Philippine Star, "An Inconvenient Love" was written taking reference with DonBelle and what Gen Z's way of expressing love at the present time; with the realization, especially after the pandemic, that life runs fast and people were too busy with their lives. On a separate interview, Donny shared with Metro Style about playing the character of "Manny", as the most challenging role so far in his entire acting career; while commending the superb characterization of Belle as "Ayef".

On a 32-minute Star Cinema special documentary—Donny and Belle:Their Moment—released on November 30, 2022, Donny expressed his hopes about the viewers' take-away on their film, saying they hope "we're able to move people...and importantly, people are going to fall in love again with Filipino-made movies".

=== Director ===
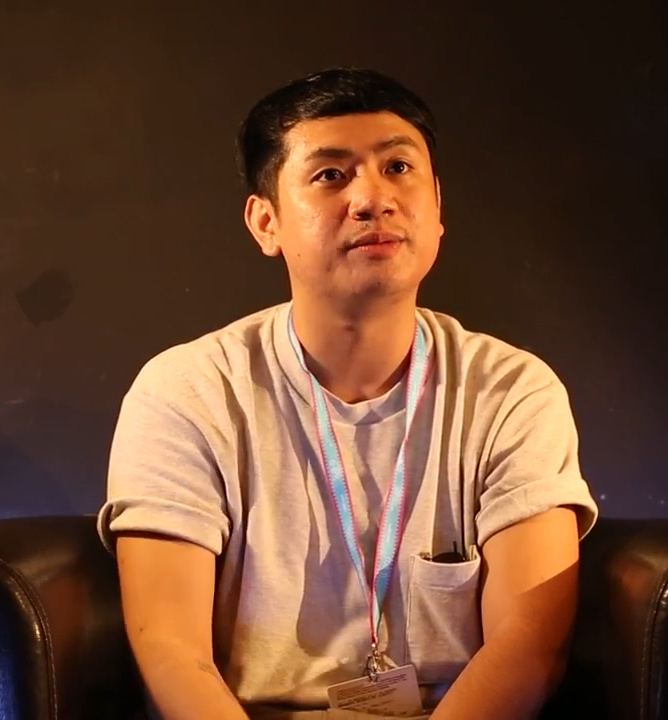
Director Petersen Vargas

I wanted to create characters that felt like real young people with real-world dreams and struggles.

I requested a lot of preparations and did specific workshops for their respective characters. We even immersed in an actual convenience store along Tomas Morato.... The characters their audiences will see are not just a result of my direction. It's one thing to follow my instructions, but they also have their vision and that's what made the experience better.

— Petersen Vargas, on directing An Inconvenient Love.

The film was the debut project of Petersen Vargas on Star Cinema. The project was handed to him as a full story line with Donny and Belle as its leads.

=== Music ===
An Inconvenient Love (Original Soundtrack)

Soundtrack album by Zack Tabudlo, Moira Dela Torre, BINI and BGYO
- Released: November 25, 2022
- Recorded: 2022
- Studio: EP
- Genres: OPM, Soundtrack
- Length: 21:32
- Language: Filipino
- Label: Star Music
- Producer: Jonathan Manalo

On November 15, 2022 Star Cinema has revealed the official soundtrack of the film and was officially released on November 25, 2022. In an Instagram post by Zack Tabudlo, it was revealed that the music video of "Pinadama" will feature the lead stars of the movie, Donny and Belle, and was released on December 4, 2022.

An Inconvenient Love (Original Soundtrack)
| No. | Title | Writer(s) | Artist | Length |
|---|---|---|---|---|
| 1. | "Pinadama" | Zack Tabudlo | Zack Tabudlo | 3:56 |
| 2. | "Aking Habang Buhay" | Moira Dela Torre | Moira Dela Torre | 4:14 |
| 3. | "Huwag Muna Tayong Umuwi" | Gianina Camille Del Rosario Julius James "Jumbo" De Belen | BINI | 4:58 |
| 4. | "Tumitigil Ang Mundo" | Frederico Miguel Claveria (Hiphop Uncles) of Flipmusic Marcial Domingo Antonio (Hiphop Uncles) of Flipmusic Julius James "Jumbo" De Belen of FlipMusic | BGYO | 4:08 |
| 5. | "Lagi" | Louie Martin Canaria | BINI | 4:16 |
| Total length: | | | | 21:32 |

== Marketing ==
On October 21, 2022, the official teaser trailer was released, with over one million views within the first five hours of its release, and the official poster three days after. As a result, the film became a trending topic on Twitter in the Philippines. On October 28, the full trailer of the movie was revealed at the Grand Media Launch event. On November 12, the second trailer was released, featuring a confrontational scene from the lead characters. As part of the movie promotion, the lead casts Donny Pangilinan and Belle Mariano embarked on a provincial tours in the Philippines and overseas, named 24Ever Tour, which also includes their guest appearance on the US news outlet NBC Palm Springs and in the ABS-CBN variety show It's Showtime (November 29).

== Release ==
=== Theatrical Run ===
An Inconvenient Love premiered on November 22, 2022 at the SM Megamall in Mandaluyong, ahead on its scheduled regular screenings on November 23.

| Release date | Country | Format | Ref. |
|---|---|---|---|
| November 22, 2022 | Premiere Night (Red Carpet) (Note: "Attended by the ABS-CBN executives, the casts and the creative team of An Inconvenient Love.") | Movie Theater | |
| November 23, 2022 | Philippines, (Note: "In the Philippines, the film was shown in 175 cinemas.") Guam, Australia, New Zealand | Movie Theater | |
| November 24, 2022 | Brunei, Bahrain, Kuwait, Oman, Qatar, Saudi Arabia, UAE | Movie Theater | |
| November 25, 2022 | USA, Canada, Malaysia, Singapore, Nigeria | Movie Theater | |
| November 26, 2022 | United Kingdom | Movie Theater | |
| November 27, 2022 | Austria, Spain | Movie Theater | |
| December 3, 2022 | Hong Kong | Movie Theater | |
| December 30, 2022 | Cambodia (Note: "In Cambodia, the film was dubbed in Khmer.") | Movie Theater | |

=== Streaming ===
The film premiered on Netflix in February 2023.

== Reception ==
=== Box office performance ===
The film grossed ₱15 million in ticket sales as of November 30, 2022 (₱4 million came from its first day).

=== Screening ===
==== Domestic ====
In the Philippines, the number of the movie screenings was increased from 160 to 175 cinemas.

==== International ====
An Inconvenient Love was shown in 20 countries from November to December 2022, with regular screenings scheduled in Guam, Hong Kong, Singapore, Malaysia, Nigeria, and Cambodia. On November 16, 2022, the Dubai special screenings of An Inconvenient Love scheduled on December 4, 2022, were announced as sold out.

=== Critical response ===
Jason Tan Liwag of CNN Philippines expressed in an article saying "An Inconvenient Love captures the social isolation and the need for independence that seems characteristic of coming-of-age narratives post-pandemic...writers Cayanan and Santos situate the young love squarely under the guillotine of socioeconomic and sociopolitical turmoil...[and] with how disingenuous the family drama devolves into and how it tosses discussions of abuse to the side". Nazamel Tabares of Pelikula Mania praised the cinematography of the film saying "this is one of the most good-looking films of Star Cinema in terms of cinematography" and emphasized the effectivity of DonBelle's portrayals with the characters saying "more than the romance, An Inconvenient Love is a coming-of-age story...and it works because of how good Donny and Belle has become as actors". Rafael Bautista of Nylon Manila described the film as a convenient watch saying "the rom-com vibes are there,..but it also cuts surprisingly deep with its story of love and young adulthood in today's world, DonBelle's acting continues to impress with a chemistry that lights up the silver screen". Ryan Oquiza of Rappler shared in an article that the film restores faith in the love team genre emphasizing "[the] An Inconvenient Love has a lot of things going on in the background and sometimes, urgent issues [of the society]...but, focuses on romance. Vargas ingeniously finds a way to have the lovers come to a compromise and to forward the notion that love can overcome obstacles and transform people". Avram Francisco of This is Hype praised the script, the film's visuals and DonBelle's chemistry.

=== Awards and nominations ===
| Year | Award | Category | Nominee(s) | Result | Ref. |
|---|---|---|---|---|---|
| 2023 | ContentAsia Awards | Best Asian Feature Film | An Inconvenient Love | Won | |

== See also ==
- List of films produced and released by Star Cinema
- List of Philippine films of 2022
- List of highest-grossing Philippine films
