= Bini (group) =

Filipino girl group

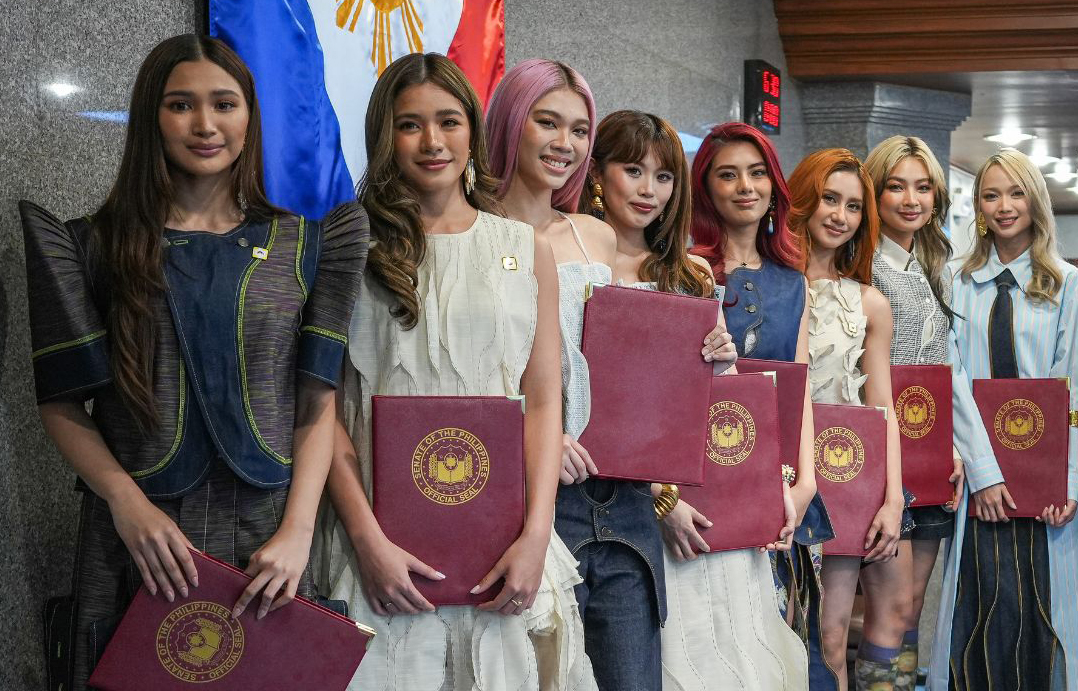
- Bini at the Senate of the Philippines in May 2026; L–R: Jhoanna, Aiah, Stacey, Maloi, Mikha, Sheena, Colet, and Gwen

Background information
- Origin: Manila, Philippines
- Genres: P-pop; bubblegum pop; EDM; funk; hip-hop; pop rock; R&B; teen pop
- Works: Discography; videography; live performances
- Years active: 2020–present
- Label: Star
- Awards: Full List
- Members: Aiah; Colet; Maloi; Gwen; Stacey; Mikha; Jhoanna; Sheena
- Website: bini.global

Bini (stylized in all caps) is a Filipino girl group formed in 2019 through ABS-CBN's televised idol training program Star Hunt Academy, where they spent three years in preparation for their debut. The group is composed of eight members: Aiah, Colet, Maloi, Gwen, Stacey, Mikha, Jhoanna, and Sheena. They are currently signed with Star Music and Star Magic. Since their inception, they have been referred to as the "Nation's Girl Group" due to their impact on the public and Philippine pop music. Bini became the Filipino pop group with the most monthly listeners on Spotify and the first to top Billboard's Philippine Songs chart. Their music is widely associated with bubblegum pop, though they have incorporated a broad range of other genres as well, according to critics.

Before their official debut on June 11, 2021, the group released a pop cover of Ryan Cayabyab's song "Da Coconut Nut" on November 20, 2020. In 2021, Bini released their debut studio album Born to Win, which contained a title track of the same name and the promotional single "Kapit Lang" (transl. Just Hold On), as its two singles.

In 2023, Bini issued the singles "Karera" and "Pantropiko", the latter of which went viral on TikTok through the "Pantropiko Dance Challenge" and was regarded as a summer anthem in the Philippines. A year later, they released their first EP, Talaarawan (2024), which topped the Billboard Philippine Songs chart. On June 9, 2024, Bini entered the Top Artist Global Chart on Spotify, making them the first Filipino artist to achieve the record. In November 2024, they became the first Filipino act to win the "Best Asia Act" prize at the MTV Europe Music Awards.

In 2025, they surpassed one billion all-time streams on Spotify. They received the Billboard Philippines Women in Music "Rising Star" Award. In the same year, they were named Women of the Year. They were also recognized as the number-one Philippine act by Billboard Philippines, representing their country in the magazine's inaugural Global No.1 series. In May, Bini was included in Forbes Asia's 30 Under 30 list under the "Sports and Entertainment" category. On September 16, Coachella announced Bini as a part of the 2026 lineup, making them the first Filipino group to perform at the festival. They made their debut at the event on April 10, 2026. In November, their song "Unang Kilig" (lit. 'First Kilig') was nominated for Best Asian Pop Music Performance at the upcoming 69th Annual Grammy Awards.

== History ==
=== Name ===
Official band logo

The group's name derives from the Tagalog word BiniBini, meaning "young lady". It is intended to represent modern Filipino women, who are said to be a mix of different qualities such as "sweet", "confident", "independent", and "informed".

=== 2018–2020: Formation, pre-debut activities ===
Laurenti Dyogi, the head of entertainment production of ABS-CBN, proposed establishing a training camp for young performers to develop their skills. In 2018, ABS-CBN launched Star Hunt Academy (SHA), which had 250 people auditioning between the ages of 16 and 19 years from all over the Philippines. From this pool, with recommendations from talent scouts, the first set of 12 female Star Hunt Academy Girls trainees was selected. While Dyogi initially planned to debut a nine-member idol girl group, it was eventually trimmed down to eight: Aiah Arceta, Colet Vergara, Maloi Ricalde, Stacey Sevilleja, Mikha Lim, Jhoanna Robles, Gwen Apuli, and Sheena Catacutan.

The group trained from 2019 to 2020 under local coaches, which included Kitchy Molina, a former chair of the Department of Voice, Music Theater, and Dance at the University of the Philippines College of Music; the Austrian-born dance coach Mickey Perz; and South Korean coaches from MU Doctor Academy. On August 3, 2019, the group debuted as SHA trainees during Pinoy Big Brother: Otso's Celebr8 at the Big Night online pre-show. They performed at their first mall show in Taguig on August 15. Later that year, they appeared at a National Youth Commission event, where they were named youth ambassadors. They also participated in the 2019 Manila Southeast Asian Games thanksgiving celebration. For Bini's pre-debut single, South Korea's MU Doctor Academy and the music production group Vo3e collaborated to transform Ryan Cayabyab's novelty song "Da Coconut Nut" into an electropop remake. In addition, choreographers Moon Yeon-joo and Kwak Seong-chan, who had previously worked with K-pop groups, were brought in to create a dance routine. Bini's version of "Da Coconut Nut" was released in November. On December 4, 2020, Bini signed a contract with Star Magic and Star Music.

=== 2021–2022: Debut, growing recognition ===
Bini released multiple teasers leading to their debut, with the first one coming out on May 4, 2021, through a QR code leading to an image that read "Are you ready for the Biniverse?" The same month, their music label, Star Music, announced the group's premiere with the single "Born to Win", which was released on June 4. On September 10, Bini released their third single, "Kapit Lang" (transl. Just Hold On), a pop track featuring "bright" synths, trap percussion, and "thick [...] rumbles" of bass. On September 30, at the Miss Universe Philippines 2021 pageant, they performed "Born to Win", which was used as the official song for the pageant's preliminary swimsuit and evening gown competitions.

On April 29, 2022, Bini released the electropop single "Pit A Pat". Although the song reportedly garnered mixed responses from fans, critical reception was generally positive. Tara Aquino of Rolling Stone praised the song's "attitude" and lyrics about self-empowerment and ambition. Hans Carbonilla of the Inquirer's US Bureau called the track "lively" and a summer playlist staple.

On June 27, Bini released the single "Lagi" (lit. 'Always'), a bubblegum pop and pop rock song. The song received acclaim from critics, especially for the Bini members' vocal performances. (Note: Attributed to multiple sources:) Jelou Galang of the Philippine Daily Inquirer (US Bureau) said that the song effectively conveys the "strange" and "complex" feelings that come with falling in love. In two separate interviews from 2023 and 2024, Bini members Mikha and Gwen identified the success of "Lagi" as Bini's breakthrough moment.

Two other singles, "I Feel Good" and "Strings", came out ahead of their second album. The bubblegum track "I Feel Good" was released on September 22. Nylon Manila's Rafael Bautista called the song "insanely catchy" and "maybe some of Bini's finest work to date". The next single, "Strings", came out alongside Bini's second studio album Feel Good on September 29. "Strings" is a blend of hip-hop and swing music, featuring a nonlinear structure and a marching band. The track garnered acclaim for going beyond bubblegum pop. The Inquirer's Hannah Mallorca called it a "drastic shift in tone and tempo" for Bini, praising Colet, Maloi, and Jhoanna's "powerful" belts in particular. Likewise, Billboard Philippines' Mayks Go described the track as "much darker-sounding" than Bini's other songs, showcasing their range as musicians.

Feel Good contained five original songs, including "Lagi", "I Feel Good", and "Strings". The other tracks were "No Fear", a dance-pop track with a beat drop and "Huwag Muna Tayong Umuwi" (transl. Let's Not Go Home Yet), a power ballad about wanting another person to stay with you. Two bonus tracks, an acoustic version of "Lagi" and a dance version of "Strings", were included as well. Bautista of Nylon wrote that the album showed the group's versatility. In 2026, a retrospective article by Rolling Stone Philippines described "No Fear" in particular as an example of Bini in their less sophisticated early stages. Although he criticized its EDM beat drop as outdated and almost "laughable", writer Elijah Pareño considered the song "a first step nonetheless" towards developing a sound for the group.

=== 2023–2024: Domestic success, "Pantropiko" virality, and Talaarawan ===
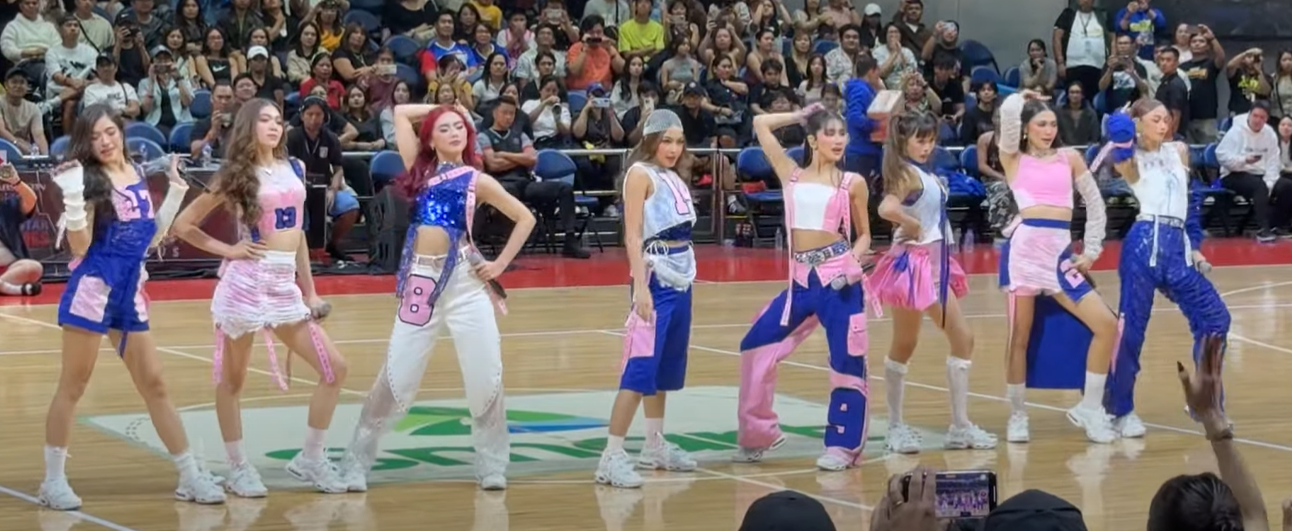
Bini performing "Karera" at the Star Magic All-Star Games 2024

In 2023, copies of the Bini singles "Kapit Lang" and "Golden Arrow" were sent to the Moon as part of the Lunar Codex archive by National Aeronautics and Space Administration (NASA). Later that year, the group released the singles "Karera" (lit. 'Race') and "Pantropiko" (lit. 'Tropical').

"Karera" has been described as a disco-influenced dance-pop song about mental health. One of its lyricists, Nica Del Rosario, is clinically diagnosed with generalized anxiety disorder and wrote the song based on her experiences with the condition. The track earned positive reviews from music journalists. Preen's Andrea Posadas praised the song's meaningful themes and "meticulous" execution; Billboard Philippines' Kara Angan lauded the "killer" melody and hook, hailing the track as one of 2023's best P-pop releases.

Meanwhile, "Pantropiko" is a tropical house track with Latin and Caribbean influences. Critical reception for "Pantropiko" was more mixed. Mayks Go of Billboard Philippines considered the song to be "catchy" and "memorable"; Preen's Eric Nicole Salta complimented its "twinkling" synths, vocals, and hints of reggae. Conversely, Julienne Loreto and Maddie Armstrong of &Asian considered the song to be "generic" and musically uninteresting, albeit "competently made" and "enjoyable", especially live. The Flying Lugaw's Louis Pelingen said that the song's synthetic textures "completely blemish" its summery tone and its vocal mixing is too loud.

Bini gained further recognition after "Pantropiko" went viral on TikTok, being regarded as a summer anthem in the Philippines. Its trend led to the "Pantropiko Dance Challenge", which involved millions of participants. In January 2024, the group's monthly listeners on Spotify surpassed 200,000 for the first time, following the viral success of "Pantropiko". In July, "Pantropiko" reached 100 million streams on Spotify and YouTube Music.

Coinciding with International Women's Day on March 8, 2024, Bini released the EP Talaarawan (lit. 'Diary'), which consisted of six songs, including "Karera" and "Pantropiko". Lugaw's Pelingen gave the record a mixed review. He commended the Bini members' performances in the EP and its "well-composed" melodies. However, he found the lyricism to be uninspired and criticized the production, naming "glaring" issues such as inconsistent mixing. He believed that the Bini members were "stuck" in the same sound with only slight or few variations across their albums so far. The B-side "Diyan Ka Lang" (transl. Just Stay There), a bubblegum and electropop love song incorporating retro drums, keyboard, and chiptunes, was identified by multiple critics as a standout track on the EP due to its vocal performances and production. (Note: Attributed to multiple sources:)

Its lead single, "Salamin, Salamin", became one of two songs by the group, alongside "Pantropiko", to top Billboard's Philippines Songs chart. By late March, Bini had over two million monthly listeners on Spotify, making them the highest-streamed female OPM artist and the most-streamed P-pop group on the platform. Bini, along with fellow P-pop girl group G22, appeared on the Chinese reality show Show It All, hosted by Lay Zhang, performing "Karera", "I Feel Good", and "Pantropiko" in episodes that aired on April 25 and May 2.

In June, Bini entered the Top Artists Global chart on Spotify, reaching 193rd place. On June 10, the group launched their website and announced plans to release a new single, titled "Cherry on Top". On June 11, they held their inaugural "National Happy Bini Day" at One Ayala in Makati to commemorate their third anniversary. On June 12, during the 126th anniversary of Philippine independence, Bini performed at festivities organized by the Philippine government at the Quirino Grandstand. Their performance was cut short due to safety concerns arising from unruly crowds, which resulted in medical emergencies for some attendees.

=== 2024–2025: Biniverse, new releases ===
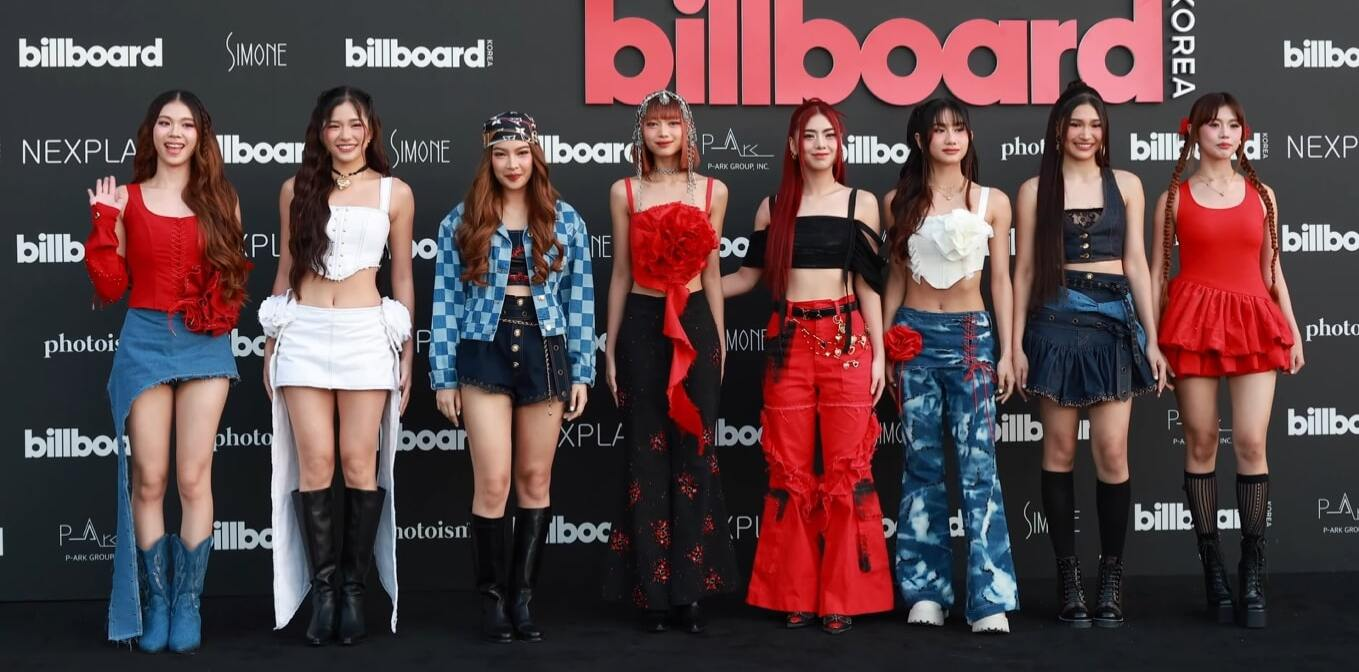
Bini at Billboard Korea's K Power 100 event in 2024

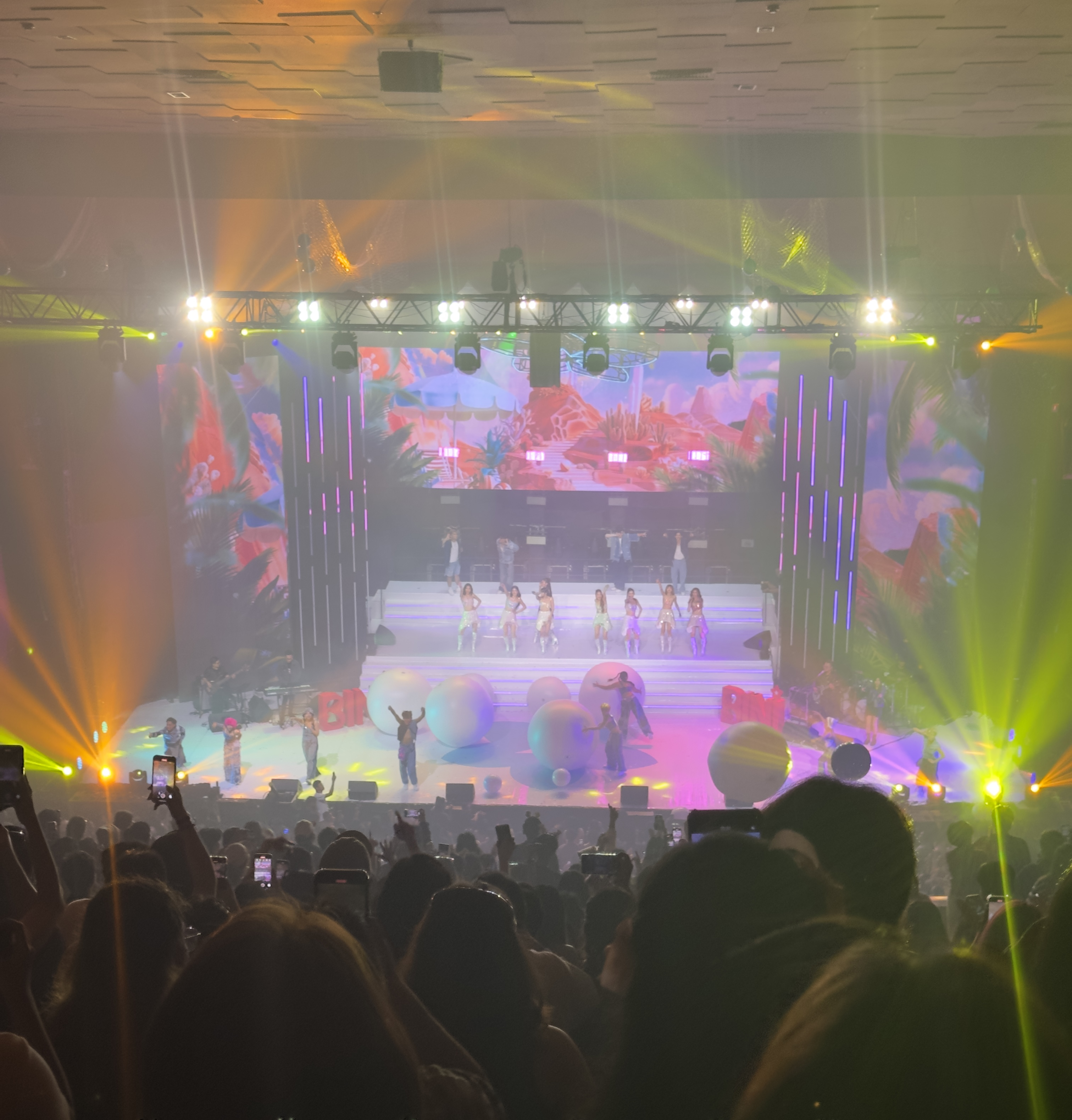
Bini performing "Pantropiko" at New Frontier Theater in Quezon City in 2024

On June 28, 2024, Bini began their first tour, titled Biniverse, with a three-day concert at the New Frontier Theater in Quezon City. It was followed by stops in Baguio, Cebu City, and General Santos in July, and an overseas leg in Canada in August. In November, the group held another three-day show, titled the Grand Biniverse, at the Araneta Coliseum in Quezon City. Bini became the first Filipino girl group to hold three consecutive sold-out shows at the New Frontier Theater as well as the Araneta Coliseum. They were also featured in a three-part documentary series on the Biniverse tour by iWantTFC, titled Bini Chapter 1: Born To Win, Bini Chapter 2: Here with You, and Bini Chapter 3: Hanggang Dulo.

In July, ABS-CBN Music announced that work was underway on Bini's fourth album, and that another album was slated to be released for foreign audiences. On July 11, the group released "Cherry on Top", a UK garage song with "flirtatious" lyrics. In the Philippine Daily Inquirer's Pop! section, Geiron Jeff Ocampo observed that the song marked a shift in Bini's musical style. He believed the song was potentially a "mistake" that could alienate the group's listeners. On the other hand, Teen Vogue included "Cherry on Top" in their "Best Songs of July 2024" list, with writers Sara Delgado and Kaitlyn McNab deeming it a "summer banger". The track topped the Top Songs chart on iTunes Philippines and Billboard Philippines and became the number-one trending song on YouTube immediately after its release.

The group, sans Jhoanna, who was ill, also performed at the pre-show of the KCON 2024 music festival in Los Angeles on July 27, making them the first Pinoy pop group to do so at the event. The same month, Billboard Philippines reported that almost all of the songs in the Top Five of their Top Philippine Songs chart were by Bini, except for "Dilaw" (lit. 'Yellow') by Maki. A total of six Bini songs were on the chart, including the 2022 releases "Na Na Na", "Huwag Muna Tayong Umuwi", and "Lagi". Later in the month, the magazine reported a total of seven of the group's songs on the same chart.

On August 27, Bini, along with boy band SB19, received the Voices of Asia Award in Billboard Korea's K Power 100 launch event in Seoul, South Korea. The award recognized their contributions to Filipino music and their promotion of P-pop on the global stage. On November 10, Bini became the first Filipino performers to win the Best Asia Act at the MTV Europe Music Awards, held in the United Kingdom. On November 27, "Salamin, Salamin" was listed in Apple Music's Best Songs of 2024 in the Philippines.

In December, "Salamin, Salamin" and "Cherry on Top" were recognized as the top one and top two music videos of 2024 on YouTube in the Philippines, respectively. Bini were also recognized by Spotify as the Top Groups and Top Local Groups, as well as its second Top Local Artist in the Philippines for 2024, while "Pantropiko" landed at fifth place in its Top Songs list. Google also recognized Bini as its most-searched female personality in the Philippines in 2024, with member Mikha also placing tenth in the list. Billboard Philippines also recognized Bini as the Philippines' number-one artist for the magazine's inaugural Global No. 1 series in 2024.

On February 4, 2025, Bini renewed their contracts with Star Magic and Star Music. On February 13, the group released the new single "Blink Twice", an R&B-pop track. According to Gabriel Saulog, the song explored a new sound for the group. Critical reception was mixed. Nylon Manila's Nica Glorioso appreciated the song's women empowerment themes, while &Asian's Loreto and Armstrong believed its "monotonous" production did not match the lyrics.

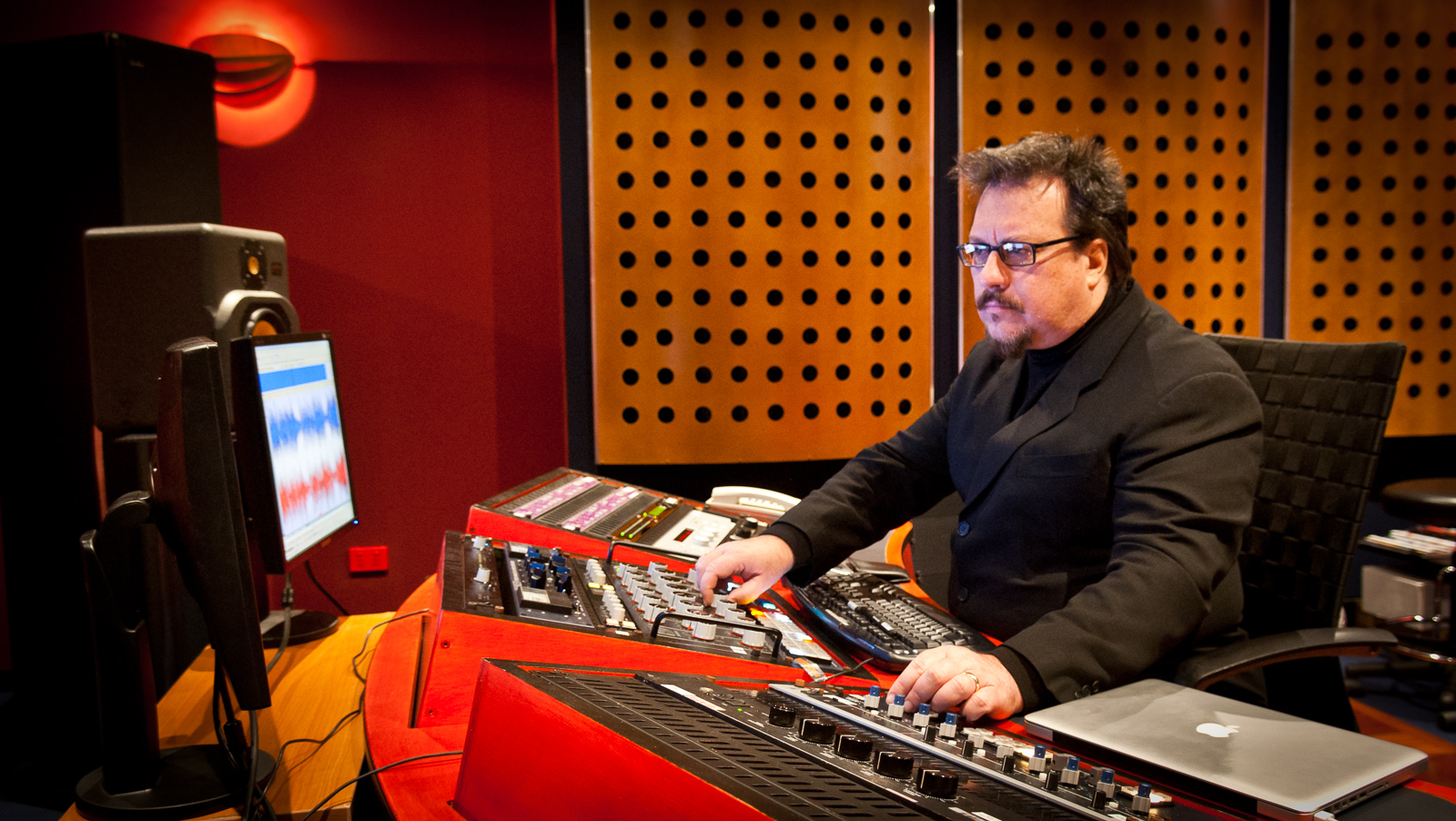
Leon Zervos mastered all of the tracks on Biniverse.

On February 15, Bini held a concert titled Grand Biniverse: The Valentine Repeat at the Philippine Arena in Bocaue, Bulacan. The first leg of their inaugural world tour, The Valentine Repeat made Bini the first Philippine act to headline a concert at the venue, and they subsequently became the first local act to hold a sold-out concert at the venue, which has a capacity of 55,000 seats. At the end of the show, the group announced that an upcoming EP, titled Biniverse, would be released on February 27.

Biniverse was the group's first all-English record. It included a collaboration with former Day6 member Jae Park as well as the singles "Cherry on Top" and "Blink Twice". The EP reportedly received backlash due to the lack of Tagalog lyrics as well as its "global" sound aimed at foreign listeners. However, retrospective articles released in 2026 defended Biniverse. Writing for Positively Filipino, Julienne Loreto opined that the backlash against Biniverse had been "deeply misguided". Likewise, Esquire Philippines' John Patrick "Joker" Manio called the EP "a really, really competent record", concluding that "in hindsight, [Biniverse] rose up to the challenge".

Bini appeared on the Recording Academy's New Music Friday list, becoming the only Filipino act included in that lineup. The Biniverse World Tour 2025 continued with stops in Dubai, London, Canada, and the United States, until June. On February 17, the Aurora Music Festival announced that the group would headline both days of the event's 2025 iteration, which was held on May 3 and 4 in Clark, Pampanga. They also headlined the Davao edition of the event, on October 25, alongside Filipino singers Amiel Sol and Rob Deniel. At the inauguration of The Official Philippines Chart on February 19, Bini were recognized as its top local artist of the year, while "Salamin, Salamin" and "Pantropiko" were named top four and five local songs of the year, respectively.

On March 20, Bini reached one billion all-time streams on Spotify. That same month, the group was named as the Women of the Year of Billboard Philippines Women in Music.

In May, Sheena made her acting debut, playing herself in a biographical episode of the drama anthology series Maalaala Mo Kaya (transl. Would You Remember). The rest of Bini also appeared in the episode. On May 8, Bini issued a public apology on social media following the circulation of a video showing members Jhoanna, Colet, and Stacey making comments in response to sexual jokes by dancer and content creator Shawn Castro and GAT member Ethan David. In a statement, the band said that they had "made a mistake", expressed regret, and promised to learn from the controversy. David and Castro also apologized and took full responsibility for the incident.

On May 14, Bini were included in Forbes Asia's annual 30 Under 30 roster, under "Sports and Entertainment". According to the magazine, they are the only girl group in the 2025 list. A few days later, the group released a video for their song "Zero Pressure", which had come out at the end of February. On May 17, after arriving in Dubai for the first stop on the Biniverse World Tour, they received a certificate of commendation from the Philippine Consulate General, in recognition of their contributions to "Filipino culture and pride on the global stage". The next day, they performed at the Coca-Cola Arena for their Dubai concert, with more than 10,000 people in attendance.

During the US leg of their tour, Bini were guests at New York's Philippine Independence Day parade and performed at the holiday's celebration in Madison Avenue.

On June 5, they released a special tour single titled "Shagidi", a dancehall and hip-hop song with staccato drum patterns and 808 bass. It is inspired by a Filipino children's chant game. At a press conference, Bini's Mikha acknowledged that the song would be divisive due to its "unconventional" sound and structure, but she and fellow member Aiah asserted the group's desire to explore new styles in their music. The song polarized critics; Rolling Stone Philippines' Pie Gonzaga praised its Afrobeats-influenced production as "rough in the best way, grimy and percussive", calling it an "exciting" expansion of Bini's sound. On the other hand, Esquire's Manio panned it as "offensive slop". On June 29, Bini hosted the "Here with You" homecoming fan meet at the SM Mall of Asia Arena in Pasay.

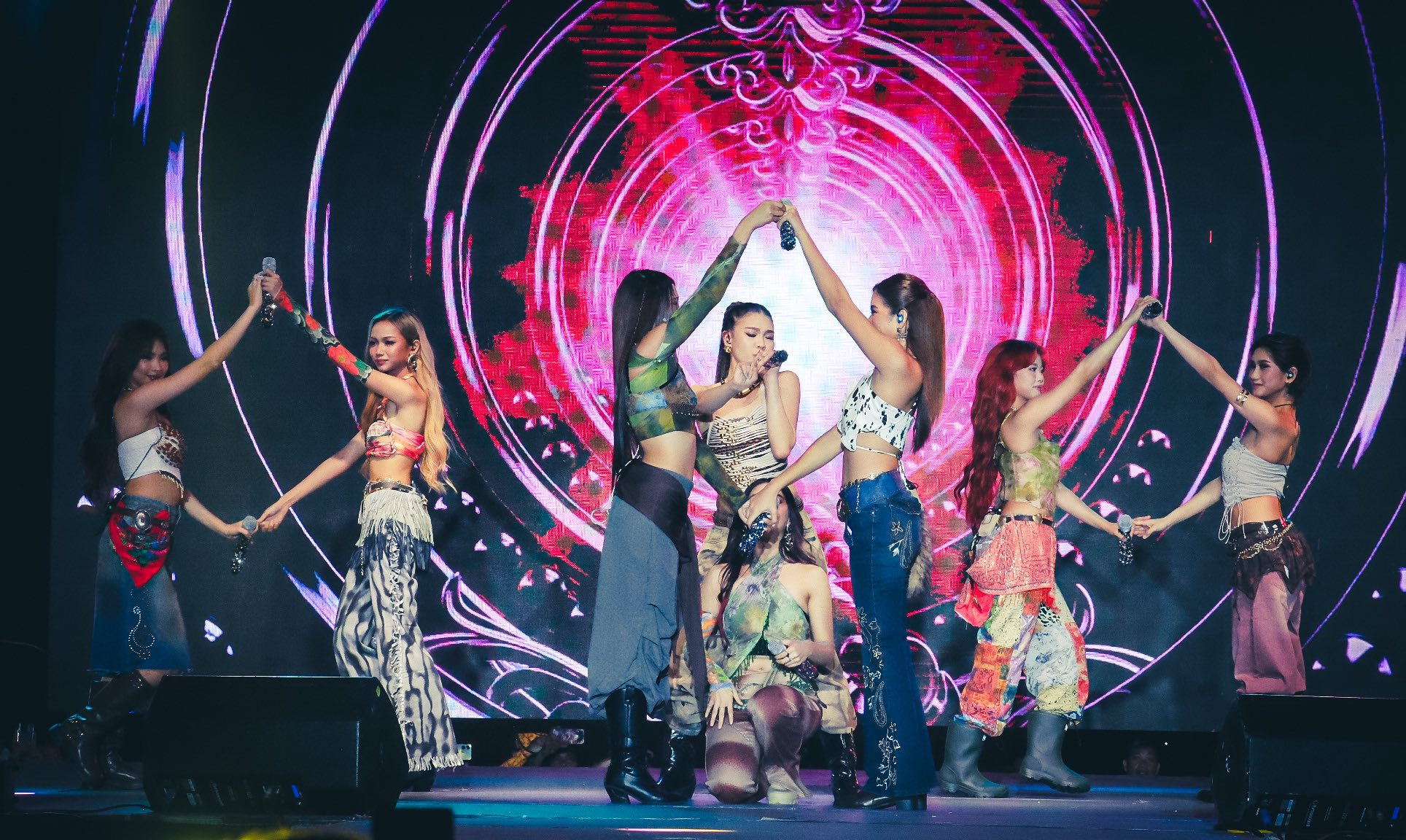
Bini performing "Salamin, Salamin" at the Ibalong Festival in September 2025

In August, Bini filed a legal complaint against an unnamed party with their lawyer Joji Alonso. They sought ₱8 million (US$162,436.55) in damages due to "extreme mental and emotional anguish" caused by an allegedly malicious edit of their People vs. Food guest appearance. On August 21, during a signing event titled Journey Through the Biniverse, the group announced Binified: A Year-End Concert, held for November 29 at the Philippine Arena in Bulacan. They also revealed plans to release a new album featuring English and Tagalog tracks, some of which would be performed at the concert.

Spotify recognized them as notable alumni of Spotify Radar, alongside the Filipino pop rock band Cup of Joe. The girl group announced the release of their documentary "Bini World Tour Series", which documents their experiences during international performances, including concert preparations, behind the scenes activities, and life on tour. On September 16, Coachella officially announced Bini as a part of their 2026 lineup, marking them as the first Filipino act to perform at the festival. The group performed on April 10 and 17, 2026. Laurenti Dyogi also said that they are working with the agency Wasserman.

On October 3, they teased their new single, titled "First Luv", a bubblegum and R&B track. The song uses a range of instruments, like a cowbell, 808 bass, and a church organ, creating what has been described as a "unique" and experimental sound. Gavin Martinez of the Inquirer (US Bureau) praised the song for "perfectly" capturing its romantic themes. "First Luv" entered Billboard Philippines' Hot 100 in the week of October 18, debuting at number 73; it was reportedly the only P-pop song on the chart in that period. On October 21, the group performed "First Luv" at the inaugural Filipino Music Awards at the SM Mall of Asia Arena. Rolling Stone Philippines and Billboard Philippines included Bini's stage in their lists of the night's best performances, with both magazines lauding Bini's live vocals and choreography.

On October 24, they announced their second album titled Flames. A component single, "Paruparo" (lit. 'Butterfly'), was released ahead of the album in November. It has been described variously as a bubblegum, soul, R&B, house, and EDM song. &Asian's Loreto reviewed its production negatively, calling its electronic riffs "outdated", specifically comparing its sound to The Chainsmokers' 2010s tracks.

Flames was released on November 20 alongside a music video for one of its tracks, "Sweet Tooth", an R&B song that uses sugar as a metaphor for desire. Critical reception towards the album as a whole was mixed. Some critics considered it to be among the best Filipino albums and EPs of 2025, while others deemed it the worst of Bini's career so far.

However, "Sweet Tooth" received critical acclaim. The writers of the Filipino music magazine Pulp praised its maturity, adding that Bini's Filipino roots are present in the song even though it is tailored for a global audience. Anjana Pawa of the American media organization JoySauce called the song "addictive". On December 19, Bini headlined the 2025 UST Paskuhan alongside Ben&Ben.

=== 2026–present: Signals release, Coachella debut performance ===
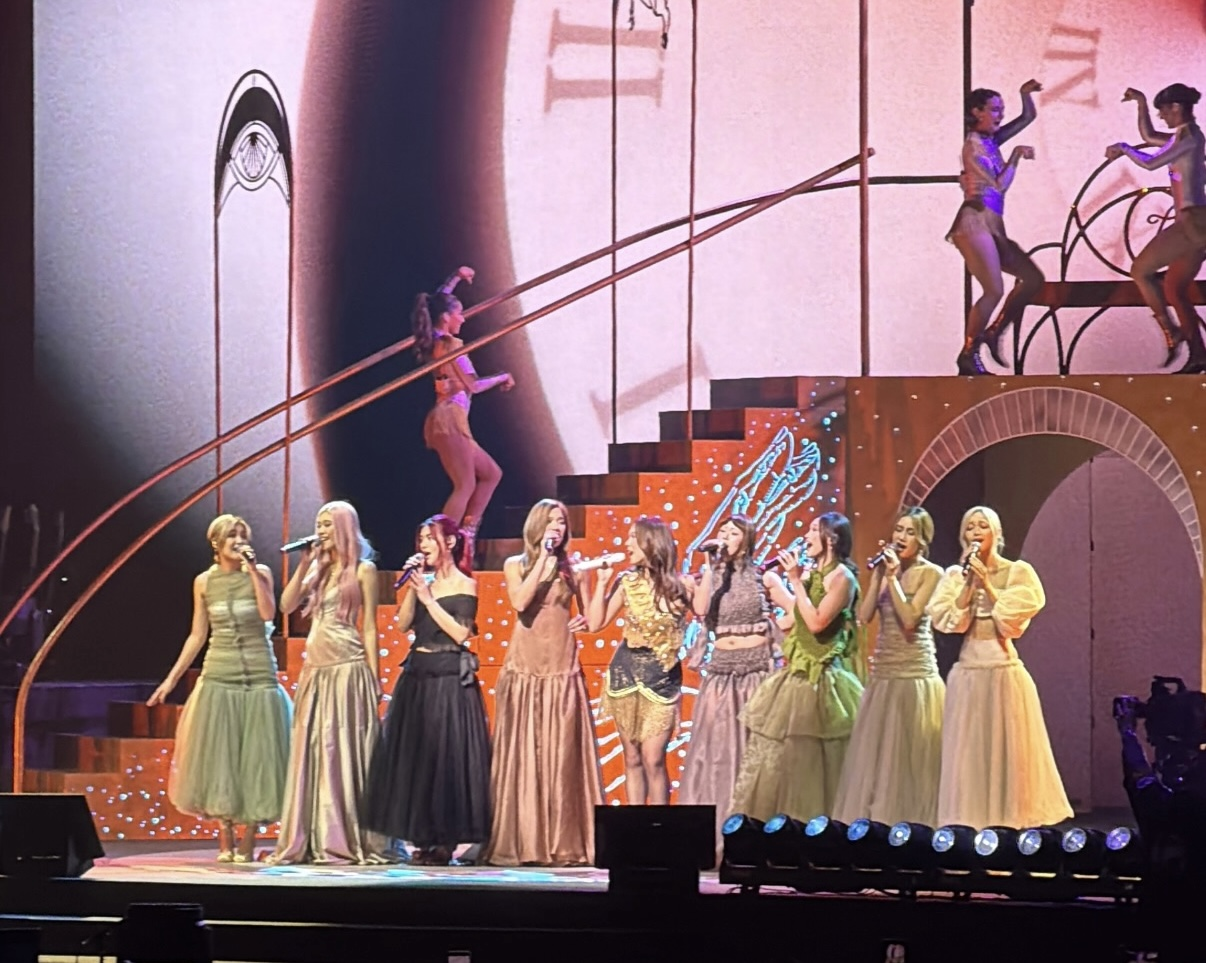
Bini with Laufey during the latter's concert at the SM Mall of Asia Arena in Pasay in May 2026

In February 2026, Bini was one of the surprise guest performers during SexBomb Girls' reunion concert, where the two groups performed together a short set that included "Halukay Ube", (transl. Ube Mash), "Salamin, Salamin," and "Pantropiko". In the same month, Bini hosted Valentine's Kiligan Festival and announced a new single titled "Unang Kilig" (transl. First Kilig). The song was released on March 5, alongside its B-side "Honey Honey", a surprise release. "Unang Kilig" is a city pop song, while "Honey Honey" has been described as UK garage with a breakbeat instrumental.

"Unang Kilig" was included in Rolling Stone Philippines' curated "Songs You Need to Know" list, with writer Elijah Pareño lauding the song's "clear" hook and emphasis on melody. Pulp's Ghilieah Valeska Tabbada also praised the vocal riffs, "angelic" harmonies, and international appeal of "Honey Honey".

On March 14, Bini was named Powerhouse of the Year by the Billboard Philippines Women in Music. On March 16, Bini officially joined the South Korean fan platform Weverse. Later than month, Bini also held a send-off event at Market! Market! in Taguig, drawing around 15,800 fans, and also announcing two concerts scheduled for June and July 2026, titled Signals, to be held at the SM Mall of Asia Arena and SM Arena Seaside Cebu. (Note: The June concerts would also coincide with Bini's fifth anniversary.) An EP with the same name was also announced.

Signals was released on April 9. The EP contained the previously released "Unang Kilig" and "Honey Honey", as well as new tracks that have been described as a mix of hip-hop, new jack swing, and R&B-pop. It garnered acclaim from music critics. Mega's Rafael Bautista hailed it as possibly Bini's most sonically cohesive album so far, while Julienne Loreto of Positively Filipino praised its "irresistible" melodies, declaring it the group's best since their Talaarawan EP in 2024.

On April 1, Bini served as the guests of honor during the Los Angeles Clippers' Filipino Heritage Night celebration game at the Intuit Dome, where each member was presented with a customized Clippers jersey. On April 10, Bini made their debut at Coachella, officially becoming the first Filipino act to perform at the festival. Their performance reached the number one worldwide trending spot on X shortly afterwards. Their set from the first weekend also garnered the second-highest number of views online, second only to headliner Justin Bieber.

On April 14, the Bini members hosted an episode of Apple Music Radio as guest DJs. They performed at Coachella for a second time on April 17, where they became the top trending topic on social media worldwide again. On April 21, Bini performed at the Global Spin Live event at the Grammy Museum in Los Angeles, making them the first Filipino act to perform at the venue. The tickets for the public sold out within one minute of release. They are set to perform at Summer Sonic 2026 in Japan on August 14 and 16.

On May 6, the Senate of the Philippines adopted Resolution No. 370, commending Bini for being the first Filipino act to perform at Coachella. The resolution was authored by Senator Bam Aquino. On May 18, the House of Representatives also adopted a similar measure, Resolution No. 1001, congratulating the group. On May 30, Bini performed at the last day of the Kaogma Festival in Camarines Sur, attracting over 153,000 attendees.

In June 2026, Bini was announced as one of the artists featured in the soundtrack of the upcoming DreamWorks Animation film Forgotten Island set to release later this year. The group premiered an exclusive snippet of their new song, titled "A Parallel World", and introduced the signature choreography, during the opening night of their Signals World Tour at the SM Mall of Asia Arena. On July 3, the Department of Tourism officially designated Bini as one of the Philippines' tourism ambassadors. On July 24, Bini made a special appearance at the Forgotten Island panel at San Diego Comic-Con, where they performed "A Parallel World".

Bini made their Summer Sonic debut on August 14, 2026 in Osaka. The group’s performances on the first and third days of the festival became the No. 1 and No. 3 trending topics on X worldwide, respectively. In the same month, Bini became the first Filipino act to perform on Amercian media company, Genius, as part of their Open Mic video series, where they performed "A Parallel World".

In October, it was announced that Bini would be included in the lineup for LaLaLa Fest Manila 2027 scheduled at the Philippine Arena and headlined by Olivia Dean. On October 8, Bini made their debut on the global music video platform Vevo, unveiling a performance of their song “Blush”. That same month, Bini submitted three entries for the 69th Annual Grammy Awards scheduled for 2027, with "Unang Kilig" subsequently being nominated for the inaugural Grammy Award for Best Asian Pop Music Performance.

On October 17, Bini headlined their first concert in Tacloban called Unfiltered. In November, Bini released "Sama-Sama Tayo" (transl. Us Together) in collaboration with the Philippine Department of Tourism. It is described as a pop song with EDM influences and lyrics paying tribute to the 2026 ASEAN Summits.

== Artistry ==
=== Musical style ===
"Oxygen"
An 18-second sample of "Oxygen" by Bini, where the chorus can be heard. The song has earned praise for blending pop with elements of classical music, with The Beat Asia's Katrina Ricarte writing that it "pushes the boundaries of P-pop".

Bini's discography has been widely described as bubblegum pop and teen pop. Bini members Mikha and Gwen have said that the group decided to stick with a bubblegum sound after finding success with "Lagi" (lit. 'Always') in 2022. However, various sources have continued to identify other genres or genre influences within the group's music, such as EDM, funk, pop rock, glam rock, UK garage, tropical house, synth-pop, R&B, soul, and classical music. In an interview with Billboard's Jeff Benjamin, Bini member Colet described the group's sound as "diverse and experimental". In another with JoySauce's Julienne Loreto, the group said of their sound, "When pop, R&B, and hip-hop come together, that makes us Bini."

The group is known for blending their sound with traditional Filipino elements, contributing to a musical style that has been described as both modern and culturally rooted. Ed Power of the Irish music magazine Hot Press described Bini's sound as "maximalist". Rappler's Mika Geronimo recognized the group's "luscious" vocal harmonies and "distinctly Filipino" lyricism as their trademarks, as heard in their 2024 EP Talaarawan (lit. 'Diary').

=== Influences ===
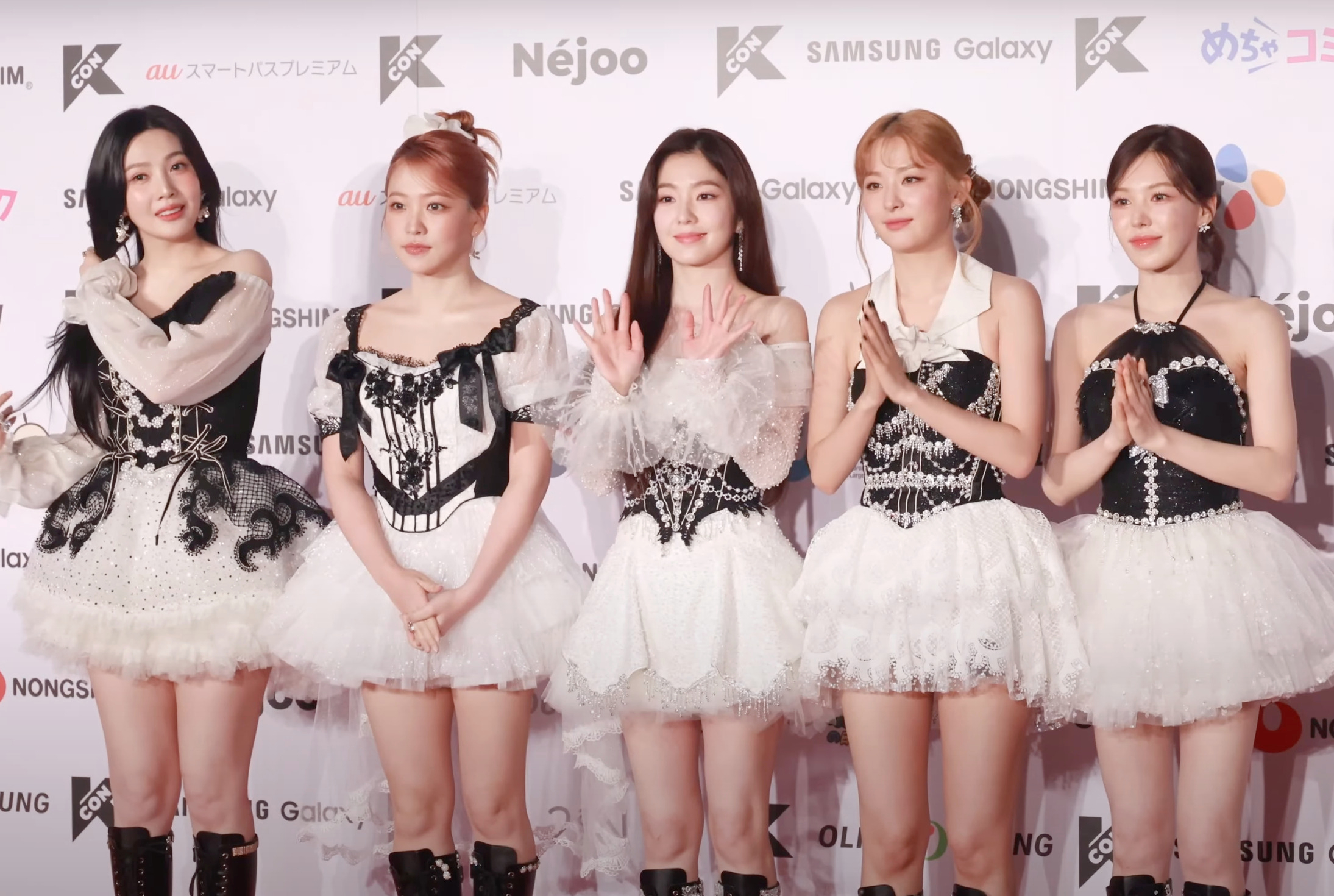
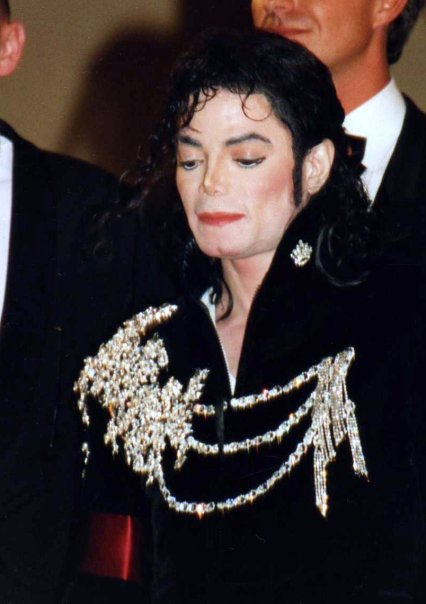
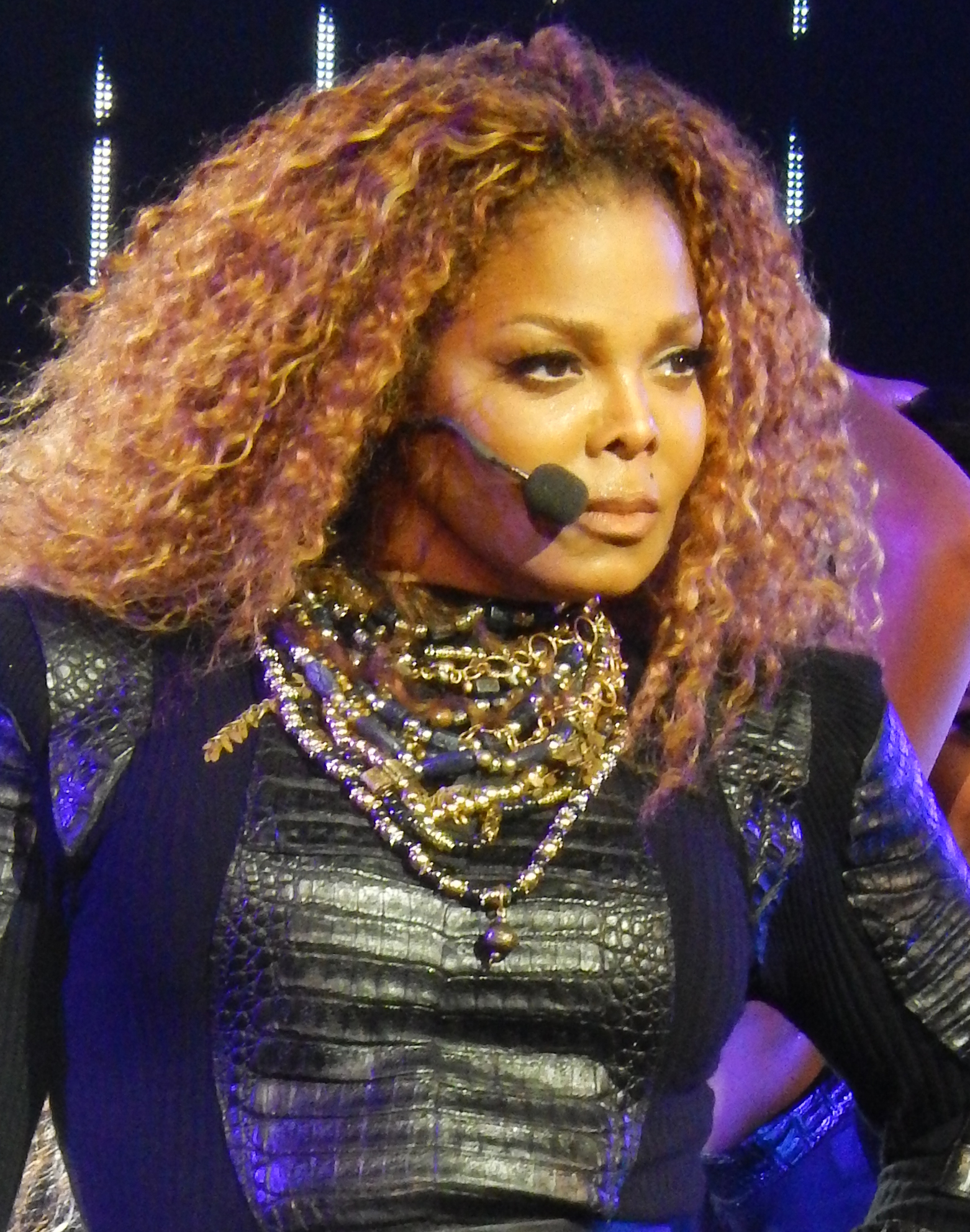
Red Velvet (left), Michael Jackson (center), and Janet Jackson (right) were among named as the influences of Bini.

Star Music initially modeled Bini after the K-pop girl group Red Velvet, especially because of the latter's "dual" and versatile musical concept. However, Bini has asserted that they are not copying K-pop groups, naming Filipino, Western, and Latin American music as their influences as well. Multiple sources have identified Japanese popular music as an influence on some Bini songs as well, specifically city pop and J-pop.

Others have also recognized the impact of Black American artists on Bini's discography. In particular, musician siblings Janet Jackson and Michael Jackson were named as inspirations for the group's extended play (EP) Signals (2026). In an interview with Larissa Wong of Harper's Bazaar Singapore, Maloi further named K-pop groups Blackpink and Twice, as well as singers Sarah Geronimo, Taylor Swift, Sabrina Carpenter, and Dua Lipa as some of Bini's influences.

=== Vocals ===
In 2024, Gelo Gonzales of Rappler highlighted the group's "strong" harmonic singing. According to the group's dance coach Mickey Perz, Bini's instructors developed the group's live singing skills by training them as though they were athletes, not musicians. Following Bini's Coachella debut in 2026, L'Officiel Singapore's Maura Rodriguez said that the group's performance proved that their "undeniable" live vocal talents are their "true strength" rather than relying on glamor or spectacle.

Bini's main vocalists, Colet and Maloi, as well as lead vocalist Jhoanna, are known as the group's "poste (lit. 'pillar') line" or by the portmanteau name "Majholet". They are identified by many as the group's most consistent, reliable singers. In particular, Colet's pharyngeal resonance has been praised by American vocal coach Jessica Robb. A British coach, Caroline Parry, called Colet's voice the "crown jewel" of the group. The trio's vocals have also been compared with the British girl group Little Mix, specifically Colet's "rich" and "robust" timbre with Perrie Edwards'; and Maloi and Jhoanna's "sugary sweet" tones with Jade Thirlwall's and Leigh-Anne Pinnock's respectively, creating a sonic balance when all three voices are utilized effectively in a track. The group's main rapper Stacey has also been recognized for her use of the whistle register in songs such as "Kabataang Pinoy" (transl. Filipino Youth) with SB19.

== Cultural impact ==
Bini is more than just a group of singers and dancers. They are role models, advocates, and storytellers. By using their platform to push for inclusivity, social justice, and female empowerment, Bini is redefining what it means to be a P-pop group.

— Maria Sophia Rosello, talking about Bini's impact in the Philippines (Art+ Magazine, 2024)

Gianna Sibal of Mega magazine praised Bini for championing the Philippine music industry. She wrote that the group provides "a broader appreciation of Philippine music on global platforms". Likewise, Angela Nicole Guiral of Tatler Asia identified Bini as one of the top P-pop acts in terms of advancing the future of the Philippine music industry. In November 2024, the Los Angeles Clippers' Spirit Dance Team performed "Cherry on Top" in celebration of Filipino Heritage Night. The number took place at Intuit Dome in Inglewood, California. Five of the featured dancers were Filipino-American. Rolling Stone Philippines' Elijah Pareño described Bini as "cultural forces reshaping the Pinoy pop landscape through raw authenticity rather than manufactured glamor".

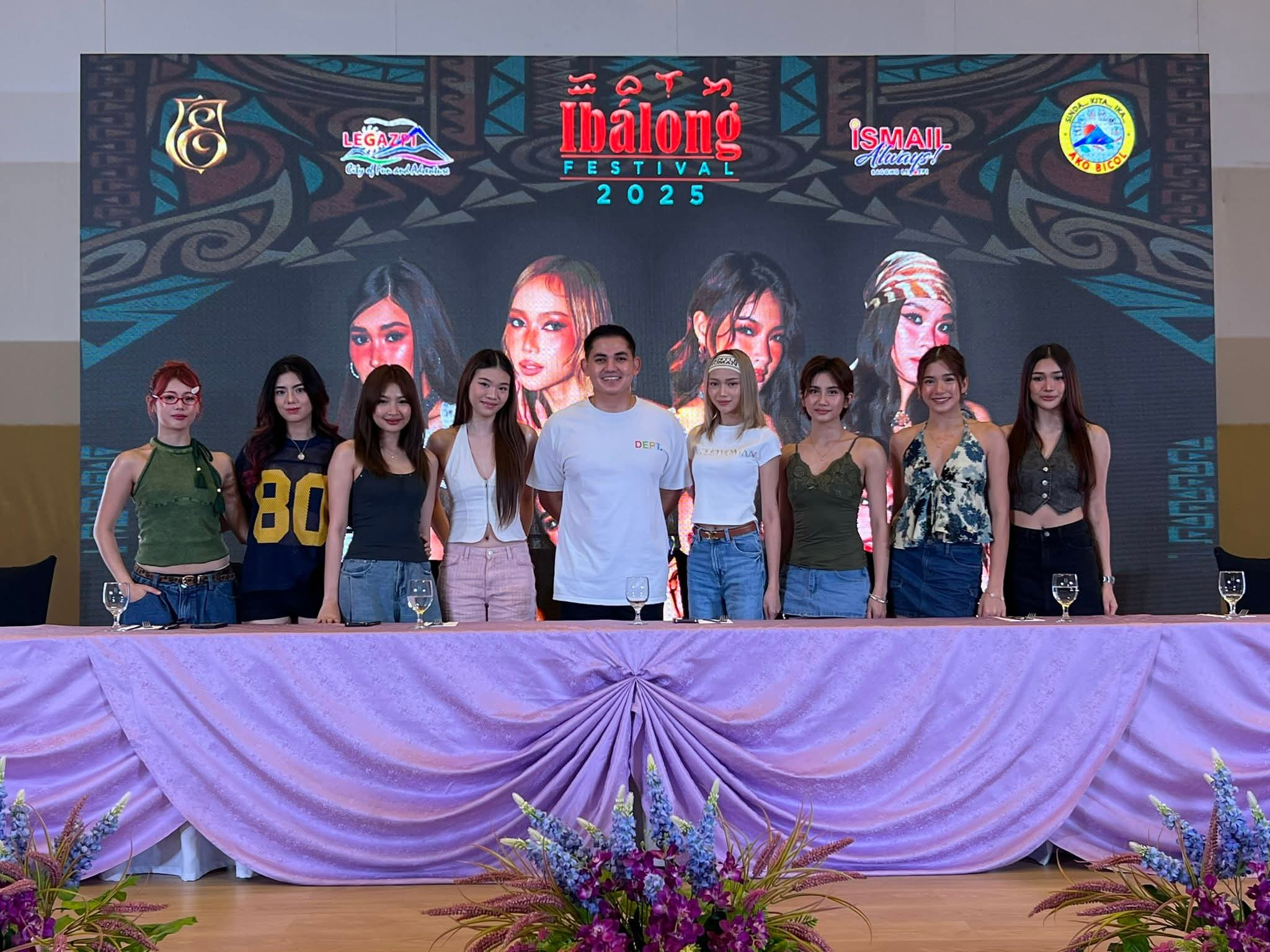
Bini with Legazpi mayor Hisham Ismail in September 2025

Sibal also credited Bini's Roadtrip Adventures vlog series, made in collaboration with the Department of Tourism, for bolstering local tourism. Bini have been recognized for promoting Filipino culture, even in their English-language songs such as "Cherry on Top". Christa Escudero of Rappler described Bini as a strong representation of Filipino talent on the global stage in 2024.

Apart from boosting national pride, Bini have been noted to represent diverse ethnic identities among Gen Z Filipinos as well. The members of the group hail from different regions and cultural backgrounds. Some of their songs, such as "B Hu U R" (Note: Pronounced as "Be who you are") from their first album, Born to Win, feature different Philippine languages, including Ilocano and Aklanon. In Escudero's feature about the Cebu leg of the Biniverse tour, a 22-year-old concertgoer was quoted as saying, "Bini is a victory for us Bisaya, and a victory for our country". Writing for the American magazine Positively Filipino, Julienne Loreto observed that Bini's rapid rise in popularity encouraged many fans, known as Blooms, to take an interest in learning Cebuano. Supporters expressed a desire to study the language to better connect with and understand Cebuano-speaking members Aiah and Colet.

Google Philippines country director Jackie Wang noted that Bini has played a key role in redefining Pinoy pop culture both locally and internationally. She added that digital platforms such as YouTube have been instrumental in helping the group broaden their audience, set new trends, and engage with their fanbase.

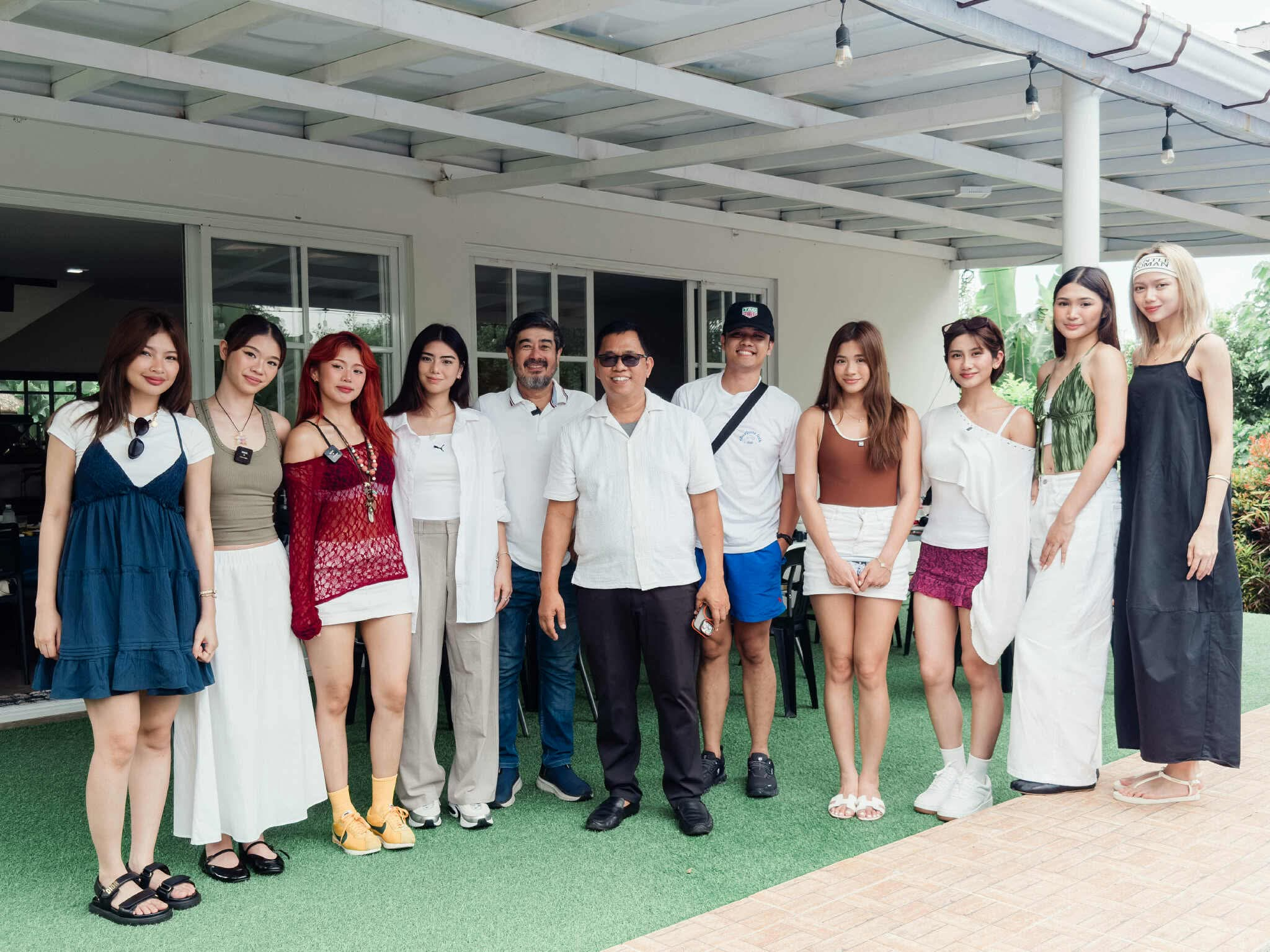
Bini with third district representative of Camarines Sur Nelson Legacion.

Marielle Filoteo of Parcinq described Bini as a feminist girl group. She wrote that they "celebrate femininity in every concept". Maria Sophia Rosello of Art+ echoed the sentiment a year later, following the release of Talaarawan. She noted that the mini-album was released on International Women's Day and said that each track "celebrat[es] female strength, resilience, and individuality". Hannah Mallorca of the Philippine Daily Inquirer noted that the group's increased influence had led to them being invited to events focusing on female empowerment and other social issues. In the interview, the members affirmed that they want to empower women through their music and other ventures. Colet told the publication that being recognized as young women in the industry gave them a sense of empowerment and responsibility, noting that as public figures, their voices carry weight in discussions of important issues.

In 2025, Jose Alfonso Mirabueno graduated summa cum laude from the University of the Philippines Diliman with a Bachelor of Music degree in musicology. His thesis, "Lagi Nang Umaawit: (Note: lit. 'Always Singing', derived from the lyrics to the Bini single "Lagi") Articulations of Modernity in the Pop Music of Bini", explored how Bini's music conveys different meanings of modernity and womanhood, which were shaped collaboratively by the group and their production team. Allan Batuhan of SunStar Cebu noted that Bini's background reflects years of training and perseverance rather than privilege, and wrote that their Coachella 2026 performance would likely draw support from the large Filipino community in California.

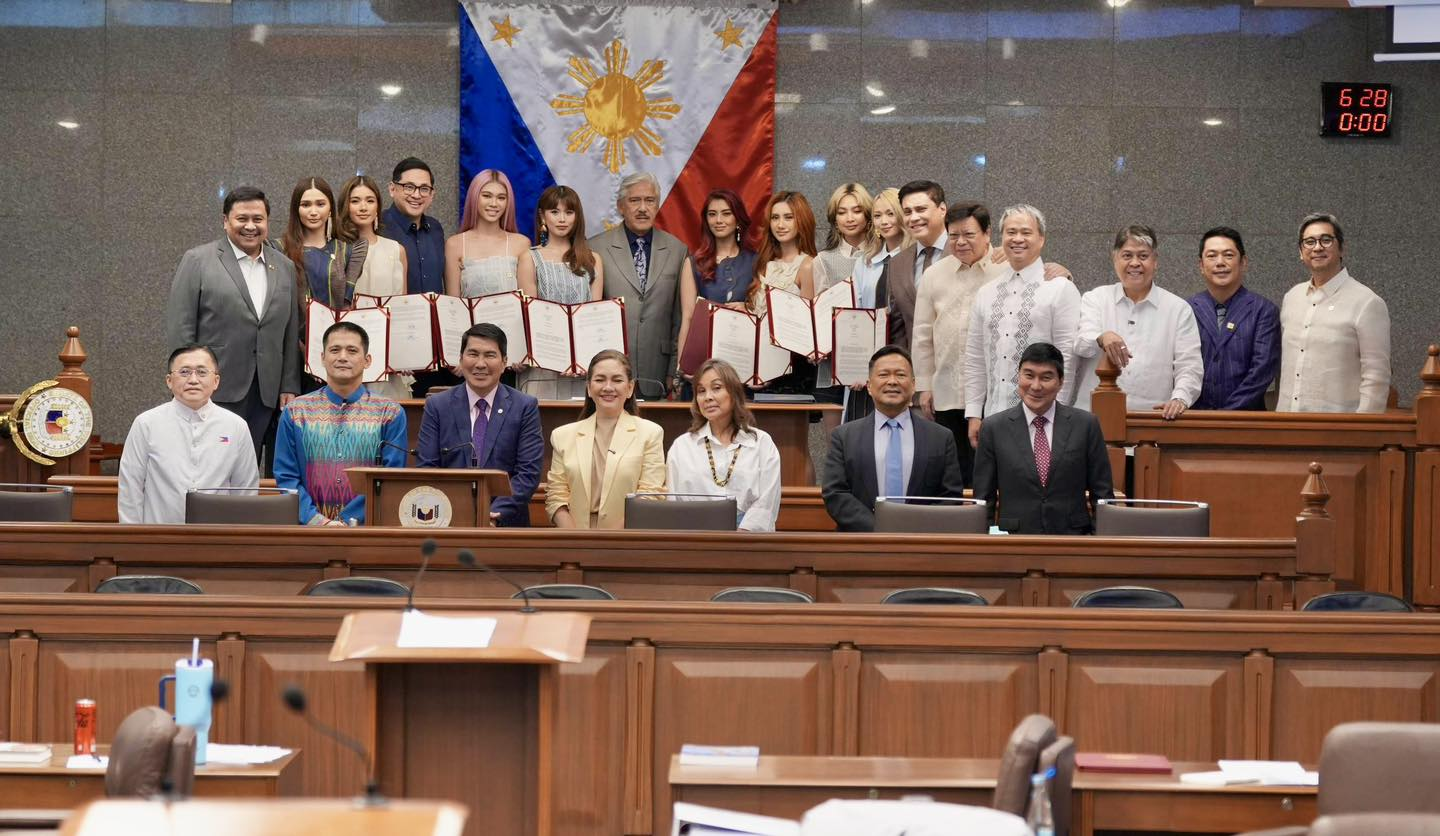
Bini at the Senate of the Philippines, being honored for their Coachella 2026 performance

On May 1, the Japanese firm Tsurezure Lab released a study examining the shift of Southeast Asian audiences from K-pop and Western pop toward homegrown music genres, steadily gaining ground on streaming charts since 2023. It identified Bini as one of the acts leading the shift, citing its strong domestic streaming performance and reflecting OPM's evolution into a modern, Gen Z-driven mainstream. The study also noted that Bini is increasingly competing directly with K-pop acts on Southeast Asian charts.

=== Impact upon the LGBTQ+ community ===
Multiple sources have noted the impact of Bini, their music, and their allyship upon the LGBTQ+ community. Gianna Sibal of the Filipino magazine Mega hailed the group as some of the Philippine media's "most ardent" allies. She further observed that "Huwag Muna Tayong Umuwi" (lit. 'Let's Not Go Home Yet'), a love song by Bini, has become popular within the community. Co-written by the openly queer Nica del Rosario, the song has gained recognition for the "genderless" nature of its lyrics and is perceived as a sapphic anthem by some. "B Hu U R", a track from their first album Born to Win, is also widely perceived as a queer anthem; Bini member Maloi once included a link to the song in a post in support of Pride Month and the group performed it with drag queens at the Biniverse concert tour. Del Rosario's composition "Ang Huling Chacha"—a track on the Bini EP Talaarawan (lit. 'Diary')—was also named after Ang Huling Cha-Cha Ni Anita (lit. 'Anita's Last Dance'), a film about a young lesbian's self-discovery.

On September 17, 2025, episode six, season one of Drag Race Philippines: Slaysian Royale used the Bini track "Out of my Head" as a lipsync song. In October, the music video for the Bini single "First Luv" explicitly depicts a sapphic romantic storyline between the openly bisexual Klarisse de Guzman and her real-life girlfriend Trina Rey, which earned praise from the press for breaking barriers in terms of media representation for queer women. When asked by the Los Angeles Times' August Brown regarding the sapphic representation in "First Luv", Maloi asserted that the group intentionally seeks to be inclusive. She added that the LGBTQ+ community in the Philippines is "so big".

=== Fandom ===
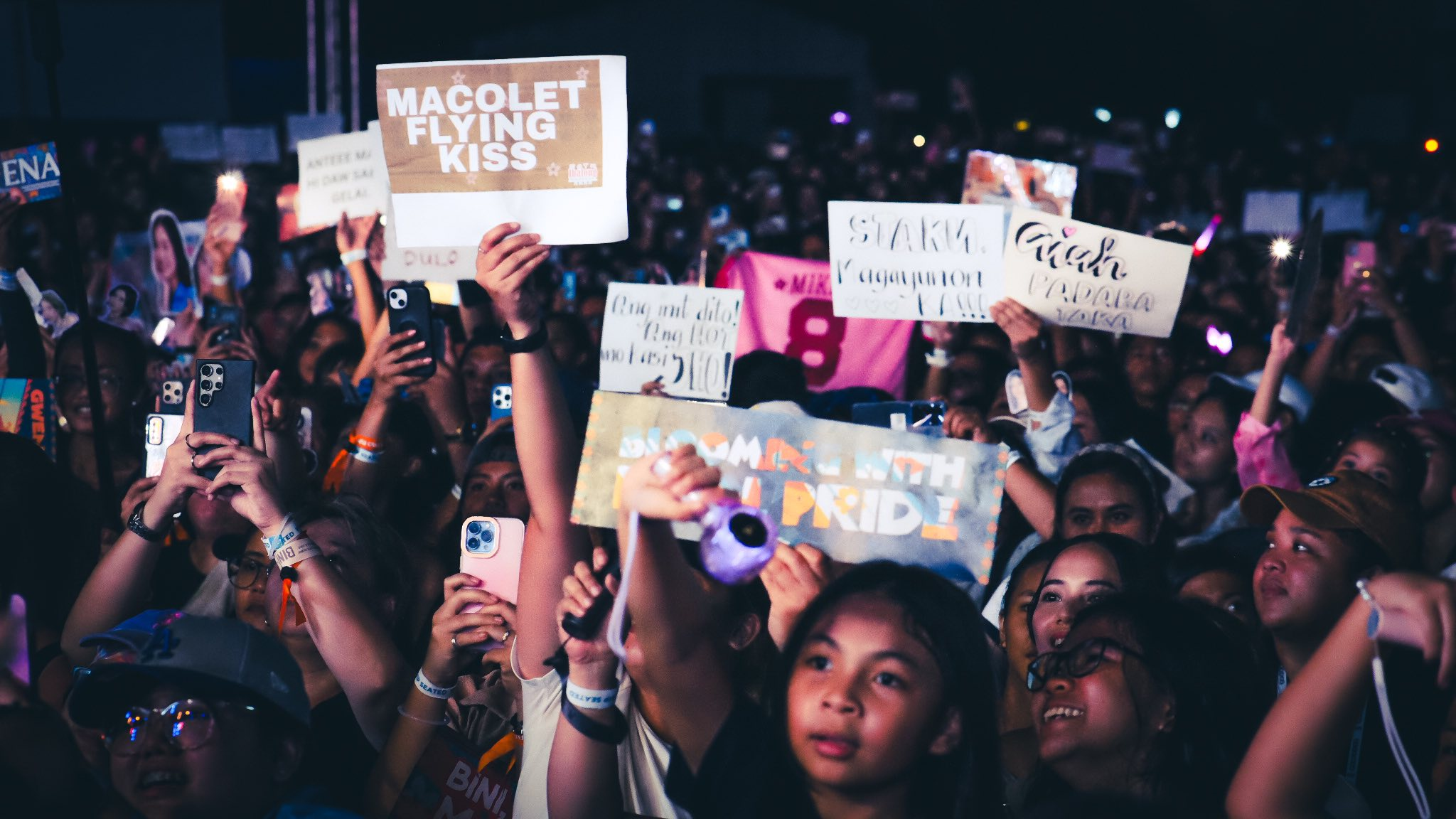
"Blooms" holding their fan signs in support of the girl group

Bini fans are known as "Bloom(s)", often stylized as BL∞M(S), with the infinity symbol replacing the "o"s. This styling is inspired by the group's tagline walo hanggang dulo (lit. 'eight until the end'). The name "Bloom" reflects Bini's journey and symbolizes the idea of renewal and beauty emerging after challenges, similar to the arrival of spring. It was chosen from fan suggestions during a special announcement livestream on February 13, 2021. Blooms have been compared to other prominent fandoms such as Taylor Swift's Swifties, Beyoncé's Beyhive, and BTS' Army. The group's interactive content has also played a role in encouraging fan participation and strengthening their connection with audiences. Gabriel Saulog of Billboard Philippines described Bini's fanbase as community-oriented, passionate, and supportive, noting its growth since the group's pre-debut. He also credited Bloom Philippines co-administrators Gabriel Angeles and Jaden Ramos for their dedication to the group. Toni Potenciano of Rolling Stone Philippines observed the rapid growth of Bini's fanbase, describing how their audience has multiplied and venues have expanded. Potenciano also highlighted that fans carry the group's official flower-shaped light sticks, known as the "Bloombilyas".

== Other ventures ==
=== Athletics ===
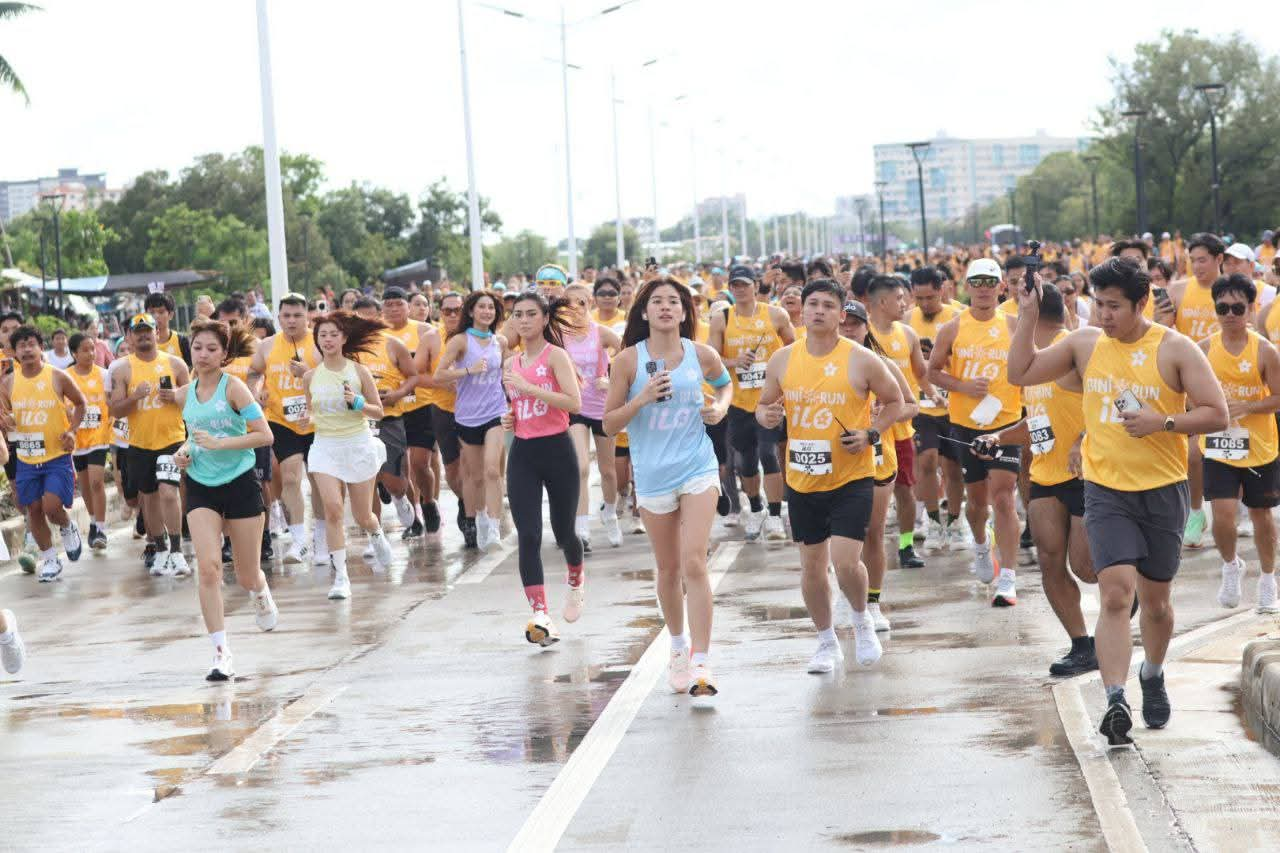
Bini Run 2025 in Iloilo City with Colet, Mikha, and Aiah

On June 23, 2024, Bini organized a five-kilometer fun run titled the "Bini Run" along Roxas Boulevard in Manila. A second fun run was held in Alabang, Muntinlupa, on January 19, 2025, and was attended by more than 7,000 runners. Another iteration of the Bini Run was held in Iloilo City on October 11, 2025, with more than 2,000 runners in attendance. The Iloilo government described the event as a moment where "grace meets culture".

=== Endorsements ===
Since their debut, Bini has been on several endorsement deals, reflecting their broad appeal and influence, especially among Gen Z consumers. In September 2022, Bini unveiled their collaboration with cosmetic brand Maybelline by releasing their promotional single "Made for All".

In February 2023, Bini was unveiled as the new ambassador of the feminine hygiene brand Modess, teaming up for a menstrual campaign. In July of the same year, the group became the ambassador of the snack brand Super Crunch, releasing a full-track promotional single titled "Super Crush".

In March 2024, Bini became one of the ambassadors of Samsung for their new Galaxy A series. On April 13 and 14, the group participated in Samsung's promotional event at SM North EDSA Annex in Quezon City, and in its Samsung Galaxy AI Festival in Bonifacio Global City in Taguig on July 13.

The supermarket chain Puregold also announced its collaboration with the group. Puregold released a music video for their new promotional song "Nasa Atin ang Panalo" (lit. 'Victory is Within Us') on May 25, a collaboration between OPM acts Bini, Flow G, SB19, and SunKissed Lola, with a separate music video solely performed by Bini for the same song released on June 25. The group also participated in the supermarket chain's thanksgiving concert on July 12 at the Araneta Coliseum.

On May 28, the e-commerce company Shopee introduced Bini as its new brand ambassador as part of its effort to engage with the Filipino Gen Z market. On June 17, Filipino fast food chain Jollibee announced Bini as its new ambassador, coincided with the launch of a new cheeseburger item, held at Trinoma in Quezon City. As part of the endorsement, Jollibee released a limited edition "JolliBini Meals" menu that included 17 collectible photo cards, two for each member, and a special group photo card serving as a special fan meet ticket. The fan meeting with Bini was organized on September 15. A second “JolliBini Meals” collaboration was launched in July 2026, featuring a random collectible set that includes a member bag charm and special photocards. On August 12, cosmetic brand MAC Cosmetics revealed Bini as their new brand ambassador, coinciding with the release of a new product lineup. As part of the endorsement, the group made a special appearance at the brand's product launch event at the SM Mall of Asia Music Hall on August 30.

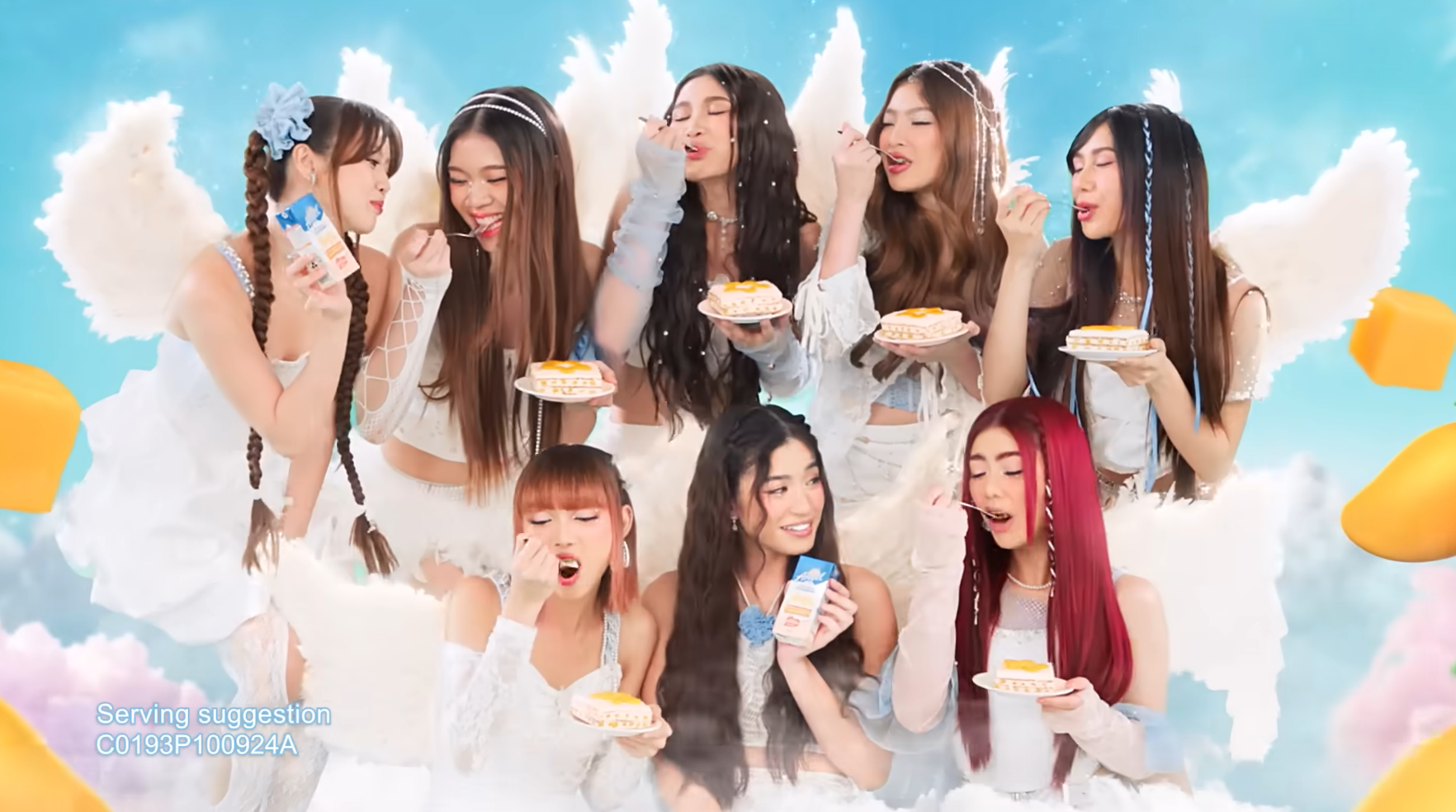
Bini in "Mango on Top", a promotional pastiche of their 2024 song "Cherry on Top"

In late 2024, Bini secured several new endorsement deals, expanding their presence across various industries. In September, the group was named the ambassadors for CDO Idol, a hotdog brand; Fudgee Barr, a snack cake brand; and Sunsilk, a shampoo brand. Bini also served as ambassadors for Nescafé, Enervon and Bioderm.

In October, the group became the ambassadors for the clothing brand Penshoppe, releasing a promotional single titled "Icon". On November 15, the Philippine bookstore chain, National Book Store (NBS), unveiled their limited-edition "NBS x Bini collection", which included school and office supplies featuring chibi illustrations of the Bini members.

In February 2025, IAM Worldwide named Bini as their newest brand ambassadors for Amazing Choco Barley. In March 2025, Bini partnered with Akari Lighting & Technology for the latter's portable fans lineup, a collaboration that culminated in a fan meet event in September 2025. On April 30, 2025, Baobab Eyewear announced Bini as its first celebrity ambassadors with the release of Binivision, featuring limited edition Bini-themed eyewear and photocards. In the same month, Payless Instant Noodles announced Bini as its newest brand ambassadors.

As part of its 2025 edition of "Share a Coke" marketing campaign, Coca-Cola inscribed the names of the Bini members and their fan group name, Blooms, on its bottles sold in the Philippines. On August 15, Bini partnered with Surf and headlined "Haba-Habango Day" event at SMX Aura, which also featured their fan community. In September, Globe launched their #GoForIt campaign with Bini, pairing eight student dreamers with the eight members of Bini. Bini also partnered with Buscopan and was one of the headliners in a fan meet in February 2026.

In April 2026, Bini became an official endorser of Nike, appearing in one of Nike's Icons Meet Icons campaign videos. In May 2026, Spanish clothing retailer Bershka released an oversized Bini shirt featuring a vibrant portrait grid of all eight members.

In July 2022, Bini collaborated with Coca-Cola for Coke Studio Philippines' sixth season. The group co-wrote the single "Love Yourself" with a fan, and it was released as part of the Coke Studio Fan Fusion EP. The season was the first to introduce collaborations between artists and fans. For the seventh season, in October 2023, the group worked with the hip-hop group PlayerTwo, performing a reimagined rendition of Iñigo Pascual and Ron Henley's "Bata, Kaya Mo!" (lit. 'You Can Do It, Kid!'), a song from the third season. In November 2024, Bini collaborated again for the eighth season, in which it released the single "Blooming". For the ninth season, Bini, in collaboration with the Orchestra of the Filipino Youth, released a new song titled "Oxygen" for the ninth season, and performed at the Coke Studio Live concert at the Araneta Coliseum in Quezon City on September 5, 2025. For the tenth season, Bini performed at the Coke Studio Live concert at the SM Mall of Asia Arena on November 7, 2026.

=== Philanthropy ===
On November 28, 2020, Bini participated on a virtual fundraising concert entitled #TikTokTogetherPH hosted by TikTok Philippines for the benefit of Generation Hope, World Vision, the Philippine Animal Welfare Society (PAWS), and Balcony Entertainment along with other artists and vloggers in the Philippines.

On December 20, 2020, the group, alongside other P-pop idol groups, performed on ABS-CBN's 2020 Christmas Special fundraising pre-show, KTnX Ang Babait Ninyo. (Note: lit. 'KTnx You are all so kind') Proceeds from the show were donated to ABS-CBN Foundation's for the typhoon victims.

Bini have also expressed support for the LGBT community, citing their support for them at an event with Filipino drag queens in Quezon City in May 2024.

At UP Fair 2024, they advocated for Indigenous rights in the Philippines, particularly the protection of their ancestral lands.

On October 25, 2024, Bini announced that ₱1 million (US$20,304.57) from their Grand Biniverse concert ticket sales would be donated to ABS-CBN Foundation's Sagip Kapamilya (Note: lit. 'Family Rescue') program to support relief efforts for the victims of Tropical Storm Kristine (Trami).

During the "Here with You" homecoming fan meet held on June 29, 2025, Bini donated ₱362,000 (US$7,350.25) to the ABS-CBN Foundation. The amount was raised through sales of Bini merchandise.

On September 22, Bini issued a joint statement on X, with members also sharing messages individually, voicing their support for the "Trillion Peso March" and "Baha sa Luneta" (lit. 'Flood in Luneta'), amid protests against corruption in the Philippines.

=== Webcast ===
On March 15, 2021, ABS-CBN announced that they were partnering with Filipino social networking service Kumu to bring over 100 artists that will stream on the app, participate in Kumu campaigns, and get to interact with their fans more regularly on the platform, in what was described as the biggest celebrity streaming partnership in the country. Bini was among those who joined the campaign.

== Accolades ==
Throughout their career, Bini saw received numerous accolades, including five Awit Awards, twelve P-pop Music Awards, and an MTV Music Award. In 2021, their debut single "Born To Win" was nominated for Wish Pop Song of the Year at the Wish Music Awards. Their second album, Feel Good, produced the single "Lagi", which earned several nominations at the 2023 Awit Awards, including Record of the Year and Song of the Year. That same year, the group won International New Artist Song at the BreakTudo Awards and was named Top Favorite Group of the Year at the Ppop Music Awards, where Aiah, Sheena and Jhoanna also received individual honors. In 2024, the group continued their success with multiple wins, including Concert of the Year for Grand Biniverse at the Ppop Music Awards.

In 2025, Bini was named Top Local Artist of the Year during the inaugural ceremony of the Official Philippines Chart. That same month, they received two awards at the Platinum Stallion National Media Awards. The group was also recognized as Women of the Year by Billboard Philippines Women in Music event.

In March 2026, Bini was named Powerhouse of the Year by Billboard Philippines for the third consecutive year. The following month, the group received the Global Force Award at the Billboard Women in Music event. In October 2026, they won Artist of the Year at the Filipino Music Awards, the Global Impact Award at Dangal ng Musikang Pilipino 2026, and the FAMAS Youth Achievement Award. On November 14, Bini was named Favorite Global Music Star at the 2026 Kids' Choice Awards. Two days later, their single "Unang Kilig" earned the group its first Grammy Award nomination in the inaugural Best Asian Pop Music Performance category at the 69th Annual Grammy Awards.

== Band members ==
- Aiah – visual, main rapper, sub-vocalist
- Colet – main vocalist, lead rapper, lead dancer
- Maloi – main vocalist
- Gwen – lead vocalist, lead rapper
- Stacey – main rapper, lead dancer, sub-vocalist
- Mikha – visual, main rapper, lead dancer
- Jhoanna – leader, lead vocalist, lead rapper
- Sheena – main dancer, sub-vocalist

== Discography ==
Studio albums

- Born to Win (2021)
- Feel Good (2022)
- Flames (2025)

== Filmography ==
=== Documentaries ===
- Bini & BGYO Dubai Adventures: A Docufilm (2022)
- Bini Chapter 1: Born To Win (2024)
- Bini Chapter 2: Here With You (2024)
- Bini Chapter 3: Hanggang Dulo (2025)

== Concerts ==
=== Headlining tours ===
- Biniverse (2024)
- Biniverse World Tour 2025 (2025)
- Signals World Tour 2026 (2026)
