= Huwag Muna Tayong Umuwi =

Song by Bini

from the album Feel Good
- Language: Tagalog
- English title: Let's Not Go Home Yet
- Released: September 29, 2022
- Genre: Pop rock; arena rock
- Length: 4:57
- Label: Star Music
- Composer: Gianina Camille "Nica" del Rosario
- Producers: Jonathan Manalo; Julius James "Jumbo" De Belen

Lyric video
- "Huwag Muna Tayong Umuwi" on YouTube

"Huwag Muna Tayong Umuwi" (lit. 'Let's Not Go Home Yet') is a song recorded by the Filipino girl group Bini. It is a track from their second album, Feel Good, released on September 29, 2022. The track is a mid-tempo pop rock and arena rock ballad with a glam rock influence, in which the narrator hopes to spend more time with their love interest. Its lyrics were written by Gianina Camille "Nica" del Rosario and Julius James "Jumbo" de Belen, with both also providing vocal arrangement for the song. Jonathan Manalo was the song's executive producer, with de Belen also being credited for production. De Belen and Ryan Bautista are credited for providing the song's guitar riffs. It was recorded by Tim Recla.

The song was one of the official soundtracks for the 2022 romantic comedy film An Inconvenient Love. In 2024, the track peaked at number 16 on Billboard Philippines's Hot 100 chart. The song received favorable reviews from critics, who praised the song's focus on the Bini members' vocals and romantic lyrical content.

== Background and release ==
The Philippine pop girl group Bini trained for three years under Star Hunt Academy. In 2020, Bini released a pre-release single, "Da Coconut Nut", a cover of a 1990s Ryan Cayabyab song that added a hint of bubblegum pop to the reggae-influenced original. On June 11, 2021, Bini officially debuted, consisting of eight members: Aiah, Colet, Maloi, Gwen, Stacey, Mikha, Jhoanna, and Sheena. Their debut single "Born to Win" was an inspirational song with a sci-fi and fantasy-themed music video.

On October 14, Bini released their first album, also titled Born to Win. Following the release of several non-album singles, Bini released "Lagi" (transl. Always), the first pre-release single from their second album, Feel Good. On September 29, Star Music released Feel Good, which included the track "Huwag Muna Tayong Umuwi" (transl. Let's Not Go Home Yet).

== Composition and lyrics ==
"Huwag Muna Tayong Umuwi"
An 15-second sample of "Huwag Muna Tayong Umuwi". Nylon Manila's Rafael Bautista praised the song's guitar riffs and &Asian's Julienne Loreto identified a glam rock influence on the track.

"Huwag Muna Tayong Umuwi" is four minutes and fifty-seven seconds long. The song has been described as a mid-tempo pop power ballad, as well as a pop rock song with gritty guitars. In July 2025, Julienne Loreto of &Asian remarked that the song "wouldn't sound out of place" in a glam rock album; a comparison echoed by Elijah Pareño of Rolling Stone Philippines in April 2026. It has also been described as an arena rock ballad with trap-inspired drum loops. Its lyrics were written by Gianina Camille "Nica" del Rosario and Julius James "Jumbo" de Belen (Note: Also professionally credited as "Bojam".) of FlipMusic. (Note: FlipMusic is a Philippine production house.) Both are also credited for vocal arrangement and de Belen is credited for production, mixing, and mastering. Jonathan Manalo was the song's executive producer and Tim Recla was the recording engineer. Ryan Bautista, along with de Belen, provided guitar work for the song. The lowest note in the song is a C_{3}, sung by Colet in the track's intro.

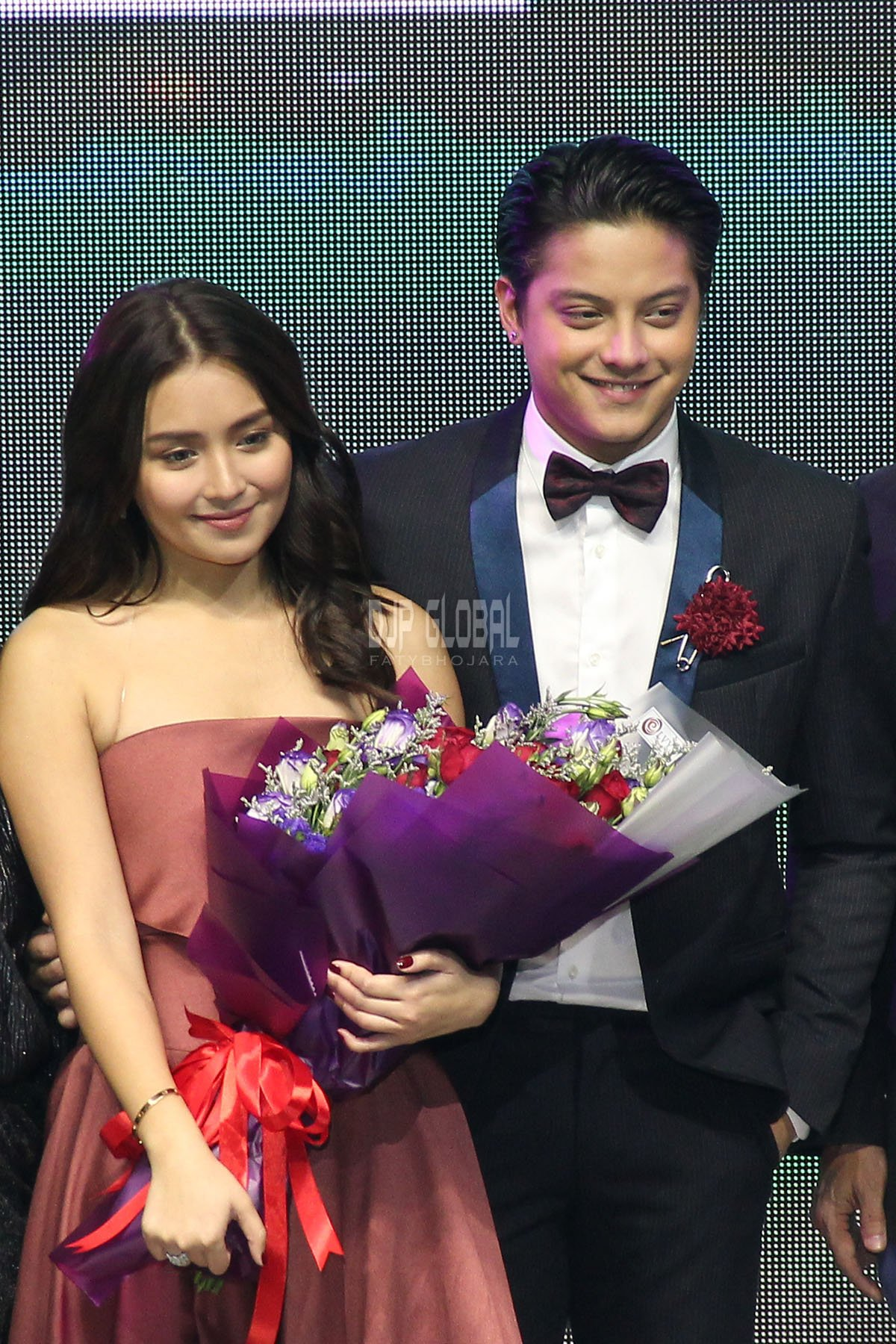
Kathryn Bernardo and Daniel Padilla (pictured)

The lyrics use vivid imagery to convey the narrator's desire to spend more time with their love interest, hoping that they will not go home yet. De Belen drew inspiration from the 2018 romantic drama film The Hows of Us for the song, particularly the scene in which Kathryn Bernardo and Daniel Padilla argued in the rain. The members of Bini memorized the dialogue so they could feel the right emotions when they recorded the song. In an interview, Del Rosario, who is a lesbian, said that the sapphic undertones of the song were unintentional. She added, "The fact that other people see it as a queer love song just furthers the point that queer love and straight love aren't that different from each other." However, on X, del Rosario supported a fan when they referred to the song as a "sapphic anthem".

== Reception ==
"Huwag Muna Tayong Umuwi" garnered favorable reviews from music critics. Nylon Manila's Rafael Bautista wrote, "['Umuwi'] is the kind of song we were waiting for Bini to drop, one that dials back a bit on the beats and gives the girls more space to show off their vocals. It takes full advantage of their singing prowess, and that's for the better." He also praised Bautista and de Belen's guitar riffs. Ann Jenireene Gomez of Daily Tribune commended the song, along with "Karera", for showcasing the group's harmonies and "powerful" vocals. Billboard Philippines included the song in a list featuring twenty of the staff's top love songs of all time; writer Gabriel Saulog hailed the track as "vibrant" and "sincere". He praised it for effectively conveying the excitement of youthful romance, particularly the thrill of forming a spontaneous connection with another person.

In the week of July 6, 2024, "Huwag Muna Tayong Umuwi" peaked at number 16 on Billboard Philippines's Hot 100 chart. Gianna Sibal of Mega noted that the song heavily resonates with the LGBTQIA+ community, due to the "genderless" nature of the love song, as well as the fact that it was co-written by the openly queer Nica del Rosario. Kate Sudiacal of The Filipino Times observed that the song was also gaining popularity among Overseas Filipino Workers (OFWs), even though the song was not written with them in mind. She remarked that the song captures a "deep appreciation for the experiences and challenges of living abroad", thus connecting with OFWs. In July 2025, Billboard Philippines included the song in its list of P-pop songs that could "save the Hon-moon", a protective barrier that saves the world from demons, as featured in the film KPop Demon Hunters.

== Other media ==
"Huwag Muna Tayong Umuwi" is a part of the soundtrack for An Inconvenient Love, a 2022 Philippine romantic comedy film starring Belle Mariano and Donny Pangilinan, as one of its official theme songs. Trailers for the film prominently featured the song. According to Acer Batislaong of Nylon Manila, the song was a "perfect fit" for An Inconvenient Love, writing that the song heightened the film's emotions during crucial scenes. Mariano and Pangilinan have performed covers of the track multiple times, including a piano-driven rendition at Mariano's July 2024 birthday concert, Believe. On October 24, Bini performed "Huwag Muna Tayong Umuwi", along with "I Feel Good", on It's Showtime's 15th anniversary special.

== Personnel ==
Credits are adapted from Apple Music.

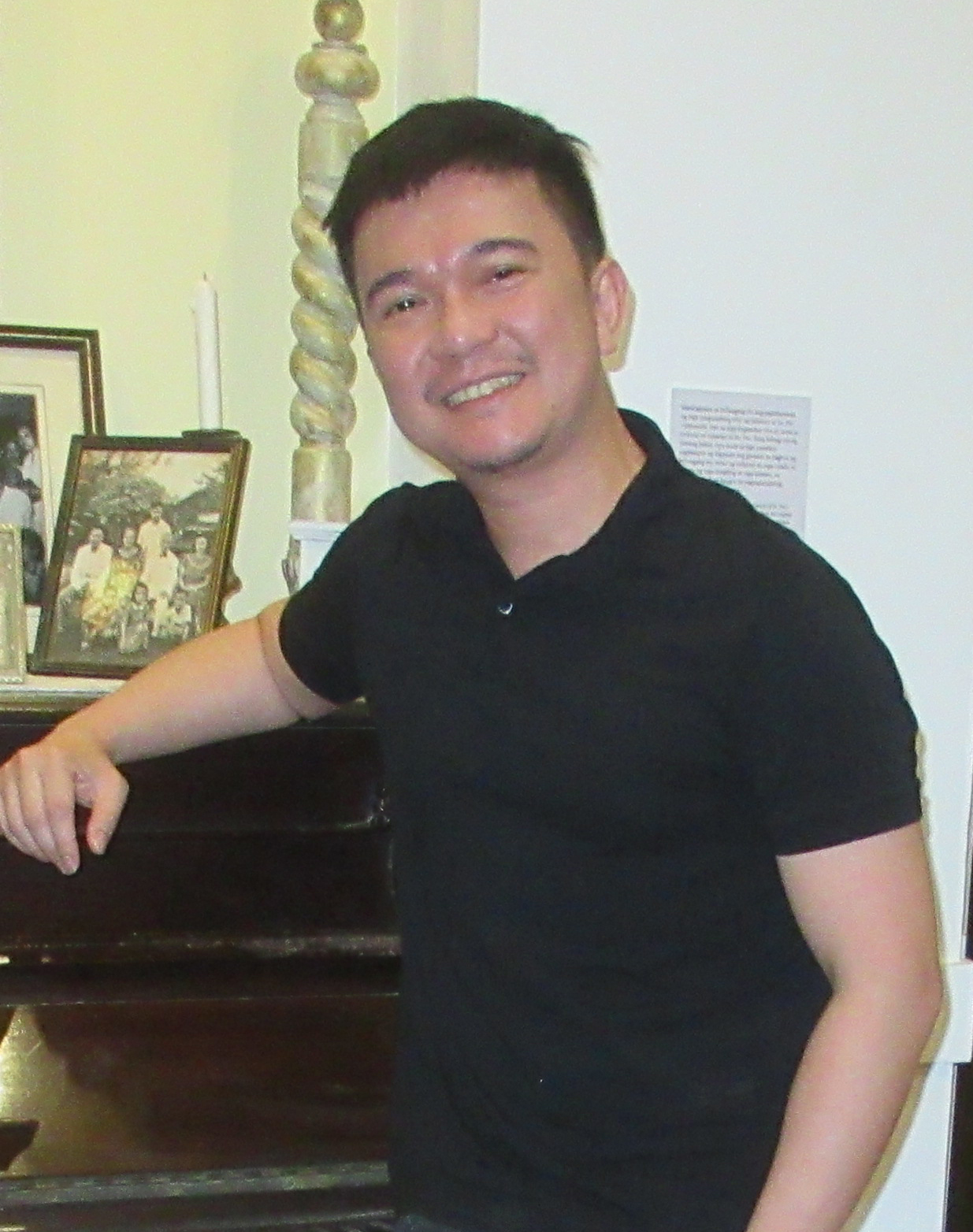
Jonathan Manalo, the song's executive producer

Musicians

- Bini – vocals
- Jumbo de Belen – guitar
- Ryan Bautista – guitar

Technical

- Nica del Rosario – vocal arrangement
- Jonathan Manalo – executive producer
- Jumbo de Belen – mixing, mastering, vocal arrangement, production
- Tim Recla – recording

== Charts ==
Chart (2024)	Peak position
Philippines (Philippines Hot 100)	16

== Listicles ==
Name of publisher, year listed, name of listicle, and placement
Publisher	Year	Listicle	Placement	Ref.
The Filipino Times	2024	The OFW Playlist: OPM songs that OFWs can listen to	Placed	
Billboard Philippines	2025	20 Love Songs That Never Fail To Make Us Swoon – Staff Picks	Placed	
Billboard Philippines	2025	5 P-pop Songs That Could Save the Hon-moon	Placed	
