= Kaogma Festival =

Annual festival in Camarines Sur, Philippines

The Kaogma Festival marks the foundation day (May 27, 1569) of Camarines Sur in the Philippines.The researchers found that the birth date of the province is May 27, 1589. It originated in Naga City, and for several years

Kaogma Festival is a week-long pageant of colorful activities. The Kaogma Festival title has been modified to "Kaogma Mardi Gras: the World's Hottest Festival". Kaogma translates to "a good time" in the local dialect.

The festival was first celebrated on May 15, 1989. But before, it was just a one-day celebration.

Its May 2005 celebration featured an array of events such as the "Hot Banda Jam", "Hot Buys", Buruntolan, "Hot Kids Starquest", the "Hot New Singing Star Search", "Miss Camarines Sur 2005", "Camarines Sur bids for Guinness World Record", "Silliest Plaza Contest", a thanksgiving Mass, "Hot Grand Parade", and a "Hot Party". That was the first time when all main activities of the Kaogma Festival were held within the Provincial Capitol Complex in Cadlan, Pili, Camarines Sur.

The festival features numerous cultural activities such as expositions, sports events, beauty pageant, singing competition, processional grand parade and street dance competitions. This series of events are mounted to create an excellent opportunity and platform for Camsur talent, craftsmanship and creativity. Since 2017, the free festival is now celebrated for 10 days every last week of May, held at Pili Freedom Sports Complex, featuring live bands, celebrity guesting concerts and carnival rides.
