= Gwen (singer) =

Filipino singer and model (born 2003)

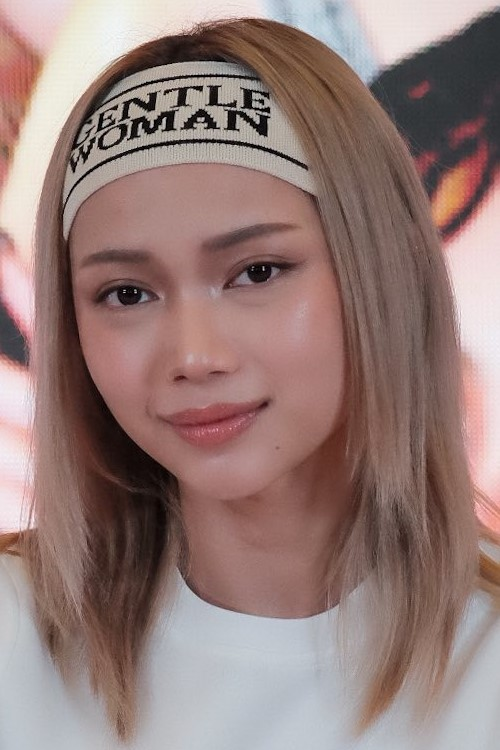
- Gwen at the Ibalong Festival in September 2025
- Born: Gweneth Llaguno Apuli; June 19, 2003 (age 23); Daraga, Albay, Philippines
- Education: Japan-Philippines Institute of Technology
- Occupations: Singer; performer; model
- Years active: 2020–present
- Musical career
- Genres: P-pop; bubblegum pop; teen pop; EDM
- Instruments: Vocals
- Label: Star
- Member of: Bini

Gweneth Llaguno Apuli (born June 19, 2003), known mononymously as Gwen, is a Filipino singer, rapper, dancer, and model. She began her career in modeling in her home province of Albay, where she first attracted attention in the Mr. and Ms. Teen Pacific Heartthrob beauty pageant in 2019. That same year, she joined the reality competition show Pinoy Big Brother: Otso.

Following her television appearance, she debuted in 2021 as one of the lead vocalists and lead rappers of the Filipino girl group Bini. She has since contributed to the original soundtrack for the 2024 Filipino romantic comedy series What's Wrong with Secretary Kim and received media coverage for her makeup content. In 2025, she was featured in an interview on Ogie Diaz Inspires.

== Life and career ==
Gweneth Llaguno Apuli was born on June 19, 2003, in Daraga, Albay, Philippines. Gwen has four brothers and is the youngest of five siblings. Her father died when she was four, leaving her and her siblings under the care of her mother, Malou. According to her friend, actress Barbie Imperial, Gwen grew up in poverty and attended voice workshops during her childhood. She graduated high school in 2025 from the Japan-Philippines Institute of Technology.

Before joining the reality competition show Pinoy Big Brother (PBB), Gwen modeled in Albay. She was the first runner-up in the Mr. and Ms. Teen Pacific Heartthrob beauty pageant in 2019. On April 7, 2019, Gwen was announced as one of the Star Dreamers in PBB's eighth season, titled Pinoy Big Brother: Otso (lit. 'Eight'). The show introduced her as the "Beautiful Bunso-weetie ng Albay". (Note: Translation notes: "Beautiful Bunso-weetie of Albay". In Tagalog, "bunso" refers to the youngest child among siblings. "Bunso-weetie" is a play on the words "bunso" and "sweetie".) The Dreamers were a group of teenage contestants who stayed in a smaller house than the main one occupied by the official housemates. They only appeared in the afternoon broadcast, not in the primetime episodes. On April 13, however, PBB announced that all of the Dreamers would become official housemates and move into the main house.

Gwen was eliminated from the show on May 5. Shortly after her exit from PBB, Lauren Dyogi recruited her for ABS-CBN's Star Hunt Academy (SHA) Program. She trained to become a P-pop idol with the other members of Bini. The group signed a contract with Star Magic in 2021. On June 11, Bini officially debuted with "Born to Win", with Gwen as one of the group's lead vocalists and lead rappers.

Gwen posed for a gothic-themed fashion editorial in the Filipino magazine Parcinq, published on March 18, 2023. Gwen sang "Here With You" with Maloi for the soundtrack of the 2024 Philippine romantic comedy series What's Wrong with Secretary Kim. On August 29, 2025, she was interviewed by Ogie Diaz on his digital talk show Ogie Diaz Inspires. In October, Gwen starred as an audio archivist in the music video for the song "Wasak Na Puso" (lit. 'Shattered Heart') by Six Part Invention.

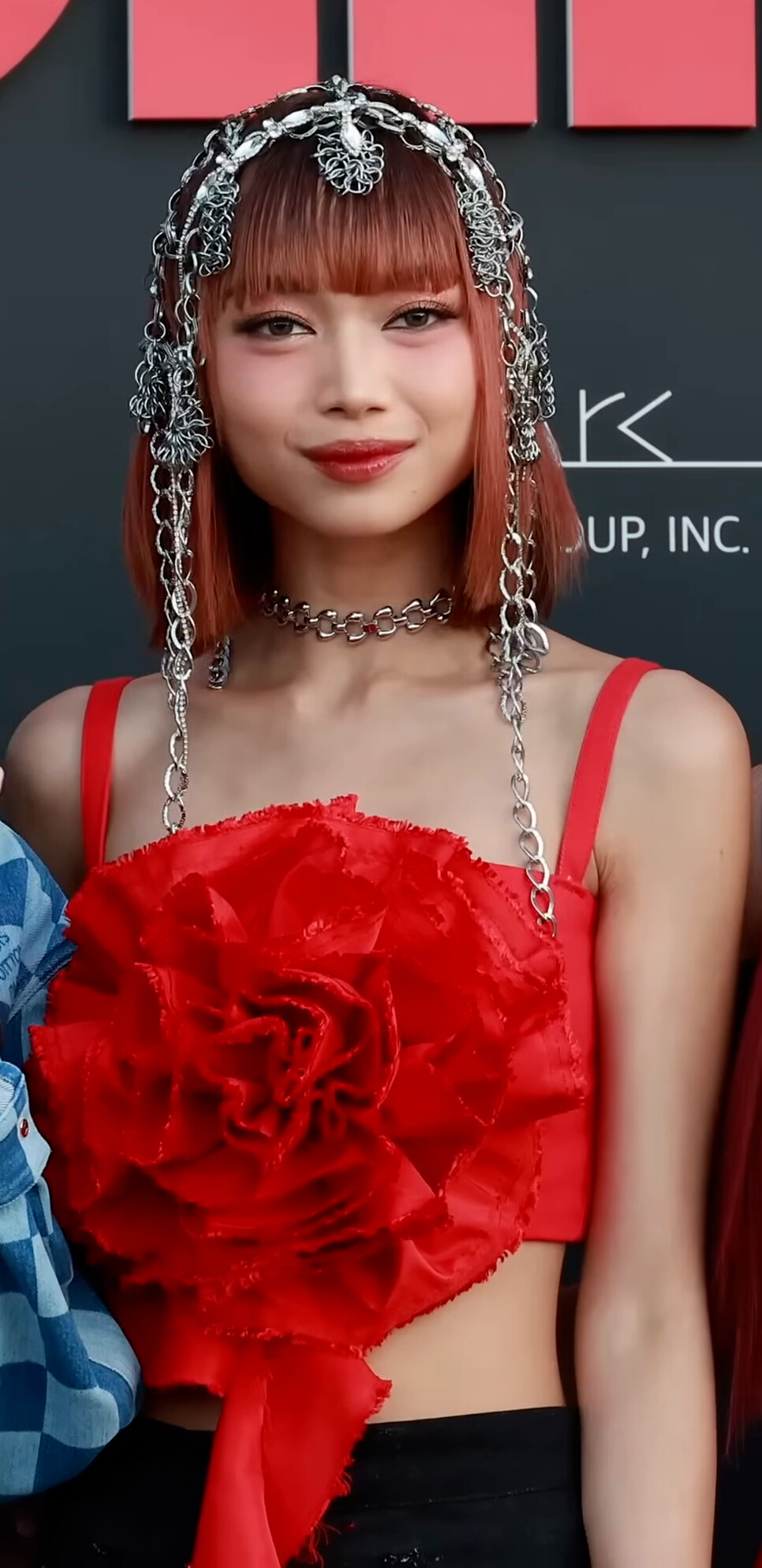
Gwen in August 2024

Since 2024, she has also received considerable media coverage for her makeup skills. She started the "Salamin, Salamin" (lit. 'Mirror, Mirror') makeup trend on TikTok in May and uploaded a video of herself in October applying a makeup look as Pennywise, the antagonist of the 2017 horror film It. In February 2025, she participated in the "Latina makeup" challenge on TikTok. The Daily Tribune's Ann Jenireene Gomez praised Gwen's ability to "effortlessly slay any beauty trend". In October 2025, Gwen posed for a horror-themed photoshoot for Halloween where she did her own hair and styling. In November, the British online magazine &Asian recognized Gwen for her artistry with makeup.

In January 2026, Gwen and fellow Bini member Maloi were nominated for TikTok Face of the Year at the VP Choice Awards.

== Media image ==
Gwen requested that fans not knock on her door to ask for photos in August 2024. Following this incident, Lea Salonga criticised the fans responsible. That October, writer Bianca Custodio observed that Gwen's modeling background was evident in the way she carried herself on the set of her photoshoot with Vogue Philippines. She also identified a bob cut as Gwen's trademark hairstyle. On October 31, 2025, Love at First Spike star Bong Gonzales dressed up as Gwen for Halloween. According to &Asian's Julienne Loreto, this was evidence of Gwen's growing media presence.

After Bini sampled Filipino street food on the People vs. Food YouTube channel in July 2025, she went viral after claiming that she preferred eating turon, one of the country's most beloved street foods, without sugar. The dish comprises thinly sliced bananas wrapped in spring roll wrappers, typically covered in sugar. Jhon Oliver Nery of Manila Bulletin's Agriculture Monthly explained that sugarless turon embodies the cultural history of the singer's home province of Bicol.

== Discography ==
=== As lead artist ===
List of singles, showing year released and associated albums
Title	Year	Album	Ref
"Here With You" (with Maloi Ricalde)	2024	What's Wrong with Secretary Kim Original Soundtrack	

== Filmography ==
=== Television ===
Year	Title	Role	Notes	Ref.
2019	Pinoy Big Brother: Otso	Herself	—	
2025	Maalaala Mo Kaya	Herself	Special participation	

=== Online/digital ===
Year	Title	Role	Notes	Ref.
2025	Ogie Diaz Inspires	Herself	—	

=== Music videos ===
Year	Title	Artist	Ref.
2025	"Wasak Na Puso"	Six Part Invention	

== Awards and nominations ==
Award	Year	Category	Nominee(s)	Result	Ref.
VP Choice Awards	2026	Female TikTok Face of the Year	Gwen	Nominated	

== Listicles ==
Name of publisher, year listed, name of listicle, and placement
Publisher	Year	Listicle	Placement	Ref.
Billboard Philippines	2025	8 Iconic Musicians Who Came from Pinoy Big Brother	Placed	
