= Lorraine Galvez =

Filipino singer and host

Alessandra Lorraine Galves
- Born: San Fernando, La Union
- Education: World Citi Colleges - Quezon City
- Occupations: Singer; Performer; Host
- Years active: 2023–present
- Agent: Polaris - Star Magic

Alessandra Lorraine Galvez is a Filipina singer, nurse, and television host who gained national recognition as a grand finalist in the fifth season of Tawag ng Tanghalan, a singing competition segment on the Philippine variety show It's Showtime. She is also known for her hosting roles on digital platforms and her affiliation with Polaris, the talent management arm of ABS-CBN's Star Magic.

== Early life and education ==
Galvez hails from San Fernando, La Union, Philippines. She pursued a Bachelor of Science in Nursing at World Citi Colleges in Quezon City. In 2022, she was listed among the successful examinees in the Philippine Nurse Licensure Examination. She later obtained her United States Registered Nurse (USRN) license.

== Career ==
=== Singing ===
==== The Voice Teens season 1 ====
Galvez made her television debut on the first season of The Voice Teens Philippines and he performed "Oops!... I Did It Again" by Britney Spears. During her blind audition, both Sarah Geronimo and Sharon Cuneta turned their chairs to her performance and she chose Sharon to be her coach.

Songs performed by Alessandra Galvez on The Voice Teens season 1
Stage	Song	Original artist	Date	Result
Blind Auditions	"Oops!... I Did It Again"	Britney Spears	May 21, 2017	2 chairs turned Sarah Geronimo & Sharon Cuneta (She joined on Team Sharon)
The Battles	"Don't You Worry 'bout a Thing"	Stevie Wonder	June 25, 2017	She won against Ashley Faye Barilea
The Knockouts	"You Give Love a Bad Name"	Bon Jovi	July 8, 2017	She won against Alyssa Grace Datu and Darryl Sevillejo
Live Shows	"The Way We Were"	Barbra Streisand	July 15, 2017	Eliminated because she gained the lowest votes

==== The Clash season 2 ====
After her journey in The Voice Teens on 2017, Galvez joined in the second season of GMA Network singing competition show The Clash.

Songs performed by Alessandra Galvez on The Clash season 2
Stage	Song	Original artist	Date	Result
One on One	"Orange Colored Sky"	Nat King Cole	October 5, 2018	Won
Laban Kung Laban	"Nag-Iisa Na Naman"	KZ Tandingan	October 27, 2018	Won
Pares Kontra Pares	"Never Too Much"	Luther Vandross	November 9, 2018	Won
Isa Laban sa Lahat	"Doo Bi Doo"	Apo Hiking Society	November 16, 2018	Safe
Isa Laban sa Lahat	"Inseparable"	Natalie Cole	November 23, 2018	Bottom 2
Isa Laban sa Lahat	"Toxic"	Britney Spears	November 23, 2018	Eliminated

==== Season 5 ====
Galvez rose to prominence as a contestant in Tawag ng Tanghalan Season 5, where she became one of the Top 8 grand finalists. Her performance of "Spain (I Can Recall)" by Al Jarreau during the grand finals garnered praise from both judges and audiences.

Songs performed by Alessandra Galvez on Tawag ng Tanghalan season 5
Stage	Song	Original artist	Date	Score	Result
Round 1	"Labo"	KZ Tandingan	June 7, 2021	94.7%	Won
Round 2	"Call Me"	Blondie	June 8, 2021	96.3%	Won
Round 2	"Aba Baba Boogie"	Bituin Escalante	June 9, 2021	96%	Won
Round 2	"(If You Can't Sing It) You'll Have to Swing It (Mr. Paganini)"	Ella Fitzgerald	June 10, 2021	95%	Won
Round 2	"Yugyugan Na"	P.O.T.	June 11, 2021	94%	Won
Face-Off Round	"Balut"	Katy de la Cruz	June 12, 2021	96%	Advance
Face-Off Round	"I Never Loved a Man (The Way I Love You)"	Aretha Franklin	June 12, 2021	96.3%	Advance
Quarter-finals	"Time After Time"	Cyndi Lauper	August 6, 2021	93.3%	Advance
Grand finals	"Spain"	Al Jarreau	September 18, 2021	86.00%	Eliminated

==== Duets ====
In this new version of Tawag ng Tanghalan, returning contenders sings but in a duet-style competition, Galvez and Jo Pasaron joined and having a duo name called: "Groove Avenue".

Songs performed by Alessandra Galvez on Tawag ng Tanghalan Duets
Stage	Song	Original artist	Date	Score	Result
Daily Rounds	"I Don't Want to Miss a Thing"	Aerosmith	June 28, 2023	–	Advanced
Weekly Finals	"Believer"	Imagine Dragon	June 30, 2023	97%	Advanced to the Grand Finals
Ang Huling Tapatan (Grand Finals)	"Karakaraka"	Vice Ganda	July 1, 2023	–	Finalist

==== 2022–2023: Spynatics ====
She also have a singing group called Spynatics, a group composed by Galvez, Kier, Jo Pasaron, Aylwina, Russel Solis, Zion Gamez, Joenard Labay and Herk Beato. They have two single titled "Ashes" featuring Katrina Velarde, Louis Tinawi and Emar De Guzman, released on January 28, 2022 and "Pag-Ibig this Christmas", released on December 15, 2023.

=== Hosting and media work ===
Following her stint on Tawag ng Tanghalan, Galvez became a host for Showtime Online Ü, the digital companion show of It's Showtime, The Voice Teens DigiTV, along with her co finalist from Team Sharon Jeremy Glinoga, and PGT Exclusives, the digital companion of Pilipinas Got Talent together with Wize Estabillo. She has also hosted events, such as the Asinan Music and Arts Festival in Pangasinan.

== Personal life ==
In addition to her entertainment career, Galvez maintains her profession as a registered nurse, holding licenses both in the Philippines and the United States.

== Filmography ==
=== Television and web series ===
Year	Title	Role	Ref!
2017	The Voice Teens season 1	Contestant	
2018	The Clash season 2	Contestant	
2021	Tawag ng Tanghalan season 5	Contestant / Grand Finalist	
2021–present	Showtime Online Ü	Host	
2023	Tawag ng Tanghalan: Duets	Contestant / Grand Finalist	
2023	I Can See Your Voice season 5	SING-vestigators	
2024	The Voice Teens season 3	Online Host	
2025	PGT Exclusives	Host	

== Discography ==
=== Single ===
Title	Release date	Composer(s)	Ref(s)
"Hindi Susuko"	October 15, 2020	Simon Tan	
"One Last Chance"	May 27, 2023	Louis Tinawi	
"One Last Chance (reimagined)"	July 11, 2024	Louis Tinawi	
