= Signals (Bini EP) =

- Standard edition cover

EP by Bini
- Released: April 9, 2026
- Studios: Academy of Rock; Studio Z
- Genres: Bubblegum pop; lounge music; hip-hop; new jack swing; pop; R&B; UK garage
- Length: 17:54
- Languages: English; Tagalog; Cebuano
- Label: Star
- Producers: Sweater Beats; Davidior; Jacob Munk; Jeremy Glinoga; Kikx; Lindgren; Moophs; Shintaro Yasuda

Bini chronology
Flames (2025)	Signals (2026)

Singles from Signals
- 1. "Unang Kilig" Released: March 5, 2026

Signals is the third extended play (EP) by Filipino girl group Bini. It was released on April 9, 2026, through Star Music. It consists of six tracks with "Unang Kilig" (Note: Also titled as "Unang Kilig / Honey Honey".) released as single. The EP has been described as incorporating elements of bubblegum, lounge music, hip-hop, new jack swing, pop, R&B, and UK garage, with punk rock and funk influences in a few tracks. Lyrically, the tracks explore the idea that love takes many forms and is expressed through moments and connections. It was recorded at Academy of Rock, a music school in Quezon City, and Studio Z, also located in the same city. It was produced by Andrew Cuna/Sweater Beats, Davidior, Jacob Munk, Jeremy Glinoga, Kiko "Kikx" Salazar, Michel "Lindgren" Schulz, Christopher "Moophs" Lopez, and Shintaro Yasuda.

== Background and release ==
On February 14, 2026, Valentine's Day, Bini held an event titled Kiligan Fest at the Midtown Atrium of Robinsons Manila. The show was exclusive to 88 Blooms who signed up for the event. During the event, Bini announced their song "Unang Kilig" (transl. First Kilig). Star Music released it on March 5, 2026, alongside its B-side "Honey Honey", a surprise release under the distribution of The Orchard.

On March 21, 2026, Bini also held a send-off event at Market! Market! in Taguig, drawing around 15,800 fans, and also announcing two concerts scheduled for Bini's fifth anniversary, titled "Signals" for June and July 2026, at the SM Mall of Asia Arena and SM Arena Seaside Cebu. An upcoming EP with the same name was also announced. Both "Unang Kilig" and "Honey Honey" would be included in the EP Signals.

On April 12, 2026, after the group's Coachella debut performance on the first weekend, Bini would embark on their international concert tour, named after the EP. The group's second world tour will commence at the SM Mall of Asia Arena on June 20 and 21, followed by SM Seaside Cebu Arena on July 11, and will span across multiple countries such as the United States, Canada, the Netherlands, Italy, France, the United Kingdom, Switzerland, Germany, Singapore, and Taiwan.

== Composition and lyrics ==
The EP includes the previously released tracks "Unang Kilig" and "Honey Honey", along with four additional tracks: "Blush", "Tic Tac Toe", "Sugar Rush", and "Step Back". "Unang Kilig" has been described as a retro pop song that explores the uncertainty and excitement of early stage romance. "Honey Honey" is a bubblegum and UK garage track that centers on themes of quiet devotion in a romantic relationship. It also explores the idea that love takes many forms and is expressed through moments and connections. Each track represents a different aspect of love from the initial spark of self confidence and self expression.

"Blush" has been described as a lounge-influenced track featuring tropical drums and a melismatic hook. "Tic Tac Toe" incorporates flirty lyrics, soft vocals, and a "stylish" beat reminiscent of pop hits from the early 2010s. Critics also noted the use of 808 bass machines in the song, adding a hint of hip-hop to the song. "Sugar Rush" has been identified as new jack swing, with a punk rock influence. "Step Back" features assertive lyrics alongside chant-driven sections and instrumentation, earning comparisons to songs of Jennifer Lopez and The Pussycat Dolls, as well as "Hollaback Girl" by Gwen Stefani.The track has also been described as a "sultry" hip-hop song with funk elements, as well as R&B-pop.

Mark Stefanos of LA Weekly called Signals a bilingual project that moves "seamlessly" between English and Tagalog lyrics. However, "Blush" contains a Cebuano word, "kalami" (so nice), which is repeated several times. "Blush", "Honey Honey", and "Tic Tac Toe" were recorded at the Academy of Rock, a music school in Quezon City. "Unang Kilig" and "Sugar Rush" were recorded in Studio Z, also in Quezon City.

== Reception ==
Professional ratings
Review scores
Source	Rating
Kasing2	5/5 stars

Signals received critical acclaim. Mega's Rafael Bautista wrote that it may be Bini's most cohesive record to date. Samantha Radaza of Kasing2 gave the album five stars out of five, saying that the EP represents Bini in a self-assured and experimental stage, while reinforcing their musical identity.

Jade Diones and Quinn Huang of Envi Media described the record as an evolution of Bini's sound, praising its themes of joy, love, and feminine confidence. Julienne Loreto of Positively Filipino believed that the EP did not introduce new sounds for the group, but lauded it for being "packed" with "irresistible" melodies. They commended "Unang Kilig" for its structured songwriting, crediting producer Jeremy Glinoga for the song's quality. They also singled out "Sugar Rush" as possibly one of the best tracks in Bini's career.

== Accolades ==
Award	Year	Category	Result	Ref.
Filipino Music Awards	2026	Album of the Year	Won	

== Track listing ==
Signals track listing
No.	Title	Writer(s)	Producer(s)	Length
1.	"Blush"	Sweater Beats; Christina Alyena Kocher; Moophs; Vincent M. Nantes	Lindgren; Shintaro Yasuda	3:15
2.	"Unang Kilig"	Jeremy Glinoga	Glinoga	3:37
3.	"Honey Honey"	Jacob Munk; Pontus Kalm; Greg Shilling; Melanie Fontana; Khimo Gumatay	Jacob Munk; Pontus Kalm	2:38
4.	"Tic Tac Toe"	Alma Goodman; Gaby Ramirez; Davidior; Yasuda; Trisha Denise	Davidior; Yasuda	3:02
5.	"Sugar Rush"	Derick Gernale; Francis Louie Salazar	Kikx	3:28
6.	"Step Back"	Sweater Beats; Kocher; Moophs; Nantes	Sweater Beats; Moophs	3:04
Total length:				17:54
