= The Voice Teens (Philippine TV series) season 3 =

The Voice Teens
- Season 3
- Promotional poster
- Hosted by: Robi Domingo; Bianca Gonzalez
- Coaches: Bamboo Mañalac; KZ Tandingan; Martin Nievera
- No. of contestants: 63
- Winner: Jillian Pamat
- Runners-up: Steph Lacuata (1st runner-up); Yen Victoria (2nd runner-up)
- Companion show: The Voice Teens DigiTV (Digital)
- No. of episodes: 27

Release
- Original network: Kapamilya Channel (Note: The show also airs on A2Z, Kapamilya Online Live and TV5.)
- Original release: February 17 – May 19, 2024

Season chronology
- ← Previous; Season 2

The third season of the Philippine reality singing competition The Voice Teens aired on Kapamilya Channel, A2Z and TV5 from February 17 to May 19, 2024, replacing the third season of Everybody, Sing! and was replaced by What's Wrong with Secretary Kim. The season is hosted by Robi Domingo and Bianca Gonzalez, who debut as presenters in the spin-off. This season's coaching panel consists of Bamboo Mañalac, who returns for his third season, and debuting coaches KZ Tandingan and Martin Nievera, who previously debuted as coaches on the fifth season of The Voice Kids.

With the coaching panel reduced, the season is the first Teens season to feature three coaches. This season also marks as the final season of The Voice franchise in ABS-CBN as the entire franchise is now being transferred to GMA Network.

Jillian Pamat of Kamp Kawayan was named the winner of the competition on the season finale aired on May 19, 2024. Her victory marks Mañalac's first solo and second consecutive win as a coach in the Teens version.

== Overview ==
=== Development ===
On December 15, 2023, during the ABS-CBN Christmas Special, it was announced that The Voice Teens would return for a third season on the Kapamilya Channel as part of its program lineup for the first quarter of 2024. On February 5, 2024, it was announced that the season will premiere on February 17.

=== Auditions ===
The auditions were open for applicants aged 13 to 17. In addition to on-ground auditions held throughout the Philippines, online auditions were also opened from January 15 to 26, 2024.

On-ground auditions of The Voice Teens
Date	Venue	City	Ref.
January 6, 7, 14, and 21, 2024	ABS-CBN Center Road	Quezon City	
January 20, 2024	Starmall EDSA Shaw	Mandaluyong	
January 20, 2024	Xentro Mall Batangas	Batangas City, Batangas	
January 20, 2024	Pacific Mall Lucena	Lucena, Quezon	
January 21, 2024	Vista Mall Bataan	Roman Superhighway, Balanga, Bataan	
January 21, 2024	Pacific Mall Legazpi	Legazpi, Albay	

=== Coaches and presenters ===
The coaches of the third season of The Voice Teens

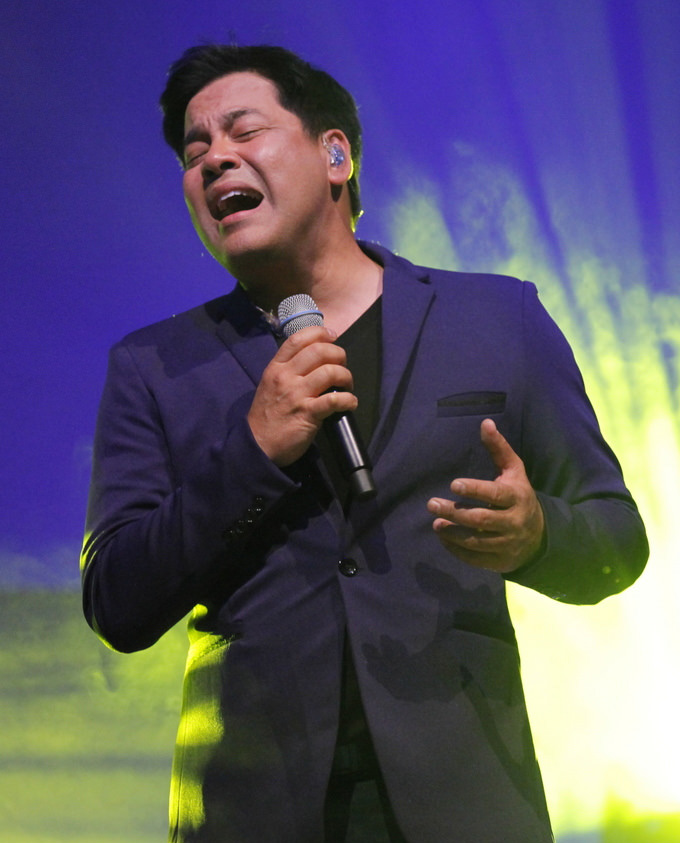
Martin Nievera

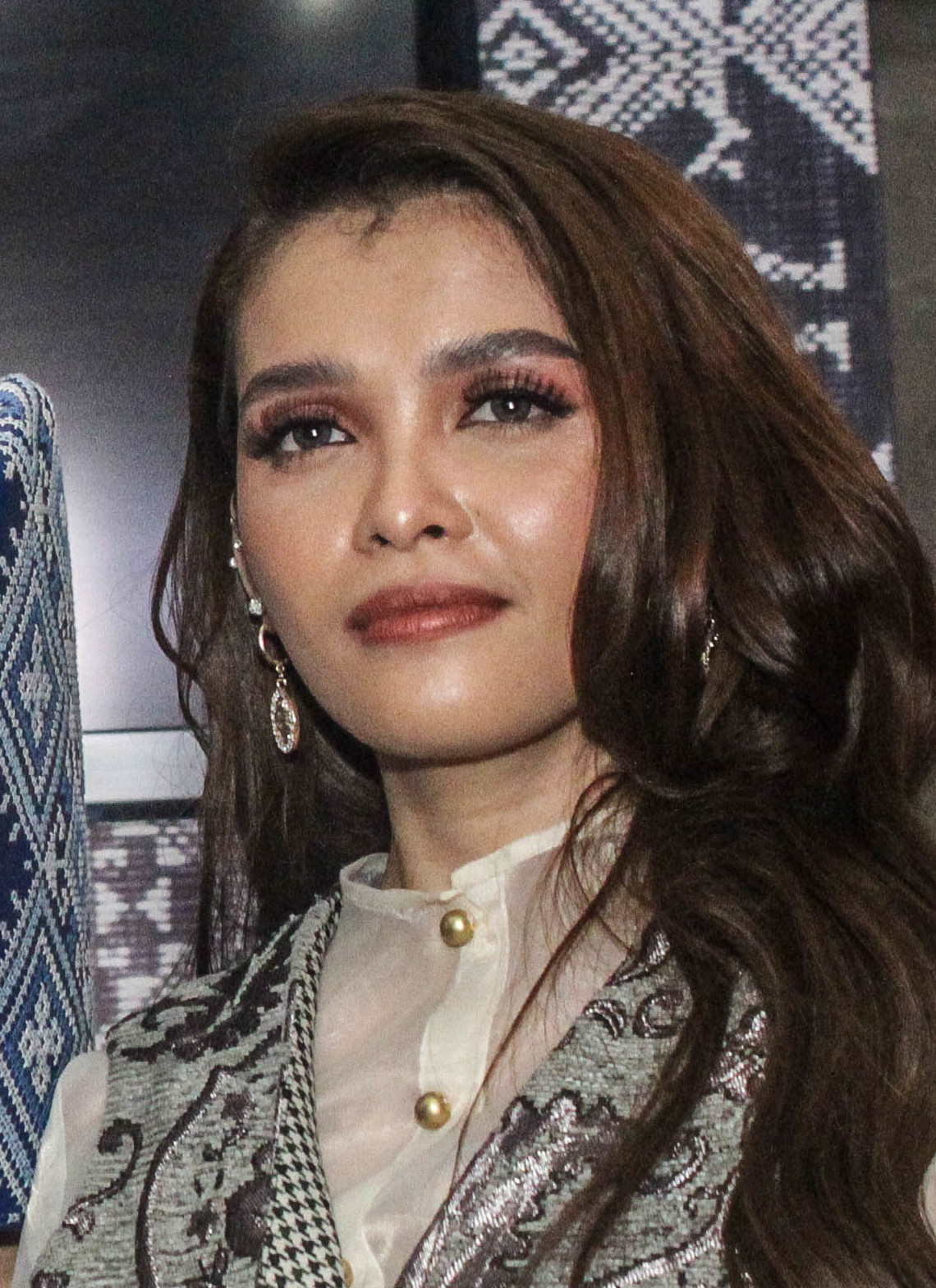
KZ Tandingan

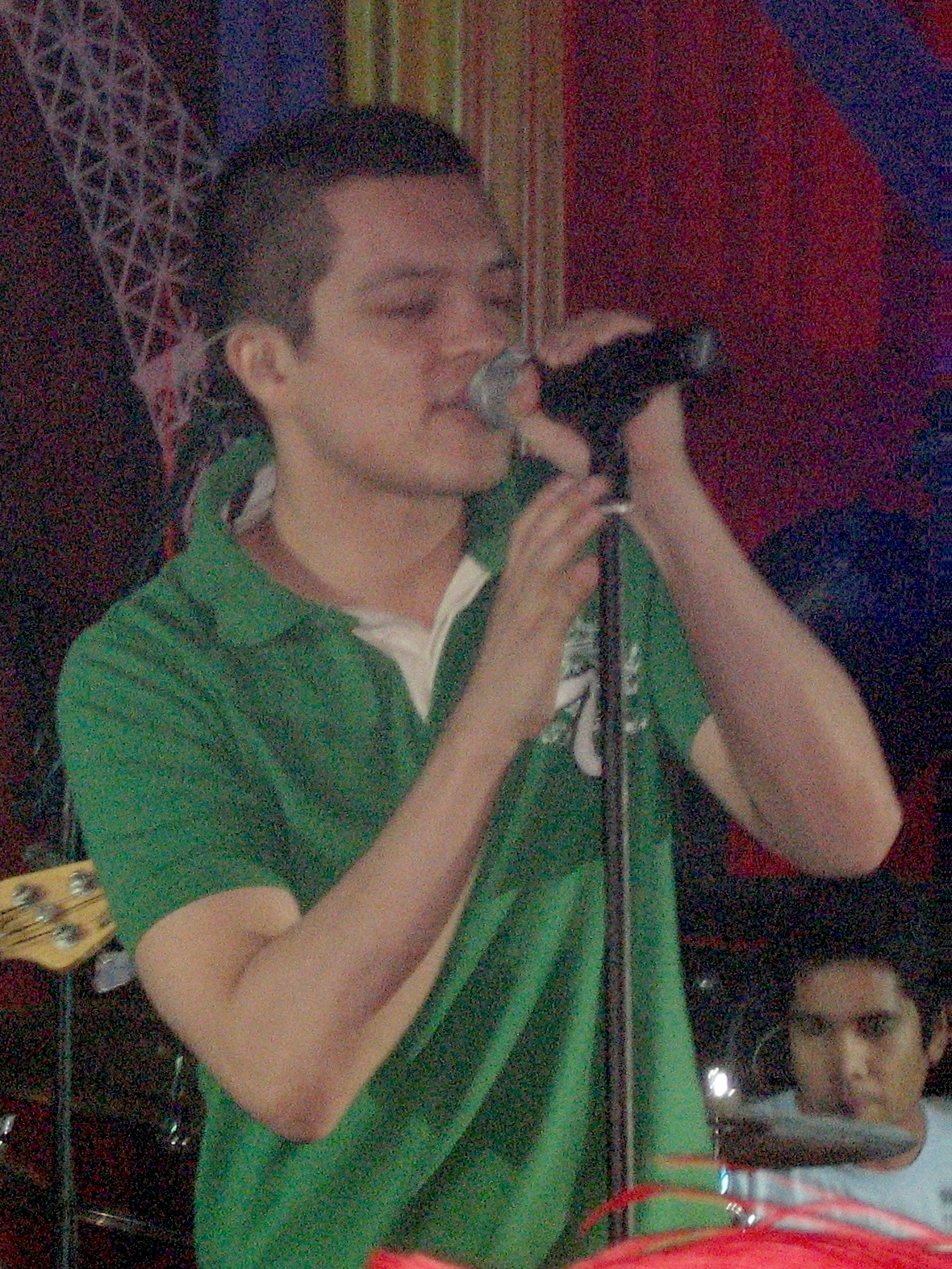
Bamboo Mañalac

Of the four coaches that appeared in the previous season, only Bamboo Mañalac returned as a coach, marking the departure of apl.de.ap, Sarah Geronimo, and Lea Salonga from the judging panel. KZ Tandingan, and Martin Nievera, who debuted as coaches in the fifth season of The Voice Kids, reprise their roles as coaches for the season. With the coaching panel reduced to three, the season is the first to feature a smaller judging panel and the first to feature one female coach.

Robi Domingo and Bianca Gonzalez served as the presenters for the season, reprising their roles from the fifth Kids season, replacing hosts Alex Gonzaga and Luis Manzano. Jeremy Glinoga returned as a presenter for the companion show for his second Teens season and fourth season overall. He is joined by Lorraine Galvez, a contestant from the first season. Glinoga and Galvez are also the backstage hosts during the primetime airing. Isang Manlapaz and Kendra Aguirre, the winners of the previous season, join the companion show as presenters.

== Teams ==
- Winner
- Runner-up
- Third place
- Eliminated in the Live Semi-Finals
- Eliminated in the first Live Shows
- Eliminated in the Knockouts
- Stolen in the Battle rounds
- Eliminated in the Battle rounds

Coaches	Top 63 artists				
Martin Nievera					
Martin Nievera	Steph Lacuata	Colline Salazar	Sofie Pangilinan	Wendy Figura	Benedict Vinluan
Martin Nievera	Gab Bermudez	Failene Malijan	Oxy Dolorito	~~Thor Valiente~~	~~Francine Benitez~~
Martin Nievera	Francine Bendol	Allyana Nicole Magao	Angela Marie Cabela	Mary Kathleen Follero	Mernil Estrera
Martin Nievera	Eros Manalastas	Jireh Sepnio	Cards Españo	Denmar Kianne Corpus	Thenshi Santos
Martin Nievera	Andrea Julian	Elisha Blair Depaula			
KZ Tandingan					
KZ Tandingan	Yen Victoria	Pia Carandang	Bianca Ilagan	Hargie Valirose Ganza	Tiffany Vistal
KZ Tandingan	Thor Valiente	Brianne Caraig	Kiersten Sarmiento	Francheska Empino	Jhamaica Gaviño
KZ Tandingan	Ivo Carlvin Muerong	Justin Reolada	Angel Sophia Laco	Krincess Biala	Hope Sebial
KZ Tandingan	Eliza Mae Comia	Edzel Gorospe	Paulyne Sontosidad	Angelica Palisoc	Pauleen Ignacio
KZ Tandingan	Arvery Love Lagoring	Jocelle Bawiga			
Bamboo Mañalac					
Bamboo Mañalac	Jillian Pamat	Nicole Olivo	Antonette Sison	Maelynn Rapista	Psyryl Leonen
Bamboo Mañalac	Francine Benitez	Violette Sta. Cruz	Elle Manalili	~~Gab Bermudez~~	Allain Gatdula
Bamboo Mañalac	Sabrina Millare	Coffee Charm Mapula	Zara Baningen	Jheizer Vergara	Katleene De Chavez
Bamboo Mañalac	Radhni Tiplan	Chris Cinesiro	Mary Alija Tiglao	Kevin Mirasol	Laurence Dalisay
Bamboo Mañalac	Koleene Miranda	Nathalie Lafuente			
Note: Italicized names are stolen artists (names struck through within former teams).

== Blind auditions ==
The season kicked off with the Blind Auditions on February 17, 2024. In each audition, artists perform while the coaches face away from the stage. If a coach is interested, they press a button to turn their chair. If only one coach turns, the artist automatically joins their team; if multiple turn, the artist chooses. Each coach also has two "blocks" to prevent a rival coach from recruiting a desired artist. By the end of the Blind Auditions, each coach— Nievera (MarTeam), Tandingan (Team Supreme), and Mañalac (Kamp Kawayan)— had 21 artists, with 63 contestants advancing to the Battles.

Blind auditions color key
✔	Coach pressed "I WANT YOU" button
	Artist joined this coach's team
	Artist defaulted to this coach's team
	Artist was eliminated with no coach pressing their button
✘	Coach pressed "I WANT YOU" button, but was blocked by another coach from getting the artist
	Blocked by Martin; Blocked by KZ; Blocked by Bamboo

=== Episode 1 (February 17) ===
First blind audition results
Order	Artist	Age	Hometown	Song	Coach's and artist's choices		
Order	Artist	Age	Hometown	Song	Martin	KZ	Bamboo
1	Andrea Julian	14	Rizal	"I Won't Last a Day Without You"	✔	—	✔
2	Kevin Mirasol	16	Manila	"Buwan"	✔	—	✔
3	Divine Camposano	16	Cavite	"Maging Sino Ka Man"	—	—	—
4	Hope Sebial	13	Talisay, Cebu	"Saan Darating Ang Umaga"	—	✔	—
5	Failene Malijan	15	Santo Tomas, Batangas	"How Could You Say You Love Me"	✔	✔	✔

=== Episode 2 (February 18) ===
Second blind audition results
Order	Artist	Age	Hometown	Song	Coach's and artist's choices		
Order	Artist	Age	Hometown	Song	Martin	KZ	Bamboo
1	Nicole Olivo	15	Laguna	"Dance Monkey"	✔	✔	✔
2	Cards Españo	16	Lucena, Quezon	"Doon Lang"	✔	—	—
3	Laurence Dalisay	15	Batangas City	"Uhaw"	—	✔	✔
4	Leanne Estipona	14	Legazpi, Albay	"Tagu-Taguan"	—	—	—
5	Zara Baningen	14	Antipolo, Rizal	"Ang Buhay Ko"	✔	—	✔

=== Episode 3 (February 24) ===
Third blind audition results
Order	Artist	Age	Hometown	Song	Coach's and artist's choices		
Order	Artist	Age	Hometown	Song	Martin	KZ	Bamboo
1	Colline Salazar	15	Las Piñas	"Katakataka"	✔	✔	—
2	Thor Valiente	17	Quezon City	"Just The Way You Are"	✔	—	—
3	Christine Jalbuena	14	Tanauan, Batangas	"Someone's Always Saying Goodbye"	—	—	—
4	Allain Gatdula	17	Tarlac	"Ikaw at Ako"	✔	—	✔
5	Violette Sta. Cruz	15	Antipolo, Rizal	"Defying Gravity"	✔	✔	✔

=== Episode 4 (February 25) ===
Fourth blind audition results
Order	Artist	Age	Hometown	Song	Coach's and artist's choices		
Order	Artist	Age	Hometown	Song	Martin	KZ	Bamboo
1	Angelica Palisoc	17	San Carlos, Pangasinan	"Orange Colored Sky"	✔	✔	—
2	Renmar Ibe	16	Concepcion, Tarlac	"Bakit Ako Mahihiya?"	—	—	—
3	Coffee Charm Mapula	15	Lingayen, Pangasinan	"I Can"	—	—	✔
4	Denmar Kianne Corpus	15	Cabanatuan, Nueva Ecija	"Nais Ko"	✔	—	—
5	Nathalie LaFuente	16	Meycauayan, Bulacan	"Pasilyo"	✔	✔	✔

=== Episode 5 (March 2) ===
Fifth blind audition results
Order	Artist	Age	Hometown	Song	Coach's and artist's choices		
Order	Artist	Age	Hometown	Song	Martin	KZ	Bamboo
1	Jheizer Vergara	14	Pasig	"Torete"	—	—	✔
2	Jhamaica Gaviño	15	San Pablo, Laguna	"Araw Gabi"	✔	✔	✔
3	Gianna Huelgas	14	San Pablo, Laguna	"Pusong Ligaw"	—	—	—
4	Mernil Estrera	17	Lapu-Lapu City	"Sirena"	✔	✔	—
5	Dwayne Angelo Tablate	17	Meycauayan, Bulacan	"Ere"	—	—	—
6	Benedict Vinluan	17	San Jose, Nueva Ecija	"Binibini"	✔	✔	—

=== Episode 6 (March 3) ===
Sixth blind audition results
Order	Artist	Age	Hometown	Song	Coach's and artist's choices		
Order	Artist	Age	Hometown	Song	Martin	KZ	Bamboo
1	Elisha Blair Depaula	13	Manila	"Ili Ili Tulog Anay"	✔	—	✔
2	Harlei Custodio	17	Dasmariñas, Cavite	"Titibo-Tibo"	—	—	—
3	Bianca Ilagan	17	San Pablo, Laguna	"Para Sa Akin"	—	✔	✔
4	Antonette Sison	16	Batangas City, Batangas	"Tagpuan"	—	✔	✔
5	Wendy Figura	15	Santa Rosa, Laguna	"And I Am Telling You I'm Not Going"	✔	✘	—
6	Ivo Carlvin Muerong	17	La Paz, Tarlac	"Be My Lady"	✔	✔	—

=== Episode 7 (March 9) ===
Seventh blind audition results
Order	Artist	Age	Hometown	Song	Coach's and artist's choices		
Order	Artist	Age	Hometown	Song	Martin	KZ	Bamboo
1	Sofie Pangilinan	15	San Ildefonso, Bulacan	"Rainbow"	✔	—	✔
2	Gleanne Paguia	16	Valenzuela	"Kahit Ayaw Mo Na"	—	—	—
3	Allyana Nicole Magao	17	Parañaque	"Alipin Ako"	✔	—	—
4	Eliza Mae Comia	17	Batangas	"Gaano Ko Ikaw Kamahal"	—	✔	—
5	Steph Lacuata	16	Oriental Mindoro	"Your Love"	✔	✔	—
6	Maelynn Rapista	17	Cabuyao, Laguna	"Pasilyo"	✔	✔	✔

=== Episode 8 (March 10) ===
Eighth blind audition results
Order	Artist	Age	Hometown	Song	Coach's and artist's choices		
Order	Artist	Age	Hometown	Song	Martin	KZ	Bamboo
1	Brianne Caraig	16	Aringay, La Union	"Oo"	✔	✔	✘
2	Don Estomo	17	Cabadbaran, Agusan del Norte	"Hindi Tayo Pwede"	—	—	—
3	Gab Bermudez	17	Pasig	"Kahit Maputi Na Ang Buhok Ko"	✔	—	✔
4	Chris Cinesiro	16	Bohol	"Paubaya"	—	—	✔
5	Princess Martin	15	Laoac, Pangasinan	"Kung Iniibig Ka Niya"	—	—	—
6	Angel Sophia Laco	14	Lipa, Batangas	"Ako Naman Muna"	✔	✔	✔

=== Episode 9 (March 16) ===
Prior to the start of the blind auditions, Bamboo performed "Himala" by Rivermaya.

Ninth blind audition results
Order	Artist	Age	Hometown	Song	Coach's and artist's choices		
Order	Artist	Age	Hometown	Song	Martin	KZ	Bamboo
1	Oxy Dolorito	13	Obando, Bulacan	"Usahay"	✔	✔	✔
2	Francine Benitez	15	Quezon City	"Sundo"	✔	—	—
3	Justin Reolada	17	Santa Cruz, Laguna	"Tila"	—	✔	—
4	Elhyca Ingreso	16	Taguig	"Labo"	—	—	—
5	Edzel Gorospe	17	Subic, Zambales	"Ikaw Lang"	✔	✔	✘

=== Episode 10 (March 17) ===
Tenth blind audition results
Order	Artist	Age	Hometown	Song	Coach's and artist's choices		
Order	Artist	Age	Hometown	Song	Martin	KZ	Bamboo
1	Tiffany Vistal	16	Davao City	"Gusto Ko Nang Bumitaw"	✔	✔	✔
2	Elle Manalili	15	Bacoor, Cavite	"Ili-ili Tulog Anay"	—	—	✔
3	Gab Badillo	14	San Luis, Batangas	"Bakit Ba Ikaw"	—	—	—
4	Thenshi Santos	15	San Jose del Monte, Bulacan	"Raining in Manila"	✔	—	—
5	Arvery Love Lagoring	16	Lamitan City, Basilan	"Paano"	✘	✔	—
6	Jocelle Bawiga	17	Cebu City	"Till My Heartaches End"	✔	✔	✔

=== Episode 11 (March 23) ===
Eleventh blind audition results
Order	Artist	Age	Hometown	Song	Coach's and artist's choices		
Order	Artist	Age	Hometown	Song	Martin	KZ	Bamboo
1	Jillian Pamat	15	Bukidnon	"Di Na Muli"	✔	✔	✔
2	Eros Manalastas	15	San Ildefonso, Bulacan	"Bakit Ba Ikaw"	✔	—	—
3	Sean Pospo	13	Tanza, Cavite	"Isang Lahi"	—	—	—
4	Francheska Empino	17	Pastrana, Leyte	"Till I Met You"	✔	✔	—
5	Topher Dehano	15	Bacoor, Cavite	"When I Met You"	—	—	—
6	Psyryl Leonen	17	Cainta, Rizal	"Binibini"	✘	—	✔

=== Episode 12 (March 24) ===
Twelfth blind audition results
Order	Artist	Age	Hometown	Song	Coach's and artist's choices		
Order	Artist	Age	Hometown	Song	Martin	KZ	Bamboo
1	Paulyne Sontosidad	17	Silay, Negros Occidental	"Pelikula"	✔	✔	✔
2	Jayel Bolor	16	Abra	"Upuan"	—	—	—
3	Iyah Geling	16	Batangas	"Oo"	—	—	—
4	Pauleen Ignacio	16	Santa Rosa, Nueva Ecija	"Tatsulok"	—	✔	—
5	Pia Carandang	16	Batangas	"Saan Darating Ang Umaga"	—	✔	—
6	Sabrina Millare	16	Cabuyao, Laguna	"Ligaya"	✔	✔	✔

=== Episode 13 (March 31) ===
Thirteenth blind audition results
Order	Artist	Age	Hometown	Song	Coach's and artist's choices		
Order	Artist	Age	Hometown	Song	Martin	KZ	Bamboo
1	Hargie Valirose Ganza	16	Calamba, Laguna	"Himala"	✔	✔	—
2	Katleene De Chavez	15	Santo Tomas, Batangas	"Ika'y Mahal Pa Rin"	—	—	✔
3	Angela Marie Cabela	15	Balagtas, Bulacan	"I Can"	✔	—	—
4	Krincess Biala	17	San Antonio, Zambales	"Gaano Ko Ikaw Kamahal"	—	✔	—
5	Kiersten Sarmiento	16	Bulacan	"Tagu-Taguan"	✔	✔	—
6	Lorgen Mae Villanueva	17	Bocaue, Bulacan	"Chasing Pavements"	—	—	—
7	Radhni Tiplan	15	Cabuyao, Laguna	"Demonyo"	—	✘	✔

=== Episode 14 (April 6) ===
Fourteenth blind audition results
Order	Artist	Age	Hometown	Song	Coach's and artist's choices		
Order	Artist	Age	Hometown	Song	Martin	KZ	Bamboo
1	Mary Alija Tiglao	16	San Miguel, Bulacan	"Di Na Muli"	✔	✔	✔
2	Francine Bendol	16	Bacolod	"Babalik Sa'yo"	✔	✔	—
3	Koleene Miranda	17	Batangas	"Para Sa Akin"	✔	—	✔
4	Mary Kathleen Follero	17	Calapan, Oriental Mindoro	"Upuan"	✔	—	Team full
5	Jireh Sepnio	13	Calasiao, Pangasinan	"At Ang Hirap"	✔	—	Team full
6	Chloe Pigar Eliver	15	Negros Occidental	"Natutulog Ba Ang Diyos"	Team full	—	Team full
7	Eunice De Chavez	15	Bacoor, Cavite	"Ako Naman Muna"	Team full	—	Team full
8	Neo Amandy	16	Olongapo	"Ere"	Team full	—	Team full
9	Ysa Mariel Laugo	17	Cabanatuan	"Paubaya"	Team full	—	Team full
10	Yen Victoria	16	Meycauayan, Bulacan	"Pusong Ligaw"	Team full	✔	Team full

== The Battles ==
The Battles began airing on April 7, with 63 artists competing. For the first time, coaches paired three artists per battle, choosing one to advance to the Knockouts. Each coach had one on-stage steal. By the end, each team had eight artists— seven winners and one steal— totaling 24 advancing to the Knockouts.

Color key

Artist was chosen by his/her coach to advance to the Knockouts
Artist was stolen by another coach and advanced to the Knockouts
Artist was eliminated

Battles results
Episode	Coach	Order	Winning Artist	Song	Losing Artists	'Steal' result		
Episode	Coach	Order	Winning Artist	Song	Losing Artists	Martin	KZ	Bamboo
Episode 15 (April 7, 2024)	Martin Nievera	1	Colline Salazar	"I'm in the Mood for Dancing"	Andrea Julian	N/A	—	—
Episode 15 (April 7, 2024)	Martin Nievera	1	Colline Salazar	"I'm in the Mood for Dancing"	Elisha Blair Depaula	N/A	—	—
Episode 15 (April 7, 2024)	KZ Tandingan	2	Hargie Valirose Ganza	"Phoenix"	Arvery Love Lagoring	—	N/A	—
Episode 15 (April 7, 2024)	KZ Tandingan	2	Hargie Valirose Ganza	"Phoenix"	Jocelle Bawiga	—	N/A	—
Episode 15 (April 7, 2024)	Bamboo Mañalac	3	Maelynn Rapista	"Mundo"	Koleene Miranda	—	—	N/A
Episode 15 (April 7, 2024)	Bamboo Mañalac	3	Maelynn Rapista	"Mundo"	Nathalie Lafuente	—	—	N/A
Episode 15 (April 7, 2024)	KZ Tandingan	4	Brianne Caraig	"Marupok"	Angelica Palisoc	—	N/A	—
Episode 15 (April 7, 2024)	KZ Tandingan	4	Brianne Caraig	"Marupok"	Pauleen Ignacio	—	N/A	—
Episode 15 (April 7, 2024)	Martin Nievera	5	Oxy Dolorito	"Can't Help Falling in Love"	Thenshi Santos	N/A	—	—
Episode 15 (April 7, 2024)	Martin Nievera	5	Oxy Dolorito	"Can't Help Falling in Love"	Thor Valiente	N/A	✔	—
Episode 16 (April 13, 2024)	Martin Nievera	1	Benedict Vinluan	"Ayoko Na Sana"	Cards Españo	N/A	Team full	—
Episode 16 (April 13, 2024)	Martin Nievera	1	Benedict Vinluan	"Ayoko Na Sana"	Denmar Kianne Corpus	N/A	Team full	—
Episode 16 (April 13, 2024)	Bamboo Mañalac	2	Elle Manalili	"Tingin"	Kevin Mirasol	—	Team full	N/A
Episode 16 (April 13, 2024)	Bamboo Mañalac	2	Elle Manalili	"Tingin"	Laurence Dalisay	—	Team full	N/A
Episode 16 (April 13, 2024)	KZ Tandingan	3	Tiffany Vistal	"Total Eclipse of the Heart"	Hope Sebial	—	Team full	—
Episode 16 (April 13, 2024)	KZ Tandingan	3	Tiffany Vistal	"Total Eclipse of the Heart"	Eliza Mae Comia	—	Team full	—
Episode 16 (April 13, 2024)	KZ Tandingan	4	Bianca Ilagan	"Kathang-Isip"	Edzel Gorospe	—	Team full	—
Episode 16 (April 13, 2024)	KZ Tandingan	4	Bianca Ilagan	"Kathang-Isip"	Paulyne Sontosidad	—	Team full	—
Episode 16 (April 13, 2024)	Bamboo Mañalac	5	Nicole Olivo	"Pano"	Chris Cinesiro	—	Team full	N/A
Episode 16 (April 13, 2024)	Bamboo Mañalac	5	Nicole Olivo	"Pano"	Mary Alija Tiglao	—	Team full	N/A
Episode 17 (April 14, 2024)	Bamboo Mañalac	1	Violette Sta. Cruz	"Mahika"	Gab Bermudez	✔	Team full	N/A
Episode 17 (April 14, 2024)	Bamboo Mañalac	1	Violette Sta. Cruz	"Mahika"	Radhni Tiplan	Team full	Team full	N/A
Episode 17 (April 14, 2024)	Martin Nievera	2	Steph Lacuata	"Akin Ka Na Lang"	Eros Manalastas	Team full	Team full	—
Episode 17 (April 14, 2024)	Martin Nievera	2	Steph Lacuata	"Akin Ka Na Lang"	Jireh Sepnio	Team full	Team full	—
Episode 17 (April 14, 2024)	Bamboo Mañalac	3	Antonette Sison	"Falling"	Jheizer Vergara	Team full	Team full	N/A
Episode 17 (April 14, 2024)	Bamboo Mañalac	3	Antonette Sison	"Falling"	Katleene De Chavez	Team full	Team full	N/A
Episode 17 (April 14, 2024)	KZ Tandingan	4	Kiersten Sarmiento	"Tanging Dahilan"	Angel Sophia Laco	Team full	Team full	—
Episode 17 (April 14, 2024)	KZ Tandingan	4	Kiersten Sarmiento	"Tanging Dahilan"	Krincess Biala	Team full	Team full	—
Episode 17 (April 14, 2024)	KZ Tandingan	5	Yen Victoria	"Say That You Love Me"	Ivo Carlvin Muerong	Team full	Team full	—
Episode 17 (April 14, 2024)	KZ Tandingan	5	Yen Victoria	"Say That You Love Me"	Justin Reolada	Team full	Team full	—
Episode 17 (April 14, 2024)	Martin Nievera	6	Failene Malijan	"Hanggang Kailan"	Mary Kathleen Follero	Team full	Team full	—
Episode 17 (April 14, 2024)	Martin Nievera	6	Failene Malijan	"Hanggang Kailan"	Mernil Estrera	Team full	Team full	—
Episode 18 (April 20, 2024)	KZ Tandingan	1	Pia Carandang	"Bawat Daan"	Francheska Empino	Team full	Team full	—
Episode 18 (April 20, 2024)	KZ Tandingan	1	Pia Carandang	"Bawat Daan"	Jhamaica Gaviño	Team full	Team full	—
Episode 18 (April 20, 2024)	Bamboo Mañalac	2	Jillian Pamat	"Sabihin"	Coffee Charm Mapula	Team full	Team full	N/A
Episode 18 (April 20, 2024)	Bamboo Mañalac	2	Jillian Pamat	"Sabihin"	Zara Baningen	Team full	Team full	N/A
Episode 18 (April 20, 2024)	Martin Nievera	3	Wendy Figura	"Out Here On My Own"	Allyana Nicole Magao	Team full	Team full	—
Episode 18 (April 20, 2024)	Martin Nievera	3	Wendy Figura	"Out Here On My Own"	Angela Marie Cabela	Team full	Team full	—
Episode 18 (April 20, 2024)	Bamboo Mañalac	4	Psyryl Leonen	"Saan"	Allain Gatdula	Team full	Team full	N/A
Episode 18 (April 20, 2024)	Bamboo Mañalac	4	Psyryl Leonen	"Saan"	Sabrina Millare	Team full	Team full	N/A
Episode 18 (April 20, 2024)	Martin Nievera	5	Sofie Pangilinan	"Bulong"	Francine Bendol	Team full	Team full	—
Episode 18 (April 20, 2024)	Martin Nievera	5	Sofie Pangilinan	"Bulong"	Francine Benitez	Team full	Team full	✔

== The Knockouts ==
The Knockouts, the third stage of the competition, began airing on April 21, featuring 24 artists. For the first time in the show's history, a four-way knockout format was introduced. Each coach divided their team into two groups of four, with only two artists from each group advancing. By the end of the round, each team had four artists moving on to the Live Shows.

Artist was chosen by their coach to advance to the Live Shows
Artist was eliminated

Episode	Coach	Order	Artist	Song	Result
Episode 19 (April 21, 2024)	Martin Nievera	1	Colline Salazar	"Minsan ang Minahal ay Ako"	Advanced
Episode 19 (April 21, 2024)	Martin Nievera	2	Failene Malijan	"Follow Your Dreams"	Eliminated
Episode 19 (April 21, 2024)	Martin Nievera	3	Oxy Dolorito	"Can This Be Love"	Eliminated
Episode 19 (April 21, 2024)	Martin Nievera	4	Wendy Figura	"Kailangan Kita"	Advanced
Episode 19 (April 21, 2024)	Martin Nievera	5	Benedict Vinluan	"Yun Ka"	Eliminated
Episode 19 (April 21, 2024)	Martin Nievera	6	Gab Bermudez	"Tao"	Eliminated
Episode 19 (April 21, 2024)	Martin Nievera	7	Steph Lacuata	"I'll Never Go"	Advanced
Episode 19 (April 21, 2024)	Martin Nievera	8	Sofie Pangilinan	"Ordinary People"	Advanced
Episode 20 (April 27, 2024)	Bamboo Mañalac	1	Violette Sta. Cruz	"Anak Ng Pasig"	Eliminated
Episode 20 (April 27, 2024)	Bamboo Mañalac	2	Elle Manalili	"Sana'y Maulit Muli"	Eliminated
Episode 20 (April 27, 2024)	Bamboo Mañalac	3	Antonette Sison	"Tadhana"	Advanced
Episode 20 (April 27, 2024)	Bamboo Mañalac	4	Jillian Pamat	"Natatawa Ako"	Advanced
Episode 20 (April 27, 2024)	Bamboo Mañalac	5	Maelynn Rapista	"Malaya"	Advanced
Episode 20 (April 27, 2024)	Bamboo Mañalac	6	Nicole Olivo	"Tuwing Umuulan At Kapiling Ka"	Advanced
Episode 20 (April 27, 2024)	Bamboo Mañalac	7	Psyryl Leonen	"Tahanan"	Eliminated
Episode 20 (April 27, 2024)	Bamboo Mañalac	8	Francine Benitez	"214"	Eliminated
Episode 21 (April 28, 2024)	KZ Tandingan	1	Brianne Caraig	"Liwanag Sa Dilim"	Eliminated
Episode 21 (April 28, 2024)	KZ Tandingan	2	Bianca Ilagan	"So Slow"	Advanced
Episode 21 (April 28, 2024)	KZ Tandingan	3	Kiersten Sarmiento	"Nobela"	Eliminated
Episode 21 (April 28, 2024)	KZ Tandingan	4	Hargie Valirose Ganza	"I Am Changing"	Advanced
Episode 21 (April 28, 2024)	KZ Tandingan	5	Thor Valiente	"Tala"	Eliminated
Episode 21 (April 28, 2024)	KZ Tandingan	6	Yen Victoria	"Ang Huling El Bimbo"	Advanced
Episode 21 (April 28, 2024)	KZ Tandingan	7	Tiffany Vistal	"Di Mapaliwanag"	Eliminated
Episode 21 (April 28, 2024)	KZ Tandingan	8	Pia Carandang	"Araw Gabi"	Advanced

== Live shows ==
The Live Shows premiered on May 4, 2024, marking their return after a hiatus in the previous season due to the COVID-19 pandemic. Voting was conducted via joinnow.ph, opening immediately after each team's performance and closing before the next team took the stage.

=== Week 1 (May 4–5) ===
Held at the ABS-CBN Studios, the Top 12 artists competed for public votes to secure a spot in the semifinals. In each team, the artist with the highest number of votes advanced automatically, while coaches selected one more artist from their remaining three to move forward. Team Supreme and MarTeam performed in the first episode, followed by Kamp Kawayan in the next. Results were announced during the Sunday episode.

Color key:

Artist was received the most votes within their team and advanced to the semifinals
Artist was selected by their coach to advance to the semifinals
Artist was eliminated

Live Show Results
Episode	Coach	Order	Artist	Song	Votes	Result
Episode 22 (May 4, 2024)	KZ Tandingan	1	Yen Victoria	"Nosi Balasi"	unrevealed (Note: The remaining teen artists from Team Supreme received 20.20%, 11.80%, and 6.37% of the public votes. However, it was not revealed which teen artist received each percentage.)	KZ's choice
Episode 22 (May 4, 2024)	KZ Tandingan	2	Bianca Ilagan	"Huwag Na Huwag Mong Sasabihin"	unrevealed	Eliminated
Episode 22 (May 4, 2024)	KZ Tandingan	3	Hargie Valirose Ganza	"Luha"	unrevealed	Eliminated
Episode 22 (May 4, 2024)	KZ Tandingan	4	Pia Carandang	"Istorya"	61.63%	Public vote
Episode 22 (May 4, 2024)	Martin Nievera	5	Sofie Pangilinan	"A Song for You"	unrevealed (Note: The remaining teen artists from MarTeam received 19.26%, 13.06%, and 12.80% of the public votes. However, it was not revealed which teen artist received each percentage.)	Eliminated
Episode 22 (May 4, 2024)	Martin Nievera	6	Colline Salazar	"You Raise Me Up"	unrevealed	Martin's choice
Episode 22 (May 4, 2024)	Martin Nievera	7	Steph Lacuata	"Mapa"	54.88%	Public vote
Episode 22 (May 4, 2024)	Martin Nievera	8	Wendy Figura	"Makita Kang Muli"	unrevealed	Eliminated
Episode 23 (May 5, 2024)	Bamboo Mañalac	1	Antonette Sison	"Sign of the Times"	unrevealed (Note: The remaining teen artists from Kamp Kawayan received 17.45%, 14.60%, and 6.85% of the public votes. However, it was not revealed which teen artist received each percentage.)	Eliminated
Episode 23 (May 5, 2024)	Bamboo Mañalac	2	Nicole Olivo	"I Wanna Dance with Somebody (Who Loves Me)"	unrevealed	Bamboo's choice
Episode 23 (May 5, 2024)	Bamboo Mañalac	3	Maelynn Rapista	"Muli"	unrevealed	Eliminated
Episode 23 (May 5, 2024)	Bamboo Mañalac	4	Jillian Pamat	"Kung Ako Na Lang Sana"	61.10%	Public vote

Non-competition performances
Order	Performers	Song
23.1	Morissette	"Dance the Night"

=== Week 2: Semifinals (May 11–12) ===
Held at the ABS-CBN Studios, the Top 6 artists competed for a place in The Final Showdown. Advancement was determined by a 50-50 combination of public votes and coach scores. Each coach had 100 points to split between their two remaining artists, with the artist receiving the highest combined score moving on to the grand finals. Kamp Kawayan and Team Supreme performed in the first episode, followed by MarTeam in the second. Results were revealed during the Sunday episode.

Due to illness, Tandingan was unable to attend in person and participated virtually via video screen throughout the week.

Color key:

Artist received the highest average within their team and advanced to The Final Showdown
Artist was eliminated

Live semifinals results
Episode	Coach	Order	Artist	Song	Scores			Result
Episode	Coach	Order	Artist	Song	Coach	Public	Average	Result
Episode 24 (May 11, 2024)	Bamboo Mañalac	1	Jillian Pamat	"Forevermore"	55.00%	65.60%	60.30%	Advanced
Episode 24 (May 11, 2024)	Bamboo Mañalac	2	Nicole Olivo	"You"	45.00%	34.40%	39.70%	Eliminated
Episode 24 (May 11, 2024)	KZ Tandingan	3	Pia Carandang	"Over the Rainbow"	44.00%	54.72%	49.36%	Eliminated
Episode 24 (May 11, 2024)	KZ Tandingan	4	Yen Victoria	"Buwan"	56.00%	45.28%	50.64%	Advanced
Episode 25 (May 12, 2024)	Martin Nievera	1	Steph Lacuata	"This Is The Moment"	49.00%	69.24%	59.12%	Advanced
Episode 25 (May 12, 2024)	Martin Nievera	2	Colline Salazar	"Lipad Ng Pangarap"	51.00%	30.76%	40.88%	Eliminated

Non-competition performances
Order	Performers	Song
25.1	Kyle Echarri	"Standing Next to You"

=== Week 3: The Final Showdown (May 18–19) ===
The live finale aired from May 18 to 19, featuring three finalists from each team. Before the final showdown, artists drew envelopes from a fishbowl to determine the performance order. Voting was divided into two periods, with the first closing at midnight on Sunday. The artist with the highest combined votes from both periods was crowned the winner.

Jillian Pamat took the title, securing Bamboo Mañalac’s second consecutive and fourth overall coaching victory. Notably, Steph Lacuata became the second consecutive comeback artist to finish as runner-up, following Kate Campo from The Voice Teens Season 2.

This season also marked Bamboo Mañalac’s final appearance as a coach across all Philippine The Voice editions, concluding a remarkable 10-season run as the franchise’s only coach present since its inception.

Color Key

Artist was proclaimed as the winner
Artist ended as the runner-up
Artist ended as the third placer

Finale results
Coach	Artist	Episode 26 (May 18, 2024)				Episode 27 (May 19, 2024)		Votes	Result
Coach	Artist	Order	Duet With Coach	Order	Upbeat Showstopper	Order	Power Ballad	Votes	Result
KZ Tandingan	Yen Victoria	1	"All by Myself"	5	"Time In"	1	"Iris"	21.91%	Third place
Martin Nievera	Steph Lacuata	2	"Ikaw Ang Pangarap"	4	"Mangarap Ka"	3	"Hindi Tayo Pwede"	24.99%	Runner-up
Bamboo Mañalac	Jillian Pamat	3	"Tatsulok"	6	"Ikot-Ikot"	2	"Tag-Ulan"	53.09%	Winner

Non-competition performances
Order	Performers	Song
27.1	Coaches and the Top 12	"Beautiful Day"

== Elimination table ==
Color key

Results color key
Winner	Saved by the public
Runner-up	Saved by their coach
Third place	Artist was saved after receiving the highest accumulated points
	Eliminated

Coaches color key
MarTeam
Team Supreme
Kamp Kawayan

=== Overall ===
Live show results per week
Artist	Week 1	Week 2	Week 3
Jillian Pamat	Safe	Safe	Winner
Steph Lacuata	Safe	Safe	Runner-Up
Yen Victoria	Safe	Safe	Third Place
Pia Carandang	Safe	Eliminated	Eliminated (Week 2)
Nicole Olivo	Safe	Eliminated	Eliminated (Week 2)
Colline Salazar	Safe	Eliminated	Eliminated (Week 2)
Wendy Figura	Eliminated	Eliminated (Week 1)	
Hargie Valirose Ganza	Eliminated	Eliminated (Week 1)	
Bianca Ilagan	Eliminated	Eliminated (Week 1)	
Sofie Pangilinan	Eliminated	Eliminated (Week 1)	
Maelynn Rapista	Eliminated	Eliminated (Week 1)	
Antonette Sison	Eliminated	Eliminated (Week 1)	

=== Per Team ===
Live show results per team
Artist	Week 1	Week 2	Week 3
Steph Lacuata	Public Vote	Advanced	Runner-up
Colline Salazar	Coach's Choice	Eliminated	
Wendy Figura	Eliminated		
Sofie Pangilinan	Eliminated		
Yen Victoria	Coach's Choice	Advanced	Third place
Pia Carandang	Public Vote	Eliminated	
Hargie Valirose Ganza	Eliminated		
Bianca Ilagan	Eliminated		
Jillian Pamat	Public Vote	Advanced	Winner
Nicole Olivo	Coach's Choice	Eliminated	
Maelynn Rapista	Eliminated		
Antonette Sison	Eliminated		
