= Unang Kilig =

Single by Bini

from the EP Signals
- Language: English; Tagalog
- English title: First Kilig
- B-side: "Honey Honey"
- Released: March 5, 2026
- Studio: Studio Z
- Genre: Bubblegum pop; city pop; R&B
- Length: 3:37
- Label: Star
- Songwriter: Jeremy G
- Producer: Jeremy G

Bini singles chronology
| "Paruparo" (2025) | "Unang Kilig" and "Honey Honey" (2026) |

Music video
- "Unang Kilig" on YouTube

"Unang Kilig" (transl. First Kilig; also titled as "Unang Kilig / Honey Honey") is a song by the Filipino girl group Bini. It was released on March 5, 2026, through Star Music under the distribution of The Orchard, along with the surprise release B-side "Honey Honey". They recorded the song at Studio Z in Quezon City. It was written and produced by Jeremy G. The song has been described as bubblegum pop, city pop, "maximalist" retro pop, and R&B with soul and disco influences. The song's lyrics talk about feeling unsure, yet excited in the first stage of romance. "Unang Kilig" also contains synthesizers and jazzy horns.

Its music video was directed by Amiel Kirby Balagtas and produced by YouMeUs MNL, with sets by Obron Propmaster and Robert Jose. It evokes musical theater and classic teen films, featuring reenactments of various movies by the Filipino film studio Star Cinema. The song received acclaim from music critics and received a nomination for Best Asian Pop Music Performance at the 69th Annual Grammy Awards.

== Background and release ==
On February 6, 2026, Bini performed "Halukay Ube" (transl. Ube Mash), originally by the Filipino girl group SexBomb Girls during their reunion concert at the Mall of Asia Arena. They performed two songs by Bini, "Salamin, Salamin" (lit. 'Mirror, Mirror') and "Pantropiko" (lit. 'Tropical'). On February 9, the girl group appeared at the Wonderful Moments Music Festival held at the SMDC Festival Grounds in Parañaque City. During the festival, they performed "Bikini", "Lagi" (lit. 'Always'), and "Salamin, Salamin".

On February 14, Valentine's Day, Bini held an event titled Kiligan Fest at the Midtown Atrium of Robinsons Manila. The show was exclusive to 88 Blooms who signed up for the event. During the event, Bini announced their song "Unang Kilig" (transl. First Kilig). Star Music released the song on March 5, 2026, alongside its B-side "Honey Honey", a surprise release under the distribution of The Orchard.

== Composition ==
"Unang Kilig"
A 14-second sample of the song's chorus, which blends of bubblegum pop and city pop.

"Unang Kilig" was written and produced by Jeremy G. The song has been described as an upbeat bubblegum pop and city pop song, as well as a "maximalist" retro pop song. Andros Resurreccion and Julienne Loreto of &Asian both argued that the track is not truly bubblegum. Resurreccion described it as city pop and R&B, comparing it to 1980s and 1990s songs, as well as the music of American singer Janet Jackson; Loreto added that "Unang Kilig" is influenced by retro soul, pop, and disco. The song also contains synthesizers and jazzy horns.

Written in Tagalog, the song's lyrics are about feeling unsure, yet excited in the first stage of romance. In an interview with 1883 Magazine, Jhoanna, the leader of the girl group explained that "Unang Kilig" derived from the word kilig, refers to the initial stage of being in love. She described it as the most exciting feeling and said they were most comfortable performing in the genre.

== Reception ==
=== Critical reception ===
Gabriel Saulog of Billboard Philippines described "Unang Kilig" as "pure pop joy" and an embodiment of Bini at their best. Bandwagon Asia's Sharvamaya Mohan wrote that the song and its companion track "Honey Honey" reinforce the band's identity as one of the leading figures within the Pinoy pop music industry.

&Asian's Andros Resurreccion and Julienne Loreto both gave the song a positive review. Resurreccion called the song a "wonderful representation of P-pop". In particular, he praised the bridge sung by Aiah and Colet, as well as the final chorus sung by Jhoanna and Stacey. Loreto commended Jeremy G's "sophisticated" production for sounding "fresh" despite the retro influences, as well as highlighting each member's individual vocal tone, especially the high note by Colet. Rolling Stone Philippines' Elijah Pareño praised the song's "clear" hook and emphasis on melody.

The track was included in Billboard Philippines' curated "7 New Songs To Listen To This Week" list, as well as Rolling Stone Philippines' weekly "Songs You Need to Know" list.

== Music video ==
The music video for "Unang Kilig" was directed by Amiel Kirby Balagtas and produced by YouMeUs MNL. It was filmed at the Dolphy Theater before the venue was sold to Ayala Land, Inc. in early 2026. Its sets were designed by Obron Propmaster and Robert Jose, who also worked on the music video for Bini's 2024 single "Cherry on Top". The video depicts the Bini members as actresses auditioning for starring roles in a musical. It also features reenactments of Star Cinema films such as She's Dating the Gangster, Labs Kita... Okey Ka Lang? (transl. I Love You... Are You Okay?), Love You to the Stars and Back, and I Love You, Hater.

The music video has been described as evoking musical theater, as well as classic teen films. It featured a cast including Charo Santos-Concio, Cathy Garcia-Sampana, Olivia Lamasan, Vhong Navarro, Richard Gutierrez, Gerald Anderson, and Ogie Diaz. Additionally, Andros Resurreccion of &Asian wrote that the music video was reminiscent of High School Musical. At the end, Sheena imitates a viral pose by the Filipino actor Alden Richards in a parody of the MGM Lion logo. She also created the choreography. Jefferson Fernando of the Daily Tribune praised the video for its "charming" storytelling. He added that the presence of prestigious figures in the entertainment industry such as Santos-Concio make the video more memorable.

== Track listing ==
| No. | Title | Writer(s) | Producer(s) | Length |
|---|---|---|---|---|
| 1. | "Unang Kilig" | Jeremy G | Jeremy G | 3:37 |
| 2. | "Honey Honey" | Greg Shilling; Jacob Munk; Khimo Gumatay; Melanie Fontana; Pontus Kalm | Munk; Kalm | 3:00 |

== Personnel ==
Credits are adapted from Tidal, with additional information from an &Asian article.

- Bini – vocals
- ABS-CBN Film Productions – music publisher
- Anna Achacoso-Graham – vocal arrangement
- Chris "Moophs" Lopez – A&R administrator
- Darren Cashwell – mixing engineer
- Jeremy G – production, composition, recording, musical arrangement, vocal arrangement, and vocal production
- Leon Zervos – mastering engineer
- Rich Travali – surround mixing engineer
- Studio Z – recording studio
- Tommy Katigbak – musical arrangement
- Theo Martel – musical arrangement
- Daydream Studio – mixing studio

== Accolades ==
| Award | Year | Category | Result | Ref. |
|---|---|---|---|---|
| Filipino Music Awards | 2026 | Pop Song of the Year | Nominated | |
| Grammy Awards | 2027 | Best Asian Pop Music Performance | Pending | |
