= Little Big Shots (Philippine TV series) =

- Genre: Talent show
- Created by: Steve Harvey; Ellen DeGeneres
- Presented by: Billy Crawford
- Country of origin: Philippines
- Original language: Filipino
- No. of seasons: 1
- No. of episodes: 42

Production
- Running time: 45 minutes
- Production companies: ABS-CBN Studios; Warner Bros. International Television Production; A Very Good Production

Original release
- Network: ABS-CBN
- Release: August 12 – December 31, 2017

Little Big Shots is a Philippine variety television series broadcast by ABS-CBN. It aired from August 12 to December 31, 2017, replacing the first season of The Voice Teens and was replaced by the sixth season of Pilipinas Got Talent. It is an adaptation of the hit American TV show Little Big Shots shown on NBC, created by Ellen DeGeneres and Steve Harvey who was also the host of the original. The show is hosted by Billy Crawford. The show features children aged 3 to 13 demonstrating various talents and engaging in conversation with Crawford.

== Format ==
The show, unlike other talent shows like Got Talent, has no judges, winners or losers. In each episode, Billy Crawford talks to a 3- to 13-year-old child about their talent, before performing it in front of a studio audience. Some talents shown in the show include singing, dancing, arts, sports, martial arts, academics, and gymnastics.
