= Honey Honey (Bini song) =

Song by Bini

from the EP Signals
- Language: English; Tagalog
- Released: March 5, 2026
- Studio: Academy of Rock
- Genre: Bubblegum pop
- Length: 2:38
- Label: Star
- Composers: Jacob Munk; Pontus Kalm; Greg Shilling; Melanie Fontana; Khimo Gumatay
- Producers: Jacob Munk; Pontus Kalm

Music video
- "Honey Honey" on YouTube

"Honey Honey" is a song by the Filipino girl group Bini. It was released as a surprise B-side to the single "Unang Kilig" (transl. First Kilig) on March 5, 2026. "Honey Honey" has been described as a bubblegum pop song with breakbeat instrumentals, reminiscent of PinkPantheress songs. The track is primarily written in English, with a Taglish rap. The song received moderately positive reviews from music critics.

== Background and release ==
On February 14, 2026, Valentine's Day, Bini held an event titled Kiligan Fest at the Midtown Atrium of Robinsons Manila. At the event, Bini announced their upcoming single "Unang Kilig" (transl. First Kilig). The song was released on March 5, 2026. Without any promotion, the B-side "Honey Honey" was released alongside the lead single.

== Composition and lyrics ==
"Honey Honey" contains a "chill" and "minimalist" groove, "wispy" breakbeat instrumentals, and "high" vocal riffs by the Bini members. Musically, it has been described as soft and sweet. The description on the song's official lyric video claims that the song is infused with hyperpop. Julienne Loreto of &Asian criticized this, explaining that hyper-pop is characterized by "aggressive" beats, which they consider to be "very far from" the song's much lighter, gentler sound. Loreto identified the track as a bubblegum pop song with a similar style to PinkPantheress' music. Likewise, Ghilieah Valeska Tabbada of Pulp described "Honey Honey" as bubblegum, not hyper-pop.

According to Bandwagon Asia's Sharvamaya Mohan, the track's lyrics are about "quiet devotion" towards one's romantic partner. The lyrics are primarily written in English, with a Taglish rap. The track was recorded at the Academy of Rock, a music school in Quezon City, Philippines.

== Reception ==
"Honey Honey" received moderately positive reviews from music critics. Jane Andes of Zeen opined that the track, paired with the lead single "Unang Kilig", demonstrates Bini's range, as the former appeals to Filipino nostalgia while the latter showcases a "smoother, modern pop sound aimed at a wider audience". &Asian's Julienne Loreto called the song "cute" and "catchy", while co-writer Andros Resurreccion believed "Honey Honey" would be a good fit for the band's Coachella debut, though he stated that he did not have much to say about the track. On the other hand, Ghilieah Valeska Tabbada of Pulp preferred "Honey Honey" over "Kilig". She praised the song's "angelic" harmonies, adding that it proves the band's "mastery" at creating Pinoy pop music that appeals to a global audience.

== Music video ==
On March 26, a music video was released for "Honey Honey", showing the Bini members singing along to the track. Bini members Aiah and Mikha's pet dogs made cameos in the video.

== Credits and personnel ==
Credits are adapted from Tidal.

- Bini – vocals
- Greg Shilling – composition, vocal production
- Anna Achacoso-Graham – vocal arrangement
- Jacob Munk – composition
- Khimo Gumatay – composition
- Melanie Fontana – composition
- Chris "Moophs" Lopez – recording
- Dan Naim – mixing
- Leon Zervos – mastering
- Rich Travali – surround mixing
