= Jo Pasaron =

Filipino singer (born 2000)

- Born: May 29, 2000 (age 26)
- Origin: Sta. Rita, Olongapo
- Genres: Pop; Jazz; Ballad; pop rock; Reggae; alternative rock; OPM
- Instrument: Vocals
- Years active: 2017–present

Jomar Ilan Pasaron is a Filipino singer and performer best known for competing in Tawag ng Tanghalan season 5 where he lost in the weekly finals, Tawag ng Tanghalan season 6 where he was a 2-time defending champion in quarter 2 daily rounds, Tawag ng Tanghalan: Duets where he and Lorraine Galvez make it to the finale. And he is also part of Tawag ng Tanghalan: All-Star Grand Resbak season 2.

== Education ==
Jo Pasaron was a board passer and graduated in Bachelor of Science in Medical Laboratory Science at The Manila Times College of Subic. He was able to rehearse and perform in Tawag ng Tanghalan: All-Star Grand Resbak season 2 while reviewing for his board exam.

== Career ==
=== The Voice Teens ===
Pasaron made his television debut on the first season of The Voice Teens Philippines and he performed "Rumour Has It" by Adele. During his blind audition, both Lea Salonga and Sharon Cuneta turned their chairs to his performance. After his performance Sharon Cuneta asked another song for Pasaron and he sang "True Colors" by Cyndi Lauper and the judges were more impressed. Pasaron joined Lea Salonga's team where she called "FamiLea". However, he was eliminated in the battle rounds of the competition.

Songs performed by Jo Pasaron on The Voice Teens season 1
Stage	Song	Original artist	Date	Result
Blind Auditions	"Rumour Has It"	Adele	May 6, 2017	2 chairs turned Lea Salonga & Sharon Cuneta (He joined on Team Lea)
Battles	"Makita Kang Muli"	Sugarfree	June 17, 2017	Lost to Erica Ladiza

=== Tawag ng Tanghalan ===
==== Season 5 ====
After four years Pasaron comesback on the television stage by joining Tawag ng Tanghalan season 5 where he won against Norma Rangasajo by singing "Call Me" by the American new wave band Blondie in the first round of Quarter 1, daily rounds and successfully take the spotlight from Reivienn Bedonia by singing "Beer" by The Itchyworms on the second round. He was able to defend his spotlight until the Face-Off Round where he faced and lost to Reiven Umali.

Songs performed by Jo Pasaron on Tawag ng Tanghalan season 5
Round	Performance Date	Song Performed	Original Artist	Score (%)	Result
Round 1	April 14, 2021	"Call Me"	Blondie	94.3%	Won
Round 2	April 14, 2021	"Beer"	The Itchyworms	89.7%	Won
Round 2	April 15, 2021	"Addicted to You"	Avicii	93.3%	Won
Round 2	April 16, 2021	"Ain't No Sunshine"	Bill Withers	95.7%	Won
Face-Off Round	April 17, 2021	"Kathang Isip"	Ben&Ben	91.0%	Lost
Face-Off Round	April 17, 2021	"Oo"	Up Dharma Down	91.3%	Lost

==== Season 6 ====
He was back on Tawag ng Tanghalan stage to join Tawag ng Tanghalan season 6 where he faced Zeunette Salandanan in the Battle of Versions round singing "River" by Bishop Briggs and they're both advance to Face-Off Round facing Jezza Quiogue, by performing "Usok" by Asin he was able to defeat both Salandanan and Quiogue making him the defending champion. On the second day as a defending champion in the daily rounds, Pasaron performed "Lovefool" by the Cardigans where he was able to defend his title by Jovic Bando. On the third day, Pasaron was defeated by Raven Heyres and he sang "Ang Awit Natin" by Janine Teñoso on their battle. after losing by Heyres, Pasaron was back in the season's Resbakbakan. He performed "Laklak" by Teeth defeating Shamae Mariano in the first round, in the second round he sang "Feeling Good" by Nina Simone making him and Querubin Llavore both advance to the next round. In the last round, Pasaron didn't make it to the "Ultimate Resbakbakan", he sang "Kapangyarihan" by SB19 and was defeated by his three contenders Heyres, Salandanan and Llavore.

Songs performed by Jo Pasaron on Tawag ng Tanghalan season 6 daily rounds
Round	Performance Date	Song Performed	Original Artist	Score (%)	Result
Battle of Versions	June 28, 2022	"River"	Bishop Briggs	–	Won
Face-Off Round	June 28, 2022	"Usok"	Asin	97.3%	Won
Face-Off Round	June 29, 2022	"Lovefool"	The Cardigans	95.3%	Won
Face-Off Round	July 1, 2022	"Ang Awit Natin"	Janine Teñoso	92.3%	~~Lost~~

Songs performed by Jo Pasaron on Tawag ng Tanghalan season 6 Resbakbakan
Round	Performance Date	Song Performed	Original Artist	Score (%)	Result
Round 1	October 18, 2022	"Laklak"	Teeth	96.0%	Advanced
Round 2	October 25, 2022	"Feeling Good"	Nina Simone	94.7%	Advanced
Round 3	October 28, 2022	"Kapangyarihan"	SB19	91.0%	Eliminated

==== Duets ====
On May 8, 2023, a new season of Tawag ng Tanghalan was made, a Tawag ng Tanghalan: Duets it was like an All-Star Grand Resbak but in a duet-style competition. Lorraine Galvez and Jo Pasaron was part of the season as duo, and their duo name is "Groove Avenue". On their daily rounds they won against Antonetthe Tismo and Yvonna Ang (Comedivas), by performing "I Don't Want to Miss a Thing" by Aerosmith and they are able to advance to the next round. The next round is the Weekly Finals they perform on the week 8 of the Weekly Finals where they faced four duo contenders,

- Angel Balbin and Angel Recabo – (The Power Angels)
- Eric Celino and Josh Matias – (Roman-tinig in Tandem)
- Jophil Cece and Rachell Laylo – (Dragonflies Duo)
- CJ Navato and Heart Salvador – (Hopefuls in Tandem)

Groove Avenue won against their four contenders by performing "Believer" by Imagine Dragons and make their duo advance to the finale. In the finale the theme is (solo songs) where Groove Avenue performed Vice Ganda's hit song "Karakaraka", the duo are failed to make it to the final 3 and placed as a finalist in the competition.

Songs performed by Jo Pasaron on Tawag ng Tanghalan: Duets
Round	Performance Date	Song Performed	Original Artist	Score (%)	Result
Daily Rounds	June 28, 2023	"I Don't Want to Miss a Thing"	Aerosmith	–	Daily Winner
Weekly Finals	June 30, 2023	"Believer"	Imagine Dragons	97.0%	Weekly Winner
Ang Huling Tapatan (Grand Finals)	July 1, 2023	"Karakaraka"	Vice Ganda	–	Finalist

==== All-Star Grand Resbak season 2 ====
For his fifth television appearance Pasaron is part of Tawag ng Tanghalan: All-Star Grand Resbak season 2 where he's part of Team "Agimat". The first 2 stage of the competition is a point system where the members of teams gather points by defeating the other teams each day. Pasaron performed second to the last of the Stage 1: Four-Way Face-Off Round and he sang "Radioactive" by Imagine Dragons but was defeated by Dior Lawrence Bronia of team "Amihan". On the last week of the Stage 1 of Four-Way Face-Off Round, team "Amihan" was tie on team "Agimat" with the points of 2 where they did a tie breaker. Each team select a representative to perform in the tie breaker where Marko Rudio of team "Agimat" and Nowi Alpuerto of team "Amihan" performed in (Ultimate Pangkat Tapatan: Tie-Breaker Round). Marko Rudio won in the tie breaker making their team advance to the next round. In the last day of the Stage II: Three-Way Face-Off Round all teams has 4 points making it crucial to all teams. Pasaron, Chin-Chin Abellanosa and Raymundo Alvarez faced each other where Pasaron won in their three-way battle, he performed "Usok" by Asin making their team advance to the next round. April 11, 2025, in the Resbak Battle round, Pasaron faced his teammate Tenten Pesigan and he performed "Himig ng Pag-ibig" by Asin, even though he receives good comments by the judges he was eliminated by receiving a score of 96% by the judges defeated by Pesigan who received a score of 97.3% on their battle. April 12, 2025, Tawag ng Tanghalan announced that they are giving the TNT all star contenders another chance to comeback where the audience have the chance to vote their favorites and the judges to pick their 4 contenders to comeback. April 21, 2025, Tawag ng Tanghalan announced the 8 contenders to comeback and Pasaron Didn't pick by the judges and didn't reach the top 4 spot in the votes where he receives a 1.84% of votes.

Songs performed by Jo Pasaron on Tawag ng Tanghalan: All-Star Grand Resbak season 2
Round	Performance Date	Song Performed	Original Artist	Score (%)	Result
Stage I: Four-Way Face-Off Round	March 21, 2025	"Radioactive"	Imagine Dragons	91.3%	Advanced
Stage II: Three-Way Face-Off Round	April 5, 2025	"Usok"	Asin	97.0%	Won
Stage III: Resbak Battle	April 11, 2025	"Himig ng Pag-ibig"	Asin	96%	Eliminated

=== 2021–2022: Aerolites ===
Pasaron was a member of band called Aerolites, the band formed in COVID-19 pandemic. They released a song titled "Sinayang" where the lyrics was inspired from a poem titled "Bakit Mo Sinayang" by Aaron Arcala Manglicmot. The single was released on 2021 under M.R. Studio. And a single released on 2022 titled "Played It Well".

=== 2022–2023: Spynatics ===
A singing group called Spynatics, a group composed by Pasaron, Lorraine Galvez, Kier, Aylwina, Russel Solis, Zion Gamez, Joenard Labay and Herk Beato. They have two single titled "Ashes" featuring Katrina Velarde, Louis Tinawi and Emar De Guzman released on January 28, 2022 and "Pag-Ibig this Christmas" released on December 15, 2023.

== Discography ==
=== Singles ===
Title	Release date	Composer(s)	Ref(s)
"Minumulto"	July 4, 2024	Zion Gamez	

== Filmography ==
=== Television ===
Year	Title	Role	Network
2017	The Voice Teens Philippines season 1	Himself / Contestant	ABS-CBN
2021	Tawag ng Tanghalan season 5	Himself / Contestant	Kapamilya Channel / A2Z
2023	Tawag ng Tanghalan season 6	Himself / Contestant	Kapamilya Channel / A2Z
2023	Tawag ng Tanghalan: Duets	Himself / Contestant / Grand Finalist	Kapamilya Channel / A2Z / GTV
2025	Tawag ng Tanghalan: All-Star Grand Resbak season 2	Himself / Contestant	Kapamilya Channel / A2Z / ALLTV / GMA Network
