= Jona Soquite =

Filipino singer (born 2003)

- Born: Jona Marie Soquite; April 13, 2003 (age 23); Davao City, Philippines
- Origin: Toril, Davao City, Philippines
- Occupation: Singer
- Instrument: Vocals
- Years active: 2017–present
- Label: Viva

Jona Marie Soquite (born April 13, 2003) is a Filipino singer who won the first season of The Voice Teens at the age of fourteen.

== Life and career ==
Soquite was born on April 13, 2003, at Davao City, Philippines. In her youth, she competed in various singing contests held in her hometown. Her father, Jonathan, who had trained her to sing since the age of seven, recalled that she had auditioned in past seasons of The Voice Kids. Prior to her subsequent win on The Voice Teens, Soquite's family lived by the river, in a situation she described as "dangerous".

=== 2017: The Voice Teens ===
in 2017, Soquite competed in the first season of The Voice Teens. In her Blind audition, she auditioned with the song "Anak ng Pasig" by Smokey Mountain, turning all four chairs with Soquite choosing Sarah Geronimo as her coach.

Performances on The Voice Teens season 1
Round	Song	Original artist	Order	Original air date	Result
Blind Auditions	"Anak Ng Pasig"	Smokey Mountain	4.4	April 20, 2017	All chairs turned; joined Team Sarah
Battle Rounds	"Sana'y Maghintay Ang Walang Hanggan" (vs. Angel Chloe Redondo)	Sharon Cuneta	21.5	June 25, 2017	Saved by Coach
Knockout Rounds	"Stand Up For Love"	Destiny's Child	25.2	July 9, 2017	Saved by Coach
Live Shows (Week 1)	"Symphony"	Clean Bandit	27.1	July 16, 2017	Saved by Coach
Live Semifinals	"The Greatest Love of All"	Whitney Houston	28.2	July 22, 2017	Saved by Coach and Public vote
Live Finale	"Better Days" (Duet with Sarah Geronimo)	Dianne Reeves	30.4	July 29, 2017	Winner
Live Finale	"Just Dance"	Lady Gaga	30.3	July 29, 2017	Winner
Live Finale	"I Believe I Can Fly"	R. Kelly	31.2	July 30, 2017	Winner

In the finale, she was proclaimed as the winner of the season after receiving the most votes to win. In an interview noted by the Philippine Daily Inquirer, Soquite stated that she was aware of the negative comments targeted at her online, and she was happy that she "proven them wrong". Soquite's semi-final performance of Whitney Houston's "The Greatest Love of All" earned her a nomination for the Awit Award for Performance by a New Female Artist.

=== 2017–present: Later activities ===
In 2021, Soquite performed in Viva Records' digital concert titled Arrival: The Next Chapter of OPM. In 2022, Soquite performed at the inauguration of Vice President Sara Duterte, at Davao City.

== Personal Life ==
In 2025, she is married to Ephraim Dabalos.

== Awards and nominations ==
Year	Award	Category	Nominated work	Result	Ref.
2017	Awit Award	Performance by a New Female Artist	"The Greatest Love of All"	Nominated	

Preceded by Joshua Oliveros (The Voice Kids 3)	The Voice of the Philippines; Winner; 2017	Succeeded by Incumbent
Preceded by First	The Voice of the Philippines Teens; Winner; 2017	Succeeded by Kendra Aguirre; Cydel Gabutero; Isang Manlapaz; Heart Salvador
