= Jeremy G =

Filipino singer-songwriter and actor (born 1999)

- Born: Jeremy Eriq Glinoga; September 14, 1999 (age 26); Los Angeles, California
- Occupations: Singer; Songwriter; Dancer; Actor
- Years active: 2017–present
- Website: www.jeremyglinoga.com

Jeremy Eriq Glinoga (born September 14, 1999) is a Filipino musician, host and an actor. He rose to fame when he became a finalist in the first season of the Filipino reality singing competition The Voice Teens in 2017.

== Filmography ==
=== Television/Digital ===
Year	Title	Role	Network	Ref.
2017	The Voice Teens: Season 1	Himself (finalist for Team Sharon)	ABS-CBN	
2017	Gandang Gabi Vice	Himself (guest with Darren Espanto and Bailey May)	ABS-CBN	
2017–present	ASAP	Himself (performer)	ABS-CBN; Kapamilya Channel; A2Z; All TV; TV5	
2018	I Can See Your Voice	Guest artist (with Jona Soquite and Isabela Vinzon)	ABS-CBN	
2020	I Can See Your Voice	Guest artist (with Elha Nympha)	Kapamilya Channel; A2Z	
2021; 2025–2026	Your Face Sounds Familiar: KaFamiliar Online Live	Himself (online host)	Kapamilya Online Live	
2022	I Can See Your Voice	Guest artist (with Kyle Echarri)	Kapamilya Channel; A2Z	
2022	Lyric and Beat	Stevie	iWantTFC	
2022–2023	Pak na Pak!	Co-host	PIE Channel	
2024–present	It's Showtime	Himself (guest hurado/performer)	Kapamilya Channel; A2Z; All TV; GMA Network; GTV	
2024–2025	Rainbow Rumble	Himself (contestant)	Kapamilya Channel; A2Z; All TV; TV5	
2025	Idol Kids Philippines Spotlight	Host	Kapamilya Channel; A2Z; TV5	

=== Music videos ===
Year	Title	Director	Ref.
2023	"Bini"	Karlo Calingao	

== Discography ==
Extended plays
Year	Album	Tracks	Performers	Label	Ref.
2022	maybe forever	who knows	Jeremy G	Star Music	
2022	maybe forever	by your side	Jeremy G	Star Music	
2022	maybe forever	someday	Jeremy G	Star Music	
2022	maybe forever	sunflower	Jeremy G	Star Music	
2022	maybe forever	forever maybe	Jeremy G	Star Music	
2023	Late Night Madness	Dance Baby	Jeremy G	Star Music	
2023	Late Night Madness	BINI	Jeremy G	Star Music	
2023	Late Night Madness	OCD	Jeremy G	Star Music	
2023	Late Night Madness	Pabalik	Jeremy G	Star Music	
2023	Late Night Madness	Aking Anghel	Jeremy G	Star Music	
2023	Late Night Madness	Di Na Tayo Ganun	Jeremy G	Star Music	
2023	Late Night Madness	Wag Mong Sabihin	Jeremy G	Star Music	
2023	Late Night Madness	Sinayang Mo	Jeremy G	Star Music	
2023	Late Night Madness	Moonlight Kisses	Jeremy G	Star Music	

Singles
Year	Title	Album	Label	Ref.
2025	"Parking Lot" (with Darren Cashwell and Chienna Filomeno)		Star Music	
2024	"BINI (Remix)" (with Aiah Arceta)	Late Night Madness	Star Music; StarPop	
2022	"Lyric & Beat" (with Lyric and Beat main cast and Jonathan Manalo)	Lyric and Beat, Vol. 01 (Official Soundtrack)	Star Music; StarPop	
2022	"Life's A Beach" (with Nameless Kids)	Beach Bros (Official Soundtrack)	StarPop	
2022	"Sabay Natin" (with Angela Ken)	Love in 40 Days (Official Soundtrack)	StarPop	
2022	"Sabay Natin"	Love in 40 Days (Official Soundtrack)	StarPop	
2022	"Your Everything" (with Angela Ken)	How To Move On in 30 Days (Official Soundtrack)	Star Music	
2022	"Your Everything"	How To Move On in 30 Days (Official Soundtrack)	Star Music	
2022	"Naroon Ako"	Viral Scandal (Official Soundtrack)	Star Music	
2022	"someday"	maybe forever	StarPop	
2022	"Pag-ibig Na Kaya" (with Zephanie)	Zephanie	Star Music	
2021	"Yakapin ang Pag-asa ng Pasko" (with Fana)	Non-album singles	StarPop	
2021	"Sayaw" (with Kritiko)	Non-album singles		
2021	"Sa 'Yo" - Old School Stripped Remix	Non-album singles		
2020	"Kahit Na Masungit" (with Kyle Echarri)	Himig Handog 11th Edition		
2020	"Ngayong Pasko"	Non-album singles		
2020	"Dito Na Lang"	Non-album singles		
2019	"Perfectly Imperfect" (with Jayda)	Non-album singles		
2019	"Sa 'Yo" (with KIKX)	After Dark (2nd Hour)	Star Music	

=== Songwriting credits ===
Title	Year	Artist	Album	Composer	Lyricist	Ref.
"Unang Kilig"	2026	Bini	Non-album single	No	Yes	

== Awards and nominations ==
Year	Award	Category	Work	Result	Ref.
2020	33rd Awit Awards	Best R&B Recording	"Sa 'Yo"	Won	
2021	12th PMPC Star Awards for Music	Collaboration of the Year (shared with Jayda)	"Perfectly Imperfect"	Nominated	
