= The Voice Teens (Philippine TV series) season 1 =

Season of television series

The Voice Teens
- Season 1
- Hosted by: Luis Manzano; Toni Gonzaga
- Coaches: Lea Salonga; Sarah Geronimo; Bamboo Mañalac; Sharon Cuneta
- Winner: Jona Marie Soquite
- Winning coach: Sarah Geronimo
- Runner-up: Isabela Vinzon
- Finals venue: ABS-CBN Studio 10

Release
- Original network: ABS-CBN
- Original release: April 16 – July 30, 2017

Season chronology
- Next → Season 2

The first season of the Philippine reality singing competition The Voice Teens aired on ABS-CBN from April 16 to July 30, 2017, replacing the first season of Your Face Sounds Familiar Kids and was replaced by Little Big Shots. Lea Salonga, Bamboo Mañalac and Sharon Cuneta, who had appeared in the third season of The Voice Kids returned to the show as coaches; they will also be accompanied by Sarah Geronimo, who had returned to the franchise after a season hiatus. The show is hosted by Toni Gonzaga and Luis Manzano — the two previously teamed up in hosting the second season of The Voice of the Philippines. The show airs every Saturdays 7:15 p.m. (PST) and Sundays at 7:00 p.m. (PST). It originally ran for 60 minutes until I Can Do That concluded, in which the show's run time was extended to 75 minutes. The finale aired on July 30, 2017 with Jona Marie Soquite of Team Sarah as the champion.

== Auditions ==
The ages of the auditionees were from ages 13 to 17 years old.

On-ground auditions of The Voice Teens
Date	Venue	City	Ref.
January 13, 2017	Eastern Visayas State University	Tanauan, Leyte	
January 14, 2017	ABS-CBN Center Road	Quezon City, Metro Manila	
January 14 & 15, 2017	Robinsons Place Tacloban	Tacloban, Leyte	
January 15, 2017	Starmalls Alabang	Muntinlupa, Metro Manila	
January 20, 2017	Laguna University	Santa Cruz, Laguna	
January 28, 2017	Robinsons Place Roxas	Roxas, Capiz	
January 28, 2017	Vista Mall Santa Rosa	Santa Rosa, Laguna	
January 29, 2017	Robinsons Place Jaro	Jaro, Iloilo	
January 29, 2017	Starmall San Jose Del Monte	San Jose Del Monte, Bulacan	
February 4, 2017	Starmall Las Pinas	Las Piñas	
February 4, 2017	KCC Mall of GenSan	General Santos	
February 5, 2017	Starmall Edsa Shaw	Mandaluyong, Metro Manila	

== Teams ==
Color key

- Winner
- Runner-up
- Third place
- Fourth place
- Eliminated in Live Shows
- Eliminated in The Knockouts
- Stolen in the Battle rounds
- Eliminated in the Battle rounds

Coaches	Top 56 artists			
Lea Salonga				
Lea Salonga	Mica Becerro	Chan Millanes	Patricia Luna	Brandon Kail Ungab
Lea Salonga	Julian Juangco	Felipe De Leon	Erica Ladiza	Sophia Ramos
Lea Salonga	Shell Tenedero	~~Christy Lagapa~~	Clark Gamul	Fatima Espiritu
Lea Salonga	Neil Patrick Corporal	Franz Dacanay	Jomar Pasaron	Mia Villaflores
Sarah Geronimo				
Sarah Geronimo	Jona Marie Soquite	Nisha Bedaña	Ivan Navares	Fritzy Eluna
Sarah Geronimo	Andrea Badinas	Fatima Lagueras	Bryan Chong	Gia Gonzales
Sarah Geronimo	Tanya Dawood	~~Sophia Ramos~~	Johann Ramirez	Erika Tenorio
Sarah Geronimo	Archie Aguilar	Mikko Estrada	Genesis Espera	Angel Chloe Redondo
Bamboo Mañalac				
Bamboo Mañalac	Isabela Vinzon	Emarjhun de Guzman	Queenie Ugdiman	Heather Hawkins
Bamboo Mañalac	Carlos Navea	Angelo Go	Jem Macatuno	Patricia Bonilla
Bamboo Mañalac	Bea Muñoz	~~Fritzy Eluna~~	~~Patricia Luna~~	~~Andrea Badinas~~
Bamboo Mañalac	~~Paul Asi Gatdula~~	Jouie Anne Reyes	DJ Caoile	Reign Andrie Ng
Sharon Cuneta				
Sharon Cuneta	Jeremy Glinoga	Christy Lagapa	Alessandra Galvez	Alyssa Grace Datu
Sharon Cuneta	Darryl Sevillejo	Paul Asi Gatdula	Mike Angelo Escutin	Zyra Peralta
Sharon Cuneta	Arisxandra Libantino	~~Patricia Bonilla~~	~~Heather Hawkins~~	Sophia Dalisay
Sharon Cuneta	Kathlene & Arlene Badong	Miko Ruiz	Jules Ashley Go	Ashley Faye Barilea
Note: Italicized names are stolen artists (names struck through within former teams).

== Blind auditions ==
Out of more or less 10,000 aspirants, only 100 teens were able to proceed in the Blind auditions; 56 thereof were able to join one of the teams and advance to The Battles.

Color key

✔	Coach hit his/her "I WANT YOU" button
	Artist defaulted to this coach's team
	Artist elected to join this coach's team
	Artist eliminated with no coach pressing his or her "I WANT YOU" button

=== Episode 1 (April 16) ===
The coaches performed "Next in Line" by AfterImage prior to the start of the Blind auditions.

Order	Artist	Age	Hometown	Song	Coach's and contestant's choices			
Order	Artist	Age	Hometown	Song	Lea	Sarah	Bamboo	Sharon
1	Mikko Estrada	15	Parañaque	"Dahil Sa'yo"	✔	✔	✔	✔
2	Isabela Vinzon	15	Mexico, Pampanga	"Feeling Good"	—	—	✔	✔
3	Neil Patrick Corporal	17	Sampaloc, Manila	"Fly Me to the Moon"	✔	✔	✔	✔
4	Zyra Peralta	16	Cavite City	"Pangarap na Bituin"	—	—	—	✔

=== Episode 2 (April 22) ===
Order	Artist	Age	Hometown	Song	Coach's and contestant's choices			
Order	Artist	Age	Hometown	Song	Lea	Sarah	Bamboo	Sharon
1	Angel Chloe Redondo	15	Calamba, Laguna	"Masterpiece"	✔	✔	✔	✔
2	Roanne Christine Atilano	17	Zamboanga City	"Secret Love Song"	—	—	—	—
3	Paul Asi Gatdula	17	Cavite	"Kisapmata"	—	—	✔	—
4	Mica Becerro	17	Surigao del Norte	"Queen of the Night"	✔	✔	✔	✔

=== Episode 3 (April 23) ===
Order	Artist	Age	Hometown	Song	Coach's and contestant's choices			
Order	Artist	Age	Hometown	Song	Lea	Sarah	Bamboo	Sharon
1	Darryl Sevillejo	15	Valencia, Negros Oriental	"Huwag Ka Lang Mawawala"	✔	—	—	✔
2	Justine Narvios	16	Talisay, Cebu	"Sax"	—	—	—	—
3	Franz Dacanay	17	San Juan	"Right Here Waiting"	✔	✔	—	✔
4	Alyssa Grace Datu	16	Toronto, Canada	"Hanggang"	✔	✔	✔	✔

=== Episode 4 (April 29) ===
Order	Artist	Age	Hometown	Song	Coach's and contestant's choices			
Order	Artist	Age	Hometown	Song	Lea	Sarah	Bamboo	Sharon
1	Jem Macatuno	16	San Fernando, Pampanga	"Mahirap Magmahal ng Syota ng Iba"	✔	—	✔	—
2	Brandon Kail Ungab	17	Tagbilaran, Bohol	"Back at One"	✔	—	—	✔
3	Queenie Ugdiman	14	Iloilo City	"Scared To Death"	—	—	✔	—
4	Jona Marie Soquite	13	Davao City	"Anak ng Pasig"	✔	✔	✔	✔

=== Episode 5 (April 30) ===
Order	Artist	Age	Hometown	Song	Coach's and contestant's choices			
Order	Artist	Age	Hometown	Song	Lea	Sarah	Bamboo	Sharon
1	Sophia Ramos	15	Las Vegas, United States	"Stone Cold"	✔	✔	✔	✔
2	Mike Angelo Escutin	17	Tanza, Cavite	"Invisible"	—	✔	—	✔
3	Erica Ladiza	16	Guagua, Pampanga	"Salamat"	✔	—	—	✔
4	Emarjhun de Guzman	17	Meycauayan, Bulacan	"One Day"	—	✔	✔	✔

=== Episode 6 (May 6) ===
Order	Artist	Age	Hometown	Song	Coach's and contestant's choices			
Order	Artist	Age	Hometown	Song	Lea	Sarah	Bamboo	Sharon
1	Fatima Espiritu	16	Santa Maria, Bulacan	"My Heart Will Go On"	✔	—	—	✔
2	Kathlene and Arlene Badong	15, 15	Alaminos, Laguna	"Ikaw Ay Ako"	—	—	—	✔
3	Jomar Pasaron	16	Olongapo	"Rumour Has It"	✔	—	—	✔
4	Miko Ruiz	17	Pilar, Bataan	"Pusong Ligaw"	—	—	—	✔
5	Gia Gonzales	15	Hong Kong	"Roses"	✔	✔	✔	✔

=== Episode 7 (May 7) ===
Order	Artist	Age	Hometown	Song	Coach's and contestant's choices			
Order	Artist	Age	Hometown	Song	Lea	Sarah	Bamboo	Sharon
1	Fatima Lagueras	16	Cubao, Quezon City	"Runaway Baby"	✔	✔	—	—
2	DJ Caoile	17	Lupao, Nueva Ecija	"I'm Not the Only One"	—	—	✔	—
3	Angelica Salvaña	17	Tanauan, Leyte	"Dance with My Father" (Tagalog Version)	—	—	—	—
4	Felipe De Leon	17	Pavia, Iloilo	"Bilog Na Naman Ang Buwan"	✔	—	—	—
5	Heather Hawkins	15	Makati	"Make You Feel My Love"	✔	✔	✔	✔

=== Episode 8 (May 13) ===
Order	Artist	Age	Hometown	Song	Coach's and contestant's choices			
Order	Artist	Age	Hometown	Song	Lea	Sarah	Bamboo	Sharon
1	Shell Tenedero	16	Taguig	"Kung Ako Na Lang Sana"	✔	—	✔	✔
2	Mia Villaflores	14	Pangasinan	"Will You Still Love Me Tomorrow"	✔	—	—	—
3	Ivan Navares	16	Baybay, Leyte	"In Your Eyes"	✔	✔	—	✔
4	Samantha Asistio	13	Caloocan	"Huwag Ka Nang Umiyak"	—	—	—	—
5	Carlos Navea	17	Cagayan de Oro	"One Dance"	✔	✔	✔	—

=== Episode 9 (May 14) ===
Order	Artist	Age	Hometown	Song	Coach's and contestant's choices			
Order	Artist	Age	Hometown	Song	Lea	Sarah	Bamboo	Sharon
1	Jeremy Glinoga	17	Los Angeles, United States	"Ikaw"	—	✔	—	✔
2	Patricia Bonilla	14	Lucena	"Iingatan Ka"	✔	✔	✔	✔
3	Dayhme Adobas	—	—	"Your Love"	—	—	—	—
4	Andrea Badinas	17	Cebu City	"Feeling Good"	—	✔	✔	—

=== Episode 10 (May 20) ===
Order	Artist	Age	Hometown	Song	Coach's and contestant's choices			
Order	Artist	Age	Hometown	Song	Lea	Sarah	Bamboo	Sharon
1	Genesis Espera	16	Quezon City	"Closer"	—	✔	✔	—
2	Arisxandra Libantino	15	United Kingdom	"Million Reasons"	—	—	—	✔
3	Mitzi Josh Casacop	14	San Pedro, Laguna	"Rather Be"	—	—	—	—
4	Johann Ramirez	13	Cabanatuan	"Fly Me To The Moon"	✔	✔	—	—
5	Chan ~~& Christian~~ Millanes^{a}	N/A	Davao City	"Gayuma"	✔	—	—	—
6	Reign Andrie Ng	17	Quezon City	"What's Up?"	—	✔	✔	—

Note
a. Chan Millanes auditioned together with his brother Christian Millanes. For undisclosed reasons, Lea, the only coach who turned, preferred to have only one member of the pair advance to the next round. The pair decided that Chan would advance.

=== Episode 11 (May 21) ===
Order	Artist	Age	Hometown	Song	Coach's and contestant's choices			
Order	Artist	Age	Hometown	Song	Lea	Sarah	Bamboo	Sharon
1	Alessandra Galvez	16	Cubao, Quezon City	"Oops!... I Did It Again"	—	✔	—	✔
2	Julian Juangco	16	Quezon City	"For Once in My Life"	✔	—	—	—
3	Erika Tenorio	17	Lupao, Nueva Ecija	"I Don't Want to Talk About It"	—	✔	—	—
4	Angelo Go	13	Narvacan, Ilocos Sur	"Tatsulok"	✔	—	✔	—
5	Jovy Cris Battung	16	Cabanatuan, Nueva Ecija	"Habang May Buhay"	—	—	—	—
6	Tanya Dawood	17	Khaitan, Kuwait City	"Fallin'"	—	✔	—	✔

=== Episode 12 (May 27) ===
Order	Artist	Age	Hometown	Song	Coach's and contestant's choices			
Order	Artist	Age	Hometown	Song	Lea	Sarah	Bamboo	Sharon
1	Jorine Dela Cruz	14	Roxas, Capiz	"S2pid Luv"	—	—	—	—
2	Sophia Dalisay	17	Australia	"Roar"	✔	—	—	✔
3	Clark Gamul	17	General Trias, Cavite	"Hataw Na"	✔	—	—	—
4	Jouie Anne Reyes	17	Angono, Rizal	"Anak"	—	—	✔	—
5	Bryan Chong	17	Angeles City	"Kahit Kailan"	—	✔	—	✔

=== Episode 13 (May 28) ===
Order	Artist	Age	Hometown	Song	Coach's and contestant's choices			
Order	Artist	Age	Hometown	Song	Lea	Sarah	Bamboo	Sharon
1	Archie Aguilar	17	Tandang Sora, Quezon City	"One Last Cry"	—	✔	—	✔
2	Patricia Luna	17	Dumaguete	"Angel"	✔	—	✔	—
3	Jules Ashley Go	14	Cebu City	"Stand by Me"	—	—	—	✔
4	Fritzy Eluna	17	Malaybalay, Bukidnon	"Almost Is Never Enough"	✔	—	✔	—
5	CJ De Guzman	14	Mandaluyong	"Say You Won't Let Go"	—	—	—	—
6	Selena Cabusas	17	Mandaluyong	"Can't Help Falling in Love"	—	—	—	—
7	Nisha Bedaña	17	Pasay	"Laserlight"	✔	✔	—	✔

=== Episode 14 (June 3) ===
Order	Artist	Age	Hometown	Song	Coach's and contestant's choices			
Order	Artist	Age	Hometown	Song	Lea	Sarah	Bamboo	Sharon
1	Christy Lagapa	15	Davao City	"Sino Ang Baliw"	✔	Team full	—	✔
2	Michael Ver Comaling	16	Isabel, Leyte	"One Dance"	Team full	Team full	—	—
3	Ashley Faye Barilea	16	Pasay	"Para Sa Akin"	Team full	Team full	✔	✔
4	Janine	—	—	"Pangako Sa'yo"	Team full	Team full	—	Team full
5	Regielyn	—	—	"Ikot-Ikot"	Team full	Team full	—	Team full
6	Denise	—	—	"Black Horse and the Cherry Tree"	Team full	Team full	—	Team full
7	Bianca	—	—	"Thinking Out Loud"	Team full	Team full	—	Team full
8	Bea Muñoz	16	Las Piñas	"Moon River"	Team full	Team full	✔	Team full

== The Battles ==
From June 10 (Episode 16), the show's airtime was extended to 75 minutes instead of the usual 60 due to the then-recently concluded season of I Can Do That.

For The Battles, the coaches had to pair two of their artists to sing in a duet. The coaches then had to select an artist from the pair to advance to the next round. The coaches, for this season were given the power to steal two losing artists from the opposing teams. At the end of this round, seven artists remained on each team with two artists being stolen creating a total of 36 artists (9 on each team) advancing to The Knockouts.

Color key:

Artist won the Battle and advanced to the Knockouts
Artist lost the Battle but was stolen by another coach and advanced to the Knockouts
Artist lost the Battle and was eliminated

Episode	Coach	Order	Winner	Song	Loser	'Steal' result				
Episode	Coach	Order	Winner	Song	Loser	Lea	Sarah	Bamboo	Sharon	
Episode 15 (June 4, 2017)	Sharon Cuneta	1	Darryl Sevillejo	"Got To Believe In Magic"	Sophia Dalisay	—	—	—	N/A	
Episode 15 (June 4, 2017)	Sarah Geronimo	2	Ivan Navares	"One Call Away"	Johann Ramirez	—	—	✔	N/A	—
Episode 15 (June 4, 2017)	Bamboo Mañalac	3	Bea Muñoz	"Dream On"	Fritzy Eluna	—	✔	N/A	—	
Episode 16 (June 10, 2017)	Sarah Geronimo	1	Nisha Bedaña	"Nothing Compares 2 U"	Erika Tenorio	—	N/A	—	—	
Episode 16 (June 10, 2017)	Bamboo Mañalac	2	Jem Macatuno	"Pag-ibig/Masaya"	Jouie Anne Reyes	—	—	N/A	—	
Episode 16 (June 10, 2017)	Lea Salonga	3	Chan Millanes	"In the End"	Clark Gamul	N/A	—	—	—	
Episode 16 (June 10, 2017)	Sharon Cuneta	4	Jeremy Glinoga	"Sana Maulit Muli"	Heather Hawkins	—	—	✔	N/A	
Episode 17 (June 11, 2017)	Sharon Cuneta	1	Arisxandra Libantino	"You"	Kathlene and Arlene Badong	—	—	—	N/A	
Episode 17 (June 11, 2017)	Lea Salonga	2	Shell Tenedero	"Sana Bukas Pa Ang Kahapon"	Fatima Espiritu	N/A	—	—	—	
Episode 17 (June 11, 2017)	Bamboo Mañalac	3	Carlos Navea	"Cold Water"	DJ Caoile	—	—	N/A	—	
Episode 17 (June 11, 2017)	Lea Salonga	4	Mica Becerro	"Ave Maria"	Christy Lagapa	N/A	✔	✔	✔	
Episode 18 (June 17, 2017)	Sharon Cuneta	1	Mike Angelo Escutin	"Perfect"	Miko Ruiz	—	—	—	N/A	
Episode 18 (June 17, 2017)	Sarah Geronimo	2	Tanya Dawood	"Since U Been Gone"	Sophia Ramos	✔	N/A	—	—	
Episode 18 (June 17, 2017)	Lea Salonga	3	Erica Ladiza	"Makita Kang Muli"	Jomar Pasaron	N/A	—	—	—	
Episode 18 (June 17, 2017)	Sarah Geronimo	4	Bryan Chong	"Heaven Knows"	Archie Aguilar	—	N/A	—	—	
Episode 19 (June 18, 2017)	Bamboo Mañalac	1	Queenie Ugdiman	"The Sound of Silence"	Patricia Luna	✔	—	N/A	—	
Episode 19 (June 18, 2017)	Sarah Geronimo	2	Fatima Lagueras	"Ikaw Lamang"	Mikko Estrada	Team full	N/A	—	—	
Episode 19 (June 18, 2017)	Bamboo Mañalac	3	Isabela Vinzon	"Here"	Reign Andrie Ng	Team full	—	N/A	—	
Episode 19 (June 18, 2017)	Sharon Cuneta	4	Alyssa Grace Datu	"Sana'y Wala Nang Wakas"	Patricia Bonilla	Team full	—	✔	N/A	
Episode 20 (June 24, 2017)	Lea Salonga	1	Felipe De Leon	"Killing Me Softly with His Song"	Mia Villaflores	Team full	—	Team full	—	
Episode 20 (June 24, 2017)	Sharon Cuneta	2	Zyra Peralta	"A Very Special Love"	Jules Ashley Go	Team full	—	Team full	N/A	
Episode 20 (June 24, 2017)	Sarah Geronimo	3	Gia Gonzales	"Weak"	Genesis Espera	Team full	N/A	Team full	—	
Episode 20 (June 24, 2017)	Bamboo Mañalac	4	Emarjhun De Guzman	"Hallelujah"	Andrea Badinas	Team full	✔	Team full	—	
Episode 21 (June 25, 2017)	Lea Salonga	1	Julian Juangco	"Treat You Better"	Neil Patrick Corporal	Team full	Team full	Team full	—	
Episode 21 (June 25, 2017)	Sharon Cuneta	2	Alessandra Galvez	"Don't You Worry 'bout a Thing"	Ashley Faye Barilea	Team full	Team full	Team full	N/A	
Episode 21 (June 25, 2017)	Bamboo Mañalac	3	Angelo Go	"Sinta"	Paul Asi Gatdula	Team full	Team full	Team full	✔	
Episode 21 (June 25, 2017)	Lea Salonga	4	Brandon Kail Ungab	"Hiling"	Franz Dacanay	Team full	Team full	Team full	Team full	
Episode 21 (June 25, 2017)	Sarah Geronimo	5	Jona Marie Soquite	"Sana'y Maghintay Ang Walang Hanggan"	Angel Chloe Redondo	Team full	Team full	Team full	Team full	

== The Knockouts ==
The Knockout rounds aired from July 1 to 9, 2017. Artists are grouped into three by their respective coaches where only one artist will win in each group. Each artist gets to pick their song. The top 12 contestants then moved on to the "Live Shows."

Color key:

Artist won the Knockout and advanced to the live shows
Artist lost the Knockout and was eliminated

Episode	Coach	Order	Song	Artists		Song
Episode	Coach	Order	Song	Winner	Losers	Song
Episode 22 (July 1, 2017)	Bamboo Mañalac	1	"Sorry"	Emarjhun De Guzman	Heather Hawkins	"Crazy"
Episode 22 (July 1, 2017)	Bamboo Mañalac	1	"Sorry"	Emarjhun De Guzman	Carlos Navea	"No Diggity"
Episode 22 (July 1, 2017)	Bamboo Mañalac	2	"Ang Huling El Bimbo"	Queenie Ugdiman	Angelo Go	"Ako'y Sa'yo, Ika'y Akin"
Episode 22 (July 1, 2017)	Bamboo Mañalac	2	"Ang Huling El Bimbo"	Queenie Ugdiman	Jem Macatuno	"Sorry Na, Pwede Ba"
Episode 22 (July 1, 2017)	Bamboo Mañalac	3	"Something's Got a Hold on Me"	Isabela Vinzon	Patricia Bonilla	"Climb Ev'ry Mountain"
Episode 22 (July 1, 2017)	Bamboo Mañalac	3	"Something's Got a Hold on Me"	Isabela Vinzon	Bea Muñoz	"All I Ask of You"
Episode 23 (July 2, 2017)	Lea Salonga	1	"Think of Me"	Mica Becerro	Brandon Kail Ungab	"Panalangin"
Episode 23 (July 2, 2017)	Lea Salonga	1	"Think of Me"	Mica Becerro	Shell Tenedero	"Somewhere Out There"
Episode 23 (July 2, 2017)	Lea Salonga	2	"The Last Time"	Chan Millanes	Julian Juangco	"All of Me"
Episode 23 (July 2, 2017)	Lea Salonga	2	"The Last Time"	Chan Millanes	Felipe De Leon	"Usok"
Episode 23 (July 2, 2017)	Lea Salonga	3	"Ang Buhay Ko"	Patricia Luna	Erica Ladiza	"I Have Nothing"
Episode 23 (July 2, 2017)	Lea Salonga	3	"Ang Buhay Ko"	Patricia Luna	Sophia Ramos	"Narito Ako"
Episode 24 (July 8, 2017)	Sharon Cuneta	1	"You Give Love a Bad Name"	Alessandra Galvez	Alyssa Grace Datu	"Don't Cry Out Loud"
Episode 24 (July 8, 2017)	Sharon Cuneta	1	"You Give Love a Bad Name"	Alessandra Galvez	Darryl Sevillejo	"Pagsubok"
Episode 24 (July 8, 2017)	Sharon Cuneta	2	"Jealous"	Jeremy Glinoga	Paul Asi Gatdula	"Drag Me Down"
Episode 24 (July 8, 2017)	Sharon Cuneta	2	"Jealous"	Jeremy Glinoga	Mike Angelo Escutin	"Para Sa'yo"
Episode 24 (July 8, 2017)	Sharon Cuneta	3	"Son of a Preacher Man"	Christy Lagapa	Zyra Peralta	"Counting Stars"
Episode 24 (July 8, 2017)	Sharon Cuneta	3	"Son of a Preacher Man"	Christy Lagapa	Arisxandra Libantino	"Chandelier"
Episode 25 (July 9, 2017)	Sarah Geronimo	1	"Don't Rain on My Parade"	Nisha Bedaña	Fritzy Eluna	"We Found Love"
Episode 25 (July 9, 2017)	Sarah Geronimo	1	"Don't Rain on My Parade"	Nisha Bedaña	Andrea Badinas	"All I Want"
Episode 25 (July 9, 2017)	Sarah Geronimo	2	"Stand Up For Love"	Jona Marie Soquite	Fatima Lagueras	"At Last"
Episode 25 (July 9, 2017)	Sarah Geronimo	2	"Stand Up For Love"	Jona Marie Soquite	Bryan Chong	"Mercy"
Episode 25 (July 9, 2017)	Sarah Geronimo	3	"There's No Easy Way"	Ivan Navares	Gia Gonzales	"Ex's & Oh's"
Episode 25 (July 9, 2017)	Sarah Geronimo	3	"There's No Easy Way"	Ivan Navares	Tanya Dawood	"I Who Have Nothing"

== Live shows ==
The live shows began airing on July 15, 2017. Unlike the previous seasons of The Voice of the Philippines and The Voice Kids, it was held in the ABS-CBN studios at Quezon City instead of the Newport Performing Arts Theater at the Resorts World Manila in Newport City, Pasay.

The public was only allowed to vote once per mobile number per team. New to this season is the online voting through Google Philippines. By typing the keyword Voice Teens Vote in the search box, clickable photos of the artists that had performed for that day will show up in the search results page; one Google account is entitled to one vote per team only.

The first live show followed the voting format of the third season of The Voice Kids. After the performance of the three artists per team, the public got to vote on who should advance to the semifinals. Voting was done during the commercial break and closed once the show goes back. The artist with the highest public votes advanced to the semifinals. Meanwhile, the coach picked the other artist that moved on to the semifinals, similar to the second season of The Voice of the Philippines.

The semifinals featured a scoring system somewhat similar to the second season of The Voice of the Philippines. Following the performance of the two artists per team, the public gets to vote on who should advance to the finals. Voting was done during the commercial break and closed once the show goes back. After all performances of the night, the coaches give their artists a score from 0 to 100 points. The coaches are not allowed to give the same scores to the artists.

The combined average is 50% public votes and 50% coach votes.

=== Week 1 (July 15 & 16) ===
The top eight artists came from the results of the public votes and coach's choice advanced to the semifinals.

The top twelve artists performed on Saturday and Sunday, July 15–16, 2017, with the results at the end of each show.

Episode	Coach	Order	Artist	Song	Result	Refs.
Episode 26 (July 15, 2017)	Lea Salonga	1	Mica Becerro	"Bridge over Troubled Water"	Public's vote	
Episode 26 (July 15, 2017)	Lea Salonga	2	Chan Millanes	"Overjoyed"	Lea's choice	
Episode 26 (July 15, 2017)	Lea Salonga	3	Patricia Luna	"Fix You"	Eliminated	
Episode 26 (July 15, 2017)	Sharon Cuneta	4	Alessandra Galvez	"The Way We Were"	Eliminated	
Episode 26 (July 15, 2017)	Sharon Cuneta	5	Christy Lagapa	"Shine"	Sharon's choice	
Episode 26 (July 15, 2017)	Sharon Cuneta	6	Jeremy Glinoga	"How Did You Know"	Public's vote	
Episode 27 (July 16, 2017)	Sarah Geronimo	1	Jona Marie Soquite	"Symphony"	Sarah's choice	
Episode 27 (July 16, 2017)	Sarah Geronimo	2	Ivan Navares	"Pagbigyang Muli"	Eliminated	
Episode 27 (July 16, 2017)	Sarah Geronimo	3	Nisha Bedaña	"All I Ask"	Public's vote	
Episode 27 (July 16, 2017)	Bamboo Mañalac	4	Queenie Ugdiman	"Itanong Mo Sa Mga Bata"	Eliminated	
Episode 27 (July 16, 2017)	Bamboo Mañalac	5	Isabela Vinzon	"What a Girl Wants"	Bamboo's choice	
Episode 27 (July 16, 2017)	Bamboo Mañalac	6	Emarjhun de Guzman	"It's a Man's Man's Man's World"	Public's vote	

Non-competition Performances
Order	Performer	Songs
26.1	The Voice Teens Coaches and Top 12 Teen Artists	"We Will Rock You"/"Under Pressure"/"I Want to Break Free"/"Don't Stop Me Now".

=== Week 2: Semifinals (July 22 & 23) ===
The top four artists, one per team, coming from the results of the combined public and coach votes advanced to the finals.

Episode	Coach	Order	Artist	Song	Summary of Points			Result
Episode	Coach	Order	Artist	Song	Public Vote	Coach's Score	Total	Result
Episode 28 (July 22, 2017)	Sarah Geronimo	1	Nisha Bedaña	"Can't Take That Away"	12.60%	47.50%	60.10%	Eliminated
Episode 28 (July 22, 2017)	Sarah Geronimo	2	Jona Marie Soquite	"The Greatest Love of All"	50.00%	48.50%	98.50%	Advanced
Episode 28 (July 22, 2017)	Lea Salonga	3	Chan Millanes	"A Song for You"	23.83%	45.00%	68.83%	Eliminated
Episode 28 (July 22, 2017)	Lea Salonga	4	Mica Becerro	"Lovin' You"	50.00%	47.50%	97.50%	Advanced
Episode 29 (July 23, 2017)	Sharon Cuneta	1	Jeremy Glinoga	"Sign of the Times"	50.00%	49.00%	99.00%	Advanced
Episode 29 (July 23, 2017)	Sharon Cuneta	2	Christy Lagapa	"Don't Cry for Me Argentina"	43.09%	47.50%	90.59%	Eliminated
Episode 29 (July 23, 2017)	Bamboo Mañalac	3	Emarjhun de Guzman	"Butterfly"	31.46%	46.00%	77.46%	Eliminated
Episode 29 (July 23, 2017)	Bamboo Mañalac	4	Isabela Vinzon	"You and I"	50.00%	46.50%	96.50%	Advanced

=== Week 3: Finals (July 29 & 30) ===
Like the previous seasons of The Voice of the Philippines and The Voice Kids, the finals were aired in a two-part episode on July 29 and 30.

The finals of this season followed the format of The Voice Kids where there were three rounds – duet song with the coach, upbeat song, and the power ballad song.

The winner was determined through public votes alone. After all the first-day performances, the voting lines were opened. At Sunday, 12:00 mn, the voting lines were closed. The voting continued after the power ballad performances and was closed immediately after a commercial break. The first and second-day votes were combined. The artist with the highest percentage of votes was declared The Voice Teens Grand Champion.

With Jona Soquite claiming the title, this is the third victory of Sarah Geronimo as coach on all editions of the Philippine franchise of The Voice. Sarah Geronimo is the first coach in all franchises of the Voice around the world that managed artists in three different versions of The Voice (with Jason Dy winning the second season of The Voice of the Philippines and Lyca Gairanod winning the inaugural season of the Philippine version of The Voice Kids).

Coach	Artist	Episode 30 (July 29)				Episode 31 (July 30)		Votes	Result
Coach	Artist	Order	Duet with his/her Coach song	Order	Upbeat song	Order	Power ballad song	Votes	Result
Sarah Geronimo	Jona Marie Soquite	4	"Better Days"	3	"Just Dance"	2	"I Believe I Can Fly"	44.78%	Winner
Bamboo Mañalac	Isabela Vinzon	1	"Kapayapaan"	2	"Despacito"	3	"Rise Up"	22.42%	Runner-up
Lea Salonga	Mica Becerro	3	"The Prayer"	4	"The Diva Dance"	1	"Time to Say Goodbye"	17.79%	Third place
Sharon Cuneta	Jeremy Glinoga	2	"I'll Never Love This Way Again"	1	"Superstition"	4	"Dahil Mahal na Mahal Kita"	15.01%	Fourth place

Non-competition Performance
Order	Performer	Songs
26.1	Lyca Gairanod, Elha Nympha, Joshua Oliveros, Janno Gibbs and Kuh Ledesma	"Ipagpatawad Mo" /"Dito Ba"

== Elimination table ==
=== Results summary ===
Color key
Artist's info

- Artist from Familea
- Artist from Team Sarah
- Artist from Kamp Kawayan
- Artist from Team Sharon

Result details

- Winner
- Runner-up
- Third place
- Fourth Place
- Artist was saved by the public
- Artist was saved by his/her coach
- Artist was saved after receiving the highest accumulated points
- Artist did not perform on that particular week
- Eliminated

Live show results per week
Artist	Week 1		Week 2 Semifinals		Week 3 Finals
Artist	Saturday	Sunday	Saturday	Sunday	Week 3 Finals
Jona Marie Soquite		Safe	Safe		Winner
Isabela Vinzon		Safe		Safe	Runner-up
Mica Becerro	Safe		Safe		3rd Place
Jeremy Glinoga	Safe			Safe	4th Place
Christy Lagapa	Safe			Eliminated	Eliminated (Sunday, Week 2)
Emarjhun De Guzman		Safe		Eliminated	Eliminated (Sunday, Week 2)
Chan Millanes	Safe		Eliminated	Eliminated (Saturday, Week 2)	
Nisha Bedaña		Safe	Eliminated	Eliminated (Saturday, Week 2)	
Ivan Navares		Eliminated	Eliminated (Sunday, Week 1)		
Kyryll Queen Ugdiman		Eliminated	Eliminated (Sunday, Week 1)		
Patricia Luna	Eliminated	Eliminated (Saturday, Week 1)			
Alessandra Galvez	Eliminated	Eliminated (Saturday, Week 1)			

=== Teams ===
Artist's info

- Artist from FamiLea
- Artist from Team Sarah
- Artist from Kamp Kawayan
- Artist from Team Sharon

Result details

- Winner
- Runner-up
- Third place
- Fourth place
- Artist did not perform on that particular week
- Eliminated

Artist	Week 1		Week 2 Semifinals		Week 3 Finals
Artist	Saturday	Sunday	Saturday	Sunday	Week 3 Finals
Mica Becerro	Public's Vote		Advanced		3rd Place
Chan Millanes	Coach's Choice		Eliminated		
Patricia Luna	Eliminated				
Jona Marie Soquite		Coach's Choice	Advanced		Winner
Nisha Bedaña		Public's Vote	Eliminated		
Ivan Navares		Eliminated			
Isabela Vinzon		Coach's Choice		Advanced	Runner-up
Emarjhun De Guzman		Public's Vote		Eliminated	
Kyryll Queen Ugdiman		Eliminated			
Jeremy Glinoga	Public's Vote			Advanced	4th Place
Christy Lagapa	Coach's Choice			Eliminated	
Alessandra Galvez	Eliminated				
