= The Voice Teens (Philippine TV series) =

- Genre: Reality competition
- Created by: John de Mol Jr.
- Based on: The Voice franchise
- Directed by: Johnny Manahan (S1–2); Joane Laygo (S3)
- Presented by: Luis Manzano; Alex Gonzaga; Toni Gonzaga; Bianca Gonzalez; Robi Domingo
- Judges: Sharon Cuneta; Sarah Geronimo; Bamboo Mañalac; Lea Salonga; apl.de.ap; KZ Tandingan; Martin Nievera
- Country of origin: Philippines
- Original languages: Filipino; English
- No. of seasons: 3
- No. of episodes: 74

Production
- Executive producers: Carlo Katigbak; Cory Vidanes; Laurenti Dyogi; Luis Andrada
- Producer: Olivia Zarate
- Production locations: Studio 10, ABS-CBN Broadcast Center, Quezon City, Philippines
- Camera setup: Multicamera
- Running time: 60–75 minutes (incl. adverts)
- Production companies: ABS-CBN Studios (2017–2024); Talpa Media (2017); Endemol Shine Group (2017); ITV Studios (2020–present); GMA Network (2024–present)

Original release
- Network: ABS-CBN
- Release: April 16, 2017 – March 15, 2020
- Network: Kapamilya Channel
- Release: June 13, 2020 – May 19, 2024

Related
- The Voice of the Philippines; The Voice Kids; The Voice Generations; The Voice franchise

The Voice Teens is a Philippine television reality talent competition show broadcast by ABS-CBN and Kapamilya Channel. The second international franchise of The Voice Teens, it is a spin-off of The Voice of the Philippines. Originally directed by Johnny Manahan, it was originally hosted by Luis Manzano. It aired on the network's Yes, Weekend! line up from April 16, 2017 to May 19, 2024, replacing Your Face Sounds Familiar Kids and was replaced by What's Wrong with Secretary Kim. The show has aired three seasons and 74 episodes.

== Overview ==
As a spinoff of The Voice of the Philippines, the show shares numerous elements from its parent show.

=== Format ===
The Voice Teens was a reality television series, a spin-off version of The Voice format that first aired in the Netherlands, that was created in Colombia through La Voz Teens. The original Colombian format features three coaches. The show's concept is indicated by its title: the four coaches will only judge a contestant termed by the show as "artist" with only their vocal talent without prejudice to physical bearing.

The artists who have advance from the audition round would be split into four teams, whom are mentored by coaches who in turn would collaborate with them and choose songs for their artists to perform.

=== On-ground and the producers' auditions ===
As for any The Voice franchise, the first stage is the producers' auditions, which are not shown on television. In The Voice Teens, ABS-CBN headed by their regional partners nationwide and abroad are tasked to conduct the "Unseen Auditions." At this stage, there will be different judges that will use the power of media to conduct three types of screening; radio auditions, online auditions and on-ground auditions where the team will travel in and out of the country to find the best of the best to participate in the next set of auditions, "The Blind Auditions."

=== Blind auditions ===
The first televised stage is the blind auditions, where artists will be given a minimum of 90 seconds to sing their audition piece. The official coaches of the show will be sitting on a chair facing away from the stage and artist. The coaches will only judge by the power, clarity, type and uniqueness of the artists singing capability. If they like what they hear and want to mentor the artist for the next stage, they will push a button on their chair that would turn the chair around to face the artists for the first time. This concept was created to avoid any due prejudice of their physical bearing and life-story. If a coach turns for an artist, that artist will be included in his/her team. If more than one coach turns around, the choice to pick a who will he/she be mentored goes to the artist. If no coach turns his/her chair the auditioning artist's journey ends. At the end, each of the coaches will have a certain number of artists in his or her team who will be advancing to the next round (14 in season 1, 16 in season 2, and 21 in season 3).

A new addition in this version is the Blind Blinds, where the stage is covered with a curtain and will only be dropped to reveal the artist after his or her performance.

In the second season, the Block buttons were introduced; in the said new twist, a coach can push any of the three block buttons designated to block a certain coach. In effect, the coach being blocked will not be able to be chosen by the artist he or she had turned to. Each coach is only eligible to do two blocks in the entire phase of this competition.

=== The Battles ===
The next stage called "The Battles," is where a coach will build from his or her team pairs of 2. A pair will be given a single song to sing together. They are mentored and developed by their respective coach in the process. A vocal showdown will commence in the Battle stage where only the artist whom the coach deemed sung the song assigned better will advance to the next round.

The power to steal a losing artist from the other teams was implemented in the second season of The Voice of the Philippines, and this will be carried over in The Voice Teens. In this twist, a coach can steal two artists (one in Season 2 and 3) during the entire Battles.

=== The Knockouts ===
In the Knockouts, artists will be grouped into three. Each artist had to sing in order to convince their respective coach to pick them for the Live shows. Each artist will decide on what song they will sing. Only one artist will win in each group. At the end of this round, three artists per team will advance to the Live shows.

=== Live Shows ===
The next round known as the "Live Shows" is where the remaining artists per team perform in front the coaches, audience and live broadcast. An artist will be given a song to sing for a chance to advance to the next live show, and ultimately, the finals. The voting results are announced on the same night as the live shows. During the finals, the winner will only be decided upon by the public through different platforms. The most voted artist of the competition will be crowned as The Voice.

== Development ==
The Blind auditions began filming four days in March 2017 at Studio 10 of ABS-CBN Broadcasting Center. The Voice Teens will fill the age gap of the two earlier versions of The Voice franchise, wherein the age requirement was limited from ages 15 to 17. Auditions were announced earlier in 2016 and were held in various key cities within the Philippines.

The Philippines is the second country in the world to adapt The Voice Teens franchise after its success in Colombia.

== Coaches and hosts ==
=== Coaches ===
On January 25, 2017, Lea Salonga first confirmed that she would be returning as a coach for the teen edition's first season, along with Bamboo Mañalac and Sharon Cuneta. This was the sixth time that Salonga teamed up with Mañalac and the second time with Cuneta. Salonga's announcement sparked speculation as to whether the fourth coach would be Sarah Geronimo, who was with Salonga and Mañalac in the adults' and kids' version. Geronimo would go on to return to be a coach after taking a break in the third kids season.

The second season saw a change in the roster of coaches. Cuneta exited the panel; she was replaced with apl.de.ap, who last appeared in the second regular season.

It was announced on February 10, 2024, that Bamboo Mañalac will be the only coach returning from the previous season, while KZ Tandingan and Martin Nievera, coaches of the fifth season of The Voice Kids will join to the panel, replacing Lea Salonga, Sarah Geronimo and apl.de.ap. This is the first teens season to only have three coaches and the first one to have only one female coach. With Salonga and Geronimo departing as coaches, Bamboo Mañalac serves as the last remaining coach from the inaugural season.

Seasons
Coach	Team Name	1	2	3
Bamboo Mañalac	Kamp Kawayan			
Lea Salonga	FamiLea			
Sarah Geronimo	Team Sarah			
Sharon Cuneta	Team Sharon			
apl.de.ap	Team Apl			
KZ Tandingan	Team Supreme			
Martin Nievera	MarTeam			

=== Hosts ===
Toni Gonzaga and Luis Manzano served as presenters in the first season; meanwhile Robi Domingo hosted the show's online companion show on Facebook. Gonzaga left the show in the second season, being replaced with her sister, Alex.

Robi Domingo and Bianca Gonzalez will reprise their roles as presenters for the third teens season following their stint as presenters from the fifth kids season.

Seasons
Presenter	1	2	3
Luis Manzano			
Alex Gonzaga			
Robi Domingo			
Toni Gonzaga			
Jeremy Glinoga			
KaladKaren			
Bianca Gonzalez			
Lorraine Galvez			
Isang Manlapaz			
Kendra Aguirre			
Wize Estabillo			
Nicki Morena			

Legend
Featured as a TV host.
Featured as a backstage host.
Featured as an online host.
Featured as a contestant.

== Seasons ==
Artist's info

Team Lea
Team Sarah

Team Bamboo
Team Sharon

Team Apl
Team KZ

Team Martin

Season	Aired	Winner(s)	Runner(s)-up	Third place	Fourth place	Winning Coach	Hosts		Coaches (chairs' order)			
Season	Aired	Winner(s)	Runner(s)-up	Third place	Fourth place	Winning Coach	Hosts		1	2	3	4
1	2017	Jona Marie Soquite	Isabela Vinzon	Mica Becerro	Jeremy Glinoga	Sarah Geronimo	Luis Manzano	Toni Gonzaga	Lea	Sarah	Bamboo	Sharon
2	2020	Kendra Aguirre	Jaylloyd Garche	Andre Parker	None	Sarah Geronimo	Luis Manzano	Alex Gonzaga	Apl	Lea	Sarah	Bamboo
2	2020	Cydel Gabutero	Alexia Tag-at	Kristian Rajagopal	None	Lea Salonga	Luis Manzano	Alex Gonzaga	Apl	Lea	Sarah	Bamboo
2	2020	Isang Manlapaz	Yang-Yang Aloya	Calvin Candelaria	None	apl.de.ap	Luis Manzano	Alex Gonzaga	Apl	Lea	Sarah	Bamboo
2	2020	Heart Salvador	Kate Campo	Rock Opong	None	Bamboo Mañalac	Luis Manzano	Alex Gonzaga	Apl	Lea	Sarah	Bamboo
3	2024	Jillian Pamat	Steph Lacuata	Yen Victoria	None	Bamboo Mañalac	Robi Domingo	Bianca Gonzalez	Martin	KZ	Bamboo	No fourth coach

=== Teams ===
In each season, each coach chooses a number of acts to progress to the live shows (three for the first two seasons, four in season three). This table shows, for each season, which artists he or she put through to the live shows.

Winners are in denoted in boldface; stolen artists are italicized.

Contestant placing

- Winner
- Runner-up
- Third place
- Fourth place

Season	Coaches and their finalists			
1	Lea Salonga	Sarah Geronimo	Bamboo Mañalac	Sharon Cuneta
1	Mica Becerro	**Jona Marie Soquite**	Isabela Vinzon	Jeremy Glinoga
1	Chan Millanes	Nisha Bedaña	Emarjhun de Guzman	Christy Lagapa
1	Patricia Luna	Ivan Navares	Kyryll Queen Ugdiman	Alessandra Galvez
2	apl.de.ap	Lea Salonga	Sarah Geronimo	Bamboo Mañalac
2	**Isang Manlapaz**	**Cydel Gabutero**	**Kendra Aguirre**	**Heart Salvador**
2	Yang-Yang Aloya	Alexia Tag-at	Jaylloyd Garche	Kate Campo
2	Calvin Candelaria	Kristian Rajagopal	Andre Parker	Rock Opong
3	Martin Nievera	KZ Tandingan	Bamboo Mañalac	No fourth coach
3	Steph Lacuata	Yen Victoria	**Jillian Pamat**	No fourth coach
3	Colline Salazar	Pia Carandang	Nicole Olivo	No fourth coach
3	Sofie Pangilinan	Bianca Ilagan	Antonette Sison	No fourth coach
3	Wendy Figura	Hargie Valirose Ganza	Maelynn Rapista	No fourth coach

=== The Voice Teens Band ===
- Chuck Joson – Musical Director, Piano, and 1st Keyboard
- Janno Queyquep – Guitar
- Naldy Rodriguez – 2nd Keyboard
- Rommel Dela Cruz – Bass Guitar
- Ernie Severino – Drums
- Lindie Ponce Enrile Achacoso – Vocalist 1
- April Concepcion – Vocalist 2
- Anna Achacoso-Garaham – Vocalist 3
- Riki Gonzales - Guitar
- Mark Villena - Drums
- Iean Inigo - Piano, and 1st & 2nd Keyboard
- JunJun Regalado - Drums
- Sammy Gaddi - Vocalist 4

=== Former ===
- Joseph Marco "Otep" Concepcion - Drums

== Reception ==
=== Television ratings ===
Television ratings for The Voice Teens on ABS-CBN are gathered from two major sources, namely from AGB Nielsen and Kantar Media. AGB Nielsen's survey ratings are gathered from 2,000 households based on urban areas only while Kantar Media's survey ratings are gathered from all over the Philippines' 2,610 urban and rural households representing a 100% of the viewership population.

Season	Number of Episodes	Premiere	Rating	Rank		Finale	Rating (Saturday)	Rank		Rating (Sunday)	Rank		Media	Ref.
Season	Number of Episodes	Premiere	Rating	Timeslot	Primetime	Finale	Rating (Saturday)	Timeslot	Primetime	Rating (Sunday)	Timeslot	Primetime	Media	Ref.
1	31	April 16, 2017	37.9%	#1	#1	July 30, 2017	38.2%	#1	#1	40.3%	#1	#1	Kantar Media	
1	31	April 16, 2017	N/A	N/A	N/A	July 30, 2017	N/A	N/A	N/A	N/A	N/A	N/A	AGB Nielsen	—

At the end of 2017, based on the data gathered by Kantar Media, The Voice Teens was the third most watched show in the year after gaining an average audience TV rating of 34.4%.

=== Awards ===
Year	Awards	Nominated	Result	Ref.
2017	31st Star Awards for Television by Philippine Movie Press Club	Toni Gonzaga, Luis Manzano for Best Talent Search Program Host(s)	Won	

== See also ==
- List of programs broadcast by ABS-CBN
