= Kilig =

Excited feeling in a romantic context in Philippine culture

In the context of Philippine culture, the Tagalog word "kilíg" refers to the feeling of excitement due to various love circumstances . The term kilíg can also refer to feeling butterflies in the stomach, and the feeling of being flushed that only a certain person can make one feel. It is also described as romantic excitement.

== Definition ==
There is no clear definition of the concept or a definite translation into English. Some of the not so accurate translations include "giddiness," "shudder," "tremble," "tingle" and "thrill." The word is much closer to the idiomatic expression "tickle pink."

According to Ateneo de Manila University Sociology Anthropology Department faculty member Skilty Labastilla, kilig is usually felt in the first phase of romance, particularly during courtship or honeymoon phase in a relationship. In scientific terms, according to neuropsychologist Dr. Danilo Tuazon, hormones play a role when someone feels kilig. Those hormones that stimulate emotions include testosterone produced by the Leydig cells, adrenaline and norepinephrine, both produced by the adrenal medulla. Testosterone is for motivation while adrenaline is for the increase on one's heart rate and norepinephrine is for the regulation of emotions.

Sociologist Bro. Clifford Sorita, defines kilig as an initial attraction; either having a crush or infatuated being with someone. Sorita insists that in this phase, kilig does not mean that a person has a deep relationship with a certain someone. He asserts that kilig is not yet love. However, the sociologist also added that kilig may lead to love if it becomes an avenue for more meaningful interaction with the person. Filipino journalist Bernadette Sembrano states in her column in The Philippine Star that aside from infatuated love, kilig can also refer to intense passion or interest that leads a person to jump for joy or shout with high-pitched voice.

One can also feel kilig while watching another pair in a romantic relationship in film or television shows.

The word "kilig" was added to the Oxford English Dictionary in March 2016. As a noun, it is defined as "shudder" or a "thrill", while as an adjective it is defined as "exhilarated by an exciting or romantic experience".

== See also ==
- ASMR
- Courtship in the Philippines
