= Bini videography =

The videography of the Filipino girl group Bini consists of thirty three music videos, two featured videos, and three films. The group also appeared in several television shows and commercials for brands such as Jollibee and Shopee. Bini consists of eight members: Aiah, Colet, Maloi, Gwen, Stacey, Mikha, Jhoanna, and Sheena, and debuted on June 11, 2021, after undergoing two years of training under Star Hunt Academy.

== Music videos ==
| Title | Year | Director(s) | Ref. |
|---|---|---|---|
| "Da Coconut Nut" | 2020 | Kring Kim (Key Elements Creative Media) | |
| "Born to Win" | 2021 | Amiel Kirby Balagtas (YouMeUs MNL) | |
| "Kapit Lang" | 2021 | Amiel Kirby Balagtas (YouMeUs MNL) | |
| "Golden Arrow" | 2021 | Amiel Kirby Balagtas (YouMeUs MNL) | |
| "Kinikilig" | 2021 | | |
| "Na Na Na" (Official Music Video) | 2022 | Miko Pelino | |
| "Na Na Na" (Performance Music Video) | 2022 | | |
| "Up!" (with BGYO) | 2022 | Michael Perz | |
| "Lagi" (Official Music Video) | 2022 | Amiel Kirby Balagtas (YouMeUs MNL) | |
| "Lagi" (Performance Music Video) | 2022 | | |
| "Made for All" | 2022 | Jireh Christian Bacasno (YouMeUs MNL) | |
| "Kabataang Pinoy" (with SB19 and Jonathan Manalo) | 2022 | - | |
| "Pit A Pat" | 2022 | Amiel Kirby Balagtas (YouMeUs MNL) | |
| "I Feel Good" | 2022 | Kerbs Balagtas (YouMeUs MNL) | |
| "Strings" | 2022 | Kerbs Balagtas (YouMeUs MNL) | |
| "Its A Kind of Magic (PH Version)" (with KZ Tandingan and The Juans) | 2022 | - | |
| "Super Crush" | 2023 | - | |
| "Bata, Kaya Mo" | 2023 | - | |
| "Karera" | 2023 | Kerbs Balagtas (YouMeUs MNL) | |
| "I Feel Good" (BreakTudo Awards 2023 version) | 2023 | Kerbs Balagtas (YouMeUs MNL) | |
| "Pantropiko" | 2023 | Kerbs Balagtas (YouMeUs MNL) | |
| "Salamin Salamin" | 2024 | Kerbs Balagtas (YouMeUs MNL) | |
| "Gandang Vitakeratin" | 2024 | Kerbs Balagtas (YouMeUs MNL) | |
| "Nasa Atin Ang Panalo" (with SB19, Flow G, and SunKissed Lola) | 2024 | Jorel Lising | |
| "Nasa Atin Ang Panalo" (Bini-only version) | 2024 | - | |
| "Cherry on Top" | 2024 | Kerbs Balagtas (YouMeUs MNL) | |
| "Rexona Lagi" | 2024 | - | |
| "Laging Fudgee, Fudgee Lagi" | 2024 | - | |
| "Cherry on Top (BiniMo Remix)" (with Agnez Mo) | 2024 | | |
| "Icon" | 2024 | Kerbs Balagtas (YouMeUs MNL) | |
| "Blooming" | 2024 | - | |
| "Joy to the World" | 2024 | - | |
| "Our Stories Shine This Christmas" (with ABS-CBN Music All Star) | 2024 | Paolo Ramos | |
| "Our Stories Shine This Christmas" (Bini-only version) | 2024 | Paolo Ramos | |
| "Ikaw ang Idol Ko" | 2025 | | |
| "Super Crunch Coded" | 2025 | | |
| "Blink Twice" | 2025 | Kerbs Balagtas | |
| "Blink Twice (Dos Veces Remix)" (with Belinda) | 2025 | Kerbs Balagtas | |
| "Top" | 2025 | | |
| "Zero Pressure" | 2025 | Kerbs Balagtas | |
| "Oxygen" | 2025 | - | |
| "Shagidi" | 2025 | Kerbs Balagtas | |
| "First Luv" | 2025 | Jason Max | |
| "Love, Joy, Hope: Sabay Tayo Ngayong Pasko" (with ABS-CBN Music All Star) | 2025 | Paolo Ramos | |
| "Sweet Tooth" | 2025 | Kerbs Balagtas | |
| "Paruparo" | 2026 | Kerbs Balagtas | |
| "Unang Kilig" | 2026 | Kerbs Balagtas | |
| "Blush" | 2026 | Kerbs Balagtas | |
| "Dahil Sa'yo" | 2026 | | |
| "Step Back" | 2026 | | |

=== Featured videos ===
| Title | Year | Note(s) | Ref. |
|---|---|---|---|
| The Bini Chronicles | 2020 | The journey of the members of Bini through their training and the introduction of their positions. Premiered on December 28 (2-part episode). | |
| The Making of Da Coconut Nut | 2021 | The making of Bini's pre-debut single "Da Coconut Nut". Premiered on January 25 (2-part episode). | |

== Filmography ==
=== Film ===
| Year | Title | Role | Notes | Ref. |
|---|---|---|---|---|
| 2022 | Bini & BGYO Dubai Adventures: A Docufilm | Themselves | Live premiere in Dolphy Theatre, Quezon City and simulcast via live streaming through KTX | |
| 2024 | Bini Chapter 1: Born To Win | Themselves | The first part of a trilogy documentary, released on September 26 via iWantTFC | |
| 2024 | Bini Chapter 2: Here With You | Themselves | The second part of a trilogy documentary, released on November 8 via iWantTFC | |
| 2025 | Bini Chapter 3: Hanggang Dulo | Themselves | The third and final part of a trilogy documentary, released on June 12 via iWantTFC | |

=== Show ===
| Year | Title | Role | Notes | Ref. |
|---|---|---|---|---|
| 2021 | One Dream: The Bini - BGYO Journey | Themselves | Nine episodes telecast worldwide via Myx Global's Myx TV and aired online via iWantTFC | |
| 2025 | Biniversus | Themselves | Bini's variety show aired online via YouTube. | |

=== Television ===
| Year | Month/Date | Program | Ref. |
|---|---|---|---|
| 2019 | August 3 | Pinoy Big Brother: Otso | |
| 2020 | November 21 | It's Showtime | |
| 2020 | November 24 | Myx Philippines - Myxclusive | |
| 2020 | November 29 | ASAP Natin 'To | |
| 2020 | November 29 | Iba 'Yan | |
| 2020 | December 6 | Pinoy Big Brother: Connect | |
| 2020 | December 11 | Teleradyo - Sakto | |
| 2020 | December 13 | ASAP Natin 'To | |
| 2020 | December 20 | ABS-CBN Christmas Special 2020 | |
| 2021 | January 5 | Magandang Buhay | |
| 2021 | January 17 | ASAP Natin 'To | |
| 2021 | January 18 | We Rise Together | |
| 2021 | January 25 | ASAP Natin 'To | |
| 2021 | February 13 | It's Showtime | |
| 2021 | February 14 | ASAP Natin 'To | |
| 2021 | February 21 | ASAP Natin 'To | |
| 2021 | February 27 | Pinoy Big Brother: Connect | |
| 2021 | March 17 | Magandang Buhay (Re-broadcast) | |
| 2021 | April 3 | Letters and Music | |
| 2021 | April 4 | ASAP Natin 'To (Re-broadcast) | |
| 2021 | April 9 | K World: Better Together! | |
| 2021 | June 13 | ASAP Natin 'To | |
| 2021 | June 20 | Bini: The Launch - The Runway (TV Premiere) | |
| 2021 | June 21 | Bini: The Launch - The Showcase (TV Premiere) | |
| 2021 | June 27 | All for One (Canadian Multiculturalism Day) | |
| 2021 | June 27 | ASAP Natin 'To | |
| 2021 | July 3 | It's Showtime | |
| 2021 | July 11 | ASAP Natin 'To | |
| 2021 | July 15 | Magandang Buhay | |
| 2021 | July 25 | ASAP Natin 'To | |
| 2021 | August 1 | ASAP Natin 'To | |
| 2021 | September 19 | ASAP Natin 'To | |
| 2022 | March 6 | ASAP Natin 'To | |
| 2022 | March 13 | ASAP Natin 'To | |
| 2022 | April 10 | ASAP Natin 'To | |
| 2022 | May 15 | ASAP Natin 'To | |
| 2022 | June 12 | ASAP Natin 'To | |
| 2022 | June 26 | ASAP Natin 'To | |
| 2022 | September 4 | ASAP Natin 'To | |
| 2022 | November 13 | ASAP Natin 'To | |
| 2022 | November 20 | ASAP Natin 'To | |
| 2023 | April 10 | TiktoClock | |
| 2023 | April 16 | ASAP Natin 'To | |
| 2023 | May 6 | Family Feud | |
| 2023 | July 9 | ASAP Natin 'To | |
| 2023 | September 23 | It’s Showtime | |
| 2023 | December 3 | ASAP Natin 'To | |
| 2024 | January 18 | Drag Den season 2 | |
| 2024 | March 10 | Tao Po! | |
| 2024 | April 15 | TV Patrol | |
| 2024 | August 11 | ASAP Natin 'To | |
| 2024 | October 21 | TV Patrol | |
| 2024 | October 24 | It’s Showtime | |
| 2024 | November 10 | Kapuso Mo, Jessica Soho | |
| 2024 | December 8 | ASAP Natin 'To | |
| 2024 | December 30 | Family Feud (Re-broadcast) | |
| 2025 | January 31 | Fast Talk with Boy Abunda | |
| 2025 | February 1 | It's Showtime | |
| 2025 | February 1 | Rainbow Rumble | |
| 2025 | February 2 | ASAP | |
| 2025 | February 9 | Rainbow Rumble | |
| 2025 | February 16 | ASAP | |
| 2025 | May 1 | Maalaala Mo Kaya | |
| 2025 | June 2 | Good Day New York | |
| 2025 | June 13 | Las Vegas Now | |
| 2025 | August 3 | ASAP | |
| 2025 | August 10 | ASAP | |
| 2025 | August 17 | All-Out Sundays | |
| 2025 | September 7 | ASAP | |
| 2025 | September 14 | ASAP | |
| 2025 | September 23 | BINI World Tour Stories | |
| 2025 | November 21 | It's Showtime | |
| 2025 | December 7 | ASAP | |
| 2026 | February 1 | ASAP | |
| 2026 | February 8 | ASAP | |
| 2026 | March 1 | ASAP | |
| 2026 | March 8 | ASAP | |
| 2026 | March 9 | It's Showtime | |
| 2026 | March 15 | ASAP | |
| 2026 | May 21 | BINIverse and Chorus | |
| 2026 | April 25 | Good Day L.A. | |
| 2026 | September 22 | Today Extra | |
| 2026 | November 15 | Gandang Gabi Vice | |

=== Webcast ===
| Year | Title | Network | Note(s) | Ref. |
|---|---|---|---|---|
| 2020 | Bini on Kumu Live | Kumu | Three live streams per week, continued until December 2023 | |
| 2021 | Bini on Kumu Live | Kumu | Three live streams per week, continued until December 2023 | |
| 2021 | One Dream: Virtual Hangout | iWantTFC YouTube Channel | Nine episodes | |
| 2021 | MTV Asia Spotlight Artist for October and November | MTV Asia | Nine episodes | |
| 2022 | Bini Roadtrip Adventures | Bini Official YouTube Channel | Web series showcasing the group's road trip adventures across various locations, totaling 17 episodes | |
| 2023 | Podcast Ng Mga Walang Jowa by Bini | Spotify, Bini Official YouTube Channel | Video podcast featuring pairs of members discussing their perspectives on love and relationships, totaling 12 episodes | |
