= List of awards and nominations received by Bini =

Bini awards and nominations
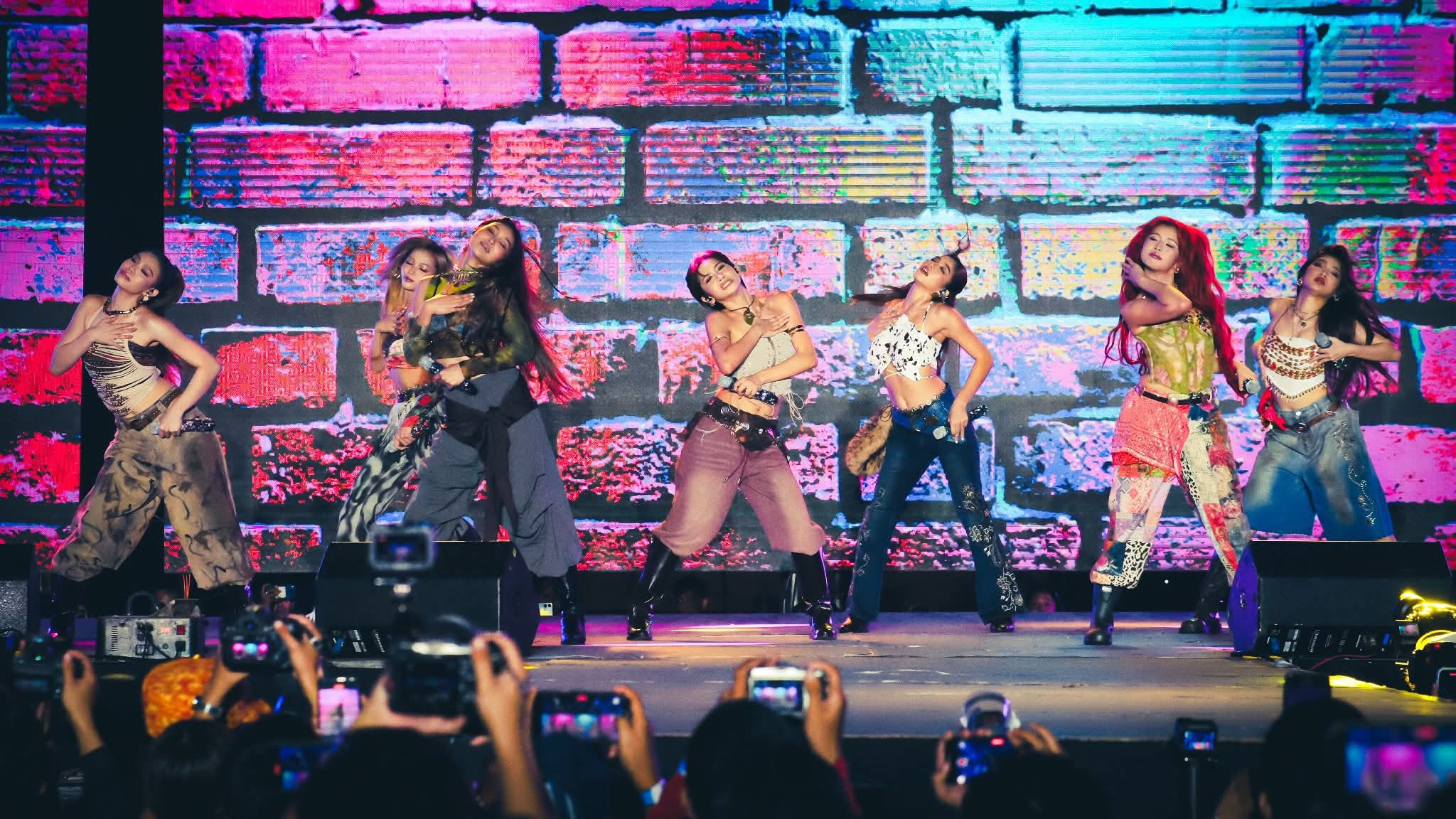
- Bini at Ibalong Festival 2025.
Awards and nominations
Award	Wins	Nominations
Acervo Awards	1	1
Aliw Awards	0	1
ALTA Media Icon Awards	2	2
Araneta Group	1	1
Asian Pillars Awards	1	1
Awit Awards	11	37
Billboard Philippines Women in Music	0	1
Box Office Entertainment Awards	2	2
BreakTudo Awards	5	9
Diamond Excellence Awards	1	1
Excellent Filipino Awards	1	1
FAMAS Awards	1	1
Filipino Music Awards	2	11
Gawad Lasallianeta	1	1
Gawad Pasado	1	1
Golden Laurel: The Batangas Province Media Awards	1	1
Grammy Awards	0	1
Jupiter Music Awards	3	10
KBP Golden Dove Awards	1	1
Laurus Nobilis Media Excellence Awards	1	1
Mega Fashion Awards 2024	0	1
Monster 93.1 Music Awards	3	3
Music Rank Asian Choice Awards	2	2
MTV Europe Music Awards	1	1
Myx Music Awards	2	4
New Hue Video Music Awards	2	4
New York Festivals	0	1
Nickelodeon Kids’ Choice Awards	1	1
Pinoy Rebyu Awards	0	1
Platinum Stallion National Media Awards	2	2
PMPC Star Awards for Music	3	9
P-pop Music Awards	19	23
Push Awards	1	1
RAWR Awards	2	4
Saludo Excellence Awards	1	1
SEC Awards	0	2
Tag Awards Chicago	2	3
TikTok Awards Philippines	1	2
ToyCon Philippines	1	1
VP Choice Awards	6	15
Wish Music Awards	3	7

Totals (Note: Certain award groups do not simply award one winner. They acknowledge several different recipients, have runners-up, and have third place. Since this is a specific recognition and is different from losing an award, runner-up mentions are considered wins in this award tally. For simplification and to avoid errors, each award in this list has been presumed to have had a prior nomination.)
- Wins: 89
- Nominations: 168
- Honours: 14

The Filipino girl group Bini, composed of Aiah, Colet, Maloi, Gwen, Stacey, Mikha, Jhoanna and Sheena, has received numerous awards and nominations for their contributions to music. In 2018, ABS-CBN's Head of Entertainment Production, Laurenti Dyogi, selected the members from a talent search to undergo training. The members began their career in 2020 with the release of the group's pre-debut single, a cover of Ryan Cayabyab's song "Da Coconut Nut". Bini gained wider recognition with the release of "Born to Win" in 2021, which was nominated for Wish Pop Song of the Year at the Wish Music Awards.

In 2022, Bini released its second studio album, Feel Good, which produced the single "Lagi". The song earned several nominations at the 2023 Awit Awards, including Record of the Year and Song of the Year. In 2023, the group won the International New Artist Song award at the BreakTudo Awards and was named Top Favorite Group of the Year at the P-pop Music Awards, where Aiah, Sheena, and Jhoanna also won individual awards.

The group released its first extended play (EP), Talaarawan, in 2023. The EP included the single "Pantropiko", which won several accolades, including Song of the Year at the Myx Music Awards 2024 and two awards at the 2024 Awit Awards. That same year, Bini became the first Filipino group to win Best Asia Act at the 2024 MTV Europe Music Awards and was also honored with the Rising Star Award at the Billboard Philippines Women in Music. At the 2024 Ppop Music Awards, the group won several awards, with their Grand Biniverse concert winning the Concert of the Year.

In 2025, Bini won three awards at the Wish Music Awards, including Wish Group of the Year. On February 19, they were named Top Local Artist of the Year during the inaugural event of the Official Philippines Chart. That same month, the group received two awards at the Platinum Stallion National Media Awards, and their documentary Bini Chapter 1: Born to Win was nominated for Best Documentary Feature at the 5th Pinoy Rebyu (Note: A Filipino loanword for "review".) Awards. In March, they were recognized as Women of the Year by Billboard Philippines in its Women in Music event. In May, Bini was included in Forbes' 30 Under 30 Asia list under Entertainment & Sports. Later that month, they received a certificate of commendation from the Philippine Consulate General in Dubai at a stop on their 2025 Biniverse World Tour. On June 25, they won the Concert of the Year award for the Grand Biniverse and were recognized as the Recording/Streaming/Concert Performing Group of the Year at the 53rd Box Office Entertainment Awards.

In March 2026, Bini was named Powerhouse of the Year by Billboard Philippines, marking its third consecutive year receiving the honor from the organization. In April 2026, the Billboard Women in Music bestowed Bini with the Global Force Award. In November 2026, Bini was named Favorite Global Music Star by the Nickelodeon Kids' Choice Awards. In the same month, Bini earned a nomination for Best Asian Pop Music Performance at the 69th Annual Grammy Awards.

== Awards and nominations ==
Award	Year (Note: Indicates the year of the ceremony. Each year is linked to the article about the awards held that year, wherever possible.)	Category	Recipient(s)	Result	Ref.
Acervo Awards	2022	International Highlight	Bini	Won	
Aliw Awards	2024	Best Collaboration in a Concert	Biniverse	Nominated	
Aliw Awards	2025	Best Director for a Major Concert	Binified (with Mickey Perz and Jon R. Moll)	Nominated	
ALTA Media Icon Awards	2025	Best P-pop Group	Bini	Won	
ALTA Media Icon Awards	2026	Best P-pop Group	Bini	Won	
Araneta Group	2024	Golden Dome Award	Bini	Won	
Asian Pillars Awards	2024	Phenomenal Pop Girl Group of the Year	Bini	Won	
Awit Awards	2021	Favorite Group Artist	Bini	Nominated	
Awit Awards	2022	People's Voice Favorite Group Artist	Bini	Nominated	
Awit Awards	2022	People's Voice Breakthrough Artist	Bini	Nominated	
Awit Awards	2022	People's Voice Favorite Song	"Na Na Na"	Nominated	
Awit Awards	2023	Album of the Year	Feel Good	Nominated	
Awit Awards	2023	Record of the Year	"Kabataang Pinoy" (with SB19)	Nominated	
Awit Awards	2023	Record of the Year	"Lagi"	Nominated	
Awit Awards	2023	Song of the Year	"Lagi"	Nominated	
Awit Awards	2023	Best Performance by a Group Recording Artist	"Lagi"	Nominated	
Awit Awards	2023	Best Collaboration	"Up!" (with BGYO)	Nominated	
Awit Awards	2023	Best Collaboration	"Kabataang Pinoy" (with SB19)	Nominated	
Awit Awards	2023	Best Pop Recording	"Lagi"	Nominated	
Awit Awards	2024	People's Voice Breakthrough Artist of the Year	Bini	Won	
Awit Awards	2024	People's Voice Favorite Group Artist	Bini	Won	
Awit Awards	2024	Record of the Year	"Pantropiko"	Nominated	
Awit Awards	2024	Song of the Year	"Pantropiko"	Nominated	
Awit Awards	2024	Best Performance by a Group	"Pantropiko"	Nominated	
Awit Awards	2024	Best Pop Recording	"Pantropiko"	Nominated	
Awit Awards	2024	Best Engineered Recording	"Pantropiko"	Nominated	
Awit Awards	2024	People's Voice Favorite Record of the Year	"Pantropiko"	Won	
Awit Awards	2024	People's Voice Favorite Song of the Year	"Pantropiko"	Won	
Awit Awards	2024	Best Inspirational Recording	"Karera"	Nominated	
Awit Awards	2024	Best Music Video	"Karera"	Nominated	
Awit Awards	2024	People's Voice Favorite Music Video of the Year	"Karera"	Won	
Awit Awards	2025	Album of the Year	Talaarawan	Nominated	
Awit Awards	2025	Best Dance/Electronic Recording	"Salamin, Salamin"	Won	
Awit Awards	2025	Music Video of the Year	"Salamin, Salamin"	Nominated	
Awit Awards	2025	Music Video of the Year	"Cherry on Top"	Nominated	
Awit Awards	2025	People's Voice Favorite Album of the Year	Talaarawan	Won	
Awit Awards	2025	People's Voice Favorite Group Artist	Bini	Won	
Awit Awards	2025	Most Streamed Artist	Bini	Won	
Awit Awards	2025	Vibe Stan Award	Blooms	Won	
Awit Awards	2026	Best Performance by a Group	Shagidi	Nominated	
Awit Awards	2026	Best Pop Recording	Shagidi	Nominated	
Awit Awards	2026	Best R&B Recording	"Katabi"	Nominated	
Awit Awards	2026	Best Global Collaboration Recording	"Cherry on Top (BiniMo) Remix" (with Agnez Mo)	Nominated	
Awit Awards	2026	Dangal ng Musikang Pilipino - Global Impact Award	Bini	Won	
Billboard Women in Music	2026	Global Force	Bini	Honoree	
Billboard Philippines Women in Music	2024	Rising Star Award	Bini	Honoree	
Billboard Philippines Women in Music	2025	Women of the Year	Bini	Honoree	
Billboard Philippines Women in Music	2026	People's Choice	Bini	Nominated	
Billboard Philippines Women in Music	2026	Powerhouse of the Year	Bini	Honoree	
Billboard Korea K Power 100	2024	Voices of Asia Award	Bini	Awardee	
Box Office Entertainment Awards	2025	Concert of the Year	Grand Biniverse	Won	
Box Office Entertainment Awards	2025	Recording/Streaming/Concert Performing Group of the Year	Bini	Won	
BreakTudo Awards	2023	International New Artist Song	"I Feel Good"	Won	
BreakTudo Awards	2024	International Breakthrough Artist	Bini	Won	
BreakTudo Awards	2024	International Video of the Year	"Cherry on Top"	Won	
BreakTudo Awards	2025	International Fandom of the Year	Bloom	Nominated	
BreakTudo Awards	2025	International Women of the Year	Bini	Won	
BreakTudo Awards	2025	International Collaboration of the Year	"Blink Twice (Remix)" (with Belinda)	Won	
BreakTudo Awards	2026	International Fandom of the Year	Bloom	Pending	
BreakTudo Awards	2026	International Women's Group	Bini	Pending	
BreakTudo Awards	2026	International Music Video	"Sweet Tooth"	Pending	
Diamond Excellence Awards	2022	Outstanding Female Group of the Year	Bini	Won	
Excellent Filipino Awards	2024	National Outstanding P-pop Female Group of the Year	Bini	Won	
FAMAS Award	2026	FAMAS Youth Achievement Award	Bini	Won	
Filipino Music Awards	2025	People's Choice Awards: Artist	Bini	Nominated	
Filipino Music Awards	2025	People's Choice Awards: Song	"Blink Twice"	Nominated	
Filipino Music Awards	2025	Album of the Year	Biniverse	Nominated	
Filipino Music Awards	2025	Tour of the Year	Biniverse World Tour 2025	Nominated	
Filipino Music Awards	2025	Artist of the Year	Bini	Nominated	
Filipino Music Awards	2026	People's Choice Awards: Artist	Bini	Nominated	
Filipino Music Awards	2026	Artist of the Year	Bini	Won	
Filipino Music Awards	2026	People's Choice Awards: Song	"Blush"	Nominated	
Filipino Music Awards	2026	Album of the Year	"Signals"	Nominated	
Filipino Music Awards	2026	Tour of the Year	"Signals World Tour 2026"	Won	
Filipino Music Awards	2026	Pop Song of the Year	"Unang Kilig"	Nominated	
Gawad Lasallianeta	2025	Most Outstanding OPM Artist	Bini	Won	
Gawad Pasado	2024	Pinakapasadong Dangal ng Kabataan (Note: lit. 'Highest Honor of Youth'; officially stylized as PinakaPASADOng Dangal ng Kabataan)	Bini	Won	
Golden Laurel: The Batangas Province Media Awards	2024	Breakthrough P-pop Group	Bini	Won	
Grammy Awards	2027	Best Asian Pop Music Performance	Bini	Pending	
Jupiter Music Awards	2024	Most Popular Dance Performer	Bini	Won	
Jupiter Music Awards	2025	Female Group of the Year	Bini	Won	
Jupiter Music Awards	2025	Album of the Year	Biniverse	Nominated	
Jupiter Music Awards	2025	Song of the Year	"Cherry on Top (BiniMo) Remix" (with Agnez Mo)	Nominated	
Jupiter Music Awards	2025	Collaboration of the Year	"Cherry on Top (BiniMo) Remix" (with Agnez Mo)	Nominated	
Jupiter Music Awards	2025	Music Video of the year	"Cherry on Top (BiniMo) Remix" (with Agnez Mo)	Nominated	
Jupiter Music Awards	2026	Female Group of the Year	Bini	Nominated	
Jupiter Music Awards	2026	Most Influential Southeast Asian Artiste (Female)	Bini	Won	
Jupiter Music Awards	2026	Album of the Year	"Signals"	Nominated	
Jupiter Music Awards	2026	Song of the Year	"Blush"	Nominated	
KBP Golden Dove Awards	2026	Best Special Program	Bini Chapter 3: Hanggang Dulo	Won	
Laurus Nobilis Media Excellence Awards	2025	Media Excellence in Musical Performance	Bini	Won	
Manila Bulletin	2024	Newsmakers of the Year	Bini	Honoree	
Mega Fashion Awards 2024	2024	Cultural Impact Award	Bini	Honoree	
Monster RX 93.1 Music Awards	2024	OPM Artist of the Year	Bini	Won	
Monster RX 93.1 Music Awards	2024	P-pop Artist of the Year	Bini	Won	
Monster RX 93.1 Music Awards	2026	P-Pop Artist of the Year	Bini	Won	
Music Rank Asian Choice Awards	2025	Asian P-pop Girl Group of the Year	Bini	Won	
Music Rank Asian Choice Awards	2025	Asia's Global Fan Choice	Bini	Won	
Myx Music Awards	2024	Pop Video of the Year	Bini	Won	
Myx Music Awards	2024	Song of the Year	Bini	Won	
Myx Music Awards	2024	Artist of the Year	Bini	Nominated	
Myx Music Awards	2024	Music Video of the Year	Bini	Nominated	
MTV Europe Music Awards	2024	Best Asia Act	Bini	Won	
Net Makabata Awards	2024	Net Makabata Star Award	Bini	Awardee	
Net Makabata Awards	2025	Net Makabata Star Award	Bini	Awardee	
Net Makabata Awards	2025	Net Makabata Television Award	Bini Aiah	Awardee	
New Hue Video Music Awards	2025	Group of the Year	Bini	Won	
New Hue Video Music Awards	2025	Concert of the Year	Grand Biniverse	Won	
New Hue Video Music Awards	2025	Song of the Year	"Pantropiko"	Nominated	
New Hue Video Music Awards	2025	Music Video of the Year	"Cherry on Top"	Nominated	
New York Festivals	2025	Best Documentary: Biography/Profiles	Bini Chapter 1: Born to Win	Nominated	
Nickelodeon Kids' Choice Awards	2026	Favorite Global Music Star	Bini	Won	
P-pop Music Awards	2022	P-pop Icon of the Year	Bini	Won	
P-pop Music Awards	2022	P-pop Girl Group of the Year	Bini	Nominated	
P-pop Music Awards	2023	Top Female Dancer of the Year	Bini Sheena	Won	
P-pop Music Awards	2023	Top Female Visual of the Year	Bini Aiah	Won	
P-pop Music Awards	2023	Top Female Leader of the Year	Bini Jhoanna	Won	
P-pop Music Awards	2023	Top Favorite Group of the Year	Bini	Won	
P-pop Music Awards	2024	Artist of the Year	Bini	Won	
P-pop Music Awards	2024	Breakthrough Artist of the Year	Bini	Nominated	
P-pop Music Awards	2024	Favorite Streamed Artist	Bini	Awardee	
P-pop Music Awards	2024	Album of the Year	Talaarawan	Won	
P-pop Music Awards	2024	Concert of the Year	Grand Biniverse	Won	
P-pop Music Awards	2024	Fandom of the Year	Bloom	Won	
P-pop Music Awards	2024	Music Video of the Year	"Cherry on Top"	Nominated	
P-pop Music Awards	2024	Music Video of the Year	"Salamin, Salamin"	Won	
P-pop Music Awards	2024	Production Design in a Music Video	"Salamin, Salamin"	Won	
P-pop Music Awards	2024	Song of the Year	"Pantropiko"	Won	
P-pop Music Awards	2024	Song of the Year	"Salamin, Salamin"	Nominated	
P-pop Music Awards	2025	Artist of the Year	Bini	Nominated	
P-pop Music Awards	2025	Favorite Streamed Artist	Bini	Won	
P-pop Music Awards	2025	Song of the Year	"Blink Twice"	Nominated	
P-pop Music Awards	2025	Music Video of the Year	"Blink Twice"	Nominated	
P-pop Music Awards	2025	Best Production Design in a Music Video	"Blink Twice"	Won	
P-pop Music Awards	2025	Album of the Year	Biniverse	Nominated	
P-pop Music Awards	2026	Artist of the Year	Bini	Won	
P-pop Music Awards	2026	Ace of the Year	Colet	Won	
P-pop Music Awards	2026	Dancer of the Year	Sheena	Won	
P-pop Music Awards	2026	Leader of the Year	Jhoanna	Won	
P-pop Music Awards	2026	Visual of the Year	Aiah	Won	
P-pop Music Awards	2026	Song of the Year	"Blush"	Nominated	
P-pop Music Awards	2026	Production Design in a Music Video	"Blush"	Nominated	
P-pop Music Awards	2026	Choreography in a Video Performance	"Step Back"	Nominated	
Pinoy Rebyu Awards	2025	Best Documentary Feature	Bini Chapter 1: Born to Win	Nominated	
Platinum Stallion National Media Awards	2025	Filipino Girl Group of the Year	Bini	Won	
Platinum Stallion National Media Awards	2025	Music Video of the Year	"Cherry on Top"	Won	
PMPC Star Awards for Music	2024	Song of the Year	"Pantropiko"	Nominated	
PMPC Star Awards for Music	2024	Duo/Group Artist of the Year	"Pantropiko"	Won	
PMPC Star Awards for Music	2024	Dance Recording of the Year	"Pantropiko"	Nominated	
PMPC Star Awards for Music	2026	Song of the Year	"Salamin, Salamin"	Nominated	
PMPC Star Awards for Music	2026	Music Video of the Year	"Salamin, Salamin"	Nominated	
PMPC Star Awards for Music	2026	Dance Recording of the Year	"Salamin, Salamin"	Won	
PMPC Star Awards for Music	2026	Album of the Year	Talaarawan	Nominated	
PMPC Star Awards for Music	2026	Duo/Group Artist of the Year	Talaarawan	Nominated	
PMPC Star Awards for Music	2026	Pop Album of the Year	Talaarawan	Won	
Preview Creative 25: 2022	2022	Most Promising Talent in Musician's Category	Bini	Honoree	
Push Awards	2023	Push P-pop Group of the Year	Bini	Won	
RAWR Awards	2026	Favorite Group	Bini	Nominated	
RAWR Awards	2026	Favorite Performer	Bini	Won	
RAWR Awards	2026	Fan Club of the Year	Blooms	Nominated	
RAWR Awards	2026	Song of the Year	"Blush"	Won	
Saludo Excellence Awards	2021	Best Female Group	Bini	Won	
SEC Awards	2026	International Group/Duo of the Year	Bini	Pending	
SEC Awards	2026	International Album/EP of the Year	Flames	Pending	
Tag Awards Chicago	2023	Band of the Year	Bini	Nominated	
Tag Awards Chicago	2024	P-pop Stars of the Year	Bini	Gold	
Tag Awards Chicago	2026	P-Pop Stars of the Year	Bini	Gold	
The Official Philippines Chart	2025	Top Local Artist of the Year	Bini	Honoree	
The Orchard	2026	Rising Women Ambassadors	Bini	Honoree	
TikTok Awards Philippines	2022	P-pop Group of the Year	Bini	Won	
TikTok Awards Philippines	2023	Song of the Year	"Na Na Na"	Nominated	
ToyCon Philippines	2026	Pinoy Pop Culture Award	Bini	Awardee	
VP Choice Awards	2025	P-pop Group of the Year	Bini	Won	
VP Choice Awards	2025	Group Performer of the Year	Bini	Nominated	
VP Choice Awards	2025	Breakthrough Social Media Star of the Year	Aiah Arceta	Won	
VP Choice Awards	2025	Female TikTok Face of the Year	Maloi Ricalde	Won	
VP Choice Awards	2025	Female TikTok Face of the Year	Mikha Lim	Nominated	
VP Choice Awards	2025	P-pop Song of the Year	"Salamin, Salamin"	Won	
VP Choice Awards	2025	Music Video of the Year	"Cherry on Top"	Nominated	
VP Choice Awards	2025	Viral TikTok Video of the Year	"Eyyyy" by Sheena Catacutan	Nominated	
VP Choice Awards	2025	Fandom of the Year	Bloom	Nominated	
VP Choice Awards	2026	Group Performer of the Year	Bini	Nominated	
VP Choice Awards	2026	P-Pop Song of the Year	"First Luv"	Nominated	
VP Choice Awards	2026	P-Pop Group of the Year	Bini	Won	
VP Choice Awards	2026	Female TikTok Face of the Year	Maloi Ricalde	Won	
VP Choice Awards	2026	Female TikTok Face of the Year	Gwen Apuli	Nominated	
VP Choice Awards	2026	Viral TikTok Video of the Year	"Shagidi" by Sheena Catacutan	Nominated	
Wish Music Awards	2021	Wish Pop Song of the Year	"Born to Win"	Nominated	
Wish Music Awards	2022	Wish Pop Song of the Year	"Golden Arrow"	Nominated	
Wish Music Awards	2025	Wishclusive Pop Performance of the Year	"Karera"	Won	
Wish Music Awards	2025	Wish Pop Song of the Year	"Pantropiko"	Won	
Wish Music Awards	2025	Wish Group of the Year	Bini	Won	
Wish Music Awards	2026	Wishclusive Pop Song of the Year	"Blink Twice"	Nominated	
Wish Music Awards	2026	Wish Group of the Year	Bini	Nominated	
Zeenfluential Awards	2025	Zeenfluential P-pop Group	Bini	Nominated	
Zeenfluential Awards	2025	Zeenfluential Music Artist	Bini	Nominated	

== Other accolades ==
=== State honors ===
List of state honors, showing countries of origin, years given, names of organizations, and names of honors
Country	Year	Organization	Honor	Ref.
Philippines	2025	House of Representatives of the Philippines	House Resolution No. 2154 (Note: "A Resolution Congratulating and Commending Bini for Winning the 'Best Asia Act' Award at the 2024 MTV Europe Music Awards and for Bringing Honor to the Philippines Through Their Achievements in the International Music Industry")	
Philippines	2025	House of Representatives of the Philippines	House Resolution No. 2341 (Note: "A Resolution Congratulating and Commending the Filipino Pop Groups SB19, Bini, and BGYO for their Victories at the 2024 BreakTudo Awards in Brazil, and for Bringing Honor and Recognition to the Philippines Through their Outstanding Contributions to the International Music Industry.")	
Philippines	2025	Philippine Consulate General in Dubai	Certificate of Commendation	
Philippines	2026	Senate of the Philippines	Senate Resolution No. 370 (Note: "Resolution Congratulating and Commending Bini for Attaining the Historic Milestone of being the First Filipino Act to Perform at the Coachella Valley Music And Arts Festival in Indio, California, and for Bringing Pride and Honor to the Philippines.")	
Philippines	2026	House of Representatives of the Philippines	House Resolution No. 93 (Note: "Resolution Congratulating and Commending the Pinoy Pop (P-pop) Girl Group Bini, for Making History as the First Filipino Pop Group to Perform at the Coachella Valley Music And Arts Festival 2026, and Recognizing their Contribution to the Global Promotion of Filipino Talent and Culture.")	
Philippines	2026	Department of Tourism	Official Tourism Ambassadors	
United States	2026	City of Los Angeles	Certificate of Appreciation	

=== Listicles ===
Publisher	Year	Listicle	Placement	Ref.
&Asian	2025	The 25 Best P-pop Songs of the 21st Century: So Far	3rd ("Lagi"); honorable mention ("Cherry on Top")	
&Asian	2026	10 Songs That Could Be on a Soundtrack to WWE PPV/PLE	Placed ("Zero Pressure")	
Bandwagon Asia	2023	11 Asian Pop Girl Groups You Need to Know	Placed	
Bandwagon Asia	2025	10 Southeast Asian Boy and Girl Bands whose Hits will Awaken your Inner Fangirl	Placed ("Pantropiko")	
Billboard Philippines	2024	Filipino Musicians and Designer Pairings that Can Hold their Own on the Met Gala Carpet	Placed	
Billboard Philippines	2024	12 Christmas Song Covers You Should Listen to This 2024	Placed ("Joy to the World")	
Billboard Philippines	2024	15 Songs to Celebrate Your Graduation to	Placed ("Karera")	
Billboard Philippines	2024	The 50 Best Music Videos of 2024	Placed ("Salamin, Salamin")	
Billboard Philippines	2024	The 50 Best Songs of 2024	Placed ("Salamin, Salamin")	
Billboard Philippines	2024	This Year's Must Have Records	Placed (Born to Win, Feel Good, Talaarawan)	
Billboard Philippines	2024	The 50 Best Albums and EPs of 2024	Placed (Talaarawan)	
Billboard Philippines	2025	The Top Music Releases of 2025 (So Far) — According to Billboard Philippines' Readers	Placed ("Zero Pressure")	
Billboard Philippines	2025	5 P-pop Songs That Could Save the Hon-moon	Placed ("Huwag Muna Tayong Umuwi")	
Billboard Philippines	2025	20 Love Songs That Never Fail To Make Us Swoon – Staff Picks	Placed ("Huwag Muna Tayong Umuwi")	
Billboard Philippines	2025	9 OPM Songs we'd Love to See Translated into The Sims' Simlish Language	Placed ("Salamin, Salamin")	
Billboard Philippines	2025	13 Halloween Costume Ideas Inspired by Your Favorite OPM Artists	Placed ("Maloi Ricalde")	
Billboard Philippines	2025	8 Underrated Bini Songs You Should Listen to Right Now	Placed	
Billboard Philippines	2025	8 Iconic Musicians Who Came from 'Pinoy Big Brother'	Placed ("Gwen, Sheena")	
Billboard Philippines	2025	Favorite Albums of 2025	Placed (Flames)	
Billboard Philippines	2025	Favorite Songs of 2025	Placed ("First Luv")	
Billboard Philippines	2025	25 Best Filipino Albums and EPs of 2025	Placed (Flames)	
Billboard Philippines	2025	7 Filipino Songs to Kickstart your New Year Right	Placed ("Bikini")	
Billboard Philippines	2026	The Best Performances of Coachella 2026 (So Far)	Placed	
Billboard Philippines	2026	The Best Music Videos of Q1 2026	Placed ("Unang Kilig")	
Envi Media	2026	Sound Check: Southeast Asian Girl Groups Changing the Face of Global Pop	Placed	
Envi Media	2026	Asian Artists to See at Coachella 2026	Placed	
Envi Media	2026	Sunday Spin: New Releases From Laufey, Bini, Denise Julia, Kehlani, and Simone Ashley	Placed ("Sugar Rush")	
Esquire Philippines	2026	The 100 Most Powerful People in the Philippines: Wielders of Soft Power	Placed	
Forbes	2025	30 Under 30 – Asia – Entertainment & Sports	Placed	
Forbes	2025	10 Song Recommendations If You Love Huntrix's 'Golden' From 'KPop Demon Hunters'	Placed ("Zero Pressure")	
Grammy Awards	2024	12 Rising Girl Groups to Know Now	Placed	
Harper's Bazaar Singapore	2026	The Top Songs to Know from the Asian Artistes Performing at Coachella 2026	Placed	
Hot Press	2025	Hot For 2025: International Acts Set To Make A Splash This Year	Placed	
Manila Bulletin	2025	Favorite OPM albums of 2025	Placed (Flames)	
Philippine Daily Inquirer	2025	P-pop Songs Inspired by Huntrix from 'KPop Demon Hunters'	Placed ("Strings")	
Pop Journal	2024	10 P-pop Tracks that Slayed Our 2024 Playlist	Placed ("Cherry on Top")	
Rolling Stone	2026	20 Acts We Can't Wait to See at Coachella	Placed	
Rolling Stone	2026	Coachella 2026: The 15 Best Moments from Weekend One	Placed	
Rolling Stone Philippines		Filipino Music Videos that Stole The Spotlight in 2024	Placed ("Cherry on Top")	
SunStar Davao	2024	Tatak Noypi (Note: lit. 'Mark of a Filipino', Noypi is a slang term derived from reversing syllables of Pinoy, an informal word for Filipino.): 10 OPM Songs that Defined 2024	Placed ("Cherry on Top")	
SunStar Davao	2024	Tatak Noypi: 10 OPM Songs that Defined 2024	Placed ("Pantropiko")	
Tatler Asia	2025	#SEAPop: 9 Southeast Asian Girl Groups to Follow This 2025	Placed	
Tatler Asia	2025	Most Influential Philippines 2025	Placed (Note: Each member is listed as a separate individual.)	
Tatler Asia	2026	10 SEAPop groups worth listening to	Placed	
TC Candler	2024	100 Most Beautiful Faces	Placed ("Aiah")	
TC Candler	2025	100 Most Beautiful Faces	Placed ("Aiah")	
Teen Vogue	2024	12 Girl Groups to Watch in 2024	Placed	
Teen Vogue	2026	The Coachella 2026 Outfits From Weekend 1 You Absolutely Must See	Placed	
The Filipino Times	2024	The OFW Playlist: OPM Songs that OFWs can Listen to	Placed ("Huwag Muna Tayong Umuwi")	
Vice	2026	Must-See Pop Stars You Should Definitely Have on Your 2026 Coachella Weekend Schedule	Placed	
Vogue	2026	The Best Celebrity Coachella Outfits of 2026 So Far	Placed	
Vogue Singapore	2026	All the Electric Beauty Moments at Coachella 2026	Placed ("Maloi")	
Vulture	2026	The Breakout Stars Who Won Coachella	Placed	
