= Biniversus =

Philippine web television variety show

- Title card
- Presented by: Bini
- Opening theme: Out of my Head
- Ending theme: Out of my Head
- Country of origin: Philippines
- Original language: Filipino
- No. of episodes: 8

Production
- Executive producers: Carlo L. Katigbak; Cory Vidanes; Laurenti Dyogi; Eugenio Lopez III
- Camera setup: Multi-camera setup
- Running time: 28–36 minutes

Original release
- Network: YouTube
- Release: May 28 – July 16, 2025

Biniversus (stylized as BINIversus) is a Philippine web variety show hosted by Filipino girl group Bini. The show premiered on May 28, 2025, marked Bini's first variety program, featuring unscripted moments. The show is streaming on YouTube only.

The show's first episode garnered over half a million views on YouTube.

== Premise ==
The show's is goal to feature exclusive bloopers and unseen "candid" moments of the group, with the members taking on roles as both game masters and challengers in various friendly competitions that highlight their bond and individual personalities.

Released on their official YouTube channel every Wednesday, each episode showcases the members' individual interests, such as beauty, comedy, travel, and more.

== Cast ==
- Aiah
- Colet
- Maloi
- Gwen
- Stacey
- Mikha
- Jhoanna
- Sheena
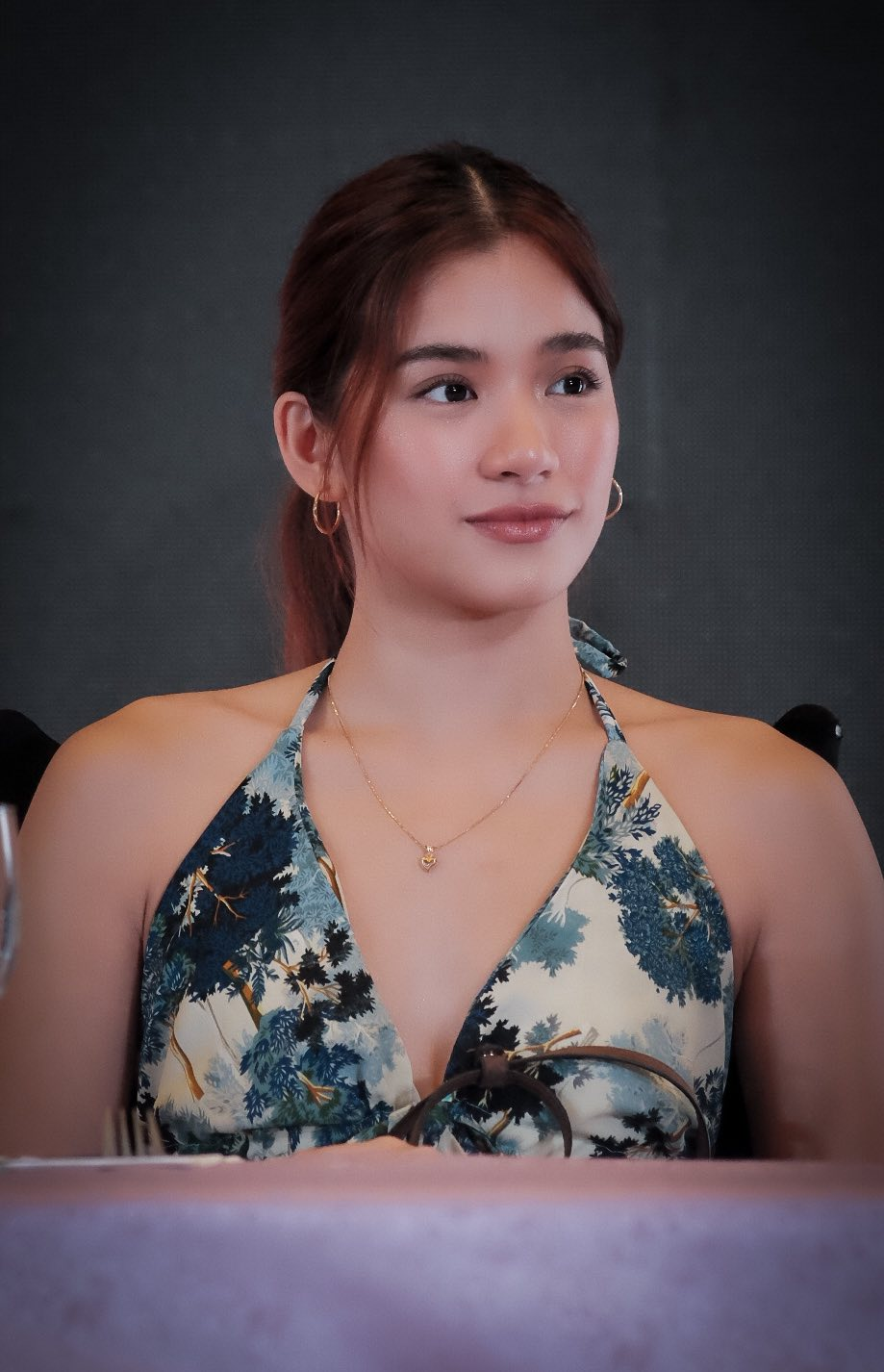
  Aiah
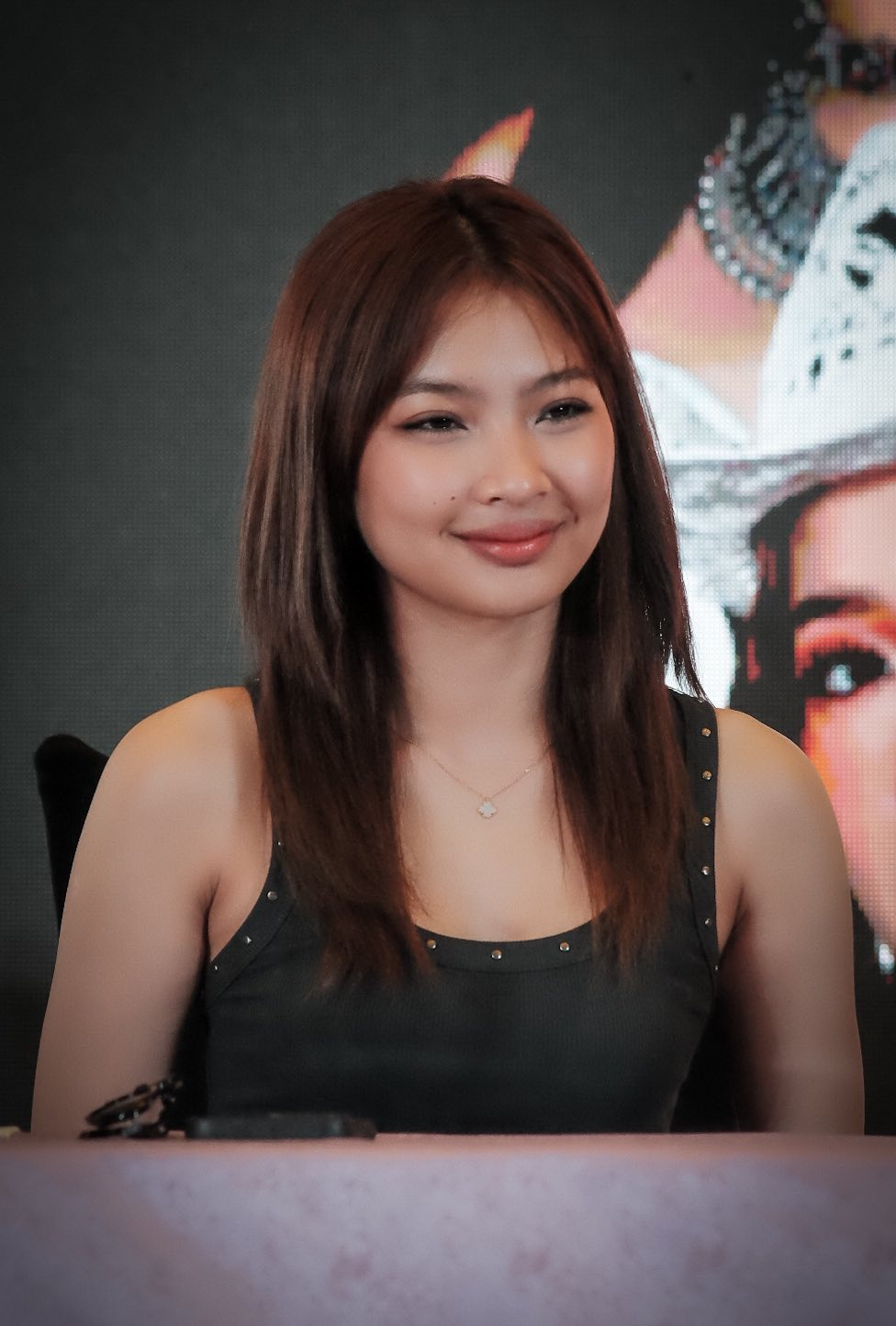
  Colet
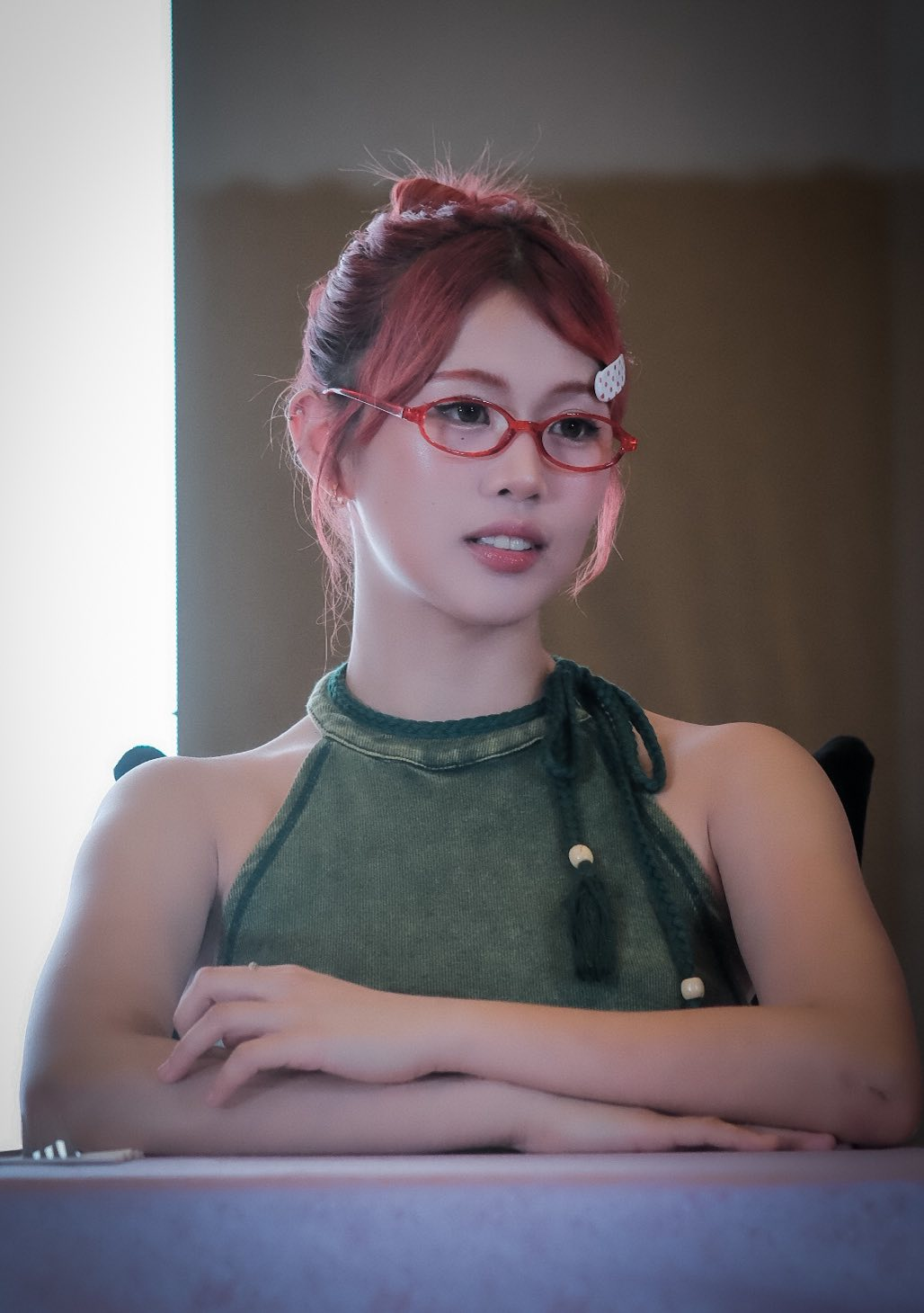
  Maloi
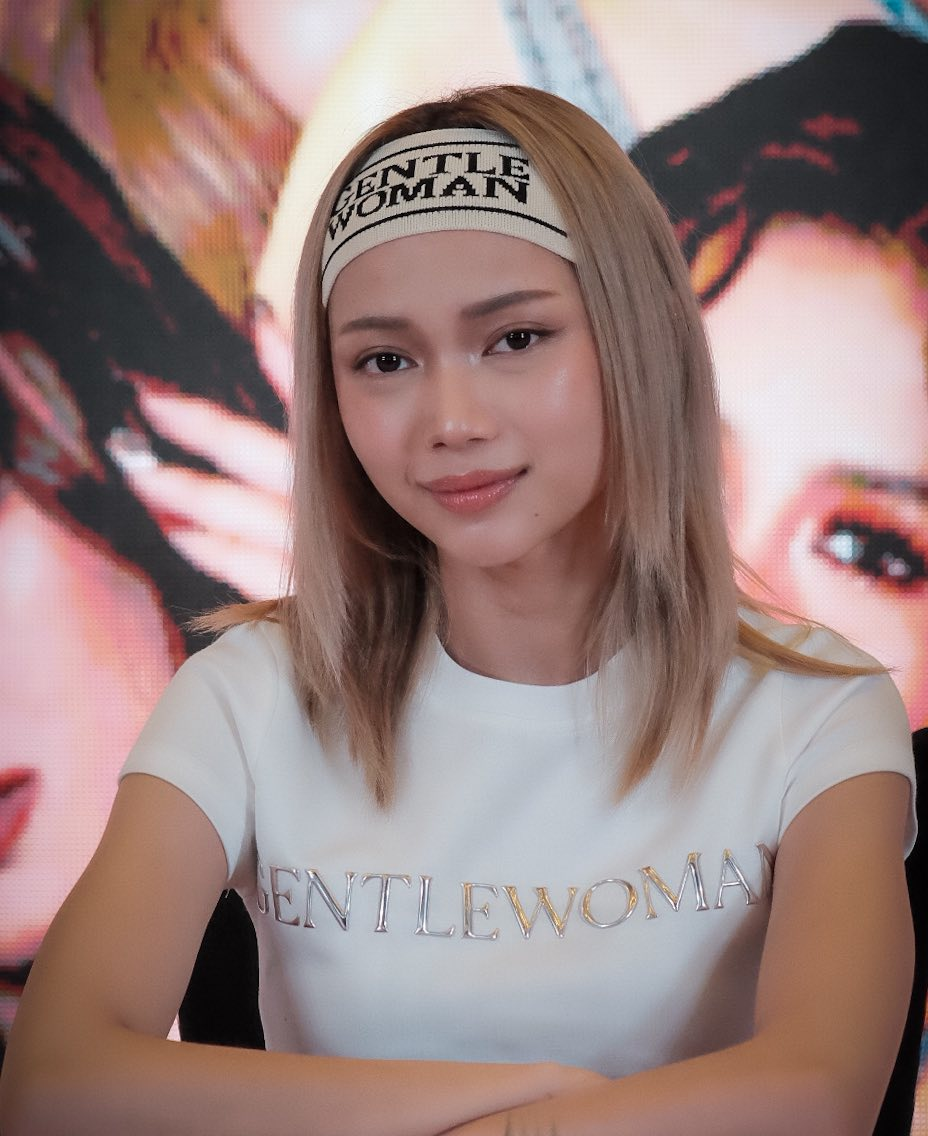
  Gwen
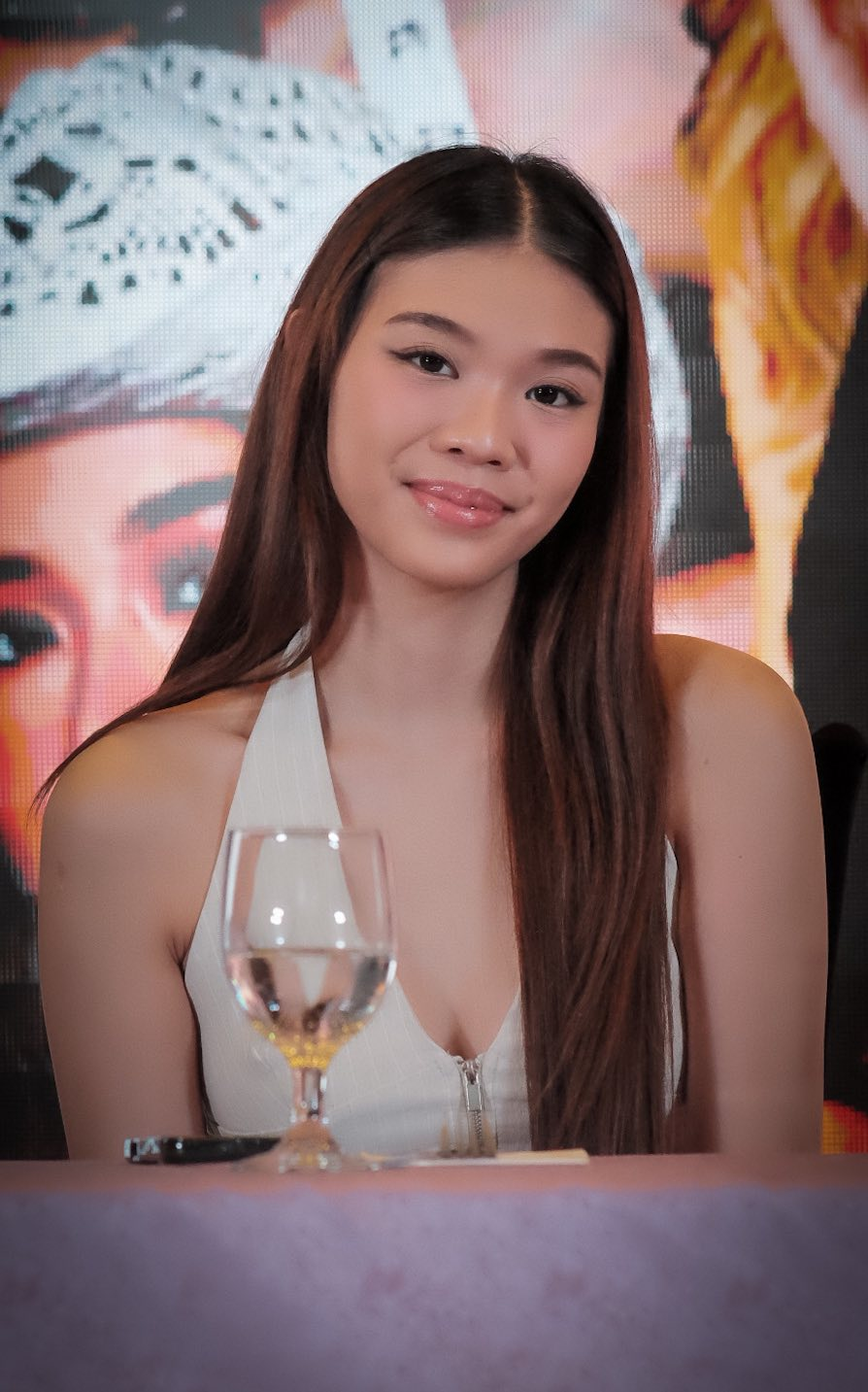
  Stacey
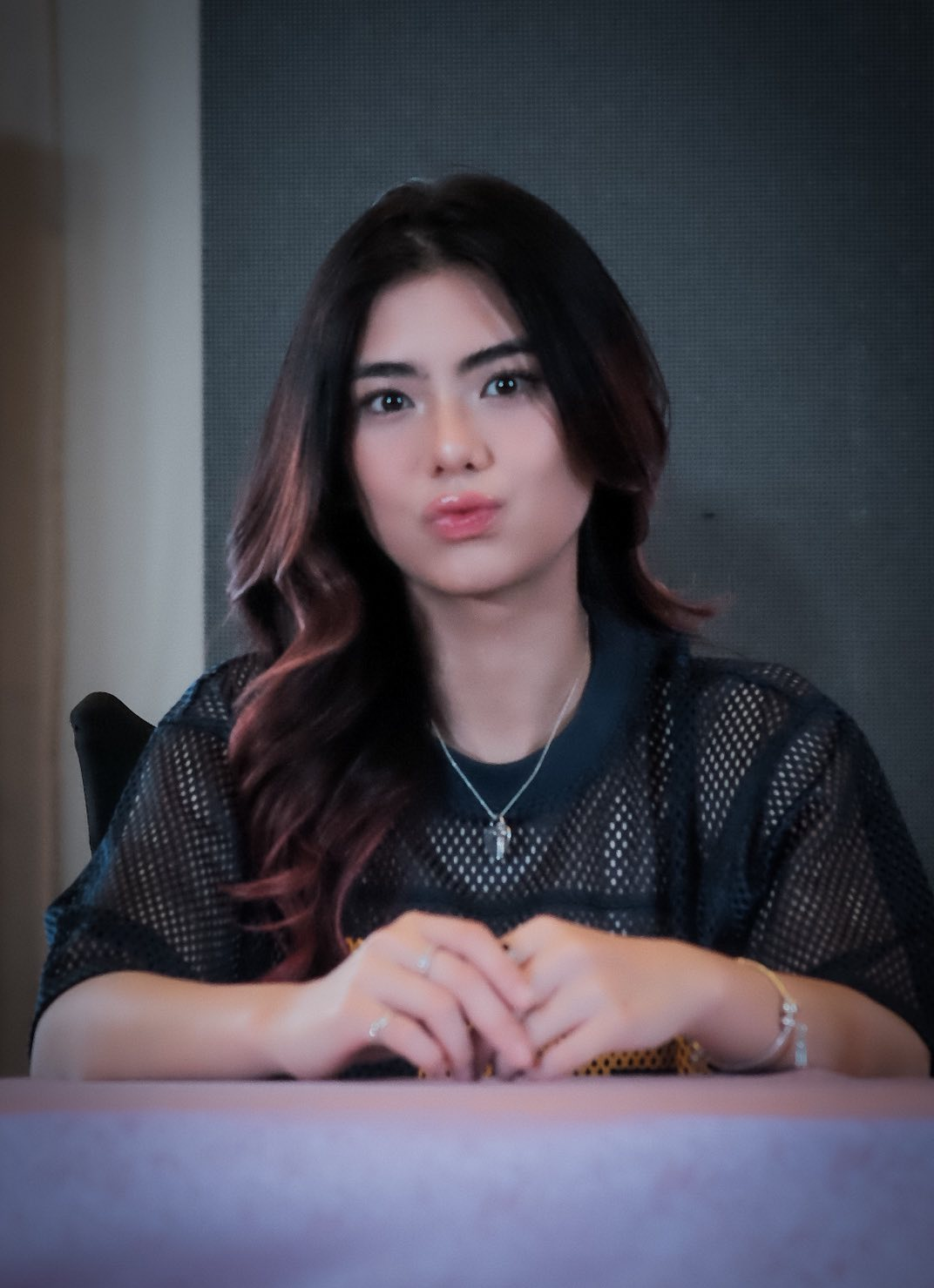
  Mikha
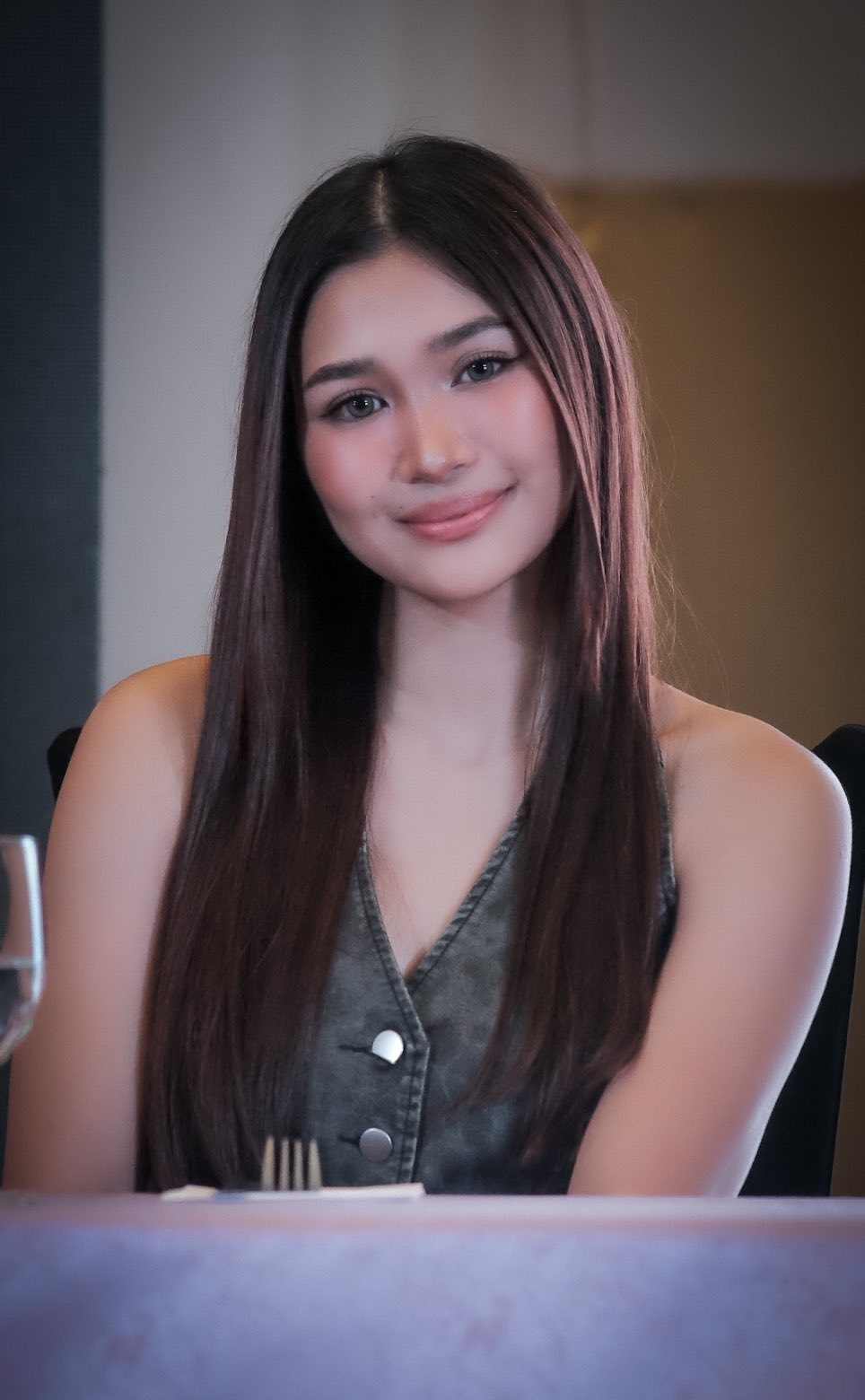
  Jhoanna
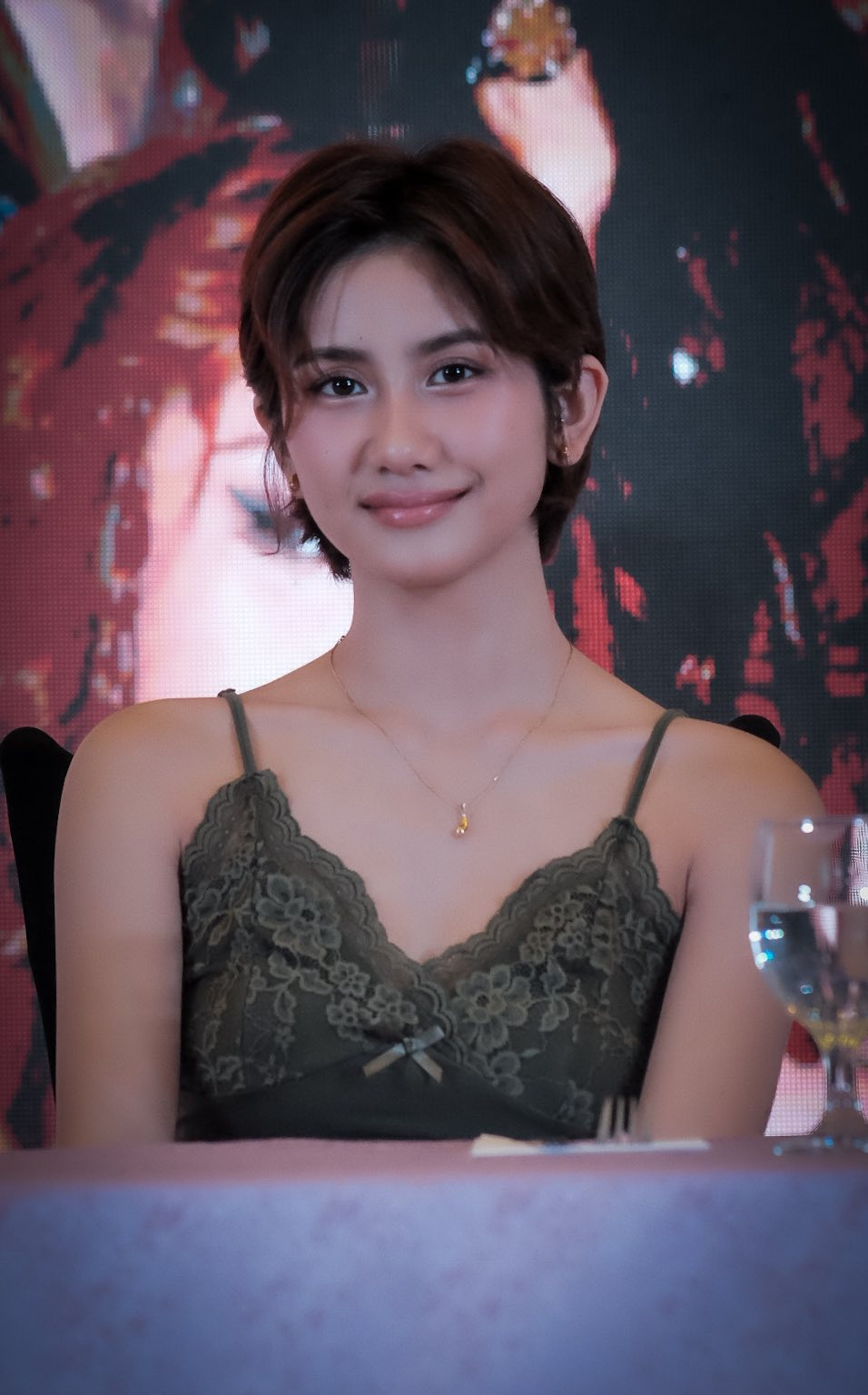
  Sheena

== Episodes ==
No.	Title	Original release date
1	"Tanggal (Note: transl. Detach) Colet Course"	May 28, 2025
The episode opens with Bini's song "Out of My Head", followed by a game segment led by Colet, who served as the game master. She introduced a challenge called "Simple on the LED Wall", in which players had 15 seconds to mimic poses displayed on an LED screen, inspired by the American game show Hole in the Wall. Five players—Jhoanna, Sheena, Maloi, Stacey, and Mikha advanced to the next round. The second game, titled "Aslom" (lit. 'Sour'), required five players to say a Bisaya phrase while eating sour candies, maintaining their fiercest facial expression within 20 seconds. Sheena, Jhoanna, and Maloi advanced to the final round. The last game was called "Scare Me Not", where each contestant participated in a surprise confessional session. During their confessions, they were subjected to jump scares, and the player who reacted the least was declared the winner. Jhoanna won the final challenge.
2	"Maloiconic Battle"	June 4, 2025
Maloi Ricalde takes on the role of game master for the fashion and arts-themed episode. The first challenge, "Design Your Tote bag Challenge" has each player decorating their tote bags with random accessories in just ten minutes. Sheena, Gwen, Aiah, Stacey, and Colet win the first round. The second is the "Blind Drawing Challenge", where five players draw on whiteboards while not staring to the whiteboards, following Maloi's instructions. Colet, Aiah, and Sheena won the second challenge. In the final round, "Upcycled Couture Challenge", three players create outfits using newspapers and Sunsilk sachets, assisted by the previously eliminated contestants. They're give only five minutes to complete their look. Sheena wins the last challenge.
3	"Gwen's Beauty Brawl"	June 11, 2025
Gwen, is the game master in this beauty and glam-themed episode. The first challenge called "Blindfold Make-up Challenge", in which players 5 minutes to do their own make-up while blindfolded. Five players—Aiah, Sheena, Maloi, Stacey, and Mikha advanced to the next round while Jhoanna and Colet became Gwen's assistants/co-hosts (Note: Gwen chooses Colet and Jhoanna as her co-hosts as she is still recovering from her wisdom tooth extraction.). The second challenge, "Speed Nail Art Challenge", five players will have 10 minutes to do their own nail art and describe their creation in 1 word. Sheena, Mikha, and Aiah advanced to the final round. The last round called "Beauty Vlogger", where each player will be doing a make-up vlog for 3 minutes. Aiah won the final challenge.
4	"Aiahmazing Adventures"	June 18, 2025
This episode is a travel-themed episode with Aiah as the game master. In the first challenge "Aiah's World Tour Challenge", Aiah will ask questions that are related to her travels. The player who runs to the buzzer and answers the question correctly advances to the next round. Mikha, Stacey, Jhoanna, Sheena and Gwen advanced to the next round. In the second challenge called "Travel Logic", Aiah will ask a question on what to bring if she would go to a particular country. Each player will have 1 minute to choose from random things and they will defend it. Stacey, Maloi and Mikha made it to the next round. The final challenge is "Aiah-musing Q&A". Each player will be asked a particular question like in a beauty pageant. Maloi won the game.
5	"Spec-Staku-lar Showdown"	June 25, 2025
This is a style and glam-themed episode. Stacey, who is known for her stylish persona is the episode's game master.
6	"Mikhalympics"	July 2, 2025
Mikha, known as varsity player in cheerdance and volleyball is the game master in this sports-themed episode. The first round is "Cheer Try-out", where all members will have 5 minutes to make a cheer. They will perform it as a group and Mikha will randomly pick a player to perform her solo cheer. Jhoanna, Aiah, Stacey, Maloi and Sheena wins the first round. In the second round "Shoot the Candy", the players will transfer a gummy bear from a big bowl to a bottle using a straw for 3 minutes. Maloi (with 9 gummy bears), Aiah (with 6 gummy bears) and Sheena (with 3 gummy bears) wins the second round. In the final round "Jackstone Premium", each player will play Jackstone for 2 minutes. But instead of the usual small ball used in playing, they will use a volleyball. Maloi won the final round, marking her second BINIVersus win.
7	"Jhournalism"	July 9, 2025
Being a student-journalist during her school days, Jhoanna is the newscast-themed episode's game master. In the first round called "Surprise M.O.S. (Man on the Studio)", each member will do a live interview with a random person inside the studio. Aiah, Maloi, Mikha, Sheena and Stacey wins the first round. The second round is "Fill In the Blanks". In this round, they will read a news report, and they will fill in a blank item with a random word or phrase. Maloi, Sheena and Stacey advances to the final round which is "Developing Story". In the final round, they will do a news report, by explaining old videos that are rigged using artificial intelligence. Stacey wins the final round.
8	"Stand-Up Sheenanigans"	July 16, 2025
Sheena is the game master, known for her funny and bubbly personality, her theme is more on chaos and fun. The first challenge "Girls Over Flour". The players will have 3 minutes to transfer a flour using a photo card with their mouth. While doing this, Sheena is telling jokes. The player with the most flour will advance to the next round. Mikha (with 397 grams of flour), Gwen (with 514 grams), Stacey (with 327 grams), Colet (with 450 grams) and Aiah (with 350 grams) advances to the next round. However, Sheena decided that all players will advance to the next, due to the fact that some players would use hands in transferring the flour. In the second round "Punny Joke Challenge", Sheena will give one word to each player. The player will give 3 jokes using the word given to them in 5 minutes. The 3 funniest jokes will proceed to the final round. Colet, Stacey, and Mikha won the challenge, but as for the first round, all players proceeded to the final round called "Sheena Mo 'To" (Note: Inspired from It's Showtime segment "Sine Mo 'To.). Sheena will be telling a story while the players will act on it. Jhoanna won the final challenge (Note: Initially, Mikha won the final challenge, but she refused to be the winner, resulting to Jhoanna, as she was about to cry became the winner afterwards).
