= Bini Docuseries =

Philippine documentary television series

- Promotional poster
- Genre: Documentary; Miniseries
- Written by: Jeff Canoy
- Directed by: Jet Leyco
- Country of origin: Philippines
- Original languages: Filipino; English

Production
- Producers: iWantTFC; ABS-CBN News and Current Affairs
- Running time: 62–89 minutes

Original release
- Network: iWantTFC
- Release: September 26, 2024 – June 12, 2025

Bini Docuseries is a Philippine documentary television series that explores the rise of the Filipino girl group Bini. The documentary provides an in-depth look at the group's journey leading up to their first solo concert, Biniverse.

== Background ==
The documentary focuses on a pivotal period for Bini, including their preparation for Biniverse, a three-night concert held at the New Frontier Theater in Quezon City. The series sheds light on the group's journey and the milestones they achieved in 2024, such as packed mall shows, significant streaming achievements, and a rapidly growing fanbase. The announcement for the documentary was revealed at the final leg of a three-stop nationwide tour by the group in General Santos on July 20.

The documentary is produced by iWantTFC and ABS-CBN News and Current Affairs. The series offers exclusive behind-the-scenes footage and interviews with the members, highlighting their experiences and challenges in the lead-up to what became their first solo concert.

This was also the joint reunion project between the news and entertainment divisions of ABS-CBN since I Dare You, and the first feature-length documentary produced by ABS-CBN News and Current Affairs since 2021.

== Cast ==
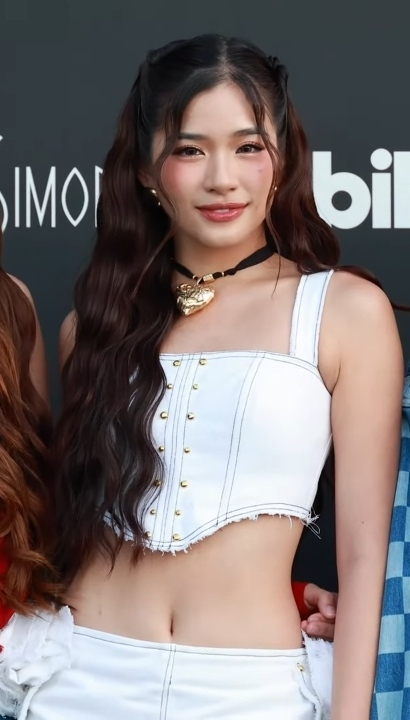
Aiah

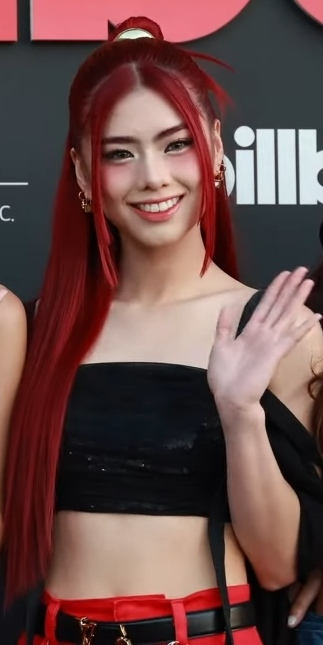
Mikha

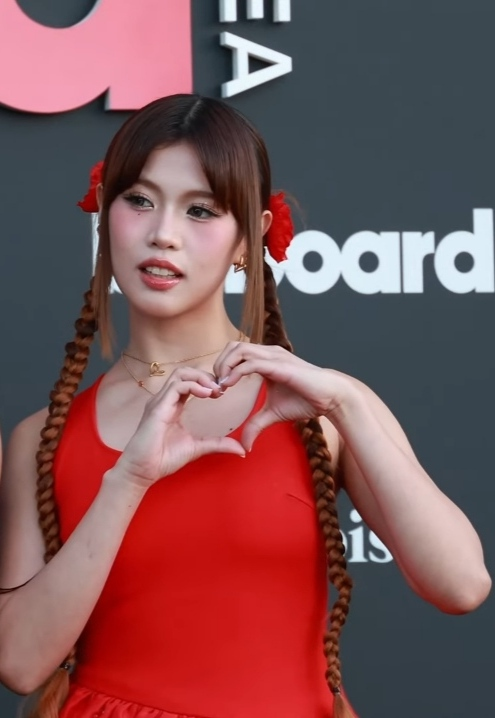
Maloi

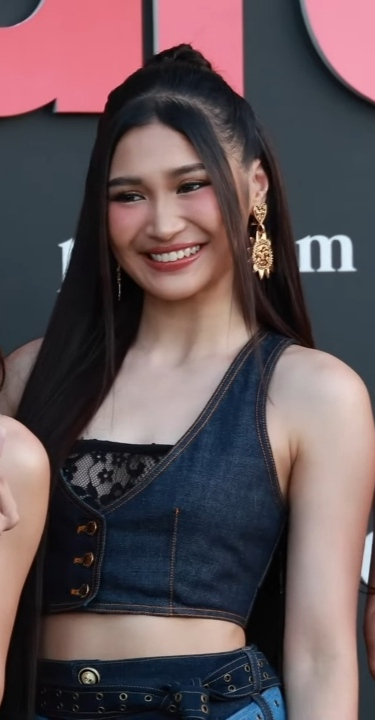
Jhoanna

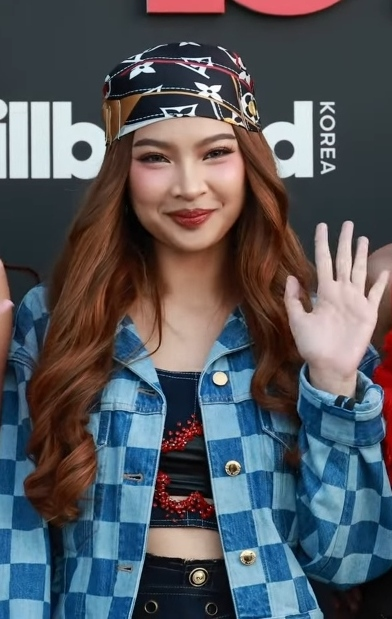
Colet

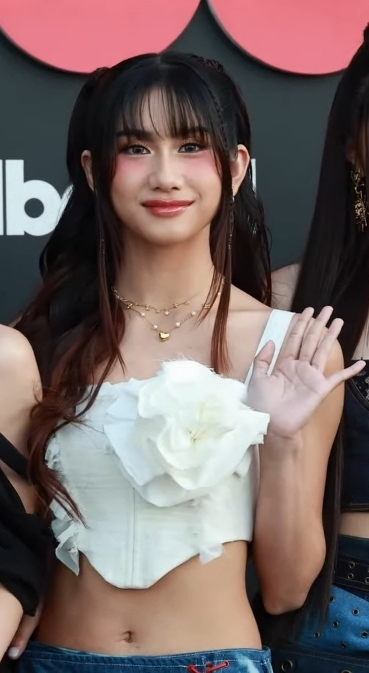
Sheena

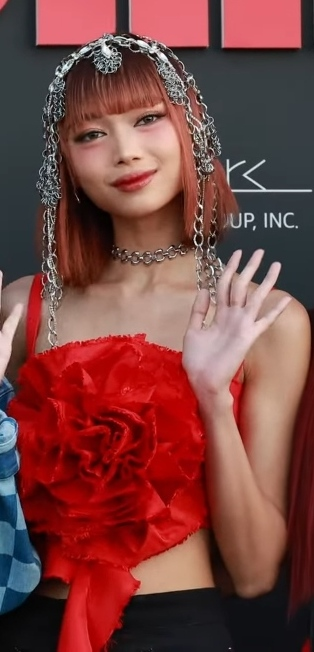
Gwen

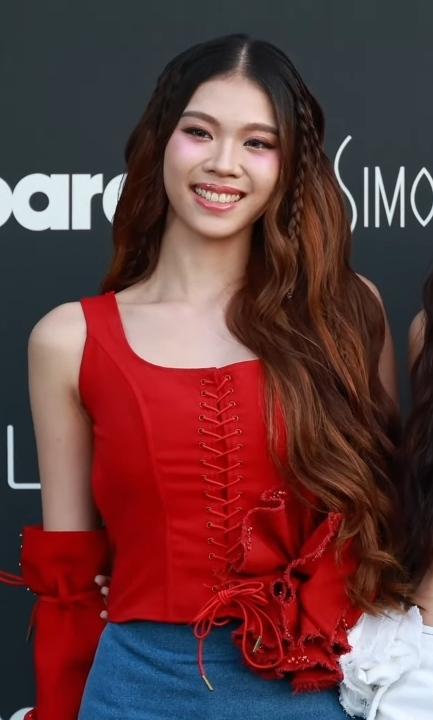
Stacey

- Aiah
- Mikha
- Maloi
- Jhoanna
- Colet
- Sheena
- Gwen
- Stacey

== Episodes ==
No.	Title	Original release date
1	"Chapter 1: Born to Win"	September 26, 2024
It features the origins of the group and its members as well as the initial years following Bini's formation, including significant events such as the COVID-19 pandemic, the shutdown of ABS-CBN, and the group's rise to prominence following the release of their song "Pantropiko" leading towards the preparations for the Biniverse concert and the concert itself. It also deals with events concerning individual members, including the death of Sheena's mother before their group's debut, and Aiah suffering from anxiety during the Biniverse concert.
2	"Chapter 2: Here With You"	November 8, 2024
At the regional leg of the Biniverse tour, the girls face allegations of snubbing the public at an airport, while Jhoanna has a medical emergency at the end of a concert. The girls’ relatives give their views on raising their children.
3	"Chapter 3: Hanggang Dulo"	June 12, 2025
Bini goes to the United States and Canada as part of the overseas leg of the Biniverse tour, but Jhoanna is delayed back in the Philippines after falling ill again.

== Production ==
At the advanced screening for Born to Win, the film's co-creator, Jeff Canoy announced that work for the second part of the trilogy, titled Here With You and covering the regional leg of the Biniverse tour, was underway.

== Release ==
The documentary series was originally scheduled for release on September 8, 2024, on the streaming platform iWantTFC but was later moved to September 26, 2024. Here With You was released on November 8, 2024. Hanggang Dulo was released on June 12, 2025.

== Marketing ==
An advanced screening for select fans was held on September 23 at the Gateway Cineplex in Quezon City, which was also attended by Bini members Colet, Maloi, Mikha, and Jhoanna. At the Dubai leg of the Biniverse World Tour 2025 in May, a teaser was released for the final part of the trilogy, titled Hanggang Dulo (transl. Until the End), which covers the Biniverse concerts in the United States, Canada and the Araneta Coliseum.

== Accolades ==
Awards and nominations for "Bini Chapter 1: Born to Win"Awards and nominations for Bini Chapter 1: Born to Win
Award	Year	Category	Result	Ref.
New York Festivals	2025	Best Documentary: Biography/Profiles	Nominated	
Pinoy Rebyu Awards	2025	Best Documentary Feature	Nominated	

Awards and nominations for "Bini Chapter 3: Hanggang Dulo"Awards and nominations for Bini Chapter 3: Hanggang Dulo
Award	Year	Category	Result	Ref.
KBP Golden Dove Awards	2026	Best Special Program	Won	
