= Jeff Canoy =

Filipino broadcast journalist and documentarian

- Born: Jefry Corullo Canoy; August 6, 1984 (age 42); Manila, Philippines
- Education: AB Communication
- Alma mater: Ateneo de Manila University
- Occupations: Journalist; Broadcaster; News reporter
- Employer: ABS-CBN News and Current Affairs
- Known for: Anchor of Red Alert, Sakto, TV Patrol Express, and Kasalo
- Television: Patrol ng Pilipino; Red Alert; Umagang Kay Ganda; Sakto; Kasalo; "#NoFilter"; TV Patrol Express

Jefry "Jeff" Corullo Canoy (Tagalog pronunciation: [ˈkanoɪ]; born August 6, 1984) is a Filipino journalist and documentary filmmaker who covers armed conflicts, disasters, law enforcement and defense. He is currently the Chief of Reporters for ABS-CBN News and Current Affairs and news anchor of TV Patrol Express.

Canoy is recognized as a multi-awarded Filipino journalist. In recent years, some of his wins includes a Gold World Medal (2018) and Bronze World Medal (2020) at the New York Festivals TV and Film Awards, a Gold Dolphin at the 2018 Cannes Corporate Media and TV Awards and First Prize in the English Essay category at the 2018 Carlos Palanca Memorial Awards for Literature. In 2024, Canoy won the Digital Transformation Award at the Asia-Pacific Broadcasting+ Innovation awards for his work on Patrol Ng Pilipino.

== Education ==
Canoy attended elementary school at Lourdes School of Quezon City before moving to the United States. He completed his middle school education at the Redland Middle School and is a high school graduate of Col. Zadok Magruder High School in Rockville, Maryland. He earned his Bachelor of Arts degree in Communication from the Ateneo de Manila University where he also received the Raul Locsin Award for Student Journalism for his publications work for The GUIDON and Katipunan Magazine.

== Career ==
Canoy began his career in journalism as intern and production assistant in 2006. In 2007, he became a reporter for ABS-CBN News. He ventured into television documentary in the ABS-CBN Current Affairs program Patrol ng Pilipino in 2010.

In 2017, Canoy replaced Atom Araullo (who transferred to GMA Network in September of that year) as host of Red Alert, part of the Pinoy True Stories series of public affairs programs, centering on disaster preparedness and education. He was awarded the Best Public Affairs Host from the KBP Golden Dove Awards the following year while the show won Best Public Affairs Program.

In 2018, Canoy's documentary on the Marawi siege with fellow journalist Chiara Zambrano, Di Ka Pasisiil (Never Shall Be Conquered), won the Gold World Medal at the 2018 New York Festivals. The documentary also won the first Gold Dolphin Award for the Philippines in Cannes Corporate Media & TV Awards. The documentary also won the Creative Excellence Certificate from US International Film Festival, Best Documentary at the Gawad Tanglaw Awards and Best Documentary at the 31st PMPC Star Awards for Television.

The same year, Canoy also became a finalist for Excellence in Explanatory Writing at the Society of Publishers in Asia Awards for his multimedia piece, Buhay Pa Kami (We Are Still Alive): Dispatches from Marawi. Canoy also won first prize in the English Essay Category of the Carlos Palanca Memorial Awards for the same story.

In 2018, he was named a Marshall McLuhan Fellow – a journalism award conferred by the Canadian Embassy in Manila, becoming the youngest recipient of the award at the time.

In 2019, Red Alert won another two awards at the 27th Golden Dove Awards: Best Public Service Announcement and Best Documentary Program.

In the same year, Canoy joined ABS-CBN’s morning news program, Umagang Kay Ganda until the show's final broadcast on May 5, 2020.

In 2020, Canoy's documentary on people with different called Tao Po? (Is Anybody Home?) earned the Bronze World Medal at the 2021 New York Festivals. His documentary on the lone female fighter in the Battle of Balangiga during the Philippine-American War titled Ang Babae ng Balangiga (The Woman of Balangiga) was also named a finalist. His piece about the underlying effect of measles ("Tigdas") for Red Alert was also a finalist.

In the same year, Canoy was one of the news anchors of TeleRadyo's relaunched morning news program Sakto along with Amy Perez and Johnson Manabat until the show's final broadcast on June 29, 2023.

In 2023, Canoy was named as one of the anchors of DWPM's Kasalo, marking his return to AM Radio after three years. Canoy bid farewell to the program at the end of the year to focus on his reportorial work. Canoy was later named as the news anchor for TV Patrol Express.

In 2024, Canoy co-created the documentary Bini Chapter 1: Born To Win, which revolves around the Pinoy pop group Bini and is the first installment of a three-part docuseries about the group produced by ABS-CBN News and Current Affairs and iWantTFC. The documentary was named a finalist at the 2025 New York Festivals.

== Filmography ==
=== Documentaries ===
2025	Tinik sa West Philippine Sea (upcoming)	Documentarian	
	BINI Chapter Three: Hanggang Dulo (upcoming)	Documentarian	
	Alex Eala's Big Break	Executive Producer	
	From Hong Kong to The Hague: The Arrest of Rodrigo Roa Duterte	Executive Producer	
2024	BINI Chapter Two: Here With You	Documentarian	
	BINI Chapter One: Born To Win	Documentarian	2025 New York Festivals, Finalist Nominee, Best Documentary, 5th Pinoy Rebyu Awards
2020	Breaking The News (NHK)	Producer	
	Ang Pagbabalik Ng Ibong Adarna (The Return of Ibong Adarna)	Documentarian	
2019	Ang Babae ng Balangiga (The Woman of Balangiga)	Documentarian	2020 New York Festivals, Finalist Special Citation for Best Documentary, 41st Catholic Mass Media Awards
2017	Paglayang Minamahal (Beloved Freedom)	Documentarian	Best Documentary Special, PMPC Star Awards
	Di Ka Pasisiil (Never Shall Be Conquered)	Documentarian	2018 New York Festivals, Gold World Medal 2018 Cannes Corporate and TV Media Awards Creative Excellence Certificate, US International Film Festival Best Documentary Special, PMPC Star Awards
2014	Finding Fault	Documentarian	

=== #NoFilter Documentaries (2019-2020) ===
2020	Quarantine	
	Araw Na Walang Araw (A Day Without The Sun)	
	Rule No. 1	
	Sanlibong Salita (A Thousand Words)	
	Tala Nation	
2019	Tao Po (Is Anybody Home?)	2020 New York Festivals, Bronze World Medal
	Reyna Sa Laro Ng Mga Hari (A Queen in a King's Sport)	
	Kawalan (Loss)	
	Pigil Hininga (Hold Your Breath)	
	Lipad JP Lipad (Fly JP Fly)	
	Tatlong Bituin Sa Hilaga (Three Stars in The North)	
	Dito Na Lang Muna (Here For Now)	
	'Wag Ka Nang Umiyak (Don't Cry)	
