= Dwta =

Filipino singer and songwriter

dwta
- Born: Jhasmine Espinas Villanueva; April 16, 2001 (age 25)
- Origin: Tiwi, Albay
- Genre: Folk pop
- Occupations: Singer, songwriter
- Years active: 2021–present
- Label: Sony Music Philippines
- Website: https://dwta.twoelevensph.com/

Jhasmine Espinas Villanueva, (born April 16, 2001) professionally known as dwta, is a Filipino singer and songwriter born and raised in Albay, Bicol Region. She is known for her tracks "Padaba Taka" and "Santigwar".

She is known for incorporating her mother tongue, Bikol, in her songs.

== Early life and education ==
Jhasmine Espinas Villanueva was born and raised in the Bicol Region, hailing specifically from Tiwi, Albay. Before delving in songwriting, Villanueva was involved in other forms of art like dancing and never expected to pursue music until senior high school year when she was invited to join a songwriting workshop after jamming with friends at an event.

Villanueva initially wrote songs in Filipino before finding more comfort to making songs in her native language Bikol after joining a Bikol-language songwriting competition.

She attended the Meridian International Business, Arts and Technology College (MINT College) pursuing a degree in music business management.

== Career ==
Dwta gained recognition for her traditional music with contemporary genres. Her lyrics, often written in her native language, celebrate Filipino heritage and promote linguistic pride. She signed with Sony Music Philippines and adopted the stage name "dwta". The name is derived from the combination of the Filipino words "diwa" (spirit) and "tala" (star) which she deliberately chose for its Filipino-ness. She released her debut single, "Daluyong" (Waves) in 2021, marking the beginning of her professional music career.

Her career continued to flourish in 2023 when she joined the Coke Studio Philippines Season 7 lineup. This notable collaboration series brings together diverse Filipino artists wherein dwta collaborated with the P-pop group Alamat for the song "Kapit" (Hold).

The following year, in 2024, Dwta was part of the prestigious Wanderland Festival, an annual music event in the Philippines that features both local and international artists. At Wanderland, she shared the stage with global acts like Hwasa and Thundercat, marking another major milestone in her career. That same year, she was featured as one of the Spotify Radar artists for Class 2024, an initiative aimed at supporting emerging talent. Dwta's inclusion in the program, alongside fellow rising stars like BINI, Maki, and Cup of Joe.

Dwta's achievements have been marked by both critical acclaim and commercial success. In 2022, she received her first Awit Award nomination for her song "Panganoron" (Heavenly). The following year, she won her first Awit Award for "Padaba Taka" (I Love You), which became a breakout hit.

Her earlier song "Santigwar" also made waves, reaching #2 on the Spotify Viral 50 Philippines chart in 2022 and was nominated for Best Regional Recording at the Awit Awards, alongside Padaba Taka. She was also honored with a nomination for Listener's Choice at the inaugural Billboard Philippines Women in Music which celebrates the achievements of female artists in the Philippines.

In 2025, Dwta released "Kung Ikaw ay Masaya" (If You Are Happy) as the official soundtrack for the comedy film Flower Girl, starring Sue Ramirez. The same year marked a significant moment in her career as she received two major recognitions: New Artist of the Year at the New Hue Music Video Awards, and Folk Song of the Year for "Sampung mga Daliri" featuring Justin at the inaugural Filipino Music Awards. During this period, she also began composing songs for other artists, notably co-writing BINI's single "First Luv".

== Accolades ==
Award	Year	Category	Notable Work	Result	Ref.
Awit Awards	2022	Best Regional Recording	Panganoron	Nominated	
Awit Awards	2023	Best Regional Recording	Santigwar	Nominated	
Awit Awards	2023	Best Regional Recording	Padaba Taka	Won	
Billboard Philippines Women in Music	2024	Listener's Choice	Delikado	Nominated	
Awit Awards	2024	Best Regional Recording	Delikado	Nominated	
Wish Music Awards	2025	Wishclusive Contemporary Folk Performance of the Year	Padaba Taka	Nominated	
Wish Music Awards	2025	Breakthrough Artist of the Year	dwta	Nominated	
New Hue Music Video Awards	2025	New Artist of the Year	dwta	Won	
Filipino Music Awards	2025	Folk Song of the Year	Sampung Mga Daliri	Won	
Awit Awards	2025	Best Engineered Recording	Pauwi Na'Ko	Nominated	
Awit Awards	2025	Best Performance by a Solo Artist	Pauwi Na'Ko	Nominated	
Awit Awards	2025	Best Traditional/Contemporary Folk Recording	Huling Liham (with Paham)	Nominated	
Billboard Philippines Women in Music	2026	Listener's Choice	Nasusunog (Pants On Fire)	Nominated	
New Hue Music Video Awards	2026	Female Artist of the Year	dwta	Pending	
Awit Awards	2026	Best Performance by a Solo Artist	Nasusunog (Pants On Fire)	Nominated	
Awit Awards	2026	Best Pop Recording	Langit Lupa	Nominated	
Awit Awards	2026	Best Cover Art	Langit Lupa	Nominated	

== Discography ==
=== Extended play (EP) ===
Title	EP details	Ref.
dwta: MINT Studio Sessions	Released: November 29, 2023; Label: dwta, exclusively distributed by Sony Music Entertainment PH	
Kamay Mo'y Nasan Na	Released: February 12, 2025; Label: Sony Music Entertainment PH	
Magka-ibigan: Mga Kabanata	Released: December 19, 2025; Label: Sony Music Entertainment PH	

=== Singles ===
==== As a lead artist ====
Title	Year	Album	Composer	Producer	Ref.
Daluyong	2021	Non-album singles	Jhasmine Villanueva (dwta)	JP Lanuza	
An Satuyang Istorya	2021	Non-album singles	Jhasmine Villanueva (dwta)	JP Lanuza	
Kalangitan	2021	Non-album singles	Jhasmine Villanueva (dwta)	Sam d e Leon	
Payapa	2021	Non-album singles	Jhasmine Villanueva (dwta)	Sam d e Leon	
Panganoron	2021	Non-album singles	Jhasmine Villanueva (dwta)	Sam d e Leon	
Mapagbirong Tagpuan	2022	Non-album singles	Jhasmine Villanueva (dwta)	Wahly Zenit	
Santigwar	2022	Non-album singles	Jhasmine Villanueva (dwta)	Wahly Zenit	
Padaba Taka	2022	Non-album singles	Jhasmine Villanueva (dwta)	Brian Lotho	
Delikado	2023	Non-album singles	Jhasmine Villanueva (dwta)	Brian Lotho	
SMP (Samahan ng Malalamig ang Pasko)	2023	Non-album singles	Jhasmine Villanueva (dwta)	Brian Lotho	
Kapit (with ALAMAT)	2024	Non-album singles	MC Einstein and Janine Teñoso	Brian Lotho	
Tahan Na (ft. Arthur Miguel)	2024	Non-album singles	Jhasmine Villanueva (dwta)	Brian Lotho	
Pauwi Na 'Ko (Dito Ka Na Lang)	2024	Non-album singles	Jhasmine Villanueva (dwta)	Brian Lotho	
Di Naman	2024	Non-album singles	Jhasmine Villanueva (dwta)	Brian Lotho	
Sampung Mga Daliri (ft. Justin)	2025	Non-album singles	Jhasmine Villanueva (dwta)	Brian Lotho	
Nasusunog (Pants On Fire)	2025		Jhasmine Villanueva (dwta), Ashley Mehta, Martin Estrada, Tiana Kocher	Martin Estrada, Brian Lotho	
Kung Ikaw Ay Masaya (- From "Flower Girl")	2025		Jhasmine Villanueva (dwta)	Brian Lotho	
Kumilos (ft. Higit sa Pag-Ibig, The Musical)	2025		Jhasmine Villanueva (dwta), Rain Sta. Ana	Jhasmine Villanueva (dwta), Rain Sta. Ana	
Langit Lupa	2025		Jhasmine Villanueva (dwta)	Brian Lotho	
Ang Pag-Ibig Kong Ito	2026		Carlos Agawa, Ernie Dela Peña	Brian Lotho	
Tabi!	2026		Jhasmine Villanueva (dwta)	Brian Lotho, Jhasmine Villanueva (dwta)	
At Kung Sakali (with Arthur Miguel)	2026		Jhasmine Villanueva (dwta), Arthur Miguel	Jhasmine Villanueva (dwta), Arthur Miguel, Luke April; Mixed by: Shadiel Chan; Mastered by: Jan Aried Agadier Fuertez	

==== As a Featured Artist ====
Title	Year	Album	Ref
Lihim (Nuarin Sasabihon) with Arthur Miguel	2023	Non-album single	
Huling Liham with Paham	2024	Paham	

=== Songwriting Credits ===
Title	Artist	Year	Album	Credits	Ref
First Luv	BINI	2025	Flames	Composer	
Kapag Umuulan	Leyo	2025	Non-album Single	Lyricist	

== Filmography ==
=== Music Videos ===
Title	Year	Director	Ref
Santigwar	2022	Elyandre Dagli	
Padaba Taka	2022	Elyandre Dagli	
Panganoron	2023	Ang Tikatik	
SMP (Samahan ng Malalamig ang Pasko)	2023	Elyandre Dagli	
Tahan Na (ft. Arthur Miguel)	2024	Jiggy Gregorio	
Pauwi Na 'Ko	2024	Elyandre Dagli	
dwta series: Magka-Ibigan	2024-2025	Raliug (Lunchbox)	
Sampung Mga Daliri (ft. Justin)	2025	Raliug (Lunchbox)	
Tabi!	2026	Elyandre Dagli	
