= Flames (Bini album) =

Studio album by Bini
- Released: November 20, 2025
- Genres: Bubblegum pop; R&B; soul; hip-hop
- Length: 20:55
- Languages: English; Tagalog
- Label: Star
- Producers: DaviDior; Greg Shilling; Jarlo Bâse; Jurek Reunamäki; Jonathan Manalo; Kajo; Leather Jacket; Lindgren; Jeremy G; Martin Estrada; Tommy Brown

Bini chronology
Biniverse (2025)	Flames (2025)	Signals (2026)

Singles from Flames
- 1. "Shagidi" Released: June 5, 2025; 2. "First Luv" Released: October 2, 2025; 3. "Paruparo" Released: November 6, 2025

Flames (stylized in all caps) is the third studio album by Filipino girl group Bini. It was released on November 20, 2025, by Star Music. It contains seven tracks, of which three were released as singles, "First Luv", "Shagidi", and "Paruparo". It was produced by DaviDior, Greg Shilling, Jarlo Bâse, Jurek Reunamäki, Jonathan Manalo, Kajo, Leather Jacket, Lindgren, Jeremy G, Martin Estrada, and Tommy Brown. The album received mixed reviews from critics, with the Manila Bulletin and Billboard Philippines hailing it as one of the best Philippine albums of 2025 and other critics from Positively Filipino and Esquire Philippines considering it the weakest album of Bini's career so far.

== Background ==
Following the release of "Shagidi", Bini announced that their next single, "First Luv", would be released in October. The group teased the song with a series of concept photos featuring group and individual shots, where the members wore ruffled, corseted pink outfits. On September 16, Coachella officially announced Bini as a part of their 2026 lineup, marking them as the first Filipino act to perform at the festival. The group will perform on April 10 and 17, 2026.

Bini released the single "First Luv" on October 2, 2025, and it serves as their first Tagalog single following a series of all-English tracks such as "Blink Twice" and "Cherry on Top". On the week of October 18, 2025, "First Luv" debuted at number 73 on the Billboard Philippines Hot 100 and is reportedly the only P-pop song on the chart for the week.

== Release ==
Bini has announced the release of their new album, titled Flames. It features a short teaser video with the caption "Do you feel the heat?" The video features a similar aesthetic to their latest single, "First Luv", which was previously released on October 2, 2025. It was teased in an Instagram reel in which the girls are starting to play the Filipino game, FLAMES. Following the release of "First Luv", Bini announced the release of their pre-release single, titled "Paruparo". It was released on November 6, 2025, ahead of the album's release. The album was released on November 20, 2025, under Star Music.

It was announced that the group will hold their concert titled Binified: A Year-End Concert, scheduled for November 29 at the Philippine Arena in Bulacan. They also revealed plans to release a new album featuring English and Filipino tracks, some of which would be performed at the concert.

== Composition ==
The album has been described as reflecting, love, and self-discovery. "Infinity" has been characterized as an expressing the members bond and solidarity, "Katabi" (transl. Beside) conveys longing for someone separated by distance, "Sweet Tooth" addresses affection and desire, "Bikini" describes as confidence and self-love, "First Luv" depicts emotions associated with first love, "Paruparo" (lit. 'Butterfly') highlights growth and healing, and "Shagidi" incorporates hip-hop influences inspired by Filipino childhood games.

== Reception ==
Flames garnered mixed reviews from critics. Billboard Philippines' Rome Saenz called Flames both youthful and polished, with the magazine naming it as one of 2025's best Philippine albums. Ian Ureta of Manila Bulletin hailed the album as a turning point for Bini musically, praising them for "finally choosing bravery over safety". Conversely, Julienne Loreto of Positively Filipino called it Bini's weakest album so far, considering their subsequent EP Signals to be a "massive" improvement, although they did praise the Flames tracks "First Luv" and "Shagidi". Likewise, John Patrick "Joker" Manio of Esquire Philippines deemed Flames as Bini's worst album so far.

== Awards and nominations ==
Award	Year (Note: Indicates the year of the ceremony. Each year is linked to the article about the awards held that year, wherever possible.)	Category	Result	Ref.
SEC Awards	2026	International Album/EP of the Year	Pending	

== Track listing ==
Flames track listing
No.	Title	Writer(s)	Producer(s)	Length
1.	"First Luv"	Dwta; Kajo; Kiana Valenciano; Rosemarie Tan; Shan Pooviriyakul	Kajo	2:56
2.	"Sweet Tooth"	Jurek Reunamäki; Kyra Fields; Lindgren; Melanie Joy Fontana	Lindgren; Reunamäki	3:00
3.	"Paruparo"	Dana Balagtas; Jhoanna Robles; Jonathan Manalo; Mikha Lim; Stacey Sevilleja	Jonathan Manalo	3:32
4.	"Infinity"	Ishiro Incapas; Jeremy Eriq Glinoga; Russu Laurente	Jeremy G	3:55
5.	"Katabi"	Ace Banzuelo; Jarlo Bâse; Julius; Martin Estrada	Bâse; Estrada	2:52
6.	"Bikini"	Davidior; Frenchesca Mahusay; GG Ramirez; Lindgren	Davidior; Lindgren	2:09
7.	"Shagidi"	Angela Ken Rojas; Anna Achoso–Graham; Courtlin Edwards; JBach; Marqueze Parker; Tommy Brown	Greg Shilling; Leather Jacket; Brown	2:28
Total length:				20:55

== Listicles ==
Name of publisher, year listed, name of listicle, and placement
Publisher	Year	Listicle	Placement	Ref.
Billboard Philippines	2025	Favorite Albums of 2025	Placed	
Billboard Philippines	2025	25 Best Filipino Albums and EPs of 2025	Placed	
Manila Bulletin	2026	Favorite OPM albums of 2025	Placed	

== Personnel ==
Credits are adapted by Tidal.

- Bini – lead vocals (all tracks)
- 51000 Feet Music – music publisher (2, 6)
- ABS-CBN Film Productions, Inc. – music publisher (1, 3, 4, 5, 6, 7)
- Anna Achoso-Graham – vocal arranger (all tracks)
- Artist 101 Publishing Group – music publisher (7)
- Bee & Rose Music – music publisher (6)
- BMG Gold Songs – music publisher (7)
- CallMe Parker Music – music publisher (7)
- Champagne1543 – music publisher (2, 6)
- Champagne Therapy Publishing – music publisher (2)
- Chris "Moophs" Lopez – A&R Administration (all tracks), recording engineer (all tracks)
- Cutie Girl Music – music publisher (2)
- Dan "Uncle Deezy" Naim – mixing engineer (2, 6)
- Darren Cashwell – mixing engineer (4)
- Greg Shiling – vocal producer (2, 6, 7)
- iGrindEnt – music publisher (7)
- Jbachpublishing – music publisher (7)
- Jeremy G – mixing (4), recording engineer (4), second engineer (4), vocal producer (4)
- Jonathan Manalo – recording engineer (3), vocal producer (3)
- Kiana V Music – music publisher (1)
- Leon Zervos – mastering engineer (all tracks)
- Manila Music Entertainment – music publisher (5)
- Michael Pratt – mixing engineer (1, 5)
- Mmemusic – music publisher (5)
- Nordic Music Partners Helsinki – music publisher (2)
- Rich Travali – surround mixing engineer (all tracks)
- Rosemarie Tan – vocal producer (1, 5)
- Seven Summits Music – music publisher (1, 5)
- Shan Pooviriyakul – vocal producer (1)
- Songs for Lola – music publisher (1, 5)
- Songs of Kobalt Music Publishing – music publisher (7)
- Sony Music Publishing Limited (Hong Kong) – music publisher (1, 5)
- Sony / ATV Songs LLC – music publisher (6)
- Sony Music Publishing Philippines – music publisher (5)
- Sony Music Publishing Worldwide – music publisher (2)
- Swell Mood Publishing – music publisher (1)
- Universal Music Corp. – music publisher (2, 6, 7)
- Tiana Kocher – vocal producer (5)
- Tbhitsville – music publisher (7)
- Tinkermel Music Creations – music publisher (2, 6)
- Theo Martel – mixing engineer (3)
- These Are Pulse Songs – music publisher (5)
- Treyvonce Moore – mixing engineer (7)
- Two Elevens Entertainment, Inc. – music publisher (1)
- Warner Chappell Music – music publisher (2)

== See also ==
- Destino by Alamat
- The Dissection of Eve by G22
- List of 2025 albums

== Release history ==
Region	Date	Format	Label	Ref.
Various	November 20, 2025	digital download; streaming	Star Music	
Various	January 20, 2026	CD; LP	Star Music	
