= First Luv =

Single by Bini

from the album Flames
- Language: English; Tagalog
- Released: October 2, 2025
- Genre: Bubblegum pop; R&B
- Length: 2:56
- Label: Star
- Songwriters: Dwta; Kajo; Kiana Valenciano; Rosemarie Tan; Shan Pooviriyakul
- Producer: Kajo

Bini singles chronology
"Shagidi" (2025)	"First Luv" (2025)	"Paruparo" (2025)

Music video
- "First Luv" on YouTube

"First Luv" is a song by the Filipino girl group Bini from their third studio album Flames (2025). The track was released as the second single of the album on October 2, 2025, through Star Music. It was written by Dwta, Kajo, Kiana Valenciano, Rosemarie Tan, and Shan Pooviriyakul, and produced by Kajo. "First Luv" is a mid-tempo bubblegum pop and R&B track characterized by its bright, upbeat melody and romantic theme. The song features a cowbell, 808 bass, and a church organ in its instrumentals. It marks Bini's first Tagalog lead single following a series of all-English tracks.

The song received favorable reviews from music critics, particularly for the members' vocal performances. In the week of October 18, 2025, the song entered Billboard Philippines' Hot 100 chart. It was reportedly the only P-pop track on the chart for the week. "First Luv" appeared in several listicles, such as "Pulp Loves: Our Favorite P-pop Songs of 2025" by the Filipino magazine Pulp and "P-pop's Best in 2025" by the American magazine Positively Filipino. In January 2026, the song also received a nomination for P-pop Song of the Year at the VP Choice Awards.

The music video was directed by Jason Max. It features the Bini members as Cupid's trainees, shooting arrows toward different individuals and instilling different forms of love in them: self-love, romantic love, platonic love/friendship, and familial love. LGBTQ stars Esnyr and Klarisse De Guzman appear in the video, among other actors. The video's visuals draw inspiration from rococo art. It also garnered acclaim, especially for its visual appeal and sapphic romantic storyline between De Guzman and her real-life partner Trina Rey.

== Background and release ==
On June 5, 2025, the Filipino girl group Bini released "Shagidi", a special tour single. On September 16, 2025, Coachella officially announced Bini as a part of their 2026 lineup, marking them as the first Filipino act to perform at the festival. Following the release of "Shagidi", Bini announced that their next single, "First Luv", would be released in October. It was released by Star Music on October 2, through digital download and streaming formats. It was issued as the second single from their third studio album Flames.

The group teased the song with a series of concept photos featuring group and individual shots, where the members wore ruffled, corseted pink outfits. A short teaser clip depicted them as a part of a vintage painting in an art gallery. "First Luv" is Bini's first Tagalog single following a series of all-English tracks such as "Cherry on Top" (2024) and "Blink Twice" (2025). They also previewed the music video through an Instagram clip. It featured the members arranged on a staircase in a stylized, dreamlike setting. One of the teasers hinted at the lyrics "Araw-gabi naaalala..." (transl. From morning to night, I remember…)

== Composition and lyrics ==
"First Luv"
A 13-second sample of the songs's chorus, which blends bubblegum pop and R&B.

"First Luv" is a mid-tempo bubblegum pop and R&B track. It features a pattering cowbell and 808 bass in its instrumentals. A church organ can also be heard in the song's introduction. Gwen starts the track instead of Stacey, the member who typically sings first in Bini songs.

In the bridge sung by Maloi, Gwen, Stacey, and Jhoanna, the church organ is heard again, alongside soft harmonies and dramatic piano. Julienne Loreto of &Asian described the bridge's inclusion of Stacey, who does not possess an official vocalist position in Bini, as a mark of the group's versatility. A breakbeat can also be heard when Mikha and Colet sing later in the song. The song's melody is upbeat and "bubbly", fitting its subject matter.

Lyrically, the song is about the excitement of first love, with the lines such as, "First love, kinikilig 'pag magkasama." (transl. First love, I feel butterflies when we're together.) and "Araw-gabi naaalala" (transl. Day and night, I remember). The song contains lyrics in both English and Tagalog. It was written by Dwta, Kajo, Kiana Valenciano, Rosemarie Tan, and Shan Pooviriyakul and produced by Kajo.

== Reception ==
"First Luv" received favorable reviews from music critics. Billboard Philippines' Ralph Regis praised the track's warmth, catchiness, and "kilig-filled" energy. Andrea Dee of Pulp remarked that it showcases the Bini members' "charming" vocals. In Pulp's separate track-by-track review of the album Flames (2025), Reyza Ferranco wrote that "First Luv" is "as sweet and glowing as the feeling it captures".

Jade Diones, Eliza Orlic, and Minnie Dao of Envi Media wrote that the song showcases Bini's "blend of delicate and powerful vocals", adding that the sweet lyrics would make listeners swoon. They added that the bridge "creat[es] a feeling like you're ascending into the clouds". Bandwagon Asia's Hidzir Junaini called the song "nostalgic" and lauded its "emotional depth". Julienne Loreto of the American magazine Positively Filipino commended the song for achieving "vintage elegance" in its sound, even without interpolating pre-existing classical music, unlike comparable songs such as "Feel My Rhythm" by Red Velvet. They hailed "First Luv" as an example of musical experimentation done correctly. Gavin Martinez of the Philippine Daily Inquirer's US Bureau said that the song "perfectly" expresses the "fairy tale" experience of falling in love for the first time.

In the week of October 18, 2025, the song entered Billboard Philippines' Hot 100 chart, debuting at number 73. It was reportedly the only P-pop song on the chart for the week. "First Luv" appeared in several listicles: "10 OPM Songs for Reflection and New Beginnings" by Billboard Philippines; "Fans Pick Their Favorite Songs And Albums Of 2025" by Billboard Philippines; "Pulp Loves: Our Favorite P-pop Songs of 2025" by Pulp; "P-pop's Best in 2025" by Positively Filipino, and "The P-pop love playlist you can't miss this Valentine's Day" by the Philippine Daily Inquirer (US Bureau), and was nominated for P-pop Song of the Year at the VP Choice Awards in January 2026.

== Music video ==
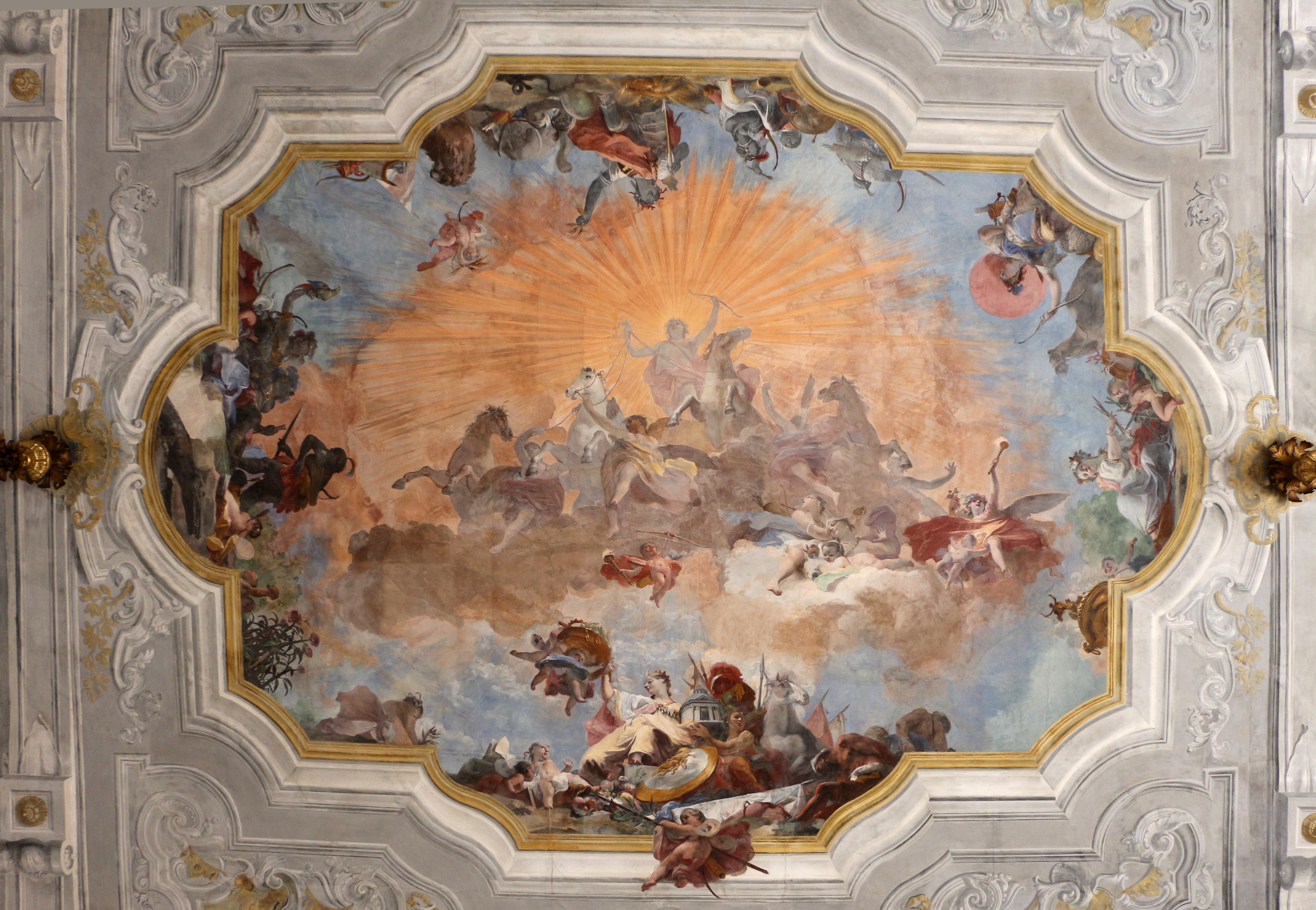
The "First Luv" music video draws inspiration from rococo art.

The music video was directed by Jason Max. It shows the Bini members shooting Cupid's arrows into various individuals. They shoot an arrow for self-love at Esnyr; romantic love at Klarisse de Guzman and her real-life partner Trina Rey; friendship or platonic love at Star Magic actors Marc Santiago, Andrez Del Rosario, Lance Lucido and Miguel Vergara; as well as familial love at a man who later reconciles with his wife and child. Aesthetically, the video evokes rococo art. The set was designed by Princess Anne Barretto, with cinematography by Renz Gonzales. The Bini members wear pink outfits with ruffles and corsets in the video; Pulp's Andrea Dee described their appearance in the clip as "princess-like". The video also features choreography by Reden Blanquera and Matthew Almodovar, adding to the "full sensory experience", according to Bandwagon Asia's Hidzir Junaini.

The video garnered acclaim for portraying different forms of love, particularly the LGBTQ themes. According to Kristine Kang of GMA Network, the video elevates the message of the song. Rappler's Alessandria Corral praised the video for its "kilig-worthy" queer romantic storyline between De Guzman and Rey. Likewise, &Asian's Julienne Loreto praised its clear depiction of sapphic romance, a rarity in mainstream "idol" music. Envi Media's Jade Diones, Eliza Orlic, and Minnie Dao observed that beyond its visual appeal, the video is also a reminder for audiences to love freely.

== Credits ==
Credits are adapted by Apple Music and Tidal.

- Bini – vocals
- ABS-CBN Film Productions, Inc. – music publisher
- Anna Achacoso-Graham – vocal arranger
- Chris "Moophs" Lopez – A&R administrator, recording engineer
- Dwta – songwriter
- Kajo – songwriter, producer
- Kiana V. – songwriter
- Kiana V. Music – music publisher
- Leon Zervos – mastering engineer
- Michael Pratt – mixing engineer
- Rich Travali – immersive mixing engineer
- Rosemarie Tan – songwriter, vocal producer
- Seven Summits Music – music publisher
- Shan Pooviriyakul – songwriter, vocal producer
- Songs for Lola – music publisher
- Sony Music Publishing (Hong Kong) Limited – music publisher
- Swell Mood Publishing – music publisher
- Two Elevens Entertainment, Inc. – music publisher

== Charts ==
Chart performance for "First Luv"
Chart (2025)	Peak position
Philippines Hot 100 (Billboard Philippines)	73

== Accolades ==
Award	Year	Category	Result	Ref.
VP Choice Awards	2026	P-Pop Song of the Year	Nominated	
