= Paruparo (song) =

Single by Bini

from the album Flames
- Language: Tagalog; English
- English title: Butterfly
- Released: November 6, 2025
- Genre: Bubblegum pop; soul; R&B; house; EDM
- Length: 3:32
- Label: Star
- Songwriters: Danna Balagtas; Jhoanna Robles; Jonathan Manalo; Mikha Lim; Stacey Sevilleja
- Producer: Jonathan Manalo

Bini singles chronology
"First Luv" (2025)	"Paruparo" (2025)	"Unang Kilig" (2026)

Music video
- "Paruparo" on YouTube

"Paruparo" (lit. 'Butterfly') is a song by the Filipino girl group Bini. Written by Danna Balagtas, Jhoanna Robles, Jonathan Manalo, Mikha Lim, Stacey Sevilleja, and produced by Manalo, it was released as a digital pre-single for their third album Flames on November 6, 2025, through Star Music. Musically, "Paruparo" has been described as a bubblegum pop, soul, and R&B track.

== Background and release ==
After the release of "Shagidi", Bini announced that their next single, "First Luv", would arrive in October 2025. The group previewed the song through concept photos showing the members in coordinated pink, ruffled, and corseted outfits. On September 16, Coachella announced that Bini will be included in the line up in Coachella 2026, making them the first Filipino act scheduled to perform at the festival, set for April 10 and 17, 2026. First Luv was officially released on October 2, 2025. making the group's return to Tagalog lyrics after several English-language releases, including "Blink Twice" and "Cherry on Top". By the week of October 18, 2025, the song debuted at number 73 on Billboard Philippines Hot 100 chart, noted as the only P-pop entry on the that that week.

Following the release of "First Luv", Bini announced the release of their pre-release single, "Paruparo". It was released on November 6, 2025, as part of their upcoming album Flames.

== Composition and lyrics ==
"Paruparo" is three minutes and thirty-one seconds and was written by Dana Balagtas, Jonathan Manalo, and co-members Jhoanna Robles, Mikha Lim, and Stacey Sevilleja. Musically, the song has been described as a mix of bubblegum pop, soul, and R&B, as well as a house and EDM track. Produced by Manalo, its lyrics explore growth, transformation, and self-empowerment. The song uses the metaphor of a butterfly learning to fly to represent life's journey, encouraging listeners to face their fears, pursue their dreams, and trust in their own process.

== Reception ==
Julienne Loreto of &Asian criticized the song's production, calling its EDM riffs "outdated" and comparing them unfavorably to the songs of The Chainsmokers from the 2010s.

== Music video ==
An official butterfly-themed music video was released on January 1, 2026, which did not include members of Bini in its cast. Instead, it featured three Bini fans, Miss Grand International 2025 titleholder Emma Tiglao and the drag artist trio Divine Divas, composed of Precious Paula Nicole, Brigiding, and Viñas DeLuxe.

== Credits and personnel ==
Credits are adapted by Apple Music.

- Bini – vocals
- Anna Achoso–Graham – vocal arranger
- Dana Balagtas – songwriter
- Jhoanna Robles – songwriter
- Jonathan Manalo – songwriter, producer, recording engineer
- Leon Zervos – mastering engineer
- Mikha Lim – songwriter
- Rich Travali – immersive mixing engineer
- Stacey Sevilleja – songwriter
