= Sweet Tooth (Bini song) =

Song by Bini

from the album Flames
- Released: November 20, 2025
- Genre: R&B; pop
- Length: 3:00
- Label: Star
- Songwriters: Lindgren; Jurek Reunamäki; Kyra Fields; Melanie Joy Fontana
- Producers: Lindgren; Jurek Reunamäki

Music video
- "Sweet Tooth" on YouTube

"Sweet Tooth" is a song recorded by Filipino girl group Bini. Star Music released it along its music video on November 20, 2025, as a track for the album Flames. The song was written by Lindgren, Jurek Reunamäki, Kyra Fields, and Melanie Joy Fontana, and produced by Lindgren and Jurek Reunamäki. The R&B and pop track is described as a soft and addictive piece that transforms desire into a metaphor for sugar. The music video was directed by Kerbs Balagtas and produced by YouMeUsMNL.

== Background and release ==
Bini released the single "First Luv" on October 2, 2025. The song marked the group's first Tagalog release after a series of English singles, including "Blink Twice" and "Cherry on Top". During the week of October 18, 2025, "First Luv" entered the Billboard Philippines Hot 100 at number 73, noted as the only pinoy pop entry on the chart at the time.

The album Flames was released on November 20, 2025, along with the release of the music video of "Sweet Tooth" which was directed by Kerbs Balagtas and produced by YouMeUsMNL and was shot in New Clark City.

== Composition ==
"Sweet Tooth" is three minutes long, and was written by Lindgren, Jurek Reunamäki, Kyra Fields, and Melanie Joy Fontana. Produced by Lindgren and Jurek Reunamäki, the R&B and pop track is describes as a soft and addictive piece that transforms desire into a metaphor for sugar.

== Reception ==
"Sweet Tooth" received favorable reviews from critics. The staff of Filipino music magazine Pulp collectively praised the song's maturity, adding that it shows how Bini is "ready to delve more into the global mainstream while keeping their Pinoy roots". Anjana Pawa of the American media platform JoySauce wrote that the track is "addictive".

== Listicles ==
Name of publisher, year listed, name of listicle, and placement
Publisher	Year	Listicle	Placement	Ref.
Pulp	2025	Pulp Loves: Our Favorite P-pop Songs of 2025	Placed	
JoySauce	2025	JoySauce Radio: Our favorite Asian diasporic songs from 2025	Placed	

== Accolades ==
Award	Year	Category	Result	Ref.
BreakTudo Awards	2026	International Music Video	Pending	

== Credits and personnel ==
Credits are adapted from Tidal.

- Bini – vocals
- 51000 Feet Music – music publisher
- Anna Achacoso-Graham – vocal arranger
- Champagne1543 – music publisher
- Chris "Moophs" Lopez – A&R administrator, recording engineer
- Cutie Girl Music – music publisher
- Dan "Uncle Deezy" Naim – mixing engineer
- Greg Shilling – vocal producer
- Jurek Reunamäki – composer, producer
- Kyra Fields – composer
- Leon Zervos – mastering engineer
- Lindgren – composer, producer
- Melanie Fontana – composer
- Nordic Music Partners Helsinki – music publisher
- Rich Travali – surround mixing engineer
- Sony Music Publishing Worldwide – music publisher
- Tinkermel Music Creations – music publisher
- Universal Music Corporation – music publisher
- Warner Chappell Music – music publisher
