= Positively Filipino =

US magazine for the Filipino diaspora

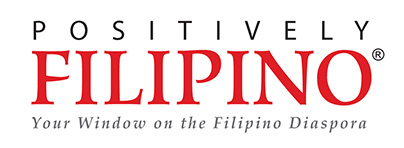
- Publisher: Mona Lisa Yuchengco
- Frequency: Monthly, but weekly updates are sent to emails registered on the publication website
- Total circulation: Is digital; has no fixed circulation
- First issue: November 2012
- Company: Positively Filipino LLC
- Country: United States
- Based in: San Francisco, California
- Language: English
- Website: www.positivelyfilipino.com/magazine/

Positively Filipino is an American magazine that focuses on the Filipino diaspora. The magazine was established when Mona Lisa Yuchengco, the founder of Filipinas magazine, decided to try another publishing venture after selling Filipinas. She joined with a number of former writers and editors from Filipinas, which she sold in 2005. This venture was designed to be an online venture, since print magazines had been declining in popularity for years.

The name of the magazine was derived from a case of discrimination in Stockton, California, in the 1930s. This incident is described in an editorial in the magazine, "In America in the 1930s, Filipino immigrants often faced rejection and racism – a hotel in Stockton, California even posted a warning: 'Positively No Filipinos Allowed.'" The editorial continued, saying, "Kababayans (compatriots) are positively welcome here, positively allowed to celebrate our heritage, and positively encouraged to explore our experiences."

Positively Filipino has a number of features. It has foremost "The Magazine" section, which is composed of articles on various subjects. The "In Brief" section provides brief pieces of news of interest to the readers. The "+Btw" section is subtitled "Opinions, Context, Ideas & Letters." This section provides information and opinion about the main articles and readers can submit letters here. The "Collections" and "Series" sections have a large variety of informational topics each month. The "Community News" section provides information about various festivals, meetings and the like from Filipino and Asian organizations through the United States. "The Screening Room" provides links to videos of interest to Filipinos.

In October 2014, six of its writers were awarded Plaridel Awards for Excellence in Filipino American Journalism from the Philippine American Press Club US. This was the largest number of Plaridel Awards handed out that year.
