= Blush (Bini song) =

Song by Bini

from the EP Signals
- Language: English; Cebuano; Tagalog
- Released: April 9, 2026
- Genre: Lounge
- Label: Star
- Songwriters: Anna Ratchford; Frenchesca Mahusay; Gello Marquez; Greg Shilling; Shintaro Yasuda
- Producers: Lindgren; Shintaro Yasuda

Music video
- "Blush" on YouTube

"Blush" is a song by the Filipino girl group Bini from their third extended play (EP) Signals (2026). It was written by Anna Ratchford, Gello Marquez, Greg Shilling, Shintato Yasuda and produced by Lindgren and Yasuda. The song has been described as lounge track that about the excitement and anticipation of a summer crush.

== Composition ==
"Blush" is a lounge track with an anthem for a summer crush, capturing the sensation of butterflies through its sound and conveying heart racing excitement experienced when someone special enters the room. Written by Anna Ratchford, Gello Marquez, Greg Shilling, Shintato Yasuda and produced by Lindgren and Yasuda. It also featured tropical drums and a melismatic hook.

== Charts ==
Chart performance for "Blush"
| Chart (2026) | Peak position |
|---|---|
| Philippines Hot 100 (Billboard Philippines) | 85 |

== Accolades ==
| Award | Year | Category | Result | Ref. |
|---|---|---|---|---|
| Filipino Music Awards | 2026 | People's Choice Awards: Song | Nominated | |
| P-pop Music Awards | 2026 | Song of the Year | Nominated | |
| P-pop Music Awards | 2026 | Production Design in a Music Video | Nominated | |
| RAWR Awards | 2026 | Song of the Year | Won | |
