= Stacey (singer) =

Filipino singer and dancer (born 2003)

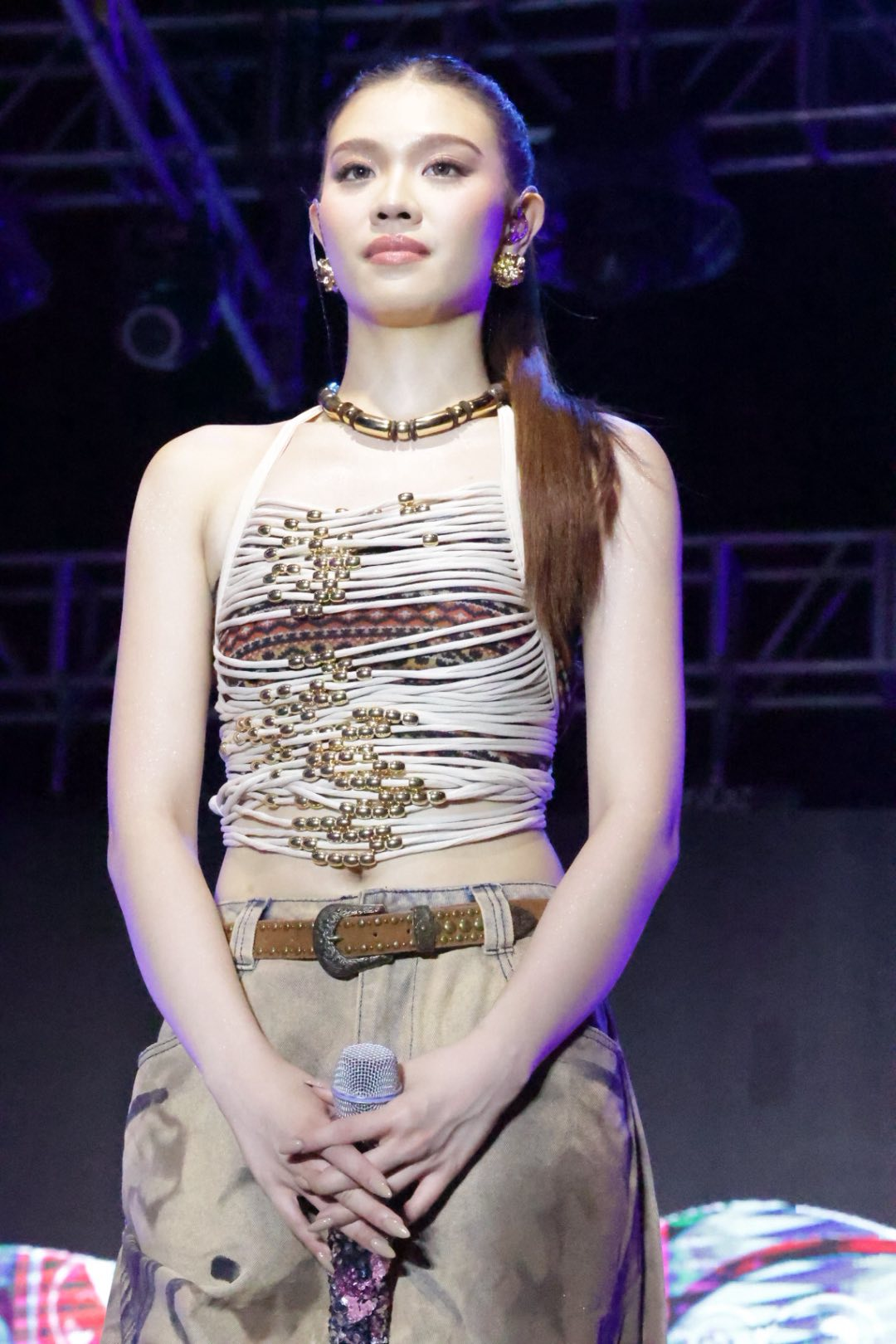
- Stacey in September 2025
- Born: Lindtsey Stacey Aubrey Sevilleja; July 13, 2003 (age 23); Bagabag, Nueva Vizcaya, Philippines
- Occupations: Singer; rapper; dancer
- Years active: 2020–present
- Musical career
- Genres: P-pop; bubblegum pop; teen pop; EDM
- Instruments: Vocals
- Label: Star
- Member of: Bini

Lindtsey Stacey Aubrey Sevilleja (born July 13, 2003), known mononymously as Stacey, is a Filipino singer, rapper, and dancer under Star Music. She is one of the main rappers of the Filipino girl group Bini.

== Early life and education ==
Lindtsey Stacey Aubrey Sevilleja was born on July 13, 2003 in Nueva Vizcaya, Philippines, to Ivy, a single mother. She grew up in Ifugao and Bagabag, Nueva Vizcaya and was a singer in her family's church. During her early years in school, she was a majorette for Lamut Central School in Ifugao where she attended her primary education until her family moved to Nueva Vizcaya where she continued her secondary education. There, she participated in numerous beauty pageants, supported by Ivy, a fashion designer who also created many of Stacey's outfits. In addition to beauty pageants, Stacey pursued modeling. She also developed talents in singing and dancing, participating in auditions like Star Hunt. During this time, she was selected to represent the Philippines in an international teen beauty pageant but chose to join the boot camp for Star Hunt Academy instead. Stacey graduated from high school at the Japan-Philippines Institute of Technology in 2026.

== Career ==
Stacey was selected as a trainee for Star Hunt Academy (SHA) in early 2019. On October 10, 2020, Stacey was one of the last eight trainees to graduate and was officially announced as a member of an idol group.

In November 2020, Stacey officially became a member of the Filipino girl group Bini. which officially debuted on June 11, 2021.

Stacey is capable of producing notes in the whistle register. Her whistle notes can be heard in Bini's official rendition of "Kabataang Pinoy" with SB19, among other songs.

In June 2025, the Filipino-Australian singer Ylona Garcia praised a cover of her song "Win the Fight" that Stacey performed along with Colet when the latter two were still Bini trainees. Stacey and Colet contributed additional lyrics to their cover. On social media, Garcia expressed an interest to record a version with the two.

== Discography ==
=== Songwriting credits ===
Credits are adapted from Apple Music.

List of singles, showing year released and associated albums
Title	Year	Artist	Album	Credits
"Paruparo"	2025	Bini	Flames	Writer

== Filmography ==
In January 2024, Stacey appeared along with Bini members Aiah and Mikha as guest judges on the second season of Drag Den, a drag reality show hosted by Manila Luzon. In July 2024, Stacey was cast alongside Joonee Gamboa in the music video of the song "Sining" (Art) by Dionela and Jay R.

In April 2025, Stacey was a houseguest of Pinoy Big Brother: Celebrity Collab Edition together with Jhoanna.

== Awards and nominations ==
Award	Year	Category	Nominee(s)	Result	Ref.
10th P-pop Awards	2025	P-pop Favorite Rapper of the Year	Stacey	Nominated	
