= Mikha Lim =

Filipino singer-dancer and actress (born 2003)

Mikha
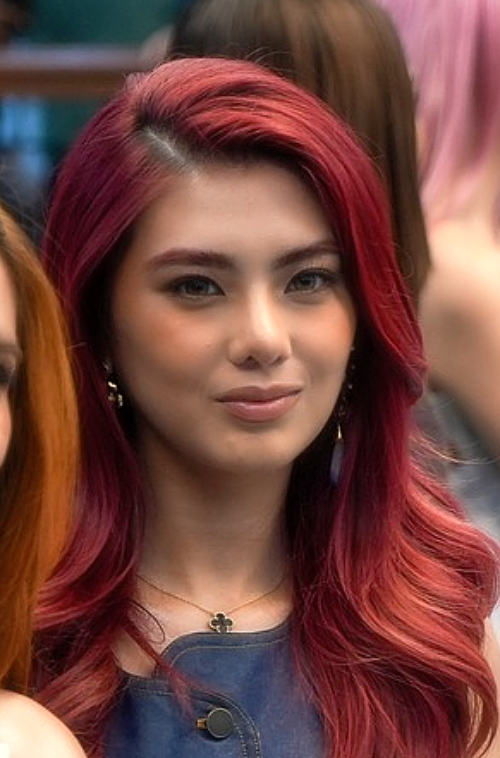
- Mikha at the Senate of the Philippines in May 2026
- Born: Mikhaela Janna Jimenea Lim; November 8, 2003 (age 23); Cebu City, Philippines
- Occupations: Singer; rapper; actress; dancer
- Years active: 2020–present
- Musical career
- Genres: P-pop; bubblegum pop; teen pop; EDM
- Instruments: Vocals
- Label: Star
- Member of: Bini

Mikhaela Janna Jimenea Lim (born November 8, 2003), also known mononymously as Mikha, is a Filipino singer, rapper, actress and dancer under Star Music. She is one of the main rappers of the Filipino girl group Bini.

In 2022, Lim made her acting debut as Elle Luna in the second season of He's Into Her, a teen romantic comedy series. She also appeared as a guest judge on the second season of the drag reality competition series Drag Den. In 2023 to 2025, she competed in the Star Magic All-Star Games. In 2024, Mikha was the tenth most searched female personality in the Philippines on Google.

== Early life and education ==
Mikhaela Janna Jimenea Lim was born on November 8, 2003, in Cebu, Philippines, to Myrla from Iloilo and John Lim, a Chinese Filipino from Bicol. She has two older siblings. Her family initially lived in Cebu City before moving to Santa Rosa, Laguna, when she was six years old, where she learned to speak Tagalog. They later relocated to Silang, Cavite, where they resided for eight years before moving to San Juan, Metro Manila.

Lim began singing in her childhood, inspired by her father. During high school, she was a cheerleader and a member of her school's cheerleading squad, which helped her learn how to dance and develop flexibility. She also played volleyball as a setter on her high school team.

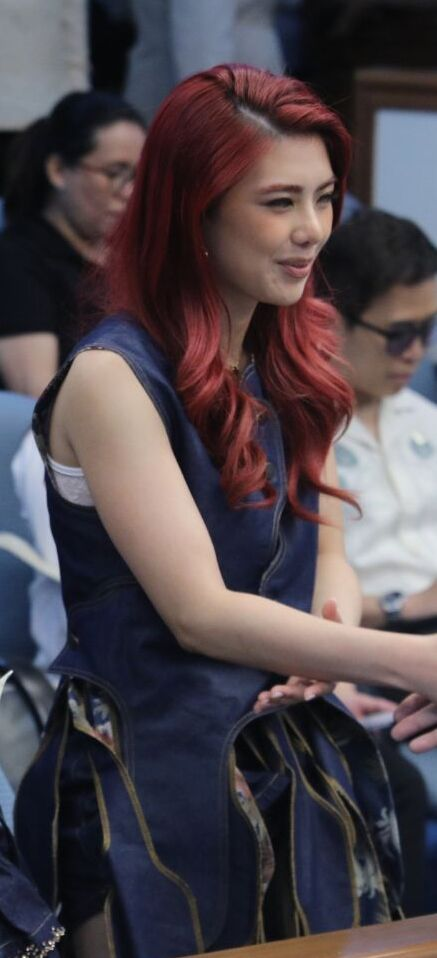
Lim at the Senate of the Philippines in May 2026

== Career ==
=== 2018–2020: Star Hunt Academy audition ===
In 2018, Lim auditioned for Star Hunt Academy (SHA) in Laguna and was selected as a trainee in early 2019. On October 10, 2020, Lim was one of the last eight trainees to graduate and was officially announced as a member of an idol group.

In November 2020, Lim officially became a member of the Filipino girl group Bini, which officially debuted on June 11, 2021.

=== 2021–present: Star Magic All-Star Games, television ventures ===
Lim replaced Melizza Jimenez as Elle Luna in the second season of He's Into Her, which began production in February 2022. The series' head writer Vanessa Valdez described her as a "rare find" and said that her audition was immediately impressive. The 16-episode season aired from April 22 to August 3. Lim, along with the other cast members of He's Into Her, held a series finale concert called HIH: All Access at the Araneta Coliseum on August 27.

Lim participated in the Star Magic All-Star Games volleyball competitions in 2023 to 2025, held at the Araneta Coliseum. The sports event for Star Magic talents is held annually at the Araneta Coliseum and is digitally broadcast via video on demand (VOD). In 2023, she played as a setter for the Lady Setters team, which she finished as the 1st runner-up and was recognized as part of the Mythical Six selection, receiving the Best Setter award. She received the award again in 2024 and mentioned Jia De Guzman's talent as a setter as her motivation for playing volleyball. In 2025, she played as a captain for the Lady Setters, which her team received the 1st runner-up trophy, while she received the Mythical Six honor.

In 2024, Lim was listed by Google as its tenth most searched female personality in the Philippines for the year.

In 2026, Lim and fellow Bini member Maloi were among the lead performers at the opening ceremony of UAAP Season 89 at the SM Mall of Asia Arena.

== Other ventures ==
=== Philanthropy and advocacy ===
In September 2025, Lim collaborated with Mental Health Youth Hub PH to provide a mental health seminar. The organization is dedicated to combating the stigma against mental health for the youth, as well as suicide prevention.

In December, she and Naga, Camarines Sur mayor Leni Robredo conducted a Christmas outreach program, distributing food and toys to the children in one of the city's communities.

In August 2026, she spoke out against the proposed construction of a Pax Silica facility in Capas, Tarlac, citing possible environmental damage and similar issues in the United States.

=== Business ===
In September 2026, Lim launched an activewear brand called Mili. According to Vogue Philippines, the brand's name contains two definitions: the first abbreviates her first name and surname; the second is an acronym meaning "Move, Inspire, Lifestyle, and Intend". She also revealed plans to open a Pilates studio.

== Personal life ==
Known as a volleyball fan, Lim is a supporter of the Akari Chargers. In November 2026, Lim's driving license was suspended for 90 days by the Land Transportation Office after she was caught using her phone while driving during a livestream. She subsequently issued an apology.

== Discography ==
=== Songwriting credits ===
Credits are adapted from Apple Music, unless otherwise specified.

List of singles, showing year released and associated albums
Title	Year	Artist	Album	Credits
"Golden Arrow"	2021	Bini	Born to Win	Writer
"Karera"	2023	Bini	Talaarawan	Writer
"Cherry on Top (BiniMo Remix)"	2025	Bini and Agnez Mo	Biniverse	Writer
"Paruparo"	2025	Bini	Flames	Writer

== Filmography ==
=== Television ===
Year	Title	Role	Notes	Ref.
2022	He's Into Her	Elle Luna	Supporting role Replaced Melizza Jimenez in the second season	
2024	Drag Den	Herself	Guest judge (season 2, episode 1)	

=== Online/Digital ===
Year	Title	Role	Notes	Ref.
2024	Baddie-Bot	Herself	Denise Julia's vlog series	

=== Music videos ===
Year	Title	Artist	Ref.
2026	"Pagdating ng Panahon"	Iñigo Pascual	

== Accolades ==
Award	Year	Category	Nominee(s)	Result	Ref.
VP Choice Awards	2025	Female TikTok Face of the Year	Mikha Lim	Nominated	
10th P-pop Awards	2025	P-pop Favorite Rapper of the Year	Mikha	Nominated	
