= List of Bini live performances =

Bini live performances
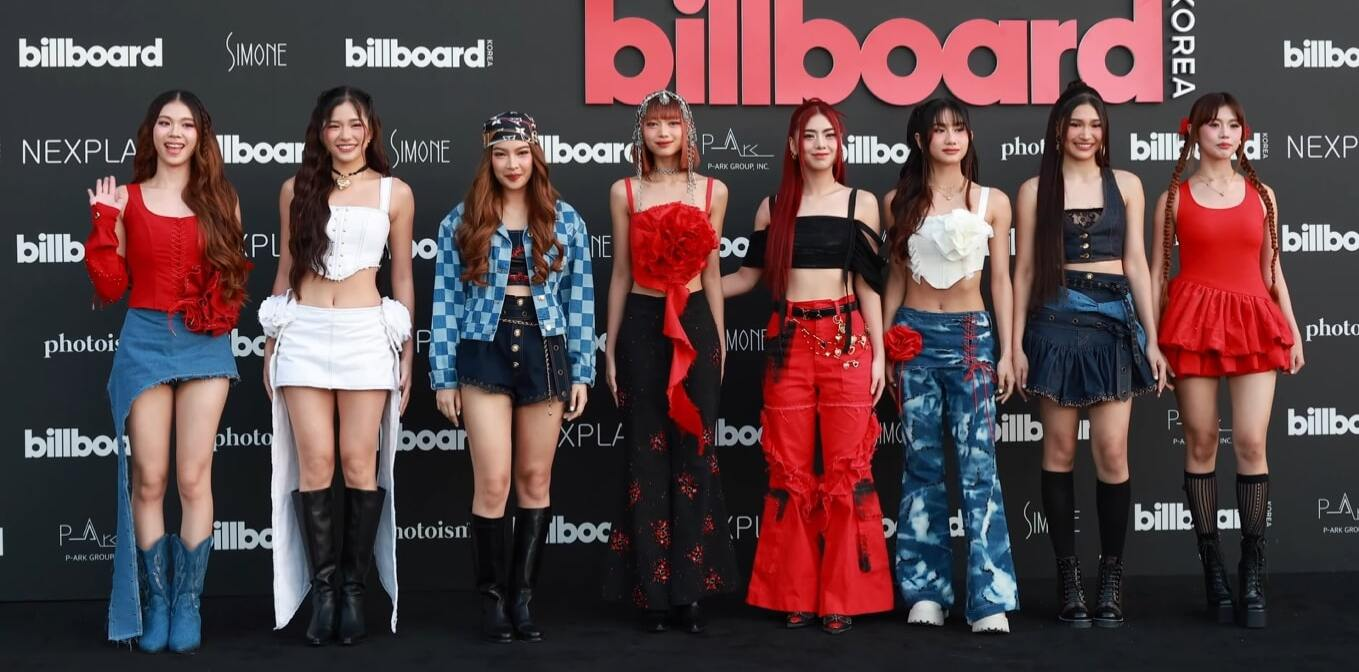
- Bini at Billboard Korea's Billboard K Power 100 event in 2024
- Concert tours: 2
- Concerts: 3
- Joint concerts and tours: 24
- Concert appearances: 18
- Music festivals: 20
- Fan meetings: 16
- Other events: 8

The Filipino girl group Bini has headlined several concerts and performed at joint events, music festivals, and on other occasions. The group was formed through the Star Hunt Academy program in 2018, where its members were selected from a pool of auditionees who underwent intensive training from 2019 to 2020. Their career began with the release of their pre-debut single, "Da Coconut Nut", in 2018, an electropop remake of the same song by Ryan Cayabyab. The group made its debut in June 2021 through the two-part online concert, Bini: The Launch.

Bini staged their first solo concert, the Biniverse: The First Solo Concert, from June 28 to 30, 2024, at New Frontier Theater in Quezon City to celebrate their third anniversary. It was then extended to have regional and international legs following demand from fans clamoring to participate, with the regional leg held in Baguio on July 6, in Cebu City on July 14, and in General Santos on July 20. The international leg was held in Vancouver on August 9 and in Edmonton on August 10, with the remaining performances of the leg scheduled in Winnipeg on August 16, and in Toronto on August 17. The group held The Grand Biniverse concert on November 16, 18 and 19 at the Araneta Coliseum in Quezon City.

Bini also participated in and held several mall shows during their early years. On July 22, 2022, they participated in Be You: The World Will Adjust, a benefit concert. It was headlined by the South Korean girl group Red Velvet and also participated in by Filipino acts BGYO and Lady Pipay. On July 15, 2023, the group held Bini Fest at Ayala Malls Solenad in Nuvali, Santa Rosa, Laguna, to celebrate their second anniversary. They also showcased their promotional single "Super Crush" at the event as part of their endorsement of the snack brand, Super Crunch. Apart from their solo concerts and mall shows, Bini has also participated in joint concerts and music festivals. On July 12, 2024, they performed at the Puregold: Nasa Atin ang Panalo thanksgiving concert along with Flow G, SB19, and SunKissed Lola, held at the Araneta Coliseum. The group also performed at the pre-show of the KCON music festival at the Crypto.com Arena in Los Angeles on July 27, where they performed their single "Cherry on Top". This made Bini the first Filipino pop act to perform at the festival.

In 2025, Bini conducted their second concert tour titled Biniverse World Tour 2025, which began on February 15, 2025, at the Philippine Arena in Bulacan. It spanned multiple cities, including Dubai, London, and key cities in the United States and Canada, and culminated in a homecoming event at the SM Mall of Asia Arena in Pasay on June 29, 2025.

In February 2026, Bini announced their third concert tour titled Signals World Tour, which began on June 18, 2026 at the SM Small of Asia Arena in Pasay and will continue until November 2026. In April 2026, Bini became the first Filipino act to perform in Coachella. In July 2026, Bini made a surprise performance at San Diego Comic-Con as part of DreamWorks Animation's Forgotten Island panel. Bini also performed at the Summer Sonic Festival in Japan.

== Concerts ==
=== Headlining concert tours ===
List of headlining concert tours, showing dates, associated albums, locations, and number of shows
Title	Date	Associated album	Countries	Shows	Ref.
Biniverse	June 28, 2024 – November 19, 2024	Talaarawan	Philippines; Canada	12	
Biniverse World Tour 2025	February 15, 2025 – June 21, 2025	Biniverse	Philippines; United Arab Emirates; United Kingdom; United States; Canada	15	
Signals World Tour 2026	June 20, 2026 – November 15, 2026	Signals	Philippines; United States; Canada; Netherlands; Italy; France; United Kingdom; Switzerland; Germany; Australia; New Zealand; Singapore; Taiwan	25	

=== Headlining concerts ===
List of headlining concerts, showing dates, locations, and venues
Title	Date(s)	City	Country	Venue	Ref.
Bini: The Launch – The Runway	June 4, 2021	—N/a	Philippines	Virtual	
Bini: The Launch – The Showcase	June 11, 2021	—N/a	Philippines	Virtual	
Binified: Year-End Party	November 29, 2025	Bocaue	Philippines	Philippine Arena	

=== Joint concerts and tours ===
/List of joint concerts and tours, showing dates, locations, and venues
Title	Date(s)	City	Country	Venue	Ref.
All for One (Canadian Multiculturalism Day): Celebrating Unity in Diversity with AC Bonifacio, BGYO, Darren Espanto, Glisha, Kayla Rivera, rIVerse, and Southeast Cartel	June 26, 2021	—N/a	Canada	Virtual	
One Dream: The Bini and BGYO Concert with Special performances from AC Bonifacio, KZ Tandingan and Kritiko	November 6–7, 2021	—N/a	Philippines	Virtual	
1MX Dubai 2021 (Filipino Music Festival) with Ez Mil, Bamboo, Moira Dela Torre, BGYO and Gigi de Lana	December 3, 2021	Dubai	United Arab Emirates	Dubai World Trade Centre	
One Dream: The Bini and BGYO Concert Version 2022	February 12–13, 2022	—N/a	Philippines	Aired via live streaming through KTX	
2022 PPOPCON: The Ultimate P-pop Fan Gathering (Convention and Concert)	April 9–10, 2022	Quezon City	Philippines	Convention: New Frontier Theater, Concert: Araneta Coliseum and simulcast via live streaming through KTX	
A Light of Hope Virtual Concert: for the Youth, their Moms and Educators with BGYO, John Arcilla, Ebe Dancel, Kiana Valenciano, Ice Seguerra and Ballet Philippines	May 25, 2022	—N/a	Philippines	Aired via live streaming through Zoom, Facebook and YouTube	
Be You: The World will Adjust Benefit Concert with Red Velvet, BGYO and Lady Pipay	July 22, 2022	Pasay	Philippines	Mall of Asia Arena	
HIH All Access: The He's Into Her Grand Finale Concert (Note: "with He's Into Her All Casts and other guests performers BGYO, Sab, Trisha Denise, Jon Guelas, Zion Aguirre and The Nameless Kids")	August 27, 2022	Quezon City	Philippines	Araneta Coliseum	
Kumu is 4 U: A Birthday Concert (Note: "Alongside other P-pop groups and Kumu Streamers.")	September 2, 2022	Taguig	Philippines	Samsung Hall – SM Aura Premier	
1MX Sydney 2023	October 8, 2023	Sydney	Australia	Hordern Pavilion	
Mr. Music: The Hits of Jonathan Manalo	October 15, 2022	Pasay	Philippines	Newport Performing Arts Theater	
UST Annual Paskuhan Concert	December 21, 2023	Manila	Philippines	University of Santo Tomas	
POP Rising: UP Fair 2024	February 13, 2024	Quezon City	Philippines	Sunken Garden, University of the Philippines Diliman	
Solstice: A Fundraising Concert	May 4, 2024	Quezon City	Philippines	Ateneo de Manila Junior High School	
Musikalayaan: 126th Philippine Independence Day Concert	June 12, 2024	Manila	Philippines	Quirino Grandstand	
Puregold: Nasa Atin ang Panalo – Thanksgiving Concert	July 12, 2024	Quezon City	Philippines	Araneta Coliseum	
ASAP Natin 'To California	August 3, 2024	Ontario, California	United States	Toyota Arena	
OgieOke 2 Reimagined	November 30, 2024	Pasay	Philippines	Newport Performing Arts Theater	
OPM Con 2025	July 5, 2025	Bocaue/Santa Maria	Philippines	Philippine Arena	
ASAP England	August 30, 2025	Solihull (Note: Promoted as Birmingham)	United Kingdom	bp pulse LIVE	
DOMIN8	October 19, 2025	Pasay	Philippines	SM Mall of Asia Arena	
Cloudstaff Roar 2025	December 6, 2025	Bocaue	Philippines	Philippine Arena	
UST Annual Paskuhan Concert	December 19, 2025	Manila	Philippines	University of Santo Tomas	
Unfiltered: Real. Raw. Radiant	October 17, 2026	Tacloban	Philippines	Leyte Sports Complex	

=== Guest appearances ===
List of special performances and appearances, showing dates, locations, and venues
Title	Date(s)	City	Country	Venue	Ref.
"#TikTokTogetherPH": A Virtual Fundraising Concert	November 28, 2020	—N/a	Philippines	Virtual	
KTnX ang Babait Ninyo: The KTX Fundraising Christmas Special — P-Pop Rise (2020)	November 6–7, 2021	—N/a	Philippines	Virtual	
Positive Vibes for the Positive+: Benefit Concert for NICKL Entertainment	March 28, 2021	—N/a	Philippines	Virtual	
Uplive Worldstage Grand Finals	February 27, 2022	—N/a	Philippines	Virtual	
Global Peace Festival	December 1–3, 2022	Mabalacat, Pampanga	Philippines	Clark Global City Open Grounds	
Buhayani Festival 2023	June 19, 2023	Calamba, Laguna	Philippines	City Plaza	
Thomasian Welcome Party	August 7, 2023	Manila	Philippines	Quadricentennial Pavilion, University of Santo Tomas	
Modess: Sun and Fun Fair 2024	April 20, 2024	Antipolo, Rizal	Philippines	Robinsons Antipolo	
KCC Artist Show	April 26, 2024	Zamboanga City	Philippines	KCC Mall De Zamboanga	
Bangusan Street Party	April 30, 2024	Dagupan	Philippines	De Venecia Highway	
Ryan Cayabyab's 'Gen C' Birthday Musical Tribute	May 11–12, 2024	Makati	Philippines	Samsung Performing Arts Theater	
Star Magic Hot Summer 2024	May 15, 2024	San Juan, Batangas	Philippines	La Luz Beach Resort and Spa	
Puregold Sari-Sari Store Convention 2024 (Unilever Philippines announced Bini as their newest endorsers for Vitakeratin)	May 17, 2024	Pasay	Philippines	World Trade Center Metro Manila	
Mapúa University SCEGE Night 2024	May 19, 2024	Pasay	Philippines	Le Pavilion	
DLSU – Dasmariñas Solfest 2024	May 28, 2024	Dasmariñas, Cavite	Philippines	DLSU-D Grandstand	
Alpas Sunset Session	May 30, 2024	San Juan, La Union	Philippines	Alpas La Union	
Billboard Philippines: Mainstage	October 15, 2024	Pasay	Philippines	SM Mall of Asia Arena	
"Radiating on Top" New Year Countdown	December 31, 2024	Makati	Philippines	Ayala Avenue	
Get, Get, Aw!: The SexBomb Concert: rAWnd 3	February 6, 2026	Pasay	Philippines	SM Mall of Asia Arena	
A Matter of Time Tour	May 25, 2026	Pasay	Philippines	SM Mall of Asia Arena	
Kaogma Festival	May 30, 2026	Pili, Camarines Sur	Philippines	Camarines Sur Uptown	

== Music festivals ==
List of music festival performances, showing dates, locations, and venues
Title	Date(s)	City	Country	Venue	Ref.
Tugatog: The Filipino Music Festival 2022	July 15, 2022	Pasay	Philippines	Mall of Asia Arena and simulcast via live streaming	
Zark's Fest 2023	May 13, 2023	Makati	Philippines	Circuit Makati Grounds	
Spectacle! 2023	June 11, 2023	Singapore	Singapore	Esplanade Recital Studio, Esplanade, Theaters on the Bay	
Malaya Music Fest 2023	August 19, 2023	Parañaque	Philippines	Cove Manila	
G Music Fest 2023	September 16, 2023	Makati	Philippines	Circuit Makati Grounds	
Bacolod Masskara Festival 2023	October 20–22, 2023	Bacolod	Philippines	Lacson Street	
Music Matters Live 2024 Singapore	May 9, 2024	Singapore		Clarke Quay	
Ang Pinaka: The SK San Antonio Grand Music Festival 2024	June 15, 2024	Makati	Philippines	Barangay San Antonio	
Samsung Galaxy AI Festival	July 13, 2024	Taguig	Philippines	5th Avenue, Bonifacio Global City	
KCON LA 2024: M Countdown Preshow	July 27, 2024	Los Angeles	United States	Crypto.com Arena	
G Fest	September 22, 2024	Pasay	Philippines	SMX Convention Center Manila	
ASIYA Asian Music Festival & Conference	October 12–13, 2024	Pasay	Philippines	World Trade Center Metro Manila	
His7ory 7th Anniversary	October 20, 2024	Pasay	Philippines	SM Mall of Asia Arena	
Aurora Music Festival	May 3–4, 2025	Angeles City/Mabalacat	Philippines	Clark Global City	
Alagang Suki Fest 2025	July 31, 2025	Quezon City	Philippines	Araneta Coliseum	
Coke Studio Live 2025	September 5, 2025	Quezon City	Philippines	Araneta Coliseum	
Aurora Music Festival Davao	October 25, 2025	Davao City	Philippines	Crocodile Farm Concert Grounds	
Wonderful Moments Music Festival	February 8, 2026	Parañaque	Philippines	SMDC Festival Grounds	
Coachella 2026	April 10 & 17, 2026	Indio, California	United States	Mojave Stage, Empire Polo Club	
Summer Sonic 2026	August 14, 2026	Osaka	Japan	Expo Commemoration Park	
Summer Sonic 2026	August 16, 2026	Tokyo	Japan	Zozo Marine Stadium and Makuhari Messe	
Coke Studio Live 2026	November 7, 2026	Pasay	Philippines	SM Mall of Asia Arena	

== Fan meetings ==
List of fan meeting performances, showing dates, locations, and venues
Title	Date	City	Country	Venue	Ref.
Bini Fest: 2nd Anniversary	July 15, 2023	Santa Rosa, Laguna	Philippines	Ayala Malls Solenad, Nuvali	
Happy Bini Day: 3rd Anniversary	June 11, 2024	Makati	Philippines	One Ayala	
ASAP Natin 'To California: Bini Fan Meet	July 31, 2024	Ontario, California	United States	—N/a	
JolliBini FanMeet	September 15, 2024	Pasay	Philippines	World Trade Center Metro Manila	
Intimate Moments: Modess x Bini Fan Meet	November 22, 2024	Quezon City	Philippines	Vice Comedy Club	
Miniverse	April 27, 2025	Makati	Philippines	One Ayala Space	
Here With You	June 29, 2025	Pasay	Philippines	SM Mall of Asia Arena	
Haba-Habango Day With BINI	August 15, 2025	Taguig	Philippines	SMX Convention Center, SM Aura	
GDay BINI Fan Meet	September 13, 2025	Makati	Philippines	Samsung Performing Arts Theater	
Akari x Bini Meet and Greet	September 16, 2025	Taguig	Philippines	The Enderun Tent	
Biniverse and Miniverse Fan Meet	September 28, 2025	Cagayan De Oro	Philippines	Limketkai Atrium	
Biniverse and Miniverse Fan Meet	October 12, 2025	Iloilo City	Philippines	Grand Xing Imperial Hotel	
Penshoppe: Cozy Days Ahead Mall Tour	October 24, 2025	Davao City	Philippines	SM City Davao	
Love the Tiyan Dual Action Meet & Greet	February 7, 2026	Quezon City	Philippines	Skydome, SM North EDSA	
Valentines' Kiligan Fest	February 14, 2026	Manila	Philippines	Robinsons Manila	
Signal Detected: Blooms Day with Bini	March 21, 2026	Taguig	Philippines	Market! Market!	

== Other events ==
List of performances in other events, showing dates, locations, and venues
Title	Date	City	Country	Venue	Ref.
Happy Hallyu Day 4	August 22 and 29, 2020	Virtual	Philippines	Virtual	
Happy Hallyu Day 5	August 28–29, 2021	Virtual	Philippines	Virtual	
I Feel Good Album Showcase	October 28, 2022	Quezon City	Philippines	SM North Edsa Sky Dome	
Talaarawan Mall Show	April 14, 2024	Taguig	Philippines	Market! Market!	
Billboard Korea Billboard K Power 100	August 27, 2024	Seoul	South Korea	Hotel Shilla	
Ibalong Festival	September 6, 2025	Legazpi, Albay	Philippines	Legazpi Airport	
Grammy Museum’s Global Spin Live : Bini	April 21, 2026	Los Angeles, California	United States	Grammy Museum at L.A. Live	
San Diego Comic-Con 2026 (Forgotten Island panel)	July 24, 2026	San Diego, California	United States	San Diego Convention Center	
