= Signals World Tour 2026 =

2026 Concert tour by Bini

- World tour by Bini
- Promotional poster
- Location: Asia; Oceania; Europe; North America
- Associated album: Signals
- Start date: June 20, 2026
- End date: November 15, 2026
- No. of shows: 19
- Supporting acts: Ashley Mehta; JMKO; Rafi; Acoya
- Website: biniwt2026.abs-cbn.com
Bini tour chronology
Biniverse World Tour 2025 (2025)	Signals World Tour 2026 (2026)

The Signals World Tour 2026 was the third concert tour by the Filipino girl group Bini. The tour began on June 20, 2026, at the SM Mall of Asia Arena in Pasay. The shows spanned multiple cities, including Cebu, and various countries across Europe, North America, Oceania, and Asia.

== Background ==
On April 11, 2026, Bini performed at Coachella 2026, becoming the first Filipino act to appear at the music festival. Their setlist included "Shagidi", "Zero Pressure", "Out of my Head", "Karera" (lit. 'Race'), "Salamin, Salamin" (lit. 'Mirror, Mirror'), "Blink Twice", "Cherry on Top (Remix)", "Blush", "Bikini", and "Pantropiko (Remix)". They also released their third extended play (EP) Signals on April 9, 2026. On April 13, 2026, the announcement for the Signals World Tour was made on their official social media channels. The tour will begin on June 20, 2026, at the SM Mall of Asia Arena in Pasay. It will include performances in performances in multiple cities across various countries such as the United Kingdom, Canada, Netherlands, Italy, France, Switzerland, Germany, Australia, New Zealand, Singapore, Taiwan, and the United States. The world tour is being presented by ABS-CBN Events, Star Magic, ABS-CBN Studios, ABS-CBN Music, and their international agency The Team.

On July 1, 2026, Bini postoponed the tour's European leg, citing "unforeseen circumstances".

== Ticket sales ==
Ticket sales for the tour will be managed by various ticketing agencies depending on the region. In the Philippines, SM Tickets primarily handled ticket sales for the kickoff shows with ticket prices ranging from ₱1,400 to ₱11,500 for both the SM Mall of Asia Arena and SM Seaside Cebu Arena kickoff shows. The first show quickly sold out within just a few hours of the ticket release on April 16. Due to unprecedented demand, a second day was announced for the show 2 days later. Ticket sales will commence on May 11, 2026, for Bloom Membership, (Note: Bloom Membership is an exclusive program on Weverse, which fans receive perks, such as early access to ticket sales.) on May 12, for Local Presales, on May 13, for the Spotify presale, and on May 15, for the general on-sale. Ticket prices ranged from ₱1,399 (US$28.41) to ₱11,499 (US$233.48).

For the North American shows, Ticketmaster handled ticket sales. The Las Vegas presale will began on May 11, 2026, followed by general public sale on May 15.

== Set list ==
The following set list is from the shows at the SM Mall of Asia Arena, Pasay on June 20 and 21, 2026. It does not represent all shows throughout the tour.

- "Unang Kilig"
- "I Feel Good"
- "Ang Huling Cha Cha"
- "Lagi"
- "Diyan Ka Lang"
- "Na Na Na"
- "Katabi"
- "Sweet Tooth"
- "Sugar Rush"
- "Step Back"
- "Honey Honey"
- "Tic Tac Toe"
- "B HU U R" (danced by the A-Team Dance Group)
- "Duyan" (performance by Aiah, Colet, Jhoanna, and Sheena)
- "Kakaibabe" (performance by Mikha, Stacey, Gwen, and Maloi)
- "Golden Arrow" (band only)
- "Besties" (performed by the Besties)
- "Shagidi" (Day 1)
- "Strings" (Day 2)
- "Zero Pressure"
- "Out of my Head"
- "Karera"
- "Salamin, Salamin"
- "Blink Twice"
- "Cherry on Top"
- "A Parallel World" (OST for DreamWorks Animation's Forgotten Island, snippet)
- "Blush"
- "Bikini"
- "Pantropiko"

== Tour dates ==
List of concert tour dates, showing city, country, and venue
Date (2026)	City	Country	Venue	Attendance	Revenue
June 20	Pasay (Note: Labeled as Manila in the promotional material.)	Philippines	SM Mall of Asia Arena	20,800	$1,944,786
June 21	Pasay	Philippines	SM Mall of Asia Arena	20,800	$1,944,786
July 11	Cebu City	Philippines	SM Seaside Cebu Arena	12,000	$1,096,070
August 1	Honolulu	United States	Neal S. Blaisdell Center	2,871	—
August 5	Los Angeles	United States	Peacock Theater	4,616	$276,355
August 7	Rohnert Park	United States	Graton Resort & Casino	1,318	—
August 8	Las Vegas	United States	Planet Hollywood	3,336	—
August 9	San Diego	United States	San Diego Civic Theatre	—	—
August 18	Vancouver	Canada	Queen Elizabeth Theatre	1,961	—
August 21	Calgary	Canada	Grey Eagle Resort & Casino	2,134	—
August 22	Edmonton	Canada	Edmonton Expo Centre	3,367	—
August 24	Winnipeg	Canada	Canada Life Centre	5,000	—
August 27	Toronto	Canada	Sobeys Stadium	8,143	—
August 28	New York City (Note: Labeled as Brooklyn in the promotional material.)	United States	Kings Theatre	3,131	—
September 20	Melbourne	Australia	Melbourne Convention and Exhibition Centre	—	—
September 25	Auckland	New Zealand	Eventfinda Stadium	—	—
September 27	Sydney	Australia	TikTok Entertainment Centre	7,000	—
October 25	Singapore		Arena @ Expo	—	—
November 15	New Taipei City (Note: Labeled Taipei City in the promotional material.)	Taiwan	New Taipei City Exhibition Hall	—	—
Total				—	—

=== Cancelled shows ===
List of cancelled concerts, showing date, city, country, venue, and reason
Date (2026)	City	Country	Venue	Reason
August 30	Amsterdam	Netherlands	AFAS Live	Unforeseen circumstances
September 1	Rome	Italy	Auditorium Parco della Musica	Unforeseen circumstances
September 4	Paris	France	Le Zénith	Unforeseen circumstances
September 6	London	United Kingdom	Wembley Arena	Unforeseen circumstances
September 9	Zurich	Switzerland	Komplex 457	Unforeseen circumstances
September 11	Düsseldorf	Germany	Mitsubishi Electric Halle	Unforeseen circumstances

== Accolades ==
Award	Year	Category	Result	Ref.
Filipino Music Awards	2026	Tour of the Year	Won	
