= Zero Pressure =

- Promotional image

Song by Bini

from the EP Biniverse
- Released: February 27, 2025
- Genre: Synth-pop
- Length: 2:50
- Label: Star
- Composers: Elle Campbell; Melanie Fontana; Michael "Lindgren" Schulz; Skylar Mones
- Producers: Michael "Lindgren" Schulz; Skylar Mones

Music video
- "Zero Pressure" on YouTube

"Zero Pressure" is a song recorded by the Filipino girl group Bini. Combining elements of 1980s synth-pop and funk, the song lyrically focuses on ambition and the value of hard work. Star Music released it on February 27, 2025, as part of the extended play (EP) Biniverse. The song was written by Elle Campbell, Melanie Fontana, Michael "Lindgren" Schulz, and Skylar Mones, and produced by Schulz and Mones. On May 16, Bini released an official performance video for the song, marking their first since "Pantropiko". Filmed at Ayala Malls Manila Bay, the video features choreography by Renan and Kitkan.

"Zero Pressure" topped the YouTube Philippines Trending for Music chart following the release of its performance on May 16, surpassing one million views. Billboard Philippines described it as a "breezy, feel-good anthem that radiates confidence, freedom, and self-love", highlighting its vibrant energy and empowering message. The song was included in the magazine's fan-voted list of the best songs of 2025. San Francisco Chronicle noted that it showcased a more "sophisticated" sound for the group.

== Background and release ==
In February 2025, during the first show of their Biniverse World Tour at the Philippine Arena, Bini announced that they would release their first all-English extended play (EP), Biniverse. The EP was released a few weeks later, on February 27, and included the previously released singles "Cherry on Top" and "Blink Twice", as well as new tracks such as "Zero Pressure".

A teaser for the single's dance performance was performed by Bini at the Aurora Music Festival in early May. On May 16, Bini released an official performance video for "Zero Pressure", their first since "Pantropiko". It was shot at A:Museum in Ayala Malls Manila Bay and features choreography by Renan and Kitkan, who had previously choreographed for other girl groups such as Aespa, I-dle, and XG. Among other sources, ABS-CBN News and ABS-CBN Corporate have described "Zero Pressure" as a single. The post-credits scene of the video features a teaser for Bini's succeeding song, "Shagidi". At Bini's homecoming event marking the end of the Biniverse World Tour 2025 at the SM Mall of Asia Arena on June 29, titled "Here With You" Homecoming Fan Meet, the group held their first full performance of the "Zero Pressure".

== Composition and lyrics ==
"Zero Pressure"
An 18-second sample of "Zero Pressure", where the chorus and the lyric "Zero pressure, zero diamonds" can be heard.

"Zero Pressure" is two minutes and fifty seconds long. It is a 1980s-inspired synth-pop song with a funk influence. Its lyrics talk about ambition and perseverance. The song was written by Skylar Mones, Michael "Lindgren" Schulz, Melanie Fontana, and Elle Campbell, with vocal arrangement by Anna Achacoso-Graham. Lindgren and Mones produced the song, with vocal production by Greg Shilling, mixing by Dan Naim, mastering by Leon Zervos, and surround mixing by Waxie G. Joaquin. The song was composed at the same songwriting camp where "Cherry on Top" was created, and recorded by Chris "Moophs" Lopez.

In an interview with Genius' Sofia Sayson, Bini member Colet explained that the song, especially the lyric "Zero pressure, zero diamonds", reflects Bini's journey as a group, emphasizing that, like diamonds, their growth required enduring pressure, hard work, and persistent searching.

== Reception ==
Following its release on May 16, the performance video topped the YouTube Philippines Trending for Music, surpassing one million views. Billboard Philippines described "Zero Pressure" as a "breezy, feel-good anthem that radiates confidence, freedom, and self-love" and praised its "vibrant" energy and "empowering" message. The track was included in the magazine's fan-voted list of the best songs of 2025. Ralph Regis of Billboard Philippines included the track in "Play Pretend: Here are 12 OPM Artists Perfect for these Game Soundtracks". He described that the high energy pop song in vein of "Zero Pressure" complements the intensity of Mobile Legends: Bang Bang (2016).

Todd Inoue of the San Francisco Chronicle wrote that the song was a more "sophisticated" sound for the group. Andros Resurreccion and Sonal Lad of &Asian included the song on their list of "10 Songs that Could be on a Soundtrack to WWE PPV/PLE". They described the song as focusing on atmosphere over intensity with a comparison to use of "Less than Zero" by The Weeknd as the theme for WrestleMania 39. They also suggested that it complements viewing older WrestleMania matches that are remembered more for their lasting impact than for spectacle.

== In popular culture ==
In May 2025, Jake "Boaster" Howlett of the professional esports team Fnatic danced to "Zero Pressure" during his walk-off at the Valorant Champions Tour Grand Finals. On Halloween 2025, Filipino actor Bong Gonzales of Love at First Spike recreated Bini member Gwen's teaser photo for "Zero Pressure."

== Listicles ==
Publisher	Year	Listicle	Placement	Ref.
&Asian	2026	10 Songs That Could Be on a Soundtrack to WWE PPV/PLE	Placed	
Billboard Philippines	2025	The Top Music Releases of 2025 (So Far) — According to Billboard Philippines' Readers	Placed	
Forbes	2025	10 Song Recommendations If You Love Huntrix's 'Golden' From 'KPop Demon Hunters'	Placed	

== Credits and personnel ==
Credits are adapted from Apple Music and Tidal.

- Bini – vocals
- 51000 Feet Music – music publisher
- ABS-CBN Film Productions Inc. – music publisher
- Almo Music Corp – music publisher
- Anna Achacoso-Graham – vocal arrangement
- Waxie G. Joaquin – surround mixing
- Chris "Moophs" Lopez – recording
- Dan Naim – mixing
- Kobalt Songs Music Publishing – music publisher
- Leon Zervos – mastering
- Sony/ATV Ballad – music publisher
- These Are Songs of Pulse – music publisher
- Tinkermel Music Creations – music publisher
- Wide Eyed Ent – music publisher
