= Biniverse =

Biniverse is a term used by the Filipino girl group Bini.

Biniverse may refer to:

- Biniverse (tour), a 2024 concert tour by Bini
- Biniverse (EP), a 2025 extended play by Bini
- Biniverse World Tour 2025, a 2025 concert tour by Bini

== See also ==
- Biniversus, a web television variety show by Bini
