= Blink Twice (Bini song) =

Single by Bini

from the EP Biniverse
- Released: February 13, 2025
- Genre: Pop; R&B
- Length: 2:33
- Label: Star
- Songwriters: Steven Franks; Amanda Ratchford; Oneye; Marqueze Parker; Pacific-Joshua Zagabe; Darius Coleman
- Producers: Oneye; Leather Jacket; Steven Franks; Glitch

Bini singles chronology
"Joy to the World" (2024)	"Blink Twice" (2025)	"Shagidi" (2025)

"Blink Twice (Dos Veces Remix)"

Belinda singles chronology
"La Cuadrada" (2025)	"Blink Twice (Dos Veces Remix)" (2025)	"Mírame Feliz" (2025)

Music video
- "Blink Twice" on YouTube

"Blink Twice" is a song by the Filipino girl group Bini. It was released on February 13, 2025, by Star Music as the second pre-single for their second extended play Biniverse. The song was produced by Steven Franks, Amanda Ratchford, Oneye, Marqueze Parker, Pacific-Joshua Zagabe, and Darius Coleman credited as a songwriter. "Blink Twice" is a pop and R&B track that explores the theme of a woman taking the first move in a romantic relationship while looking for a sign that her feelings are reciprocated.

The song's music video surpassed one million views within 12 hours of its release and trended on YouTube in multiple territories, peaking at number one in the Philippines. They have made multiple live performances, including their debut on the morning television show Good Day New York. The song received positive to mixed reviews from music critics. It was debuted at number seven on the Billboard Philippines Hot 100 and number four on Top Philippine Songs chart. The song also reached number seven on the Official Philippines Chart of Official Southeast Asia Charts. It entered the monthly Top P-pop Songs chart at number two and place at ninety-six on the year-end Billboard Philippines Hot 100. Internationally, it peaked at number twenty-four on New Zealand's Hot Singles chart by Recorded Music NZ. In the United Kingdom, it reached number twenty-seven on the UK Singles Downloads chart and number thirty-one on the UK Singles Sales chart. The song have multiple accolades, including the International Collaboration of the Year at the 2025 BreakTudo Awards.

== Background and release ==
Following the commercial success of their singles "Pantropiko", "Salamin, Salamin", and "Cherry on Top" in 2024, Bini embarked on their first concert tour Biniverse, which was succeeded by a three-evening event held at the Araneta Coliseum titled The Grand Biniverse in November. On November 19, the last night of the event, the group announced that they would be releasing the single "Blink Twice" the following year and that they would be hosting their next concert, Grand Biniverse: The Valentine Repeat, on February 15, 2025, at the Philippine Arena. Teasers for the single, including a five-second snippet, an eye-doctor-themed promotional image, and the single's cover art, were shared on Bini's social media platforms. It was later revealed that the single would be released on February 13, two days before the scheduled Valentine concert, which would serve as the opening show for Biniverse World Tour 2025.

"Blink Twice" was released on February 13, 2025, alongside an accompanying music video. The song marked the group's first release after their contract renewal with Star Music and ABS-CBN on February 4. It was first publicly performed by Bini at the Grand Biniverse: The Valentine Repeat concert on February 15, during which it was revealed to be part of an upcoming EP titled Biniverse, which was released on February 27 and includes the previously released 2024 singles "Cherry on Top" and its "BiniMo" remix with Agnez Mo. On March 14, Bini released "Blink Twice (Dos Veces (Note: "Twice" in Spanish.) Remix)" on March 14 with Mexican singer Belinda.

== Composition and lyrics ==
"Blink Twice"
A 23-second sample of "Blink Twice" where the chorus and pre-chorus can be heard with a mix of R&B.

"Blink Twice (Dos Veces Remix)"
A 23-second sample of "Blink Twice (Dos Veces Remix)" of Mexican singer Belinda Peregrín singing with Spanish language.

"Blink Twice" is an upbeat English-language pop track with R&B elements. The song evokes pop music from the early 2000s. Jhoanna, the group leader of Bini, revealed the song to be a new sound for the girl group, noting its distinct sound and chill vibe which they consider to be unique in their discography. Lyrically, "Blink Twice" is about a woman romantically making the first move and searching for signs that her love interest returns her feelings. In an interview with Teen Vogue, Jhoanna explained that the song's themes of self-assertiveness and taking action may extend beyond romance, adding, "This can also apply to life in general or the dreams you want to chase. We want to empower young women to own their choices and take the first step, as long as that's what they believe will help them."

During Bini's renewal of their contract with ABS-CBN on February 4, 2025, the group confirmed that they had worked on the single with international producers and songwriters. These included songwriters Amanda Ratchford, Pacific-Joshua Zagabe, Marqueze Parker, Darius Coleman, Pontus Kalm (Oneye), and Steven Franks (Mr. Franks). Oneye, Leather Jacket, Mr. Franks, and Glitch produced the track under ABS-CBN Music International.

== Reception ==
=== Critical reception ===
"Blink Twice" ratings
Review scores
Source	Rating
One Music Philippines	3.5/5 stars

"Blink Twice" received positive to mixed reviews from music critics. Gabriel Saulog of Billboard Philippines said that the song's "spice" makes it stand out from Bini's past releases. Likewise, Todd Inoue of the San Francisco Chronicle, an American newspaper, wrote that "Blink Twice" provides a more "sophisticated" sound for the group, compared to their past singles. Writing for the Latin American-oriented magazine Remezcla, Ivana E. Morales called the "Blink Twice" remix with Belinda an "alchemy of sound and artistry" that transcends language barriers. Nica Glorioso of Nylon Manila observed that women are "often shamed" for expressing their desires, and that many men show a lack of respect for women. Thus, she lauded the lyrics of "Blink Twice" for subverting the notion that women should always wait to be pursued, rather than making the first move.

On the other hand, Rolling Stone Philippines' Mel Wang reported that the track's use of English, rather than Tagalog, has created concerns among the general public that the group may be losing their Filipino identity. They concluded that "Blink Twice" represents Bini's dilemma of "staying true to their Filipino roots while also appealing to a broader, more global audience". Cris O. Ramos of One Music Philippines wrote that the song "may make you yearn and crave for the kind of chemistry the girls had with FlipMusic", but complimented its "straightforward" nature. He gave "Blink Twice" 3.5 out of 5 stars. &Asian's Julienne Loreto and Maddie Armstrong criticized the musical aspects of the song. They wrote that "Blink Twice" was "repetitive" and "monotonous", adding that the track "lacks the punch and speed that its charming lyrics call for". They concluded that the song was "cute" but did not suit Bini.

=== Commercial performance ===
Following its release on February 13, "Blink Twice" debuted at number seven on the Philippine Hot 100 and number four on the Top Philippine Songs chart. It peaked at number seven on the Official Philippines Chart of the Official Southeast Asia. The song also reached number two on the Billboard Philippines Top P-pop Songs monthly chart and placed at number ninety-six on the 2025 year-end chart. Internationally, the song entered multiple charts, including a debut at number twenty-four on New Zealand's Hot Singles chart and number thirty-one on the United Kingdom's UK Singles Sales Chart and twenty-seven on the UK Singles Downloads Chart.

== Music video ==
Directed by Kerbs Balagtas, the music video was released together with the single on February 13, 2025. It depicts Bini dressed in brightly themed outfits as they find themselves at a pastel-colored futuristic clinic and a secret laboratory, where they get checked for a fictional medical condition. Throughout the video, the members switch back and forth between simpler, more minimalistic visuals and bolder, more dramatic beauty looks. For the latter, Bini's makeup and styling team drew inspiration from Latina styles and heavily utilized shades of red, such as burgundy and magenta.

The music video garnered one million views in under 12 hours since its premiere, landing a spot on YouTube's trending list across multiple territories, including the Philippines at number one.

== Live performances ==
Bini performed "Blink Twice" live for the first time at the Grand Biniverse: The Valentine Repeat Concert, held at the Philippine Arena on February 15, 2025. The following day, the group showcased the song on ASAP Natin 'To. On April 25, they performed it on the Billboard Philippines Studios series, with revised dance arrangements to accommodate Sheena's absence due to illness. During their stop on New York for their 2025 world tour, Bini performed "Blink Twice" on the morning TV show Good Day New York on June 2.

== Awards and nominations ==
Award	Year (Note: Indicates the year of the ceremony. Each year is linked to the article about the awards held that year, wherever possible.)	Category	Recipient(s)	Result	Ref.
BreakTudo Awards	2025	International Collaboration of the Year	"Blink Twice (Remix)" (with Belinda)	Won	
Filipino Music Awards	2025	People’s Choice Awards: Song	"Blink Twice"	Nominated	
P-pop Music Awards	2025	Song of the Year	"Blink Twice"	Nominated	
P-pop Music Awards	2025	Music Video of the Year	"Blink Twice"	Nominated	
P-pop Music Awards	2025	Best Production Design in a Music Video	"Blink Twice"	Won	
Wish Music Awards	2026	Wishclusive Pop Song of the Year	"Blink Twice"	Nominated	

== Credits and personnel ==
Credits are adapted by Apple Music and Tidal.

- Bini – vocals
- ABS-CBN Film Productions – music publisher
- Amanda Ratchford – songwriter
- Anna Achacoso-Graham – vocal arranger
- BMG Gold Songs – music publisher
- CallMe Parker Music – music publisher
- Champagne Theraphy Publishing – music publisher
- Dairus Coleman – songwriter
- Dan Naim – mixing engineer, recording engineer
- Glitch – producer
- Greg Shilling – vocal producer
- Leather Jacket – producer
- Lily Raye Music – music publisher
- Leon Zervos – mastering engineer
- Marqueze Parker – songwriter
- Oneye – producer
- Pacific-Joshua Zagabe – songwriter
- Reservoir Media Management, Inc. – music publisher
- Reservoir Media Music – music publisher
- Songs of Universal, Inc. – music publisher
- Steven Franks – songwriter, producer
- Warner Chappell Scandinavia – music publisher

== Charts ==
=== Weekly charts ===
Weekly chart performance for "Blink Twice"
Chart (2025)	Peak position
New Zealand Hot Singles (RMNZ)	24
Official Philippines Chart (IFPI)	7
Philippines Hot 100 (Billboard Philippines)	7
Top Philippine Songs (Billboard Philippines)	4
UK Singles Downloads (OCC)	27
UK Singles Sales (OCC)	31

=== Monthly charts ===
Monthly chart performance for "Blink Twice"
Chart (2025)	Peak position
Philippines P-pop Songs (Billboard Philippines)	2

=== Year-end charts ===
Chart (2025)	Position
Philippines Hot 100 (Billboard Philippines)	96
