= Biniverse World Tour 2025 =

2025 Concert tour by Bini

- World tour by Bini
- Promotional poster
- Location: Asia; Europe; North America
- Associated album: Biniverse
- Start date: February 15, 2025
- End date: June 21, 2025
- No. of shows: 16
- Guests: Maki; eaJ
- Supporting acts: Clarissa Mae; Ashley Mehta
- Attendance: 115,935
Bini tour chronology
Biniverse (2024)	Biniverse World Tour 2025 (2025)	Signals World Tour 2026 (2026)

The Biniverse World Tour 2025 (stylized as BINIverse World Tour 2025) was the second concert tour by Filipino girl group Bini. The tour began on February 15, 2025, at the Philippine Arena in Bulacan. The shows spanned multiple cities, including Dubai, London, key cities in the United States, Vancouver in Canada. The tour concluded on June 21, 2025.

The show at the Philippine Arena made Bini the first Filipino act to hold a sold-out concert in the arena. The Philippine show also saw the first live performance of the group's single, "Blink Twice".

== Background ==
On June 30, 2024, at the end of their three-night show at the New Frontier Theater in Quezon City for the Biniverse tour, Bini announced that they would hold Grand Biniverse at the Araneta Coliseum in October 2024. The concert was later moved to November 16 and 17 following concerns to the group's health by fans. A third day was announced following immediate sold-out of the first and second day of the concert. Tickets for the third date were also immediately sold-out. On November 15, ABS-CBN announced that the second day, which was scheduled on November 17, would be moved to November 19 following safety concerns due to Super Typhoon Pepito (Man-yi).

At the end of the third day of the Grand Biniverse concert, Bini announced that they would hold another concert titled "Grand Biniverse: The Valentine Repeat" on February 15, 2025, at the Philippine Arena in Santa Maria, Bulacan. The concert made the group the first Filipino act to host a solo concert at the Philippine Arena. On December 19, 2024, the group announced that the Philippine Arena concert would be the first show of their then-upcoming world tour, titled "Biniverse World Tour 2025". The tour would span several cities, including Dubai, London, and key cities in the United States, with additional cities yet to be announced. At the end of the tour, a homecoming fan meet by the group was held on June 29, 2025 at the SM Mall of Asia Arena in Pasay.

While the North American leg of the tour was underway, Bini released a single titled "Shagidi" on June 5, which was inspired by a traditional Filipino children’s game.

== Ticket sales ==
Ticket sales for the tour will be managed by various ticketing agencies depending on the region. In the Philippines, Pulp Tickets and TicketNet handled ticket sales. The presale of tickets for Bini's website exclusive members (Note: Bini's website, bini.global, has an exclusive membership program in which fans can receive perks, such as early access to ticket sales.) started on December 27, 2024, while sales for the general public began on December 28. Ticket prices ranged from ₱1,800 to ₱11,800. The presale tickets immediately sold-out on the same day they were released. The remaining tickets were sold-out hours before the concert began, making Bini the first Filipino act to hold a sold-out solo concert at the Philippine Arena, which has a capacity of 55,000 seats.

Tickets for the Dubai show went on presale on February 19, 2025, followed by the general public sale on February 21. Ticket prices ranged from DH 445 to DH 690. The show was organized by All Things Live Middle East (Note: All Things Live Middle East is a Dubai-based entertainment company under the European live entertainment group All Things Live.) and supported by Dubai Calendar (Note: Dubai Calendar is the city's official event listing platform.).

For the London and North American shows, Ticketmaster handled ticket sales. The London presale began on February 18, followed by the general public sale on February 21. Additionally, tickets were made available through the O2 Priority mobile app on February 19.

== Transportation ==
In January 2025, ABS-CBN announced that they would organize a round-trip bus shuttle service to the Philippine Arena, with main pick-up points at the Solaire ASEAN in Parañaque, One Ayala Terminal in Makati, UPark Megamall in Mandaluyong, Baliwag Bus Terminal in Cubao, Quezon City, and SM North EDSA. Days prior to the Philippine concert, authorities of the North Luzon Expressway (NLEX) issued a traffic advisory due to the anticipated heavy traffic that the concert may cause.

== Guest performers ==
On February 15, 2025, during Bini's kickoff show at the Philippine Arena, Maki made a guest appearance and performed his singles "Namumula" and "Dilaw". On May 25, Filipino-British singer Clarissa Mae served as the opening act for the London show, performing an acoustic cover of Estelle's "American Boy" and her self-produced, unreleased song. On June 14, during their Los Angeles show, South Korean artist eaJ joined the group on stage for a live performance of their collaboration track, "Secrets". Ashley Mehta, an American singer of Filipino and Indian descent, was the San Francisco concert's opening act.

== Concert synopsis ==
=== Philippine Arena ===
The Philippine Arena concert saw Bini open the act with a rendition of "Salamin, Salamin" arranged by the Orchestra of the Filipino Youth. Their rendition of "I Feel Good" saw the group's members travel on carts to interact with audiences throughout the arena. Throughout the concert, Bini's member performed a series of duo performances. The group also performed their single, "Blink Twice", in public for the first time since it was released two days prior on February 13, as well as "Kinikilig" and "Golden Arrow", two singles from their first album, Born to Win, that were utilized in a live performance for the first time. They also performed a ballad version of "Lagi" and an R&B version of "Ang Huling Cha Cha". For their rendition of "Huwag Muna Tayong Umuwi", the group members separately proceeded to the upper floors of the arena and interacted with the audience. The group also announced the release of an upcoming extended play (EP), titled Biniverse, on February 27. Throughout the concert, Bini underwent multiple wardrobe changes featuring designs by Raf Villas, Marian Zara, Inigo Villegas, Namilia, and Anthony Ramirez.

The group was also officially recognized during the program by Billboard Philippines as the country's No. 1 Top Artist of 2024, No. 1 Artist for the Hot 100, and Philippines' Top Songs. They also received their trophy from the MTV European Music Awards for Best Asia Act. The concert also saw Bini being unveiled as the newest endorsers of a chocolate drink brand.

=== Dubai ===
On May 16, 2025, Bini arrived in Dubai for the first stop of the international leg of the Biniverse World Tour. On the eve of the concert, they received a certificate of commendation in recognition of their exemplary awards and invaluable contributions to the promotion of Filipino pop culture from the Philippine Consulate General in Dubai.

The Dubai concert proceeded as scheduled at the Coca-Cola Arena on May 18 with more than 10,000 in attendance. During the second set, Aiah experienced severe cramps and was taken offstage in a wheelchair before later returning to perform, albeit seated. Apart from their discography, Maloi and Stacey performed several dances that went viral on TikTok, including "Like Jennie". A teaser was also released for a new documentary about Bini. Aiah eventually recovered to perform "Pantropiko" while standing up. The concert was generally praised by fans, although criticism was leveled at the absence of LED jumbotrons or side monitors at the venue that prevented many onlookers from seeing the performances clearly.

=== London ===
Biniverse in London took place at the Wembley Arena on May 25. Speakers inside the venue played songs by Maki, Maymay Entrata, and BGYO prior to Filipino-British singer Clarissa Mae's opening act. She performed an acoustic cover of "American Boy" by Estelle, as well as her unreleased song.

Following Mae's performances, an orchestral medley of Bini songs, including "Diyan Ka Lang" (transl. Just Stay There), played as the members appeared with the word "London" behind them in big, glowing letters. Bini sang bits of "Lagi" (transl. Always), "Pantropiko", "Na Na Na", and "Salamin, Salamin" (transl. Mirror, Mirror), pointing their microphones towards the audience so they would sing the lyrics back. The latter song became their first full number that night.

The Bini members performed "No Fear", "I Feel Good", "Born to Win", "Karera" (transl. Race), and "Strings" next. They then performed "Lagi" in its original vocal arrangement. A Positively Filipino article named Colet's final chorus to be the song and concert's "highlight of all highlights", observing that though the notes were even higher than Maloi and Jhoanna's bridge and she continued to dance, Colet's belts "remained stunningly full and clear".

The group then performed "Diyan Ka Lang", "Blink Twice", "Cherry on Top", "Zero Pressure", the Biniverse arrangement of "Na Na Nandito Lang" (transl. Just Here), "Here With You", and "Huwag Muna Tayong Umuwi" (transl. Let's Not Go Home Yet). They dedicated the ballads to the homesick Filipinos in the UK. Their encore songs were "Na Na Na" and "Pantropiko".

=== Toronto ===
The first concrt of the North American tour was held in the Coca-Cola Coliseum. The set began with "Salamin, Salamin" and the show also included newer tracks like “Blink Twice,” “Zero Pressure,” "Secrets", and “Out Of My Head”. Previously released shows such as "Cherry On Top" and "Karera," among others, were also featured, The show closed out with an extended version of "Pantropiko".

=== San Francisco ===
The San Francisco leg took place on June 17, at the Bill Graham Civic Auditorium. Ashley Mehta, an American singer of Filipino and Indian descent, opened the show. Bini's first number was "Salamin, Salamin". "I Feel Good", "Lagi", "Blink Twice", "Na Na Nandito Lang", and "Huwag Muna Tayong Umuwi" were among some of the other songs on the set list. The group closed the show with "Pantropiko".

=== Seattle ===
The tour's penultimate show was held in Paramount Theatre, Seattle. Bini reportedly performed songs like "Cherry On Top," "Pantrapiko," and "Salamin, Salamin," and their first all-English songs from the extended playlist "BINIverse".

=== Vancouver ===
The last stop of the world tour took place in Thunderbird Sports Centre in Vancoiver, Canada. Bini opened the show with “Salamin, Salamin,” “No Fear,” and “I Feel Good”. These were followed by “Lagi”, “Cherry On Top”, “Diyan Ka Lang” , “Karera”, “Blink Twice,” “Shagidi,” and “Out Of My Head". Other highlights of the night featured the songs “Na Na Nandito Lang,” “Here With You,” and “Huwag Muna Tayong Umuwi,” during which Aiah, Mikha, Maloi, and Jhoanna walked through the audience, followed by Gwen, Sheena, Colet, and Stacey during the song, “Na Na Na". “Pantropiko” served as the penultimate song of the night complete with its viral dance break. Bini surprised the audience by closing with their pre-debut single, “Da Coconut Nut” as a tribute to where it all began.

=== Homecoming ===
At the homecoming event on June 29, titled the "Here With You" Homecoming Fan Meet, Bini conducted their first performances of the tracks "Out of My Head", "Shagidi" and "Zero Pressure". They also publicly donated ₱362,000 raised from sales of their merchandise in charity to the ABS-CBN Foundation and launched their eponymous cosmetics brand. A competition was also held among the individual members' official fan clubs for the best fan booth at the event.

== Set list ==
This set list was taken from the show in Bocaue on February 15, 2025. It does not represent all shows throughout the tour.

1. "Salamin, Salamin"
2. "No Fear"
3. "I Feel Good"
4. "Lagi"
5. "Ang Huling Cha Cha"
6. "Diyan Ka Lang"
7. "Lose My Breath" (Duo performance by Aiah and Stacey)
8. "When I Grow Up" (Duo performance by Maloi and Jhoanna)
9. "Born to Win"
10. "Strings"
11. "Cherry on Top"
12. "Namumula" (performed by Maki)
13. "Dilaw" (performed by Maki)
14. "My Oh My" / "Bad" (Duo performance by Mikha and Gwen)
15. "Billie Jean" / "Smooth Criminal" (Duo performance by Colet and Sheena)
16. "Kinikilig"
17. "Golden Arrow"
18. "Karera"
19. "Na Na Nandito Lang"
20. "Here With You"
21. "Blooming"
22. "Blink Twice"
23. "Huwag Muna Tayong Umuwi"
24. "Na Na Na"
25. "Pantropiko"

== Tour dates ==
List of concert tour dates, showing city, country, and venue
Date (2025)	City	Country	Venue	Attendance
February 15	Santa Maria	Philippines	Philippine Arena	55,000
May 18	Dubai	United Arab Emirates	Coca-Cola Arena	10,000
May 25	London	United Kingdom	OVO Wembley Arena	11,832
May 30	Toronto	Canada	Coca-Cola Coliseum	5,550
May 31	New York City	United States	The Theater at Madison Square Garden	4,085
June 3	National Harbor (Note: Labeled as Washington, D.C. in the promotional material.)	United States	The Theater at MGM National Harbor	1,887
June 4	Boston	United States	MGM Music Hall at Fenway	—
June 6	Rosemont	United States	Rosemont Theatre	3,054
June 9	Houston	United States	713 Music Hall	2,111
June 10	Irving (Note: Labeled as Dallas in the promotional material.)	United States	Toyota Music Factory	2,652
June 13	Paradise (Note: Labeled as Las Vegas in the promotional material.)	United States	The Theater at Virgin Hotels	2,468
June 14	Los Angeles	United States	Peacock Theater	4,117
June 15	Temecula	United States	The Summit at Pechanga Resort Casino	3,228
June 17	San Francisco	United States	Bill Graham Civic Auditorium	4,060
June 20	Seattle	United States	Paramount Theatre	1,736
June 21	Vancouver	Canada	Thunderbird Sports Centre	4,159
Total				115,935

== Streaming ==
A six-episode documentary series on the tour, titled Bini World Tour Stories, is scheduled for release on iWantTFC in September 2025.

== Accolades ==
Awards and nominations received by Bini
Award	Year	Category	Result	Ref.
Filipino Music Awards	2025	Tour of the Year	Nominated	
