= Isa Pang Araw =

Single by Sarah Geronimo

from the album Miss Granny (Original Movie Soundtrack)
- Released: July 13, 2018
- Recorded: 2018
- Genre: Pop
- Length: 3:40
- Label: Viva Records
- Songwriter: Miguel Mendoza III

Sarah Geronimo singles chronology
"Kiss Me, Kiss Me" (2018)	"Isa Pang Araw" (2018)

Music video
- "Isa Pang Araw" on YouTube

"Isa Pang Araw" (English: One More Day) is a song by Filipino singer-actress Sarah Geronimo, composed by Miguel Mendoza III. It was used as theme song of Geronimo's film Miss Granny released in 2018 under Viva Films. It was nominated for "Best Original Song" at the 67th FAMAS Awards. The song was included on Spotify Philippines' Top OPM Songs of 2018. At the 32nd edition of Awit Awards, the song won Best Performance by a Female Recording Artist and Best Song Written and Performed for a Movie/TV/Stage Play.

== Live performances ==
Sarah Geronimo performed the song on various promotional mall tours for Miss Granny. The song made its Television debut when Geronimo performed the song on ASAP Natin 'To stage with Regine Velasquez on November 18, 2018. The song was included on Geronimo's repertoire for her This 15 Me World Tour on selected shows.

== Music video ==
The music video of the song was directed by Carlo Alvarez and was released on August 11, 2018.

== Cover versions ==
- April Luz Tolentino sung the song on It's Showtime's Tawag ng Tanghalan in January 2018.
- Another Tawag ng Tanghalan contender named Juliana Ruzelle performed the song in January 2018.
- Idol Philippines contestant Zephanie Dimaranan performed the song on the show for its "Philippines’ Most Streamed Hits" week.
- Singer Sam Mangubat also has his own rendition of the song published on his YouTube channel.
- The Voice Kids Philippines Season 3 contestant Francis Indonto sung the song on the show's blind audition and became part of Bamboo's team.
- Pinoy Dream Academy alumna Miguel Mendoza, the composer of the song uploaded his own version of the song on his YouTube channel.
- Top 20 contestant Cholo Bismonte covered the song on the second round of the third season of The Clash.
- Regine Velasquez did a cover of this song during Unified concert in 2020, before COVID-19 pandemic.
- Jhoanna of the P-pop girl group Bini covered the song in a rendition accompanied by a string quarter during the group's first solo concert, Biniverse, as part of her solo production segment.

== Awards and nominations ==
Year	Award	Category	Result	Ref.
2019	67th FAMAS Awards	Best Song	Nominated	
2019	3rd Entertainment Editors' Choice Awards for Movies	Best Original Theme Song	Nominated	
2019	32nd Awit Awards	Best Performance by a Female Recording Artist	Won	
2019	32nd Awit Awards	Best Song Written for Movie/TV/Stage Play	Won	
