= Rafi (artist) =

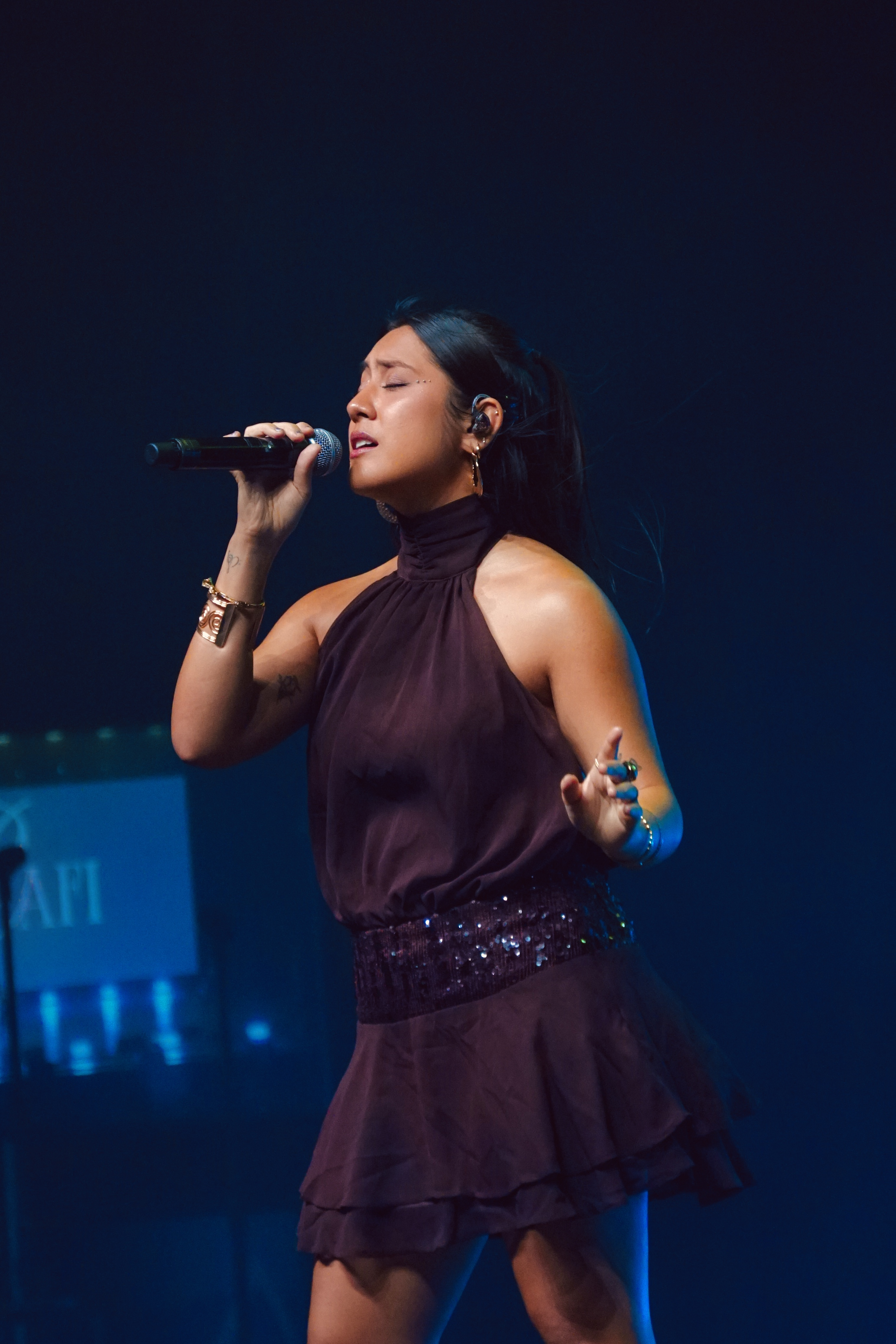
- Rafi performing in San Diego in 2026
- Born: Raphaella Renee Ortega Hernandez; February 18, 2004 (age 22); Cebu City, Philippines
- Education: Berklee College of Music
- Occupations: Singer; songwriter
- Years active: 2019-present
- Agent: Star Magic
- Musical career
- Genres: pop; folk
- Instrument: Vocals

Raphaella Renee Ortega Hernandez (born February 18, 2004), known professionally as Rafi, is a Filipino singer-songwriter. She released her debut song, "What Does It Cost", in 2019 and the EPs before me (2024) and Wound and Wounded (2025).

== Early life ==
Raphaella Renee Ortega Hernandez was born on February 18, 2004, in Cebu City. At age five, she attended musical theater workshops at Repertory Philippines and began vocal studies at the Music School of Ryan Cayabyab at age 11.

She graduated from PAREF Woodrose School for Girls in Alabang in 2022 and enrolled at Berklee College of Music in Boston, where she studied music business and management. She graduated in 2026 and received the school's Music Business Achievement Award.

== Career ==
Rafi released her first song, "What Does It Cost", in August 2019. In July 2024, she released her debut EP, before me. The four-track EP contains the songs "i stay silent", "unpaid debt", "fine wine", and "anything for you".

In December 2025, she released her second EP, Wound and Wounded, consisting of four songs.

In August 2026, Rafi opened for BINI on three dates of the Signals World Tour 2026, in Los Angeles, Las Vegas and San Diego.

== Artistry ==
Rafi's music has been described as pop and folk. Her musical influences include Lizzy McAlpine and Moira Dela Torre.

== Discography ==
=== EPs ===
Title	Details
before me	Released: July 19, 2024
Wound and Wounded	Released: December 12, 2025

=== Singles ===
Title	Year
What Does It Cost	2019
unpaid debt	2024
Wind-Up Doll	2025
This Isn't Who I Am	2026
