= Shagidi =

Single by Bini

from the album Flames
- Language: English; Tagalog
- Released: June 5, 2025
- Genre: Dancehall; hip-hop; pop
- Length: 2:28
- Label: Star
- Songwriters: Angela Ken Rojas; Anna Achoso–Graham; Courtlin Edwards; Jbach; Marqueze Parker; Tommy Brown
- Producers: Greg Shilling; Leather Jacket; Tommy Brown

Bini singles chronology
"Blink Twice" (2025)	"Shagidi" (2025)	"First Luv" (2025)

Music video
- "Shagidi" on YouTube

"Shagidi" is a song recorded by the Filipino girl group Bini as a special single for their Biniverse World Tour 2025. Written by Angela Ken, Anna Achoso-Graham, Courtlin Edwards, JBach, Marqueze Parker, and Tommy Brown, "Shagidi" is a playful and upbeat track inspired by the Filipino children's game, Shagidi Shapopo. The game was introduced and played by ABS-CBN artists Angela Ken, Angia Laurel, and Maymay Entrata alongside various producers during an ABS-CBN music camp held in Davao City in 2024. The song was released by Star Music on June 5, 2025. Its official music video was released on August 8.

== Background and release ==
In February 2025, Bini released the single "Blink Twice" along with its music video. During their Grand Biniverse: The Valentine Repeat concert on February 15, the group announced that the song is part of an extended play (EP) titled Biniverse, which was released on February 27. On March 24, Bini released "Blink Twice (Dos Veces Remix)" featuring Spanish-Mexican singer Belinda. The group later performed the song live on Good Day New York on June 3.

Following the success of "Blink Twice", Bini announced the release of the special tour single "Shagidi". Bini member Maloi Ricalde designed the cover artwork for the single. In May, a teaser for the song was shown in the post-credits scene for the music video of the Bini single "Zero Pressure". Star Music released "Shagidi" on June 5 through digital download and streaming formats.

== Composition ==
"Shagidi"
A 14-second sample of "Shagidi", where a portion of the chorus can be heard.

"Shagidi" is two-minute and twenty-eight seconds long. Musically, it blends the genres of dancehall and pop, with a hip-hop influence. Off-kilter, staccato drum patterns are featured throughout the song, a defining characteristic of dancehall and other genres that derive from reggae. The bridge also incorporates 808 bass.

Lyrically, it draws inspiration from the Filipino children's game Shagidi Shapopo, in which one player calls the moves and the others must follow in sync. Bini's official social media accounts described the song as "a rhythmic game of follow-the-leader". It was written by Angela Ken, Anna Achoso-Graham, Courtlin Edwards, JBach, Marqueze Parker, and Tommy Brown, who also produced the song along with Chris López, Dan Naim, Greg Shilling, Leather Jacket, and Leon Zervos. The song combines cultural elements with modern pop sensibilities, reflecting both Filipino identity and international appeal. "Shagidi" was created after ABS-CBN artists Angela Ken, Angia Laurel, and Maymay Entrata taught the game with its nonsense words to various producers in 2024 at an ABS-CBN music camp in Davao City. The playful interaction became the inspiration for a recording session with the song's composers the following day.

== Live performances ==
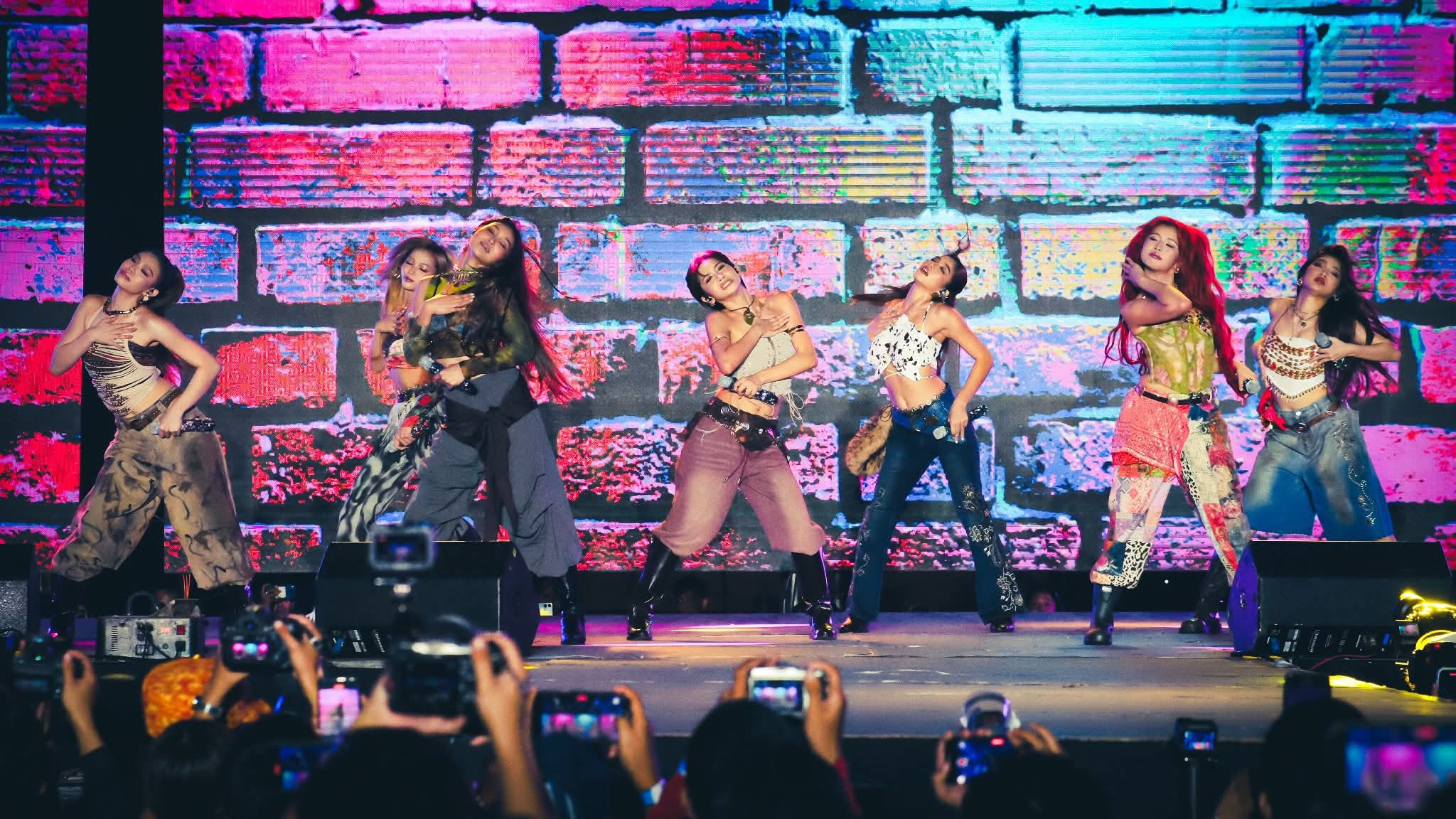
Bini performing "Shagidi" at Ibalong Festival 2025.

Marking the end of the Biniverse World Tour 2025, Bini hosted their Here With You Homecoming Fan Meet at the SM Mall of Asia Arena on June 29, 2025, conducting their first live performance of "Shagidi". On July 5, they performed the song at the Puregold OPM Con 2025 held at the Philippine Arena, alongside Kaia's Charlotte, SB19's Stell, and G22's Alfea. On July 20, they also performed the song at the Star Magic All-Star Games, which were held at the Araneta Coliseum in Quezon City, to conclude the show.

"Shagidi" was also included in Bini's opening lineup in their performance at Coachella 2026 on April 10.

== Reception ==
=== Reviews ===
Julienne Loreto of Pop Journal gave "Shagidi" a positive review, describing the song as "punchy, energetic, and fast-paced". Loreto noted that the layering on the chorus imbues it with an "addictively delirious, anthemic" energy and prevents it from sounding "grating", concluding that the song is "one of Bini's best releases in the past year". GMA Network's Hazel Jane Cruz called the song "campy". Rafael Bautista of Nylon Manila labelled the song as an "east-meets-west track [that] makes for an interesting listen". Jeff Benjamin of Billboard noted similarities to Rosé and Bruno Mars single "Apt.", which adapted a traditional Korean drinking game into a commercially successful track on the Billboard Hot 100.

=== Commercial performance ===
Following its release on June 5, the music video debuted at number four on YouTube Philippines' music category and accumulated over half a million views. The song charted at number 73 on the UK Singles Downloads chart and number 76 on the UK Single Sales chart.

== Music video ==
Bini premiered the music video on August 7, for exclusive members in an exclusive preview screening event in Quezon City. The music video was officially released the following day. Created by YouMeUs MNL and directed by Kerbs Balagtas, it depicts the Bini members in a skate park in Valenzuela, Metro Manila, performing hip dance moves and imitating the game "Shagidi Shagidi Shapopo."

== Accolades ==
Award	Year	Category	Result	Ref.
Awit Awards	2026	Best Performance by a Group	Nominated	
Awit Awards	2026	Best Global Collaboration Recording	Nominated	
VP Choice Awards	2026	Viral TikTok Video of the Year	Nominated	

== Credits and personnel ==
Credits are adapted by Apple Music.

- Bini – vocals
- Angela Ken Rojas – songwriter
- Anna Achoso-Graham – songwriter
- Chris "Moophs" Lopez – recording engineer
- Courtlin Jabrae Edwards – songwriter
- Dan Naim – mixing engineer
- Greg Shilling – vocal producer
- Jbach – songwriter
- Leather Jacket – producer
- Leon Zervos – mastering engineer
- Marqueze Parker – songwriter
- Tommy Brown – songwriter, producer

== Charts ==
=== Weekly charts ===
Chart performance for "Shagidi"
Chart (2025)	Peak position
UK Singles Downloads (OCC)	73
UK Singles Sales (OCC)	76

=== Monthly charts ===
Monthly peak chart positions for "Shagidi"
Chart (2025)	Peak position
Philippines Top P-pop Songs (Billboard Philippines)	10
