= Biniverse (tour) =

2024 concert tour by Bini

- Tour by Bini
- Promotional poster for the New Frontier Theater concert
- Start date: June 28, 2024
- End date: November 19, 2024
- No. of shows: 8 in Asia; 4 in North America; 12 in total

Bini concert chronology
- Biniverse (2024); Biniverse World Tour 2025 (2025)

Biniverse is the first concert tour by the Filipino girl group Bini. The tour began in June 2024, at the New Frontier Theater in Quezon City, Philippines. Following the initial concert shows, Bini held a regional tour across the Philippines in July, followed by an overseas tour in Canada in August. A performance at the Araneta Coliseum was held in November. The tour was followed by the Biniverse World Tour 2025, which began at the Philippine Arena by February 2025 followed with stops in Singapore, Dubai, London, and the United States.

== Background ==
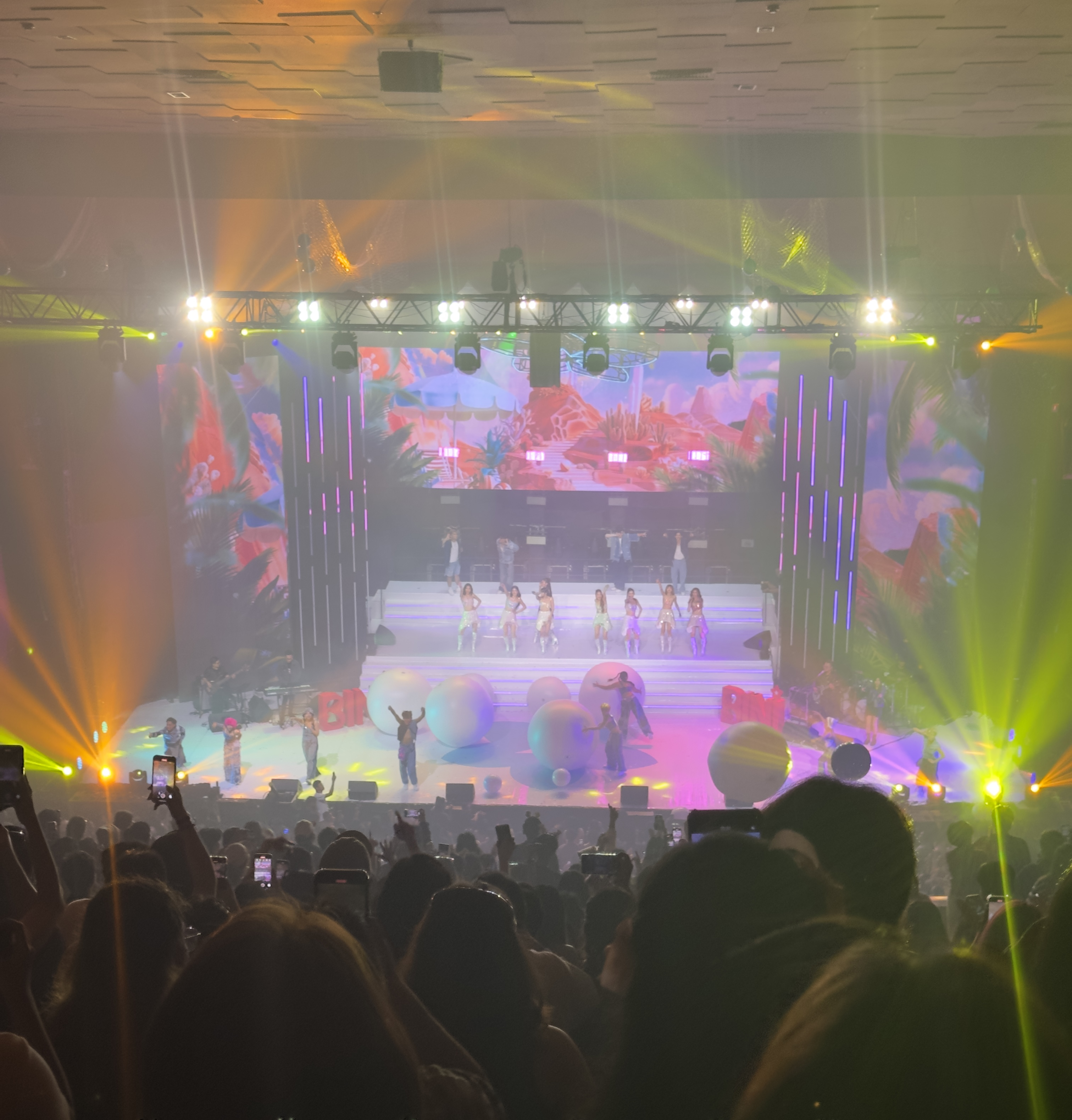
Bini performing their last song "Pantropiko" inside New Frontier Theater in Quezon City. The venue hosted their first three-day sold out shows.

On March 6, 2024, during their press conference for their debut extended play, Talaarawan, Bini announced their first solo concert titled "Biniverse", to be held at the New Frontier Theater. Tickets went on sale on April 2 and sold out in less than two hours. As a result, fans asked for a second concert or a bigger venue, specifically the neighboring Araneta Coliseum. This led to the #WeWantBINIverseInAraneta hashtag becoming a trend on X. Due to public demand, Star Music announced a second concert on April 4, with a third being announced later on April 8. Ticket sales for the additional dates went live on April 9, which also sold out in less than two hours.

On June 12, Star Music announced that the concert would make regional stops in July: on July 6 at the Camp John Hay Trade and Cultural Center in Baguio, on July 14 at the Waterfront Hotel in Cebu City, and on July 20 at the open grounds of the KCC Mall in General Santos.

== Performances ==
=== New Frontier Theater ===
Bini started the concert with a medley of "Na Na Na", "Lagi", and "I Feel Good" lasting 17 minutes. Each member had their solo performances. Mikha and Stacey were the first to perform their solo acts. Mikha began her performance by playing a short snippet of Demon Slayer's opening theme song "Gurenge" on the electric guitar. She then sang Paramore's "That's What You Get" while playing the guitar before transitioning to Dua Lipa's "Don't Start Now". Stacey performed "Thank U, Next" by Ariana Grande. Then Aiah, Maloi, and Sheena presented their performances; Aiah performed Doja Cat's "Woman", with the rap part performed in Cebuano. Maloi combined her love of painting with a performance of Up Dharma Down's "Oo". Sheena showed her skills as the group's main dancer with a routine to Rihanna's "Pour It Up". The final solo performances were played by Gwen, Colet, and Jhoanna. Colet performed Beyoncé's "Crazy in Love", which got a particularly enthusiastic response on Day 1. Gwen did a chair dance to Little Mix's "Woman Like Me". Jhoanna concluded the solo acts by performing Sarah Geronimo's "Isa Pang Araw", accompanied by a string quartet. Bini's concert featured multiple wardrobe changes and interactive elements.

Balloons were dropped primarily in the SVIP/VIP area during "Huwag Muna Tayong Umuwi", with Maloi prompting fans to pop them, revealing handwritten notes. "Pantropiko" featured large beach balls tossed into the audience, creating a festive atmosphere.

The performance of "8", from their debut album Born to Win, included fan-held signs expressing support. They also performed a subdued version of "Born to Win" and an acoustic rendition of "Strings" from their Feel Good album.

The highlight of the first night of the three-night event was the advance performance of their new single, "Cherry on Top", before its official release on July 11. The single was well-received by the sold-out audience at the New Frontier Theater. Additionally, Bini presented a brief teaser of the "Cherry on Top" music video following their performance. The concert concluded with "Da Coconut Nut", the group's pre-debut song, and "Pantropiko", the song that significantly contributed to their rise to fame.

=== Nationwide tour ===
On July 5, the first leg of the Biniverse nationwide tour was held in Baguio, followed by the second leg in Cebu City on July 14, during which Colet added a rendition of Budots to her solo performance. The third and final leg of the nationwide tour was held in General Santos on July 20.

=== North American tour ===
On May 30, Star Music announced that the Biniverse concert will extend to Canada and the United States. The Canadian leg of the tour began in Vancouver on August 9, and was followed by Edmonton on August 10, Winnipeg on August 16, and Toronto on August 17. The dates for the USA leg are yet to be announced. On July 23, Tala Entertainment, the manager of the Toronto concert, announced the transfer of the venue to the Tribute Communities Centre in Oshawa. The decision was made to accommodate more fans clamoring to watch the show.

Unlike the domestic performances, there were no solo performances by the group's members in Canada. Instead, a sub-unit system was made, with Stacey and Mikha performing a rendition of "Snooze" by SZA, Jhoanna, Gwen, and Colet collectively singing "On the Wings of Love" by Jeffrey Osborne, and Maloi, Aiah, and Sheena collectively performing "Please Please Please" by Sabrina Carpenter.

=== Araneta Coliseum ===
At the end of the last day of the New Frontier concert on June 30, 2024, Bini announced that they would have "The Grand Biniverse" concert on October 4 at the Araneta Coliseum. Laurenti Dyogi, ABS-CBN's Head of Entertainment Production, said that the concert in Araneta is "something to look forward to", adding that it would be a different show from the previous Biniverse concerts. On July 26, Star Magic announced that the concert would be moved to November 16 and 17 following concerns by fans over the group's schedules and health, which resulted in the hashtag #PostponeGrandBiniverse becoming viral on social media. Tickets for the concert were made available to members of Bini's official website on August 30, 2024. Due to high demand, all tickets were sold out in less than three hours, leading to the cancellation of the planned general public sale initially scheduled for August 31. However, a third day for the concert for November 18 was subsequently announced on August 31 due to public demand, with tickets sold out within two hours of their release on September 1.

On October 25, 2024, Bini announced that ₱1 million (US$20,304.57) from the concert's ticket sales would be donated to ABS-CBN Foundation's Sagip Kapamilya program to support relief efforts for the victims of Severe Tropical Storm Kristine (Trami).

On November 7, 2024, Bini announced the guest performers for their concert, which include Regine Velasquez, Vice Ganda, Gary Valenciano, Maymay Entrata, drag queens Precious Paula Nicole, Maxie Andreison, Eva Le Queen, Viñas DeLuxe, Popstar Bench, M1ss Jade So, Angel Galang, and Hana Beshie and the dance crew TPM. In addition, instead of relying on electronic and synthetic music for intermissions, the concert's musical director, Rey Cantong, said that the concert will utilize live orchestral performed by Orchestra of the Filipino Youth (OFY). On November 15, 2024, Star Music announced the rescheduling of the second day of the concert from November 17 to November 19, citing safety concerns due to the anticipated impact of Super Typhoon Pepito (Man-yi). They also stated that a portion of the concert's proceeds would be donated to the ABS-CBN Foundation to support relief efforts for those affected by the typhoon.

Bini began their first-day concert with "Pantropiko", followed by performances of "No Fear", "I Feel Good", "Lagi", and "Ang Huling Cha Cha". Jhoanna and Maloi then took the stage as a duo to perform "Greedy" by Tate McRae and "When I Grow Up" by The Pussycat Dolls. This was followed by a group performance of "Strings". Guest performer Maymay Entrata then performed her songs "Puede Ba" and "Amakabogera". Afterward, Aiah and Stacey showcased DJ mixing skills before performing "Lose My Breath" by Destiny's Child, while Mikha and Gwen included stunts in their duo act. Bini's performance continued with "Diyan Ka Lang", featuring Gary Valenciano, with whom they also performed "Di Bale Na Lang". The group incorporated Filipino Sign Language (FSL) during their performance of "Kapit Lang" to promote inclusivity. They were joined by Regine Velasquez for a rendition of "Na Na Nandito Lang". Colet and Sheena concluded the duo acts with songs by Michael Jackson. The group continued with "Karera", parading around the venue, and later performed with guest drag queens, incorporating tossing stunts. Approaching the concert's finale, they celebrated the Christmas season with "Star ng Pasko", a holiday version of "Cherry on Top", and their rendition of "Joy to the World". They then performed "Huwag Muna Tayong Umuwi", changing costumes mid-performance, followed by "Salamin, Salamin". Bini concluded the concert with a final performance of "Na Na Na". Throughout the concert, the group's members travelled across the venue using carts and elevated rigs.

=== Succeeding concerts ===
At the end of the third day of the Grand Biniverse concert in Araneta Coliseum, Bini revealed that the Grand Biniverse will return in 2025, titled "Grand Biniverse: The Valentine Repeat", which is set to take place on February 15, 2025, at the Philippine Arena in Bulacan. This will make the group the first Philippine act to headline a solo concert at the arena. In addition, the group revealed that they will have an upcoming track titled "Blink Twice", which was released in 2025.

In December 2024, ABS-CBN Entertainment announced that the Philippine Arena concert was the first leg of a planned "Biniverse World Tour 2025", with other stops scheduled in Singapore, Dubai, London, and the United States.

== Set list ==
The following set list is from the shows in New Frontier Theater, Quezon City on June 28, 29, and 30, 2024. This may differ from the set lists for the entire tour.

=== New Frontier Theater ===
1. "Na Na Na"
2. "Lagi"
3. "I Feel Good"
4. "Ang Huling Cha Cha"
5. "Karera"
6. "That's What You Get" / "Don't Start Now" (Solo cover performance by Mikha)
7. "Thank U, Next" (Solo cover performance by Stacey)
8. "Diyan Ka Lang"
9. "Na Na Nandito Lang"
10. "8"
11. "Woman" (Solo cover performance by Aiah)
12. "Oo" (Solo cover performance by Maloi)
13. "Pour It Up" / "Woo" (Solo dance performance by Sheena)
14. "Born To Win"
15. "Strings"
16. "Here With You"
17. "Crazy in Love" (Solo cover performance by Colet)
18. "Woman Like Me" (Solo cover performance by Gwen)
19. "Isa Pang Araw" (Solo cover performance by Jhoanna)
20. "Cherry on Top"
21. "Salamin, Salamin"
22. "Huwag Muna Tayong Umuwi"
23. "Da Coconut Nut"
24. "Pantropiko"

=== Grand Biniverse ===
The following set list is from the shows in Araneta Coliseum, Quezon City on November 16, 18, and 19, 2024.

1. "Pantropiko"
2. "No Fear"
3. "I Feel Good"
4. "Lagi"
5. "Ang Huling Cha Cha"
6. "Greedy" / "When I Grow Up" (Duo cover performance by Maloi and Jhoanna)
7. "Strings"
8. "Born To Win"
9. "Puede Ba" / "Amakabogera" (Group cover performance with special guest Maymay Entrata)
10. "Lose My Breath" (Duo cover performance by Stacey and Aiah)
11. "My Oh My"/ "Bad" (Duo cover performance by Mikha and Gwen)
12. "Kapit Lang"
13. "Na Na Nandito Lang" (Group performance with special guest Regine Velasquez) (Note: Regine Velasquez joined Bini for November 16 and 18, 2024 performance only)
14. "Billie Jean" / "Smooth Criminal" (Duo cover performance by Colet and Sheena)
15. "Karera"
16. "B HU U R" (Group cover performance with Vice Ganda and drag queens Eva Le Queen, Hana Beshie, Maxie, Angel, Precious Paula Nicole, Viñas DeLuxe and Popstar Bench) (Note: Vice Ganda joined on this part of the performance for November 18 and 19, 2024)
17. "Star ng Pasko"
18. "Cherry on Top"
19. "Joy To The World"
20. "Huwag Muna Tayong Umuwi"
21. "Salamin, Salamin"
22. "Na Na Na"

== Tour dates ==
List of concert dates
Date (2024)	City	Country	Venue	Ref.
June 28	Quezon City	Philippines	New Frontier Theater	
June 29	Quezon City	Philippines	New Frontier Theater	
June 30	Quezon City	Philippines	New Frontier Theater	
July 6	Baguio	Philippines	Camp John Hay Trade and Cultural Center	
July 14	Cebu City	Philippines	Waterfront Hotel and Casino	
July 20	General Santos	Philippines	KCC Gensan Open Grounds	
August 9	Vancouver	Canada	The Centre in Vancouver for Performing Arts	
August 10	Edmonton	Canada	Edmonton Expo Centre	
August 16	Winnipeg	Canada	Centennial Concert Hall	
August 17	Oshawa (Note: Promoted as Toronto)	Canada	Tribute Communities Centre	
November 16	Quezon City	Philippines	Araneta Coliseum	
November 18	Quezon City	Philippines	Araneta Coliseum	
November 19 (Note: Originally scheduled for November 17, but moved due to concerns regarding Super Typhoon Pepito (Man-yi))	Quezon City	Philippines	Araneta Coliseum	

== Reception ==
The concert received positive reviews from both fans and critics, who praised the group's performance and stage presence. On the last day of the first concert series, the team of New Frontier Theater gave Bini a Plaque of Recognition award for making history in the theater as the first Filipino girl group to hold three consecutive sold-out shows. At the end of the Grand Biniverse, the Araneta Group awarded Bini with a plaque of recognition and the Golden Dome Award for becoming the first Filipino girl group to hold three consecutive sold-out shows in the Araneta Coliseum.

== Streaming ==
On June 18, online streaming platform iWantTFC announced that the third day of the New Frontier Theater concert will be streamed on their platform. This decision was made to accommodate the high demand and to reach Bini's international fanbase. On October 4, Star Music announced that the Grand Biniverse concert would also be streamed on iWantTFC.

A documentary film on the preparations leading to the New Frontier Theater concerts, titled Bini Chapter 1: Born To Win, was released on iWantTFC on September 26 as part of a trilogy series about the group. A sequel, titled Here With You, was released on November 8, 2024, and covered the regional leg of the Biniverse tour. The final part of the trilogy, titled Hanggang Dulo (Until the End), was released on June 12, 2025 and covered the Biniverse concerts in the United States, Canada and the Araneta Coliseum.

== Accolades ==
Awards and nominations received by Bini
Award	Year	Category	Nominated work	Result	Ref.
Aliw Awards	2024	Best Collaboration in a Concert	Biniverse	Nominated	
Box Office Entertainment Awards	2025	Concert of the Year	Grand Biniverse	Won	
New Hue Video Music Awards	2025	Concert of the Year	Grand Biniverse	Won	
P-pop Awards	2024	Concert of the Year	Grand Biniverse	Won	
VP Choice Awards	2026	Group Performer of the Year	Biniverse	Pending	
