= Cherry on Top (Bini song) =

Single by Bini

from the EP Biniverse
- Released: July 11, 2024
- Genre: Bubblegum pop; UK garage; drum n' bass
- Length: 2:55
- Label: Star
- Songwriters: Boy Matthews; Gaby Ramirez; Shintaro Yasuda; Skylar Mones
- Producers: Shintaro Yasuda; Skylar Mones

Bini singles chronology
"Salamin, Salamin" (2024)	"Cherry on Top" (2024)	"Joy to the World" (2024)

"Cherry on Top (Binimo Remix)"

Agnez Mo singles chronology
"Party in Bali (PIB)" (2024)	"Cherry on Top (Binimo Remix)" (2024)

Music video
- "Cherry on Top" on YouTube

"Cherry on Top" is a song by the Filipino girl group Bini. It was released on July 11, 2024, as the lead single from their second extended play, Biniverse, through Star Music. "Cherry on Top" is a bubblegum pop, UK garage, and drum n' bass track. Lyrically, the song is about a woman embracing her attractive qualities and asserting herself to her suitors. It was written by Boy Matthews and Gaby Ramirez, along with producers Shintaro Yasuda and Skylar Mones. Bini members Colet and Maloi also contributed to the songwriting and vocal arrangement. (Note: Although Colet and Maloi are not formally listed on the song's credits, their contributions have been noted by producer Shintaro Yasuda during an interview with Billboard Philippines.)

"Cherry on Top" received favorable reviews from critics, although a few reviews have acknowledged that its sound has divided Bini's fans. It has also appeared in several listicles, such as "Best Songs of July 2024" by Teen Vogue and "25 Best Bini Songs (So Far), Ranked" by Rolling Stone Philippines, among others. "Cherry on Top" entered Billboard Philippines' charts two weeks after its release, peaking at number six on the Philippines Hot 100 and number four on the Top Philippine Songs chart. The accompanying music video was directed by Kerbs Balagtas and depicts the Bini members in Y2K-inspired outfits, walking and dancing in colorful sets. It has earned praise for its visuals, as well as its references to Filipino culture. It became the top-trending music video on YouTube Philippines, reaching two million views within 24 hours of its release, and was reportedly the second-highest-trending music video on the platform in 2024.

== Background ==
The Filipino girl group Bini released the single "Pantropiko" (lit. 'Tropical') on November 17, 2023, to promote their extended play (EP) Talaarawan (lit. 'Diary'), to be released in 2024. Regarded as a sleeper hit, the track gained viral traction the next year as a "summer anthem". The subsequent commercial success of Talaarawan and its third single, "Salamin, Salamin" (lit. 'Mirror, Mirror'), both released on March 8, 2024, helped Bini become the Filipino group with the most monthly listeners on Spotify. "Pantropiko" and "Salamin, Salamin" both peaked at number one on Billboard's Philippines Songs chart on April 27 and June 8, 2024, respectively. On June 16, Bini ended Taylor Swift's two-year run as the number one artist on Spotify Philippines' Daily Top Artists chart, replacing her in the top spot. On June 26, they held their first tour Biniverse.

Following the promotion of Talaarawan, Bini announced the release of the single "Cherry on Top" on June 10, 2024. Elijah Pareño of Rolling Stone Philippines described "Cherry on Top" as "one of the most unexpected turns" that Bini has taken musically, as it incorporates drum n' bass.

== Composition and lyrics ==
"Cherry on Top"
A 13-second sample of "Cherry on Top", where the chorus can be heard.

"Cherry on Top" is two minutes and fifty-five seconds long. It is a bubblegum pop and UK garage song with lyrics written in English. The song was written by Boy Matthews, Gaby Ramirez, Shintaro Yasuda, and Skylar Mones, and produced by Yasuda and Mones. It was developed during a 2023 songwriting camp. In an interview with Billboard Philippines' Gabriel Saulog, Yasuda said that Bini's Colet and Maloi wrote the song with the team and helped them assign parts to the girl group's members. Chris Lopez recorded the song, with mixing by Dan Naim and mastering by Leon Zervos.

Lyrically, the song is from the perspective of a woman who establishes herself as the titular "cherry on top," a sweet addition to her romantic partner's life. Apart from the romantic themes, female empowerment themes have been identified in the lyrics as well. One of Mikha's lines in the song, "'Cause you know who run the world", is a reference to the song "Run the World (Girls)" by Beyoncé. Throughout the song, the hook "I'm the cherry on top" is repeated.

== Promotion and release ==
Bini first teased "Cherry on Top" on June 10, 2024, through their social media platforms. The promotion also included a photo shoot clip with the caption, "All eyes on us! Our upcoming single 'Cherry on Top' is serving soon!" Another teaser was released on Instagram. On July 1, a 60-second sneak peek of the song was made available on the mobile rhythm game Superstar Philippines.

"Cherry on Top" was released by Star Music on July 11, 2024, through digital download and streaming formats. It was included to be part of a then-upcoming album. Shortly after the release of their official lightstick, the group unveiled official "Cherry on Top" shirt merchandise on October 27. The collection comprised a variety of T-shirts adorned with a cherry design, Bini's logotype, and images of the members from the "Cherry on Top" promotional photo shoots. The group also offered a limited bundle that came with an exclusive "Cherry on Top" sticker pack.

A few remixes of the song were released in late 2024. The "BiniMo" remix, featuring vocals from Indonesian singer Agnez Mo, was released on October 3. The collaboration emerged after the group met her at the Enterprise Studios in Los Angeles, as well as Billboard Korea's K Power 100 launch event in Seoul. It replaces Mikha's original English rap with a Tagalog verse, which she co-wrote with the group's vocal coach, Anna Achacoso-Graham. On November 16, a Christmas remix of "Cherry on Top" was released, featuring a brief interpolation of "Jingle Bells". At the start of the Biniverse World Tour 2025 on February 15, 2025, it was announced that "Cherry on Top" and the BiniMo remix were part of an upcoming extended play (EP) titled Biniverse. The EP was released on February 27.

== Reception ==
=== Critical reception ===
Writing for Billboard Philippines, Gabriel Saulog hailed the track as a "sweet auditory sensation" that highlights Bini's "endless charm and flirtatious energy". In the Philippine Daily Inquirer's Pop! section, Geiron Jeff Ocampo provided a mixed opinion. He wrote that the song's musical direction diverged from Bini's typical style, alienating their fan base upon release. He further noted that "Cherry on Top" was potentially either a "mistake" or a "necessary change" for the group. In an article from November 2025, &Asian's Julienne Loreto and Maddie Armstrong praised the song's "frantic" pace and strong melodies, as well as the Bini members' involvement in the songwriting and production. They opined that the track stands out among similar songs even though the sound—a "lighter" version of drum n' bass, as popularized by musical acts such as the K-pop group NewJeans— is oversaturated. In an article from April 2026, Rolling Stone Philippines's Elijah Pareño acknowledged that the track is polarizing for fans, but praised its "bright" and "colorful" production nonetheless.

The song has appeared in some listicles. American magazine Teen Vogue included "Cherry on Top" in their "Best Songs of July 2024" list, with writers Sara Delgado and Kaitlyn McNab calling the song a "pastel-imbued bop" that fulfills listeners' desire for a "summer banger". In November, The Philippine Daily Inquirer's Jewyz Ann Bunyi also included it in an article titled "12 bubblegum pop songs to jive to this holiday season", describing the track as the "cherry on top" of the list itself. In July 2025, the British publication &Asian named it as an honorable mention in their "25 Best P-pop Songs of the 21st Century: So Far" article. In a November ranking of Bini's entire discography, &Asian ranked it 2nd; in an April 2026 ranking of Bini's 25 "greatest" songs so far, Rolling Stone Philippines ranked it 12th.

=== Commercial performance ===
Less than 24 hours since its release, the song garnered one million streams on iTunes and Spotify. The song made a top-ten debut on Billboard Philippines charts two weeks after its release, placing eighth on the Philippines Hot 100 and fifth on Top Philippine Songs. It peaked, respectively, at number six and number four on the same charts. In March 2025, the track re-entered the Top Philippine Songs chart at number 23.

== Music video ==
Bini uploaded the official teaser for the "Cherry on Top" music video on July 1, 2024. The official music video premiered on July 11, alongside the song's release. Set in a fictional place called "Cherry Town", it shows the Bini members wearing Y2K-inspired outfits in shades of pink and red as they walk down a busy "dollhouse-like" street. Some of the dance scenes take place on top of a giant cake, while others are set against a graffiti wall displaying the song's title. The video was directed by Kerbs Balagtas and produced by Roxy Liquigan, Carlo L. Katigbak, and Carlos Jorge Reyes, with choreography by Jonathan Sison and set design by Obron Propmaster and Robert Jose. The members were styled by JM Gumatay, with makeup by Jess Olivarez and hair by Bhads Castor. It was filmed at the PonteFino Residences in Batangas City, showcasing the private neighborhood's vintage, neo-Victorian architectural style. Its sets have been described as a "wonderland of pastels and bright hues".

Publications such as the Philippine Daily Inquirer's American bureau and SunStar Cebu have praised how the video portrays of Filipino culture. These cultural references include pagmamano, (Note: pagmamano is a traditional Filipino gesture of respect and honor in Filipino culture.) balikbayan boxes, (Note: lit. 'repatriate box' is a corrugated box sent by an overseas Filipino or Overseas Filipino Worker (OFW) to their families in the Philippines.) and Filipino snacks such as banana cue (Note: A Filipino snack consisting of deep-fried, caramelized bananas skewered on sticks, made using saba bananas.) and halo-halo. (Note: lit. 'mix-mix' is a Filipino dessert made with mixed sweetened ingredients, crushed ice, milk, and toppings of ube, leche flan, and ice cream.) The video also depicts a typical morning scene in the Philippines, featuring items such as walis tingting (transl. hard broom) and pandesal (Note: lit. 'salt bread' is a soft, Filipino bread roll.) dipped in coffee. SunStar's Jewil Anne M. Tabiolo wrote that these cultural references helped the video maintain a distinct "Filipino flair" despite the song's English lyrics, a sentiment echoed by Hans Carbonilla of the Inquirer.

Following its release on July 11, the video became the top trending music video on YouTube. It amassed over two million views on the platform within fewer than 24 hours of its release. In September, Bini published a dance practice video for the song. In December, "Cherry on Top" was recognized as the second-highest trending music video of 2024 on YouTube Philippines. It has been nominated for Music Video of the Year by several award-giving bodies: the P-pop Music Awards, the New Hue Video Music Awards, the Myx Music Awards, the Platinum Stallion National Media Awards, the Jupiter Music Awards, and the Awit Awards. The video won in its nominated category at the 10th Platinum Stallion Awards ceremony, as well as the International Music Video title at the 2024 BreakTudo Awards in Brazil.

== Other uses ==
=== Live performances ===
Prior to the song's official release, Bini performed "Cherry on Top" at their first solo concert, Biniverse, which ran for three nights from June 28 to 30, 2024 at the New Frontier Theater in Quezon City. On July 27, they performed the track at the KCON music festival in Los Angeles. They were the first P-pop act to appear on the KCON stage. According to the Filipino news site Rappler, Bini's performance provided an opportunity for the overall P-pop industry to attain global recognition. On August 27, they performed a medley of "Cherry on Top" and "Pantropiko" (lit. 'Tropical') at the Hotel Shilla in Seoul for the Billboard K Power 100 ceremony, where they received the Voices of Asia award. On October 15, Bini performed the song, along with "Pantropiko", at Billboard Philippines' Mainstage anniversary show, held at the SM Mall of Asia Arena. Due to a technical issue, the instrumentals suddenly stopped in the middle of "Cherry on Top". Following a moment of confusion, the Bini members sang the track a capella.

In April 2026, they performed the remix of "Cherry on Top" during their debut performance at Coachella 2026.

=== In popular culture ===
At KCON 2024, Los Angeles-based girl group Katseye danced to "Cherry on Top". Nylon Manila's Nica Glorioso deemed it as evidence of Bini's growing international success. On August 7, 2024, the K-pop girl group Unis performed a dance cover of the song. On November 10, the Los Angeles Clippers dance team, Clippers Spirit, performed "Cherry on Top" during the halftime show of the NBA game between the Toronto Raptors and LA Clippers. As a part of Globe Telecom's G Fest, which took place from September 22 to November 16, the group's dance coaches Mickey Perz, Reden Blanquera, and Matthew Almodovar taught the "Cherry on Top" choreography in workshops.

== Awards and nominations ==
Name of award ceremony, year, category, and result
Award	Year	Category	Result	Ref.
Awit Awards	2025	Music Video of the Year	Nominated	
Awit Awards	2026	Best Global Collaboration Recording	Nominated	
BreakTudo Awards	2024	International Music Video	Won	
Jupiter Music Awards	2025	Song of the Year	Nominated	
Jupiter Music Awards	2025	Collaboration of the Year	Nominated	
Jupiter Music Awards	2025	Music Video of the Year	Nominated	
Myx Music Awards	2024	Music Video of the Year	Nominated	
New Hue Video Music Awards	2025	Music Video of the Year	Nominated	
P-pop Music Awards	2024	Music Video of the Year	Nominated	
Platinum Stallion National Media Awards	2025	Music Video of the Year	Won	

== Listicles ==
Name of publisher, year listed, name of listicle, and placement
Publisher	Year	Listicle	Placement	Ref.
&Asian	2025	The 25 Best P-pop Songs of the 21st Century: So Far	Honorable mention	
&Asian	2025	Ranking Every Bini Song So Far	2nd	
Philippine Daily Inquirer	2024	12 Bubblegum Pop Songs to Jive to this Holiday Season	Placed	
Rolling Stone Philippines	2024	Filipino Music Videos that Stole the Spotlight in 2024	Placed	
Rolling Stone Philippines	2026	25 Best Bini Songs (So Far), Ranked	12th	
Teen Vogue	2024	Best Songs of July 2024	Placed	

== Credits and personnel ==
Credits are adapted from Apple Music, and Tidal, unless otherwise indicated.

- Bini - lead vocals
- ABS-CBN Film Productions, Inc. – music publisher
- Anna Achacoso-Graham - vocal arranger
- Bee & Rose Music – music publisher
- Boy Matthews - songwriter
- Champagne Therapy – music publisher
- Chris Lopez - recording engineer
- Colet Vergara - songwriter, vocal arranger
- Concord Music Publishing – music publisher
- Dan Naim - mixing engineer
- Exc Music – music publisher
- Gaby Ramirez - songwriter
- Greg Shilling - vocal producer
- James Norton Pub Designee – music publisher
- Leon Zervos - mastering engineer
- Maloi Ricalde - songwriter, vocal arranger
- Shintaro Yasuda - songwriter, producer
- Skylar Mones - songwriter, producer
- These are Songs for Pulse – music publisher
- Universal Music Group – music publisher
- UMPG – music publisher
- WC Music Corp. – music publisher
- Waxie G. Joaquin – surround mixing engineer

== Charts ==
=== Weekly charts ===
Chart (2024)	Peak position
Philippines Hot 100 (Billboard Philippines)	6
Philippines Top Songs (Billboard Philippines)	4

=== Year-end charts ===
Chart (2024)	Position
Philippines Hot 100 (Billboard Philippines)	91
