= Colet (singer) =

Filipino singer and dancer (born 2001)

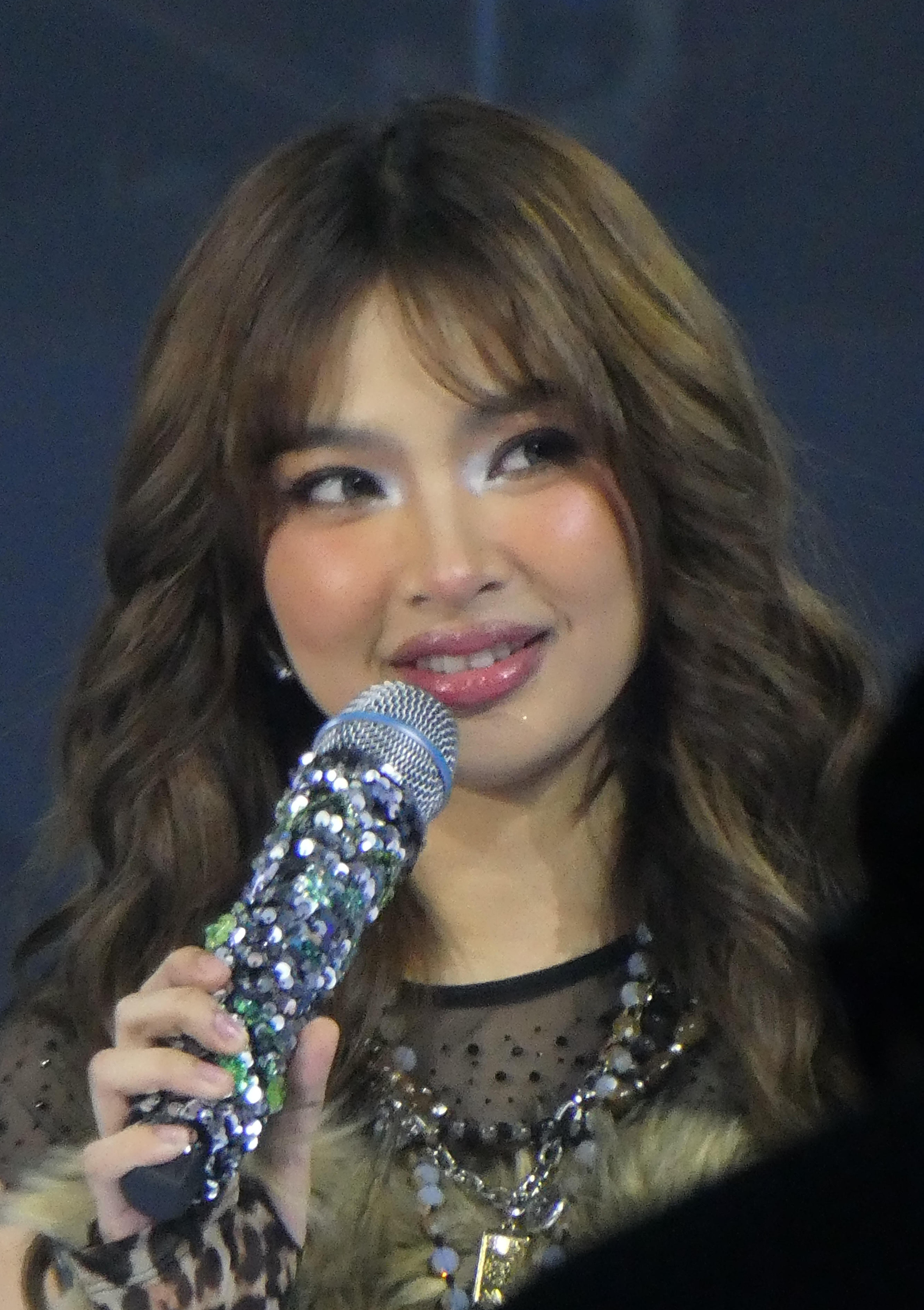
- Colet in 2025
- Born: Ma. Nicolette Florenosos Vergara; September 14, 2001 (age 25); Tagbilaran, Bohol, Philippines
- Occupations: Singer; songwriter; dancer; rapper
- Years active: 2020–present
- Musical career
- Genres: Acoustic music; pop; rock; sentimental ballad
- Instruments: Vocals; guitar; drums
- Label: Star
- Member of: Bini
- Awards: JuanCast (2); P-pop Music Awards (1)

Ma. (Note: pronounced as Maria) Nicolette Florenosos Vergara (born September 14, 2001), known professionally as Colet, is a Filipino singer, songwriter, dancer, and rapper under Star Magic. Before joining the Filipino girl group Bini, Colet was accepted on the singing contest Tawag ng Tanghalan (lit. 'Call of the Stage') but withdrew to focus on her education. Following two years of training in ABS-CBN's Star Hunt Academy (SHA) program, Colet debuted as one of the main vocalists, lead dancers, and lead rappers of Bini in June 2021.

Colet has garnered various songwriting and composition credits. She has also gained critical recognition for her work. On July 1, 2024, the government of her hometown, Tagbilaran, honored her with a Plaque of Recognition for her dedication to music. Colet has also been recognized by various sources for representing Visayans in the mainstream Philippine media. As a P-pop idol, she has also been nominated for several accolades and won a few such as the Golden Voice Award at the JuanCast Midyear Awards and Ace of the Year at the 11th P-pop Music Awards, both in 2026. Colet has been described as "one of the biggest stars in the nation" by Nylon Manila and a "renowned[...] OPM tastemaker" by Billboard Philippines.

== Life and career ==
=== Early life and education ===
Ma. Nicolette Florenosos Vergara was born on September 14, 2001, in Tagbilaran, Bohol, Philippines to Arnulfo and Maria Regina Vergara. Her father was also a singer and drummer. In her younger years, she participated in her school's singing groups and in singing competitions. She also joined her school's dance group and competed in inter-school dance competitions. As a student, she wrote the lyrics to what became the Bini track "8" in 2021, which was initially conceived as a graduation song. She is a survivor of the 2013 Bohol earthquake. In 2024, she completed senior high school at the Japan Philippine Institute of Technology in Bulacan as a scholar.

=== Beginnings ===
In high school, Colet was accepted as a contestant for Tawag ng Tanghalan (lit. 'Call of the Stage'), a televised singing contest. She planned to cover "'Wag Ka Nang Umiyak" (lit. 'Don't Cry Anymore') by KZ Tandingan, but withdrew to focus on her education before she could compete. In 2018, she joined ABS-CBN's Star Hunt Academy (SHA) training program for aspiring P-pop idols. As a trainee, Colet had difficulty interacting with the others due to a language barrier, as Cebuano (Bisaya) is her first language. She has also mentioned that she often declines solo interview requests because she finds it difficult to speak Tagalog. SHA director Lauren Dyogi worried that Colet could not endure the "rigorous" training, as she would sometimes be brought to the clinic due to exhaustion. Colet also had concerns due to the COVID-19 pandemic. In November 2020, Colet officially became a member of the Filipino girl group Bini. In December, it was confirmed that Colet would hold the positions of main vocalist, lead dancer, and lead rapper within Bini.

=== 2021–present: Debut in Bini, career expansion ===
"Lagi"
A 16-second sample of Colet singing the "climactic" third chorus in "Lagi" by Bini, described as the track's "greatest part" by Rolling Stone Philippines. In it, she sustains a belted B_{4} note.

In June 2021, Bini debuted with the single "Born to Win", with Colet as one of the members. She also contributed to the song's vocal arrangement. According to the Filipino online magazine Zeen, she has cultivated a reputation for moving across her roles within the group "without losing what makes her distinctly Colet". Tatler Asia has credited her for molding the group's sound as well. On Erwan Heussaff's Kitchen Conversations program, fellow Bini member Aiah referred to Colet as the group's "back-up vocal coach", next to their official instructor Anna Graham. Her performance in Bini's 2022 single "Lagi" (lit. 'Always') earned praise especially. Rolling Stone Philippines writer Pie Gonzaga called the third chorus sung by Colet "the greatest part" of the track.

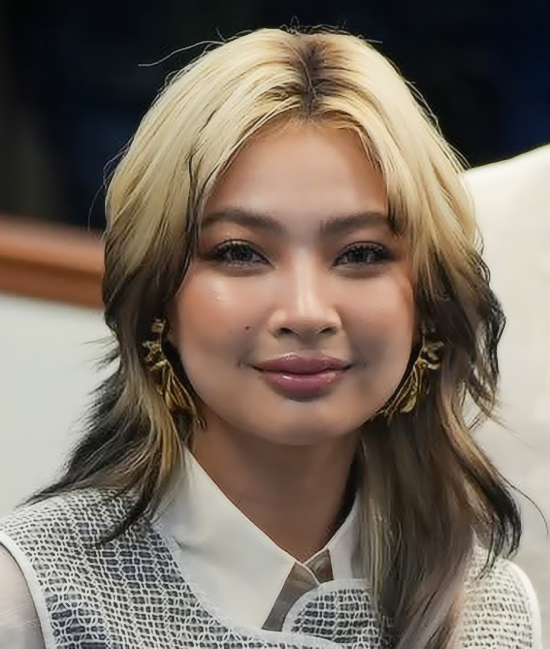
Colet in 2026

Colet covered "When We Were Young" by Adele at Spotify's "Parinig Mo" (lit. 'Let Them Hear') event in 2023. In July 2024, Colet was interviewed by Melai Cantiveros on the talk show Kuan on One, where Colet also performed her unreleased original composition in Cebuano. In December that year, she performed a solo acoustic set at the Café Conchita in Bohol. On February 2, 2025, Colet performed the Visayan pop song "Puhon" (lit. 'Someday') with singer-songwriter TJ Monterde at his Sarili Nating Mundo (lit. 'Our Own World') concert at the Araneta Coliseum in Quezon City. She sang high notes as the screen displayed the song's original Cebuano lyrics, paired with Tagalog subtitles, behind her and Monterde. In September, Colet was one of the guest mentors for the televised children's singing competition Idol Kids Philippines.

In late 2026, Colet entertained tourists at a floating restaurant on Loboc River in her home province. Among other numbers, she covered "A Million Dreams" from The Greatest Showman (2017) and performed tinikling, a traditional Filipino dance of Visayan origin.

== Other ventures ==
=== Business ===
In 2026, Colet co-founded a fashion brand called Colieair (stylized in all lowercase) with some of her friends.

=== Philanthropy ===
In October 2024, Colet participated in Aiah's Aiahdvocacy initiative. Along with fellow Bini member Maloi, they visited a nursing home as a part of the outreach program. In March 2025, Colet collaborated with her fan group for Project Colipay, (Note: Translation notes: a combination of her name, Colet, and the Cebuano word kalipay, meaning happiness) in which she hosted Jollibee parties for children with disabilities. She explained that, having grown up in poverty, she never had the chance to experience a Jollibee birthday party herself as a child. (Note: In the Philippines, the fast food chain Jollibee is a popular venue for children's birthday parties.) In April, she donated goods to children in Bohol through Project Puhon. In May, a fan group also launched a project called Colaiah (Colet and Aiah) Cares, which provided food, hygiene kits, and school supplies to disadvantaged children in Quezon City. Both Colet and Aiah showed their support for the charity initiative. On November 9, she and Aiah distributed relief goods to survivors of Typhoon Kalmaegi (Tino) in Cebu.

On her 25th birthday in 2026, Colet performed pop ballads in an acoustic jam session at Dancing in the Rain, a charity fundraiser organized by her fan group Colet Fan Suporta (lit. 'Colet Fan Support') at the World Trade Exchange building in Binondo, Manila. Her set list included a cover of "Slow Motion" by Karina Pasian and a duet with Arthur Nery, "Palayo Sa Mundo" (lit. 'Away From This World'), originally by Nery and Jolianne.

== Public image ==
Colet is a P-pop idol. In 2024, Nylon Manila's Nica Glorioso described Colet as "one of the biggest stars in the nation". She also commended Colet for amplifying lesser-known Filipino musical artists. Writing for Billboard Philippines, Gabriel Saulog called Colet a "renowned[...] OPM tastemaker".

Ralph Lawrence G. Llemit of the Filipino newspaper SunStar Davao named Colet's endorsement of the Eliza Maturan song "Museo" (lit. 'Museum') as one of the reasons for its entry into the Billboard music charts. In an interview with Billboard Philippines' Mayks Go, Maturan acknowledged that "Museo" suddenly rose to number one on the Spotify Viral Chart shortly after Colet posted about it on X and Instagram. Go partially credited Colet for taking Maturan's career to "greater heights than she could have ever imagined".

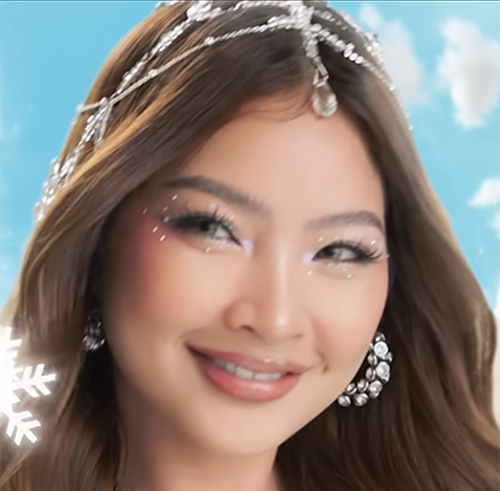
Colet in an advertisement in October 2024

=== Ethnic identity ===
Many fans refer to Colet as "Anger", a reference to the personification of the emotion in the Inside Out films. Jessica Ngojo of Cebu Daily News attributed the nickname to Colet's "angry" skits on her live broadcasts online. However, Colet herself has pushed back against the nickname, repeatedly telling the public that she is not constantly angry. An essay published in the Philippine Daily Inquirer's Young Blood column (Note: an opinion column featuring essays by young Filipino writers below the age of 30) identified the persistence of the Anger nickname as an example of negative ethnic stereotyping towards Visayan people.

In an article analyzing the history of Visayan pop music for the American magazine Positively Filipino, Julienne Loreto credited Colet for increasing the general public's interest in the Cebuano language. Similarly, a research paper published in 2024 recognized her as a celebrity who provided representation for Visayans and Cebuano speakers in the media. Ngojo described Colet as a "beloved icon[...] for Cebuanos, Boholanos, and Visayans alike".

== Artistry ==
=== Musical style ===
Various publications have recognized Colet's musicianship. Dubai-based newspaper Gulf News quoted a fan, Lei Redulla Lopez, who described Colet as "multi-talented". Lopez, who attended Bini's concert in November 2024, praised the singer for her vocal, dance, and rap skills, adding that she knew how to play instruments such as the guitar and drums. Bini's songs are known for being fast and upbeat, but in Colet's solo work, she often performs ballads.

At Bini's Binified concert in 2025, Colet covered "4 Minutes" by Madonna featuring Justin Timberlake in a solo production number, where she also played the drums. Her drum performance was described as "rocking" and "jaw-dropping" by Billboard Philippines' Gabriel Saulog. Likewise, writers from Pulp likened her drumming to a rock star's. In 2026, Zeen said that Colet brings "range" to Bini's generally "bright" pop discography.

=== Vocals ===
"Unang Kilig"
Colet displaying her raw belting vocals in the "Unang Kilig" recording session with Jeremy G

Nica Jose of Philippine Entertainment Portal wrote that singing is the "cornerstone" of Colet's artistry. Zeen's Francesca Bacordo said that Colet brings "powerful" vocals and "high-energy" stage presence to Bini. Rappler's Gelo Gonzales noted that her solo performance was the night's only fully acoustic song during a Bini live show in Alpas, an event venue in La Union, which took place on May 30, 2024. He wrote that Colet's decision to sing a fully acoustic number allowed her voice to speak for itself. In a Positively Filipino article, a British vocal coach named Caroline Parry described Colet as Bini's best technical singer, calling her voice the group's "crown jewel".

Colet is a soprano. Writing for the Filipino online magazine Parcinq, Hans Ethan Carbonilla characterized Colet's singing skills as "heavenly". He added, "Maybe if we had that kind of vocal ability, we wouldn't shut up. But then again, some people like Colet were naturally born to be a star." Parry has named breath control and diaphragm support while singing as two of Colet's notable skills as a vocalist. Jessica Robb, an American vocal coach, further lauded Colet's ability to resonate in her pharynx, which produces "highly refined, robust" high notes. Through the Visayan magazine Kasing2, American vocal coach Karen Lyu praised Colet's singing for being well-supported and called her upper range "effortless".

== Discography ==
List of singles, showing year released and associated albums
Title	Year	Album	Ref.
"Kalma Kahit Magulo" (with Jhoanna Robles and Juan Karlos Labajo)	2024	High Street Original Soundtrack	

=== Songwriting credits ===
List of singles, showing year released and associated albums
Title	Year	Artist	Album	Credits	Ref.
"Born to Win"	2021	Bini	Born to Win	Vocal arranger	
"Golden Arrow"	2021	Bini	Born to Win	Lyricist	
"8"	2021	Bini	Born to Win	Lyricist, composer	
"Kinikilig"	2021	Bini	Born to Win	Lyricist	
"Karera"	2023	Bini	Talaarawan	Lyricist	
"Bata, Kaya Mo"	2023	Bini and Playertwo	Coke Studio Philippines Season 7	Lyricist	
"Cherry on Top"	2024	Bini	Biniverse	Lyricist, vocal arranger	

== Filmography ==
Year	Title	Role	Notes	Ref.
2024	Kuan on One	Herself	Guest	
2024	It's Showtime	Herself	Guest	
2025	Idol Kids Philippines	Herself	Guest mentor	

== Awards and nominations ==
On July 1, 2024, the local government of Tagbilaran awarded Colet with a plaque of recognition for her dedication to music. They credited her musical career for inspiring pride and admiration among the residents of the city. Her parents received the plaque on her behalf, as she was in Manila at the time due to work schedules. In 2025, she won the P-pop Powerful Vocal Female title on JuanCast, The Philippine Star's P-pop platform, and was nominated for P-pop Favorite Vocalist of the Year and The Complete Package: EveryJuan's P-pop All Rounder at the 10th P-pop Music Awards. In July 2026, Colet won the Golden Voice Award at the JuanCast Midyear Awards, an accolade given to a vocalist with "exceptional vocal ability [and] technique". In October, she won Ace of the Year at the 11th P-pop Awards, which recognized her "versatility" across singing, dancing, and performing.

Platform	Year	Category	Recipient	Result	Ref.
JuanCast	2025	EveryJuan's P-pop Powerful Vocal Female	Colet	Won	
JuanCast	2026	Golden Voice Award	Colet	Won	
P-pop Music Awards	2025	P-pop Favorite Vocalist of the Year	Colet	Nominated	
P-pop Music Awards	2025	The Complete Package: EveryJuan's P-pop All Rounder	Colet	Nominated	
P-pop Music Awards	2026	Ace of the Year	Colet	Won	
