= Rolling Stone Philippines =

Philippine edition of the Rolling Stone magazine

- March 21, 2025, cover featuring Eraserheads
- Editor: Jonty Cruz
- Staff writers: Sai Versailles; Christian San Jose; Nimu Mirano; Pie Gonzaga; Elijah Pareño
- Categories: Culture; music; entertainment
- Publisher: Anne Bernisca
- Founded: December 12, 2024; 22 months ago
- First issue: March 21, 2025
- Company: Modern Media Group; Penske Media Corporation
- Country: Philippines
- Based in: Metro Manila
- Language: English
- Website: rollingstonephilippines.com

Rolling Stone Philippines is a Philippine magazine and brand owned and published by Modern Media Group. The company is a sister outlet of Nylon Manila and Billboard Philippines. It is the Philippine version of the Rolling Stone magazine that focuses on music, entertainment, pop culture and politics. The franchise magazine made its official launch on December 12, 2024, at The Peninsula Manila.

== History ==
Rolling Stone Philippines was first announced on June 14, 2024. It will be managed by Modern Media Group Inc., a subsidiary of AGC Power Holdings Corporation, which also a sister companies of Nylon Manila and Billboard Philippines. Chief operating officer Anne Bernisca expressed her views on the launch of Philippine magazine, stating that the magazine aims to uphold its global standards while incorporating new perspectives and highlighting Filipino voices.

On December 12, 2024, it was officially launched the franchise magazine at The Peninsula Manila in Makati City. The event was led by Chief Operating Officer Anne Bernisca, alongside Modern Media Group CEO Archie Carrasco, Rolling Stone Philippines Chief of Editorial Content Jonty Cruz, and Digital Editor Sai Versailles.

== See also ==
- Mega
