= &Asian =

British online magazine

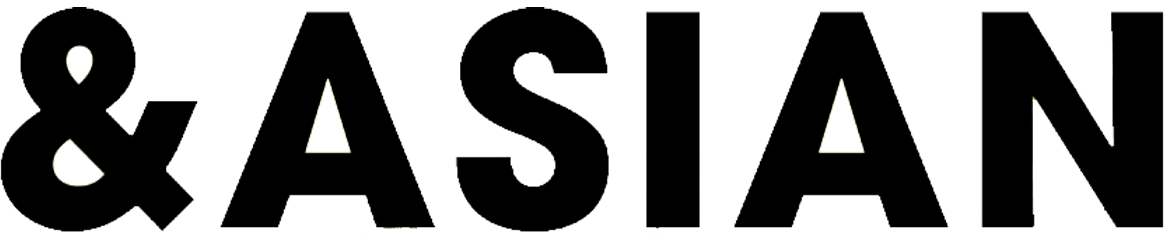
- Editor in Chief: Aimée Kwan; Maddie Armstrong
- Staff writers: Staff writers Andros Resurreccion; Elia Sunriver; Julienne Loreto; Manon Lan; Sonal Lad
- Categories: Asian diaspora, Music, Sports
- Founder: Aimée Kwan
- Founded: August 2021; 5 years ago
- Country: United Kingdom
- Language: English
- Website: andasian.com

&Asian (stylised in all caps; pronounced as Andasian) is an independent online magazine founded in August 2021 by Aimée Kwan in the United Kingdom. The publication featured music reviews, interviews and editorial content which a focus on artists and stories from the Asian diaspora.

== History ==
In August 2021, Aimée Kwan founded &Asian which covers stories relating to the Asian diaspora. The publication reports on work by people of Asian heritage from around the world.

Since 2024, it has expand their coverage to include a limited number of topics and artists beyond the diaspora, selected on the basis of their wider international relevance.
