= Biniverse (EP) =

EP by Bini
- Released: February 27, 2025
- Genres: Pop; R&B-pop; synth-pop; Europop; disco-pop
- Length: 18:38
- Languages: English; Tagalog
- Label: Star
- Producers: Franks; Glitch; Leather Jacket; Michael Schulz; Moophs; Oneye; Shintaro Yasuda; Skylar Mones; Tim Recala

Bini chronology
Talaarawan (2024)	Biniverse (2025)	Flames (2025)

Singles from Biniverse
- 1. "Cherry on Top" Released: July 11, 2024; 2. "Cherry on Top (BiniMo Remix)" Released: October 3, 2024; 3. "Blink Twice" Released: February 13, 2025

Biniverse (2025) (stylized as BINIverse) is the second extended play of Filipino girl group Bini. It was released on February 27, 2025, through Star Music. It consists of six tracks, of which three were released as singles, namely "Cherry on Top" and its remix version, and "Blink Twice". It was produced by Franks, Glitch, Leather Jacket, Michael Schulz, Moophs, Oneye, Shintaro Yasuda, Skylar Mones, and Tim Recala.

== Background ==
On February 15, 2025, during the Grand Biniverse: The Valentine Repeat concert, the first show of the Biniverse World Tour 2025, Bini announced the release of an upcoming EP. A teaser snippet previewed six tracks, including "Cherry on Top", its "BiniMo" remix with Agnez Mo, and "Blink Twice". The singles had previously been released in 2024 and 2025 as promotional tracks for the mini-album. A collaboration with Korean-American singer eaJ was also included in the EP.

== Composition ==
Marking the group's first all-English project, Biniverse has been musically described to be a collection of six tracks spanning several genres including synth-pop, Europop, 90s-inspired R&B, and disco-pop. The EP opens with the single "Blink Twice", which explores newer sounds from R&B-pop and 2000s-inspired pop. "Zero Pressure" continues the record as an 80s-inspired synth-pop anthem centered on themes of ambition and perseverance. The track "Secrets", which houses a collaboration with eaJ, is described as being about trust and vulnerability in relationships, while "Out of My Head" depicts the rush of falling in love. "Cherry on Top", followed by its "BiniMo" remix featuring Agnez Mo, closes the EP as a bubblegum pop song with a UK garage beat.

== Promotion and release ==
Two singles supported the release of Biniverse. The EP's lead single, "Cherry on Top", was released on July 11, 2024. The song peaked at number six on the Philippines Hot 100. The "BiniMo" remix version of the song, which features Indonesian singer Agnez Mo, was released on October 3. "Blink Twice" was released as the EP's next single on February 13, 2025, two weeks before Biniverse's February 27 release date. It peaked at number seven on the Philippines Hot 100. The song also debuted on foreign component charts, including placements at number 24 on New Zealand's RMNZ Hot Singles Chart and number 27 on the United Kingdom's OCC UK Singles Downloads Chart, among others.

=== Concert tour ===
Prior to the release of the EP, Bini held the 2024 Biniverse concert tour. On June 30, 2024, at the end of their three-night show at the New Frontier Theater in Quezon City for the tour, Bini announced that they would hold the Grand Biniverse concert at the Araneta Coliseum in October 2024, which was later followed by the Grand Biniverse: The Valentine Repeat concert on February 15, 2025, at the Philippine Arena. The latter was later revealed to serve as the first show of the Biniverse World Tour 2025, which the Biniverse EP would support. The tour consisted of 16 shows spanning Asia, Europe, and North America throughout 2025.

== Reception ==
Featured on the Grammys' New Music Friday round-up for the last week of February 2025, Biniverse was dubbed as an "infectious soundtrack" that represented Bini's new era.

== In popular culture ==
On September 17, 2025, one of Biniverse's tracks, "Out of my Head", was the final lipsync song in episode six of Drag Race Philippines: Slaysian Royale season one. It's the first Bini song to appear on the Drag Race franchise.

== Track listing ==
Biniverse track listing
No.	Title	Writer(s)	Producer(s)	Length
1.	"Blink Twice"	Steven Franks; Amanda Ratchford; Pontus Kalm; Marqueze Parker; Pacific-Joshua Zagabe; Darius Coleman	Oneye; Leather Jacket; Franks; Glitch	2:33
2.	"Zero Pressure"	Mones; Michel Schulz; Melanie Joy Fontana; Elle Campbell	Mones; Schulz	2:50
3.	"Secrets" (featuring eaJ)	Jayson Franz Pasicolan; James Jonelle Lanate; Norraine Mae Ambida	Tim Recla	3:24
4.	"Out of My Head"	Sabine Cerrado; Lopez	Moophs	3:35
5.	"Cherry on Top"	Boy Matthews; Gaby Ramirez; Shintaro Yasuda; Skylar Mones	Yasuda; Mones	2:55
6.	"Cherry on Top (BiniMo Remix)" (featuring Agnez Mo)	Matthews; Ramirez; Yasuda; Mones	Yasuda; Mones	3:21
Total length:				18:38

Bonus Tracks (CD only)
No.	Title	Length
7.	"Blink Twice (Darren Cashwell Remix)"
8.	"Blink Twice (Dos Veces Remix)" (featuring Belinda)	2:34
9.	"Blink Twice (Taglish Version)"	2:34

== Personnel ==
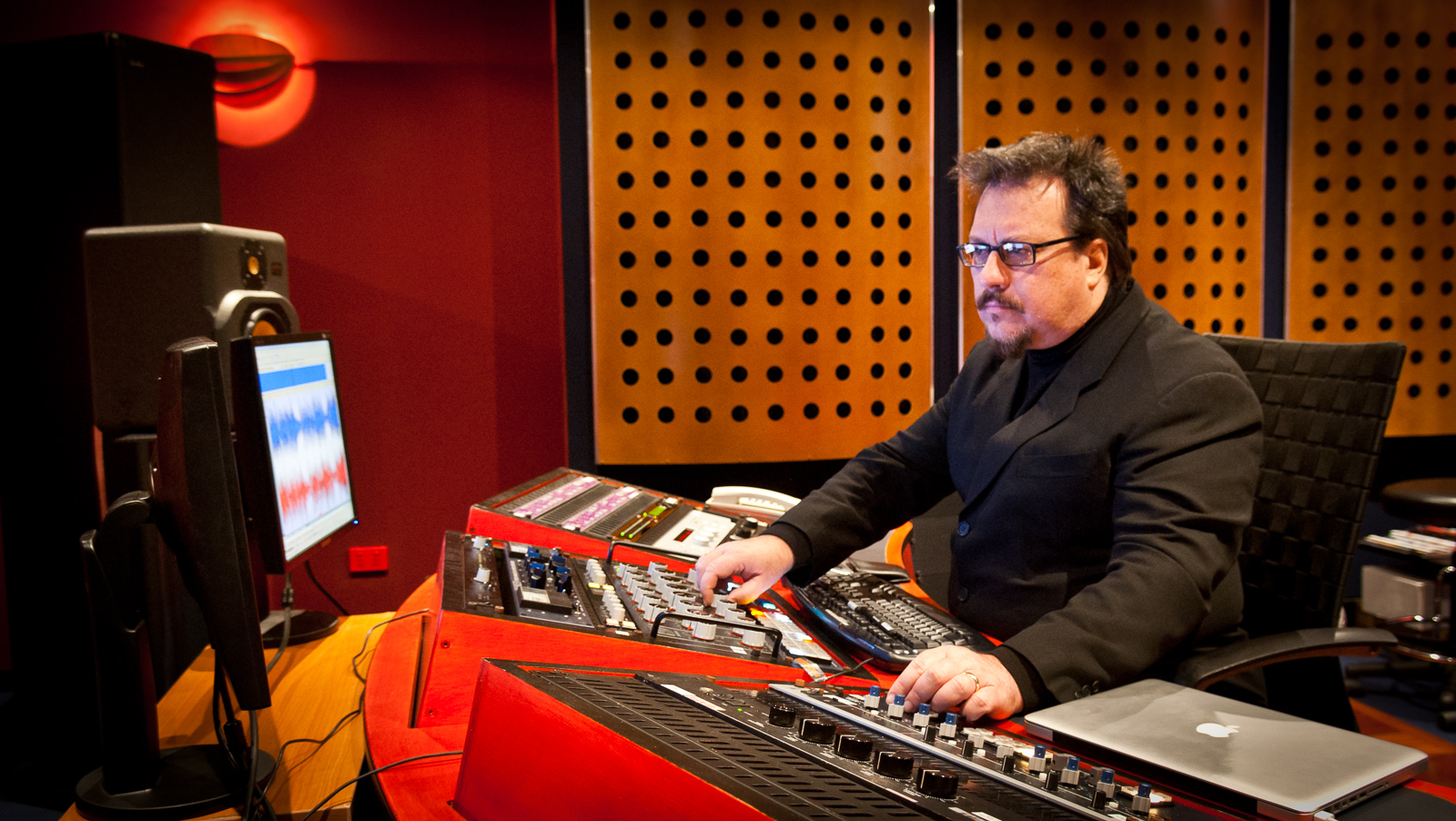
Leon Zervos mastered all of the tracks on Biniverse.

Credits are adapted from Tidal.

- Bini – vocals (all tracks)
- 51000 Feet Music – music publisher (2)
- ABS-CBN Film Productions, Inc. – music publisher (all tracks)
- Almo Music Corp – music publisher (2)
- Anna Achoso-Graham – vocal arranger (1, 2, 5, 6), vocal producer (3, 4)
- Bee & Rose Music – music publisher (5, 6)
- BMG Gold Songs – music publisher (1)
- Champagne Therapy Music Publishing, LLC – music publisher (1)
- Champagne Therapy Music Publishing – music publisher (1)
- Chris "Moophs" Lopez – A&R Administrator (all tracks), recording (2, 4, 5, 6), mixing (4)
- Dan Naim – mixing engineer (1, 2, 5, 6), recording engineer (1)
- Concord Music Publishing – music publisher (5, 6)
- Exc Music – music publisher (5, 6)
- Greg Shilling – vocal producer (1,2, 5, 6)
- Hits on the Range – music publisher (1)
- James Norton Pub Designee – music publisher (5, 6)
- Kobalt Songs Music Publishing – music publisher (2)
- Lily Raye Music – music publisher (1)
- Leon Zervos – mastering engineer (all tracks)
- Moophs Publishing – music publisher (4)
- Raybanman Music – music publisher (1)
- Reservoir Media Management, Inc. – music publisher (1)
- Reservoir Media Music – music publisher (1)
- Rich Travali – surround mixing (1)
- Songs of Universal, Inc. – music publisher (1)
- Sony/ATV Ballad – music publisher (2)
- These are Songs of Pulse – music publisher (2, 5, 6)
- Tim Recla – recording engineer (3)
- Tinkermel Music Creations – music publisher (2)
- Universal Music Corp – music publisher (1, 5)
- Waxie G. Joaquin – surround mixing (2, 3, 4, 5)
- Warner Chappell Scandinavia – music publisher (1, 5)
- Wide Eyed Ent – music publisher (2, 5, 6)

== Charts ==
Chart performance for Biniverse
Chart (2025)	Peak position
UK Album Downloads (Official Charts)	20

== Release history ==
Region	Date	Format	Label	Ref.
Various	February 27, 2025	digital download; streaming	Star Music	
Various	August 1, 2025 (Note: Originally to be released on May 30, 2025, but was delayed.)	CD	Star Music	

== Awards and nominations ==
Award	Year (Note: Indicates the year of the ceremony. Each year is linked to the article about the awards held that year, wherever possible.)	Category	Result	Ref.
Filipino Music Awards	2025	Album of the Year	Nominated	
Jupiter Music Awards	2025	Album of the Year	Nominated	
P-pop Music Awards	2025	Album of the Year	Nominated	
