= New Frontier Theater =

Theater in Quezon City, Metro Manila, Philippines

- The theater in 2017
- Interactive map of New Frontier Theater
- Former names: New Frontier Cinema-Theater and Kia Theatre (2015–2018)
- Address: 7 Gen. Aguinaldo Avenue, Araneta City; Cubao, Quezon City, Metro Manila, Philippines
- Coordinates: 14°37′20″N 121°3′14″E
- Owner: Araneta Group
- Operator: Araneta Group
- Capacity: 2,325
- Public transit: Araneta Center–Cubao; Araneta Center–Cubao; Araneta City Bus Port

Construction
- Opened: May 27, 1967; 59 years ago
- Renovated: 2014–2015
- Reopened: August 15, 2015; 11 years ago
- Years active: 1967–1995, 2015–present

Website
- newfrontiertheater.com

The New Frontier Theater, known as the Kia Theatre between 2015 and 2018, is a multi-purpose theater and events hall in Araneta City in Cubao, Quezon City, Metro Manila, Philippines. The theater first opened on May 27, 1967, and primarily served as a multi-purpose theater and is also blended as a movie theater and a skating rink. The theater current has a 2,325 seating capacity, and is used for a variety of events, ranging from performing and visual arts, local and international concerts, and fan meet-up gatherings.

== History ==
=== First opening ===
The theater first opened on May 27, 1967 as the New Frontier Cinema-Theater and was considered to be the biggest theater in the Philippines, having a 3,500 seating capacity. The theater was influenced by the Radio City Music Hall, and also had an ice skating rink and a roller skating rink, which opened in 1968 and had a capacity of 900 skaters. The skating rink catered to numerous customers, ranging from the masses to elite members of influential families. It was used until the mid-1990s, after which the theater fell into disuse due to the emergence of home video, home-based entertainment systems and shows, and even due to the rise of Cable television. Another factor to the closure of the theater was caused by the rising competition from new, larger and modern malls equipped with cinemas, causing standalone theaters to deteriorate and close operations .

=== Renovation plans and second opening ===
Plans for the renovation of the theater were laid out as early as 2003, however, further redevelopment plans were opened, which included demolishing the theater to utilize the space and to rebuild it alongside a proposed 30+ story mixed-use tower. The plans for the mixed-use tower development were unveiled in 2005, as part of the later stages of the Araneta City master plan, in the aftermath of the early plans for the development of Manhattan Garden City. 11 years later after the announcement of the planned renovation of the theater, the plans were finalized for the gentrification of the theater and the renovation works would have been completed in an earlier date. The renovation project began in 2014 and was reopened on August 15, 2015, assigning Megawide Construction Corporation as the general contractor of the project. The renovation project costed ₱500 million, and included the preservation of the original façade of the building, and the installation of new modern seats. The theater currently has a 2,325 seating capacity.

The theater was renamed "Kia Theatre" after the Araneta Group signed a five-year licensing deal with Columbian Autocar Corporation, the Philippine distributor for Kia Motors until 2018, on July 15, 2015. The theater façade featured a 305.96 m^{2} (3,293.3 sq ft) Kia showroom as part of the agreement.

The theater began accommodating performances and guests with the staging of the musical, MLQ: Ang Buhay ni Manuel Luis Quezon. The first commercial show of the theater upon its reopening was The Disney Live! Mickey's Music Festival which ran from September 1 to 6, 2015. The theater reverted to its original name, the "New Frontier Theater" on October 1, 2018, and was temporarily closed for more than a year due to COVID-19 pandemic.

On June 21, 2021, the theater began serving as a secondary vaccination center, sharing its purpose with the Smart Araneta Coliseum for the rollout of the Quezon City vaccination drive against the COVID-19 pandemic, capable of vaccinating 1,000 to 1,500 people daily. On February 21, 2022, the theater also served as a vaccination center for children aged 5–11 years, in partnership with the Quezon City Local Government.

== Location ==
The theater is located within the northern area of Araneta City, a mixed-use commercial development, and is owned by the Araneta Group. The theater is located close to the Aurora Tower, and is connected to the Gateway Mall and the Manhattan Parkview via elevated bridges, both completed on the 3rd quarter of 2018 and the 3rd quarter of 2019, respectively. The theater is accessible to nearby transport points and railway stations such as the MRT 3 Cubao Station, the LRT 2 Cubao Station and other transport stations. The theater is also located near to nearby malls and buildings within the Araneta City complex, such as the Farmers Plaza, the Araneta City Cyberpark towers, the SM Cubao, the Ali Mall, and the Manhattan Gardens condominiums. Also nearby are hotels such as the Novotel Manila Araneta City and the Ibis Styles Araneta City.

== Design ==
The theater's current design was based on its original design during 1967, wherein the theater's original façade was gentrified with a modern design. The theater's floor area was also expanded, and its amenities were modernized, which includes a 447 square meters (4,810 sq ft) stage area, a 1,500 square meters (16,000 sq ft) back of house area, a stage area of 1,098 square meters (11,820 sq ft), and 8 dressing rooms. The theater's main interior has a total floor area of 1,098 square meters (11,820 sq ft) also features a mix of contemporary architectural style with modern elements of greenery, such as the installation of side balconies with planters and green wall columns. The theater's renovation also included the installation of escalators and elevators throughout the theater, and also includes expanded walkways, and a second floor within the theater's architectural design. The renovated theater's entrance is located along General Aguinaldo Avenue.

The theater also features two digital LED billboards on the façade, along with multi-level dining spaces occupied by restaurants and studios. The theater's second level also serves as a retail area for various businesses and al fresco dining spaces, known as the NFT Second Al Fresco.

== Gallery ==
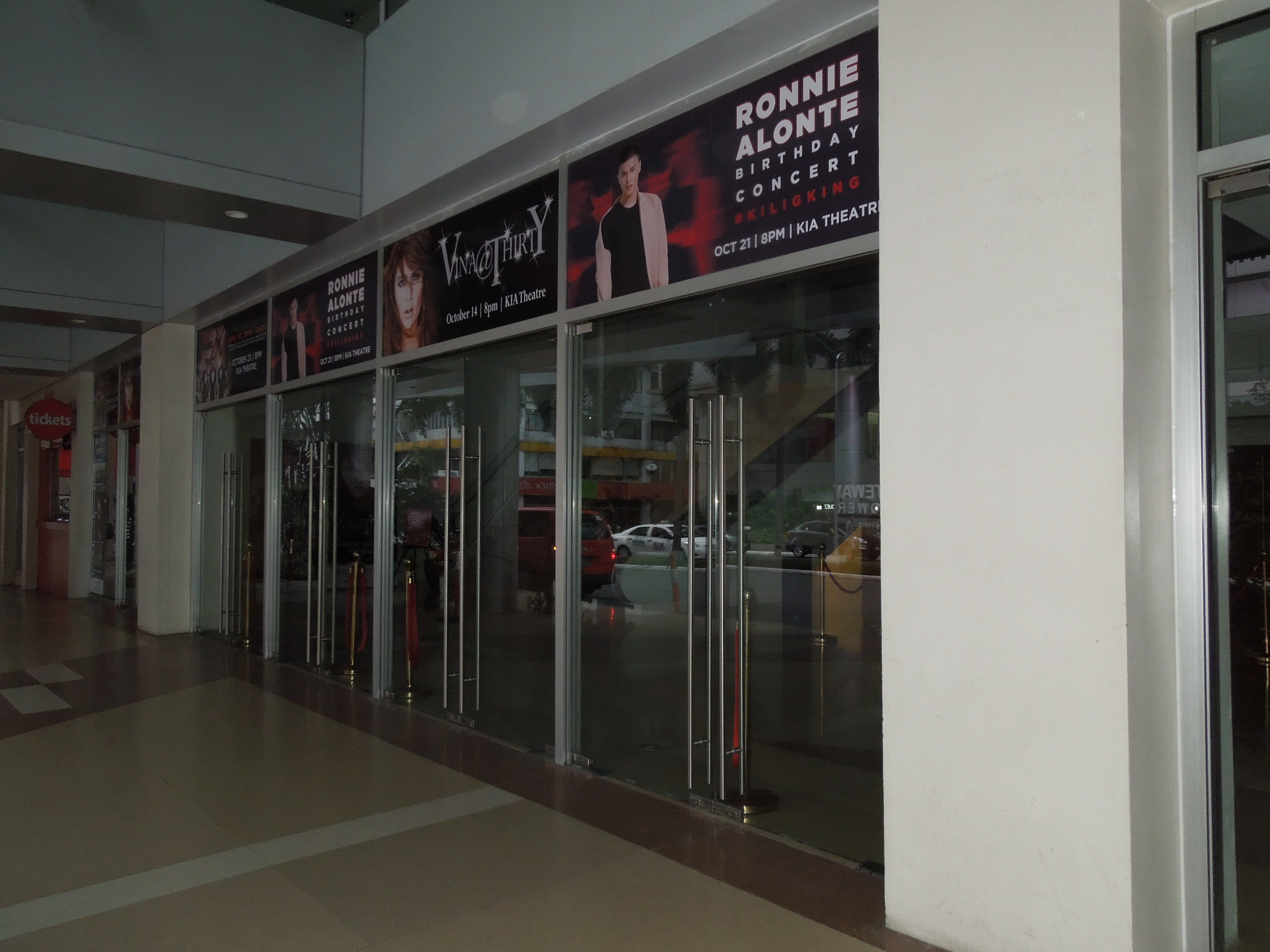
The entrance area of the New Frontier Theater

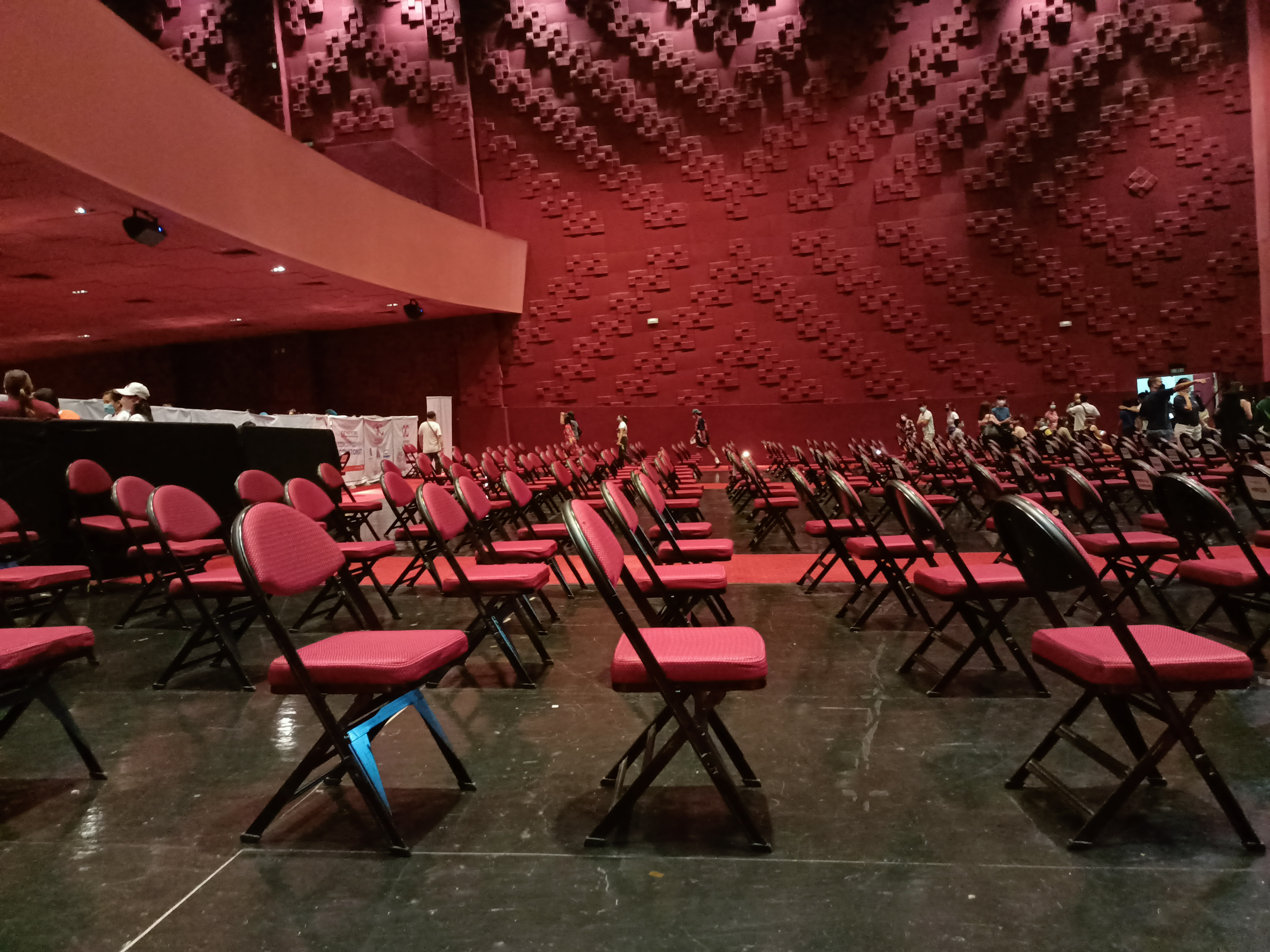
Interior when the theater was used as a COVID-19 vaccination site.

The logo of the New Frontier Theater as the Kia Theater from 2015 to 2018
