= Baduy (song) =

Single by Vvink

from the album It Starts With a Wink
- Language: Filipino; Waray
- Released: November 14, 2025
- Genre: Hyperpop; bubblegum pop; electropop
- Length: 3:42
- Label: FlipMusic Records
- Songwriter: Vvink
- Producers: DJ Love; Bojam; Mat Olivades; Jellica Mateo; Nolan Bernardino; Rap Sanchez

Vvink singles chronology
"Tatlong Hiling" (2025)	"Baduy" (2025)

Music video
- "Baduy" on YouTube

"Baduy" (transl. Cheesy) is a song by the Filipino girl group Vvink, featuring DJ Love and rapper Pio Balbuena. The song has been described as a hyperpop, bubblegum pop, and electropop track incorporating budots. Its lyrics are written in Filipino and Waray. The song received acclaim from music critics.

== Background and release ==
On July 10, 2025, the Filipino girl group Vvink debuted with the song "Tulala" (transl. Stunned). On October 15, the group released their second single "Tatlong Hiling" (transl. Three Wishes). On November 3, they began releasing teasers for their next single "Baduy" (transl. Cheesy). "Baduy" was released on November 14.

== Composition and lyrics ==
"Baduy" has been described as a hyperpop, bubblegum pop, and electropop song. The song incorporates budots, a Filipino electronic music genre with roots in Visayas and Mindanao. Its lyrics are primarily written in Filipino. Budots pioneer DJ Love and rapper Pio Balbuena are featured artists in the track. "Baduy" also contains a brief verse in the Waray language.

== Reception ==
"Baduy" received acclaim from music critics. Rolling Stone Philippines' Sai Versailles praised the song for "reclaim[ing] Pinoy kitsch through its fusion of sugary, K-pop-inspired melodies with budots' infectious percussion". Pulp's Andrea Dee called the song "addictive". Scout's Pauline Miranda commended the song for "unapologetically celebrat[ing] uniquely Filipino street party culture". Billboard Philippines' Gabriel Saulog praised the song's energy and use of budots, calling the song "significant for the evolution of Filipino pop music".

== Accolades ==
Awards and nominations for "Baduy"
Award(s)	Year	Category	Result	Refs.
Filipino Music Awards	2026	Pop Song of the Year	Won	

== Listicles ==
Publisher	Year	Listicle	Placement	Ref.
Billboard Philippines	2025	25 Best Filipino Songs of 2025	Placed	
Pulp	2025	Eight P-pop Hits for the Streets	Placed	
Pulp	2025	Pulp Loves: Our Favorite P-pop Songs of 2025	Placed	
Rolling Stone Philippines	2025	Charli XCX, Vvink, Waiian, and All the Songs You Need to Know	Placed	
The Flying Lugaw	2025	The Best Filipino Songs of 2025	Placed	
When in Manila	2025	6 P-pop Songs You Should Play at Your New Year's Eve Parties	Placed	
