= Pantropiko =

2023 single by Bini

Single by Bini

from the EP Talaarawan
- Language: Tagalog; English
- English title: Tropical
- Released: November 17, 2023
- Genre: Bubblegum pop; tropical house
- Length: 3:45
- Label: Star
- Composers: Mat Olavides; Jumbo De Belen; Angelika Ortiz; Pow Chavez
- Producers: Mat Olavides; Jumbo De Belen

Bini singles chronology
"Karera" (2023)	"Pantropiko" (2023)	"Salamin, Salamin" (2024)

Music video
- "Pantropiko" on YouTube

"Pantropiko" (lit. 'Tropical') is a song recorded by Filipino girl group Bini from their first extended play (EP), Talaarawan (2024). Written by its producers Jumbo De Belen and Mat Olavides, along with Angelika Ortiz and Pow Chavez during a songwriting camp, "Pantropiko" is a bubblegum pop track featuring tropical influences. The song features an upbeat melody and rhythm, reflecting its summer-inspired theme with catchy hooks and vibrant production. It was released by Star Music on November 17, 2023, as the second pre-release single from Talaarawan (lit. 'Diary'), following the earlier release of "Karera" (2023).

"Pantropiko" went viral on TikTok, contributing to its rise on Philippine music charts. The song received favorable to mixed reviews from critics. Positive reviews praised its lively sound and perceived catchiness, while less enthusiastic ones highlighted issues with its production. The song's popularity on streaming platforms helped Bini become Spotify's highest-streamed female OPM artist and the Filipino P-pop group with the most monthly listeners. "Pantropiko" debuted at number 17 on the Billboard Philippines Songs chart on March 23, 2024, peaking at number one on April 23, making Bini the first P-pop group to top the chart. By July 2024, the song had surpassed 100 million streams on Spotify and YouTube Music. It ranked third on Billboard Philippines' Philippines Hot 100 Year-End and Top Philippine Songs Year-End charts for 2024. The song received multiple accolades, winning Song of the Year at the P-pop Music Awards and the Myx Music Awards, along with additional wins and nominations from the Awit Awards and PMPC Star Awards for Music.

== Background and release ==
In September 2022, Bini released their second album, Feel Good. Following the album's success, the group made a comeback on September 22, 2023, with the release of "Karera" (lit. 'Race'), which served as the first pre-release single for their then-upcoming debut EP, Talaarawan, offering a preview of the group's material. Following "Karera", Star Music released "Pantropiko" on November 17, 2023, as the second pre-release single for the EP.

The choreography for "Pantropiko" was developed by Bini member Sheena, following a challenge from their dance coach Mickey Perz. She was assisted by fellow coaches Matthew Almodovar and Reden Blanquera to complete the dance. The choreography quickly became popular, contributing to the song's success. The music video was filmed at Inflatable Island Beach Club, a beach resort in Zambales.

== Composition and lyrics ==
"Pantropiko"
A 21-second sample of "Pantropiko", where a portion of the chorus can be heard.

"Pantropiko" is three minutes and forty-five seconds long. The track was produced by Jumbo De Belen and Mat Olavides, with Olavides contributing his expertise in tropical house. De Belen provided the initial instrumental, which laid the foundation for the song's tropical influence. The lyrics were written by Angelika Ortiz, who initially used the past tense phrasing in her draft. After receiving feedback, she revised the lyrics to the present tense, explaining that it better allowed listeners to feel the meaning of the song in the moment.

"Pantropiko" was created as part of a FlipMusic (Note: FlipMusic is a Philippine production house founded by its president and head producer, Jumbo "Bojam" De Belen.) songwriting camp, where multiple tracks for Bini's Talaarawan were developed. FlipMusic producer Pow Chavez contributed to the vocal arrangements. He also added the "Pantropiko, pantropiko, oh" line in the post-chorus. Olavides enriched the collaboration by incorporating African, Latin, and Caribbean music influences into his arrangement of the song, which became the published rendition.

== Reception ==
"Pantropiko" received mixed to positive reviews from music critics. Positive reviews highlighted the song's bright sound and energy. Rafael Bautista of Nylon Manila lauded the track for capturing the essence of summer romance. In Mega, Gianna Sibal described "Pantropiko" as a song that evokes warm summer days and highlights the power of music to transcend temporal constraints.

Conversely, Louis Pelingen of The Flying Lugaw said that the song's synthetic textures "completely blemish" its summery tone. Julienne Loreto and Maddie Armstrong of &Asian described the instrumentals in "Pantropiko" as "generic" and the song itself as "musically not too interesting", though they added that the song is "competently made" and more enjoyable live.

Commercially, "Pantropiko" achieved significant success on both streaming platforms and music charts. Despite being released in November 2023, the song slowly gained popularity as a sleeper hit "summer anthem" in the Philippines. The song's success was further reflected in its performance on streaming platforms such as Spotify. A few months after its release, the song went viral on TikTok. Following the release of Talaarawan on March 8 and the success of "Pantropiko", Bini became Spotify's highest-streamed female OPM artist and the Filipino P-pop group with the most monthly listeners. The song also debuted at number 17 on Billboard's Philippines Songs chart on March 23, 2024, before peaking at number five on April 20, 2024. "Pantropiko" reached number one on April 23, making Bini the first P-pop group to top the chart. Bini performed a remake of the song for a cheeseburger advertisement by Jollibee, coinciding with the group's formal endorsement of the brand on June 17, 2024. By July 2024, "Pantropiko" had surpassed 100 million streams on both Spotify and YouTube Music and ranked 65th on YouTube's Global Music Video chart. In December 2024, the song ranked third on Billboard Philippines' Philippines Hot 100 Year-End and Top Philippine Songs Year-End charts and was also Google's ninth most-searched song in the Philippines that same year.

By February 2025, the song's music video had reached more than 100 million views on YouTube. At the inauguration of The Official Philippines Chart on February 19, 2025, "Pantropiko" was recognized as one of its top five Local Songs of the Year. In 2026, Rolling Stone Philippines placed "Pantropiko" as Bini's fifth best song in its latest list.

== Live performances ==
"Pantropiko" was included in Bini's opening lineup in their performance at Coachella 2026 on April 10.

== In popular culture ==
The song's dance routine was used as a victory dance by the Philippines women's national volleyball team after they won the bronze medal at the 2024 Asian Women's Volleyball Challenge Cup on May 29, 2024—the country's first medal in an Asian Volleyball Confederation tournament.

"Pantropiko" was used by Singaporean Prime Minister Lawrence Wong as background music in a TikTok video documenting his 2025 visit to the Philippines, drawing attention from Filipino netizens who recognized the song and praised his music taste.

== Accolades ==
Awards and nominations for "Pantropiko"Awards and nominations for Pantropiko
Award	Year	Category	Result	Ref.
Awit Awards	2024	Record of the Year	Nominated	
Awit Awards	2024	Song of the Year	Nominated	
Awit Awards	2024	Best Performance by a Group	Nominated	
Awit Awards	2024	Best Pop Recording	Nominated	
Awit Awards	2024	Best Engineered Recording	Nominated	
Awit Awards	2024	People's Voice Favorite Record of the Year	Won	
Awit Awards	2024	People's Voice Favorite Song of the Year	Won	
Myx Music Awards	2024	Song of the Year	Won	
New Hue Video Music Awards	2025	Song of the Year	Nominated	
PMPC Star Awards for Music	2024	Song of the Year	Nominated	
PMPC Star Awards for Music	2024	Duo/Group Artist of the Year	Won	
PMPC Star Awards for Music	2024	Dance Recording of the Year	Nominated	
P-pop Music Awards	2024	Song of the Year	Won	
Wish Music Awards	2025	Wish Pop Song of the Year	Won	

== Listicles ==
Publisher	Year	Listicle	Placement	Ref.
SunStar Davao	2024	Tatak Noypi (Note: lit. 'Mark of a Filipino', Noypi is a slang term derived from reversing syllables of Pinoy, an informal word for Filipino.): 10 OPM Songs that Defined 2024	Placed	
Bandwagon Asia	2025	10 Southeast Asian Boy and Girl Bands whose Hits will Awaken your Inner Fangirl	Placed	

== Credits and personnel ==
Credits are adapted from Apple Music.

- Bini – vocals
- Angelika Samantha Ortiz – songwriter
- Jumbo De Belen – songwriter, producer
- Mat Olavides – songwriter, producer
- Pow Chavez – songwriter

== Charts ==
=== Weekly charts ===
Chart (2024)	Peak position
Philippines (Billboard)	1
Philippines Hot 100 (Billboard Philippines)	4
Philippines Top Songs (Billboard Philippines)	3

=== Monthly charts ===
Chart (2025)	Peak position
Philippines P-pop Songs (Billboard Philippines)	5

=== Year-end charts ===
Chart (2024)	Peak position
Philippines Hot 100 (Billboard Philippines)	3
Philippines Top Songs (Billboard Philippines)	3
