= Pa-Pa-Pa-Palaban =

Single by G22

from the album The Dissection of Eve
- Language: Tagalog; English
- English title: Fi-Fi-Fi-Fighting
- Released: March 7, 2025
- Genre: Pop
- Length: 3:54
- Label: Cornerstone
- Songwriters: Angel Jermae Yape; Julius James De Belen; Mart Sam Emmanuel Olavides; Pow Chavez

G22 singles chronology
"I Hate Boys" (2024)	"Pa-Pa-Pa-Palaban" (2025)	"Filipina Queen" (2025)

Pa-Pa-Pa-Palaban (transl. Fi-Fi-Fi-Fighting) is a song by the Filipino girl group G22. Cornerstone Entertainment released it on March 7, 2025, during the International Women's Month and as a track for the debut studio album, The Dissection of Eve. It was written by Angel Jeremae Yape, Julius James De Belen, Mart Sam Emmanuel Olavides, and Pow Chavez. It features musical elements influenced by 2010s pop and brassy pop.

== Background and release ==
Before the release of the song, G22 released a series of concept photographs. The first set featured a metallic-themed aesthetic with the members dressed in black outfits. A subsequent set presented the group in red attire described as a "femme fatale" look. Prior to these teasers, the group cleared their Instagram page, which drew attention among fans. On March 4, 2025, the girl group announced that their new single is set to release on March 7, 2025. They released the song accompanied by music video on March 9, 2025.

== Composition ==
Pa-Pa-Pa-Palaban is three minutes and fifty-four seconds long. Written by Angel Jeremae Yape, Julius James De Belen, Mart Sam Emmanuel Olavides, and Pow Chavez. It incorporates with 2010s pop and brassy pop styles while avoiding a dated sound. The song was to coincide with International Women's Month. According to the group, the single conveys the message that women are "fighters in their own ways." Member AJ Yape stated that she was not comfortable with remarks that positioned G22's concept against more traditionally feminine approaches in the music scene, emphasizing instead that showing one's "softer side" can also be a form of strength. The group noted that the song had originally been planned for release the previous year, but its production required additional work to meet their standards.

== Credits ==
Credits are adapted by Tidal.

- G22 – vocal
- Angel Jermae Yape – composer, lyricist
- Julius James De Belen – composer, lyricist
- Mart Sam Emmanuel Olavides – composer, lyricist
- Pow Chavez – composer, lyricist

== Awards and nominations ==
Organization	Year	Category	Result	Ref.
P-pop Music Awards	2025	Music Video of the Year	Nominated	

== Listicles ==
Name of publisher, year listed, name of listicle, and placement
Publisher	Year	Listicle	Placement	Ref.
Pulp	2025	Pulp Loves: Our Favorite P-pop Songs of 2025	Placed	
