= Miss Possibilities =

Special needs beauty pageant in the Philippines

- Formation: 2015
- Type: Beauty Pageant
- Headquarters: Manila
- Location: Philippines
- Official language: English
- President: Suzanna Pavadee Vicheinrut Yuzon
- Key people: Suzanna Pavadee Vicheinrut Yuzon (Founder)
- Website: Miss Possibilities (Facebook page)

Miss Possibilities is a Filipino beauty pageant for young women with special needs. The pageant is also dubbed as first of its kind in the Philippines and in Asia.

== History ==
Suzanna Pavadee Vicheinrut Yuzon, a two-time winner of the Mrs. Thailand pageant who became the Mrs. World beauty pageant winner in 2003 is the founder of the Miss Possibilities beauty pageant. The beauty pageant aims to convey the message that everything is "possible" for girls, even those with special needs.

Yuzon came across with a poster of Miss Unlimited (a beauty pageant also for young women with special needs) during her vacation in California and uploaded a picture of the poster with a caption of "Sana, one day in the Philippines" (I wish, one day in the Philippines) to raise awareness about the needs and important roles of those who are like her daughter. The said post got the attention of Eric Teng of the Mango Tree Restaurant group who offered his Mango Tree restaurant in Bonifacio Global City as the venue of the first Miss Possibilities beauty pageant.

As part of the pageant organizers' efforts in searching for candidates, they promoted the beauty pageant through school visits and putting up posters of the pageants in schools and therapy centers.

=== Humanitarian Projects ===
The annual Miss Possibilities beauty pageant is organized by Miss Possibilities Foundation Inc. The beauty pageant's advocacies are the following:

- To create social awareness of people with different needs and their important role in society.
- To build the self-confidence of young women with different needs and celebrate their life accomplishments.
- To redefine the meaning of true beauty and showcase inner beauty

== Title Holders ==
=== Recent titleholders ===
Year	Country	Miss Possibilities	Location	Number of Entrants
2015	Philippines	Nicey Ignacio	Taguig, Philippines	15
2016	Philippines	Alyssa Guerrero	Henry Lee Irwin Theater, Ateneo De Manila University	11
2017	Philippines	Jennica Garcia	Henry Lee Irwin Theater, Ateneo De Manila University	10
2018	Philippines	Samantha Pia Cabanera	Henry Lee Irwin Theater, Ateneo De Manila University	12
2019	Philippines	Cielo Marie Guico	SMX Convention Center, SM Mall Of Asia	11
