= Talaarawan =

- Digital cover

EP by Bini
- Released: March 8, 2024
- Recorded: 2023–2024
- Genre: Pop; bubblegum pop; chiptunes; funk; tropical house
- Length: 22:44
- Language: Tagalog; English
- Label: Star
- Producer: Bojam; Jumbo De Belen; Mat Olavides; Jose Miguel Cortes

Bini chronology
Feel Good (2022)	Talaarawan (2024)	Biniverse (2025)

Singles from Talaarawan
- 1. "Karera" Released: September 22, 2023; 2. "Pantropiko" Released: November 17, 2023; 3. "Salamin, Salamin" Released: March 8, 2024

Talaarawan (lit. 'Diary') is the debut extended play (EP) of Filipino girl group Bini. It was released by Star Music on March 8, 2024. It consists of six tracks, of which three were released as singles, "Karera", "Pantropiko", and "Salamin, Salamin".

The singles, particularly "Karera" and "Pantropiko", gained significant popularity, with "Karera" widely recognized at school graduation ceremonies and "Pantropiko" topping domestic charts, being regarded as a summer anthem in the Philippines. This success contributed to the group's rise in popularity, becoming the first Filipino pop group with the most monthly listeners on Spotify.

== Background and release ==
On February 14, 2024, Bini announced that their debut EP, Talaarawan, would be released on March 8, 2024. During a Valentine's Day event, Bini's leader Jhoanna revealed in an interview that the release date was intentionally selected to serve as a gift for their fans and to symbolize celebration and appreciation for their supporters.

Bini member Mikha emphasized Bini's advocacy for women’s empowerment, expressing their desire to inspire women and boost confidence in all individuals. During their media conference for the EP, she noted that the release date coinciding with International Women’s Day aligns with their goal to empower and inspire. Jhoanna described the EP, Talaarawan, which means diary in Tagalog, as a comforting record for their fans. She explained that the EP captures their group's journey and expressed hope that it would provide comfort and a sense of connection to their fans, similar to a diary where they could open up and find relief through their music.

Talaarawan, along with its lead single "Salamin, Salamin" (lit. 'Mirror, Mirror') was officially released on March 8, 2024. Two of the track's singles, namely "Karera" (lit. 'Race') and "Pantropiko" (lit. 'Tropical') had previously been released in late 2023 as promotional tracks for the EP. On October 31, 2024, Backspacer Records announced that the EP, along with Bini's albums Born to Win and Feel Good, would be released as vinyl records in December 2024 as part of their collaboration with Star Music. In 2025, the vinyl records were reissued for sale in response to demand, with a limited pre-sale beginning on May 1, 2025.

== Composition ==
Talaarawan is an EP consisting of six tracks, all written in Tagalog. The opening track, "Karera", was originally written by Nica Del Rosario and was composed by her along with Jumbo De Belen and Jose Miguel Cortes. Inspired by Del Rosario's own experiences, the song emphasizes the importance of self-care and avoiding societal pressures. Bini members Colet, Mikha, and Stacey co-wrote the rap part of the song.

The lead single, "Salamin, Salamin" (lit. 'Mirror, Mirror'), was composed by John Michael Conchada, Paula Rose Alcasid, and Paulo Miguel Rañeses and produced by Bojam and Mat Olavides. It is a bubblegum pop and funk song with a prominent groovy bassline. Its lyrics have fairytale motifs and are from the perspective of a young woman who longs for her crush's attention. The third track, "Pantropiko," was written by Angelika Ortiz, Jumbo De Belen, Mat Olavides, and Pow Chavez. It is a tropical house song with musical influences from African, Latin, and Caribbean genres. "Ang Huling Cha Cha" (The Last Cha-cha), also by Del Rosario, explores the complexities of situationships and unreciprocated feelings. "Na Na Nandito Lang" (Just Here), is a song that offers reassurance of support amidst challenges. It was written by Kim Grabrielle Songsong, Jumbo De Belen, and Pow Chavez. The EP concludes with "Diyan Ka Lang" (Stay There) a tribute to those who provide unwavering support, written by de Belen and Chavez and composed by de Belen. The track incorporates the Philippine production house FlipMusic's signature "addictive" chiptune riffs.

== Accolades ==
Awards and nominations for Talaarawan
Ceremony	Year	Category	Result	Ref.
Awit Awards	2025	Album of the Year	Won	
P-pop Awards	2024	Album of the Year	Won	
PMPC Star Awards for Music	2026	Album of the Year	Nominated	
PMPC Star Awards for Music	2026	Duo/Group Artist of the Year	Nominated	
PMPC Star Awards for Music	2026	Pop Album of the Year	Won	

Critics' rankings of Talaarawan
Publication	Accolade	Rank	Ref.
Billboard Philippines	The 50 Best Albums and EPs of 2024	Placed	
Billboard Philippines	This Year's Must Have Records	Placed	

== Track listing ==
Talaarawan track listing
No.	Title	Writer(s)	Producer(s)	Length
1.	"Karera"	Nica Del Rosario; Jumbo De Belen; Jose Miguel Cortes; Ma. Nicolette Vergara; Mikhaela Janna Lim; Stacey Aubrey Sevilleja	Bojam; Jose Miguel Cortes	4:28
2.	"Salamin, Salamin"	John Michael Conchada; Paula Rose Alcasid; Paulo Miguel Rañeses	Bojam; Mat Olavides	3:50
3.	"Pantropiko"	Angelika Ortiz; Jumbo De Belen; Mat Olavides; Pow Chavez	Jumbo De Belen; Mat Olavides	3:45
4.	"Ang Huling Cha Cha"	Jumbo De Belen; Nica Del Rosario	Bojam	3:21
5.	"Na Na Nandito Lang"	Jumbo De Belen; Kim Gabrielle Songsong; Pow Chavez	Bojam	4:01
6.	"Diyan Ka Lang"	Jumbo De Belen; Pow Chavez	Bojam	3:17
Total length:				22:44

== Certifications ==
Certifications for Talaarawan
Region	Certification	Certified units/sales
Philippines (PARI)	Platinum	15,000^{*}
^{*} Sales figures based on certification alone.

== Release history ==
Release history and formats for Talaarawan
Region	Date	Format	Label	Ref.
Various	March 8, 2024	Digital download; streaming	Star Music	
Philippines	November 10, 2024	Vinyl	Star Music	
