= Lagi (song) =

Single by Bini

from the album Feel Good
- Language: Tagalog
- English title: Always
- Released: June 24, 2022
- Studio: AORG Studio
- Genre: Bubblegum pop; pop rock; synth-pop
- Length: 4:16
- Label: Star
- Songwriter: Louie Canaria
- Producer: Jonathan Manalo

Bini singles chronology
"Pit a Pat" (2022)	"Lagi" (2022)	"I Feel Good" (2022)

Music video
- "Lagi" on YouTube

"Lagi" (lit. 'Always') is a song recorded by the Filipino girl group Bini from their second album Feel Good (2022). Written and composed by Louie Canaria, "Lagi" is an upbeat bubblegum, pop rock, and synth-pop track. Its drum beat draws inspiration from alternative rock and punk rock acts, while the vocal stylings contain traces of R&B. The song also features 8-bit and 16-bit chiptunes influenced by retro video games. "Lagi" was released as a single by Star Music on June 24, 2022, later appearing as a track on Bini's second album Feel Good in September.

"Lagi" achieved moderate commercial success and garnered praise from critics and fans alike. Rafael Bautista of Nylon Manila lauded the track for its seamless blend of meaningful lyrics, polished production, and compelling vocals. In a 2024 interview with the Philippine Daily Inquirer, Bini member Gwen highlighted "Lagi" as a pivotal moment for the group, explaining that after experimenting with various genres, the song marked their breakthrough success. Inquirer writer Mallorca also cited Filipino-American journalist Lai Frances, who described the song as an example of P-pop songs that convey genuine honesty, noting its refreshing tone and conversational style. The song entered Billboard Philippines' Philippines Hot 100 and Top Philippine Songs charts, peaking at number nine and five, respectively. Additionally, "Lagi" was featured as a soundtrack in the 2022 romantic comedy film An Inconvenient Love and the 2024 Philippine romantic comedy series What's Wrong with Secretary Kim.

== Background and release ==
Bini dabbled in different genres before returning to the bubblegum pop sound of "Lagi". It was released as a single on June 27, 2022. On September 29, Bini released their second album, Feel Good, which includes both the original version of "Lagi" and an acoustic version.

The song was later included in the soundtrack for the 2022 romantic comedy film An Inconvenient Love, as well as the 2024 romantic comedy series What's Wrong with Secretary Kim, the Philippine adaptation of the 2018 Korean series of the same name.

== Composition and lyrics ==
"Lagi"
A 25-second sample of "Lagi", where the chorus can be heard.

"Lagi" was composed by Louie Canaria, with musical arrangement by Ramiru Mataro and vocal arrangement by Anna Graham. The track was produced by Jonathan Manalo. Jeremy G is also credited for recording "Lagi" at the AORG Studio and Theo Martel for "additional synths". The song has been characterized as a bubblegum pop or bubblegum-influenced song. In an interview with Julienne Loreto of Visayan magazine Kasing2, Mataro said the track is also pop rock, with him having drawn inspiration from alternative rock and punk acts such as No Doubt, Michelle Branch, Maroon 5, Avril Lavigne, and Alanis Morissette for the drums in "Lagi". 8-bit and 16-bit chiptunes can also be heard in the song, contributing a synth-pop influence. Originally conceived by Canaria as a new jack swing song, it retains traces of R&B in the vocals as well.

Lyrically, "Lagi" describes the giddy thrill of falling in love. The narrator in "Lagi" talks about constantly singing in joy for their lover and being unable to suppress their feelings for the person. The Philippine Daily Inquirer's Jelou Galang wrote that the song "perfectly" captures the scenarios that somebody may imagine when a new person is "overstaying" in their head, listing it as a song that matches the first stage of infatuation.

== Reception ==
The vocal performances in "Lagi" was praised by critics and fans alike, especially the climactic bridge and final chorus sung by the group's main vocalists Colet and Maloi and one of their lead vocalists, Jhoanna. Rafael Bautista of Nylon Manila wrote that "Lagi" was reminiscent of Filipino bubblegum pop music from the early 2010s, but with a "fresh coat of paint". In a separate article, he stated, "From the lyrics, production, and vocals, Lagi hits the mark as a modern love song and wonderfully captures the feeling of having butterflies when you think about that special someone." &Asian listed it as the third best P-pop song of the 21st century so far, tied with SB19's "Mapa". Jose Alfonso Ignacio Mirabueno, one of the first-ever Musicology students to graduate with a summa cum laude honor from the University of the Philippines Diliman, analyzed Bini's discography for his thesis. He chose "Lagi" as his favorite song, praising it for containing both simple and complex elements. In 2026, Rolling Stone Philippines placed "Lagi" as Bini's second best song after "Salamin, Salamin" in its latest list.

The track steered the group toward the "cutesy" bubblegum pop niche for which they are now known. In a 2023 interview with Billboard Philippines, Bini member Mikha said, "I hope they expect something different from us, but also we want to stick with that sound that we found. Especially since 'Lagi,' a lot of people really liked it, it was very relatable, very bubblegum pop[...]." In a 2024 interview with the Philippine Daily Inquirer, fellow member Gwen echoed Mikha's sentiments, identifying "Lagi" as a turning point for the group. She said that after experimenting with various genres, they finally found success with the song. Lai Frances, a Filipino-American journalist and moderator for the KCON LA panel, cited "Lagi" as an example of P-pop songs that promote "honesty". Frances said, "It's refreshing to hear. It makes you feel like you're catching up with somebody and they want to get to know you. I think that's what I love about it the most."

"Lagi" was featured on three of Spotify's officially curated playlists: P-Pop on the Rise, Radar Philippines and New Music Friday. Following the virality of "Pantropiko" (transl. Tropical), older Bini tracks such as "Lagi" exceeded ten million streams on Spotify in 2024. In July that year, "Lagi" peaked at number five on Billboard Philippines' Top Philippine Songs chart. "Lagi" peaked on their Philippines Hot 100 chart in the week of July 6, at number nine.

== Music video ==
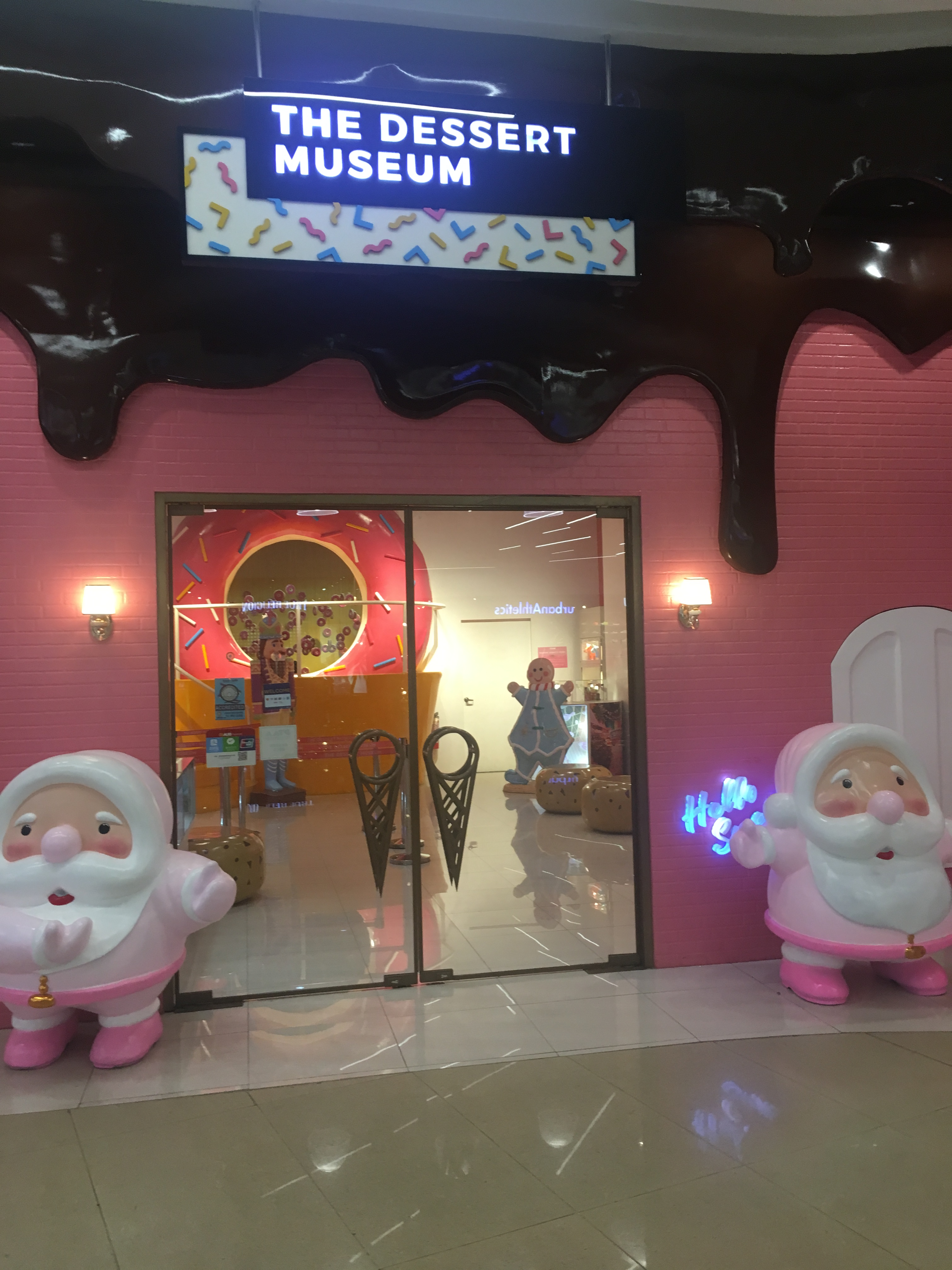
Most of the music video for the song "Lagi" by Bini was filmed in the Dessert Museum.

The music video starts with the Bini members in an online class with a young man who hides his face behind a teddy bear mask. The members are then magically transported to a colorful candy land, sharing romantic moments with their masked classmate. Brian Santamaria portrays the man in the bear mask.

The video was produced by the creative content agency YouMeUs MNL and directed by Amiel Kirby Balagtas. It was filmed in the Dessert Museum, a candy-themed interactive art exhibition in Pasay.

== Live performances ==
The group first performed "Lagi" live in July 2022, on the variety program It's Showtime. In the following week, "Lagi" was one of the songs that Bini performed at the first-ever Tugatog Music Festival, which took place in the SM Mall of Asia Arena on July 15, 2022. Nikko Tuazon of PEP.ph reported that the group faced technical difficulties, but continued to perform. In June 2023, the group's official YouTube channel uploaded a dance practice video for "Lagi" with live singing. The members' vocal stability as they danced was praised and the clip went viral.

Bini performed "Lagi" as the opening act during a 2024 celebration of Philippine Independence Day at the Quirino Grandstand in Manila. However, safety concerns arose during their performance, as unruly crowds led to medical emergencies for some attendees. Others climbed the scaffolding in an attempt to enter the venue. Due to the escalating situation, the group was forced to cut their performance short. At the Grand Biniverse in November 2024, Bini performed an R&B arrangement of "Lagi".

== Accolades ==
Awards and nominations for "Lagi"
Organization	Year	Category	Result	Ref.
Awit Awards	2023	Record of the Year	Nominated	
Awit Awards	2023	Song of the Year	Nominated	
Awit Awards	2023	Best Performance by a Group Recording Artist	Nominated	
Awit Awards	2023	Best Pop Recording	Nominated	

== Listicles ==
Publisher	Year	Listicle	Placement	Ref.
&Asian	2025	The 25 Best P-pop Songs of the 21st Century: So Far	3rd	

== Charts ==
=== Weekly charts ===
Chart (2024)	Peak position
Philippines (Philippines Hot 100)	9
Philippines (Top Philippine Songs)	5

=== Year-end charts ===
Chart (2024)	Peak position
Philippines (Philippines Hot 100)	45
