= The Dissection of Eve =

Studio album by G22
- Released: November 22, 2025
- Genres: Pop; pop ballad; hip-hop; electropop; R&B
- Length: 26:31
- Languages: Tagalog; English
- Label: Cornerstone
- Producers: Alfea Marie Gonzalez; Angel Jeremae Yape; Carlo Oraya; Jem Florendo; Michael Negapatan; Pauline Lauron; Theo Martel Alpas

Singles from The Dissection of Eve
- 1. "Pa-Pa-Pa-Palaban" Released: March 7, 2025; 2. "Filipina Queen" Released: May 30, 2025

The Dissection of Eve is the debut studio album by the Filipino girl group G22. It was released on November 22, 2025, by Cornerstone Entertainment. It contains eight tracks, two of which were released as singles, "Pa-Pa-Pa-Palaban" and "Filipina Queen". It was produced by Alfea Marie Gonzalez, Angel Jeremae Yape, Carlo Oraya, Jem Florendo, Michael Negapatan, Pauline Lauron, and Theo Martel Alpas.

== Background and release ==
G22 released the single "Filipina Queen" on May 30, 2025. The group announced the song on their social media accounts, accompanied by the concept photographs featured a color gold and a short preview of the chorus. The release was followed by music video.

On August 9, 2025, during the "Break the Limit" show at the Mall of Asia Arena, G22 presented their cover version of "Golden," a track featured in the soundtrack of the animated film KPop Demon Hunters. Their fans have informally called the group as "Filipina Huntrix", noting perceived similarities to the fictional girl group.

After releasing of "Filipina Queen," they announced on Facebook that their debut album was set to release on November 22, 2025, with a teaser scheduled for November 15. The group also shared concept photos, including images of member AJ presented with an ethereal theme.

== Composition ==
The Dissection of Eve is described as focusing on themes of self-empowerment and group's development as a trio. The members have stated that the album is dedicated to "the female alpha," representing strength, vulnerability, achievements, and personal experience. The album's first track and single "Pa-Pa-Pa-Palaban", a pop track influenced by 2010s styles. "Lakumpake!" continues the empowering themes introduced in the first song. "Groove On' is an R&B track with Y2K influences, with produced by Theo Martel, who also worked on Bini's single "Lagi". "Super Saiyan" features hip-hop elements with synths and rap verses. "KIAK (Kung Ikaw At Ako)" combines electropop and R&B with a romantic theme. "Until When (Kinakaya Ko Pa)" is a pop ballad with orchestral arrangements.

== Reception ==
The Dissection of Eve received acclaim from music critics. Andrea Dee of Pulp praised the album for reinforcing G22's musical identity as bold, confident, and emotional, adding that the album explores different aspects of womanhood. Julienne Loreto of &Asian called Dissection "commendably cohesive", naming it as the "finest" P-pop album of the year. Rolling Stone Philippines' Elijah Pareño wrote that the G22 members' "voice as a unit" was evident in the way that the album's tracks "connect" with the listener. Gabriel Saulog of Billboard Philippines called the album "groundbreaking".

Commercially, the album peaked at number one on iTunes Philippines' Top Albums chart starting from November 28.

== Track listing ==
The Dissection of Eve track listing
No.	Title	Writer(s)	Producer(s)	Length
1.	"Pa-Pa-Pa-Palaban"	Angel Jermae Yape; Julius James De Belen; Mart Sam Emmanuel Olavides; Pow Chavez		3:54
2.	"Lakumpake!"	Yape	Yape; Michael Negapatan	2:45
3.	"Groove On"	Jasmine Therese Montemayor Henry; Mary Grace Negapatan; Michael Negapatan	Theo Martel Alpas	3:39
4.	"Super Saiyan"	Yape; Darlon Adrian Elmedolan; Joseph Maranan	Yape; Michael Negapatan	3:42
5.	"KIAK (Kung Ikaw At Ako)"	Alfea Marie Gonzalez Zulueta	Michael Negapatan; Zulueta	2:38
6.	"Until When? (Kinakaya Ko Pa)"	Yape; Jasmine Therese Montemayor Henry	Jem Florendo; Pauline Lauron	3:12
7.	"First"	Henry; Jason Marvin	Carlo Oraya; Henry	3:32
8.	"Filipina Queen"	Yape		3:09
Total length:				26:31

== Listicles ==
Name of publisher, year listed, name of listicle, and placement
Publisher	Year	Listicle	Placement	Ref.
Billboard Philippines	2025	25 Best Filipino Albums and EPs of 2025	Placed	

== See also ==
- Destino by Alamat
- Flames by Bini
