= Strings (Bini song) =

- Promotional image

Single by Bini

from the album Feel Good
- Language: Tagalog; English
- Released: September 29, 2022
- Genre: Hip-hop; jazz; synth-pop
- Length: 2:32
- Label: Star
- Composer: Bini
- Producer: Jonathan Manalo

Bini singles chronology
"I Feel Good" (2022)	"Strings" (2022)	"Karera" (2023)

Music video
- "Strings on YouTube

"Strings" is a song recorded by the Filipino girl group Bini. The song was released as a single, accompanied by a music video, on September 29, 2022, alongside the group's second album, Feel Good. It has been described as a hip-hop, jazz, and synth-pop track. "Strings" received favorable reviews from critics.

== Background and release ==
On September 22, 2022, Filipino girl group Bini released the song "I Feel Good", a week before their second album Feel Good was scheduled for release on September 29. The ending of the "light-hearted" music video for "I Feel Good" hinted at a darker upcoming release, depicting the band hanging by strings as lifeless marionettes. On September 29, Bini released Feel Good, as well as their next single "Strings" and its music video. The song has been described as "a gritty and fierce comeback single", while the video shows the members wearing darker tones than their usual style.

== Composition and lyrics ==
Rafael Bautista of Nylon Manila described the song's sound as "hard-edged" and "dark" pop, noting the inclusion of a marching band in the instrumentals. "Strings" has also been described as "a hip-hop/jazz hybrid" and synth-pop. Writer Julienne Loreto further observed that the track was "experimental" and "genre-mashing", noting that it incorporates "big band swing hooks", bongos, and "deep" bass. "Strings" has a vocal range of G♯/A♭_{3} to F♯/G♭_{5}.

== Reception ==
"Strings" received favorable reviews from music critics, most of whom praised the track for showing a different side to Bini. Nylon Manila's Rafael Bautista wrote that he wished to hear more of the song's dark sound from the group, adding that the "bars, runs, and harmonies hit particularly hard" on "Strings". The Philippine Daily Inquirer's Hannah Mallorca praised the song for "pushing [the Bini members] to their limits as vocalists, dancers, and performers". According to Mayks Go of Billboard Philippines, the track's "fiercer" sound is proof of Bini's "versatility". &Asian's Julienne Loreto hailed the song as "innovative" and "intense".

== Music video ==
The music video has been described as "action-packed", depicting the members of Bini as superheroes.

== In other media ==
=== Live performances ===
In late 2022, Bini performed "Strings" at the Asap Natin 'To (lit. 'This is our Asap') show held in Las Vegas. In January 2023, Bini performed "Strings" on MTV Asia's MTV Jammin' segment, filmed in New York City.

=== In popular culture ===
"Strings" was one of the songs that American gymnast Aleah Finnegan performed at the 2024 Summer Olympics, along with "Alors on danse" (lit. 'And so we dance') by Stromae and "Ringo" by Itzy. In the musical Delia D., the titular Delia—a drag queen who dreams of becoming a singer—performs "Strings" in one of her "most pivotal" scenes. Delia D. commenced its first run at the Newport Performing Arts Theater in 2025.

== Listicles ==
The song appeared in several listicles across various publications, such as the Philippine Daily Inquirer, Billboard Philippines, and &Asian.
