= Salamin, Salamin =

2024 single by Bini

Single by Bini

from the EP Talaarawan
- Language: Tagalog; English
- English title: Mirror, Mirror
- Released: March 8, 2024
- Genre: Bubblegum pop; funk
- Length: 3:50
- Label: Star
- Songwriters: John Michael Conchada; Paula Rose Alcasid; Paulo Miguel Rañeses
- Producers: Mat Olavides; Bojam

Bini singles chronology
"Pantropiko" (2023)	"Salamin, Salamin" (2024)	"Cherry on Top" (2024)

Music video
- "Salamin, Salamin" on YouTube

"Salamin, Salamin" (lit. 'Mirror, Mirror') is a song recorded by Filipino girl group Bini. It is a bubblegum pop and funk song with a prominent groovy bassline. The lyrics reference fairytales, with the narrator asking her magic mirror when her crush will notice her. Star Music released "Salamin, Salamin" as the third and lead single of Bini's first extended play (EP) Talaarawan on March 8, 2024.

"Salamin, Salamin" became one of Bini's most popular songs and peaked at number one on the Billboard Philippines Songs chart on June 8, 2024. In February 2025, Tatler Asia recognized the ubiquity of "Salamin, Salamin" in the Philippines throughout the year of 2024, along with "Pantropiko" (lit. 'Tropical'), the previously released single from Talaarawan. The inaugural Official Philippines Chart, launched on February 19, also acknowledged "Salamin, Salamin" as 2024's top four local song, based on aggregate data collected from Spotify, Apple Music, Deezer, and YouTube Music.

== Background and release ==
After promoting "Karera" and the sleeper hit "Pantropiko" as pre-release singles for their upcoming EP, Bini released Talaarawan together with its lead single "Salamin, Salamin" on March 8, 2024, International Women's Day, to align with the group's advocacy on women empowerment. An accompanying music video was posted on YouTube on the same day; it garnered over one million views by March 27, within nearly three weeks of its release.

== Composition and lyrics ==
"Salamin, Salamin" is a bubblegum pop and funk song with a prominent groovy bassline. The Bini members' vocals span from C_{4} to F♯/G♭_{5} in the song.

Its lyrics are written in Tagalog and English and incorporate fairytale motifs, with the narrator asking her magic mirror if her crush will notice her. The track was produced by Mat Olavides and Bojam and composed by John Michael Conchada, Paula Rose Alcasid, and Paulo Miguel Rañeses. The song also contains direct references to fairytales such as Mikha's line in the bridge "Mirror, mirror on the wall," from the Brothers Grimm's original Snow White text.

== Reception ==
=== Reviews ===
According to Precy Tan of Nylon Manila, "Salamin, Salamin" resonated deeply within the hearts of individuals who are stuck in uncertain situationships. She added, "In a world where mixed signals have become an art form, this track literally screams 'Better say it now, it's not too late. I'm ready to be called your princess.'" Mika Geronimo of Rappler wrote that the song had a charming approach towards teenage love, similar to Talaarawan's previous single, "Pantropiko". SunStar Davao included "Salamin" in their "10 OPM songs that defined 2024" list, with the song placing at number two. In the article, SunStar writer Ralph Lawrence G. Llemit praised the song's "infectious" melody and uplifting message that resonated with Filipinos, declaring "Salamin" to be the group's "crown jewel" for the year. In 2026, Rolling Stone Philippines placed "Salamin, Salamin" as Bini's top song in its latest list.

=== Audience reception ===
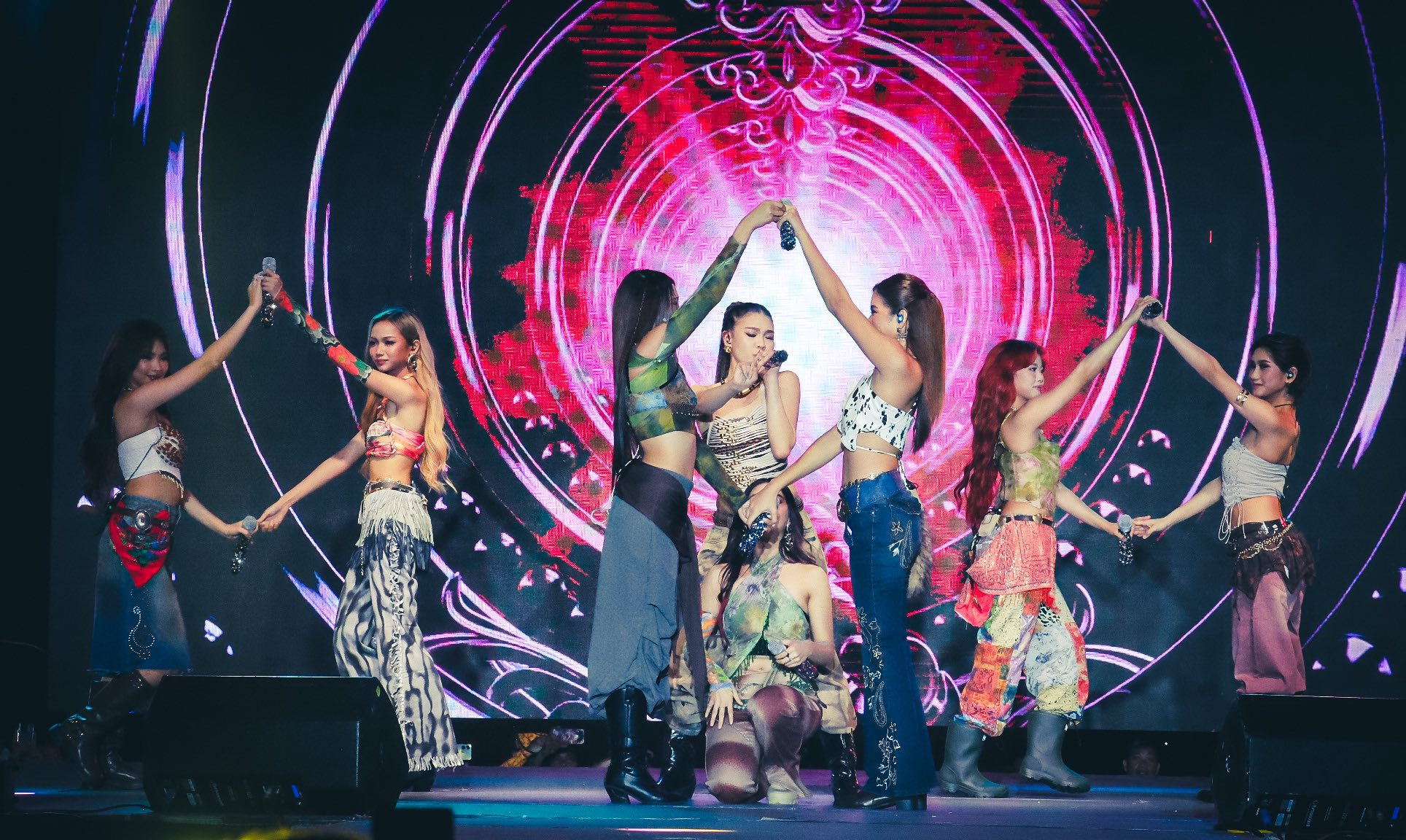
Bini performing "Salamin, Salamin" at the Ibalong Festival in September 2025

A variety of media outlets have reported that numerous public figures were spotted dancing or singing along to "Salamin, Salamin". This includes Filipino public figures such as actresses Gabbi Garcia, Jennylyn Mercado, and Iza Calzado, as well as Philippine Basketball Association players. Foreign pop groups like J-pop's Psychic Fever from Exile Tribe and K-pop's Riize also danced to the song. In a feature for Tatler Asia, Jove Moya remarked on the song's ubiquity throughout the year of 2024, writing, "The gay bars, supermarkets, and car radios were dominated by one girl group throughout 2024. If it wasn't Bini's 'Pantropiko', it was 'Salamin, Salamin' playing on loop in these places all year round."

The phrase "eyyy", which was included in the song's lyrics, also became popular in Filipino parlance and became associated with Bini member Sheena. A few months after the song was released, a Christian content creator claimed that "Salamin Salamin" was a witchcraft song. The creator's post linked the song's lyrics to a book titled Mirror Magic (Scrying, Spells, Curses and Other Witch Crafts) by Viivi James, among other things. The Bini members firmly denied the claims, calling them "funny" and "fake news".

== Commercial performance ==
Coupled with the viral success of Bini's previous single "Pantropiko" on TikTok, "Salamin, Salamin" and Talaarawan led the girl group to become Spotify's highest-streamed OPM female artist, as well as the Filipino P-pop group with the most monthly listeners on the platform.

"Salamin, Salamin" entered the Billboard Philippines Songs chart at number 10 on the issue of April 20, 2024. This, along with "Pantropiko" reaching a new peak of number five, made Bini both the first P-pop group to have multiple entries on the chart and the first P-pop group to have entries within the top 10. Three months after its release, "Salamin, Salamin" peaked at the top of the chart on the issue of June 8, dethroning the previous week's chart-topper "Pantropiko" and scoring the girl group their second Billboard number one hit.

In December, "Salamin Salamin" was recognized as the top music video of 2024 on YouTube in the Philippines, with its lyrics video placing eighth. That same year, Google ranked it as the seventh most searched song in the country. The track was also featured in Billboard Philippines' list of The 50 Best Songs of 2024 and The 50 Best Music Videos of 2024.

At the inauguration of The Official Philippines Chart on February 19, 2025, "Salamin, Salamin" was recognized as its top four Local Song of the Year.

== Adaptations ==
A parody of the song, titled "Salarin, Salarin" (Culprit, Culprit), was released on the comedy show Bubble Gang on September 29, 2024.

== Charts ==
=== Weekly charts ===
Chart (2024)	Peak position
Philippines (Billboard)	1
Philippines Hot 100 (Billboard Philippines)	2
Philippines Top Songs (Billboard Philippines)	2

=== Monthly charts ===
Chart (2025)	Peak position
Philippines (Top P-pop Songs)	6

=== Year-end charts ===
Chart (2024)	Peak position
Philippines (Philippines Hot 100)	4
Philippines (Top Philippine Songs)	4

== Accolades ==
Awards and nominations received by Bini
Award	Year	Category	Result	Ref.
Awit Awards	2025	Best Dance/Electronic Recording	Won	
Awit Awards	2025	Music Video of the Year	Nominated	
Myx Music Awards	2024	Pop Video of the Year	Won	
P-pop Music Awards	2024	Song of the Year	Nominated	
P-pop Music Awards	2024	Music Video of the Year	Won	
P-pop Music Awards	2024	Production Design in a Music Video	Won	
PMPC Star Awards for Music	2026	Song of the Year	Nominated	
PMPC Star Awards for Music	2026	Music Video of the Year	Nominated	
PMPC Star Awards for Music	2026	Dance Recording of the Year	Won	
VP Choice Awards	2025	P-pop Song of the Year	Won	

== Listicles ==
Name of publisher, year listed, name of listicle, and placement
Publisher	Year	Listicle	Placement	Ref.
Billboard Philippines	2024	The 50 Best Music Videos of 2024	Placed	
Billboard Philippines	2024	The 50 Best Songs of 2024	Placed	
Billboard Philippines	2025	9 OPM Songs we'd Love to See Translated into The Sims' Simlish Language	Placed	
SunStar Davao	2024	Tatak Noypi (Note: lit. 'Mark of a Filipino', Noypi is a slang term derived from reversing syllables of Pinoy, an informal word for Filipino.): 10 OPM Songs that Defined 2024	Placed	
