= ComicCon Asia =

Fan convention in the Philippines

ComicCon Asia was a comic book fan convention held in Metro Manila, Philippines, that featured in anime, comics, gaming, cosplay, TV shows, and movies. The convention held its inauguration on March 24–25, 2018, at SMX Convention Center Manila in Pasay.

== Organization ==
The event was planned by Pauline Laping of PSL Entertainment Production, who is also the CEO and director of Miss Global Philippines, together with Nam Entertainment Group.

== Events ==
Like most comic-book conventions, ComicCon Asia featured a large floor-space for exhibitors.

== History ==
=== 2018 ===
The convention was held on March 24–25, 2018, at SMX Convention Center Manila in Pasay. Eight Division world champion and Senator Manny Pacquiao served as event ambassador. Legendary comic book writer and artist Stan Lee was scheduled to attend but had to cancel citing health reasons. Hollywood actress Hayley Atwell was also set to appear but canceled on the last minute due to conflict with her schedule. Walter Jones, who played the original Black Ranger, Zachary "Zack" Taylor and Dacre Montgomery were the international guests.

The event also featured local talents such as musician Yael Yuzon, comic book artists Harvey Tolibao, Carlo Pagulayan, and Ian Sta. Maria, and Armand Serrano of Walt Disney Animation Studios. World renowned cosplayers Chad Hoku (Hoku props), Linda Le (Vampy Bit Me), Nana Kuronoma and Anna Redie (Enji Night) were in attendance.

== Controversy ==
The inaugural convention received negative reviews from fans as they complained about long lines, less comic book oriented booths, problems with refunds and controversial guests.

=== Involvement of Manny Pacquiao ===
It was initially thought that Manny Pacquiao was funding the event which caused mixed reception especially fans from the Philippines in which they viewed it as another attempt by the boxer to enter a different profession. It also drew criticism from the LGBT community due to Pacquiao's stance on same-sex marriage with DC Comics' writer and inker Gerry Alanguilan to boycott the convention as it may be used as an outlet to promote his views. The organizer later released a statement that Pacquiao is not funding the event and they tapped the boxer because of his designation as the Philippines’ tourism ambassador.

=== Hayley Atwell's cancellation ===
Commicon Asia drew flak from fans after they stated that Actress Hayley Atwell cancelled her planned appearance due to political unrest in the country in which it drew criticism from the Philippine government. Atwell however posted on her Instagram account dismissing the statement and said the cancellation was due to conflicting schedule.

=== Problems with refunds ===
Many fans were not pleased that it took ComicCon Asia a week to address the refunds after Stan Lee and Hayley Atwell's cancellation. Criticism were also drawn when the online processing fees were not refundable. Another issue were the long lines for those seeking refunds.
