= Vvink =

Filipino girl group

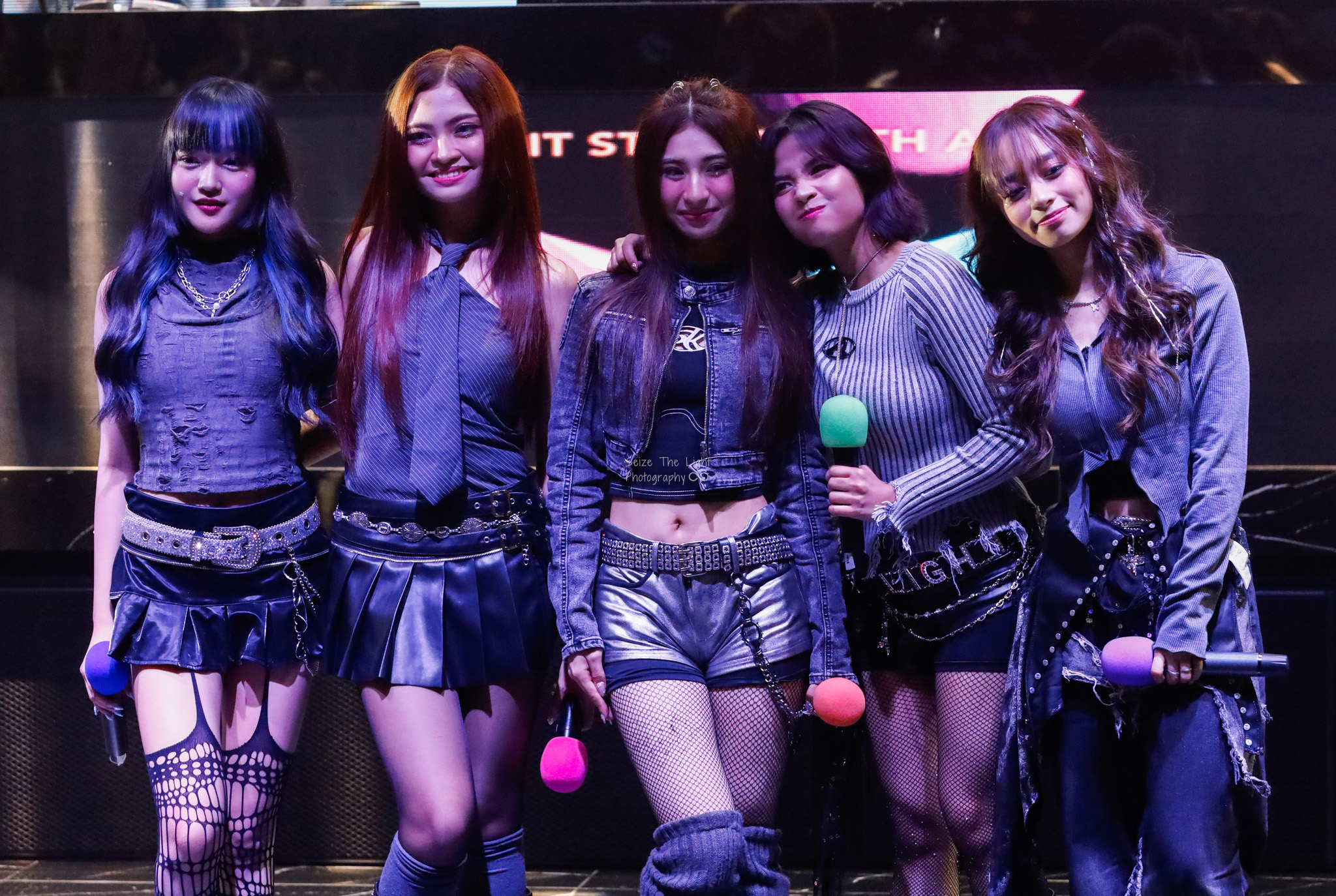
- Vvink in 2025 (left to right): Jean, Angelika, Ayaka, Odri, and Mariel

Background information
- Origin: Quezon City, Philippines
- Genre: P-pop
- Years active: 2025–present
- Label: FlipMusic Records
- Members: Angelika; Ayaka; Jean; Mariel; Odri
- Website: Official website

Vvink (pronounced as "wink"; stylized as all caps) is a Filipino girl group under FlipMusic Records. The group composed of five members: Angelika, Ayaka, Jean, Mariel, and Odri.

Vvink released their first album, Vvink: The Pre-Debut Album, on May 16, 2025. They officially debuted on July 10, 2025, at Club Hype in Tomas Morato, Quezon City, with single "Tulala" (transl. Stunned). They released their second single "Tatlong Hiling" (transl. Three Wishes). Their third, "Baduy" (transl. Cheesy), will be released on November 14. It is a hyperpop song incorporating budots.

== Name ==
The group's name, is derived from the stylization of a double "V" read as "W", forming the word "wink". The name symbolizes themes of the second chances and double victory. The symbol has been described as representing a link between past experiences and future aspirations, encouraging reflection on one's journey while moving forward with confidence.

== History ==
=== Pre-debut ===
FlipMusic formed the girl group with members Angelika, Ayaka, Jean, Mariel, and Odri. Prior to joining the group, Odri had no professional singing experience but had worked as a dancer for several years. Angelika was involved with FlipMusic as a songwriter after the label's head producer Jumbo de Belen; one of her earliest writing Bini popular single, "Pantropiko" (lit. 'Tropical'). Ayaka, a former child star actress of Filipino and Japanese descent, had returned to Japan after her acting career in the Philippines. Mariel previously competed on The Voice Kids Philippines, while Jean and Mariel reportedly connected through social media before joining the group. FlipMusic CEO Jeli Mateo stated that the group concept was to bring together individuals "who were not given the chance to be 'winners', but who [the team] believed had so much potential and what it takes to become great together." On May 16, the group released Vvink: The Pre-Debut Album, which featured two solo tracks from each member. It was designed to highlight their individual artistic styles ahead of their official group debut. Their vocal coach is Pow Chavez.

=== 2025-present: Debut, more singles ===
On July 10, 2025, Vvink officially debuted at Club Hype in Tomas Morato, Quezon City, with the release of their debut single "Tulala" (transl. stunned). The song described as a dreamy and upbeat track that explores the whirlwind of emotions associated with first love, a theme that resonates with younger audiences. The group teased their second single "Tatlong Hiling" (transl. Three Wishes) on August 25, releasing the song on all streaming platforms on October 15. A month later, they also began teasing their third single "Baduy" (transl. Cheesy), which has been described as a hyperpop track that incorporates budots. The song will be released on November 14.

In August 2026, the group, along with Wrive Russu, are some of the artists announced to be participating in the Philippine Selection Night, the national selection for the Eurovision Song Contest Asia 2026, wtith the song “Round ‘n Round”, composed by Julius James de Belén and John Michael Conchada.

== Members ==
- Angelika Sam
- Ayaka Takakuwa
- Jean Flores
- Audrey "Odri" Toledo
- Beatrice Mariel Ong

== Discography ==
=== Studio albums ===
List of studio albums
Title	Album details	Ref.
Vvink: The Pre-Debut Album	Released: May 16, 2025; Label: FlipMusic; Formats: digital download, streaming	
It Starts With a Wink	Released: May 29, 2026; Label: FlipMusic; Formats: digital download, streaming	

=== Singles ===
List of singles, showing year released, selected chart positions, and associated albums
Title	Year	Peak chart positions	Album	Ref.
Title	Year	PHL (Note: Peak chart positions for songs on the Philippines Hot 100 charts)	Album	Ref.
"Tulala"	2025	—	It Starts With a Wink	
"Tatlong Hiling"	2025	—	It Starts With a Wink	
"Baduy" (with DJ Love) (featuring Pio Balbuena)	2025	—	It Starts With a Wink	
"Kailagan Ka Aamin"	2026	—	It Starts With a Wink	
"Pag-ibig Fun"	2026	—	It Starts With a Wink	
"Trisikulo" (with Ziv)	2026			
"Mic Check Mic Check (Alam Mo Na Yan)"	2026			

== Awards and nominations ==
Award(s)	Year	Category	Nominated work	Result	Refs.
P-pop Awards	2025	New Group Artist of the Year	Vvink	Won	
Aliw Award	2025	New Group of the Year	Vvink	Won	
Filipino Music Awards	2026	Pop Song of the Year	"Baduy"	Won	
