= I Feel Good (Bini song) =

Single by Bini

from the album Feel Good
- Language: Tagalog; English
- Released: September 22, 2022
- Genre: Bubblegum pop; funk
- Length: 3:48
- Label: Star
- Composers: John Michael Conchada; Julius James "Jumbo" De Belen
- Producer: Bojam

Bini singles chronology
"Lagi" (2022)	"I Feel Good" (2022)	"Strings" (2022)

Music video
- "I Feel Good" on YouTube

"I Feel Good" is a song by the Filipino girl group Bini. Written and composed by John Michael Conchada and Julius James "Jumbo" De Belen (Note: He is also known as "Bojam".) and arranged by Julius James "Jumbo" De Belen. It was produced by Bojam. It was released on September 22, 2022, by Star Music, as the second pre-single for the second album, Feel Good. It is a bubblegum pop and funk track that captures the joy and happiness of being in love, making you feel like you're in paradise.

== Background and Release ==
After the release of the single "Lagi", Bini released a single, "I Feel Good" on September 22, 2022, a week before the album Feel Good was released.

== Composition ==
"I Feel Good"
A 20-second sample of "I Feel Good", where the chorus and the lyric can be heard.

"I Feel Good" is three minutes and forty-eight seconds long. It is a bubblegum pop and funk song. The song features metallophone accents. Bojam produced the song, with vocal arrangement, written and composed by John Michael Conchada and Jumbo De Belen. It is arranged by Jumbo De Belen. It was mixed and mastered by Mat Olavides and Jumbo De Belen. "I Feel Good" is a romantic song that captures the joy and happiness of being in love, making you feel like you're in paradise.

== Music video ==
The music video for "I Feel Good" features vibrant 1990s and early‑2000s fashion—complete with cropped tops, beaded necklaces, braided hairstyles, and colorful clips—showcasing a playful and nostalgic aesthetic that captured fans' attention upon release. The music video maintains a playful, carefree vibe. However, the ending teases a darker upcoming release, with the band hanging by strings as lifeless marionettes and dancing on clouds.

The video was produced by the YouMeUsMNL, directed by Amiel Kirby Balagtas, and written by Troi Bautista, Alanis Manantan.

== Live performances ==
In May 2023, Bini performed "I Feel Good" at the Star Magic All-Star Games, which were held at the Mall of Asia Arena in Bay City, Pasay.

In November, Bini also performed at BreakTudo Awards 2023, at the roof was The Fun Roof in Poblacion, Makati, where it was nominated for International New Artist Song and won.

== Accolades ==
Award	Year	Category	Recipient(s)	Result	Ref.
BreakTudo Awards	2023	International New Artist Song	"I Feel Good"	Won	

== Credits and personnel ==
Credits are adapted from Apple Music.

- Bini – vocals
- John Michael Conchada – songwriter, vocal arranger
- Julius James "Jumbo" De Belen – songwriter, vocal arranger, producer, mixing engineer, mastering engineer
- Mat Olavides – mixing engineer, mastering engineer
- Jonathan Manalo – executive producer

== Charts ==
Chart performance for "I Feel Good"
Chart (2024)	Peak position
Philippines (Philippines Hot 100)	63
