= G22 (Filipino group) =

Filipino girl group

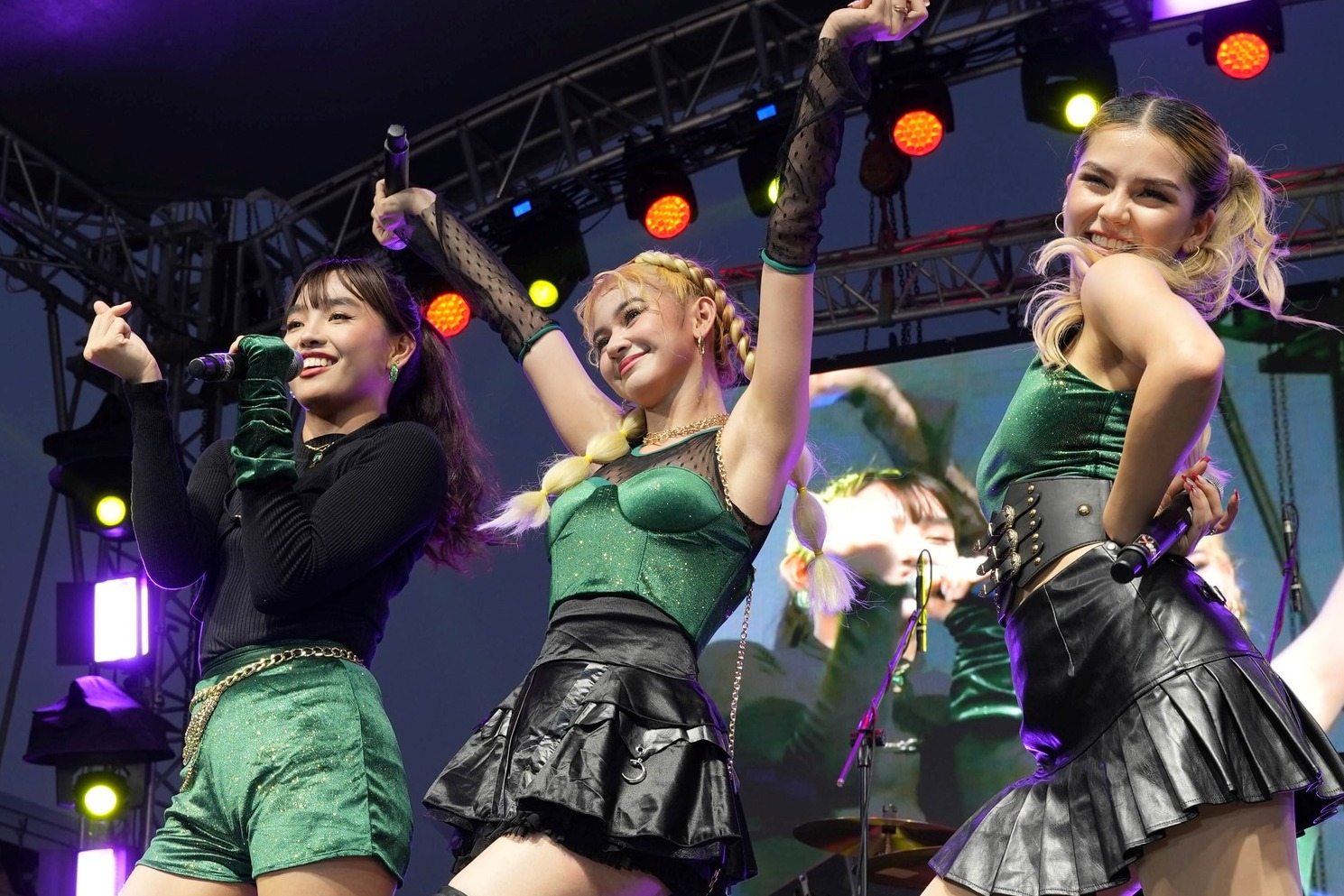
- G22 in 2023 (left to right): AJ, Alfea, Jaz

Background information
- Origin: Quezon City, Philippines
- Genres: P-pop; hip-hop; soft pop
- Years active: 2022–present
- Labels: Cornerstone; Republic (UMG)
- Members: AJ; Alfea; Jaz
- Past members: Bianca
- Website: Official website

G22 is a Filipino girl group formed in 2022 by Cornerstone Entertainment. Tagged as "P-pop's Female Alphas", the group is composed of three members: AJ, Alfea, and Jaz.

== History ==
=== 2022–2023: Formation and domestic success ===
In February 2022, Cornerstone Entertainment launched a Pinoy pop girl group originally composed of four members, AJ Yape, Alfea Zulueta, Bianca Forro, and Jaz Henry, The group name, G22, was derived from Glock 22, a semi-automatic pistol, which connected with the debut single, "Bang!". In April 2022, the group has made their first live performance at the inaugural PPOPCON held at the Araneta Coliseum as an opening act. In December 2022, the group released a single "Takin' Over" as the official theme song of Mutya ng Pilipinas 2022.

In September 2023, Cornerstone announced that Bianca would be leaving the group due to personal and family reasons.

Also in the same month, G22 released a rendition of Dionela's "Musika" as a trio after the departure of Bianca.

In November 2023, G22 released a single, "Loka", as the official theme song of the horror film, Shake, Rattle & Roll Extreme.

=== 2024–present: International guesting ===
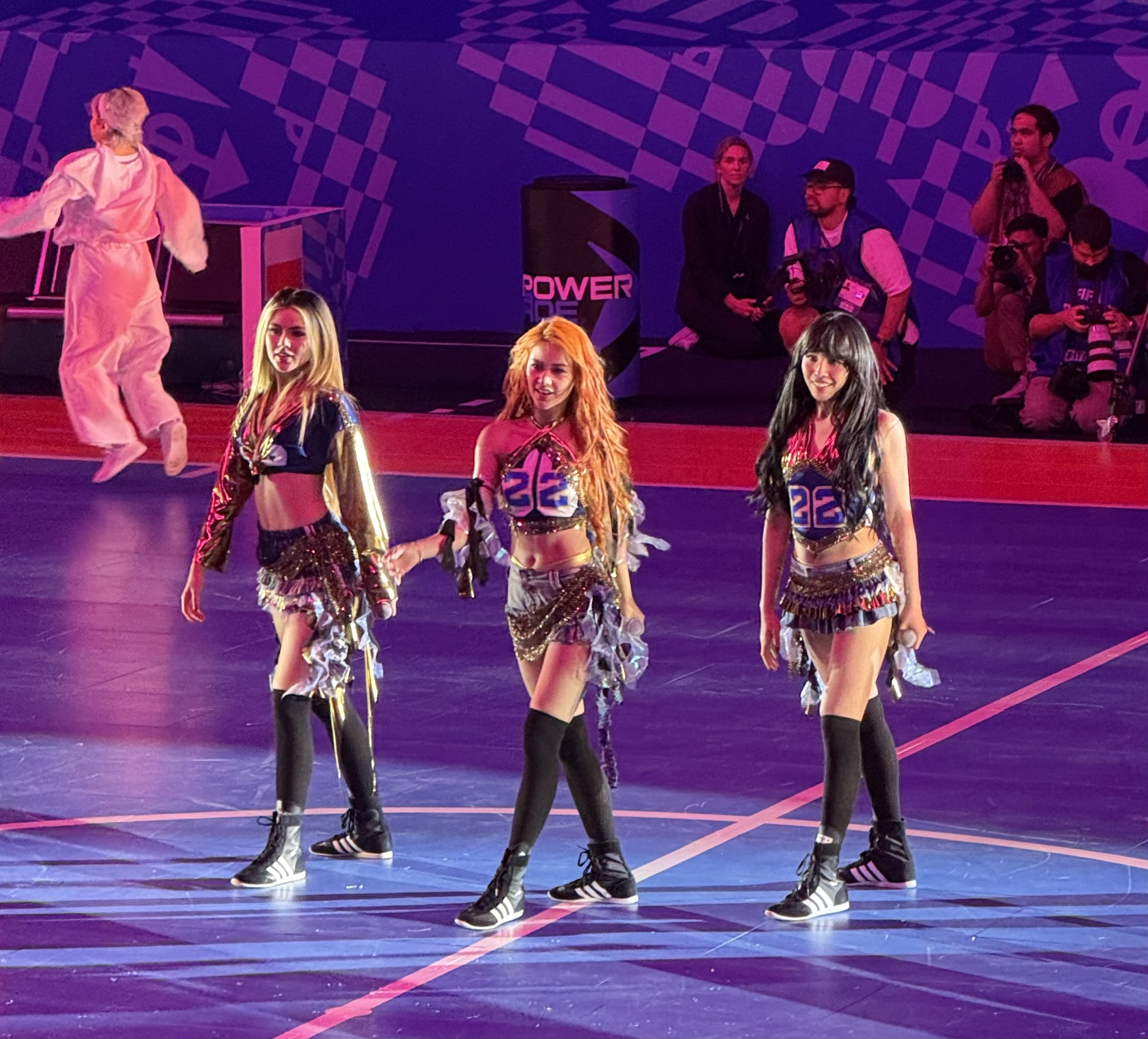
G22 performing at the 2025 FIFA Futsal Women's World Cup opening ceremony at the PhilSports Arena in Pasig

In April 2024, G22 guested the Chinese reality show Show It All hosted by Lay Zhang of Exo, showcasing performances of "Babalik" and "Boomerang" alongside fellow P-pop girl group Bini.

== Members ==
- AJ - leader, rapper & vocalist
- Alfea - vocalist & dancer
- Jaz - vocalist

== Discography ==
=== Studio albums ===
List of studio albums
Title	Album details	Ref.
The Dissection of Eve	Released: November 22, 2025; Label: Cornerstone Music; Formats: digital download, streaming	

=== Singles ===
List of singles showing year released and album name
Title	Year	Album	Label	Ref.
"Bang"	2022	Non-album single	CS Music	
"Babalik"	2022	Non-album single	CS Music	
"Defy"	2022	Non-album single	CS Music	
"Takin' Over"	2022	Non-album single	Republic Records Philippines (UMG Philippines)	
"Boomerang"	2023	Non-album single	Republic Records Philippines (UMG Philippines)	
"Musika"	2023	Non-album single	Republic Records Philippines (UMG Philippines)	
"Loka"	2023	Non-album single	Republic Records Philippines (UMG Philippines)	
"One Sided Love"	2024	Non-album single	Republic Records Philippines (UMG Philippines)	
"I Hate Boys"	2024	Non-album single	Republic Records Philippines (UMG Philippines)	
"Limitless"	2024	Non-album promotional single	Republic Records Philippines (UMG Philippines)	
"Pa-Pa-Pa-Palaban"	2025	The Dissection of Eve	Republic Records Philippines (UMG Philippines)	
"Filipina Queen"	2025	The Dissection of Eve	Republic Records Philippines (UMG Philippines)	
"Time In"	2026		Star Music	

== Concerts ==
Showcase
Event name	Dates	Venue	Location	Ref.
Locked and Loaded	February 25, 2024	Eton Centris	Quezon City	
Fantopia Summer Live	April 26, 2024 (Note: Cancelled due to the producer's failure to fulfill contract obligations)	Skydome, SM North EDSA	Quezon City	
2025 FIFA Futsal Women's World Cup opening ceremony	November 21, 2025	PhilSports Arena	Pasig	

Concert participations
Event name	Dates	Venue	Location	Ref.
2022 PPOPCON	April 10, 2022	Araneta Coliseum	Quezon City	
Tugatog: Filipino Music Festival	July 15, 2022	Mall of Asia Arena	Pasay	
POPstival 2022	October 21, 2022	CCP Complex	Pasay	
Enhypen: Fun Meet in Manila	December 3, 2022	Araneta Coliseum	Quezon City	
Kpop Overpass Concert	June 11, 2023	Araneta Coliseum	Quezon City	
2023 PPOPCON	July 16, 2023	Araneta Coliseum	Quezon City	
2023 FIBA Basketball World Cup Draw Festival	April 29, 2023	Uptown Mall	Taguig	
Truth Festival	August 20, 2023	Quezon Memorial Circle	Quezon City	
MassKara Festival 2023	October 19, 2023	Lacson Drive	Bacolod	
Sinulog Festival 2024	January 20–21, 2024	SRP Grounds	Cebu City	
Dinagyang Festival 2024	January 27–28, 2024	Valeria St.	Iloilo City	
Pride PH Festival 2024: Love Laban 2 Everyone (Note: Performance cancelled due to inclement weather)	June 22, 2024	Quezon Memorial Circle	Quezon City	

== Awards and nominations ==
Award(s)	Year	Category	Nominated work	Result	Refs.
TikTok Awards Philippines	2022	PPOP Group of the Year	G22	Nominated	
Asia Pinnacle Awards	2022	Rising P-pop Group of the Year	G22	Won	
Saludo Excellence Awards	2023	PPOP Group of the Year	G22	Won	
Nylon Manila Big Bold Brave Awards	2023	Favorite Rookie P-Pop Group	G22	Nominated	
PPOP Awards	2023	Top Female Visual of the Year	Alfea	Won	
BreakTudo Awards	2024	Song By An International Artist	"I Hate Boys"	Nominated	
Wish 107.5 Music Awards	2025	Wish Pop Song of the Year	"One Sided Love"	Nominated	

=== Listicles ===
Name of publisher, name of listicle, year listed, and placement result
Publisher	Listicle	Year	Result	Ref.
Billboard Philippines	P-pop Rising Class	2025	Placed	
