= Dessert Museum =

Selfie museum in Pasay, Philippines

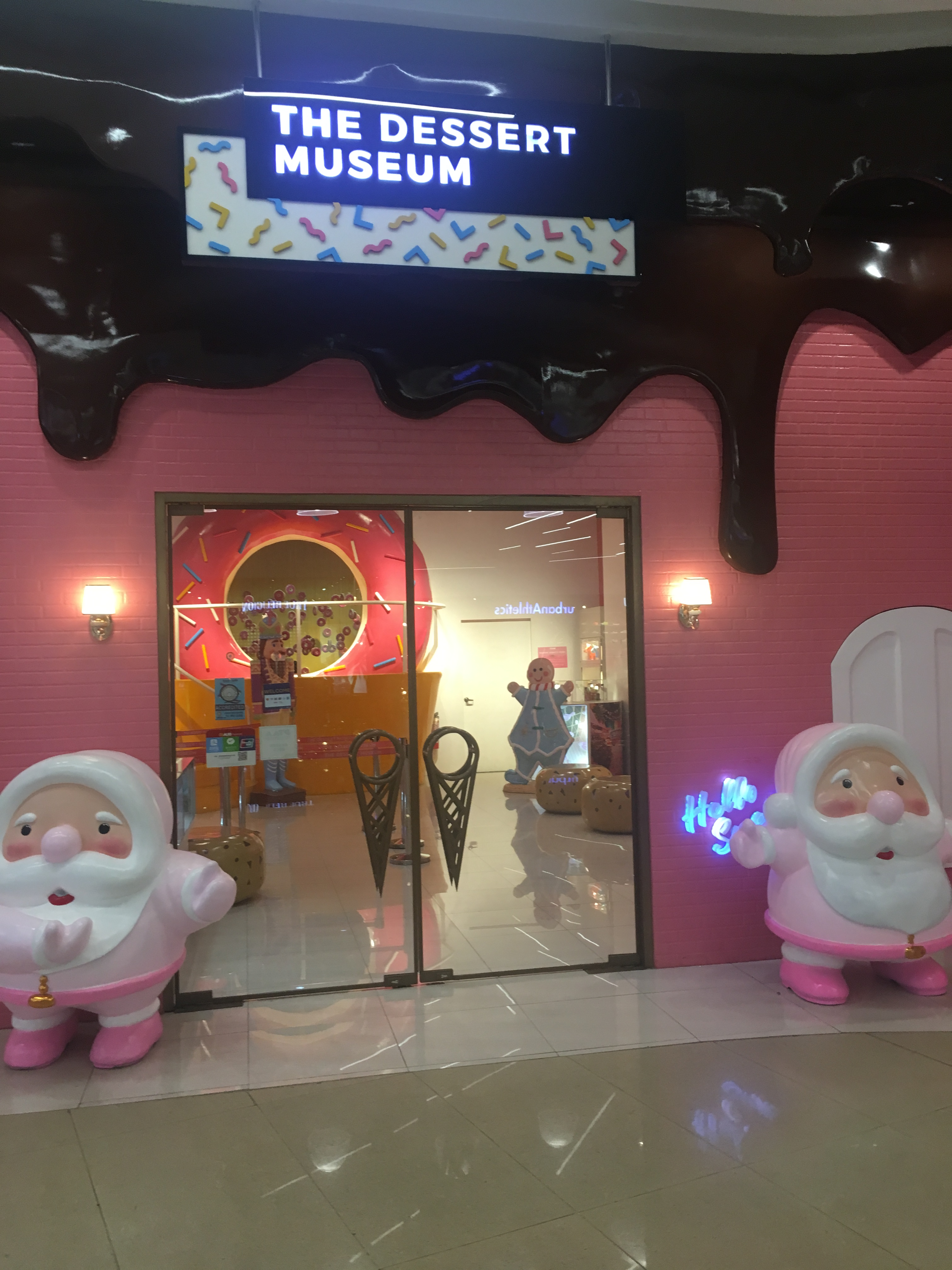
- Established: February 10, 2018; 8 years ago
- Location: Conrad Manila, Coral Way, Bay City, Pasay, Metro Manila, Philippines
- Coordinates: 14°31′53″N 120°58′50″E
- Type: Interactive art exhibition
- Website: www.thedessertmuseum.com

The Dessert Museum is an interactive art exhibition, or "selfie museum", described as a cross between a museum, theme park and candy shop, with dessert-themed art pieces and installations. Located in Pasay, Metro Manila in the Philippines at Conrad Manila within the SM Mall of Asia complex and inspired by similar exhibitions like the Museum of Ice Cream, it is the first exhibit of its kind in Asia.

== History ==
The mall re-opened in 2022, having different rooms.

== Features and reception ==
Inside, there are eight rooms. Each of the rooms represent a particular dessert. The first room shows donuts, the second shows marshmallows, and the rest features candy canes, ice cream, bubble gum, gummy bears, cotton candy, and cakes, respectively. Each room has its own guide, who shares information about the subject. Some desserts are served based on the current room. According to a blog, it was not actually a museum; more so a " playground-slash-photo-studio built for fun-loving, IG-dwelling kids." The blog mentioned that "some rooms are more fun than others."

== In popular culture ==
Pinoy pop group Bini featured the Dessert Museum as the setting of their music video for their hit song Lagi.
