= Karera (Bini song) =

2023 single by Bini

Single by Bini

from the EP Talaarawan
- Language: Tagalog
- English title: Race
- Released: September 22, 2023
- Genre: Bubblegum pop; dance-pop
- Length: 4:28
- Label: Star
- Songwriters: Nica Del Rosario; Jumbo De Belen; Jose Miguel Cortes; Maria Nicolette Vergara; Mikhaela Janna Lim; Stacey Aubrey Sevilleja
- Producers: Bojam; Jose Miguel Cortes

Bini singles chronology
"Strings" (2022)	"Karera" (2023)	"Pantropiko" (2023)

Music video
- "Karera" on YouTube

"Karera" (lit. 'Race') is a song recorded by the Filipino girl group Bini for their debut extended play (EP), Talaarawan (2024). The song was composed by Gianina Camille "Nica" Del Rosario, along with the producers, Julius James "Bojam" (Note: He is also known as "Bojam".) De Belen, and Jose Miguel Cortes, with its rap parts written by Bini members Colet, Mikha, and Stacey. On September 22, 2023, the song was released as a pre-release single by Star Music. A bubblegum pop and dance-pop track with disco influences, it addresses mental health by emphasizing the importance of self-care, and the need to slow down, as life is not a race.

"Karera" was acclaimed for its uplifting message and musical evolution. Kara Angan of Billboard Philippines praised the track for its fusion of bubblegum pop with J-pop-inspired production, highlighting the infectious melody and hook. She also regarded the song as one of the best P-pop releases of 2023, while Preen commended its self-care theme. The song's message of self-acceptance and personal growth resonated with many and led to its adoption as a graduation song in numerous schools and universities across the Philippines. The track also received two awards, one being People's Voice Favorite Music Video of the Year at the 2024 Awit Awards, where it earned three nominations, and the other, Wishclusive Pop Performance of the Year at the 2025 Wish Music Awards. Bini promoted the song through live performances on the Chinese reality show Show It All in April and May 2024 and at the Star Magic All-Star Games halftime show in June 2024.

== Background and release ==
In September 2022, Bini released its second album, Feel Good. The album accumulated over five million streams on Spotify, and its single "I Feel Good" earned the International New Artist Song award at the 2023 Breaktudo Awards. Originally pitched to a solo female artist, "Karera" was later picked up by Bini and was introduced as part of Bini's comeback on September 12, 2023, supported by various promotional materials such as individual video teasers, a music video trailer, and a dance choreo snippet.

Star Music released "Karera" on September 22, 2023, as the first pre-release single for their EP, with the music video premiering on the same day.

== Composition and lyrics ==
"Karera"
A 22-second sample of the song's hook, showcasing its message about slowing down and that life is not a race.

"Karera" is four minutes and twenty-eight seconds long. The track was composed by FlipMusic's (Note: FlipMusic is a Philippine production house founded by Jumbo "Bojam" De Belen.) Gianina Camille "Nica" Del Rosario, Julius James "Bojam" De Belen and Jose Miguel Cortes who produced the song. Musically, it has been described as bubblegum pop and disco-infused dance-pop. Bini members Colet, Mikha, and Stacey also contributed by writing its rap section.

Lyrically, "Karera" explores mental health, promoting self-care and encouraging listeners to slow down as life is not a race. Del Rosario, who has been diagnosed with Generalized Anxiety Disorder (GAD), drew from her personal experiences to shape the song's message. The track reflects a change in Bini's musical approach, presenting a new sound and theme centered on encouraging listeners to navigate life at their own pace and prioritize self-care.

== Reception ==
"Karera" was met with acclaim from critics for its message. Writing for Billboard Philippines, Kara Angan praised the track as a significant evolution of Bini's signature bubblegum pop sound, incorporating "twinkly" J-pop-inspired production. She noted the song's "killer melody and hook", declaring it "one of the best—if not the best—P-pop songs released this year [2023]". The magazine also listed the song in its 2024 listicle "15 Songs to Celebrate Your Graduation to". Andrea Posadas, writing for Preen magazine, commended "Karera" as an upbeat self-care anthem that encourages listeners to take a breather from life's chaos. She highlighted the song's message that life is a journey with room for exploration and growth, rather than a race. Posadas also praised Bini's dedication to their craft, noting that members Colet, Mikha, and Stacey contributed to the songwriting, resulting in a meticulously executed and whimsical concept.

The song also achieved commercial success, peaking at number seven and four in Billboard Philippines' Hot 100 and Top Philippine Songs charts, respectively. It also placed 20th and 13th on the year-end edition of the two charts, respectively. In January 2025, "Karera" reached 100 million streams on Spotify. Its theme led for it to become a graduation anthem in several schools and universities in the Philippines. Videos of performances during ceremonies, gained attention on social media. Ruru Pura, a teacher from Tagaytay City Science National High School-ISHS, noted that the song was chosen for its meaningful message, emphasizing that "life is not a race" and individuals have their own timelines. At the University of Santo Tomas, "Karera" was featured during a Baccalaureate Mass and pyromusical show.

=== Accolades ===
Awards and nominations for "Karera"Awards and nominations received by Bini
Award	Year (Note: Indicates the year of ceremony. Each year is linked to the article about the awards held that year, wherever possible.)	Category	Result	Ref.
Awit Awards	2024	Best Inspirational Recording	Nominated	
Awit Awards	2024	Best Music Video	Nominated	
Awit Awards	2024	People's Voice Favorite Music Video of the Year	Won	
Wish Music Awards	2025	Wishclusive Pop Performance of the Year	Won	

=== Listicles ===
Publisher	Year	Listicle	Placement	Ref.
Billboard Philippines	2024	15 Songs to Celebrate Your Graduation to	Placed	

== Promotion ==
Bini promoted "Karera" through various live performances. In 2024, the group performed the track along with their other songs "I Feel Good" and "Pantropiko" on the Chinese reality show Show It All, showcasing Filipino talent on an international platform. The performances were aired on April 25 and May 2. On June 3, Bini performed "Karera" at the Star Magic All-Star Games, which were held at the Araneta Coliseum in Quezon City as part of the halftime show.

== Credits and personnel ==
Credits are adapted from Apple Music.

- Bini – vocals
- Gianina Camille Del Rosario – songwriter
- Jose Miguel Cortes – songwriter, producer
- Julius James "Bojam" De Belen – songwriter, producer
- Ma. Nicolette Vergara – songwriter
- Mikhaela Janna Lim – songwriter
- Stacey Aubrey Sevilleja – songwriter

== Charts ==
=== Weekly charts ===
Chart (2024)	Peak position
Philippines (Philippines Hot 100)	7
Philippines (Top Philippine Songs)	4

=== Monthly charts ===
Chart (2025)	Peak position
Philippines (Top P-pop Songs)	10

=== Year-end charts ===
Chart (2024)	Peak position
Philippines (Philippines Hot 100)	20
Philippines (Top Philippine Songs)	13
