= Conrad Manila =

Hotel in Pasay, Metro Manila, Philippines

- The hotel in June 2016
- Interactive map of the Conrad Manila area

General information
- Status: Completed
- Location: Seaside Boulevard, Bay City, Pasay, Metro Manila, Philippines
- Coordinates: 14°31′54.8″N 120°58′49.6″E
- Opening: June 15, 2016; 10 years ago
- Cost: ₱6.5 billion
- Owner: SM Hotels and Conventions Corporation
- Operator: Conrad Hotels

Technical details
- Floor count: 10 above ground (including S Maison) + 1 basement

Design and construction
- Architecture firm: WOW Architects
- Other designers: Malherbe (interior design; S Maison)

Other information
- Number of rooms: 347 (including suites)
- Number of restaurants: 5
- Parking: 1 floor (basement level)

Website
- Official Website

Conrad Manila is a 5-star hotel located at the Bay City area in Pasay, Metro Manila, Philippines. The hotel, which is under the Hilton Worldwide corporation, serves as the first Conrad-branded hotel in the country.

== Design and construction ==
The design of the building occupied by the Conrad Manila was inspired by the cruise ships passing by Manila Bay. Conrad Manila was designed by WOW Architects. The firm was also responsible for the interior design of the building.

On March 7, 2013, SM Hotels and Conventions Corporation announced that they reached an agreement with Hilton Worldwide, the operator of the Conrad Hotels hotel brand, that the SM subsidiary would manage Conrad Manila. The opening of the hotel, then planned to have 350 rooms, was initially scheduled for mid-2015. It was later reported that Hilton Worldwide would manage Conrad Manila, which would be owned by the SM subsidiary.

The hotel opened on June 15, 2016, and was marked with a ribbon-cutting ceremony. However, the formal opening of the hotel was scheduled in September 2016. It is estimated that ₱6.5 billion was spent for the construction of the hotel building.

== Features ==
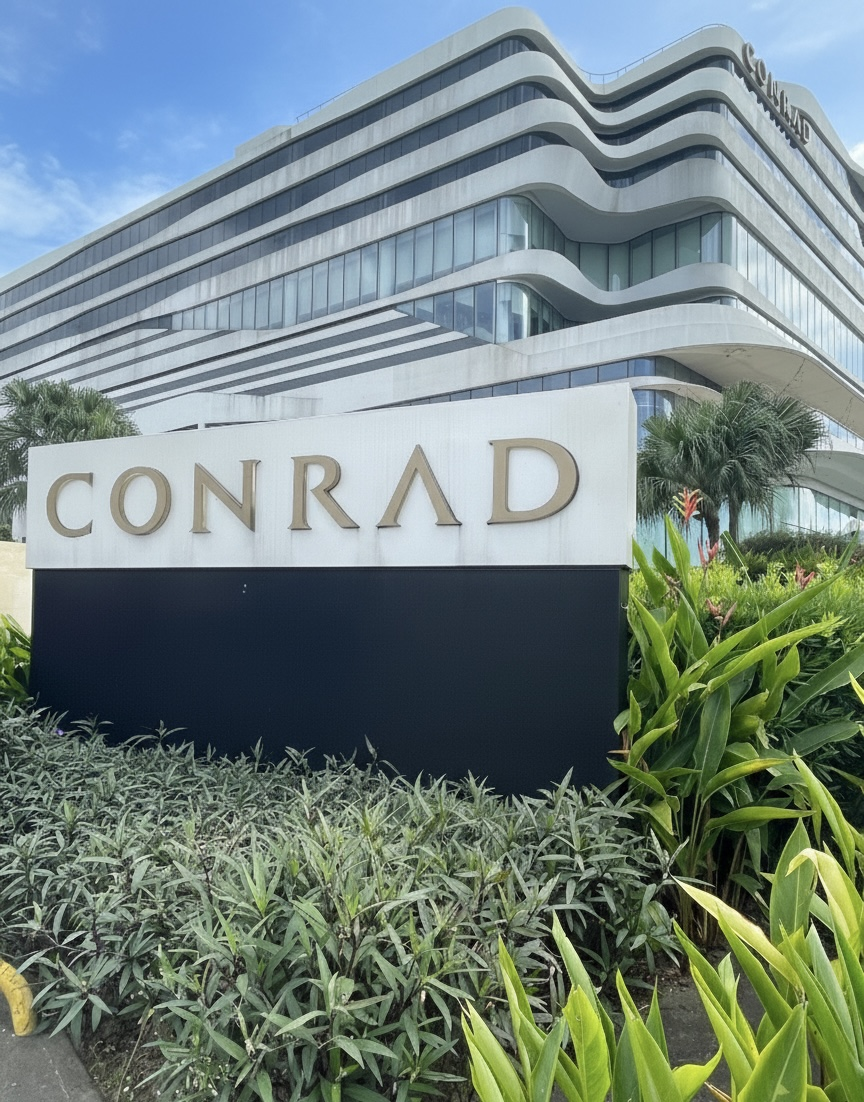
The Conrad Manila Logo viewed from the sidewalk (February 2026)

The hotel occupies the top eight floors of the building while the first two floors are occupied by S Maison, a retail complex. A one-floor basement parking is also found below S Maison and is accessible through Ocean Drive, with an exit at Coral Way. Two direct walkways connect the hotel building to the SMX Convention Center Manila. The hotel is owned by SM Hotels and Conventions Corporation, a subsidiary of SM Investments Corporation, while it is managed by the Hilton Worldwide as part of its Conrad Hotels brand.

At the time the hotel opened, there were 347 rooms and suites. The hotel hosts one outdoor venue, named the Artpark; four event halls, named the Harrison, Murphy, Roosevelt, and Boardroom; and two ballrooms, named the Taft and Forbes ballrooms, which has the capacity of 1,000 people and 500 people respectively, and occupies a total of 2,106 square meters (22,670 sq ft). Five restaurants and lounges are likewise hosted at the hotel, namely the China Blue By Jereme Leung, Brasserie On 3, C Lounge, Bru Coffee Bar, and the Sails Pool Bar. A fitness center and spa operating around the clock and an infinity pool are also among the hotel's features.

=== S Maison ===
The S Maison (or S'Maison) retail space occupies the first two floors of the Conrad Manila, hosting 69 retail spaces. It also hosts a Director's Club Cinema with three theaters, each having a seating capacity of 38 people, installed by La-Z-Boy. The retail space was launched and opened in June 2017, and serves as the upscale mall within the SM Mall of Asia complex.

Malherbe, a French design firm, was responsible for the interior design of the S Maison, which is described as patterned after the concept of "Pearl of the Orient", with iridescent shell-based interiors and dapple light streams based from abstract leaves and twigs were placed on the mall's ceilings, while the mall's main lobby features black clam-based hanging decorations and the mall's seating areas were inspired from pearls from clams. The mall has an area of 25,534 square meters (274,850 sq ft). The tenant mix of the S Maison is described as "43 percent food and 57 percent retail". Tenants include Hard Rock Cafe Manila, Starbucks Reserve, museums such as the Dessert Museum, and various art galleries and exhibits.

==== Dessert Museum ====
The Dessert Museum has eight rooms which focuses on sweets and desserts and a souvenir shop inside. It is located on the ground floor of S Maison.

==== Space & Time Cube+ ====
Space & Time Cube+ is an immersive art museum with 20 themed attractions, such as the sensory games room, LED tunnels, and holographic exhibits. It is also located on the ground floor of S Maison. It had a soft opening on June 1, 2024, and officially opened on July 14 as the first immersive art museum outside of China.

=== Former attractions ===
==== Lakbay Museo ====
Lakbay Museo was an "interactive millennial museum" at the Conrad Manila and was considered as its first kind in the Philippines. Opened on July 12, 2019, it had art installations and 14 unique experiences from 11 different destinations around Luzon, Visayas and Mindanao. It also had a souvenir shop where visitors can buy pasalubong from different provinces of the Philippines. It was also located at the ground floor of S Maison. The museum was closed by the end of July 2022 and later moved the museum to the Ayala Malls Manila Bay, which opened its doors in September 2022.

== Reception ==
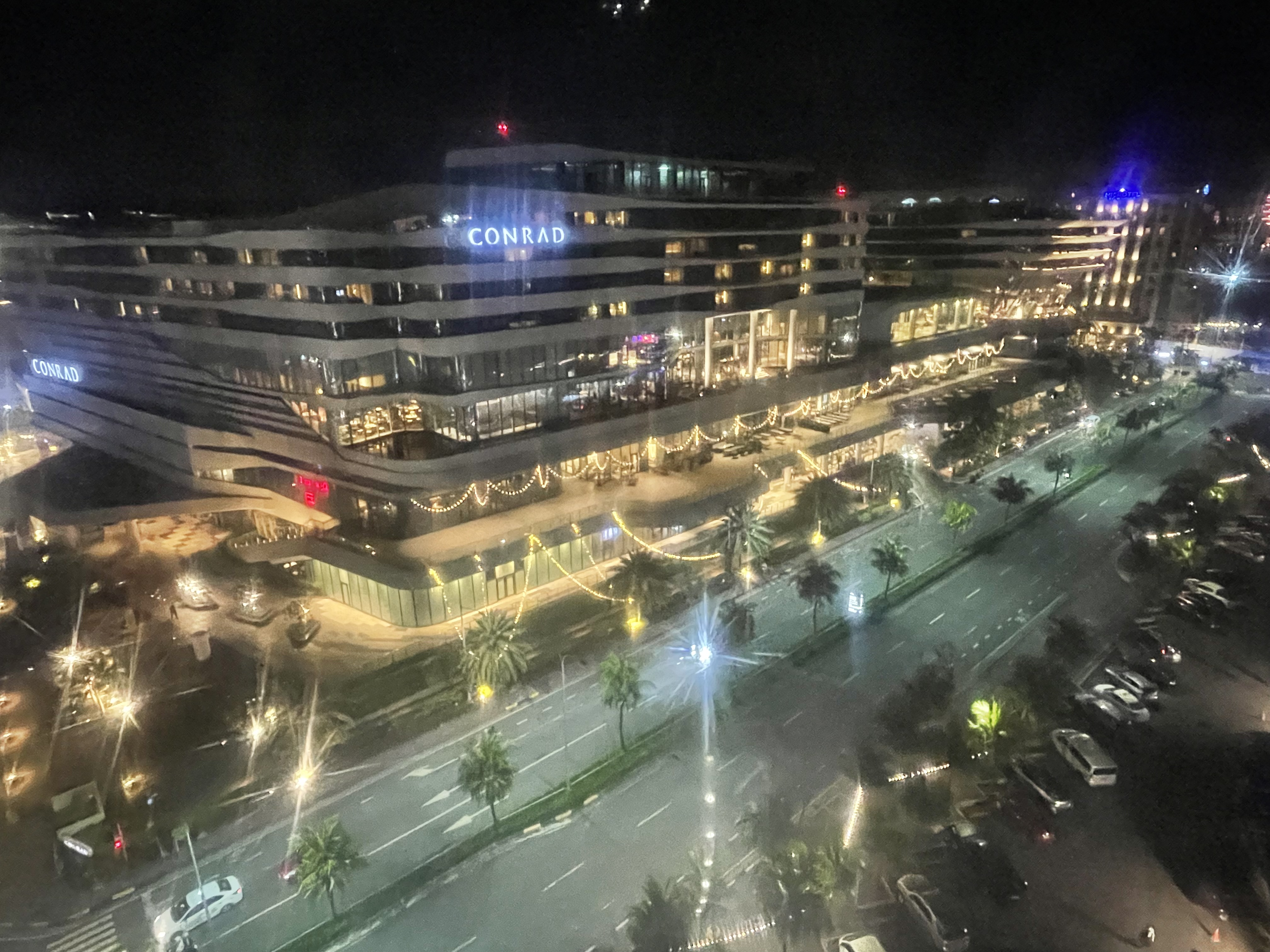
Night view of Conrad Manila in 2026

Prior to its opening date, the Conrad Manila was awarded at the 4th Annual Philippine Property Awards in April 2016. The establishment is the recipient of three awards, namely Best Hotel Development, Best Hotel Architectural Design, and Best Hotel Interior Design.

At the 2017 Prix Versailles World Architecture Awards held at the UNESCO Headquarters in Paris, the S Maison was recognized for design excellence in the Interior Spaces, South Asia and the Pacific Shopping Malls category.

Preceded by SM CDO Downtown	62nd SM Supermall; 2017	Succeeded by SM Cherry Antipolo
