= List of international prime ministerial trips made by Lawrence Wong =

This is a list of international prime ministerial trips made by Lawrence Wong, the 4th Prime Minister of Singapore.

Prime Minister Lawrence Wong, who took the office of Prime Minister of Singapore on 15 May 2024, made his first prime ministerial trip to meet with his counter-part Sultan of Brunei, Hassanal Bolkiah on 11 June 2024 at Bandar Seri Begawan. As of October 2026, Wong has made 29 international trips to 23 countries since becoming prime minister.

By convention, the Prime Minister of Singapore does not usually attend the UN General Assembly or the COP Summits and instead is represented by the Minister for Foreign Affairs and Minister for Sustainability and the Environment respectively.

Singapore is not an official member of G20; however, it has been regularly invited to all G20 summits from 2010, with the exception of the 2012 Summit.

== Summary ==
The number of visits per country where Prime Minister Wong traveled are:

- One: Australia, Brazil, Cambodia, Ethiopia, India, Japan, Laos, New Zealand, Peru, Qatar, Russia, Samoa, South Africa, South Korea, Timor-Leste, United Arab Emirates, and Vietnam
- Two: Brunei, China, and Thailand
- Three: Indonesia and the Philippines
- Five: Malaysia

World map highlighting countries visited by Lawrence Wrong during his prime ministership, as of November 2026. One visit Two visits Three visits Four visits Five visits Six visits Seven or more visits Singapore

== 2024 ==
| # | Country | Areas visited | Dates | Details |
|---|---|---|---|---|
| 1 | Brunei | Bandar Seri Begawan | June 11 | Introductory visit to Brunei as prime minister. Met separately with Sultan of Brunei Hassanal Bolkiah and Senior Minister Al-Muhtadee Billah, as well as Paduka Seri Pengiran Anak Isteri Pengiran Anak Sarah. |
| 1 | Malaysia | Putrajaya | June 12 | Introductory visit to Malaysia as prime minister. Met with PM Anwar Ibrahim. |
| 2 | Laos | Vientiane | 9–12 October | Attended the 44th & 45th ASEAN Summits and related summits and made an introductory visit to Laos in his first ASEAN Summits as PM. Held a bilateral meeting with and was hosted to dinner by Prime Minister Sonexay Siphandone and called on Laos President and General Secretary of the Lao People's Revolutionary Party Thongloun Sisoulith. Held bilateral meetings with Malaysian Prime Minister Anwar Ibrahim, Vietnamese Prime Minister Pham Minh Chinh, Thailand Prime Minister Paetongtarn Shinawatra and Chinese Premier Li Qiang on the sidelines of the ASEAN Summits. |
| 3 | Indonesia | Jakarta | 20 October | Attended inauguration of Prabowo Subianto as president, offered personal congratulations. |
| 4 | Samoa | Apia | 23–26 October | Attended the Commonwealth Heads of Government Meeting (CHOGM) in Apia, Samoa, first CHOGM as prime minister. Held bilateral meetings with New Zealand Prime Minister Christopher Luxon, Samoa Prime Minister Fiame Naomi Mata’afa, Guyana President Mohamed Irfaan Ali, Papua New Guinea Prime Minister James Marape and British Prime Minister Keir Starmer. Attended a reception hosted by His Majesty King Charles for new Commonwealth Leaders. |
| 5 | Indonesia | Jakarta | 5–6 November | Introductory visit to Indonesia as prime minister. Met President Prabowo Subianto, Vice-President Gibran Rakabuming Raka, Speaker of the People’s Consultative Assembly (MPR) Ahmad Muzani and Regional Representative Council (DPD) Sultan Bachtair Najamudin. |
| 6 | Peru | Lima | 14–16 November | Attended the APEC Peru 2024 Summit, accompanied by Minister for Foreign Affairs Vivian Balakrishnan. Held bilateral meetings with Peru President Dina Boluarte, Chinese President & General Secretary of the Chinese Communist Party Xi Jinping, Australian Prime Minister Anthony Albanese, Hong Kong Chief Executive John Lee, New Zealand Prime Minister Christopher Luxon and Taiwan Representative Lin Hsin-i on the sidelines. |
| 6 | Brazil | Rio de Janeiro | 17–20 November | Attended the 2024 G20 Rio de Janeiro summit. Wong met with Vietnamese Prime Minister Pham Minh Chinh and announced the upgrade of bilateral relations to a "Comprehensive Strategic Partnership" from 2025. Wong met with German Chancellor Olaf Scholz, where both Scholz and Wong announced the upgrade of the Singapore-Germany relations to a Strategic Partnership. Wong also met European Commission President Ursula von der Leyen on the sidelines. Met with Egyptian President Abdel Fattah El-Sisi and thanked him for facilitating Singapore's aid to Gaze. Made a telephone call with President-elect Donald Trump on the sidelines and congratulated him on his election victory. Wong also joined other leaders at the launch of a "Declaration on Digital Public Infrastructure, Artificial Intelligence and Data Governance". |
| 7 | Thailand | Bangkok | 28 November | Introductory visit to Thailand as prime minister. Met with Prime Minister Paetongtarn Shinawatra. Invited her to visit Singapore in 2025 as part of the 60th year of bilateral relations. Met with King Vajiralongkorn and Queen Suthida before returning. |

== 2025 ==
| # | Country | Areas visited | Dates | Details |
|---|---|---|---|---|
| 8 | Malaysia | Putrajaya | 6–7 January | 11th Singapore-Malaysia Annual Leaders' Retreat. Hosted to dinner by Prime Minister Anwar Ibrahim and met Ibrahim Iskandar of Johor on the morning of 7 December. Attended an official welcome ceremony which was followed by a delegation meeting between both leaders and their delegations. Witnessed the exchange of several bilateral agreements and MOUs including on the Singapore-Malaysia Special Economic Zone |
| 9 | Vietnam | Hanoi | 25–26 March | Introductory Visit to Vietnam. Called on General Secretary of the Communist Party of Vietnam Tô Lâm and President Lương Cường, met Prime Minister Phạm Minh Chính and Chairman of the National Assembly Trần Thanh Mẫn. |
| 10 | Malaysia | Kuala Lumpur | 26–27 May | Visit to Malaysia for the 46th ASEAN Summit between ASEAN Leaders and the ASEAN-GCC-China and ASEAN-GCC Summits on May 27. |
| 11 | Philippines | Manila | June 4–5 | Introductory Visit to Philippines at the invitation of Philippine President Bongbong Marcos. Participated in a wreath-laying ceremony at Rizal Monument and was ceremonially welcomed at Malacanang Palace and called on President Marcos. Hosted to an Official Dinner by President Marcos. following their meeting. |
| 12 | China | Beijing, Tianjin | 22–26 June | Introductory visit to China as prime minister, at the invitation of Chinese Premier Li Qiang. Met with Chinese president Xi Jinping, Premier Li Qiang and chairman of the National People's Congress Zhao Leji. Attended the 'Annual Meeting of the New Champions', commonly known as Summer Davos. |
| 13 | Cambodia | Phnom Penh | 2 July | Introductory Visit to Cambodia. Met with Prime Minister Hun Manet, King Norodom Sihamoni, and others. |
| 14 | India | New Delhi | 2–4 September | Introductory Visit to India as prime minister, at the invitation of Narendra Modi. |
| 15 | Australia | Canberra & Sydney | 6–9 October | Introductory to Australia to commemorate the 60th year of Singapore-Australia relations. Participated in the 10th Singapore-Australia Leaders’ Meeting with Prime Minister Albanese and the signing of the Joint Declaration to launch CSP 2.0. Called on Governor-General Sam Mostyn and met Leader of the Opposition Sussan Ley, New South Wales Premier Chris Minns, senior business leaders, and held a dialogue at the Lowy Institute. Laid wreaths at the Australian War Memorial. |
| 15 | New Zealand | Auckland | 9–11 October | Introductory Visit to New Zealand as prime minister, coinciding with the 60th anniversary of the establishment of diplomatic relations with New Zealand. Participated in a delegation meeting with Prime Minister Luxon, and the signing of the Joint Vision Statement to launch the Singapore-New Zealand Comprehensive Strategic Partnership. Laid wreaths at the Auckland War Memorial Museum. |
| 16 | Malaysia | Kuala Lumpur | 26–28 October | Attended the 47th ASEAN Summit and related meetings in Malaysia from October 26 to 28. Met with Brazil President Lula da Silva, South Africa President Cyril Ramaphosa, President of the European Council António Costa, Thailand Prime Minister Anutin Charnvirakul, Vietnamese Prime Minister Pham Minh Chinh and Malaysia Prime Minister Anwar Ibrahim on the sidelines. |
| 17 | South Korea | Gyeongju, Seoul | 29 October – 2 November | Attended the 2025 South Korea APEC Summit in Gyeongju. Launched negotiations for a Green Economy Partnership Agreement with Chile President Gabriel Boric and New Zealand Prime Minister Christopher Luxon and held bilateral meetings on the sideline with Abu Dhabi Crown Prince Khaled bin Mohamed Al Nahyan, US Treasury Secretary Scott Bessent and Hong Kong Chief Executive John Lee. Official Visit to Republic of Korea at the invitation of President Lee Jae Myung from 1 to 2 November, attended a delegation meeting at the ROK President’s Yongsan Office. Joint Press Conference to launch the upgrade of ROK-Singapore relations to a Strategic Partnership (SP). President Lee hosted an official luncheon for Prime Minister Wong. Prime Minister Wong laid a wreath at the Seoul National Cemetery. He also met overseas Singaporeans based in the ROK over a reception in Seoul. |
| 18 | Brunei | Bandar Seri Begawan | 3–4 November | Visited Brunei for the 11th Singapore-Brunei Young Leaders' Programme, at the invitation of His Royal Highness Al-Muhtadee Billah, Crown Prince and Senior Minister at the Prime Minister’s Office of Negara Brunei Darussalam. Prime Minister Wong held audiences with His Majesty Sultan Hassanal Bolkiah, His Royal Highness Crown Prince Billah. Prime Minister Wong was also hosted to a lunch by His Majesty the Sultan and a Welcome Dinner by His Royal Highness Crown Prince Billah. Prime Minister Wong visited various health-related facilities in Jerudong. |
| 19 | South Africa | Johannesburg | 21–23 November | Attended the 2025 G20 Johannesburg summit from 22–23 November. |
| 19 | Ethiopia | Addis Ababa | 23–25 November | Official Visit to the Federal Democratic Republic of Ethiopia, at the invitation of Prime Minister Abiy Ahmed. |

== 2026 ==
| # | Country | Areas visited | Dates | Details |
|---|---|---|---|---|
| 20 | Malaysia | Kuala Lumpur | 20 February | Visit to Malaysia at the invitation of Prime Minister Anwar Ibrahim for a break fast meal. |
| 21 | Japan | Tokyo | 17–19 March | Introductory visit to Japan. |
| 22 | China | Hainan, Hong Kong | 25–28 March | Working visit to China for the 2026 Bo'ao Forum for Asia (BFA) Annual Conference and Hong Kong. |
| 23 | Philippines | Cebu City | 7–9 May | Visit to the Philippines for the 48th ASEAN Summit and Related Meetings. |
| 24 | Russia | Kazan | 17–18 June | Visit to Russia for the ASEAN-Russia Commemorative Summit. |
| 25 | Timor-Leste | Dili | 2-3 July | Official Visit to Timor-Leste, reciprocating Timor-Leste Prime Minister Xanana Gusmão’s Official Visit to Singapore in July 2025. |
| 26 | Indonesia | Jakarta | 8 July | Official visit to Indonesia in for the 9th Singapore-Indonesia Annual Leaders’ Retreat. |
| 27 | Thailand | Bangkok | 2 September | Working Visit to Thailand for first Leaders' Retreat in 11 years. Met with Prime Minister Anutin Charnvirakul. |
| 28 | Qatar | Doha | 18–20 October | Official visit to Qatar as Prime Minister. Met Emir of Qatar Tamim bin Hamad Al Thani and Prime Minister and Minister for Foreign Affairs Mohammed bin Abdulrahman bin Jassim Al Thani and co-chaired the ninth Qatar-Singapore High-Level Joint Committee (HLJC). |
| 28 | United Arab Emirates | Abu Dhabi, Dubai | 20–22 October | Official visit to UAE as Prime Minister. Met President of the United Arab Emirates and Ruler of Abu Dhabi Mohamed bin Zayed Al Nahyan, Crown Prince and Chairman of the Abu Dhabi Executive Council Khaled bin Mohamed Al Nahyan and Deputy Prime Minister, Minister of Finance and Ruler of Dubai Maktoum bin Mohammed Al Maktoum. |
| 29 | Philippines | Manila, Pasay | 14–18 November | Visit to the Philippines for the 49th ASEAN Summit and related meetings as the Philippines turns over the ASEAN chairmanship to Singapore for 2027. |
| 29 | China | Shenzhen | 18–19 November | Visit to China for the 2026 APEC Summit in China. |

== Future trips ==
| Country | Areas to visit | Dates | Details |
|---|---|---|---|
| Malaysia | Putrajaya | TBC, 2026 | Expected to visit Malaysia in 2026 for the 13th Singapore-Malaysia Annual Leaders' Retreat. |
| United States | Doral | 14–15 December 2026 | Expected Attendance at the 2026 G20 Miami summit. |
| Vietnam | Phú Quốc | TBC, 2027 | Expected Attendance for the 2027 APEC Summit in Vietnam. |

== Multilateral meetings ==
Multilateral meetings of the following intergovernmental organizations that Singapore is a member of (or invited to) are scheduled to take place during Wong's term in office.

| Group | Year | | | | | | |
| Group | 2024 | 2025 | 2026 | 2027 | 2028 | 2029 | 2030 |
|---|---|---|---|---|---|---|---|
| APEC | 14–16 November (Peru) Lima | 31 October – 1 November (South Korea) Gyeongju | 18–19 November (China) Shenzhen | TBC (Vietnam) Phú Quốc | TBC (Mexico) | TBC | TBC; Singapore |
| ASEAN | 9 October (Laos) Vientiane | 26–28 October (Malaysia) Kuala Lumpur | 16-18 November (Philippines) Manila | TBC; Singapore | TBC (Thailand) | TBC (Timor-Leste) | TBC (Vietnam) |
| East Asia Summit | 11 October (Laos) Vientiane | 26–28 October (Malaysia) Kuala Lumpur | 18 November (Philippines) Manila | TBC; Singapore | TBC (Thailand) | TBC (Timor-Leste) | TBC (Vietnam) |
| G20 | 17–20 November (Brazil) Rio de Janeiro | 22–23 November (South Africa) Johannesburg | 14–15 December (United States) Doral | TBC (United Kingdom) London | TBC (South Korea) | | |
| CHOGM | 23–26 October (Samoa) Apia | None | 1–4 November (Antigua and Barbuda) Saint John’s | None | TBC | None | TBC |
| UNCCC | 11–22 November ^{[a]} (Azerbaijan) Baku | 10—21 November ^{[a]} (Brazil) Belém | 9-20 November ^{[a]} (Turkey) Antalya | TBC ^{[a]} (Ethiopia) Addis Ababa | | | |
| UNGA | 19–28 September^{[b]} (United States) New York City | 22–27 September ^{[b]} (United States) New York City | 22-28 September ^{[b]} (United States) New York City | TBC ^{[b]} (United States) New York City | TBC ^{[b]} (United States) New York City | TBC ^{[b]} (United States) New York City | TBC ^{[b]} (United States) New York City |
| Others | Ukraine peace summit 15–16 June^{[c]} (Switzerland) Nidwalden | | ASEAN-Russia Commemorative Summit 17–18 June (Russia) Kazan | | | | |
██ = Did not attend; ██ = Future event^aMinister for Sustainability and the Environment Grace Fu attends in Prime Minister Wong's place.^bMinister for Foreign Affairs Vivian Balakrishnan attends in Prime Minister Wong's place.^c Senior Minister of State for Foreign Affairs Sim Ann attended the summit as Special Envoy of the Prime Minister
