= Tulala =

Single by Vvink
- Language: Tagalog
- English title: Stunned
- Released: July 10, 2025
- Genre: Bubblegum pop; pop
- Length: 3:26
- Label: FlipMusic Records
- Songwriters: Julius James De Belen; John Michael Conchada
- Producer: Bojam

Vvink singles chronology
"Tulala" (2025)	"Tatlong Hiling" (2025)

"Tulala" (transl. Stunned) is the debut single by the Filipino girl group Vvink. Released on July 10, 2025, through FlipMusic Records, it was written by Julius James De Belen and John Michael Conchada and produced by Bojam. "Tulala" is a bubblegum pop track that explores the dreamy emotions of young love and drawing comparisons to the style popularized in the 2014 romantic comedy Diary ng Panget (lit. 'Diary of an Ugly Person').

== Background and release ==
In May 2025, Vvink released their pre-debut album Vvink: The Pre-Debut Album, which included the singles "Kalawakan" (transl. Space), "Ichigo Girl", "Palagi" (lit. 'Always'), and "Kindat" (lit. 'Wink').

The group officially debuted on July 11, 2025, in Tomas Morato, Quezon City with the single "Tulala".

== Composition ==
"Tulala" is three minutes and twenty-six seconds and incorporates upbeat bubblegum pop track characterized by bright synths, steady four on the floor percussion, and sharp guitar riffs. The track draws inspiration from the early 2010s local pop and hip-hop scene, reminiscent of the Diary ng Panget (lit. 'Diary of an Ugly Person') soundtrack. The girl group emphasizes a hook-driven structure but presents it with more refined production and performance, aiming for a contemporary sound rather than a nostalfic repeat. The song blends rap verses with melodic vocals to showcase the group's versatility and has been noted for its dreamy quality themes of love.

== Reception ==
Noelle Alarcon of The Flying Lugaw said that P-pop incorporates influences from the Hallyu Wave. He characterized FlipMusic's production style as drawing on K-pop's "a little bit of this, a little bit of that" approach, in which songs are presented as an auditory stage. Alarcon added that this method for the song continues trends found in the discographies of artists such as Nadine Lustre and Donnalyn Bartolome.

== Credits and personnel ==
Credits are adapted by Apple Music.

- Vvink – vocals
- Bojam – post-production engineer, producer
- Elian idioma – mastering engineer, mixing engineer
- Jellica Mateo – executive producer
- John Michael Conchada – songwriter, vocal arranger
- Julia Angulo – recording engineer
- Julius James De Belen – composer, electric guitar, executive producer, mixing engineer, mastering engineer, vocal arranger
- Mat Olavides – mixing engineer, mastering engineer
- Nolan Bernadino – executive producer
- Rap Sanchez – recording engineer
