= SMX Convention Center Manila =

Convention center in Pasay, Philippines

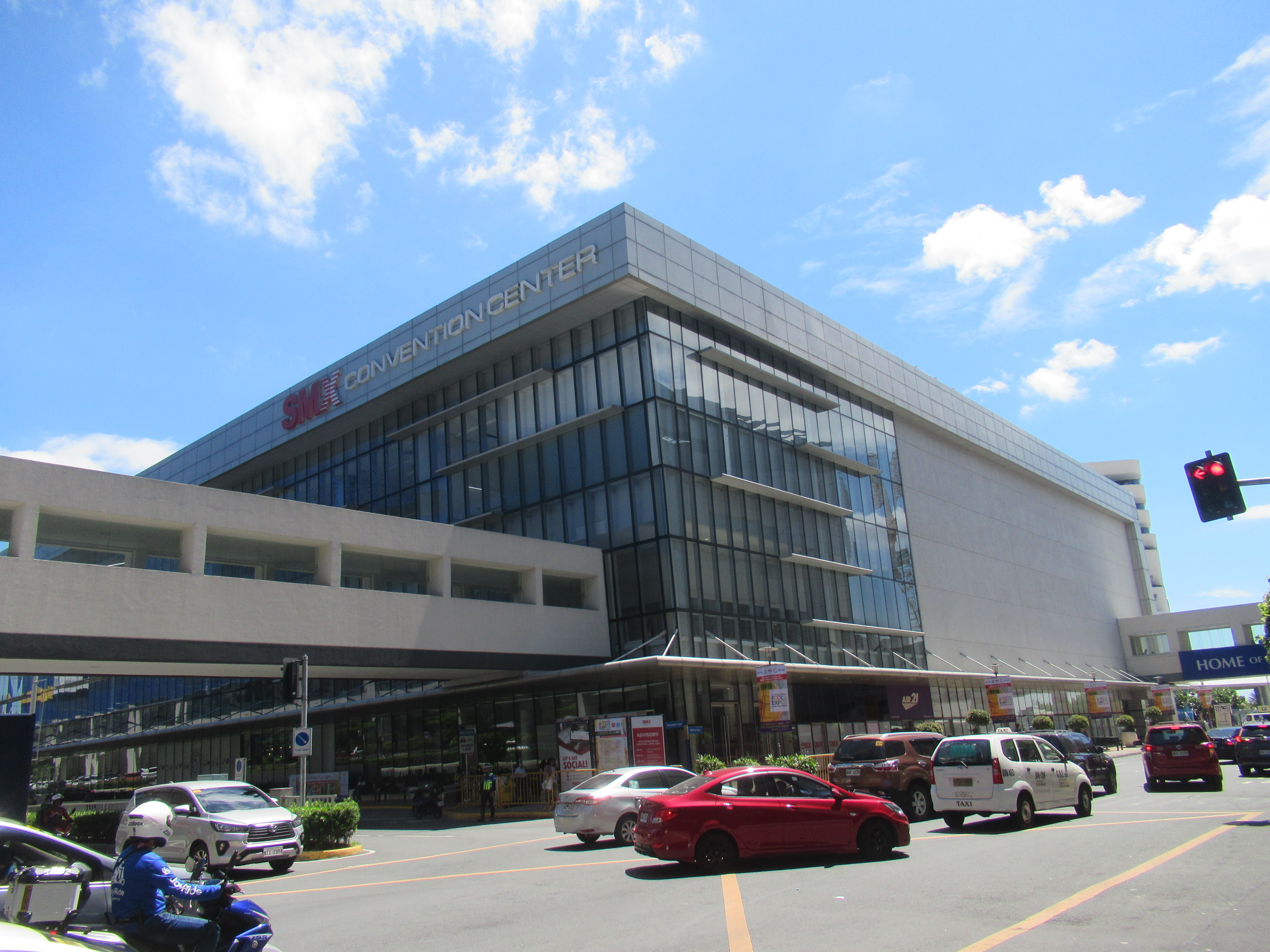
- SMX Convention Center Manila in 2023
- Interactive map of SMX Convention Center Manila
- Former names: MAITRADE Expo and Convention Center
- Location: Seashell Lane, Mall of Asia Complex, Pasay, Metro Manila, Philippines
- Coordinates: 14°31′55″N 120°58′53″E
- Owner: SMX Convention Center

Construction
- Built: 2006–2007
- Opened: November 5, 2007; 18 years ago
- Cost: ₱1.8 billion
- Architects: Arquitectonica (design consultant); Jose Siao Ling and Associates (architect of record)

Website
- www.smxconventioncenter.com/smx-manila/

The SMX Convention Center Manila, also simply known as SMX Manila, is a convention center located in Pasay, Philippines. It is the largest private venue in the Philippines for trade events, industry conventions, corporate functions, and international exhibitions. The building is located beside the SM Mall of Asia, and is considered part of the Mall of Asia Complex. It is owned by the company of the same name. It can fit approximately 6,000 people.

== History ==
Work on the construction of the convention center, then known as the MAITRADE Expo and Convention Center, began with the groundbreaking ceremony held on March 23, 2006. The cement pouring ceremony was held a few months later on September 21 of the same year. It was later renamed SMX Convention Center during that year.

It opened on November 5, 2007, as the country's largest privately run convention center. It was constructed at a cost of ₱1.8 billion. Being the first under the SMX brand, it was later renamed SMX Convention Center Manila to distinguish itself from other SMX branches, all built from 2012 onwards.

== Facilities ==
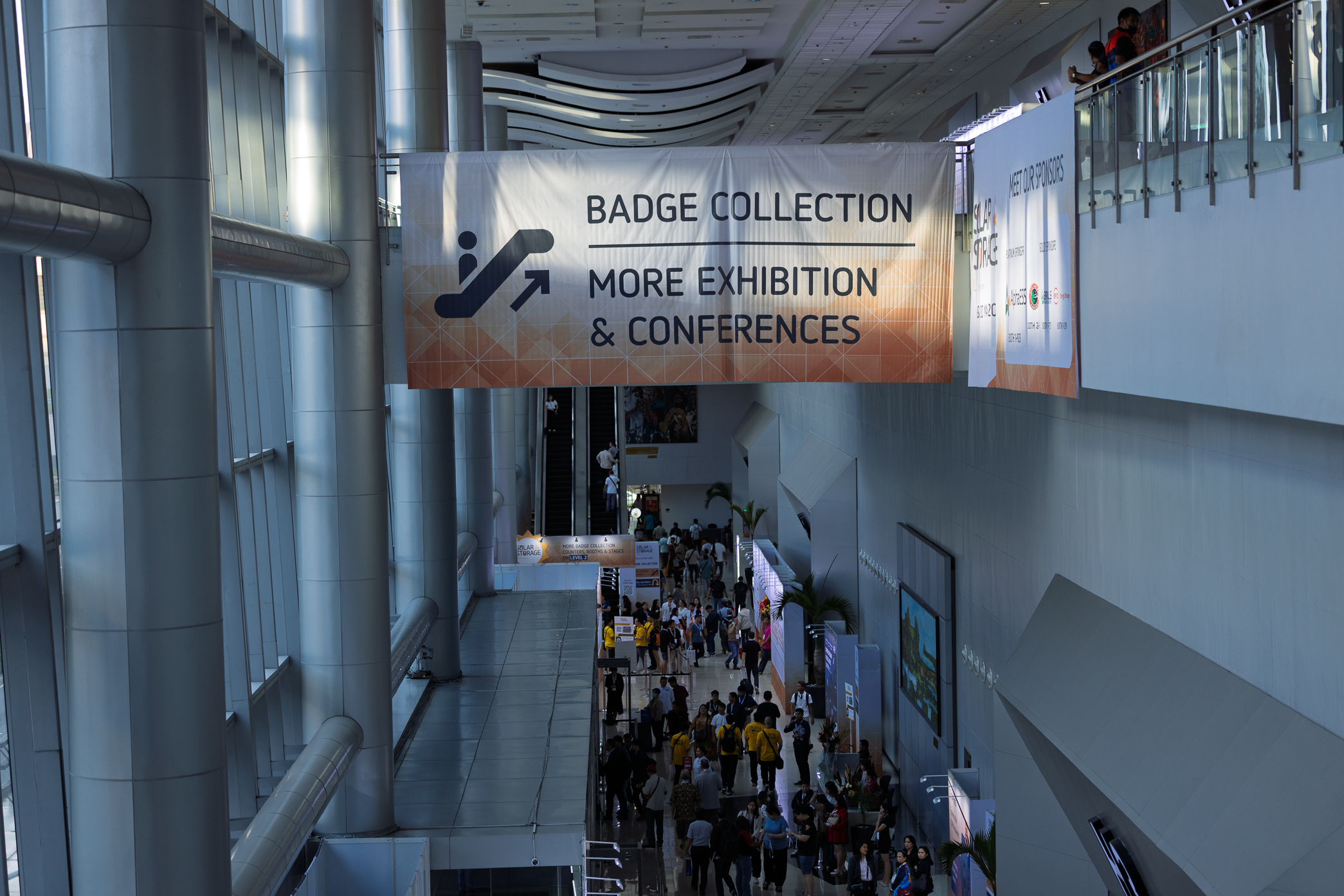
Inside SMX Convention Center Manila

The SMX Convention Center Manila has 4 exhibition halls, 5 function rooms, and 14 meeting rooms, with 21,000 m^{2} (230,000 sq ft) of leasable space. It is suitable for many events. It is designed by the architect Jose Siao Ling, who maximized the use of space, giving exhibitors flexibility, and options in terms of their specific area requirements.

Exhibition halls, located on the ground level, occupy a total floor area of 9,130 m^{2} (98,300 sq ft) with a combined capacity of up to 10,240. On the second level, the function rooms occupy a total floor area of 7,100 m^{2} (76,000 sq ft) with a combined capacity of up to 9,408, while the meeting rooms span a combined area of 950 m^{2} (10,200 sq ft), each accommodating capacities ranging from 12 to 112. SMX Convention Center Manila also has a basement parking that can accommodate 400 cars, with an entrance on Coral Way and an exit on Marina Way. Commercial shops are located along the perimeter, specifically at the ground level and mezzanine. Truck bays are situated at the back, along Ocean Drive.

Bridgeways on the mezzanine connect SMX Convention Center Manila to SM Mall of Asia's south parking building, S Maison at Conrad Manila's podium, MOA Square, and National University MOA, respectively.

== Events ==
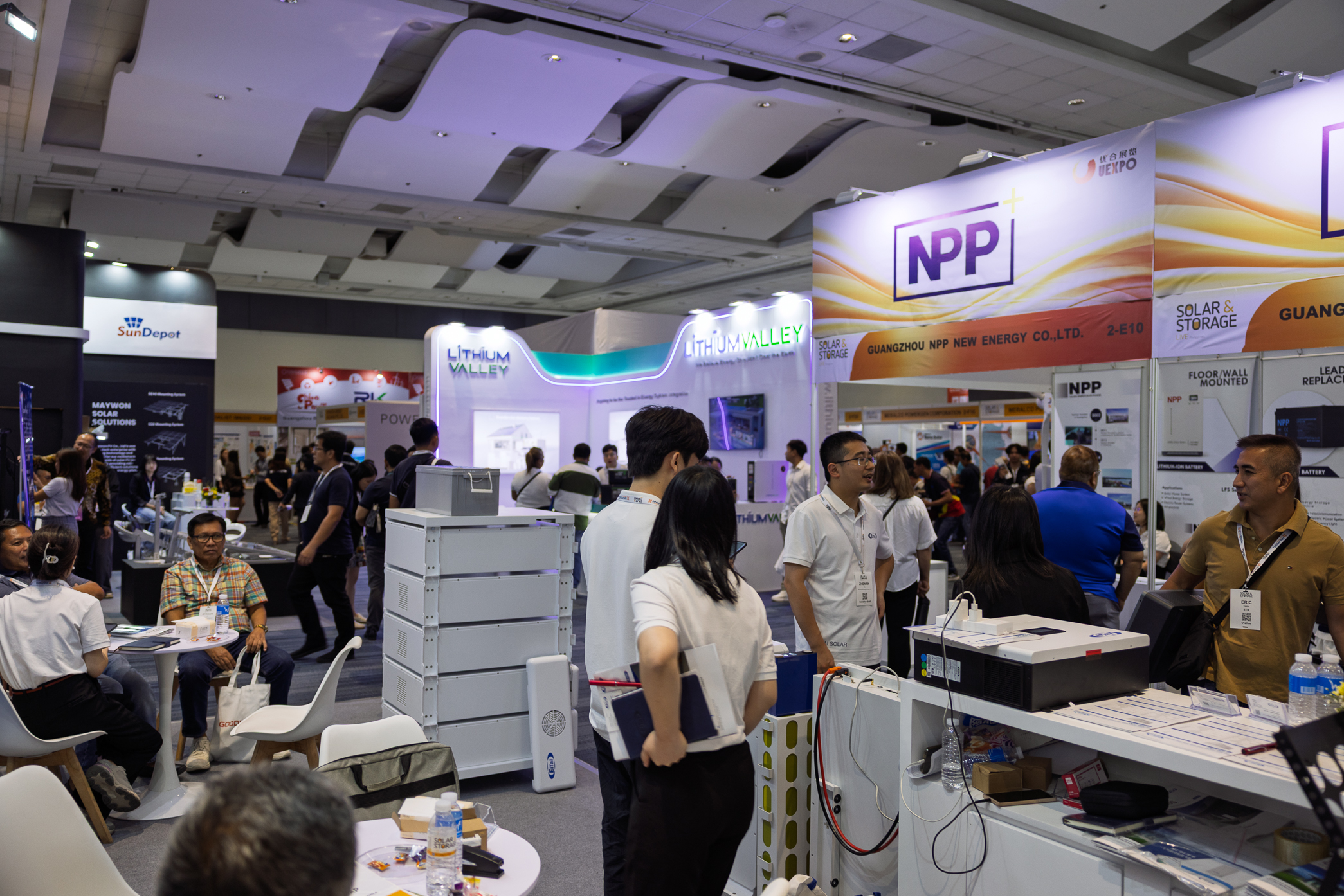
Solar and Storage Live Philippines 2025 held at a function room of SMX Convention Center Manila

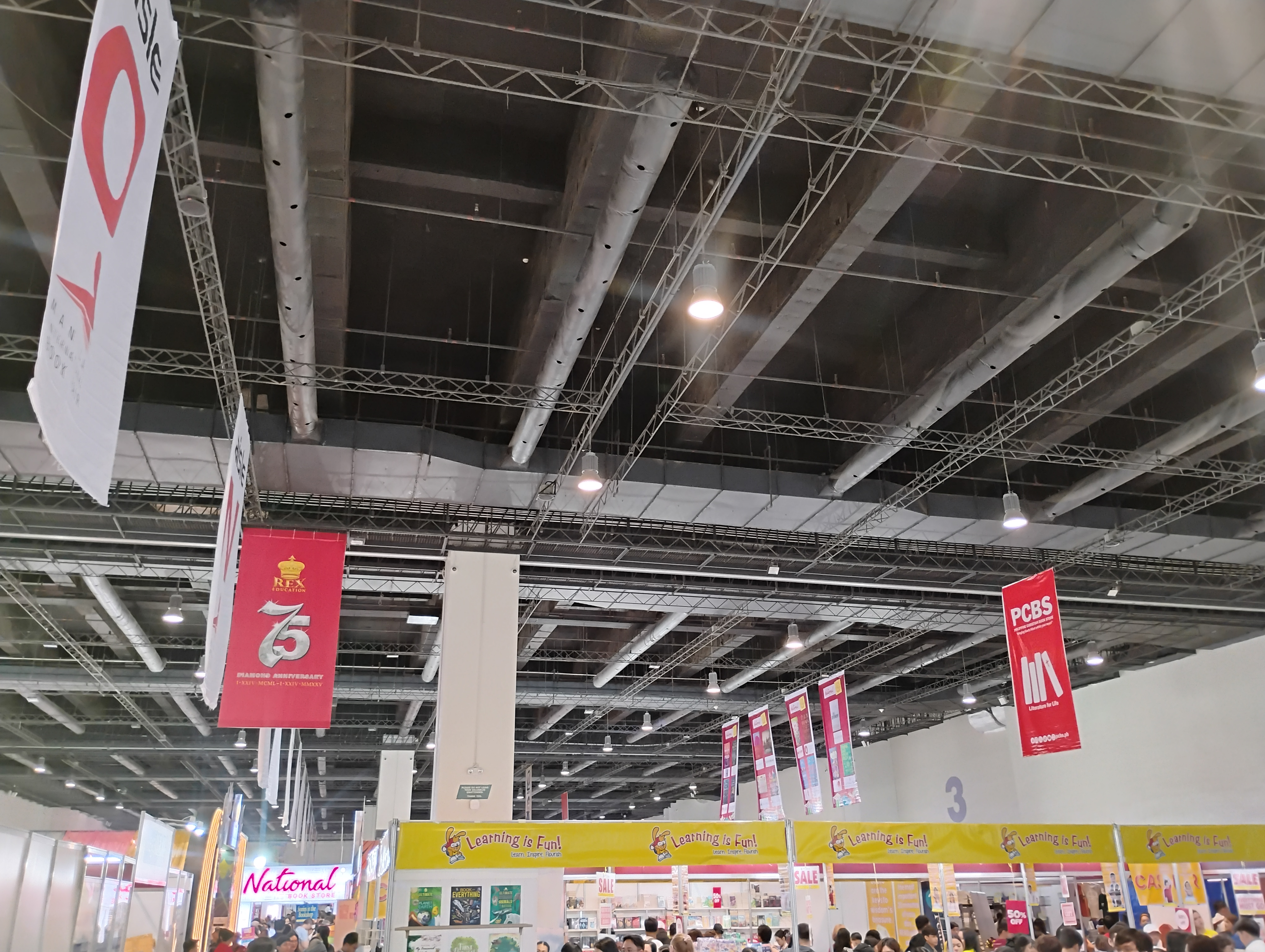
Manila International Book Fair 2025 held at the halls of SMX Convention Center Manila

Since its opening in November 2007, the SMX Convention Center Manila has held some of the largest trade events in the country, including CITEM's Manila FAME International, International Food and Beverage Expo, Global Link MP's China Products Exhibition, Manufacturing Technology World Series, and Primetrade Asia's Manila International Book Fair. The ASEAN Tourism Investment Forum 2008 and the 8th International Conference of Asian Clinical Oncology Society were also held at the SMX Convention Center.

SMX Manila is the main venue of Cosplay Mania's series of events since 2010, after their initial tenure at the Megatrade Hall in SM Megamall. It is also the venue of Bo Sanchez's Feast Conference since 2012, when it was previously known as the Kerygma Conference.

On November 28 and 29, 2011, the 5th National G12 Conference was held at SMX. The event used all four exhibit halls and the function rooms. With almost 20,000 guests, the event exceeded the typical capacity of the Convention Center of 12,000. The four halls were converted into one huge space.

From 2015 to 2018, the Asia Pop Comic Convention was annually held at the SMX.

On November 12, 2017, the Gala Dinner of the 31st ASEAN Summit was held at SMX.

On March 24 and 25, 2018, ComicCon Asia was held at SMX.

In addition to exhibitions and conventions, it can accommodate other events and concerts. In August 2008, international artist Alicia Keys' As I Am Tour and the grand finale of GMA Network's Pinoy Idol were held at SMX.

The 2026 Philippine Pokémon Master Ball League, a qualifying tournament for the 2026 Pokémon World Championships, was held at Function Room 5 of the convention center on April 25 and 26.

== Awards ==
In 2024, SMX Manila won three major awards, including Best Local Convention Centre 2024 by APAC Insider’s South East Asia Business Review, Best Convention Center by World MICE Awards and Best Convention & Exhibition Center at the 33rd TTG Travel Awards.
