= Pow Chavez =

Filipino musician

- Occupations: Singer; songwriter; record producer
- Musical career
- Genres: Pop
- Instrument: Vocals
- Member of: FlipMusic

Pow Chavez is a Filipino singer, songwriter, and record producer. He competed in the first season of Philippine Idol, finishing the show at fifth place. In 2011, he co-founded the Philippine production house FlipMusic, along with Julius James de Belen and Jellica Mateo.

Chavez was one of the songwriters for Bini's 2023 single "Pantropiko" (transl. Tropical). He is currently the vocal coach for the P-pop girl group Vvink.

== Early life and education ==
Chavez played basketball when he was younger. In high school and college, he continued to train in sports. In 2009, he became a member of the University of the Philippines' dragon boat team.

== Career ==
In 2006, Chavez competed on season one of Philippine Idol, landing in the top five of the singing contest. Idol judge Pilita Corrales praised him as "idol material". On November 20, he was eliminated from the show. He has said that he was excluded from a Malaysian singing competition in 2007 due to transphobia. In 2009, he came up with the idea for the production house FlipMusic with Julius James de Belen. In the same year, Chavez made his acting debut in Goals and Girls, the Filipino adaptation of a Malaysian TV show. He portrayed the star player in a local futsal team. The series starred Empress Schuck and aired every Sunday on TV5.

Chavez, James de Belen, and Chavez' fellow Philippine Idol alumnus Jellica Mateo, founded FlipMusic in 2011. In January 2013, Chavez was a featured vocalist on "Biglang Liko" (transl. Sudden Turn). The Nigerian newspaper Premium Times praised the song's "fresh" synths, describing them as "ideal for the summer". In 2015, Chavez trained and mentored contestants in Greenwich Pizza's Ultimate Bandkada Search.

Chavez composed "Going Crazy", a song that Alden Richards debuted in his 2020 concert. In November 2022, Chavez performed the TV5 Christmas jingle, "Sama-Samang Ihatid ang Ibang Saya ng Pasko" (transl. Let's Bring the Different Joys of Christmas Together), alongside his fellow Philippine Idol alumni. He was the vocal arranger and one of the songwriters for the Bini song "Pantropiko" (transl. Tropical). He is the vocal coach of the P-pop girl group Vvink.

== Personal life ==
Chavez is a trans man.

== Advocacy ==
In 2011, Chavez collaborated with Amnesty International Philippines to campaign for human rights. On November 26, 2012, Chavez performed on the first day of the 18-Day Campaign to End Violence Against Women at the Quirino Grandstand, organized by the Philippine Commission on Women.

== Filmography ==
=== Television ===
Year	Title	Role	Ref.
2006	Philippine Idol	Himself (contestant)	
2009	Goals and Girls	Star player	
2025	Family Feud	Himself (contestant)	
