= Feel Good (Bini album) =

Studio album by Bini
- Released: September 29, 2022
- Genres: Bubblegum pop; pop rock; electropop
- Length: 27:12
- Languages: English; Tagalog
- Label: Star
- Producers: Bojam; Simone Ermacora; Jonathan Manalo; Theory

Bini chronology
Born to Win (2021)	Feel Good (2022)	Talaarawan (2024)

Singles from Feel Good
- 1. "Lagi" Released: June 24, 2022; 2. "I Feel Good" Released: September 22, 2022

Feel Good is the second studio album by Filipino girl group Bini. It was released on September 29, 2022, by Star Music. The album features songs that were released as a single "Lagi" and "I Feel Good". Feel Good is a bubblegum pop that explores themes of love, including falling in love, sustaining relationships, and overcoming challenges.

== Background and release ==
Bini debuted after three years of training under Star Hunt Academy (SHA). On September 28, 2021, the group announced the schedules and the release of their studio album Born to Win. On October 22, 2024, Born to Win had reached 100 million streams on Spotify.

Following the success of the album, Bini released their second album on September 29, 2022. The group announced a launch showcase for the album on October 1 at the Sky Dome, SM North EDSA in Quezon City. All tickets came with a poster and copy of Feel Good. The showcase was rescheduled to October 27 for health reasons; tickets purchased for the original date were honored for the rescheduled event.

"Lagi" was later included in the soundtrack for the 2022 romantic comedy film An Inconvenient Love, as well as the 2024 romantic comedy series What's Wrong with Secretary Kim, the Philippine adaptation of the 2018 Korean series of the same name. In August 2024, a remake of "Lagi" called "Rexona Lagi" was released for the roll-on deodorant brand Rexona, alongside a music video.

In November 2024, Star Music collaborated with the record shop Backspacer Records to release limited-edition vinyl copies of Born to Win, Feel Good, and Talaarawan. The copies of Feel Good were pressed on solid hot pink vinyl. In 2025, the vinyl records were reissued for sale in response to demand, with a limited pre-sale beginning on May 1, 2025.

== Composition ==
The album highlights themes of love, including falling in love, maintaining relationships and overcoming challenges, presented through five original songs and two bonus tracks. Its key track, "Strings" was co-written by the girl group alongside music director Jonathan Manalo and songwriter Robert Perema. Its dark and serious tone marked a venture beyond the group's bubblegum pop repertoire.

== Critical reception ==
The album's component song, "Huwag Muna Tayong Umuwi" (Let's Not Go Home Yet), gained recognition among listeners, particularly the LGBT community for being a love song whose lyrics transcend gender boundaries, and was incorporated into the soundtrack of the 2022 romantic comedy film An Inconvenient Love.

Rafael Bautista of Nylon Manila wrote that Feel Good was a more polished product compared to Born to Win, Bini's debut album. He commended the diversity of genres to be found in Feel Good; on one hand, tracks like "Lagi" and "I Feel Good" offered a more refined version of Bini's signature bubblegum pop sound, while others like "Huwag Muna Tayong Umuwi", a "somber" ballad, showed a different side to the group.

== Commercial performance ==
Following its release on September 29, Feel Good topped several iTunes charts, such as New Music Daily, Future Hits, and Absolute OPM, with all of its tracks within the Top 15 on iTunes' Song chart. The album also featured on Spotify's New Music Friday Philippines and Radar PH playlists; it additionally secured the top position on the P-pop on The Rise playlist.

== Accolades ==
Awards and nominations for Feel Good
Ceremony	Year	Category	Result	Ref.
Awit Awards	2023	Album of the Year	Nominated	

== Listicles ==
Name of publisher, year listed, name of listicle, and placement
Publisher	Year	Listicle	Placement	Ref.
Billboard Philippines	2024	This Year's Must Have Records	Placed	

== Track listing ==
Feel Good track listing
No.	Title	Writer(s)	Producer(s)	Length
1.	"No Fear"	Kendall "Theory" Williams	Simone Ermacora; Theory	3:27
2.	"Lagi"	Louie Canaria; Ramiru Mataro	Jonathan Manalo	4:16
3.	"I Feel Good"	John Michael Conchada; Julius James "Jumbo" De Belen	Bojam	3:48
4.	"Huwag Muna Tayong Umuwi"	Glanina Camille Del Rosario; De Belen	Bojam	4:57
5.	"Strings"	Bini; Manalo; Robert Parena	Manalo	3:20
6.	"Lagi" (acoustic)	Canaria	Manalo	4:02
7.	"Strings" (dance version)	Bini; Manalo; Parena	Manalo	3:20
Total length:				27:13

== Certifications ==
Certifications for Feel Good
Region	Certification	Certified units/sales
Philippines (PARI)	Gold	7,500^{*}
^{*} Sales figures based on certification alone.

== Release history ==
Release dates and formats for Feel Good
Region	Date	Format	Label	Ref.
Various	September 29, 2022	Digital download; streaming	Star Music	
Philippines	January 14, 2023	CD	Star Music	
Philippines	December 7, 2024	Vinyl	Star Music	
