= Sassa Gurl =

Filipino comedian, vlogger, and singer

- Born: Felix Petate; Quezon City, Metro Manila, Philippines
- Education: Far Eastern University (AB)
- Occupations: Actor; model; vlogger; comedian; singer; host
- Years active: 2019–present

Felix Petate, known professionally as Sassa Gurl, is a Filipino comedian, vlogger, and singer who gained popularity on TikTok since 2019.

== Early life ==
In her first year of college as a communications major, Sassa dropped out to pursue styling as a way to peek into the world of entertainment. After facing struggles, she returned to school and graduated from Far Eastern University. She then took a call center job so she could afford to buy a secondhand cellphone and start her career as a social media personality.

Raised by traditional conservative Filipino parents, Sassa faced the same challenges as many other children grappling with their gender identity in a country that has yet to enact an anti-discrimination law. Sassa Gurl is a member of the LGBTQIA+ community and defines herself as a trans woman, using the pronoun "she/her".

== Career ==
=== Social media ===
Sassa Gurl is a content creator and social media personality, known for her comedic skits and lip-sync videos across platforms such as TikTok, Facebook, Instagram, YouTube, and X. She gained additional recognition as the "Drag Runner" on the show Drag Den.

=== Brand ambassadorship ===
In 2022, Sassa Gurl became the calendar model for White Castle Whisky, becoming the first LGBTQIA+ individual to be featured in the liquor brand's calendar campaign. In February 2026, Sassa Gurl appeared in promotional content for Mobile Legends: Bang Bang.

=== Acting ===
In 2021, Sassa Gurl made her acting debut in the television series Wish Ko Lang. She subsequently appeared in the film Balota and had roles in The Entitled and Takeshi's Castle Philippines.

=== Music ===
Sassa Gurl has been involved in several music projects, including the single "Panaginip" with Toni Fowler. She has also contributed to "Aries Rising" by Aries Night and "Pom Pom (Take Me High)" by Manila Luzon. In 2022, she released the single "Lagot!" and in 2023, "Maria Hiwaga", which she co-wrote with Kumareng Harvey and Silas, with Ken Ponce as producer.

== Discography ==
=== Singles ===
Year	Title	Lead artist(s)	Composer(s)	Ref.
2022	"Lagot"	Sassa Gurl	Harvey Encarnacion	
2023	"Maria Hiwaga"	Sassa Gurl	Sassa Gurl, Kumareng Harvey, Silas	
2023	"Panaginip" (featuring Toni Fowler)	Sassa Gurl	Sassa Gurl	
2024	"Pom Pom (Take Me High)"	Manila Luzon	Lance Silas Castro, Karl Westerberg, Sassa Gurl	
2024	"Aries Rising"	Aries Night, Sassa Gurl	Meg Villanueva, Pancho Maniquis, Sassa Gurl	
2024	"UMA"	Sassa Gurl	Sassa Gurl, Jelo De Leon	
2025	"QC Gurlz (Remix)" (with Stef Aranas)	Stef Aranas, Sassa Gurl	Stef Aranas, Eugene Yaptangco, Sassa Gurl	

== Filmography ==
=== Films ===
Key
†	Denotes films that have not yet been released

Year	Title	Role	Ref.
2022	The Entitled	Kim	
2024	Balota	Babe	
2025	Bar Boys: After School	Trisha Perez	
2025	Shake, Rattle & Roll: Evil Origins	Sky	
2026	Multwoh †	TBA	

=== TV series ===
Year	Title	Role
2022–2023	Drag Den season 1	Judge
2023	Royal Blood	Henchman
2023	Takeshi's Castle Philippines	Felix Petate
2024	Drag Den season 2	Judge
2024	Regal Studio Presents	King / Performer
2025	Prinsesa ng City Jail	Barangay Tanod
2025	Mga Batang Riles	Lala's Friend
2025	Rainbow Rumble	Contestant

=== Music video appearances ===
Year	Title	Singer/Artist
2022	"Hauntingly"	Silas
2023	"Maria Hiwaga"	Sassa Gurl
2023	"Panaginip"	Sassa Gurl, Toni Fowler
2024	"Pom Pom (Take Me High)"	Manila Luzon, Sassa Gurl
2025	"Dungka!"	SB19
2025	"QC Gurlz (Remix)"	Stef Aranas, Sassa Gurl

== Awards and nominations ==
Award ceremony	Year	Category	Recipient	Result	Ref.
Paragala Media Awards	2025	Most Empowering National Digital Voice	Sassa Gurl	Won	
Platinum Stallion National Media Awards	2026	Breakthrough Artist of the Year	Bar Boys: After School	Won	
VP Choice Awards	2021	Spotlight of the Year	Sassa Gurl	Won	
