= Aiah =

Filipino singer and dancer (born 2001)

- Aiah in 2025
- Born: Maraiah Queen Jaraula Arceta; January 27, 2001 (age 25); Lapu-Lapu City, Cebu, Philippines
- Occupations: Singer; rapper; dancer; model
- Years active: 2020–present
- Title: Miss Silka Philippines 2018
- Musical career
- Genres: P-pop; bubblegum pop; teen pop; EDM
- Label: Star
- Member of: Bini

Maraiah Queen Jaraula Arceta (born January 27, 2001), known professionally as Aiah, is a Filipino singer, rapper, dancer, and model. Her career began by participating in school events, modeling, and beauty pageants, winning titles such as Miss Silka Cebu and Miss Silka Philippines 2018. After gaining early exposure through various ABS-CBN auditions, she joined Star Hunt Academy (SHA), graduating as one of the final SHA Girl Trainees in October 2020, which later became the Filipino girl group Bini and debuted on June 11, 2021. In her musical career, Aiah co-wrote their single "Kapit Lang" (2021), writing the rap verse for the song. She also starred in the music video of Jeremy G's song "Bini" (2023), which she later co-sang with him in the remix version of the song in 2024. In 2023, she won the Top Female Visual of the Year award at the 8th P-pop Awards.

Beyond her musical career, she has ventured into acting and television, making guest appearances on programs including Drag Den and Kuan on One. Aiah also conducts philanthropic work through her annual charity project, Aiahdvocacy, supporting community outreach and environmental initiatives. Multiple sources have also credited Aiah for providing representation for the Cebuano language in the media.

== Early life and education ==
Maraiah Queen Jaraula Arceta was born on January 27, 2001 to Dick and Mary Louh Arceta in Lapu-Lapu City, Cebu, Philippines, where she was raised alongside her only brother.

In 2022, Aiah enrolled at Enderun Colleges in Taguig as a scholar, taking a degree in architecture in Interior Design and Multimedia Arts.

== Career ==
=== 2018–2020: Pageantry, Star Hunt Academy audition ===
Prior to her career with Bini, Aiah participated in school events, modeling, and beauty pageants. She won five pageant titles within three years, including Miss Asian Learning Center 2016, Miss St. Joseph School of Mactan 2017, and Miss Teen Mactan 2018. On September 29, 2018, she was crowned Miss Silka (Note: Silka is a skincare brand in the Philippines.) Cebu at Robinsons Galleria Cebu. On November 30, she proceeded to compete in the 11th Miss Silka Philippines pageant at Market! Market! in Taguig and won the title of Miss Silka Philippines 2018 on that day.

She attended two auditions for ABS-CBN's Star Hunt in Cebu. In 2018, she auditioned for Pinoy Big Brother: Otso and advanced to the third round of the audition process but did not secure a spot as a housemate. Following her experience with Otso, she auditioned for the 2022 TV series Darna, encouraged by her modeling agency, but did not get the role. During her appearance on the Cebuano talk show Kuan on One, she mentioned that her manager revealed that their aim was not to get the role, but to be noticed by the Star Hunt staff. A few months after her audition, Aiah received a call inviting her to Manila to join a girl group. She accepted the invitation and became the last to join Star Hunt Academy as a trainee, joining the other trainees three months after training began. On October 10, 2020, she was one of the last eight members of the SHA Girl Trainees to graduate from the academy and was officially announced as a member of an idol group.

In November 2020, Aiah officially became a member of the Filipino girl group Bini, becoming one of the rappers of the group. They officially debuted on June 11, 2021.

=== 2021–present: Bini, acting and television ventures ===
In 2021, Aiah co-wrote Bini's third single, "Kapit Lang" (Hold On), along with Lian Kyla, writing the rap verse of the song. In 2023, Aiah starred in the music video for the song "Bini" by Jeremy G. In January 2024, Aiah appeared along with Bini members Stacey and Mikha as guest judges on the second season of Drag Den, a drag reality show hosted by Manila Luzon.

On June 28, she was featured on a remix of the song "Bini", originally a track on Jeremy G's first full-length album, Late Night Madness (2023). The remix featuring Aiah was included in Jeremy G's 2024 album Late Night (More) Madness. In July, Aiah was interviewed by Melai Cantiveros in an episode of the Cebuano-language talk show Kuan on One.

Aiah appeared in a dramatization of fellow Bini member Sheena's life story in the anthology series Maalaala Mo Kaya (transl. Would You Remember), which premiered on May 1, 2025.

On October 23, she was announced as a special guest performer for Thai actress Becky Armstrong's birthday concert, B New Era. The event took place on November 30, in Bangkok, Thailand. At the concert, Aiah covered "Fighter" by Christina Aguilera. The Philippine Daily Inquirer's Jessica Ann Evangelista lauded her skills and "star power" in the performance.

== Media image ==
In an article published on May 10, 2024, Billboard Philippines included Aiah in a list of Filipino celebrities who could "bring the right energy and distinctness" to avant-garde outfits from the Met Gala. Its writer, Kara Angan, noted that "there are many ways that Aiah can pull off a high-fashion piece".

== Influence ==
In an article published on June 13, 2024, Jessa Ngojo of Cebu Daily News hailed Aiah as one of the "Bisdak beauties" who have become "beloved icons for Cebuanos, Boholanos, and Visayans". Billboard Philippines' Gabriel Saulog praised Aiah for incorporating her Cebuano heritage in her "jaw-dropping" solo performance at the Biniverse tour. She covered "Woman" by Doja Cat, adding a Cebuano-language rap verse that Saulog called "fantastic". In March 2025, Julienne Loreto of the American magazine Positively Filipino credited Aiah for increasing the general public's interest in the Cebuano language.

== Personal life ==
On August 30, 2024, during a Bini event at SM Mall of Asia, a fan gave Aiah a Chow Chow-Japanese Spitz dog as a surprise gift. It garnered mixed reactions online. Pawssion Project, a non-profit animal welfare organization, criticized the surprise, stating that "pets are not gifts", though they clarified that it was not an attack on the singer.

Aiah has anxiety episodes. The documentary Bini Chapter 1: Born to Win explored her "battle" with anxiety. It was Aiah's choice for Born to Win to include depictions of her anxiety, hoping to comfort viewers with similar experiences. In Born to Win, she explained her decision to be open about her mental health: "If sharing my experience can help someone, then I'll do it."

== Philanthropy ==
On September 21, 2024, Aiah visited a barangay in Tondo, Manila, to distribute goods to children, marking the beginning of "Aiahdvocacy", an annual charity project that distributes donations and assistance to communities and facilities across the Philippines from September to December. In October, Aiah, along with her mother and Bini members Colet and Maloi, visited the Golden Reception and Action Center for the Elderly and Other Special Cases (GRACES), a nursing home in Quezon City, with support from volunteers from the Philippine Air Force and Aiah's fans. In November, following their Grand Biniverse concert, Aiah carried out her charity project for the month in La Union. Aiah, along with her team, conducted beach cleanup, tree planting, and hosted a thanksgiving program for the locals, giving goods along the way.

In May 2025, a fan group launched a project called Colaiah (Colet and Aiah) Cares, which gave away food, hygiene kits, and school supplies to underprivileged children in Quezon City. Both Aiah and Colet supported the initiative.

On October 2, 2025, Aiah launched a donation drive through her Aiahdvocacy to victims of the 2025 Cebu earthquake, raising over ₱440,000 (US$8,934.01). She also announced that a portion of the sales from her cap brand, Arc, would be donated to the earthquake victims.

On October 20, she joined a relief mission in Manay, Davao Oriental, helping distribute relief packs, bottles of water, and blankets to victims of the 2025 Davao Oriental earthquakes.

On November 9, Aiah and Colet visited Cebu to distribute relief goods to survivors of Typhoon Kalmaegi (Tino).

== Discography ==
=== As lead artist ===
List of singles, showing year released and associated albums
Title	Year	Album	Ref.
"Bini" (with Jeremy G)	2024	Late Night (More) Madness	

== Filmography ==
=== Television ===
Year	Title	Role	Notes	Ref.
2024	Drag Den	Guest judge	Season 2	

=== Music videos ===
Year	Title	Artist	Director	Ref.
2023	"Bini"	Jeremy G	Karlo Calingao	
2026	"Attention"	James Reid	Ingrid Ignacio-Termulo	

== Awards and nominations ==
Award	Year	Category	Recipient(s)	Result	Ref.
Anak TV Seal Awards	2025	Net Makabata Star Award	Aiah	Awardee	
P-pop Music Awards	2023	Top Female Visual of the Year	Aiah	Won	
P-pop Music Awards	2025	P-pop Favorite Visual of the Year	Aiah	Nominated	
P-pop Music Awards	2026	Visual of the Year	Aiah	Won	
VP Choice Awards	2025	Breakthrough Social Media Star of the Year	Aiah	Won	

== Listicles ==
Name of publisher, year listed, name of listicle, and placement
Publisher	Year	Listicle	Placement	Ref.
TC Candler	2024	100 Most Beautiful Faces	88	
TC Candler	2025	100 Most Beautiful Faces	99	
