= Lady Gagita =

Filipino drag performer (born 1993)

- Born: Vinzon Leojay Rubia Booc; 23 September 1993 (age 32); Davao City, Philippines
- Other names: Katy Perya
- Education: Holy Cross of Davao College
- Occupation: Drag queen
- Years active: 2010–present
- Television: Drag Den (season 1)

Vinzon Leojay Rubia Booc (born 23 September 1993), better known as Lady Gagita, is a Filipino drag performer. She (Note: Booc's pronouns are he/him. However, when he performs as Lady Gagita, the pronouns are she/her. This article uses both sets of pronouns accordingly.) is best known for impersonating many American musical artists such as Lady Gaga and Katy Perry. She also competed in the first season of Drag Den.

== Early life ==
Vinzon Leojay Rubia Booc was born on 23 September 1993, in Davao City, Davao del Sur, to two Filipino parents.

== Career ==
While attending college at Holy Cross of Davao College, Booc first accidentally started drag in 2010, when he released a parody video of "Telephone" (2010) by Lady Gaga. The parody video became an internet sensation and surpassed two million views on YouTube, and was praised by fashion director Nicola Formichetti. She appeared in various video series alongside Risa Hontiveros and Jon Avila, to "spread the message about equality" and "focusing on HIV and AIDS awareness."

In June 2021, Lady Gagita joined Nadine Lustre, Viñas DeLuxe, and other drag performers in a virtual benefit concert raising funds for The Golden Gays, a non-profit organization that provides support and care facilities for elderly LGBTQ people. She was awarded Local Drag Queen of the Year by Village Pipol Choice Awards.

Lady Gagita was revealed as one of the contestants competing in the first season of Drag Den, on 17 November 2022. She won both the main challenge, which is a talent show, and the lip-sync challenge in the fourth episode. In the sixth episode, her runway was inspired to stop cancel culture. She was eliminated in fifth place and 90.14 was her final score of the series. In February 2023, Lady Gagita was announced as the head judge for her upcoming drag reality competition series, Mudrakels, where showcases drag mothers being important roles and mentoring new drag artists.

== Personal life ==
Booc is gay, and uses the pronouns he/him out of drag and she/her in drag.

== Discography ==
=== Promotional singles ===
List of promotional singles, showing the year released, and album name
Title	Year	Album	Ref.
"May Kapa" with the cast of Drag Den (season 1)	2023	Non-album promotional single	

== Filmography ==
=== Television ===
List of television credits
Year	Title	Role	Notes	Ref.
2022	Magpakailanman		Episode: "Born To Be A Queen"	
2022	Drag Den	Herself/Contestant	Season 1 — 5th place	
2023	Mudrakels	Herself/Host		
2024	Magpakailanman		Episode: "Ang Ina Kong Ahas"	

== Awards and nominations ==
Name of the award ceremony, year presented, category, nominee(s) of the award, and the result of the nomination
Award	Year	Category	Recipient(s) and nominee(s)	Result	Ref.
Village Pipol Choice Awards	2021	Local Drag Queen of the Year	Lady Gagita	Won	
