= Bini (Jeremy G song) =

Single by Jeremy G featuring Aiah Arceta
- Language: Tagalog
- Written: 2022
- Released: June 28, 2024
- Genre: dance-pop
- Length: 4:54
- Label: Star
- Songwriters: Jeremy Eriq Glinoga; Jonathan Manalo; Rox Santos
- Producer: Jonathan Manalo

Jeremy G singles chronology
"Hanngang Tanong Na Lang" (2023)	"Bini" (2024)	"Parking Lot" (2025)

"Bini" (stylized in all caps) is a song by the Filipino musician Jeremy G featuring Bini member Aiah Arceta. It was released on June 28, 2024, (Note: The song was originally released on March 24, 2023, with Jeremy G credited as the sole primary artist.) through Star Music. Written by Jeremy Eriq Glinoga, Jonathan Manalo, and Rox Santos, the song was produced by Manalo. "Bini" is a dance-pop song that explores the themes of admiration for an idealized figure.

== Background and release ==
Jeremy Glinoga has expanded his career to include television hosting in addition to music. He has worked programs such as Pak na Pak!, Palong Follow on PIE, The Voice Kids, and the Philippine variety show ASAP.

Glinoga released the single "Bini" on March 24, 2023, by Star Music. The song late reissued on June 28, 2024, featuring Filipino girl group Bini member Aiah Arceta, who also appeared in accompanying music video.

== Composition ==
"Bini" is four minutes and fifty-four seconds long. Glinoga co-wrote the song with ABS-CBN Music creative director Jonathan Manalo, and Star Pop label head Rox Santos. The song is a dance-pop and described as expressing admiration for an idealized figure, noting that its lyrics convey shyness in approaching someone and instead channeling those feelings into music. The song was initially written in 2022 during an informal studio session with Manalo and Santos.

== Credits and personnel ==
Credits are adapted by Tidal.

- Jeremy G – lead vocal
- Aiah Arceta – lead vocal
- ABS-CBN Film Productions, Inc. – music publisher
- Jonathan Manalo – composer
- Rox Santos – composer
