= Drag Den season 1 =

First season of Drag Den

Drag Den
- Season 1
- Promotional poster for season one.
- Hosted by: Manila Luzon
- Judges: Manila Luzon; Sassa Gurl; Nicole Cordoves
- No. of contestants: 8
- Winner: Naia
- Runners-up: Shewarma; Maria Cristina
- No. of episodes: 8

Release
- Original network: Amazon Prime Video
- Original release: 8 December 2022 – 26 January 2023

Season chronology
- Next → Season 2

The first season of Drag Den premiered on 8 December 2022, through Amazon Prime Video. The premiere season showcased a total of eight contestants competing for the title of the "First Filipino Drag Supreme".

Casting calls for the first season were opened in August 2021, and the cast was officially revealed in a teaser trailer in November 2022. The season also welcomed its first openly trans woman contestant, Barbie-Q. The winner of the season received a cash prize of ₱1,000,000, a one-year makeup supply from Téviant Beauty cosmetics, a one-year contract with Avignon Clinic, and a three-year management contract with CS Entertainment. The first season was won by Naia, with Shewarma and Maria Cristina as runners-up.

== Production ==
In July 2021, RuPaul's Drag Race alumna Manila Luzon exclusively told Entertainment Weekly about an upcoming project she is up to host and judge. Luzon said, "I'm excited that we're going to create an opportunity similar to [what] RuPaul and World of Wonder have given to me." The upcoming show is not affiliated with RuPaul's Drag Race or its production company, World of Wonder.

On 16 August 2021, Luzon partnered with TikTok and announced a casting call for the reality competition show. The deadline for the casting call ended on 31 August 2020. After the casting call announcement for Drag Den, RuPaul announced a casting call for Drag Race Philippines. Many fans called this announcement from RuPaul and World of Wonder: "foul" and "shade". A year later, Drag Race Philippines started to premiere in August 2022. Jiggly Caliente (presented as a judge) addressed the situation with Digital Spy saying, "There is definitely no rivalry because Manila knew about me doing Drag Race, and I knew about her doing Drag Den."

== Format ==
Contestants are instructed to participate in two challenges in the series. In both challenges, the judges will critique based on both challenges and choose their winner. The episode's winner will enter a battle with their chosen opponent, named the Dragdagulan, involving a wrecking ball. The winner of the battle will gain an advantage for the next episode; the opponent will not be eliminated and will continue in the competition.

== Promotion ==
After the series' long hiatus, the show's social media posted an update with the caption saying, "#justwokeup". Many people speculated that the show is yet to come sooner. On 16 November 2022, an official teaser was revealed with Manila Luzon sitting on a throne in the dark.

On 17 November 2022, eight contestants were shown in the new trailer heading down the runway. Sassa Gurl, Nicole Cordoves, and Manila Luzon, who served as the competition's main judges, all made appearances in the same trailer. Additionally, it revealed the official premiere date, which is slated for 8 December 2022, and will be available through Amazon Prime Video. On 30 November 2022, an official series trailer debuted, showcasing the candidates taking part in challenges while being judged, as well as the first challenge from the season premiere. It was revealed in the same official teaser that Catriona Gray will serve as a guest judge on the premiere of Drag Den. Luzon was recently signed with Warner Music Philippines, and announced the theme song for the series that is set to release on 2 December 2022.

== Contestants ==
On 17 November 2022, throughout the show's social media, they presented "Manila by Night" where they showed promotional images of their contestants' looks. This was a nod to the controversial Philippine film, Manila by Night (1980), directed by Ishmael Bernal. The series also welcomed its first openly trans woman contestant, Barbie-Q. Ages, names, and cities stated are at the time of filming.

Contestants from the first season of Drag Den and their backgrounds
Contestant	Age	Hometown	Outcome
Naia (Note: Naia Black is referred to as Naia on the series.)	26	Las Piñas, Metro Manila	Winner
Shewarma	22	Pateros, Metro Manila	Runners-up
Maria Cristina (Note: Maria Cristina is sometimes referred to as MC on the series.)	28	Bulacan, Central Luzon	Runners-up
Barbie-Q	35	Quezon City, Metro Manila	4th place
Lady Gagita	29	Davao City, Davao del Sur	5th place
Aries Night	24	Antipolo, Rizal	6th place
O-A (Note: Odasha Flop is referred to as O-A on the series.)	24	Parañaque, Metro Manila	7th place
Pura Luka Vega	32	Manila, Metro Manila	8th place

== Contestant progress ==
Legend:

Naia won Drag Den season 1.
Shewarma and Maria Cristina were the runners-up.
WIN indicates that the contestant was the highest in the ranking and won both the main challenge and the lip sync.
TOP indicates that the contestant was the highest in the ranking and won the main challenge, but lost the lip sync.
DWIN (Dragdagulan winner) indicates that the contestant was chosen by the main challenge winner and won the lip sync.
SAFE indicates that the contestant was declared safe by the judges.
ELIM (Eliminated) indicates that the contestant failed to accumulate enough points to advance to the finale.
Guest indicates that the contestant returned as a guest.

Progress of contestants including placements in each episode
Contestant	Episode						
Contestant	1	2	3	4	5	6	8
Naia	SAFE	SAFE	SAFE	SAFE	SAFE	SAFE	Winner
Shewarma	TOP	SAFE	SAFE	SAFE	SAFE	SAFE	Runner-up
Maria Cristina	SAFE	WIN	TOP	SAFE	SAFE	SAFE	Runner-up
Barbie-Q	SAFE	SAFE	WIN	SAFE	SAFE	ELIM	Guest
Lady Gagita	SAFE	SAFE	SAFE	WIN	SAFE	ELIM	Guest
Aries Night	DDW	SAFE	SAFE	SAFE	TOP	ELIM	Guest
O-A	SAFE	SAFE	SAFE	SAFE	WIN	ELIM	Guest
Pura Luka Vega	SAFE	SAFE	SAFE	SAFE	SAFE	ELIM	Guest

=== Rankings ===
Progress of contestants including rank in each episode
Rank	Round						Final Ranking	Total Points
Rank	1	2	3	4	5	6	Final Ranking	Total Points
1	Shewarma	Maria Cristina	Maria Cristina; Barbie-Q	Lady Gagita	O-A; Aries Night	Barbie-Q; Aries Night	Maria Cristina; Naia; Shewarma	— (Note: The total points for the top three finalists were not shown from the series.)
2	Lady Gagita	Naia	Maria Cristina; Barbie-Q	Shewarma	O-A; Aries Night	Barbie-Q; Aries Night	Maria Cristina; Naia; Shewarma	—
3	O-A	Aries Night	Naia	Maria Cristina	Naia	Naia	Maria Cristina; Naia; Shewarma	—
4	Maria Cristina	Pura Luka Vega	Pura Luka Vega; Shewarma	Naia	Pura Luka Vega	Shewarma	Barbie-Q	90.2
5	Pura Luka Vega	Lady Gagita	Pura Luka Vega; Shewarma	Pura Luka Vega	Barbie-Q	O-A	Lady Gagita	90.14
6	Aries Night	Barbie-Q	Lady Gagita	Barbie-Q	Lady Gagita	Lady Gagita	Aries Night	87.53
7	Barbie-Q	Shewarma	O-A	O-A	Shewarma	Maria Cristina	O-A	87.43
8	Naia	O-A	Aries Night	Aries Night	Maria Cristina	Pura Luka Vega	Pura Luka Vega	87.2

== Guest judges ==
Guest judges are known as the "Drag Enforcer" in the series. Guest judges are listed in chronological order.

- Catriona Gray, model and Miss Universe 2018
- K Brosas, actress and comedian
- Eula Valdez, actress
- KZ Tandingan, singer and rapper
- Francis Libiran, architect and fashion designer
- Antoinette Jadaone, filmmaker and podcaster
- Mela Habijan, model and Miss Trans Global 2020

=== Special guests ===
Guests who appeared in episodes, but not judge on the main stage.

Episode 8:

- Mama Bobby, drag queen
- Mama Let-Let, drag queen
- Mama Pie, drag queen

== Episodes ==
No. overall	No. in season	Title	Original release date
1	1	"Drag Raid"	8 December 2022
Eight drag queens entered an underground "drag den" in the first episode, where they were greeted by Sassa Gurl, the "Drag Runner", and Nicole Cordoves, the "Drag Dealer". As soon as everyone is present, Manila Luzon, who is dressed as a "Drag Lord", emerges and greets her competitors to the competition, and explains its guidelines. The drag queens are instructed to participate in a "Themewear Drag Test" during which they are judged based on their theme attire. The contestants in this episode of Themewear Drag Test are showcasing their Pinoy National Symbols looks.: Aries Night as Golly the Dog; Barbie-Q as Sampaguita Rock; Lady Gagita as Pharma Lee; Maria Cristina as Perlas Yarn; Naia as Wham Pipti; O-A as TT Modax; Pura Luka Vega as Arlington Paz; Shewarma as Cara Bow; The "Drag Cartel" instructs its competitors to display their distinctive drag from Philippine festivals for the "Main Drag Showdown", where the category is Philippine National Costume after they have demonstrated their Themewear Drag Test. Shewarma was named the Main Drag Showdown winner by Manila Luzon. Shewarma was informed that in order to participate in the fight in the "Dragdagulan", she had to choose an opponent. Shewarma decides to battle against Aries Night in the Dragdagulan. She was unfortunately defeated after losing to her opponent. However, in a surprising turn of events, Manila Luzon declared that no contestant will be eliminated from the competition.: Drag Enforcer: Catriona Gray; Themewear Drag Test: Pinoy National Symbols; Main Drag Showdown: Showcase outfits inspired by festivals celebrated throughout the Philippines.; Main Drag Showdown Winner: Shewarma; Dragdagulan Opponent: Aries Night; Dragdagulan Winner: Aries Night; Winner's Advantage for Next Episode: Can choose a partner for the next episode, and assign the other contestants their partners.
2	2	"Drag Trippin'"	15 December 2022
The rankings from the first episode were revealed by Sassa Gurl after the queens reunite together in Drag Den. It was revealed that Shewarma was given first place and Naia was given last place. Following the announcement of the rankings, the competitors engaged in a mini-challenge in which they teased one another by saying, "I got a text!" According to Sassa Gurl, the category for the contestants' mini-challenge is: Pinoy Novelty Songs.: Aries Night as Goodmorning Chuper; Barbie-Q as Sexbomb Luningning; Lady Gagita as Joleni Magdangal; Maria Cristina as Fely Moan; Naia as April Gurl; O-A as Annie Bato't Bakal; Pura Luka Vega as Talikod-Jenny; Shewarma as Kikay Kipay; After showcasing their Themewear Drag Test, the queens reunite on the runway where Manila Luzon announced the Main Drag Showdown. The contestants must perform in pairs to demonstrate their skills in a comedic sketch on politics. With Aries Night earning an advantage in the last episode, she assigned her competitors in pairs. As they enter the Drag Den, Nicole Cordoves and K Brosas talk with the competitors and offer tips for the comedic sketch in the Main Drag Showdown. Following the performance of the comedic sketches, many partners received positive criticisms from the judges. The judges chose Maria Christina and Naia as the winners of the Main Drag Showdown, though in the guidelines of the series they can choose one winner for the Dragdagulan. Maria Christina was selected for the Dragdagulan with Naia as her opponent. After battling, Maria Christina won the Dragdagulan.: Drag Enforcer: K Brosas; Themewear Drag Test: Pinoy Novelty Songs; Main Drag Showdown: Prepare a comedic sketch inspired by Philippine politics in pairs.; Main Drag Showdown Winner: Maria Christina; Dragdagulan Opponent: Naia; Dragdagulan Winner: Maria Christina; Winner's Advantage for Next Episode: Can decide the order of contestants on the next performance.
3	3	"Dangerous Drags"	22 December 2022
Sassa Gurl reveals the rankings from the second episode while the drag queens are back in Drag Den. Maria Christina ranks in first place with O-A ranking in last place. After revealing the ranks, one of the competitors began to open their difficulties to their rival, and they both made amends in the show. Sassa Gurl announced the Themewear Drag Test which is Pinoy Kontrabida which highlights the competitors' wicked and villainous side. The Drag Runner put the competitors into pairs so they could create their appearances for one another.: Aries Night as Rubi Rubi; Barbie-Q as Daniella Mungdragon; Lady Gagita as Lavinia Copycat; Maria Cristina as Valentina Moran; Naia as Georgia Ferrero; O-A as BB. Vivora; Pura Luka Vega as Soraya Montenegro; Shewarma as Mx. Minchin; After the contestants have displayed their Themewear Drag Test outfits, the Drag Lord announces the competitors' Main Drag Showdown, where they need to display their looks inspired by urban legends, mythology, or horror stories from the Philippines. When the contestants go back to the workroom, the Drag Dealer and the Drag Enforcer visit them and give advice on the contestants' looks. After showcasing the contestants' looks for the main challenge, they listened to the judges' comments. Maria Christina and Barbie-Q were declared the winners of the Main Drag Showdown in this episode by Manila Luzon due to a tiebreaker. Both winners were informed by Luzon that they must participate in the Dragdagulan in order to determine the challenge's winner.: Drag Enforcer: Eula Valdez; Themewear Drag Test: Pinoy Kontrabida; Main Drag Showdown: Showcase evil and/or mythical creatures from Filipino folklore and urban legends.; Main Drag Showdown Winners: Maria Christina and Barbie-Q; Dragdagulan Winner: Barbie-Q; Winner's Advantage for Next Episode: Can choose their role in the next episode's musical challenge.
4	4	"High On Drags"	29 December 2022
Sassa Gurl reveals the rankings from the second episode while the drag queens are back in Drag Den. Maria Christina and Barbie-Q rank in joint first place with Aries Night ranking in last place. Sassa Gurl announced the Themewear Drag Test which is Pinoy Fantasy Character which highlights the competitors' magical and creative side.: Aries Night as Agua Bendita; Barbie-Q as Marinar; Lady Gagita as Pang'he Pinera; Maria Cristina as Ravenal; Naia as Dyesebel Kama; O-A as Kampanerang Kupal; Pura Luka Vega as Parimanoka; Shewarma as Blusang Jitin; After the contestants have displayed their Themewear Drag Test outfits, the Drag Lord announces the competitors' Main Drag Showdown, where they need to work as groups of four to present a superhero-inspired talent show. The first team consists of Barbie-Q, Lady Gagita, Naia, and Pura Luka Vega while the second team consists of Aries Night, Maria Cristina, O-A, and Shewarma. When the contestants go back to the workroom, the Drag Dealer and the Drag Enforcer visit them and give advice on the contestants' looks. After showcasing the contestants' looks for the main challenge, they listened to the judges' comments. Team 2 is declared the best team of the week, but Lady Gagita is announced as the overall winner of the two challenges. Lady Gagita chooses Aries Night as her opponent for the Dragdagulan and Lady Gagita wins the battle.: Drag Enforcer: KZ Tandingan; Themewear Drag Test: Pinoy Fantasy Characters; Main Drag Showdown: Perform at a talent show in groups of four.; Main Drag Showdown Winner: Lady Gagita; Dragdagulan Opponent: Aries Night; Dragdagulan Winner: Lady Gagita; Winner's Advantage for Next Episode: TBA
5	5	"Drag Mafia"	5 January 2023
Drag Enforcer: Francis Libiran; Themewear Drag Test: Pinoy Holidays; Main Drag Showdown: Showcasing attire that the queens would like to wear at their wedding.; Main Drag Showdown Winner: Maria Cristina and O-A; Dragdagulan Opponent: Pura Luka Vega; Dragdagulan Winner: O-A; Winner's Advantage for Next Episode: Given extra time for speech on the next round.
6	6	"Drag is Political"	12 January 2023
Aries Night as Gising; Barbie-Q as Jennifer Louder; Lady Gagita as Cancel Cancel Culture; Maria Cristina as U = U; Naia as The Rebel Woman; O-A as U Kay?; Pura Luka Vega as Gun Violence; Shewarma as Stop Killing Farmers; Drag Enforcer: Antoinette Jadaone and Mela Habijan; Themewear Drag Test: Pinoy Protest Fashion; Main Drag Showdown: Showcase drag looks reminiscent of influential female figures in their lives.; Main Drag Showdown Winner: Aries Night and Barbie-Q; Eliminated: Pura Luka Vega, O-A, and Lady Gagita; Eliminated: Barbie-Q and Aries Night; Top Three: Maria Cristina, Naia, Shewarma
7	7	"#DragOutSpecial"	19 January 2023
This episode takes a look back at how the series began. Including audition tapes from the queens that did and didn't make it to the show, unaired clips, and discovering the struggles and triumphs of the eight contestants.
8	8	"Drag Encounter"	26 January 2023
Lip Sync Song: "Kilometro" by Sarah Geronimo; Runners-up: Shewarma and Maria Cristina; Winner of Drag Den Season One: Naia
