= Naia Black =

Filipino drag performer (born 1998)

- Naia Black in 2023
- Born: Timothy Brian Black; Las Piñas, Metro Manila, Philippines
- Education: University of the Philippines Diliman
- Occupation: Drag queen
- Years active: 2022–present
- Television: Drag Den (season 1)

Timothy Brian Black, better known as Naia Black or mononymously as Naia, is a Filipino drag performer. She (Note: Black's pronouns are he/him. However, when he performs as Naia Black, the pronouns are she/her. This article uses both sets of pronouns accordingly.) is best known for winning the first season of Drag Den and was crowned as "The Philippines' First Drag Supreme".

== Career ==
While attending college at University of the Philippines Diliman, Black first discovered drag from watching the American reality series, RuPaul's Drag Race. Originally, he considered the name "Tanya Sativa" before choosing "Naia Black" as his drag name.

=== Drag Den ===
I only came here with love and passion for drag... I hope that my story inspires young queer artists who are afraid of putting themselves out there, because I was afraid. But thank you, Manila, for giving this platform because I was able to prove that growth is what you need to become the next Drag Supreme.

— Naia Black, thanking Manila Luzon for inspiring her, in a Manila Bulletin interview.

On 17 November 2022, she was revealed as one of the contestants competing in the first season of Drag Den. Despite never winning a challenge, she was in the finale with Shewarma and Maria Cristina. In the finale episode, she had to compete in three rounds and a lip-sync battle to Sarah Geronimo's "Kilometro" (2014). On the night of the finale, Naia was crowned by Manila Luzon at a viewing party in Taguig, as "Filipino's First Drag Supreme". She received a cash prize of ₱1,000,000, a one-year supply of Téviant Beauty cosmetics, and an "all-inclusive" trip to Palawan, Philippines.

In June 2023, Naia Black was invited as a guest speaker for a TEDx conference, at the Ateneo de Manila University, to discuss the "significance of embracing one's authentic self and the power of non-conformity."

== Personal life ==
Black is gay, and uses the pronoun he/him out of drag and she/her in drag. He also set charity events to "raise funds for HIV research and awareness" in the Philippines.

== Discography ==
=== Promotional singles ===
List of promotional singles, showing the year released, and album name
Title	Year	Album	Ref.
"May Kapa" with the cast of Drag Den (season 1)	2023	Non-album promotional single	

== Filmography ==
=== Film ===
List of film credits
Year	Title	Role	Notes	Ref.
2023	Third World Romance	Trixie		

=== Television ===
List of television credits
Year	Title	Role	Notes	Ref.
2022	Drag Den	Herself/Contestant	Season 1 — Winner	
2023	Drag Den	Herself/Judge/Guest	Season 2 — "Kalyeah Culture"	
2023	Drag Den	Herself/Judge/Guest	Season 2 — "Reyna ng Gabi"	

== Awards and nominations ==
Name of the award ceremony, year presented, category, nominee(s) of the award, and the result of the nomination
Award	Year	Category	Recipient(s) and nominee(s)	Result	Ref.
Nylon Manila Big Bold Brave Awards	2023	Gen Z Approved Drag Queen	Naia	Nominated	

== Notes ==
Awards and achievements
Preceded by Inaugural	Winner of Drag Den Philippines; Season 1 (2022–2023)	Succeeded by Deja
