= Toni Fowler =

Filipino social media personality (born 1993)

- Born: Tonimari Bauto Fowler
- Other names: Mommy/Mami Oni, Toni
- Occupations: Actress; rapper; social media personality
- Years active: 2012–present
- Children: 2
- Relatives: Mari "Milk" Fowler (sister)

Tonimari Bauto Fowler is a Filipino actress, rapper, songwriter and social media personality. Besides appearances on her social media profiles, Fowler also pursued a career in mainstream show business where she portrayed the role of Chicky in FPJ's Batang Quiapo.

== Personal life ==
Fowler has one daughter and one son.

== Controversy ==
Fowler, who is dubbed by critics as the Philippines' equivalent to Cardi B, gained viral notoriety and controversy for her sexually-charged content particularly in her music videos, most notably the single "M.P.L. (Malibog Pag Lasing)" (lit. 'Horny When Drunk'); which was also criticised for its alleged objectification of women bordering towards fetishism and pornography.

Fowler maintains that the videos are only intended for adults and are set as age-restricted on her YouTube channel, later stating in an interview with One News PH that "Malibog Pag Lasing" was drawn from her real-life experiences; despite this, she faced an arrest warrant over alleged violations of the Cybercrime Prevention Act of 2012 in relation to her music videos following a complaint by the Kapisanan ng Social Media Broadcasters ng Pilipinas (KSMBP) on obscenity grounds. Drag queen Pura Luka Vega–who was also previously arrested for alleged blasphemy law violations in 2023 over a drag performance as Jesus Christ–defended Fowler's right to self-expression in a post on X (formerly Twitter), stating "Why are we going after people who are expressing themselves through their art?"

Following controversy over her reputation for her sexually-charged music, Fowler released the song "Pribado" (lit. 'Private') featuring Tito Vince & Papi Galang on October 31, 2025. In contrast to her previous singles which were aimed at mature audiences, "Pribado" is billed as a nursery rhyme intended to educate children about child sexual abuse, consent and parental supervision. Although the song made explicit mentions of Tagalog slang terms for genitalia, it received mostly positive critical reception with netizens praising Fowler for tackling a sensitive topic involving minors.

== Filmography ==
=== Television ===
Year	Title	Role	Notes
2016	A1 Ko Sa 'Yo	Gemma	
2023	FPJ's Batang Quiapo	Chicky	Recurring role; 59 episodes
2024–present	It's Showtime	Herself	Guest performer

== Discography ==
Year	Title	Notes
2022	"FF"	Featuring Makagago
2023	"M.P.L (Malibog Pag Lasing)"	Featuring Freshbreed
2023	"M.N.M (Masarap Na Mommy)"	Featuring Freshbreed
2023	"SUS"	Featuring Mari "Milk" Fowler
2025	"k4ToRz3h"	Featuring Tito Vince
2025	"Pribado"	Featuring Tito Vince & Papi Galang

== See also ==
- Exploitation of women in mass media
- "Justify My Love" – a 1990 single by Madonna whose music video generated similar controversy for its sexually charged content
