= Asian Academy Creative Award for Best Non Scripted Entertainment =

Award for outstanding reality entertainment program

- Awarded for: Best reality entertainment program
- Country: Asia–Pacific region
- Presented by: Asian Academy Creative Awards
- First award: 2018
- Currently held by: Physical: 100 (2023)
- Website: asianacademycreativeawards.com

This is a list of the winners of the Asian Academy Creative Award for Best Non-Scripted Entertainment since its inception in 2018. Apart from the main award, the category is also awarded regionally in seventeen participating nations.

== Winners ==
The following table display the winners of the award.

Year	Program	Network	Country	Ref.
2018	The Remix	Amazon Prime Video	India	
2019	World's Got Talent	Hunan TV	China	
2020	Man vs. Wild with Bear Grylls and Prime Minister Modi	Discovery Channel	India	
2021	The Apprentice: ONE Championship Edition	Netflix	Singapore	
2022	Eurovision – Australia Decides 2022	SBS	Australia	
2023	Physical: 100	Netflix	South Korea	

=== Regional winners ===
The following table display the winners of the regional award, sorted by the participating nations.

==== Australia ====
Year	Program	Network
2018	MasterChef Australia	Channel 10
2019	MasterChef Australia	Network 10
2020	Gogglebox Australia	Network 10
2022	Eurovision – Australia Decides 2022	SBS
2023	Gogglebox Australia	Network 10

==== China ====
Year	Program	Network
2018	Street Dance of China	Youku
2019	World's Got Talent	Hunan TV
2020	The Great Wall	Mango TV
2021	Theatre for Living	iQIYI
2022	Action	iQIYI
2023	The Cosmos of Artists	Hunan TV

==== Hong Kong ====
Year	Program	Network
2018	入住請敲門 – The Haunted Rooms	ViuTV
2019	Record Rides	National Geographic
2020	Extreme Treks	BBC Worldwide
2021	Expedition: Asia	Discovery Channel
2022	Dawn in the Sunset	ViuTV
2023	Hong Kong Super Pet Model Contest	TVB

==== India ====
Year	Program	Network
2018	The Remix	Amazon Prime Video
2019	Masters of Taste – The Family Table	National Geographic
2020	Man vs. Wild with Bear Grylls and Prime Minister Modi	Discovery Channel
2021	Cruising Legends: Dawn Patrol	MX Player
2022	Into the Wild with Bear Grylls and Ajay Devgan	Discovery Channel
2023	The Romantics	Netflix

==== Indonesia ====
Year	Program	Network
2023	The Bachelor Indonesia	HBO Asia

==== Japan ====
Year	Program	Network
2019	Beat the Rooms	Nippon TV
2021	Cosplay Japan	Turner Japan
2022	Love Is Blind: Japan	Netflix

==== Malaysia ====
Year	Program	Network
2018	Dreamcatchers	ABS-CBN
2019	Call Me Handsome	Astro AEC
2021	A Grey Area	Astro AEC
2023	The Sandbox	Astro

==== Philippines ====
Year	Program	Network
2019	StarStruck	GMA Network
2020	Your Moment	ABS-CBN
2021	Sing Galing!	TV5
2022	Sing Galing!	TV5
2023	Drag Den	Amazon Prime Video

==== Singapore ====
Year	Program	Network
2018	GeTai Challenge	Channel 8
2019	Ed Stafford: First Man Out	Discovery Channel
2020	Ed Stafford: First Man Out	Discovery Channel
2021	The Apprentice: ONE Championship Edition	Netflix
2022	Dishing with Chris Lee	Mediacorp
2023	The Star Athlete	Mediacorp

==== South Korea ====
Year	Program	Network
2018	Youn's Kitchen	tvN
2019	Restaurant on Wheel	tvN
2020	Three Meals a Day	tvN
2021	Youn's Stay	tvN
2022	Single's Inferno	Netflix
2023	Physical: 100	Netflix

==== Taiwan ====
Year	Program	Network
2019	Three Piglets	PTS

==== Thailand ====
Year	Program	Network
2018	The Face Men Thailand	Channel 3
2019	10 Fight 10	Workpoint TV
2020	Sing for the Stars	Workpoint TV
2021	The Wall Duet	Workpoint TV
2022	Market Feud	Workpoint TV
2023	The Masterpiece	Workpoint TV

==== Vietnam ====
Year	Program	Network
2019	The Face Vietnam	VTV9
2022	The Next Face Vietnam	Facebook Watch
2023	Let's Feast Vietnam	Netflix
