= Pura Luka Vega =

Filipino drag performer (born 1990)

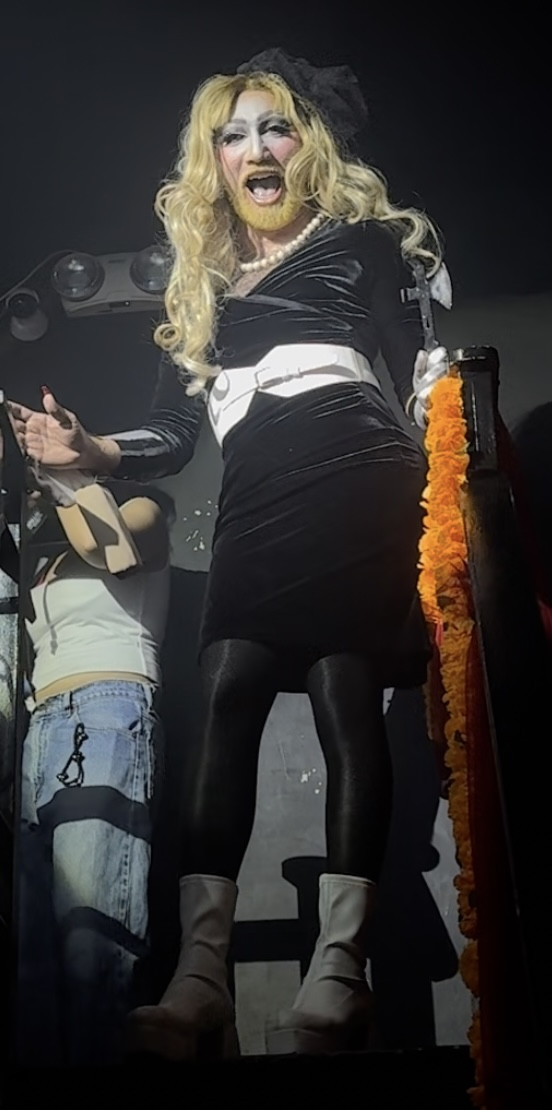
- Pura Luka Vega dressed in drag as Sabrina Carpenter for Halloween 2024.
- Born: Amadeus Fernando Magallanes Pagente; February 27, 1990 (age 35)
- Education: Philippine Normal University (BA); De La Salle University (MA)
- Occupations: Drag performer; teacher; researcher
- Years active: 2017–present
- Notable work: Ama Namin drag performance (2023)
- Television: Drag Den (contestant; season 1)

Amadeus Fernando Magallanes Pagente (born February 27, 1990), better known by their stage name Pura Luka Vega, is a Filipino drag performer. They (Note: Pagente's does not identify with any gender label, but prefers the pronouns they/them. This article uses they/them for consistency.) were a Drag Den contestant. In 2023, they came into public attention for a drag performance dressed as Jesus Christ to the tune of a remix of the Tagalog language version of the Lord's Prayer.

== Early life and education ==
They were born as Amadeus Fernando Pagente to a Filipino mother and a British father. They grew up in Dipolog, Zamboanga del Norte. In high school, they began to become aware of their queer identity but did not feel any strong attraction towards any specific sex so they had a typical experience for a teenager. Luka would move to Manila to attend the Philippine Normal University, where they took up education as their undergraduate course.

After graduating from the Philippine Normal University, they would return to Dipolog where they taught for four years. They would return to Manila to study at the De La Salle University to pursue a master's degree.

== Drag career ==
=== 2017–2022: Early years and style ===
Pagente's exposure to drag began when they were attending college in Manila, and started doing drag after they first saw a female cosplayer dressed up as the Joker. They explored their gender by doing female impersonations and reading children's books to kids. A year later they joined a competition which they won while dressing up as Marie Antoinette with a severed head – they consider this event as their debut in drag.

They would join the Nectar Nightclub Drag Cartel in October 2017. Luka initially did not have a beard, but started sporting one to challenge the conventional drag standards and believes it's not restricted to just one gender. They also believe in the stance that "drag is political", that practicing artform is inherently expressing a political statement. Their drag name comes from the name of beauty queen Pura Villanueva Kalaw, a Tagalog word luka-luka which means crazy, and the name of singer Suzanne Vega.

On November 17, 2022, Luka was revealed as one of the contestants competing in the first season of Drag Den. Despite never winning a challenge, they finished last in the competition with 87.2 as their final score of the series, and was given the consolation prize of "Miss Fortune Award" or "Ranked Last But Still Served" at the end of the series.

=== 2023–present: Legal issues ===
In mid-2023, Luka's performance of a rock remix of "Ama Namin" (transl. Our Father) song while in a Jesus-inspired outfit in a bar was subject to controversy. Luka claimed that they did the performance as a means to challenge the notion of "praise and worship" and not intended as an act of blasphemy. The Catholic Bishops' Conference of the Philippines saw the performance as "bordering" profanity, blasphemy and sacrilege, iterating its stance that "religious symbols and imagery are not for entertainment purposes". The Philippines for Jesus Movement, a coalition of Christian groups, on their part filed charges against them for alleged violation of the Revised Penal Code and Cybercrime Prevention Act.

Nevertheless, Christian church religious leaders, some members of the Senate, and a number of LGBTQIA+ groups in the Philippines condemned the act as blasphemous, while eighteen local government units (Floridablanca, Pampanga; General Santos; Toboso, Negros Occidental; Manila; Bukidnon; Laguna; Cagayan de Oro; Nueva Ecija; Cebu City, Cebu; the Dinagat Islands; Occidental Mindoro; Lucena, Quezon; Bohol; Mandaue, Cebu; Palawan; Oriental Mindoro; Apalit, Pampanga, and Malolos, Bulacan; in respective order) have declared Luka as a persona non grata.

Luka has shrugged off the persona non grata declarations and made a drag performance revolving around it. They sang "Look What You Made Me Do" by Taylor Swift while in Black Nazarene-themed attire. They maintained that the separation of church and state must be upheld. The drag performer started a fundraiser from their supporters to cover their expenses in their pending legal cases as a result of the controversy.

On October 4, 2023, Luka was arrested by the Manila PNP acting on a complaint by the Hijos del Nazareno. The arrest was regarding their case involving "immoral doctrines, obscene publications and exhibitions and indecent shows", in breach of Article 201 of the Criminal Code. Human Rights Watch accused Philippine authorities of violating Luka's right to free expression, and called for charges against them to be dropped and for them to be released from custody. They faced new criminal raps in violation of Article 133 ("acts notoriously offensive to the feelings of the faithful") of the Revised Penal Code filed against them by Kapisanan ng Social Media Broadcasters ng Pilipinas, Inc. in October of the same year. On February 29, 2024, Luka was arrested for six counts of Violation of Article 201 (immoral doctrines, obscene publications and exhibition, and indecent shows) of the Revised Penal Code in relation to the Cybercrime Prevention Act of 2012 after losing a Quezon City court suit with the Philippines for Jesus, a sectarian movement founded by pastor Eddie Villanueva.

On June 10, 2025, Luka was acquitted by the Manila Regional Trial Court Branch 84 of violating Article 201, which cited the fact that Luka did not upload the video of their performance and could not be held liable as such under the Cybercrime Prevention Act. At the same time, Luka was asked by the court to be "circumspect" in their performances.

In July 2025, during a controversy involving the online misgendering of Awra Briguela, Luka urged the public to respect pronouns, arguing that accidental misgendering can be corrected, but deliberately doing it is unacceptable.

== Personal life ==
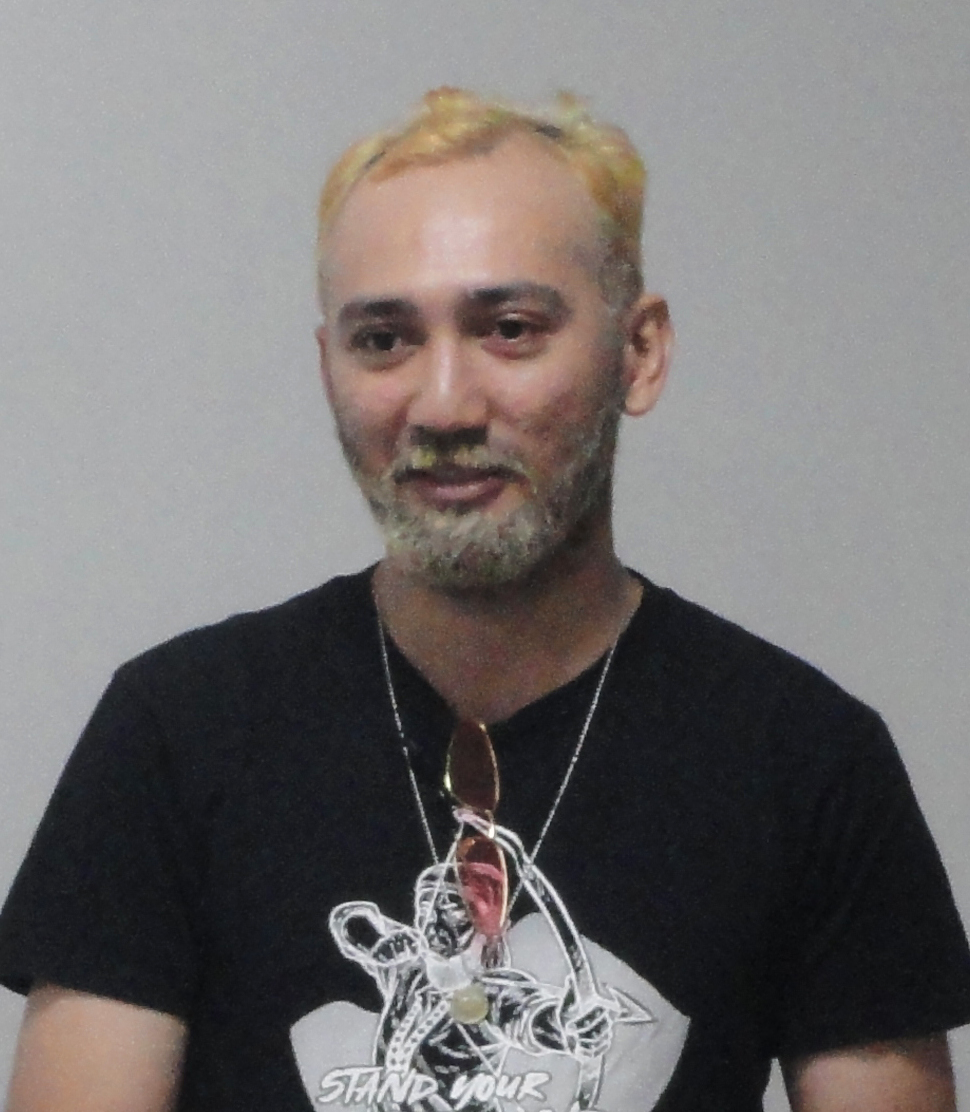
Pagente (out of drag) in 2024

Pagente does not identify with any gender label, saying that the closest label for themselves is non-binary. They consider themselves as gender nonconforming or gender apathetic, and prefers they/them pronouns but uses any. Luka identifies as a Roman Catholic but "not religious". In Drag Den, they expressed dissent against the idea "that the LGBTQIA+ community will go to hell for being gay" insisting that if "Jesus was alive, he would love everyone".

== Discography ==
=== Promotional singles ===
List of promotional singles, showing the year released, and album name
Title	Year	Album	Ref.
"May Kapa" with the cast of Drag Den (season 1)	2023	Non-album promotional single	

== Filmography ==
=== Television ===
List of television credits
Year	Title	Role	Notes	Ref.
2022	Drag Den (season 1)	Themselves/Contestant	8th place	
2023	Mudrakels	Themselves/Contestant		
2024	Drag Den (season 2)	Themselves/Judge	Drag Agent	

== See also ==
- Offending religious feelings (Philippines)
- 2024 Summer Olympics opening ceremony Festivité performance
