= Drag Den season 2 =

Second season of Drag Den

Drag Den
- Season 2
- Promotional poster for season two.
- Hosted by: Manila Luzon
- Judges: Manila Luzon; Sassa Gurl; Nicole Cordoves
- No. of contestants: 10

Release
- Original network: Amazon Prime Video
- Original release: 18 January – 7 March 2024

Season chronology
- ← Previous; Season 1

The second season of Drag Den premiered on 18 January 2024, through Amazon Prime Video. The second season showcased a total of ten contestants competing for the title of the "Filipino's Next Drag Supreme".

Casting calls for the season were opened in April 2023, and the cast was officially revealed in a teaser trailer in December 2023.

== Production ==
Throughout social media, Amazon Prime Video joined the trend involving promotional material from the film, Barbie (2023). They posted an image of Manila Luzon's doll, with the tagline: "May pasabog na announcement ang doll na 'to very soon." Fans speculated that the show is yet to announce a season two. On 14 April 2023, the streaming service announced the renewal of the reality competition series. Manila Luzon and Rod Singh announced a casting call for season two on social media. The casting call was open until 30 April 2023.

== Format ==
Contestants are instructed to participate in two challenges in the series. The judges will critique based on both challenges and choose their winner. Before they announce the highest-ranking contestant, the Drag Lord chooses three names from fate and they will participate in the Dragdagulan. The winner of the lip-sync challenge will gain immunity and have the opportunity to give to the lowest-ranking contestant from elimination.

== Promotion ==
On 1 December 2023, Sassa Gurl, Nicole Cordoves, and Manila Luzon came back as the judging panel for the second season. Additionally, it revealed the official premiere date, which is slated for 18 January 2024, and will be available through Amazon Prime Video. On 7 December 2023, ten contestants were shown in the new trailer heading down the new set of the series.

Manila Luzon announced a song collaboration with Sassa Gurl. They released the new official theme song of the series named, "Pom Pom (Take Me High)" on 12 January 2024, through Republic Records Philippines. The streaming service held a grand opening night at Ayala Malls Trinoma, on 17 January in celebration of the second season. It featured a red carpet, a media conference, and performances.

== Contestants ==
Ages, names, and cities stated are at time of filming.

Contestants from the second season of Drag Den and their backgrounds
Contestant	Age	Hometown	Outcome
Deja	22	Baguio, Benguet	Winner
Mrs. Tan	23	Laguna, Calabarzon	Runners-up
Moi (Note: Moi Taura is referred to as Moi on the show.)	22	Bacolod, Negros Occidental	Runners-up
Feyvah Fatalé	24	Bulacan, Central Luzon	4th place
Russia Fox	38	Daraga, Albay	4th place
Margaux (Note: Margaux Bertrand is referred to as Margaux on the show.)	24	Tondo, Metro Manila	6th place
Jean Vilogue	21	Batangas City, Batangas	7th place
Elvira	22	Quezon City, Metro Manila	8th place
Marlyn (Note: Marlyn Ocampo is referred to as Marlyn on the show.)	27	Pasay, Metro Manila	9th place
Maria Lava	28	Mandaue, Cebu	10th place

== Contestant progress ==
Legend:

Deja won Drag Den season 2.
Mrs. Tan and Moi were the runners-up.
Russia Fox was voted Miss El Tocuyo (Miss ET).
WIN indicates that the contestant was the highest in the ranking and won both the main challenge and the lip sync.
TOP indicates that the contestant was the highest in the ranking and won the main challenge, but lost the lip sync.
DDW (Dragdagulan winner) indicates that the contestant was chosen by fate and won the lip sync challenge.
SAFE indicates that the contestant was declared safe by the judges.
IMM (Immunity) indicates that the contestant was the lowest in the ranking, but was given immunity from the lip sync winner.
BTM (Bottom) indicates that the contestant was one of the lowest in the ranking and was up for elimination.
ELIM (Eliminated) indicates that the contestant one of the lowest in the ranking and was eliminated.
Guest indicates that the contestant returned as a guest.

Progress of contestants including placements in each episode
Contestant	Episode						
Contestant	1	2	3	4	5	6	8
Deja	TOP	SAFE	SAFE	SAFE	TOP	SAFE	Winner
Mrs. Tan	SAFE	DDW	SAFE	WIN	DDW	SAFE	Runner-up
Moi	SAFE	SAFE	SAFE	IMM	SAFE	TOP	Runner-up
Feyvah Fatalé	SAFE	TOP	DDW	BTM	IMM	ELIM	Guest
Russia Fox	SAFE	SAFE	TOP	SAFE	SAFE	ELIM	Miss ET
Margaux	SAFE	BTM	IMM	SAFE	ELIM		Guest
Jean Vilogue	SAFE	BTM	SAFE	ELIM			Guest
Elvira	DDW	SAFE	ELIM				Guest
Marlyn	BTM	ELIM					Guest
Maria Lava	ELIM						Guest

=== Rankings ===
Progress of contestants including rank in each episode
Rank	Round						
Rank	1	2	3	4	5	6	Final
1	Deja	Feyvah Fatalé	Russia Fox	Mrs. Tan	Deja	Moi	Deja
2	Russia Fox	Russia Fox	Mrs. Tan	Russia Fox	Russia Fox	Mrs. Tan	Moi; Mrs. Tan
3	Mrs. Tan	Mrs. Tan	Moi	Margaux	Moi	Deja	Moi; Mrs. Tan
4	Margaux	Deja	Deja	Deja	Mrs. Tan	Feyvah Fatalé; Russia Fox	
5	Feyvah Fatalé	Moi	Feyvah Fatalé	Moi	Margaux	Feyvah Fatalé; Russia Fox	
6	Moi	Elvira	Jean Vilogue	Feyvah Fatalé	Feyvah Fatalé		
7	Jean Vilogue	Jean Vilogue	Margaux	Jean Vilogue			
8	Marlyn	Margaux	Elvira				
9	Maria Lava	Marlyn					
10	Elvira						

== Guest judges ==
On 14 December 2023, the guest judges for this season were revealed. Guest judges are known as the "Drag Enforcer" in the series, and are listed in chronological order.

- Yeng Constantino, singer and songwriter
- Bini (Aiah, Mikha, Stacey), girl group
- Rufa Mae Quinto, actress and comedian
- Alaska Thunderfuck, American drag queen and singer
- Megan Young, actress, model, and beauty queen
- Alodia Gosiengfiao, cosplayer and singer
- Andrea Brillantes, actress and model
- Dolly de Leon, actress

=== Special guests ===
Guests who appeared in episodes, but not judge on the main stage.

Episode 8:

- Eva Papaya, drag queen
- Racing Chat, drag queen
- Jolina Padilla, drag queen
- Naia, winner on the first season of Drag Den

== Episodes ==
No. overall	No. in season	Title	Original release date
9	1	"Kalyeah Culture"	18 January 2024
Ten drag queens entered the new underground arcade in the first episode, greeted by Sassa Gurl, Nicole Cordoves, and Manila Luzon. The themewear for the first episode is TerNo? TerYasss! For the Main Drag Showdown, the queens write, record, and perform verses to "Sustah". The Drag Lord revealed that three queens would be chosen by fate to participate in the Dragdagulan and get a chance to win immunity; with the lowest ranking score will be eliminated in every episode. Elvira won the Dragdagulan lip-sync to "Sumayaw Ka" by Gloc-9, and keeps her immunity. Deja and Russia Fox received the highest rankings, with Deja winning the episode. Maria Lava and Marlyn received the lowest rank. Maria Lava was the first queen to be eliminated.: Drag Enforcers: Yeng Constantino and Mikha, Aiah and Stacey of Bini; Drag Agent: Naia; Themewear Drag Test: TerNo? TerYasss!; Main Drag Showdown: Write, record, and perform verses to "Sustah; Dragdagulan Opponents: Deja, Elvira, and Maria Lava; Lip-Sync Song: "Sumayaw Ka" by Gloc-9; Dragdagulan Winner: Elvira; Round One Winner: Deja; Showdown Prize: A ₱20,000 cash tip; Bottom Two: Maria Lava and Marlyn; Eliminated: Maria Lava
10	2	"Parlor Gayms"	25 January 2024
Nine drag queens entered the underground arcade, greeted by Sassa Gurl revealing episode one's rankings. She also revealed the themewear for the second episode, which is Pinoy Campyons. For the Main Drag Showdown, the queens perform a comedy-musical titled "Parlor Gay-mes". Mrs. Tan won the Dragdagulan lip-sync to "Morena" by Roxanne Barcelo, and kept her immunity. Feyvah Fatalé received the highest ranking and won the episode. Jean Vilogue, Margaux, and Marlyn received the lowest rankings. Marlyn was the second queen to be eliminated.: Drag Enforcer: Rufa Mae Quinto; Drag Agent: Pura Luka Vega; Themewear Drag Test: Pinoy Campyons; Main Drag Showdown: Perform a comedy-musical based on beauty parlors; Dragdagulan Opponents: Margaux, Marlyn, and Mrs. Tan; Lip-Sync Song: "Morena" by Roxanne Barcelo; Dragdagulan Winner: Mrs. Tan; Round Two Winner: Feyvah Fatalé; Showdown Prize: A ₱20,000 cash tip; Bottom Three: Jean Vilogue, Margaux, and Marlyn; Eliminated: Marlyn
11	3	"Patayin sa Sindaks"	1 February 2024
Eight drag queens entered the underground arcade with Sassa Gurl revealing episode two's rankings. She also announced the themewear for the third episode, which is Pinoy Supersti-Chos. For the Main Drag Showdown, the queens are dressed up in their given horror-version horoscopes to participate in a haunted house. Feyvah Fatalé won the Dragdagulan lip-sync to "Rampa" by Vice Ganda. Russia Fox received the highest ranking and won the episode. Elvira and Margaux received the lowest rankings; Feyvah Fatalé gave up her immunity to Margaux. Elvira was the third queen to be eliminated.: Drag Enforcer: Alaska Thunderfuck; Drag Agent: Aries Night; Themewear Drag Test: Pinoy Supersti-Chos; Main Drag Showdown: Create a horoscope-inspired look and participate in a haunted house; Dragdagulan Opponents: Feyvah Fatalé, Moi, and Russia Fox; Lip-Sync Song: "Rampa" by Vice Ganda; Dragdagulan Winner: Feyvah Fatalé; Round Three Winner: Russia Fox; Showdown Prize: A ₱20,000 cash tip; Bottom Two: Elvira and Margaux; Eliminated: Elvira
12	4	"Alien? Alien!"	8 February 2024
Seven drag queens entered the underground arcade, Sassa Gurl reveals episode three's rankings. She also revealed the themewear for the fourth episode, Queens of Animenia. For the Main Drag Showdown, the queens create an extraterrestrial life inspired look. Mrs. Tan won the Dragdagulan lip-sync to "Triangulo" by Thyro Alfaro, Yumi Lacsamana, and Jeric Medina. Mrs. Tan received the highest ranking and won the episode. Feyvah Fatalé, Jean Vilogue, and Moi received the lowest rankings; Mrs. Tan gave up her immunity to Moi. Jean Vilogue was the fourth queen to be eliminated.: Honorary Drag Dealer: Megan Young (Note: Nicole Cordoves was not on the judging panel for this episode.); Drag Enforcer: Alodia Gosiengfiao; Drag Agent: O-A; Themewear Drag Test: Queens of Animenia; Main Drag Showdown: Create an extraterrestrial life-like inspired look; Dragdagulan Opponents: Jean Vilogue, Margaux, and Mrs. Tan; Lip-Sync Song: "Triangulo" by Thyro Alfaro, Yumi Lacsamana, and Jeric Medina; Dragdagulan Winner: Mrs. Tan; Round Four Winner: Mrs. Tan; Showdown Prize: A ₱20,000 cash tip; Bottom Three: Feyvah Fatalé, Jean Vilogue, and Moi; Eliminated: Jean Vilogue
13	5	"Baks to School"	15 February 2024
Six drag queens entered the underground arcade, and Sassa Gurl revealed episode four's rankings and revealed the themewear for the fifth episode, Miss Intrams. For the Main Drag Showdown, the queens participate in JS prom with their loved ones. Mrs. Tan won the Dragdagulan lip-sync to "Di na Muli" by Janine Teñoso. Deja received the highest ranking and won the episode. Feyvah Fatalé, Margaux, and Mrs. Tan received the lowest rankings; Mrs. Tan gave up her immunity to Margaux, but declined it and ultimately ended up with Feyvah Fatalé. Margaux was the fifth queen to be eliminated.: Drag Enforcer: Andrea Brillantes; Drag Agent: Shewarma; Themewear Drag Test: Miss Intrams; Main Drag Showdown: Makeover a loved one for junior-senior prom; Dragdagulan Opponents: Feyvah Fatalé, Deja, and Mrs. Tan; Lip-Sync Song: "Di na Muli" by Janine Teñoso; Dragdagulan Winner: Mrs. Tan; Round Five Winner: Deja; Showdown Prize: A ₱20,000 cash tip; Bottom Three: Feyvah Fatalé, Margaux, and Mrs. Tan; Eliminated: Margaux
14	6	"Kakaibabe"	22 February 2024
Drag Enforcer: Dolly de Leon; Themewear Drag Test: Protest Fashion in Swimsuit; Main Drag Showdown: Hanasht Game; Round Six Winner: Moi; Showdown Prize: A ₱20,000 cash tip; Eliminated: Feyvah Fatalé and Russia Fox; Top Three: Deja, Moi, and Mrs. Tan
15	7	"Follow Up"	29 February 2024
This episode takes a look back at how the second season expanded with new rules and twists. Including audition tapes from the queens that did it to the series, unaired clips, and discovering the struggles and triumphs of the ten contestants.
16	8	"Reyna ng Gabi"	8 March 2024
Themewear Drag Test: A-Gay-Culture; Lip-Sync Song: "Miss Manila" by Angeline Quinto; Main Drag Showdown: Question and Answer; Runners-up: Mrs. Tan and Moi; Winner of Drag Den Season Two: Deja
