= Drag Den =

Philippine reality television series

- Genre: Reality competition
- Directed by: Rod Singh
- Presented by: Manila Luzon
- Judges: Manila Luzon; Nicole Cordoves; Sassa Gurl
- Country of origin: Philippines
- Original languages: English; Filipino / Tagalog
- No. of seasons: 2
- No. of episodes: 16

Production
- Executive producers: Antoinette Jadaone; Dan Villegas; Manila Luzon
- Producer: Rod Singh
- Camera setup: Multi-camera
- Running time: 45–65 minutes
- Production companies: Cornerstone Studios; Project 8 Projects

Original release
- Network: Amazon Prime Video
- Release: 8 December 2022 – 7 March 2024

Drag Den is a Philippine reality competition television series that documents drag queen Manila Luzon as host and head judge in search of the "Next Drag Supreme" for the Philippines. Every round, contestants are given different challenges to participate as they're judged by Manila Luzon, beauty pageant Nicole Cordoves, with comedian Sassa Gurl, alongside one or more guest judges, who critique their progress throughout the competition.

The television series first premiered on 8 December 2022 for Amazon Prime Video, and was met with critical acclaim. Rod Singh serves as the director and producer, along with Cornerstone Studios and Project 8 Projects. Manila Luzon is also credited as executive producer with cinematographers Antoinette Jadaone and Dan Villegas. The series was later renewed for a second season in April 2023, and premiered on 18 January 2024.

== Background ==
Manila Luzon grew up surrounded with Filipino pride and being influenced into doing drag with his name referencing the Philippine city Manila, Luzon. After rising to prominence for competing three times on American television series RuPaul's Drag Race, fans described the drag queen as "best-loved" for her witty humor. Manila Luzon later mentioned in an interview with Vice how outstanding the drag artists are in the Philippines such as Vice Ganda, and hopefully be involved in a Philippine adaptation of Drag Race. Three months later, the drag queen exclusively told Entertainment Weekly about an upcoming project taking place in the Philippines. Manila Luzon later revealed she is set to host and head judge reality competition series named Drag Den. The series' title is a play on "drug den", a term used colloquially in the country in reference to safehouses holding drug addicts.

== Episodes ==
Season	Contestants	Episodes	Originally released		Winner	Runner(s)-up
Season	Contestants	Episodes	First released	Last released	Winner	Runner(s)-up
1	8	8	8 December 2022	26 January 2023	Naia	Shewarma; Maria Cristina
2	10	8	18 January 2024	7 March 2024	Deja	Mrs. Tan; Moi

== Production ==
=== Development ===
Drag is still kind of underground here, so I'm excited to bring the Filipino audience and let them see underground and see the scene that's happening and to fall in love with these queens and to be inspired by their creativity, to be in awe of their beauty and their transformations, and so it's going to be like a pageant.

— Manila Luzon, introducing Drag Den to Mega Entertainment.

Rod Singh was announced as the director of the series, produced by Cornerstone Studios and Project 8 Projects. The series was later picked up by streaming media service Tencent Video, with auditions opening in August 2021. Manila Luzon expressed on X (formerly Twitter) that production showed her the finalized first episode in March 2022. Soon after, cinematographer Antoinette Jadaone praised the drag queen and announced herself as an executive producer for the series. After its short hiatus, streaming service Amazon Prime Video released a teaser trailer on 16 November 2022 with eight contestants competing.

Three months after the first season concluded, the series posted an image similar to the promotional material from American comedy film Barbie (2023), featuring a doll-like figure of Manila Luzon. Both the head judge and director announced the renewal of the series with auditions for season two opening in April. A teaser was later released on 1 December 2023 with the judging panel appearing in a new set, featuring ten contestants.

=== Auditions ===
The television series partnered with video-sharing platform TikTok and announced auditions were opened on 16 August 2022 with the deadline being on the last date of the month. A month later, a public vote was conducted online for three days named Call Beks, where fans decides which drag queen would be able to compete in for season one. The two participants Yudipota and Marlyn were shortlisted from competing, with O-A winning the fan-vote. With the renewal of season two, auditions were announced on YouTube and opened on 13 April 2023 with the deadline ending on the last date of the month.

There has been a total of eighteen contestants featured in two seasons of the reality series so far with Naia and Deja crowned as the Philippines' Next Drag Supreme. The series also welcomed its first openly trans woman contestant Barbie-Q, and its first cisgender woman Marlyn.

=== Judges ===
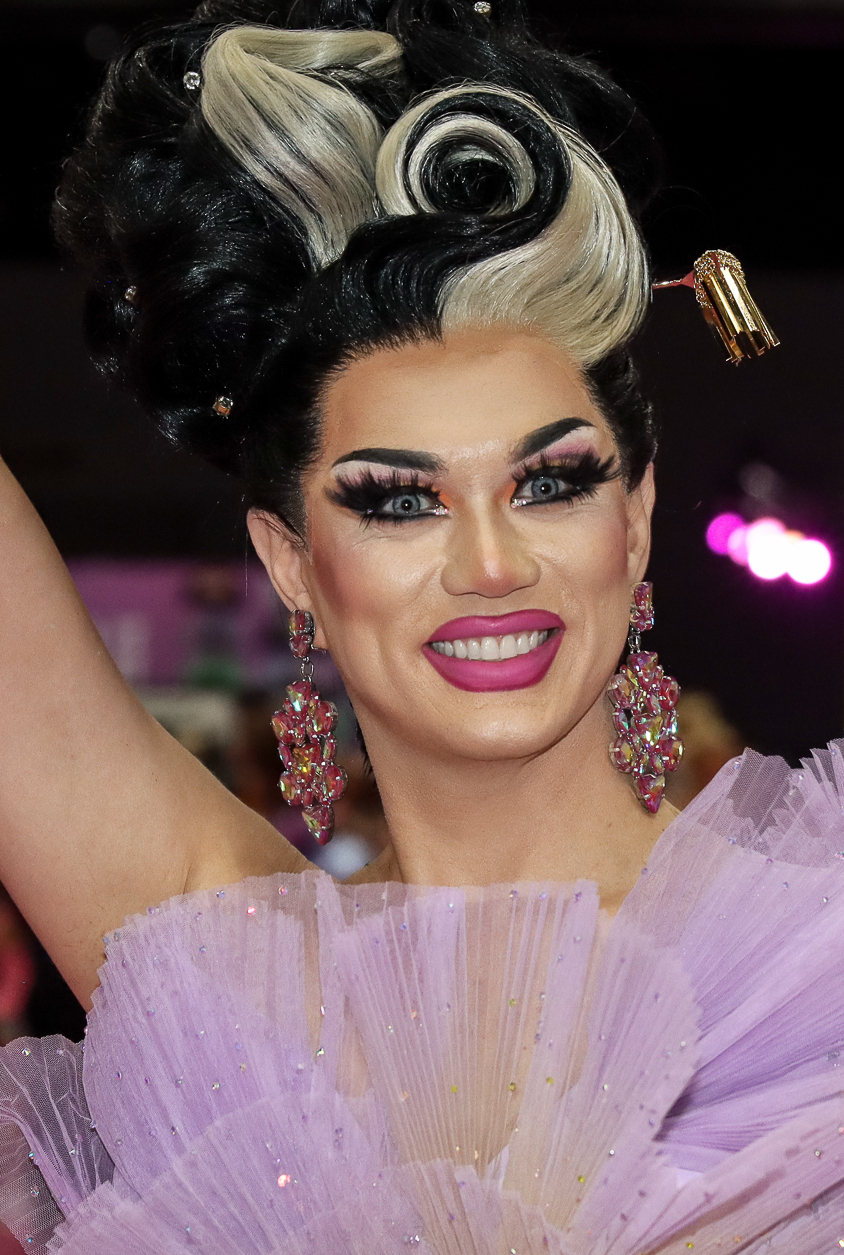
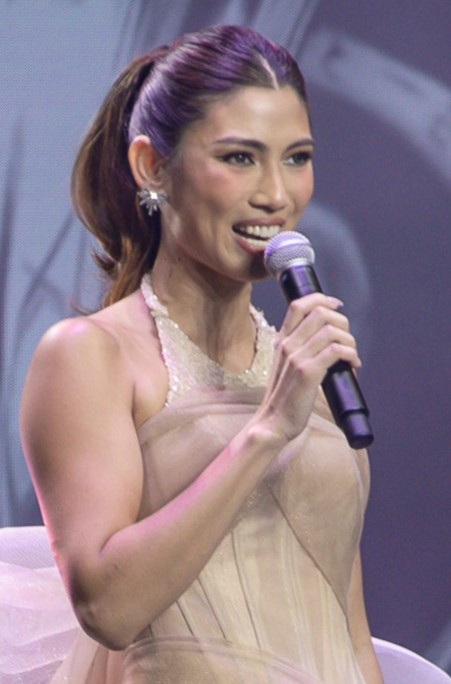
Judges Manila Luzon (left) and Nicole Cordoves (right)

The judging panel cast opinions about the challenge performances and theme-wear looks made from contestants. Dubbed as the Drag Lord, Manila Luzon has been the host and head since the series' premiere. Beauty pageant Nicole Cordoves appears supporting the host on the panel every episode, with comedienne Sassa Gurl appearing as a messenger and mentoring the competitors. A fourth slot is filled by one or more guest celebrity judges.

Drag Agents were later introduced in season two, where contestants from previous seasons come back as judges. For the fourth episode of the second season, Nicole Cordoves was absent from the panel with actress Megan Young acting as an "honoree" judge.

Judges on Drag Den
Judge	Season	
Judge	1	2
Manila Luzon	Main	Main
Nicole Cordoves	Main	Main
Sassa Gurl	Main	Main

== Release ==
Drag Den debuted through Amazon Prime Video on 8 December 2022, consisting of eight episodes until 26 January 2023. The second season premiered on 18 January 2024 for eight episodes and concluded on 7 March 2024.

== Reception ==
Ysmael Suarez from CNN Philippines sees the series focusing the growth of the contestants "before and during the competition" with no competitor being filmed "in a bad light, each having their clear strengths and defined perspective" for their drag persona. Writing for Nylon Manila, Rafael Bautista compliments the series for highlighting the Philippines' diverse local drag scene and how it goes "beyond location and gender."

== Accolades ==
Name of the award ceremony, year presented, category, nominee(s) of the award, and the result of the nomination
Award	Year (Note: Indicates the year of ceremony. Each year is linked to the article about the awards held that year, wherever possible.)	Category	Recipient(s) and nominee(s)	Result	Ref.
Asian Academy Creative Awards	2023	Best Entertainment Host	Manila Luzon	Won	
Asian Academy Creative Awards	2023	Best Non Scripted Entertainment	Drag Den	Nominated	
Asian Television Awards	2023	Best Entertainment Presenter or Host	Manila Luzon	Won	
Asian Television Awards	2023	Best Reality Show Entertainment	Drag Den	Nominated	
Asian Television Awards	2024	Best Reality Show Entertainment	Drag Den	Pending	

== Discography ==
List of singles
Title	Season
"May Kapa"	1
"Sustah"	2

== See also ==
- LGBTQ culture in the Philippines
- List of Amazon Prime Video original programming
- List of reality television programs with LGBT cast members
