= 100 Days Miracle =

2023 South Korean documentary series

- Hangul: 100일의 기적
- RR: 100irui gijeok
- MR: 100irŭi kijŏk
- Genre: Reality; Documentary
- Starring: Hori7on
- Narrated by: See list
- Country of origin: South Korea
- Original language: Korean; English
- No. of episodes: 10

Production
- Production company: MLD Entertainment

Original release
- Network: Mnet
- Release: July 7 – September 8, 2023

Related
- Dream Maker

100 Days Miracle (Korean: 100일의 기적; RR: 100irui gijeok) is a South Korean television documentary series starring the South Korea-based Filipino boy band Hori7on. The series premiered on July 7, 2023, on Mnet, and on its YouTube channel M2.

The series features the group's activities in the run-up to the release of their debut album from their arrival to South Korea from the Philippines.

== Cast ==
=== Main ===
==== Hori7on ====
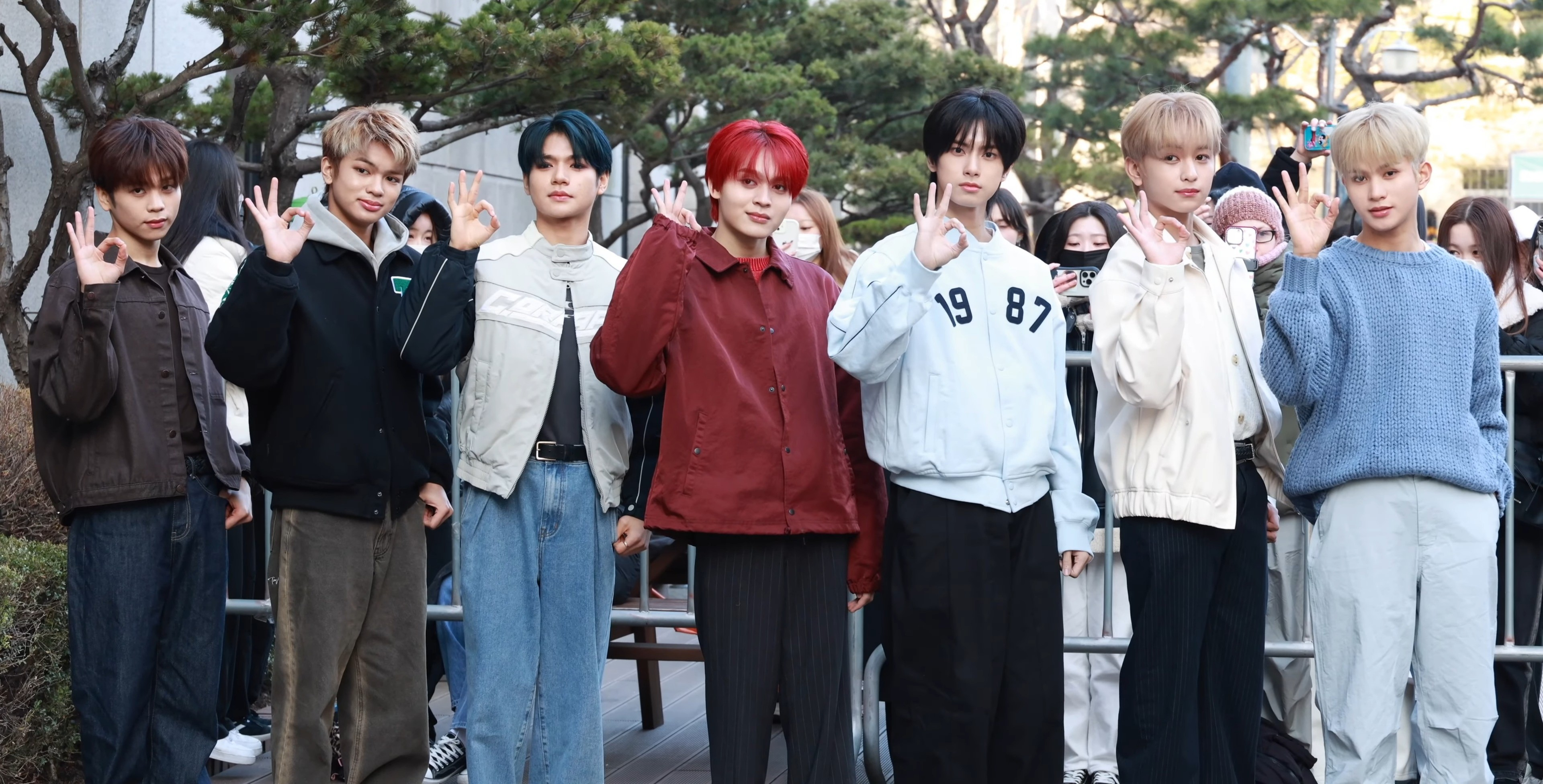
South Korea-based Filipino boy band Hori7on at a taping of Music Bank in 2024.

- Vinci Malizon
- Kim Ng
- Kyler Chua
- Reyster Yton
- Winston Pineda
- Jeromy Batac
- Marcus Cabais

==== Emcees ====
- Chanty (Episode 1–4; 7–8)
- Lee Dae-hwi (Episode 1–2)
- Kim Dong-han and Kim Yo-han of WEi (Episode 3–4)
- Noa, Gunwoo, and Leo of TFN (Episode 5–6)
- Haeun of Lapillus and Kio of TFN (Episode 7–8)

=== Other cast ===
- Bae Wan-hee

A choreographer for MLD Entertainment, Bae made a special appearance in Episode 1, giving Hori7on a tour around the label's headquarters. In Episode 5, Bae introduced the choreography for "Six7een".

- Bull$eye

A frequent collaborator of Hori7on, Bull$eye introduced the members to the label's recording studio on Episode 2. On Episode 5, Bull$eye introduced "Six7een" to the members.

==== Special appearances ====
- Lapillus

All six members of Lapillus made a special appearance on Episode 2.

- Sandara Park

Park made a special appearance on Episode 5 on the show following a taping of her performance in M Countdown.

== Episodes ==
No.	Title	Emcee(s)	Original release date
1	"Beginning of miracle" Transliteration: "Gijeogui sijak" (Korean: 기적의 시작)	Chanty and Daehwi	July 7, 2023
The members of Hori7on, with the exception of Reyster, depart for South Korea. Upon arrival, the members head straight to their dorms. Reyster eventually reunites with the group. Choreographer Ban Wan-Hee gave the group a tour around the headquarters of MLD Entertainment.
2	"Welcome to K-POP World"; Transliteration: "Welkeom tu K-POP Woldeu" (Korean: 웰컴 투 K-POP월드)	Chanty and Daehwi	July 14, 2023
Hori7on meets Lapillus at their practice room, after which they share a meal and converse. Then, Hori7on meets with Bull$eye in the studio where he shares that Winston showed the most improvement among the members. Hori7on then heads to the dance practice room where Jeromy was announced as the group's performance leader. The group then trains in preparation for the shooting of their music video for "Lovey Dovey". The group later arrives at the set for the music video and starts taping.
3	"Yo! Welcome to Korea!"; Transliteration: "Eoseo Wa Hangugeun Cheoeumiji?" (Korean: 어서 와 한국은 처음이지?)	Chanty, Donghan, and Yohan	July 21, 2023
The music video for "Lovey Dovey" was filmed throughout different sets. After the group completed their taping, Hori7on attended their Korean language classes at Soongsil University, where they were taught conversational Korean relating to money. Following their classes, Hori7on went to a hanbok rental before heading to Unhyeongung.
4	"Hori7on experiences the Joseon to MZ generation!" Transliteration: "Horaijeuni Gyeongheomhaneun Joseonsidaebuteo MZ kkaji!" (Korean: 호라이즌이 경험하는 조선시대부터 MZ까지!)	Chanty, Donghan, and Yohan	July 28, 2023
At Unhyeongung, Hori7on meets with Uhm Kye-sup, their teacher for the day. The members first take a lesson, and then a quiz, on Korean etiquette. The group was then divided into two to in a three-part competition for pocket money. The hyungnim team consisted of Vinci, Kim, and Kyler, as the group's older members, and the dongseng team consisted of Reyster, Winston, Jeromy, and Marcus, as the group's younger members. The dongseng team won the first two challenges, where they played Jaegi chagi and Bojagi chagi, but the hyungnim team ultimately won a larger share of the pocket money by winning the third part, where they played Tuho. The group then went shopping at Hongdae. The hyungnim team opted to play with claw machines while the dongseng team opted to buy street food.
5	"We are SIX7EEN"	Noa, Gunwoo, and Leo	August 4, 2023
At Hongdae, the hyungnim group fails to bargain with a storekeeper before going to a café. The dongseng team shares the food they bought before watching buskers perform. The group then went to a taping of M Countdown, where they watched the performance of Sandara Park. The group also met with Park following her performance. Bull$eye then calls the group to introduce their album's title track, "Six7een", before beginning to record the track. The group then rehearses the choreography for the song. In a rehearsal led by Jeromy, Kyler is frequently critiqued, both by Jeromy and Vinci. The two then leave the practice room, leaving Kyler distressed.
6	"Happy HORI7ON Day!"	Noa, Gunwoo, and Leo	August 11, 2023
7	"The miracle day"	Chanty, Haeun, and Kio	August 18, 2023
8	"Wonderful Birthday"	Chanty, Haeun, and Kio	August 25, 2023
9	"Make Korean Anchors"	TBA	September 1, 2023
10	"The Miracle Must Go On"	TBA	September 10, 2023

== Production ==
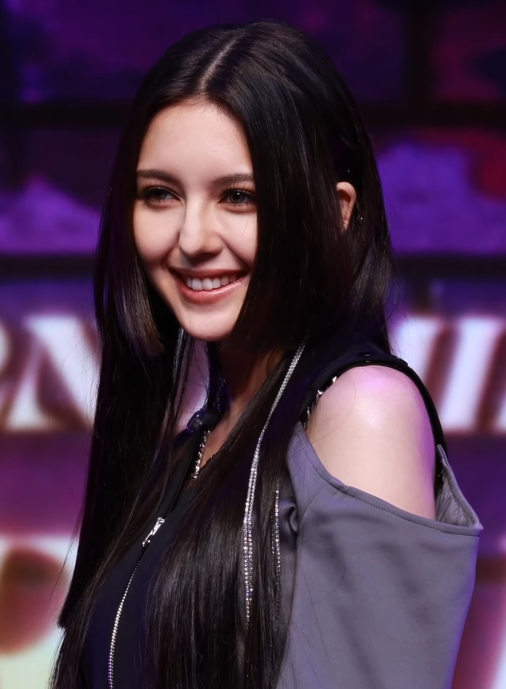
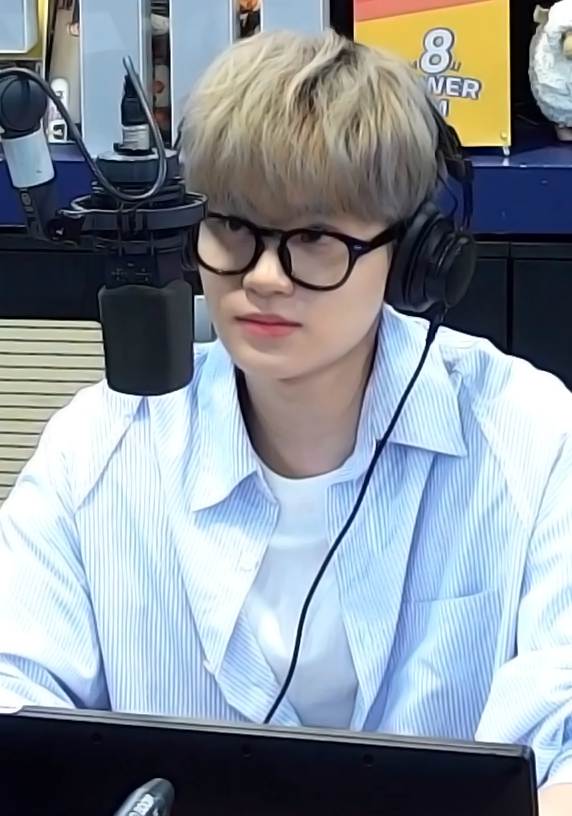
Chanty and Lee Dae-hwi served as the show's emcees.

Hori7on was formed through the Kapamilya Channel survival reality show Dream Maker, which aired from November 19, 2022, to February 12, 2022. The group comprises Vinci Malizon, Kim Ng, Kyler Chua, Reyster Yton, Winston Pineda, Jeromy Batac, and Marcus Cabais. Plans of a reality show starring the boy band, filmed prior to their debut, was first revealed in a press conference following the finale of Dream Maker, on February 14, 2023. MLD Entertainment CEO Lee Hyung-jin stated that they intend to create the reality show while the group was in "the stages of preparing for their album".

Lee later revealed in an interview with the entertainment website Kpopmap that the program will air on Mnet and its YouTube channel, M2, in July 2023. In a press release, MLD Entertainment announced that the program will premiere on July 7, 2023. A teaser trailer for the series' pilot episode was released on July 5, 2023.

Chanty of Lapillus and Lee Dae-hwi of AB6IX appear as special emcees from the first episode. Lee was absent for the third episode, where Kim Dong-han and Kim Yo-han of WEi served as emcees until the fourth episode. Later om from the fifth and sixth episode, Noa, Gunwoo, and Leo of TFN served as emcees. However, Haeun of Lapillus and Kio of TFN both served as emcees with Chanty from the seventh to the eighth episode.

=== Broadcast ===
The series is aired every Friday on Mnet, and its YouTube channel M2. On August 4, 2023, the series began airing on Philippine pay TV channel Myx, and streaming on the over-the-top content platform IWantTFC.
