= Friend-Ship =

- Digital cover

Studio album by Hori7on
- Released: July 24, 2023
- Genres: K-pop; P-pop
- Length: 64:24
- Languages: English; Filipino; Korean
- Label: MLD
- Producer: Lee Hyung-jin

Hori7on chronology
Friend-Ship (2023)	Daytour (2024)

Singles from Friend-Ship
- 1. "Six7een" Released: July 24, 2023; 2. "Birthday" Released: August 25, 2023

Friend-Ship is the debut studio album by the South Korea-based Filipino boy band Hori7on. The album was released by MLD Entertainment on July 24, 2023. The album is supported by the lead single "Six7een".

Friend-Ship contains 21 tracks and features songs sung in English, Filipino, and Korean, as well as collaborations with TFN, Lapillus, and New:Id. The album also reprises six tracks performed on Dream Maker, including the group's pre-debut singles "Dash", "Lovey Dovey", and "Salamat".

Commercially, Friend-Ship debuted at number 24 on the Circle Album Chart and peaked at number 7.

== Background ==
Hori7on was formed by ABS-CBN and MLD Entertainment through the Kapamilya Channel survival reality show Dream Maker, which aired from November 2022 to February 2023. In a press conference for the show's finale, MLD Entertainment CEO Lee Hyung-jin announced that the group would make their debut in South Korea in June 2023, however, ABS-CBN would later report that the group will debut in July.

In an interview published in The Manila Times, Vinci Malizon shared that the group is in the process of creating their style. Later, on a press conference for their first fan meeting, on May 4, 2023, Malizon shared that they intend to "incorporate different flavors" in their music to match the contemporary trends in K-pop, taking inspiration from South Korean groups Fifty Fifty and Ive. Marcus Cabais also suggested the inclusion of Filipino lyrics in their music to emphasize their Filipino identity.

Hori7on departed for South Korea on April 30. The group's preparations for the album is documented in the docuseries 100 Days Miracle, which premiered on July 7. All seven members were reported to be preparing for their debut in the country on May 10. Later on, Lee went on an interview with the entertainment website Kpopmap on June 27, in which he revealed that the group would debut with a full-length album in July 2023.

== Music and lyrics ==
Friend-Ship consists of 21 tracks. On the album's announcement, Sports Chosun reported that the album's themes center around "the dreams, hopes, and friendship", of the seven members and their fans. Leader Vinci described the album as having "endless styles", adding that the album is "dynamic". He added that the album shows "the different sides" that the group can offer, adding that the younger members showcase the "brighter side", while the older members showcase the "darker and sexier concepts". Jelou Galang of Inquirer, described the album's tracks as having a "welcoming atmosphere".

The members of Hori7on served as writers to "Mama", the fourth track. The album features collaborations from Haeun of Lapillus and Noa of TFN, the latter serving as a producer on the album's opening track, "Meteor". Tracks 7 to 13 features collaborations from the individual members of the pre-debut group New:Id, which consists of former contestants from Dream Maker.

=== Songs ===
The opening track of the album, "Meteor", is a hip-hop song. The second track, "Six7een", is the lead single and has been described as having an "addictive melody". "Birthday", the third track, is a "confession song" characterized by a "funky tune. The fourth track, "Mama", reconstructs the members' letters to their mothers, expressing their genuine affection for them. The fifth track, "How You Feel", was sung in Korean by Jeromy and Marcus, the group's youngest member alongside Haeun, the youngest member of Lapillus. The sixth track, "Death or Paradise" was performed by Vinci, Kim, Kyler, Reyster, and Winston, and features a sharp and passionate shuffle rhythm.

Tracks 7 to 13 are duet songs between a member of Hori7on and a guest singer, most of which are from New:Id. "Bonnie & Clyde" is a duet between Jeromy and Leo of TFN. "Light Way" is a tropical-themed duet between Marcus and Noa. "틈" ("Teum"; "Gap"), is a duet between Winston and Jom, with influences of hip-hop, R&B, and pop. "Like a Fiction" is a duet between Kim and Macky characterized by a sweet melody. "Ready to Burn" is a pop duet between Vinci and Thad, characterized through the sounds of a synthesizer. "Silhouette" is a duet between Kyler and Wilson characterized by guitar and bass sounds. "Cost", the final duet track, is a hip-hop duet between Reyster and Josh L.

Tracks 14 to 20 are original songs previously performed on Dream Maker. The first of the six tracks, "Take My Hand", served as the series' signal song. Tracks 15 to 17, "Tiger", "Hit Me", and "Odd Eye", were previously performed as part of a "mission" to launch an original K-pop song. The latter three tracks—"Dash", "Lovey Dovey", and "Salamat"—were previously released as promotional singles prior to the group's debut.

== Release and promotion ==
=== Marketing ===
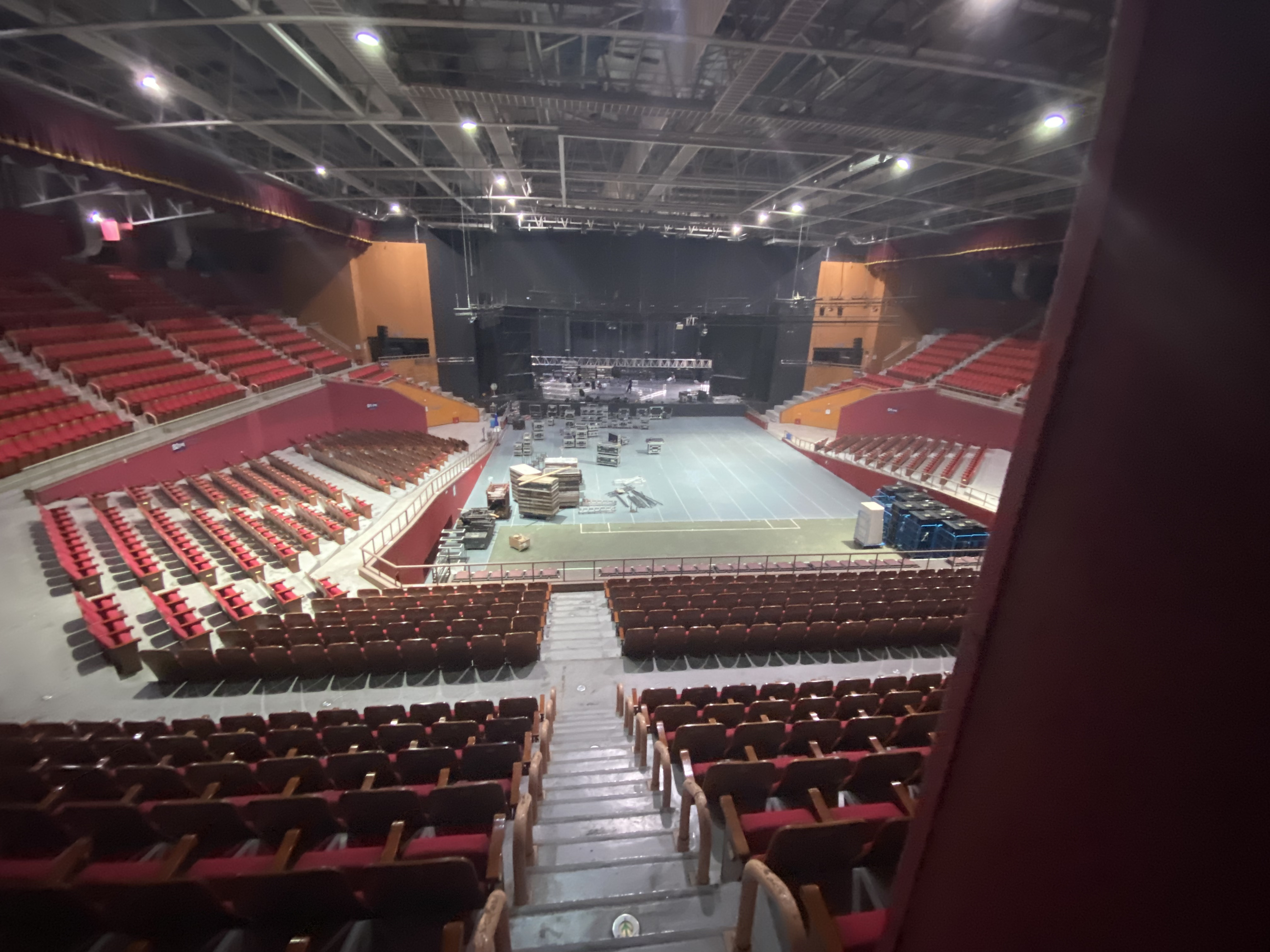
The Olympic Hall was the group's venue for their consecutive media and fan conferences.

On July 4, 2023, MLD Entertainment, through the group's social media accounts, announced the group's debut studio album, titled Friend-Ship, and released a teaser image. In a press release, MLD Entertainment announced that the group is soon to start domestic promotions within South Korea. The promotion scheduler for the album was released on July 5, via the group's social media accounts. Batches of concept images for the album were released online on July 7, and on July 11. A teaser trailer for the album was released online on July 13, while a teaser trailer for the lead single, "Six7een", was released the next day. A "highlight medley" featuring snippets from tracks 1 to 13 was released online on July 20. On August 25, "Birthday" was released as the second single from the album.

The album was released on July 24. The release of the album was accompanied by a media showcase, as well as a fan showcase held consecutively on the day of the album's release, at the Olympic Hall at the Seoul Olympic Park.

=== Title and artwork ===
The title, Friend-Ship (stylized as Friend-SHIP), alludes to the friendship of the group and its fandom, whose members are known as Anchors. The first concept photos for the album show the members in vivid backgrounds, donning a "youthful look". Another batch of concept photos show the members in sets with holographic objects, creating a "mysterious and dreamy atmosphere".

=== Live performances ===
In the weeks following the album's release, Hori7on went on several music shows to promote the album, including Mnet's M Countdown, KBS2's Music Bank, Arirang TV's Simply K-Pop, MBC TV's Show! Music Core, SBS's Inkigayo, and SBS MTV's The Show. On August 2, MLD Entertainment announced that the group will stage their first concert on in support of the album. The one-off concert, titled Voyage to Manila, was held at the Smart Araneta Coliseum on September 9.

== Commercial performance ==
According to the Hanteo Chart, Friend-Ship sold 2,945 copies from the week of its release. The album debuted at number 24 on the Circle Album Chart for the issue dated July 23 – 9, 2023, with 7,158 sales.

== Track listing ==
Friend-Ship track listing
No.	Title	Lyrics	Music	Length
1.	"Meteor" (produced by Noa of TFN)	Noa; Ondine (Avec); MonkeyVegas (Avec); Meang Co	Noa; Ondine (Avec); MonkeyVegas (Avec); Meang Co	3:05
2.	"Six7een"	Vermillion Frame (Avec); Meang Co	Vermillion Frame (Avec); Chamaru; Akac; Seongbae; Meang Co	3:11
3.	"Birthday"	Bull$eye (Avec); How; Ley (Avec); Arcon; Meang Co	Bull$eye (Avec); Arcon; Ley (Avec); Meang Co	3:11
4.	"Mama"	Jeromy Batac; Vinci Malizon; Kim Ng; Kyler Chua; Reyster Yton; Winston Pineda; Marcus Cabais; Bull$eye (Avec); Kikhily; Meang Co	Bull$eye (Avec); Xxio (Avec); Meang Co	3:39
5.	"How You Feel" (featuring Haeun of Lapillus)	Bull$eye (Avec); MonkeyVegas (Avec); DoDoL; Meang Co	Bull$eye (Avec); MonkeyVegas (Avec); DoDoL; Meang Co	3:18
6.	"Death or Paradise"	Ondine (Avec); Ley (Avec); Boran; Heuyeon (Avec); Bull$eye (Avec); Meang Co	Madewell (Avec); Ondine (Avec); Ley (Avec); Boran; Heuyeon (Avec); Bull$eye (Avec); Meang Co	3:06
7.	"Bonnie & Clyde" (featuring Leo of TFN)	Bull$eye (Avec); Aaron H.; Kikhily; Meang Co	Bull$eye (Avec); Aaron H.; Meang Co	2:28
8.	"Light Way" (featuring Noa of TFN)	Bull$eye (Avec); Ondine (Avec); Real-fantasy; Kikhily; Meang Co	Bull$eye (Avec); Real-fantasy	2:34
9.	"틈" (featuring Jom of New:ID) (Teum)	Bull$eye (Avec); Ondine (Avec); Kikhily; Meang Co	Bull$eye (Avec); Lee Min-young (1by1); D.stus (1by1); Ondine (Avec); Meang Co	2:23
10.	"Like a Fiction" (featuring Macky of New:ID)	Yoon Hee-won; Kikhily; Meang Co	MonkeyVegas (Avec); Yoon; Geulin (Avec); Meang Co	2:39
11.	"Ready to Burn" (featuring Thad of New:ID)	Heuyeon (Avec); Madewell (Avec); Meang Co	Madewell (Avec); Heuyeon (Avec); Meang Co	2:35
12.	"Silhouette" (featuring Wilson of New:ID)	Vermillion Frame (Avec); Meang Co	Vermillion Frame (Avec); Jamaru; Meang Co	2:44
13.	"Cost" (featuring Josh L. of New:ID)	Bull$eye (Avec); Kit; De view; Kikhily; Meang Co	Bull$eye (Avec); De view; Meang Co	2:23
14.	"Take My Hand"	Timobillion; Meang Co	Bull$eye (Avec); Real-fantasy; Greenism (Avec); Meang Co	3:45
15.	"Tiger"	Bull$eye (Avec); Kit; INFX; Meang Co	Bull$eye (Avec); Kit; INFX; Meang Co	2:57
16.	"Hit Me"	Bull$eye (Avec); Arcon; How; Meang Co	Bull$eye (Avec); Arcon; Meang Co	3:17
17.	"Odd Eye"	Bull$eye (Avec); Ondine (Avec); D.M.; Monkey Vegas (Avec); How; Meang Co	Bull$eye (Avec); D.M.; Ondine (Avec); Monkey Vegas (Avec); Meang Co	2:59
18.	"Dash"	Bull$eye (Avec); Ondine (Avec); MonkeyVegas (Avec); How; Meang Co	Bull$eye (Avec); MonkeyVegas (Avec); Ondine (Avec); How; Meang Co	3:09
19.	"Lovey Dovey"	Bull$eye (Avec); How; Yuka (Avec); Meang Co	Bull$eye (Avec); Yuka (Avec); How; Meang Co	3:09
20.	"Salamat"	Bull$eye (Avec); Ondine (Avec); Jeonsol (Avec); Kikhily; Meang Co	Bull$eye (Avec); Ondine (Avec); Jeonsol (Avec)	3:36
21.	"Sixteen (Inst.)"		Vermillion Frame (Avec); Chamaru; Akac; Seongbae; Meang Co	3:11
Total length:				64:24

Notes

- The album's CD contains seven exclusive tracks between "Death or Paradise" and "Take My Hand". In digital releases, tracks 14–21 are noted as 7–12.

== Charts ==
=== Weekly charts ===
Weekly chart performance for Friend-Ship
Chart (2023)	Peak position
South Korean Albums (Circle)	7

=== Monthly charts ===
Monthly chart performance for Friend-Ship
Chart (2023)	Position
South Korean Albums (Circle)	69

== Release history ==
Release dates and formats for Friend-Ship
Region	Date	Format	Version	Label	Ref.
Various	July 24, 2023	CD; digital download; streaming	A; B; C	MLD	
