= Dream Maker (TV program) =

Filipino-South Korean reality talent competition

- Title card
- Also known as: Dream Maker: Search for the Next Global Pop Group
- Genre: Reality show
- Written by: Alvin Quizon; Jeong Na-young
- Directed by: Jon Moll; Lee Eung-gu
- Presented by: Kim Chiu; Ryan Bang
- Opening theme: "Take My Hand" by Dream Maker contestants
- Country of origin: Philippines
- Original languages: Filipino; Korean
- No. of episodes: 26

Production
- Executive producers: Carlo L. Katigbak; Cory V. Vidanes; Laurenti M. Dyogi; Luis Andrada; Timothy Kim; Lee Hyoung-jin
- Producers: Reily Santiago; Marcus Joseph Vinuya; Gabriel Nino Amaro; Patch Manela Bungubung; Lee Eung-gu
- Production locations: ABS-CBN Broadcasting Center, Quezon City, Philippines; Caloocan Sports Complex, Caloocan, Philippines (finale)
- Running time: 60 minutes (Episodes 1–25); 120 minutes (Episode 26)
- Production companies: ABS-CBN Entertainment; MLD Entertainment; KAMP Global

Original release
- Network: Kapamilya Channel (Note: The show was also aired on Kapamilya Online Live, A2Z, and worldwide via TFC. It is also available on-demand via iWantTFC. PIE Channel and TV5 was aired alongside for the finale.)
- Release: November 19, 2022 – February 12, 2023

Related
- Be The Next: 9 Dreamers

Dream Maker (Korean: 드림메이커), also known as Dream Maker: The Search for the Next Global Pop Group, is a Philippine-South Korean boy group survival reality show. The show premiered on A2Z and Kapamilya Channel on November 19, 2022.

Hosted by Kim Chiu and Ryan Bang, the show featured 62 contestants (known as Dream Chasers) compete to be part of a seven-piece boy band that will be trained and debut in South Korea as a global P-pop group. The show employed a panel of mentors from both the Philippines and South Korea who train and critique the contestants.

The show concluded on February 12, 2023, where Jeromy Batac, Marcus Cabais, Kyler Chua, Vinci Malizon, Reyster Yton, Kim Ng and Winston Pineda formed the group Hori7on.

Dream Maker is the second reality show produced by ABS-CBN to spawn a boy band, following Pinoy Boyband Superstar in 2016, which formed BoyBandPH.

== Overview ==
=== Premise ===
The format is similar to the South Korean survival show franchise Produce 101, where hopefuls will undergo rigorous training to debut as professional talents and performers. 62 Dream Chasers will compete for the top 7 spots, who will be trained and debut in South Korea, and will be launched as a global P-pop group.

=== Development ===
On September 5, 2022, a press conference and contract signing between ABS-CBN, MLD Entertainment, and KAMP Global was held announcing a Filipino idol survival show with auditions happening around the country through Star Hunt. Auditions were open for males aged 13 to 22 who are talented in singing, dancing, or rapping. It was held in multiple Ayala Malls within the month. The head of Star Magic, Laurenti Dyogi earlier stated:

We're really serious about getting into the international arena. We're looking at all ways and means to get the Filipino artist, the Filipino talent to be recognized globally. We're very happy to have partners who recognize that Filipinos are very talented and that we can compete globally. This is one step. With our two new partners, it will be easier, faster, better for us to get to the global arena at the shortest possible time."

On November 4–6, 2022, the hosts and mentors were first announced on the national news program TV Patrol. A media conference was held three days later. On November 25, the official music video of Dream Maker theme song "Take My Hand" was released on music platforms. The contestants performed the theme song on the noontime variety shows It's Showtime and ASAP Natin 'To.

An interactive program Dream Maker Pause and Play aired on PIE Channel from January 9 to March 31, 2023, hosted by DJ Jhai Ho and former MNL48 members Sela Guia and Gabb Skribikin.

=== Broadcast ===
The program premiered on November 19, 2022 on A2Z and Kapamilya Channel. The show also streamed online on iWantTFC and Kapamilya Online Live, with international broadcast via MYX Global and TFC. PIE Channel and TV5 also aired the show for the finale episode.

== Cast ==
Main hosts

- Kim Chiu
- Ryan Bang

Korean Dream Mentors

- Bae Wan-hee
- Bae Yoon-jung
- Seo Won-jin
- Bull$eye
- Thunder
- JeA (guest mentor for the 1st Mentors' Evaluation)

Filipino Dream Mentors

- Angeline Quinto (absent during the K-pop Song Mission)
- Darren Espanto (absent during the Position Mission)
- Bailey May
- Maymay Entrata (guest mentor for the Position Mission)

Online hosts

- VJ Ai dela Cruz
- Sela Guia (guest host on November 27, 2022)
- Sheena Belarmino (guest host on November 27, 2022)

Special appearances

- Chanty (guest host for the finale episode)
- TFN
- Bini
- BGYO

== Contestants ==
The 62 contestants were first announced on the social media accounts of Dream Maker.

Color key

Final members of Hori7on
Contestants eliminated in the final episode
Contestants eliminated in the third elimination round
Contestants eliminated in the second elimination round
Contestants eliminated in the first elimination round
Contestants that left the show

62 contestants
Jeromy Batac	Marcus Cabais	Kyler Chua	Vinci Malizon	Reyster Yton
Kim Ng	Winston Pineda	Drei Amahan	Prince Encelan	Wilson Budoy
Thad Sune	Jay-R Albino	Matt Cruz	Macky Tuason	Jom Aceron
Josh Labing-isa	Russu Laurente	Denrich Ang	Neil Limbaga	Joshua Nubla
Jules Indiola	Asi Gatdula	Luiz Aguaviva	Josh Worsley	Pan-Pan Rosas
Anjo Sarnate	Ishiro Incapas	Ron Castillo	Mathew Cruz	KL Socobos
Lyle Jangad	Onie de Guzman	Jay Lagatao	DJ Villaver	Chie Tan
JM Ronquillo	Karl Villamar	Miguel Gonzalez	Kerwin Buenafe	Jeremy Austin
Lem Malubay	Kean Parale	Asa Wy	Julius Ledesma	Tony Migallon
Redd Arcega	John Regaña	Vieo Garcia	Steel Macabanti	Gabby Regodon
Renz Cabading	Omar Uddin	Laurence Matias	Wayne Gutierrez	JL Macatangay
Chris Pello	Tanner Evans	Toven Bella	Tatin Castillon	Kenzo Bautista
Julian Osorio	Justin Uy			

== Mechanics ==
=== Voting ===
Voting was set online through voting cycles at joinnow.ph or ktx.ph. Voting is free for joinnow.ph but limited to 100 votes per Dream Chaser per device in every voting cycle. Unlimited paid voting for ktx.ph is implemented. The first online voting cycle was held from November 19 to December 11, 2022, at 23:00 (PST). The second online voting cycle was held from December 25, 2022, to January 8, 2023, at 23:00 (PST). The third online voting cycle started from January 15 to 29, 2023 at 23:00 (PST). The final voting cycle started from February 5, at 23:00 (PST), and ended on February 12 after the final mission performances.

The voting system was changed in the third voting cycle. Votes from joinnow.ph was still implemented, with the same limit of votes, but ktx.ph votes were abolished in this cycle. Votes from dreammaker.ph was implemented in this voting cycle, with 10 votes per account per day. The same rules for the third voting cycle was used in the final voting cycle.

=== Missions ===
Dream Mentors' Evaluation (November 19–20, 26–27, 2022)

The Dream Chasers will perform individually in front of the Dream Mentors. After each performance, the Dream Mentors will comment and provide feedback on each performance and each Dream Mentor will give points to each of the Dream Chasers. The maximum points possible for a Dream Chaser to earn from each Dream Mentor is 100, for a maximum possible score of 900 points for each contestant. This point system will form the basis of their ranks. If the succeeding Dream Chaser gets a higher rank than the Dream Chaser sitting, he will be bumping off other Dream Chasers based on the order of rank.

Theme Song Mentors' Evaluation (December 3, 2022)

The Dream Chasers must memorize the show's theme song, Take My Hand, and the choreography. The Top 7 Dream Chasers are not guaranteed a center position. On their final assessment, mentors Bae Wan-hee and Angeline Quinto will rank the Dream Chasers by giving each of them letter grades A, B and C. Only 15 Dream Chasers will be on Level A, 20 on Level B, while the rest will be on Level C.

Mission 1 – Group Battle (December 4, 10–11, 2022)

The Dream Chasers are divided into ten groups. Unlike Produce 101, the Dream Mentors chose 10 Dream Chasers whom they think had leader material. The Dream Mentors chose Wilson Budoy, Vinci Malizon, Jeromy Batac, Drei Amahan, Tatin Castillon, Reyster Yton, KL Socobos, Laurence Matias, Matt Cruz, and Russu Laurente to be the leaders of their respective teams. The leaders will be able to choose their members. Higher-rank members will have priority to choose their members first. After the division, the leaders were divided into two groups (the top five higher-ranking Dream Chaser leaders in one group, while the remaining five in the other group).

Five songs were revealed for the leaders to choose from: Backstreet Boys' "All I Have To Give", NSYNC's "Tearin' Up My Heart", VST & Company's "Awitin Mo, Sasayaw Ko", Bini's "Da Coconut Nut", and BGYO's "He's Into Her". Same with the member selection, higher-ranking leaders will have the priority to choose their song first; however, if more than one chose the same song, there will be a challenge that will be done by the leaders and the one who will accomplish the challenge will get the song they initially chose. Those who lost the challenge will select another song (higher-ranking leaders will have the priority to choose first). Once all the leaders choose their song, they will know their opponent from the other group.

Each Dream Chaser will be evaluated individually by the Dream Mentors. They can earn a maximum possible score of 800 points from the Dream Mentors (100 points each from the 8 Dream Mentors). The scores of the team members will be added up to determine their team score, and the team who got the highest total points will be the winning group. Each of the members of the winning group will receive 100 points as a bonus for their individual points to be used in the first elimination.

After all the match-up finished, the host Kim Chiu announced that there would only be 44 Dream Chasers left after the first elimination.

Mission 2 – Position Mission (December 31, 2022, January 1, 7–8, 2023)

There will be 8 songs available in this mission: 3 songs for vocals (Zack Tabudlo's "Habang Buhay", Charlie Puth ft. Jungkook's "Left and Right", and Flip Music All Star's "Tuloy Pa Rin"), 3 songs for dance (G22's "Bang", TFN's "Amazon", and Astro's "Alive"), and 2 songs for rap (Francis Magalona's "Kabataan Para sa Kinabukasan" and Juan Caoile ft. Kyleswish's "Marikit"). The vocal groups can have only 5 members, the dance groups will have 7 members, and the rap groups will only have 4 members each.

To gain an advantage, ten Dream Chasers are chosen via a fishbowl to play an arcade version of basketball. The top 3 Dream Chasers who got the highest points in the arcade will earn an advantage: the priority of choosing the song first and securing their spot on their positions. After that, one by one, the Dream Chasers secretly voted for the song they want to perform. Once a song exceed its limit of Dream Chasers per group, the lower-ranked members will be bumped-off and will need to choose another song.

Even though the Dream Chasers are grouped by their songs, they are being evaluated by the mentors individually. The Dream chasers can earn a maximum of 700 points from the Dream Mentors (100 points each from the 7 Dream Mentors). Whoever will be ranked first on each groups will earn a 50-point benefit, which will be added from the Dream Mentors' score. Only three Dream Chasers will earn the Best Vocals, Best Dancer, and Best Rapper (the highest-scoring Dream Chaser from each position). Each of these winners will receive an additional 50 points as a bonus for their individual points to be used in the second elimination.

Mission 3 – New K-pop Song Launch Mission (January 21–22, 28–29, 2023)

20 days before the second elimination, Dream Mentor Angeline Quinto revealed the next mission to the remaining 44 Dream Chasers. There will be four songs in this mission: "Odd Eye", "Hit Me", "Lovey Dovey", and "Tiger", all of which were composed by Dream Mentor Bull$eye. Unlike the Produce 101 series, instead of the public choosing the songs appropriate to each of the Dream Chasers, the Dream Chasers themselves will choose the song they want to perform. The order of choosing is based on their second ranking.

One by one, starting from rank 1, the Dream Chasers will enter a room with 4 doors concealed behind a black curtain, with the songs written on each door. They need to enter the door of the song they want to perform. Each door can hold a maximum of 11 members. Once the quota is reached, the door will be locked, and they need to select another song. The Dream Chasers cannot see the selected songs of the Dream Chasers who entered the room first.

However, like with the Produce 101 series, not all Dream Chasers will perform in Mission 3, only those who survived the second elimination will get to perform the song. Unlike the original series, however, there will be no rearrangement of the teams, and whoever survived in the last eliminations will be the final group.

Like the first two missions, each Dream Chaser will be evaluated individually, and they can earn a maximum possible score of 600 points (100 points each from the 6 Dream Mentors). Since there are different members in each of the songs, their individual scores will be averaged to get their group score.

There will be two winning teams in this mission, and these winning teams will have an additional benefit. The team who got the second-highest group score will get to perform their song in one Kapamilya show (It's Showtime), while the team who got the highest group score will get to perform their song in two Kapamilya shows (It's Showtime and Magandang Buhay).

Aside from the benefit to perform in Kapamilya shows, the Dream Chaser who got the most votes from the voting booth in the third mall show in Robinsons Las Piñas will get an additional benefit of 30 points, to be used in the third elimination. It was announced in the mall show that Ishiro Incapas will receive the 30-point benefit, garnering 23.22% of the votes, beating Vinci Malizon and Wilson Budoy.

Mission 4 – Final Mission (February 11–12, 2023)

There will be two original songs in this mission, composed by Dream Mentors Bull$eye ("Dash") and Seo Won-jin ("Deja Vu"). The Dream Chasers are given the chance to pick the song they want to perform. The order of choosing is based on the third elimination ranking. After picking, the groups need to be balanced at 8 members each, and the group with the most members will need to vote secretly via the voting booth and the most voted Dream Chaser(s) will need to pick from another team.

In another twist, the order of the performance is determined by picking a paper in the bowl. Whoever gets the red paper will decide who will perform first. Matt Cruz gets the red paper, and his group decided to perform last.

For the first time, mentors have no bearing in the rank of the Dream Chasers, as the public will select the Top 7 Dream Chasers.

=== Elimination Mechanics ===
First elimination (December 24–25, 2022)

For the first elimination, the Dream Mentors, as well as the public, will comprise each Dream Chasers' points and rank.

The scores received by each Dream Chaser from each Dream Mentor during the group battle will be added up, as well as the 100-point benefit for each member of the winning teams will comprise the Dream Mentors' Points. The votes of the people will comprise the Public Points. The highest-voted Dream Chaser will receive 800 points; each rank has a 10-point difference (2nd-voted artist will receive 790, 3rd will receive 780, and so on, until the last place will only get 230 points). The Dream Mentors' points and the Public Points earned by each Dream Chaser will be combined and this will be the basis of their new ranks.

The maximum points that the Dream Chasers can earn is 1,700 points (100 points each from the Dream mentors for a total of 800 points, the 100-point benefit for those Dream Chasers who are member of the winning team, and lastly, 800 points from the public).

Top 44 Dream Chasers will advance to the next mission, while Dream Chasers ranked 45 onwards will be eliminated.

Second elimination (January 14–15, 2023)

The same elimination method will be used in this elimination round, except that the highest-voted Dream Chaser will only receive 700 points (as opposed to 800 points in the first elimination).

The maximum points that the Dream Chasers can earn is 1,500 points (100 points each from the Dream mentors for a total of 700 points, the 100-point benefit for those Dream Chasers who got the Best Vocals, Best Dancer, and Best Rapper, and lastly, 700 points from the public).

Only 28 Dream Chasers will advance to the next mission, while the remaining Dream Chasers will be eliminated.

Third elimination (February 4–5, 2023)

Based on the teaser on Episode 22, only 14 Dream Chasers will advance to the next mission, while the remaining Dream Chasers will be eliminated. However, it was announced on the teaser for Episode 23 that it will be 16 Dream Chasers who will advance to the final.

The same elimination method will be used in this elimination round, except that the highest-voted Dream Chaser will only receive 600 points (as opposed to 700 points in the second elimination).

However, instead of Dream Chasers being grouped into two groups (Safe Zone and Danger Zone), they will be called one by one (in some circumstances, two or more people will be called) by host Kim Chiu via the large screen in the waiting room to come to the Dream Stage. They will not know the fate of the ones called before them until they enter the Dream stage.

Fourth elimination (February 12, 2023)

This elimination is different from the other voting cycles, as only the public votes will determine the Final Top 7.

=== Group name ===
The public is given the chance to cast their entries for the group name of the final 7 Dream Chasers by tweeting the name of the group, as well as the hashtag #MyDreamGroupName and tagging the official Twitter accounts. Entries for the group name started on January 21, 2023, and ended on February 3, 2023. The most creative names were shortlisted and were voted by the public via dreammaker.ph from February 6 to 11, at 23:00 (PST). The person with the winning entry would have the chance to watch the finale on February 12, 2023, receive Dream Maker freebies, as well as have the chance to meet the Final Top 7 Dream Chasers.

On Episode 24, the entries are shortlisted into 5 names (B2in, Pr7me, Hori7on, DM7, Bright7). In the finale, the group name was revealed to be Hori7on.

== Ranking ==
For the first ranking, only the Dream mentors determine the Dream Chasers' ranks, in which the first ranking was determined in episode 4. Starting from the first elimination, both the Dream mentors' scores and the public points determine the Dream Chasers' ranks. However, in the last elimination, only the public votes determine the final Dream Chasers' ranks.

Color key

New Top 7

#	Episode 4	Episode 12	Episode 18	Episode 24	Episode 26
1	Jay-R Albino	Jeromy Batac ▲4	Jeromy Batac	Vinci Malizon ▲1	Jeromy Batac ▲4
2	Wilson Budoy	Vinci Malizon ▲2	Vinci Malizon	Marcus Cabais ▲1	Marcus Cabais
3	Marcus Cabais	Drei Amahan ▲3	Marcus Cabais ▲4	Kyler Chua ▲6	Kyler Chua
4	Vinci Malizon	Asi Gatdula ▲4	Reyster Yton ▲4	Reyster Yton	Vinci Malizon ▼3
5	Jeromy Batac	Ishiro Incapas ▲39	Winston Pineda ▲18	Jeromy Batac ▼4	Reyster Yton ▼1
6	Drei Amahan	Wilson Budoy ▼4	Drei Amahan ▼3	Winston Pineda ▼1	Kim Ng ▲2
7	Tatin Castillon	Marcus Cabais ▼4	Wilson Budoy ▼1	Wilson Budoy	Winston Pineda ▼1

=== First voting cycle ===
#	Mentors' Evaluation (With Benefit)		Public Votes (Combined joinnow.ph & ktx.ph votes)		Total Points (Mentors' Points + Public Points)	
#	Dream Chaser	Mentors' Points	Dream Chaser	Public Points	Dream Chaser	Total Points
1	Wilson Budoy	794	Vinci Malizon	800	Jeromy Batac	1,478
2	Drei Amahan	740	Macky Tuason	790	Vinci Malizon	1,447
3	Jeromy Batac	738	Marcus Cabais	780	Drei Amahan	1,440
4	Chie Tan	732	Ishiro Incapas	770	Asi Gatdula	1,430
5	Russu Laurente	713	Reyster Yton	760	Ishiro Incapas	1,415
6	Thad Sune	703	Asi Gatdula	750	Wilson Budoy	1,404
7	Jom Aceron	699	Jeromy Batac	740	Marcus Cabais	1,372

Notes

- On episodes 6-8 (Group Battle), an additional 100 points on the mentors' points are given to the boys of the winning teams.
- Although Reyster got more public votes than Ishiro, the broadcast points are 760 and 770 points, respectively.
- The ranking for episode 12 is the result of combining mentors' points from the public points.

=== Second voting cycle ===
#	Mentors' Evaluation (With Benefit)		Public Votes (Combined joinnow.ph & ktx.ph votes)		Total Points (Mentors' Points + Public Points)	
#	Dream Chaser	Mentors' Points	Dream Chaser	Public Points	Dream Chaser	Total Points
1	Jeromy Batac	709	Marcus Cabais	700	Jeromy Batac	1,359
2	Drei Amahan	647	Reyster Yton	690	Vinci Malizon	1,262
3	Josh Labing-isa	646	Vinci Malizon	680	Marcus Cabais	1,245
4	Russu Laurente	643	Winston Pineda	670	Reyster Yton	1,243
5	Wilson Budoy	589	Joshua Nubla	660	Winston Pineda	1,181
6	Vinci Malizon	582	Jeromy Batac	650	Drei Amahan	1,177
7	Lyle Jangad	581	Macky Tuason	640	Wilson Budoy	1,149

Notes

- On episodes 13-16 (Position Mission), an additional 50 points on the mentors' points are given to the Dream Chasers who got 1st in their respective groups. An additional 50 points will be given to the Dream Chasers who got 1st in their respective positions.
- The highest-voting Dream Chaser will only get 700 points, instead of 800 in the first elimination.

=== Third voting cycle ===
#	Mentors' Evaluation		Public Votes (Combined joinnow.ph & dreammaker.ph votes)		Total Points (Mentors' Points + Public Points)	
#	Dream Chaser	Mentors' Points	Dream Chaser	Public Points	Dream Chaser	Total Points
1	Vinci Malizon	512	Marcus Cabais	600	Vinci Malizon	1,102
2	Kyler Chua	506	Vinci Malizon	590	Marcus Cabais	1,089
3	Jeromy Batac	501	Winston Pineda	580	Kyler Chua	1,076
4	Thad Sune	499	Kyler Chua	570	Reyster Yton	1,047
5	Marcus Cabais	489	Reyster Yton	560	Jeromy Batac	1,021
6	Reyster Yton	487	Jom Aceron	550	Winston Pineda	985
7	Wilson Budoy	480	Kim Ng	540	Wilson Budoy	960

Notes

- It was announced on Episode 19 that there will be two winning teams in this mission (New K-pop Song Launch Mission), with each of them having the chance to perform their mission song in one or two Kapamilya shows.
- It was announced on Episode 20 that only one will receive a 30-point benefit by having the most votes in the voting booth in the third mall show. In the mall show happened on January 21 (televised on Episode 22), it was announced that Ishiro Incapas will receive the benefit, beating Vinci Malizon and Wilson Budoy.
- The highest-voting Dream Chaser will only get 600 points, instead of 700 in the second elimination.

=== Final voting cycle ===
#	Public Votes (Combined joinnow.ph & dreammaker.ph votes)	
#	Dream Chaser	Public Votes
1	Jeromy Batac	3,188,238
2	Marcus Cabais	2,824,716
3	Kyler Chua	2,697,520
4	Vinci Malizon	2,447,877
5	Reyster Yton	2,285,407
6	Kim Ng	2,214,510
7	Winston Pineda	2,049,832

Notes

- Only the public votes will determine the final Top 7, as mentioned by host Kim Chiu on Episode 24.

== Episodes ==
No.	Title	Original release date
1	"#DreamMaker"	November 19, 2022
The first batch of Dream Chasers set foot at the stage for their first evaluation vying for a seat in the Top 7. The show ended when Marcus Cabais bumped-off Vinci Malizon in the rank 1 seat.
2	"#AjaDreamMaker"	November 20, 2022
16 Dream Chasers put their best performances forward as they try to amaze the Dream Mentors and replace the seven hopefuls occupying the top seats. The show ended with Marcus Cabais still seated on the rank 1 seat.
3	"#DreamMakerFighting"	November 26, 2022
Tension runs high as the third batch of Dream Chasers shows off their vocal prowess and knife-like dance moves to replace the seven Dream Chasers currently sitting at the top 7 seats. The show ended with Wilson Budoy bumped-off Marcus and sat on the rank 1 seat.
4	"#DreamMaker1stRanking"	November 27, 2022
The final batch of Dream Chasers performed on stage and completed the Top 7, with Jay-R Albino occupying the top spot. Host Kim Chiu then tells their next mission: memorizing the show's theme song. While the Dream Chasers are practicing for their theme song, the Korean Dream Mentors came via surprise visit and talked to the Dream Chasers. The Top 7 Dream Chasers were given Dream Badges.
5	"#DreamMakerTakeMyHand"	December 3, 2022
At the start of the show, the Dream Chasers started to move into their dormitories. Their roommates are based on their rank in the past Dream Mentors' Evaluation; higher-ranked Dream Chasers will have fewer roommates, lower-ranked Dream Chasers will have more roommates, while the Top 1 will have a room for himself. Soon, the Dream Chasers are practicing for the theme song. Dream Chasers were trained on their vocals and choreography. After practicing, the Dream Chasers were evaluated by Dream Mentors Angeline Quinto and Bae Wan-hee for their final assessment. After the performances, they soon decided the Dream Chasers' letter grades. The Dream Chasers are divided into Level A, B or C. Host Ryan Bang then announced to the Dream Chasers their letter grade. Near the end of the episode, Bae Wan-hee announced that Vinci Malizon was chosen to be the center of the theme song.
6	"#DreamMakerMissionOne"	December 4, 2022
After the performance of the theme song, Dream Chasers proceeded into their first mission: the Group Battle. Dream Chasers were split into 10 groups; 2 teams battle on the songs provided by them. The teams practice and then perform the songs, the mentors will give a score to each of the members, and with the members on the winning team for their song receiving a bonus of 100 points, which will be added to their individual votes. The rehearsals and performances of All I Have to Give teams were aired this episode.
7	"#DreamMakerMatchups"	December 10, 2022
The next groups continue to battle and vye winning to earn 100 points for their first elimination. The rehearsals and performances of Da Coconut Nut and Team Hexorphic's performance of Aawitin Ko, Isasayaw Mo, as well as the rehearsal of Team C Vision were aired in this episode.
8	"#DreamMakerMission1Done"	December 11, 2022
The final groups continue to battle until the 5 winning groups are revealed and earn 100 points each. Team C Vision's performance of Aawitin Ko, Isasayaw Mo and the rest of the teams performed on stage. At the end of the episode, host Kim Chiu announced that only 44 Dream Chasers will advance to the first elimination.
9	"#DreamMakerExtraMoments"	December 17, 2022
This episode is a recapitulation of the never-before-seen extra moments of the show, from the first mentors' evaluation to the theme song evaluation, as well as some unseen footage of the Dream Chasers while living in their dormitories. Dream Chasers then attended the mall show with K-pop groups Lapillus and TFN, with the latter having a meet-and-greet session with the Dream Chasers. During the theme song evaluation, mentor Darren Espanto had a surprise visit with the Dream Chasers to assess the Dream Chasers' progress in the theme song.
10	"#DreamMakerCatchup"	December 18, 2022
Catch up with the Dream Chasers as the recapitulation of extra moments continue.
11	"#DreamMaker2ndRanking"	December 24, 2022
The show started by having a poll for the "Chosen Oppa" (the most visual-looking Dream Chaser) and the "Most Wanted Chingu" (the Dream Chaser they wanted to become friends with). Host Ryan Bang announced to the Dream Chasers about the results of the poll, with Onie de Guzman won the Chosen Oppa while Reyster Yton won the Most Wanted Chingu. The show then continued with ranks 1-44 will be in the Safe Zone, while ranks 45 onwards will be on the Danger Zone (at risk of being eliminated). Host Kim Chiu only announced the Mentors' ranking in this episode, which is based only on the Dream Mentors' points in the Group Battle. She then called the Dream Chasers by batches (in order of their ranking from the 1st Mentors' evaluation) to announce the names of the Dream Chasers who will be on the Safe Zone and Danger Zone, as well as their Mentors' Ranking. The show ended when Kim called Omar Uddin, who ranked 44th in the Dream Mentors' Ranking, announced his scores from both the mentors and public points.
12	"#DreamMakerElims"	December 25, 2022
One by one, Kim Chiu announces each of the Dream Makers' points from the mentors and the public. Jeromy Batac takes the 1st place, with 1,478 points, while Neil Limbaga finished 44th place, just narrowly missed the elimination. The episode ends with the contestants comforting the eliminated Dream Chasers.
13	"#DreamMakerMission2"	December 31, 2022
Host Ryan Bang tells the Dream Chasers their next mission: Position Mission. The Dream Chasers chose their desired positions (higher-rank Dream Chasers have the priority of securing a spot in the positions). The rehearsals and performance of Team A-7's Bang was aired in this episode.
14	"#DreamMakerAja2023"	January 1, 2023
The Position Mission continues as the performances and rehearsals of the songs Habang Buhay, Marikit, and Amazon were aired in this episode.
15	"#DreamMakerPositionMission"	January 7, 2023
The Position Mission continues as the performances and rehearsals of the songs Left and Right and Kabataan Para sa Kinabukasan were aired in this episode.
16	"#DreamMakerMission2Done"	January 8, 2023
The remaining songs for the position mission, Alive, and Tuloy Pa Rin, were aired in this episode. Also, it was announced that Josh Labing-isa, Jeromy Batac, and Russu Laurente got the Best Vocals, Best Dancer, and Best Rapper positions, respectively.
17	"#DreamMaker3rdRanking"	January 14, 2023
The show then continued with ranks 1-28 will be in the Safe Zone, while ranks 29 onwards will be on the Danger Zone (at risk of being eliminated). Host Kim Chiu only announced the Mentors' ranking, which is based only on the Dream Mentors' points in the Position Missions. She then called the Dream Chasers by batches (in order of their ranking from the 1st elimination) to announce the names of the Dream Chasers who will be on the Safe Zone and Danger Zone, as well as their Mentors' Ranking. The show then ended, with some Dream Chasers entered the Top 28 and left the stage.
18	"#DreamMakerTop28"	January 15, 2023
The elimination round continues, with Kim Chiu announces each of the Dream Makers' points from the mentors and the public one at a time. Jeromy Batac once again took the 1st place, with 1,359 points, while Asi Gatdula, who was part of the Top 7 last elimination, finished in 28th place, nearly being eliminated in the competition. The episode ends with the contestants being emotional about the eliminated Dream Chasers.
19	"#DreamMakerKPOPchallenge"	January 21, 2023
The show started with Dream Mentor Angeline Quinto gave the next mission to the 44 Dream Chasers (New K-pop Song Launch Mission). One by one, the Dream Chasers selected the song they wanted to perform. It was announced that not all of them will perform the song, and only those who survived the second elimination will get to perform. As they prepare for Mission 3, a special gift was given to them: making a day-in-a-life vlog. Unaware to the Dream Chasers, their loved ones will surprise them and their will get to see the Dream Chasers perform live. The performances and rehearsals of the songs Odd Eye and Hit Me were aired in this episode.
20	"#DreamMakerMission3Done"	January 22, 2023
The remaining songs, Lovey Dovey, and Tiger were aired in this episode. Also, the results of the winning teams as announced, with Team Hunters got the second-highest average score and Team Topick got the highest average score.
21	"#DreamMakerMission3Rewards"	January 28, 2023
The heartwarming moments of Dream Chasers with their families continue. Team Topick receives an unexpected surprise as a reward. Later, the third mission winners open up about their experience in performing in two Kapamilya shows.
22	"#DreamMakerForTheChingus"	January 29, 2023
Fans and supporters show all their love and appreciation as their favorite Dream Chasers serve hot performances and participate in fun games during three separate "Dream Maker" mall shows.
23	"#DreamMaker4thRanking"	February 4, 2023
The competition continues to heat up as Kim Chiu makes a nerve-racking announcement just before the first batch of eliminated Dream Chasers bids farewell.
24	"#DreamMakerTop16"	February 5, 2023
The tension reaches another peak as Kim Chiu announces the names of the Dream Chasers who have garnered enough points to continue their journey and complete the competition's top 16. For the first time, Vinci Malizon took the 1st place seat, while Prince Encelan ranked 16th, almost being eliminated from the show. Before the episode ends, host Kim Chiu announced that the final voting cycle will be purely public votes.
25	"#DreamMakerTheFinalMission"	February 11, 2023
The show started with Dream Chasers playing a headphones game. The heartwarming messages of the Dream Chasers to their fellow Dream Chasers were also aired in this episode. Also, host Kim Chiu gave them their final mission.
26	"#DreamMakerTheDreamFinale"	February 12, 2023
The final mission performances, held at the Caloocan Sports Complex, were aired in this episode. Special performances of TFN's Amazon and Mission 3 songs with BINI, BGYO, Dream Mentors Darren and Bailey, as well as host Kim Chiu, were performed after the final mission performances. Before announcing the final Top 7, the Dream Chasers performed Salamat, as a tribute to their fans. After the song, Kim Chiu announced that the group name will be named HORI7ON. After the commercial break, Kim Chiu announced the Final 7 from 6th to 3rd, with Kim Ng, Reyster Yton, Vinci Malizon, and Kyler Chua getting those seats, respectively. Laurenti Dyogi and Lee Hyoung-jin announced the ranks for the rank 2 and 1 Dream Chasers, respectively. It was announced that Marcus Cabais and Jeromy Batac got 2nd and 1st ranks, respectively. Before announcing the 7th-ranked Dream Chaser, host Kim Chiu announced the ranks who didn't make the cut from 16th to 9th place. It was announced by Kim Chiu that Winston Pineda got the 7th rank, beating 8th-placer Drei Amahan by about 800,000 votes. The episode ends with the eliminated Dream Chasers leaving the Dream Chasers, and Kim Chiu introduced once again the members of HORI7ON.

== Discography ==
=== Promotional singles ===
List of promotional singles, showing year released, selected chart positions, and name of the album
Title	Year	Peak chart positions		Album	Ref(s)
Title	Year	PHL Songs	KOR Circle	Album	Ref(s)
"Take My Hand"	2022	—	—	Non-album digital single	
"—" denotes a recording that did not chart or was not released in that territory

== Aftermath ==
Following the show's last episode, the formed group Hori7on signed their exclusive contracts with ABS-CBN Entertainment (now ABS-CBN Studios) and MLD Entertainment on March 10, 2023. Their pre-debut single "Dash" was released on March 22, 2023 with an accompanying music video. The pre-debut single received a positive feedback from viewers, with the music video amassing 1.7 million views on YouTube within 48 hours. "Dash" was followed by two more digital singles—"Salamat", released on April 5, 2023; and "Lovey Dovey", released on May 31, 2023. Hori7on appeared on the Mnet reality show 100 Days Miracle before debuting with the album "Friend-Ship" on July 24, 2023.

On April 29, 2023, the other contestants Wilson Budoy (10th), Thad Sune (11th), Macky Tuason (14th), Jom Aceron (15th) and Josh Labing-isa (16th) had signed contracts with MLD Entertainment. In an interview with entertainment website KpopMap, MLD Entertainment CEO Lee Hyung-jin stated that he intends to debut the group, tentatively known as New MLD Boys, in South Korea, before engaging in "active promotions in the Philippines", while using the production systems present in South Korea. The quintet was later introduced as the boy band New Id.

On July 9, 2023, Prince Encelan (9th) said in an interview with PUSH.com.ph that he will be signing an exclusive recording contract with Star Music and an artist co-management contract with ABS-CBN and Artist Circle. His debut single "Indak" was released on August 25, 2023.

== Companion show ==
The reality television show has a companion show titled Dream Maker: Pause and Play which aired on PIE Channel from January 9 to March 31, 2023.
