= Salamat (Hori7on song) =

- Digital cover

Promotional single by Hori7on

from the album Friend-Ship
- Language: Filipino
- English title: "Thank you"
- Released: April 5, 2023
- Studio: ABS-CBN Studios
- Genre: Pop
- Length: 3:36
- Label: MLD
- Songwriters: Bull$eye; Ondine; Kim Jin-sol; Lee Na-young

Music video
- "Salamat (고마워)" on YouTube

"Salamat" (Korean: 고마워; RR: Gomawo; lit. 'Thank you') is a song by the Filipino boy band Hori7on It was released on April 5, 2023, by MLD Entertainment, and distributed by Kakao Entertainment, as one of the group's pre-debut digital singles.

== Background and release ==
"Salamat" is one of two pre-debut digital singles released by Hori7on prior to their departure to South Korea, the other being "Dash". The song was first performed at the finale of Dream Maker, to express the show's gratitude for its viewers.

The song was recorded by Hori7on, and was released for digital download on April 5, 2023. A teaser for the song was released a day prior to the song's release. The song, along with the two other pre-debut singles released by the group, was later included in the group's debut album, Friend-Ship.

== Composition ==
The song is composed in the key of A major and carries an average tempo of 160 beats per minute. The song features a spoken word verse from Vinci and Reyster. Billed as a "fan song", the song's lyrics has been described as a "love letter" to the group's fans, expressing gratitude to them for their support.

== Music video ==
The song's music video plays clips from the group's fan shows, snippets of Dream Maker, and behind-the-scenes footage from the group.

== Live performances ==
The song was performed at the group's first fan meet.

== Credits and personnel ==
Credits adapted from the credits of the song's music video:

- Hori7on – vocals
- Bull$eye – lyricist, composer, arranger
- Kim Jin-sol – lyricist, composer, arranger, synths, drums, programming
- Lee Na-young – lyricist
- Ondine – lyricist, composer
- Yoon Young-bok – chorus
- Choi Young-hoon – guitar
- Hyun Woo-bin – digital editor
- Team AMG – mixing and mastering

== Track listing ==
- Digital
1. "Salamat" – 3:36
2. "Salamat" (instrumental) – 3:36

== Release history ==
Release dates and formats for "Salamat"
Region	Date	Format	Label	Ref.
Various	April 5, 2023	Digital download; streaming	MLD	
