= Lapillus =

Lapillus (pl.: lapilli) may refer to:

- Lapilli, a size classification term for tephra
- One of the otoliths in finfish
- Lapillus (group), a South Korean girl group
