= Lovey Dovey (disambiguation) =

"Lovey Dovey" is a popular American rhythm and blues song originating in the 1950s.

Lovey Dovey may also refer to:

- "Lovey Dovey" (Hori7on song), 2023
- "Lovey-Dovey" (T-ara song), 2012
- Lovey Dovey (TV series), a 2016 Thai television series

== See also ==
- LoveyDove, an American musical duo
- Romance (love)
