= Daytour =

- Digital cover

Single album by Hori7on
- Released: March 2, 2024
- Genre: Pop-punk
- Length: 6:02
- Label: MLD
- Producers: Bull$eye (Avec); Greenism (Avec); Honeybear (Avec); How; Meang Co; MonkeyVegas (Avec)

Hori7on chronology
Friend-Ship (2023)	Daytour (2024)	Daytour 2 (2024)

Singles from Lucky
- 1. "Lucky" Released: March 2, 2024

Daytour is the first single album by South Korea-based Filipino boy band Hori7on. The album was released on March 2, 2024, through MLD Entertainment, eight months following the group's debut album Friend-Ship (2023). Daytour is led by the upbeat pop-punk single "Lucky", which was described as a "vocal and dance extravaganza" that expresses the members' love for the people close to them.

== Background ==
Hori7on debuted on July 24, 2023, with the 21-track studio album Friend-Ship. In an interview with the Korea JoongAng Daily on December 29, 2023, leader Vinci Malizon indicated that the group aims to develop a trademark "youthful and bright sound" with their future releases. On November 22, MLD Entertainment set the schedule for the group's next release in January 2024, hinting at a single that celebrates "the New Year and wishes luck in 2024".

On February 14, 2024, MLD formally announced the group's sophomore release Daytour, the group's first single album.

== Composition and reception ==
Daytour has a runtime of six minutes and two seconds and contains two tracks. The album is led by the single "Lucky", which was touted as a pop-punk, "hi-teen confession song". Malizon described the track as having a "upbeat, youthful, fresh 'high teen' vibe" associated with their debut album Friend-Ship. Hannah Mallorca of the Philippine Daily Inquirer noted the song as a "vocal and dance extravaganza" while recognizing the track as a "display of love for people who matter to them, including their families and dedicated fans or Anchors". "Lucky" is accompanied by an instrumental version in the single album release.

== Release and promotion ==
Daytour was released on March 2, 2024, as the group's first single album and their first release in over eight months. The album's release was accompanied with a showcase held at the Samsung Hall at the SM Aura in Taguig on the night of the album's release. To promote the album, Hori7on collaborated with SM Supermalls for a mall tour across the Philippines. The tour began on March 15, at SM Lanang in Davao City and concluded on April 13, at SM City Cebu. Amid promotions for the album, member Winston Pineda briefly took a hiatus for the funeral of his brother.

Malizon participated in the creation of the digital cover for the single. Concept photos were released in the run-up to the album's release.

== Track listing ==
Friend-Ship track listing
No.	Title	Lyrics	Music	Arrangement	Length
1.	"Lucky"	Bull$eye (Avec); Greenism; How; Meang Co; MonkeyVegas (Avec)	Bull$eye (Avec); Honeybear (Avec); Meang Co; MonkeyVegas (Avec)	Honeybear (Avec); MonkeyVegas (Avec)	3:01
2.	"Lucky" (Inst.)		Bull$eye (Avec); Honeybear (Avec); Meang Co; MonkeyVegas (Avec)	Honeybear (Avec); MonkeyVegas (Avec)	3:01
Total length:					6:02

== Credits and personnel ==
- Bull$eye (Avec) – composition, lyrics
- Greenism (Avec) – lyrics
- Honeybear (Avec) – arrangement, composition
- How – lyrics
- Meang Co – composition, lyrics
- MonkeyVegas (Avec) – arrangement, composition, lyrics

== Release history ==
Release dates and formats for Daytour
Region	Date	Format	Label	Ref.
Various	March 2, 2024	Digital download; streaming	MLD	
