= Dash (Hori7on song) =

- Digital cover

Promotional single by Hori7on

from the album Friend-Ship
- Released: March 22, 2023
- Recorded: 2023
- Studio: ABS-CBN Studios
- Genre: Pop; hip-hop; EDM
- Length: 3:09
- Label: MLD
- Songwriters: Avec; Bull$eye; MonkeyVegas; How (Kor); Meang Co

Music video
- "Dash" on YouTube

"Dash" is a song by the Filipino boy band Hori7on. It was released on March 22, 2023, by MLD Entertainment, and distributed by Kakao Entertainment, as one of the group's pre-debut digital singles.

== Background and release ==
"Dash" was one of the two songs presented to the contestants of Dream Maker to perform for their fourth and final "mission" on the show, along with "Deja Vu", which was written by Seo Won-jin. The song was first performed at the show's finale, performed by contestants Jay-R Albino, Jeromy Batac, Kim Ng, Kyler Chua, Matt Cruz, Prince Encelan, Wilson Budoy, and Winston Pineda.

The song was recorded by the final members of Hori7on and was released as one of the group's pre-debut digital singles on March 22, 2023. In an interview with CNN Philippines, leader Vinci Malizon revealed that the taping for the music video lasted for two days.

The song, along with the two other pre-debut singles released by the group, was later included in the group's debut album, Friend-Ship.

== Composition ==
The song, written by Bull$eye, is described as a pop, hip-hop, EDM song. Rafael Bautista of Nylon Manila remarked that the song is "laced with confidence and self-assurance. The song is composed in the key of A major, and carries an average tempo of 165 beats per minute.

== Reception ==
The song topped the Philippines' iTunes chart on March 28, 2023. Online, the music video garnered a positive response from viewers, with praise being centered on the group's vocal performance, as well as the song's choreography.

== Music video ==
The music video goes through multiple sets—an abandoned building, an aircraft hangar, an airport runway, a rooftop with a helipad, and a shipping yard.

== Live performances ==
The song was performed by Hori7on on February 15, 2023, on It's Showtime as part of their pre-debut promotional activities. The song was also performed by the group at their promotional mall shows, as well as their first fan meeting held on April 22, 2023.

== Credits and personnel ==
Credits adapted from Genius:

- Hori7on – vocals
- Avec – writer, lyricist, composer
- Bull$eye – lyricist, arranger
- Calvin (Kor) – recording engineer
- Hyun Woo-bin – digital editor
- MonkeyVegas – writer, drums, programmer, composer, synthesizer
- Ondine – writer, lyricist, arranger, composer
- Team AMG – mixing engineer, mastering engineer

== Track listing ==
- Digital
1. "Dash" – 3:09
2. "Dash" (instrumental) – 3:09

== Release history ==
Release dates and formats for "Dash"
Region	Date	Format	Label	Ref.
Various	March 22, 2023	Digital download; streaming	MLD	
