= Six7een =

Single by Hori7on

from the album Friend-Ship
- Language: Korean; English
- Released: July 24, 2023
- Studio: Dart Studio; MLD Studio
- Genre: Dance; K-pop; P-pop
- Length: 3:11
- Label: MLD
- Composers: Vermillion Frame (Avec); Chamaru; Akac; Seongbae; Meang Co
- Lyricists: Vermillion Frame (Avec); Meang Co

Hori7on singles chronology
"Six7een" (2023)	"Birthday" (2023)

Music video
- "Six7een" on YouTube

"Six7een" is a song recorded by South Korea-based Filipino boy band Hori7on, taken from their debut studio album Friend-Ship (2023). It was released as the album's lead single on July 24, 2023, through MLD Entertainment. A dance track, the song was written by Vermillion Frame and Meang Co. It incorporates a bassline melody in its chorus, and carries an overall message of enjoying one's youth.

A music video featuring elements of a "high-teen" concept accompanied the single. Hori7on promoted the single through live performances on music programs M Countdown, Music Bank, Simply K-Pop, Show! Music Core, Inkigayo, and The Show. The group subsequently included the song in its set-list for the Voyage to Manila concert in September 2023.

== Background and release ==
On July 4, 2023, MLD Entertainment announced Hori7on's debut studio album, Friend-Ship. The track list of the album was later released online on July 12, where "Six7een", its second track, was marked as the album's lead single. MLD Entertainment released the first teaser trailer for the single on July 14, while second teaser trailer for the single followed on July 21.

In the run-up to the album's release, audio snippets of the song's chorus were released on the video platform TikTok, alongside videos of the members performing to the snippet. An audio snippet of the song was included in a "highlight medley" for the album that also featured other snippets from the album.

The single was released alongside the album on July 24. The album also included the song's instrumental as its final track.

== Composition ==
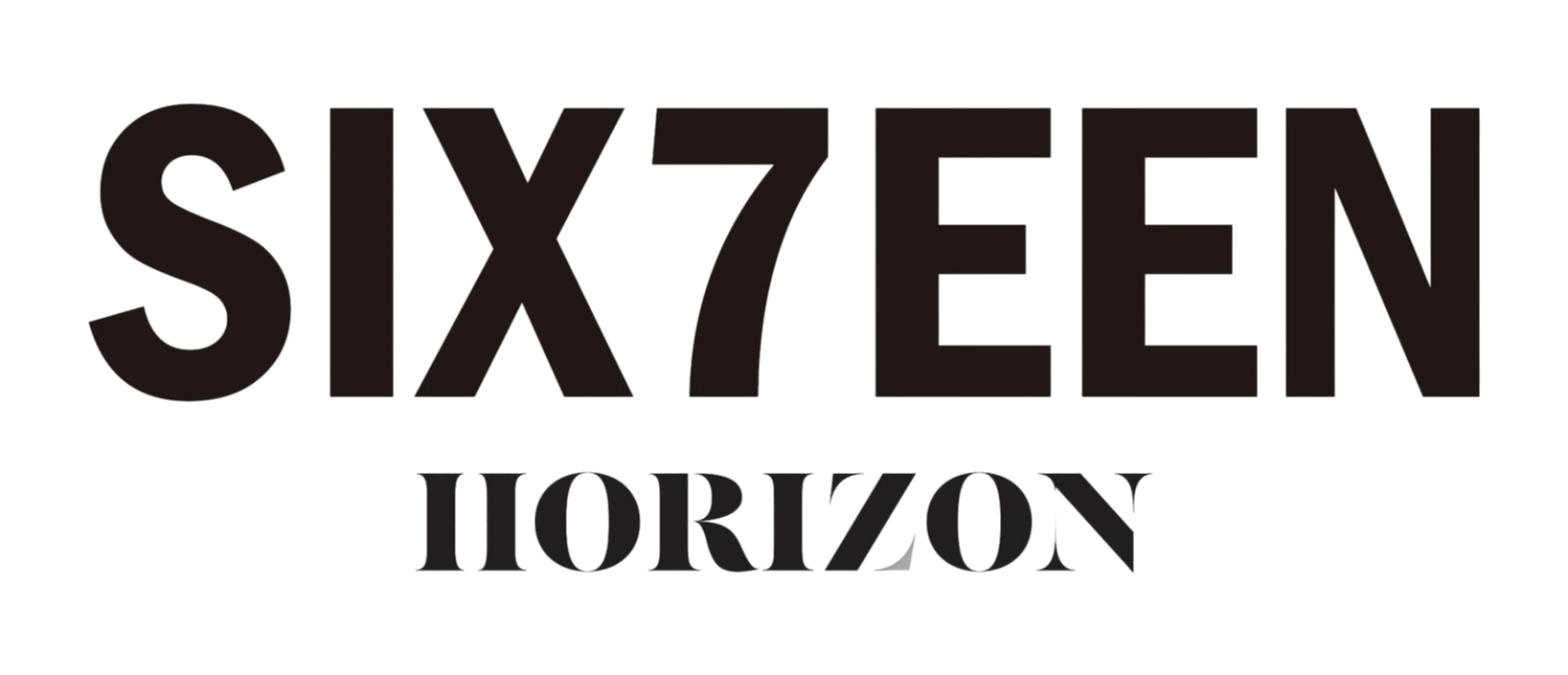
Word mark for "Six7een".

"Six7een" is a dance song written by Vermillion Frame and Meang Co. The song's title is derived from "six", which represents "the members' multiple skills and talents", and "teen", which represents the group's "youthful energy".

With a runtime of three minutes and 11 seconds, the song is composed in the key of F-sharp major and carries an average tempo of 125 bpm. The song is characterized by an "addictive melody and bassline" in its chorus. Lyrically, the song sends "a message to everyone to let go of their worries and live in the now as you are only young once". In an interview with the Inquirer, Vinci described the song as a "summery track that you can listen to while on a road trip or having a party".

== Music video and live performances ==
The accompanying music video for "Six7een" was released concurrently with the album on July 24. The music video sees the members perform in vividly colored suits as part of a high-teen concept. The Philippine Star reported that the music video for "Six7een" surpassed two million views on YouTube within 24 hours.

Hori7on performed "Six7een" at their debut showcase at the Olympic Hall on July 24, alongside other album tracks, including "How You Feel" and "Death or Paradise". The septet also performed the song at their Voyage To Manila concert at the Smart Araneta Coliseum on September 9.

The group appeared on several South Korean music programs to promote the single in the weeks following its release, beginning with Mnet's M Countdown on July 27, where they performed the single as part of their debut stage, becoming the first all-Filipino boy band to perform on the show. The group later promoted the single on KBS2's Music Bank, Arirang TV's Simply K-Pop, MBC TV's Show! Music Core, SBS's Inkigayo, and SBS MTV's The Show, where they were nominated for "The Show Choice".

== Reception ==
"Six7een" generally received a positive reception from Philippine-based publications. Writing for Nylon Manila, Rafael Bautista deemed the track as the highlight of Friend-Ship, stating that the song and its title combines "the group's talents and the youthful energy they exude". Jashley Ann Cruz of GMA News described the song's lyrics as "youthful".

== Credits and personnel ==
Credits for the single are adapted from Melon.

Studios

- MLD Studio – recording
- Dart Studio – mixing, mastering

Personnel

- Hori7on – vocals
- Vermillion Frame – lyrics, composition, arrangement
- Meang Co – lyrics, composition
- Chamaru – composition
- Akac – composition
- Seongbae – composition
- Bull$eye – recording, digital editing
- Ondine (Vermilion Frame) – synthesizer
- Jinju (Vermillion Frame) – drums, programming
- Ley – Chorus
- Team AMG – mixing, mastering

== Release history ==
Release dates and formats for "Six7een"
Region	Date	Format	Label	Ref.
Various	July 24, 2023	Digital download; streaming	MLD	
