= Marcus Cabais =

Filipino actor and singer (born 2009)

Marcus
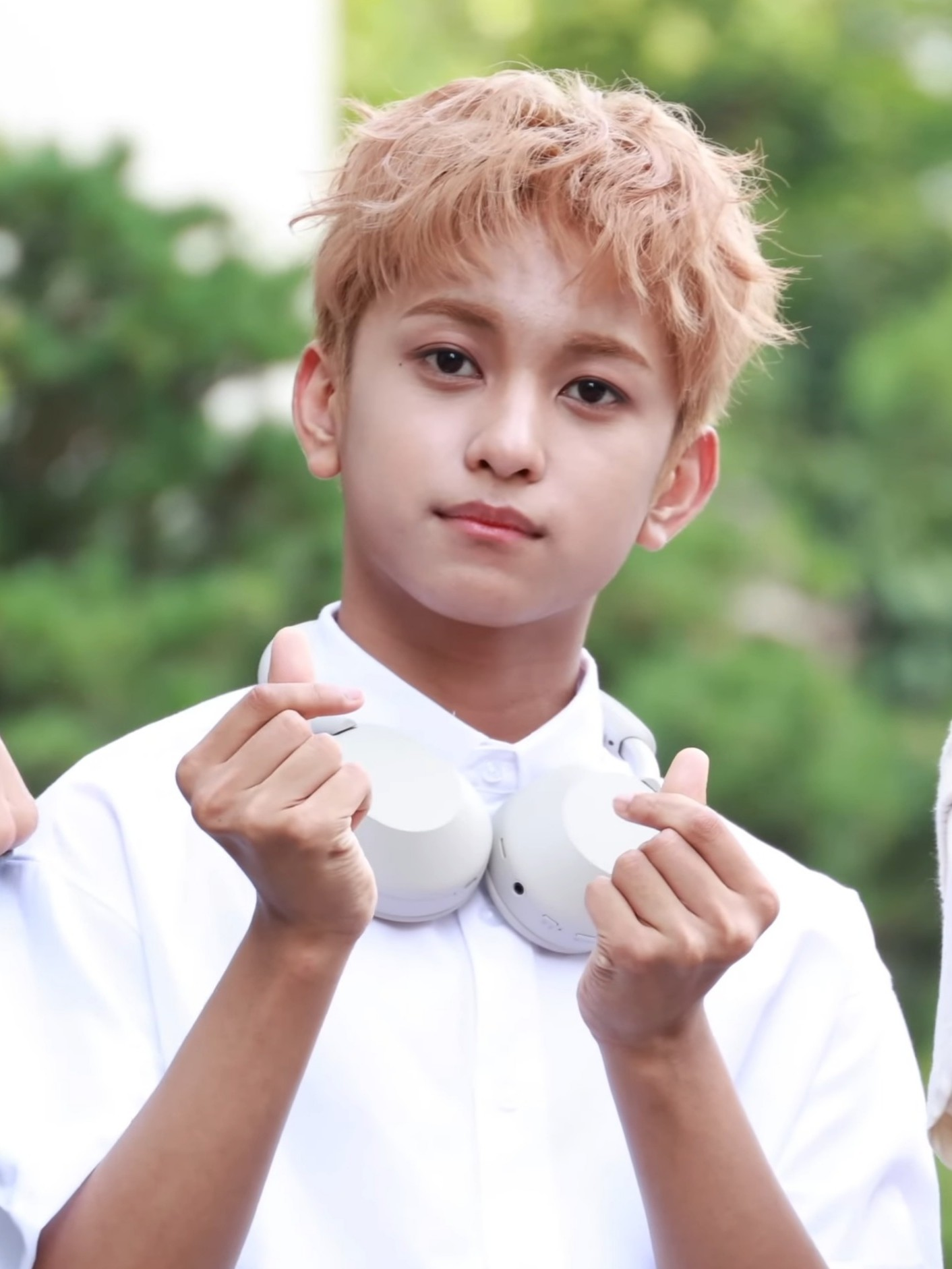
- Marcus in August 2023
- Born: Marcus Rayden Cabais; August 31, 2009 (age 16); Bataan, Philippines
- Occupations: Singer; actor
- Known for: Team Yey! Hori7on
- Musical career
- Genres: K-pop; P-pop
- Instrument: Vocals
- Years active: 2023–present
- Label: MLD
- Member of: Hori7on

Marcus Rayden Cabais (born August 31, 2009), also known mononymously as Marcus, is a Filipino singer and actor. He is a member and vocalist of the South Korea-based Filipino boy band Hori7on under ABS-CBN and MLD Entertainment, as a winning contestant of the reality survival show Dream Maker (2022–23).

Marcus previously starred in Regal Films's My 2 Mommies (2018), Team Yey! and performed in the touring company of The Lion King musical from 2018 to 2020.

== Life and career ==
Marcus was born in Bataan, Philippines on August 31, 2009. In 2015, he competed in It's Showtime's children's segment "Mini Me", where he imitated American singer-songwriter Jon Bon Jovi He returned in the second season of the segment two years after as a Wildcard performer. In 2016, Cabais won as the Boy Grand Winner in SM Supermalls's program SM Little Stars.

=== 2018–2020: Film and theatrical debuts ===
In 2018, Marcus made his film debut in Regal Films's My 2 Mommies, directed by Eric Quizon. He was cast in the role of Tristan, the son of Manu and Monique, who are portrayed by Paolo Ballesteros and Solenn Heussaff, respectively. His performance in the movie received a positive reception from critics; Joseph Atilano of the Philippine Daily Inquirer opined that he played the central part in the film, commenting that he was "the glue that held this movie together", and that he "carried himself throughout as if he was already a veteran of many movies".

From 2018 through 2020, Marcus performed as young Simba as part of an Asian touring company of The Lion King musical. In the same year, he joined Team Yey!, a Philippine children's television show created by Yey!, wherein he showcased his talent in music during the "Sound Check" segment.

=== 2022–present: Dream Maker and Hori7on ===
In 2022, Marcus participated in Dream Maker, a reality competition show broadcast on Kapamilya Channel and A2Z which determined the lineup of an upcoming boy band from a field of 62 contestants, to be jointly managed by ABS-CBN and MLD Entertainment. Among the contestants, Marcus was the youngest, at 13-years-old. His performance on the pilot episode was praised; mentor Bae Yoon-jung commented: "At your age, I didn't expect that you are that good".

Throughout the show, Marcus consistently performed well, staying within the top 7 after each round, allowing him to advance to the finals, where he placed second and made the lineup of Hori7on. He debuted with the group as one of its vocalists on July 24, 2023, with the release of their debut album, Friend-Ship, where he, and his co-members, served as writers to the fourth track, "Mama".

== Artistry ==
In an interview with PhilStar Life, Marcus cited BGYO and BTS's Jungkook as musical influences.

== Stage ==
=== Theatre ===
Year	Title	Role	Venue	Notes	Ref.
2018–20	The Lion King	Young Simba	The Sands Theatre, Marina Bay Sands, Singapore		
2018–20	The Lion King	Young Simba	Gyemyeong Art Center, Daegu, South Korea		
2018–20	The Lion King	Young Simba	Seoul Arts Center, Seoul, South Korea		
2018–20	The Lion King	Young Simba	Dream Theater, Busan, South Korea		
2018–20	The Lion King	Young Simba	Taipei Arena, Taipei, Taiwan		
2018–20	The Lion King	Young Simba	Muangthai Rachadalai Theatre, Bangkok, Thailand		
2018–20	The Lion King	Young Simba	AsiaWorld–Expo, Hong Kong		

== Filmography ==
=== Film ===
Year	Title	Role	Notes	Ref.
2018	My 2 Mommies	Tristan Jose-Castillo	Debut film	

=== Television ===
Year	Title	Role	Notes	Ref.
2015	It's Showtime: "Mini Me"	Contestant	Season 1; competed as mini Jon Bon Jovi	
2017	It's Showtime: "Mini Me"	Contestant	Season 2: Wildcard Round; competed as mini Jon Bon Jovi	
2018	Team Yey!	Himself	Host	
2022–23	Dream Maker	Contestant	Second place; joined Hori7on	
2023	100 Days Miracle	Himself	As a member of Hori7on	
