= Hori7on =

South Korea-based Filipino boy band

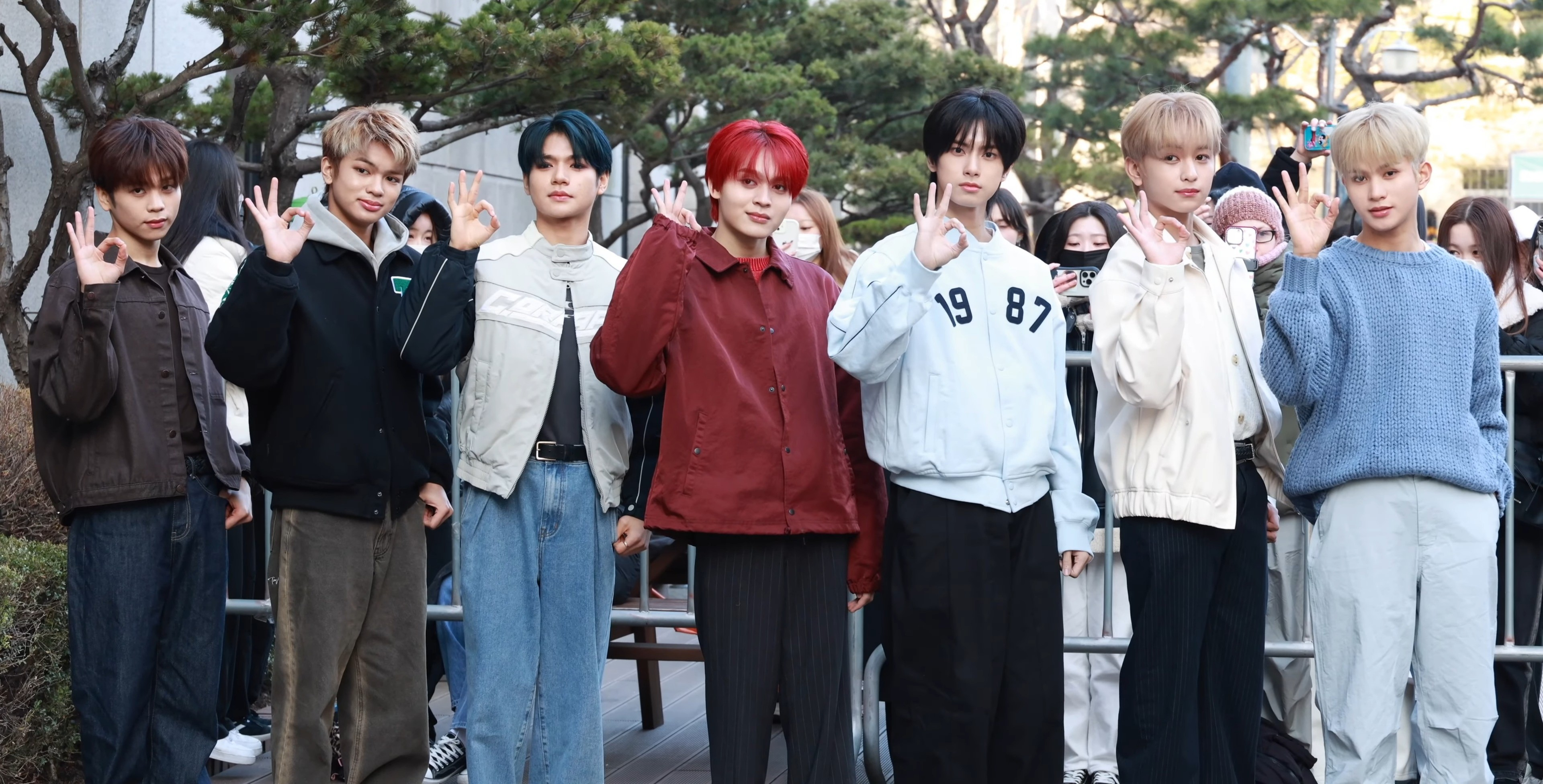
- Hori7on in March 2024; Left to right: Vinci, Jeromy, Kim, Reyster, Kyler, Marcus, and Winston

Background information
- Origin: Manila, Philippines
- Genres: K-pop; P-pop
- Years active: 2023–present
- Label: MLD
- Members: Vinci; Kim; Kyler; Reyster; Winston; Jeromy; Marcus
- Website: en.mldenter.com

Hori7on (Korean: 호라이즌; pronounced "horizon"; stylized in all caps) is a Filipino boy band formed in 2023. The group consists of seven members: Vinci, Kim, Kyler, Reyster, Winston, Jeromy, and Marcus. Formed by MLD Entertainment and ABS-CBN Corporation through the survival reality show Dream Maker (2022–23), the group is the first all-Filipino boy band act to debut in South Korea.

Hori7on made their debut in South Korea in July 2023, with the release of their debut studio album Friend-Ship, which was preceded by the release of three pre-debut promotional singles—"Dash", "Salamat", and "Lovey Dovey". The group released their first single album Daytour in March 2024, which was followed by the single album Daytour 2 in August. They released their fifth single, "Cold", in March 2025, followed by "Lunod" and "Fly With It" in February and May 2026 respectively.

In August 2026, they departed from MLD and ABS-CBN after the former company failed to fulfill contractual obligations, continuing as independent artists based in the Philippines.

== History ==
=== Pre-debut activities and formation ===
Logo used during debut

On September 7, 2022, executives from ABS-CBN Corporation, MLD Entertainment, and Kamp Global signed a deal to debut a Filipino boy band in South Korea that will be trained and managed by the three companies.

The members of the project boy band were determined through the survival competition series Dream Maker, which aired on A2Z and Kapamilya Channel from November 19, 2022, to February 12, 2023, featuring 62 contestants competing to be part of the group. At the conclusion of the show, Jeromy Batac, Marcus Cabais, Kyler Chua, Vinci Malizon, Reyster Yton, Kim Ng, and Winston Pineda were selected to form the lineup of Hori7on.

The lineup of the group included several members who have held prior experience in the entertainment industry. Cabais started as a child actor, making his film debut in 2018, in Regal Films' My 2 Mommies, and later making appearances on It's Showtime and Team Yey!, before being part of a touring company of The Lion King musical, playing the role of young Simba from 2018 to 2020; in 2017, Batac performed on Little Big Shots; and in 2022, Ng competed on TV5's survival reality show, Top Class.

The group's name, Hori7on, was selected by a TV audience and refers to "the dreams of seven boys, who started on the same line, gathered in one place, and face the same goal", according to the name's submitter.

=== 2023: Promotional releases and debut with Friend-Ship ===
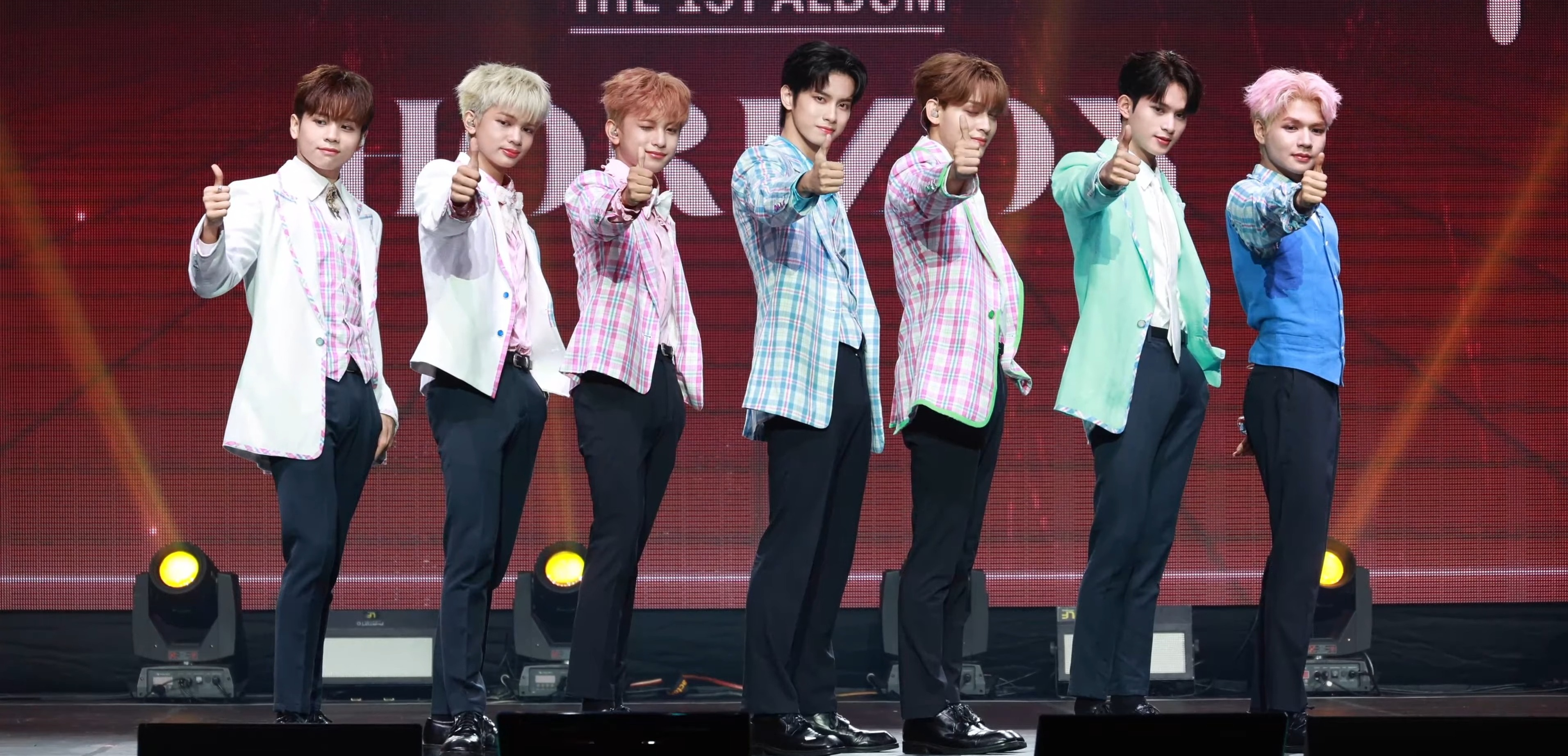
Hori7on at their debut showcase in July 2023.

The members of Hori7on signed their exclusive contracts with ABS-CBN and MLD in a press event on March 10, 2023. While in the Philippines, the septet embarked on a mall show tour, and held their first fan meeting event at the New Frontier Theater on April 22.

While MLD announced a June 2023 debut for the group, ABS-CBN later reported that the group will debut in July. Leading up to their debut, the group released three pre-debut digital singles: "Dash", released on March 22; "Salamat", released on April 5; and "Lovey Dovey", released on May 31. The group's preparations for their debut was the subject of the reality show 100 Days Miracle, which premiered on Mnet on July 7. During this time, the group performed at the 2023 PPOPCON via screencast at the Smart Araneta Coliseum on July 16. The group debuted on July 24, with their first studio album, Friend-Ship. The album was supported by two singles: "Six7een", released with the album, and "Birthday", which was released on August 25. To promote the album, the group staged the one-off Voyage To Manila concert on September 9, at the Smart Araneta Coliseum. The group held their first overseas performance at Kamp Fest, held from on August 19 to 20, at Mexico City, Mexico. (Note: On August 16, MLD Entertainment announced that the Mexican Immigration Office notified the agency that Jeromy and Marcus, then both minors, were not allowed to perform in the festival due to age limitations set by Mexican minor labor policies.)

Later that year, Hori7on won the Focus Award for music at the 8th Asia Artist Awards, held at the Philippine Arena on December 14. The group, along with Ben&Ben and SB19, were the first Filipino acts to participate in the awards ceremony.

=== 2024: Daytour and Daytour 2 ===
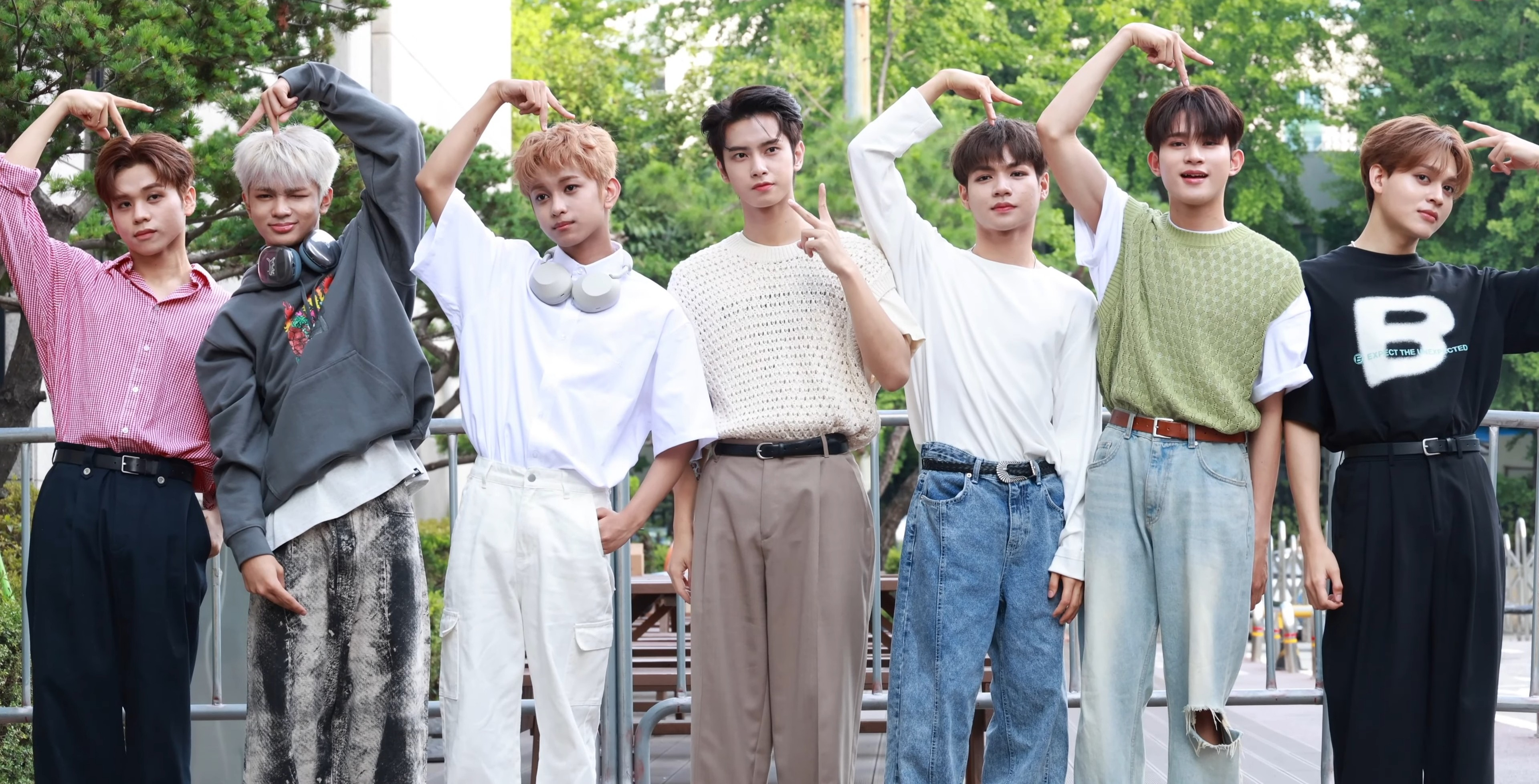
Hori7on in August 2023

The group performed at the opening ceremonies of the 2024 Winter Youth Olympics on January 19, 2024, making history as the first Filipino Act to ever be part of the line up and perform at any Olympic ceremony. On February 14, 2024, the agency announced the septet's first single album Daytour. The album and its lead single "Lucky" were released on March 2. To promote the album, Hori7on embarked on a mall tour across the Philippines in collaboration with SM Supermalls from March 15 to April 13.

The band released its second single album, Daytour 2, on August 13, which included "Sumayaw Sumunod", a cover of the 1978 song by the Boyfriends. In support of Daytour and Daytour 2, the band held their second headlining concert Anchor High on November 3, at the SM Mall of Asia Arena.

=== 2025–present: "Cold", "Lunod", and departure from MLD and ABS-CBN ===
Hori7on released their fifth single "Cold", their first release in over six months, on March 17, 2025. On May 26, the band joined the Atin Ito Coalition in their third civilian mission to the West Philippine Sea to perform in a concert as part of a peacekeeping effort that aimed to promote dialogue and cultural exchange. On November 21, the band released the digital single "Pahinga", as part of the original soundtrack for the film Rekonek, an entry to the 2025 Metro Manila Film Festival where it was nominated for Best Original Theme Song.

On February 26, 2026, the group released their sixth single "Lunod". In March, National Commission for Culture and the Arts named Hori7on, together with Ben&Ben, Cup of Joe, and TJ Monterde, as the Philippine representatives to the 2026 ASEAN Round Festival in April. For the festival, the group collaborated with Kaia and 1st.One for the promotional single "Sulong", which served as the opening song for the event.

They earned two nominations at the 35th Seoul Music Awards, becoming the first Filipino act to be nominated in the show's history.

On August 13, the group terminated their exclusive contracts with MLD and ABS-CBN after the former company failed to address their breaches in contractual obligations. They announced their departure from the companies on September 4 through their legal counsel and confirmed they will continue as a group in the Philippines as independent artists.

== Artistry ==
=== Public image ===
South Korean publications including The Korea Herald and The Korea Times have identified Hori7on as the first all-Filipino boy band to debut in South Korea. The latter paper attributed their formation to the globalization of the K-pop industry, which has seen the emergence of non-Korean artists within South Korea. In the Philippines, the Daily Tribune and The Philippine Star have regarded the group as "P-Pop Superstars" for their fandom activity and accolades.

=== Musical style ===
With training from both Filipino and South Korean mentors, outlets like The Philippine Star has identified the group's work as "combination of the K-pop and P-pop genres", which the band promotes as "Global pop".

== Endorsements ==
On July 6, 2024, Hori7on were named as the Philippine brand ambassadors of audio equipment manufacturer JBL.

== Philanthropy and Advocacy ==
Since their debut, Hori7on has participated in various charitable initiatives, youth empowerment programs, and cultural diplomacy campaigns in the Philippines and across Asia.

=== Charity and community initiatives ===
In November 2024, Hori7on partnered with SM Supermalls and Toy Kingdom to promote the annual "SM Bears of Joy" holiday charity drive. Under the campaign's "Buy One, Donate One" model, shoppers may purchase a pair of plush bears keeping one while SM Cares donated the twin plushie to partner orphanages and child-caring institutions nationwide.

=== Civic engagement and youth empowerment ===
In May 2025, Hori7on joined the civilian-led Atin Ito Coalition for its third mission to the West Philippine Sea. Performing alongside regional artists aboard the M/V Kapitan Felix Oca near Pag-asa Island and El Nido, Palawan, the group participated in the "Concert at Sea for Peace" to promote peaceful dialogue and regional solidarity.

Hori7on has also supported youth-focused civic platforms, including performing twice at the SM Cares Global Youth Summit at the SM Mall of Asia Arena, an annual gathering aimed at mobilizing students and young leaders around social and environmental advocacy.

=== Cultural diplomacy ===
As the first Filipino boy band to train and debut in South Korea, Hori7on has served as a cultural bridge between the two countries. The group regularly collaborates with the Korean Cultural Center of the Philippines to promote bilateral cultural exchange. In April 2026, the National Commission for Culture and the Arts (NCCA) appointed Hori7on as one of the official Philippine Representatives to the 2026 ASEAN Round Festival, showcasing Filipino pop music on an international diplomatic stage.

== Members ==
- Vinci (빈치) – leader, vocalist
- Kim (킴) – vocalist, rapper, dancer
- Kyler (카일러) – vocalist
- Reyster (레이스터) – rapper, dancer
- Winston (윈스턴) – vocalist
- Jeromy (제로미) – dancer
- Marcus (마커스) – vocalist

== Discography ==
=== Studio albums ===
List of studio albums, showing selected details, selected chart positions and sales figures
Title	Details	Peak chart positions	Sales
Title	Details	KOR	Sales
Friend-Ship	Released: July 24, 2023; Label: MLD; Format: CD, digital download, streaming	7	KOR: 59,177

=== Single albums ===
List of single albums and showing selected details
Title	Details
Daytour	Released: March 2, 2024; Label: MLD; Format: Digital download, streaming
Daytour 2	Released: August 13, 2024; Label: MLD; Format: Digital download, streaming

=== Singles ===
List of singles, showing year released and name of the album
Title	Year	Album	Ref.
"Six7een"	2023	Friend-Ship	
"Birthday"	2023	Friend-Ship	
"Lucky"	2024	Daytour	
"Sumayaw Sumunod"	2024	Daytour 2	
"Cold"	2025	Non-album singles	
"Lunod"	2026	Non-album singles	
"Fly With It"	2026	Non-album singles	

=== Promotional singles ===
List of promotional singles, showing year released and name of the album
Title	Year	Album	Ref.
"Dash"	2023	Friend-Ship	
"Salamat"	2023	Friend-Ship	
"Lovey Dovey"	2023	Friend-Ship	
"Sulong" (with Kaia and 1st.One)	2026	Non-album single	

== Videography ==
=== Music videos ===
List of music videos, showing year released, and directors
Title	Year	Director(s)	Ref.
"Dash"	2023	Unknown	
"Salamat"	2023	Unknown	
"Lovey Dovey"	2023	Unknown	
"Six7een"	2023	Inyeon Entertainment	
"Birthday"	2023	Unknown	
"Lucky"	2024	Unknown	
"Sumayaw, Sumunod"	2024	Unknown	
"Sumayaw, Sumunod – Tagalog Version"	2024	Unknown	
"Cold"	2025	Unknown	
"Lunod"	2026	Unknown	

== Filmography ==
=== Television shows ===
Year	Title	Role	Notes	Ref.
2022–23	Dream Maker	Contestants	Group formed on Episode 26	
2023	100 Days Miracle	Themselves	Documentary Reality Show for Debut	
2024	Pack your Bag	Themselves	YouTube Series	

== Concerts and live performances ==
=== Concerts ===
Date	Title	City	Country	Venue	Ref.
September 9, 2023	Voyage To Manila	Quezon City	Philippines	Smart Araneta Coliseum	
November 3, 2024	Anchor High	Pasay	Philippines	SM Mall of Asia Arena	

== Awards and nominations ==
Name of the award ceremony, year presented, category, nominee of the award, and the result of the nomination
Award ceremony	Year	Category	Nominee / Work	Result	Ref.
Asia Artist Awards	2023	Popularity Award – Male Singer	Hori7on	Nominated	
Asia Artist Awards	2023	Focus Award – Music	Hori7on	Won	
Asia Artist Awards	2024	Popularity Award – Male Singer	Hori7on	Nominated	
Asia Artist Awards	2025	Popularity Award – Male Group	Hori7on	Nominated	
K-Star MVA	2023	Next Star – Men	Hori7on	Nominated	
Nylon Manila Big Bold Brave Awards	2024	Fearless Global Filipino	Hori7on	Won	
Forbes Korea 6th KPop Awards	2024	Popularity Award – Male Idols Who Shined in the First Half of 2024	Hori7on	Won	
Asia Star Entertainer Awards	2025	Best Group Male	Hori7on	Nominated	
Asia Star Entertainer Awards	2025	Best New Artist	Hori7on	Nominated	
Asia Star Entertainer Awards	2025	Fan Choice 5th Generation	Hori7on	Nominated	
Asia Star Entertainer Awards	2025	Fan Choice Artist Singer	Hori7on	Nominated	
Tag Awards Chicago	2024	P-Pop Stars of the Year	Hori7on	Won	
Tag Awards Chicago	2026	P-Pop Stars of the Year	Hori7on	Won	
8th PPOP Awards	2023	Top Global Artist of the Year	Hori7on	Won	
8th PPOP Awards	2023	Philippine New Boy Group	Hori7on	Nominated	
8th PPOP Awards	2023	Ppop Song of the Year	"Salamat"	Nominated	
Wish Music Awards	2024	Wish Pop Song of the Year	"Six7een"	Nominated	
K-Star Chart Awards	2024	Best Rookie Song	"Sumayaw Sumunod"	Nominated	
16th PMPC Star Awards for Music	2024	New Male Group Artist of the Year	''Dash"	Nominated	
Channel R Radio	2024	Song of the Summer	"Lucky"	Nominated	
Dream Rookie Concert	2024	Dream Rookie Award	Hori7on	Nominated	
Dream Rookie Concert	2024	Super Rookie Award	Hori7on	Nominated	
Dabeme Music Awards	2025	Group/Band of the Year	Hori7on	Won	
VP Choice Awards	2024	KPop Act of the Year	Hori7on	Won	
VP Choice Awards	2025	KPop Act of the Year	Hori7on	Won	
VP Choice Awards	2026	KPop Act of the Year	Hori7on	Won	
9th PPOP Music Awards	2024	Rising Boy Group of the Year	Hori7on	Won	
9th PPOP Music Awards	2024	Concert of the Year	Daytour: Anchor High	Nominated	
9th PPOP Music Awards	2024	Fandom of the Year	Anchors	Nominated	
Push Awards 2023	2023	P-pop Group of 2023	Hori7on	Nominated	
BreakTudo Awards	2025	Music by New International Artist	"Cold"	Won	
10th PPOP Music Awards	2025	Breakthrough Artist of the Year	Hori7on	Nominated	
10th PPOP Music Awards	2025	Youth Leader Award	Hori7on	Won	
10th PPOP Music Awards	2025	Favorite PPop Group of the Year	Hori7on	Nominated	
10th PPOP Music Awards	2025	PPop Fandom of the Year	Anchors	Nominated	
10th PPOP Music Awards	2025	Favorite Leader of the Year	Vinci	Nominated	
10th PPOP Music Awards	2025	Favorite Vocalist of the Year	Vinci	Nominated	
10th PPOP Music Awards	2025	Favorite Fashion Icon of the Year	Kim	Nominated	
10th PPOP Music Awards	2025	Favorite Visual of the Year	Kyler	Nominated	
10th PPOP Music Awards	2025	Favorite Rapper of the Year	Reyster	Nominated	
10th PPOP Music Awards	2025	Favorite Dancer of the Year	Jeromy	Nominated	
Global Fans Choice Awards	2025-2026	Global Rising Star of Asia	Hori7on	Pending	
Kstyle Awards 2025	2025	Global Rising Star	Hori7on	Pending	
Kstyle Awards 2025	2026	Global Rising Star	Hori7on	Pending	
2025 Metro Manila Film Festival	2025	Best Original Theme Song	"Pahinga"	Nominated	
1st YourLOOP Awards	2025	P-pop Group of the Year	Hori7on	Nominated	
1st YourLOOP Awards	2025	P-pop Fandom of the Year	Anchors	Nominated	
1st YourLOOP Awards	2025	P-pop Emerging Idol of the Year	Marcus	Won	
1st YourLOOP Awards	2025	P-pop Crossover Idol of the Year	Vinci	Won	
Jupiter Music Awards	2026	Male Group of the Year	Hori7on	Nominated	
35th Seoul Music Awards	2026	Popularity Award	Hori7on	Nominated	
35th Seoul Music Awards	2026	K-Pop World Choice (Group)	Hori7on	Nominated	

=== Honors/listicles ===
Name of country, organization, year given, and name of honor
Country or Organization	Year	Honor or Award	Ref.
Korea Hallyu Awards	2023	Popular Culture Award – Overseas Rising Star	
TC Candler	2023	100 Most Handsome Faces (#27 Kyler, #58 Reyster)	
TC Candler	2024	100 Most Handsome Faces (#21 Kyler)	
TC Candler	2025	100 Most Handsome Faces (#30 Kyler)	
SunStar	2023	Top OPM Albums of 2023 (#14 Friend-Ship)	
Daily Tribune	2024	8 Pinoy Groups That Have Redefined The Music Industry (#4 Hori7on)	
Tatler Asia	2026	10 SEAPop Groups Worth Listening To (#3 Hori7on)	
VP Choice Awards	2026	Hall of Fame Inductee for 3 Consecutive Wins in K-Pop Act of the Year	
Billboard Philippines	2026	Billboard Philippines P-Pop Class of 2026	
VMAN Southeast Asia	2026	The Next-Gen P-Pop Groups Redefining the Scene	
