= Lovey Dovey (Hori7on song) =

- Digital cover

Promotional single by Hori7on

from the album Friend-Ship
- Released: May 31, 2023
- Studio: MLD Studio
- Genre: Pop
- Length: 3:09
- Label: MLD
- Songwriters: Bull$eye; How; Yuka; Meang Co

Music video
- "Lovey Dovey" on YouTube

"Lovey Dovey" is a song by the Filipino boy band Hori7on. It was released on May 31, 2023, by MLD Entertainment and distributed by YG Plus, as one of the group's pre-debut digital singles.

== Background and release ==
"Lovey Dovey" was written by composer Bull$eye for the contestants of Dream Maker to perform on their third mission, held in late January 2023. Assigned to the team named "Six of Hearts", which included eventual member Marcus Cabais, the song's performance was described as a stand-out by Rafael Bautista of Nylon Manila. The song would become a part of Hori7on's setlist during their promotional mall tours, as well as on their first fan meet.

On May 23, 2023, it was announced that the song would be released as the group's third pre-debut digital single, and the first since their arrival on South Korea. Before the single's release, concept art depicting the members in bright-colored sets were released to promote the single. The single was released on May 31, 2023, with an accompanying music video, cycling through different vibrant sets.

The song, along with the two other pre-debut singles released by the group, was later included in the group's debut album, Friend-Ship.

== Composition ==
The song is composed in the key of C-sharp major and carries an average tempo of 110 beats per minute. The song, which been described as "lively", is about a youthful romance

== Credits and personnel ==
Credits derived from Melon:

Studio

- MLD Studio – recording
- Dart Studio – mixing and mastering

Personnel

- Hori7on – vocals
- How (Kor) – lyrics, composition
- Bull$eye (Avec) – lyrics, composition, arrangement, recording
- Yuka (Avec) – lyrics, composition, recording
- Meang Co – lyrics, composition
- Kim Ga-young – synthesizer, drum and programming
- Yoon Young-bok – chorus
- Kim Soo-bin – chorus
- Hyun Woo-bin – digital editing
- Team AMG – mixing and mastering

== Track listing ==
- Digital
1. "Lovey Dovey" – 3:09
2. "Lovey Dovey" (instrumental) – 3:09

== Release history ==
Release dates and formats for "Lovey Dovey"
Region	Date	Format	Label	Ref.
Various	May 31, 2023	Digital download; streaming	MLD	
