= Team Yey! =

Philippine children's television show

- Title card since 2016
- Genre: Children's television series Variety show
- Created by: ABS-CBN Studios; Benedict Manlapaz
- Directed by: Mark Reyes
- Starring: See cast
- Opening theme: "Team Yey!" theme song by the Team Yey! cast
- Ending theme: "Team Yey!" theme song (instrumental)
- Country of origin: Philippines
- Original language: Filipino
- No. of seasons: 5
- No. of episodes: 350

Production
- Production locations: Manila, Philippines
- Camera setup: Multiple-camera setup
- Running time: 30 minutes
- Production company: ABS-CBN Digital Terrestrial Television

Original release
- Network: YeY Channel; ABS-CBN
- Release: June 19, 2016 – June 30, 2020
- Network: Kapamilya Channel
- Release: September 12 – November 21, 2020

Team Yey! (stylized as Team YeY!) is a Philippine children's television show created by YeY Channel, a defunct digital free-to-air channel of ABS-CBN TVplus. The show premiered on June 19, 2016, and was aired every Mondays to Sundays from 8:30 AM to 9:00 AM, with replays from 3:30 PM to 4:00 PM (originally on Yey!; now changed to Saturday mornings at 6:15 AM to 6:45 AM on Kapamilya Channel and 8:30 AM to 9:00 AM on A2Z). For over eight seasons, Team Yey! was the first local children's program produced and aired on a digital-television-exclusive channel. On June 30, 2020, the show stopped airing after Yey! channel ceased its free-to-air broadcast operations as ordered by the National Telecommunications Commission (NTC) due to the expiration of ABS-CBN's legislative franchise.

The show has since moved to Kapamilya Channel. The show reruns from past seasons aired on free TV via A2Z every Saturdays.

On June 24, 2023, the show was resumed and reformatted as a 5-minute children's show with a new title Team Yey Shorts (formerly Team Yey Vlogs). It is hosted by the remaining original cast member Justin James "JJ" Quilantang and its new members Althea Ruedas, Gabrielle Nagayama, Imogen Rae Cantong and among others.

== Cast ==
Current hosts

- Justin James "JJ" Quilantang (since 2020)
- Althea Ruedas (since 2023)
- Trish Gabby Nagayama (since 2023)
- Imogen Rae Cantong (since 2023)
- Isha Adviento (since 2023)
- Prince Dave Bagona (since 2023)
- Cloud Ramos (since 2023)
- JT Manalo (since 2023)

Former hosts

- Sophia Reola (2016–2020; still with Star Magic)
- Yesha Camile (2017–2020)
- Althea Guanzon (2016–2022)
- Elisia Parmisano (2019–2020; now a member of K-Pop girl group UNIS)
- Lei Andrei Navarro (2017–2020)
- Zyren dela Cruz (2018–2020)
- Lady Pipay Navarro (2018–2020)
- Erika Clemente (2018–2020)
- Xia Vigor (2019–2020)
- Marco Masa (2019–2020)
- Kaycee David (2019–2022)
- Robbie Wachtel (2020–2022)
- Chunsa Jung (2020–2022; still with Star Magic)
- Prince Encelan (2020–2022)
- Katelynne Ramos (2020–2022)
- JM Canlas† (2017–2019)
- AJ Urquia (2016–2017)
- Sam Shoaf (2016–2017)
- Raven Cajuguiran (2016–2017)
- Luke Alford (2016–2017)
- Noel Comia Jr. (2017–2018)
- Mitch Naco (2016–2018)
- Lukas Magallano (2018–2020)
- Marcus Cabais (2018–2020; now a member of K-Pop boy group Hori7on)
- Reese Tutanes (2018–2020)
- Sofia Millares (2016–2017)
- Orange Bilgera (2018–2019)
- Hannah Lopez Vito (2016–2019; still with Star Magic)
- Jana Agoncillo (2017–2019; still with Star Magic)
- Santino Santiago (2018–2020)
- Omar Uddin (2019–2020)
- Nhikzy Calma (2018–2020)

== Segments ==
- Galaw Go! (airs every Mondays)
- Snaks Naman (airs every Tuesdays)
- Artstig (airs every Wednesdays)
- Game Play (airs every Thursdays)
- StorYey (airs every Fridays)
- Sound Check (airs every Saturdays)
- Sunday Funday (airs every Sundays)
