= Kpopmap =

South Korean content publisher

- Website type: Entertainment
- Headquarters: Seoul, {{{location_country}}}
- Country of origin: South Korea
- Website: kpopmap.com
- Current status: Active

Kpopmap is a South Korea-based cultural platform that connects global fans with Korean content through articles, promotions, artist merchandise, and award show broadcasts.

== Overview ==
Kpopmap offers news, features, interviews, charts, quizzes, events, virtual vote casting, competition tracking and fan-driven content across topics like idols, K-dramas, films, travel, food, fashion, beauty, webtoons, and Korean trends. But not only it engages in various content-driven businesses, including global promotions in collaboration with Korean entertainment agencies, artist merchandise distribution, and international broadcasting of K-pop award shows.

Available in multiple languages, including English, Spanish, Chinese, Japanese, and French, Kpopmap is headquartered in Seoul and Jeju. Its international team uses technology and interactive tools to engage fans and personalize content, aiming to connect global audiences with Korean entertainment and culture.

Their work has been used by publishers in Indonesia, Malaysia, Vietnam, and South Korea.

Additionally, they are also known for holding event such as Alohao.
