= Lapillus (group) =

South Korean girl group

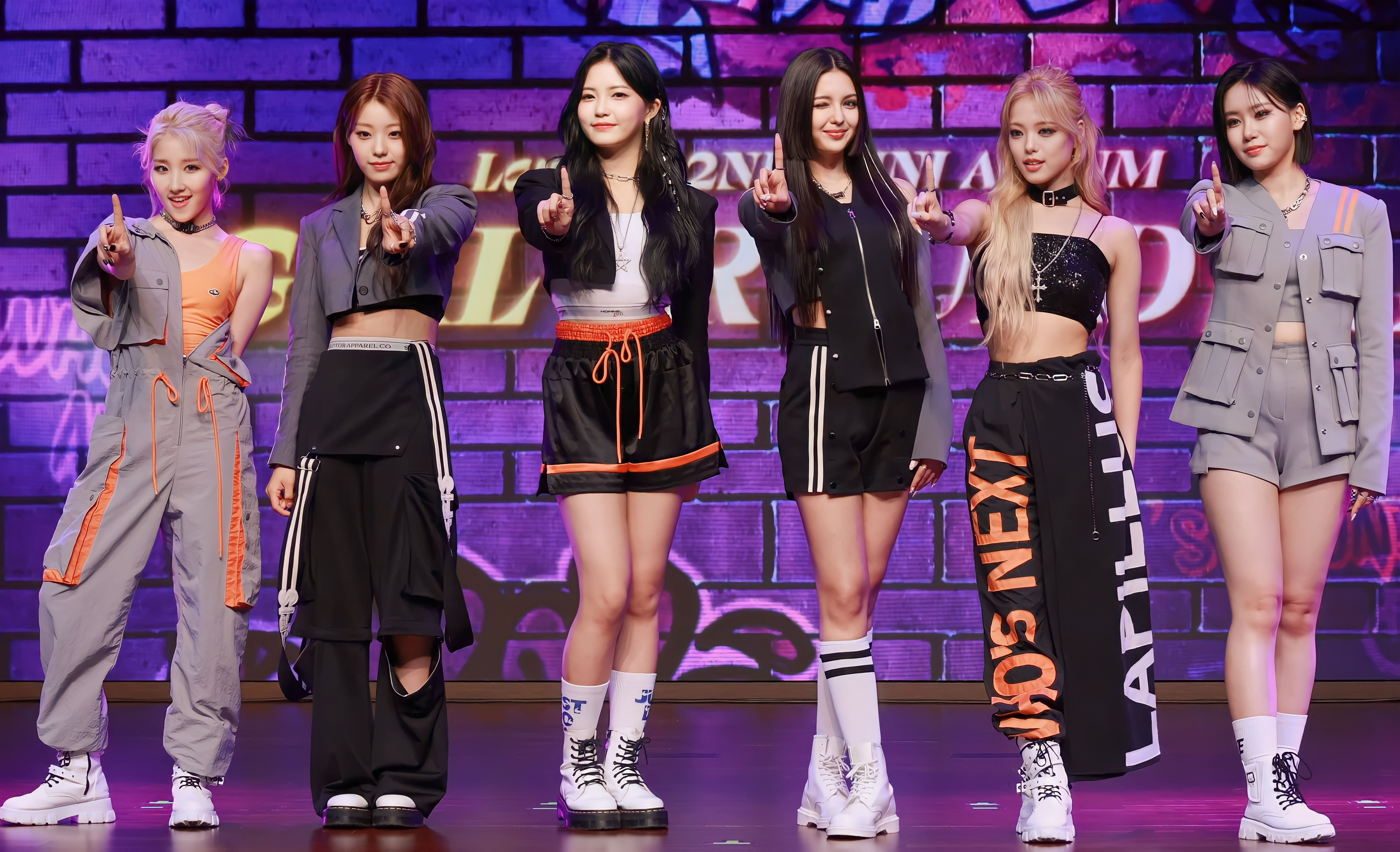
- Lapillus in June 2023; From L–R: Shana (former member), Haeun, Seowon, Chanty, Yue, and Bessie

Background information
- Origin: Seoul, South Korea
- Genre: K-pop
- Years active: 2022–2025
- Labels: MLD; LOG-IN
- Members: Chanty; Yue; Bessie; Seowon; Haeun
- Past members: Shana

Lapillus (/ləˈpɪləs/; Korean: 라필루스; stylized in all caps) was a South Korean girl group formed and managed by MLD Entertainment. The group is composed of five members: Chanty, Yue, Bessie, Seowon, and Haeun. Lapillus was originally a six-member group; Shana left the group on October 26, 2025. They debuted on June 20, 2022, with the release of their digital single album Hit Ya!.

== Name ==
In an exclusive press conference with the Philippine media networks ABS-CBN and CNN Philippines, leader Shana explained that their group name is derived from a Latin word. "[It means] a special stone or like a jewel that shines different colors depending on the direction of the light", she said.

== History ==
=== Pre-debut activities ===
Shana was a J-Group contestant on Girls Planet 999. She placed 16th overall in the show. Chanty is a former actress who was under Star Magic in the Philippines and previously appeared on dramas such as Hiwaga ng Kambat, I Got You, and Starla. Together with Shana, Chanty hosted a YouTube series called ChanSha World from December 2021 to August 2022, which featured the pair playing games and completing challenges, allowing fans to discover more about them ahead of their debut.

=== 2022–present: Introduction, debut with Hit Ya!, Girl's Round Part.1, Girl's Round Part.2, and Japanese debut ===
On May 16, 2022, MLD Entertainment announced that they would be debuting a new girl group for the first time since their last launch Momoland in 2016. The members were revealed in pairs from May 23 to 25, starting with Shana and Haeun, then Seowon and Yue, and finally Bessie and Chanty. Promotions for the group's debut began on June 13, 2022 with the announcement of the album name and following up with teaser images, videos, and advertisements. The first girl group to debut under MLD Entertainment in six years, Lapillus released their debut digital single album, Hit Ya!, on June 20, 2022, consisting of the title track of the same name and the instrumental. Lapillus' first music show performance aired on June 23, 2022, on Mnet's M Countdown.

On August 31, 2022, it was announced that Lapillus would release their first extended play titled Girl's Round Part.1 and its double lead singles "Gratata" and "Burn with Love" on September 22, 2022. The EP also featured their debut single, Hit Ya!.

On December 8, 2022, MLD Entertainment announced that Bessie had temporarily suspended activities for health reasons.

On January 19, 2023, MLD Entertainment announced that Chanty had temporarily suspended activities for health reasons.

On June 7, the group dropped a coming soon teaser for their second extended play and on June 21 their second EP Girl's Round Part. 2 with the lead single "Who's Next" released on June 21.

On June 10, the group announced their plans to make their Japanese debut with their first single, Who's Next (Japanese Ver.) which was released on August 2.

On April 5, 2024, MLD Entertainment announced that Chanty will be taking an indefinite hiatus due to being diagnosed with chronic fatigue syndrome. The company assured that she would still remain a member of the group and continue to perform individual activities, but will not participate in group activities during her recovery. She returned to the group in November during their Japan concerts.

On October 26, 2025, Shana announced on her social media that she had terminated her contract with MLD Entertainment and departed from Lapillus.

== Members ==
- Chanty (샨티) - vocalist
- Yue (유에) - vocalist, dancer
- Bessie (베시)- vocalist, rapper
- Seowon (서원)- rapper
- Haeun (하은)- dancer, vocalist, rapper

=== Former ===
- Shana (샤나) – leader, vocalist

== Discography ==
=== Extended plays ===
List of extended plays, showing selected details, selected chart positions, and sales figures
Title	Details	Peak chart positions	Sales
Title	Details	KOR	Sales
Girl's Round Part.1	Released: September 22, 2022; Label: MLD Entertainment; Formats: Digital download, streaming, SMC; Track listing: 1. "Gratata"; 2. "Burn with Love"; 3. "Queendom"; 4. "Hit Ya!"; 5. "Gratata" (instrumental)	71	KOR: 1,730
Girl's Round Part.2	Released: June 21, 2023; Label: MLD Entertainment; Formats: CD, digital download, streaming; Track listing: 1. "Who's Next"; 2. "Marionette"; 3. "Ulala"; 4. "Paper"; 5. "Who's Next (Eng ver.)" 6. "Who's Next (Inst.)"	63	KOR: 1,864
"—" denotes a recording that did not chart or was not released in that territory

=== Singles ===
List of singles, showing year released, selected chart positions, and name of the album
Title	Year	Peak chart positions		Album
Title	Year	KOR DL	JPN	Album
"Hit Ya!"	2022	121	—	Non-album single
"Gratata"	2022	100	—	Girl's Round Part.1
"Burn with Love"	2022	180	—	Girl's Round Part.1
"Who's Next"	2023	130	31	Girl's Round Part.2
"—" denotes a recording that did not chart or was not released in that territory

== Videography ==
=== Music videos ===
Title	Year	Director(s)	Ref.
"Hit Ya!"	2022	Sunny Visual	
"Gratata"	2022	Sunny Visual	

== Awards and nominations ==
Name of the award ceremony, year presented, category, nominee(s) of the award, and the result of the nomination
Award Ceremony	Year	Category	Nominee(s)	Result	Ref.
Asia Artist Awards	2022	Female Idol Popularity Award	Lapillus	Nominated	
Asia Artist Awards	2022	Focus Award – Music	Lapillus	Won	
Asia Artist Awards	2023	Popularity Award – Singer (Female)	Lapillus	Nominated	
Asia Artist Awards	2024	Popularity Award – Singer (Female)	Lapillus	Nominated	
Nickelodeon Mexico Kids' Choice Awards	2023	Favorite K-Pop Group	Lapillus	Nominated	
Seoul Music Awards	2023	New Wave Star Award	Lapillus	Won	
Seoul Music Awards	2023	K-wave Popularity Award	Lapillus	Nominated	

== Ambassadorship ==
- Ambassador of the Province of Ilocos Sur in the Philippines (2022)
