= TFN (group) =

2021–24 South Korean–Japanese boy band

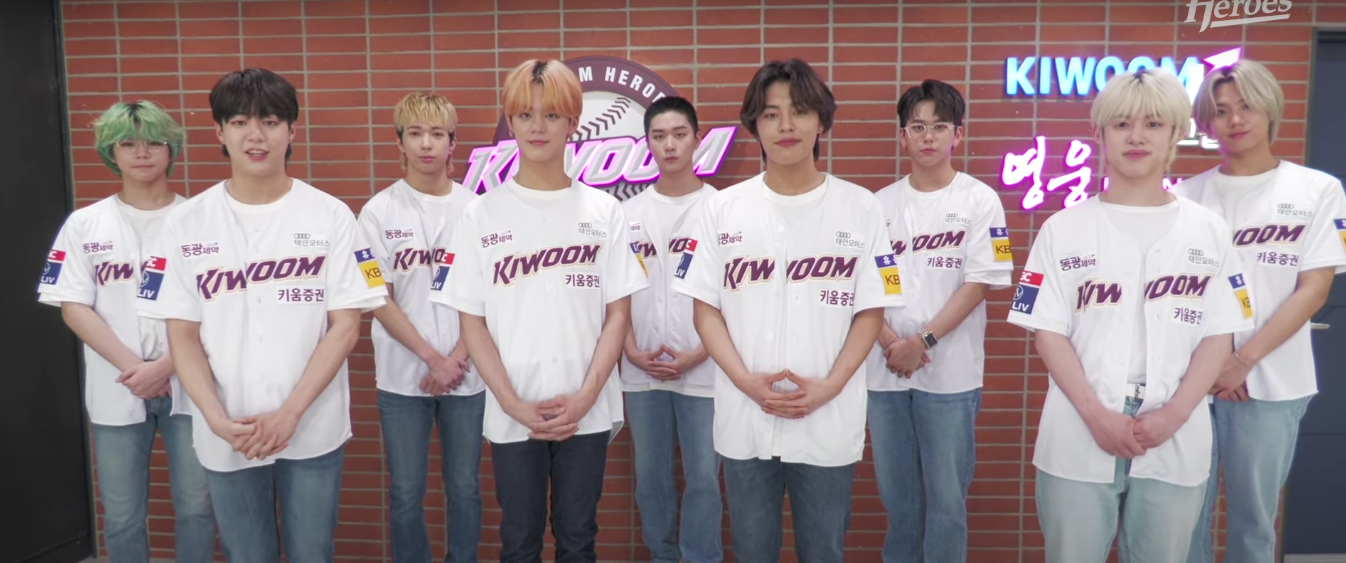
- TFN in May 2021

Background information
- Also known as: T1419 (2021–2022)
- Origin: Seoul, South Korea
- Genres: K-pop; hip hop music
- Years active: 2021–2024
- Labels: MLD/Sony Korea; Sony Japan; ICM Partners
- Past members: Noa; Sian; Kevin; Gunwoo; Leo; On; Zero; Kairi; Kio
- Website: www.mldenter.com/t1419

TFN (Korean: 티에프엔), formerly known as T1419 (Korean: 티일사일구), was a South Korean–Japanese boy band formed in 2021 under MLD Entertainment. The group consisted of nine members: Noa, Sian, Kevin, Gunwoo, Leo, On, Zero, Kairi, and Kio. They debuted on January 11, 2021, with the single album Before Sunrise Part. 1.

== History ==
=== 2020–2021: Debut with Before Sunrise series ===
On October 13, 2020, MLD Entertainment announced they would be launching a new boy group in December in partnership with NHN Entertainment Corporation and Sony Music. The group would debut not only in Korea but also in Japan and the United States, simultaneously. It was later announced that MLD had signed a business partner agreement with ICM Partners for activities in the U.S. The following day, a pre-teaser photo was released featuring all the members. On October 17, a schedule was released for the non-promoted pre-debut release, the group was said to be releasing a music video for "Dracula" on October 27.

On January 11, 2021, they debuted with their first single album, Before Sunrise Part. 1, and its lead single "Asurabalbalta".

On March 31, 2021, T1419 returned with their second single album, Before Sunrise Part. 2, and its lead single "Exit".

On August 23, 2021, T1419 released their third single album, Before Sunrise Part. 3, and its lead single "Flex".

On December 2, 2021, T1419 released the digital single, "Red Light, Green Light".

=== 2022–2024: Japanese debut, first Spanish single, rebranding as TFN, and disbandment ===
On March 9, 2022, T1419 made their Japanese debut with the extended play, Our Teen: Blue Side, and its lead single "Run Up". The Korean version of the lead single was released on May 9, 2022.

On March 22, 2022, T1419 released the digital single, "Edelweiss".

On July 3, 2022, T1419 released their first Spanish single, "When The Sun Goes Down".

In August 2022, T1419 joined the Weverse platform.

On October 17, 2022, MLD Entertainment announced that the group's name would be renamed as TFN.

On November 15, 2022, TFN made a guest appearance on the Filipino variety show It's Showtime as they performed their single, "Amazon".

On February 29, 2024, MLD Entertainment announced TFN's disbandment.

== Past members ==
Adapted from their Naver profile and website profile.

- Noa (노아)
- Sian (시안)
- Kevin (케빈)
- Gunwoo (건우)
- Leo (레오)
- On (온)
- Zero (제로)
- Kairi (카이리)
- Kio (키오)

== Discography ==
=== Extended plays ===
Title	Album details	Peak chart positions	Sales
Title	Album details	JPN	Sales
T1419
Our Teen: Blue Side	Released: March 9, 2022 (JPN); Label: Sony Music; Formats: CD, digital download; Track listing: 1. "Run Up"; 2. "Daydreamer"; 3. "Home"; 4. "Asurabalbalta" (Japanese ver.); 5. "Exit" (Japanese ver.); 6. "Flex" (Japanese ver.); 7. "Red Light, Green Light" (Japanese ver.)	32	JPN: 1,363
TFN
Before Sunrise Part. 4	Released: October 26, 2022 (KOR); Label: Sony Music; Formats: CD, digital download; Track listing: 1. "Amazon"; 2. "Deep Dive"; 3. "Bloom"; 4. "Slate"; 5. "Amazon" (instrumental)	—	—

=== Single albums ===
Title	Album details	Peak chart positions	Sales
Title	Album details	KOR	Sales
T1419
Before Sunrise Part. 1	Released: January 11, 2021; Label: MLD Entertainment, Sony Music; Formats: CD, digital download; Track listing: 1. "Asurabalbalta" (아수라발발타); 2. "Butt Out"; 3. "Asurabalbalta" (아수라발발타) (Inst.)	8	KOR: 16,922
Before Sunrise Part. 2	Released: March 31, 2021; Label: MLD Entertainment, Sony Music; Formats: CD, digital download; Track listing: 1. "Exit"; 2. "Dracula"; 3. "Exit" (Inst.)	7	KOR: 26,496
Before Sunrise Part. 3	Released: August 23, 2021; Label: MLD Entertainment, Sony Music; Formats: CD, digital download; Track listing: 1. "Flex"; 2. "Get the Bomb"; 3. "Flex" (Inst.)	11	KOR: 23,833
"—" denotes releases that did not chart or were not released in that region.

=== Singles ===
Title	Year	Peak position	Album
Title	Year	KOR	Album
T1419
"Dracula"	2020	—	Before Sunrise Part. 2
"Asurabalbalta" (아수라발발타)	2021	—	Before Sunrise Part. 1
"Exit"	2021	—	Before Sunrise Part. 2
"Flex"	2021	—	Before Sunrise Part. 3
"Red Light, Green Light" (무궁화 꽃이 피었습니다)	2021	—	Non-album singles
"Edelweiss"	2022	—	Non-album singles
"Run Up" (Japanese, Korean)	2022	—	Non-album singles
"When The Sun Goes Down" (Spanish)	2022	—	Non-album singles
TFN
"Amazon"	2022	—	Before Sunrise Part. 4
"Mirage" (Japanese)	2023	—	Non-album singles
"Ice Cream" (Spanish)	2023	—	Non-album singles
"—" denotes releases that did not chart or were not released in that region.

== Filmography ==
=== Reality shows ===
Year	Title	Network	Note(s)	Ref.
2020	Daily Us	YouTube	Debut reality show	

== Awards and nominations ==
Name of the award ceremony, year presented, award category, nominee(s) of the award, and the result of the nomination
Award ceremony	Year	Category	Nominee(s)	Result	Ref.
Asia Artist Awards	2021	Male Idol Group Popularity Award	T1419	Nominated	
Asia Artist Awards	2021	Potential Singer Award	T1419	Won	
Asia Artist Awards	2022	Potential Award – Singer	T1419	Won	
Seoul Music Awards	2022	Rookie of the Year	T1419	Nominated	
Seoul Music Awards	2022	Popularity Award	T1419	Nominated	
Seoul Music Awards	2022	K-wave Popularity Award	T1419	Nominated	
