= MLD Entertainment =

South Korean entertainment agency

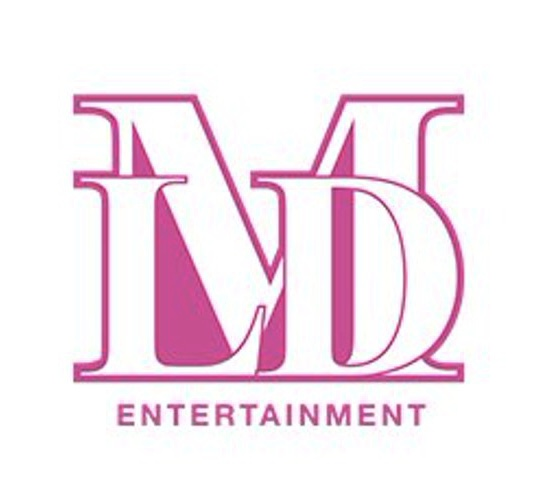
- Native name: MLD 엔터테인먼트
- Type: Private
- Industry: Music
- Genre: K-pop, P-pop
- Founded: 2015
- Founder: Duble Sidekick
- Headquarters: South Korea
- Key people: Lee Hyung-jin
- Website: www.mldenter.com

MLD Entertainment (formerly known as Duble Kick Entertainment; Korean: MLD 엔터테인먼트) is a South Korean entertainment agency and record label founded in 2015 by Duble Sidekick. The agency currently manages the girl group Lapillus. Previously managed artists include girl group Momoland, boy bands Hori7on, TFN and rapper Cheetah.

== History ==
=== 2015–18: Formation and Momoland ===
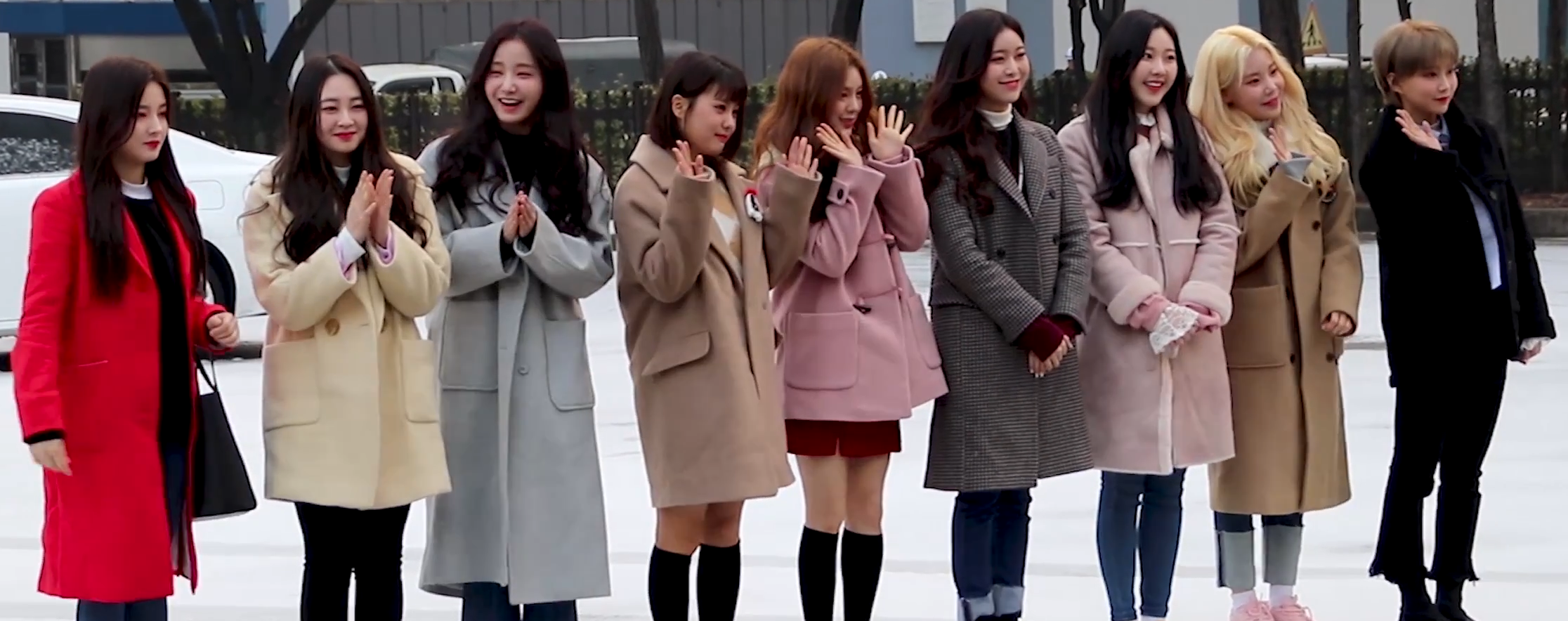
Momoland at KBS Music Bank in February 2018.

Duble Kick Entertainment was founded in 2015 by the music-producing duo, Duble Sidekick. In 2016, the company aired a survival program on Mnet titled Finding Momoland, in which seven trainees were selected to form the lineup of Momoland. The group attracted attention internationally with their crowd-funded project to fund their debut release. Their debut extended play, Welcome To Momoland, was released on November 10, 2016.

=== 2018–21: Joint ventures and rebranding ===
The company rebranded itself as MLD Entertainment on January 16, 2018. On May 31, 2018, MLD Entertainment announced that they acquired BM Entertainment, R&D Company, and Double HTNE, as subsidiaries.

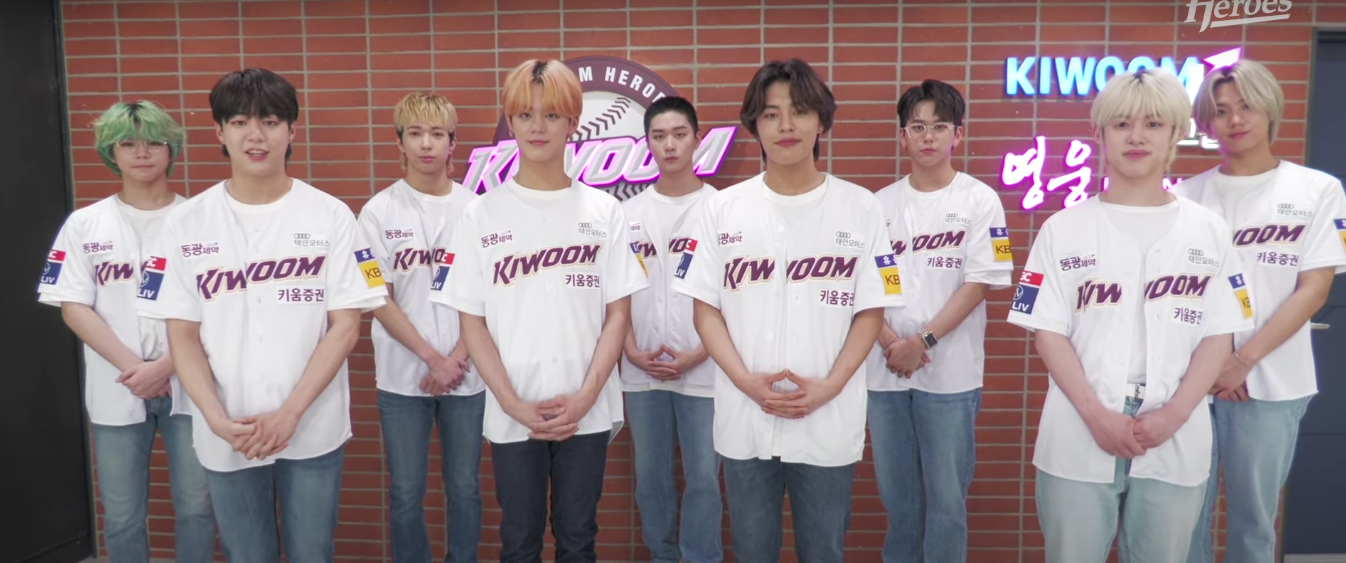
TFN in May 2021.

On October 13, 2020, MLD Entertainment announced that they had signed a deal with NHN Entertainment Corporation and Sony Music to simultaneously debut a boy band in the United States, Japan, and South Korea. The group, T1419, later renamed to TFN, debuted on January 11, 2021, with the release of their EP, Before Sunrise Part.1. On October 14, 2021, R&B duo JT&Marcus released their debut album, Dear You, under the agency.

=== 2022–24: Departure of Momoland and disbandment of TFN ===
The company partnered with ABS-CBN and Kamp Global on September 7, 2022, to form and manage a Filipino boy band in South Korea. The members of the band was determined through the survival program Dream Maker, in which seven contestants were selected to form the lineup of Hori7on. The group debuted July 24, 2023, with the release of their album Friend-Ship.

On January 6, 2022, CocaNButter, a quartet known for their appearances on Street Woman Fighter and Street Dance Girls Fighter, signed an exclusive contract with the agency. On April 14, 2022, Lee Seung-chul signed an exclusive contract with the agency.

On May 16, 2022, the agency announced that it formed a new girl group, Lapillus, for the first time since the debut of Momoland six years prior. Lapillus debuted on with the release of the extended play Girl's Round Part.1, supported by its lead singles "Gratata" and "Burn with Love", on September 22, 2022.

On January 27, 2023, MLD Entertainment issued a press release announcing that the remaining six members of Momoland did not renew their contracts with the company. Rapper Cheetah signed an exclusive contract with the company on April 6, 2023. On February 29, 2024, media outlets reported that TFN had disbanded.

=== 2024–present: Financial crisis and multiple departures ===
On June 18, 2024, it was revealed that MLD Entertainment had abandoned Lapillus' trademark, allegedly due to unpaid registration fees. On July 17, 2024, it was reported that MLD Entertainment is currently in a financial crisis, as the company had been unable to pay their employees' wages. As a result, most of the employees resigned, leaving five people remaining with the company. CEO Lee Hyung-Jin is currently staying in the Philippines to focus on Hori7on's activities.

On November 10, 2024, Jaejun from JT&Marcus announced on an Instagram livestream that the duo had left MLD Entertainment. On May 26, 2025, CocaNButter announced via Instagram story that their exclusive contract with MLD Entertainment had ended.

In August 2026, P-pop boy group New Id ended their contract with MLD Entertainment, as did Hori7on.

== Artists ==
- Lapillus (since 2022)

== Former artists ==
- Momoland (2016–23)
  - Yeonwoo (2016–19)
  - Taeha (2017-19)
  - Daisy (2017–19)
  - Hyebin (2016–23)
  - Jane (2016–23)
  - Nayun (2016–23)
  - JooE (2016–23)
  - Ahin (2016–23)
  - Nancy (2016–23)
- TFN (2021–24)
- Narin (2022–25)
- Cheetah (2023–24)
- JT&Marcus (2021–24)
- CocaNButter (2022–25)
- Lapillus
  - Shana (2022–25)
- New:ID (2024–26)
- Hori7on (2023–26)
