= P-pop Music Awards 2025 =

2025 awards ceremony for music

- Previous: P-pop Music Awards 2024; 2024
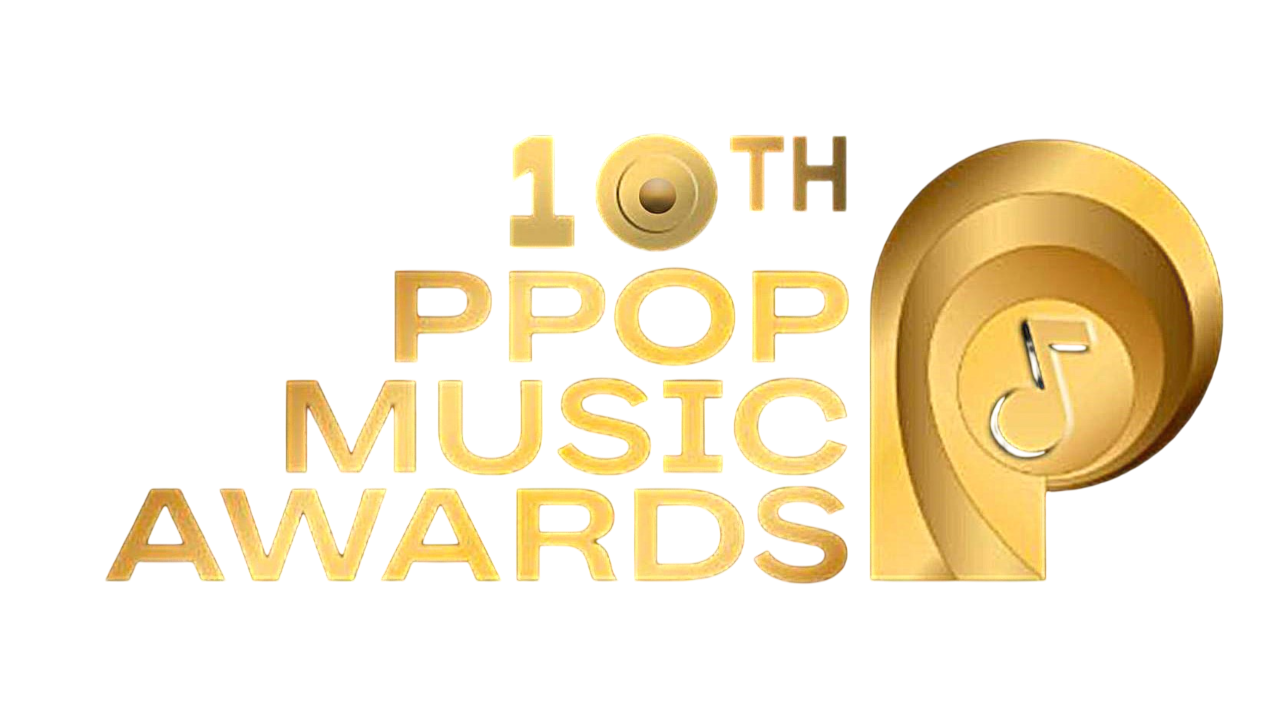
- Date: November 29, 2025
- Venue: Manila Metropolitan Theater; Ermita, Manila
- Country: Philippines
- Presented by: JuanCast; Nudge+; Ppop Artist League; Ppop Music and Culture Caravan; Ppop Stage; Sidus Production
- Acts: 6ense; Anna; Azter; Calista; Cloud 7; Div9; Everchild; Gem&i; Hori7on; MNL48; Neo; One South; Pixie; Rey Cariaso; SY·NC; Vlst; Vvink; YGIG
- Most wins: SB19 (6)
- Most nominations: SB19 (5)
- Total: 33

The 10th P-pop Music Awards ceremony, presented by the JuanCast, Nudge+, Ppop Artist League, Ppop Music and Culture Caravan, Ppop Stage, and Sidus Production, took place on November 29, 2025, at the Manila Metropolitan Theater in Ermita, Manila.

The P-pop Music Awards 2025 marked the 10th anniversary of the event. Established in 2016, the awards also referred to as the Philippine Popular Music Awards were created to recognize contributions to Philippine pop music.

== Winners and nominations ==
Lists of nominees are adapted from Philippine Daily Inquirer. Winners are listed first, highlighted in boldface, and indicated with a double dagger (‡).

**Artist of the Year**: **SB19 ‡**; Bini; Maki; Cup of Joe; TJ Monterde; Dionela	**Song of the Year**: **"Dungka!" — SB19 ‡**; "Dam" – SB19; "Blink Twice" — Bini; "Marilag" — Dionela
**Album of the Year**: **"Simula at Wakas" — SB19 ‡**; "Biniverse" — Bini; "Headlines" — BGYO; "Tawid" — The Juans; "Sarili Nating Mundo" — TJ Monterde; "Kolorcoaster" — Maki	**Music Video of the Year**: **"Dam" — SB19 ‡**; "Blink Twice" — Bini; "Tanga" — Kaia; "Alas Dose" by Calista; "Pa-Pa-Pa-Palaban" — G22
**Breaktrough Artist of the Year**: **India Music Festival — Kaia for ASEAN ‡**; Thailand Music Festival — BGYO; KBS World TV — Hori7on; ASEAN-Korea Round Festival — 1st.One	**Collaboration of the Year**: **"Umaaligid — Sarah Geronimo and SB19 ‡**; "Sampung Mga Daliri" — Dwta and Justin; "Kasama Ka" — Hazel Faith and X8; "Ating Pasko" — SB19 and G22; "Kabataang Pinoy" — BGYO and Cloud 7

**New Group Artist of the Year**: **Vvink ‡**; Neo; Raya; Sy·nc; OneVerse	**Solo Artist of the Year**: **Felip ‡**; Earl Agustin; James Reid; Rob Deniel; Hazel Faith; Gigi de Lana

**Rising Girl Group of the Year**: **G22 ‡**; MNL48; Calista; 4th Impact; YGIG; SMS	**Rising Boy Group of the Year**: **1st.One ‡**; Vxon; Cloud 7; AJAA; Azter; 6ense

=== Rising Group of the Year ===
- Vvink
- Wrive

=== Concert of the Year ===
- Simula at Wakas Kick-Off Concert by SB19

=== Choreography in a Live Performance ===
- "Dungka!" — SB19

=== Vocal Arrangement in Song Recording ===
- "I Bet You Never" — 4th Impact

=== Production Design in a Music Video ===
- "Blink Twice" by Bini
  - Production by YouMeUsMNL
- "Alas Dose" by Calista
  - Production by Chapters PH

=== Favorite Streamed Artist ===
- Bini
- Cup of Joe

=== Regional Song of the Year ===
- "Barugi" — VLST

=== Cultural Excellence Award ===
- One South

=== Ppop Female Star of the Night ===
- Pixie

=== Ppop Male Star of the Night ===
- New:ID

=== Youth Leader Award ===
- Hori7on

=== Ppop Spotlight Award ===
- MNL48
- Cloud 7
- SY·NC

=== Ppop Potential Award ===
- YGIG
- 6ense
- Neo

=== Ppop Frontier Award ===
- Pop Girls

=== Ppop Icon Award ===
- Sarah Geronimo

=== Ppop Artist of the Decade ===
- Hazel Faith
- Myrus Martinez
- Freshmen
- Fab4z

=== Fans Choice's Special Awards ===
- Ppop Favorite Vocalist of the Year — Stell
- Ppop Favorite Rapper of the Year – Josh
- Ppop Favorite Dancer of the Year – Ken
- Ppop Favorite Visual of the Year — Justin
- Ppop Favorite Leader of the Year — Pablo
- Ppop Favorite Fashion Icon of the Year — Pixie Nicole
- Ppop Favorite Group of the Year — SB19

=== Artists with multiple nominations and awards ===
Artists with multiple nominations
Nominations	Artist
6	SB19
3	Bini

Artists with multiple wins
Awards	Artist
5	SB19

== Performers ==
Performers
Name(s)	Ref.
Hori7on	
DIV9	
Rey Cariaso
Anna
GEM&I
Everchild
VLST
MNL48
Cloud 7
YGIG
OneVerse
6ense
Azter
Neo
SY·NC
Pixie
Vvink
One South
