= Alexei Abella =

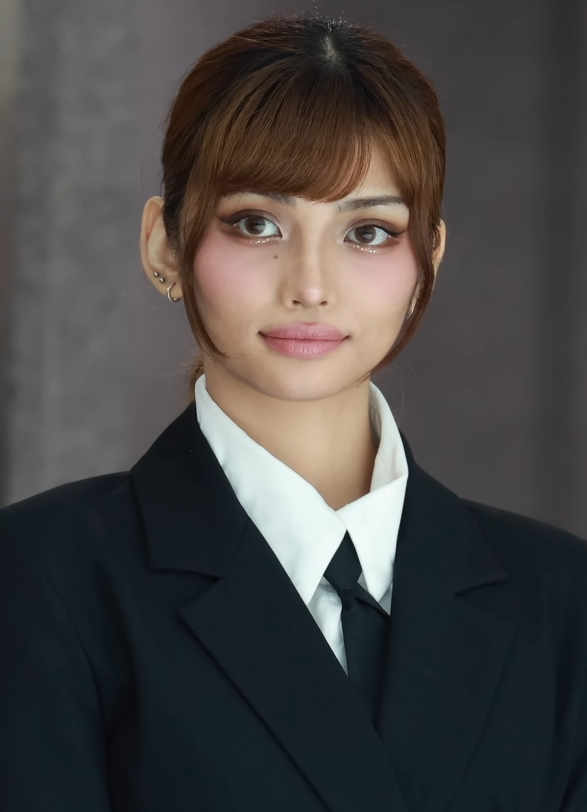
- Abella in June 2024
- Born: Alexei Claire Abella; August 6, 2002 (age 24); Cebu City, Philippines
- Occupations: Actress; dancer; singer; content creator
- Years active: 2022-present
- Musical career
- Formerly of: YGIG

Alexei Claire Abella (born August 6, 2002), sometimes credited as simply Alexei Claire, is a Filipino actress, dancer, singer, and content creator. In 2022, she debuted as a member of YGIG, but left the girl group in 2025. In March, she starred in the music video for "Bughaw" (transl. Blue) by Maki.

== Early life and education ==
Alexei Claire Abella was born in Cebu City on August 6, 2002. Before debuting in YGIG, she was a member of an all-Cebuano dance group called Ignite Dance Crew. Abella and the group won the silver medal on October 10, 2017 and won third place on October 14, 2018 at the World Supremacy Battlegrounds competition in Sydney, Australia.

== Career ==
Abella moved from Cebu to Manila to pursue her showbiz dreams. She beat out almost 20,000 other girls who auditioned for SBTown's new girl group project. After four years of training, she debuted as a member of the seven-member girl group YGIG (You Go, I Go) in November 2022. In an interview with The Philippine Star, Abella was quoted as saying, "Growing up, I loved being on stage. My dreams started as a dancer. I started in dance. My dream was to become a backup dancer and choreographer. And as time went by, my dream became bigger. And I really wanted to explore performing as well."

In 2025, Abella left YGIG. She starred in the music video for "Bughaw" (transl. Blue) by Maki, alongside Kyler Chua of Hori7on, Zeke Abella, and the singer himself. The video was highly anticipated, as it marked Maki's directorial debut. Before it officially premiered on Maki's channel on March 13, Maki held a launch event for the video called Bughaw Hour. Various celebrities and members of the press attended Bughaw Hour, which took place on March 12 at the Matrix Creation Events Venue in Quezon City. At the event, Abella admitted she felt pressure when filming because it was her first time acting in another artist's music video, but knowing that the story was about friendship made it easier.

== Filmography ==
=== Music video ===
Year	Title	Director	Ref.
2025	"Bughaw"	Raliug and Maki	
