= Pinoy Big Brother: Celebrity Collab Edition 2.0 =

Season of a Philippine television reality show

- Season 4
- Title card
- Hosted by: Bianca Gonzalez; Luis Manzano; Robi Domingo; Gabbi Garcia; Melai Cantiveros; Enchong Dee; Alexa Ilacad; Mavy Legaspi; Kim Chiu
- No. of days: 127
- No. of housemates: 20
- Winners: Caprice Cayetano; Lella Ford
- Runners-up: Heath Jornales; Krystal Mejes
- Companion shows: Updates; The OnlineVerse
- No. of episodes: 127

Release
- Original network: GMA Network (Note: The show also aired on Kapamilya Online Live, Kapuso Stream, and TFC. It was also streamed on-demand via iWant.)
- Original release: October 25, 2025 – February 28, 2026

Season chronology
- ← Previous; Celebrity Collab Edition

The fourth season of the reality game show Pinoy Big Brother: Celebrity Edition, subtitled Collab, stylized as Celebrity Collab Edition 2.0, aired on GMA Network for 127 days from October 25, 2025 to February 28, 2026.

This season features teen celebrities from the talent agencies Star Magic and Sparkle GMA Artist Center. As part of a collaboration between ABS-CBN Studios, the franchise holder, and GMA Network, the season continues the format akin to the preceding celebrity season, which sees housemates from both networks compete in groups throughout the show's run. The season is presented by a roster of hosts led by Bianca Gonzalez, with Luis Manzano returning as a presenter.

After 127 days, Caprice Cayetano and Lella Ford were named the winners at the finale held at the Crossroad Center.

This was the last season held at the Big Brother house on Eugenio Lopez Drive in Quezon City where it had been located since the inception of the Philippine franchise in 2005.

== Format ==
The season is the second run of the Celebrity Collab Edition, which features celebrities signed to the talent agencies Sparkle GMA Artist Center (locally known as Kapuso) and Star Magic (locally known as Kapamilya), with one housemate from each agency being named a winner at the end of the season.

=== Collab 2.0. format ===
On Day 8 (November 2), Big Brother revealed the "2.0" format. Before the duo phase, the housemates competed as part of various groups with equal members of Kapuso and Kapamilya housemates. Before the nominations, the groups compete against one another for immunity in Ligtask challenges. Afterward, the nominations take place, where each group nominates another group for eviction.

All members of the group with the most nomination points face the public vote conducted through the Philippine e-wallet Maya, with the Kapuso housemate and the Kapamilya housemate with the least votes being evicted from the house. On Day 58 (December 21), the show briefly reverted to the regular Collab format from the previous season, where the housemates compete as duos. However, unlike the previous season, the public votes to save housemates individually, rather than by pair. Like the previous season, the process will repeat until one Kapuso and one Kapamilya housemate are voted to be the Big Winners at the end of the season.

== Housemates ==
The cast of Pinoy Big Brother: Celebrity Collab Edition 2.0 Upper row: Anton, Clifford, Heath, Lee, Marco, Fred, Iñigo, Joaquin, Miguel, Rave Lower row: Ashley, Caprice, Princess, Sofia, Waynona, Carmelle, Eliza, Krystal, Lella, Reich

On Day 1 (October 25), all 20 celebrity teen housemates entered the house, tying the previous season for the largest cast for a celebrity edition of Pinoy Big Brother. Leading up to the series kickoff, eight of these housemates were revealed from October 21 to 24, 2025, with two housemates introduced daily through 24 Oras. Each revealed housemate was also featured in an exclusive individual interview.

Pinoy Big Brother: Celebrity Collab Edition 2.0 housemates
Name	Age on entry	Hometown	Agency	Occupation	Day entered	Day exited	Status
Caprice Cayetano	16	Quezon City	Sparkle	Actress	Day 1	Day 127	Winner
Lella Ford	19	Tacloban	Star Magic	Actress and content creator	Day 1	Day 127	Winner
Heath Jornales	16	Taguig	Sparkle	Actor and martial artist	Day 1	Day 127	Runner-up
Krystal Mejes	17	Samar	Star Magic	Actress	Day 1	Day 127	Runner-up
Joaquin Arce	18	Muntinlupa	Star Magic	Actor	Day 1	Day 127	3rd place
Ashley Sarmiento	18	Las Piñas	Sparkle	Actress and content creator	Day 1	Day 127	3rd place
Miguel Vergara	18	Rizal	Star Magic	Actor	Day 1	Day 127	4th place
Princess Aliyah	17	Bulacan	Sparkle	Actress and singer	Day 1	Day 127	4th place
Carmelle Collado	18	Camarines Sur	Star Magic	Singer	Day 1	Day 120	Evicted
Marco Masa	18	Rizal	Sparkle	Actor	Day 79	Day 120	Evicted
Marco Masa	18	Rizal	Sparkle	Actor	Day 1	Day 36	Evicted
Sofia Pablo	19	Quezon City	Sparkle	Actress	Day 1	Day 99	Evicted
Eliza Borromeo	18	Cavite	Star Magic	Actress	Day 79	Day 99	Evicted
Eliza Borromeo	18	Cavite	Star Magic	Actress	Day 1	Day 36	Evicted
Fred Moser	18	Albay	Star Magic	Actor	Day 1	Day 85	Evicted
John Clifford	19	Cebu City	Sparkle	Actor	Day 1	Day 85	Evicted
Anton Vinzon	17	Baguio	Sparkle	Actor	Day 79	Day 82	Evicted
Anton Vinzon	17	Baguio	Sparkle	Actor	Day 1	Day 71	Evicted
Rave Victoria	18	Tarlac	Star Magic	Actor	Day 79	Day 81	Evicted
Rave Victoria	18	Tarlac	Star Magic	Actor	Day 1	Day 71	Evicted
Iñigo Jose	20	Parañaque	Star Magic	Actor	Day 1	Day 50	Evicted
Lee Victor	16	Cavite	Sparkle	Actor and singer	Day 1	Day 50	Evicted
Waynona Collings	18	Quezon City	Sparkle	Actress	Day 1	Day 22	Evicted
Reich Alim	20	Makati	Star Magic	Actress	Day 1	Day 22	Evicted

== Houseguests ==
Within the framework of Pinoy Big Brother, the term "houseguest" designates an individual invited to enter the Big Brother house. Some of these houseguests are introduced with the explicit purpose of residing for an extended duration and deliberately chosen to influence the dynamics among the official housemates—thereby affecting relationships or altering the competition's trajectory. Conversely, other houseguests serve primarily as visitors; their stay within the house is typically brief, often entailing specific tasks assigned by Big Brother, or their presence fulfills a particular purpose. This can include, for instance, introducing a new game twist, presenting a unique challenge to the housemates, providing gifts to the housemates, or engaging them in conversation.

For this season, the following individuals entered as houseguests:

- Esnyr (Day 8)
- Piolo Pascual and Joshua Garcia (Day 16)
- Belle Mariano (Day 27)
- Ruru Madrid (Days 32–33)
- Will Ashley, Bianca de Vera, and Dustin Yu (Day 39 & 61)
- Shuvee Etrata (Days 43-45)
- Francine Diaz and Seth Fedelin (Day 49)
- Vice Ganda (Day 55)
- Clifford's mother Sofia Gawchua (Day 55 & 61)
- Heath's mother Jem Jornales (Day 55 & 95)
- Sofia's mother Rima Pablo (Day 55 & 63)
- Lella's mother Karla Estrada (Day 55 & 63)
- Miguel's mother Bing Vergara (Day 55)
- Rave's grandmother Helen Victoria (Day 55)
- Caprice's father Jorge Mendez (Day 59 & 93)
- Joaquin's mother Sunshine Samson (Day 59)
- Ashley's mother Jovel Altoveros (Day 60)
- Heath's father Michael Roy Jornales (Day 60)
- Krystal's mother Lorigen Mejes (Day 60)
- Carmelle's mother Neneth San Juan Collado (Day 61)
- Princess' mother Lallie Rabara (Day 61)
- Miguel's father Edward Vergara (Day 62)
- Fred's father Stefan Moser (Day 62)
- Anton's father Roi Vinzon (Day 63)
- Rave's mother Haidee Sarmiento (Day 63)
- Miguel Tanfelix (Days 72-73)
- Nadine Lustre (Day 73)
- UP Filipiniana Dance Group (Days 82-84)
- Klarisse de Guzman (Day 85)
- Beauty Gonzalez (Day 91)
- Sofia's father Christian Pablo (Day 94)
- Carmelle's cousin Myra San Juan (Day 94)
- Eliza's sister Chelsea Santos (Day 94)
- Angel Guardian (Day 95)
- Joaquin's father Neil Arce (Day 95)
- Kelvin Miranda (Day 97)
- Barbie Imperial (Day 98)
- Lella's sister Magui Ford (Day 106)
- Brent Manalo and Mika Salamanca (Day 107)
- AZ Martinez, Ralph de Leon, River Joseph, Kira Balinger and Xyriel Manabat (Day 108)
- Gladys Reyes (Day 109)
- Tim Yap (Day 114)
- Jillian Ward (Day 116)

== Episodes ==
=== Week 1 ===
No.	Title	Episode timeline	Timeslot	Reference	Original release date
1	"#PBBCollab2point0"	Day 1	Saturday; 6:05 PM (PHT)		October 25, 2025
This season of the Celebrity edition marked a first by featuring celebrity teen housemates drawn from both the talent rosters of ABS-CBN and GMA Network. These housemates were formally introduced in groups during the episode, beginning with Sofia, Joaquin, Marco, and Carmelle, who received their first task letter and were instructed to await further directions in the living room. They were followed by the second group of Heath, Krystal, Miguel, and Princess; the third group consisting of Anton, Eliza, Rave, and Waynona; the fourth group of Iñigo, Caprice, Lee, and Lella; and finally, the fifth group comprising Clifford, Reich, Fred, and Ashley. Once all the housemates were gathered in the living room, they were officially welcomed by Big Brother and informed of their first group task, which was set to double as a celebration for Fred's birthday. Carmelle was instructed to read the details of the challenge.: Task given: The task required the housemates to form a continuous human chain stretching from the living room all the way to a podium located in the pool area, where a birthday cake needed to be placed. The rules allowed them to use their clothing and bodies to maintain the connection, but the chain had to remain unbroken at all times; any break would force the group to restart the entire process. Fred had the specific role of being the only one allowed to place the cake onto the podium at the end of the pool area. Successfully completing the challenge would reward all the housemates with a welcome and birthday dinner.
2	"#PBBCollab20FirstNight"	Day 1	Sunday; 10:05 PM (PHT)		October 26, 2025
The episode opened with a recap of the housemates’ arrival, showing their entry into the House by groups on their first night. It then proceeded to feature their first official task, during which the housemates completed it for a reward. As part of the reward for winning the task, Fred received a birthday letter from his parents. Afterwards, the housemates were subsequently called and welcomed individually by Big Brother in the Confession Room.: Task result: The housemates successfully transferred the birthday cake from the living room to the podium in the pool area on their first attempt. As a reward, Big Brother treated them to a welcome dinner and a birthday celebration for Fred.
3	"#PBBCollab20Takutan"	Day 2	Monday; 9:30 PM (PHT)		October 27, 2025
The episode commenced with a recap of the conclusion of Day 1 inside the House. On the subsequent day, the housemates received their first wake-up call. Later that morning, they opted to establish groups to streamline the assignment of specific household chores. Additionally, the housemates were presented with a Halloween-themed task wherein they were required to enter the House in groups of two, three, or four. A clown will guide them to a "cemetery." Inside the cemetery, they must retrieve and collect a scroll found inside a tree.
4	"#PBBCollab20MultoNgBuhay"	Day 2	Tuesday; 9:40 PM (PHT)		October 28, 2025
Housemates continued to enter the House and cemetery by groups to retrieve the scrolls. These scrolls eventually played a major role in their next task.: Task given: In the life sharing activity called multo ng buhay (transl. "ghost of life"), the housemates took turns revealing their deepest personal burdens. Each housemate had to place his/her scroll into a cauldron of water. As the scroll became saturated, a word will be revealed, symbolizing the "ghost" of their life — be it a regretful memory, a person, or a thing they could not let go of.
5	"#PBBCollab20FaceUrMulto"	Days 2-3	Wednesday; 9:40 PM (PHT)		October 29, 2025
The episode began by skipping the conclusion of the emotional multo ng buhay activity, choosing instead to jump-start with a more lighthearted event: a pageant role-play. This activity featured Anton, Joaquin, Clifford, and Rave as dressed-up female contestants, and were all given makeup by Carmelle, Krystal, Ashley, and Lella. At the end of the pageant, Anton and Rave were declared the winners. Following this, the episode then returned to the main timeline to broadcast the remaining part and the conclusion of the sharing activity.
6	"#PBBCollab20Kandelabra"	Day 3	Thursday; 9:40 PM (PHT)		October 30, 2025
On Day 3, Caprice and Iñigo, the youngest female and male housemates, respectively, were summoned to the Confession Room by Big Brother and were informed of their first weekly task. They were concurrently appointed as the task leaders for the said task. Not too long after the challenge started, a candle fell on Iñigo's side. More than an hour later, Sofia accidentally breathed too heavily and snuffed one of the candles out. At the end of the day, the housemates decided that Lee and Sofia will no longer participate in the weekly task.: Weekly task given: For their first weekly task called the Candelabra de Horror, the housemates were required to continuously carry a candelabra or chandelier holding twenty lit candles. According to their own strategy, they must ensure that five housemates will have to carry the candelabra at any given time. The rules mandated that for every candle that fell or burned out, one housemate would be immediately removed from participating in the task. An evil laugh will signal the housemates as to when they will start in order for a group of five housemates to carry the candelabra and as to when such group will end in carrying the same. To win, at least one candle had to remain lit until the end of the week.
7	"#PBBCollab20CandLevelUp"	Days 4-6	Friday; 9:40 PM (PHT)		October 31, 2025
The episode opened with Big Brother asking the housemates, through Princess and Lella, to choreograph a dance for the season's theme song "Kabataang Pinoy." Clifford expressed concern that some housemates like Marco did not have enough food while there were many leftovers on others like Carmelle. Majority of the episode focused on the weekly task. The episode concluded with the housemates' first pool party.: Weekly task progress: As the weekly task resumed, two more housemates were eliminated from the task. Ashley and Miguel volunteered to sit out after they each inadvertently snuffed a candle. Big Brother asked the housemates to move around the pool while doing the task. There are also spare candles for those that completely melted but were not snuffed out. Two more housemates, Clifford and Reich, volunteered to sit the challenge out. Krystal expressed with Carmelle and Eliza her dismay towards Clifford's sitting out instead of those that snuffed the candles. At the end of the episode, only fourteen candles remain.
8	"#PBBCollab20LastKandila"	Days 6-7	Saturday; 6:15 PM (PHT)		November 1, 2025
The episode focused on the continuation and result of the weekly task. Discussions on their food portions and their weekly grocery followed.: Weekly task progress and result: Housemates had to go through an obstacle course and avoid a stand fan. Unexpected rain made the task even harder, resulting to three more housemates being eliminated from the task. The following day turned out to be the final day for their weekly task. A side of the pool had artificial rain, making the task even harder. In the end, only Iñigo and Rave remained. Big Brother said that for them to win, a candle must remain lit up after ten laps. The housemates took some time to add a makeshift cover to the two's raincoats. This proved ineffective initially for Rave as his candle was snuffed during the first round. However, Iñigo volunteered himself out of the challenge with the firm belief that Rave should be the last one standing in the challenge. Against all odds, Rave was able to protect his candle from the elements, handing the housemates the victory for their first weekly task.

=== Week 2 ===
No.	Title	Episode timeline	Timeslot	Reference	Original release date
9	"#PBBCollab20EsnyrYall"	Day 8	Sunday; 10:05 PM (PHT)		November 2, 2025
Following their wake-up call on Day 8 — signaled by a school bell — the housemates were instructed to gather in the garden area where four large platforms had been installed. Each platform featured four interlocking arms: two colored red and two colored blue. Big Brother subsequently announced that, departing from previous seasons' duos, this season would feature groups. Each group was to be composed of two Kapuso and two Kapamilya housemates, who would then collectively face challenges, tasks, and nominations throughout their time in the house. Later that day, Miguel and Clifford were summoned to the Confession Room. There, they received their next assignment from Big Brother: the housemates were to wear school uniforms, signaling the beginning of an upcoming task or theme connected to their new "school" wake-up call.: Entry of a houseguest: Former housemate Esnyr entered the House and participated in their group formation task by acting as Ma'am Castro—one of his online skit characters.; Group formation task: See Cycle #1 of group formation history.
10	"#PBBCollab20FirstGroupings"	Day 8	Monday; 9:40 PM (PHT)		November 3, 2025
The episode continued with housemate leaders Miguel, Krystal, and Carmelle discussing the implications of their leadership roles. Later, Big Brother gathered all the housemates in the garden area and announced that the leaders would immediately begin selecting their respective group members. The selection process proceeded with the five leaders taking turns. Each group was required to consist of two Kapuso and two Kapamilya housemates. Anton made the first selection, choosing Joaquin, Sofia, and Lella. Krystal followed, picking Iñigo, Marco, and Clifford. Carmelle then selected Heath, Rave, and Caprice. Reich chose Waynona, Fred, and Princess. Miguel, as the last leader, was automatically assigned the remaining unchosen housemates: Lee, Eliza, and Ashley. Following the formation of the five groups, Big Brother further announced that the fate of one group member would determine the fate of the remaining members of that group. A Ligtask challenge was scheduled to commence at the end of the week. The winning group of this challenge would secure immunity from the upcoming nomination. During the nomination, the group that accumulated the most nomination points would be put in jeopardy. Subsequently, one Kapuso and one Kapamilya housemate who received the least public votes would be evicted.
11	"#PBBCollab20Parusa"	Day 9	Tuesday; 9:40 PM (PHT)		November 4, 2025
As the housemates stepped out from their bedrooms, they saw school lockers installed at the living room. Moments later, they were asked to once again change into school attire. Big Brother revealed that each locker contains a report card which lists down all violations done by the housemate, if any. Violators were instructed to carry one enlarged rule book per violation. Seven housemates did not commit any violation and were spared from doing the punishment. Sofia, with five violations, was noticeably having a difficult time. Big Brother allowed housemates from the same group to transfer or to receive books and lift the burden, literally, off their teammates. After some time, Big Brother ordered them to walk around the pool, this time with their arms stretched. To end the punishment, the violators had to walk around the pool thirteen times, with one housemate of their choice ending their punishment per lap.
12	"#PBBCollab20Bahayanihan"	Days 9-10	Wednesday; 9:40 PM (PHT)		November 5, 2025
The episode opened with Lee worrying about how he raised his tone on Joaquin during the punishment. Waynona recollected the events on the day she left for the Big Brother House. The following day, Big Brother summoned Waynona and Joaquin to the Confession Room for their second weekly task.: Weekly task given: Their second weekly task called Bahayanihan is split into two parts. For the first part, the housemates, by groups, need to build dioramas that represents their families while sharing about them.
13	"#PBBCollab20Cleaners"	Days 10-11	Thursday; 9:40 PM (PHT)		November 6, 2025
Big Brother reprimanded the housemates for failing to maintain cleanliness in the house. He asked for two housemates per gender who are the most disciplined when it comes to cleanliness — Heath and Fred from the boys and Caprice and Sofia from the girls. They were tasked to clean the boys' room and girls' room, respectively. Iñigo expressed his dismay at how the housemates were not taking Lee as a leader seriously. Later on, the boys, except Lee, talked about Lee's leadership. Lee joined the conversation moments later and owned up to his shortcomings as a leader, saying that it was his first time to become a leader and he was excited.: Weekly task progress: Each group shared about their diorama and their families.
14	"#PBBCollab20Songerists"	Days 11-12	Friday; 9:40 PM (PHT)		November 7, 2025
The four housemates discussed their findings with the housemates and established rules to maintain cleanliness. Big Brother rewarded the four for their efforts and rewarded them with separate rooms for the night per gender. The next day, Big Brother called Heath to the Confession Room. He gave Heath his guitar. Heath performed his original song "Back to You" in front of the housemates at the living room. Later on, Big Brother summoned both Heath and Carmelle for a music task.: Task given: The housemates were divided into two groups: the musicians, led by Heath, and the singers, led by Carmelle. Together, they had to perform their rendition of "Kabataang Pinoy." However, the singers could only communicate via singing while the musicians could only use their instruments. To communicate normally again, they had to play charades. A representative from the musicians would act out a word and someone from the singers must be able to guess it correctly.
15	"#PBBCollab20Tore"	Days 12-14	Saturday; 6:15 PM (PHT)		November 8, 2025
The time has come for the housemates to do the second part of their weekly task.: Weekly task progress and result: For the second part of their weekly task, the housemates had to build a five-storey tower using the dioramas they made and red cups as pillars. A group may only start transferring their diorama once the previous group had finished placing their diorama on the tower. The housemates were given some time to practice. During this period, they were able to successfully build the tower. However, in the real run, they were only given thirty minutes. Carmelle's group had to rebuild their storey a few times. Reich's group only had less than a minute to transfer their storey. Unfortunately, some cups fell. With time not on their side, the housemates failed the weekly task.

=== Week 3 ===
No.	Title	Episode timeline	Timeslot	Reference	Original release date
16	"#PBBCollab20FirstNomi"	Days 14-15	Sunday; 10:05 PM (PHT)		November 9, 2025
Reich confronted Iñigo after the weekly task. The following day, the results of the first Ligtask challenge and the first nomination round were revealed.: Ligtask given: For the first Ligtask of this edition, groups had to use a giant marker tied to their legs to draw the solution to a maze. For every wall crossed, five seconds will be added to their time. The first group to attempt the challenge will set the time to beat and be given the Ligtask trophies. Succeeding groups must beat the said time in order to steal the trophies. From start to end, the trophies remained with Miguel's group, giving them immunity for the first nomination round. Krystal's group came close to dethroning them but failed to do so due to crossing walls six times.; Nomination process: See Round #1 of nomination history.
17	"#PBBCollab20Bigat"	Days 15-16	Monday; 9:40 PM (PHT)		November 10, 2025
The episode showed the aftermath of the first nomination round. The safe housemates consoled the nominated ones. The four were individually summoned to the Confession Room to share their thoughts or feelings. The following day, the housemates woke up to an unconventional wakeup call — dialogues from a movie trailer. At the living room, they saw a movie trailer playing on the TV. The housemates shared their excitement on meeting Joshua Garcia and Piolo Pascual, who will eventually enter the House later in the day as seen in the preview for the next episode.
18	"#PBBCollab20MeetAndGreet"	Day 16	Tuesday; 9:40 PM (PHT)		November 11, 2025
Big Brother summoned the fangirls of Joshua and Piolo, Ashley and Princess, respectively, to the Confession Room. The house was divided into two teams: Team Meet and Team Greet. The two houseguests entered the house. Piolo led Team Meet, and Joshua was the team captain of Team Greet. The two teams participated in a memory quiz about the trailer of Meet, Greet & Bye. They must grab letters to spell out the answer, and the faster team earns the point. The quiz was a best-of-five. Team Greet prevailed and were able to meet Joshua while Team Meet had to wait at the garden area. Team Greet were given lechon and pictures of their mothers. Before the houseguests left, Big Brother gave Team Meet one hundred seconds to say goodbye to the two. Ashley and Princess escorted Joshua and Piolo to the Confession Room. There, the two houseguests gave their jackets to the two fangirls.: Entry of houseguests: Piolo Pascual and All In housemate Joshua Garcia entered the house to promote their upcoming movie Meet, Greet & Bye.
19	"#PBBCollab20PhotoCake"	Days 16-17	Wednesday; 9:40 PM (PHT)		November 12, 2025
The episode opened with the housemates holding a mini-celebration for Caprice on the eve of her birthday. The remainder of the episode showed the events on November 10 which was Caprice's 17th birthday. Big Brother greeted Caprice in the Confession Room and gave her a task. During her birthday task, Waynona and Ashley asked the housemates to secretly write messages for Caprice. Rave read a letter from Caprice's grandparents. The housemates individually read their messages to Caprice. Her parents greeted her via a video recording.: Task given: Caprice had to stand on a big cake and become a human cake topper. From time to time, a picture of Caprice will be flashed on the TV. Caprice must share a story about the photo. Once the birthday song started playing, she had to change her outfit to be similar to the one in the photo and to match the pose as well. For non-solo photos, she had to choose housemates to act as the other people in the photo. Once the song was over, she and the other housemates on the big cake, if any, could not move nor talk until the next photo was flashed. The reward for completing the task was a cake.
20	"#PBBCollab20Aminan"	Days 17-18	Thursday; 9:40 PM (PHT)		November 13, 2025
The episode opened with the TV showing a clip of Lella at a shooting range. The TV then showed Anton doing martial arts with his father. Finally, the TV flashed a clip of Heath sparring with his father. The three aforementioned housemates were summoned to the Confession Room and were made the leaders of the third weekly task. Clips from past days or even weeks were then replayed to show the budding love triangle involving Miguel, Eliza, and Marco.: Weekly task given: For their third weekly task called Pinoy Big Bakbakan, the housemates must create a six-minute action sequence.
21	"#PBBCollab20Reward"	Days 19-20	Friday; 9:40 PM (PHT)		November 14, 2025
While Eliza was in the Confession Room, the boys serenaded the other girls with an original song. The following day, the nominated housemates requested for a bonding session with the remaining housemates. Big Brother gave them a task instead. The duration of their bonding session depends on their performance in the task.: Task given: The nominees had to blow feathers into a container. Each feather in the container is equivalent to one minute for their chosen bonding session. Within one hour, the nominees successfully blew in 29 feathers; they will have 29 minutes for their bonding session. The girls went for a nail session while Fred chose basketball for the boys.
22	"#PBBCollab20FirstEviction"	Days 20-22	Saturday; 6:15 PM (PHT)		November 15, 2025
The episode opened with the TV showing a news clip of Typhoons Tino (Kalmaegi) and Uwan (Fung-wong) devastating parts of the Philippines, resulting in hundreds of casualties and thousands of shelters damaged. Big Brother informed the housemates that their families were safe. The housemates packed relief goods for the typhoon victims.: Eviction result: During the eviction night, Bianca announced the results of the two voting rounds. Fred was declared safe, resulting in Reich's eviction. Shortly after, Princess was announced as safe, leading to Waynona's eviction. Following the results, the evicted housemates, Reich and Waynona, proceeded to the confession room, where Big Brother presented a tribute video and farewell message.

=== Week 4 ===
No.	Title	Episode timeline	Timeslot	Reference	Original release date
23	"#PBBCollab20Bakbakan"	Days 21-22	Sunday; 10:05 PM (PHT)		November 16, 2025
Majority of the episode focused on the weekly task. Clips from eviction day were also shown.: Weekly task progress and result: The housemates had to incorporate the following sound effects into their six-minute action routine: door kick, punches and kicks, arnis sounds, swinging of swords, gunshots, and an explosion. The housemates were free to put these sound effects anywhere in their performance. However, they had to learn the timing properly. Out of the thirteen times the sound effects will be used in the actual performance, they must be in sync at least seven times. After their performance concluded, Big Brother announced that they were in sync eight times and congratulated them for succeeding in the weekly task.
24	"#PBBCollab20SecondGroupings"	Day 23	Monday; 9:40 PM (PHT)		November 17, 2025
The housemates saw Christmas decorations and a plain Christmas tree in the living room. Big Brother assigned a Christmas-themed task to Ashley and Rave. Later in the day, the second group formation task was held.: Task given: Housemates had to make their own personalized Christmas tree decoration and share about it.; Group formation task: See Cycle #2 of group formation history.
25	"#PBBCollab20DearYoungMe"	Days 23-24	Tuesday; 9:40 PM (PHT)		November 18, 2025
Big Brother announced that the winning Ligtask group will also choose the group to be up for eviction. The next morning, the housemates saw AI-generated photos in the living room of themselves hugging their younger selves. Big Brother gave a task related to the pictures.: Task given: Housemates had to reminisce their life as a child. They had to write a letter addressed to their younger selves.
26	"#PBBCollab20Balagtasan"	Days 24-25	Wednesday; 9:40 PM (PHT)		November 19, 2025
Episode continued with the sharing from the previous episode. The following day, group leaders Ashley, Eliza, and Princess were summoned to the Confession Room and gave them their fourth weekly task. Later on, each group was called to the Confession Room and was assigned another task to prepare them for the weekly task.: Weekly task given: For their fourth weekly task called Laro Along Da Kalye, the housemates will play three challenges based on popular local street games. This task doubled as their Ligtask, as the group with the highest total points at the end of the three challenges will be safe from nomination and will choose the group to be nominated.; Task given: Groups had to engage in a balagtasan, a Filipino debate delivered in a poetic and expressive manner. The topic was why their group deserved to win and not the other groups.
27	"#PBBCollab20Tumbahan"	Day 25	Thursday; 9:40 PM (PHT)		November 20, 2025
First part of the weekly task/Ligtask was shown. In the end, Princess's clutch buzzer-beater broke a potential tie with the Smiling Angels and willed the Strong-willed Fighters to victory. The housemates garnered eight gold coins for the weekly task.: Weekly task and Ligtask progress: For the first part, they must play a variation of tumbang preso, a local street game where players throw slippers to topple cans. However, instead of slippers, they used slingshots. The damp rolled newspaper will be used as the "rock." The teams will race to topple all six cans of their team's color. The cans have varying distances and sizes. A group member can only topple a can once. At the end of the designated time period, the group with the most cans toppled will earn three Ligtask points, second group two points, and last group one point. Furthermore, each can toppled is equivalent to one gold coin. They must earn 27 gold coins at the end of the three challenges to win the weekly task.; Results: 1. Strong-willed Fighters - 4 cans - 3 Ligtask points 2. Smiling Angels - 3 cans - 2 Ligtask points 3. Determined Warriors - 1 can - 1 Ligtask point
28	"#PBBCollab20GulongGulo"	Days 25-26	Friday; 9:40 PM (PHT)		November 21, 2025
Weekly task and Ligtask progress: For the second challenge, housemates had to use a stick to push a wheel from the white line in to one of the holes. They must pass the previous hole before proceeding to the next one. The first three holes were wider than the last three holes. Like the previous challenge, a housemate can no longer do the challenge once they are done. The Smiling Angels blazed through the competition and finished the task before their rivals did. Strong-willed Fighters completed four holes. Eliza's last-gasp attempt lifted the Determined Warriors' tally to three points, not enough to change the overall result but could prove to be crucial when it comes to the weekly task.; Results after challenge #2; 1. Smiling Angels - 11 Ligtask points 2. Strong-willed Fighters - 9 Ligtask points 3. Determined Warriors - 4 Ligtask points
29	"#PBBCollab20MeetGreetBelle"	Days 26-27	Saturday; 6:15 PM (PHT)		November 22, 2025
The weekly task leaders welcomed Belle and toured her around the house while trying their best to hide her from the boys. After the girls' task ended, Belle proceeded to share words of wisdom with the housemates and had a meal with them after completing a special task assigned to the boys.: Weekly task progress: Since the housemates were able to complete 13 holes, they garnered 13 more gold coins for the weekly task bringing their total to 21.; Entry of a houseguest: Belle Mariano entered the house to promote her movie Meet, Greet & Bye and to, eventually, play hide-and-seek.; Task given (girls): Big Brother told the girls to hide Belle from the boys. The girls told the boys to play patintero with Sofia closely watching them, and the girls "practiced" a Christmas dance. Unfortunately, Clifford got too suspicious and spied on them, resulting in the boys' storming into the girls' room where Belle was hiding. No consequence was revealed for failing the task.; Task given (boys): The boys had to use their body to spell out words which turned out to be famous Filipino streetfood. Belle had to guess the word. Successfully doing this thrice rewarded the housemates a meal with Belle.

=== Week 5 ===
No.	Title	Episode timeline	Timeslot	Reference	Original release date
30	"#PBBCollab20SecondNomi"	Days 28-29	Sunday; 10:05 PM (PHT)		November 23, 2025
The third Ligtask challenge and second nomination round were shown in this episode.: Weekly task and Ligtask result: For their third challenge, housemates had to play sipako (combination of sipa and piko). Housemates could either use their foot or elbow to hit the sipa. Those in charge of using their feet must hit the sipa 5, 10, or 15 consecutive times, while those using their elbow must hit it 10, 20, or 30 consecutive times. The previous housemate must finish their set before the next housemate could start their set. A group could switch the order of sets with Big Brother's approval. Each cleared set was equivalent to one gold coin for the weekly task. The group that cleared the most sets within six hours received 30 Ligtask points, then 20 and 10 points for second and third, respectively. Smiling Angels cleared 5 sets, Strong-willed Fighters cleared 4, and Determined Warriors cleared 2 sets, adding 11 more gold coins for their weekly task. The housemates finished with 32 gold coins and passed the fourth weekly task.; Results after challenge #3; 1. Smiling Angels - 41 Ligtask points (SAFE); 2. Strong-willed Fighters - 29 Ligtask points 3. Determined Warriors - 14 Ligtask points; Nomination process: See Round #2 of nomination history.
31	"#PBBCollab20Damayan"	Days 29-30	Monday; 9:40 PM (PHT)		November 24, 2025
The episode showed the aftermath of the second nomination night. The Smiling Angels quickly approached the Determined Warriors to apologize to and console them. Big Brother summoned the nominees individually to the Confession Room to reflect upon their nomination.
32	"#PBBCollab20Network"	Day 30	Tuesday; 9:40 PM (PHT)		November 25, 2025
Big Brother assigned the nominees to be the weekly task leaders. Ashley and Rave were then tasked to be the hosts of the presscon for the launch of the PBB Network. At the presscon, the nominees gave a preview of what to expect for their shows.: Weekly task given: For their fifth weekly task called PBB Network: Ang Channel ng Totoong Buhay, the nominated housemates must come up with six live shows featuring each of them. The show must be related to their life. These shows will be livestreamed at 5:00 PM PHT from Days 33 to 35 on the official Pinoy Big Brother Facebook page. 1 Kapuso and 1 Kapamilya show will be featured per day. To win, the housemates must garner a total of at least 200,000 live views.
33	"#PBBCollab20KuyaRuru"	Days 31-32	Wednesday; 9:40 PM (PHT)		November 26, 2025
The housemates saw a golden luggage in the living room. They also saw a cassette player. The cassette tape they found contained an audio recording by an unknown individual (eventually revealed to be by the houseguest). Moments later, the houseguest made his presence felt again, this time from the Confession Room. Ruru eventually entered the house and got to know the housemates. Later on, Big Brother gave a task to the nominated housemates via Ruru. Eliza was the first to complete the task and received an audio greeting from her father.: Entry of a houseguest: Ruru Madrid entered the house.; Task given: For the task called "Ready, Cassette, Go!", separated by a giant cassette tape, the safe housemates must throw a "cassette tape" to the other side. The nominated housemates must work together and catch two cassette tapes each. The reward for housemates who caught two cassette tapes was a cassette recording from one of their loved ones.
34	"#PBBCollab20Day1LiveShows"	Days 32-33	Thursday; 9:40 PM (PHT)		November 27, 2025
The episode started with the conclusion of the cassette task and the remaining nominees receiving audio greetings from their loved ones. The following day, the housemates started rehearsing for Carmelle's and Anton's live shows. Selected clips from the first set of live shows were then shown.: Weekly task progress: For Carmelle's show, she held a virtual mini-concert titled "Ang Pangarap Ko'y Tagumpay" involving the housemates and houseguest Ruru. Anton showed a skit called "Ang Laban Ko" centered on his bullied days.
35	"#PBBCollab20ThanksRuru"	Days 33-34	Friday; 9:40 PM (PHT)		November 28, 2025
For being included in the first two liveshows, Ruru received an audio greeting as well from his father. The episode then showed the preparations for and selected clips from the second set of liveshows.: Weekly task progress: The second sets of liveshows were both short dramas, starting with Krystal's "Pangarap" and Marco's "Kuya Justin." The latter was about Marco's brother who has down syndrome.
36	"#PBBCollab20SecondEviction"	Days 34-36	Saturday; 6:15 PM (PHT)		November 29, 2025
The episode showed the preparation for and highlights from the third set of liveshows before proceeding with the eviction process.: Weekly task progress and result: Heath held a mini-concert titled "The Moon and the Stars," and Eliza held a talk show called "Eli Unfiltered: The Life of a Lucky Girl." The housemates earned 219,723 peak views and passed the fifth weekly task.; Eviction result: During the eviction night, Bianca announced the results of the two voting rounds. Anton and Heath were declared safe, resulting in Marco's eviction. Shortly after, Krystal and Carmelle were announced as safe, leading to Eliza's eviction. Following the results, the evicted housemates, Marco and Eliza, proceeded to the confession room, where Big Brother presented a tribute video and farewell message.

=== Week 6 ===
No.	Title	Episode timeline	Timeslot	Reference	Original release date
37	"#PBBCollab20CodeNames"	Days 35-36	Sunday; 10:05 PM (PHT)		November 30, 2025
Some housemates used "codenames" to talk about themselves and other housemates. This is a house rule violation and the repercussions of it will be revealed in the next episode. This episode also showed events from eviction day and the aftermath of the second eviction night.
38	"#PBBCollab20Violators"	Days 37-38	Monday; 9:40 PM (PHT)		December 1, 2025
The third group formation task was shown. The next day, the housemates woke up to an unconventional wakeup call. At the garden area, they saw four "prison cells." Throughout a period of time, a violation and the number of violators were flashed on the TV. After the final violation was revealed, Big Brother announced the violations tally per member per group. Afterwards, Big Brother told the housemates to get in their cells, which they would be staying in until further notice.: Group formation task: See Cycle #3 of group formation history.
39	"#PBBCollab20Selda"	Day 38	Tuesday; 9:40 PM (PHT)		December 2, 2025
Big Brother was displeased with how dirty his house was. He told the housemates to clean up the house. Three inspectors wearing personal protective equipment entered the house. On the first attempt, only the Dining Area passed the inspection. The housemates were given fifteen minutes to clean up the other four areas. These other four areas were successfully cleaned on the second attempt. Big Brother gathered the housemates in the living room to announce the total number of violations: 117 (including the 7 from housemates who failed to enter the cell in one minute at the start). He let the housemates free but warned them that they will be living in the cells everyday at designated times until further notice.
40	"#PBBCollab20Leksyon"	Days 38-39	Wednesday; 9:40 PM (PHT)		December 3, 2025
The housemates incurred nine more violations before bedtime, raising their tally to 126. The following day, Big Brother continued giving the housemates the cold shoulder, only communicating to them via the TV. Later on, he told housemates who wish to talk to him to enter the Confession Room. Rave's group was the first to enter, and they apologized to Big Brother individually.
41	"#PBBCollab20Consequence"	Day 39	Thursday; 9:40 PM (PHT)		December 4, 2025
A surprise house inspection happened. All five areas were deemed unclean, so all housemates earned a violation, raising their tally to 142. The day ended with the housemates being able to transfer 13 balls.: Weekly task given: For their sixth weekly task called Ang Apat na Selda, housemates must transfer black balls from point A to point B using a stick. The number of balls was equal to the number of violations. Every ball transferred by a housemate deducted a violation from their tally. Maintaining cleanliness in the House could also decrease the number of balls. However, additional balls will be added if any further violations are committed. They could only do the task while in their prison cells. The goal was to transfer all the balls so that all housemates will be acquitted.
42	"#PBBCollab20LoveYouSoBad"	Day 39	Friday; 9:40 PM (PHT)		December 5, 2025
Will, Bianca, and Dustin entered the house as inspectors. After giving their verdict, they revealed themselves to the housemates. They unveiled the poster of their upcoming movie in the Living Room.: Entry of houseguests: Celebrity Collab Edition 1 housemates Will Ashley, Bianca de Vera and Dustin Yu re-entered the house to promote their upcoming romance movie Love You So Bad.; Weekly task progress: The number of violations decreased after the housemates passed the inspection. The houseguests were allowed to help a group of their choice.
43	"#PBBCollab20BalLipat"	Days 37-41	Saturday; 6:15 PM (PHT)		December 6, 2025
The episode opened with scenes from previous days showing Princess and Fred. Fred used codenames and incurred a violation. The episode returned to the main broadcast timeline and showed the penultimate day of the weekly task.: Weekly task progress: Big Brother increased the difficulty of the task. The balls had to be passed to all four cells before it can be transferred to point B. Only one ball can be transferred at a time.

=== Week 7 ===
No.	Title	Episode timeline	Timeslot	Reference	Original release date
44	"#PBBCollab20ThirdNomi"	Days 42-43	Sunday; 10:05 PM (PHT)		December 7, 2025
The final day of the weekly task and the third nomination night were shown.: Weekly task progress and result: Prior to the final day, the housemates were only able to transfer 50 out of 123 balls. On the final day, they were only able to transfer two more balls and failed the weekly task.; Nomination process: See Round #3 of nomination history.
45	"#PBBCollab20ShuveeOnDuty"	Days 43-44	Monday; 9:40 PM (PHT)		December 8, 2025
Big Brother divided the house by gender. Only Shuvee was allowed to talk to both parties.: Entry of a houseguest: Celebrity Collab Edition 1 housemate Shuvee Etrata re-entered the house.
46	"#PBBCollab20BakitList"	Day 44	Tuesday; 9:40 PM (PHT)		December 9, 2025
The girls expressed how uncomfortable they were with the boys' inappropriate jokes. Big Brother told Shuvee to host a talk show called Bakit Ba? (transl. Why is It?) using the questions of both groups.: Task given: Each group had to write questions addressed to the other group.
47	"#PBBCollab20Letters"	Days 44-45	Wednesday; 9:40 PM (PHT)		December 10, 2025
Big Brother instructed the housemates to write letters to the other group. The boys read their messages from the girls.
48	"#PBBCollab20Reunited"	Days 45-46	Thursday; 9:40 PM (PHT)		December 11, 2025
The girls read their messages from the boys. The housemates were reunited. The following day, Big Brother summoned Lee and Lella to the Confession Room and informed them that Shuvee would be leaving the House on that day. They thought of holding a mini program for her. The following day, Fred and Lee were summoned to the Confession Room and assigned as weekly task leaders.: Weekly task given: For their seventh weekly task called Patong-Patong na Presents, housemates had to act as Christmas elves and stack the sixteen presents found under the Christmas tree.
49	"#PBBCollab20ElvesAtWork"	Day 46	Friday; 9:40 PM (PHT)		December 12, 2025
Additional info regarding the weekly task was revealed. Lee did his good deed for Carmelle, while Heath cooked a pancake for Caprice.: Weekly task progress: Housemates had to carry a present, then walk around the Christmas tree, then come back and stack their present on top of the next housemate's. The cycle repeated until the last housemate could walk around the Christmas tree with all sixteen presents or a housemate fumbled. The housemates' best attempt will determine the result of the weekly task. Each multiple of four is a milestone. 25% of the weekly budget is at stake per milestone. Unbeknownst to the safe housemates, each milestone is also equivalent to one "good deed" by a nominee to a housemate of their choice.
50	"#PBBCollab20ThirdEviction"	Days 47-50	Saturday; 6:15 PM (PHT)		December 13, 2025
The final day of the weekly task and the third eviction night were shown.: Weekly task progress and result: The housemates' best attempt was ten boxes, awarding them fifty percent of the weekly budget.; Eviction result: During the eviction night, Bianca announced the results of the voting rounds. Heath was declared safe, resulting in Lee's eviction. Shortly after, Fred was announced as safe, leading to Iñigo's eviction. Following the results, the evicted housemates, Lee and Iñigo, proceeded to the confession room, where Big Brother presented a tribute video and farewell message.

=== Week 8 ===
No.	Title	Episode timeline	Timeslot	Reference	Original release date
51	"#PBBCollab20FranSethVisit"	Days 49-50	Sunday; 10:05 PM (PHT)		December 14, 2025
FranSeth entered the house. Scenes from eviction day and the aftermath of the third eviction night were shown.: Entry of houseguests: Francine Diaz and Otso housemate Seth Fedelin entered the house to promote their upcoming horror movie Shake, Rattle & Roll Evil Origins.
52	"#PBBCollab20Pinakamabuti"	Day 51	Monday; 9:40 PM (PHT)		December 15, 2025
Two giant gifts were seen in the garden area. Big Brother told them that these are "gifts of immunity." They are only for the nicest housemates. One by one, Big Brother summoned each housemate to the Confession Room and asked them to name the four nicest housemates.: Weekly task given: For their eighth weekly task called Namamasko Po, the housemates would be caroling inside the Big Brother House from 6:00 p.m. to 10:00 p.m. on Tuesday to Friday (Days 53-56). Each ₱ 1,000 they would earn is equivalent to one percent of the weekly budget. The housemates would be learning eight classic Christmas songs and two original songs. The pricing and singers per song were revealed. The proceeds from the weekly task will go to charity.
53	"#PBBCollab20ImmunityTask"	Days 51-52	Tuesday; 9:40 PM (PHT)		December 16, 2025
The four nicest housemates per talent agency were revealed, for details see Gift of Immunity voting. For the Sparkle housemates, they were Caprice, Clifford, Heath, and Sofia; for Star Magic housemates, they were Krystal, Lella, Miguel, and Rave.: Immunity challenge given and result: Housemates had to roll a ball through gates on a track. The farthest gate the ball passed would be their score for that attempt. They only had two hours for this. The Sparkle and Star Magic housemates with the highest points earned a reward for the final test, while the Sparkle and Star Magic housemates with the lowest score no longer had a chance to win the Gift of Immunity. This episode showed the Sparkle housemates taking on the task. Heath earned the reward, while Caprice was eliminated after garnering the fewest points.
54	"#PBBCollab20Carolling"	Days 52-53	Wednesday; 9:40 PM (PHT)		December 17, 2025
The immunity challenge for the Star Magic housemates and the first day of caroling were shown.: Immunity challenge given and result: This episode showed the Star Magic housemates taking on the task. Miguel earned the reward, while Krystal was eliminated after garnering the fewest points. The second and third ranked housemates for both talent agencies still had a chance to get an advantage for the final challenge via Padaluck. Voting opened immediately and ran until noon of December 20. For more details, see Padaluck vote.
55	"#PBBCollab20PaskoStory"	Days 53-54	Thursday; 9:40 PM (PHT)		December 18, 2025
Some more caroling scenes were shown. The housemates were given a task about sharing about someone who showed kindness to them.: Weekly task progress: The housemates continued caroling. Notable requestors included loved ones and ex-housemates.
56	"#PBBCollab20XmasSocks"	Day 54	Friday; 9:40 PM (PHT)		December 19, 2025
TBD: Task given: In order to be able to give gifts to those who showed kindness to them, must use the available materials in the garden area to grab the Christmas socks with their name on it.; Weekly task progress and result: On their first day, the housemates earned ₱ 35,356. On the second day, the housemates earned ₱ 68,924 for a running total of ₱ 104,280, unofficially passing the weekly task with a day to spare.
57	"#PBBCollab20CallMeMeVice"	Day 55	Saturday; 6:15 PM (PHT)		December 20, 2025
Vice entered the house. She talked to the housemates about their experience with their mothers. Afterwards, the six housemates still in the running for the Gift of Immunity were individually summoned to the Task Room. They were given 100 seconds to talk to their mothers (grandmother in Rave's case).: Entry of houseguest: Vice Ganda re-entered the house to promote his upcoming comedy drama movie Call Me Mother.

=== Week 9 ===
No.	Title	Episode timeline	Timeslot	Reference	Original release date
58	"#PBBCollab20FamiLove"	Days 55-56	Sunday; 6:15 PM (PHT)		December 21, 2025
The episode resumed with Sofia and Miguel calling their mothers. Afterwards, the episode returned to the main broadcast timeline and showed The housemates' final day of caroling after a one-day break. The episode then jumped to the final immunity challenge.: Immunity challenge given and result (Star Magic): Housemates had to stand as long as possible on top of wooden blanks while holding a gift. At random intervals, one wooden blank would be removed. For finishing the previous task first and for winning the Padaluck vote, Miguel and Lella earned a 3-minute rest period each. The rest period can be used in one sitting or be split in parts. In the end, Miguel outlasted both Lella and Rave to claim the Gift of Immunity.
59	"#PBBCollab20ImmuniTest"	Days 56-58	Monday; 9:40 PM (PHT)		December 22, 2025
The episode showed the nicest Sparkle housemates taking on the immunity challenge. The following day, the first duo formation was held. Viewers had the opportunity to give one duo the Gift of Immunity. Heath and Miguel were automatically paired and safe from nomination.: Immunity challenge result (Sparkle): For finishing the previous task first and for winning the Padaluck vote, Heath and Clifford earned a 3-minute rest period each. In the end, Heath outlasted both Clifford and Sofia to claim the Gift of Immunity.; Duo formation task: See Cycle #4 of group and duo formation history.
60	"#PBBCollab20RegaLove"	Day 59	Tuesday; 9:40 PM (PHT)		December 23, 2025
The housemates saw the TV showing gifts located at the entrance of the Big Brother House. Caprice and Joaquin were summoned to the Confession Room and became the leaders of the weekly task. Caprice and Joaquin took on the weekly task. Both Caprice and Joaquin successfully pedaled the required distance. Caprice was summoned to the Confession Room. One last challenge awaited at the Task Room. An unknown person would reach their hand out, and they must be able to identify which one belongs to their loved one. If successful, they would get to meet their loved one and receive their gift. Caprice successfully identified her father Jorge's hand and got to talk with him. She received a luxury bag.: Weekly task given: For their ninth weekly task called Paskong Hatid Regalo, the housemates, as duos, would assign one to be Santa Claus and one to be a reindeer. The reindeer must pedal the distance shown which, unbeknownst to them, is the distance from their current house to the Big Brother House. Only the housemates who have their name shown on the screen will have the opportunity to do the task and open their gifts on that day. The episode ended with Joaquin taking on the task.
61	"#PBBCollab20PadyakPamasko"	Days 59-60	Wednesday; 9:40 PM (PHT)		December 24, 2025
The episode commenced with Joaquin taking on the final challenge. He successfully identified his mother Sunshine's hand and received her gift, a necklace. The following day, the next set of housemates took on the weekly task. Krystal and Ashley successfully identified their loved one's hand and received their gifts.: Weekly task progress: On this day, Ashley, Heath, and Krystal had the opportunity to do the weekly task. The three and their duos successfully pedaled the required distance.
62	"#PBBCollab20PaskoTogether"	Days 60-61	Thursday; 9:40 PM (PHT)		December 25, 2025
Big Brother summoned the task leaders Caprice and Joaquin to the Confession Room to inform them of the updated mechanics for the weekly task.: Weekly task progress: A new method was introduced for getting presents. Caprice and Joaquin had to do a photo op with the housemate. They had five shots. On the fifth shot, their loved one would "photobomb" the picture. The housemate must not be aware of their loved one's presence until they received the fifth picture.
63	"#PBBCollab20PaskoPaRin"	Days 61-62	Friday; 9:40 PM (PHT)		December 26, 2025
More housemates got their presents via the photo op method.
64	"#PBBCollab20LYSBChristmas"	Days 61-63	Saturday; 6:15 PM (PHT)		December 27, 2025
Will Ashley, Bianca de Vera, and Dustin Yu re-entered the House to give the housemates the Gift of Inspiration. A new way to get presents for the weekly task was introduced.: Weekly task progress: A new method for getting the gifts was introduced. Anton and Lella had to look for their gifts in the Task Room. Moments later, their loved one would join them.

=== Week 10 ===
No.	Title	Episode timeline	Timeslot	Reference	Original release date
65	"#PBBCollab20FourthNomi"	Days 63-64	Sunday; 6:15 PM (PHT)		December 28, 2025
Final day of the weekly task was shown. The lone and final housemate who had the opportunity this day was Rave. The following day, Big Brother announces that Caprice and Joaquin are also safe from nomination along with Heath and Miguel, Before the episode ends, Bianca Gonzalez announced that the number of nominated duos is three and the nominated duos as well.: Weekly task progress and result: In the start of the episode, Big Brother talked to Caprice, Ashley and Joaquin about their secret task and then Ashley helped Rave to travel from Big Brother's house to Tarlac with a distance of 88.74km. A flashback of Rave's relationship with his mother was shown: first, from sharing his multo sa buhay; and last, from Vice Ganda's visit. Rave finds the gift of her grandmother, and then was reunited with his mother afterwards. His mother explained her side to him and gave her gift too. In the end, they successfully won their weekly task.; Nomination process: See Round #4 of nomination history.
66	"#PBBCollab20BallPosal"	Days 64-65	Monday; 9:40 PM (PHT)		December 29, 2025
The episode showed the aftermath of the fourth nomination night. The next day, Big Brother announced the "KISLAP! The Sparkling Magical New Year Ball" and challenged the male housemates to prepare creative promposals to officially invite their chosen partners to the celebration.The male and female housemates had a makeover. Afterwards, the male housemates each proposed to a female housemate of their choice: Joaquin to Lella, Clifford to Sofia, Anton to Krystal, and Heath to Caprice.
67	"#PBBCollabHousemates2point0"	Days 65-66	Tuesday; 9:40 PM (PHT)		December 30, 2025
The "prom-posals" continued as Fred proposed to Princess, Miguel to Carmelle, and Rave to Ashley. The following day, Big Brother gave a task to the housemates.: Task given: Big Brother assigned a year-end reflection task in which each housemate carried a symbolic house from the 2025 platform to the center. Before moving it to the 2026 platform, they shared the habits, fears, and resentments they wanted to leave behind in 2025, as well as the qualities they wished to develop, the strength they hoped to show, and the forgiveness or healing they wanted to begin in 2026.; During the activity, the housemates openly reflected on their personal struggles and aspirations. Miguel talked about overcoming overthinking and becoming more open to others, Sofia focused on self-forgiveness and confidence, Caprice reflected on letting go of perfectionism, Lella and Heath discussed overcoming social anxiety and fear of public speaking, while Rave shared his goal of healing his inner child and being kinder to himself. The episode concluded with Big Brother encouraging everyone to leave behind the burdens of 2025 and embrace the new year with hope, growth, and renewed purpose.
68	"#PBBCollab20CommitMates"	Day 66	Wednesday; 9:20 PM (PHT)		December 31, 2025
This episode still continue the task. Each housemate opens up about their own journey—Krystal talks about letting go of pride and becoming more vulnerable, Clifford reflects on seeking validation from others, Fred and Ashley admit to struggling with procrastination, Carmelle shares her desire to express her emotions more openly, Anton speaks about overcoming anxiety and self-doubt, Joaquin aims to stop fearing failure, and Princess commits to practicing self-love and believing in her abilities. Through this heartfelt activity, the housemates encourage one another to embrace growth, healing, and positive change. The episode concludes with Big Brother reminding them to leave behind the burdens of 2025 while carrying forward the lessons they have learned and the dreams they hope to achieve in 2026, as they prepare for the upcoming New Year's Ball.
69	"#PBBCollab20Kislap"	Day 67	Thursday; 9:40 PM (PHT)		January 1, 2026
Scenes from Kislap: The Sparkling Magical New Year Ball were shown. Each pair was introduced. A duet from Clifford and Carmelle was shown. Afterwards, Big Brother gave them a task (see task below), to which Joaquin, Lella, Anton, and Krystal presented theirs first.: Task given: Each housemate had to share about one word they wish to uphold in 2026.
70	"#PBBCollab20Ball"	Days 67-68	Friday; 9:40 PM (PHT)		January 2, 2026
The events of Kislap: The Sparkling Magical New Year Ball continued. Separate performances from Princess with Ashley on the guitar, and Heath were shown. Continuing with the earlier task, Miguel, Carmelle, Clifford, Sofia, Heath, and Caprice shared their one word they wish to uphold in 2026. Big Brother gave each pair the time to dance to the music.
71	"#PBBCollab20FourthEviction"	Days 68-71	Saturday; 6:15 PM (PHT)		January 3, 2026
This episode centers on the housemates' New Year celebration and the emotional fourth eviction night. They welcome 2026 with a formal New Year Ball, where Heath and Caprice are chosen as the Kislap Ball King and Queen. The housemates also share their personal mantras and goals for the new year, then place their written aspirations on a symbolic pillar in the garden as a sign of hope and commitment. The episode then proceeded to the live eviction process. At the end of the episode, the hosts hinted at something "W" related.: Eviction result: During the eviction night, Bianca announced the results of the voting rounds. Ashley and Princess were declared safe, resulting in Anton's eviction. Shortly after, Fred and Krystal were announced as safe, leading to Rave's eviction. Following the results, the evicted housemates, Anton and Rave, proceeded to the confession room, where Big Brother presented a tribute video and farewell message and their emotional reunions with their families outside the house.

=== Week 11 ===
No.	Title	Episode timeline	Timeslot	Reference	Original release date
72	"#PBBCollab20Talon2026"	Days 70-71	Sunday; 6:15 PM (PHT)		January 4, 2026
The episode showed the tenth weekly task and scenes from eviction day. The Big Wildcard mechanic from the previous season officially returned. All eight ex-housemates were eligible. Each ex-housemate made a plea to the public. The two Sparkle and two Star Magic housemates with the highest votes will move one step closer to becoming an official housemate. They will then face off in a challenge against each other by talent agency to determine which Sparkle and Star Magic housemate will return to the Big Brother House.: Weekly task given and result: For their tenth weekly task called Talon-talon sa Bagong Taon, each duo had to wear two shirts: a 2025 shirt on top and a 2026 shirt underneath. They had to enter smoothly, remove the 2025 shirt while jumping a rope, and exit smoothly. Each mistake reset their progress. They were given 2026 seconds (33 minutes 46 seconds) to do this. They passed the weekly task with two seconds to spare.
73	"#PBBCollab20FifthGroupings"	Day 72	Monday; 9:40 PM (PHT)		January 5, 2026
The fifth leaders challenge was shown. During the task, Sofia realized that the story was about Kapuso artist Miguel Tanfelix. After the groups were formed, Big Brother asked the male housemates to prank Sofia. She was blindfolded in such a way that once she removed it, she would see "M"/"Miggy" in front of her. However, it's Miguel the housemate instead who showed up.: Group formation task: See Cycle #5 of group and duo formation history.
74	"#PBBCollab20CallPresNads"	Days 72-73	Tuesday; 9:40 PM (PHT)		January 6, 2026
Nadine mingled with the housemates.: Entry of a houseguest: Nadine Lustre entered the house to promote her comedy drama movie Call Me Mother.
75	"#PBBCollab20MiggyMoment"	Day 73	Wednesday; 9:40 PM (PHT)		January 7, 2026
Big Brother summoned housemate Miguel (referred to as Vergara for this and the next section) to meet houseguest Miguel (referred to as Tanfelix) to prank Sofia once more, but this time for real. Tanfelix also introduced the housemates to frisbees.: Entry of a houseguest: Miguel Tanfelix entered the house.; Task given: In a prelude to the weekly task, each pair had to throw and catch frisbees. Each caught frisbee is equivalent to five blocks for the weekly task, where they need 2000.
76	"#PBBCollab20TYSMiggy"	Days 73-74	Thursday; 9:40 PM (PHT)		January 8, 2026
Tanfelix left the house but not before cooking and having a meal with the housemates. The group leaders Clifford, Joaquin, and Princess became the weekly task leaders.: Task continuation: From the first and second days, the housemates caught 429 frisbees, equivalent to 2145 blocks for the weekly task. A hoop was installed at one end of the swimming pool. Each caught frisbee that passed through the ring was equivalent to 10 blocks. In one hour, the housemates did this 25 times, gaining 250 more blocks for the weekly task for a total of 2395 blocks.; Weekly task given: For their eleventh weekly task called Build and Balance, each group was split into two and placed on opposite ends of the seesaw. Each group had five hours to do the task. They must build a block tower on opposite ends of the seesaw without seeing each other. They could still hold the seesaw while building as long as neither group had reached one-foot. To win, both towers must reach a height of four-feet and stay stable for 10 seconds. One third of the weekly budget is at stake per group.
77	"#PBBCollab20BuildAndBalance"	Days 74-75	Friday; 9:40 PM (PHT)		January 9, 2026
The episode first showed Clifford's group taking on the weekly task. After their victory, Big Brother announced that two more groups from the outside world would be helping them out. The following day, the Sparkle ex-housemates took on the task.: Weekly task progress: Clifford's group accomplished the task within the final hour, securing 20% of the weekly budget.
78	"#PBBCollab20SecretAssist"	Days 75-76	Saturday; 6:15 PM (PHT)		January 10, 2026
The episode showed the continuation of the weekly task. The ex-housemates attempted it on the second day. On the third day, Joaquin's group went first before Princess's.: Weekly task progress: The Sparkle ex-housemates and Star Magic ex-housemates both failed to accomplish the task. Due to this, the max percentage of the weekly budget the housemates could obtain was 60%.

=== Week 12 ===
No.	Title	Episode timeline	Timeslot	Reference	Original release date
79	"#PBBCollab20FifthNomi"	Days 77-78	Sunday; 6:15 PM (PHT)		January 11, 2026
The episode showed the final day of the weekly task, the Ligtask challenge, and the fifth nomination night. The wildcard results were also announced.: Weekly task progress and result: Joaquin's group and Princess's group both failed. The housemates only got 20% of the weekly budget thanks to Clifford's group.; Ligtask given: Each group were split into pairs. The first pair had to hold a platform with a ball at the center and go through an obstacle course while ensuring the ball stays. They must then transfer the platform to the other pair and the other pair would go through the same obstacle course to place the ball in a box at the starting point. The group with most number of balls transferred earned immunity, the second place group had one Sparkle and one Star Magic nominated by the winning group, and everyone in the last place group was automatically nominated. Joaquin's group transferred two balls, Princess's one, while Clifford's zero.; Nomination process: See Round #5 of nomination history.; Wildcard result: From Sparkle, Anton and Marco topped the public vote by landslide while Eliza and Rave led the votes for the Star Magic ex-housemates. They are expected to faceoff in a challenge to see who will be the lone Sparkle and Star Magic housemate officially returning to the House.
80	"#PBBCollab20HardTalkHelps"	Days 78-79	Monday; 9:40 PM (PHT)		January 12, 2026
The episode centered on a conflict involving Joaquin and the resolution to the said conflict.
81	"#PBBCollab20Wildcard"	Day 79	Tuesday; 9:40 PM (PHT)		January 13, 2026
Big Brother gathered all housemates in the living room as they watched the Star Magic wildcards face off. Midway, they were asked to wait at the garden area. The winner would go out to the garden area.: Wildcard challenge given: For the wildcard challenge, Eliza and Rave had to pull a rope to get to the other side while balancing blocks that were sitting on a platform attached to the rope. If the blocks fell, they must restart. Once at the other side, they must put down the letter block they were holding. Once they have transferred 12 blocks, they must unscramble those into two six-letter words ("SECOND CHANCE"). Eliza finished the task and returned to the House as an official housemate.
82	"#PBBCollab20SecondChance"	Days 80-81	Wednesday; 9:40 PM (PHT)		January 14, 2026
Marco beat Anton in the same challenge to return as an official housemate.
83	"#PBBCollab20SongForYou"	Day 81	Thursday; 9:40 PM (PHT)		January 15, 2026
Ashley celebrated her birthday. The housemates surprised her and she received a video greeting from her family. One day, the housemates saw three different folk dance performances at the garden area.: Weekly task given: For their twelfth weekly task called Sayaw ng Filipiniana, housemates had to learn and perform three different folk dances — maglalatik, binasuan, and sayaw sa bangko. The first is for men, the second is for women, and the third is done in pairs.
84	"#PBBCollab20FilipinianaMoves"	Days 81-82	Friday; 9:40 PM (PHT)		January 16, 2026
The episode showed the housemates' first day of practice for the weekly task. During the practice for sayaw sa bangko, Fred, who was initially paired with Lella, requested for a partner switch with Joaquin so that he could be with Princess. Later, Princess set some boundaries with Fred.: Weekly task progress: Members from the UP Filipiniana Dance Group mentored the housemates. Ashley and Krystal were announced as the weekly task leaders.
85	"#PBBCollab20FifthEviction"	Days 82-85	Saturday; 6:15 PM (PHT)		January 17, 2026
The episode started with the housemates' practice for the weekly task. The binasuan performance of the female housemates was shown. The episode then proceeded with the eviction process. In a rare moment, the immediate aftermath inside the house was shown with Princess being unconsolable.: Weekly task progress: Big Brother revealed that in order to win the weekly task, the housemates cannot commit more than ten mistakes across all three performances.; Eviction result: During the eviction night, Bianca announced the results of the voting rounds. Heath and Ashley were declared safe, resulting in Clifford's eviction. Shortly after, Krystal and Miguel were announced as safe, leading to Fred's eviction. Following the results, the evicted housemates, Clifford and Fred, proceeded to the confession room, where Big Brother presented a tribute video and farewell message.

=== Week 13 ===
No.	Title	Episode timeline	Timeslot	Reference	Original release date
86	"#PBBCollab20DanceWithMowm"	Days 82-85	Sunday; 6:15 PM (PHT)		January 18, 2026
The episode started with the male housemates' maglalatik performance. This was followed by scenes of the housemates practicing sayaw sa bangko and the actual performance. The result of the weekly task was announced. The episode then showed Collab ex-housemate Klarisse's visit on eviction day. She was toured around the house and introduced to the gadgets inside the house. Later on, she cooked chicken curry for the housemates. Big Brother instructed her to give a live performance of the season's eviction song "Sa Isang Kisap" while the nominees were packing their belongings. After a while, Big Brother told her it was time to leave the house.: Entry of a houseguest: Celebrity Collab Edition 1 housemate Klarisse de Guzman re-entered the house.; Task given: Housemates were informed that there's a visitor inside the house (Klarisse). They must ask questions to uncover their identity. If the answer was correct, the visitor would tell the computer to turn specific lights in the living room green and red, otherwise. The housemates asked the right questions and were able to confirm Klarisse's identity.; Weekly task result: With only one mistake from binasuan (glass dropped from head) and three mistakes from sayaw sa bangko (housemates fell off the bench three times) for a total of four mistakes, the housemates passed the weekly task.
87	"#PBBCollab20SixthGroupings"	Days 85-86	Monday; 9:40 PM (PHT)		January 19, 2026
This day showed the aftermath of the fifth eviction night and the sixth group formation task. Big Brother also announced that three Ligtask challenges would be held.: Group formation task: See Cycle #6 of group and duo formation history.
88	"#PBBCollab20BolaMatchUp"	Days 86-87	Tuesday; 9:40 PM (PHT)		January 20, 2026
The episode showed the first ligtask challenge for this nomination cycle.: Ligtask given and partial result: For the first challenge, housemates must blow a ping pong ball to all six plates in a fixed order. If the ball fell off the plate, they had to restart. First housemate to finish for each round earned a point for their team. There were six regular rounds and two bonus rounds, with two points at stake per match for the latter. At the end of six rounds, Solid Six emerged from a 0-2 deficit and won their last four matchups for a 4-2 lead against Striving Feathers. After the first bonus round which saw the "weakest" housemates go against each other, Sofia gave the Solid Six a 6-2 cushion.
89	"#PBBCollab20RandomSiKuya"	Day 87	Wednesday; 9:40 PM (PHT)		January 21, 2026
The episode showed the culmination of the first Ligtask challenge and the start of the weekly task.: Ligtask progress: The second special round saw a showdown between the "strongest" players of each group. Eliza triumphed over Princess, extending the Solid Six's lead to 8-2.; Weekly task given: For their thirteenth weekly task called Ang Random ni Kuya, housemates must follow all commands Big Brother would be giving for a designated timeframe. They could only commit a maximum of five mistakes. Multiple mistakes within the same sequence were counted as only one in the final tally. The housemates perfected the animal sounds sequence, but they failed the sequence involving walking with pillows.
90	"#PBBCollab20StickAndRun"	Day 88	Thursday; 9:40 PM (PHT)		January 22, 2026
The episode showed the culmination of the second Ligtask challenge.: Ligtask given: For the second challenge, housemates had to use wooden sticks to pin a wooden shape and walk to the passing area to pass the shape to a different duo. That duo must go around a post on the other end and return to the passing area where the third duo would be waiting. The third duo must then bring the wooden shape to the finish line. Each transferred wooden shape was worth two points, and housemates had two hours to do the task. Another special round was held wherein each group did the task as trios. First group to transfer two shapes earned an additional ten points. Solid Six earned 182 points, while Striving Feathers earned 216 points including from the special round. Striving Feathers surged ahead of Solid Six in the overall race with 218 points as opposed to the latter's 190.
91	"#PBBCollab20ListenForReal"	Days 88-89	Friday; 9:40 PM (PHT)		January 23, 2026
The episode showed the continuation of the weekly task. After the first set of instructions, Big Brother summoned Heath and Miguel to the Confession Room and told them that only one housemate would be receiving his commands and that housemate would be tasked to relay his command to everyone.: Weekly task progress: The first task of the day had the Solid Six go to the garden area and the Striving Feathers stay at the living room. Each group then had to arrange themselves by listening and understanding skills from strongest to weakest. The following were the recipients of the individual commands and the command given to them: 1. Lella: The boys should go to the side of a pool and go in circles while doing a frog's motion. (Passed); 2. Eliza: Two housemates should carry Caprice around the kitchen counter thrice while counting up to 50. For every number with seven in it, they must bark like a dog. (Passed); 3. Joaquin: Do not follow my next command. Jump together five times. (Failed - housemates weren't supposed to jump)
92	"#PBBCollab20BeautyVsLies"	Days 89-91	Saturday; 6:15 PM (PHT)		January 24, 2026
The episode started with Beauty's visit. She played a game involving truths, lies, and drinks with the housemates. She also gave them some advice. Afterwards, the episode showed the continuation of the weekly task.: Entry of a houseguest: Teen Edition Plus housemate and 4th Big Placer Beauty Gonzalez re-entered the house to promote her GMA afternoon drama series House of Lies.; Weekly task progress: Big Brother announced that all housemates would be receiving his commands directly. The housemates failed two of the next three commands, raising their error tally to 4. For the final command, Big Brother asked the Solid Six to go to the garden area and the Striving Feathers to go to the living room. The Solid Six, individually, should choose two housemates from the Striving Feathers who were still lacking in authenticity and the reason for this. Carmelle and Eliza did not choose anyone, leading to another mistake in the tally. With five mistakes, this meant that the result of the weekly task hinged on whatever the Striving Feathers did.

=== Week 14 ===
No.	Title	Episode timeline	Timeslot	Reference	Original release date
93	"#PBBCollab20SixthNomi"	Days 91-92	Sunday; 6:15 PM (PHT)		January 25, 2026
The episode showed the culmination of the weekly task and the third Ligtask challenge. Details for the upcoming weekly task The PBB Bistro were also partially revealed.: Weekly task progress and result: Each member of the Striving Feathers chose not to name anyone, leading to another mistake in the tally. With six mistakes, the housemates failed the weekly task.; Ligtask given and result: Each group must lift a wooden platform with a hole in the center using handles attached to the said platform. They must place a ball on the platform and bring the platform to any box of their choosing and drop the ball there. the nearest box with the largest hole rewarded 10 points, 30 for the medium distance and medium hole, and 50 for the furthest box with the smallest hole. If the ball fell, they had to restart. They had four hours to do the task and to accumulate as many points as possible. The Striving Feathers took advantage of the Solid Six's persistence when it comes to scoring at the 50-point box and repeatedly scored at the 10-point and 30-point boxes to build a comfortable lead. The Striving Feathers earned a total of 5,728 points after the three challenges while the Solid Six garnered 4,090 points.; Nomination process: See Round #6 of nomination history.
94	"#PBBCollab20PapaChef"	Days 92-93	Monday; 9:40 PM (PHT)		January 26, 2026
The episode showed the aftermath of the Ligtask challenge and, virtually, the automatic nomination of the losing group. It also showed the start of a new weekly task for the housemates. Caprice and Sofia became the weekly task leaders. Chef Jorge Mendez, Caprice's father, re-entered the house and cooked breakfast for the housemates. He also played a crucial role in their weekly task. After the consultations, the housemates were able to try to cook their dishes.: Weekly task given: For their fourteenth weekly task called The PBB Bistro, the housemates will open a restaurant with a menu of five dishes for a full-course meal. Each pair of housemates must come up with two dishes they would like to serve. From Thursday to Friday (Days 97-98), there would be three dining batches per day. Part of the proceeds would go to the Big Charity Mission. Winning condition for this weekly task is not yet announced as of this episode.
95	"#PBBCollab20TasteTest"	Day 93	Tuesday; 9:40 PM (PHT)		January 27, 2026
The housemates continued their consultations with Chef Jorge. After the taste tests, Big Brother informed the weekly task leaders that on the next day there would be three food tasters. The housemates selected the five dishes out of the twelve that would be served to the guests.
96	"#PBBCollab20FamApprovedMenu"	Day 94	Wednesday; 9:40 PM (PHT)		January 28, 2026
The housemates served their dishes to the food tasters who turned out to be Carmelle's cousin, Eliza's sister, and Sofia's father.
97	"#PBBCollab20AngelSaKusina"	Days 94-95	Thursday; 9:40 PM (PHT)		January 29, 2026
Angel entered the house to help the housemates create a song for their bistro. On the following day, Heath's mother and Joaquin's father entered the house for the bistro's soft opening.: Entry of a houseguest: Angel Guardian entered the house.
98	"#PBBCollab20SpecialMeal"	Days 96-97	Friday; 9:40 PM (PHT)		January 30, 2026
The episode started with the continuation of the bistro's soft opening. Just as the soft opening concluded, Angel bade farewell to the housemates and left the house. Big Brother gave the nominated housemates a special task where each of them could cook for a housemate of their choice: Carmelle to Krystal, and Caprice to fellow nominee Heath.
99	"#PBBCollab20SixthEviction"	Days 97-99	Saturday; 6:15 PM (PHT)		January 31, 2026
The episode started with the continuation of the nominated housemates' special task where the other housemates cheered for Caprice and Heath as they return to the house from their friendly date. The task continues as Sofia offered a meal to Ashley, Joaquin to Lella, Heath to Krystal, and Eliza to Miguel.: Entry of a houseguest: Kelvin Miranda entered the house.; Eviction result: During the eviction night, Bianca announced the results of the voting rounds. Carmelle and Joaquin were declared safe, resulting in Eliza's re-eviction. Shortly after, Caprice and Heath were announced as safe, leading to Sofia's eviction. Following the results, the evicted housemates, Eliza and Sofia, proceeded to the confession room, where Big Brother presented a tribute video and farewell message.

=== Week 15 ===
No.	Title	Episode timeline	Timeslot	Reference	Original release date
100	"#PBBCollab20Bistro"	Days 97-99	Sunday; 6:15 PM (PHT)		February 1, 2026
The episode showed the remainder of the weekly task including Kelvin's departure on the first day. Afterwards, it showed scenes from eviction day and the aftermath of the eviction inside the house.: Entry of a houseguest: 737 Teen housemate Barbie Imperial re-entered the house.; Weekly task progress and result: To win the weekly task, the housemates must earn an average rating of 8 from the guests. They earned an average of 9.49.
101	"#PBBCollab20TheUltim8Twist"	Days 99-100	Monday; 9:40 PM (PHT)		February 2, 2026
Big Brother gathered the housemates in the garden area to announce the Ultimate 8 twist. Before the voting, Big Brother gave the housemates a chance to listen to comments from the outside world to aid their decision-making. Caprice did not opt to listen to comments from the outside world.: Ultimate 8: Four Sparkle and four Star Magic housemates will make it to the Ultimate 8. The first slots per talent agency would be decided by a Big Jump challenge. The first participants in the challenge per talent agency would be voted on by the housemates. The housemate per talent agency with the most votes would earn a Big Ticket to the Big Jump challenge.; Task given: Housemates were given the chance to listen to positive/negative comments about them or their fellow housemates from the outside world. Those who chose to were able to listen to five comments.
102	"#PBBCollab20BigTicket"	Day 100	Tuesday; 9:40 PM (PHT)		February 3, 2026
Heath and Krystal did not opt to listen to comments from the outside world. Later, housemates gave their vote individually at the Confession Room. They had to name one Sparkle and one Star Magic housemate. They may choose to name themselves. The Sparkle and Star Magic housemate with the most votes earned the first two slots in the Big Jump challenge. Big Brother revealed the results at the garden area. Housemates were asked to step forward if they voted for the housemate mentioned. Caprice secured the first Sparkle Big Ticket with four votes, and Lella earned the first Star Magic Big Ticket with five votes.
103	"#PBBCollab20KapamilyaTicket"	Day 101	Wednesday; 9:40 PM (PHT)		February 4, 2026
The episode showed the Kapamilya elimination challenge. Joaquin won and earned the right to face Lella for a spot in the Ultimate 8.: Kapamilya elimination challenge: Housemates must memorize the sequence of thirty objects displayed on the screen. Then, they must build a panungkit in order to grab those objects and place them in the cell in their designated shelf. Every now and then, the plasma would flash the correct order for a limited time. The first housemate to achieve the correct order earned the second Big Ticket for the Star Magic housemates.
104	"#PBBCollab20KapusoTicket"	Days 101-102	Thursday; 9:40 PM (PHT)		February 5, 2026
The episode showed the Kapuso elimination challenge. Marco won and earned the right to face Caprice for a spot in the Ultimate 8.: Kapuso elimination challenge: The challenge was divided into three parts. For the first part, the housemates are locked. To free themselves, they must count the number of triangles (27) displayed on top of a house drawing and subtract the said number by 8. They must multiply the answer by 6 to get 114 which was the code to unlock the lock. For the second part, they must repeatedly go around a spool of rope to lengthen it and to reach the colored blocks. For the third part, the housemates must stack the four blocks in such a way each vertical side has no repeating color. The first housemate to do so earned the second Big Ticket for the Sparkle housemates.
105	"#PBBCollab20BeyondWords"	Days 102-103	Friday; 9:40 PM (PHT)		February 6, 2026
The housemates woke up without a wake up call. GP Palma and Rack Corpuz from Kakamay Movement, a community for the deaf people, entered the house. The housemates were taught the basics of FSL. Marco and Princess became the weekly task leaders.: Weekly task given: For their fifteenth weekly task called Beyond Words, housemates must translate the theme song "Kabataang Pinoy" into a sign-song performance using Filipino Sign Language (FSL).
106	"#PBBCollab20SongLanguage"	Days 103-105	Saturday; 6:15 PM (PHT)		February 7, 2026
The housemates learned the FSL for "Kabataang Pinoy." They were also able to apply FSL outside of the task.: Weekly task progress and result: To win, the invited judge must be able to understand the meaning of the song. Based on what he wrote, he understood the meaning of the song, handing the housemates the victory for this weekly task.

=== Week 16 ===
No.	Title	Episode timeline	Timeslot	Reference	Original release date
107	"#PBBCollab20BigJump"	Days 105-106	Sunday; 6:15 PM (PHT)		February 8, 2026
The episode showed the Big Jump Challenge. Caprice and Lella triumphed over Marco and Joaquin, respectively, to secure their spots in the Ultimate 8.: Big Jump Challenge: Housemates must place blocks upright on a handle and traverse a path of their choice. The black lane deducted two points from their opponent for every block successfully placed in the box. The white lane added a point to the housemate's tally for each block put on the marked spot. However, the white lane was surrounded by blue blocks which subtracted a point from the housemate's tally for every toppled blue block. After one hour, the black lane was shut down. It was reopened during the final hour. After three hours, the housemate with the most points won.; Results: Sparkle: 1. Caprice (36 positive, -46 blue blocks, -97 from Marco): -204; 2. Marco (34 positive, -11 blue blocks, -138 from Caprice): -253; Star Magic: 1. Lella (49 positive, -105 blue blocks, -78 from Joaquin): -212; 2. Joaquin (13 positive, -123 blue blocks, -113 from Lella): -336
108	"#PBBCollab20BdayVacay"	Days 106-107	Monday; 9:40 PM (PHT)		February 9, 2026
The living room was transformed into a hotel lobby. Big Brother announced the opening of the PBB Hotel. Caprice and Lella were the hotel guests for securing the first spots on the Ultimate 8 while the rest became hotel staff. Lella's sister Magui entered the house to cook for her. The hotel staff distracted Lella. When Magui was finally ready, Lella went to her at the garden area.
109	"#PBBCollab20BrentAndMika"	Days 107-108	Tuesday; 9:40 PM (PHT)		February 10, 2026
Magui left the house. The following day, Brent and Mika entered.: Entry of houseguests: Celebrity Collab Edition 1 Big Winners Brent Manalo and Mika Salamanca re-entered the house to promote their upcoming mystery drama series The Secrets of Hotel 88.
110	"#PBBCollab20HotelBB"	Day 108	Wednesday; 9:40 PM (PHT)		February 11, 2026
A guest (Ralph) contacted the PBB Hotel and expressed their desire to swim. Unfortunately, the hotel staff so that the pool was dirty and not suitable for swimming. Big Brother gave them the materials for building an inflatable swimming pool instead. The housemates and the guests were able to swim in the inflatable pool.: Entry of houseguests: Celebrity Collab Edition 1 finalists Ralph de Leon, AZ Martinez, and River Joseph re-entered the house.
111	"#PBBCollab20HotelBBGuests"	Days 108-109	Thursday; 9:40 PM (PHT)		February 12, 2026
Entry of houseguests: Celebrity Collab Edition 1 housemates Kira Balinger and Xyriel Manabat re-entered the house.
112	"#PBBCollab20GladysToMeetU"	Day 109-110	Friday; 9:40 PM (PHT)		February 13, 2026
Gladys engaged in an acting challenge with some of the housemates.: Entry of a houseguest: Gladys Reyes entered the house.
113	"#PBBCollab20SecondBigJump"	Days 110-112	Saturday; 6:15 PM (PHT)		February 14, 2026
Big Brother announced the closure of the PBB Hotel. He then announced the return of the Big Jump challenge. The remaining eight non-finalist housemates would be competing in a series of challenges to determine the two housemates per talent agency that would participate in the second Big Jump Challenge.: Weekly task and Big Jump Challenge given: This task doubled as their sixteenth weekly task and the second Big Jump Challenge. The tip box acquired from the PBB Hotel contained 250 blocks. On their turn, each non-finalist had three attempts to launch a block into their basket. Housemates took turns in doing the task. They only had four hours to do the task. For the first five rounds, Caprice helped the Star Magic housemates while Lella helped the Sparkle housemates. They would get the weekly budget for the following week if and only if they successfully shoot all 250 blocks. Individually, the number of blocks they got would help them in the Big Jump Challenge. And eventually, they didn't get all the 250 blocks shoot inside the baskets, resulted to the failing of their 16th weekly task.

=== Week 17 ===
No.	Title	Episode timeline	Timeslot	Reference	Original release date
114	"#PBBCollab20Ultim8Nomi"	Days 112-113	Sunday; 10:05 PM (PHT)		February 15, 2026
The episode featured the last part of the 2nd Big Jump challenge that the remaining Kapuso and Kapamilya housemates faced to grab a spot in the Ultimate 8, which will also determines the seventh and last set of nominees for the season. Big Brother also announced that the last 2 spots for the Kapamilya and Kapuso Big Four will be determined through public vote.: Big Jump Challenge progress: For the second part of the 2nd Big Jump challenge, it is an endurance challenge. In this challenge, the housemates use the blocks they earned from previous tasks. They must place three blocks on a block holder, balance it on their hand, and carefully arrange the blocks so that none of them touch each other. If even one block falls, they must remove all the blocks and replace them with a new three blocks, reducing their available blocks. Since the blocks also serve as their lives, losing them brings them closer to elimination. The last housemate who successfully keeps their blocks balanced wins the challenge and secures a spot in the Ultimate Eight.; Nomination process: See Round #7 of nomination history.; Result: Ashley, Marco, and Princess competed in the Kapuso challenge with Ashley wins. In Kapamilya round, Krystal, Miguel and Joaquin face the same challenge, with Krystal claiming the win, earning their spots alongside Lella and Caprice in Ultimate 8.
115	"#PBBCollab20Ultim8Sacrifice"	Days 113-114	Monday; 9:40 PM (PHT)		February 16, 2026
This highlights the aftermath of the announcement regarding the latest set of nominees and their 17th weekly task, which prohibits Ashley, Caprice, Krystal, and Lella from stepping down into the Ultimate Eye Platform. It also features the sacrifice task of Miguel to provide the needs of his housemates living in the platform.: Weekly task given: For their seventeenth weekly task, called The Ultimate Eye, the first members of the Ultimate 8, which comprises Ashley, Caprice, Krystal, and Lella, are not allowed to step down into the Ultimate Eye Platform at all times. Once they do, they fail their 17th weekly task. However, they may separate the pieces of the platform to move around the house. They are also limited on availing basic needs and personal items. It will be granted to them through a sacrifice task which the nominees will be doing for them. The remaining housemates need to make sacrifices. Miguel takes on a difficult challenge of transferring water from the pool using only a spoon to earn drinking water for the group, inspired by the sacrifices his mother made for him.
116	"#PBBCollab20XtraEffort"	Day 114-115	Tuesday; 9:40 PM (PHT)		February 17, 2026
This episode focuses on sacrifice, gratitude, and inspiration. Miguel completes a demanding challenge of running 400 laps around the pool to earn food, pillows, and blankets for the housemates staying on the Ultimate Eye platform. Despite exhaustion, he stays motivated for his fellow housemates and the sacrifices his mother has made for him. Later, guest Tim Yap visits the house and shares inspiring life lessons, encouraging the housemates to embrace challenges, recognize the value of sacrifice, and find strength and growth through difficult times through his "Tim Talks".: Entry of a houseguest: Tim Yap entered the house.
117	"#PBBCollab20MalasakiTask"	Day 115-116	Wednesday; 9:40 PM (PHT)		February 18, 2026
This episode shows Princess's selfless sacrifices to help the housemates staying on the Ultimate Eye platform. She completes several physically tasks, including carrying a 10-kilogram weight for hours to earn food and collecting water from the pool to provide clean drinking water. Despite exhaustion and pain, she continues taking on more challenges to make sure her fellow housemates have enough to eat. Princess reflects on the meaning of sacrifice and draws strength from her family's love, especially her mother.
118	"#PBBCollab20WorthThePaypay"	Days 116-117	Thursday; 9:40 PM (PHT)		February 19, 2026
In this episode, it continuously highlights the housemates' willingness to sacrifice for those staying on the Ultimate Eye platform. Heath takes on a physically exhausting challenge, manually fanning the housemates for hours in the heat and later using both hands continuously to earn them food. Despite his tiredness, he remains determined, inspired by the sacrifices of his own family. Although he is unable to finish the entire challenge, he successfully earns three plates of food for his fellow housemates. Meanwhile, Carmelle is briefly involved in a misunderstanding over her meditation/sleep, which Big Brother clarifies. By the end of the episode, she accepts a new sacrifice task—standing on a platform—to help the Ultimate Eye housemates receive a shower and fresh clothes.
119	"#PBBCollab20StandWithYou"	Days 117-118	Friday; 9:40 PM (PHT)		February 20, 2026
This episode highlights the selfless sacrifices of the housemates to help those staying in the Ultimate Eye area. Carmelle completes a difficult four-hour balancing challenge, standing on one foot, so the Ultimate Eye housemates can take a shower and change into fresh clothes. She stays motivated by thinking of her mother's sacrifices. Later, Marco takes on physically demanding tasks, carrying and moving the Ultimate Eye platform around the house and accepting an additional challenge so the housemates can receive food.
120	"#PBBCollab20TheUltimate8"	Days 118-120	Saturday; 6:15 PM (PHT)		February 21, 2026
For this episode, Marco successfully completes his physically demanding challenge, earning food for the housemates while, Joaquin's sacrifice task involving wearing restrictive garter in his foot while performing chores and walking laps around the pool to provide food and water for his housemates. And also, the seventh and final eviction night happened and the final members of the Ultimate 8 was announced and the final evictees of the season was welcomed back to the outside world.: Eviction result: During the final eviction night, Bianca announced the results of the voting rounds. Heath and Princess were declared safe, and proceed to the Ultimate Eye platform, resulting in Marco's re-eviction. Shortly after, Joaquin and Miguel were announced as safe, and proceed to the Ultimate Eye platform, leading to Carmelle's eviction. Following the results, the evicted housemates, Marco and Carmelle, proceeded to the confession room, where a tribute video and farewell message from Big Brother reflecting on their personal growth and the Ultimate 8 preparing for their final journey toward the Big Night.

=== Week 18 ===
No.	Title	Episode timeline	Timeslot	Reference	Original release date
121	"#PBBCollab20RoadToBigNight"	Days 119-120	Sunday; 10:05 PM (PHT)		February 22, 2026
It highlights the visit of houseguest Jillian Ward, which she joined and interact with the Ultimate 8 in the Ultimate Eye platform, and eventually Carmelle and Joaquin did a sacrifice task also for Jillian to be released in the platform. And she also did a sacrifice task together with the housemates for the food and temporary release of the Ultimate 8 in the platform. Also, it highlights the last few sacrifice tasks that the housemates faced to officially conclude the Ultimate 8's stay in the platform and for their weekly task. And it showcases the aftermath of the Final eviction night and announcement of the final members of the Ultimate 8.: Entry of a houseguest: Jillian Ward entered the house.; Weekly task progress and result: With all the sacrifice tasks for the entire week being done successfully, the housemates passed their 17th weekly task and officially marks the end of the Ultimate 8's stay in the Ultimate Eye platform.
122	"#PBBCollab20TheUltim8Tapatan"	Days 120-121	Monday; 9:40 PM (PHT)		February 23, 2026
It features one of the ultimate tests that the Ultimate 8 will face before the Big Night, the grilling session or the Ultimate Tapatan and it started with the Kapuso Big Four: Ashley, Caprice, Heath, and Princess.: The Ultimate Tapatan: The Ultimate 8 faced the infamous grilling session, which tests their truthfulness, honesty, and personalities amidst the different issues and controversies, that will help the public to determine the big winners. The housemates need to answer a series of questions, related from their mantra for 2026, that came from the public, and came from the ex-housemates which also serves as the jury. After answering each question, the jury will cast their votes if the answer of the housemate is Truth or Lie.
123	"#PBBCollab20TruthOrLie"	Day 121	Tuesday; 9:40 PM (PHT)		February 24, 2026
The episode follows the continuation of the grilling session of Heath and Princess, and the Kapamilya Big Four: Joaquin, Krystal, Lella, and Miguel.
124	"#PBBCollab20OneMillionVotes"	Days 121-122	Wednesday; 9:40 PM (PHT)		February 25, 2026
It follows the last leg of the Ultimate Tapatan, which Joaquin and Lella are the last members of the Ultimate 8 that faced the grilling session. And also, the presence of the Big Public Eye came into the house which the Ultimate 8 may read some positive and negative comments from the public. And it introduces also the comeback of the One Million Votes Challenge that may help the housemates to secure the Big Winner title at the upcoming Big Night.: One Million Votes Challenge: Just like the other seasons, the housemates will be given a chance to earn votes through a series of challenges that will be combined with the votes that came from the public. And for this season, just like the preceding one, up to 1 million votes are up for grabs that will be added to the unlimited votes from the public.
125	"#PBBCollab20Ultim8BallHunt"	Days 122-123	Thursday; 9:40 PM (PHT)		February 26, 2026
As the Big Night draws near, the Ultimate 8 housemates face one of their most important tasks yet. Big Brother announces that the four white balls they earned are equivalent to 1 million votes, making them crucial to their chances of winning. The housemates must balance the balls on individual triangle holders while deciding how many each person will carry. If a ball falls and isn't picked up within five seconds, it is permanently deducted from their total. It became one of their serious-but-hilarious PBB tasks. The challenge becomes even harder as they battle exhaustion, physical pain, and distractions from mysterious "ninjas", public comments designed to break their concentration and the unusual silence of Big Brother, who does not communicate with them throughout the day. To protect the valuable balls, the housemates choose to sleep together in the garden area beside the poll so they can guard the ball throughout the night.
126	"#PBBCollab20FinalTask"	Days 124-126	Friday; 9:40 PM (PHT)		February 27, 2026
After a day without Big Brother, he returns to reveal that the Ultimate 8 have lost their four white balls, which represent 1 million votes for the Big Night. To earn them back, the housemates must complete a series of demanding balance and teamwork challenges. Despite multiple failed attempts, they refuse to give up. Motivated by heartfelt messages from their loved ones, they adjust their strategy by assigning specific roles to each member.: Final task result:In the final challenge, they successfully complete a relay task and keep all 40 balls balanced for 100 seconds, reclaiming the four white balls and securing the 1 million votes.; Big Brother reminds the Ultimate 8 for their resilience, teamwork, and trust in one another, reminding them that beyond the competition, the genuine friendships and family they built inside the house are the greatest prize.
127	"#PBBCollab20TheBigNight"	Day 127	Saturday; 7:15 PM (PHT)		February 28, 2026
Before leaving the house, the "Ultimate 8" housemates participated in a final task to distribute a pool of 1 million bonus votes they had accumulated from previous challenges. Each housemate selected a silver bar containing a hidden vote value—ranging from 20,000 to 300,000—and assigned it to another housemate. Princess received the highest boost with 400,000 bonus votes. Big Brother then delivered a final farewell, gifting each finalist a bracelet engraved with "Pagpapakatao" (humanity) as a reminder to prioritize character over simply "keeping it real.": Big Winner result: The live finale crowned two Big Winners, each receiving a ₱1,000,000 grand prize: Caprice was named the Kapuso Big Winner with 61.78% of the vote, while Lela claimed the Kapamilya title with 53.63%. The remaining six finalists placed second through fourth in their respective network categories, and it was also announced that the housemates successfully raised ₱600,000 for the Big Collab Charity Vision (for the details, see more on The Big Night).

== Group and duo formation history ==
Throughout the season, the housemates were periodically paired into groups and duos through tasks and other challenges.

Legend and color key

Sparkle housemate
Star Magic housemate
Group leader

Duration of group pairing
Cycle	#1	#2	#3	#4	#5	#6	The Ultimate 8 (Final)
Start	Day 8 November 1	Day 23; November 16	Day 37; November 30	Day 58; December 21	Day 72; January 4	Day 86; January 18	Day 120; February 21
End	Day 22; November 15	Day 36; November 29	Day 50; December 13	Day 71; January 3	Day 85; January 17	Day 99; January 31	Day 127; February 28
Ashley	Eliza, Lee, & Miguel	Caprice, Clifford, Fred, Lella, & Rave	Anton, Carmelle, & Miguel	Rave	Fred, Lella, & Princess	Krystal, Lella, Marco, Miguel, & Princess	Finalist
Caprice	Carmelle, Heath, & Rave	Ashley, Clifford, Fred, Lella, & Rave	Joaquin, Krystal, & Princess	Joaquin	Carmelle, Joaquin, & Sofia	Carmelle, Eliza, Heath, Joaquin, & Sofia	Finalist
Heath	Caprice, Carmelle, & Rave	Anton, Carmelle, Eliza, Krystal, & Marco	Fred, Iñigo, & Lee	Miguel	Clifford, Krystal, & Miguel	Caprice, Carmelle, Eliza, Joaquin, & Sofia	Finalist
Joaquin	Anton, Lella, & Sofia	Iñigo, Lee, Miguel, Princess, & Sofia	Caprice, Krystal, & Princess	Caprice	Caprice, Carmelle, & Sofia	Caprice, Carmelle, Eliza, Heath, & Sofia	Finalist
Krystal	Clifford, Iñigo, & Marco	Anton, Carmelle, Eliza, Heath, & Marco	Caprice, Joaquin, & Princess	Anton	Clifford, Heath, & Miguel	Ashley, Lella, Marco, Miguel, & Princess	Finalist
Lella	Anton, Joaquin, & Sofia	Ashley, Caprice, Clifford, Fred, & Rave	Clifford, Rave, & Sofia	Sofia	Ashley, Fred, & Princess	Ashley, Krystal, Marco, Miguel, & Princess	Finalist
Miguel	Ashley, Eliza, & Lee	Iñigo, Joaquin, Lee, Princess, & Sofia	Anton, Ashley, & Carmelle	Heath	Clifford, Heath, & Krystal	Ashley, Krystal, Lella, Marco, & Princess	Finalist
Princess	Fred, Reich, & Waynona	Iñigo, Joaquin, Lee, Miguel, & Sofia	Caprice, Joaquin, & Krystal	Fred	Ashley, Lella, & Fred	Ashley, Krystal, Lella, Marco, & Miguel	Finalist
Carmelle	Caprice, Heath, & Rave	Anton, Eliza, Heath, Krystal, & Marco	Anton, Ashley, & Miguel	Clifford	Caprice, Joaquin, & Sofia	Caprice, Eliza, Heath, Joaquin, & Sofia	Evicted (Day 120)
Marco	Clifford, Iñigo, & Krystal	Anton, Carmelle, Eliza, Heath, & Krystal	Evicted (Day 36)			Ashley, Krystal, Lella, Miguel, & Princess	Re-evicted (Day 120)
Sofia	Anton, Joaquin, & Lella	Iñigo, Joaquin, Lee, Miguel, & Princess	Clifford, Lella, & Rave	Lella	Caprice, Carmelle, & Joaquin	Caprice, Carmelle, Eliza, Heath, & Joaquin	Evicted (Day 99)
Eliza	Ashley, Lee, & Miguel	Anton, Carmelle, Heath, Krystal, & Marco	Evicted (Day 36)			Caprice, Carmelle, Heath, Joaquin, & Sofia	Re-evicted (Day 99)
Fred	Princess, Reich, & Waynona	Ashley, Caprice, Clifford, Lella, & Rave	Heath, Iñigo, & Lee	Princess	Ashley, Lella, & Princess	Evicted (Day 85)	
Clifford	Iñigo, Krystal, & Marco	Ashley, Caprice, Fred, Lella, & Rave	Lella, Rave, & Sofia	Carmelle	Heath, Krystal, & Miguel	Evicted (Day 85)	
Anton	Joaquin, Lella, & Sofia	Carmelle, Eliza, Heath, Krystal, & Marco	Ashley, Carmelle, & Miguel	Krystal	Evicted (Day 71)		
Rave	Caprice, Carmelle, & Heath	Ashley, Caprice, Clifford, Fred, & Lella	Clifford, Lella, & Sofia	Ashley	Evicted (Day 71)		
Iñigo	Clifford, Krystal, & Marco	Joaquin, Lee, Miguel, Princess, & Sofia	Fred, Heath, & Lee	Evicted (Day 50)			
Lee	Ashley, Eliza, & Miguel	Iñigo, Joaquin, Miguel, Princess, & Sofia	Fred, Heath, & Iñigo	Evicted (Day 50)			
Waynona	Fred, Princess, & Reich	Evicted (Day 22)					
Reich	Fred, Princess, & Waynona	Evicted (Day 22)					
Note	^{Note 1}	^{Note 2}	^{Note 3}	^{Note 4}	^{Note 5}	^{Note 6}	^{Note 7}
Ref.							

Notes

1. The task, which was called as Reverse Class Picture, challenged the housemates to avoid being photographed by Ma'am Castro, who was blindfolded. Being caught meant elimination. The goal was to be the last housemate remaining, who would then be declared the group leader. This process was repeated five times in total, establishing the following leaders: Anton, Krystal, Carmelle, Reich, and Miguel. These five leaders will then choose from the remaining housemates the members of their respective group. Anton went first, followed by Krystal, and so on, leaving Miguel with the "unchosen" housemates. Anton chose Joaquin, Sofia, and Lella; Krystal chose Iñigo, Marco, and Clifford; Carmelle chose Heath, Rave, and Caprice; Reich chose Waynona, Fred, and Princess; and Miguel got Lee, Ashley, and Eliza.
2. Housemates had to grab something from a pabitin corresponding to a straight forward instruction (grab the star-shaped item) or the answer to a Filipino question (sixty-nine minus forty-six and the Tagalog of "notebook"). There were three rounds. For the first two rounds, the six slowest housemates for each were eliminated. For the final round, the three fastest housemates received amulets and became the second set of group leaders. Unlike the first cycle, the leaders chose their members alternately.
3. Housemates had to place sticks on the back of their hand with the palm facing down. Then, they have to flip the sticks and catch them with the same hand's palm still facing downwards. Housemates had to do this once for each of the five stations within three minutes. The four housemates with the most sticks caught (time spent as tiebreaker if necessary) became the third set of group leaders. Like the second cycle, leaders chose their members alternately.
4. Heath and Miguel were automatically paired after winning the first Gift of Immunity challenge. Housemates had to answer the question "In the classic Christmas song Twelve Days of Christmas, how many gifts did the true love send on the twelfth day?" Housemates lined up to answer the question. Those who answered '78' were able to choose their duo while those who answered incorrectly went to the back of the line. The cycle repeated until only two housemates remained in line.
5. Housemates had to listen to the "Story of Miggy" and answer three questions about it. They would do so by flipping each photo card then grabbing and placing the photo card corresponding to the answer on a separate platform. They must shout the answer to get a check. They could only move on once Big Brother said so. Princess, Clifford, and Joaquin chose members alternately, with their first picks being from the other talent agency i.e. Sparkle leader chose a Star Magic housemate first and vice versa.
6. Housemates took turns throwing an object to the top of a house that is sitting on a pole. If a housemate missed, they had to wait for their turn. If not, they chose which group they would want to be part of. Each group had the same number of housemates per agency per gender. The two groups chose Ashley and Joaquin as their group leader.
7. For the final group formation, The Ultimate 8 housemates will form consisting of Big Four of two agencies by series of challenges.

== Nomination history ==
Groups or duos who received three points and one point are separated by a semi-colon, as shown in the table. Underlined names denote the intended target for that specific point, if any. Otherwise, no target was identified.

Legend and color key

Sparkle housemate
Star Magic housemate
Immune
Saved via Ligtask
Automatic nomination
Ineligible to vote

Pinoy Big Brother: Celebrity Collab Edition 2.0 nomination history
	#1	#2	#3	#4	The Big Wildcard		#5	#6	#7	Big Night	Nominations received
Eviction day and date	Day 22 November 15	Day 36 November 29	Day 50 December 13	Day 71 January 3	Day 79 January 11	Days 81–82 January 13–14	Day 85 January 17	Day 99 January 31	Day 120 February 21	Day 127 February 28	Nominations received
Nomination day and date	Day 16; November 9	Day 30; November 23	Day 44; December 7	Day 65; December 28	Day 72; January 4	Day 79; January 11	Day 79; January 11	Day 93; January 25	Day 114; February 15	Day 121; February 22	Nominations received
Caprice	Same vote as Carmelle	Anton, Carmelle, Eliza, Heath, Krystal, & Marco	Same vote as Princess	Fred & Princess; Ashley & Rave	No nominations	No nominations	Saved	Nominated	Finalist	Winner	7 (+1)
Lella	Same vote as Anton	Anton, Carmelle, Eliza, Heath, Krystal, & Marco	Same vote as Rave	Fred & Princess; Ashley & Rave	No nominations	No nominations	No nominations	Saved	Finalist	Winner	4
Heath	Same vote as Carmelle	Not eligible	Same vote as Fred	Fred & Princess; Ashley & Rave	No nominations	No nominations	Nominated	Nominated	Nominated	Runner-up	19 (+3)
Krystal	Fred, Princess, Reich & Waynona; Anton, Joaquin, Lella & Sofia	Not eligible	Same vote as Princess	Same vote as Anton	No nominations	No nominations	Nominated	Saved	Finalist	Runner-up	13 (+1)
Ashley	Same vote as Miguel	Anton, Carmelle, Eliza, Heath, Krystal, & Marco	Same vote as Anton	Fred & Princess; Anton & Krystal	No nominations	No nominations	Nominated	Saved	Finalist	3rd place	11 (+1)
Joaquin	Same vote as Anton	Not eligible	Same vote as Princess	Same vote as Caprice	No nominations	No nominations	Saved	Nominated	Nominated	3rd place	7 (+2)
Miguel	Fred, Princess, Reich & Waynona; Anton, Joaquin, Lella & Sofia	Not eligible	Same vote as Anton	Same vote as Heath	No nominations	No nominations	Nominated	Saved	Nominated	4th place	4 (+2)
Princess	Same vote as Reich	Not eligible	Fred, Heath, Iñigo & Lee; Anton, Ashley, Carmelle & Miguel	Same vote as Fred	No nominations	No nominations	No nominations	Saved	Nominated	4th place	31 (+1)
Carmelle	Fred, Princess, Reich & Waynona; Anton, Joaquin, Lella & Sofia	Not eligible	Same vote as Anton	Fred & Princess; Ashley & Rave	No nominations	No nominations	Saved	Nominated	Nominated	Evicted (Day 120)	15 (+2)
Marco	Same vote as Krystal	Not eligible	Evicted (Day 36)			Nominated	Exempt	Saved	Nominated	Re-evicted (Day 120)	6 (+2)
Sofia	Same vote as Anton	Not eligible	Same vote as Rave	Same vote as Lella	No nominations	No nominations	Saved	Nominated	Evicted (Day 99)		4 (+1)
Eliza	Same vote as Miguel	Not eligible	Evicted (Day 36)			Nominated	Exempt	Nominated	Re-evicted (Day 99)		6 (+2)
Fred	Same vote as Reich	Anton, Carmelle, Eliza, Heath, Krystal, & Marco	Anton, Ashley, Carmelle & Miguel; Caprice, Joaquin, Krystal & Princess	Anton & Krystal; Carmelle & Clifford	No nominations	No nominations	Nominated	Evicted (Day 85)			37 (+1)
Clifford	Same vote as Krystal	Anton, Carmelle, Eliza, Heath, Krystal, & Marco	Same vote as Rave	Same vote as Carmelle	No nominations	No nominations	Nominated	Evicted (Day 85)			1 (+1)
Anton	Fred, Princess, Reich & Waynona; Caprice, Carmelle, Heath & Rave	Not eligible	Fred, Heath, Iñigo & Lee; Caprice, Joaquin, Krystal & Princess	Ashley & Rave; Fred & Princess	Evicted (Day 71)	Nominated	Re-evicted (Day 82)				18 (+1)
Rave	Same vote as Carmelle	Anton, Carmelle, Eliza, Heath, Krystal, & Marco	Fred, Heath, Iñigo & Lee; Caprice, Joaquin, Krystal & Princess	Same vote as Ashley	Evicted (Day 71)	Nominated	Re-evicted (Day 81)				11 (+1)
Iñigo	Same vote as Krystal	Not eligible	Same vote as Fred	Evicted (Day 50)							9
Lee	Same vote as Miguel	Not eligible	Same vote as Fred	Evicted (Day 50)							9
Waynona	Same vote as Reich	Evicted (Day 22)									12
Reich	Caprice, Carmelle, Heath & Rave; Anton, Joaquin, Lella & Sofia	Evicted (Day 22)									12
Notes	^{Note} ^{1}	^{Note} ^{2}	^{Note} ^{3}	^{Notes} ^{4}^{,} ^{5}^{, and} ^{6}	^{Notes} ^{7}^{and} ^{8}		^{Note} ^{9}	^{Note} ^{10}	^{Notes} ^{11}^{,}^{12}^{, and} ^{13}	^{Note} ^{14}	
Ligtask winners	Ashley, Eliza, Lee, & Miguel	Ashley, Caprice, Clifford, Fred, Lella, & Rave	None				Caprice, Carmelle, Joaquin, & Sofia	Ashley, Krystal, Lella, Marco, Miguel, & Princess	None		
Up for eviction	Princess; Waynona Fred; Reich	Anton; Heath; Marco Carmelle; Eliza; Krystal	Heath; Lee Fred; Iñigo	Anton; Ashley; Princess Fred; Krystal; Rave	Anton; Lee; Marco; Waynona Eliza; Iñigo; Rave; Reich	Anton; Marco Eliza; Rave	Ashley; Clifford; Heath Fred; Krystal; Miguel	Caprice; Heath; Sofia Carmelle; Eliza; Joaquin	Heath; Marco; Princess Carmelle; Joaquin; Miguel	Open Voting	
Saved from eviction	Princess; 56.94% Fred; 88.31%	Heath; 67.78% Anton; 17.37% Krystal; 48.82% Carmelle; 26.99%	Heath; 84.41% Fred; 59.48%	Princess; 40.61% Ashley; 31.13% Krystal; 35.27% Fred; 33.92%	Marco; 46.46% Anton; 43.38% Rave; 39.48% Eliza; 35.47%	Marco; Won Re-entry into game Eliza; Won Re-entry into game	Heath; 47.87% Ashley; 27.96% Krystal; 39.57% Miguel; 35.20%	Caprice; 51.62% Heath; 39.92% Joaquin; 45.70% Carmelle; 33.33%	Heath; 47.57% Princess; 30.96% Miguel; 38.42% Joaquin; 36.85%	Caprice; 61.78% Lella; 53.63%	
Evicted	Waynona; 43.06% Reich; 11.69%	Marco; 14.85% Eliza; 24.19%	Lee; 15.59% Iñigo; 40.52%	Anton; 28.27% Rave; 30.82%	Waynona; 7.49% Lee; 2.66% Iñigo; 24.42% Reich; 0.63%	Anton; Lost Challenge Rave; Lost Challenge	Clifford; 24.17% Fred; 25.23%	Sofia; 8.46% Eliza; 20.97%	Marco; 21.47% Carmelle; 24.73%	Heath; 24.25% Ashley; 8.47% Princess; 5.50% Krystal; 22.26% Joaquin; 16.95% Miguel; 7.16%	
Ref.											

Notes

1. Fred got the highest percentage of votes during an eviction night in the franchise's history with 88.31% of the public's votes, surpassing Megan Young's votes of 87.89% in Celebrity Edition 2.
2. The winners of the Ligtask individually cast their vote (1 point) on which group to be up for eviction at the Confession Room. Afterwards, Big Brother instructed them to individually state the reason for nomination in front of the chosen group.
3. Following multiple violations committed by the housemates, Big Brother decided to forgo the Ligtask for the week, rendering all groups vulnerable to nomination.
4. Heath and Miguel were immune for this nomination round after they won the endurance challenge. Thus, they are automatically paired for this round.
5. Caprice and Joaquin were immune for this nomination round after they got the highest percentage of votes for the second Gift of Immunity challenge.
6. For this nomination round, each duo must cast their vote same from the previous edition. However, the voting process was still applied separately for Kapuso and Kapamilya housemates.
7. For this wildcard, the two housemates with the highest number of votes from each agency faced a head-to-head challenge to re-enter the house. In the end, Eliza won over Rave for Kapamilya, while Marco won over Anton for Kapuso, securing their comeback as official housemates.
8. Public voting for the "Big Wildcard" twist, conducted via Maya, concluded on Day 78. The results, announced on Day 79.
9. Clifford, Heath, Krystal, and Miguel were automatically nominated after they finished last on third Ligtask challenge. The second place were chosen by the Ligtask winners to save one housemate per agency. The Ligtask winner chose to save Lella and Princess from nomination. Hence, Ashley and Fred were automatically nominated.
10. For the sixth nomination round, two groups competed against each other in three Ligtask challenges. Striving Feathers, composed of Ashley, Krystal, Lella, Marco, Miguel, and Princess, earned the most points across the three challenges, making them automatically safe from nomination. On the other hand, Solid Six, composed of Caprice, Carmelle, Eliza, Heath, Joaquin, and Sofia, earned the fewest points and were therefore automatically nominated.
11. The first Big Jump Challenge was contested by the Big Ticket recipients: Joaquin and Lella for Kapamilya, and Caprice and Marco for Kapuso. Lella and Caprice won the challenge, securing their spots in the Ultimate 8.
12. The second Big Jump Challenge were determined between the top three housemates by endurance challenge. Joaquin, Krystal, and Miguel competed for Kapamilya, while Ashley, Marco, and Princess competed for Kapuso. In the end, Ashley and Krystal won the challenge, securing their spots in the Ultimate 8.
13. The remaining two Big Four spot each agency were determined by public vote.
14. For the Big Night, unlimited voting was implemented to determine the winners of this edition.

=== Gift of Immunity aka Big Intensity Challenge voting ===
Gift of Immunity aka Big Intensity Challenge voting
	#1	#2
Voting starts	Day 54; December 17	Day 59; December 22
Voting ends	Day 57; December 20	Day 64; December 27
Anton	3	Eligible
Ashley	5	Eligible
Caprice	13	Eligible
Carmelle	5	Eligible
Clifford	13	Eligible
Fred	4	Eligible
Heath	13	Immune
Joaquin	5	Eligible
Krystal	8	Eligible
Lella	13	Eligible
Miguel	11	Immune
Princess	2	Eligible
Rave	10	Eligible
Sofia	7	Eligible
Eligible for Immunity	~~Caprice~~; Clifford; Heath; Sofia ~~Krystal~~; Lella; Miguel; Rave	Anton & Krystal; Ashley & Rave; Caprice & Joaquin; Carmelle & Clifford; Fred & Princess; Lella & Sofia
Voting result	Clifford; 65,570 votes Sofia; 35,140 votes Lella; 51,550 votes Rave; 25,200 votes	Fred & Princess; 15.33% Ashley & Rave; 11.30% Anton & Krystal; 4.72% Lella & Sofia; 3.66% Carmelle & Clifford; 3.13%
Immuned	Heath Miguel	Caprice & Joaquin; 61.86%
Notes	^{Notes} ^{1}^{,} ^{2} ^{and} ^{3}	^{Note} ^{4}

Notes

1. The housemates cast their votes for the four nicest housemates, two each from both agencies. The four highest number of votes were allowed to win the immunity challenge aka Big Intensity Challenge.
2. Caprice and Krystal were initially eliminated after they ranked last on the first challenge.
3. Public voting opened immediately for the second and third-ranked housemates, as both talent agencies still had a chance to get an advantage for the endurance challenge until noon of December 20 (Day 57).
4. Public voting opened for the duo that will receive another gift of immunity aka Big Intensity Challenge. The remaining duos will face the fourth nomination round.

=== Big Ticket voting ===
On Day 100, the remaining ten housemates were casting one vote each from both agencies including themselves for who deserves a Big Ticket for give an opportunity to the Big Jump Challenge. Italic text indicates casting a vote for itself.

Big Ticket voting
Housemate	Voted for...	Total Votes
Ashley	Caprice; Lella	2
Caprice	Heath; Carmelle	4
Carmelle	Caprice; Carmelle	3
Heath	Caprice; Lella	2
Joaquin	Caprice; Lella	1
Krystal	Ashley; Miguel	0
Lella	Princess; Lella	5
Marco	Marco; Joaquin	1
Miguel	Heath; Lella	1
Princess	Ashley; Carmelle	1
Big Ticket recipient	Caprice Lella	

== The Big Night ==
The two-hour season finale, titled The Big Night, aired on February 28 at The Crossroad Center in Mother Ignacia Avenue, Quezon City, with a special timeslot running from 7:15 p.m. to 9:15 p.m.

The Ultimate 8 faced the public vote to determine the Ultimate Big Winners, with the public allowed to cast their unlimited votes to save through Maya.

The Kapuso and Kapamilya housemate that got the highest combined votes, from the public and with the votes that they got from the One Million Votes Challenge, were declared as the Ultimate Big Winners of the season.

The big winners per talent agency received ₱1,000,000 each, while the second, third, and fourth big placers per talent agency received ₱500,000, ₱300,000, and ₱200,000 each respectively.

The event was held at the Crossroads Center in Quezon City, featuring performances and appearances from a number of Pinoy Big Brother personalities and artists. The lineup included Gen 11 Big winner Fyang Smith, Celebrity Collab Edition Kapuso 3rd Big Placer Charlie Fleming, Gen 11 4th Big Placer Kai Montinola, and former housemates JM Ibarra of Gen 11 and Kyle Echarri of Kumunity Season 10. P-pop groups BGYO and Cloud 7 also performed, alongside other former housemates from the season.

Many firsts in the show's history happened during this season's big night: A task held live inside the Big Brother house, moments before the housemates get out ahead to the venue, as well as the Ultimate 8 faced the public before the announcement of the winners.

Day 127: Kapuso Big Winner Vote
Housemate		Percentage of Votes	Result
A	Caprice	61.78%	Kapuso Big Winner
B	Heath	24.25%	Kapuso 2nd Big Placer
C	Princess	5.50%	Kapuso 4th Big Placer
D	Ashley	8.47%	Kapuso 3rd Big Placer
Total Votes		100%	—N/a

Day 127: Kapamilya Big Winner Vote
Housemate		Percentage of Votes	Result
E	Miguel	7.16%	Kapamilya 4th Big Placer
F	Lella	53.63%	Kapamilya Big Winner
G	Krystal	22.26%	Kapamilya 2nd Big Placer
H	Joaquin	16.95%	Kapamilya 3rd Big Placer
Total Votes		100%	—N/a

== Production ==
=== Development ===
During the finale of Pinoy Big Brother: Celebrity Collab Edition on July 5, 2025, Bianca Gonzalez confirmed that the collaboration between ABS-CBN and GMA Network, together with the program's "duo format", would continue for a second season. In late September 2025, teasers for a forthcoming season began appearing on the reality show's official Facebook page, featuring the subtitle "2.0". On September 29, the new installment was formally confirmed on the news program 24 Oras, with the premiere date set for October 25.

=== Theme ===
Like the preceding season, the season features artists from Star Magic and Sparkle GMA Artist Center. However, for this season, the cast would be composed of teen stars and "Gen Z" artists. The season used a new rendition of "Kabataang Pinoy" (transl. Filipino Youth), the show's theme song used for teen editions as its main theme, sang by P-pop boy groups BGYO and Cloud 7.

Meanwhile, the official eviction song for this edition is titled "Sa Isang Kisap" performed by PBB ex-housemate Klarisse de Guzman.

=== Hosts ===
On October 20, GMA Network confirmed that all hosts from the previous season—Bianca Gonzalez, Robi Domingo, Kim Chiu, Melai Cantiveros, Enchong Dee, Alexa Ilacad, Gabbi Garcia, and Mavy Legaspi—would return for the season, being joined by an undisclosed "original host" who would be making an "exclusive comeback" on the show. On the premiere night, Luis Manzano was revealed to be the returning addition, marking his return to the show since Teen Edition Plus in 2008.

== Release ==
Pinoy Big Brother: Celebrity Collab Edition 2.0. premiered on GMA Network on October 25, 2025, with a new episode being aired daily thereafter. Two companion shows support the show: Updates and OnlineVerse, both carrying over from the previous season. The season also airs on the digital streaming services of ABS-CBN and GMA, including Kapamilya Online Live, iWant, and Kapuso Stream.

== Ratings ==
According to AGB Nielsen Philippines' Nationwide Urban Television Audience Measurement People in television homes, the pilot episode of Pinoy Big Brother: Celebrity Collab Edition 2.0 earned an 8.0% rating, 0.6% lower than its predecessor's rating in its pilot episode. The final episode scored a 10.8% rating, 0.3% higher than previous edition.

== Notable events ==
In an episode aired on December 8, 2025, concerns were raised over remarks made by certain male housemates toward female housemates, which some viewers perceived as inappropriate or sexually suggestive. Following each episode, the show releases data on peak concurrent viewership and trending topics on its official social media accounts. However, in the post dated December 9, 2025, the list of trending topics was omitted despite ongoing online discussions related to the episode. This prompted some viewers to raise concerns and call the attention of the show’s female hosts and the women’s organization Gabriela.

As a result to the numerous complaints of the public regarding the issue and other concerns within the show, the Movie and Television Review and Classification Board or MTRCB conducted a preliminary conference on December 18, 2025. And with the production team of the show and the officials of the board, they discussed and addressed the complaints and even suggest different measures to ensure the protection and welfare, not just for the housemates but also for the viewers, especially their younger audiences.

== Notes ==
Preceded by Pinoy Big Brother: Celebrity Collab Edition	Pinoy Big Brother: Celebrity Collab Edition 2.0; October 25, 2025 – February 28, 2026	Succeeded by Pinoy Big Brother: Collab 3.0
