= Cloud 7 (group) =

Filipino boy band

CLOUD 7
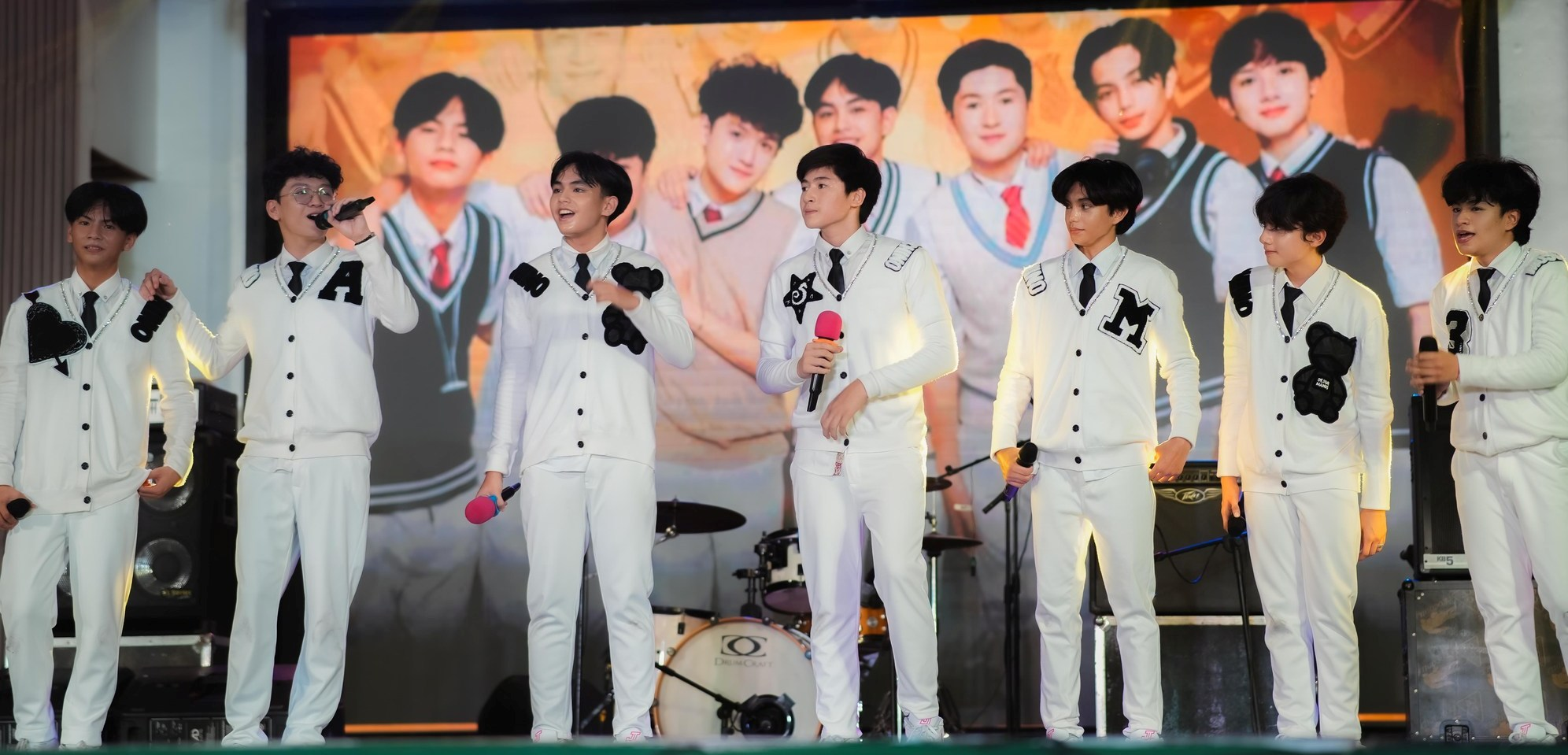
- CLOUD 7 in 2024 (left to right): Fian, Kairo, Lukas, Egypt, PJ, Migz, and Johann

Background information
- Origin: Philippines
- Genre: Pinoy pop
- Years active: 2023–present
- Label: Sparkle
- Members: Lukas Garcia; Johann Nepomuceno; Kairo Lazarte; Egypt See; Migz Diokno; PJ Yago; Fian Guevarra

Cloud 7 (stylized in all caps) is a Filipino boy band formed in 2023 by Sparkle GMA Artist Center. The group is composed of seven members: Lukas Garcia, Johann Nepomuceno, Kairo Lazarte, Egypt See, Migz Diokno, PJ Yago, and Fian Guevarra. They are recognized as the youngest P-pop group under the Sparkle management roster.

== History ==
=== 2023–2024: Formation ===
Cloud 7 made their initial debut on August 20, 2023. Following their formation, the group released four singles titled "Silipin Ang Mundo," "Louder," "Tayo Na," and "Tara Na." In 2024, the group participated in the "Signed for Stardom" event, where they officially signed contracts with Sparkle GMA Artist Center. Later that year, the group members were introduced as student ambassadors for AMA University and released a collaborative promotional single for the institution titled "Choose to be the Best."

=== 2025: Official launch ===
The group held their official media launch on May 23, 2025. The event was hosted by Rain Matienzo and attended by GMA Network executives, including Annette Gozon-Valdes. During this event, they performed their previous single "Tara Na" and a new song titled "Bara Bara." The single "Bara Bara" was officially released on May 30, 2025. The group described the song as a message about taking pride in one's skills and hard work.

In June 2025, Cloud 7 appeared at the Billboard Philippines P-pop Rising Class Party held in Makati, Philippines. In the same month, they starred in a digital video series titled Sparkle Presents: Up, Up, and Away. The series was released on social media platforms and featured interviews with the members.

In October 2025, the group collaborated with BGYO to perform the song "Kabataang Pinoy" at the launch of Pinoy Big Brother: Celebrity Collab Edition 2.0. The rendition served as the theme song for the reality show's season and was produced by Jonathan Manalo.

== Artistry ==
=== Name and fandom ===
The name "Cloud 7" was inspired by the phrase "Cloud 9," which represents happiness. The number was changed to seven to reflect the number of members in the group. Their fan base is called "Rainbow." The group stated that rainbows appear with clouds, and each member represents a specific color of the rainbow. For example, the leader Lukas Garcia represents the color green, while Egypt See represents red.

=== Influences ===
The members have cited fellow P-pop group SB19 as their role models. They have also stated they wish to pursue acting in the future, with interests in musical dramas and action projects.

== Members ==
The group consists of seven members aged between 13 and 19 at the time of their 2025 launch.

- Lukas Garcia (Julijo Lukas Garcia) – Leader and main visual
- Johann Nepomuceno (Prince Johann Nepomuceno) – Main vocalist
- Kairo Lazarte – Lead dancer
- Egypt See (Egypt Larkin See) – Vocalist
- Migz Diokno (Miguel Gabriel Diokno) – Main dancer
- PJ Yago (Prince Johan Yago) – Lead vocalist
- Fian Guevarra (Fian Andrei Guevarra) – Main rapper and youngest member

== Discography ==
=== Singles ===
- "Silipin Ang Mundo"
- "Louder"
- "Tayo Na"
- "Tara Na"
- "Bara Bara" (2025)
- "Kabataang Pinoy" (with BGYO) (2025)
- "Six7" (2026)

=== Promotional singles ===
- "Choose to be the Best" (for AMA University) (2024)

== Filmography ==
=== Television ===
| Year | Title | Role | Notes | Ref. |
|---|---|---|---|---|
| 2024 | Unang Hirit | Themselves | Guest performers | |
| 2024 | All-Out Sundays | Themselves | Guest performers | |
| 2025 | Pinoy Big Brother: Celebrity Collab Edition 2.0 | Themselves | Guest performers (Launch night) | |

=== Online series ===
| Year | Title | Platform | Ref. |
|---|---|---|---|
| 2025 | Sparkle Presents: Up, Up, and Away | Social Media | |

== Awards and nominations ==
Name of the award ceremony, year presented, category, nominee of the award, and the result of the nomination
| Award ceremony | Year | Category | Nominee / Work | Result | Ref. |
|---|---|---|---|---|---|
| VP Choice Awards | 2026 | Rising P-pop Group | Cloud 7 | Nominated | |
