= YGIG =

Filipino girl group

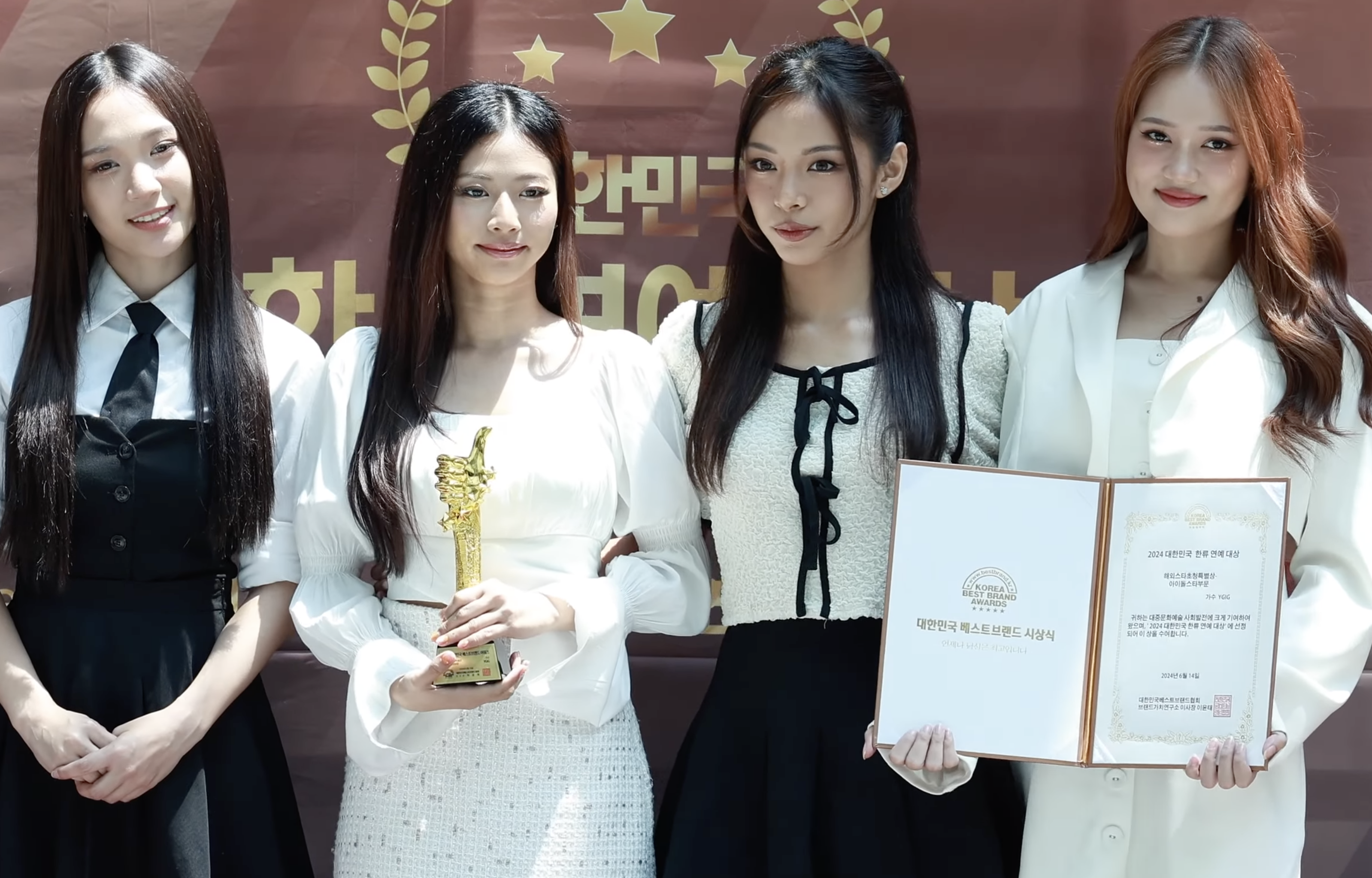
- YGIG in 2024 (left to right): Jewel, Vien, Maeg, and Hazelyn

Background information
- Origin: Manila, Philippines
- Genre: P-pop
- Years active: 2022–present
- Labels: SBTown, Universal Records
- Members: Vien; Maeg; Jewel; Hazelyn
- Past members: Darlene; JM; Alexei

YGIG /Y·G·I·G/ (You Go, I Go) is a Filipino girl group under SBTown. The members consist of Vien, Jewel, Hazelyn, and Maeg. They made their official debut on November 25, 2022 with their first single Shaba Shaba. YGIG aims to represent the Filipino female groups in the international scene.

== History ==
=== 2022–present: debut, activities ===
Almost 20,000 girls auditioned for a girl group project organized by Show Biz Town (SBTown), SB19's former agency, in collaboration with Universal Records. Alexei, Maeg, JM, Vien, Darlene, Hazelyn, and Jewel were announced as their final line-up. The members came from different places and backgrounds; for instance, Alexei had to move from Cebu to Manila to commit to her idol dreams, Vien was from Malabon, Hazelyn hailed from Pampanga, while Jewel used to live in the United States. The group was given the name YGIG (You Go, I Go). They debuted in November 2022 with the song "Shaba, Shaba", with lyrics written by the members themselves.

In May 2024, YGIG and their brother group Pluus simultaneously released self-written singles with the same name, "Universe". While Pluus' "Universe" is an upbeat disco-influenced dance-pop song, YGIG's "Universe" is a softer pop track incorporating dancehall beats.

== Members ==
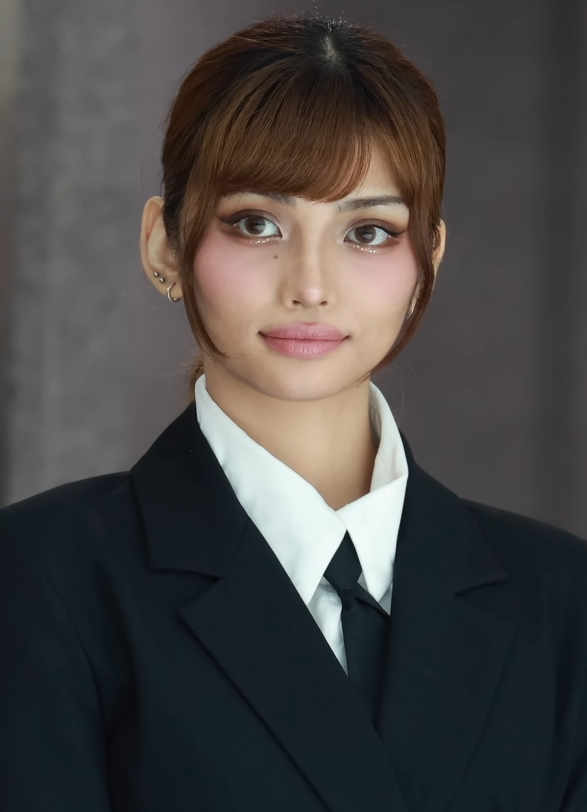
Former member Alexei Abella

Current

- Hazelyn
- Jewel
- Maeg
- Vien – leader

Former

- Darlene (2022–2023)
- JM (2022–2024)
- Alexei (2022-2025)

== Discography ==
=== Mini Album ===
Title	Album Details
YLGOIVGE	Released: July 21 2023 (PH); Label: Universal Records; Format: CD, digital download, streaming; Track listing: 1. "Doob Doob"; 2. "Touchdown"; 3. "Shaba Shaba"; 4. "BB"; 5. "IDKY"

=== Singles ===
Title	Year	Album	Ref.
"Shaba Shaba"	2022	YLGOIVGE	
"Doob Doob"	2023	YLGOIVGE	
"Touchdown"	2023	YLGOIVGE	
"BB"	2023	YLGOIVGE	
"IDKY"	2023	YLGOIVGE	
"Universe"	2024		
"Chicka-chick-a"	2025		
"Lyk That"	2025		
"Perfect Blue"	2026		
"Good to Go"	2026		
Collaboration
"Maligaya Ang Pasko" (PLUUS)	2023		

== Filmography ==
=== Television shows ===
Year	Month/Date	Program	Network	Ref.
2023	July 9	ASAP	ABS-CBN	
2023	August 03	Unang Hirit	GMA	
2023	August 20	I Can See Your Voice	ABS-CBN	
2023	September 14	CNN Philippines	CNN	
2023	October 1	All Out Sunday	GMA	
2023	October 08	All Out Sunday	GMA	
2023	November 19	ASAP	ABS-CBN	

== Videography ==
=== Music videos ===
List of music videos, showing year released, and directors
Title	Year	Director(s)	Length	Ref.
"Shaba Shaba"	2022	JC Gellidon	3:07	
"Doob Doob"	2023	Yang Woong Jin	3:23	
"Touchdown"	2023	Yang Woong Jin	3:39	
"BB"	2023	Yang Woong Jin	3:56	
"IDKY"	2023	Yang Woong Jin	3:40	
"Maligaya Ang Pasko"	2023	Marc Dabatian, Geong Seong Han	3:47	
"Universe"	2024	N/A	3:26	
"Chicka-chick-a"	2025	Jonathan Tal Placido	4:04	

== Concerts and live performances ==
Standalone Concert
Event name	Dates	Venue	Location	Ref.
YGIG 1st Comeback Concert; Green Light: Going All the Way	August 06, 2023	SM North Edsa SkyDome	Quezon City	

Concert Participation
Event name	Dates	Venue	Location	Ref.
Manila K-Town Water Concert!	April 30, 2023	Remedios Circle	Malate, Manila	

=== Fan Meetings ===
Event name	Dates	Venue	Location	Ref.
HEARTSTRUCK 1st Official WeGo Meeting	February 18, 2023	Globe Auditorium Maybank Theater, BGC	Taguig	

=== Mall shows ===
Event	Date	Venue	Location	Ref.
WEGO SUM-All Tour	April 29, 2023	Water Garden, Festival Mall Alabang	Muntinlupa	
WEGO SUM-All Tour	May 28, 2023	Robinsons Imus	Cavite	
WEGO SUM-All Tour	June 3, 2023	Centrio Mall	Cagayan De Oro	
WEGO SUM-All Tour	June 10, 2023	Robinsons Dasmariñas	Dasma, Cavite	
WEGO SUM-All Tour	June 11, 2023	Robinsons Mall Galleria South	San Pedro, Laguna	
WEGO SUM-All Tour	June 17, 2023	Robinsons Sta. Rosa	Laguna	
WEGO SUM-All Tour	June 24 2023	SM City Cebu	Cebu	
WEGO SUM-All Tour	June 18, 2023	Robinsons Las Piñas	Mentro Manila	
WEGO SUM-All Tour	July 1, 2023	Robinsons General Trias	Cavite	
WEGO SUM-All Tour	July 9, 2023	Robinsons Lipa	Batangas	
WEGO SUM-All Tour	August 13, 2023	Fisher Mall Malabon	Malabon	
WEGO SUM-All Tour	August 20, 2023	Fisher Mall Quezon Avenue	Quezon City	
WEGO SUM-All Tour	October 14, 2023	SM City Olongapo Central	Olongapo	
WEGO SUM-All Tour	November 18, 2023	Robinsons Antipolo	Antipolo	
WEGO SUM-All Tour	November 19, 2023	SM City Pampanga	Pampanga	

== Awards and nominations ==
Name of the award ceremony, year presented, category, nominee of the award, and the result of the nomination
Award ceremony	Year	Category	Nominee / Work	Result	Ref.
Awit Awards	2023	Best Performance by a New Group Recording Artist	YGIG	Nominated	
Music Rank Asian Choice Awards	2023	Asian New Artist	YGIG	Nominated	
RAWR Awards	2023	Favorite Group	YGIG	Nominated	
PPOP Awards 2023	2023	Philippine Pop New Girl Group of the Year	YGIG	Nominated	
The New Hue VMA 2023	2023	Best New Artist	YGIG	Nominated	
