= New Id =

Filipino boy band

New:Id
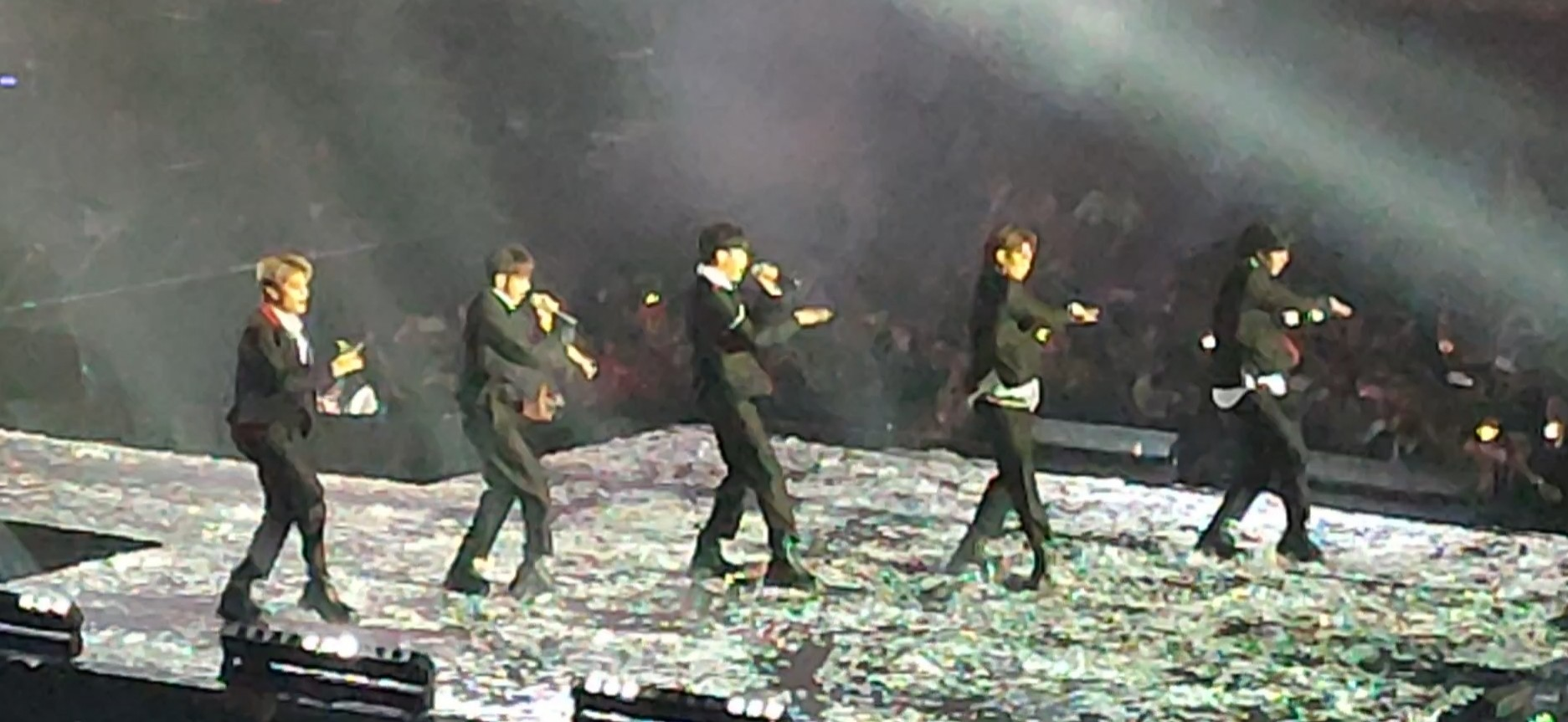
- New:Id in 2023 (From Left to Right: Thad, L, Macky, Jom, and Wilson)

Background information
- Origin: Manila, Philippines
- Genre: P-pop
- Years active: 2024–2026
- Label: MLD Entertainment
- Past members: Wilson; Macky; L; Thad; Jom

New:Id (Korean: 뉴이드; RR: Nyuideu; stylized as New:ID was a Filipino boy band formed in 2023 by MLD Entertainment. The group was composed of five members: Wilson, Macky, L, Thad, and Jom. They debuted on July 25, 2024, with the EP New Ego.

== Career ==
=== 2022–2023: Pre-debut activities and formation ===
On September 7, 2022, executives from ABS-CBN, MLD Entertainment, and Kamp Global signed a deal to debut a Filipino boy band in South Korea. The lineup of the boy band was determined through the reality survival show Dream Maker, which saw 62 contestants compete to become part of the band. At the end of the series' run, seven contestants were selected to form the lineup of Hori7on, which debuted on July 24, 2023.

On April 23, 2023, MLD Entertainment announced that losing contestants Wilson Budoy, Macky Tuason, Josh Labing-isa, Thad Sune, and Jom Aceron, had signed with the agency as trainees. In an interview with the entertainment website Kpopmap, MLD Entertainment CEO Lee Hyung-jin revealed that the quintet, then tentatively named as New MLD Boys, are preparing for a debut in South Korea before then "engaging in active promotions in the Philippines".

The members of New:Id were featured on duets with the members of the Hori7on on their debut album, Friend-Ship. In the accompanying concert for the album, Voyage To Manila, the quintet was formally introduced in their performance of a Filipino version of the 2012 DMTN single "E.R.", taken from the EP State of Emergency. The social media accounts for the group were launched three days later, on September 13.

Ahead of their official debut, the quintet released "E.R." as a pre-debut promotional single on September 22.

=== 2024–present: Debut ===
They debuted on July 25, 2024, with the EP New Ego, led by the single, Ghost.

== Members ==
- Wilson – vocalist, dancer
- Macky – vocalist, rapper
- L – vocalist
- Thad – leader, rapper, dancer
- Jom – dancer, rapper

== Discography ==
=== Extended plays (EPs) ===
- New Ego (2024)

=== Singles ===
List of singles, showing year released, and name of the album
Title	Year	Album	Ref
"Déjà Vu"	2023	Non-album singles	
"E.R"	2023	Non-album singles	
"Ghost"	2024	New Ego	
"The Day We Meet Again (Tagalog Version)"	2024	New Ego	
