= Safety Zone =

Safety Zone may refer to:

- Safety Zone (album), a 1975 album by Bobby Womack
- "Safety Zone" (song), a 2013 song by DMTN
- "Safety Zone", a 2022 song by J-Hope from Jack in the Box
- Nanking Safety Zone, a former demilitarized zone in China
