= Be The Next: 9 Dreamers =

Filipino-South Korean reality talent competition

- Title card
- Also known as: Be The Next
- Genre: Reality show
- Created by: Dongmyung Lee; Ryan Evangelista
- Written by: Darwin M. Guevarra; Margaux Apellido; Andy Tejada
- Directed by: Kiko Meily; Ryan Evangelista (February 8, 2025–April 26, 2025); Nico Faustino (April 27, 2025–May 10, 2025)
- Presented by: Sandara Park (2NE1)
- Country of origin: Philippines
- Original languages: English; Filipino; Korean
- No. of seasons: 1
- No. of episodes: 27

Production
- Executive producers: Eric Seo; Nina Tay; Unikka Stephanie Padilla (February 8, 2025)
- Producers: Dongmyung Lee; Jongwook Son; Jaehu Oh; Hyoungjin Lee; Jane J Basas; Guido R. Zaballero
- Production companies: TV5 Network Inc.; MLD Entertainment; Artsro; DNM Entertainment

Original release
- Network: TV5
- Release: February 8 – May 10, 2025

Related
- Dream Maker

Be The Next: 9 Dreamers (Korean: 비더넥스트 9 드리머스 ; also known as Be The Next) was a Philippine-South Korean boy group survival reality show. The show premiered on TV5 on February 8, 2025. The show concluded on May 10, 2025, with a total of 27 episodes. This was the second reality competition produced by MLD Entertainment in the Philippines after Dream Maker in 2022.

== Overview ==
=== Premise ===
The format is similar to the South Korean survival show franchise Produce 101, where hopefuls will undergo rigorous training to debut as professional talents and performers. 75 Dreamers will compete for the to spots, who will be trained and debut in South Korea, and will be launched as a global P-pop group.

=== Development ===
On August 24, 2024, a press conference and contract signing between TV5, MLD Entertainment, and KAMP Global was held announcing a Filipino idol survival show with auditions happening around the globe. Auditions were open for males aged 15 to 24 who are talented in singing, dancing, or rapping. It was held in multiple Ayala Malls within the month.

== Cast ==
On January 10, 2025, it was announced that Sandara Park of 2NE1 would serve as the program’s Dream Weaver, acting as the main host who introduced missions and guided the contestants throughout the competition.

Throughout the show, MLD Entertainment artists NEW:ID and HORI7ON made special appearances to interact with and guide the trainees. Notably, Thad of NEW:ID hosted the MV Challenge Song Selection, while Vinci of HORI7ON hosted the Mission 2 Song Selection in addition to his mentoring role.

Main host (Dream Weaver)

- Sandara Park

Special hosts

- Vinci of Hori7on
- Thad of New Id

Mentors

- Chen of EXO
- Bang Ye-dam (Excluding Mission 2)
- Hyebin of Momoland
- Park Woo-jin
- Vinci of Hori7on
- Bull$eye
- Bae Wan Hee
- Han Seo-yoon (Mission 2 and Finals)

== Contestants ==
The 75 contestants were first announced on the social media accounts of Be The Next.

Color key

Final members of the debut group
Contestants eliminated in the final episode
Contestants eliminated in the second elimination round
Contestants eliminated in the first elimination round
Contestants that left the show

75 contestants
Yunho (Jang Yun-ho)	Yohan Mesa	Ivan (Park Yoo-sung)	Tehll Mallari	Zor de Zilva
Smileone (Zin Oo Thaw)	Francis Adaya	Gelo Mendoza	Dylan Burton	Calix Luha
Davey Dalman	Jacob Alcaraz	Jeypi Funtanar	Kenshin Tatad	Kylex Bandal
Lanz Muñoz	Ram Bayudan	Rawn Castillo	Yein Liwanag	Zo Famularcano
Adrian Adesas	Aian Dohello	AJ Colico	Ally Saloritos	Anton Posadas
Bren Centeno	Cali de Guzman	Cody Esca	Greg Rafael	Harry (AJ Harry)
Jay de Luna	Jarred Mangalus	Kelvin Tran	Kien Artezuela	Kristoff Molina
Kyeo de Ocampo	Lem Malubay	Leo (Nathaniel Leonard)	Prince Suzuki	Q (Thakon Pankaeo)
Richard Azarcon	Rov Tabucol	Vi (Vincent Miguel)	Wave Bantillan	Alex Azucena
Ash Conde	Cal Mendoza	Dree Pañaredondo	Elo Nerona	Georgy Sim
Gian Samante	Hart Sanchez	Hayami Blanco	Hiro Kiyono	Jayson Villareal
Jelord Laranang	Juancho Gerona	Kai Henry	Kairo Destajo	Karl del Rosario
Kylo Talao	K.O. (Suttipat Buranatrevedh)	Marco Conjurado	Matty Lim	Paul Vizcarra
Perfect (Techatthanat Rungchareonkit)	Rafael Laxina	Sam Miras	Seb Katipunan	Steel Macabanti
Vynz Bonggao	Yannie Nocillado	Drei Ferrer	Sandie Gavito	Vhinz Bacungan

== Mission ==
Voting mechanics
- Scores of 50% will come from Mentors and 50% from global fan votes.
- Voting was set online through voting cycles at B.Stage app or bethenext.stage.in.
- Voting is free but limited to 10 votes per day.

=== Level Test: Mentor's Evaluation ===
The Dreamers will perform individually in front of the Mentors. After each performance, the Mentors will comment and provide feedback on each performance and each Mentor will give points to each of the Dreamers. The maximum points possible for a Dreamer to earn from each Mentor is 100, for a maximum possible score of 700 points for each contestant. This point system will form the basis of their ranks. If the succeeding Dreamer gets a higher rank than the Dreamer sitting, he will be bumping off other Dreamers based on the order of rank.

- Mentor's Evaluation final ranking results.

Rank	Dreamers	Country	Mentor's score
1	Dylan	Philippines	611
2	Zo	Philippines	610
3	Kenshin	Philippines	607
4	Zor	Philippines	599
5	Yunho	South Korea	593
6	Francis	Philippines	586
7	Adrian	Philippines	574
8	Kristoff	Philippines	573
9	Ivan	South Korea	567

=== Mission 1 — Unit Battle ===
The dreamers are divided into eight groups by Dream Mentors, each of groups consists of a performer, rapper, singer, and visual artist. Mentors allow the members to select their group leader after three groups consist of ten people and five groups consist of nine people.

Color key:

- Leader of the group

Group 1		Group 2		Group 3		Group 4	
Members	Rank	Members	Rank	Members	Rank	Members	Rank
Dylan	1	Adrian	7	Kylex	16	Kien	12
Ko	55	Gian	32	Kairo	31	Q	41
Cal	63	Karl	51	Harry	19	Matty	57
Seb	58	Sam	20	Perfect	70	Prince	27
Ash	15	Marco	24	Anton	11	Greg	73
Kristoff	8	Vhinz	45	Steel	56	Georgy	36
Paul	75	Yohan	47	Rov	65	Jeypi	10
Bren	42	Richard	40	Kai	66	Kyeo	33
Alex	34	Leo	39	Hart	29	Jayson	37
Group 5		Group 6		Group 7		Group 8	
Members	Rank	Members	Rank	Members	Rank	Members	Rank
Aian	17	Davey	21	Zo	2	Lanz	52
Ally	44	Ivan	9	Calix	23	Aj	26
Kylo	69	Jarred	71	Sandie	14	Juacho	43
Wave	46	Jay	50	Hayami	61	Hiro	53
Rafael	74	Rawn	38	Yannie	49	Vi	67
Elo	59	Yein	28	Jelord	68	Kenshin	3
Ram	54	Drei	72	Dree	60	Yunho	5
Gelo	13	Jacob	22	Kelvin	35	Vynz	48
Lem	18	SmileOne	62	Cali	64	Francis	6
Zor	4	Cody	30	—		Tehll	50

Four songs were revealed for the leaders to choose from: Tomorrow x Together's Back for More, Exo's Call Me Baby, Hori7on's Six7een, and Stray Kids' Maniac. To have a chance to pick their song first, the group leaders select their best dancer to compete in a one-on-one dance duel.

Color key

- Winner

Unit Battle Mission
Song selection	Group		Members	Scores
Six7een by Hori7on	5T★RTEN	Group 5	Aian, Ram, Zor, Gelo, Wave, Elo, Kylo, Lem, Ally, Rafael	503
Six7een by Hori7on	LUC1D	Group 2	Adrian, Gian, Karl, Sam, Marco, Vhinz, Yohan, Richard, Leo	488
Maniac by Stray Kids	SKYN9NE	Group 7	Zo, Kelvin, Hayami, Yannie, Calix, Sandie, Jelord, Cali, Dree	521
Maniac by Stray Kids	EYE-VENGERS	Group 8	Lanz, Yunho, Kenshin Vi, Francis, Hiro, AJ, Juacho, Tehll, Vynz	531
Call Me Baby by EXO	D1	Group 1	Dylan, KO, Cal, Kristoff, Ash, Alex, Seb, Paul, Bren	504
Call Me Baby by EXO	SH9NE	Group 3	Kylex, Rov, Steel, Perfect, Harry, Anton, Hart, Kai, Kairo	517
Back For More by Tomorrow x Together	NEUTOPIA	Group 4	Kien, Prince, Jayson, Jeypi, Georgy, Kyeo, Matty, Greg, Q	538
Back For More by Tomorrow x Together	NOVARIX	Group 6	Davey, Jacob, Ivan, Rawn, Jay, Jarred, Drei, Yein, SmileOne, Cody	544

=== MINI MISSION — MV Challenge ===
For this mission, the Dreamers formed their own Dream Teams through a recruitment process, with the Top 9 serving as leaders. Each leader recruited members of their choice, and those recruited had the option to either accept or decline.

Ivan and Yunho joined Zo’s team, leaving their Dream Team null and void, while Adrian was not able to recruit anyone. As a result, the original Dream Team, led by Ivan, Yunho, and Adrian, was dissolved, and only six new teams were formed. After the recruitment and deliberation process, the remaining Dreamers who were not initially invited were draft picked by the leaders to complete their teams. In total, 48 out of 75 Dreamers were selected, forming six groups with eight members each.

The unselected trainees were given a second chance through a special competition known as the Magic 6 Challenge. This competition allowed them to compete for an opportunity to join any of the six existing Dream Teams. There were three challenges in total, each producing two winners: Drei and Paul from the first challenge, Carl and Ally from the second, and Hart and Greg from the third.

Once the Magic 6 winners were determined, they were ranked through a voting process conducted by the Dreamers who were already part of Dream Teams. This ranking decided the order in which the Magic 6 members could choose their preferred team. Karl received the highest number of votes with 22, followed by Greg with 13 votes, Ally with 9, Hart and Drei each with 4 votes, and Paul with 2 votes.

Meanwhile, the remaining trainees who did not secure a spot in the Magic 6 and remained without a Dream Team were split into two groups, which were led by Kylo and Elo.

The Dream Team Leaders, each joined by one chosen member, took part in a high stakes music video challenge where time served as the currency for bidding on songs. Hosted by New Id's Thad, the teams had to make strategic decisions, sacrificing precious minutes in exchange for the rights to perform specific tracks. Kristoff made a bold move by bidding half of their available time to secure BBoom BBoom by Momoland, leaving their team with only one hour to shoot their entire music video, the shortest timeframe among all participants. In contrast, the other teams managed their bids more conservatively, securing good songs while still retaining a decent amount of time to work with.

The music videos were shot at Splash Island in Biñan, where the vibrant and playful setting added energy and creativity to each team’s performance. Finally, the completed music videos were judged by none other than the members of Hori7on, who used their performance experience to evaluate each entry. With only one team crowned as the winner, the challenge tested not just performance skills and creativity, but also teamwork, time management, and strategic thinking.

Dream Team Recruitment

Color key:

- Dream Team Leader
- Recruited
- Declined
- Recruited by another Dream Team
- Leader recruited by another Dream Team (Dissolved)

Dylan (Rank 1)		Zo (Rank 2)		Kenshin (Rank 3)	
Members	Rank	Members	Rank	Members	Rank
Richard	40	Yunho	5	Kien	12
Jeypi	10	Ivan	9	Kylex	16
Cody	30	Rawn	38	Rawn	38
Harry	19	Jacob	22	Tehll	25
Rawn	38	Lanz	52	Dylan	1
Zo	2	Gelo	13	Jay	50
Kien	12	Kien	12	Ivan	9
Kelvin	35	Kelvin	35	Yunho	5
Zor (Rank 4)		Yunho (Rank 5)		Francis (Rank 6)	
Members	Rank	Members	Rank	Members	Rank
Jeypi	10	Lanz	52	Lanz	52
Jacob	22	Vynz	48	Kelvin	35
Leo	39	Zo	2	Yunho	5
Richard	40	Ivan	9	Ivan	9
Lanz	52	Francis	6	Jacob	22
Kelvin	35	Adrian	7	Rawn	38
Ivan	9	Kylex	16	Kien	12
Prince	27	Kien	12	Dylan	1
Adrian (Rank 7)		Kristoff (Rank 8)		Ivan (Rank 9)	
Members	Rank	Members	Rank	Members	Rank
Dylan	1	Anton	11	Yunho	5
Yunho	5	Juacho	43	Lanz	52
Jacob	22	Francis	6	Francis	6
Zo	2	Ivan	9	Kenshin	3
Kien	12	Kairo	31	Yohan	57
Zor	4	Calix	23	Kelvin	35
Kenshin	3	Kelvin	35	Zo	2
Jeypi	10	Georgy	36	Kein	12

Dream Team after Draft Pick and Magic Six Challenge

Color key:

- Dream Team Leader
- Recruited
- Draft-picked
- Magic Six

Dylan (Rank 1)		Zo (Rank 2)		Kenshin (Rank 3)		Zor (Rank 4)	
Members	Rank	Members	Rank	Members	Rank	Members	Rank
Cody	30	Yunho	5	Kylex	16	Jeypi	10
Harry	19	Ivan	9	Tehll	25	Leo	39
Ram	54	Jacob	22	Jay	50	Richard	40
Vynz	48	Lanz	52	Aian	17	Prince	27
Sandie	14	Gelo	13	Yohan	57	Cal	63
Vi	67	Kien	12	Gian	32	Marco	24
Hayami	61	Adrian	7	Jarred	71	Matty	57
Jayson	37	AJ	26	Q	41	Alex	34
Greg	73	Hart	29	Paul	75	Drei	72
Francis (Rank 6)		Kristoff (Rank 8)		Elo (Rank 59)		Kylo (Rank 69)	
Members	Rank	Members	Rank	Members	Rank	Members	Rank
Kelvin	35	Anton	11	Bren	42	Rov	65
Rawn	38	Juacho	43	Cali	64	Kai	66
Kyeo	33	Kairo	31	Yein	28	Steel	56
KO	55	Calix	23	Dree	60	Jelord	68
Wave	46	Georgy	36	Seb	58	Perfect	70
Ash	15	Davey	21	Hiro	52	Rafael	74
Sam	20	Lem	18	—		—	
Yannie	49	Smileone	62	—		—	
Karl	51	Ally	44	—		—	

Result

- Winner

Song	Dream Team
Marionette by Lapillus	ZOR
The Day We Meet Again by New Id	FRANCIS
BBoom BBoom by Momoland	KRISTOFF
Cold by Hori7on	KENSHIN
Sumayaw Sumunod by Hori7on	KYLO
Banana Chacha by Momoland	ELO
Deja vu by New Id	DYLAN
Lucky by Hori7on	ZO

=== Mission 2 — Unit Battle (Original Song) ===
The remaining 44 dreamers were given the opportunity to select the songs they wished to perform. The order of selection was determined by their individual rankings, beginning with the lowest-ranked contestant and ending with the highest. Four songs were available for selection.

At the end of the process, any song with more than nine members required the group to hold an internal deliberation to evict the excess trainees. After the adjustments, four songs ended up with nine members each, while one song ended with eight members.

The dreamers were scored individually, with no benefit points this time. A higher individual score increases the likelihood that a group’s overall performance is strong, giving its members a greater chance of survival. The next eliminations will be decided purely by the mentors’ scores for Mission 2.

Color key:

- Leader of the group

UDONIA		XAVAGE		JOKER		NXT-REBEL		NEVELIM	
Members	Rank	Members	Rank	Members	Rank	Members	Rank	Members	Rank
IVAN	10	JEYPI	5	WAVE	35	YOHAN	18	RAWN	4
Calix	23	Zor	12	Dylan	1	Yunho	8	Kenshin	2
Smileone	43	Gelo	22	Adrian	44	Davey	6	Kelvin	25
Q	37	Harry	7	Prince	14	Jay	42	Lem	27
Kien	32	Tehll	24	Kylex	3	Ram	36	Anton	17
Jacob	26	Cali	16	Kristoff	34	Francis	13	Jarred	33
Kyeo	31	AJ	11	Bren	20	Zo	15	Lanz	30
Leo	39	Vi	28	Ally	29	Yein	19	Cody	9
Richard	38	Rov	21	—		Greg	41	Aian	40

- Highest Score

Song	Group	Score
PERFECT CHEMISTRY	NXT-REBEL	5,191
GALAXY VOYAGE	XAVAGE	4,914
NEW CALEDONIA	UDONIA	4,700
LIMBO	NEVELIM	4,622
JOKER	JOKER	4,160

== Ranking ==
For the first ranking, only the mentors determined the Dreamers' ranks, establishing the initial order based on their level test performance. During the first elimination, the rankings were determined by a combination of the mentors’ scores from Mission 1 and global fan votes, which together decided which Dreamers would continue in the competition. However, for the second elimination, only the mentors’ scores from Mission 2 were used to determine the rankings and decide who would advance to the finals. In the final round, both the mentors and global fans had a say once again, with the final rankings determined by a weighted ratio of 80 percent mentors' scores and 20 percent global fan votes.

Color key

New Top 9

Rank	Level Test	1st Elimination	2nd Elimination	Grand Finals
1	Dylan	Dylan	Yunho (▲7)	Yunho
2	Zo	Kenshin (▲1)	Dylan (▼1)	Yohan (▲6)
3	Kenshin	Kylex (▲13)	Tehll (▲21)	Ivan (▲3)
4	Zor	Rawn (▲4)	Zo (▲11)	Tehll (▼1)
5	Yunho	Jeypi (▲5)	Davey (▲1)	Zor (▲2)
6	Francis	Davey (▲15)	Ivan (▲4)	Smileone (▲9)
7	Adrian	Harry (▲12)	Zor (▲5)	Francis (▲7)
8	Kristoff	Yunho (▼3)	Yohan (▲9)	Gelo (▲8)
9	Ivan	Cody (▲21)	Jeypi (▼4)	Dylan (▼7)
