= World of Dance Philippines =

- The title card of World of Dance Philippines
- Genre: Reality competition
- Directed by: Jon Raymond Moll
- Presented by: main: Luis Manzano; Pia Wurtzbach; online: AC Bonifacio; Maymay Entrata; Riva Quenery
- Judges: Billy Crawford; Gary Valenciano; Maja Salvador
- Country of origin: Philippines
- Original languages: Filipino (main); English (secondary)
- No. of seasons: 1
- No. of episodes: 26

Production
- Camera setup: multi-camera setup
- Production companies: ABS-CBN Studios; World of Dance; Nuyorican Productions; Universal Television Alternative

Original release
- Network: ABS-CBN
- Release: January 12 – April 14, 2019

Related
- World of Dance (U.S.)

World of Dance Philippines is a Philippine television interactive reality competition show broadcast by ABS-CBN. The show is based on the American television show of the same title. Hosted by Luis Manzano and Pia Wurtzbach, it aired on the network's Yes Weekend! line up from January 12 to April 14, 2019, replacing the first season of I Can See Your Voice and was replaced by the first season of Idol Philippines. The series will feature dance performers, including solo acts and larger groups, representing any style of dance. A second season has yet to be produced.

== Overview ==
Dubbed as "the biggest dance competition in the world", the Philippine version of the show is part of the World of Dance franchise.

== Format ==
World of Dance is a television series that originated in the United States.

Participants must be at least 8-years-old and above, and is open to both amateur and professional dancers.

== Online show ==
An online show hosted by Maymay Entrata, Riva Quenery and AC Bonifacio titled World of Dance Online is aired simultaneously with the main show.

== Season summary ==
Season	Premiere	Finale	Winner	Runner-up	Third place	Hosts	Judges
1	January 12, 2019	April 7, 2019	FCPC Baliktanaw	Luka & Jenalyn	Ken San Jose	Luis Manzano; Pia Wurtzbach	Billy Crawford; Maja Salvador; Gary Valenciano
