= Safety Zone (song) =

DMTN song

Single by DMTN
- Released: January 29, 2013
- Length: 3:26
- Label: 2Works
- Songwriter(s): Duble Sidekick
- Producer(s): Duble Sidekick

DMTN singles chronology
"E.R" (2012)	"Safety Zone" (2013)	"Never Forget" (2020)

"Safety Zone" is a song recorded by South Korean idol group DMTN. It was released as a single on January 29, 2013, by 2Works Entertainment and distributed by Kakao M. Following the group's departure from IS Entermedia Group, they signed with 2Works and began working on new music. Prior to the song's release, DMTN changed their name from Dalmatian.

DMTN performed "Safety Zone" on various music chart shows, and the single peaked at number 131 on South Korea's national Gaon Digital Chart. The song became DMTN's final release following the arrest of vocalist Daniel for smoking and distributing marijuana. The circumstances led to the group's eventual demise.

== Background and composition ==
Dalmatian released their mini-album State of Emergency on May 16, 2012. Later that year, their contract with IS Entermedia Group expired and the group signed with the newly established 2Works Entertainment. They changed their name to DMTN the following January. Standing for "Desire, Motivation, Timing, Now", the initialism was conceived by vocalist Daniel. Youngwon also decided to retire his stage name and began using his birth name Donglim. DMTN began working on new music upon signing with their new agency. "Safety Zone" is a medium-tempo song which incorporates a piano, electric guitar, and drumline. Jeesu and Inati described it as an emotional song about the "desperate feelings of a man wanting to cling onto his lover". It written and produced by Duble Sidekick, who had previously produced "E.R" for the group.

== Release and promotion ==
On January 21, 2013, 2Works Entertainment announced "Safety Zone" and began publishing individual image and video teasers of the DMTN members. The teasers for Daniel, Inati, Jeesu, Simon, and Donglim were respectively distributed for five consecutive days. The members donned high-end clothing and casual wear to illustrate a "neo futuristic look". A music video teaser for the single was shared one day prior to its release. "Safety Zone" was released on January 29.

DMTN began promoting "Safety Zone" on weekly music chart shows the following day by performing the single on MBC Music's Show Champion. They made additional performances on Mnet's M Countdown, SBS MTV's The Show, KBS2's Music Bank, Munhwa Broadcasting Corporation's (MBC) Show! Music Core, and Seoul Broadcasting System's (SBS) Inkigayo. On March 8, the Seoul Metropolitan Police Agency filed an arrest warrant for Daniel on suspicions of smoking and selling marijuana. DMTN suspended promotional activities as a result of the revelation. It ultimately led to the demise of the group.

== Commercial performance ==
On the chart dated January 27 – February 2, 2013, "Safety Zone" debuted at number 131 on South Korea's national Gaon Digital Chart. By the end of February, the single sold 21,791 downloads domestically.

== Track listing ==
Track listing
No.	Title	Lyrics	Music	Arrangement	Length
1.	"Safety Zone"	Duble Sidekick	Duble Sidekick	Duble Sidekick	3:26
2.	"Safety Zone" (Inst.)		Duble Sidekick	Duble Sidekick	3:26
Total length:					6:52

== Charts ==
Chart (2010)	Peak position
Gaon Digital Chart	131
