= Round 1 (song) =

Single by Dalmatian

from the EP Dalmatian
- Language: Korean
- Released: September 1, 2010
- Recorded: 2010
- Genre: Dance
- Length: 3:24
- Label: IS Entermedia Group
- Songwriters: MC Mong; David Kim; Jo Yeong-su

Dalmatian singles chronology
"Round 1" (2010)	"That Man Opposed" (2011)

"Round 1" is the debut single by South Korean idol group Dalmatian. It was released on September 1, 2010, through IS Entermedia Group and distributed by LOEN Entertainment. The sextet was formed by rapper MC Mong and managed under his newly formed record label Monkey Funch. Inspired by music of the 1990s, the song is a dance track about the group members' aspirations.

The single and music video for "Round 1" were concurrently released. Dalmatian promoted the song on various music chart shows, and it peaked at number 102 on South Korea's national Gaon Digital Chart. The track was included in the group's debut mini-album Dalmatian (2011).

== Background and composition ==
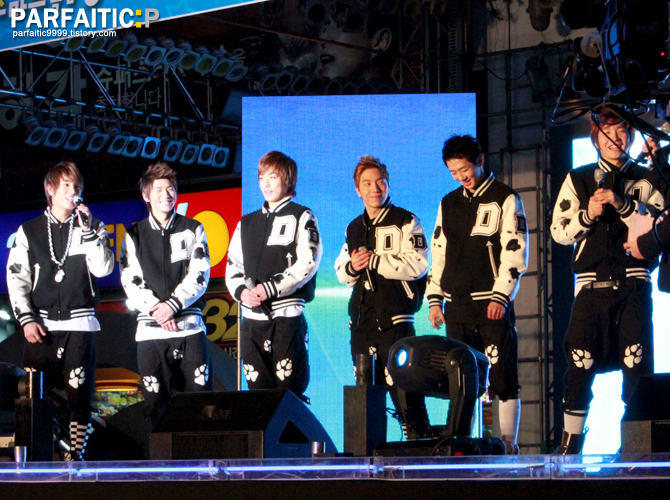
Dalmatian performing in Bucheon, 2010

Following the establishment of his record company Monkey Funch in December 2009, MC Mong announced his intention to debut five-member boy group Dalmatian by the following February. With the members' ages ranging from 20 to 28, he wanted to "pursue the music boundaries between idols and adults".

"Round 1" was written by MC Mong and member Day Day (credited as David Kim), and composed by Jo Yeong-su and MC Mong. It is composed in the key of A flat major using common time. The track shifts from electronic music and "machine sounds", as well as avoids love themes in its lyrics which dominated the Korean music industry at the time. A dance song, "Round 1" opts for a 1990s-inspired sound with an "addictive" chorus, focusing on lyrics revolving around the aspirations of the members following their five-year training period.

== Release and promotion ==
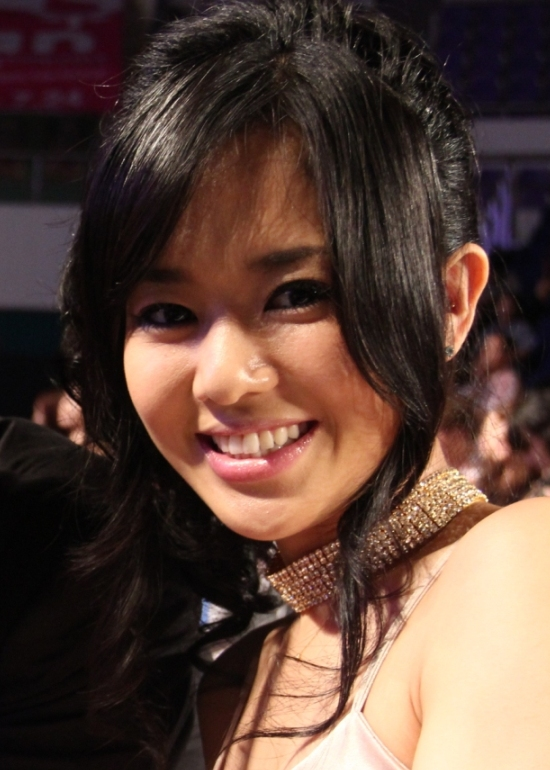
Dalmatian "rushed" Sola Aoi (pictured in 2011) at Gimpo Airport

On August 25, 2010, a music video teaser was uploaded for Dalmatian's debut single "Round 1". Directed by Jo Su-hyeon, it showcases a member of the group walking into a room filled with shoes, where he selects a pair with a dalmatian pattern and leaves behind paw prints on the floor. The prints symbolized "that DMTN will enter the music world and leave their mark". Conceptually, the group's image was labeled as "bad boys". In order to generate headlines for its upcoming debut, labelmate Park Jang-geun orchestrated Dalmatian to greet Japanese AV idol actress Sola Aoi at Gimpo Airport later that day. Aoi, who was promoting Liveplex's MMORPG Dragona Online at the time, was "rushed" by the group with a bouquet of flowers upon her arrival. She immediately posted about the incident on Twitter and "Dalmatian" become the top-searched item on search engine Naver.

"Round 1" and its music video were concurrently released on September 1. Dalmatian made its debut live performance with the track on Korean Broadcasting System's (KBS) Music Bank. The sextet continued promoting the song in subsequent performances on Seoul Broadcasting System's (SBS) Inkigayo and Munhwa Broadcasting Corporation's (MBC) Show! Music Core. "Round 1" was included in the group's debut mini-album Dalmatian (2011).

== Commercial performance ==
On the chart dated August 29 – September 4, 2010, "Round 1" debuted at number 146 on South Korea's national Gaon Digital Chart. The following week, it rose to its peak rank at 102.

== Track listing ==
Track listing
No.	Title	Lyrics	Music	Arrangement	Length
1.	"Round 1"	MC Mong, David Kim	Jo Yeong-su, MC Mong	Jo Yeong-su	3:24
2.	"Round 1" (Inst.)		Jo Yeong-su, MC Mong	Jo Yeong-su	3:24
Total length:					6:48

== Charts ==
Chart (2010)	Peak position
Gaon Digital Chart	102
Gaon Mobile Chart	83
