= Dalmatian (EP) =

EP by Dalmatian
- Released: February 14, 2011
- Recorded: 2010–2011
- Genre: Dance; hip hop
- Length: 25:11
- Language: Korean
- Label: IS Entermedia Group

Dalmatian chronology
Dalmatian (2011)	State of Emergency (2012)

Singles from Dalmatian
- 1. "Round 1" Released: September 1, 2010; 2. "That Man Opposed" Released: February 14, 2011; 3. "Lover Cop" Released: February 14, 2011

Dalmatian is the debut mini-album by South Korean idol group Dalmatian. It was released on February 14, 2011, through IS Entermedia Group and distributed by LOEN Entertainment. Filled with songs revolving around love stories, the record was musically, conceptually, and visually conceived by the members of the group. Preceding its release, "Round 1" was released in September of the previous year as Dalmatian's introductory single.

Dalmatian and its two lead singles "That Man Opposed" and "Lover Cop" were concurrently released on Valentine's Day. Dalmatian promoted the record through music chart programs across various television networks by performing both songs. The mini-album peaked at number 22 on South Korea's national Gaon Album Chart, selling over 5,700 copies since its release.

== Background ==
In order to better communicate with fans and create an album with "emotional" music, Dalmatian decided to conceive a record with love stories. The group was able to freely determine the direction of its craft, including the music, lyrics, styling, concept, and theme. In addition to the tracks on the mini-album, the group wrote 60 other songs. The sextet practiced the choreography for their singles for three months. The title of the mini-album is a portmanteau of "dalmatian" and "musician".

== Artwork concept ==
The cover art for Dalmatian showcases the six members set against a white background, with black spotted patterns overlaid them to resemble a dalmatian dog. The colors symbolize the "internal suffering" endured by the members for the years they spent training, while also signaling to a "bright" future. In the album photos, henna was applied on the faces of rap members Inati, Day Day, and Dari to accentuate an impression of strength; vocalists Jeesu, Daniel, and Youngwon donned smoky eye shadow to convey a "soft" and "mature" ambience.

== Music structure ==
Described as being accompanied by a "sweet" melody and vocals, the opening track "Lover Cop" is a dance track which centers around a house beat and synthesizer. A guitar with an electronic rock sound was implemented into the refrain. The lyrics were written by Day Day, credited as David Kim, who was inspired by the film RoboCop (1987) to pen the song. The song was conceived as a result of the hypothetical question, "are robots also capable of feeling love?". The second track "That Man Opposed" is a hip hop-dance song compromising an "intense" beat and "moderate" piano. A story of unrequited love, it was inspired by Jeesu's middle school experience. Comparing the tracks to a dalmatian dog, the group felt that the former demonstrated a "black" feeling, while the latter's comical lyrics and "gentle and cute" appearance illustrated a "white" one. "Really Really" is a hip-hop track performed by rappers Inati, Day Day, and Dari. "Real Eyes" is a neo soul track with a simple jazz piano foundation. It is sung by vocalists Jeesu, Daniel, and Youngwon, with lyrics written by the former two. Serving as the closing track, "Round 1" is a dance song inspired by 1990s music.

== Release and promotion ==
Dalmatian released its debut single "Round 1" on September 1, 2010. Dalmatian was announced on January 2, 2011, with a scheduled release for the following month. Originally intending to release one lead single, group leader Inati expressed confidence in the music to simultaneously release a second. The music video teasers for the lead singles "That Man Opposed" and "Lover Cop" were directed by Jo Su-hyeon and unveiled on February 11. Dalmatian and the two music videos were concurrently released on Valentine's Day. On that day, the group held its Dalmatian 1st Mini Album Show showcase at Rolling Hall in the Seogyo-dong neighborhood of Hongdae. Dalmatian performed five songs in total, including both lead singles, and attracted between 200–300 attendees to the event.

Dalmatian began promoting "That Man Opposed" and "Lover Cop" three days later on Mnet's music chart show M Countdown, followed by subsequent comeback performances on Korean Broadcasting System's (KBS) Music Bank, Munhwa Broadcasting Corporation's (MBC) Show! Music Core, and Seoul Broadcasting System's (SBS) Inkigayo.

== Commercial performance ==
On the chart dated February 13 – 19, 2011, Dalmatian debuted at number 22 on South Korea's national Gaon Album Chart. By the end of the month, it shifted 2,933 units domestically. The mini-album ranked at number 202 on the year-end chart, selling 5,755 copies in 2011.

== Track listing ==
Track listing
No.	Title	Lyrics	Music	Arrangement	Length
1.	"Lover Cop"	David Kim	Disc Brothers	Disc Brothers	3:28
2.	"That Man Opposed" (그 남자는 반대; Geu Namjaneun Bandae)	David Kim, Park Jang-geun, Disc Brothers	Shinsadong Tiger, Choi Gyu-seong, Rado		3:37
3.	"Lost in Love"	Disc Brothers, David Kim	Disc Brothers	Disc Brothers	3:40
4.	"Really Really" (featuring So-hyun)	Dalmatian	Disc Brothers, Park Jang-geun, Day Day		3:27
5.	"Real Eyes"	Jeesu	Disc Brothers, Jeesu	Disc Brothers	3:55
6.	"Home Run"	Disc Brothers, David Kim	Disc Brothers, Park Jang-geun		3:39
7.	"Round 1"	MC Mong, David Kim	Jo Yeong-su, MC Mong	Jo Yeong-su	3:25
Total length:					25:11

== Charts ==
Weekly
Chart (2011)	Peak position
Gaon Album Chart	22

Year-end
Chart (2011)	Peak position
Gaon Album Chart	202
