= World of Dance Philippines season 1 =

Philippine reality dance competition

World of Dance Philippines
- Season 1
- Hosted by: Luis Manzano; Pia Wurtzbach
- Judges: Billy Crawford; Maja Salvador; Gary Valenciano
- Winner: FCPC Baliktanaw
- Runners-up: Luka & Jenalyn

Release
- Original network: ABS-CBN
- Original release: January 12 – April 7, 2019

The first season of the Philippine reality dance competition World of Dance Philippines premiered on January 12, 2019, on ABS-CBN. Billy Crawford, Maja Salvador, and Gary Valenciano serve as the judges, with Luis Manzano and Pia Wurtzbach as hosts. The winning dance act received a prize of ₱2,000,000 and a chance to compete in World of Dance USA.

The inaugural season ended on April 7, 2019, with the FCPC Baliktanaw from the Team Division hailed as the winner.

== Online show ==
An online show hosted by Maymay Entrata, Riva Quenery and AC Bonifacio titled World of Dance Online is aired simultaneously with the main show on World of Dance Philippines' Facebook and YouTube accounts.

Edward Barber, Awra Briguela, Jervi Li (also known as KaladKaren Davila) Jeremy Glinoga and Ylona Garcia served as guest hosts in the absence of the main hosts.

== Dancers ==
Color key:

Winner
World Final
Divisional Final
The Cut
The Duels
Qualifiers
Withdrew

=== Junior (under 18) ===
Dance act	Age(s)	Hometown	Dance style	Elimination date	Placement
Ken San Jose	16	Los Angeles, California	Street dance	April 7, 2019	World Final
Ace of Spades	–	Angono, Rizal	Street dance	March 31, 2019	Divisional Final
Kristique	–	Canada	Street dance	March 31, 2019	Divisional Final
Cejrich & Tintin	–	Parañaque City / Pampanga	Ballroom	March 17, 2019	The Cut
Little Warriors	–	Tondo, Manila	Street dance	March 17, 2019	The Cut
Adriel & Alyza	–	Rizal	Ballroom	March 17, 2019	The Cut
Eiana Nova	10	Zambales	Street dance	March 17, 2019	The Cut
B2Win	–	Laguna / Quezon / Cavite / Bataan / Bulacan	Contemporary	March 17, 2019	The Cut
Groove Style	–	Iloilo	Street dance	March 17, 2019	The Cut
Junior Electro Groovers	–	Manila	–	March 10, 2019	The Duels
Nate Porcalla	–	United States	Street dance	March 10, 2019	The Duels
Katribu	–	Davao del Norte	–	March 10, 2019	The Duels
GenSan DSK	–	General Santos	Ballroom	March 2, 2019	The Duels
Glam Squad	15	Davao del Norte	Contemporary	March 2, 2019	The Duels
Cool Kids Crew	–	Pasig City, Metro Manila	–	March 2, 2019	The Duels
Dhao Mac	–	Digos, Davao del Sur	–	March 2, 2019	The Duels
GTweens	–	Metro Manila	Street dance	February 24, 2019	The Duels
Thy Grace	–	Iloilo	Street dance	February 23, 2019	The Duels
Dance Factory PH	–	Cavite	–	February 10, 2019	Qualifiers
Junior Hashtags	–	Metro Manila	–	February 10, 2019	Qualifiers
Seandrei	9/10	Quezon / Bulacan	Street dance	January 20, 2019	Qualifiers

=== Upper (18 and over, up to 4 members) ===
Dance act	Age(s)	Hometown	Dance style	Elimination date	Placement
Luka & Jenalyn	18/21	Toronto, Canada	Cabaret ballroom	April 7, 2019	World Final
Davnor JC Duo	–	Davao del Norte	Contemporary	March 31, 2019	Divisional Final
El-John	21	Mariveles, Bataan	Street dance	March 31, 2019	Divisional Final
Josef Lachica	–	Valenzuela, Metro Manila	–	March 16, 2019	The Cut
Renz Serrano	22	Muntinlupa	Contemporary	March 16, 2019	The Cut
Reflex	–	Quezon City, Metro Manila	B-boy	March 16, 2019	The Cut
Jay	26	General Santos	Street dance	March 16, 2019	The Cut
Asaf Goren	–	Los Angeles, California	B-boy	March 16, 2019	Withdrew
Mickey Yatar	–	Baguio, Baguio	Waacking	March 10, 2019	The Duels
Protohype	–	Naga, Camarines Sur	–	March 9, 2019	The Duels
BMG	–	Pasig City, Metro Manila	–	March 9, 2019	The Duels
Marky Aguilar	–	Laguna	–	March 9, 2019	The Duels
Joaquin Rosanes	–	Cavite	–	March 3, 2019	The Duels
T.A. Duo	–	Koronadal City, South Cotabato	Contemporary	March 3, 2019	The Duels
Zyro Santos	–	Pasig City, Metro Manila	Freestyle	February 24, 2019	The Duels
Josh & Melanie	–	Canada	Street dance	February 23, 2019	The Duels
Nicky and Nigelle	–	Parañaque City, Metro Manila	Contemporary	January 19, 2019	Qualifiers

=== Team (18 and over, 5-15 members) ===
Dance act	Age(s)	Hometown	Dance style	Elimination date	Placement
FCPC Baliktanaw	–	Bulacan	–	–	Winner
Crossover	–	Davao City, Davao del Sur	Street dance	March 30, 2019	Divisional Final
Hiraya	–	Metro Manila	Contemporary	March 30, 2019	Divisional Final
Dance Mate Xtreme	–	Compostela Valley	–	March 24, 2019	The Cut
The Exporters	–	Cebu	Urban	March 24, 2019	The Cut
The Addlib	–	–	–	March 24, 2019	The Cut
Overload Crew	–	Butuan	–	March 23, 2019	The Cut
Ground Zero	–	Koronadal City, South Cotabato	Street dance	March 24, 2019	The Cut
MKF	–	Davao City, Davao del Sur	–	March 24, 2019	The Cut
Tyga	–	Davao City, Davao del Sur	–	March 24, 2019	The Cut
Le'Go Fam	–	Laguna	–	March 10, 2019	The Duels
Step One Latin Sensation	–	General Santos	Dancesport	March 10, 2019	The Duels
417	–	Caloocan, Metro Manila	Street dance	March 9, 2019	The Duels
Move To The Groove	–	Metro Manila	Ethnic street dance	March 9, 2019	The Duels
Gofigure	–	Davao City, Davao del Sur	Waacking / Street dance	March 3, 2019	The Duels
The Idols	–	Antipolo, Rizal	Contemporary	March 3, 2019	The Duels
Novel Crime	–	Muntinlupa, Metro Manila	Street dance	March 3, 2019	The Duels
Foxy Ladies	–	Metro Manila	–	March 2, 2019	The Duels
FMD Extreme	–	Marikina, Metro Manila	–	February 24, 2019	The Duels
Nitrous Image Crew	–	Bulacan	–	February 23, 2019	The Duels
The Goddesses	–	Quezon City, Metro Manila	Belly dance	February 17, 2019	Qualifiers
VMA Poseidon	–	Bacolod City, Negros Occidental	Contemporary	February 16, 2019	Qualifiers
SB New Gen	–	Quezon City, Metro Manila	Street dance	January 12, 2019	Qualifiers
D'Squared Cru	–	Davao City, Davao del Sur	Street dance	January 26, 2019	Qualifiers

== Qualifiers ==
The qualifier round took place between January 12, 2019, and February 17, 2019. In each round of the Qualifiers, the dance acts performed a 2-minute routine in front of the judges and a live audience. They were scored by the judges based on the following criteria: Performance, Technique, Choreography, Creativity & Presentation. Each criterion is worth 20 points with a perfect score of 100. For the dance act to move forward, they must receive an average score of 80 or higher.

Color key:

Contestant was eliminated

=== Episode 1 (January 12) ===
Order	Name	Division	Performance Song	Judges' Score			
Order	Name	Division	Performance Song	Billy	Maja	Gary	Average
1	Ace of Spades	Junior	"Low" – Flo Rida	94	94	95	94.3
2	Renz Serrano	Upper	"'Di Na Muli" – Janine Tenoso	86	93	91	90.0
3	SB New Gen	Team	"Baile" – Sexbomb Girls	77	79	77	77.7
4	The Exporters	Team	"Weakness" – Jeremy Zucker	95	87	95	92.3

=== Episode 2 (January 13) ===
Order	Name	Division	Performance Song	Judges' Score			
Order	Name	Division	Performance Song	Billy	Maja	Gary	Average
1	Hiraya	Team	"Unsteady" – X Ambassadors	90	90	87	89
2	GenSan DSK	Junior	"Conga" – Miami Sound Machine	91	86	91	89.3
3	Ground Zero	Team	–	86	90	88	88
4	Asaf Goren	Upper	–	89	93	85	89

=== Episode 3 (January 19) ===
Order	Name	Division	Performance Song	Judges' Score			
Order	Name	Division	Performance Song	Billy	Maja	Gary	Average
1	Crossover	Team	–	90	90	85	88.3
2	Ken San Jose	Junior	"Huwag Ka Nang Humirit" – James Reid	91	93	90	91.3
3	Nicky and Nigelle	Upper	"Believer" – Imagine Dragons	78	82	79	79.7
4	Gofigure	Team	–	85	88	85	86

=== Episode 4 (January 20) ===
Order	Name	Division	Performance Song	Judges' Score			
Order	Name	Division	Performance Song	Billy	Maja	Gary	Average
1	Jay	Upper	"I Fall Apart" – Post Malone	81	90	86	85.7
2	Thy Grace	Junior	–	88	86	84	86
3	Seandrei	Junior	"Bongga Ka Day" – Hotdog	78	80	80	79.3
4	Davnor JC Duo	Upper	"Tagpuan" – Moira Dela Torre	91	92	89	90.7

=== Episode 5 (January 26) ===
Order	Name	Division	Performance Song	Judges' Score			
Order	Name	Division	Performance Song	Billy	Maja	Gary	Average
1	D'Squared Cru	Team	"Budotz" – Q-York	77	78	78	77.7
2	El-John	Upper	–	84	93	91	89.3
3	Glam Squad	Junior	"Titanium" – David Guetta feat. Sia	83	89	87	86.3
4	B2Win	Junior	"Digmaan" – Quest feat. Julianne Tarroja	94	91	91	92

=== Episode 6 (January 27) ===
Order	Name	Division	Performance Song	Judges' Score			
Order	Name	Division	Performance Song	Billy	Maja	Gary	Average
1	Little Warriors	Junior	"Chain Hang Low" – Jibbs	92	85	86	87.7
2	Move To The Groove	Team	–	87	90	90	89
3	Cejrich & Tintin	Junior	"People Help the People" – Birdy	81	87	86	84.7
4	FCPC Baliktanaw	Team	–	92	93	94	93

=== Episode 7 (February 2) ===
Order	Name	Division	Performance Song	Judges' Score			
Order	Name	Division	Performance Song	Billy	Maja	Gary	Average
1	Le'Go Fam	Team	"Levels" - Avicii	90	87	85	87.3
2	Mickey Yatar	Upper	–	93	90	93	92
3	Cool Kids Crew	Junior	"Five More Hours" – Chris Brown feat. Deorro	85	82	85	84
4	Luka & Jenalyn	Upper	"Ain't No Sunshine" – Bill Withers (Lido Remix)	95	97	94	95.3

=== Episode 8 (February 3) ===
Order	Name	Division	Performance Song	Judges' Score			
Order	Name	Division	Performance Song	Billy	Maja	Gary	Average
1	Overload Crew	Team	"Eh Kasi Bata" – Jaymie Magtoto	91	90	90	90.3
2	Josef Lachica	Upper	"Pssst!" – Bullet Dumas	92	91	96	93
3	The Addlib	Team	"Move Your Body" – Sia	86	86	89	87
4	MKF	Team	–	–	–	–	81.3
5	Tyga	Team	–	–	–	–	80.3
6	Katribu	Junior	"I Can" - Donna Cruz	84	82	78	81.3
7	Dhao Mac	Junior	"Cinema" – Benny Benassi feat. Gary Go (Skrillex Remix)	91	91	94	92

=== Episode 9 (February 9) ===
Order	Name	Division	Performance Song	Judges' Score			
Order	Name	Division	Performance Song	Billy	Maja	Gary	Average
1	Nate Porcalla	Junior	"Sweet Dreams (Are Made of This)" – Eurythmics	90	93	84	88
2	Step One Latin Sensation	Team	"Express" – Christina Aguilera / Land Of 1000 Dances – Wilson Pickett	81	87	81	83
3	Zyro Santos	Upper	Kannibalen – Apashe	78	82	81	80.3
4	Foxy Ladies	Team	–	–	–	–	81.7
5	Nitrous Image Crew	Team	–	–	–	–	83
6	FMD Extreme	Team	–	–	–	–	80
7	Novel Crime	Team	"Basta't Kasama Ka" - Gloc-9 feat. Lirah Bermudez	80	79	81	80

=== Episode 10 (February 10) ===
Order	Name	Division	Performance Song	Judges' Score			
Order	Name	Division	Performance Song	Billy	Maja	Gary	Average
1	Groove Style	Junior	"Relight My Fire" – Take That	92	80	80	84
2	Josh & Melanie	Upper	"Apple Cherry" – NAO	88	85	86	86.3
3	Adriel & Alyza	Junior	"HayPa (Hayup Ah)" – MMJ	82	84	83	83
4	Dance Factory PH	Junior	"Kay Ganda ng Ating Musika" – Hajji Alejandro	–	–	–	78.7
5	Junior Hashtags	Junior	–	–	–	–	77.7
6	Eiana Nova	Junior	"Dulo" – Sarah Geronimo	86	89	92	80
7	Dance Mate Xtreme	Team	"One Step Closer" – Linkin Park	93	95	94	94

=== Episode 11 (February 16) ===
Order	Name	Division	Performance Song	Judges' Score			
Order	Name	Division	Performance Song	Billy	Maja	Gary	Average
1	T.A. Duo	Upper	"Hindi Ko Kaya" – Vina Morales & Denise Laurel	79	87	85	83.7
2	BMG	Upper	–	–	–	–	86
3	Protohype	Upper	–	–	–	–	80
4	Kristique	Junior	"Shanghai" - Nicki Minaj	80	83	77	80
5	VMA Poseidon	Team	"Hero" – Skillet	75	79	77	77
6	Junior Electro Groovers	Junior	"Jenny from the Block" – Jennifer Lopez	91	83	84	86

=== Episode 12 (February 17) ===
Order	Name	Division	Performance Song	Judges' Score			
Order	Name	Division	Performance Song	Billy	Maja	Gary	Average
1	The Idols	Team	"Say Something" – A Great Big World feat. Christina Aguilera	86	85	89	86.7
2	Reflex	Upper	"You've Got the Love" – Florence and the Machine	85	90	86	87
3	The Goddesses	Team	–	79	81	78	79.3
4	GTweens	Junior	"Yes Indeed" – Drake & Lil Baby	95	95	96	95.3
5	417	Team	"BaDINGA!" - TWRK / "Come Baby Come" – K7	93	91	91	91.7
—	Joaquin Rosanes	Upper	Unsteady - X Ambassadors	—	—	—	91.7
—	Marky Aguilar	Upper	—	—	—	—	83.7

== The Duels ==
In each round of The Duels, two acts in the same division compete for a spot in the next round. In each division, the acts with the top qualifying scores choose their opponents, then both acts perform back-to-back, receiving feedback from the judges. After each performance, the judges will score them in the 5 categories: Performance, Technique, Creativity, Choreography, and Presentation. The act with the highest average at the end of the duel moves on to the next round, the other faces immediate elimination.

Color key:

Dance act won the Duel and advanced to The Cut.
Dance act was eliminated in a duel.

The Qualifiers scores
Rank	Upper		Junior		Team	
Rank	Name	Score	Name	Score	Name	Score
1	Luka & Jenalyn	95.3	GTweens	95.3	Dance Mate Xtreme	94
2	Josef Lachica	93	Ace of Spades	94.3	FCPC Baliktanaw	93
3	Mickey Yatar	92	Nate Porcalla	92.3	The Exporters	92.3
4	Joaquin Rosanes	91.7	B2Win	92	417	91.7
5	Davnor JC Duo	90.7	Dhao Mac	92	Overload Crew	90.3
6	Renz Serrano	90	Ken San Jose	91.3	Hiraya	89
7	El-John	89.3	GenSan DSK	89.3	Move To The Groove	89
8	Asaf Goren	89	Eiana Nova	89	Crossover	88.3
9	Reflex	87	Little Warriors	87.7	Ground Zero	88
10	Josh & Melanie	86.3	Glam Squad	86.3	Le'Go Fam	87.3
11	BMG	86	Thy Grace	86	The Addlib	87
12	Jay	85.7	Junior Electro Groovers	86	The Idols	86.7
13	T.A. Duo	83.7	Cejrich & Tintin	84.7	Gofigure	86
14	Marky Aguilar	83.7	Cool Kids Crew	84	Step One Latin Sensation	83
15	Zyro Santos	80.3	Groove Style	84	Nitrous Image Crew	83
16	Protohype	80	Adriel & Alyza	83	MKF	81.3
17	—N/a		Katribu	81.3	Foxy Ladies	80.7
18	—N/a		Kristique	80	Tyga	80.3
19	—N/a		—N/a		FMD Extreme	80
20	—N/a		—N/a		Novel Crime	80

Color key:

Dance act won the Duel and advanced to The Cut

Song Not Shown	–

Episode	Order	Division	Dance Act	Performance Song	Judges' Score			
Episode	Order	Division	Dance Act	Performance Song	Billy	Maja	Gary	Average
Episode 13 (February 23, 2019)	1	Junior	Thy Grace	"Wings" – Little Mix	94	92	93	93
Episode 13 (February 23, 2019)	1	Junior	B2Win	–	97	93	96	95.3
Episode 13 (February 23, 2019)	2	Team	Nitrous Image Crew	–	90	88	90	89.3
Episode 13 (February 23, 2019)	2	Team	Crossover	–	98	94	96	96
Episode 13 (February 23, 2019)	3	Upper	Josh & Melanie	–	95	96	98	96.7
Episode 13 (February 23, 2019)	3	Upper	Davnor JC Duo	"Bakit Ba Ikaw" – Michael Pangilinan	96	98	97	97
Episode 14 (February 24, 2019)	1	Team	FMD Xtreme	"Pump It Up" – Joe Budden	89	90	85	88
Episode 14 (February 24, 2019)	1	Team	Dance Mate Xtreme	-	93	97	96	95.3
Episode 14 (February 24, 2019)	2	Upper	Zyro Santos	–	84	82	85	83.7
Episode 14 (February 24, 2019)	2	Upper	Asaf Goren	–	92	96	97	95
Episode 14 (February 24, 2019)	3	Junior	GTweens	"Slippery" – Migos feat. Gucci Mane	90	92	87	89.7
Episode 14 (February 24, 2019)	3	Junior	Kristique	–	93	94	94	93.7
Episode 15 (March 2, 2019)	1	Junior	Cejrich & Tintin	–	88	88	83	86.3
Episode 15 (March 2, 2019)	1	Junior	GenSan DSK	–	82	83	80	81.7
Episode 15 (March 2, 2019)	2	Team	The Exporters	–	89	89	92	90
Episode 15 (March 2, 2019)	2	Team	Foxy Ladies	–	80	83	83	82
Episode 15 (March 2, 2019)	3	Junior	Glam Squad	–	–	–	–	84
Episode 15 (March 2, 2019)	3	Junior	Groove Style	–	–	–	–	86.7
Episode 15 (March 2, 2019)	4	Junior	Little Warriors	–	–	–	–	94.3
Episode 15 (March 2, 2019)	4	Junior	Cool Kids Crew	–	–	–	–	84
Episode 15 (March 2, 2019)	5	Junior	Dhao Mac	–	93	95	94	94
Episode 15 (March 2, 2019)	5	Junior	Ken San Jose	–	94	96	95	95
Episode 16 (March 3, 2019)	1	Team	Hiraya	"Lean on Me"	96	94	95	95
Episode 16 (March 3, 2019)	1	Team	Go Figure	–	90	89	90	89.7
Episode 16 (March 3, 2019)	2	Upper	Joaquin Rosanes	"Walang Hanggan" – Quest	82	86	89	85.7
Episode 16 (March 3, 2019)	2	Upper	Jay	"Rolling in the Deep" – KZ Tandingan (cover)	85	88	89	87.3
Episode 16 (March 3, 2019)	3	Team	The Idols	–	–	–	–	87
Episode 16 (March 3, 2019)	3	Team	The Addlib	–	–	–	–	90.7
Episode 16 (March 3, 2019)	4	Team	Overload Crew	–	–	–	–	95
Episode 16 (March 3, 2019)	4	Team	Novel Crime	–	–	–	–	91.3
Episode 16 (March 3, 2019)	5	Upper	T.A. Duo	"Nais Ko" – Basil Valdez	82	90	88	86.7
Episode 16 (March 3, 2019)	5	Upper	Luka & Jenalyn	"Love Someone" – Lukas Graham	92	97	96	95
Episode 17 (March 9, 2019)	1	Team	Ground Zero		94	89	89	90.7
Episode 17 (March 9, 2019)	1	Team	417	–	92	88	85	88.3
Episode 17 (March 9, 2019)	2	Upper	BMG		89	89	91	90.7
Episode 17 (March 9, 2019)	2	Upper	Josef Lachica	–	95	90	93	92.7
Episode 17 (March 9, 2019)	3	Upper	Renz Serrano	–	–	–	–	92.7
Episode 17 (March 9, 2019)	3	Upper	Marky Aguilar	–	–	–	–	84.3
Episode 17 (March 9, 2019)	4	Upper	Protohype	–	–	–	–	86.3
Episode 17 (March 9, 2019)	4	Upper	Reflex	–	–	–	–	88.3
Episode 17 (March 9, 2019)	5	Team	FCPC Baliktanaw		96	96	96	96
Episode 17 (March 9, 2019)	5	Team	Move to the Groove	–	93	92	93	92.7
Episode 18 (March 10, 2019)	1	Junior	Adriel & Alyza		85	88	91	88
Episode 18 (March 10, 2019)	1	Junior	Katribu	"Time In" – Yeng Constantino	86	85	88	86.3
Episode 18 (March 10, 2019)	2	Upper	El-John		93	95	92	93.3
Episode 18 (March 10, 2019)	2	Upper	Mickey Yatar	"Your Body" – Christina Aguilera	91	91	93	91.7
Episode 18 (March 10, 2019)	3	Junior	Eiana Nova	–	–	–	–	92.7
Episode 18 (March 10, 2019)	3	Junior	Nate Porcalla	–	–	–	–	91.7
Episode 18 (March 10, 2019)	4	Team	Tyga	–	–	–	–	83.7
Episode 18 (March 10, 2019)	4	Team	Step One Latin Sensation	–	–	–	–	81
Episode 18 (March 10, 2019)	5	Junior	Junior Electro Groovers	–	–	–	–	83
Episode 18 (March 10, 2019)	5	Junior	Ace of Spades	–	–	–	–	85.3
Episode 18 (March 10, 2019)	6	Team	Le'Go Fam		95	90	89	91.3
Episode 18 (March 10, 2019)	6	Team	MKF		94	92	90	92

== The Cut ==
In The Cut, the 27 remaining acts compete for three spots in each of their divisions. As each dance act competes, their average score is displayed on a leaderboard for their division. Once a dance act's score falls out of the top 3, they face immediate elimination. For this round, each of the judges serve as mentors for one of the three divisions. Crawford mentored the Upper division; Salvador mentored the Junior division; and Valenciano worked with the Team division.

Asaf Goren withdrew from the competition due to an injury.

The Team division was split into two episodes due to time constraints.

Color key:

Dance act is in the top 3 of the division and advanced to the Divisional Finals.
Dance act was eliminated in The Cut.
Dance act withdrew from the competition.

The Duels scores
Rank	Upper		Junior		Team	
Rank	Name	Score	Name	Score	Name	Score
1	Davnor JC Duo	97	B2Win	95.3	Crossover	96
2	Asaf Goren	95	Ken San Jose	95	FCPC Baliktanaw	96
3	Luka & Jenalyn	95	Little Warriors	94.3	Dance Mate Xtreme	95.3
4	El-John	93.3	Kristique	93.7	Hiraya	95
5	Josef Lachica	92.7	Eiana Nova	92.7	Overload Crew	95
6	Renz Serrano	92.7	Adriel & Alyza	88	MKF	92
7	Reflex	88.3	Groove Style	86.7	The Addlib	90.7
8	Jay	87.3	Cejrich & Tintin	86.3	Ground Zero	90.7
9	—N/a		Ace of Spades	85.3	The Exporters	90
10	—N/a		—N/a		Tyga	83.7

Color key:

Dance act is in the top 3 of the division and advanced to the Divisional Final

Song Not Shown	–

Episode	Division	Order	Dance Act	Performance Song	Judges' Score			
Episode	Division	Order	Dance Act	Performance Song	Billy	Maja	Gary	Average
Episode 19 (March 16, 2019)	Upper	1	Jay		86	91	90	89
Episode 19 (March 16, 2019)	Upper	2	Renz Serrano	–	–	–	–	93.3
Episode 19 (March 16, 2019)	Upper	3	Reflex	–	–	–	–	92
Episode 19 (March 16, 2019)	Upper	4	Davnor JC Duo		93	96	95	94.7
Episode 19 (March 16, 2019)	Upper	5	Josef Lachica		93	94	94	93.7
Episode 19 (March 16, 2019)	Upper	6	Luka & Jenalyn	"Unsteady" – X Ambassadors	94	96	96	95.3
Episode 19 (March 16, 2019)	Upper	7	El-John		94	95	94	94.3
Episode 20 (March 17, 2019)	Junior	1	Groove Style		–	–	–	79.3
Episode 20 (March 17, 2019)	Junior	2	B2Win	"Liwanag Sa Dilim"	–	–	–	81.3
Episode 20 (March 17, 2019)	Junior	3	Ken San Jose		92	96	93	93.7
Episode 20 (March 17, 2019)	Junior	4	Adriel & Alyza		–	–	–	82.3
Episode 20 (March 17, 2019)	Junior	5	Little Warriors		–	–	–	82.3
Episode 20 (March 17, 2019)	Junior	6	Eiana Nova	"Hey Barbara"	83	89	84	85.3
Episode 20 (March 17, 2019)	Junior	7	Cejrich & Tintin	"Kiss the Rain"	84	88	87	86.3
Episode 20 (March 17, 2019)	Junior	8	Ace of Spades		93	96	94	94.3
Episode 20 (March 17, 2019)	Junior	9	Kristique		88	92	91	90.3
Episode 21 (March 23, 2019)	Team	1	Dance Mate Xtreme		91	90	92	91
Episode 21 (March 23, 2019)	Team	2	Overload Crew		89	83	85	85.7
Episode 21 (March 23, 2019)	Team	3	The Exporters	"I'm in Control" – AlunaGeorge feat. Popcaan	85	85	88	86
Episode 21 (March 23, 2019)	Team	4	Crossover	"Jar of Hearts" – Christina Perri	92	92	91	91.7
Episode 22 (March 24, 2019)	Team	5	The Addlib	"Body Dancer" – Magic Fire	–	–	–	81
Episode 22 (March 24, 2019)	Team	6	Tyga	"Funkytown" – Lipps Inc.	–	–	–	85.7
Episode 22 (March 24, 2019)	Team	7	Hiraya	"Pure Imagination" – Gene Wilder	93	94	91	92.7
Episode 22 (March 24, 2019)	Team	8	MKF		91	92	91	91.3
Episode 22 (March 24, 2019)	Team	9	Ground Zero	"Mr. Suave" – Parokya ni Edgar	89	90	91	90
Episode 22 (March 24, 2019)	Team	10	FCPC Baliktanaw	"Bebot" – The Black Eyed Peas	100	100	100	100

== Divisional Final ==
In the Divisional Final, the 3 remaining acts in each division face each other. Only one act per division proceeded to the World Final. In this round, Salvador served as the mentor for the Team division, Crawford for the Junior division, and Valenciano for the Upper division.

The Junior division performances were split into two episodes – the first two in the Saturday episode and the last one in the Sunday episode.

Color key:

Dance act received the highest average and advanced to the World Final.
Dance act was eliminated in the Divisional Final.

The Cut scores
Rank	Upper		Junior		Team	
Rank	Name	Score	Name	Score	Name	Score
1	Luka & Jenalyn	95.3	Ace of Spades	94.3	FCPC Baliktanaw	100
2	Davnor JC Duo	94.7	Ken San Jose	93.7	Hiraya	92.7
3	El-John	94.3	Kristique	90.3	Crossover	91.7

Color key:

Dance act received the highest average in their division and advanced to the World Final

Song Not Shown	–

Episode	Division	Order	Dance Act	Performance Song	Judges' Score			
Episode	Division	Order	Dance Act	Performance Song	Billy	Maja	Gary	Average
Episode 23 (March 30, 2019)	Team	1	Crossover	"Tambourine" - Eve feat. Swizz Beatz	90	88	89	89
Episode 23 (March 30, 2019)	Team	2	Hiraya	"My Immortal" – Evanescence	95	96	94	95
Episode 23 (March 30, 2019)	Team	3	FCPC Baliktanaw	"Para sa Masa" – Eraserheads	98	98	99	98.3
Episode 23 (March 30, 2019)	Junior	1	Kristique	"1, 2 Step" – Ciara feat. Missy Elliott	91	90	93	91.3
Episode 23 (March 30, 2019)	Junior	2	Ace of Spades	"Anak" – Sarah Geronimo	94	91	96	93.7
Episode 24 (March 31, 2019)	Junior	3	Ken San Jose	"In My Blood" – Shawn Mendes	96	95	96	95.7
Episode 24 (March 31, 2019)	Upper	1	Luka & Jenalyn	"Natural" – Imagine Dragons	99	98	98	98.3
Episode 24 (March 31, 2019)	Upper	2	El-John	"Take Me to Church" – Hozier	98	98	97	97.7
Episode 24 (March 31, 2019)	Upper	3	Davnor JC Duo	"Isang Linggong Pag-ibig" – KZ Tandingan	98	99	97	98

== World Final ==
In the World Final, the division champions competes head-to-head for the 2-million-peso grand prize. The dance acts compete in two rounds. In the first round, the assigned mentor chooses their performance song. In the second round, the dance act chooses their own song for the performance.

Valenciano mentored Luka & Jenalyn; Salvador mentored Ken San Jose; and Crawford mentored FCPC Baliktanaw.

Unlike other franchises, this round incorporates public vote in determining the winner. The viewers serve as the fourth judge. The viewers' vote will be converted to the 0–100 point scale. The viewers may vote through SMS and online. A maximum of one vote per method is implemented.

SMS

- Each act is assigned a unique voting code. The viewers may vote by texting the assigned code to 2366.

Online

- The user must have a Kapamilya account first. The viewers must then visit the ABS-CBN website. The photos of the acts will appear. Click the photo to vote for the act.

After all performances in each round, the voting lines were opened for the whole commercial break only. The voting lines were also closed after the commercial break and the scores were shown on a leaderboard.

Color key:

Dance act received the highest average and won the World Final.
Dance act was eliminated in the World Final.

Divisional Final scores
Rank	Upper		Junior		Team	
Rank	Name	Score	Name	Score	Name	Score
1	Luka & Jenalyn	98.3	Ken San Jose	95.7	FCPC Baliktanaw	98.3

=== Round 1 (Mentor's Choice) ===
Episode	Division	Order	Dance Act	Performance Song	Judges' Score				
Episode	Division	Order	Dance Act	Performance Song	Billy	Maja	Gary	Viewers	Average
Episode 25 (April 6, 2019)	Upper	1	Luka & Jenalyn	"Akin Ka Na Lang" - Morissette	95	97	96	90.68	94.67
Episode 25 (April 6, 2019)	Junior	2	Ken San Jose	"Toyang" – Eraserheads	96	96	95	91.41	94.60
Episode 25 (April 6, 2019)	Team	3	FCPC Baliktanaw	"Alive" – Lil Jon feat. Offset and 2 Chainz	100	100	100	97.90	99.47

=== Round 2 (Act's Choice) ===
Episode	Division	Order	Dance Act	Performance Song	Judges' Score				
Episode	Division	Order	Dance Act	Performance Song	Billy	Maja	Gary	Viewers	Average
Episode 26 (April 7, 2019)	Junior	1	Ken San Jose	"Lose Yourself" – Eminem	96	97	97	91.06	95.26
Episode 26 (April 7, 2019)	Upper	2	Luka & Jenalyn	"Shallow" – Lady Gaga and Bradley Cooper	100	100	100	92.37	98.09
Episode 26 (April 7, 2019)	Team	3	FCPC Baliktanaw	"Man from Manila" – Francis Magalona	100	99	99	96.55	98.63

=== Final Scores ===
Color key:

Dance act received the highest average and won the World Final.

Division	Dance Act	Scores			Result
Division	Dance Act	Round 1	Round 2	Average	Result
Junior	Ken San Jose	94.60	95.26	94.93	Third Place
Upper	Luka & Jenalyn	94.67	98.09	96.38	Runner-up
Team	FCPC Baliktanaw	99.47	98.63	99.05	Winner

== Galawang Pinoy ==
Galawang Pinoy was a post-season concert that was aired on April 13 and 14, 2019. It featured performances from the contestants, hosts and judges, as well as special guest performers including OPM singers Kyla and Yeng Constantino.

== Contestants who appeared on other shows ==
- Luka & Jenalyn competed in seasons 1 and 2 of World of Dance.
- FMD Extreme competed in season 4 of It's Showtime, and season 6 of Pilipinas Got Talent.
- Dance Mate Xtreme competed in It's Showtime, season 5 of Pilipinas Got Talent, and season 2 of Asia's Got Talent.
- B2Win auditioned as individuals and debuted as a dance group on Star Hunt: The Grand Audition Show.
- Junior Hashtags auditioned as individuals and debuted as a dance group on It's Showtime.
- Adriel & Alyza competed as Step Kids in Dance Kids.
- Dhao Mac and Nate Porcalla competed in Dance Kids.
- Asaf Goren competed in Celebrity Big Brother Israel 3 (which he won), Ninja Israel and The Challenge: Total Madness
- Eiana Nova appeared in the Philippine version of Little Big Shots.

== Ratings ==
Episode	Title	Date	Television ratings from Kantar Media		
Episode	Title	Date	Rating	Rank	
Episode	Title	Date	Rating	Timeslot	Primetime
1	The Qualifiers 1	January 12, 2019	31.9%	1	1
2	The Qualifiers 2	January 13, 2019	32.3%	1	1
3	The Qualifiers 3	January 19, 2019	29.0%	1	1
4	The Qualifiers 4	January 20, 2019	30.4%	1	1
5	The Qualifiers 5	January 26, 2019	29.3%	1	1
6	The Qualifiers 6	January 27, 2019	31.8%	1	1
7	The Qualifiers 7	February 2, 2019	29.4%	1	1
8	The Qualifiers 8	February 3, 2019	33.5%	1	1
9	The Qualifiers 9	February 9, 2019	31.0%	1	1
10	The Qualifiers 10	February 10, 2019	30.6%	1	1
11	The Qualifiers 11	February 16, 2019	31.8%	1	1
12	The Qualifiers 12	February 17, 2019	31.9%	1	1
13	The Duels 1	February 23, 2019	30.4%	1	1
14	The Duels 2	February 24, 2019	32.2%	1	1
15	The Duels 3	March 2, 2019	30.5%	1	1
16	The Duels 4	March 3, 2019	31.1%	1	1
17	The Duels 5	March 9, 2019	30.1%	1	1
18	The Duels 6	March 10, 2019	32.2%	1	1
19	The Cut 1	March 16, 2019	32.3%	1	1
20	The Cut 2	March 17, 2019	32.0%	1	1
21	The Cut 3	March 23, 2019	31.0%	1	1
22	The Cut 4	March 24, 2019	32.9%	1	1
23	Divisional Final 1	March 30, 2019	31.3%	1	1
24	Divisional Final 2	March 31, 2019	31.4%	1	1
25	World Final 1	April 6, 2019	30.5%	1	1
26	World Final 2	April 7, 2019	34.2%	1	1
27	Concert 1	April 13, 2019	25.1%	1	2
28	Concert 2	April 14, 2019	26.7%	1	2
