= List of Dream Maker contestants =

Dream Maker is a Filipino-South Korean reality competition show. 62 Dream Chasers, aged 13–22 years old, competed to debut in a 7-member P-pop boy group, who will be trained in South Korea.

== Contestants ==
The ages are as of the first episode aired on November 19, 2022.

Color key

Top 7
Top 7 (Mentors' and Public Votes separately)
Final members of Hori7on
Contestants eliminated in the final episode (Episode 26)
Contestants eliminated in the third elimination (Episodes 23–24)
Contestants eliminated in the second elimination (Episodes 17–18)
Contestants eliminated in the first elimination (Episodes 11–12)
Contestants that left the show

Name	Age	Hometown	Ranking																										Final Rank
Name	Age	Hometown	1st Mentors' Evaluation (Eps. 1–4)		Theme Song Mentors' Evaluation (Ep.5)	Group Battle Performances (Eps. 6–8)		1st Elimination Night (Eps. 11–12)					Position Mission (Eps. 13–16)		2nd Elimination Night (Eps. 17–18)					New K-pop Song Launch Mission (Eps. 19–20)		3rd Elimination Night (Eps. 23–24)					The Dream Finale (Ep. 26)		Final Rank
Name	Age	Hometown	Score	Rank	Grade	Mentors' Points	Rank	Public Votes	Public Points	Rank	Total Points (Mentors + Public)	Rank	Mentors' Points	Rank	Public Votes	Public Points	Rank	Total Points (Mentors + Public)	Rank	Mentors' Points	Rank	Public Votes	Public Points	Rank	Total Points (Mentors + Public)	Rank	Public Votes	Rank	Final Rank
Anjo Sarnate ^{1}	22	Quezon	471	55	C	505	53	78,119	670	14	1175	25	505	19	339,125	620	9	1125	8	195	28	367,400	430	18	625	26	Eliminated		26
Asa Wy	22	Cavite	379	61	C	624	28	63,412	630	18	1254	18	unrevealed ^{15}	34	unrevealed ^{15}				43	Eliminated									43
Asi Gatdula^{2}	22	Cavite	635	8	A	680	11	120,626	750	6	1430	4	516	15	139,246	430	28	946	28	366	19	320,782	380	23	746	22	Eliminated		22
Chie Tan^{3}	22	Davao	554	32	B	732	4	18,369	340 ^{16}	47	1072	35	537	11	66,269	320	39	857	35	Eliminated									35
Chris Pello	19	Pasig	585	20	C	unrevealed ^{15}	48	unrevealed ^{15}				56	Eliminated																56
Denrich Ang^{4}	19	Cavite	505	45	C	536	45	54,881	590	22	1126	30	519	14	143,806	450	26	969	26	415	12	314,052	370	24	785	18	Eliminated		18
DJ Villaver	16	Cebu	542	34	B	685	10	68,404	640	17	1325	10	482	24	119,584	380	33	862	34	Eliminated									34
Drei Amahan^{5}	19	Batangas	658	6	A	740	2	85,472	700 ^{17}	11	1440	3	647	2	228,123	530	18	1177	6	450	10	581,516	500	11	950	9	1,278,865	8	8
Gabby Regodon	19	Davao	584	21	C	593	33	10,456	270	54	863	50	Eliminated																50
Ishiro Incapas	19	Cavite	506	44	C	645	18	165,338	770^{18}	4	1415	5	471	28	299,849	570	14	1041	15	224	27	311,288	360	25	614^{25}	27	Eliminated		27
Jay Lagatao ^{6}	21	Laguna	567	27	A	573	36	85,657	710 ^{17}	10	1283	14	unrevealed ^{15}	30	unrevealed ^{15}				33	Eliminated									33
Jay-R Albino	18	Albay	714	1	C	661	15	69,632	650	16	1311	11	473	27	236,219	540	17	1013	20	435	11	483,525	460	15	895	12	868,537	12	12
Jeremy Austin	22	Australia	544	33	B	641	22	22,472	400	41	1041	38	unrevealed ^{15}	36	unrevealed ^{15}				40	Eliminated									40
Jeromy Batac	13	Quezon City	667	5	A	738	3	109,448	740	7	1478	1	709	1	443,900	650	6	1359	1	501	3	655,277	520	9	1021	5	3,188,238	1	1
JL Macatangay	20	Quezon City	494	48	B	503 ^{22}	55	unrevealed ^{15}				55	Eliminated																55
JM Ronquillo	22	Pasay	520	39	C	572	37	55,397	600	21	1172	27	474	26	110,442	350	36	824	36	Eliminated									36
John Regaña	19	Cagayan De Oro	538	35	B	unrevealed ^{15}	50	unrevealed ^{15}				47	Eliminated																47
Jom Aceron	17	Bulacan	595	18	A	699	7	51,641	580	23	1279	15	507	18	265,709	550	16	1057	13	385	18	799,975	550	6	935	10	580,965	15	15
Josh Labing-isa^{7}	20	Quezon City	633	9	B	558	41	47,404	560 ^{19}	25	1118	31	646	3	122,934	400	31	1046	14	364	20	683,512	530	8	894	13	490,059	16	16
Josh Worsley^{8}	17	Davao	420	59	B	631	25	27,619	450	36	1081	34	409	40	385,104	630	8	1039	16	332	22	334,452	410	20	742	24	Eliminated		24
Joshua Nubla^{9}	18	Cavite	508	42	C	639	23	60,129	620 ^{20}	19	1259	17	405	42	459,641	660	5	1065	11	245	26	593,071	510	10	755	20	Eliminated		20
Jules Indiola	22	Quezon City	485	51	B	678	12	47,573	550 ^{19}	26	1228	22	447	33	303,330	590	12	1037	17	261	24	545,935	490	12	751	21	Eliminated		21
Julian Osorio	15	Davao	525	36	Left the show																								61
Julius Ledesma	19	Taguig	524	37	B	659	16	25,628	430	38	1089	33	unrevealed ^{15}	39	unrevealed ^{15}				44	Eliminated									44
Justin Uy	22	Rizal	507	43	Left the show																								62
Karl Villamar	16	Rizal	630	11	C	638	24	22,538	410	40	1048	37	unrevealed ^{15}	41	unrevealed ^{15}				37	Eliminated									37
Kean Parale	21	Makati	588	19	C	686	9	38,458	480 ^{21}	33	1166	28	unrevealed ^{15}	31	unrevealed ^{15}				42	Eliminated									42
Kenzo Bautista^{10}	21	Bulacan	599	16	Left the show																								60
Kerwin Buenafe	21	Rizal	430	58	C	643	20	37,070	490 ^{21}	32	1133	29	unrevealed ^{15}	38	unrevealed ^{15}				39	Eliminated									39
Kim Ng^{10}	20	Bacolod	450	57	B	623	29	20,885	370	44	993	42	502	20	302,339	580	13	1082	10	412	14	685,358	540	7	952	8	2,214,510	6	6
KL Socobos	20	Cebu	576	24	B	569	39	72,090	660	15	1229	21	520	13	118,001	370	34	890	30	Eliminated									30
Kyler Chua	20	Quezon City	582	22	C	504	54	106,048	730	8	1234	19	480	25	338,569	610	10	1090	9	506	2	876,913	570	4	1076	3	2,697,520	3	3
Laurence Matias	20	Cavite	558	29	A	589	35	9,123	260	55	849	53	Eliminated																53
Lem Malubay	22	Davao	317	62	C	642	21	18,393	350 ^{16}	46	992	43	492	23	33,598	280	43	772	41	Eliminated									41
Luiz Aguaviva	18	Laguna	613	14	C	669	14	44,776	540	27	1209	24	440	35	212,131	520	19	960	27	404	17	248,121	340	27	744	23	Eliminated		23
Lyle Jangad	18	Cebu	625	13	B	696	8	49,609	570	24	1266	16	581	7	55,766	300	41	881	31	Eliminated									31
Macky Tuason	21	Taguig	605	15	C	509	51	182,701	790	2	1299	13	393	43	406,046	640	7	1033	18	411	15	474,413	450	16	861	15	621,197	14	14
Marcus Cabais^{11}	13	Bataan	670	3	A	592	34	171,778	780	3	1372	7	545	10	607,831	700	1	1245	3	489	5	1,188,502	600	1	1089	2	2,824,716	2	2
Mathew Cruz	20	Taguig	452	56	C	611	30	93,504	720	9	1331	9	unrevealed ^{15}	32	unrevealed ^{15}				29	Eliminated									29
Matt Cruz^{10}	21	Muntinlupa	491	49	A	672	13	17,070	330	48	1002	41	571	8	144,630	460	25	1031	19	474	8	333,821	400	21	874	14	809,523	13	13
Miguel Gonzalez^{12}	19	Parañaque	560	28	B	544	43	41,333	520	29	1064	36	unrevealed ^{15}	29	unrevealed ^{15}				38	Eliminated									38
Neil Limbaga	20	Cebu	629	12	B	571	38	22,917	420	39	991	44	495	22	194,905	510	20	1005	21	298	23	522,517	470	14	768	19	Eliminated		19
Omar Uddin^{11}	15	Cavite	632	10	B	543	44	15,567	310	50	853	52	Eliminated																52
Onie de Guzman	21	Parañaque	518	41	C	508	52	40,653	510	30	1018	39	unrevealed ^{15}	37	unrevealed ^{15}				32	Eliminated									32
Pan-Pan Rosas	18	Cebu	579	23	B	594	32	37,517	500 ^{21}	31	1094	32	509	17	149,187	490	22	999	22	342	21	251,833	350	26	692	25	Eliminated		25
Prince Encelan^{11}	14	Manila	557	30	B	644	19	18,303	360 ^{16}	45	1004	40	527	12	146,732	470	24	997	24	469	9	330,993	390	22	859	16	1,268,293	9	9
Redd Arcega	20	Quezon City	474	54	C	486 ^{22}	57	unrevealed ^{15}				46	Eliminated																46
Renz Cabading	21	Quezon City	575	25	B	567	40	14,189	290	52	857	51	Eliminated																51
Reyster Yton	19	Nueva Ecija	598	17	A	597	31	165,885	760^{18}	5	1357	8	553	9	588,480	690	2	1243	4	487	6	818,429	560	5	1047	4	2,285,407	5	5
Ron Castillo	22	Oriental Mindoro	519	40	C	628	26	83,573	680	13	1308	12	392	44	305,110	600	11	992	25	247	25	165,789	330	28	577	28	Eliminated		28
Russu Laurente^{13}	21	General Santos	486	50	A	713	5	35,640	460	35	1173	26	643	4	137,297	420	29	1063	12	413	13	424,245	440	17	853	17	Eliminated		17
Steel Macabanti	20	Muntinlupa	556	31	C	626	27	5,381	240	57	866	49	Eliminated																49
Tanner Evans^{10}	21	Quezon City	569	26	A	546	42	3,140	230	58	776	57	Eliminated																57
Tatin Castillon^{10}	25	Cavite	637	7	A	Left the show																							59
Thad Sune	19	Bulacan	522	38	B	703	6	44,001	530	28	1233	20	498	21	161,627	500	21	995	23	499	4	344,095	420	19	919	11	995,396	11	11
Tony Migallon	20	Bohol	484	52	B	unrevealed ^{15}	46	unrevealed ^{15}				45	Eliminated																45
Toven Bella	21	Canada	407	60	C	unrevealed ^{15}	58	unrevealed ^{15}				58	Eliminated																58
Vieo Garcia	21	Baguio	504	46	C	unrevealed ^{15}	56	unrevealed ^{15}				48	Eliminated																48
Vinci Malizon	22	Batangas	668	4	A	647	17	260,538	800	1	1447	2	582	6	526,083	680	3	1262	2	512	1	1,098,401	590	2	1102	1	2,447,877	4	4
Wayne Gutierrez	20	Pampanga	481	53	C	unrevealed ^{15}	47	unrevealed ^{15}				54	Eliminated																54
Wilson Budoy^{14}	21	Austria	673	2	A	794	1	60,282	610^{17}	20	1404	6	589	5	269,049	560	15	1149	7	480	7	541,808	480	13	960	7	1,169,948	10	10
Winston Pineda	17	Samar	498	47	A	523	49	85,663	690 ^{17}	12	1213	23	511	16	498,408	670	4	1181	5	405	16	883,628	580	3	985	6	2,049,832	7	7

== Dream Mentors' Evaluation (Episodes 1-4) ==
Dream Chasers will perform individually in front of the Dream Mentors. After each performance, the Dream Mentors will comment and provide feedback on each performance and each Dream Mentor will give points to each of the Dream Chasers. The maximum points possible for a Dream Chaser to earn from each Dream Mentor is 100, for a maximum possible score of 900 points for each contestant. This point system will form the basis of their ranks. If the succeeding Dream Chaser gets a higher rank than the Dream Chaser sitting, he will be bumping off other Dream Chasers based on the order of rank.

Color key

Performance was partially aired on TV / not aired on TV

Episode	Order	Dream Chaser	Song	Original Artist	Mentor's Score	Top 7						
Episode	Order	Dream Chaser	Song	Original Artist	Mentor's Score	Rank 1	Rank 2	Rank 3	Rank 4	Rank 5	Rank 6	Rank 7
Episode 1 (November 19)	1	Vinci Malizon	Lullaby	GOT7	668	Vinci Malizon						
Episode 1 (November 19)	2	Lyle Jangad	Ikot-Ikot	Sarah Geronimo	625	Vinci Malizon	Lyle Jangad					
Episode 1 (November 19)	3	Ishiro Incapas	Ikaw Ang Aking Mahal		506	Vinci Malizon	Lyle Jangad	Ishiro Incapas				
Episode 1 (November 19)	4	Luiz Aguaviva	Simpleng Tulad Mo	Daniel Padilla	614	Vinci Malizon	Lyle Jangad	Luiz Aguaviva	Ishiro Incapas			
Episode 1 (November 19)	5	Jeremy Austin	The Baddest	BGYO	544	Vinci Malizon	Lyle Jangad	Luiz Aguaviva	Jeremy Austin	Ishiro Incapas		
Episode 1 (November 19)	6	Jules Indiola			485	Vinci Malizon	Lyle Jangad	Luiz Aguaviva	Jeremy Austin	Ishiro Incapas	Jules Indiola	
Episode 1 (November 19)	7	Wayne Gutierrez			481	Vinci Malizon	Lyle Jangad	Luiz Aguaviva	Jeremy Austin	Ishiro Incapas	Jules Indiola	Wayne Gutierrez
Episode 1 (November 19)	8	JM Ronquillo	Dahil Sa'yo	Iñigo Pascual	520	Vinci Malizon	Lyle Jangad	Luiz Aguaviva	Jeremy Austin	JM Ronquillo	Ishiro Incapas	Jules Indiola
Episode 1 (November 19)	9	Kerwin Buenafe	Babaero		430	Vinci Malizon	Lyle Jangad	Luiz Aguaviva	Jeremy Austin	JM Ronquillo	Ishiro Incapas	Jules Indiola
Episode 1 (November 19)	10	JL Macatangay	Simpleng Tulad Mo	Daniel Padilla	494	Vinci Malizon	Lyle Jangad	Luiz Aguaviva	Jeremy Austin	JM Ronquillo	Ishiro Incapas	JL Macatangay
Episode 1 (November 19)	11	Asi Gatdula	Magda		635	Vinci Malizon	Asi Gatdula	Lyle Jangad	Luiz Aguaviva	Jeremy Austin	JM Ronquillo	Ishiro Incapas
Episode 1 (November 19)	12	Macky Tuason	Binibini		605	Vinci Malizon	Asi Gatdula	Lyle Jangad	Luiz Aguaviva	Macky Tuason	Jeremy Austin	JM Ronquillo
Episode 1 (November 19)	13	Vieo Garcia	Kulang Ako Kung Wala Ka		504	Vinci Malizon	Asi Gatdula	Lyle Jangad	Luiz Aguaviva	Macky Tuason	Jeremy Austin	JM Ronquillo
Episode 1 (November 19)	14	Marcus Cabais	Na Sa'yo Na Ang Lahat	Daniel Padilla	670	Marcus Cabais	Vinci Malizon	Asi Gatdula	Lyle Jangad	Luiz Aguaviva	Macky Tuason	Jeremy Austin
Episode 2 (November 20)	1	Toven Bella	Can You Be My Girl	Bailey May	407	Marcus Cabais	Vinci Malizon	Asi Gatdula	Lyle Jangad	Luiz Aguaviva	Macky Tuason	Jeremy Austin
Episode 2 (November 20)	2	Denrich Ang	Muli		505	Marcus Cabais	Vinci Malizon	Asi Gatdula	Lyle Jangad	Luiz Aguaviva	Macky Tuason	Jeremy Austin
Episode 2 (November 20)	3	Reyster Yton	Oha Kaya Mo Ba To	Enrique Gil	598	Marcus Cabais	Vinci Malizon	Asi Gatdula	Lyle Jangad	Luiz Aguaviva	Macky Tuason	Reyster Yton
Episode 2 (November 20)	4	Gabby Regodon	Pano		584	Marcus Cabais	Vinci Malizon	Asi Gatdula	Lyle Jangad	Luiz Aguaviva	Macky Tuason	Reyster Yton
Episode 2 (November 20)	5	Neil Limbaga	Asan Ka Na Ba		629	Marcus Cabais	Vinci Malizon	Asi Gatdula	Neil Limbaga	Lyle Jangad	Luiz Aguaviva	Macky Tuason
Episode 2 (November 20)	6	Omar Uddin	Cotton Candy		632	Marcus Cabais	Vinci Malizon	Asi Gatdula	Omar Uddin	Neil Limbaga	Lyle Jangad	Luiz Aguaviva
Episode 2 (November 20)	7	Chris Pello	Kumusta Ka		585	Marcus Cabais	Vinci Malizon	Asi Gatdula	Omar Uddin	Neil Limbaga	Lyle Jangad	Luiz Aguaviva
Episode 2 (November 20)	8	Tatin Castillon	Hinahanap ng Puso		637	Marcus Cabais	Vinci Malizon	Tatin Castillon	Asi Gatdula	Omar Uddin	Neil Limbaga	Lyle Jangad
Episode 2 (November 20)	9	Steel Macabanti	Harana		556	Marcus Cabais	Vinci Malizon	Tatin Castillon	Asi Gatdula	Omar Uddin	Neil Limbaga	Lyle Jangad
Episode 2 (November 20)	10	Josh Labing-isa	Nanghihinayang	Jeremiah	633	Marcus Cabais	Vinci Malizon	Tatin Castillon	Asi Gatdula	Josh Labing-isa	Omar Uddin	Neil Limbaga
Episode 2 (November 20)	11	KL Socobos	Halik Sa Hangin		576	Marcus Cabais	Vinci Malizon	Tatin Castillon	Asi Gatdula	Josh Labing-isa	Omar Uddin	Neil Limbaga
Episode 2 (November 20)	12	Miguel Gonzalez	Unli		560	Marcus Cabais	Vinci Malizon	Tatin Castillon	Asi Gatdula	Josh Labing-isa	Omar Uddin	Neil Limbaga
Episode 2 (November 20)	13	Tony Migallon	Kahit Maputi Na Ang Buhok		484	Marcus Cabais	Vinci Malizon	Tatin Castillon	Asi Gatdula	Josh Labing-isa	Omar Uddin	Neil Limbaga
Episode 2 (November 20)	14	Kean Parale	Superhero		588	Marcus Cabais	Vinci Malizon	Tatin Castillon	Asi Gatdula	Josh Labing-isa	Omar Uddin	Neil Limbaga
Episode 2 (November 20)	15	Jeromy Batac	Na Sa'yo Na Ang Lahat	Daniel Padilla	667	Marcus Cabais	Vinci Malizon	Jeromy Batac	Tatin Castillon	Asi Gatdula	Josh Labing-isa	Omar Uddin
Episode 2 (November 20)	16	Kyler Chua	Mabagal	Daniel Padilla & Moira Dela Torre	582	Marcus Cabais	Vinci Malizon	Jeromy Batac	Tatin Castillon	Asi Gatdula	Josh Labing-isa	Omar Uddin
Episode 3 (November 26)	1	Tanner Evans	The Light	BGYO	569	Marcus Cabais	Vinci Malizon	Jeromy Batac	Tatin Castillon	Asi Gatdula	Josh Labing-isa	Omar Uddin
Episode 3 (November 26)	2	Renz Cabading	Muli	Bugoy Drilon	575	Marcus Cabais	Vinci Malizon	Jeromy Batac	Tatin Castillon	Asi Gatdula	Josh Labing-isa	Omar Uddin
Episode 3 (November 26)	3	Redd Arcega	Kahit Maputi na ang Buhok Ko		474	Marcus Cabais	Vinci Malizon	Jeromy Batac	Tatin Castillon	Asi Gatdula	Josh Labing-isa	Omar Uddin
Episode 3 (November 26)	4	Kenzo Bautista	Magandang Dilag		599	Marcus Cabais	Vinci Malizon	Jeromy Batac	Tatin Castillon	Asi Gatdula	Josh Labing-isa	Omar Uddin
Episode 3 (November 26)	5	Drei Amahan	Oha Kaya Mo Ba 'To		658	Marcus Cabais	Vinci Malizon	Jeromy Batac	Drei Amahan	Tatin Castillon	Asi Gatdula	Josh Labing-isa
Episode 3 (November 26)	6	Anjo Sarnate	Gusto Kita		471	Marcus Cabais	Vinci Malizon	Jeromy Batac	Drei Amahan	Tatin Castillon	Asi Gatdula	Josh Labing-isa
Episode 3 (November 26)	7	Josh Worsley	Can You Be My Girl		420	Marcus Cabais	Vinci Malizon	Jeromy Batac	Drei Amahan	Tatin Castillon	Asi Gatdula	Josh Labing-isa
Episode 3 (November 26)	8	Russu Laurente	Hanggang Kailan		486	Marcus Cabais	Vinci Malizon	Jeromy Batac	Drei Amahan	Tatin Castillon	Asi Gatdula	Josh Labing-isa
Episode 3 (November 26)	9	Kim Ng	Gusto Kita	Bailey May	450	Marcus Cabais	Vinci Malizon	Jeromy Batac	Drei Amahan	Tatin Castillon	Asi Gatdula	Josh Labing-isa
Episode 3 (November 26)	10	Jay Lagatao	Hinahanap-Hanap Kita		567	Marcus Cabais	Vinci Malizon	Jeromy Batac	Drei Amahan	Tatin Castillon	Asi Gatdula	Josh Labing-isa
Episode 3 (November 26)	11	Onie De Guzman	Chinito Problems		518	Marcus Cabais	Vinci Malizon	Jeromy Batac	Drei Amahan	Tatin Castillon	Asi Gatdula	Josh Labing-isa
Episode 3 (November 26)	12	Mathew Cruz	Hinahanap ng Puso		452	Marcus Cabais	Vinci Malizon	Jeromy Batac	Drei Amahan	Tatin Castillon	Asi Gatdula	Josh Labing-isa
Episode 3 (November 26)	13	Winston Pineda	Nanghihinayang		498	Marcus Cabais	Vinci Malizon	Jeromy Batac	Drei Amahan	Tatin Castillon	Asi Gatdula	Josh Labing-isa
Episode 3 (November 26)	14	DJ Villaver	Now We're Together		542	Marcus Cabais	Vinci Malizon	Jeromy Batac	Drei Amahan	Tatin Castillon	Asi Gatdula	Josh Labing-isa
Episode 3 (November 26)	15	Prince Encelan	Simpleng Tao	Gloc 9	557	Marcus Cabais	Vinci Malizon	Jeromy Batac	Drei Amahan	Tatin Castillon	Asi Gatdula	Josh Labing-isa
Episode 3 (November 26)	16	Laurence Matias	Bakit Ba Ikaw		558	Marcus Cabais	Vinci Malizon	Jeromy Batac	Drei Amahan	Tatin Castillon	Asi Gatdula	Josh Labing-isa
Episode 3 (November 26)	17	Chie Tan	Pagbigyang Muli		554	Marcus Cabais	Vinci Malizon	Jeromy Batac	Drei Amahan	Tatin Castillon	Asi Gatdula	Josh Labing-isa
Episode 3 (November 26)	18	Julian Osorio			525	Marcus Cabais	Vinci Malizon	Jeromy Batac	Drei Amahan	Tatin Castillon	Asi Gatdula	Josh Labing-isa
Episode 3 (November 26)	19	Ron Castillo			519	Marcus Cabais	Vinci Malizon	Jeromy Batac	Drei Amahan	Tatin Castillon	Asi Gatdula	Josh Labing-isa
Episode 3 (November 26)	20	Justin Uy			507	Marcus Cabais	Vinci Malizon	Jeromy Batac	Drei Amahan	Tatin Castillon	Asi Gatdula	Josh Labing-isa
Episode 3 (November 26)	21	Wilson Budoy	Wiwu		673	Wilson Budoy	Marcus Cabais	Vinci Malizon	Jeromy Batac	Drei Amahan	Tatin Castillon	Asi Gatdula
Episode 4 (November 27)	1											
Episode 4 (November 27)	1											
Episode 4 (November 27)	1											
Episode 4 (November 27)	1											
Episode 4 (November 27)	1											
Episode 4 (November 27)	1											
Episode 4 (November 27)	1											
Episode 4 (November 27)	1											
Episode 4 (November 27)	1											
Episode 4 (November 27)	1											
Episode 4 (November 27)	1											
Episode 4 (November 27)	1											
Episode 4 (November 27)	1											
Episode 4 (November 27)	1											
Episode 4 (November 27)	1											

== Group Battle Performances (Episodes 6-8) ==
Different from the Produce 101 series, the Dream Mentors chose ten trainees whom they think has a leader material. The Dream Mentors chose Wilson Budoy, Vinci Malizon, Jeromy Batac, Drei Amahan, Tatin Castillon, Reyster Yton, KL Socobos, Laurence Matias, Matt Cruz, and Russu Laurente to be the leaders of their respective team. Wilson, as the highest-ranking leader, chooses his team members first, one at a time. The process of choosing was based on their ranking from the 1st Mentors' evaluation.

Each member can receive a maximum of 800 points from the 8 Mentors.

All members of the winning team will receive a benefit of 100 points, which will be added up to their Mentors' Points.

Color key

Winning team
Leader
Center
Leader and center

Performance			Team		Team Votes	Contestant	Original Mentors’ Score	Final Mentors’ Score
#	Song	Artist	#	Name	Team Votes	Name	Original Mentors’ Score	Final Mentors’ Score
1	"All I Have To Give"	Backstreet Boys	1	Rivals	556.4^{23}	Denrich Ang	536	536
1	"All I Have To Give"	Backstreet Boys	1	Rivals	556.4^{23}	JL Macatangay	504^{22}	504^{22}
1	"All I Have To Give"	Backstreet Boys	1	Rivals	556.4^{23}	Marcus Cabais	592	592
1	"All I Have To Give"	Backstreet Boys	1	Rivals	556.4^{23}	Omar Uddin	543	543
1	"All I Have To Give"	Backstreet Boys	1	Rivals	556.4^{23}	Renz Cabading	567	567
1	"All I Have To Give"	Backstreet Boys	1	Rivals	556.4^{23}	Reyster Yton	597	597
1	"All I Have To Give"	Backstreet Boys	2	Deviant	583.6^{23}	Jay-R Albino	561	661
1	"All I Have To Give"	Backstreet Boys	2	Deviant	583.6^{23}	Jeremy Austin	541	641
1	"All I Have To Give"	Backstreet Boys	2	Deviant	583.6^{23}	Jom Aceron	599	699
1	"All I Have To Give"	Backstreet Boys	2	Deviant	583.6^{23}	Kim Ng	523	623
1	"All I Have To Give"	Backstreet Boys	2	Deviant	583.6^{23}	Wilson Budoy	694	794
2	"Da Coconut Nut"	BINI	1	Manawari	3303	Chris Pello	unrevealed ^{15}	
2	"Da Coconut Nut"	BINI	1	Manawari	3303	Jay Lagatao	573	573
2	"Da Coconut Nut"	BINI	1	Manawari	3303	Josh Labing-isa	558	558
2	"Da Coconut Nut"	BINI	1	Manawari	3303	KL Socobos	569	569
2	"Da Coconut Nut"	BINI	1	Manawari	3303	Tanner Evans	546	546
2	"Da Coconut Nut"	BINI	1	Manawari	3303	Wayne Gutierrez	unrevealed ^{15}	
2	"Da Coconut Nut"	BINI	2	Hexnut	3482	Asi Gatdula	580	680
2	"Da Coconut Nut"	BINI	2	Hexnut	3482	DJ Villaver	585	685
2	"Da Coconut Nut"	BINI	2	Hexnut	3482	Ishiro Incapas	545	645
2	"Da Coconut Nut"	BINI	2	Hexnut	3482	Jeromy Batac	638	738
2	"Da Coconut Nut"	BINI	2	Hexnut	3482	Josh Worsley	531	631
2	"Da Coconut Nut"	BINI	2	Hexnut	3482	Thad Sune	603	703
3	"Awitin Mo, Sasayaw Ko"	VST & Company	1	Hexorphic	3357	Asa Wy	524	624
3	"Awitin Mo, Sasayaw Ko"	VST & Company	1	Hexorphic	3357	Joshua Nubla	539	639
3	"Awitin Mo, Sasayaw Ko"	VST & Company	1	Hexorphic	3357	Kean Parale	586	686
3	"Awitin Mo, Sasayaw Ko"	VST & Company	1	Hexorphic	3357	Luiz Aguaviva	569	669
3	"Awitin Mo, Sasayaw Ko"	VST & Company	1	Hexorphic	3357	Russu Laurente	613	713
3	"Awitin Mo, Sasayaw Ko"	VST & Company	1	Hexorphic	3357	Steel Macabanti	526	626
3	"Awitin Mo, Sasayaw Ko"	VST & Company	2	C Vision	3225	Kyler Chua	504	504
3	"Awitin Mo, Sasayaw Ko"	VST & Company	2	C Vision	3225	Macky Tuason	509	509
3	"Awitin Mo, Sasayaw Ko"	VST & Company	2	C Vision	3225	Neil Limbaga	571	571
3	"Awitin Mo, Sasayaw Ko"	VST & Company	2	C Vision	3225	Onie de Guzman	508	508
3	"Awitin Mo, Sasayaw Ko"	VST & Company	2	C Vision	3225	Redd Arcega	486 ^{22}	486 ^{22}
3	"Awitin Mo, Sasayaw Ko"	VST & Company	2	C Vision	3225	Vinci Malizon	647	647
4	"He's Into Her"	BGYO	1	De Ja	3306	Drei Amahan	640	740
4	"He's Into Her"	BGYO	1	De Ja	3306	Gabb Regodon	493	593
4	"He's Into Her"	BGYO	1	De Ja	3306	Karl Villamar	538	638
4	"He's Into Her"	BGYO	1	De Ja	3306	Lyle Jangad	596	696
4	"He's Into Her"	BGYO	1	De Ja	3306	Mathew Cruz	511	611
4	"He's Into Her"	BGYO	1	De Ja	3306	Ron Castillo	528	628
4	"He's Into Her"	BGYO	2	Infinity	3284	Anjo Sarnate	505	505
4	"He's Into Her"	BGYO	2	Infinity	3284	Laurence Matias	589	589
4	"He's Into Her"	BGYO	2	Infinity	3284	Prince Encelan	644	644
4	"He's Into Her"	BGYO	2	Infinity	3284	Tony Migallon	unrevealed ^{15}	
4	"He's Into Her"	BGYO	2	Infinity	3284	Vieo Garcia	unrevealed ^{15}	
4	"He's Into Her"	BGYO	2	Infinity	3284	Winston Pineda	523	523
5	"Tearin’ Up My Heart"	NSYNC	1	TRS	3353	John Regaña	unrevealed ^{15}	
5	"Tearin’ Up My Heart"	NSYNC	1	TRS	3353	JM Ronquillo	572	572
5	"Tearin’ Up My Heart"	NSYNC	1	TRS	3353	Matt Cruz	672	672
5	"Tearin’ Up My Heart"	NSYNC	1	TRS	3353	Miguel Gonzalez	544	544
5	"Tearin’ Up My Heart"	NSYNC	1	TRS	3353	Pan-Pan Rosas	594	594
5	"Tearin’ Up My Heart"	NSYNC	1	TRS	3353	Toven Bella	unrevealed ^{15}	
5	"Tearin’ Up My Heart"	NSYNC	2	W' R-eyes	3483	Chie Tan	632	732
5	"Tearin’ Up My Heart"	NSYNC	2	W' R-eyes	3483	Jules Indiola	578	678
5	"Tearin’ Up My Heart"	NSYNC	2	W' R-eyes	3483	Julius Ledesma	559	659
5	"Tearin’ Up My Heart"	NSYNC	2	W' R-eyes	3483	Kerwin Buenafe	543	643
5	"Tearin’ Up My Heart"	NSYNC	2	W' R-eyes	3483	Lem Malubay	542	642
5	"Tearin’ Up My Heart"	NSYNC	2	W' R-eyes	3483	Tatin Castillon	629 ^{24}	729 ^{24}

== Position Mission (Episodes 13-16) ==
Each Dream Chasers will choose their own position (Vocals, Dance, Rap). Each member can receive a maximum of 700 points from the 7 Mentors.

The one with the highest score from the mentors from each group will receive a benefit of 50 points. Aside from that, the Best Vocals, Best Dancer, and Best Rapper (the highest-scoring Dream Chaser from each position) chosen by the Dream Mentors will receive a benefit of 50 points.

Color key

Winner
Leader
Center
Leader and center

Performance					Name	Ranking					
Position	#	Artist	Song	Team Name	Name	Group	Vocal	Dance	Rap	Original Mentors’ Score	Final Mentors’ Score
Vocal	2	Zack Tabudlo	Habang Buhay	BTB	Joshua Nubla	4	14	-	-	405	405
Vocal	2	Zack Tabudlo	Habang Buhay	BTB	Kerwin Buenafe	2	12	-	-	unrevealed ^{15}	
Vocal	2	Zack Tabudlo	Habang Buhay	BTB	Karl Villamar	3	13	-	-	unrevealed ^{15}	
Vocal	2	Zack Tabudlo	Habang Buhay	BTB	Macky Tuason	5	15	-	-	393	393
Vocal	2	Zack Tabudlo	Habang Buhay	BTB	Pan-Pan Rosas	1	5	-	-	459	509
Vocal	5	Charlie Puth ft. Jungkook	Left and Right	Hypeone	Chie Tan	2	3	-	-	537	537
Vocal	5	Charlie Puth ft. Jungkook	Left and Right	Hypeone	Jay-R Albino	4	8	-	-	473	473
Vocal	5	Charlie Puth ft. Jungkook	Left and Right	Hypeone	JM Ronquillo	3	7	-	-	474	474
Vocal	5	Charlie Puth ft. Jungkook	Left and Right	Hypeone	Onie de Guzman	5	11	-	-	unrevealed ^{15}	
Vocal	5	Charlie Puth ft. Jungkook	Left and Right	Hypeone	Wilson Budoy	1	2	-	-	539	589
Vocal	7	Flip Music All Stars	Tuloy Pa Rin	PDYN	Anjo Sarnate	3	6	-	-	505	505
Vocal	7	Flip Music All Stars	Tuloy Pa Rin	PDYN	Asa Wy	5	10	-	-	unrevealed ^{15}	
Vocal	7	Flip Music All Stars	Tuloy Pa Rin	PDYN	Denrich Ang	2	4	-	-	519	519
Vocal	7	Flip Music All Stars	Tuloy Pa Rin	PDYN	Josh Labing-isa	1	1	-	-	546	646
Vocal	7	Flip Music All Stars	Tuloy Pa Rin	PDYN	Miguel Gonzalez	4	9	-	-	unrevealed ^{15}	
Dance	1	G22	Bang	A-7	DJ Villaver	7	-	15	-	482	482
Dance	1	G22	Bang	A-7	Drei Amahan	1	-	2	-	597	647
Dance	1	G22	Bang	A-7	Jom Aceron	5	-	10	-	507	507
Dance	1	G22	Bang	A-7	Lem Malubay	6	-	14	-	492	492
Dance	1	G22	Bang	A-7	Matt Cruz	2	-	5	-	571	571
Dance	1	G22	Bang	A-7	Reyster Yton	3	-	6	-	553	553
Dance	1	G22	Bang	A-7	Winston Pineda	4	-	9	-	511	511
Dance	4	TFN	Amazon	Ambizion	Ishiro Incapas	6	-	17	-	471	471
Dance	4	TFN	Amazon	Ambizion	Jeromy Batac	1	-	1	-	609	709
Dance	4	TFN	Amazon	Ambizion	KL Socobos	4	-	8	-	520	520
Dance	4	TFN	Amazon	Ambizion	Kyler Chua	5	-	16	-	480	480
Dance	4	TFN	Amazon	Ambizion	Marcus Cabais	3	-	7	-	545	545
Dance	4	TFN	Amazon	Ambizion	Mathew Cruz	7	-	19	-	unrevealed ^{15}	
Dance	4	TFN	Amazon	Ambizion	Vinci Malizon	2	-	3	-	582	582
Dance	8	Astro	Alive	Lifeline	Jeremy Austin	6	-	20	-	unrevealed ^{15}	
Dance	8	Astro	Alive	Lifeline	Josh Worsley	7	-	21	-	409	409
Dance	8	Astro	Alive	Lifeline	Kean Parale	5	-	18	-	unrevealed ^{15}	
Dance	8	Astro	Alive	Lifeline	Kim Ng	2	-	11	-	502	502
Dance	8	Astro	Alive	Lifeline	Lyle Jangad	1	-	4	-	531	581
Dance	8	Astro	Alive	Lifeline	Neil Limbaga	4	-	13	-	495	495
Dance	8	Astro	Alive	Lifeline	Thad Sune	3	-	12	-	498	498
Rap	3	Juan Caoile & Kyleswish	Marikit	4Wrecker	Asi Gatdula	1	-	-	3	466	516
Rap	3	Juan Caoile & Kyleswish	Marikit	4Wrecker	Jay Lagatao	2	-	-	4	unrevealed ^{15}	
Rap	3	Juan Caoile & Kyleswish	Marikit	4Wrecker	Jules Indiola	3	-	-	5	447	447
Rap	3	Juan Caoile & Kyleswish	Marikit	4Wrecker	Luiz Aguaviva	4	-	-	6	440	440
Rap	6	Francis Magalona	Kabataan Para Sa Kinabukasan	Up4t	Julius Ledesma	3	-	-	7	unrevealed ^{15}	
Rap	6	Francis Magalona	Kabataan Para Sa Kinabukasan	Up4t	Prince Encelan	2	-	-	2	527	527
Rap	6	Francis Magalona	Kabataan Para Sa Kinabukasan	Up4t	Ron Castillo	4	-	-	8	392	392
Rap	6	Francis Magalona	Kabataan Para Sa Kinabukasan	Up4t	Russu Laurente	1	-	-	1	543	643

== New K-pop Song Launch Mission (Episodes 19-20) ==
For this mission, there will be four original songs, all of which composed by Dream Mentor BULL$EYE. There will be two winning teams for this mission, and each of them will perform their song in one or two Kapamilya shows (It's Showtime and Magandang Buhay).

Aside from that, the Dream Chaser who got the most votes from the voting booth in the last mall show in Robinsons Las Piñas will get an additional benefit of 30 points to be used in the third elimination. On the mall show (televised on Episode 22), it was announced that Ishiro Incapas will receive the benefit after garnering 23.22% of the votes.

Color key

Team who got the highest average group votes
Team who got the second-highest average group votes
Leader
Center
Leader and center

Performance				Name	Mentor's Score
#	Song	Team Name	Team Score (Average of Individual Scores)	Name	Mentor's Score
1	Odd Eye	Eye Risk	394.9	Denrich Ang	415
1	Odd Eye	Eye Risk	394.9	Jay-R Albino	435
1	Odd Eye	Eye Risk	394.9	Joshua Nubla	245
1	Odd Eye	Eye Risk	394.9	Macky Tuason	411
1	Odd Eye	Eye Risk	394.9	Ron Castillo	247
1	Odd Eye	Eye Risk	394.9	Thad Sune	499
1	Odd Eye	Eye Risk	394.9	Vinci Malizon	512
2	Hit Me	Topick	413.3	Asi Gatdula	366
2	Hit Me	Topick	413.3	Drei Amahan	450
2	Hit Me	Topick	413.3	Ishiro Incapas	224
2	Hit Me	Topick	413.3	Jeromy Batac	501
2	Hit Me	Topick	413.3	Jom Aceron	385
2	Hit Me	Topick	413.3	Reyster Yton	487
2	Hit Me	Topick	413.3	Russu Laurente	413
2	Hit Me	Topick	413.3	Wilson Budoy	480
3	Lovey Dovey	6 of Hearts	354.3	Anjo Sarnate	195
3	Lovey Dovey	6 of Hearts	354.3	Josh Labing-isa	364
3	Lovey Dovey	6 of Hearts	354.3	Josh Worsley	332
3	Lovey Dovey	6 of Hearts	354.3	Luiz Aguaviva	404
3	Lovey Dovey	6 of Hearts	354.3	Marcus Cabais	489
3	Lovey Dovey	6 of Hearts	354.3	Pan-pan Rosas	342
4	Tiger	Hunters	403.6	Jules Ledesma	261
4	Tiger	Hunters	403.6	Kim Ng	412
4	Tiger	Hunters	403.6	Kyler Chua	506
4	Tiger	Hunters	403.6	Matt Cruz	474
4	Tiger	Hunters	403.6	Neil Limbaga	298
4	Tiger	Hunters	403.6	Prince Encelan	469
4	Tiger	Hunters	403.6	Winston Pineda	405

== Final Mission (Episodes 25-26) ==
In the final mission, there will be two songs to be performed: Dash, composed by Dream Mentor BULL$EYE, and Deja Vu, composed by Dream Mentor Seo Won-jin. Dream Chasers are given the chance to pick the song they want to perform. The order of choosing is based on the 3rd elimination ranking. After picking, the groups need to be balanced at 8 members each, and the group with the most members will need to vote secretly via the voting booth and the most voted Dream Chaser(s) will need to pick from another team.

In another twist, the order of the performance is determined by picking a paper in the bowl. Whoever gets the red paper will decide who will perform first. Matt Cruz gets the red paper, and his group decided to perform last.

Color key

Leader
Center
Leader and center

Performance			Name
#	Song	Team Name	Name
1	Deja Vu		Drei Amahan
1	Deja Vu		Jom Aceron
1	Deja Vu		Josh Labing-isa
1	Deja Vu		Macky Tuason
1	Deja Vu		Marcus Cabais
1	Deja Vu		Reyster Yton
1	Deja Vu		Thad Sune
1	Deja Vu		Vinci Malizon
2	Dash		Jay-R Albino
2	Dash		Jeromy Batac
2	Dash		Kim Ng
2	Dash		Kyler Chua
2	Dash		Matt Cruz ^{26}
2	Dash		Prince Encelan ^{26}
2	Dash		Wilson Budoy
2	Dash		Winston Pineda

== Notes ==
1. *Anjo Sarnate joined in first season of Tawag ng Tanghalan, but he lost. He returned in the second quarter of the fifth season, but was eliminated in the face-off round to Aeron Santos. He also joined in third season of I Can See Your Voice as one of the mystery singers.
2. Asi Gatdula was a contestant on the first season of The Voice Teens as a member of Kamp Kawayan. He lost the battle, but was stolen by Sharon Cuneta. He was later eliminated in the knockouts to Jeremy Glinoga.
3. Chie Tan is a supporter of former Philippine President Rodrigo Duterte, who admitted to using his presidential powers in the shutdown of ABS-CBN and denial of franchise renewal. He also recently competed in Sing Galing!
4. Denrich Ang joined Tawag ng Tanghalan on It's Showtime. He also joined the second season of The Clash and was eliminated in the One-on-One round.
5. Drei Amahan used to be one of the back-up dancers of Dream Mentor Darren Espanto, as well as other P-pop artists BINI, BGYO, and AC Bonifacio. He also joined World of Dance Philippines, Your Moment, and Popinoy.
6. Jay Lagatao competed in the show Your Moment as part of the group Acous3x and was eliminated in the first round.
7. Josh Labing-isa was a contestant on the second season of The Voice Teens as a member of FamiLea. He was eliminated in the knockouts to Cydel Gabutero, who ended up as one of the grand winners of the season. He also joined the fifth season of Tawag ng Tanghalan and was eliminated in the Quarterfinals to Reiven Umali, who ended up as the winner of the season.
8. Josh Worsley was one of the first batch of teen housemates in Pinoy Big Brother: Otso. He was the first housemate evicted on Day 9.
9. Joshua Nubla was a contestant of the second season of The Voice Teens as a member of Team apl. He was eliminated in the battle rounds to Tyson Venegas.
10. Kenzo Bautista, Kim Ng, Matt Cruz, Tanner Evans, and Tatin Castillon joined Top Class. Tanner was eliminated on Episode 4; Kim and Matt were eliminated on Episode 6; Kenzo and Tatin were eliminated on Episode 8. Tatin Castillon also joined Tawag ng Tanghalan on It's Showtime.
11. Marcus Cabais, Omar Uddin, and Prince Encelan were previously former hosts of the children's television show Team Yey!. Marcus was on the third season, Omar was on the fourth and fifth season, and Prince was on the fifth season. Marcus also joined It's Showtime segment Mini Me and also appeared in the 2018 film My 2 Mommies. Prince also joined the fourth season of The Voice Kids and was eliminated in the blind auditions.
12. Miguel Gonzales was a contestant on Pinoy Boyband Superstar under the screen name Cyrill Tumamak and was eliminated in the Middle Rounds' Last Chance Performance Night. He also joined in the first quarter of the fifth season, but was lost to Mark Anthony Mendoza.
13. Russu Laurente was a controversial housemate in Pinoy Big Brother: Connect. He was the second housemate to be evicted on Day 29.
14. Wilson Budoy was a contestant on the fourth season of The Voice Kids Germany as a member of Mark Forster's team and was eliminated in the battle rounds.
15. Some of the Dream Chasers' points were not revealed in the show.
16. Although Chie and Lem got more public votes than Prince, the broadcast public points of the two Dream Chasers are 340, 350, and 360 points, respectively.
17. Although Winston got more public votes than Jay and Drei, the broadcast public points of these Dream Chasers are 690, 710, and 700 points, respectively.
18. Although Reyster got more public votes than Ishiro, the broadcast public points of the two Dream Chasers are 760 and 770 points, respectively. However, it didn't affect the Dream Chasers' ranking.
19. Although Jules got more public votes than Josh Labing-isa, the broadcast public points of the two Dream Chasers are 550 and 560 points, respectively. However, it didn't affect the Dream Chasers' ranking.
20. Although Wilson got more public votes than Joshua, the broadcast public points of these Dream Chasers are 610 and 620 points, respectively.
21. Although Kean got more public votes than Pan-pan and Kerwin, the broadcast public points of these Dream Chasers are 480, 500, and 490 points, respectively.
22. JL and Redd's points were not revealed during the show, but their mentors' points are derived by subtracting their respective team score and the scores of their teammates.
23. Because of the different number of members in each group, the winning team is based on the average of the score received by the members from the Dream Mentors.
24. Although Tatin left before the 1st elimination and his score wasn't broadcast, his score is derived by subtracting his team score from his members’ individual scores.
25. Ishiro was given additional 30 points after receiving the most votes in the voting booth which happened in Robinsons Las Piñas mall show.
26. Matt and Prince originally chose Deja Vu, but was voted out by their fellow members to go to Dash.
