= Ken San Jose =

Filipino dancer (born 2002)

- Born: Kenneth Paul San Jose; April 10, 2002 (age 24); Los Angeles, California, United States
- Occupation: Dancer
- Years active: 2014–present
- Agents: ABS-CBN (2019-2020); Cornerstone Entertainment (2019-present); Brightlight Productions (2020-present)
- Known for: World of Dance Philippines
- Height: 5 ft 7 in (170 cm)

Kenneth Paul San Jose (born April 10, 2002) is an American dancer. He finished 3rd place in the final round of World of Dance Philippines.

== Career ==
San Jose was born on April 10, 2002, in Los Angeles. In 2014, he decided to dance instead of singing and started to train in formal hip-hop. He currently learns dancing from various studios, including Movement Lifestyle and Millennium Dance Complex. He changed some dance instructors in order to learn some more moves.

He appears on several TV ads and videos for Kidz Bop 27 & 29 TruTv’s Fake Off, 2015 ABC Mouse, 2015 Radio Disney Music Awards and MTV Mexico.

In 2018, he joined World of Dance Philippines to become a more popular dancer. He entered the Juniors Division and made it to the finals.

In April 2019, he released the singles "Lose Control." In 2020, he released "A Chance To Hold."

Later in 2020, he released a Taglish single called Halma.

== Personal life ==
San Jose's father, Cres San Jose, an Ilonggo from Bacolod, was a member of a dance group called Back on Track. Diagnosed with stage 4 lung cancer in 2017, he died In 2018. San Jose's brother Matthew was a singer. San Jose is a great grandson of Davao's Carmen D. Locsin, founder of Locsin Dance Workshop. His mother Claudine San Jose was the daughter of Bing Locsin, who is the daughter of the founder of the said institution, the oldest known in the Philippines.

San Jose is cousin with Luke Penalosa and a close friend of AC Bonifacio and Bailey Sok.
