= DMTN =

South Korean boy band

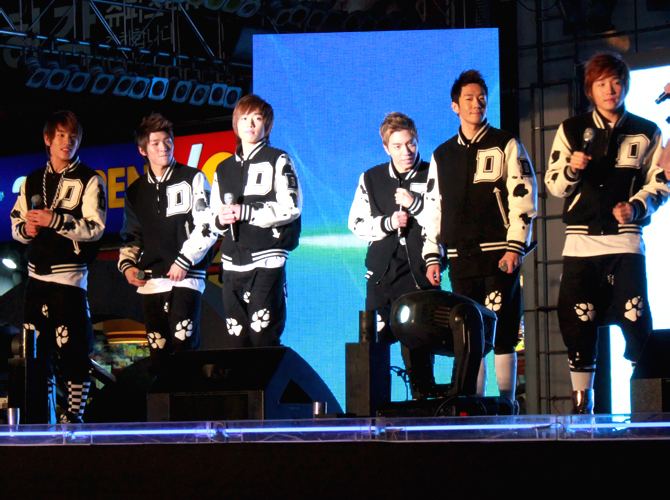
- DMTN in 2010; From left to right: Inati, Daniel, Donglim, Day Day, Dari, and Jeesu

Background information
- Also known as: Dalmatian
- Origin: Seoul, South Korea
- Genres: K-pop; hip hop; dance
- Years active: 2009–2013; 2020
- Labels: Monkey Funch; IS Entermedia; 2Works
- Past members: Inati; Day Day; Dari; Donglim; Jeesu; Daniel; Simon
- Website: dmtn.co.kr

DMTN (Korean: 디엠티엔; an initialism for Desire.Motivation.Timing.Now), formerly Dalmatian (달마시안), was a South Korean boy band created and managed by MC Mong under Monkey Funch Entertainment. The original lineup consisted of Inati, Day Day, Donglim, Jeesu, Dari, and Daniel. Dalmatian released a 30-second music video teaser of their debut digital single "Round 1" on August 25, 2010. It was followed by the song and video's full release on September 1, 2010 and the group made their debut performance the following day on Mnet's music program M! Countdown.

On May 7, 2012, Dalmatian announced that Day Day left from the group for personal reasons, and member Simon later joined the group. Dari enlisted in the military immediately after promotion for "That Man Opposed" ended in 2011, which resulted in his hiatus from the group. Dalmatian compromised Inati, Jeesu, Daniel, Donglim, and Simon. The group then changed its name to DMTN, following its move to a new label. The group went on hiatus in 2013 following Daniel's marijuana scandal.

== History ==
=== 2005–2010: Formation and debut ===
In 1999, Inati was a member of hip-hop group People Crew. He suffered a rare intracerebral hemorrhage in April 2004 and fell into a coma. His groupmate MC Mong pleaded with Inati and promised to make an album for him if he regained consciousness; he remained comatose for two months before awaking. MC Mong conceived Dalmatian in late spring of 2005. Day Day and Dari joined the group that same year; Daniel was added later. With the inclusion of a final member, MC Mong formally announced a five-member unit in December 2009 with the intention of debuting them in February of the following year. A portmanteau of "dalmatian" and "musician", the name was chosen to signify the "fashionable and distinctive" group's unwavering loyalty to their fans. They made a guest appearance at MC Mong's year-end concert Variety Spirit in the third and final performance of the series at the Olympic Gymnastics Arena in Seoul on December 31, 2009. In March 2010, he established the music agency Monkey Funch, serving as the company's CEO and record producer. Prior to the group's debut, a member withdrew from the lineup to enlist in mandatory military service. He was replaced by Donglim in July and Jeesu was added as the sixth member. In August, management company MacroShore filed an injunction with the Seoul Central District Court against Monkey Funch to prohibit the distribution of Dalmatian's music and videos, claiming that the agency ignored Donglim's exclusive contract with the firm upon adding him to the group in violation of the agreement. The court rejected the complaint a month later.

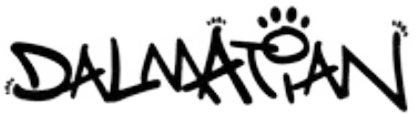
Dalmatian logo

Formed as a sextet consisting of Inati, Day Day, Dari, Jeesu, Daniel, and Youngwon (Donglim), (Note: Jeesu's name was initially romanized as "Jisu", while Daniel had debuted with the stage name Drama. These changes were reflected from 2011.) they signed with IS Entermedia Group; the members were trainees for an average of five years. A music video teaser for Dalmatian's forthcoming debut was released on August 25, 2010. A Monkey Funch representative stated, "The footprints left by the male in the teaser represent Dalmatian's footprints. It means that Dalmatian will enter the music world and leave their mark." Written by MC Mong and Jo Yeong-su, Dalmatian released their debut single "Round 1" on September 1. The group was gifted a dalmatian dog named Ppanggu (빵구), which became their mascot and was included in the song's music video. They made their first music show performance on Mnet's M Countdown the following day. The group also starred in their variety show Dalmatian's Manager Goes on Strike on Mnet from September 7 to November 9. Shortly after the show's premiere, MC Mong was indicted for allegedly evading his mandatory military service; it negatively impacted celebrities in his circle including Dalmatian and television series where he served as a cast member. Dalmatian carried out group promotions for two weeks before discreetly halting activities. On November 29, Daniel and Beast's Yoseob released the collaboration single "First Snow, First Kiss". In the final two months of the year, Dalmatian were guest performers at SG Wannabe's It's SG Wannabe national concert tour.

=== 2011–2012: Dalmatian and State of Emergency ===
On February 14, 2011, Dalmatian released their debut self-titled mini-album with the two lead singles "Lover Cop" and "That Man Opposed". Comparing the songs to a dalmatian, the group felt that former demonstrated a "black feeling" about unrequited love, while the latter's comical lyrics and "gentle and cute" appearance illustrated a "white feeling". According to music distributor Mnet Media, men accounted for approximately 70% of listeners of "That Man Opposed", largely in their 10s through 40s. The company contrasted their findings from other male idol groups, noting that women were generally the "driving force" behind their popularity. Dalmatian released a remix of the track on April 4, which they promoted henceforth. Immediately after promotions ended, member Dari enlisted into the army on April 25, 2011. The group attempted to release a followup record, but was faced with various delays by the circumstances surrounding their company.

Day Day left the group citing "personal reasons" and Simon was added to the lineup, and the quintet began working on new music. They prioritized their "image transformation" and maturity, opting for a more masculine impression. Released on March 2, 2012, Dalmatian provided an acoustic rendition of "The Romantic" for the original soundtrack of TVN's television series of the same name. The group released their second mini-album State of Emergency and its lead single "E.R" on May 16. The song was produced by music duo Duble Sidekick, who oversaw production on all the tracks on the album along with the group. Dalmatian hosted the entertainment program Idol TV Dalmatian on SonbadakTV the following month. Upon the expiration of the group's contract with IS Entermedia, they left the company and signed with 2Works Entertainment.

=== 2013: Name change, drug scandal, and dissolution ===
In 2013, Dalmatian changed their group name to DMTN (Desire. Motivation. Timing. Now), also derived as an abbreviation for their former group name. Their agency explained the decision of name change, commenting, "It is unheard of for a group who is promoting to change their name. However, it was a decision that was made after much thought to give off a different and more mature image than the original Dalmatian." Daniel is said to have come up with the words that DMTN stands for himself. Following the news of the group name change, Youngwon announced that he would no longer be using his stage name and opted for his birth name Donglim. DMTN released the song "Safety Zone" on January 29, 2013. Following the release of the single, DMTN began regular promotions on Mnet's M Countdown on January 31, 2013.

On March 8, an arrest warrant was filed against member Daniel by the Seoul Metropolitan Police Agency. Daniel was under suspicion of selling and using marijuana. No marijuana was found in his body when the police ran tests. However, after further hair tests were conducted, he tested positive. On the same day, Daniel admitted to aiding in the distribution of marijuana; however he and his agency both confirmed that Daniel did not physically use or sell marijuana. However, he "acted as the intermediary in the selling of marijuana 12 times and sold marijuana 4 times and was sentenced to 1 year in jail and fined 7,160,000 KRW. Later on, Judge Kim Joo-hyun of the Seoul High Court changed Daniel's one year jail sentence to three years probation. He said during the trial, "Because Daniel's sister has promised to supervise the defendant and Daniel cooperated with the investigation, I have judged in his favor." In addition to his probation, Daniel was required to complete 120 hours of community service and 80 hours of substance abuse rehab. Daniel was charged with using, distributing, and selling marijuana, along with other celebrities, back in March 2013. He admitted to all charges and received a one-year jail sentence in October. He made an appeal and began his seven trial appeal in December. During his appeal, Daniel had asked for forgiveness saying that, "If you show me mercy, I will become a young man that is an asset to this country. Please forgive me." His sister also promised to move to the United States to watch over him as he attends an American university. Daniel received a reduced sentence. Following his marijuana scandal, Daniel stepped down from his MC position on Arirang TV's Pops in Seoul.

2Works Entertainment put the group on a hiatus in 2013. The company commented that, "For the time being, it's hard to make any decisions until Daniel's trial is over. The members currently carrying out activities will continue with them." Furthermore, the company denied rumors of Daniel leaving the group, or the group continuing on without him by clarifying that "we have never thought about group activities without Danny." It ultimately culminated in the de facto disbandment of DMTN. Prior to its demise, the group was scheduled to initiate overseas promotions in April and tentatively release an album in May.

=== 2020: 10th anniversary single ===
Orchestrated by Daniel, DMTN reunited and recorded a song for the group's 10-year anniversary. With Jeesu serving mandatory military service, he was unable to take part on the track. An R&B ballad, "Never Forget" was released on June 19, 2020, their first single in seven years.

== Musical style ==
Dalmatian was formed as a hip hop and dance group. Making a "clear" distinction between the rappers and vocalists, the group seeks to showcase their "fierce and manly" side and a "tender charm" through sentimental music. They cited g.o.d as their aspiration. Writing for newspaper Segye Ilbo, Han Jun-ho took note of the retro melodies in Dalmatian's debut single while commending the members' "exceptional" skills in rapping and dancing. Their debut mini-album showcased a range of hip hop tracks and sentimental ballads.

== Former members ==
- Inati (이나티) – leader, rap
- Day Day (데이데이) – rap
- Dari (다리) – rap
- Donglim (동림) – vocals
- Jeesu (지수) – main vocals
- Daniel (다니엘) – lead vocals
- Simon (사이먼) – rap, vocals

== Discography ==
=== Albums ===
==== Mini-albums ====
Title	Album details	Peak chart positions	Sales
Title	Album details	KOR	Sales
Dalmatian	Released: February 14, 2011; Label: IS Entermedia; Format: CD, digital download	22	KOR: 5,755+
State of Emergency	Released: May 16, 2012; Label: IS Entermedia; Format: CD, digital download	9	KOR: 5,653+

=== Singles ===
Title	Year	Peak chart positions	Sales	Album
Title	Year	KOR (Note: Additional week references for Gaon Digital Chart: "Round 1", "That Man Opposed (Remix)", "Safety Zone".)	Sales	Album
"Round 1"	2010	107		Dalmatian
"That Man Opposed" (그 남자는 반대; Geu Namjaneun Bandae)	2011	66	KOR: 546,089+ (Note: Accumulation of sales: 376,453, 122,020, 47,616.)	Dalmatian
"Lover Cop"	2011	—	KOR: 362,462+	Dalmatian
"That Man Opposed (Remix)" (그 남자는 반대 (Remix); Geu Namjaneun Bandae (Remix))	2011	136	KOR: 32,934+	Non-album single
"E.R"	2012	59	KOR: 154,939+ (Note: Accumulation of sales: 121,193, 33,746.)	State of Emergency
"Safety Zone"	2013	131	KOR: 21,791+	Non-album single
"Never Forget"	2020	—		Non-album single

=== Soundtrack appearances ===
Title	Year	Release	Ref.
"The Romantic (Acoustic Ver.)"	2012	The Romantic OST Part.3	

== Filmography ==
Television series
Title	Year	Network	Notes	Ref.
Dalmatian's Manager Goes on Strike	2010	Mnet	10 episodes	
Idol TV Dalmatian	2012	SonbadakTV		
