= State of Emergency (Dalmatian EP) =

EP by Dalmatian
- Released: May 16, 2012
- Length: 18:28
- Language: Korean
- Label: IS Entermedia Group
- Producer: Duble Sidekick, Dalmatian

Dalmatian chronology
Dalmatian (2011)	State of Emergency (2012)

Singles from State of Emergency
- 1. "E.R" Released: May 16, 2012

State of Emergency is the second mini-album by South Korean idol group Dalmatian. It was released on May 16, 2012, through IS Entermedia Group and distributed by Stone Music Entertainment. After the release of its self-titled debut mini-album, the group experienced a lineup change and several album delays.

Following an absence of one year and three months, State of Emergency and its lead single "E.R" were concurrently released. Dalmatian promoted the record through music chart programs across various television networks by performing the song. The mini-album peaked at number nine on South Korea's national Gaon Album Chart, selling over 5,600 copies since its release.

== Background ==
Shortly after completing promotions for Dalmatian's self-titled mini-album, Da-ri enlisted in compulsory military service on April 25, 2011. Day Day also withdrew from the group citing "personal reasons". A followup release was postponed various times by the group's record company. By early December, Simon was added to group.

Dalmatian wanted to disassociate itself from the "puppy-like" perception its name conveyed and decided to remove symbolism portraying dalmatian dogs and their spots from its concept." In contrast from its "cute" concept in its previous single "That Man Opposed", "E.R" showcases a "sexy and masculine" appearance. Noting the dog's fast-growing nature and hunting instincts, the group stated, "In that sense, we think we're on the right track."

== Artwork concept ==
The cover art and album photos for State of Emergency showcase Dalmatian wearing clothes, shoes, and accessories from luxury brands Givenchy, Balmain, and Chrome Hearts. The members also donned faux tattoos on their torsos. They were hand-painted by tattoo artists JP-prodigy and ShyYoung, and the process took 12 hours to complete. The designs, which include a tiger and heart, symbolize each members character. The production cost totaled ₩200,000,000 ($174832.82).

== Music structure ==
State of Emergency was produced by Duble Sidekick and Dalmatian. A dance number with an "acoustic feel", the opening track "E.R" begins with a piano and sirens which "emphasize the emergency" of the narrator's pain upon separating from his lover. Jee-su described the single as "addictive" with a "strong melody".

== Release and promotion ==
The music video teaser for the lead single "E.R" was unveiled on May 11, 2012. State of Emergency was originally scheduled to be issued on May 15, but was delayed by one day as a result of problems that arose with its mastering. Directed by Hong Won-ki, the music video for "E.R" was concurrently released on May 16. It marked a year and three months since the group's previous mini-album.

Dalmatian began promoting "E.R" the day after the mini-album's release on Mnet's music chart show M Countdown, followed by subsequent comeback performances on SBS TV's Inkigayo, MBC TV's Show! Music Core, and KBS2's Music Bank. On June 20, Dalmatian prepared snacks and autographed albums, which they gave to the students of Suncheon Girls' High School in Suncheon, South Jeolla Province, upon visiting the institution. The group also held a guerilla concert at Deoksan High School in Bucheon, Gyeonggi Province. On the July 19, Dalmatian was given a "special stage" on M Countdown, where they performed "Drive" and a dance remix of "E.R".

== Commercial performance ==
On the chart dated May 13–19, 2011, State of Emergency debuted at number nine on South Korea's national Gaon Album Chart. By the end of the month, it shifted 4,103 units in the country. According to Gaon Music Chart's year-end report, the mini-album sold 5,653 copies domestically and ranked at number 211 on its list of best-selling albums.

== Track listing ==
Track listing
No.	Title	Lyrics	Music	Arrangement	Length
1.	"E.R"	Duble Sidekick	Duble Sidekick	Duble Sidekick	3:42
2.	"Drive" (차 안에서; Cha Aneoseo)	Outsidaz, DMTN	Duble Sidekick, Outsidaz	Duble Sidekick	3:47
3.	"Hurt Me"	DMTN	Duble Sidekick, Ichiro Suezawa	Duble Sidekick	3:54
4.	"Still by Ur Side"	Jee-su, Daniel, Inati	Jee-su, Daniel	Ichiro Suezawa	3:24
5.	"E.R" (Inst.)		Duble Sidekick	Duble Sidekick	3:41
Total length:					18:28

== Charts ==
Weekly
Chart (2012)	Peak position
Gaon Album Chart	9

Year-end
Chart (2012)	Peak position
Gaon Album Chart	211
